= 2023 in women's road cycling =

2023 in women's road cycling is about the 2023 women's bicycle races ruled by the UCI and the 2023 UCI Women's Teams.

== World Championships ==
Race	Date	Cat. †	Winner	Second	Third	Ref
(United Kingdom) UCI Road World Championships ITT	10 August 2023	WC	Chloé Dygert (USA)	Grace Brown (AUS)	Christina Schweinberger (AUT)	
(United Kingdom) UCI Road World Championships U23 ITT	10 August 2023	WC	Antonia Niedermaier (GER)	Cédrine Kerbaol (FRA)	Julie De Wilde (BEL)	
(United Kingdom) UCI Road World Championships ITT Junior	10 August 2023	WC	Felicity Wilson-Haffenden (AUS)	Isabel Sharp (GBR)	Federica Venturelli (ITA)	
(United Kingdom) UCI Road World Championships RR	13 August 2023	WC	Lotte Kopecky (BEL)	Demi Vollering (NED)	Cecilie Uttrup Ludwig (DEN)	
(United Kingdom) UCI Road World Championships RR Junior	5 August 2023	WC	Julie Bego (FRA)	Cat Ferguson (GBR)	Fleur Moors (BEL)	
(United Kingdom) UCI Road World Championships TTT	8 August 2023	WC	Switzerland (SUI); Stefan Bissegger; Stefan Küng; Mauro Schmid; Elise Chabbey; Nicole Koller; Marlen Reusser	France (FRA); Bruno Armirail; Rémi Cavagna; Bryan Coquard; Audrey Cordon-Ragot; Cédrine Kerbaol; Juliette Labous	Germany (GER); Miguel Heidemann; Jannik Steimle; Max Walscheid; Ricarda Bauernfeind; Lisa Klein; Franziska Koch	

== UCI Women's WorldTour ==
Race	Date	Cat. †	Winner	Second	Third	Ref
(Australia) Women's Tour Down Under	15–17 January 2023	2.WWT	Grace Brown (AUS)	Amanda Spratt (AUS)	Georgia Williams (NZL)	
(Australia) Cadel Evans Great Ocean Road Race	28 January 2023	1.WWT	Loes Adegeest (NED)	Amanda Spratt (AUS)	Nina Buijsman (NED)	
(United Arab Emirates) UAE Tour	9–12 February 2023	2.WWT	Elisa Longo Borghini (ITA)	Gaia Realini (ITA)	Silvia Persico (ITA)	
(Belgium) Omloop Het Nieuwsblad	25 February 2023	1.WWT	Lotte Kopecky (BEL)	Lorena Wiebes (NED)	Marta Bastianelli (ITA)	
(Italy) Strade Bianche Donne	4 March 2023	1.WWT	Demi Vollering (NED)	Lotte Kopecky (BEL)	Cecilie Uttrup Ludwig (DEN)	
(Netherlands) Ronde van Drenthe	11 March 2023	1.WWT	Lorena Wiebes (NED)	Susanne Andersen (NOR)	Maike van der Duin (NED)	
(Belgium) Classic Brugge–De Panne	23 March 2023	1.WWT	Pfeiffer Georgi (GBR)	Elisa Balsamo (ITA)	Lorena Wiebes (NED)	
(Belgium) Gent–Wevelgem	26 March 2023	1.WWT	Marlen Reusser (SUI)	Megan Jastrab (USA)	Maike van der Duin (NED)	
(Belgium) Tour of Flanders for Women	4 April 2023	1.WWT	Lotte Kopecky (BEL)	Demi Vollering (NED)	Elisa Longo Borghini (ITA)	
(France) Paris–Roubaix Femmes	8 April 2023	1.WWT	Alison Jackson (CAN)	Katia Ragusa (ITA)	Marthe Truyen (BEL)	
(Netherlands) Amstel Gold Race	16 April 2023	1.WWT	Demi Vollering (NED)	Lotte Kopecky (BEL)	Shirin van Anrooij (NED)	
(Belgium) La Flèche Wallonne Féminine	19 April 2023	1.WWT	Demi Vollering (NED)	Liane Lippert (GER)	Gaia Realini (ITA)	
(Belgium) Liège–Bastogne–Liège Femmes	23 April 2023	1.WWT	Demi Vollering (NED)	Elisa Longo Borghini (ITA)	Marlen Reusser (SUI)	
(Spain) La Vuelta Femenina	1–7 May 2023	2.WWT	Annemiek van Vleuten (NED)	Demi Vollering (NED)	Gaia Realini (ITA)	
(Spain) Itzulia Women	12–14 May 2023	2.WWT	Marlen Reusser (SUI)	Demi Vollering (NED)	Katarzyna Niewiadoma (POL)	
(Spain) Vuelta a Burgos Feminas	18–21 May 2023	2.WWT	Demi Vollering (NED)	Shirin van Anrooij (NED)	Ashleigh Moolman (RSA)	
(United Kingdom) RideLondon Classique	26–28 May 2023	2.WWT	Charlotte Kool (NED)	Chloé Dygert (USA)	Lizzie Deignan (GBR)	
(Switzerland) Tour de Suisse Women	17–20 June 2023	2.WWT	Marlen Reusser (SUI)	Demi Vollering (NED)	Elisa Longo Borghini (ITA)	
(Italy) Giro Donne	30 June – 9 July 2023	2.WWT	Annemiek van Vleuten (NED)	Juliette Labous (FRA)	Gaia Realini (ITA)	
Tour de France Femmes	23–30 July 2023	2.WWT	Demi Vollering (NED)	Lotte Kopecky (BEL)	Katarzyna Niewiadoma (POL)	
(Norway) Tour of Scandinavia	23–27 August 2023	2.WWT	Annemiek van Vleuten (NED)	Cecilie Uttrup Ludwig (DEN)	Amber Kraak (NED)	
(France) Classic Lorient Agglomération	2 September 2023	1.WWT	Mischa Bredewold (NED)	Marta Lach (POL)	Sofia Bertizzolo (ITA)	
(Netherlands) Holland Ladies Tour	5–10 September 2023	2.WWT	Lotte Kopecky (BEL)	Lorena Wiebes (NED)	Anna Henderson (GBR)	
(Switzerland) Tour de Romandie Féminin	15–17 September 2023	2.WWT	Demi Vollering (NED)	Katarzyna Niewiadoma (POL)	Marlen Reusser (SUI)	
(China) Tour of Chongming Island	12–14 October 2023	2.WWT	Chiara Consonni (ITA)	Daria Pikulik (POL)	Mylène de Zoete (NED)	
(China) Tour of Guangxi	17 October 2023	1.WWT	Daria Pikulik (POL)	Chiara Consonni (ITA)	Mia Griffin (IRL)	

== UCI Women's ProSeries ==
Race	Date	Cat. †	Winner	Second	Third	Ref
(Spain) Setmana Valenciana-Volta Comunitat Valenciana Fémines	16–19 February 2023	2.Pro	Justine Ghekiere (BEL)	Ashleigh Moolman (RSA)	Amanda Spratt (AUS)	
(Belgium) Nokere Koerse voor Dames	15 March 2023	1.Pro	Lotte Kopecky (BEL)	Lorena Wiebes (NED)	Marta Bastianelli (ITA)	
(Belgium) Dwars door Vlaanderen for Women	29 March 2023	1.Pro	Demi Vollering (NED)	Chiara Consonni (ITA)	Marianne Vos (NED)	
(Belgium) Brabantse Pijl	12 April 2023	1.Pro	Silvia Persico (ITA)	Demi Vollering (NED)	Liane Lippert (GER)	
(Luxembourg) Grand Prix Elsy Jacobs	29–30 April 2023	2.Pro	Ally Wollaston (NZL)	Marta Bastianelli (ITA)	Anouska Koster (NED)	
(Spain) Navarra Women's Elite Classics	10 May 2023	1.Pro	Riejanne Markus (NED)	Tamara Dronova (RUS)	Ella Wyllie (NZL)	
(Germany) Thüringen Ladies Tour	23–28 May 2023	2.Pro	Lotte Kopecky (BEL)	Lorena Wiebes (NED)	Mischa Bredewold (NED)	
(Italy) Giro dell'Emilia Internazionale Donne Elite	30 September 2023	1.Pro	Cecilie Uttrup Ludwig (DEN)	Marta Cavalli (ITA)	Juliette Labous (FRA)	

== Single day races (1.1 and 1.2) ==
Race	Date	Cat. †	Winner	Second	Third	Ref
(Dominican Republic) Road Elite Caribbean Championships ITT	22 October 2022	1.2	Teniel Campbell (TTO)	Caitlin Conyers (BER)	Claudia Baró (CUB)	
(Dominican Republic) Road Elite Caribbean Championships RR	23 October 2022	1.2	Claudia Baró (CUB)	Kélyane Julus (MTQ)	Caitlin Conyers (BER)	
(United Arab Emirates) Arab Road Cycling Championships RR	22 December 2022	1.2	Ebtissam Mohamed (EGY)	Safia Al-Sayegh (UAE)	Latifah Ahmed (KUW)	
(Spain) Women Cycling Pro Costa De Almería	29 January 2023	1.1	Arianna Fidanza (ITA)	Emma Norsgaard (DEN)	Audrey Cordon-Ragot (FRA)	
(Cyprus) Aphrodite Cycling Race ITT	4 February 2023	1.2	Antri Christoforou (CYP)	Olga Zabelinskaya (UZB)	Barbara Malcotti (ITA)	
(Spain) Vuelta CV Feminas	5 February 2023	1.1	Floortje Mackaij (NED)	Liane Lippert (NED)	Nikola Nosková (CZE)	
(Turkey) Grand Prix Apollon Temple	5 February 2023	1.2	Sevinch Yuldasheva (UZB)	Ekaterina Knebeleva (UZB)	Faina Potapova (KAZ)	
(Cyprus) Aphrodite Cycling Race Women for future	4 February 2023	1.2	Antri Christoforou (CYP)	Urša Pintar (SVN)	Barbara Malcotti (ITA)	
(Spain) Clásica de Almería	11 February 2023	1.1	Émilie Fortin (CAN)	Alison Jackson (CAN)	Floortje Mackaij (NED)	
(Cyprus) Aphrodite Cycling Race RR	11 February 2023	1.2	Jesse Vandenbulcke (BEL)	Antri Christoforou (CYP)	Urša Pintar (SVN)	
(Belgium) Omloop van het Hageland	26 February 2023	1.1	Lorena Wiebes (NED)	Marta Bastianelli (ITA)	Audrey Cordon-Ragot (FRA)	
(Belgium) Le Samyn des Dames	28 February 2023	1.1	Marta Bastianelli (ITA)	Maria Giulia Confalonieri (ITA)	Vittoria Guazzini (ITA)	
(Croatia) Trofej Umag	1 March 2023	1.2	Alessia Vigilia (ITA)	Anastasia Carbonari (LVA)	Urša Pintar (SVN)	
(Croatia) Trofej Poreč	5 March 2023	1.1	Yanina Kuskova (UZB)	Lara Gillespie (IRL)	Urša Pintar (SVN)	
(Italy) Trofeo Oro in Euro – Women's Bike Race	5 March 2023	1.1	Gaia Realini (ITA)	Amanda Spratt (AUS)	Martina Alzini (ITA)	
(Belgium) GP Oetingen	8 March 2023	1.1	Cancelled due to snow.			
(Netherlands) Drentse Acht van Westerveld	10 March 2023	1.1	Race cancelled due to weather conditions (snow).			
(Belgium) Scheldeprijs	5 April 2023	1.1	Lorena Wiebes (NED)	Charlotte Kool (NED)	Chiara Consonni (ITA)	
(Belgium) Ronde de Mouscron	10 April 2023	1.1	Martina Fidanza (ITA)	Anniina Ahtosalo (FIN)	Valentine Fortin (FRA)	
(Panama) Elite Road Central American Championships ITT	14 April 2023	1.2	Wendy Ducreux (PAN)	Annibel Emilia Prieto (PAN)	Maria Fernanda Sánchez (CRC)	
(France) Grand Prix Féminin de Chambéry	16 April 2023	1.1	Victorie Guilman (FRA)	Erica Magnaldi (ITA)	Évita Muzic (FRA)	
(Panama) Elite Road Central American Championships RR	16 April 2023	1.2	Maria Fernanda Sánchez (CRC)	Paula Guillén Rivera (GUA)	Milagro Mena (CRC)	
(Netherlands) Omloop van Borsele	22 April 2023	1.1	Linda Zanetti (SUI)	Audrey Cordon-Ragot (FRA)	Nora Tveit (NOR)	
(Italy) Gran Premio della Liberazione	25 April 2023	1.2	Silvia Zanardi (ITA)	Cristina Tonetti (ITA)	Giorgia Bariani (ITA)	
(Belgium) Leiedal Koerse	39 April 2023	1.2	Julia Kopecký (CZE)	Daria Pikulik (POL)	Lieke Nooijen (NED)	
(Spain) ReVolta	30 April 2023	1.1	Claire Steels (GBR)	Clara Koppenburg (GER)	Josie Talbot (AUS)	
(France) La Classique Morbihan	5 May 2023	1.1	Gaia Masetti (ITA)	Alessia Vigilia (ITA)	Sofia Bertizzolo (ITA)	
(France) Grand Prix du Morbihan Féminin	6 May 2023	1.1	Grace Brown (AUS)	Cédrine Kerbaol (FRA)	Dominika Włodarczyk (POL)	
(Belgium) GP Eco-Struct	6 May 2023	1.1	Amalie Dideriksen (DEN)	Lara Gillespie (IRL)	Mirre Knaven (NED)	
(Belgium) Trofee Maarten Wynants	7 May 2023	1.1	Chiara Consonni (ITA)	Amalie Dideriksen (DEN)	Maria Martins (POR)	
(Uzbekistan) The Tour Oqtosh – Chorvoq – Mountain Ladies	10 May 2023	1.2	Olga Zabelinskaya (UZB)	Yanina Kuskova (UZB)	Rinata Sultanova (KAZ)	
(Uzbekistan) The Tour Oqtosh – Chorvoq – Mountain Ladies II	11 May 2023	1.2	Margarita Misyurina (UZB)	Rinata Sultanova (KAZ)	Sofiya Karimova (UZB)	
(Uzbekistan) Tour of Bostonliq I	13 May 2023	1.2	Yanina Kuskova (UZB)	Olga Zabelinskaya (UZB)	Rinata Sultanova (KAZ)	
(Uzbekistan) Tour of Bostonliq II	14 May 2023	1.2	Yanina Kuskova (UZB)	Olga Zabelinskaya (UZB)	Margarita Misyurina (UZB)	
(Spain) Durango-Durango Emakumeen Saria	16 May 2023	1.1	Ashleigh Moolman (RSA)	Ane Santesteban (ESP)	Claire Steels (GBR)	
(Netherlands) Arnhem–Veenendaal Classic	19 May 2023	1.1	Lotte Kopecky (BEL)	Martina Fidanza (ITA)	Daria Pikulik (POL)	
(Netherlands) Omloop der Kempen	20 May 2023	1.2	Charlotte Kool (NED)	Daria Pikulik (POL)	Maike van der Duin (NED)	
(Belgium) Antwerp Port Epic Ladies	21 May 2023	1.1	Marthe Truyen (BEL)	Franziska Koch (GER)	Audrey Cordon-Ragot (FRA)	
Ladies Tour of Estonia	27 May 2023	1.2	Olga Shekel (UKR)	Kathrin Schweinberger (AUT)	Kristel Sandra Soonik (EST)	
(Spain) Gran Premio Ciudad de Eibar	28 May 2023	1.1	Olivia Baril (CAN)	Sheyla Gutiérrez (ESP)	Yuliia Biriukova (UKR)	
(Belgium) GP Mazda Schelkens	29 May 2023	1.2	Dina Scavone (BEL)	Marthe Truyen (BEL)	Katrijn De Clercq (BEL)	
(Belgium) Dwars door de Westhoek	4 June 2023	1.1	Pfeiffer Georgi (GBR)	Léa Curinier (FRA)	Charlotte Kool (NED)	
(France) Alpes Grésivaudan Classic	4 June 2023	1.1	Évita Muzic (FRA)	Urša Pintar (SVN)	Morgane Coston (FRA)	
(Belgium) Dwars door het Hageland	10 June 2023	1.1	Lotte Kopecky (BEL)	Christina Schweinberger (AUT)	Pfeiffer Georgi (GBR)	
(Belgium) Flanders Diamond Tour	11 June 2023	1.1	Julie De Wilde (BEL)	Kathrin Schweinberger (AUT)	Katrijn De Clercq (BEL)	
(Slovakia) Regiónom Nitrianskeho Kraja	17 June 2023	1.2	Nora Jenčušová (SVK)	Rotem Gafinovitz (ISR)	Antri Christoforou (CYP)	
(Slovakia) GP of the Mayor of the city Žiar nad Hronom	1 July 2023	1.2	Antri Christoforou (CYP)	Nora Jenčušová (SVK)	Rotem Gafinovitz (ISR)	
(Germany) Tour de Berlin Feminin	2 July 2023	1.2	Elena Hartmann (SUI)	Marith Vanhove (BEL)	Martina Alzini (ITA)	
Respect Ladies Race Slovakia	8 July 2023	1.2	Linda Zanetti (SUI)	Dominika Wlodarczyk (POL)	Urša Pintar (SVN)	
(Belgium) Argenta Classic	9 July 2023	1.2	Lieke Nooijen (NED)	Julie Hendrickx (BEL)	Millie Couzens (GBR)	
(Germany) Grand Prix Stuttgart en Region	16 July 2023	1.2	Elena Pirrone (ITA)	Kathrin Schweinberger (AUT)	Linda Riedmann (GER)	
(France) Kreiz Breizh Elites Dames	1 August 2023	1.2	Giorgia Vettorello (ITA)	Quinty Schoens (NED)	Barbara Malcotti (ITA)	
(France) La Périgord Ladies	12 August 2023	1.2	Amber Kraak (NED)	Jade Wiel (FRA)	Clara Emond (CAN)	
(France) La Picto–Charentaise	13 August 2023	1.2	Gladys Verhulst (FRA)	Carlijn Achtereekte (NED)	Valentina Basilico (ITA)	
(Belgium) Grote Prijs Yvonne Reynders	15 August 2023	1.2	Eline van Rooijen (NED)	Sanne Cant (BEL)	Kirstie van Haaften (NED)	
(Belgium) Konvert Koerse	18 August 2023	1.1	Daria Pikulik (POL)	Julie De Wilde (BEL)	Valentine Fortin (FRA)	
(Belgium) GP Oetingen	19 August 2023	1.1	Simone Boilard (CAN)	Evy Kuijpers (NED)	Maaike Boogaard (NED)	
(Turkey) Grand Prix Kaisareia	19 August 2023	1.2	Olga Zabelinskaya (UZB)	Somayeh Yazdani (IRI)	Yanina Kuskova (UZB)	
(Belgium) Egmont Cycling Race Women	22 August 2023	1.2	Heidi Franz (USA)	Scarlett Souren (NED)	Danique Braam (NED)	
(Belgium) Grote prijs Beerens	3 September 2023	1.1	Chiara Consonni (ITA)	Martina Fidanza (ITA)	Sofie van Rooijen (NED)	
À travers les Hauts-de-France	9 September 2023	1.2	Valentine Fortin (FRA)	Christine Majerus (LUX)	Marthe Truyen (BEL)	
(France) La Choralis Fourmies Féminine	10 September 2023	1.2	Marta Lach (POL)	Sofie van Rooijen (NED)	Marthe Truyen (BEL)	
(Belgium) Grisette Grand Prix de Wallonie	13 September 2023	1.2	Marta Lach (POL)	Silvia Persico (ITA)	Victoire Berteau (FRA)	
(Canada) Chrono Féminin de la Gatineau	15 September 2023	1.1	Anna Kiesenhofer (AUT)	Amber Neben (USA)	Emily Ehrlich (USA)	
(Canada) Tour de Gatineau	16 September 2023	1.1	Megan Jastrab (USA)	Alison Jackson (CAN)	Skylar Schneider (USA)	
(France) Grand Prix d'Isbergues féminin	17 September 2023	1.2	Valentine Fortin (FRA)	Jade Wiel (FRA)	Simone Boilard (CAN)	
(France) Binche Chimay Binche pour Dames	3 October 2023	1.1	Pfeiffer Georgi (GBR)	Christina Schweinberger (AUT)	Anniina Ahtosalo (FIN)	
(Italy) Tre Valli Varesine	3 October 2023	1.2	Liane Lippert (GER)	Cecilie Uttrup Ludwig (DEN)	Elisa Balsamo (ITA)	
(Brazil) GP Internacional de Ciclismo de Santa Catarina Femenina	3 October 2023	1.2	Paula Carrasco (COL)	Margarita Misyurina (UZB)	Ana Vitória Magalhães (BRA)	
(Brazil) GP Urubici de Ciclismo Femenina	4 October 2023	1.2	Vanesa Martínez (COL)	Ana Vitória Magalhães (BRA)	Thayná Araujo (BRA)	
(Brazil) Grand Tour de Ciclismo de SC Femenina	5 October 2023	1.2	Elizabeth Castaño (COL)	Ana Vitória Magalhães (BRA)	Sara Moreno (COL)	
(Guadeloupe) Caribbean Road Championships	12 October 2023	1.2	Gabriella Arnold (BER)	Nicole Erato (SMA)	Séverine Ferdinand (GLP)	
(Guadeloupe) Caribbean Road Championships	12 October 2023	1.2U	Kélyane Julus (MTQ)	Liana de Medeiros (BER)		
(France) Chrono des Nations	15 October 2023	1.1	Anna Kiesenhofer (AUT)	Christina Schweinberger (AUT)	Valeriya Kononenko (UKR)	
(Guadeloupe) Caribbean Road Championships	15 October 2023	1.2	Evelyne Clémence Briche (GLP)	Llori Sharpe (JAM)	Béatrice Peronet (MTQ)	
(Guadeloupe) Caribbean Road Championships	15 October 2023	1.2U	Kélyane Julus (MTQ)	Belkis Ardenne Clerence (FRA)	Liana de Medeiros (BER)	

== Single day races (1.NE) ==
Race	Date	Cat. †	Winner	Second	Third	Ref
(Brazil) Pré Jasc	16 October 2022	1.NE	Patrícia Daniele Andrade (BRA)	Bruna Strube Lima (BRA)	Pietra Picolo Meneghini (BRA)	
(Chinese Taipei) Taiwan KOM Challenge	28 October 2022	1.NE	Sheng Hsin-chiu (TPE)	Cheng Shih-hsuan (TPE)	Wang Ling-hui (TPE)	
(Rwanda) Kibeho Race	12 November 2022	1.NE	Josiane Mukashema (RWA)	Jacqueline Tuyishimire (RWA)	Diane Ingabire (RWA)	
(Brazil) Jasc ITT	17 November 2022	1.NE	Tamires Fanny Radatz (BRA)	Taise Benato (BRA)	Bruna Strube Lima (BRA)	
(South Africa) 947 Ride Joburg	20 November 2022	1.NE	Vera Looser (NAM)	Tiffany Keep (RSA)	Kimberley Le Court (MRI)	
(Argentina) Vuelta de la Ciudad de Buenos Aires	20 November 2022	1.NE	Daniela Romina Jobse (ARG)	Mariana García Britos (URU)	Sofía Martelli (ARG)	
(Burkina Faso) GP du President de la Federation	20 November 2022	1.NE	Lamoussa Zoungrana (BUR)	Awa Bamogo (BUR)	Houlda Zongo (BUR)	
(Brazil) Jasc Road Race	20 November 2022	1.NE	Tamires Fanny Radatz (BRA)	Karen Olímpio (BRA)	Taise Benato (BRA)	
(Guam) Oceania Pacific Championships ITT	9 December 2022	1.NE	Céline Hirzel (NCL)	Sandrine Frogier (NCL)	Robyn Spaeth (NMI)	
(Guam) Oceania Pacific Championships RR	11 December 2022	1.NE	Céline Hirzel (NCL)	Mieko Carey (GUM)	Sandrine Frogier (NCL)	
(Argentina) Gran Premio Lanfran Fox	11 December 2022	1.NE	Agustina Fernández (ARG)	Daniela Romina Jobse (ARG)	Alejandra Prezioso (ARG)	
(Argentina) Gran Premio Indubike	17 December 2022	1.NE	Valentina Luna (ARG)	Valeria Evangelista (ARG)	Daniela Romina Jobse (ARG)	
(Bermuda) BBA Presidents Race	18 December 2022	1.NE	Caitlin Conyers (BER)	Erica Hawley (BER)	Annabelle Miller (BER)	
(Argentina) Nocturno en Azul	22 December 2022	1.NE	Tania Ponce De León (ARG)	Lucrecia Hernández (ARG)	Valentina Oliván (ARG)	
(Belize) KREM New Years' Day Cycling Classic	1 January 2023	1.NE	Kaya Cattouse (BLZ)	Mariana Valdéz (MEX)	Kedisha Francis (BLZ)	
(Australia) Australian Criterium Championship	6 January 2023	1.NE	Amber Pate (AUS)	Alexandra Manly (AUS)	Matilda Field (AUS)	
(Colombia) Circuito Feria de Manizales	9 January 2023	1.NE	Diana Peñuela (COL)	Valery Londoño Ruiz (COL)	Natalia Carmona (COL)	
(Australia) Schwalbe Classic	14 January 2023	1.NE	Ally Wollaston (NZL)	Michaela Drummond (NZL)	Nina Buijsman (NED)	
(Australia) Trek Night Riders Criterium	21 January 2023	1.NE	Gladys Verhulst (FRA)	Clara Copponi (FRA)	Nina Buijsman (NED)	
(Venezuela) Clásico Femenino de la Vuelta al Táchira	22 January 2023	1.NE	Ingrid Porras (VEN)	Liseth Carrero (COL)	Rosimber Montaña Pineda (VEN)	
New Zealand Criterium Championship	23 January 2023	1.NE	Ally Wollaston (NZL)	Bryony Botha (NZL)	Sammie Maxwell (NZL)	
(Turkey) Expo Kriteryum	29 January 2023	1.NE	Yanina Kuskova (UZB)	Faina Potapova (KAZ)	Madina Kakhkhorova (UZB)	
(Australia) Melbourne to Warrnambool	5 February 2023	1.NE	Sophie Edwards (AUS)	Chloe Hosking (AUS)	Matilda Raynolds (AUS)	
(United States) Flapjack Flats ITT	12 February 2023	1.NE	Emily Ehrlich (USA)	Kendall Chase (USA)	Laurel Quinones (USA)	
(South Africa) South African Criterium Championship	13 February 2023	1.NE	Hayley Preen (RSA)	Maroesjka Matthee (RSA)	Taneal Otto (RSA)	
(Namibia) Nedbank Cycle Challenge	13 February 2023	1.NE	Risa Dreyer (NAM)	Belinda Van Rhyn (NAM)	Nicola Fester (NAM)	
(France) Circuit des Plages Vendéennes Montaigu	18 February 2023	1.NE	Constance Marchand (FRA)	Lise Ménage (FRA)	Justine Gegu (NAM)	
(France) Circuit des Plages Vendéennes Saint-Hilaire-de-Riez TTT	19 February 2023	1.NE	(France) Lanester Women Morbihan	(France) Team Breizh Ladies	(France) Team ELLES	
(Cyprus) Elmasco – Prorider Endurance Race	19 February 2023	1.NE	Constantina Georgiou (CYP)	Demetra Koukouma (CYP)	Eleni Koukouma (CYP)	
(South Africa) Herald Cycle Tour	19 February 2023	1.NE	Hayley Preen (RSA)	Maroesjka Matthee (RSA)	Juanita Mackenzie (RSA)	
(Belgium) Women's Cycling Series #1	26 February 2023	1.NE	Femke Beuling (NED)	Julie Stockman (BEL)	Noa Jansen (NED)	
(Burkina Faso) GP 14	26 February 2023	1.NE	Awa Bamogo (BUR)	Lamoussa Zoungrana (BUR)	Clarisse Bilgo (BUR)	
(France) Circuit Communes Vallée du Bedat	26 February 2023	1.NE	Aurore Pernollet (FRA)	Emeline Courtot (FRA)	Diane Frouard (FRA)	
(Belgium) GP Arlette	4 March 2023	1.NE	Anniina Ahtosalo (FIN)	Linda Riedmann (GER)	Noemi Rüegg (SUI)	
(Turkey) Alanya Cup	4 March 2023	1.NE	Akpeiil Ossim (KAZ)	Rinata Sultanova (KAZ)	Marina Ivanuk (UKR)	
(Spain) GP Cantabria Deporte	5 March 2023	1.NE	Lucía Ruiz (ESP)	Susana Pérez (ESP)	Isabel Martín (ESP)	
(France) Prix Autopieces Auvergne	5 March 2023	1.NE	Anouk Bruget (FRA)	Léa Guglielmini (FRA)	Elise Faugeron (FRA)	
(France) Open de Pleyben	5 March 2023	1.NE	Titia Ryo (FRA)	Elisa Lemétayer (FRA)	Sylvia Le Gleut (FRA)	
(Burkina Faso) GP du FNPSL	11 March 2023	1.NE	Lamoussa Zoungrana (BUR)	Awa Bamogo (BUR)	Houlda Zongo (BUR)	
(Netherlands) ProMobility Ladies Cycling Circuit #1	11 March 2023	1.NE	Lisa Petersen (NED)	Yvet Schoonewille (NED)	Sanne Prins (NED)	
(Spain) Copa Castilla	11 March 2023	1.NE	Claudia San Justo (ESP)	Claudia Pérez (ESP)	Ángela Fernández (ESP)	
(Belgium) Ronde de Beernem	12 March 2023	1.NE	Lotte Popelier (BEL)	Karlijn Koops (NED)	Lani Wittevrongel (BEL)	
(South Africa) Cape Town Cycle Tour	12 March 2023	1.NE	Kimberley Le Court (MRI)	Vera Looser (NAM)	Ashleigh Moolman (RSA)	
(United Kingdom) Capernwray Road Race	12 March 2023	1.NE	Cat Ferguson (GBR)	Samantha Stuart (GBR)	Ellen McDermott (IRL)	
(France) Route De L’Ouest Féminine #1	12 March 2023	1.NE	Justine Gegu (FRA)	Kloé Saugrain (FRA)	Marine Cloarec (FRA)	
(France) Boucles de Seine-et-Marne	12 March 2023	1.NE	Camille Fahy (FRA)	Coline Raby (FRA)	Sandrine Bideau (FRA)	
(France) Prix de la Zone Industrielle de Cusset	12 March 2023	1.NE	Anouk Bruget (FRA)	Coralie Savina (FRA)	Laëtitia Turpin (FRA)	
(Mexico) Copa Zapopan	12 March 2023	1.NE	Alexis Ryan (USA)	Valeria León (MEX)	Carime Flores (MEX)	
(Spain) Copa Castilla	12 March 2023	1.NE	Claudia San Justo (ESP)	Nora Silva (ESP)	Cristina García (ESP)	
1ª Taça de Portugal Femininas	12 March 2023	1.NE	Cristiana Valente (POR)	Katiuska García (VEN)	Liliana Jesus (POR)	
(Netherlands) Ronde van Oud-Vossemeer	18 March 2023	1.NE	Maartje Redder (NED)	Anne Knijnenburg (NED)	Lisa van Belle (NED)	
(Spain) GP Igartza	19 March 2023	1.NE	Lucía Ruiz (ESP)	Justyna Czapla (GER)	Claudia San Justo (ESP)	
(France) Route De L’Ouest Féminine #2	19 March 2023	1.NE	Justine Gegu (FRA)	Floraine Bernard (FRA)	Marine Maugé (FRA)	
(France) Challenge Interrégional Féminin	19 March 2023	1.NE	Éloïse Prévoteau (FRA)	Léane Tabu (FRA)	Lise Ménage (FRA)	
(Switzerland) Primeo Energie - ASOC-Cup I	19 March 2023	1.NE	Linda Zanetti (SUI)	Elisa Valtulini (ITA)	Natalia Franco (COL)	
(Belgium) Ladies Cycling Trophy #1	19 March 2023	1.NE	Elinor Barker (GBR)	Noemi Rüegg (SUI)	Marieke Meert (BEL)	
KPMG Bermuda TTT	19 March 2023	1.NE	(Bermuda) VT Construction	(Bermuda) Bicycle Works Team	(Bermuda) BJC	
(Germany) Herforder Frühjahrspreis	19 March 2023	1.NE	Wendy Oosterwoud (NED)	Lydia Ventker (GER)	Emma van Deursen (NED)	
(Germany) Bellheimer Frühjahrskriterium	19 March 2023	1.NE	Nadja Moster (GER)	Jette Simon (GER)	Janina Bender (GER)	
(Germany) elektroland24 S-Cup #1	19 March 2023	1.NE	Marla Sigmund (GER)	Jorid Behn (GER)	Cordula Biermann (GER)	
(Netherlands) TT Circuit Assen	22 March 2023	1.NE	Juliet Eickhof (NED)	Anne Knijnenburg (NED)	Rose Kloese (NED)	
(France) Boucles Guegonnaises #2	25 March 2023	1.NE	Constance Marchand (FRA)	Elisa Lemétayer (FRA)	Flavie Arnould (FRA)	
(Belgium) GP Victor Cornez	25 March 2023	1.NE	Manon Laurent (BEL)	Zélie Graux (BEL)	Ionela Lecoeuche (BEL)	
(Lithuania) Brevetas 200	25 March 2023	1.NE	Ilga Bāliņa (LVA)	Viktorija Tomaševičienė (LTU)	Daiva Cemnolonskiene (LTU)	
(Russia) GP Maikop #1	25 March 2023	1.NE	Hanna Tserakh (BLR)	Iryna Chuyankova (BLR)	Elizaveta Archibasova (RUS)	
(United States) Maverick Classics Criterium	25 March 2023	1.NE	Olivia Cummins (USA)	Grace Arlandson (USA)	Ava Hachmann (USA)	
(Germany) Rund um den Lousberg	25 March 2023	1.NE	Svenja Betz (GER)	Dorothea Heitzmann (GER)	Bianca Lust (NED)	
(France) Boucles Guegonnaises #1	26 March 2023	1.NE	Julie Bego (FRA)	Ségolène Thomas (FRA)	Amandine Fouquenet (FRA)	
(United Kingdom) UK National Road Series #1	26 March 2023	1.NE	Jessica Finney (GBR)	Monica Greenwood (GBR)	Flora Perkins (GBR)	
(Austria) Eröffnungsrennen Leonding	26 March 2023	1.NE	Katharina Fox (GER)	Nela Slaníková (CZE)	Lydia Ventker (GER)	
(Italy) Giornata Rosa in Friuli	26 March 2023	1.NE	Silvia Zanardi (ITA)	Valentina Basilico (ITA)	Elisa De Vallier (ITA)	
(Spain) GP Cidade de Pontevedra	26 March 2023	1.NE	Cécile Lejeune (FRA)	Alba Teruel (ESP)	Eneritz Vadillo (ESP)	
(Switzerland) Primeo Energie - ASOC-Cup II	26 March 2023	1.NE	Nicole Suter (SUI)	Maude Le Roux (RSA)	Eyeru Tesfoam Gebru (ETH)	
(Rwanda) Kivu Belt Race	26 March 2023	1.NE	Xaverine Nirere (RWA)	Josiane Mukashema (RWA)	Djazilla Umwamikazi (RWA)	
(Belgium) Women's Cycling Series #2	26 March 2023	1.NE	Marieke Meert (BEL)	Janet Ketellapper (NED)	Femke Beuling (NED)	
(Russia) GP Maikop #2	26 March 2023	1.NE	Nastassia Kiptsikava (BLR)	Katsiaryna Rusak (BLR)	Hanna Tserakh (BLR)	
(United States) Maverick Classics Road Race	26 March 2023	1.NE	Natalie Quinn (USA)	Madigan Munro (USA)	Ruby Ryan (USA)	
(United States) Santa Cruz Classic Criterium	26 March 2023	1.NE	Paige Onweller (USA)	Melanie Wong (USA)	Danielle Morshead (USA)	
(Germany) Großer Benotti Straßenpreis	26 March 2023	1.NE	Inka Tulowitzki (GER)	Sophie Ochmann (GER)	Monika Hübler (GER)	
(Germany) Rund um Merken	26 March 2023	1.NE	Anna Zöll (GER)	Iris Timmermans (NED)	Svenja Betz (GER)	
(Germany) Großer Auto Neuser Preis	26 March 2023	1.NE	Anja Bertleff (GER)	Viktoria Dehler (GER)	Kristina Vöckl (GER)	
(Netherlands) Volta Limburg Classic	1 April 2023	1.NE	Mischa Bredewold (NED)	Lonneke Uneken (NED)	Noëlle Rüetschi (SUI)	
(Denmark) HurtigJoakimLøbet	1 April 2023	1.NE	Marita Jensen (DEN)	Kathrine Olivia Madsen (DEN)	Solbjørk Anderson (DEN)	
(Belgium) Ladies Cycling Trophy #2	1 April 2023	1.NE	Lani Wittevrongel (BEL)	Dina Scavone (BEL)	Marga López (ESP)	
(United Kingdom) RCR Fatcreations Goodwood RR	1 April 2023	1.NE	Jessica Finney (GBR)	Zoe Langham (GBR)	Lucy Lee (GBR)	
(Netherlands) Van Wonen Omloop van Herxen	1 April 2023	1.NE	Femke Beuling (NED)	Rose Kloese (NED)	Iris van der Kolk (NED)	
(Bermuda) Winners Edge ITT	2 April 2023	1.NE	Panzy Olander (BER)	Annabelle Miller (BER)	Charlotte Millington (BER)	
(Switzerland) Primeo Energie - ASOC-Cup III	2 April 2023	1.NE	Elena Hartmann (SUI)	Maude Le Roux (RSA)	Annabel Fisher (GBR)	
(Italy) Gran Premio Esperia in Rosa	2 April 2023	1.NE	Valentina Basilico (ITA)	Carmela Cipriani (ITA)	Francesca Pellegrini (ITA)	
(Denmark) Meldgaardløbet	2 April 2023	1.NE	Mia Sofie Rützou (DEN)	Lea Lützen (GER)	Kathrine Olivia Madsen (DEN)	
(Denmark) Ronde van Borum	2 April 2023	1.NE	Flora-Anne Jørgensen (DEN)	Annelie Petersen (DEN)	Karoline Risager Schmidt (DEN)	
(Australia) Tour De Brisbane	2 April 2023	1.NE	Haylee Fuller (AUS)	Gina Ricardo (AUS)	Chloe Moran (AUS)	
(Netherlands) Wielerronde van Oploo om de Gouden Helm Trofee	2 April 2023	1.NE	Mieke Kröger (GER)	Anne Knijnenburg (NED)	Elisa Serné (NED)	
(Germany) Preis der RSG Buchenau	2 April 2023	1.NE	Corinna Lechner (GER)	Nina Luge (GER)	Mareike Spindler (GER)	
(Germany) INTERSTUHL CUP FN	2 April 2023	1.NE	Marina Knoll (GER)	Claudia Marek (GER)	Lisa Lorenz (GER)	
(Switzerland) Dienstagabendrennen Möhlin	4 April 2023	1.NE	Laurin Bachmann (SUI)			
(Switzerland) Tour du Canton de Fribourg I	5 April 2023	1.NE	Dieuwertje Modder (NED)	Julie Thiémard (SUI)	Siham Es Sad (MAR)	
(Denmark) GP Ejner Hessel	6 April 2023	1.NE	Marita Jensen (DEN)	Caroline Kirk Schad (DEN)	Christina Bragh Lorenzen (DEN)	
(Belgium) Provinciaal Kampioenschap Oost-Vlaanderen ITT U23	6 April 2023	1.NE	Eefje Brandt (BEL)	Anne-Sophie Dooms (BEL)	Cleo Kiekens (BEL)	
(Belgium) Provinciaal Kampioenschap Oost-Vlaanderen	6 April 2023	1.NE	Hanna Theys (BEL)	Lensy Debboudt (BEL)	Febe Schokkaert (BEL)	
(Switzerland) GP Osterhas	8 April 2023	1.NE	Alessandra Keller (SUI)	Lorena Leu (SUI)	Annika Liehner (SUI)	
(United States) Miami Beach Race	8 April 2023	1.NE	(United States) Denver Disruptors	(United States) Miami Nights	(United States) Alpine Carbon p/b Levine Law Group	
(Italy) Pasqualando	8 April 2023	1.NE	Milena del Sarto (ITA)	Lara Scarselli (ITA)	Camilla Locatelli (ITA)	
(Netherlands) Zuiderzeeronde	8 April 2023	1.NE	Eline van Rooijen (NED)	Carmen van der Veen (NED)	Femke Beuling (NED)	
(United Kingdom) Witham Hall Grand Prix	9 April 2023	1.NE	Lucy Neatham (GBR)	Carys Lloyd (GBR)	Lucy Glover (GBR)	
(France) Tour-du-Pin	9 April 2023	1.NE	Sandrine Etienne Ep Wiccart (FRA)	Julia Aubry (FRA)	Nina Lavenu (FRA)	
(Denmark) En Forårsdag i Hell-singør	9 April 2023	1.NE	Matilda Frantzich (SWE)	Line Krog West (DEN)		
(Netherlands) Grote Ronde van Gerwen	10 April 2023	1.NE	Elisa Serné (NED)	Anna van Wersch (NED)	Anne Knijnenburg (NED)	
(Belgium) Ronde van Ruiselede	10 April 2023	1.NE	Saartje Vandenbroucke (BEL)	Monica Greenwood (GBR)	Lensy Debboudt (BEL)	
(Italy) Trofeo Rosa Citta di Cantu	10 April 2023	1.NE	Federica Venturelli (ITA)	Carmela Cipriani (ITA)	Matilde Vitillo (ITA)	
(France) Prix de la Ville du Mont Pujols	10 April 2023	1.NE	Alice Coutinho (FRA)	Mélanie Dupin (FRA)	Marine Maugé (FRA)	
(France) Coupe de Bretagne #1	10 April 2023	1.NE	Sylvia Le Gleut (FRA)	Laura Guégan (FRA)	Josephine Denieul (FRA)	
(Germany) Großer Osterpreis der Baden	10 April 2023	1.NE	Mira Winkelhag (GER)	Elisa Sassmann (GER)	Lisa Weber (GER)	
(Germany) Bergmeisterschaft Nordrhein-Westfalen	10 April 2023	1.NE	Nele Laing (GER)	Lara Röhrich (GER)	Karoline Goldschmidt (GER)	
(Germany) Rund um Schönaich	10 April 2023	1.NE	Corinna Lechner (GER)	Clarissa Mai (GER)	Janine Schneider (GER)	
(Switzerland) Dienstagabendrennen Möhlin	11 April 2023	1.NE	Laurin Bachmann (SUI)			
(Belgium) Provinciaal Kampioenschap Antwerpen U23	13 April 2023	1.NE	Sterre Vervloet (BEL)	Kato Aerts (BEL)	Lisse Ceulemans (BEL)	
(Belgium) Provinciaal Kampioenschap Antwerpen	13 April 2023	1.NE	Rosanne Breugelmans (BEL)	Chantal Fouwé (BEL)		
(Latvia) Dobele Cup	13 April 2023	1.NE	Kristel Sandra Soonik (EST)	Silvia Türkson (EST)	Madara Āboma (LVA)	
(Czech Republic) Brilon Cup #1	15 April 2023	1.NE	Kateřina Hladíková (CZE)	Nela Slaníková (CZE)	Nicole Hartychová (CZE)	
(Belgium) Ladies Cycling Trophy #3	15 April 2023	1.NE	Monica Greenwood (GBR)	Fleur Moors (BEL)	Marieke Meert (BEL)	
(Denmark) Næstved BC Tempoløbet	15 April 2023	1.NE	Laura Auerbach-Lind (DEN)	Rebecca Koerner (DEN)	Mia Sofie Rützou (DEN)	
(Italy) Porto Sant'Elpidio Cycling Festival	15 April 2023	1.NE	Beatrice Rossato (ITA)	Martina Sanfilippo (ITA)	Alessia Patuelli (ITA)	
(Sweden) Östgötatempot	15 April 2023	1.NE	Ebba Granqvist (SWE)	Lovisa Nyman (SWE)	Carin Winell (SWE)	
(France) Championnat Auvergne-Rhône-Alpes TTT	15 April 2023	1.NE	(France) Team Féminin Chambéry	(France) CD Isère	(France) Hexagone - Corbas Lyon Métropole	
(Spain) Copa Castilla	15 April 2023	1.NE	Alicja Ulatowska (POL)	Beatriz Martínez (ESP)	Marta Rosillo (ESP)	
(Czech Republic) Brilon Cup #2	16 April 2023	1.NE	Eliška Kvasničková (CZE)	Denisa Slámová (CZE)		
(Belgium) Ronde van Denderhoutem	16 April 2023	1.NE	Monica Greenwood (GBR)	Saartje Vandenbroucke (BEL)	Hanna Theys (BEL)	
(France) GP Chambéry Elite Open	16 April 2023	1.NE	Lore De Schepper (BEL)	Noémie Daumas (FRA)	Célia Gery (FRA)	
(France) Coupe de Bretagne	16 April 2023	1.NE	Maylis Sarron (FRA)	Elisa Lemetayer (FRA)	Alice Harnois (FRA)	
(Switzerland) GP de Semsales	16 April 2023	1.NE	Kayla Davis (USA)	Lena Moisescu (GER)	Adar Shriki (ISR)	
(Italy) Gran Premio Citta di Corridonia	16 April 2023	1.NE	Federica Venturelli (ITA)	Carmela Cipriani (ITA)	Sara Piffer (ITA)	
(Finland) Lattomeriajo	16 April 2023	1.NE	Ursula Lindén (FIN)	Suvi Pitkänen (FIN)	Emilia Holmila (FIN)	
(Denmark) Slagelse Løbet	16 April 2023	1.NE	Rebecca Koerner (DEN)	Christina Bragh (DEN)	Marie-Louise Hartz Krogager (DEN)	
(Sweden) Östgötaloppet	16 April 2023	1.NE	Ebba Granqvist (SWE)	Johanna Palmqvist (SWE)	Maja Johansson (SWE)	
(Spain) Copa Castilla	16 April 2023	1.NE	Violeta Hernández Díaz (ESP)	Ángela Fernández (ESP)	María Varo (ESP)	
(Denmark) Forårsløbet	16 April 2023	1.NE	Kristina Købsted (DEN)	Henriette Pipenbring Mikkelsen (DEN)	Pernille Bovbjerg (DEN)	
(Denmark) Rundt om Rold	16 April 2023	1.NE	Marianne Hald (DEN)	Anna Damgaard Eriksen (DEN)	Cecilie Porsdal (DEN)	
(Bermuda) BRCC Criterium	16 April 2023	1.NE	Annabelle Miller (BER)	Panzy Olander (BER)	Jennifer Lightbourne (IRL)	
(Germany) Radrenntag im Park Bocholt	16 April 2023	1.NE	Lydia Ventker (GER)	Marit Cent (NED)	Marlene Cleves (GER)	
(Germany) Rund an der Nahner Waldbahn	16 April 2023	1.NE	Bianca Bernhard (GER)	Jorid Behn (GER)	Janina Bender (GER)	
(Switzerland) Tour du Canton de Fribourg II	16 April 2023	1.NE	Nofar Maoz (ISR)	Kayla Davis (USA)	Lena Moisescu (GER)	
(Switzerland) Circuit de Saint-Triphon	19 April 2023	1.NE	Annabel Fisher (GBR)	Nofar Maoz (ISR)	Luciana Roland (ARG)	
(Estonia) Tõravere TT I	19 April 2023	1.NE	Anette Zukker (EST)	Triin Kull (EST)	Helena Peik (EST)	
Greece U23 National Championship ITT	21 April 2023	1.NE	Eirini Maria Karousou (GRE)	Glykeria Angelaki (GRE)	Eleni Kokoliou (GRE)	
(Netherlands) Omloop van Borsele ITT	21 April 2023	1.NE	Ilse Pluimers (NED)	Karlijn Swinkels (NED)	Anne Knijnenburg (NED)	
Greece U23 National Championship Road Race	22 April 2023	1.NE	Eirini Maria Karousou (GRE)	Glykeria Angelaki (GRE)	Lydia Moutsiou (GRE)	
(United States) Athens Twilight Criterium	22 April 2023	1.NE	Alexis Ryan (USA)	Andrea Cyr (USA)	Erica Zaveta (USA)	
(Spain) GP Villaquilambre	22 April 2023	1.NE	Marta Romeu (ESP)	Lucía Ruiz (ESP)	Alba Teruel (ESP)	
(Russia) Russian Hill National Championship	22 April 2023	1.NE	Valeriia Sablina (RUS)	Eugenia Tretiakova (RUS)	Seda Krylova (RUS)	
(Sweden) Kinnekulleloppet	22 April 2023	1.NE	Ebba Granqvist (SWE)	Emma Varga (SWE)	Aashild Tovsrud (NOR)	
(Belgium) Test ITT Poperinge	22 April 2023	1.NE	Sterre Vervloet (BEL)	Eefje Brandt (BEL)	Saartje Vandenbroucke (BEL)	
(Netherlands) Ronde van de Vijver	22 April 2023	1.NE	Paulien Koster (NED)	Marit Cent (NED)	Sera Gademan (NED)	
(Belgium) Ladies Cycling Trophy #4	22 April 2023	1.NE	Emma Jeffers (GBR)	Camilla Bye (NOR)	Marieke Meert (BEL)	
(Finland) TS-Kortteliajot-Turku	22 April 2023	1.NE	Laura Lizette Sander (EST)	Ida Sten (FIN)	Essi Pelto-Arvo (FIN)	
(Belgium) Provinciaal Kampioenschap Limburg U23	22 April 2023	1.NE	Kato Willemoons (BEL)			
(Lithuania) Brevetas 300	22 April 2023	1.NE	Ilga Bāliņa (LVA)	Viktorija Tomaševičienė (LTU)	Daiva Cemnolonskiene (LTU)	
2ª Taça de Portugal Feminina	22 April 2023	1.NE	Liliana Jesus (POR)	Cristiana Valente (POR)	Ana Caramelo (POR)	
(Sweden) Kinnekulleloppet-Götene	23 April 2023	1.NE	Åshild Tovsrud (NOR)	Alma Johansson (SWE)		
(Denmark) Kriterium Frederikshøj	23 April 2023	1.NE	Mia Sofie Rützou (DEN)	Frederikke Asfeldt (DEN)	Michelle Hvid Hansen (DEN)	
(Finland) Simo Klimscheffskij'n Muistoajo	23 April 2023	1.NE	Laura Lizette Sander (EST)	Hanna Joronen (FIN)	Pia Pensaari (FIN)	
(Denmark) ABC Linjeløb	23 April 2023	1.NE	Marie-Louise Hartz Krogager (DEN)	Julie Nielsen Maribo (DEN)	Mie Nordlund Pedersen (DEN)	
(United States) CSU Cobb Lake Road Race	23 April 2023	1.NE	Austin Killips (USA)	Victoria Dippold (USA)	Chloe Fraser (GBR)	
(United States) CSU Oval Criterium	23 April 2023	1.NE	Lauren Zoerner (USA)	Kate Seiler (USA)	Natalie Mitchell (USA)	
(United Kingdom) Dave Peck Memorial	23 April 2023	1.NE	Ruth Shier (GBR)	Lydia Watts (GBR)	Emily Proud (GBR)	
(Spain) GP Ciclista Femenino Fuenlabrada-El Bicho	23 April 2023	1.NE	Lidia Llácer (ESP)	Elisa Tejedor (ESP)	Naomí Sánchez (VEN)	
(Austria) Kirschblütenrennen	23 April 2023	1.NE	Réka Tóth (HUN)	Nela Slaníková (CZE)	Barbora Němcová (CZE)	
(United States) LaGrange Criterium	23 April 2023	1.NE	Leah Kirchmann (CAN)	Matilda Raynolds (AUS)	Danielys García (VEN)	
(Germany) Rund um Steinfurt	23 April 2023	1.NE	Lisa Bouwers (NED)	Mira Winkelhag (GER)	Bianca Bernhard (GER)	
(Germany) Kirrlacher Kriterium	23 April 2023	1.NE	Nadja Moster (GER)	Sandra Geyer (GER)	Antje Thamm (GER)	
(Germany) Luther's Cycling Cup	23 April 2023	1.NE	Antonia Mühlbach (GER)	Larissa Luttuschka (GER)	Anna Bretschneider (GER)	
3ª Taça de Portugal Feminina	23 April 2023	1.NE	Ana Caramelo (POR)	Cristiana Valente (POR)	Celina Carpinteiro (POR)	
(Sweden) FK Trampens Allianstempo	24 April 2023	1.NE	Cecilia Lindell (SWE)			
(Switzerland) Dienstagabendrennen Möhlin	25 April 2023	1.NE	Laurin Bachmann (SUI)			
(United States) Spin the District Union City Criterium	25 April 2023	1.NE	Heather Fischer (USA)	Kendall Ryan (USA)	Erica Zaveta (USA)	
(United States) Peachtree Corners Criterium	26 April 2023	1.NE	Samantha Schneider (USA)	Matilda Raynolds (AUS)	Lizbeth Salazar (MEX)	
(Switzerland) Blonay - Les Pléiades	26 April 2023	1.NE	Thibe Deseyn (SUI)	Yael Klein (CAN)	Adar Shriki (ISR)	
(Belgium) Ladies Cycling Trophy #5	26 April 2023	1.NE	Saartje Vandenbroucke (BEL)	Marieke Meert (BEL)	Emma Jeffers (GBR)	
(Sierra Leone) Tour de Lunsar	26 April 2023	1.NE	Roxanne Hargreaves (GBR)	Blessing Jane Jabbie (SLE)	Elizabeth Mansaray (SLE)	
(Estonia) Filter Tempsari I	26 April 2023	1.NE	Silvia Türkson (EST)	Kristin Jõgi (EST)	Liisa Kull (EST)	
(Netherlands) Hoppenbrouwers Techniek Koningsronde van Almelo	27 April 2023	1.NE	Marit Cent (NED)	Maaike de Vries (NED)	Lisa Bouwers (NED)	
(United States) Spartanburg Criterium	28 April 2023	1.NE	Kendall Ryan (USA)	Leah Kirchmann (CAN)	Samantha Schneider (USA)	
(Sweden) Lyngbyloppet	29 April 2023	1.NE	Alma Johansson (SWE)	Karin Pettersson (SWE)	Lovisa Nyman (SWE)	
(Australia) Grafton to Inverell	29 April 2023	1.NE	Mia Hayden (AUS)	Talia Appleton (AUS)	Emily Watts (AUS)	
(Spain) Trofeo Bajo Andarax	29 April 2023	1.NE	Andrea Alzate (VEN)	Lucía Ruiz (ESP)	Susana Pérez (ESP)	
(United States) Spin the District Hapeville Criterium	29 April 2023	1.NE	Samantha Schneider (USA)	Lizbeth Salazar (MEX)	Kendall Ryan (USA)	
(Canada) Boucherville Criterium	29 April 2023	1.NE	Camille Desrochers Laflamme (CAN)	Julie Lacourcière (CAN)	Pénélope Primeau (CAN)	
(Denmark) Åmosen Classic	29 April 2023	1.NE	Louise Vig Clausen (DEN)			
(Denmark) Fyns Bilsalg Nordfyn Rundt	29 April 2023	1.NE	Silke Baudendistel (GER)	Katrine Myrup Laakkonen (DEN)	Eline Størzer (DEN)	
(Norway) Fara (NC)	29 April 2023	1.NE	Åshild Tovsrud (NED)	Vibeke Lystad (NOR)	Ingeborg Hestad (NOR)	
(Netherlands) Haagse Wielerdag	29 April 2023	1.NE	Lisanne Immerzeel (NED)	Maaike de Vries (NED)	Juul Hubert (NED)	
(Belgium) Ladies Cycling Trophy #6	29 April 2023	1.NE	Jo Tindley (GBR)	Sophie Lewis (GBR)	Kelly Van den Steen (BEL)	
(Burkina Faso) Siniena Tour	29 April 2023	1.NE	Awa Bamogo (BUR)	Lamoussa Zoungrana (BUR)	Pascaline Dambinga (BUR)	
(Germany) Interstuhl Cup Ottenbach	29 April 2023	1.NE	Valeria Rechenauer (GER)	Marina Knoll (GER)	Claudia Marek (GER)	
(Estonia) Otepää GP	29 April 2023	1.NE	Mari Kruuser (EST)	Ann-Christine Allik (EST)	Carol Kuuskman (EST)	
(United States) Spin the District College Park Criterium	30 April 2023	1.NE	Heather Fischer (USA)	Samantha Schneider (USA)	Lizbeth Salazar (MEX)	
(Norway) Fara Kermessritt	30 April 2023	1.NE	Vibeke Lystad (NOR)	Ingeborg Hestad (NOR)	Åshild Tovsrud (NOR)	
(Bermuda) Winners Edge Road Race	30 April 2023	1.NE	Annabelle Miller (BER)	Panzy Olander (BER)	Ashley Estwanik (BER)	
(France) Chrono 47	30 April 2023	1.NE	(France) Team Centre Val de Loire	(France) Team Breizh Ladies	(France) Team Féminin Chambéry	
(France) Clohars-Carnoët	30 April 2023	1.NE	Elisa Lemetayer (FRA)	Manon Briand (FRA)	Nolwenn Helin (FRA)	
(Denmark) Kolding BC - Pierre Ejendomme Løbet	30 April 2023	1.NE	Ellen Klinge (DEN)			
(Denmark) Hvidovre Gadeløb	30 April 2023	1.NE	Anne Holm (DEN)	Caroline Kirk Schad (DEN)	Mikka Holm (DEN)	
(Denmark) Bakkeløbet	30 April 2023	1.NE	Maria Lysdal (DEN)	Laila Søholm Mandrup (DEN)	Else Lund (DEN)	
(Sweden) Lars RP Kriterium	30 April 2023	1.NE	Matilda Frantzich (SWE)	Alma Johansson (SWE)	Ella Wahlström (SWE)	
(United Kingdom) Proper Northern Road Race Series	30 April 2023	1.NE	Cat Ferguson (GBR)	Imogen Wolff (GBR)	Mary Wilkinson (GBR)	
(Germany) LV-Meisterschaft Niedersachsen	30 April 2023	1.NE	Kimberly Miller (GER)	Katharina Julia Hinz (GER)	Bianca Bernhard (GER)	
(Germany) Rund um das Altchemnitz Center	30 April 2023	1.NE	Olivia Schoppe (GER)	Gianna Schmieder (GER)	Tessa Zwaenepoel (BEL)	
(Germany) Tag der Arbeit Zeitfahren	30 April 2023	1.NE	Adelheid Schütz (GER)	Lena Götzenberger (GER)	Anja Dinglreiter (GER)	
(Germany) Rino Cup	30 April 2023	1.NE	Isabel Kämpfert (GER)	Sabrina Zwick (GER)	Jeannine Menia (GER)	
(Germany) Mittenwalder GAAC Rennen	30 April 2023	1.NE	Selma Lantzsch (GER)	Angelina Bosse (GER)	Sam Sandten (GER)	
(Belgium) Ladies Cycling Trophy #7	30 April 2023	1.NE	Sofie van Rooijen (NED)	Scarlett Souren (NED)	Sophie Lewis (GBR)	
(Denmark) Storebæltsløbet	30 April 2023	1.NE	Henriette Pipenbring Mikkelsen (DEN)	Frederikke Olsen (DEN)	Mathilde Olsen (DEN)	
(Estonia) Otepää Rattaralli	30 April 2023	1.NE	Silvia Türkson (EST)	Ann-Christine Allik (EST)	Mari Kruuser (EST)	
(Austria) EZF Großhartmannsdorf	1 May 2023	1.NE	Anna Kofler (AUT)	Katharina Machner (AUT)	Elisa Winter (AUT)	
(Norway) Fara Criterium	1 May 2023	1.NE	Vibeke Lystad (NOR)	Karianne Kanebog (NOR)	Åshild Tovsrud (NOR)	
(Belgium) GP de la l'Adminuistration Communale	1 May 2023	1.NE	Gloria Van Mechelen (BEL)	Ellen McDermott (IRL)	Femke van Goethem (BEL)	
(Sweden) Ringenloppet	1 May 2023	1.NE	Matilda Frantzich (SWE)	Erika Ingves (FIN)	Ella Wahlström (SWE)	
(Italy) Trofeo Rosa Green Bike	1 May 2023	1.NE	Federica Venturelli (ITA)	Marta Pavesi (ITA)	Elisa Tottolo (ITA)	
(Germany) Großer Preis der Sparkasse Neuss	1 May 2023	1.NE	Mieke Kröger (GER)	Marlene Cleves (GER)	Elisa Sassmann (GER)	
(Germany) Finsterwalder Cityrennen	1 May 2023	1.NE	Olivia Schoppe (GER)	Judith Krahl (GER)	Tessa Zwaenepoel (BEL)	
(Switzerland) Rund um den Weiherring	1 May 2023	1.NE	Linda Indergand (SUI)	Lea Fuchs (SUI)	Nicole Suter (SUI)	
(Estonia) Kalevi MV Kriteeriumis	1 May 2023	1.NE	Kristin Jõgi (EST)	Carol Kuuskman (EST)	Annabrit Prants (EST)	
(Switzerland) Dienstagabendrennen Möhlin	2 May 2023	1.NE	Laurin Bachmann (SUI)			
(Estonia) Rahinge TT 2	3 May 2023	1.NE	Hanna Karoline Taaramäe (EST)	Anette Zukker (EST)	Triin Kull (EST)	
(Sweden) Arlanda Reverse GP	3 May 2023	1.NE	Ella Holmegård (SWE)	Cecilia Broms-Thell (SWE)	Therese Ljungström (SWE)	
(United States) Sunny King Criterium	6 May 2023	1.NE	Lizbeth Salazar (MEX)	Kendall Ryan (USA)	Sarah Van Dam (CAN)	
(Germany) Rheinland-Pfalz Championship ITT	6 May 2023	1.NE	Mareike Spindler (GER)	Janina Morin Bender (GER)	Luciana Giaretta Menezes (GER)	
(Germany) Mecklenburg-Vorpommern Championship ITT	6 May 2023	1.NE	Eike Liefke (GER)			
(Germany) Schleswig-Holstein Championship ITT	6 May 2023	1.NE	Jorid Behn (GER)	Cordula Biermann (GER)	Nina Heike (GER)	
(Germany) Sachsen-Anhalt Championship ITT	6 May 2023	1.NE	Adelheid Schütz (GER)	Olivia Schoppe (GER)	Nele Hüttig (GER)	
(Germany) Berlin Championship ITT	6 May 2023	1.NE	Paula Thieme (GER)	Aline Barre (GER)	Sam Sandten (GER)	
(Germany) Saarland Championship ITT	6 May 2023	1.NE	Franziska Jablonski (GER)			
(Germany) Bremen Championship ITT	6 May 2023	1.NE	Marie Lagershausen (GER)			
(Estonia) Filter Maanteekarikasari Viljandis 1	6 May 2023	1.NE	Kate MacLeod (GBR)	Annabrit Prants (EST)	Mari Kruuser (EST)	
(Italy) Coppa Ristorante Cibus	7 May 2023	1.NE	Vanessa Michieletto (ITA)	Valentina Basilico (ITA)	Carmela Cipriani (ITA)	
(Belgium) Ronde van Sinaai	7 May 2023	1.NE	Febe Poppe (BEL)	Lensy Debboudt (BEL)	Louise Jacquemin (BEL)	
(Netherlands) Wielerronde 't Zand NH	7 May 2023	1.NE	Carmen van der Veen (NED)	Maartje Redder (NED)	Sanne Bouwmeester (NED)	
(Netherlands) Wielerronde van Standdaarbuiten	7 May 2023	1.NE	Elisa Serné (NED)	Tiffany Keep (RSA)	Jennifer van der Voort (NED)	
(Germany) Bremen Championship RR	7 May 2023	1.NE	Marie Lagershausen (GER)	Lara-Sophie Martin (GER)		
(Germany) Hamburg Championship RR	7 May 2023	1.NE	Lea Lützen (GER)	Silke Keil (GER)	Anne-Josephe Bertram (GER)	
(Germany) Sachsen Championship RR	7 May 2023	1.NE	Olivia Schoppe (GER)	Nora Schulz (GER)		
(Germany) Hessen Championship RR	7 May 2023	1.NE	Tabea Carlotta Latocha (GER)	Maria Woll (GER)	Kristin-Elisabeth Kroth (GER)	
(Germany) Berlin Championship RR	7 May 2023	1.NE	Anna Scheffler (GER)	Aline Barre (GER)	Paula Thieme (GER)	
(Germany) Nordrhein-Westfalen Championship RR	7 May 2023	1.NE	Marlene Cleves (GER)	Nele Laing (GER)	Mira Winkelhag (GER)	
(Germany) Brandenburg Championship RR	7 May 2023	1.NE	Selma Lantzsch (GER)	Anja Schalinski (GER)	Sam Sandten (GER)	
(Germany) Baden-Württemberg Championship RR	7 May 2023	1.NE	Janine Schneider (GER)	Amelie Zimmermann (GER)	Isabel Kämpfert (GER)	
(Germany) Niedersachsen Championship RR	7 May 2023	1.NE	Katharina Julia Hinz (GER)	Bianca Bernhard (GER)	Diana Westerheide (GER)	
(Germany) Thüringen Championship RR	7 May 2023	1.NE	Lara Röhricht (GER)	Lena Charlotte Reißner (GER)	Miriam Zeise (GER)	
(Germany) Mecklenburg-Vorpommern Championship RR	7 May 2023	1.NE	Eike Liefke (GER)			
(Germany) Schleswig-Holstein Championship RR	7 May 2023	1.NE	Jorid Behn (GER)	Amelie Mies (GER)	Philine Letz (GER)	
(Estonia) Taliinna MV Kriteeriumis	7 May 2023	1.NE	Kristel Sandra Soonik (EST)	Laura Lizette Sander (EST)	Silvia Türkson (EST)	
(Sweden) Giro de La Fiskartorpia GP	9 May 2023	1.NE	Hanna Johansson (SWE)	Maja Johansson (SWE)	Liv Eriksson (SWE)	
(Netherlands) DK Midden ITT	9 May 2023	1.NE	Lisanne Immerzeel (NED)	Anna van der Meiden (NED)	Petra Welmers (NED)	
(Netherlands) Tijdrit#1 KNWU Noord	10 May 2023	1.NE	Anneke Dijkstra (NED)	Maike van der Duin (NED)	Iris Schultinga (NED)	
(Germany) Donnerstagsrennen #1	11 May 2023	1.NE	Laura Kastenhuber (GER)	Lilly Walter (GER)	Franziska Pauer (GER)	
(Belgium) Ladies Cycling Trophy #8	12 May 2023	1.NE	Chloe Moran (AUS)	Maud Kaptheijns (NED)	Lensy Debboudt (BEL)	
(Switzerland) Berner Rundfahrt	13 May 2023	1.NE	Lea Fuchs (SUI)	Fernanda Yapura (ARG)	Aline Seitz (SUI)	
(Netherlands) Draai Rond De Kraal	13 May 2023	1.NE	Tessa Dijksman (NED)	Dèvon Kuijstermans (NED)	Yvet Schoonewille (NED)	
(Sweden) Giro Himledalen Tempo	13 May 2023	1.NE	Ebba Granqvist (SWE)	Bianca Christiansen (DEN)	Ella Wahlström (SWE)	
(Belgium) Ladies Cycling Trophy #9	13 May 2023	1.NE	Chloe Moran (AUS)	Thalita de Jong (NED)	Jesse Vandenbulcke (BEL)	
(Denmark) MCC Kvickly løbet	13 May 2023	1.NE	Johanna Clausen Koerner (DEN)	Marie-Louise Hartz Krogager (DEN)	Sofie Carstensen (DEN)	
(Burkina Faso) Tour de Dafra	13 May 2023	1.NE	Lamoussa Zoungrana (BUR)	Awa Bamogo (BUR)	Lydie Congo (BUR)	
(Czech Republic) Brilon Cup #3	14 May 2023	1.NE	Eliška Kvasničková (CZE)	Kristýna Zemanová (CZE)	Barbora Němcová (CZE)	
(France) CLM Champenois	14 May 2023	1.NE	(France) Occitane Cyclisme Formation OCF	(France) Sprinteur Club Féminin	Team Féminin Hauts-de-France	
(Sweden) Giro Himledalen Linje	14 May 2023	1.NE	Matilda Frantzich (SWE)	Sofie Rosencrantz (SWE)	Martina Nilsson (SWE)	
(Switzerland) Primeo Energie - ASOC-Cup VI	14 May 2023	1.NE	Lea Fuchs (SUI)	Lorena Leu (SUI)	Fabienne Buri (SUI)	
(Belgium) Women Cycling Series #3	14 May 2023	1.NE	Febe Poppe (BEL)	Elisa Serné (NED)	Marieke Meert (BEL)	
(United Kingdom) British Cycling Women's National Road series #2	14 May 2023	1.NE	Robyn Clay (GBR)	Charlotte Hodgkins-Byrne (GBR)	Sammie Stuart (GBR)	
(Finland) Rosendahl GP	14 May 2023	1.NE	Hanna Joronen (FIN)	Kaarina Nurminen (FIN)	Emilia Holmila (FIN)	
(Denmark) Stark-Løbet	14 May 2023	1.NE	Julie Nielsen Maribo (DEN)	Caroline Kirk Schad (DEN)	Marie-Louise Hartz Krogager (DEN)	
(Netherlands) Wielerronde van Amstelveen	14 May 2023	1.NE	Paulien Koster (NED)	Lisanne Immerzeel (NED)	Hanneke Mulder (NED)	
(Sweden) Hökensås Runt	14 May 2023	1.NE	Åsa Rott (SWE)	Erica Zetterlund (SWE)	Lisa Brandin (SWE)	
(Denmark) Grejsdalsløbet	14 May 2023	1.NE	Aleksandra Jensen (DEN)	Line Wasehus Ibsen (DEN)	Gitte Lyndrup (DEN)	
(Germany) Das Dormagener Radrennen	14 May 2023	1.NE	Anna Zöll (GER)	Lydia Ventker (GER)	Sina Maaßen (GER)	
(Germany) Rund um Keltern	14 May 2023	1.NE	Daniela Gass (GER)	Pia Kummer (GER)	Sandra Geyer (GER)	
(Netherlands) Merida NL Gravel Series #1	14 May 2023	1.NE	Mariëlle Trouwborst (NED)	Emma Boogaard (NED)	Manon Bakker (NED)	
(Switzerland) Bergrennen Silenen-Amsteg-Bristen	18 May 2023	1.NE	Linda Indergand (SUI)	Nicole Suter (SUI)	Lara Krähemann (SUI)	
(Denmark) Frederiksberg EL løbet	18 May 2023	1.NE	Maja Heisel (DEN)	Anne Holm (DEN)	Kathrine Olivia Madsen (DEN)	
(France) Grand Prix d'Aix-en-Othe Féminin	18 May 2023	1.NE	Marion Bunel (FRA)	Océane Mahé (FRA)	Laury Milette (CAN)	
(Netherlands) Women Cycling Series #4	18 May 2023	1.NE	Julie Stockman (BEL)	Carmen van der Veen (NED)	Jennifer van der Voort (NED)	
(Netherlands) Ronde van Lekkerkerk	18 May 2023	1.NE	Irene Schouten (NED)	Quinty Ton (NED)	Loes Adegeest (NED)	
(Belgium) Ladies Cycling Trophy #10	18 May 2023	1.NE	Robyn Clay (GBR)	Jo Tindley (GBR)	Keely Bennett (AUS)	
(Belgium) Belgian Derny Championship	18 May 2023	1.NE	Sanne Cant (BEL)	Kim de Baat (BEL)	Marion Norbert-Riberolle (BEL)	
(Germany) Radrennen Kriterium in Holzhausen	18 May 2023	1.NE	Daniela Gass (GER)	Nadja Moster (GER)	Antje Thamm (GER)	
(Germany) INTERSTUHL CUP Albstadt Tailfingen	18 May 2023	1.NE	Valeria Rechenauer (GER)	Claudia Marek (GER)	Sophia Dunz (GER)	
(Germany) Großer Preis von Buchholz	18 May 2023	1.NE	Bianca Bernhard (GER)	Lea Lützen (GER)	Katharina Julia Hinz (GER)	
(Germany) Preis der Brauerei Hacklberg	18 May 2023	1.NE	Luisa Beck (GER)	Laura Kastenhuber (GER)	Lena Gömmel (GER)	
(Belgium) Women Cycling Series #5	19 May 2023	1.NE	Dina Scavone (BEL)	Ida Krum (DEN)	Julie Stockman (BEL)	
(Germany) 7hills bike night	19 May 2023	1.NE	Lydia Ventker (GER)	Kerstin Brachtendorf (GER)	Carmen Burmeister (GER)	
(Spain) GP Ajuntament de Picassent	20 May 2023	1.NE	Ángela Fernández (ESP)	Violeta Hernández (ESP)	Fernanda Tapia (CHI)	
(Germany) Großer Preis der ITK-Engineering	20 May 2023	1.NE	Daniela Gass (GER)	Nadja Moster (GER)	Mareike Spindler (GER)	
(Germany) elektroland24 S-Cup	20 May 2023	1.NE	Finja Siegmund (GER)	Philine Letz (GER)	Nina Heike (GER)	
(Estonia) Elva Tänavasõit	20 May 2023	1.NE	Kristel Sandra Soonik (EST)	Liisa Ehrberg (EST)	Laura Lizette Sander (EST)	
(United Kingdom) Banbury Star	21 May 2023	1.NE	Emily Proud (GBR)	Lucy Lee (GBR)	Zoë Langham (GBR)	
(United Kingdom) BUCS Road Race Championships	21 May 2023	1.NE	Francesca Hall (GBR)	Amelia Tyler (GBR)	Lauren Robinson (GBR)	
(Denmark) CK Nordsjælland løb	21 May 2023	1.NE	Marie-Louise Hartz Krogager (DEN)	Mie Nordlund Pedersen (DEN)	Marita Jensen (DEN)	
(Denmark) Fredericia Cycle Club	21 May 2023	1.NE	Mia Sofie Rützou (DEN)	Johanna Clausen Koerner (DEN)	Julie Abrahamsen (DEN)	
(Germany) INTERSTUHL CUP Heilbronn	21 May 2023	1.NE	Claudia Marek (GER)	Marina Knoll (GER)	Lisa Lorenz (GER)	
(Estonia) Elva Rattapäev	21 May 2023	1.NE	Ann-Christine Allik (EST)			
(Switzerland) Women's Night Crit #1	24 May 2023	1.NE	Nofar Maoz (ISR)	Aline Seitz (SUI)	Ori Bash Dubinski (ISR)	
(Switzerland) Brugger Abendrennen I	24 May 2023	1.NE	Cybèle Schneider (SUI)	Cathia Schär (SUI)	Marilena Kuster (SUI)	
(Estonia) Filter Temposari Viimsis	24 May 2023	1.NE	Laura Lizette Sander (EST)	Elisabeth Ebras (EST)	Aidi Gerde Tuisk (EST)	
(Belgium) Ladies Cycling Trophy #11	27 May 2023	1.NE	Marga López (ESP)	Nikki Souren (NED)	Femke van Goethem (BEL)	
(Switzerland) Nat. Pfingstrennen Ehrendingen	29 May 2023	1.NE	Vera Looser (NAM)	Elena Hartmann (SUI)	Lara Krähemann (SUI)	
(Switzerland) Brugger Abendrennen II	31 May 2023	1.NE	Noëlle Rüetschi (SUI)			
(Estonia) Kavastu TT	31 May 2023	1.NE	Hanna Karoline Taaramäe (EST)	Triin Kull (EST)	Eike Sild-Neeme (EST)	
(Belgium) Ladies Cycling Trophy #12	2 June 2023	1.NE	Keely Bennett (AUS)	Sandrine Tas (BEL)	Gloria Van Mechelen (BEL)	
(Denmark) Nakskov CC	3 June 2023	1.NE	Julie Nielsen Maribo (DEN)	Marie-Louise Hartz Krogager (DEN)	Marita Jensen (DEN)	
(Denmark) Grand Prix Sandbjerg	4 June 2023	1.NE	Maja Winther Brandt (DEN)	Amalie Kvist Nybroe (DEN)	Julie Nielsen Maribo (DEN)	
(Latvia) Ķekava Bike Rice	4 June 2023	1.NE	Diāna Jurēviča (LVA)	Una Timermane (LVA)	Karīna Rokjāne (LVA)	
(Switzerland) Primeo Energie - ASOC-Cup VII	4 June 2023	1.NE	Janine Schneider (GER)	Melanie Maurer (SUI)	Anneleen Bosma (NED)	
(Switzerland) Brugger Abendrennen III	7 June 2023	1.NE	Cybèle Schneider (SUI)	Annika Liehner (SUI)	Ariella Käslin (SUI)	
(Switzerland) Women's Night Crit #2	7 June 2023	1.NE	Léna Mettraux (SUI)	Léa Stern (SUI)	Marlène Morel-Petitgirard (FRA)	
(Estonia) Filter Temposari Ääsmäe	7 June 2023	1.NE	Dana Rožlapa (LVA)	Ann-Christine Allik (EST)	Laura Lizette Sander (EST)	
(Belgium) Grote Prijs Immo Yves	8 June 2023	1.NE	Georgia Baker (AUS)	Haylee Fuller (AUS)	Jessica Allen (AUS)	
(Belgium) Ladies Cycling Trophy #13	10 June 2023	1.NE	Jo Tindley (GBR)	Lensy Debboudt (BEL)	Emma Duchateau (BEL)	
(Netherlands) Merida NL Gravel Series #2	10 June 2023	1.NE	Manon Bakker (NED)	Mariëlle Trouwborst (NED)	Joyce Vanderbeken (BEL)	
(Denmark) Vejle Løbet	11 June 2023	1.NE	Mia Sofie Rützou (DEN)	Trine Holmsgaard (DEN)	Johanna Clausen Koerner (DEN)	
(Denmark) Ordrup CC Linjeløb	11 June 2023	1.NE	Kathrine Olivia Madsen (DEN)	Caroline Kirk Schad (DEN)	Julie Nielsen Maribo (DEN)	
(Czech Republic) Brilon Cup #4	11 June 2023	1.NE	Kateřina Hladíková (CZE)	Kristýna Zemanová (CZE)	Tereza Tvarůžková (CZE)	
4ª Taça de Portugal Feminina	11 June 2023	1.NE	Cristiana Valente (POR)	Ana Caramelo (POR)	Augustina Perdomo (URU)	
(Belgium) GP Slagerij Gunther & Wendy	13 June 2023	1.NE	Lara Gillespie (IRL)	Julie De Wilde (BEL)	Rachael Wales (AUS)	
(Switzerland) Brugger Abendrennen IV	14 June 2023	1.NE	Noëlle Rüetschi (SUI)	Lea Huber (SUI)	Annika Liehner (SUI)	
(Estonia) Filter Temposari Padise	14 June 2023	1.NE	Aidi Gerde Tuisk (EST)	Liisa Kull (EST)	Ann-Christine Allik (EST)	
(Latvia) ITT LRF Cup	14 June 2023	1.NE	Dana Rožlapa (LVA)	Madara Āboma (LVA)	Lāsma Elza Vaivode (LVA)	
(Belgium) Ladies Cycling Trophy #14	16 June 2023	1.NE	Romy Kasper (GER)	Hanna Theys (BEL)	Aniek van Alphen (NED)	
(Belgium) Ladies Cycling Trophy #15	17 June 2023	1.NE	Ally Wollaston (NZL)	Marthe Truyen (BEL)	Marthe Goossens (BEL)	
(Belgium) Ladies Cycling Trophy #16	18 June 2023	1.NE	Ally Wollaston (NZL)	Kelly Druyts (BEL)	Cecilia van Zuthem (NED)	
(Denmark) Din Bilpartner løbet	18 June 2023	1.NE	Maja Winther Brandt (DEN)	Mia Sofie Rützou (DEN)	Marita Jensen (DEN)	
(Switzerland) Tour du Canton de Fribourg III	18 June 2023	1.NE	Siham Es Sad (MAR)	Sylvie Aeby Convert (SUI)		
(Estonia) Sangaste Valgete Teede Rattaralli	18 June 2023	1.NE	Mairis Õispuu (EST)			
(Switzerland) Brugger Abendrennen V	21 June 2023	1.NE	Lea Huber (SUI)	Laila Lüthi (SUI)		
(Switzerland) Women's Night Crit #3	28 June 2023	1.NE	Marlène Morel-Petitgirard (FRA)	Siham Es Sad (MAR)	Elia Marthe (SUI)	
(Belgium) Grote Prijs Affligem	30 June 2023	1.NE	Marieke de Groot (NED)	Margot Vanpachtenbeke (BEL)	Anna van Wersch (NED)	
(Estonia) Epiim Rattapäev Järva-Jaanis	1 July 2023	1.NE	Janelle Uibokand (EST)	Birgit Tito (EST)	Hanna Karoline Taaramäe (EST)	
(Latvia) Latvian Gravel Championship	1 July 2023	1.NE	Lija Laizāne (LVA)	Dana Rožlapa (LVA)	Zane Priede (LVA)	
(Belgium) Ladies Cycling Trophy #17	2 July 2023	1.NE	Marieke Meert (BEL)	Amber Aernouts (BEL)	Henrietta Colborne (GBR)	
Gravel Grinder Estonia	2 July 2023	1.NE	Laura Lepasalu (EST)	Triin Rast (EST)	Karin Kriis (EST)	
(Belgium) Provinciaal Kampioenschap Oost-Vlaanderen	7 July 2023	1.NE	Thalita de Jong (NED)	Henrietta Colborne (GBR)	Minke Bakker (NED)	
(Belgium) Provinciaal Kampioenschap Oost-Vlaanderen U23	7 July 2023	1.NE	Nora Linton (CAN)	Alisha Wells (AUS)	Lotte Popelier (BEL)	
(Belgium) Women Cycling Series #6	8 July 2023	1.NE	Vera Tieleman (NED)	Dina Scavone (BEL)	Marit Cent (NED)	
(Switzerland) GP Olten	9 July 2023	1.NE	Marlen Reusser (SUI)	Elina Tasane (EST)	Luciana Roland (ARG)	
(Latvia) Vēvers kausa izcīņa	12 July 2023	1.NE	Gunita Barisa (LVA)	Olga Ballo (LVA)	Dace Bleidere (LVA)	
(Belgium) Ladies Cycling Trophy #18	14 July 2023	1.NE	Kelly Druyts (BEL)	Femke Beuling (NED)	Ebtissam Mohamed (EGY)	
(United Kingdom) British Cycling Women's National Road series #3	14 July 2023	1.NE	Ruth Shier (GBR)	Jessica Finney (GBR)	Lucy Lee (GBR)	
(Belgium) Profronde van Deurne	15 July 2023	1.NE	Emily Watts (AUS)	Natalie Quinn (USA)	Kelly Druyts (BEL)	
(Estonia) Lauri Ausi Mälestussõit	15 July 2023	1.NE	Kristel Sandra Soonik (EST)			
(Switzerland) GP La Fabrique	16 July 2023	1.NE	Fariba Hashimi (AFG)	Nofar Moaz (ISR)	Yulduz Hashimi (AFG)	
(Switzerland) Martigny-Mauvoisin	16 July 2023	1.NE	Petra Stiasny (SUI)	Annabel Fisher (GBR)	Natalia Franco (COL)	
(Belgium) Ladies Cycling Trophy #19	18 July 2023	1.NE	Olha Kulynych (UKR)	Marieke Meert (BEL)	Lotte Popelier (BEL)	
(Belgium) Provinciaal Kampioenschap Vlaams-Brabant	18 July 2023	1.NE	Kim Knaeps (BEL)	Eleanor Wiseman (BEL)	Marie Huvenne (BEL)	
(Belgium) Ladies Cycling Trophy #20	19 July 2023	1.NE	Saartje Vandenbroucke (BEL)	Minke Bakker (NED)	Anne-Sophie Dooms (BEL)	
(Belgium) SD Worx BW Women Race	19 July 2023	1.NE	Kelly Druyts (BEL)	Emily Watts (AUS)	Marieke Meert (BEL)	
(Switzerland) Brugger Abendrennen VII	19 July 2023	1.NE	Livia Wespe (SUI)			
(Belgium) Schaal Marcel Indekeu	21 July 2023	1.NE	Marieke Meert (BEL)	Felicity Wilson-Haffenden (AUS)	Natalie Quinn (USA)	
(Belgium) Ladies Cycling Trophy #21	22 July 2023	1.NE	Olha Kulynych (UKR)	Audrey De Keersmaeker (BEL)	Cécile Lejeune (FRA)	
(Belgium) Borlo TT	23 July 2023	1.NE	Julie Sap (BEL)	Esmée Gielkens (BEL)	Saartje Vandenbroucke (BEL)	
(Belgium) Kriterium Boezinge	24 July 2023	1.NE	Keira Will (AUS)	Kate Seiler (USA)	Paquita Derie (BEL)	
(Switzerland) Brugger Abendrennen VIII	26 July 2023	1.NE	Sophie Anderhub (SUI)			
(Belgium) Clima & Partners Criterium	27 July 2023	1.NE	Monica Greenwood (GBR)	Fien van Eynde (BEL)	Laura Verdonschot (BEL)	
(Belgium) Ladies Cycling Trophy #22	28 July 2023	1.NE	Lotte Popelier (BEL)	Natalie Quinn (USA)	Emilia Fahlin (SWE)	
(Belgium) GP Kasimir Berdysz	28 July 2023	1.NE	Marieke Meert (BEL)	Quinty van de Guchte (NED)	Louise Jacquemin (BEL)	
(Belgium) Ladies Cycling Trophy #23	30 July 2023	1.NE	Millie Couzens (GBR)	Monica Greenwood (GBR)	Kate Seiler (USA)	
(Belgium) Kapelse Sprint	1 August 2023	1.NE	Millie Couzens (GBR)	Marith Vanhove (BEL)	Kelly Druyts (BEL)	
(Switzerland) Championnat Suisse de la Montagne	1 August 2023	1.NE	Nicole Suter (SUI)	Chrystelle Baumann (SUI)	Alia Pfiffner (SUI)	
(Latvia) Riga Grand Prix	2 August 2023	1.NE	Akvilė Gedraitytė (LTU)	Madara Āboma (LVA)	Linda Eihmane (LVA)	
(Switzerland) Brugger Abendrennen IX	2 August 2023	1.NE	Michelle Stark (SUI)			
(Estonia) Vorbuste TT	2 August 2023	1.NE	Hanna Karoline Taaramäe (EST)	Triin Kull (EST)	Birgit Tito (EST)	
(Germany) Großer Preis von Mehlingen	5 August 2023	1.NE	Daniela Gass (GER)	Amelie Joelle Messemer (GER)	Mareike Spindler (GER)	
(Germany) Gartenstadt-Kriterium Bamberg	5 August 2023	1.NE	Isabella Hornig (GER)	Anja Bertleff (GER)	Finja Siegmund (GER)	
(Belgium) Denderbelle Criterium	6 August 2023	1.NE	Sterre Vervloet (BEL)	Henrietta Colborne (GBR)	Marga López (ESP)	
(Germany) Großer Preis der Stadt Troisdorf	6 August 2023	1.NE	Lydia Ventker (GER)	Mira Winkelhag (GER)	Nele Laing (GER)	
(Switzerland) GP Oberbaselbiet	6 August 2023	1.NE	Fernanda Yapura (ARG)	Solbjørk Minke (DEN)	Noëlle Rüetschi (SUI)	
(Belgium) Ladies Cycling Trophy #24	8 August 2023	1.NE	Aoife O'Brien (IRL)	Alana Castrique (BEL)	Yenthe van Lommel (BEL)	
(Switzerland) Brugger Abendrennen X	9 August 2023	1.NE	Cybèle Schneider (SUI)			
(Belgium) Ladies Cycling Trophy #25	12 August 2023	1.NE	Zoe Bäckstedt (GBR)	Grace Lister (GBR)	Elise Marie Olsen (NOR)	
(Germany) 88 mal rund um die Marktallee	12 August 2023	1.NE	Lara Röhricht (GER)	Lydia Ventker (GER)	Marla Sigmund (GER)	
(Denmark) Hillerød CC Grand Prix	13 August 2023	1.NE	Julie Nielsen Maribo (DEN)	Marie-Louise Hartz Krogager (DEN)	Amalie Kvist Nybroe (DEN)	
(Denmark) Hobro Løbet	13 August 2023	1.NE	Mia Sofie Rützou (DEN)	Louise Norman Hansen (DEN)	Maria Lysdal (DEN)	
(Germany) Kriterium Rund in der Alten Messe Leipzig	13 August 2023	1.NE	Olivia Schoppe (GER)	Tina Rücker (GER)	Nele Reis (GER)	
(Germany) elektroland24 S-Cup #5	13 August 2023	1.NE	Jorid Behn (GER)	Sandrine Weber (GER)	Cordula Biermann (GER)	
(Germany) Bergzeitfahren Ebersburg-Weyhers mit LV-Meisterschaft Berg	13 August 2023	1.NE	Lisa Strothmann (GER)	Anja Bertleff (GER)	Dana Wagner (GER)	
(Germany) Großer Silberpilspreis	13 August 2023	1.NE	Franziska Brauße (GER)	Daniela Gass (GER)	Katharina Fox (GER)	
(Germany) Rund um die KÖ	13 August 2023	1.NE	Marla Sigmund (GER)	Mira Winkelhag (GER)	Sarah Kustos (GER)	
(Belgium) Dernycriterium Wilrijk	14 August 2023	1.NE	Annemiek van Vleuten (NED)	Marianne Vos (NED)	Ceylin del Carmen Alvarado (NED)	
(Netherlands) Nover Wielerspektakel	15 August 2023	1.NE	(Netherlands) Movistar Team; Floortje Mackaij; Annemiek van Vleuten	(Netherlands) Visma–Lease a Bike; Amber Kraak; Riejanne Markus	(Netherlands) Visma–Lease a Bike 2 Eva van Agt; Nienke Veenhoven	
(Germany) Dachauer Bergkriterium	15 August 2023	1.NE	Pia Kummer (GER)	Lena Gömmel (GER)	Sabrina Zwick (GER)	
(Belgium) Ronde van Brasschaat	15 August 2023	1.NE	Nina Kessler (NED)	Grace Lister (GBR)	Nora Tveit (NOR)	
(Switzerland) Brugger Abendrennen XI	16 August 2023	1.NE	Cybèle Schneider (SUI)	Livia Steinmann (SUI)	Janine Schneider (GER)	
(Estonia) Tõravere TT	16 August 2023	1.NE	Hanna Karoline Taaramäe (EST)	Anette Zukker (EST)	Birgit Tito (EST)	
(Belgium) Ladies Cycling Trophy #26	18 August 2023	1.NE	Nina Kessler (NED)	Nora Tveit (NOR)	Emma Jeffers (GBR)	
(France) Boucles de l'Oise féminines	18 August 2023	1.NE	Emeline Courtot (FRA)	Justine Gegu (FRA)	Constance Marchand (FRA)	
(Norway) NorgesCup Glåmdal	18 August 2023	1.NE	Ane Iversen (NOR)	Sigrid Haugset (NOR)	Elise Marie Olsen (NOR)	
(Germany) BSR Radsport-Tag	19 August 2023	1.NE	Lydia Ventker (GER)	Mira Winkelhag (GER)	Sarah Kustos (GER)	
(Netherlands) Wielerronde van Dirksland	19 August 2023	1.NE	Nina Kessler (NED)	Riejanne Markus (NED)	Pauliena Rooijakkers (NED)	
(Norway) NorgesCup Glåmdal	19 August 2023	1.NE	Sigrid Haugset (NOR)	Elise Marie Olsen (NOR)	Tiril Jørgensen (NOR)	
(Belgium) Derny Criterium 's-Gravenwezel	20 August 2023	1.NE	Alyssa Polites (AUS)	Kerry Jonker (RSA)	Nina Kessler (NED)	
(Belgium) Grote Prijs Cafe T Kliekske	20 August 2023	1.NE	Marieke Meert (BEL)	Paquita Derie (BEL)	Anja Nobus (BEL)	
(Denmark) Bjerg Grand Prix	20 August 2023	1.NE	Mia Sofie Rützou (DEN)	Mikka Holm (DEN)	Maria Lysdal (DEN)	
(Finland) Porvoon Ajot	20 August 2023	1.NE	Hanna Joronen (FIN)	Maija Pentsinen (FIN)	Essi Pelto-Arvo (FIN)	
(Germany) Großer Preis Zentrale Autoglas	20 August 2023	1.NE	Katharina Hinz (GER)	Sina Maaßen (GER)	Finja Siegmund (GER)	
(United Kingdom) British Cycling Women's National Road series #4	20 August 2023	1.NE	Millie Couzens (GBR)	Tiffany Keep (RSA)	Mary Wilkinson (GBR)	
(Italy) Giornata Rosa - Memorial Chiara Pierobon	20 August 2023	1.NE	Giorgia Bariani (ITA)	Irene Affolati (ITA)	Alice Palazzi (ITA)	
(Netherlands) Profwielerronde Etten-Leur	20 August 2023	1.NE	Demi Vollering (NED)	Lorena Wiebes (NED)	Fem van Empel (NED)	
(Netherlands) Ronde van Heerhugowaard	20 August 2023	1.NE	Rose Kloese (NED)	Marit Cent (NED)	Demi de Jong (NED)	
(Norway) NorgesCup Glåmdal	20 August 2023	1.NE	Ane Iversen (NOR)	Elise Marie Olsen (NOR)	Vibeke Lystad (NOR)	
(Switzerland) Prix du Bois-des-Lattes	20 August 2023	1.NE	Yelyzaveta Holod (UKR)	Nofar Maoz (ISR)	Ori Bash Dubinski (ISR)	
(United States) National Cycling League Atlanta	20 August 2023	1.NE	(United States) Fount Cycling Guild	(United States) CCB p/b LLG	(United States) Miami Nights	
(Belgium) Ladies Cycling Trophy #27	21 August 2023	1.NE	Julie Hendrickx (BEL)	Babette van der Wolf (NED)	Mijntje Geurts (NED)	
(Denmark) Tour de Charlottenlund	21 August 2023	1.NE	Melanie Brunhofer (AUT)	Amalie Kvist (DEN)	Mie Nordlund Pedersen (DEN)	
(Switzerland) Tour du Canton de Fribourg IV	23 August 2023	1.NE	Nguyễn Thị Thật (VIE)	Fariba Hashimi (AFG)	Léa Stern (SUI)	
(Belgium) GP Lucien Van Impe	24 August 2023	1.NE	Katrijn De Clercq (BEL)	Anna van Wersch (NED)	Caoimhe O'Brien (IRL)	
(Belgium) Aarschotse Criterium	24 August 2023	1.NE	Monica Greenwood (GBR)	Jo Tindley (GBR)	Isabel Darvill (GBR)	
(Netherlands) Ronde van Borne	24 August 2023	1.NE	Rixt Hoogland (NED)	Florien Bolks (NED)	Paulien Koster (NED)	
(Austria) Int. Braunauer Radsporttage Kriterium	26 August 2023	1.NE	Petra Zsankó (HUN)	Melanie Brunhofer (AUT)	Jana Gigele (AUT)	
(Denmark) Grand Prix Lumsås	26 August 2023	1.NE	Mikka Holm (DEN)	Louise Vig Clausen (DEN)		
(Finland) Helsinki Velotour	26 August 2023	1.NE	Heidi Antikainen (FIN)	Hanna Joronen (FIN)	Anniina Hakkarainen (FIN)	
(Netherlands) ProMobility Ladies Cycling Circuit #6	26 August 2023	1.NE	Diane Snobelen (CAN)	Helena Gierveld (NED)	Oliwia Majewska (POL)	
(Norway) Birkebeinerrittet	26 August 2023	1.NE	Marte Edseth (NOR)	Oda Laforce (NOR)	Ingrid Lorvik (NOR)	
(Belgium) Ladies Cycling Trophy #28	27 August 2023	1.NE	Rotem Gafinovitz (ISR)	Quinty van de Guchte (NED)	Nora Tveit (NOR)	
(Belgium) Schaal Sels	27 August 2023	1.NE	Lotte Kopecky (BEL)	Jo Tindley (GBR)	Tiffany Keep (RSA)	
(France) GP Nantes Essor Loire Atlantique	27 August 2023	1.NE	Charlotte Allard (FRA)	Marine Maugé (FRA)	Pauline Bergé (FRA)	
(Latvia) Ilūkstes Velomaratons	27 August 2023	1.NE	Renāte Rodionova (LVA)	Vija Frīda (LVA)	Līva Bleive (LVA)	
(Netherlands) Omloop van de Bollenstreek	27 August 2023	1.NE	Nora Entius (NED)	Mirthe van der Beek (NED)	Tessa Sandberg (NED)	
(Switzerland) Radklassiker Chur-Arosa	27 August 2023	1.NE	Rahel Aschwanden (SUI)	Aglaia Forrer (GBR)	Nicole Suter (SUI)	
(Belgium) Women Cycling Series #7	28 August 2023	1.NE	Dina Scavone (BEL)	Paulien Koster (NED)	Sara Maes (BEL)	
(Switzerland) Tour du Canton de Fribourg V	30 August 2023	1.NE	Karolina Migoń (POL)	Dieuwertje Modder (NED)	Léa Stern (SUI)	
(Netherlands) Ronde van Leek	1 September 2023	1.NE	Lorena Wiebes (NED)	Femke Beuling (NED)	Meike Uiterwijk Winkel (NED)	
(Belgium) Ladies Cycling Trophy #29	2 September 2023	1.NE				
5ª Taça de Portugal Feminina	2 September 2023	1.NE	Vera Vilaça (POR)	Augustina Perdomo (URU)	Ana Caramelo (POR)	
(Czech Republic) Brilon Cup #5	3 September 2023	1.NE	Jarmila Machačová (CZE)	Barbora Němcová (CZE)	Nela Slaníková (CZE)	
(Sweden) Anundsloppet	3 September 2023	1.NE	Therese Fjordäng (SWE)	Ebba Granqvist (SWE)	Caroline Augustsson (SWE)	
(Switzerland) Primeo Energie - ASOC-Cup IX	3 September 2023	1.NE	Anna Kiesenhofer (AUT)	Lea Fuchs (SUI)	Léa Stern (SUI)	
(Belgium) Ladies Cycling Trophy #30	9 September 2023	1.NE	Saartje Vandenbroucke (BEL)	Rotem Gafinovitz (ISR)	Julie Stockman (BEL)	
(Netherlands) Merida NL Gravel Series #3	9 September 2023	1.NE	Fem van Empel (NED)	Pauliena Rooijakkers (NED)	Tessa Neefjes (NED)	
(Switzerland) Primeo Energie - ASOC-Cup X	9 September 2023	1.NE	Alina Myłka (POL)	Nicole Suter (SUI)	Noelle Ingold (SUI)	
(Czech Republic) Brilon Cup #6	10 September 2023	1.NE	Jarmila Machačová (CZE)	Denisa Slámová (CZE)	Barbora Němcová (CZE)	
(Argentina) Clásica de Venado Tuerto	17 September 2023	1.NE	Cristina Irma Greve (ARG)	Eliana Tocha (ARG)	Agustina Fernández (ARG)	
(Belgium) Ladies Cycling Trophy #31	17 September 2023	1.NE	Kato Heremans (BEL)	Femke van Goethem (BEL)	Daphné Acke (BEL)	
(Brazil) Volta do ABC Paulista	17 September 2023	1.NE	Wellyda Rodrigues (BRA)	Luciene Ferreira da Silva (BRA)	Thayná Araujo de Lima (BRA)	
(Germany) Neuenhagener Kriterium	17 September 2023	1.NE	Angelina Bosse (GER)	Zoe Dahmen (GER)	Francis Cerny (GER)	
(Germany) Radrennen rund in Kartung	17 September 2023	1.NE	Daniela Gass (GER)	Carolin Pratschker (GER)	Julia Anders (GER)	
(United Kingdom) British Cycling Women's National Road series #5	17 September 2023	1.NE	Corinne Side (GBR)	Emma Jeffers (GBR)	Sophie Smith (GBR)	
(Latvia) Toyota Rīgas velomaratons	17 September 2023	1.NE	Renāte Rodionova (LVA)	Daria Bilous (UKR)	Beāte Bula (LVA)	
(Namibia) Nedbank WPP4	17 September 2023	1.NE	CYMOT Ladies Team Orange; Monique du Plessis (NAM); Marissa Mouton (NAM); Nicola Fester (NAM); Jean-Marie Mostert (NAM); Binette Klein (NAM)	Cymot yellow ladies team Olivia Shililifa (NAM); Madison Mann (RSA); Susan Pieters (NAM)	Food Lovers Market Ladies; Hester Prins (NAM); Bertha Theron (NAM); Robyn-Lee Swartz (NAM)	
(Peru) Torneo CC Bicileo Trujillo V	17 September 2023	1.NE	Leidy Sánchez (PER)	Malú Reyes (PER)		
(Romania) Tour The Wall	17 September 2023	1.NE	Miriam Stan (ROU)	Suzanne Hilbert (ROU)	Cătălina Cătineanu (ROU)	
(Japan) Minamiuonuma Road Race	18 September 2023	1.NE	Yurina Kinoshita (JPN)	Hiromi Ohori (JPN)	Yoshiko Ishii (JPN)	
(Ghana) Osagyefo Criterium	21 September 2023	1.NE	Ese Okpeseraye (NGA)	Mary Samuel (NGA)	Treasure Coxson (NGA)	
(Germany) Riderman Einzelzeitfahren	22 September 2023	1.NE	Helena Bieber (GER)	Merle Brunnée (GER)	Lydia Ventker (GER)	
(Denmark) Hydro Løbet	23 September 2023	1.NE	Marita Jensen (DEN)	Mia Sofie Rützou (DEN)	Christina Bragh (DEN)	
(France) La Mirabelle Classic	23 September 2023	1.NE	Chloé Charpentier (FRA)	Lise Ménage (FRA)	Floraine Bernard (FRA)	
(France) La Mirabelle Classic N2	23 September 2023	1.NE	Constance Marchand (FRA)	Marion Cartier (FRA)	Nina Lavenu (FRA)	
(Germany) Riderman I	23 September 2023	1.NE	Lydia Ventker (GER)	Marla Sigmund (GER)	Olivia Schoppe (GER)	
(Germany) BERGKÖNIG #7	23 September 2023	1.NE	Lisa Strothmann (GER)	Anja Schneidenbach (GER)	Elke Weiß (GER)	
(Germany) Airport Race	23 September 2023	1.NE	Vanessa Laws (GER)			
(Italy) Trofeo dell’Uva	23 September 2023	1.NE	Beatrice Rossato (ITA)	Elisa Valtulini (ITA)	Debora Piana (ITA)	
(Japan) Gunma CSC Road Race September Tournament Day 1	23 September 2023	1.NE	Yoko Nakamura (JPN)	Wakana Takeda (JPN)	Hiromi Ohori (JPN)	
(Netherlands) Merida NL Gravel Series #4	23 September 2023	1.NE	Wendy Oosterwoud (NED)	Elisa Serné (NED)	Noa Jansen (NED)	
(Belgium) Women Cycling Series #8	24 September 2023	1.NE	Noa Jansen (NED)	Lisa van Belle (NED)	Febe Poppe (BEL)	
(Brazil) Prova Gov Dix-Sept Rosado	24 September 2023	1.NE	Aline Araújo Da Costa (BRA)	Maria Cecília Lagreca (BRA)	Brena Queiroz Magalhaes (BRA)	
(Czech Republic) GP Racio Břeclav	24 September 2023	1.NE	Sára Krochmaĺová (CZE)			
(Denmark) Fri Bike Shop - Sønderborg	24 September 2023	1.NE	Christina Bragh (DEN)	Marita Jensen (DEN)	Marie-Louise Hartz (DEN)	
(Dominican Republic) Clasico Augusto Sanchez	24 September 2023	1.NE	Flor Espiritusanto (DOM)			
(Germany) Riderman II	24 September 2023	1.NE	Katharina Fox (GER)	Helena Bieber (GER)	Nicole Suter (SUI)	
(Germany) Großer Herbstpreis der RSG Hannover	24 September 2023	1.NE	Sina Maaßen (GER)	Luisa Schmitt-Rodermund (GER)	Johanna Rasche (GER)	
(Germany) Märchensee Kriterium	24 September 2023	1.NE	Marina Knoll (GER)	Claudia Marek (GER)	Sophia Dunz (GER)	
(Guyana) Victor Macedo Memorial	24 September 2023	1.NE	Clevicia Spencer (GUY)	Abigail Jeffrey (GUY)		
Hong Kong Criterium Series #3	24 September 2023	1.NE	Lam Kong (HKG)	Kit Yee Leung (HKG)	June Huang (HKG)	
(Hungary) Pilis Kupa	24 September 2023	1.NE	Anna Aszalós (HUN)	Bettina Tímea Németh (HUN)		
(Japan) Gunma CSC Road Race September Tournament Day 2	24 September 2023	1.NE	Yoko Nakamura (JPN)	Wakana Takeda (JPN)	Kanade Ozeki (JPN)	
(Namibia) WPP5 Western Bypass	24 September 2023	1.NE	Anri Krugel (NAM)	Melissa Hinz (NAM)	Monique Du Plessis (NAM)	
(Norway) Fanahytten Opp	24 September 2023	1.NE	Stine Dale (NOR)	Kristin Eidsheim Sønnesyn (NOR)	Brena Queiroz Magalhaes (BRA)	
(Poland) Orlen Cup of Wileńska Road Cycling	24 September 2023	1.NE	Dominika Włodarczyk (POL)	Zuzanna Chylińska (POL)	Wiktoria Pikulik (POL)	
(Switzerland) Tour du Canton de Fribourg VI	24 September 2023	1.NE	Kateryna Velychko (UKR)	Josefina Holze (GER)	Julia Moser (SUI)	
(Belgium) Ladies Cycling Trophy #32	30 September 2023	1.NE	Minke Bakker (NED)	Jade Linthoudt (BEL)	Malou Van Hooste (BEL)	
(Germany) Radrennen Leipzig - Alte Messe	30 September 2023	1.NE	Olivia Schoppe (GER)	Elisabeth Kolbe (GER)	Selina Knaul (GER)	
(United Kingdom) Scottish National Women's Road Race Championships	30 September 2023	1.NE	Eilidh Shaw (GBR)	Heather Shanks (GBR)	Millie Thomson (GBR)	
(Japan) Shinshu Nagawa Time Trial	30 September 2023	1.NE	Hiroko Hirose (JPN)	Keiko Sugiura (JPN)	Ayana Okamoto (JPN)	
(North Macedonia) Trofej Skopje	30 September 2023	1.NE	Elena Petrova (MKD)	Adriana Anastasoska (MKD)		
(Netherlands) Kermis Wielerronde van Assendelft	30 September 2023	1.NE	Maike van der Duin (NED)	Ilse Pluimers (NED)	Nina Kessler (NED)	
(Peru) Airethon Primaveral	30 September 2023	1.NE	Leidy Sánchez (PER)	Manuelita Villar (PER)	Malú Reyes (PER)	
(Poland) National Championship Duo TT	30 September 2023	1.NE	Patrycja Lorkowska (POL); Natalia Krześlak (POL)	Malwina Mul (POL); Dominika Włodarczyk (POL)	Kamila Pastuszek (POL); Zuzanna Chylińska (POL)	
(Slovenia) Navkreber na Strmo Reber	30 September 2023	1.NE	Špela Škrajnar (SVN)	Eva Vidak (SVN)	Adriana Zrim (SVN)	
(United States) New Mexico State Championship Road Race	30 September 2023	1.NE	Leidy Sánchez (PER)	Manuelita Villar (PER)	Malú Reyes (PER)	
(Belgium) Boechout Kriterium	1 October 2023	1.NE	Brigitte Vanderheyden (BEL)	Jade Dewachter (BEL)	Ilse Doms (BEL)	
(Belgium) De Cyclist Bikeshop Poperinge	1 October 2023	1.NE	Eline Buyssens (BEL)	Marlies Vanhoorneweder (BEL)	Elise Vanhamme (BEL)	
(Belgium) Berchem Classix	1 October 2023	1.NE	Kelly Druyts (BEL)	Marieke Meert (BEL)	Naomi De Roeck (BEL)	
(Belgium) Gravel European Championship	1 October 2023	1.NE/Gravel	Tiffany Cromwell (AUS)	Lorena Wiebes (NED)	Fem van Empel (NED)	
(Denmark) Holbæks åbne løb	1 October 2023	1.NE	Marita Jensen (DEN)	Alberte Greve (DEN)	Sigrid Haugset (NOR)	
(Hungary) Turul Kupa	1 October 2023	1.NE	Eszter Bordás (HUN)	Valéria Ducza (HUN)		
(Republic of Ireland) Munster Hill Climb Championships	1 October 2023	1.NE	Sally Drennan (IRL)			
(Italy) Coppa Città di San Daniele Rosa	1 October 2023	1.NE	Alessia Vigilia (ITA)	Silvia Zanardi (ITA)	Francesca Tommasi (ITA)	
(Malaysia) Selangor Criterium Series	1 October 2023	1.NE	Nur Aisyah Mohamad Zubir (MAS)	Zhen Yi Yeong (MAS)	Ci Hui Nyo (MAS)	
Poland TTT Championships	1 October 2023	1.NE	MAT Atom Deweloper Wrocław I	TKK Pacific Nestlé Fitness	MAT Atom Deweloper Wrocław II	
(Belgium) Herfstcriterium Oostrozebeke	2 October 2023	1.NE	Lotte Kopecky (BEL)	Ilse Pluimers (NED)	Valerie Demey (BEL)	
(Germany) Wahoo Rival Crit Köln	3 October 2023	1.NE	Mieke Kröger (GER)	Mira Winkelhag (GER)	Nele Laing (GER)	
(Germany) Schwabacher Stadtparkrennen	3 October 2023	1.NE	Romy Kasper (GER)	Lena Gömmel (GER)	Tanja Frühmesser (GER)	
(Germany) LV-Meisterschaft Einzelzeitfahren Brandenburg	7 October 2023	1.NE	Sam Sandten (GER)	Yvonne Wildt (GER)	Vanessa Laws (GER)	
(Italy) Gravel World Championship	7 October 2023	1.NE/Gravel	Katarzyna Niewiadoma (POL)	Silvia Persico (ITA)	Demi Vollering (NED)	
(Slovenia) Vzpon za pokal občine Kobarid	7 October 2023	1.NE	Špela Škrajnar (SVN)	Federica Bazzocchi (ITA)	Ema Štrancar (SVN)	
(Germany) Kriterium Rund um d´Kirch	8 October 2023	1.NE	Theresa Birk (GER)	Franziska Schmid (GER)	Claudia Marek (GER)	
(Guam) Southern Discomfort Road Race	8 October 2023	1.NE	Jennifer Camacho (GUM)	Katrina Ostermann (GUM)		
(Republic of Ireland) Cycling Ireland Hill Climb National Championships	8 October 2023	1.NE	Sophie Daly (IRL)	Niamh O'Dwyer (IRL)	Lisa Stapelbroek (IRL)	
(Slovenia) Automaster Grand Prix	8 October 2023	1.NE	Nika Bobnar (SVN)	Hana Žumer (SVN)	Špela Colnar (SVN)	
(Japan) Mt. Oboshi HC	14 October 2023	1.NE	Emi Kukino (JPN)	Mayumi Abe (JPN)	Masami Shimomura (JPN)	
(Denmark) Danish Women's Gravel National Championships	14 October 2023	1.NE	Emma Norsgaard (DEN)	Anne Holm (DEN)	Trine Andersen (DEN)	
(Netherlands) Merida NL Gravel Series #5	14 October 2023	1.NE	Elisa Serné (NED)	Mariëlle Trouwborst (NED)	Michelle De Graaf (NED)	
(United States) Belgian Waffle Ride Kansas	14 October 2023	1.NE	Cecily Decker (USA)	Whitney Allison (USA)	Hannah Shell (USA)	
(Japan) Shunan Criterium	15 October 2023	1.NE	Rina Furukawa (JPN)	Emi Kukino (JPN)	Krisztina Baranyai (HUN)	

== Stage races (2.1 and 2.2) ==
Race	Date	Cat. †	Winner	Second	Third	Ref
(Argentina) Vuelta a Formosa Femenina	21–23 October 2022	2.2	Aranza Villalón (CHI)	Agua Marina Espínola (PAR)	Cristina Tonetti (ITA)	
Le Tour de Femina Malaysia	15–20 November 2022	2.2	Transferred for 2023.			
(Italy) Trofeo Ponente in Rosa	7–11 March	2.2	Jolanda Neff (SUI)	Yanina Kuskova (UZB)	Sina Frei (SUI)	
(Spain) Vuelta Ciclista a Extremadura Feminas	10–12 March	2.2	Megan Armitage (IRL)	Clara Emond (CAN)	Maaike Coljé (NED)	
(France) Tour de Normandie féminin	17–19 March	2.1	Cédrine Kerbaol (FRA)	Gladys Verhulst (FRA)	Martina Alzini (ITA)	
Tour of Thailand	8–10 April	2.1	Lee Eun-hee (KOR)	Nur Aisyah Mohamad Zubir (MAS)	Agustina Delia Priatna (INA)	
(United States) Tour of the Gila	26–30 April	2.2	Austin Killips (USA)	Marcela Prieto (MEX)	Emily Ehrlich (USA)	
(Czech Republic) Gracia–Orlová	27–30 April	2.2	Jenny Rissveds (SWE)	Dominika Włodarczyk (POL)	Emilia Fahlin (SWE)	
(France) Bretagne Ladies Tour	9–13 May	2.1	Grace Brown (AUS)	Coralie Demay (FRA)	Alessia Vigilia (ITA)	
(United States) Joe Martin Stage Race	18–21 May	2.2	Lauren Stephens (USA)	Emily Ehrlich (USA)	Émilie Fortin (CAN)	
(Czech Republic) Tour de Feminin	25–28 May	2.2	Olha Kulynych (UKR)	Dominika Włodarczyk (POL)	Eliška Kvasničková (CZE)	
(Spain) Vuelta Andalucia Women	31 May – 4 June	2.1	Katrine Aalerud (NOR)	Mie Bjørndal Ottestad (NOR)	Tamara Dronova (RUS)	
(Serbia) Belgrade GP Woman Tour	3–4 June	2.2	Nikola Bajgerová (CZE)	Olga Wankiewicz (POL)	Olga Shekel (UKR)	
Vuelta Femenina a Guatemala	7–11 June	2.2	Lilibeth Chacón (VEN)	Karen Villamizar (COL)	Jasmin Soto (GUA)	
(France) Tour Féminin des Pyrénées	9–11 June	2.1	Marta Cavalli (ITA)	Ashleigh Moolman (RSA)	Antonia Niedermaier (GER)	
(Belgium) BeNe Ladies Tour	12–16 July	2.1	Lucinda Brand (NED)	Emma Norsgaard (DEN)	Anna Henderson (GBR)	
Vuelta a Colombia Femenina	26–30 July	2.2	Lilibeth Chacón (VEN)	Diana Peñuela (COL)	Ana Sanabria (COL)	
(Poland) Princess Anna Vasa Tour	28–30 July	2.2	Valeriya Kononenko (UKR)	Dominika Włodarczyk (POL)	Olga Zabelinskaya (UZB)	
(Italy) Giro della Toscana Int. Femminile – Memorial Michela Fanini	24–27 August	2.2	Alessia Vigilia (ITA)	Rasa Leleivytė (LTU)	Anastasiya Kolesava (BLR)	
(France) Tour de l'Avenir Femmes	28 August – 1 September	2.2U	Shirin van Anrooij (NED)	Anna Shackley (GBR)	Gaia Realini (ITA)	
(France) Tour Cycliste Féminin International de l'Ardèche	5–11 September	2.1	Marta Cavalli (ITA)	Erica Magnaldi (ITA)	Anastasiya Kolesava (BLR)	
(Belgium) AG Tour de la Semois	15–16 September	2.2	Karlijn Swinkels (NED)	Clara Koppenburg (GER)	Noemi Rüegg (SUI)	
(Netherlands) Watersley Women's Challenge	15–17 September	2.2U	Dominika Włodarczyk (POL)	Valentina Basilico (ITA)	Eline Jansen (NED)	
Vuelta Femenina Internacional a Costa Rica	12–15 October	2.2	Lilibeth Chacón (VEN)	Nadia Gontova (CAN)	Marcela Prieto (MEX)	

== Stage races (2.NE) ==
Race	Date	Cat. †	Winner	Second	Third	Ref
(Uruguay) Vuelta a Canelones	16 October 2022	2.NE	Natalia Beatríz Guedes (URU)	Ana Claudia Seijas (URU)	Vikla Yenniers Lopez (URU)	
Tour du Burundi féminin	24–29 October 2022	2.NE	Ebtissam Mohamed (EGY)	Deborah Okito (COD)	Emmanuella Rukundo (BDI)	
(Colombia) Vuelta Antioquia Femenina	25–27 October 2022	2.NE	Carolina Vargas (COL)	Esther Galarza (ECU)	Lorena Colmenares (COL)	
(Colombia) Vuelta Femenino del Porvenir	2–6 November 2022	2.NE	Camila Atahualpa (COL)	Jessenia Meneses (COL)	Carolina Vargas (COL)	
(Uruguay) Rutas de América Femenina	11–13 November 2022	2.NE	Yanina Acosta (ARG)	Daniela Romina Jobse (ARG)	Mariana García Britos (URU)	
Vuelta Femenina al Ecuador	15–18 November 2022	2.NE	Miryam Núñez (ECU)	Esther Galarza (ECU)	Daniela Zambrano (ECU)	
(Colombia) Clásica Ramón Emilio Arcila	16–18 November 2022	2.NE	Erika Milena Botero (COL)	Camila Atahualpa (COL)	Carolina Vargas (COL)	
(Colombia) Vuelta a Boyaca Femenina	16–20 November 2022	2.NE	Sara Juliana Moreno (COL)	Ana Sanabria (COL)	Estefanía Herrera (COL)	
(Australia) Tour of Tasmania	25–27 November 2022	2.NE	Justine Barrow (AUS)	Amber Pate (AUS)	Danielle de Francesco (AUS)	
Vuelta a Venezuela Femenina	29 November – 4 December 2022	2.NE	Wilmarys Moreno (VEN)	Maria Rueda Cáceres (VEN)	Rosimber Montaña Pineda (VEN)	
(Australia) Tour of Bright	3–4 December 2022	2.NE	Georgie Howe (AUS)	Justine Barrow (AUS)	Matilda Raynolds (AUS)	
(Australia) Bay Classic Series	1–3 January 2023	2.NE	Ruby Roseman-Gannon (AUS)	Georgia Baker (AUS)	Chloe Hosking (AUS)	
(Argentina) Vuelta a San Juan Femenina	19–21 January 2023	2.NE	Aylén Balmaceda (ARG)	Nelismar Gómez Villarroel (ARG)	Carolina Pérez (ARG)	
(Argentina) Vuelta Del Porvenir San Luis Femenina	4–5 February 2023	2.NE	Paola Silva (URU)	Carolina Pérez (ARG)	Yamila Palacios (ARG)	
(Namibia) Tour de Windhoek	16–19 February 2023	2.NE	Melissa Hinz (NAM)	Anri Krugel (NAM)	Genevieve Weber (NAM)	
(United States) Valley of the Sun Race	17–19 February 2023	2.NE	Emily Ehrlich (USA)	Marlies Mejías (CUB)	Maeghan Easler (USA)	
(Colombia) Clasica de Rionegro	21–24 February 2023	2.NE	María Latriglia (COL)	Ana Fagua (COL)	Stefania Sanchez (COL)	
(United States) Tucson Bicycle Classic	3–5 March 2023	2.NE	Kira Payer (USA)	Florence Howden (USA)	Mallory Macrostie (USA)	
(Colombia) Vuelta Al Tolima	8–12 March 2023	2.NE	Lilibeth Chacón (VEN)	Jessenia Meneses (COL)	Sara Juliana Moreno (COL)	
(Vietnam) Biwase Cup	8–17 March 2023	2.NE	Chaniporn Batriya (THA)	Phetdarin Somrat (THA)	Quỳnh Bùi Thị (VIE)	
Tour Femenino de Uruguay	10–12 March 2023	2.NE	Florencia Giordano (URU)	Micaela Gutiérrez (ARG)	Fiorella Malaspina (ARG)	
(United Kingdom) The Peaks 2 Day	18–19 March 2023	2.NE	Tamsin Miller (GBR)	Amalia Langham (AUS)	Connie Hayes (GBR)	
(Russia) Tour of Adygeya	1–4 April 2023	2.NE	Hanna Tserakh (BLR)	Daria Buneeva (RUS)	Nastassia Kiptsikava (BLR)	
(Denmark) 3 Dage i Nord	8–10 April 2023	2.NE	Marita Jensen (DEN)	Mia Sofie Rützou (DEN)	Marie-Louise Hartz Krogager (DEN)	
(United States) Redlands Bicycle Classic	12–16 April 2023	2.NE	Emily Ehrlich (USA)	Marcela Prieto (MEX)	Melisa Rollins (USA)	
(Colombia) Vuelta al Sur del Huila y Tolima	13–16 April 2023	2.NE	Carolina Vargas (COL)	María Fernanda Agudelo (COL)	María Latriglia (COL)	
(Germany) Tour de Allgäu	14–15 April 2023	2.NE	Mira Fischer (GER)	Lena Götzenberger (GER)	Hanna Dopjans (GER)	
(Colombia) Clásica Ciudad de Anapoima	18–20 April 2023	2.NE	Karina Flórez (COL)	Jasmin Soto (GUA)	Leidy Paola Torres (COL)	
(Lithuania) Open Utena Spring Championships	21–22 April 2023	1.NE	Akvilė Gedraitytė (LTU)	Kotryna Strakšytė (LTU)	Eglė Dubauskaitė (LTU)	
(Italy) Giro Mediterraneo in Rosa	21–23 April 2023	2.NE	Carlotta Cipressi (ITA)	Beatrice Rossato (ITA)	Silvia Zanardi (ITA)	
(France) Loire Ladies Tour	22–23 April 2023	2.NE	Chloé Charpentier (FRA)	Julia Aubry (FRA)	Constance Valentin (FRA)	
(France) Tour de l'Orne	22–23 April 2023	2.NE	Constance Marchand (FRA)	Aurore Pernollet (FRA)	Sylvia Le Gleut (FRA)	
(Sweden) Skåne 3-dagars	29 April – 1 May 2023	2.NE	Matilda Frantzich (SWE)	Erika Ingves (FIN)	Ella Wahlström (SWE)	
(Latvia) Jānis Baukš Memorial Cup	13–14 May 2023	2.NE	Lāsma Elza Vaivode (LVA)	Anita Antone (LVA)	Eglė Dubauskaitė (LTU)	
(Belgium) Vermarc Cycling Project	20–21 May 2023	2.NE	Babette Rosman (NED)	Caoimhe O'Brien (IRL)	Marieke Meert (BEL)	
(Denmark) Campione Pinse Cup	27–29 May 2023	2.NE	Marie-Louise Hartz Krogager (DEN)	Julie Nielsen Maribo (DEN)	Stine Marie Snortheim (NOR)	
(Latvia) Smiltene Cup	9–11 June 2023	2.NE	Auksė Lekavičiūtė (LTU) (ITT); Auksė Lekavičiūtė (LTU) (RR)	Adelīna Jefimova (LVA) (ITT) [[Madara Āboma]] (LVA) (RR)	Samanta Luberte (LVA) (ITT); Paula Patrīcija Tilko (LVA) (RR)	
(Switzerland) Radsportfest Märwil	1–2 July 2023	2.NE	Katharina Fox (GER)	Marie Schreiber (LUX)	Linda Zanetti (SUI)	
(Denmark) Randers Bike Week	3–6 August 2023	2.NE	Trine Andersen (DEN)	Laura Lizette Sander (EST)	Magdalene Lind (NOR)	
(Colombia) Clásica Carmen de Viboral	15–18 August 2023	2.NE	Erika Botero (COL)	Lorena Colmenares (COL)	Natalia Carmona (COL)	
(Germany) Großer Preis der Brauerei Bellheimer	19–20 August 2023	2.NE	Daniela Gass (GER)	Mareike Spindler (GER)	Katharina Eggers (GER)	
(Sweden) Svanesunds 3-dagars	25–27 August 2023	2.NE	Ella Wahlström (SWE)	Lovisa Nyman (SWE)	Alma Johansson (SWE)	
(Latvia) Elektrum Vienības	2–3 September 2023	2.NE	Laura Lizette Sander (EST)	Madara Āboma (LVA)	Lāsma Elza Vaivode (LVA)	
Volta Portugal Feminina	13–17 September 2023	2.NE	Valeria Valgonen (RUS)	Miryam Núñez (ECU)	Marina Garau (ESP)	
(Chile) Bici Fest Ruta La Fresia	23–24 September 2023	1.NE	Priscilla Ojeda (CHI)	Betzeida Ojeda (CHI)		
(Trinidad and Tobago) Tobago International Cycling Classic	28 September – 1 October 2023	2.NE	Alexi Ramirez (TTO)			
(Colombia) Vuelta a Nariño	28 September – 2 October 2023	2.NE	Lorena Colmenares (COL)	Yury Marcela Alzate (COL)	Leidy Viviana Telpiz (COL)	
(Russia) Memorial Kiselev	28 September – 2 October 2023	2.NE	Valeria Kovyazina (RUS)	Regina Dzhaparova (RUS)	Alena Simakova (RUS)	
(Rwanda) Kirihe Race	30 September – 1 October 2023	2.NE	Diane Ingabire (RWA)	Djazilla Mwamikazi (RWA)	Martha Ntakirutimana (RWA)	
(Colombia) Vuelta a Antioquia Femenina	4–7 October 2023	2.NE	Esther Galarza (ECU)	Andrea Alzate (COL)	Gabriela López (COL)	
(Mauritius) Courts Mammouth Tour	6–8 October 2023	2.NE	Aurelie Halbwachs (MRI)			
(United States) Hellhole Gravel Grind	6–8 October 2023	2.NE	Val Cummings (USA)	Alexis Hatch (USA)	Melinda Smith (USA)	
(Namibia) Paratus Namibian Cycle Classic	7–8 October 2023	2.NE	Melissa Hinz (NAM)	Monique Du Plessis (NAM)	Monique Taylor (NAM)	
(Colombia) Clásica de Aguazul	14–16 October 2023	2.NE	María Paula Latriglia (COL)	Yisela Diagama Franco (COL)	Serika Guluma (COL)	

== Junior races ==
Race	Date	Cat. †	Winner	Second	Third	Ref
(Dominican Republic) Road Youth Caribbean Championships ITT	23 November 2022	1.2	Annabelle Miller (BER)	Chanelle Russell (JAM)	Rasselle Ogando (DOM)	
(Dominican Republic) Road Youth Caribbean Championships RR	24 November 2022	1.2	Annabelle Miller (BER)	Chanelle Russell (JAM)	Rasselle Ogando (DOM)	
(Italy) Piccolo Trofeo Alfredo Binda	19 March 2023	1.Ncup	Cat Ferguson (GBR)	Julie Bego (FRA)	Silje Bader (NED)	
(Belgium) Gent–Wevelgem	26 March 2023	1.1	Izzy Sharp (GBR)	Cat Ferguson (GBR)	Anna Vanderaerden (BEL)	
(Netherlands) EPZ Omloop van Borsele	21–23 April 2023	2.Ncup	Izzy Sharp (GBR)	Federica Venturelli (ITA)	Cat Ferguson (GBR)	
(France) Tour du Gévaudan Occitanie femmes	6–7 May 2023	2.Ncup	Federica Venturelli (ITA)	Julie Bego (FRA)	Xaydée Van Sinaey (BEL)	
(Spain) Bizkaikoloreak	22–23 July 2023	2.Ncup	Julie Bego (FRA)	Cat Ferguson (GBR)	Célia Gery (FRA)	
(France) Grand Prix CERATIZIT Women Junior	2 September 2023	1.1	Carys Lloyd (GBR)	Ella Heremans (BEL)	Titia Ryo (FRA)	
(Netherlands) Watersley Ladies Challenge	15–17 September 2023	2.Ncup	Federica Venturelli (ITA)	Fleur Moors (BEL)	Carys Lloyd (GBR)	
(Dominican Republic) Road Junior Caribbean Championships ITT	16 September 2023	1.1	Gabrielle Gabourel (BLZ)	Kami Roach (BAH)	Melsey Yamely Perez (DOM)	
(Dominican Republic) Road Junior Caribbean Championships RR	17 September 2023	1.1	Melsey Yamely Perez (DOM)	Kami Roach (BAH)	Gabrielle Gabourel (BLZ)	
(Belgium) European Gravel Continental Championships	1 October 2023	1.NE/Gravel	Shanyl De Schoesitter (BEL)	Eline De Winter (BEL)	Hanne Vandoorne (BEL)	
(France) Chrono des Nations	15 October 2023	1.1	Léane Tabu (FRA)	Titia Ryo (FRA)	Alice Toniolli (ITA)	

== Continental championships ==
Championships	Race	Winner	Second	Third
African Road Championships; Ghana 8–13 February (2023 summary)	Road race	Ese Lovina Ukpeseraye (NGR)	Awa Bamogo (BUR)	Lucie de Marigny-Lagesse (MRI)
African Road Championships; Ghana 8–13 February (2023 summary)	Individual time trial	Aurélie Halbwachs (MRI)	Valantine Nzayisenga (RWA)	Kimberley Le Court (MRI)
African Road Championships; Ghana 8–13 February (2023 summary)	Road race (U23)	Diane Ingabire (RWA)	Xaverine Nirere (RWA)	Nesrine Houili (ALG)
African Road Championships; Ghana 8–13 February (2023 summary)	Individual time trial (U23)	Nesrine Houili (ALG)	Diane Ingabire (RWA)	Raja Chakir (MAR)
African Road Championships; Ghana 8–13 February (2023 summary)	Road race (Junior)	Mechab Malik (ALG)	Hosna Bellile (ALG)	Keno Disasa (ETH)
African Road Championships; Ghana 8–13 February (2023 summary)	Individual time trial (Junior)	Siham Bousba (ALG)	Mechab Malik (ALG)	Keno Disasa (ETH)
African Road Championships; Ghana 8–13 February (2023 summary)	Team Time Trial	Mauritius (MRI); Lucie de Marigny-Lagesse; Aurélie Halbwachs; Raphaëlle Lamusse; Kimberley Le Court	Namibia (NAM); Anri Krugel; Courtney Liebenberg; Vera Looser; Melissa Hinz	Rwanda (RWA); Xaverine Nirere; Valantine Nzayisenga; Diane Ingabire
African Road Championships; Ghana 8–13 February (2023 summary)	Junior Team Time Trial	Algeria (ALG); Soulef Silmi; Siham Bousba; Hosna Bellile; Mechab Malik	Ethiopia (ETH); Keno Disasa; Tseige Yigezu	
African Road Championships; Ghana 8–13 February (2023 summary)	Mixed Team Time Trial	Mauritius (MRI); Aurélie Halbwachs; Raphaëlle Lamusse; Kimberley Le Court; Alexandre Mayer; Gregory Mayer; Christopher Lagane	Rwanda (RWA); Etienne Tuyizere; Samuel Niyonkuru; Eric Muhoza; Valentine Nzayisenga; Diane Ingabire; Xaverine Nirere	Burkina Faso (BUR); Awa Bamogo; Pascaline Dambinga; Issouf Ilboudo; Vincent Mouni; Bachirou Nikiema; Lamoussa Zoungrana
Oceania Road Cycling Championships; Australia 30 March – 1 April 2023 (2023 summary)	Road race	Sophie Edwards (AUS)	Matilda Raynolds (AUS)	Ruth Corset (AUS)
Oceania Road Cycling Championships; Australia 30 March – 1 April 2023 (2023 summary)	Individual time trial	Georgia Perry (NZL)	Bronwyn MacGregor (NZL)	Celestine Franz (AUS)
Oceania Road Cycling Championships; Australia 30 March – 1 April 2023 (2023 summary)	Individual time trial (U23)	Isabelle Carnes (AUS)	Alli Anderson (AUS)	Haylee Fuller (AUS)
Oceania Road Cycling Championships; Australia 30 March – 1 April 2023 (2023 summary)	Road race (Junior)	Talia Appleton (AUS)	Felicity Wilson-Haffenden (AUS)	Nicole Duncan (AUS)
Oceania Road Cycling Championships; Australia 30 March – 1 April 2023 (2023 summary)	Individual time trial (Junior)	Felicity Wilson-Haffenden (AUS)	Mackenzie Coupland (AUS)	Keira Will (AUS)
Pan American Road Championships; Panama 18–22 April 2023 (2023 summary)	Road race	Skylar Schneider (USA)	Alison Jackson (CAN)	Catalina Soto (CHI)
Pan American Road Championships; Panama 18–22 April 2023 (2023 summary)	Individual time trial	Amber Neben (USA)	Aranza Villalón (CHI)	Alison Jackson (CAN)
Pan American Road Championships; Panama 18–22 April 2023 (2023 summary)	Road race (Junior)	Angie Mariana Londoño (COL)	Juliana Londoño (COL)	Mayra Costa (BRA)
Pan American Road Championships; Panama 18–22 April 2023 (2023 summary)	Individual time trial (Junior)	Juliana Londoño (COL)	Angie Mariana Londoño (COL)	Javiera Mansilla (CHI)
Asian Road Championships; Thailand 7–13 June (2023 summary)	Road race	Nguyễn Thị Thật (VIE)	Sun Jiajun (CHN)	Jutatip Maneephan (THA)
Asian Road Championships; Thailand 7–13 June (2023 summary)	Individual time trial	Olga Zabelinskaya (UZB)	Na A-reum (KOR)	Rinata Sultanova (KAZ)
Asian Road Championships; Thailand 7–13 June (2023 summary)	Individual time trial (U23)	Yanina Kuskova (UZB)	Yuhang Cui (CHN)	Evgeniya Golotina (UZB)
Asian Road Championships; Thailand 7–13 June (2023 summary)	Road race (Junior)	Thách Thị Ngọc Thảo (VIE)	Evgenia Zaam (KAZ)	Asal Rizaeva (UZB)
Asian Road Championships; Thailand 7–13 June (2023 summary)	Individual time trial (Junior)	Nguyễn Thị Be Hồng (VIE)	Asal Rizaeva (UZB)	Lee Chai Roug (TPE)
Asian Road Championships; Thailand 7–13 June (2023 summary)	Mixed Team Time Trial	Kazakhstan (KAZ); Igor Chzhan; Yevgeniy Fedorov; Rinata Sultanova; Makhabbat Umutzhanova; Dmitriy Gruzdev; Marina Kuzmina	Uzbekistan (UZB); Dmitriy Bocharov; Behzodek Rakhimbaev; Evgeniya Golotina; Aleksey Fomovskiy; Olga Zabelinskaya; Yanina Kuskova	China (CHN); Niu Yikui; Cui Yuhang; Sun Jiajun; Bai Li Jun; Wang Tingting; Liu Jiankun
Asian Road Championships; Thailand 7–13 June (2023 summary)	Mixed Team Time Trial (Junior)	Kazakhstan (KAZ); Mikhail Podluzhnyy; Batyrkhan Alik; Evgenia Zaam; Viktoriya Marchuk; Mansur Beisembay; Ekaterina Udovykina	Thailand (THA); Tinnapat Muangdet; Natcha Songkhen; Aphisit Supan; Nuntakorn Nontakeaw; Pittayapron Seatun; Chin Rungchotwattana	Uzbekistan (UZB); Farrukh Bobosherov; Mohinabonu Elmurodova; Asal Rizaeva; Diyor Takhirov; Sevinch Yuldasheva; Kamoliddin Bakhriddinov
Championnats d'Europe des Grimpeurs; SUI 30 July (2023 summary)	Elite	Illi Gardner (GBR)	Anna Plattner (AUT)	Anna Kiesenhofer (AUT)
Championnats d'Europe des Grimpeurs; SUI 30 July (2023 summary)	U23	Lisa Strothmann (GER)	Iryna Shymanska (UKR)	Franziska Ehrenreich (AUT)
Championnats d'Europe des Grimpeurs; SUI 30 July (2023 summary)	Junior	Sarah Strothmann (GER)		
European Road Championships; Netherlands 20–24 September (2023 summary)	Road race	Mischa Bredewold (NED)	Lorena Wiebes (NED)	Lotte Kopecky (BEL)
European Road Championships; Netherlands 20–24 September (2023 summary)	Individual time trial	Marlen Reusser (SUI)	Anna Henderson (GBR)	Christina Schweinberger (AUT)
European Road Championships; Netherlands 20–24 September (2023 summary)	Road race (U23)	Ilse Pluimers (NED)	Anna Shackley (GBR)	Linda Zanetti (SUI)
European Road Championships; Netherlands 20–24 September (2023 summary)	Individual time trial (U23)	Zoe Bäckstedt (GBR)	Antonia Niedermaier (GER)	Anniina Ahtosalo (FIN)
European Road Championships; Netherlands 20–24 September (2023 summary)	Road race (Junior)	Fleur Moors (BEL)	Federica Venturelli (ITA)	Léane Tabu (FRA)
European Road Championships; Netherlands 20–24 September (2023 summary)	Individual time trial (Junior)	Federica Venturelli (ITA)	Stina Kagevi (SWE)	Hannah Kunz (GER)
European Road Championships; Netherlands 20–24 September (2023 summary)	Mixed Team Relay	France (FRA); Juliette Labous; Bruno Armirail; Rémi Cavagna; Cédrine Kerbaol; Benjamin Thomas; Audrey Cordon-Ragot	Italy (ITA); Edoardo Affini; Mattia Cattaneo; Elena Cecchini; Vittoria Guazzini; Matteo Sobrero; Soraya Paladin	Germany (GER); Lisa Klein; Mieke Kröger; Max Walscheid; Jannik Steimle; Franziska Koch; Miguel Heidemann
European Road Championships; Netherlands 20–24 September (2023 summary)	Mixed Team Relay (Junior)	Italy (ITA); Luca Giaimi; Andrea Bessega; Federica Venturelli; Alice Toniolli; Andrea Montagner; Eleonora La Bella	Germany (GER); Moritz Bell; Ian Kings; Louis Leidert; Pia Grünewald; Hannah Kunz; Amelie Joelle Messemer	France (FRA); Léo Bisiaux; Léane Tabu; Alice Brédard; Julie Bego; Maxime Decomble; Eliott Boulet

== Others ==
Championships	Race	Winner	Second	Third
2023 SEA Games; Cambodia 6–13 May 2023(2023 summary)	Road race	Nguyễn Thị Thật (VIE)	Jutatip Maneephan (THA)	Nur Aisyah Mohamad Zubir (MAS)
2023 SEA Games; Cambodia 6–13 May 2023(2023 summary)	Individual time trial	Jutatip Maneephan (THA)	Nguyễn Thị Thật (VIE)	Nur Aisyah Mohamad Zubir (MAS)
2023 Central American and Caribbean Games; El Salvador 25 June – 7 July 2023 (2023 summary)	Road race	Arlenis Sierra (CUB)	Lilibeth Chacón (VEN)	Jasmin Soto (GUA)
2023 Central American and Caribbean Games; El Salvador 25 June – 7 July 2023 (2023 summary)	Individual time trial	Arlenis Sierra (CUB)	Diana Peñuela (COL)	Caitlin Conyers (BER)
2023 Pan Arab Games; Algeria 9–13 July 2023 (2023 summary)	Road race	Chahra Azzouz (ALG)	Khadidja Araoui (ALG)	Yasmine Elmeddah (ALG)
2023 Pan Arab Games; Algeria 9–13 July 2023 (2023 summary)	Individual time trial	Nesrine Houili (ALG)	Miran Alfares (SYR)	Daniah Sembawa (KSA)
2023 Pan Arab Games; Algeria 9–13 July 2023 (2023 summary)	Team time trial	Algeria (ALG); Khadidja Araoui; Siham Bousba; Yasmine Elmeddah; Nesrine Houili	Syria (SYR); Maha Shmels; Miran Al-Fares; Lujain Hassan	Saudi Arabia (KSA); Monirah Al-Draiweesh; Mashael Al-Hazmi; Daniah Sembawa
2023 Island Games; Guernsey 10–14 July 2023 (2023 summary)	Road race	Jamie-Lee Wright (Guernsey)	Hannah Brehaut (Guernsey)	Flo Thomas (Jersey)
2023 Island Games; Guernsey 10–14 July 2023 (2023 summary)	Individual time trial	Hannah Brehaut (Guernsey)	Flo Thomas (Jersey)	Gwenno Hughes (Ynys Môn)
2023 Island Games; Guernsey 10–14 July 2023 (2023 summary)	Criterium	Olivia Lett (GIB)	Flo Thomas (Jersey)	Elaine Pratts (GIB)
2023 Island Games; Guernsey 10–14 July 2023 (2023 summary)	Team time trial	Guernsey (Guernsey); Hannah Brehaut; Helena Duguid; Danielle Hanley; Karina Jackson; Jamie-Lee Wright	Gibraltar (GIB); Olivia Lett; Natalia Nunez; Elaine Pratts	not awarded
2023 Island Games; Guernsey 10–14 July 2023 (2023 summary)	Team Road Race	Guernsey (Guernsey); Hannah Brehaut; Helena Duguid; Danielle Hanley; Karina Jackson; Jamie-Lee Wright	Jersey (Jersey); Katie Silva; Flo Thomas; Chloe Watson Hill	Gibraltar (GIB); Olivia Lett; Natalia Nunez; Elaine Pratts
2023 Island Games; Guernsey 10–14 July 2023 (2023 summary)	Team Criterium	Gibraltar (GIB); Olivia Lett; Natalia Nunez; Elaine Pratts	not awarded	not awarded
2023 Jeux de la Francophonie; Democratic Republic of the Congo 30 July 2023(2023 summary)	Road race	Salma Hariri (MAR)	Chaimae Ez-Zakraoui (MAR)	Wissal Baoubbou (MAR)
2023 Commonwealth Youth Games; Trinidad and Tobago 5 August 2023(2023 summary)	Road Race	Keira Will (AUS)	Lauren Bates (AUS)	Ruby Oakes (GBR)
2023 Commonwealth Youth Games; Trinidad and Tobago 5 August 2023(2023 summary)	ITT	Lauren Bates (AUS)	Keira Will (AUS)	Ruby Oakes (GBR)
2022 Asian Games; China 3–5 September 2023(2023 summary)	Road Race	Yang Qianyu (HKG)	Na Ah-reum (KOR)	Jutatip Maneephan (THA)
2022 Asian Games; China 3–5 September 2023(2023 summary)	ITT	Olga Zabelinskaya (UZB)	Eri Yonamine (JPN)	Rinata Sultanova (KAZ)
2023 Pan American Games; Chile 21 October – 5 November 2023(2023 summary)	Road Race	Lauren Stephens (USA)	Miryam Núñez (ECU)	Agua Marina Espínola (PAR)
2023 Pan American Games; Chile 21 October – 5 November 2023(2023 summary)	ITT	Kristen Faulkner (USA)	Arlenis Sierra (CUB)	Aranza Villalón (CHI)

== National champions ==
=== Women's Elite ===
Country	Women's Elite Road Race Champion	Road Race Champion's Team	Women's Elite Time Trial Champion	Time Trial Champion's Team
Algeria	Yasmine Elmeddah	Lyon Sprint Evolution	Khadidja Araoui	
Argentina	Micaela Gutiérrez	Buona Vita Team	Fernanda Yapura	Team Grand Est - Komugi - La Fabrique
Australia	Brodie Chapman	Lidl–Trek	Grace Brown	Arkéa–B&B Hotels
Austria	Carina Schrempf	Fenix-Deceuninck Continental	Anna Kiesenhofer	Israel Premier Tech Roland
Azerbaijan			Viktoriya Sidorenko	
Bahamas			Smobia Moreau	
Belarus	Hanna Tserakh	Minsk Cycling Club	Hanna Tserakh	Minsk Cycling Club
Belgium	Lotte Kopecky	SD Worx	Lotte Kopecky	SD Worx
Belize	Kaya Cattouse	LA Sweat	Patricia Chavarria	
Benin	Hermione Ahouissou		Hermione Ahouissou	
Bermuda	Caitlin Conyers		Caitlin Conyers	
Bolivia	Elizabeth Vasquez	Bici Sprint	Abigail Sarabia	Team Sarabia
Bosnia and Herzegovina	Martina Čondra		Martina Čondra	
Brazil	Ana Vitória Magalhães	Bizkaia–Durango	Ana Paula Polegatch	Indaiatuba Cycling Team
British Virgin Islands	Olympia Maduro Fahie		Olympia Maduro Fahie	
Bulgaria	Viktoriya Danova		Iveta Kostadinova	
Burkina Faso	Lamoussa Zoungrana			
Cameroon	Presline Kengne			
Canada	Alison Jackson	EF Education–Tibco–SVB	Paula Findlay	
Chile	Karla Vallejos	Team Ruteros La Unión	Aranza Villalón	Eneicat–CMTeam–Seguros Deportivos
China	Zeng Luyao		Wang Tingting	
Colombia	Diana Peñuela	DNA Pro Cycling	Lina Hernández	Colombia Pacto por el Deporte
Costa Rica	Dixiana Quesada	Colono - Bikestation - Clips	Milagro Mena	Colono - Bikestation - Clips
Croatia	Majda Horvat		Mia Radotić	Cogeas-Mettler-Look Pro Cycling
Cuba	Arlenis Sierra	Movistar Team	Arlenis Sierra	Movistar Team
Cyprus	Antri Christoforou	Human Powered Health	Antri Christoforou	Human Powered Health
Czech Republic	Jarmila Machačová	Dukla Women Cycling	Eliška Kvasničková	MIX Brilon - Sportraces
Denmark	Rebecca Koerner	Uno-X Pro Cycling Team	Emma Norsgaard	Movistar Team
Dominican Republic	Gabriella Tejada		Mónica Rodríguez	
Ecuador	Ana Vivar	Movistar–Best PC	Miryam Núñez	Massi–Tactic
Egypt	Ebtissam Mohamed	Zaaf Cycling Team	Ebtissam Mohamed	Zaaf Cycling Team
El Salvador	Sauking Shi	Gravity-Analiza	Massiel Martínez	
Eritrea	Ksanet Gebremeskel			
Estonia	Laura Lizette Sander	AG Insurance-NXTG U23	Laura Lizette Sander	AG Insurance-NXTG U23
Eswatini	Nontsikelelo Mdlovu			
Ethiopia	Trhas Teklehaimanot Tesfay	Soltec Iberoamérica	Trhas Teklehaimanot Tesfay	Soltec Iberoamérica
Finland	Anniina Ahtosalo	Uno-X Pro Cycling Team	Anniina Ahtosalo	Uno-X Pro Cycling Team
France	Victoire Berteau	Cofidis	Cédrine Kerbaol	Ceratizit–WNT Pro Cycling
Germany	Liane Lippert	Movistar Team	Mieke Kröger	Human Powered Health
Greece	Argiro Milaki	Denver Disruptors	Argiro Milaki	Denver Disruptors
Guatemala	Jasmin Soto	Macizo-Cordelsa-Don Paletero	Jasmin Soto	Macizo-Cordelsa-Don Paletero
Guyana	Clivecia Spencer	Linden	Denise Jeffrey	
Honduras	Linda Menéndez	Cendema Cemplus Racing Team	Gissel Andino	Prototype-Probike Women Cycling
Hong Kong	Lee Sze Wing	SHKP Supernova Cycling Team	Wing Yee Leung	
Hungary	Blanka Vas	SD Worx	Blanka Vas	SD Worx
Iceland	Hafdís Sigurðardóttir		Hafdís Sigurðardóttir	
India	Swasti Singh	Orissa Cycling Team	Kavita Siyag	Rajasthan Cycling Team
Indonesia	Agustina Delia Priatna			
Iran	Pantea Gholipour		Somayeh Yazdani	
Ireland	Lara Gillespie	UAE Development Team	Kelly Murphy	AWOL O'Shea
Israel	Antonina Reznikov		Rotem Gafinovitz	Hess Cycling Team
Italy	Elisa Longo Borghini	Lidl–Trek	Elisa Longo Borghini	Lidl–Trek
Jamaica	Llori Sharpe	Canyon–SRAM Generation	Llori Sharpe	Canyon–SRAM Generation
Japan	Eri Yonamine	Human Powered Health	Yui Ishida	
Kazakhstan	Makhabbat Umutzhanova	Dubai Police Team	Makhabbat Umutzhanova	Dubai Police Team
Kosovo	Sibora Kadriu		Sibora Kadriu	
Latvia	Anastasia Carbonari	UAE Development Team	Dana Rožlapa	
Lithuania	Olivija Baleišytė	Aromitalia–Basso Bikes–Vaiano	Olivija Baleišytė	Aromitalia–Basso Bikes–Vaiano
Lesotho	Tsepiso Lerata			
Luxembourg	Christine Majerus	SD Worx	Christine Majerus	SD Worx
Malaysia	Nur Aisyah Mohamad Zubir		Siti Nur Adibah Akma Mohd Fuad	
Malta			Marie Claire Aquilina	Team Greens
Mauritius	Aurelie Halbwachs		Aurelie Halbwachs	
Mexico	Belén Garza	Nuevo León	Andrea Ramírez	Bizkaia–Durango
Moldova	Ecaterina Mogîldea		Liubovi Iachimova	
Mongolia	Anujin Jinjiibadam		Solongo Tserenlkham	
Morocco	Chaimae Ez-Zakraoui		Chaimae Ez-Zakraoui	
Namibia	Vera Looser		Melissa Hinz	
Netherlands	Demi Vollering	SD Worx	Riejanne Markus	Team Jumbo–Visma
New Zealand	Ally Wollaston	AG Insurance–Soudal–Quick-Step	Georgia Williams	EF Education–Tibco–SVB
Nicaragua	Maria Elisa Gómez	Team Kilos	Maria Elisa Gómez	Team Kilos
Nigeria	Ese Ukpeseraye			
North Macedonia	Elena Petrova		Elena Petrova	
Norway	Susanne Andersen	Uno-X Pro Cycling Team	Mie Bjørndal Ottestad	Uno-X Pro Cycling Team
Pakistan	Nida Bibi		Rabia Garib	
Panama	Wendy Ducreux	Prototype-Probike Women Cycling	Anibel Prieto	
Paraguay	Agua Marina Espínola	Canyon–SRAM Generation	Agua Marina Espínola	Canyon–SRAM Generation
Philippines	Jermyn Prado		Jermyn Prado	
Poland	Monika Brzezna	MAT Atom Deweloper Wrocław	Agnieszka Skalniak-Sójka	Canyon//SRAM
Portugal	Cristiana Valente		Ana Caramelo	
Puerto Rico			Erialis Otero	Cantabria Deporte–Río Miera
Romania	Georgeta Ungureanu		Manuela Mureșan	Soltec Iberoamérica
Russia	Tamara Dronova	Israel Premier Tech Roland	Tamara Dronova	Israel Premier Tech Roland
Rwanda	Diane Ingabire	Canyon–SRAM Generation	Diane Ingabire	Canyon–SRAM Generation
Serbia	Jelena Erić	Movistar Team	Jelena Erić	Movistar Team
Singapore	Elizabeth Le Min Liau		Shirong Ava Woo	
Slovakia	Nora Jenčušová	Bepink	Nora Jenčušová	Bepink
Slovenia	Urška Pintar	BTC City Ljubljana Scott	Urška Žigart	Team Jayco–AlUla
South Africa	Frances Janse van Rensburg	Stade Rochelais Charente-Maritime	Zanri Rossouw	Team Reach for Rainbows
South Korea	Lee Eun-hee		Lee Ju-mi	
Spain	Mavi García	Liv Racing TeqFind	Mireia Benito	AG Insurance–Soudal–Quick-Step
Sweden	Emilia Fahlin	FDJ–Suez	Jenny Rissveds	Team Coop–Hitec Products
Switzerland	Marlen Reusser	SD Worx	Elena Hartmann	Israel Premier Tech Roland
Thailand	Chaniporn Batriya	Thailand Women's Cycling Team	Chaniporn Batriya	Thailand Women's Cycling Team
Trinidad and Tobago	Alexi Ramirez	Miami Blazers	Alexi Ramirez	Miami Blazers
Turkey	Azize Bekar	Sakarya BB Pro Team	Azize Bekar	Sakarya BB Pro Team
Ukraine	Maryna Altukhova		Valeriya Kononenko	
United Arab Emirates	Safia Al Sayegh	UAE Team ADQ	Shaikha Rashed	
United Kingdom	Pfeiffer Georgi	Team DSM	Lizzie Holden	UAE Team ADQ
United States	Chloé Dygert	Canyon//SRAM	Chloé Dygert	Canyon//SRAM
Uruguay	Johanna Bracco		Mariana García	Pavè D'Amico Women's Cycling Team
Uzbekistan	Yanina Kuskova	7 Saber Uzbekistan Cycling Team	Olga Zabelinskaya	7 Saber Uzbekistan Cycling Team
Venezuela	Lilibeth Chacón	Clarus Merquimia Group - Strongman	Lilibeth Chacón	Clarus Merquimia Group - Strongman
Zimbabwe	Skye Davidson		Skye Davidson	

== U23 national champions ==
Country	Women's U23 Road Race Champion	U23 Road Race Champion's Team	Women's U23 Time Trial Champion	U23 Time Trial Champion's Team
Algeria			Chahra Azzouz	
Australia			Isabelle Carnes	ARA Skip Capital
Austria	Leila Gschwentner	Maxx-Solar Rose Women Racing	Leila Gschwentner	Maxx-Solar Rose Women Racing
Belarus	Alina Korotkina		Ekaterina Rusak	
Belgium			Febe Jooris	AG Insurance–Soudal–Quick-Step
Belize			Paulita Chavarria	
Benin			Charlotte Métoévi	
Brazil			Ana Paula Finco	São José Ciclismo
Canada			Ngaire Barraclough	
China	Yuhang Cui	China Liv Pro Cycling	Yuhang Cui	China Liv Pro Cycling
Costa Rica	Alondra Granados		Alondra Granados	
Cyprus	Demetra Koukouma		Demetra Koukouma	
Dominican Republic			Flor Espiritusanto	
Eritrea			Adiam Dawit	
Finland			Ursula Lindén	Henttala Development Team
Chile	Camila Navarro Vega		Gabriela Alarcón	
Colombia	Stefanía Sánchez	Eneicat CM Team	Gabriela López	Mujeres Antioquia – Orgullo Paisa
Ecuador			Ana Vivar	Movistar–Best PC
Estonia	Elisabeth Ebras	UAE Development Team		
France	Océane Mahé		Églantine Rayer	Team DSM
Germany	Selma Lantzsch	Maxx-Solar Rose Women Racing	Antonia Niedermaier	Canyon//SRAM
Greece	Eirini Maria Karousou		Eirini Maria Karousou	
Guatemala			Dulce Ajpacajá	
Honduras			Linda Menéndez	
Hungary			Petra Zsankó	Massi–Tactic
Israel	Ori Bash Dubinski	Israel Premier Tech Roland Development	Adar Shriki	Roland Le Dévoluy
Luxembourg	Marie Schreiber	SD Worx	Nina Berton	AG Insurance–Soudal–Quick-Step
Malta			Kristina Spiteri	
Morocco			Raja Chakir	
Namibia			Monique du Plessis	Cymot Namibia
New Zealand			Ally Wollaston	AG Insurance–Soudal–Quick-Step
Panama	Kimberly Juliette Wing		Kimberly Juliette Wing	
Poland			Dominika Włodarczyk	ATOM Deweloper Posciellux.pl Wrocław
Portugal	Beatriz Pereira	Bizkaia–Durango	Beatriz Pereira	Bizkaia–Durango
Romania			Maria-Ecaterina Stancu	
Serbia	Bojana Jovanović		Marija Pavlović	
Singapore	Chelsea Yap			
Slovakia	Nora Jenčušová	Bepink	Nora Jenčušová	Bepink
South Africa			Frances Janse van Rensburg	Stade Rochelais Charente-Maritime
Spain			Idoia Eraso	Laboral Kutxa–Fundación Euskadi
Switzerland	Linda Zanetti	UAE Development Team	Noemi Rüegg	Visma–Lease a Bike
Ukraine	Tetiana Yashchenko		Tetiana Yashchenko	
United Kingdom			Maddie Leech	
United States			Betty Hasse	CCB – Alpine Carbon p/b Levine Law Group Women's Cycling
Uruguay	Luciana Wynants		Luciana Wynants	

== Junior National Champions ==
Country	Women's Junior Road Race Champion	Junior Road Race Champion's Team	Women's Junior Time Trial Champion	Junior Time Trial Champion's Team
Argentina	Katia Fernández		Eliana Tocha	
Australia	Felicity Wilson-Haffenden	Team BridgeLane	Felicity Wilson-Haffenden	Team BridgeLane
Austria			Tabea Huys	
Belarus	Polina Konrad		Polina Konrad	
Belgium	Hélène Hesters	Van Moer Logistics Cycling Team	Luca Vierstraete	
Belize	Gabrielle Gabourel		Gabrielle Gabourel	
Benin	Melvina Tankpinou		Melvina Tankpinou	
Bermuda	Annabelle Miller		Annabelle Miller	
Bolivia	Nayeli Castillo		Jazel Mamani	
Bosnia and Herzegovina	Maja Subotić			
Brazil	Catharine Ehrmann Vieira		Catharine Ehrmann Vieira	
Bulgaria	Gergana Stoyanova		Gergana Stoyanova	
Canada	Alexandra Volstad		Nora Linton	
Chile	Maite Ibarra		Maite Ibarra	
Costa Rica	Isabel García	Colono Construcción Bike Station Clips	Sofía Quirós	Asfaltos CBZ
Cyprus	Chrysovalanto Solonos		Chrysovalanto Solonos	
Czech Republic	Adéla Pernická		Nela Kaňkovská	
Denmark	Ida Krickau Ketelsen		Alberte Greve	
Dominican Republic	Melsey Yamely Perez			
Ecuador	Heidi Flores	Team Banco Guayaquil–Ecuador	Camila Salomé Vega	Movistar–Best PC
Estonia	Liisi Lohk	Pärnu Kalev Spordikool	Liisi Lohk	Pärnu Kalev Spordikool
Finland	Erika Ingves		Viivi Turpeinen	
France	Léane Tabu		Léane Tabu	
Germany	Hannah Kunz		Hannah Kunz	
Greece	Vasiliki Kokkali		Vasiliki Kokkali	
Guatemala	Jessica Nicho		Jasmin Puac	
Hong Kong	Guardiola Cheung Li-tong			
Hungary			Réka Tóth	
Iceland			Sigríður Dóra Guðmundsdóttir	
India	Apurva Gore		Maya Dudi	
Iran	Fatemeh Dadgar		Elika Yousefi	
Ireland	Lucy Benezet Minns		Lucy Benezet Minns	
Israel	Noa Shweky		Maayan Tal	
Italy	Federica Venturelli		Alice Toniolli	
Kazakhstan	Yelizaveta Sklyarova		Yelizaveta Sklyarova	
Latvia	Rūta Zibene		Beāte Bula	
Lithuania	Skaistė Mikašauskaitė		Skaistė Mikašauskaitė	
Lesotho	Pontso Makatile			
Luxembourg	Gwen Nothum		Gwen Nothum	
Malaysia	Intan Suraya Tokiman		Dahlia Hazwani Hasyim	
Morocco			Yasmine Bouchiha	
Namibia	Eden Spangenberg		Angela Kamati	
Netherlands	Puck Langenbarg		Fee Knaven	AG Insurance–Soudal–Quick-Step U19
New Zealand	Georgia Simpson		Muireann Green	Black Magic Women's Cycling
Norway	Kamilla Aasebø		Ina Nakken	Mix Doltcini Watersley Cycling Team
Panama	Abigail Morán		Abigail Morán	
Paraguay	Letícia Da Veiga		Letícia Da Veiga	
Philippines			Kim Syrel Bonilla	
Poland	Maria Klamut		Martyna Szczęsna	
Portugal	Daniela Simão		Rita Tanganho	
Romania	Iuliana-Alexandra Cioclu		Iuliana-Alexandra Cioclu	
Rwanda	Mariata Byukusenge		Aline Uwera	
Serbia	Dunja Čobanović		Dunja Čobanović	
Slovakia	Terézia Ciriaková		Anna Ržoncová	CK EPIC Dohňany
Slovenia	Ema Podberšič		Ema Podberšič	
South Africa	Anika Visser		Jessie Munton	
Spain	Laia Bosch		Julia Ellen Murphy	
Sweden	Stina Kagevi		Stina Kagevi	
Switzerland	Aline Epp		Kyra Reichmuth	
Thailand	Suphannika Chantorn		Natcha Songkhen	
Trinidad and Tobago	Ashleigh Thomas		Ashleigh Thomas	
Turkey	Semanur Kırış		Sudenur Satıcı	
Ukraine	Valeria Ponomorenko		Yuliia Pchelintseva	
United Kingdom	Amelia Cebak		Cat Ferguson	
United States	Samantha Scott		Samantha Scott	
Uruguay	Florencia Revetria		Florencia Revetria	
Venezuela	Valeria Becerra		Daniela Moncada	
Vietnam	Thạch Thị Ngọc Thảo		Nguyễn Thị Bé Hồng	
Zimbabwe	Jessica Fuller		Jessica Fuller	

=== Champions in UCI Women's teams ===
UCI Women's WorldTeams
Team	Road Race Champions	Time Trial Champions
Canyon//SRAM	Chloé Dygert (USA)	Agnieszka Skalniak-Sójka (POL); Chloé Dygert (USA)
EF Education–Tibco–SVB	Alison Jackson (CAN)	Georgia Williams (NZL)
Fenix–Deceuninck		
FDJ United–Suez	Emilia Fahlin (SWE)	
Human Powered Health	Antri Christoforou (CYP); Eri Yonamine (JPN)	Antri Christoforou (CYP); Mieke Kröger (GER)
Lidl–Trek	Brodie Chapman (AUS); Elisa Longo Borghini (ITA)	Elisa Longo Borghini (ITA)
Liv Racing TeqFind	Mavi García (ESP)	
Movistar Team	Arlenis Sierra (CUB); Liane Lippert (GER); Jelena Erić (SRB)	Arlenis Sierra (CUB); Emma Norsgaard (DEN); Jelena Erić (SRB)
Israel Premier Tech Roland	Tamara Dronova (RUS)	Anna Kiesenhofer (AUT); Tamara Dronova (RUS); Elena Hartmann (SUI)
SD Worx	Lotte Kopecky (BEL); Blanka Vas (HUN); Christine Majerus (LUX); Demi Vollering (NED); Marlen Reusser (SUI)	Lotte Kopecky (BEL); Blanka Vas (HUN); Christine Majerus (LUX)
Team Jayco–AlUla		Urška Žigart (SLO)
Team DSM	Pfeiffer Georgi (GBR)	
Team Jumbo–Visma		Riejanne Markus (NED)
UAE Team ADQ	Safia Al Sayegh (UAE)	Lizzie Holden (GBR)
Uno-X Pro Cycling Team	Rebecca Koerner (DEN); Anniina Ahtosalo (FIN); Susanne Andersen (NOR)	Anniina Ahtosalo (FIN); Mie Bjørndal Ottestad (NOR)

UCI Women's Continental Teams
Team	Road Race Champions	Time Trial Champions
AG Insurance–Soudal–Quick-Step	Ally Wollaston (NZL)	Mireia Benito (ESP)
ARA Skip Capital		
Arkéa Pro Cycling Team		Grace Brown (AUS)
Aromitalia–Basso Bikes–Vaiano	Olivija Baleišytė (LTU)	Olivija Baleišytė (LTU)
MAT Atom Deweloper Wrocław	Monika Brzezna (POL)	
O'Shea Redchilli Bikes		Kelly Murphy (IRL)
Bepink	Nora Jenčušová (SVK)	Nora Jenčušová (SVK)
Chevalmeire		
Bizkaia–Durango	Ana Vitória Magalhães (BRA)	Andrea Ramírez (MEX)
BTC City Ljubljana Zhiraf Ambedo		
BTC City Ljubljana Scott	Urška Pintar (SLO)	
DAS–Hutchinson		
Cantabria Deporte–Río Miera		Erialis Otero (PUR)
Canyon–SRAM Generation	Llori Sharpe (JAM); Agua Marina Espínola (PAR); Diane Ingabire (RWA)	Llori Sharpe (JAM); Agua Marina Espínola (PAR); Diane Ingabire (RWA)
Ceratizit–WNT Pro Cycling		Cédrine Kerbaol (FRA)
China Liv Pro Cycling		
Cofidis	Victoire Berteau (FRA)	
Cynisca Cycling		
DNA Pro Cycling	Diana Peñuela (COL)	
Emotional.fr–Tornatech–GSC Blagnac		
Eneicat–CMTeam–Seguros Deportivos		Aranza Villalón (CHI)
Team Farto–BTC Women's Cycling Team		
Fenix-Deceuninck Continental	Carina Schrempf (AUT)	
A.S.D. K2 Women Team		
GT Krush Rebellease Pro Cycling		
InstaFund Racing		
Isolmant–Premac–Vittoria		
Israel Premier Tech Roland Development		
Laboral Kutxa–Fundación Euskadi		
Li-Ning Star		
Lifeplus Wahoo		
Lotto–Dstny Ladies		
Massi–Tactic		Miryam Núñez (ECU)
Maxx-Solar Rose Women Racing		
VolkerWessels Women Cyclingteam		
Primeau Vélo Racing Team		
Proximus-Alphamotorhomes-Doltcini		
Boneshaker Project presented by ROXO		
Servetto–Makhymo–Beltrami TSA		
Soltec Iberoamérica	Trhas Teklehaimanot Tesfay (ETH)	Manuela Mureșan (ROM); Trhas Teklehaimanot Tesfay (ETH)
Sopela Women's Team		
St. Michel–Preference Home–Auber93		
Stade Rochelais Charente-Maritime	Frances Janse van Rensburg (RSA)	
7 Saber Uzbekistan Cycling Team	Yanina Kuskova (UZB)	Olga Zabelinskaya (UZB)
Team BridgeLane		
Team Coop–Hitec Products		Jenny Rissveds (SWE)
Team Groupe Abadie		
Team Abadie-Magnan		Fernanda Yapura (ARG)
Team Mendelspeck E-Work		
Thailand Women's Cycling Team	Chaniporn Batriya (THA)	Chaniporn Batriya (THA)
Top Girls Fassa Bortolo		
Torelli		
UAE Development Team	Anastasia Carbonari (LAT); Lara Gillespie (IRL)	
Virginia's Blue Ridge–Twenty28		
WCC Team		
Zaaf Cycling Team	Ebtissam Mohamed (EGY)	Ebtissam Mohamed (EGY)
