= 2023 Tour of Chongming Island =

2023 UCI Women's World Tour, race 26 of 27

Race details
- Dates: 12–14 October 2023
- Stages: 3
- Distance: 349.8 km (217.4 mi)
- Winning time: 8h 40' 21"

Results
Jersey awarded to the overall winner	Winner	Chiara Consonni (ITA)	(UAE Team ADQ)
	Second	Mylène de Zoete (NED)	(Ceratizit–WNT Pro Cycling)
	Third	Daria Pikulik (POL)	(Human Powered Health)
Jersey awarded to the points classification winner	Points	Chiara Consonni (ITA)	(UAE Team ADQ)
Jersey awarded to the mountains classification winner	Mountains	Hanna Tserakh (ANA)	(Li-Ning Star)
Jersey awarded to the youth classification winner	Youth	Tang Xin (CHN)	(China)
	Team	(Switzerland) Israel Premier Tech Roland	

The 2023 Tour of Chongming Island was the fourteenth staging of the Tour of Chongming Island, a women's stage race held in Shanghai, China. It ran from 12 to 14 October 2023, as the 26th and penultimate event of the 2023 UCI Women's World Tour. The race included 3 stages, covering a total of 349.8 km.

== Teams ==
UCI Women's WorldTeams

- FDJ–Suez
- UAE Team ADQ
- Uno-X Pro Cycling Team
- Israel Premier Tech Roland
- Team Jayco–AlUla
- Human Powered Health
- Liv Racing TeqFind

UCI Women's Continental Teams

- Ceratizit–WNT Pro Cycling
- Team Coop–Hitec Products
- ARA Skip Capital
- Duolar-Chevalmeire
- Tashkent City Women Professional Cycling Team
- Team Dukla Praha
- China Liv Pro Cycling
- Hebei Women Continental Team (Note: Team only existed for one year according to ProCyclingStats. UCI team code: HEC.)
- Li-Ning Star

National teams

- China
- Hong Kong

== Stages overview ==
Stage	Date	Start	Finish	Profile	Distance	Winner	General classification leader
1	12 October	Chongming	Chongming	Flat stage	108.9 km (67.7 mi)	Mylène de Zoete (NED)	Mylène de Zoete (NED)
2	13 October	Changxing	Chongming	Flat stage	128.6 km (79.9 mi)	Hanna Tserakh (ANA)	Hanna Tserakh (ANA)
3	14 October	Chongming	Chongming	Flat stage	112.3 km (69.8 mi)	Chiara Consonni (ITA)	Chiara Consonni (ITA)

== Stages ==
=== Stage 1 ===
12 October 2023 — Chongming New City Park to Chongming New City Park, 108.9 km (67.7 mi)

Stage 1 Result (1–10)
Rank	Rider	Team	Time
1	Mylène de Zoete (NED)	Ceratizit–WNT Pro Cycling	2h 34' 47"
2	Georgia Baker (AUS)	Team Jayco–AlUla	+ 0"
3	Daria Pikulik (POL)	Human Powered Health	+ 0"
4	Chiara Consonni (ITA)	UAE Team ADQ	+ 0"
5	Martina Fidanza (ITA)	Ceratizit–WNT Pro Cycling	+ 0"
6	Zeng Luyao (CHN)	China	+ 0"
7	Rachele Barbieri (ITA)	Liv Racing TeqFind	+ 0"
8	Mia Griffin (IRL)	Israel Premier Tech Roland	+ 0"
9	Georgia Danford (NZL)	Hitec Products–Fluid Control	+ 0"
10	Maggie Coles-Lyster (CAN)	Israel Premier Tech Roland	+ 0"

General classification after Stage 1 (1–10)
Rank	Rider	Team	Time
1	Mylène de Zoete (NED)	Ceratizit–WNT Pro Cycling	2h 34' 37"
2	Georgia Baker (AUS)	Team Jayco–AlUla	+ 4"
3	Daria Pikulik (POL)	Human Powered Health	+ 6"
4	Chiara Consonni (ITA)	UAE Team ADQ	+ 7"
5	Tang Xin (CHN)	China	+ 7"
6	Vittoria Guazzini (ITA)	FDJ–Suez	+ 8"
7	Talsa Naskovich (ANA)	Li-Ning Star	+ 8"
8	Hanna Tserakh (ANA)	Li-Ning Star	+ 9"
9	Tiril Jørgensen (NOR)	Team Coop–Hitec Products	+ 9"
10	Martina Fidanza (ITA)	Ceratizit–WNT Pro Cycling	+ 10"

=== Stage 2 ===
13 October 2023 — Shanghai Changxing Island Country Park to Chongming New City Park, 128.6 km (79.9 mi)

Stage 2 Result (1–10)
Rank	Rider	Team	Time
1	Hanna Tserakh (ANA)	Li-Ning Star	3h 18' 11"
2	Martina Fidanza (ITA)	Ceratizit–WNT Pro Cycling	+ 0"
3	Chiara Consonni (ITA)	UAE Team ADQ	+ 0"
4	Maggie Coles-Lyster (CAN)	Israel Premier Tech Roland	+ 0"
5	Emilia Fahlin (SWE)	FDJ–Suez	+ 0"
6	Tang Xin (CHN)	China	+ 0"
7	Zeng Luyao (CHN)	China	+ 0"
8	Danique Braam (NED)	Duolar-Chevalmeire	+ 0"
9	Georgia Baker (AUS)	Team Jayco–AlUla	+ 0"
10	Anniina Ahtosalo (FIN)	Uno-X Pro Cycling Team	+ 0"

General classification after Stage 2 (1–10)
Rank	Rider	Team	Time
1	Hanna Tserakh (ANA)	Li-Ning Star	5h 52' 47"
2	Mylène de Zoete (NED)	Ceratizit–WNT Pro Cycling	+ 1"
3	Chiara Consonni (ITA)	UAE Team ADQ	+ 2"
4	Daria Pikulik (POL)	Human Powered Health	+ 4"
5	Martina Fidanza (ITA)	Ceratizit–WNT Pro Cycling	+ 5"
6	Georgia Baker (AUS)	Team Jayco–AlUla	+ 5"
7	Olga Zabelinskaya (UZB)	Tashkent City Women Professional Cycling Team	+ 5"
8	Tang Xin (CHN)	China	+ 8"
9	Vittoria Guazzini (ITA)	FDJ–Suez	+ 9"
10	Talsa Naskovich (ANA)	Li-Ning Star	+ 9"

=== Stage 3 ===
14 October 2023 — Chongming New City Park to Chongming New City Park, 112.3 km (69.8 mi)

Stage 3 results (1–10)
Rank	Rider	Team	Time
1	Chiara Consonni (ITA)	UAE Team ADQ	2h 47' 47"
2	Daria Pikulik (POL)	Human Powered Health	+ 0"
3	Martina Fidanza (ITA)	Ceratizit–WNT Pro Cycling	+ 0"
4	Anniina Ahtosalo (FIN)	Uno-X Pro Cycling Team	+ 0"
5	Maggie Coles-Lyster (CAN)	Israel Premier Tech Roland	+ 0"
6	Rachele Barbieri (ITA)	Liv Racing TeqFind	+ 0"
7	Hanna Tserakh (ANA)	Li-Ning Star	+ 0"
8	Elena Pirrone (ITA)	Israel Premier Tech Roland	+ 0"
9	Mylène de Zoete (NED)	Ceratizit–WNT Pro Cycling	+ 0"
10	Zeng Luyao (CHN)	China	+ 0"

General classification after Stage 3 (1–10)
Rank	Rider	Team	Time
1	Chiara Consonni (ITA)	UAE Team ADQ	8h 40' 21"
2	Mylène de Zoete (NED)	Ceratizit–WNT Pro Cycling	+ 9"
3	Daria Pikulik (POL)	Human Powered Health	+ 10"
4	Hanna Tserakh (ANA)	Li-Ning Star	+ 13"
5	Martina Fidanza (ITA)	Ceratizit–WNT Pro Cycling	+ 14"
6	Georgia Baker (AUS)	Team Jayco–AlUla	+ 18"
7	Olga Zabelinskaya (UZB)	Tashkent City Women Professional Cycling Team	+ 18"
8	Tang Xin (CHN)	China	+ 20"
9	Maggie Coles-Lyster (CAN)	Israel Premier Tech Roland	+ 21"
10	Anniina Ahtosalo (FIN)	Uno-X Pro Cycling Team	+ 21"

== Classification leadership table ==
Classification leadership by stage
Stage	Winner	General classification	Points classification	Mountains classification	Young rider classification	Team classification
1	Mylène de Zoete	Mylène de Zoete	Mylène de Zoete	Nina Kessler	Tang Xin	Israel Premier Tech Roland
2	Hanna Tserakh	Hanna Tserakh	Chiara Consonni	Nina Kessler	Tang Xin	Israel Premier Tech Roland
3	Chiara Consonni	Chiara Consonni	Chiara Consonni	Hanna Tserakh	Tang Xin	Israel Premier Tech Roland
Final		Chiara Consonni	Chiara Consonni	Hanna Tserakh	Tang Xin	Israel Premier Tech Roland

== Classification standings ==
Legend
Denotes the winner of the general classification	Denotes the winner of the young rider classification
Denotes the winner of the points classification	Denotes the winner of the mountains classification

=== General classification ===
Final general classification (1–10)
Rank	Rider	Team	Time
1	Chiara Consonni (ITA)	UAE Team ADQ	8h 40' 21"
2	Mylène de Zoete (NED)	Ceratizit–WNT Pro Cycling	+ 9"
3	Daria Pikulik (POL)	Human Powered Health	+ 10"
4	Hanna Tserakh (ANA)	Li-Ning Star	+ 13"
5	Martina Fidanza (ITA)	Ceratizit–WNT Pro Cycling	+ 14"
6	Georgia Baker (AUS)	Team Jayco–AlUla	+ 18"
7	Olga Zabelinskaya (UZB)	Tashkent City Women Professional Cycling Team	+ 18"
8	Tang Xin (CHN)	China	+ 20"
9	Maggie Coles-Lyster (CAN)	Israel Premier Tech Roland	+ 21"
10	Anniina Ahtosalo (FIN)	Uno-X Pro Cycling Team	+ 21"

=== Points classification ===
Final points classification (1–10)
Rank	Rider	Team	Points
1	Chiara Consonni (ITA)	UAE Team ADQ	48
2	Martina Fidanza (ITA)	Ceratizit–WNT Pro Cycling	28
3	Daria Pikulik (POL)	Human Powered Health	27
4	Mylène de Zoete (NED)	Ceratizit–WNT Pro Cycling	24
5	Maggie Coles-Lyster (CAN)	Israel Premier Tech Roland	20
6	Hanna Tserakh (ANA)	Li-Ning Star	19
7	Georgia Baker (AUS)	Team Jayco–AlUla	14
8	Anniina Ahtosalo (FIN)	Uno-X Pro Cycling Team	13
9	Tang Xin (CHN)	China	11
10	Olga Zabelinskaya (UZB)	Tashkent City Women Professional Cycling Team	10

=== Mountains classification ===
Final mountains classification (1–10)
Rank	Rider	Team	Points
1	Hanna Tserakh (ANA)	Li-Ning Star	1
2	Nina Kessler (NED)	Team Jayco–AlUla	1
3	Laura Tomasi (ITA)	UAE Team ADQ	1

=== Young rider classification ===
Final young rider classification (1–10)
Rank	Rider	Team	Time
1	Tang Xin (CHN)	China	8h 40' 41"
2	Anniina Ahtosalo (FIN)	Uno-X Pro Cycling Team	+ 1"
3	Josie Nelson (GBR)	Team Coop–Hitec Products	+ 3"
4	Gabriela Bartova (CZE)	Team Dukla Praha	+ 4"
5	Barbora Nemcova (CZE)	Team Dukla Praha	+ 4"
6	Wilma Olausson (SWE)	Uno-X Pro Cycling Team	+ 4"
7	Sofiya Karimova (UZB)	Tashkent City Women Professional Cycling Team	+ 4"
8	Nela Slanikova (CZE)	Team Dukla Praha	+ 4"
9	Iryna Chuyankova (ANA)	Li-Ning Star	+ 4"
10	Yanina Kuskova (UZB)	Tashkent City Women Professional Cycling Team	+ 4"

=== Team classification ===
Final team classification (1–10)
Rank	Team	Time
1	(Switzerland) Israel Premier Tech Roland	26h 02' 15"
2	(Czech Republic) Team Dukla Praha	+ 0"
3	(France) FDJ–Suez	+ 0"
4	(Germany) Ceratizit–WNT Pro Cycling	+ 0"
5	(Norway) Uno-X Pro Cycling Team	+ 0"
6	(China) Li-Ning Star	+ 0"
7	(Norway) Team Coop–Hitec Products	+ 0"
8	(United Arab Emirates) UAE Team ADQ	+ 0"
9	(Netherlands) Liv Racing TeqFind	+ 0"
10	(Belgium) Duolar-Chevalmeire	+ 0"
