= 2024 Tour de France Femmes =

Women's cycling race

2024 UCI Women's World Tour, race 22 of 27
- Route of the 2024 Tour de France Femmes

Race details
- Dates: 12–18 August
- Stages: 8
- Distance: 949.7 km (590.1 mi)
- Winning time: 24h 36' 07"

Results
Jersey awarded to the overall winner	Winner	Katarzyna Niewiadoma (POL)	(Canyon//SRAM)
	Second	Demi Vollering (NED)	(Team SD Worx–Protime)
	Third	Pauliena Rooijakkers (NED)	(Fenix–Deceuninck)
Jersey awarded to the points classification winner	Points	Marianne Vos (NED)	(Visma–Lease a Bike)
Jersey awarded to the mountains classification winner	Mountains	Justine Ghekiere (BEL)	(AG Insurance–Soudal)
Jersey awarded to the young rider classification winner	Young rider	Puck Pieterse (NED)	(Fenix–Deceuninck)
Jersey awarded to the combativity classification winner	Combativity	Demi Vollering (NED)	(Team SD Worx–Protime)
Jersey awarded to the team classification winner	Team	(United States) Lidl–Trek	

The 2024 Tour de France Femmes (officially 2024 Tour de France Femmes Avec Zwift) was the third edition of the Tour de France Femmes. The race took place from 12 to 18 August and was the 22nd event of the 2024 UCI Women's World Tour calendar. The race was organised by the Amaury Sport Organization (ASO), which also organises the men's Tour de France.

The race was won by Polish rider Katarzyna Niewiadoma (Canyon//SRAM), beating defending champion Demi Vollering (Team SD Worx–Protime) by just four seconds. As well as taking second place, Vollering took the super-combativity award for the most combative rider. Pauliena Rooijakkers (Fenix–Deceuninck) took third place overall after her strong performance on the final stage.

In the race's other classifications, Marianne Vos (Visma–Lease a Bike) won the green jersey of the points classification for the second time. Justine Ghekiere (AG Insurance–Soudal) took the polka-dot jersey as the winner of the mountains classification. Puck Pieterse (Fenix–Deceuninck) took the white jersey as the winner of the young riders classification, which was awarded to the best-placed rider under the age of 23. Lidl–Trek won the team classification as the team with the lowest aggregate time among their three best-placed riders.

Overall, the race was praised by the public, media, teams and riders. Cycling Weekly noted that the "razor-thin" margin of victory demonstrated the "extraordinary level of competition in women's cycling and the depth of talent in the field," while Le Parisien considered that the race had "offered itself some guarantees for the future".

== Teams ==
Twenty-two teams took part in the race. The teams were announced on 24 April 2024. All 15 UCI Women's WorldTeams were automatically invited. They were joined by seven UCI Women's Continental Teams – the two best 2023 UCI Women's Continental Teams (Cofidis Women Team and Tashkent City Women Professional Cycling Team) received an automatic invitation, and the other five teams were selected by ASO, the organisers of the Tour. A total of 154 riders from 30 nationalities started the race, with the Netherlands having the largest contingent (32 riders).

UCI Women's WorldTeams

- AG Insurance–Soudal
- Canyon//SRAM
- Ceratizit–WNT Pro Cycling
- FDJ–Suez
- Fenix–Deceuninck
- Human Powered Health
- Lidl–Trek
- Liv AlUla Jayco
- Movistar Team
- Roland
- Team dsm–firmenich PostNL
- Team SD Worx–Protime
- UAE Team ADQ
- Visma–Lease a Bike
- Uno-X Mobility

UCI Women's Continental Teams

- Arkéa–B&B Hotels Women
- Cofidis
- EF–Oatly–Cannondale
- Laboral Kutxa–Fundación Euskadi
- Lotto–Dstny Ladies
- St. Michel–Mavic–Auber93
- Tashkent City Women Professional Cycling Team

== Route ==
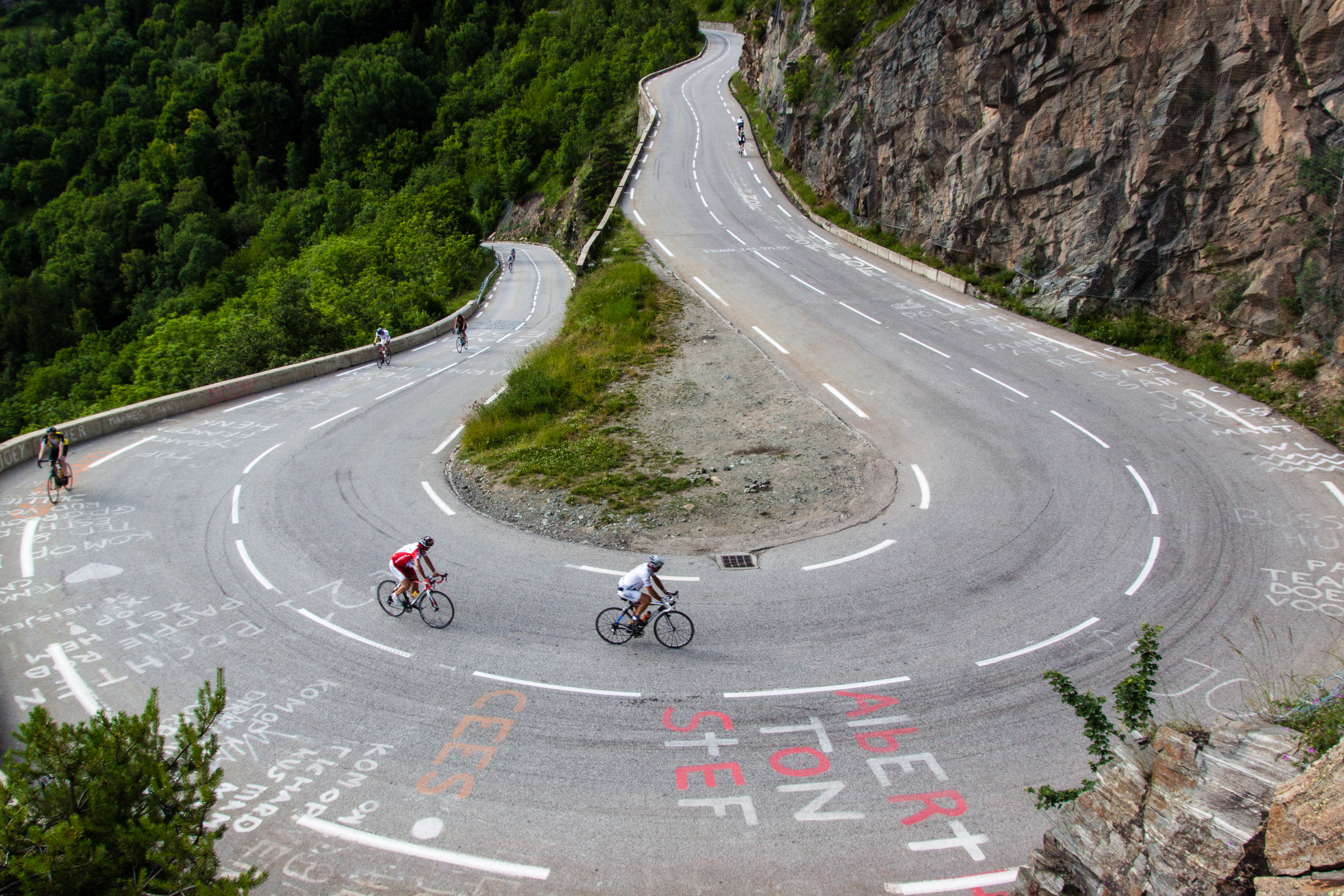
Stage 8 finished at the top of Alpe d'Huez; 13.8 km (8.6 mi) long, which has an average gradient of 7.9% and features 21 hairpin turns.

Due to the Paris 2024 Summer Olympics taking place immediately after the 2024 Tour de France, the 2024 edition did not take place immediately after the men's tour. Instead, it took place in the short gap between the Olympic Games and the 2024 Summer Paralympics in mid-August.

In July 2023, it was announced that the Tour de France Femmes would have its first Grand Départ outside France—with three stage starts in the Netherlands, starting in Rotterdam. It was rumoured that the race would have a summit finish on Alpe d'Huez, with Cycling News noting that race organisers ASO seemed "keen to include at least one very famous climb" in each edition of the race.

In October 2023, the full route was announced by race director Marion Rousse. It comprised seven days of racing with eight stages, covering a total of 946 kilometres (588 mi). The first three stages took place in the Netherlands, with two stages taking place on 13 August, a shorter stage followed by an individual time trial. The race headed south towards Belgium using roads used by other classic cycling races such as the Amstel Gold Race and Liège–Bastogne–Liège. Entering France, the race continued south heading towards the two final stages in the Alps, with the race culminating with a summit finish at Alpe d'Huez at an elevation of 1,850 m (6,070 ft). Alpe d'Huez was last featured in a professional women's race in the 1993 Tour Cycliste Féminin.

Global Cycling Network stated that the route seemed "practically tailor-made for the strengths, preferences and origins" of defending champion Demi Vollering. Vollering welcomed the route, noting the stages in her home country of the Netherlands and stating that she "always wanted to ride Alpe d'Huez". L'Équipe considered that the race would be decided on the final stage, with British national champion Pfeiffer Georgi calling the ascent "brutal".

Stage characteristics
Stage	Date	Course	Distance	Type	Winner
1	12 August	Rotterdam to The Hague (Netherlands)	123 km (76 mi)	Flat stage	Charlotte Kool (NED)
2	13 August	Dordrecht to Rotterdam (Netherlands)	69.7 km (43.3 mi)	Flat stage	Charlotte Kool (NED)
3	13 August	Rotterdam (Netherlands)	6.3 km (3.9 mi)	Individual time trial	Demi Vollering (NED)
4	14 August	Valkenburg (Netherlands) to Liège (Belgium)	122.7 km (76.2 mi)	Hilly stage	Puck Pieterse (NED)
5	15 August	Bastogne (Belgium) to Amnéville	152.5 km (94.8 mi)	Flat stage	Blanka Vas (HUN)
6	16 August	Remiremont to Morteau	159.2 km (98.9 mi)	Hilly stage	Cédrine Kerbaol (FRA)
7	17 August	Champagnole to Le Grand-Bornand	166.4 km (103.4 mi)	Mountain stage	Justine Ghekiere (BEL)
8	18 August	Le Grand-Bornand to Alpe d'Huez	149.9 km (93.1 mi)	Mountain stage	Demi Vollering (NED)
Total			949.7 km (590.1 mi)		

== Race overview ==
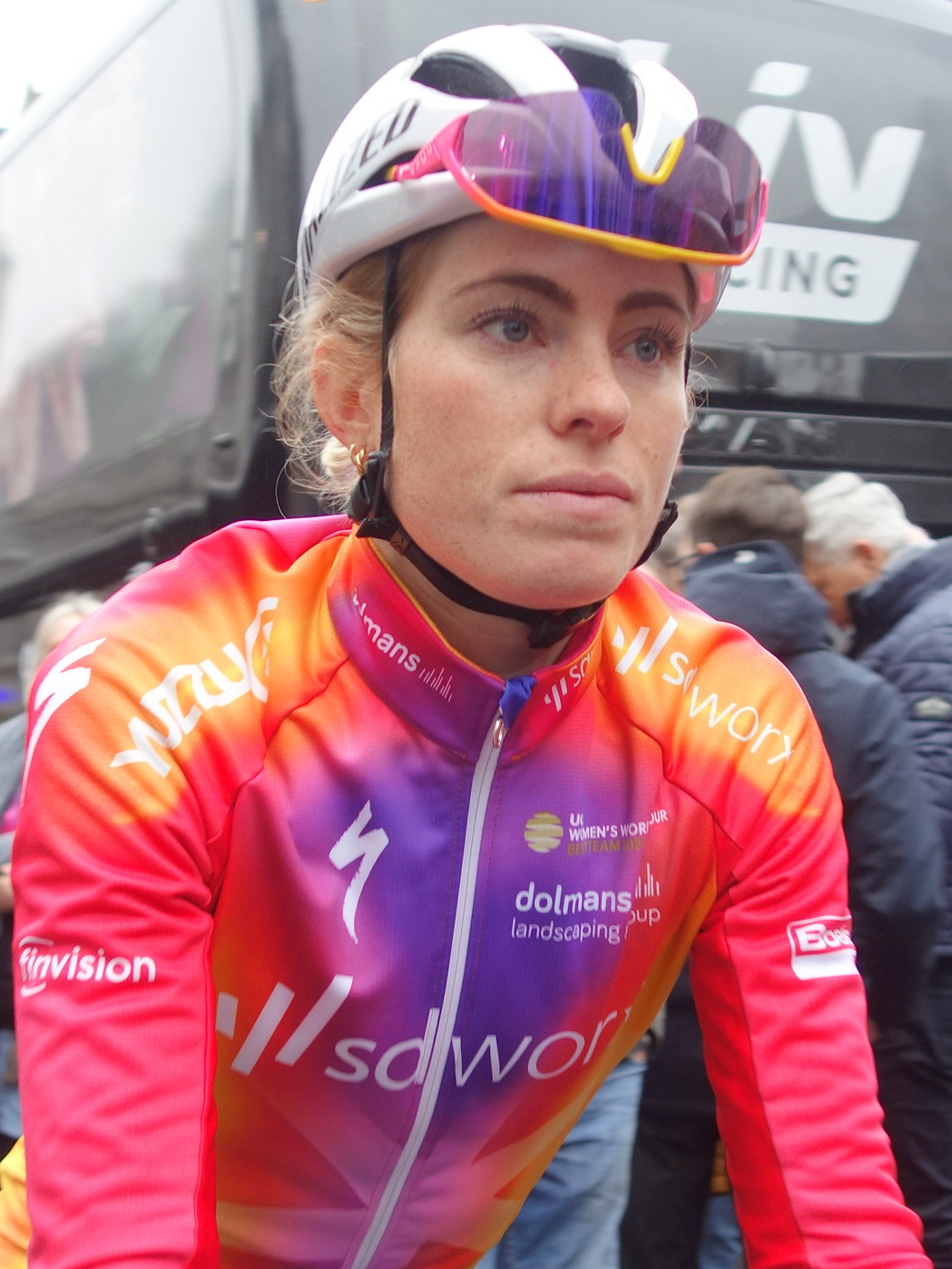
Demi Vollering was considered to be favourite for the general classification (GC)

Ahead of the race, defending champion Demi Vollering was considered to be the pre-race favourite for the general classification (GC), following Vollering's victories at La Vuelta Femenina and other stage races in 2024. Other contenders tipped for the general classification (GC) included Katarzyna Niewiadoma, Juliette Labous, Évita Muzic and Riejanne Markus. Potential GC contender Elisa Longo Borghini would not take part in the race following a training crash earlier in August.

Lorena Wiebes, Marianne Vos and Charlotte Kool were considered favourites for the points classification for best sprinter, with Vollering and Niewiadoma tipped for the Queen of the Mountains (QoM) classification. Shirin van Anrooij and Neve Bradbury were considered favourites for the young rider classification for best rider under the age of 23, and SD Worx were considered favourites for the team classification.

Overall, the field of 154 riders had 18 of the top 20 riders in the world taking part – with Chiara Consonni and 2023 points classification winner Lotte Kopecky having skipped the Tour to focus on the Olympic Games. Media coverage prior to the event was positive, with anticipation of the summit finish at the Alpe d'Huez and the Grand Départ in the Netherlands. The prize fund remained at €250,000 (compared to €2.5 million for the men's tour), with €50,000 for the winner of the general classification – making it one of the richest races in women's cycling.

=== Grand Départ in the Netherlands ===
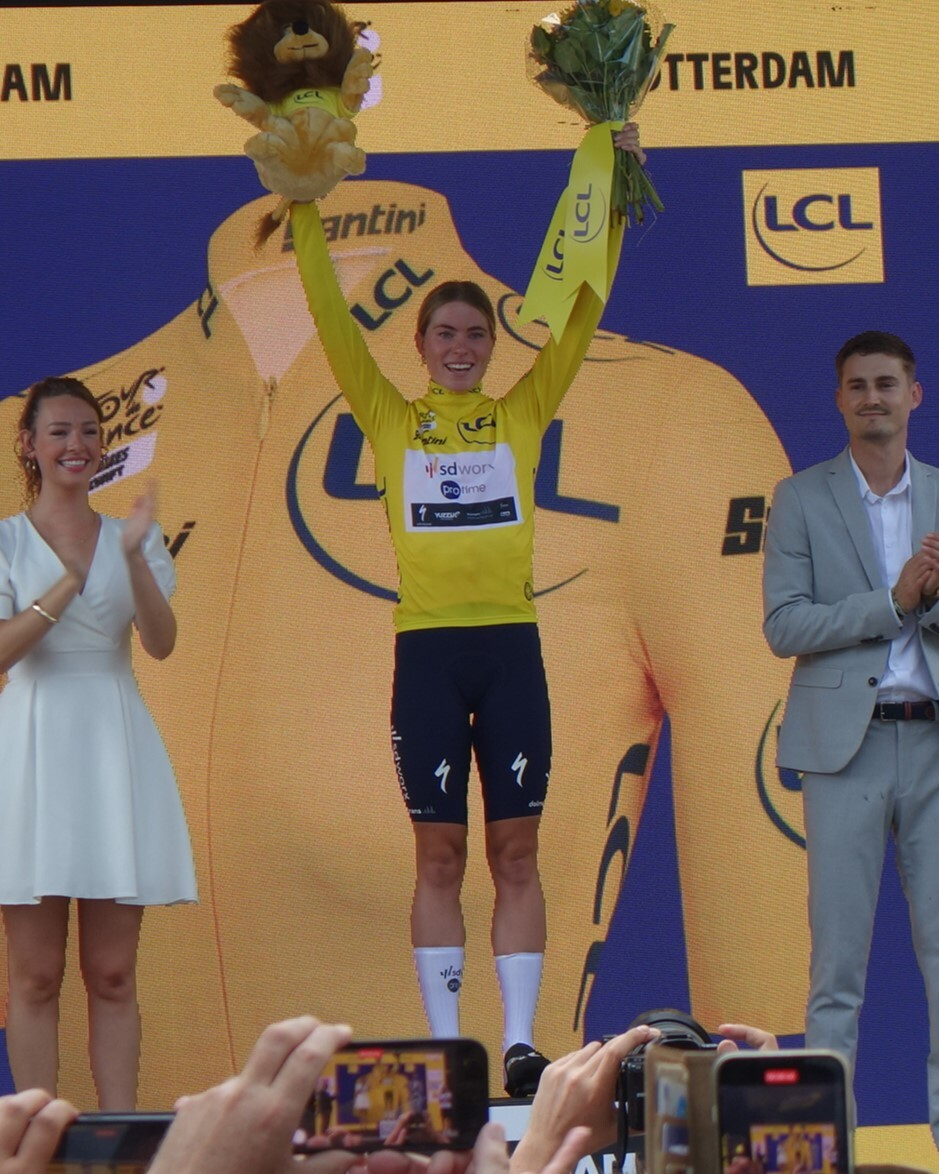
Vollering in the yellow jersey following her win on stage 3

The opening three stages took place in and around Rotterdam in the Netherlands. Stage 1 of the Tour took place on 12 August, with a flat course to The Hague. In a bunch sprint finish, Kool (Team dsm–firmenich PostNL) won the stage, after favourite for the stage win Wiebes (Team SD Worx–Protime) suffered a mechanical issue with her derailleur, meaning that she was unable to sprint for the line. Kool therefore took the first yellow jersey of the race, as well as the green jersey of the points classification. The Tashkent City Women Professional Cycling Team were criticised for its poor performance, with four of their riders abandoning the race after they were unable to keep with the pace of the peloton on the flat stage.

Stage 2 was a short, flat stage taking place on the morning of 13 August, with stage 3 taking place in the afternoon. After nervous racing throughout the stage, Kool beat Wiebes in a sprint finish – with the bonus seconds available at the finish extending Kool's lead in the GC to 14 seconds, and maintaining her lead in the points classification.

Stage 3 was a 6.3 km (3.9 mi) individual time trial in central Rotterdam. Loes Adegeest (FDJ–Suez) set a fast time of 7 min 30 s, with Dutch favourite Ellen van Dijk (Lidl–Trek) and double Olympic champion Kristen Faulkner (EF–Oatly–Cannondale) both setting times a second slower. Olympic time trial champion Grace Brown (FDJ–Suez) suffered a puncture, losing around 30 seconds as the short course allowed no time to catch up. Chloé Dygert (Canyon//SRAM) then set a slightly faster time than Adegeest, with Vollering (Team SD Worx–Protime) then setting a time five seconds quicker. Wearing the yellow jersey, Kool set a time of 7 min 50 s – thereby falling to 33rd overall, but retaining her lead in the points classification. Vollering therefore took the lead in GC, just three seconds ahead of Wiebes and five ahead of Dygert. Vollering was delighted with her stage win, tearily stating that she "really didn't see this coming".

=== Heading south into France ===
Stage 4 was a hilly route heading south from Valkenburg in the Netherlands to Liège in Belgium, using climbs that feature in the races of Liège–Bastogne–Liège Femmes and Amstel Gold Race. With 35 kilometres (22 mi) to go, Puck Pieterse (Fenix–Deceuninck) began to pull away from the peloton on the Côte de La Redoute climb, before being chased back by GC contenders. Justine Ghekiere (AG Insurance–Soudal) attacked on the next climb, gaining a small lead on the descent. The peloton then caught Ghekiere 300 metres from the top of the final climb, with Vollering, Pieterse, Katarzyna Niewiadoma (Canyon//SRAM) and Pauliena Rooijakkers (Fenix–Deceuninck) then pulling away from the peloton. Pieterse took the QoM points at the top. Descending towards Liège, the trio of Vollering, Niewiadoma and Pieterse pulled away from Rooijakkers – with Vollering taking bonus seconds on a minor climb located around 11 kilometres (6.8 mi) to go. At the finish, Pieterse outsprinted Vollering to take her first stage win of the Tour. Vollering retained her yellow jersey of the GC, extending her lead to 22 seconds. Pieterse took second place, the lead of the young rider classification as well as the polka-dot jersey of the mountains classification. Niewiadoma took third place, 34 seconds on GC behind Vollering. Kool retained her green jersey of the points classification.

Stage 5 took the riders south to Amnéville, entering France for the first time. Pieterse extended her lead in the QoM classification by crossing summits ahead of the peloton. With teams preparing for a sprint finish, a sharp corner out of a roundabout with 6 kilometres (3.7 mi) remaining caught the peloton by surprise, with around 25 riders crashing at high speed. Riders who lost time included the yellow jersey of Vollering, 2nd place overall Pieterse and young rider contenders van Anrooij (Lidl–Trek) and Bradbury (Canyon//SRAM). Vollering took some time to remount her bike, and was visibly in pain as she rode towards the finish. Two riders abandoned the race following their injuries sustained in the crash, with Pfeiffer Georgi (Team dsm–firmenich PostNL) suffering a fractured neck and broken hand. A small group of remaining riders including Niewiadoma, Faulkner, Blanka Vas (Team SD Worx–Protime), Liane Lippert (Movistar Team), and Cédrine Kerbaol (Ceratizit–WNT Pro Cycling) pushed on towards the finish, fighting amongst themselves in the final kilometre. Finally, Lippert went in the final steep section, however Vas was strong enough to overtake her and take her first stage win in the Tour. Niewiadoma took the GC lead, 19 seconds ahead of Faulkner and 22 seconds ahead of Pieterse. She expressed her delight in taking the yellow jersey, stating that "It feels very special". Despite her crash, Pieterse retained her lead in the QoM and young rider classifications. Vollering had crossed the line 1 min 47 s behind Vas, and fell to 9th place overall, 1 min 19 s behind Niewiadoma. Following the stage, Vollering noted that she was glad not to "suffer any broken bones" given the speed of the crash, however following the race she subsequently admitted that her tailbone had been broken in the crash. There was criticism of Team SD Worx–Protime for not sending riders to support Vollering to the finish line, with Vas noting that her radio was not working.

Stage 6 took the riders further south on a hilly course to Morteau. Ghekiere rode with two separate breakaways to take maximum QoM points on the first four climbs, with Marianne Vos (Visma–Lease a Bike) winning the intermediate sprint, to reduce the margin between her and Kool. After the final climb, Kerbaol attacked from the peloton, descending at high speed – gaining a 30-second lead with 5 kilometres (3.1 mi) remaining. Despite a final steep climb towards the finish, Kerbaol took France's first ever stage win at the Tour. She moved up to 2nd place overall, 16 seconds behind Niewiadoma. Behind Kerbaol, Vos won the group sprint for second place, thereby taking the lead in the points classification from Kool. Ghekiere took the polka-dot jersey of the QoM classification, with Pieterse maintaining her lead in the young rider classification. 16 riders remained within two minutes of the overall lead, with 9 different teams in the top 10.

=== Mountain stages in the Alps ===
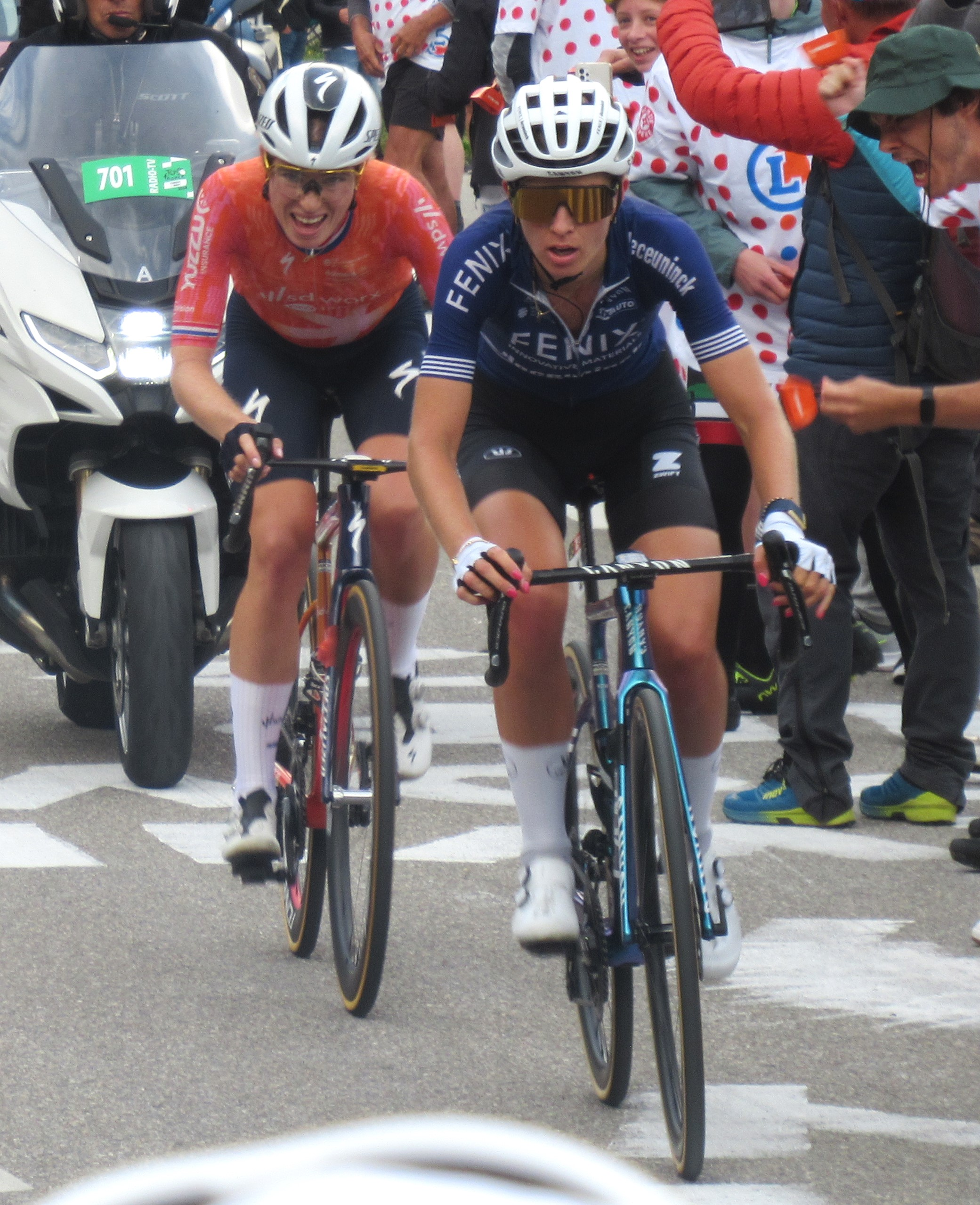
Pauliena Rooijakkers (Fenix–Deceuninck) and Demi Vollering (Team SD Worx–Protime) on Alpe d'Huez

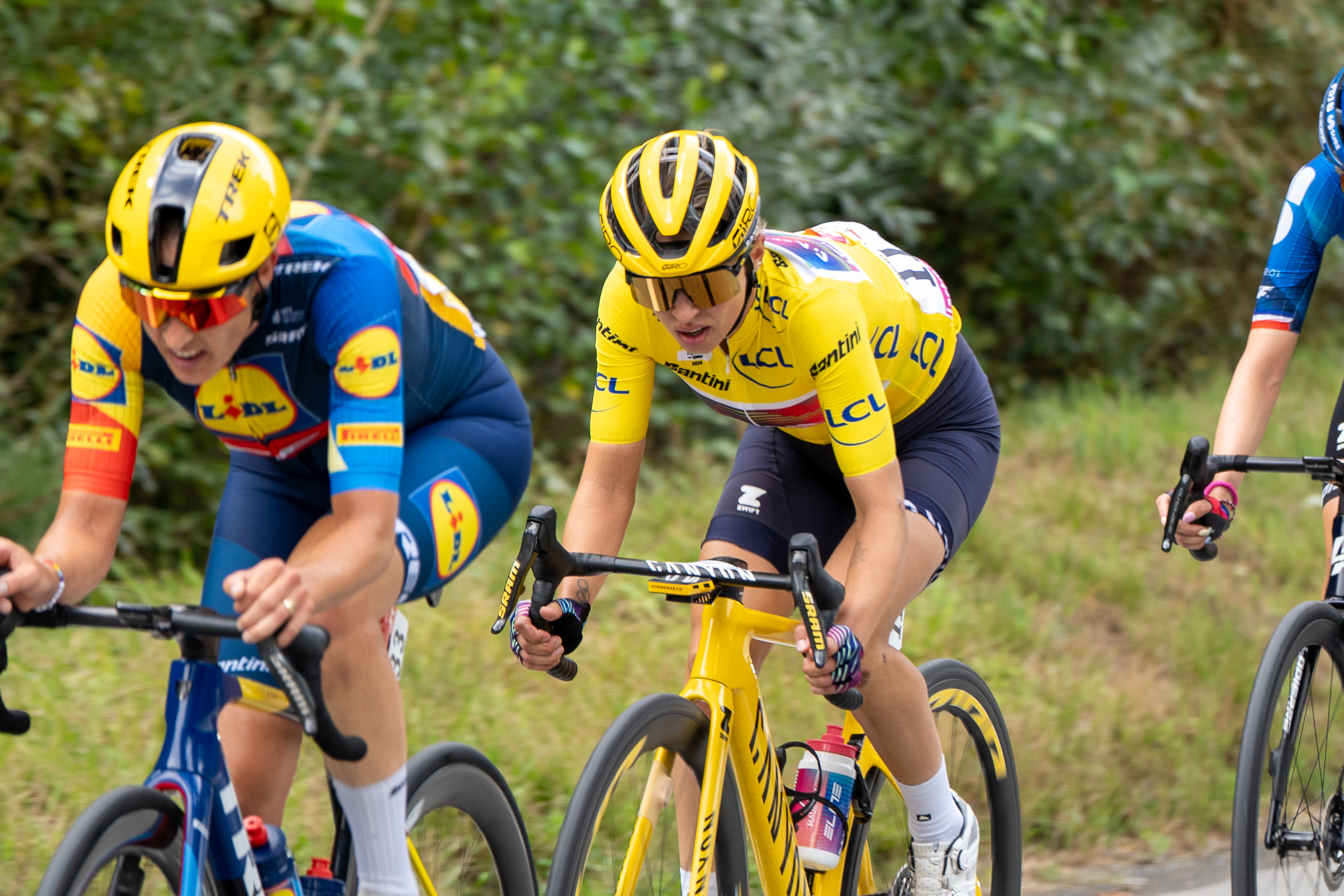
Katarzyna Niewiadoma (Canyon//SRAM) in pursuit on Alpe d'Huez

Stage 7 was the first of two stages in the French Alps, with five categorised climbs on the longest stage of the Tour from Champagnole to Le Grand-Bornand, 166.4 km (103.4 mi) in length.

Early on in the stage, Kool – winner of stages one and two – abandoned the race. Riding with the peloton, Pieterse claimed the QoM points on the first climb, beating Ghekiere; her rival for the polka-dot jersey. A group of six riders broke away from the peloton – including Vos and Ghekiere. Ghekiere subsequently took maximum QoM points on the next two climbs, extending her lead in the mountains classification. Vos then won the intermediate sprint, extending her points classification lead. The lead of the breakaway grew to around 5 minutes, approaching the last two climbs of the stage. On the penultimate climb, the peloton worked hard to reduce the gap to the breakaway. Ghekiere attacked, attempting to solo towards the finish and gain further QoM points. At the top of the climb, Ghekiere had a lead of 2 min 30 s followed by a group including GC favourites such as Niewiadoma and Vollering. Despite attempts by GC contenders, the gap to Ghekiere did not fall substantially throughout the climb. Reaching the top of the final climb, Ghekiere won the stage by 1 min 15 s ahead of Maëva Squiban (Arkéa–B&B Hotels Women), further extending her lead in the mountains classification. In the last kilometre, Niewiadoma tested the remaining GC contenders with a powerful acceleration, with only Vollering able to follow. At the finish line, Vollering overtook Niewiadoma to take 3rd on the stage, gaining four bonus seconds for her efforts and moving up to 8th overall. Niewiadoma extended her overall lead to 27 seconds ahead of Pieterse. Kerbaol fell to third place overall, 10 seconds further back. Following the withdrawal of Kool, Vos now had an "almost unassailable" lead in the points classification. Following the stage, media noted that Vollering had only one more stage to make up time, with Niewiadoma noting that Sunday would be "the most important day of my career and maybe my team's existence". In January 2025, Vollering revealed that the stage had been the hardest of her career owing to anxiety and pressure, noting that she "hit a breaking point" on the stage – and that in hindsight, finishing the stage was the "most meaningful personal victory in the entire Tour de France Femmes".

Stage 8 was the queen stage of the race, a 149.9 km (93.1 mi) stage from Le Grand-Bornand to a summit finish at Alpe d'Huez. The riders tackled three categorised climbs – the second category Col de Tamié (9.5km with an average gradient of 4%), the hors catégorie Col du Glandon (19.7km with an average gradient of 7.2%) at an elevation of 1,924 m (6,312 ft), and finally the hors catégorie Alpe d'Huez (13.8km with an average gradient of 8.1%). The race finished at the summit of Alpe d'Huez, at an elevation of 1,850 m (6,070 ft).

The stage started with a breakaway of 22 riders, including Ghekiere in the polka-dot jersey. On the Col de Tamié, Ghekiere took maximum QoM points, increasing her lead in the mountains classification over Pieterse. The lead of the breakaway fell from 2 min 30 s to under 90 seconds as they approached the bottom of the Col du Glandon. The peloton pushed up the climb at a high pace, slowly reducing to a group of GC favourites. With 2.5 kilometres (1.6 mi) of the climb remaining, Vollering attacked from this group – with only Rooijakkers able to follow. Niewiadoma stayed with Lucinda Brand (Lidl–Trek), Évita Muzic (FDJ–Suez) and Gaia Realini (Lidl–Trek), as Vollering and Rooijakkers quickly built up a lead of around a minute by the top of the Glandon. After a 20-kilometre (12 mi) descent into the valley, the pair had a lead of 90 seconds – putting them in the virtual yellow jersey. On the flat valley road, Niewiadoma worked with Brand, Realini and Muzic to reduce the gap to the pair ahead. At the foot of Alpe d'Huez, with 13.8 kilometres (8.6 mi) of the stage remaining, the gap had fallen to 45 seconds. On the climb, Vollering and Rooijakkers pushed hard to increase the gap to over a minute – the pair needed a winning margin of around 1 min 10 s to take the yellow jersey. However, Niewiadoma worked with Muzic and Realini to stabilise the gap, with 5 kilometres (3.1 mi) of the climb remaining. On the final part of the climb Vollering began to tire, with the gap to Niewiadoma falling to around 50 seconds. In the final metres of the stage, Vollering accelerated past Rooijakkers to take her second stage win of the Tour, taking 10 seconds in time bonuses for winning the stage. Around a minute later, Niewiadoma and Muzic crossed the finish line – with Niewiadoma therefore winning the yellow jersey by a margin of four seconds, the smallest margin of victory in Tour de France history.

=== Results ===
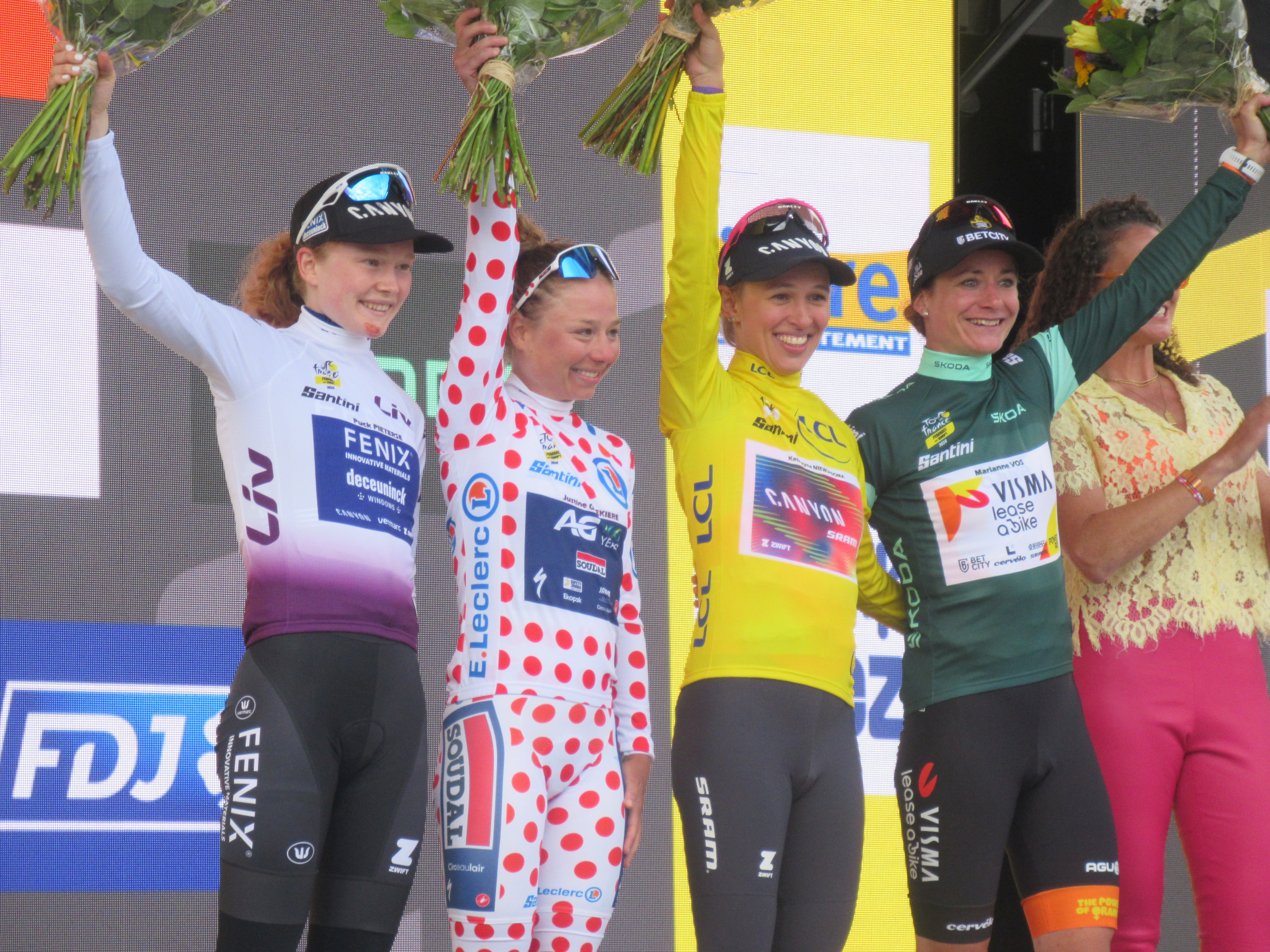
Classification podium, with (left to right) Puck Pieterse, Justine Ghekiere, Katarzyna Niewiadoma and Marianne Vos

In the final general classification (GC), Katarzyna Niewiadoma (Canyon//SRAM) won the Tour de France Femmes with an advantage over defending champion Demi Vollering (Team SD Worx–Protime) of just four seconds. As well as taking second place, Vollering took the super-combativity award for the most combative rider. Pauliena Rooijakkers (Fenix–Deceuninck) took third place overall after her strong performance on the final stage.

In the race's other classifications, Marianne Vos (Visma–Lease a Bike) won the green jersey of the points classification for the second time, after winning it in the 2022 edition. Justine Ghekiere (AG Insurance–Soudal) took the polka-dot jersey as winner of the Queen of the Mountains (QoM) classification. Puck Pieterse (Fenix–Deceuninck) took the white jersey as the winner of the young riders classification, which was awarded to the best-placed GC rider under the age of 23. Lidl–Trek won the team classification as the team with the lowest aggregate time among their three best-placed riders. Out of 153 starters, 110 finished the event.

Niewiadoma stated that the win was "a dream come true", noting that she had experienced a "rollercoaster of emotions" on the stage after Vollering accelerated away from her on the Col du Glandon. Niewiadoma hoped that her victory would attract more women to ride and race. Vollering expressed her disappointment in losing by just four seconds, stating "that's a bit sour for me at the moment". Michel Cornelisse, the directeur sportif of Fenix–Deceuninck stated that the race had been "a dream", with Rooijakkers in third place overall and Pieterse winning the young rider classification.

== Classification leadership ==
Classification leadership by stage
Stage	Winner	General classification	Points classification	Mountains classification	Young rider classification	Team classification	Combativity award
1	Charlotte Kool	Charlotte Kool	Charlotte Kool (Note: On stages 2 and 3, Marianne Vos, who was second in the points classification, wore the green jersey, because first-placed Charlotte Kool wore the yellow jersey as the leader of the general classification.)	Cristina Tonetti	Anniina Ahtosalo	Ceratizit–WNT Pro Cycling	Yurani Blanco
2	Charlotte Kool	Charlotte Kool	Charlotte Kool	Cristina Tonetti	Anniina Ahtosalo	Ceratizit–WNT Pro Cycling	Audrey De Keersmaeker
3	Demi Vollering	Demi Vollering	Charlotte Kool	Cristina Tonetti	Anniina Ahtosalo	Team SD Worx–Protime	no award
4	Puck Pieterse	Demi Vollering	Charlotte Kool	Puck Pieterse	Puck Pieterse (Note: On stages 5 and 6, Shirin van Anrooij, who was second in the young rider classification, wore the white jersey, because first-placed Puck Pieterse wore the polkadot jersey as the leader of the mountains classification.)	EF–Oatly–Cannondale	Justine Ghekiere
5	Blanka Vas	Katarzyna Niewiadoma	Charlotte Kool	Puck Pieterse	Puck Pieterse	Lidl–Trek	Loes Adegeest
6	Cédrine Kerbaol	Katarzyna Niewiadoma	Marianne Vos	Justine Ghekiere	Puck Pieterse	Lidl–Trek	Cédrine Kerbaol
7	Justine Ghekiere	Katarzyna Niewiadoma	Marianne Vos	Justine Ghekiere	Puck Pieterse	Lidl–Trek	Julie Van de Velde
8	Demi Vollering	Katarzyna Niewiadoma	Marianne Vos	Justine Ghekiere	Puck Pieterse	Lidl–Trek	Demi Vollering
Final		Katarzyna Niewiadoma	Marianne Vos	Justine Ghekiere	Puck Pieterse	Lidl–Trek	Demi Vollering

== Classification standings ==
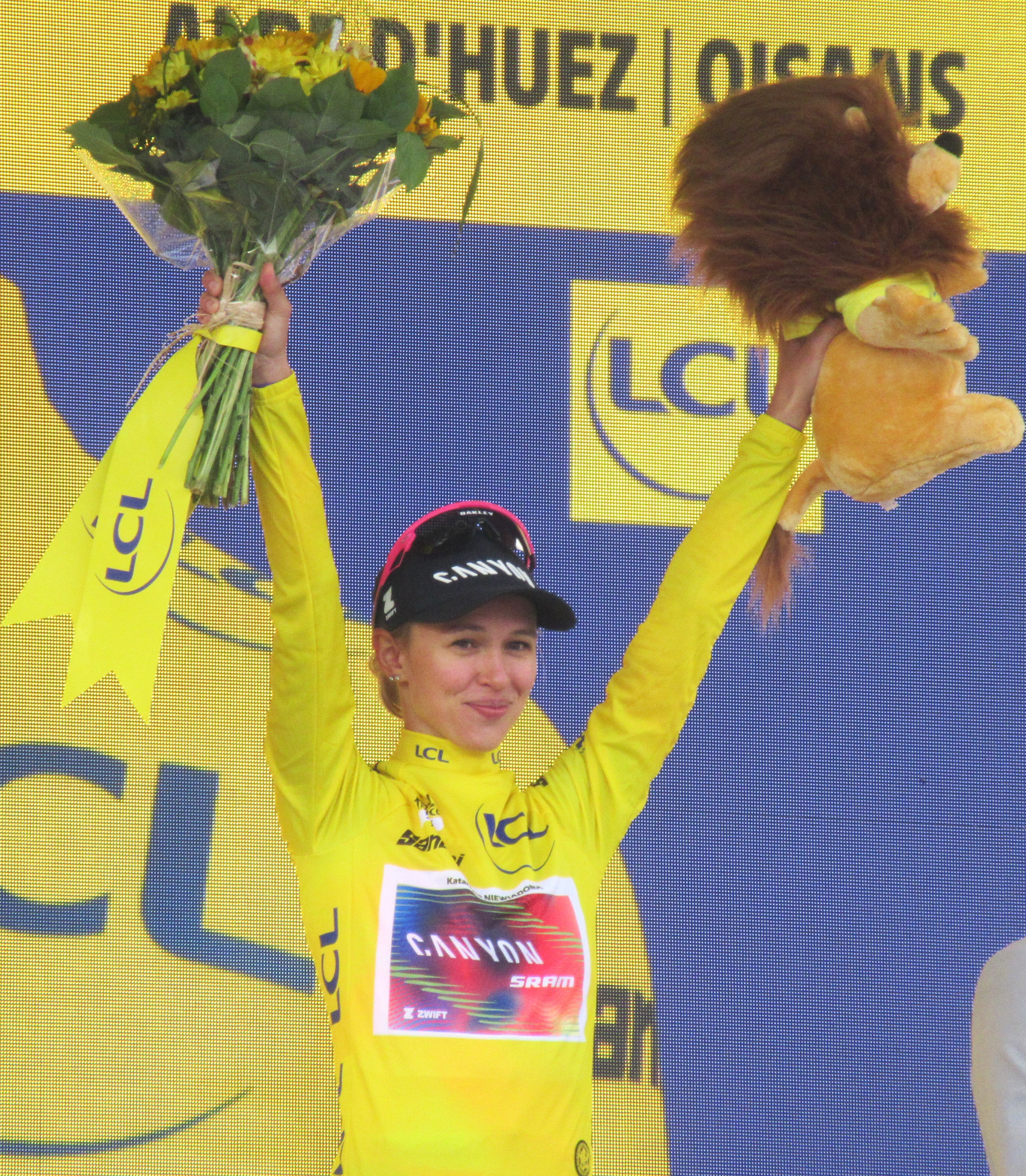
Niewiadoma celebrating her race victory

Legend
Denotes the winner of the general classification	Denotes the winner of the mountains classification
Denotes the winner of the points classification	Denotes the winner of the young rider classification
Denotes the winner of the team classification	Denotes the winner of the combativity award

=== General classification ===
Final general classification (1–10)
Rank	Rider	Team	Time
1	Katarzyna Niewiadoma (POL)	Canyon//SRAM	24h 36' 07"
2	Demi Vollering (NED)	Team SD Worx–Protime	+ 4"
3	Pauliena Rooijakkers (NED)	Fenix–Deceuninck	+ 10"
4	Évita Muzic (FRA)	FDJ–Suez	+ 1' 21"
5	Gaia Realini (ITA)	Lidl–Trek	+ 2' 19"
6	Cédrine Kerbaol (FRA)	Ceratizit–WNT Pro Cycling	+ 2' 51"
7	Sarah Gigante (AUS)	AG Insurance–Soudal	+ 7' 09"
8	Lucinda Brand (NED)	Lidl–Trek	+ 8' 06"
9	Juliette Labous (FRA)	Team dsm–firmenich PostNL	+ 8' 07"
10	Thalita de Jong (NED)	Lotto–Dstny Ladies	+ 8' 12"

Final general classification (11–110)
Rank	Rider	Team	Time
11	Puck Pieterse (NED)	Fenix–Deceuninck	+ 8' 28"
12	Erica Magnaldi (ITA)	UAE Team ADQ	+ 9' 16"
13	Shirin van Anrooij (NED)	Lidl–Trek	+ 9' 35"
14	Niamh Fisher-Black (NZL)	Team SD Worx–Protime	+ 11' 39"
15	Mareille Meijering (NED)	Movistar Team	+ 11' 49"
16	Lotte Claes (BEL)	Arkéa–B&B Hotels Women	+ 12' 09"
17	Marion Bunel (FRA)	St. Michel–Mavic–Auber93	+ 12' 40"
18	Liane Lippert (GER)	Movistar Team	+ 14' 22"
19	Léa Curinier (FRA)	FDJ–Suez	+ 14' 40"
20	Alice Maria Arzuffi (ITA)	Ceratizit–WNT Pro Cycling	+ 14' 47"
21	Silke Smulders (NED)	Liv AlUla Jayco	+ 15' 37"
22	Valentina Cavallar (AUT)	Arkéa–B&B Hotels Women	+ 16' 55"
23	Hannah Ludwig (GER)	Cofidis	+ 20' 35"
24	Usoa Ostolaza (ESP)	Laboral Kutxa–Fundación Euskadi	+ 20' 37"
25	Katrine Aalerud (NOR)	Uno-X Mobility	+ 20' 48"
26	Mavi García (ESP)	Liv AlUla Jayco	+ 21' 36"
27	Grace Brown (AUS)	FDJ–Suez	+ 23' 12"
28	Cecilie Uttrup Ludwig (DEN)	FDJ–Suez	+ 24' 22"
29	Mie Bjørndal Ottestad (NOR)	Uno-X Mobility	+ 26' 29"
30	Justine Ghekiere (BEL)	AG Insurance–Soudal	+ 26' 53"
31	Marianne Vos (NED)	Visma–Lease a Bike	+ 27' 46"
32	Neve Bradbury (AUS)	Canyon//SRAM	+ 31' 33"
33	Julie Van de Velde (BEL)	AG Insurance–Soudal	+ 33' 31"
34	Caroline Andersson (SWE)	Liv AlUla Jayco	+ 35' 52"
35	Victorie Guilman (FRA)	St. Michel–Mavic–Auber93	+ 38' 22"
36	Kimberley Le Court (MRI)	AG Insurance–Soudal	+ 39' 14"
37	Amber Kraak (NED)	FDJ–Suez	+ 42' 06"
38	Kristen Faulkner (USA)	EF–Oatly–Cannondale	+ 43' 36"
39	Karlijn Swinkels (NED)	UAE Team ADQ	+ 44' 57"
40	Maëva Squiban (FRA)	Arkéa–B&B Hotels Women	+ 47' 20"
41	Olivia Baril (CAN)	Movistar Team	+ 49' 23"
42	Noemi Rüegg (SUI)	EF–Oatly–Cannondale	+ 49' 58"
43	Fem van Empel (NED)	Visma–Lease a Bike	+ 51' 27"
44	Riejanne Markus (NED)	Visma–Lease a Bike	+ 52' 08"
45	Ane Santesteban (ESP)	Laboral Kutxa–Fundación Euskadi	+ 54' 18"
46	Sara Martín (ESP)	Movistar Team	+ 54' 24"
47	Yanina Kuskova (UZB)	Tashkent City Women Professional Cycling Team	+ 55' 52"
48	Simone Boilard (CAN)	Uno-X Mobility	+ 56' 11"
49	Maaike Coljé (NED)	Arkéa–B&B Hotels Women	+ 57' 02"
50	Franziska Koch (GER)	Team dsm–firmenich PostNL	+ 57' 35"
51	Francesca Barale (ITA)	Team dsm–firmenich PostNL	+ 1h 00' 19"
52	Floortje Mackaij (NED)	Movistar Team	+ 1h 01' 18"
53	Loes Adegeest (NED)	FDJ–Suez	+ 1h 01' 47"
54	Mischa Bredewold (NED)	Team SD Worx–Protime	+ 1h 03' 55"
55	Femke de Vries (NED)	Visma–Lease a Bike	+ 1h 04' 18
56	Marte Berg Edseth (NOR)	Uno-X Mobility	+ 1h 04' 37"
57	Yara Kastelijn (NED)	Fenix–Deceuninck	+ 1h 05' 12"
58	Christine Majerus (LUX)	Team SD Worx–Protime	+ 1h 07' 30"
59	Ellen van Dijk (NED)	Lidl–Trek	+ 1h 08' 38"
60	Gaia Masetti (ITA)	AG Insurance–Soudal	+ 1h 09' 21"
61	Elisa Balsamo (ITA)	Lidl–Trek	+ 1h 09' 35"
62	Lorena Wiebes (NED)	Team SD Worx–Protime	+ 1h 09' 41"
63	Blanka Vas (HUN)	Team SD Worx–Protime	+ 1h 11' 37"
64	Quinty Ton (NED)	Liv AlUla Jayco	+ 1h 12' 36"
65	Célia Le Mouel (FRA)	St. Michel–Mavic–Auber93	+ 1h 12' 53"
66	Victoire Berteau (FRA)	Cofidis	+ 1h 13' 02"
67	Catalina Soto (CHI)	Laboral Kutxa–Fundación Euskadi	+ 1h 13' 32"
68	Laura Tomasi (ITA)	Laboral Kutxa–Fundación Euskadi	+ 1h 13' 55"
69	Silvia Persico (ITA)	UAE Team ADQ	+ 1h 14' 27"
70	Sarah Roy (AUS)	Cofidis	+ 1h 15' 52"
71	Audrey De Keersmaeker (BEL)	Lotto–Dstny Ladies	+ 1h 16' 15"
72	Linda Riedmann (GER)	Visma–Lease a Bike	+ 1h 17' 41"
73	Anna van Wersch (NED)	Lotto–Dstny Ladies	+ 1h 18' 55"
74	Lizzie Deignan (GBR)	Lidl–Trek	+ 1h 19' 07"
75	Anouska Koster (NED)	Uno-X Mobility	+ 1h 19' 36"
76	Emma Norsgaard (DEN)	Movistar Team	+ 1h 20' 46"
77	Soraya Paladin (ITA)	Canyon//SRAM	+ 1h 21' 31"
78	Lizzie Holden (GBR)	UAE Team ADQ	+ 1h 21' 48"
79	Sophie von Berswordt (NED)	Visma–Lease a Bike	+ 1h 22' 02"
80	Karolina Kumięga (POL)	UAE Team ADQ	+ 1h 22' 36"
81	Anniina Ahtosalo (FIN)	Uno-X Mobility	+ 1h 22' 56"
82	Mikayla Harvey (NZL)	UAE Team ADQ	+ 1h 25' 35"
83	Sandra Alonso (ESP)	Ceratizit–WNT Pro Cycling	+ 1h 25' 55"
84	Coralie Demay (FRA)	FDJ–Suez	+ 1h 31' 59"
85	Iurani Blanco (ESP)	Laboral Kutxa–Fundación Euskadi	+ 1h 32' 24"
86	Julie De Wilde (BEL)	Fenix–Deceuninck	+ 1h 33' 40"
87	Agnieszka Skalniak-Sójka (POL)	Canyon//SRAM	+ 1h 34' 01"
88	Carina Schrempf (AUT)	Fenix–Deceuninck	+ 1h 34' 12"
89	Alice Towers (GBR)	Canyon//SRAM	+ 1h 34' 42"
90	Marthe Truyen (BEL)	Fenix–Deceuninck	+ 1h 36' 19"
91	Nikola Nosková (CZE)	Cofidis	+ 1h 37' 44"
92	Romy Kasper (GER)	Human Powered Health	+ 1h 38' 36"
93	Audrey Cordon-Ragot (FRA)	Human Powered Health	+ 1h 40' 12"
94	Maria Giulia Confalonieri (ITA)	Uno-X Mobility	+ 1h 42' 10"
95	Maureen Arens (NED)	Lotto–Dstny Ladies	+ 1h 42' 32"
96	Kathrin Schweinberger (AUT)	Ceratizit–WNT Pro Cycling	+ 1h 44' 21"
97	Lotta Henttala (FIN)	EF–Oatly–Cannondale	+ 1h 44' 27"
98	Nina Berton (LUX)	Ceratizit–WNT Pro Cycling	+ 1h 44' 29"
99	Rachele Barbieri (ITA)	Team dsm–firmenich PostNL	+ 1h 45' 28"
100	Cristina Tonetti (ITA)	Laboral Kutxa–Fundación Euskadi	+ 1h 46' 16"
101	Emilia Fahlin (SWE)	Arkéa–B&B Hotels Women	+ 1h 47' 31"
102	Giorgia Vettorello (ITA)	Roland	+ 1h 47' 56"
103	Jeanne Korevaar (NED)	Liv AlUla Jayco	+ 1h 48' 11"
104	Amandine Fouquenet (FRA)	Arkéa–B&B Hotels Women	+ 1h 49' 35"
105	Alison Jackson (CAN)	EF–Oatly–Cannondale	+ 1h 50' 20"
106	Michaela Drummond (NZL)	Arkéa–B&B Hotels Women	+ 1h 53' 39"
107	Mylène de Zoete (NED)	Ceratizit–WNT Pro Cycling	+ 2h 00' 16"
108	Sylvie Swinkels (NED)	Roland	+ 2h 03' 49"
109	Wilma Aintila (FIN)	Lotto–Dstny Ladies	+ 2h 12' 39"
110	Fauve Bastiaenssen (BEL)	Lotto–Dstny Ladies	+ 2h 14' 25"

=== Points classification ===
Final points classification (1–10)
Rank	Rider	Team	Points
1	Marianne Vos (NED)	Visma–Lease a Bike	170
2	Lorena Wiebes (NED)	Team SD Worx–Protime	110
3	Katarzyna Niewiadoma (POL)	Canyon//SRAM	99
4	Demi Vollering (NED)	Team SD Worx–Protime	85
5	Blanka Vas (HUN)	Team SD Worx–Protime	75
6	Anniina Ahtosalo (FIN)	Uno-X Mobility	73
7	Cédrine Kerbaol (FRA)	Ceratizit–WNT Pro Cycling	67
8	Puck Pieterse (NED)	Fenix–Deceuninck	61
9	Evita Muzic (FRA)	FDJ–Suez	55
10	Justine Ghekiere (BEL)	AG Insurance–Soudal	51

=== Mountains classification ===
Final mountains classification (1–10)
Rank	Rider	Team	Points
1	Justine Ghekiere (BEL)	AG Insurance–Soudal	46
2	Demi Vollering (NED)	Team SD Worx–Protime	34
3	Puck Pieterse (NED)	Fenix–Deceuninck	25
4	Katarzyna Niewiadoma (POL)	Canyon//SRAM	25
5	Pauliena Rooijakkers (NED)	Fenix–Deceuninck	23
6	Valentina Cavallar (AUT)	Arkéa–B&B Hotels Women	18
7	Yara Kastelijn (NED)	Fenix–Deceuninck	14
8	Evita Muzic (FRA)	FDJ–Suez	14
9	Silvia Persico (ITA)	UAE Team ADQ	13
10	Sarah Gigante (AUS)	AG Insurance–Soudal	11

=== Young rider classification ===
Final young rider classification (1–10)
Rank	Rider	Team	Time
1	Puck Pieterse (NED)	Fenix–Deceuninck	24h 44' 35"
2	Shirin van Anrooij (NED)	Lidl–Trek	+ 1' 07"
3	Marion Bunel (FRA)	St. Michel–Mavic–Auber93	+ 4' 12"
4	Neve Bradbury (AUS)	Canyon//SRAM	+ 23' 05"
5	Maëva Squiban (FRA)	Arkéa–B&B Hotels Women	+ 38' 52"
6	Fem van Empel (NED)	Visma–Lease a Bike	+ 42' 59"
7	Francesca Barale (ITA)	Team dsm–firmenich PostNL	+ 51' 51"
8	Linda Riedmann (GER)	Visma–Lease a Bike	+ 1h 09' 13"
9	Anniina Ahtosalo (FIN)	Uno-X Mobility	+ 1h 14' 28"
10	Julie De Wilde (BEL)	Fenix–Deceuninck	+ 1h 25' 12"

=== Team classification ===
Final team classification (1–10)
Rank	Team	Time
1	(United States) Lidl–Trek	74h 07' 21"
2	(France) FDJ–Suez	+ 11' 52"
3	(Spain) Movistar Team	+ 35' 09"
4	(Belgium) AG Insurance–Soudal	+ 35' 51"
5	(France) Arkéa–B&B Hotels Women	+ 45' 52"
6	(Netherlands) Team SD Worx–Protime	+ 48' 45"
7	(Australia) Liv AlUla Jayco	+ 53' 48"
8	(Belgium) Fenix–Deceuninck	+ 54' 55"
9	(Norway) Uno-X Mobility	+ 1h 11' 51"
10	(Germany) Ceratizit–WNT Pro Cycling	+ 1h 19' 18"

== Reception ==
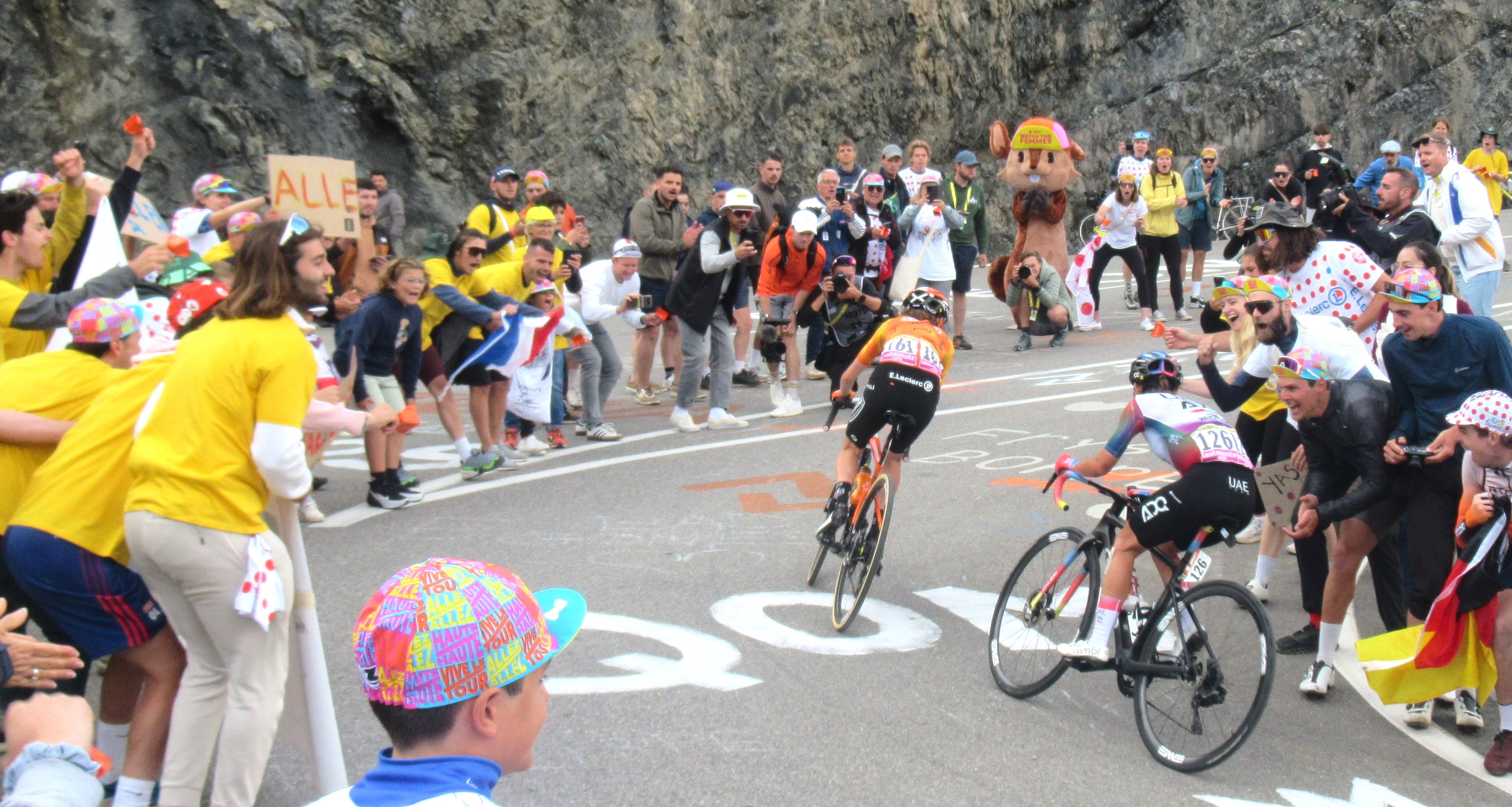
Crowds cheering on French rider Marion Bunel on Alpe d'Huez

Media praised the race, with The Guardian calling the stage to Alpe d'Huez an "epic finale", L'Équipe stating that the race "surely exceeded all possible scenarios", and Rouleur calling it "the best race ever". France Bleu stated that the race had been "full of spectacle and suspense" and Le Parisien considered that the 2024 edition had "offered itself some guarantees for the future".

There was specific praise for Niewiadoma and her Canyon//SRAM team, with Przegląd Sportowy stating that Niewiadoma had "proved something to the unbelievers". There was also praise for Pieterse, Kerbaol and Ghekiere, as well as the crowds in the Netherlands. There was criticism of Team SD Worx–Protime and their tactics, the "logistical nightmare" of two stages on one day and the disparity in prize money. There was some disappointment regarding the lack of crowds on Alpe d'Huez, while noting the size of the roadside crowds were growing year on year.

Reacting to the final stage, race director Marion Rousse stated that she did not "remember ever experiencing such an intense moment" and that Christian Prudhomme, race director of the men's tour had told her that he was "jealous of the suspense of this race". Cycling Weekly concluded that the "razor-thin" margin of victory demonstrated the "extraordinary level of competition in women's cycling and the depth of talent in the field". Danny Stam, directeur sportif of Team SD Worx–Protime later expressed his disappointment in losing the Tour, stating that the crash on stage 5 "was decisive because we lost those damn four seconds that cost Demi Vollering the yellow jersey".

There was anticipation for the 2025 edition of the race, with an increase in the length of the race to nine days, and the return of four-time Giro d'Italia Women winner Anna van der Breggen and French multi-discipline world champion Pauline Ferrand-Prévot to the peloton.

== Broadcasting ==
As with previous editions, live television coverage was provided by France Télévisions in conjunction with the European Broadcasting Union. At least two and a half hours of each stage were broadcast, with the first two stages in the Netherlands shown from start to finish. The race was shown in 190 countries on 24 television channels.

In France, France 2 reported a peak of 3.5 million viewers watched stage 8 to Alpe d'Huez, with 1.5 million to 2 million viewers watched the race during the week. In Belgium, an average of 394,000 viewers watched the final stage, with four stages of the race having an average of over 240,000 viewers. In the Netherlands, nearly a million viewers (923,000) watched the final stage, just fewer than the 957,000 viewers that watched the final stage of the men's Tour de France. Le Figaro noted that although viewership in France had fallen slightly, there was 20% more viewers in Belgium and 40% more in the Netherlands compared to the 2023 edition.
