= 2025 European Road Championships – Women's time trial =

Women's elite time trial
2025 European Road Championships

Race details
- Dates: 1 October 2025
- Stages: 1
- Distance: 24 km (15 mi)
- Winning time: 33:06.83

Medalists
	Gold	Marlen Reusser (SUI)
	Silver	Mie Bjørndal Ottestad (NOR)
	Bronze	Mischa Bredewold (NED)

The women's elite time trial at the 2025 European Road Championships took place on 1 October 2025, in Guilherand-Granges, France.

== Results ==
Rank	#	Cyclist	Nation	Time	Diff.
1st place, gold medalist(s)	1	Marlen Reusser	Switzerland	33:06.83	
2nd place, silver medalist(s)	22	Mie Bjørndal Ottestad	Norway	33:56.03	+00:49.20
3rd place, bronze medalist(s)	3	Mischa Bredewold	Netherlands	33:57.91	+00:51.08
4	9	Katrine Aalerud	Norway	33:58.11	+00:51.28
5	20	Lieke Nooijen	Netherlands	34:05.06	+00:58.23
6	21	Juliette Labous	France	34:11.09	+01:04.26
7	29	Anna Henderson	Great Britain	34:11.98	+01:05.15
8	2	Christina Schweinberger	Austria	34:37.58	+01:30.75
9	4	Cedrine Kerbaol	France	34:57.91	+01:51.08
10	14	Yuliia Biriukova	Ukraine	35:13.78	+02:06.95
11	18	Jasmin Liechti	Switzerland	35:16.07	+02:09.24
12	7	Vittoria Guazzini	Italy	35:22.72	+02:15.89
13	12	Mireia Benito	Spain	35:33.77	+02:26.94
14	16	Lotte Claes	Belgium	35:33.95	+02:27.12
15	5	Rebecca Koerner	Denmark	35:44.72	+02:37.89
16	28	Lisa Klein	Germany	35:45.74	+02:38.91
17	10	Agnieszka Skalniak-Sójka	Poland	35:48.50	+02:41.67
18	11	Eugenia Bujak	Slovenia	36:11.54	+03:04.71
19	17	Franziska Brauße	Germany	36:16.08	+03:09.25
20	19	Anna Kiesenhofer	Austria	36:23.78	+03:16.95
21	8	Dana Rožlapa	Latvia	36:37.18	+03:30.35
22	30	Nora Jenčušová	Slovakia	36:47.06	+03:40.23
23	15	Tamara Dronova	Individual Neutral Athletes	36:48.13	+03:41.30
24	27	Julie de Wilde	Belgium	36:48.92	+03:42.09
25	31	Daniela Campos	Portugal	37:05.79	+03:58.96
26	23	Marta Lach	Poland	37:09.65	+04:02.82
27	6	Petra Zsankó	Hungary	37:09.94	+04:03.11
28	25	Olga Shekel	Ukraine	37:33.70	+04:26.87
29	26	Natalia Frolova	Individual Neutral Athletes	39:22.31	+6:15.48
30	13	Reyhan Yakışır	Turkey	42:36.98	+9:30.15
31	24	Melike Çakır	Turkey	44:01.82	+10:54.99
