= Katrine Aalerud =

Norwegian cyclist (born 1994)

- Aalerud at the 2026 Tour of Britain Women

Personal information
- Full name: Katrine Aalerud
- Born: 4 December 1994 (age 31) Lørenskog, Norway
- Height: 1.68 m (5 ft 6 in)
- Weight: 54 kg (119 lb)

Cycling career
- Sport: Cycling
- Current team: Uno-X Mobility
- Discipline: Road
- Role: Rider
- Rider type: Climber; Time trialist

Amateur teams
- 2013–2015: IK Hero
- 2016: Bryne CK

Professional teams
- 2017: Team Hitec Products
- 2018–2019: Team Virtu Cycling
- 2020–2023: Movistar Team
- 2024–: Uno-X Mobility

Major wins
- One-day races and Classics National Time Trial Championships (2020, 2021, 2024–2026)

Katrine Aalerud (born 4 December 1994) is a Norwegian professional racing cyclist, who rides for UCI Women's WorldTeam Uno-X Mobility.

Since turning professional in 2017 with Team Hitec Products, Aalerud has won six career races – the general classification at the 2023 Vuelta a Andalucía, as well as five victories in the Norwegian National Time Trial Championships between 2020 and 2026. Aalerud has also represented Norway at the 2020 Summer Olympics, the European Road Cycling Championships on five occasions between 2016 and 2025, and the UCI Road World Championships every year between 2016 and 2025.

== Career ==
Born in Lørenskog, Aalerud made her first start in a professional road race at the 2015 Ladies Tour of Norway, where she rode for IK Hero. Moving to Bryne CK for the 2016 season, Aalerud recorded two podium finishes at the Norwegian National Road Championships – finishing third in the road race, and was part of the Bryne CK squad (along with Tone Hatteland Lima and Stine Borgli) that won the team time trial event. Aalerud finished third in the young rider classification at July's Internationale Thüringen Rundfahrt der Frauen, before representing Norway at both the UEC European Road Championships in France, and the UCI Road World Championships in Qatar; she crashed out of the European road race in the early stages, which left her briefly unconscious, before recording a 39th-place finish in the Worlds road race.

=== Team Hitec Products (2017) ===
Aalerud turned professional for the 2017 season with Team Hitec Products. She finished in sixth place at the Women's Tour de Yorkshire in April, before again recording two podium finishes at June's Norwegian National Road Championships – third in the time trial and second in the road race, both won by teammate Vita Heine. She was selected for the UCI Road World Championships for the second year in succession, held in and around Bergen, but failed to finish the road race.

=== Team Virtu Cycling (2018–2019) ===
Aalerud joined Team Virtu Cycling for the 2018 season, but in the first half of the year, she had only competed in four races – finishing one. Aalerud's best finish of the season ultimately came in September's Tour Cycliste Féminin International de l'Ardèche, where she finished in ninth place overall. Aalerud remained with Team Virtu Cycling into 2019, finishing seventh at the Emakumeen Euskal Bira in the spring, before finishing second to Vita Heine at the Norwegian National Time Trial Championships. Towards the end of the season, Aalerud repeated her top-ten overall finish from the previous year at the Tour Cycliste Féminin International de l'Ardèche, placing seventh overall.

=== Movistar Team (2020–2023) ===
Aalerud joined the Movistar Team for the 2020 season, having signed an initial two-year contract with the squad. In her first race with the team, she finished ninth overall at Setmana Ciclista Valenciana, prior to the COVID-19 pandemic-enforced suspension of racing. When racing resumed, Aalerud picked up her first national road cycling title, when she won the Norwegian National Time Trial Championships in Langangen, finishing seven seconds clear of Vita Heine. She also added a ninth-place finish, towards the end of the season, at Liège–Bastogne–Liège. Following the season, Aalerud extended her contract with the team by a further two years in November 2020, until the end of the 2023 season.

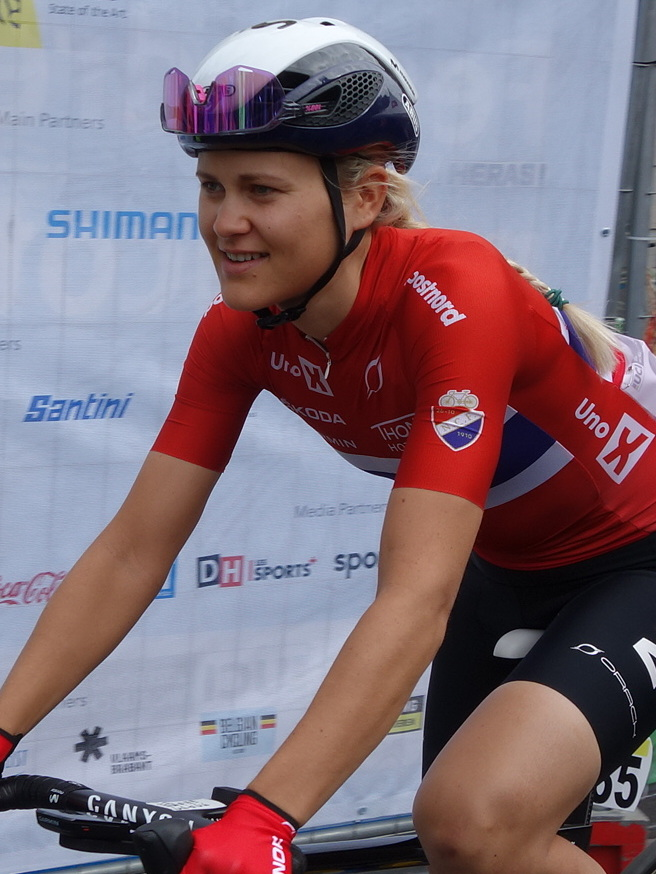
Aalerud, prior to the road race at the 2021 UCI Road World Championships

Aalerud recorded the first general classification podium finish of her career in 2021, at May's Setmana Ciclista Valenciana; she finished third on the opening stage – winning the first group sprint behind solo riders Annemiek van Vleuten and Mavi García, and maintained the same position throughout the remainder of the race. Later in the month, Aalerud took top-ten placings at the Emakumeen Nafarroako Klasikoa (seventh) and the Vuelta a Burgos Feminas (fifth overall), before winning the non-UCI-rated ReVolta event in a sprint finish from a four-rider group. Aalerud continued her successes into the Norwegian National Road Championships, where she won her second consecutive time trial title, beating Heine by twenty seconds. In the second half of the year, Aalerud represented Norway at the 2020 Summer Olympics in Japan, the UEC European Road Championships in Italy, and the UCI Road World Championships in Belgium.

In 2022, Aalerud was unable to win a third successive Norwegian time trial title, as she was beaten to the honours by Ane Iversen in Steinkjer, by a margin of just under five seconds. The result was Aalerud's single podium finish of the season, with her only other top-ten finishes coming in stage races – at the Vuelta a Andalucía (tenth) and the Tour of Scandinavia (ninth). Aalerud returned to the Vuelta a Andalucía in 2023, where she won the general classification on the final stage into Castellar de la Frontera; she overturned a 47-second deficit to Tamara Dronova, as a result of an attack with compatriot Mie Bjørndal Ottestad and Lotte Claes in the opening quarter of the stage, which ultimately gained them more than a minute by the finish. A second-place finish at the Norwegian National Road Race Championships in Sandnes followed, being out-sprinted to the line by Susanne Andersen.

=== Uno-X Mobility (2024–present) ===
After four seasons with the Movistar Team, Aalerud joined Uno-X Mobility for the 2024 season, having signed an initial two-year contract. Aalerud recorded her first podium finish with the team that April, when she finished in third place at the Festival Elsy Jacobs à Garnich in Luxembourg. The following month, Aalerud started a block of racing in Spain, where she finished fifth in the Durango-Durango Emakumeen Saria, ninth overall in the Vuelta a Andalucía, and third overall in the inaugural Volta a Catalunya Femenina, following a third-place finish on the queen stage that finished at the La Molina ski resort. Aalerud then regained the Norwegian National Time Trial Championships title in June, finishing more than a minute clear of her next closest competitor, teammate Mie Bjørndal Ottestad, in Bodø; she would go on to finish third in the Norwegian National Road Race Championships the following weekend, almost seven minutes behind Ottestad. She rode both the Giro d'Italia Women and the Tour de France Femmes, featuring in the breakaway on stages of both. Towards the end of the season, Aalerud finished sixth in the time trial at the UEC European Road Championships, eighth at the Giro dell'Emilia Internazionale Donne Elite, and fourth at the Chrono des Nations, missing the podium by less than seven seconds.

At the beginning of the 2025 season, Aalerud recorded top-ten placings at each of her first five race starts – sixth at the Trofeo Palma Femina, fourth at the Trofeo Binissalem–Andratx, eighth overall at the UAE Tour Women, ninth overall at Setmana Ciclista Valenciana, and fourth overall at the Vuelta a Extremadura Femenina. After overall placings of tenth at the Vuelta a Burgos Feminas and fifth at the Tour of Nowray, Aalerud won her fourth Norwegian time trial title ahead of teammate Ottestad, before Ottestad reversed the result in the road race several days later. Aalerud then finished tenth overall at the Giro d'Italia Women; she had been as high as fourth overall after five stages, but lost more than three minutes to the general classification contenders on the penultimate day's summit finish at Monte Nerone. She also contested the Tour de France Femmes, but had to withdraw from the race due to a crash while in eleventh place overall. Following the race, Aalerud signed a two-year contract extension with Uno-X Mobility, to remain with the team until the end of the 2027 season. Returning to racing at the UCI Road World Championships in Rwanda, Aalerud took a fifth-place finish in the time trial, missing out on a medal by twenty seconds. She followed this up with a fourth-place finish in the time trial at the UEC European Road Championships in France, losing out on the bronze medal to Mischa Bredewold by 0.2 seconds, before another eighth-place finish at the Giro dell'Emilia.

In 2026, Aalerud missed out on a top-ten placing at La Vuelta Femenina, as she lost almost four minutes on the final stage, finishing on the Alto de l'Angliru, which dropped her from eighth to fourteenth in the general classification. She won a third consecutive Norwegian time trial title that June – her fifth overall – finishing forty-two seconds clear of her teammate Sigrid Ytterhus Haugset in Stavanger; Haugset then beat Aalerud to the road race title, with Aalerud finishing second for the third time in four years. She then featured in breakaways at both the Tour de France Femmes, and the Tour of Britain Women, winning the combativity award on the second stage of the latter.

== Major results ==
Aalerud, prior to the road race at the 2023 UCI Road World Championships

2016
National Road Championships

1st Team time trial (with Tone Hatteland Lima and Stine Borgli)
3rd Road race

2017
National Road Championships

2nd Road race
3rd Time trial

6th Women's Tour de Yorkshire
2018
9th Overall Tour Cycliste Féminin International de l'Ardèche
2019
2nd Time trial, National Road Championships
7th Overall Emakumeen Euskal Bira
7th Overall Tour Cycliste Féminin International de l'Ardèche
2020
1st Time trial, National Road Championships
9th Overall Setmana Ciclista Valenciana
9th Liège–Bastogne–Liège
2021
1st Time trial, National Road Championships
1st ReVolta
3rd Overall Setmana Ciclista Valenciana
5th Overall Vuelta a Burgos Feminas
7th Emakumeen Nafarroako Klasikoa
2022
2nd Time trial, National Road Championships
9th Overall Tour of Scandinavia
10th Overall Vuelta a Andalucía
2023
1st Overall Vuelta a Andalucía
2nd Road race, National Road Championships
6th Durango-Durango Emakumeen Saria
2024
National Road Championships

1st Time trial
3rd Road race

3rd Overall Volta a Catalunya Femenina
3rd Festival Elsy Jacobs à Garnich
4th Chrono des Nations
5th Durango-Durango Emakumeen Saria
6th Time trial, UEC European Road Championships
8th Giro dell'Emilia Internazionale Donne Elite
9th Overall Vuelta a Andalucía
2025
National Road Championships

1st Time trial
2nd Road race

4th Time trial, UEC European Road Championships
4th Overall Vuelta a Extremadura Femenina
4th Trofeo Binissalem–Andratx
5th UCI Road World Championships – Women's time trial
5th Overall Tour of Nowray
6th Trofeo Palma Femina
8th Overall UAE Tour Women
8th Giro dell'Emilia Internazionale Donne Elite
9th Overall Setmana Ciclista Valenciana
10th Overall Giro d'Italia Women
10th Overall Vuelta a Burgos Feminas
2026
National Road Championships

1st Time trial
2nd Road race
