= 2025 Vuelta a Burgos Feminas =

Cycling race

2025 UCI Women's World Tour, race 17 of 27

Race details
- Dates: 22-25 May 2025
- Stages: 4
- Distance: 351.4 km (218.3 mi)
- Winning time: 9h 25' 40"

Results
Jersey awarded to the overall winner	Winner	Marlen Reusser (SUI)	(Movistar Team)
	Second	Elisa Longo Borghini (ITA)	(UAE Team ADQ)
	Third	Yara Kastelijn (NED)	(Fenix–Deceuninck)
Jersey awarded to the points classification winner	Points	Marlen Reusser (SUI)	(Movistar Team)
Jersey awarded to the mountains classification winner	Mountains	Marlen Reusser (SUI)	(Movistar Team)
Jersey awarded to the youth classification winner	Youth	Nienke Vinke (NED)	(Team Picnic–PostNL)
	Team	(France) FDJ–Suez	

The 2025 Vuelta a Burgos Feminas was a Spanish women's cycle stage race held in the Province of Burgos in northern Spain from 22 to 25 May. It was the tenth edition of Vuelta a Burgos Feminas, and the 17th event of the 2025 UCI Women's World Tour.

The race was won by Swiss rider Marlen Reusser of Movistar Team. Reusser won the mountainous stage 3 by 40 seconds, before securing victory by winning the individual time trial on stage 4. Reusser also won the points and mountains classifications. The youth classification was won by Dutch rider Nienke Vinke of Team Picnic PostNL, and the team classification was won by FDJ–Suez.

== Teams ==
Thirteen UCI Women's WorldTeams, five UCI Women's ProTeams, and three UCI Women's Continental Teams took part in the race.

UCI Women's WorldTeams

- AG Insurance–Soudal
- Canyon//SRAM zondacrypto
- FDJ–Suez
- Fenix–Deceuninck
- Human Powered Health
- Lidl–Trek
- Liv AlUla Jayco
- Movistar Team
- Roland
- Team Picnic–PostNL
- Team SD Worx–Protime
- UAE Team ADQ
- Uno-X Mobility

UCI Women's ProTeams

- Arkéa–B&B Hotels Women
- EF Education–Oatly
- Laboral Kutxa–Fundación Euskadi
- St. Michel–Preference Home–Auber93
- Winspace Orange Seal

UCI Women's Continental Teams

- BePink–Imatra–Bongioanni
- Eneicat–CMTeam
- Top Girls Fassa Bortolo

== Pre-race favorites ==
The two-time defending champion, Demi Vollering, elected not to defend her title. Her FDJ–Suez teammate Juliette Labous, winner of the 2022 edition, was expected to be a top contender. Other favorites included Marlen Reusser, a three-time European time trial champion who showed strong climbing ability during the 2025 La Vuelta Femenina, and Elisa Longo Borghini, who won the UAE Tour Women to start the season. Other riders mentioned in pre-race analysis were Lotte Kopecky, Antonia Niedermaier, Nienke Vinke, Amanda Spratt, and Ella Wyllie.

== Route ==
After lacking a significant summit finish in 2024, the 2025 route added a difficult climb to Picón Blanco, a 7.8 km climb with average grade of 9%. It is a common climb in the men's Vuelta a Burgos. The race also included an individual time trial for the first time.

Stage characteristics and winners
Stage	Date	Course	Distance	Type	Stage winner
1	22 May	Burgos to Poza de la Sal	125 km (78 mi)	Hilly stage	Lorena Wiebes (NED)
2	23 May	Villabla de Deuro to Roa de Duero	122 km (76 mi)	Hilly stage	Mie Bjørndal Ottestad (NOR)
3	24 May	Valle de Valdebezana to Picón Blanco	95 km (59 mi)	Mountain stage	Marlen Reusser (SUI)
4	25 May	Villasana de Mena to Lezana de Mena	9.4 km (5.8 mi)	Individual time trial	Marlen Reusser (SUI)
Total			351.4 km (218.3 mi)		

== Stages ==
=== Stage 1 ===
22 May 2025 — Burgos to Poza de la Sal, 125 km (78 mi)

Stage 1 Result
Rank	Rider	Team	Time
1	Lorena Wiebes (NED)	Team SD Worx–Protime	3h 22' 31"
2	Elisa Balsamo (ITA)	Lidl–Trek	+ 0"
3	Lotte Kopecky (BEL)	Team SD Worx–Protime	+ 0"
4	Elisa Longo Borghini (ITA)	UAE Team ADQ	+ 0"
5	Agnieszka Skalniak-Sójka (POL)	Canyon//SRAM zondacrypto	+ 0"
6	Fanziska Koch (GER)	Team Picnic–PostNL	+ 0"
7	Elise Chabbey (SUI)	FDJ–Suez	+ 0"
8	Ally Wollaston (NZL)	FDJ–Suez	+ 0"
9	Marlen Reusser (SUI)	Movistar Team	+ 5"
10	Katrine Aalerud (NOR)	Uno-X Mobility	+ 5"

General classification after Stage 1
Rank	Rider	Team	Time
1	Lorena Wiebes (NED)	Team SD Worx–Protime	3h 22' 21"
2	Elisa Balsamo (ITA)	Lidl–Trek	+ 4"
3	Lotte Kopecky (BEL)	Team SD Worx–Protime	+ 6"
4	Elisa Longo Borghini (ITA)	UAE Team ADQ	+ 9"
5	Agnieszka Skalniak-Sójka (POL)	Canyon//SRAM zondacrypto	+ 10"
6	Fanziska Koch (GER)	Team Picnic–PostNL	+ 10"
7	Elise Chabbey (SUI)	FDJ–Suez	+ 10"
8	Ally Wollaston (NZL)	FDJ–Suez	+ 10"
9	Steffi Häberlin (SUI)	Team SD Worx–Protime	+ 12"
10	Marlen Reusser (SUI)	Movistar Team	+ 15"

=== Stage 2 ===
23 May 2025 — Villabla de Deuro to Roa de Duero, 122 km (76 mi)

Stage 2 Result
Rank	Rider	Team	Time
1	Mie Bjørndal Ottestad (NOR)	Uno-X Mobility	3h 02' 56"
2	Marlen Reusser (SUI)	Movistar Team	+ 0"
3	Lorena Wiebes (NED)	Team SD Worx–Protime	+ 18"
4	Elisa Balsamo (ITA)	Lidl–Trek	+ 18"
5	Agnieszka Skalniak-Sójka (POL)	Canyon//SRAM zondacrypto	+ 18"
6	Lily Williams (USA)	Human Powered Health	+ 18"
7	Gladys Verhulst-Wild (FRA)	AG Insurance–Soudal	+ 18"
8	Millie Couzens (GBR)	Fenix–Deceuninck	+ 18"
9	Juliette Labous (FRA)	FDJ–Suez	+ 18"
10	Katrine Aalerud (NOR)	Uno-X Mobility	+ 18"

General classification after Stage 2
Rank	Rider	Team	Time
1	Mie Bjørndal Ottestad (NOR)	Uno-X Mobility	6h 25' 22"
2	Marlen Reusser (SUI)	Movistar Team	+ 2"
3	Lorena Wiebes (NED)	Team SD Worx–Protime	+ 9"
4	Elisa Balsamo (ITA)	Lidl–Trek	+ 17"
5	Elisa Longo Borghini (ITA)	UAE Team ADQ	+ 22"
6	Agnieszka Skalniak-Sójka (POL)	Canyon//SRAM zondacrypto	+ 23"
7	Elise Chabbey (SUI)	FDJ–Suez	+ 23"
8	Katrine Aalerud (NOR)	Uno-X Mobility	+ 28"
9	Juliette Labous (FRA)	FDJ–Suez	+ 28"
10	Yara Kastelijn (NED)	Fenix–Deceuninck	+ 28"

=== Stage 3 ===
24 May 2025 — Valle de Valdebezana to Picón Blanco, 95 km (59 mi)

Stage 3 Result
Rank	Rider	Team	Time
1	Marlen Reusser (SUI)	Movistar Team	2h 47' 35"
2	Yara Kastelijn (NED)	Fenix–Deceuninck	+ 40"
3	Elisa Longo Borghini (ITA)	UAE Team ADQ	+ 1' 17"
4	Amanda Spratt (AUS)	Lidl–Trek	+ 1' 22"
5	Petra Stiasny (SUI)	Roland	+ 1' 25"
6	Elise Chabbey (SUI)	FDJ–Suez	+ 1' 30"
7	Valentina Cavallar (AUT)	Arkéa–B&B Hotels Women	+ 1' 34"
8	Ségolène Thomas (FRA)	St. Michel–Preference Home–Auber93	+ 1' 39"
9	Barbara Malcotti (ITA)	Human Powered Health	+ 1' 48"
10	Juliette Labous (FRA)	FDJ–Suez	+ 2' 05"

General classification after Stage 3
Rank	Rider	Team	Time
1	Marlen Reusser (SUI)	Movistar Team	9h 12' 49"
2	Yara Kastelijn (NED)	Fenix–Deceuninck	+ 1' 10"
3	Elisa Longo Borghini (ITA)	UAE Team ADQ	+ 1' 43"
4	Amanda Spratt (AUS)	Lidl–Trek	+ 1' 58"
5	Elise Chabbey (SUI)	FDJ–Suez	+ 2' 01"
6	Valentina Cavallar (AUT)	Arkéa–B&B Hotels Women	+ 2' 22"
7	Barbara Malcotti (ITA)	Human Powered Health	+ 2' 33"
8	Juliette Labous (FRA)	FDJ–Suez	+ 2' 41"
9	Mie Bjørndal Ottestad (NOR)	Uno-X Mobility	+ 3' 04"
10	Mireia Benito (ESP)	AG Insurance–Soudal	+ 3' 21"

=== Stage 4 ===
25 May 2025 — Villasana de Mena to Lezana de Mena, 9.4 km (5.8 mi) (ITT)

Stage 4 Result
Rank	Rider	Team	Time
1	Marlen Reusser (SUI)	Movistar Team	12' 51"
2	Juliette Labous (FRA)	FDJ–Suez	+ 6"
3	Elisa Longo Borghini (ITA)	UAE Team ADQ	+ 8"
4	Mie Bjørndal Ottestad (NOR)	Uno-X Mobility	+ 10"
5	Lotte Kopecky (BEL)	Team SD Worx–Protime	+ 12"
6	Zoe Bäckstedt (GBR)	Canyon//SRAM zondacrypto	+ 14"
7	Katrine Aalerud (NOR)	Uno-X Mobility	+ 20"
8	Lorena Wiebes (NED)	Team SD Worx–Protime	+ 28"
9	Frankziska Koch (GER)	Team Picnic–PostNL	+ 28"
10	Ally Wollaston (NZL)	FDJ–Suez	+ 32"

General classification after Stage 4
Rank	Rider	Team	Time
1	Marlen Reusser (SUI)	Movistar Team	9h 25' 40"
2	Elisa Longo Borghini (ITA)	UAE Team ADQ	+ 1' 51"
3	Yara Kastelijn (NED)	Fenix–Deceuninck	+ 1' 58"
4	Amanda Spratt (AUS)	Lidl–Trek	+ 2' 46"
5	Juliette Labous (FRA)	FDJ–Suez	+ 2' 47"
6	Elise Chabbey (SUI)	FDJ–Suez	+ 3' 12"
7	Mie Bjørndal Ottestad (NOR)	Uno-X Mobility	+ 3' 14"
8	Valentina Cavallar (AUT)	Arkéa–B&B Hotels Women	+ 3' 27"
9	Barbara Malcotti (ITA)	Human Powered Health	+ 3' 47"
10	Katrine Aalerud (NOR)	Uno-X Mobility	+ 4' 23"

== Classification leadership table ==
Classification leadership by stage
Stage	Winner	General classification	Points classification	Mountains classification	Young rider classification	Team classification
1	Lorena Wiebes	Lorena Wiebes	Lorena Wiebes	Morgane Coston	Linda Zanetti	Team SD Worx–Protime
2	Mie Bjørndal Ottestad	Mie Bjørndal Ottestad	Lorena Wiebes	Morgane Coston	Linda Zanetti	Uno-X Mobility
3	Marlen Reusser	Marlen Reusser	Marlen Reusser	Marlen Reusser	Nienke Vinke	FDJ–Suez
4	Marlen Reusser	Marlen Reusser	Marlen Reusser	Marlen Reusser	Nienke Vinke	FDJ–Suez
Final		Marlen Reusser	Marlen Reusser	Marlen Reusser	Nienke Vinke	FDJ–Suez

== Classification standings ==
Legend
Denotes the winner of the general classification	Denotes the winner of the mountains classification
Denotes the winner of the points classification	Denotes the winner of the young rider classification

=== General classification ===
Final general classification (1-10)
Rank	Rider	Team	Time
1	Marlen Reusser (SUI)	Movistar Team	9h 25' 40"
2	Elisa Longo Borghini (ITA)	Lidl–Trek	+ 1' 51"
3	Yara Kastelijn (NED)	Fenix–Deceuninck	+ 1' 58"
4	Amanda Spratt (AUS)	Lidl–Trek	+ 2' 46"
5	Juliette Labous (FRA)	FDJ–Suez	+ 2' 47"
6	Elise Chabbey (SUI)	FDJ–Suez	+ 3' 12"
7	Mie Bjørndal Ottestad (NOR)	Uno-X Mobility	+ 3' 14"
8	Valentina Cavallar (AUT)	Arkéa–B&B Hotels Women	+ 3' 27"
9	Barbara Malcotti (ITA)	Human Powered Health	+ 3' 47"
10	Katrine Aalerud (NOR)	Uno-X Mobility	+ 4' 23"

=== Points classification ===
Final points classification (1-10)
Rank	Rider	Team	Points
1	Marlen Reusser (SUI)	Movistar Team	77
2	Lorena Wiebes (NED)	Team SD Worx–Protime	49
3	Mie Bjørndal Ottestad (NOR)	Uno-X Mobility	46
4	Elisa Longo Borghini (ITA)	Lidl–Trek	46
5	Juliette Labous (FRA)	FDJ–Suez	35
6	Elisa Balsamo (ITA)	Lidl–Trek	34
7	Lotte Kopecky (BEL)	Team SD Worx–Protime	33
8	Agnieszka Skalniak-Sójka (POL)	Canyon//SRAM zondacrypto	27
9	Yara Kastelijn (NED)	Fenix–Deceuninck	25
10	Katrine Aalerud (NOR)	Uno-X Mobility	21

=== Mountains classification ===
Final mountains classification (1-10)
Rank	Rider	Team	Points
1	Marlen Reusser (SUI)	Movistar Team	34
2	Elisa Longo Borghini (ITA)	Lidl–Trek	27
3	Yara Kastelijn (NED)	Fenix–Deceuninck	26
4	Elise Chabbey (SUI)	FDJ–Suez	18
5	Amanda Spratt (AUS)	Lidl–Trek	17
6	Petra Stiasny (SUI)	Roland	12
7	Clara Copponi (FRA)	Lidl–Trek	10
8	Valentina Cavallar (AUT)	Arkéa–B&B Hotels Women	8
9	Idoia Eraso (ESP)	Laboral Kutxa–Fundación Euskadi	8
10	Célia Gery (FRA)	FDJ–Suez	6

=== Young rider classification ===
Final young rider classification (1-10)
Rank	Rider	Team	Time
1	Nienke Vinke (NED)	Team Picnic–PostNL	9h 32' 12"
2	Célia Gery (FRA)	FDJ–Suez	+ 1' 50"
3	Ella Wyllie (NZL)	Liv AlUla Jayco	+ 4' 20"
4	Chiara Reghini (ITA)	Top Girls Fassa Bortolo	+ 4' 24"
5	Paula Blasi (ESP)	UAE Team ADQ	+ 5' 06"
6	Clémence Latimier (FRA)	Arkéa–B&B Hotels Women	+ 5' 12"
7	Gaia Segato (ITA)	BePink–Imatra–Bongioanni	+ 5' 34"
8	Angie Mariana Londoño (COL)	Eneicat–CMTeam	+ 7' 55"
9	Linda Zanetti (SUI)	Uno-X Mobility	+ 9' 41"
10	Idoia Eraso (ESP)	Laboral Kutxa–Fundación Euskadi	+ 9' 49"

=== Teams classification ===
Final teams classification (1-10)
Rank	Team	Time
1	(France) FDJ–Suez	28h 29' 32"
2	(United Arab Emirates) UAE Team ADQ	+ 6' 10"
3	(France) Arkéa–B&B Hotels Women	+ 10' 01"
4	(Netherlands) Team SD Worx–Protime	+ 10' 53"
5	(Spain) Movistar Team	+ 11' 07"
6	(Norway) Uno-X Mobility	+ 11' 16"
7	(Belgium) Fenix–Deceuninck	+ 11' 27"
8	(France) Winspace Orange Seal	+ 11' 45"
9	(Australia) Liv AlUla Jayco	+ 16' 58"
10	(Belgium) AG Insurance–Soudal	+ 18' 30"

== See also ==
- 2025 in women's road cycling
