= Uno-X Mobility =

Uno-X Mobility may refer to:

- Uno-X Mobility (men's team), a Norwegian professional cycling team that competes on the UCI World Tour
- Uno-X Mobility (women's team), a Norwegian professional cycling team that competes on the UCI Women's World Tour
