= David Gaffney (cyclist) =

Irish cyclist (born 2007)

Personal information
- Born: 31 January 2007 (age 19)

Cycling career
- Sport: Cycling
- Current team: Hagens Berman Jayco
- Discipline: Road
- Role: Rider

Amateur team
- 2025: Team 31 Specialized

Professional team
- 2026–: Hagens Berman Jayco
Medal record
Representing Ireland
Men's road cycling
European Championships
Bronze medal – third place	2025 Guilherand-Granges	Junior race

David Gaffney (born 31 January 2007) is an Irish cyclist. He rides for rides for UCI Continental team Hagens Berman Jayco. He finished third in the junior road race at the 2025 European Road Championships.

== Career ==
From Dungarvan, County Waterford, Gaffney initially competed in triathlon. He began cycle racing with Dungarvan CC. In October 2025, Gaffney became the first Irish rider to win a road race medal at the European Championships by finishing third in the junior road race in Drome-Ardeche, France, as an 18-year-old.

Having ridden for French junior team (Team 31 Specialized), he joined UCI Continental team Hagens Berman Jayco in 2026. Gaffney subsequently made his debut on the UCI World Tour in September 2026 for the Team Jayco-AlUla World Tour squad at the GP Industria & Artigianato.
