= Rebecca Koerner =

Danish cyclist (born 2000)

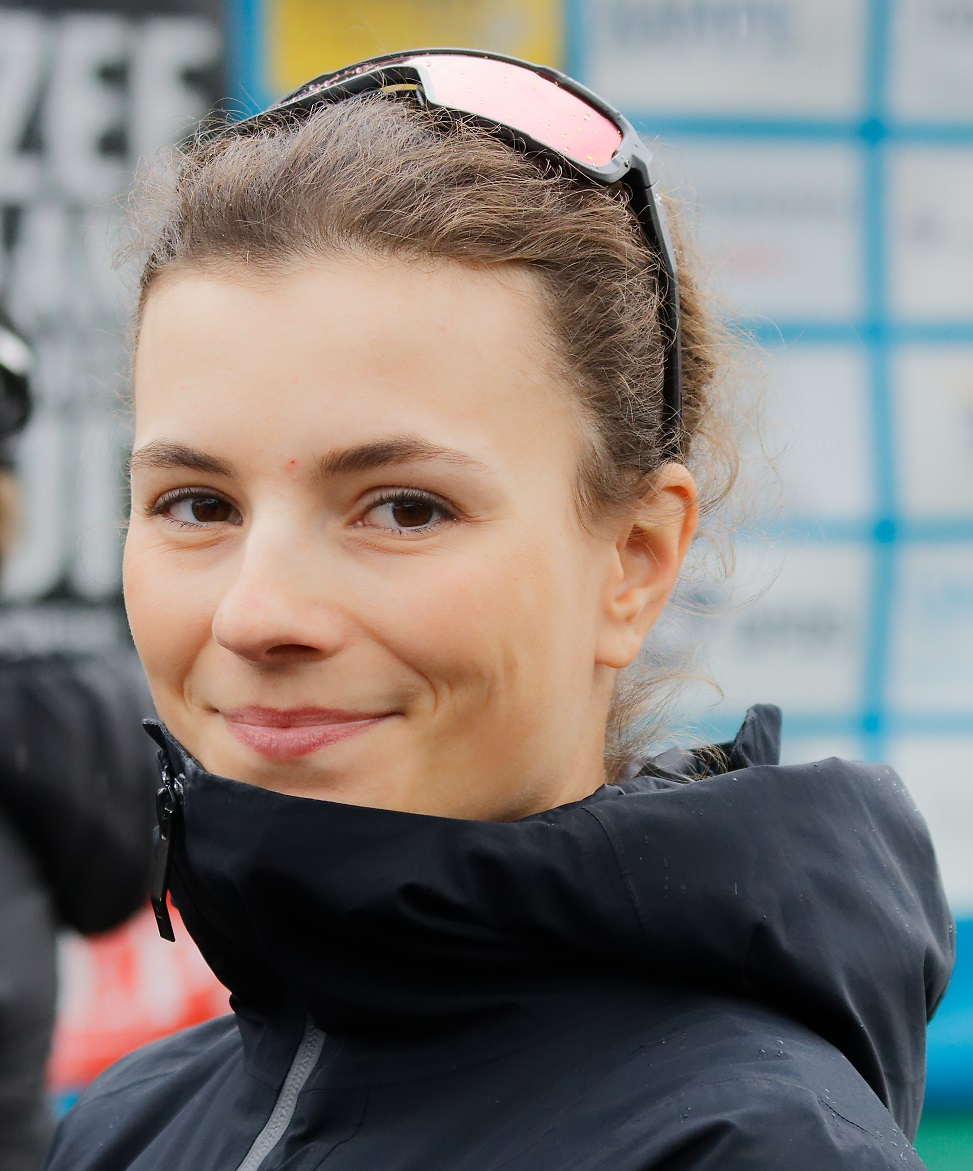
- Koerner in 2023

Personal information
- Born: 22 September 2000 (age 26) Herlev, Denmark

Cycling career
- Sport: Cycling
- Current team: Uno-X Mobility
- Discipline: Road
- Role: Rider

Amateur team
- 2021: Team ABC Dame Elite

Professional team
- 2022–: Uno-X Pro Cycling Team

Major wins
- One day races National Road Race Championships (2023)

Rebecca Koerner (born 22 September 2000) is a Danish racing cyclist, who currently rides for UCI Women's WorldTeam Uno-X Mobility.

Koerner previously competed in diving, where she was a three-time national champion before switching to cycling in 2019. She competed at the 2021 UCI Road World Championships in the road race and time trial events, and joined Uno-X Pro Cycling Team the following year. In both 2023 and 2024, she won the Danish national road race championships.

== Major results ==
2020
5th Time trial, National Road Championships
2021
5th Road race, National Road Championships
2023
National Road Championships

1st Road race
4th Time trial

2024
National Road Championships

1st Road race
2nd Time trial
