= Marte Berg Edseth =

Norwegian cyclist (born 1998)

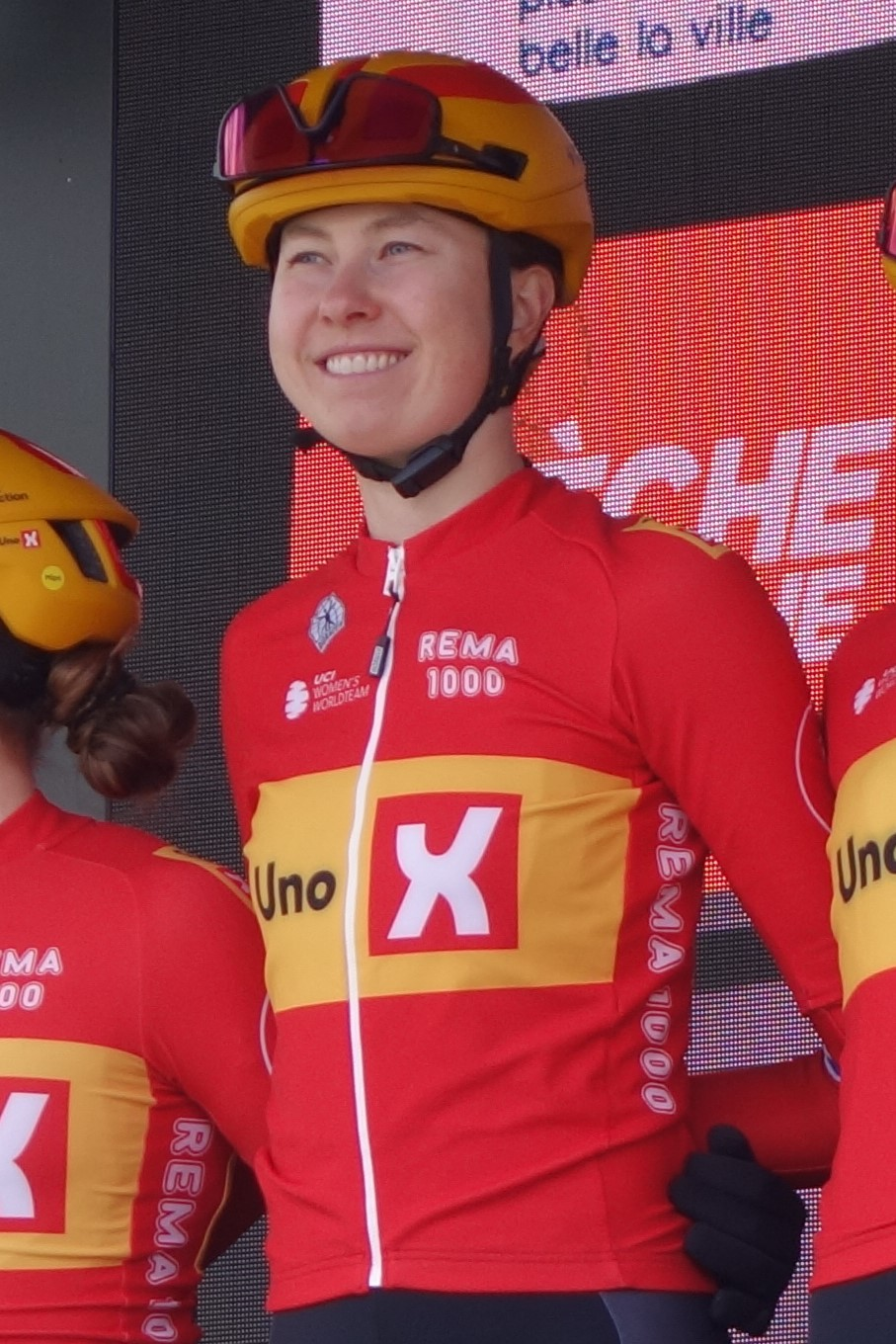
- Edseth in 2024

Personal information
- Born: 6 October 1998 (age 28) Oslo, Norway

Cycling career
- Sport: Cycling
- Current team: Uno-X Mobility
- Disciplines: Road; Cyclo-cross
- Role: Rider

Amateur team
- 2021–2022: Ringerike SK

Professional team
- 2022–: Uno-X Pro Cycling Team

Marte Berg Edseth (born 6 October 1998) is a Norwegian professional racing cyclist, who currently rides for UCI Women's WorldTeam Uno-X Mobility. She previously competed in alpine skiing before turning to cycling.

In 2024, she was selected to compete in the road race at the Summer Olympics, where she placed 30th.

== Major results ==
2022
3rd Time trial, National Road Championships
7th Ladies Tour of Estonia
2023
9th Overall Vuelta Ciclista Andalucía Elite Women
2024
4th Festival Elsy Jacobs Garnich
5th Time trial, National Road Championships
5th GP Oetingen
2025
10th Dwars door Vlaanderen
