= Chinese Cycling Association =

National governing body of cycle racing in China

The Chinese Cycling Association (in Simplified Chinese: 中国自行车运动协会; Pinyin: Zhōngguó zìxíngchē yùndòng xiéhuì) is the national governing body of cycle racing in China.

It is a member of the UCI and the Asian Cycling Confederation.
