= Anniina Ahtosalo =

Finnish cyclist

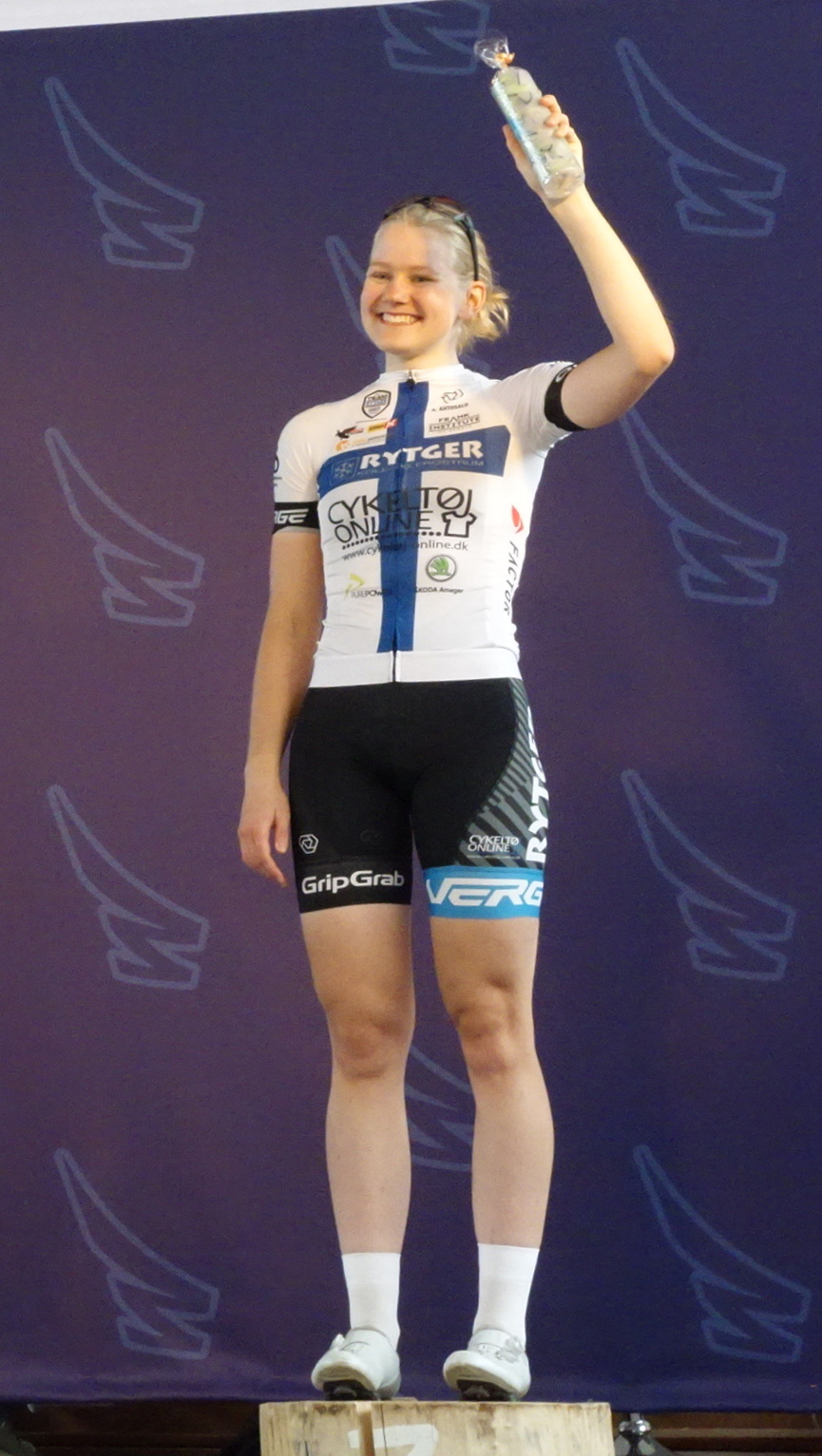

Personal information
- Nickname: The Flying Finn
- Born: 27 August 2003 (age 23)

Cycling career
- Sport: Cycling
- Current team: Uno-X Mobility
- Discipline: Road
- Role: Rider

Amateur team
- 2020–2021: Team Rytger

Professional team
- 2022–: Uno-X Pro Cycling Team

Major wins
- One day races National Road Race Championships (2022–2025) National Time Trial Championships (2022–2025)
Medal record
Women's road bicycle racing
Representing Finland
European Championships
Gold medal – first place	2024 Limburg	Under-23 time trial
Silver medal – second place	2025 Guilherand-Granges	Under-23 time trial
Bronze medal – third place	2023 Drenthe	Under-23 time trial

Anniina Ahtosalo (born 27 August 2003) is a Finnish racing cyclist, who currently rides for UCI Women's WorldTeam Uno-X Mobility.

== Major results ==
2018
National Junior Road Championships

1st Road race
1st Time trial

2019
National Junior Road Championships

1st Road race
1st Time trial

2020
National Junior Road Championships

1st Road race
1st Time trial

2021
National Junior Road Championships

1st Road race
1st Time trial

1st Piccolo Trofeo Alfredo Binda
4th Overall Tour du Gévaudan Occitanie femmes
European Junior Road Championships

5th Time trial
6th Road race

10th Overall Watersley Ladies Challenge
2022
National Road Championships

1st Road race
1st Time trial

3rd Binche–Chimay–Binche pour Dames
6th Vuelta a la Comunitat Valenciana Feminas
2023
National Road Championships

1st Road race
1st Time trial

2nd Ronde de Mouscron
3rd Time trial, European Under-23 Road Championships
3rd Binche–Chimay–Binche pour Dames
4th Omloop van Borsele
4th Trofee Maarten Wynants
5th Flanders Diamond Tour
8th Tour of Guangxi
10th Overall Tour of Chongming Island
2024
National Road Championships

1st Road race
1st Time trial

Tour de France

Held after Stages 1–3

1st Trofee Maarten Wynants
2nd Ronde de Mouscron
2nd Le Samyn des Dames
2nd Flanders Diamond Tour
2nd GP Eco-Struct
8th Classic Brugge–De Panne
2025
National Road Championships

1st Road race
1st Time trial
