= 2025 European Road Championships =

31st European Road Cycling Championships

- Location within France
- Venue: Guilherand-Granges, France
- Date: 1–5 October 2025
- Coordinates: 44°56′07″N 4°52′32″E
- Events: 14

The 2025 European Road Cycling Championships was the 31st running of the European Road Cycling Championships, which took place from 1 to 5 October 2025 in Guilherand-Granges. The event consisted of a total of 6 road races, 6 time trials and 2 relays.

== Race schedule ==
All times are in CEST (UTC+2).

Date	Timings	Event	Distance
Time trial events
1 October	9:30	Junior Women	12.2 km (7.6 mi)
1 October	10:45	Junior Men	24.0 km (14.9 mi)
1 October	12:00	Under-23 Women	24.0 km (14.9 mi)
1 October	12:45	Under-23 Men	24.0 km (14.9 mi)
1 October	14:20	Elite Women	24.0 km (14.9 mi)
1 October	15:45	Elite Men	24.0 km (14.9 mi)
2 October	11:00	Mixed team relay junior	40 km (25 mi)
2 October	14:30	Mixed team relay elite	40 km (25 mi)
Road race events
3 October	9:00	Under-23 Women	85.7 km (53.3 mi)
3 October	12:40	Junior Women	62.9 km (39.1 mi)
3 October	15:35	Junior Men	103.4 km (64.2 mi)
4 October	9:00	Under-23 Men	121.1 km (75.2 mi)
4 October	14:00	Elite Women	116.1 km (72.1 mi)
5 October	11:45	Elite Men	202.5 km (125.8 mi)

== Medal summary ==
=== Elite ===
Event	Gold		Silver		Bronze	
Men's Elite Events
Road race	Tadej Pogačar; Slovenia	4h 59'29"	Remco Evenepoel; Belgium	+31"	Paul Seixas; France	+3'41"
Time trial	Remco Evenepoel; Belgium	28:26.36	Filippo Ganna; Italy	+43.37"	Niklas Larsen; Denmark	+1:08.56"
Women's Elite Events
Road race	Demi Vollering; Netherlands	2h 57'53"	Katarzyna Niewiadoma; Poland	+1'18"	Anna van der Breggen; Netherlands	+1'24"
Time trial	Marlen Reusser; Switzerland	33:06.83	Mie Bjørndal Ottestad; Norway	+49.20"	Mischa Bredewold; Netherlands	+51.08"

=== Under-23 ===
Event	Gold		Silver		Bronze	
Men's Under-23 Events
Road race	Jarno Widar; Belgium	3h 11'58"	Maxime Decomble; France	+14"	Héctor Álvarez; Spain	+45"
Time trial	Jonathan Vervenne; Belgium	30:27.96	Matisse Van Kerckhove; Belgium	+1.66"	Adam Rafferty; Ireland	+6.05"
Women's Under-23 Events
Road race	Paula Blasi; Spain	2h 30' 28"	Eleonora Ciabocco; Italy	+ 9"	Julie Bego; France	+ 9"
Time trial	Federica Venturelli; Italy	34:17.12	Anniina Ahtosalo; Finland	+48.76"	Luca Vierstraete; Belgium	+51.66"

=== Junior ===
Event	Gold		Silver		Bronze	
Men's Junior Events
Road race	Karl Herzog; Germany	2h 44'34"	Roberto Capello; Italy	+13"	David Gaffney; Ireland	+43"
Time trial	Michiel Mouris; Netherlands	30:49.61	Conor Murphy; Ireland	+4.64"	Julius Løvstrup Birkedal; Denmark	+27.48"
Women's Junior Events
Road race	Paula Ostiz Taco; Spain	1h 46'47"	Anja Grossmann; Switzerland	s.t.	Chantal Pegolo; Italy	+3"
Time trial	Paula Ostiz Taco; Spain	18:38.00	Magdalena Leis; Germany	+ 2.41"	Oda Aune Gissinger; Norway	+10.57"

=== Mixed relay ===
Event	Gold		Silver		Bronze	
Elite team time trial	France; Bruno Armirail; Rémi Cavagna; Thibault Guernalec; Juliette Labous; Cédrine Kerbaol; Marion Borras	47' 42.70"	Italy; Filippo Ganna; Marco Frigo; Lorenzo Milesi; Federica Venturelli; Vittoria Guazzini; Elena Cecchini	+ 6.38"	Switzerland; Jan Christen; Stefan Küng; Mauro Schmid; Noemi Rüegg; Marlen Reusser; Jasmin Liechti	+ 40.11"
Junior team time trial	Norway; Kristian Heugetun; Sindre Orholm-Lønseth; Håkon Eiksund Øksnes; Oda Aune Gissinger; Marte Dolven; Ida Østbye Støvern	52' 05.12"	France; Lancelot Gayant; Luc Royer; Gabin Gicquel; Zoe Bihan; Charlotte Bouhier; Ninon Humbert	+ 34.63"	Poland; Mikolaj Legiec; Marcin Włodarski; Ksawery Gancarz; Kinga Słomka; Nadia Hartman; Anna Gaborska	+ 37.33"

== Medal table ==
* Host nation (France)

Rank	Nation	Gold	Silver	Bronze	Total
1	Belgium	3	2	1	6
2	Spain	3	0	1	4
3	Netherlands	2	0	2	4
4	Italy	1	4	1	6
5	France*	1	2	2	5
6	Germany	1	1	1	3
6	Norway	1	1	1	3
6	Switzerland	1	1	1	3
9	Slovenia	1	0	0	1
10	Ireland	0	1	1	2
10	Poland	0	1	1	2
12	Finland	0	1	0	1
13	Denmark	0	0	2	2
Totals (13 entries)		14	14	14	42
