= Mie Bjørndal Ottestad =

Norwegian cyclist

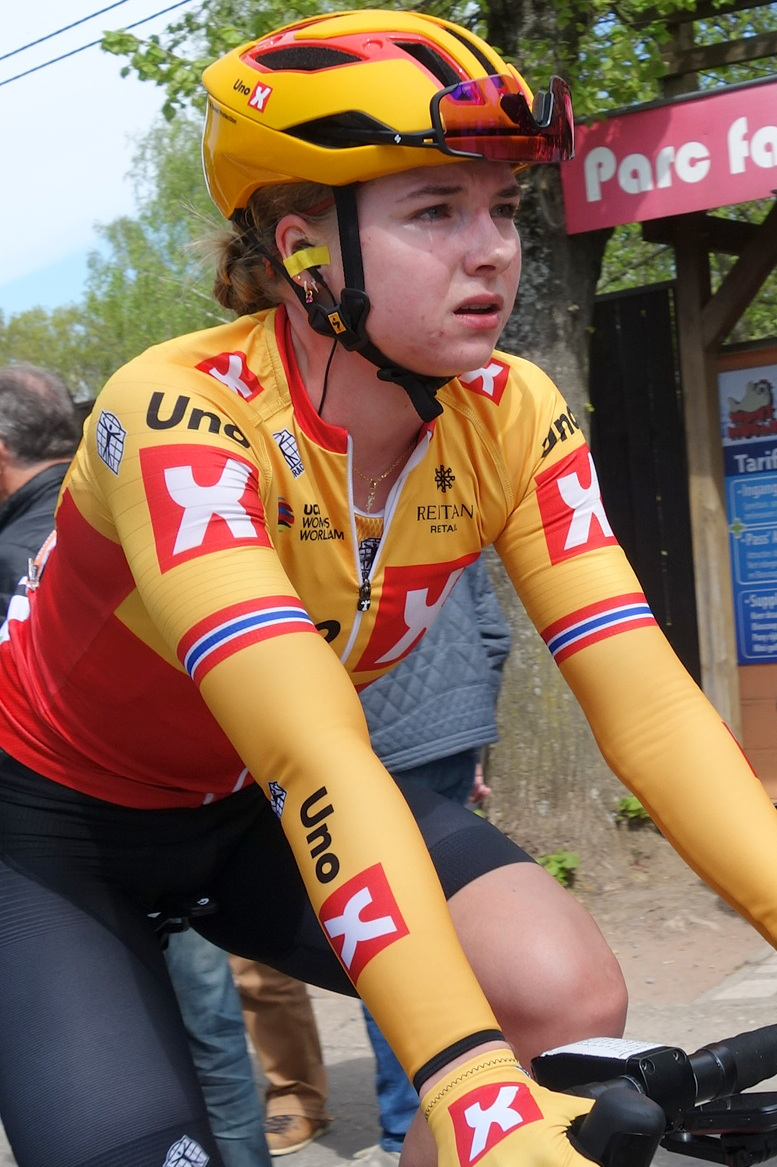
- Bjørndal Ottestad at the 2022 Flèche Wallonne

Personal information
- Full name: Mie Bjørndal Ottestad
- Born: 17 July 1997 (age 29)

Cycling career
- Sport: Cycling
- Current team: Uno-X Mobility
- Disciplines: Road; Cyclo-cross
- Role: Rider

Amateur team
- 2017–2020: Wielerclub de Sprinters Malderen

Professional teams
- 2021: Andy Schleck–CP NVST–Immo Losch
- 2022–: Uno-X Pro Cycling Team

Major wins
- One-day races and Classics National Road Race Championships (2020, 2024, 2025) National Time Trial Championships (2023)
Medal record
Women's road bicycle racing
Representing Norway
European Championships
Silver medal – second place	2025 Guilherand-Granges	Time trial

Mie Bjørndal Ottestad (Oslo, born 17 July 1997) is a Norwegian professional racing cyclist, who currently rides for UCI Women's WorldTeam Uno-X Mobility. In August 2020, she won the Norwegian National Road Race Championships. Ottestad took her first professional road victory in the 2024 Tour de Normandie Féminin in a breakway on the final and fourth stage, besting Ellen van Dijk who had led the race until the final stage.

== Major results ==
2015
3rd Road race, National Junior Road Championships
2019
1st National Cyclo-cross Championships
2nd Stockholm Cyclo-cross
2020
1st Road race, National Road Championships
2nd Täby Cyclo-cross
3rd Stockholm Cyclo-cross
2021
3rd Time trial, National Road Championships
2023
National Road Championships

1st Time trial
3rd Road race

2nd Overall Vuelta Ciclista Andalucía Elite Women

1st Stage 5

7th Overall Festival Elsy Jacobs
2024
National Road Championships

1st Road race
2nd Time trial

1st Overall Tour de Normandie
4th Overall Vuelta Ciclista Andalucía Elite Women
7th Chrono des Nations
2025
National Road Championships

1st Road race
2nd Time trial

2nd Overall Vuelta a Extremadura Femenina

1st Points classification
1st Stage 2

1st Stage 2 Vuelta a Burgos Feminas
2nd Time trial, UEC European Championships
3rd Overall Women's Tour Down Under
10th Cadel Evans Great Ocean Road Race
