= Uno-X Mobility (women's team) =

Norwegian cycling team

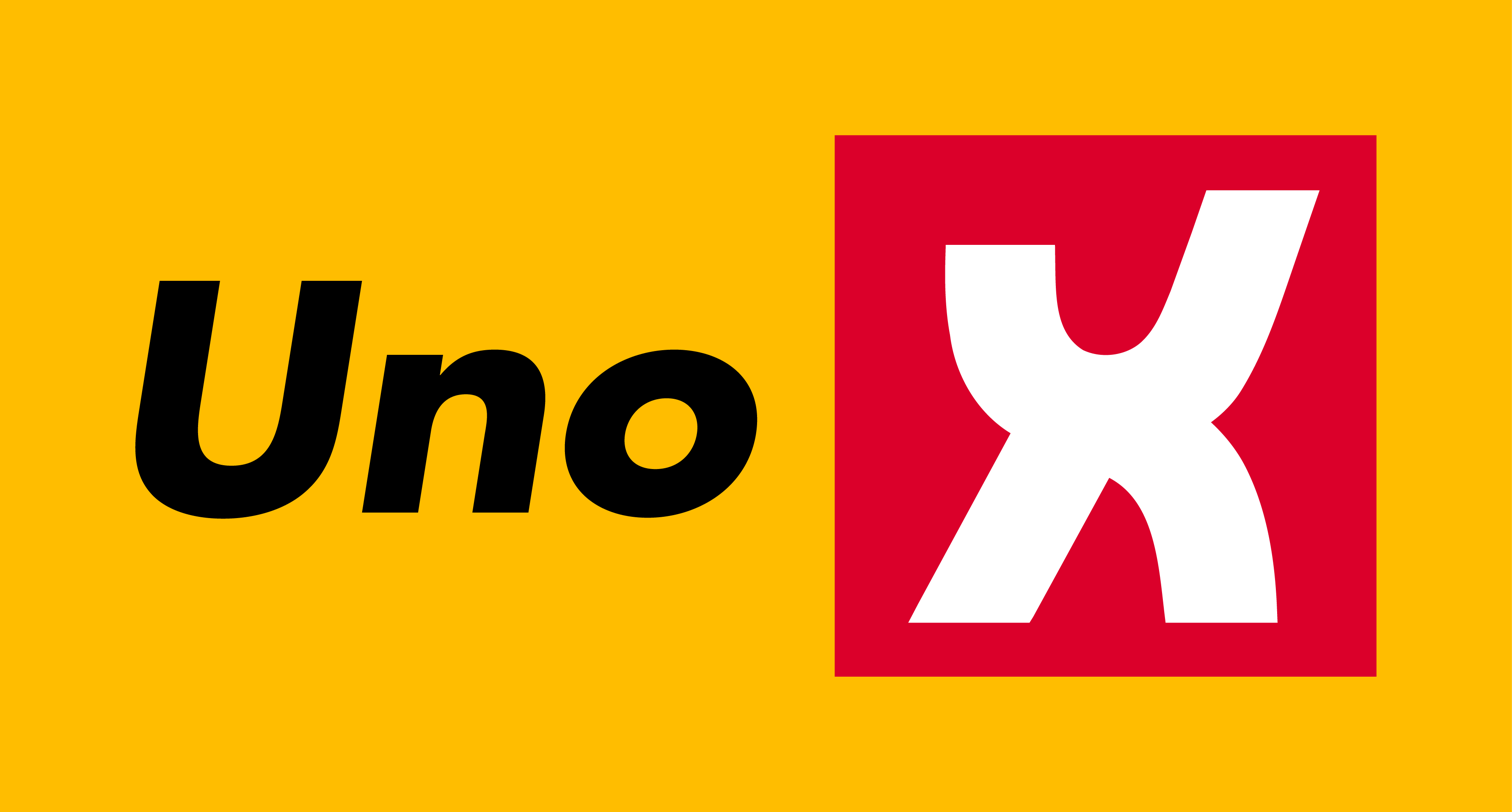

Team information
- UCI code: UXM
- Registered: Norway
- Founded: 2021
- Discipline: Road
- Status: UCI Women's WorldTeam (2022–)

Key personnel
- General manager: Thor Hushovd

Team name history
- 2022–2023 2024–: Uno-X Pro Cycling Team; Uno-X Mobility

Uno-X Mobility is a Norwegian professional Women's cycling team, which competes in the UCI Women's World Tour and other elite races. The team was founded in 2021, to compete in the 2022 season. The team is sponsored by Uno-X, who operate a chain of unmanned fuel stations throughout Norway and Denmark.

== Team roster ==
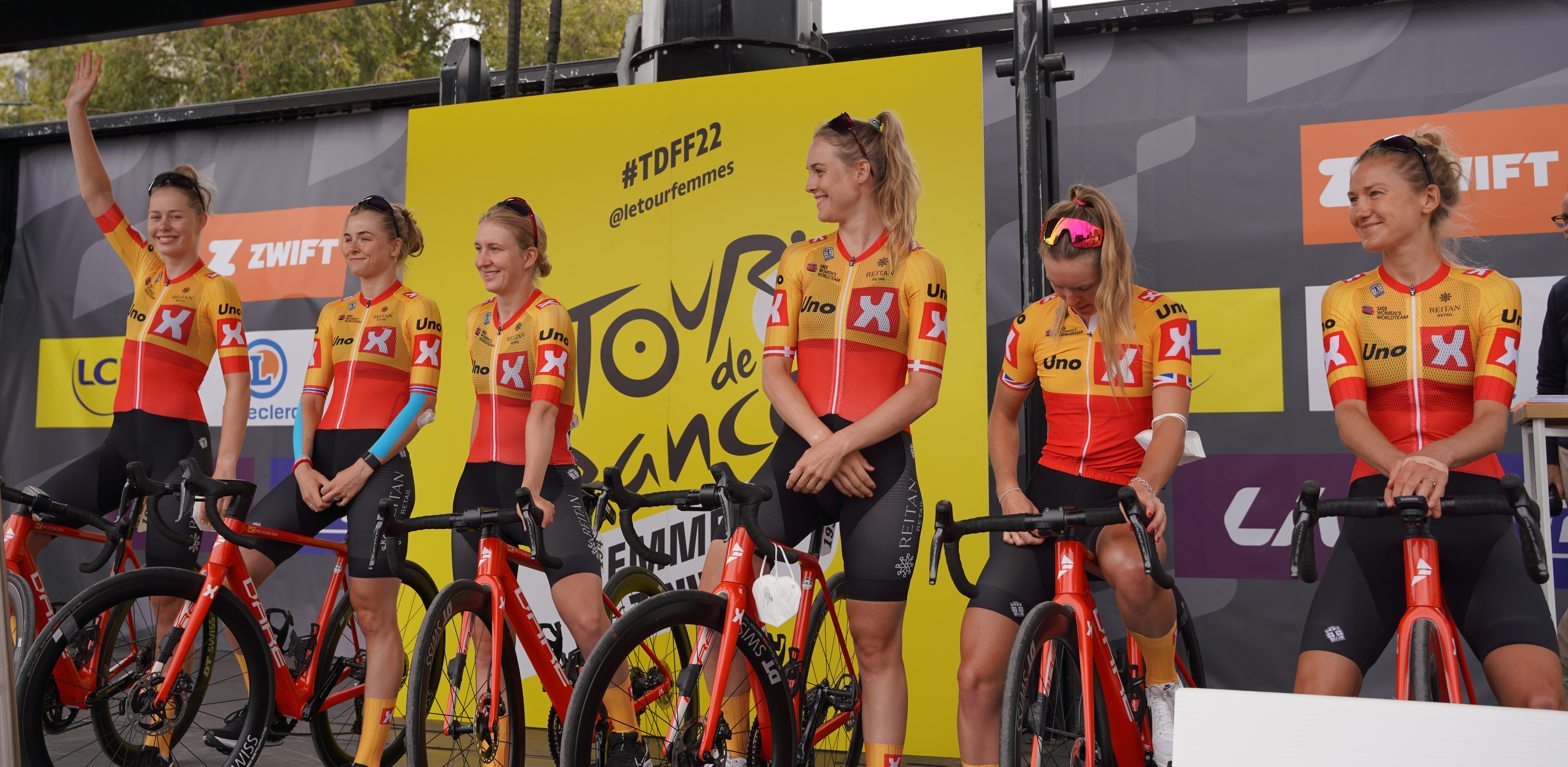
Riders at the 2022 Tour de France Femmes.

As of 26 January 2025.

Rider	Date of birth
Katrine Aalerud (NOR)	4 December 1994 (age 31)
Kamilla Aasebø (NOR)	11 June 2006 (age 20)
Anniina Ahtosalo (FIN)	27 August 2003 (age 23)
Susanne Andersen (NOR)	23 July 1998 (age 28)
Solbjørk Minke Anderson (DEN)	15 August 2004 (age 22)
Elinor Barker (GBR)	7 September 1994 (age 31)
Teuntje Beekhuis (NED)	18 August 1995 (age 31)
Marte Berg Edseth (NOR)	6 October 1998 (age 27)
Simone Boilard (CAN)	21 July 2000 (age 26)

Rider	Date of birth
Maria Giulia Confalonieri (ITA)	30 March 1993 (age 33)
Ingvild Gåskjenn (NOR)	1 July 1998 (age 28)
Mia Gjertsen (NOR)	11 April 2006 (age 20)
Alberte Greve (DEN)	16 September 2005 (age 20)
Rebecca Koerner (DEN)	22 September 2000 (age 25)
Anouska Koster (NED)	20 August 1993 (age 33)
Mie Bjørndal Ottestad (NOR)	17 July 1997 (age 29)
Anne Dorthe Ysland (NOR)	9 April 2002 (age 24)
Linda Zanetti (SUI)	10 March 2002 (age 24)

== Major wins ==
2022
Finland National Time Trial Championships, Anniina Ahtosalo
Finland National Road Race Championships, Anniina Ahtosalo
United Kingdom National Time Trial Championships, Joscelin Lowden
2023
GP Eco-Struct, Amalie Dideriksen
Finland National Time Trial Championships, Anniina Ahtosalo
Finland National Road Race Championships, Anniina Ahtosalo
Norway National Time Trial Championships, Mie Bjørndal Ottestad
Norway National Road Race Championships, Susanne Andersen
Denmark National Road Race Championships, Rebecca Koerner
2024
Overall Tour de Normandie Féminin, Mie Bjørndal Ottestad
Trofee Maarten Wynants, Anniina Ahtosalo
Mountains classification RideLondon Classique, Rebecca Koerner
Young rider classification Volta Ciclista a Catalunya Femenina, Solbjørk Minke Anderson
Finland National Time Trial Championships, Anniina Ahtosalo
Finland National Road Race Championships, Anniina Ahtosalo
Norway National Time Trial Championships, Katrine Aalerud
Norway National Road Race Championships, Mie Bjørndal Ottestad
Denmark National Road Race Championships, Rebecca Koerner
Kreiz Breizh Elites Dames, Anouska Koster

== National, continental and world champions ==
2022
Finland Time Trial, Anniina Ahtosalo
Finland Road Race, Anniina Ahtosalo
British Time Trial, Joscelin Lowden
2023
Finland Time Trial, Anniina Ahtosalo
Finland Road Race, Anniina Ahtosalo
Norway Time Trial, Mie Bjørndal Ottestad
Norway Road Race, Susanne Andersen
Denmark Road Race, Rebecca Koerner
2024
Finland Time Trial, Anniina Ahtosalo
Finland Road Race, Anniina Ahtosalo
Norway Time Trial, Katrine Aalerud
Norway Road Race, Mie Bjørndal Ottestad
Denmark Road Race, Rebecca Koerner
