= List of teams and cyclists in the 2026 La Vuelta Femenina =

List of cyclists

The following is a list of teams and cyclists who participated in the 2026 La Vuelta Femenina.

== Teams ==
All fourteen UCI Women's WorldTeams, three UCI Women's Pro Teams and one UCI Women's Continental Team made up the eighteen teams that participated in the race.

UCI Women's WorldTeams

- AG Insurance–Soudal
- Canyon//SRAM Zondacrypto
- EF Education–Oatly
- FDJ United–Suez
- Fenix–Premier Tech
- Human Powered Health
- Lidl–Trek
- Liv AlUla Jayco
- Movistar Team
- Team Picnic–PostNL
- Team SD Worx–Protime
- UAE Team ADQ
- Uno-X Mobility
- Visma–Lease a Bike

UCI Women's ProTeams

- Laboral Kutxa–Fundación Euskadi
- Lotto–Intermarché Ladies
- Mayenne Monbana My Pie

UCI Women's Continental Teams

- Vini Fantini–BePink

== Cyclists ==
Legend
No.	Starting number worn by the rider during the race
Pos.	Position in the general classification
Time	Deficit to the winner of the general classification
‡	Denotes riders born on or after 1 January 2004 eligible for the Young rider classification
	Denotes the winner of the general classification
	Denotes the winner of the points classification
	Denotes the winner of the mountains classification
	Denotes the winner of the young rider classification
	Denotes riders that represent the winner of the team classification
DNS	Denotes a rider who did not start a stage, followed by the stage before which she withdrew
DNF	Denotes a rider who did not finish a stage, followed by the stage in which she withdrew
DSQ	Denotes a rider who was disqualified from the race, followed by the stage in which this occurred
OTL	Denotes a rider finished outside the time limit, followed by the stage in which they did so
Ages correct as of Sunday 3 May 2026, the date on which the race began

=== By starting number ===
No.	Name	Nationality	Team	Age	Pos.	Time
1	Mavi García	Spain	UAE Team ADQ	42	22	+ 9' 17"
2	Paula Blasi	Spain	UAE Team ADQ	23	1	22h 17' 03"
3	Megan Jastrab	United States	UAE Team ADQ	24	81	+ 51' 22"
4	Erica Magnaldi	Italy	UAE Team ADQ	33	24	+ 10' 08"
5	Greta Marturano	Italy	UAE Team ADQ	27	DNF-6	–
6	Maëva Squiban	France	UAE Team ADQ	24	DNF-6	–
7	Karlijn Swinkels	Netherlands	UAE Team ADQ	27	63	+ 42' 49"
11	Juliette Berthet	France	FDJ United–Suez	27	5	+ 2' 36"
12	Léa Curinier	France	FDJ United–Suez	25	34	+ 14' 54"
13	Franziska Koch	Germany	FDJ United–Suez	25	45	+ 26' 10"
14	Marie Le Net	France	FDJ United–Suez	26	DNS-7	–
15	Évita Muzic	France	FDJ United–Suez	26	10	+ 3' 55"
16	Eglantine Rayer ‡	France	FDJ United–Suez	21	82	+ 51' 43"
17	Eva van Agt	Netherlands	FDJ United–Suez	29	54	+ 34' 59"
21	Mischa Bredewold	Netherlands	Team SD Worx–Protime	25	43	+ 25' 32"
22	Valentina Cavallar	Austria	Team SD Worx–Protime	28	12	+ 4' 17"
23	Lotte Kopecky	Belgium	Team SD Worx–Protime	30	50	+ 29' 47"
24	Julia Kopecký ‡	Czechia	Team SD Worx–Protime	21	49	+ 29' 12"
25	Femke Markus	Netherlands	Team SD Worx–Protime	29	36	+ 18' 28"
26	Anna van der Breggen	Netherlands	Team SD Worx–Protime	36	2	+ 24"
27	Nienke Vinke ‡	Netherlands	Team SD Worx–Protime	21	13	+ 4' 19"
31	Marion Bunel ‡	France	Visma–Lease a Bike	21	3	+ 49"
32	Pauline Ferrand-Prévot	France	Visma–Lease a Bike	34	35	+ 15' 29"
33	Lieke Nooijen	Netherlands	Visma–Lease a Bike	24	46	+ 26' 33"
34	Maud Oudeman	Netherlands	Visma–Lease a Bike	22	48	+ 27' 50"
35	Sarah Van Dam	Canada	Visma–Lease a Bike	24	23	+ 9' 35"
36	Marianne Vos	Netherlands	Visma–Lease a Bike	38	DNS-2	–
37	Imogen Wolff ‡	Great Britain	Visma–Lease a Bike	20	79	+ 49' 20"
41	Ceylin del Carmen Alvarado	Netherlands	Fenix–Premier Tech	27	51	+ 32' 50"
42	Sara Casasola	Italy	Fenix–Premier Tech	26	DNF-2	–
43	Lotte Claes	Belgium	Fenix–Premier Tech	32	16	+ 5' 25"
44	Yara Kastelijn	Netherlands	Fenix–Premier Tech	28	17	+ 6' 29"
45	Carina Schrempf	Austria	Fenix–Premier Tech	31	78	+ 49' 03"
46	Aniek van Alphen	Netherlands	Fenix–Premier Tech	27	71	+ 45' 51"
47	Inge van der Heijden	Netherlands	Fenix–Premier Tech	26	64	+ 43' 06"
51	Katarzyna Niewiadoma	Poland	Canyon//SRAM Zondacrypto	31	8	+ 3' 06"
52	Wilma Aintila ‡	Finland	Canyon//SRAM Zondacrypto	22	80	+ 50' 43"
53	Neve Bradbury	Australia	Canyon//SRAM Zondacrypto	25	DNF-6	–
54	Tiffany Cromwell	Australia	Canyon//SRAM Zondacrypto	37	DNF-7	–
55	Cecilie Uttrup Ludwig	Denmark	Canyon//SRAM Zondacrypto	30	20	+ 7' 32"
56	Maria Martins	Portugal	Canyon//SRAM Zondacrypto	26	DNF-7	–
57	Agnieszka Skalniak-Sójka	Poland	Canyon//SRAM Zondacrypto	29	58	+ 37' 29"
61	Loes Adegeest	Netherlands	Lidl–Trek	29	37	+ 18' 57"
62	Ricarda Bauernfeind	Germany	Lidl–Trek	26	15	+ 5' 19"
63	Lauretta Hanson	Australia	Lidl–Trek	31	72	+ 46' 27"
64	Riejanne Markus	Netherlands	Lidl–Trek	31	42	+ 23' 38"
65	Gaia Realini	Italy	Lidl–Trek	24	31	+ 12' 42"
66	Margot Vanpachtenbeke	Belgium	Lidl–Trek	27	DNS-3	–
67	Felicity Wilson-Haffenden ‡	Australia	Lidl–Trek	20	65	+ 43' 46"
71	Cédrine Kerbaol	France	EF Education–Oatly	24	18	+ 6' 31"
72	Henrietta Christie	New Zealand	EF Education–Oatly	24	DNF-7	–
73	Kristen Faulkner	United States	EF Education–Oatly	33	41	+ 23' 37"
74	Alexis Magner	United States	EF Education–Oatly	31	92	+ 1h 06' 24"
75	Noemi Rüegg	Switzerland	EF Education–Oatly	25	DNF-2	–
76	Alice Towers	Great Britain	EF Education–Oatly	23	53	+ 34' 59"
77	Babette van der Wolf ‡	Netherlands	EF Education–Oatly	22	77	+ 48' 44"
81	Monica Trinca Colonel	Italy	Liv AlUla Jayco	26	7	+ 2' 51"
82	Noä Jansen	Netherlands	Liv AlUla Jayco	25	47	+ 27' 12"
83	Jeanne Korevaar	Netherlands	Liv AlUla Jayco	29	59	+ 37' 43"
84	Letizia Paternoster	Italy	Liv AlUla Jayco	26	56	+ 36' 09"
85	Ruby Roseman-Gannon	Australia	Liv AlUla Jayco	27	55	+ 35' 56"
86	Josie Talbot	Australia	Liv AlUla Jayco	29	61	+ 39' 06"
87	Ella Wyllie	New Zealand	Liv AlUla Jayco	23	DNF-2	–
91	Ana Vitória Magalhães	Brazil	Movistar Team	25	66	+ 43' 55"
92	Aude Biannic	France	Movistar Team	35	60	+ 38' 33"
93	Liane Lippert	Germany	Movistar Team	28	21	+ 8' 56"
94	Sara Martín	Spain	Movistar Team	27	DNF-7	–
95	Mareille Meijer	Netherlands	Movistar Team	31	27	+ 11' 05"
96	Lucía Ruiz Pérez ‡	Spain	Movistar Team	21	75	+ 48' 13"
97	Arlenis Sierra	Cuba	Movistar Team	33	DNF-7	–
101	Urška Žigart	Slovenia	AG Insurance–Soudal	29	6	+ 2' 43"
102	Mireia Benito	Spain	AG Insurance–Soudal	29	25	+ 10' 12"
103	Shari Bossuyt	Belgium	AG Insurance–Soudal	25	62	+ 40' 31"
104	Lore De Schepper ‡	Belgium	AG Insurance–Soudal	20	11	+ 3' 56"
105	Marthe Goossens	Belgium	AG Insurance–Soudal	23	DNS-6	–
106	Ashleigh Moolman-Pasio	South Africa	AG Insurance–Soudal	40	28	+ 11' 27"
107	Julie Van De Velde	Belgium	AG Insurance–Soudal	32	70	+ 45' 44"
111	Usoa Ostolaza	Spain	Laboral Kutxa–Fundación Euskadi	28	4	+ 2' 31"
112	Alice Maria Arzuffi	Italy	Laboral Kutxa–Fundación Euskadi	31	DNF-2	–
113	Yuliia Biriukova	Ukraine	Laboral Kutxa–Fundación Euskadi	28	52	+ 33' 11"
114	Idoia Eraso	Spain	Laboral Kutxa–Fundación Euskadi	24	88	+ 57' 42"
115	Tiril Jørgensen	Norway	Laboral Kutxa–Fundación Euskadi	25	33	+ 14' 39"
116	Paula Patiño	Colombia	Laboral Kutxa–Fundación Euskadi	29	32	+ 14' 16"
117	Catalina Anais Soto	Chile	Laboral Kutxa–Fundación Euskadi	25	90	+ 59' 12"
121	Sigrid Ytterhus Haugset	Norway	Uno-X Mobility	27	19	+ 7' 25"
122	Katrine Aalerud	Norway	Uno-X Mobility	31	14	+ 4' 56"
123	Mia Gjertsen ‡	Norway	Uno-X Mobility	20	95	+ 1h 17' 57"
124	Alberte Greve ‡	Denmark	Uno-X Mobility	20	91	+ 1h 01' 17"
125	Anouska Koster	Netherlands	Uno-X Mobility	32	84	+ 53' 14"
126	Laura Tomasi	Italy	Uno-X Mobility	26	94	+ 1h 11' 45"
127	Alessia Vigilia	Italy	Uno-X Mobility	26	40	+ 21' 22"
131	Barbara Malcotti	Italy	Human Powered Health	26	9	+ 3' 50"
132	Marta Jaskulska	Poland	Human Powered Health	26	57	+ 37' 26"
133	Marit Raaijmakers	Netherlands	Human Powered Health	26	DNF-7	–
134	Katia Ragusa	Italy	Human Powered Health	28	101	+ 1h 26' 53"
135	Titia Ryo ‡	France	Human Powered Health	21	39	+ 19' 34"
136	Petra Stiasny	Switzerland	Human Powered Health	24	30	+ 12' 28"
137	Silvia Zanardi	Italy	Human Powered Health	26	102	+ 1h 49' 07"
141	Eleonora Ciabocco ‡	Italy	Team Picnic–PostNL	22	DNS-3	–
142	Audrey De Keersmaeker	Belgium	Team Picnic–PostNL	26	38	+ 19' 19"
143	Lucie Fityus	Australia	Team Picnic–PostNL	25	98	+ 1h 21' 57"
144	Mia Griffin	Ireland	Team Picnic–PostNL	27	73	+ 46' 58"
145	Juliana Londoño ‡	Colombia	Team Picnic–PostNL	21	100	+ 1h 24' 50"
146	Gaia Masetti	Italy	Team Picnic–PostNL	24	93	+ 1h 09' 16"
147	Josie Nelson	Great Britain	Team Picnic–PostNL	24	87	+ 57' 06"
151	Dina Boels ‡	Belgium	Lotto–Intermarché Ladies	21	97	+ 1h 21' 40"
152	Elisabeth Ebras ‡	Estonia	Lotto–Intermarché Ladies	21	DNF-6	–
153	Marieke Meert	Belgium	Lotto–Intermarché Ladies	26	76	+ 48' 40"
154	Annelies Nijssen	Belgium	Lotto–Intermarché Ladies	23	44	+ 25' 37"
155	Lea Lin Teutenberg	Germany	Lotto–Intermarché Ladies	26	DNF-1	–
156	Anna van Wersch	Netherlands	Lotto–Intermarché Ladies	24	74	+ 47' 35"
157	Sterre Vervloet	Belgium	Lotto–Intermarché Ladies	22	96	+ 1h 19' 59"
161	Karolina Perekitko	Poland	Mayenne Monbana My Pie	27	26	+ 10' 53"
162	Marine Allione	France	Mayenne Monbana My Pie	25	69	+ 44' 54"
163	Alice Coutinho	France	Mayenne Monbana My Pie	25	67	+ 44' 02"
164	Justine Gegu	France	Mayenne Monbana My Pie	26	89	+ 57' 46"
165	Francesca Hall	Great Britain	Mayenne Monbana My Pie	31	83	+ 53' 04"
166	Natalie Quinn	United States	Mayenne Monbana My Pie	24	DNS-6	–
167	Léa Rondel ‡	France	Mayenne Monbana My Pie	19	DNF-7	–
171	Gaia Segato ‡	Italy	Vini Fantini–BePink	22	29	+ 11' 42"
172	Sofia Arici	Italy	Vini Fantini–BePink	23	68	+ 44' 34"
173	Andrea Casagranda ‡	Italy	Vini Fantini–BePink	21	86	+ 55' 54"
174	Marina Garau	Spain	Vini Fantini–BePink	23	85	+ 54' 37"
175	Nora Jenčušová	Slovakia	Vini Fantini–BePink	24	DNF-7	–
176	Elisa Valtulini ‡	Italy	Vini Fantini–BePink	21	99	+ 1h 22' 07"
177	Delfina Dibella ‡	Argentina	Vini Fantini–BePink	19	DNF-7	–

=== By team ===
(United Arab Emirates) UAE Team ADQ (UAD)
No.	Rider	Pos.
1	Mavi García (ESP)	22
2	Paula Blasi (ESP)	1
3	Megan Jastrab (USA)	81
4	Erica Magnaldi (ITA)	24
5	Greta Marturano (ITA)	DNF-6
6	Maëva Squiban (FRA)	DNF-6
7	Karlijn Swinkels (NED)	63

(France) FDJ United–Suez (TFS)
No.	Rider	Pos.
11	Juliette Berthet (FRA)	5
12	Léa Curinier (FRA)	34
13	Franziska Koch (GER)	45
14	Marie Le Net (FRA)	DNS-7
15	Évita Muzic (FRA)	10
16	Eglantine Rayer (FRA)	82
17	Eva van Agt (NED)	54

(Netherlands) Team SD Worx–Protime (SDW)
No.	Rider	Pos.
21	Mischa Bredewold (NED)	43
22	Valentina Cavallar (AUT)	12
23	Lotte Kopecky (BEL)	50
24	Julia Kopecký (CZE)	49
25	Femke Markus (NED)	36
26	Anna van der Breggen (NED)	2
27	Nienke Vinke (NED)	13

(Netherlands) Visma–Lease a Bike (TVL)
No.	Rider	Pos.
31	Marion Bunel (FRA)	3
32	Pauline Ferrand-Prévot (FRA)	35
33	Lieke Nooijen (NED)	46
34	Maud Oudeman (NED)	48
35	Sarah Van Dam (CAN)	23
36	Marianne Vos (NED)	DNS-2
37	Imogen Wolff (GBR)	79

(Belgium) Fenix–Premier Tech (FPC)
No.	Rider	Pos.
41	Ceylin del Carmen Alvarado (NED)	51
42	Sara Casasola (ITA)	DNF-2
43	Lotte Claes (BEL)	16
44	Yara Kastelijn (NED)	17
45	Carina Schrempf (AUT)	78
46	Aniek van Alphen (NED)	71
47	Inge van der Heijden (NED)	64

(Germany) Canyon//SRAM Zondacrypto (CSZ)
No.	Rider	Pos.
51	Katarzyna Niewiadoma (POL)	8
52	Wilma Aintila (FIN)	80
53	Neve Bradbury (AUS)	DNF-6
54	Tiffany Cromwell (AUS)	DNF-7
55	Cecilie Uttrup Ludwig (DEN)	20
56	Maria Martins (POR)	DNF-7
57	Agnieszka Skalniak-Sójka (POL)	58

(Germany) Lidl–Trek (LTK)
No.	Rider	Pos.
61	Loes Adegeest (NED)	37
62	Ricarda Bauernfeind (GER)	15
63	Lauretta Hanson (AUS)	72
64	Riejanne Markus (NED)	42
65	Gaia Realini (ITA)	31
66	Margot Vanpachtenbeke (BEL)	DNS-3
67	Felicity Wilson-Haffenden (AUS)	65

(United States) EF Education–Oatly (EFO)
No.	Rider	Pos.
71	Cédrine Kerbaol (FRA)	18
72	Henrietta Christie (NZL)	DNF-7
73	Kristen Faulkner (USA)	41
74	Alexis Magner (USA)	92
75	Noemi Rüegg (SUI)	DNF-2
76	Alice Towers (GBR)	53
77	Babette van der Wolf (NED)	77

(Australia) Liv AlUla Jayco (LIV)
No.	Rider	Pos.
81	Monica Trinca Colonel (ITA)	7
82	Noä Jansen (NED)	47
83	Jeanne Korevaar (NED)	59
84	Letizia Paternoster (ITA)	56
85	Ruby Roseman-Gannon (AUS)	55
86	Josie Talbot (AUS)	61
87	Ella Wyllie (NZL)	DNF-2

(Spain) Movistar Team (MOV)
No.	Rider	Pos.
91	Ana Vitória Magalhães (BRA)	66
92	Aude Biannic (FRA)	60
93	Liane Lippert (GER)	21
94	Sara Martín (ESP)	DNF-7
95	Mareille Meijer (NED)	27
96	Lucía Ruiz Pérez (ESP)	7
97	Arlenis Sierra (CUB)	DNF-7

(Belgium) AG Insurance–Soudal (AGS)
No.	Rider	Pos.
101	Urška Žigart (SLO)	6
102	Mireia Benito (ESP)	25
103	Shari Bossuyt (BEL)	62
104	Lore De Schepper (BEL)	11
105	Marthe Goossens (BEL)	DNS-6
106	Ashleigh Moolman-Pasio (RSA)	28
107	Julie Van De Velde (BEL)	70

(Spain) Laboral Kutxa–Fundación Euskadi (LKF)
No.	Rider	Pos.
111	Usoa Ostolaza (ESP)	4
112	Alice Maria Arzuffi (ITA)	DNF-2
113	Yuliia Biriukova (UKR)	52
114	Idoia Eraso (ESP)	88
115	Tiril Jørgensen (NOR)	33
116	Paula Patiño (COL)	32
117	Catalina Anais Soto (CHI)	90

(Norway) Uno-X Mobility (UXM)
No.	Rider	Pos.
121	Sigrid Ytterhus Haugset (NOR)	19
122	Katrine Aalerud (NOR)	14
123	Mia Gjertsen (NOR)	95
124	Alberte Greve (DEN)	91
125	Anouska Koster (NED)	84
126	Laura Tomasi (ITA)	94
127	Alessia Vigilia (ITA)	40

(United States) Human Powered Health (HPH)
No.	Rider	Pos.
131	Barbara Malcotti (ITA)	9
132	Marta Jaskulska (POL)	57
133	Marit Raaijmakers (NED)	DNF-7
134	Katia Ragusa (ITA)	101
135	Titia Ryo (FRA)	39
136	Petra Stiasny (SUI)	30
137	Silvia Zanardi (ITA)	102

(Netherlands) Team Picnic–PostNL (TPP)
No.	Rider	Pos.
141	Eleonora Ciabocco (ITA)	DNS-3
142	Audrey De Keersmaeker (BEL)	38
143	Lucie Fityus (AUS)	98
144	Mia Griffin (IRL)	73
145	Juliana Londoño (COL)	100
146	Gaia Masetti (ITA)	93
147	Josie Nelson (GBR)	87

(Belgium) Lotto–Intermarché Ladies (LIL)
No.	Rider	Pos.
151	Dina Boels (BEL)	97
152	Elisabeth Ebras (EST)	DNF-6
153	Marieke Meert (BEL)	76
154	Annelies Nijssen (BEL)	44
155	Lea Lin Teutenberg (GER)	DNF-1
156	Anna van Wersch (NED)	74
157	Sterre Vervloet (BEL)	96

(France) Mayenne Monbana My Pie (MMM)
No.	Rider	Pos.
161	Karolina Perekitko (POL)	26
162	Marine Allione (FRA)	69
163	Alice Coutinho (FRA)	67
164	Justine Gegu (FRA)	89
165	Francesca Hall (GBR)	83
166	Natalie Quinn (USA)	DNS-6
167	Léa Rondel (FRA)	DNF-7

(Italy) Vini Fantini–BePink (BPK)
No.	Rider	Pos.
171	Gaia Segato (ITA)	29
172	Sofia Arici (ITA)	68
173	Andrea Casagranda (ITA)	86
174	Marina Garau (ESP)	85
175	Nora Jenčušová (SVK)	DNF-7
176	Elisa Valtulini (ITA)	99
177	Delfina Dibella (ARG)	DNF-7

=== By nationality ===
Country	No. of riders	Finished	Stage wins
Argentina	1	0	
Australia	7	5	
Austria	2	2	
Belgium	12	10	2 (Shari Bossuyt, Lotte Kopecky)
Brazil	1	1	
Canada	1	1	
Chile	1	1	
Colombia	2	2	
Cuba	1	0	
Czechia	1	1	
Denmark	2	2	
Estonia	1	0	
Finland	1	1	
France	15	12	1 (Cédrine Kerbaol)
Germany	4	3	
Great Britain	4	4	
Ireland	1	1	
Italy	18	14	
Netherlands	22	20	2 (Mischa Bredewold, Anna van der Breggen)
New Zealand	2	0	
Norway	4	4	
Poland	4	4	
Portugal	1	0	
Slovakia	1	0	
Slovenia	1	1	
South Africa	1	1	
Spain	8	7	
Switzerland	2	1	2 (Noemi Rüegg, Petra Stiasny)
Ukraine	1	1	
United States	4	3	
Total	126	102	7
