= 2026 La Vuelta Femenina, Stage 1 to Stage 7 =

Cycling race stages

The 2026 La Vuelta Femenina (officially La Vuelta Femenina by Carrefour.es) is the fourth edition of La Vuelta Femenina, a cycling stage race currently taking place in Spain. The race is taking place from 3 to 9 May 2026, and is the 16th event in the 2026 UCI Women's World Tour.

== Classification standings ==
Legend
Denotes the leader of the general classification	Denotes the leader of the young rider classification
Denotes the leader of the points classification	Denotes the leader of the team classification
Denotes the leader of the mountains classification	

== Stage 1 ==
3 May 2026 — Marín to Salvaterra de Miño, 113.9 km (70.8 mi)

Stage 1 Result
Rank	Rider	Team	Time
1	Noemi Rüegg (SUI)	EF Education–Oatly	2h 53' 50"
2	Lotte Kopecky (BEL)	Team SD Worx–Protime	+ 0"
3	Franziska Koch (GER)	FDJ United–Suez	+ 0"
4	Katarzyna Niewiadoma (POL)	Canyon//SRAM Zondacrypto	+ 0"
5	Maëva Squiban (FRA)	UAE Team ADQ	+ 0"
6	Karlijn Swinkels (NED)	UAE Team ADQ	+ 0"
7	Marianne Vos (NED)	Visma–Lease a Bike	+ 0"
8	Monica Trinca Colonel (ITA)	Liv AlUla Jayco	+ 0"
9	Pauline Ferrand-Prévot (FRA)	Visma–Lease a Bike	+ 0"
10	Loes Adegeest (NED)	Lidl–Trek	+ 0"

General classification after Stage 1
Rank	Rider	Team	Time
1	Noemi Rüegg (SUI)	EF Education–Oatly	2h 53' 40"
2	Franziska Koch (GER)	FDJ United–Suez	+ 0"
3	Lotte Kopecky (BEL)	Team SD Worx–Protime	+ 4"
4	Loes Adegeest (NED)	Lidl–Trek	+ 8"
5	Katarzyna Niewiadoma (POL)	Canyon//SRAM Zondacrypto	+ 10"
6	Maëva Squiban (FRA)	UAE Team ADQ	+ 10"
7	Karlijn Swinkels (NED)	UAE Team ADQ	+ 10"
8	Marianne Vos (NED)	Visma–Lease a Bike	+ 10"
9	Monica Trinca Colonel (ITA)	Liv AlUla Jayco	+ 10"
10	Pauline Ferrand-Prévot (FRA)	Visma–Lease a Bike	+ 10"

== Stage 2 ==
4 May 2026 — Lobios to San Cibrao das Viñas, 109.8 km (68.2 mi)

Stage 2 Result
Rank	Rider	Team	Time
1	Shari Bossuyt (BEL)	AG Insurance–Soudal	2h 55' 50"
2	Franziska Koch (GER)	FDJ United–Suez	+ 0"
3	Évita Muzic (FRA)	FDJ United–Suez	+ 0"
4	Letizia Paternoster (ITA)	Liv AlUla Jayco	+ 0"
5	Sarah Van Dam (CAN)	Visma–Lease a Bike	+ 0"
6	Anna van der Breggen (NED)	Team SD Worx–Protime	+ 0"
7	Ashleigh Moolman-Pasio (RSA)	AG Insurance–Soudal	+ 0"
8	Liane Lippert (GER)	Movistar Team	+ 0"
9	Usoa Ostolaza (ESP)	Laboral Kutxa–Fundación Euskadi	+ 0"
10	Loes Adegeest (NED)	Lidl–Trek	+ 0"

General classification after Stage 2
Rank	Rider	Team	Time
1	Franziska Koch (GER)	FDJ United–Suez	5h 49' 24"
2	Shari Bossuyt (BEL)	AG Insurance–Soudal	+ 6"
3	Lotte Kopecky (BEL)	Team SD Worx–Protime	+ 10"
4	Évita Muzic (FRA)	FDJ United–Suez	+ 12"
5	Loes Adegeest (NED)	Lidl–Trek	+ 14"
6	Maëva Squiban (FRA)	UAE Team ADQ	+ 16"
7	Anna van der Breggen (NED)	Team SD Worx–Protime	+ 16"
8	Monica Trinca Colonel (ITA)	Liv AlUla Jayco	+ 16"
9	Liane Lippert (GER)	Movistar Team	+ 16"
10	Paula Blasi (ESP)	UAE Team ADQ	+ 16"

== Stage 3 ==
5 May 2026 — Padrón to A Coruña, 121.2 km (75.3 mi)

Stage 3 Result
Rank	Rider	Team	Time
1	Cédrine Kerbaol (FRA)	EF Education–Oatly	3h 14' 17"
2	Lotte Kopecky (BEL)	Team SD Worx–Protime	+ 4"
3	Sarah Van Dam (CAN)	Visma–Lease a Bike	+ 4"
4	Liane Lippert (GER)	Movistar Team	+ 4"
5	Paula Blasi (ESP)	UAE Team ADQ	+ 4"
6	Mischa Bredewold (NED)	Team SD Worx–Protime	+ 4"
7	Loes Adegeest (NED)	Lidl–Trek	+ 4"
8	Letizia Paternoster (ITA)	Liv AlUla Jayco	+ 4"
9	Mavi García (ESP)	UAE Team ADQ	+ 4"
10	Ashleigh Moolman-Pasio (RSA)	AG Insurance–Soudal	+ 4"

General classification after Stage 3
Rank	Rider	Team	Time
1	Franziska Koch (GER)	FDJ United–Suez	9h 03' 43"
2	Lotte Kopecky (BEL)	Team SD Worx–Protime	+ 2"
3	Cédrine Kerbaol (FRA)	EF Education–Oatly	+ 4"
4	Sarah Van Dam (CAN)	Visma–Lease a Bike	+ 14"
5	Évita Muzic (FRA)	FDJ United–Suez	+ 14"
6	Loes Adegeest (NED)	Lidl–Trek	+ 16"
7	Liane Lippert (GER)	Movistar Team	+ 18"
8	Anna van der Breggen (NED)	Team SD Worx–Protime	+ 18"
9	Paula Blasi (ESP)	UAE Team ADQ	+ 18"
10	Monica Trinca Colonel (ITA)	Liv AlUla Jayco	+ 18"

== Stage 4 ==
6 May 2026 — Monforte de Lemos to Antas de Ulla, 115.6 km (71.8 mi)

Stage 4 Result
Rank	Rider	Team	Time
1	Lotte Kopecky (BEL)	Team SD Worx–Protime	3h 07' 11"
2	Anna van der Breggen (NED)	Team SD Worx–Protime	+ 0"
3	Letizia Paternoster (ITA)	Liv AlUla Jayco	+ 0"
4	Shari Bossuyt (BEL)	AG Insurance–Soudal	+ 0"
5	Franziska Koch (GER)	FDJ United–Suez	+ 0"
6	Sarah Van Dam (CAN)	Visma–Lease a Bike	+ 0"
7	Liane Lippert (GER)	Movistar Team	+ 0"
8	Arlenis Sierra (CUB)	Movistar Team	+ 0"
9	Agnieszka Skalniak-Sójka (POL)	Canyon//SRAM Zondacrypto	+ 0"
10	Karlijn Swinkels (NED)	UAE Team ADQ	+ 0"

General classification after Stage 4
Rank	Rider	Team	Time
1	Lotte Kopecky (BEL)	Team SD Worx–Protime	12h 10' 46"
2	Franziska Koch (GER)	FDJ United–Suez	+ 6"
3	Cédrine Kerbaol (FRA)	EF Education–Oatly	+ 12"
4	Anna van der Breggen (NED)	Team SD Worx–Protime	+ 20"
5	Sarah Van Dam (CAN)	Visma–Lease a Bike	+ 22"
6	Évita Muzic (FRA)	FDJ United–Suez	+ 22"
7	Loes Adegeest (NED)	Lidl–Trek	+ 24"
8	Liane Lippert (GER)	Movistar Team	+ 26"
9	Pauline Ferrand-Prévot (FRA)	Visma–Lease a Bike	+ 26"
10	Paula Blasi (ESP)	UAE Team ADQ	+ 26"

== Stage 5 ==
7 May 2026 — León to Astorga, 119.6 km (74.3 mi)

Stage 5 Result
Rank	Rider	Team	Time
1	Mischa Bredewold (NED)	Team SD Worx–Protime	2h 54' 07"
2	Lotte Kopecky (BEL)	Team SD Worx–Protime	+ 0"
3	Letizia Paternoster (ITA)	Liv AlUla Jayco	+ 0"
4	Agnieszka Skalniak-Sójka (POL)	Canyon//SRAM Zondacrypto	+ 0"
5	Shari Bossuyt (BEL)	AG Insurance–Soudal	+ 0"
6	Megan Jastrab (USA)	UAE Team ADQ	+ 0"
7	Franziska Koch (GER)	FDJ United–Suez	+ 0"
8	Katarzyna Niewiadoma (POL)	Canyon//SRAM Zondacrypto	+ 0"
9	Loes Adegeest (NED)	Lidl–Trek	+ 0"
10	Silvia Zanardi (ITA)	Human Powered Health	+ 0"

General classification after Stage 5
Rank	Rider	Team	Time
1	Lotte Kopecky (BEL)	Team SD Worx–Protime	15h 04' 47"
2	Franziska Koch (GER)	FDJ United–Suez	+ 12"
3	Cédrine Kerbaol (FRA)	EF Education–Oatly	+ 18"
4	Mischa Bredewold (NED)	Team SD Worx–Protime	+ 22"
5	Anna van der Breggen (NED)	Team SD Worx–Protime	+ 26"
6	Sarah Van Dam (CAN)	Visma–Lease a Bike	+ 28"
7	Évita Muzic (FRA)	FDJ United–Suez	+ 28"
8	Loes Adegeest (NED)	Lidl–Trek	+ 30"
9	Katarzyna Niewiadoma (POL)	Canyon//SRAM Zondacrypto	+ 32"
10	Liane Lippert (GER)	Movistar Team	+ 32"

== Stage 6 ==
8 May 2026 — Gijón/Xixón to Les Praeres de Nava, 106.5 km (66.2 mi)

Stage 6 Result
Rank	Rider	Team	Time
1	Anna van der Breggen (NED)	Team SD Worx–Protime	3h 01' 45"
2	Paula Blasi (ESP)	UAE Team ADQ	+ 8"
3	Marion Bunel (FRA)	Visma–Lease a Bike	+ 29"
4	Juliette Berthet (FRA)	FDJ United–Suez	+ 36"
5	Monica Trinca Colonel (ITA)	Liv AlUla Jayco	+ 38"
6	Évita Muzic (FRA)	FDJ United–Suez	+ 47"
7	Yara Kastelijn (NED)	Fenix–Premier Tech	+ 49"
8	Gaia Realini (ITA)	Lidl–Trek	+ 57"
9	Katrine Aalerud (NOR)	Uno-X Mobility	+ 1' 09"
10	Katarzyna Niewiadoma (POL)	Canyon//SRAM Zondacrypto	+ 1' 09"

General classification after Stage 6
Rank	Rider	Team	Time
1	Anna van der Breggen (NED)	Team SD Worx–Protime	18h 06' 48"
2	Paula Blasi (ESP)	UAE Team ADQ	+ 18"
3	Marion Bunel (FRA)	Visma–Lease a Bike	+ 41"
4	Monica Trinca Colonel (ITA)	Liv AlUla Jayco	+ 54"
5	Évita Muzic (FRA)	FDJ United–Suez	+ 59"
6	Katarzyna Niewiadoma (POL)	Canyon//SRAM Zondacrypto	+ 1' 25"
7	Usoa Ostolaza (ESP)	Laboral Kutxa–Fundación Euskadi	+ 1' 25"
8	Katrine Aalerud (NOR)	Uno-X Mobility	+ 1' 25"
9	Lore De Schepper (BEL)	AG Insurance–Soudal	+ 1' 32"
10	Lotte Claes (BEL)	Fenix–Premier Tech	+ 1' 44"

== Stage 7 ==
9 May 2026 — Pola de Laviana to L'Angliru, 132.9 km (82.6 mi)

Stage 7 Result
Rank	Rider	Team	Time
1	Petra Stiasny (SUI)	Human Powered Health	4h 09' 40"
2	Paula Blasi (ESP)	UAE Team ADQ	+ 23"
3	Juliette Berthet (FRA)	FDJ United–Suez	+ 43"
4	Marion Bunel (FRA)	Visma–Lease a Bike	+ 43"
5	Anna van der Breggen (NED)	Team SD Worx–Protime	+ 59"
6	Valentina Cavallar (AUT)	Team SD Worx–Protime	+ 1' 10"
7	Urška Žigart (SLO)	AG Insurance–Soudal	+ 1' 30"
8	Usoa Ostolaza (ESP)	Laboral Kutxa–Fundación Euskadi	+ 1' 41"
9	Barbara Malcotti (ITA)	Human Powered Health	+ 1' 56"
10	Nienke Vinke (NED)	Team SD Worx–Protime	+ 2' 16"

General classification after Stage 7
Rank	Rider	Team	Time
1	Paula Blasi (ESP)	UAE Team ADQ	22h 17' 03"
2	Anna van der Breggen (NED)	Team SD Worx–Protime	+ 24"
3	Marion Bunel (FRA)	Visma–Lease a Bike	+ 49"
4	Usoa Ostolaza (ESP)	Laboral Kutxa–Fundación Euskadi	+ 2' 31"
5	Juliette Berthet (FRA)	FDJ United–Suez	+ 2' 36"
6	Urška Žigart (SLO)	AG Insurance–Soudal	+ 2' 43"
7	Monica Trinca Colonel (ITA)	Liv AlUla Jayco	+ 2' 51"
8	Katarzyna Niewiadoma (POL)	Canyon//SRAM Zondacrypto	+ 3' 06"
9	Barbara Malcotti (ITA)	Human Powered Health	+ 3' 50"
10	Évita Muzic (FRA)	FDJ United–Suez	+ 3' 55"
