= 2025 UAE Tour Women =

Emirati cycling race

2025 UCI Women's World Tour, race 3 of 27

Race details
- Dates: 6–9 February 2025
- Stages: 4
- Distance: 540 km (340 mi)
- Winning time: 13h 14' 57"

Results
Jersey awarded to the overall winner	Winner	Elisa Longo Borghini (ITA)	(UAE Team ADQ)
	Second	Silvia Persico (ITA)	(UAE Team ADQ)
	Third	Kimberley Le Court (MRI)	(AG Insurance–Soudal)
Jersey awarded to the points classification winner	Points	Lorena Wiebes (NED)	(Team SD Worx–Protime)
Jersey awarded to the youth classification winner	Youth	Antonia Niedermaier (GER)	(Canyon//SRAM zondacrypto)
Jersey awarded to the sprints classification winner	Sprints	Lara Gillespie (IRL)	(UAE Team ADQ)
	Team	(United Arab Emirates) UAE Team ADQ	

The 2025 UAE Tour Women was a road cycling stage race that took place between 6 and 9 February in the United Arab Emirates. It was the third edition of the UAE Tour Women, and the third race of the 2025 UCI Women's World Tour.

The race was won by Italian rider Elisa Longo Borghini of UAE Team ADQ, after taking part in a five-rider breakaway on stage 2 and winning the mountainous stage 3 to Jebel Hafeet. Owing to crosswinds, stage 2 had an average speed of 48.407 kilometres per hour (30.079 mph), making it the fastest ever UCI Women's World Tour stage.

== Teams ==
Fifteen UCI Women's WorldTeams, four UCI Women's ProTeams and one UCI Women's Continental Team participated in the race.

- AG Insurance–Soudal
- Canyon//SRAM zondacrypto
- Ceratizit Pro Cycling
- FDJ–Suez
- Fenix–Deceuninck
- Human Powered Health
- Lidl–Trek
- Liv AlUla Jayco
- Movistar Team
- Roland
- Team Picnic–PostNL
- Team SD Worx–Protime
- UAE Team ADQ
- Uno-X Mobility
- Visma–Lease a Bike

UCI Women's ProTeams

- Cofidis
- EF Education–Oatly
- Laboral Kutxa–Fundación Euskadi
- St. Michel–Preference Home–Auber93

UCI Women's Continental Teams

- BePink–Imatra–Bongioanni

== Route ==
Stage characteristics and winners
Stage	Date	Course	Distance	Type	Stage winner
1	6 February	Dubai Police Officer's Club to Dubai Harbour	149 km (93 mi)	Flat stage	Lorena Wiebes (NED)
2	7 February	Al Dhafra Fort to Al Mirfa	111 km (69 mi)	Flat stage	Lorena Wiebes (NED)
3	8 February	Al Ain Qasr Al Muwaiji to Jebel Hafeet	152 km (94 mi)	Mountain stage	Elisa Longo Borghini (ITA)
4	9 February	Fatima Bint Mubarak Ladies Academy to Abu Dhabi Breakwater	128 km (80 mi)	Flat stage	Lorena Wiebes (NED)
Total			540 km (340 mi)		

== Stages ==
=== Stage 1 ===
6 February 2025 — Dubai Police Officer's Club to Dubai Harbour, 149 km (93 mi)

Stage 1 Result
Rank	Rider	Team	Time
1	Lorena Wiebes (NED)	Team SD Worx–Protime	3h 57' 37"
2	Charlotte Kool (NED)	Team Picnic–PostNL	+ 0"
3	Nienke Veenhoven (NED)	Visma–Lease a Bike	+ 0"
4	Mia Griffin (IRL)	Roland	+ 0"
5	Rachele Barbieri (ITA)	Team Picnic–PostNL	+ 0"
6	Gladys Verhulst-Wild (FRA)	AG Insurance–Soudal	+ 0"
7	Sofie van Rooijen (NED)	UAE Team ADQ	+ 0"
8	Sara Fiorin (ITA)	Ceratizit Pro Cycling	+ 0"
9	Lara Gillespie (IRL)	UAE Team ADQ	+ 0"
10	Kathrin Schweinberger (AUT)	Human Powered Health	+ 0"

General classification after Stage 1
Rank	Rider	Team	Time
1	Lorena Wiebes (NED)	Team SD Worx–Protime	3h 57' 27"
2	Charlotte Kool (NED)	Team Picnic–PostNL	+ 4"
3	Nienke Veenhoven (NED)	Visma–Lease a Bike	+ 6"
4	Cristina Tonetti (ITA)	Laboral Kutxa–Fundación Euskadi	+ 6"
5	Sylvie Swinkels (NED)	Roland	+ 6"
6	Linda Laporta (ITA)	BePink–Imatra–Bongioanni	+ 6"
7	Mia Griffin (IRL)	Roland	+ 10"
8	Rachele Barbieri (ITA)	Team Picnic–PostNL	+ 10"
9	Gladys Verhulst-Wild (FRA)	AG Insurance–Soudal	+ 10"
10	Sofie van Rooijen (NED)	UAE Team ADQ	+ 10"

=== Stage 2 ===
7 February 2025 – Al Dhafra Fort to Al Mirfa, 111 km (69 mi)

Owing to crosswinds, the stage had an average speed of 48.407 kilometres per hour (30.079 mph), making it the fastest ever UCI Women's World Tour stage.

Stage 2 Result
Rank	Rider	Team	Time
1	Lorena Wiebes (NED)	Team SD Worx–Protime	2h 17' 35"
2	Lily Williams (USA)	Human Powered Health	+ 0"
3	Lara Gillespie (IRL)	UAE Team ADQ	+ 0"
4	Elisa Longo Borghini (ITA)	UAE Team ADQ	+ 0"
5	Karlijn Swinkels (NED)	UAE Team ADQ	+ 6"
6	Marta Lach (POL)	Team SD Worx–Protime	+ 1' 26"
7	Chiara Consonni (ITA)	Canyon//SRAM zondacrypto	+ 1' 26"
8	Mylène de Zoete (NED)	Ceratizit Pro Cycling	+ 1' 26"
9	Maria Giulia Confalonieri (ITA)	Uno-X Mobility	+ 1' 26"
10	Pauline Ferrand-Prévot (FRA)	Visma–Lease a Bike	+ 1' 26"

General classification after Stage 2
Rank	Rider	Team	Time
1	Lorena Wiebes (NED)	Team SD Worx–Protime	6h 14' 52"
2	Lara Gillespie (IRL)	UAE Team ADQ	+ 13"
3	Lily Williams (USA)	Human Powered Health	+ 14"
4	Elisa Longo Borghini (ITA)	UAE Team ADQ	+ 16"
5	Karlijn Swinkels (NED)	UAE Team ADQ	+ 21"
6	Pauline Ferrand-Prévot (FRA)	Visma–Lease a Bike	+ 1' 46"
7	Mylène de Zoete (NED)	Ceratizit Pro Cycling	+ 1' 46"
8	Chiara Consonni (ITA)	Canyon//SRAM zondacrypto	+ 1' 46"
9	Alicia González Blanco (ESP)	St. Michel–Preference Home–Auber93	+ 1' 46"
10	Kimberley Le Court (MRI)	AG Insurance–Soudal	+ 1' 46"

=== Stage 3 ===
8 February 2025 – Al Ain Qasr Al Muwaiji to Jebel Hafeet, 152 km (94 mi)

Stage 3 Result
Rank	Rider	Team	Time
1	Elisa Longo Borghini (ITA)	UAE Team ADQ	3h 56' 31"
2	Silvia Persico (ITA)	UAE Team ADQ	+ 35"
3	Kimberley Le Court (MRI)	AG Insurance–Soudal	+ 35"
4	Monica Trinca Colonel (ITA)	Liv AlUla Jayco	+ 38"
5	Barbara Malcotti (ITA)	Human Powered Health	+ 38"
6	Antonia Niedermaier (GER)	Canyon//SRAM zondacrypto	+ 43"
7	Dilyxine Miermont (FRA)	Ceratizit Pro Cycling	+ 1' 29"
8	Nienke Vinke (NED)	Team Picnic–PostNL	+ 1' 30"
9	Petra Stiasny (SUI)	Roland	+ 1' 38"
10	Mavi García (ESP)	Liv AlUla Jayco	+ 1' 50"

General classification after Stage 3
Rank	Rider	Team	Time
1	Elisa Longo Borghini (ITA)	UAE Team ADQ	10h 11' 29"
2	Silvia Persico (ITA)	UAE Team ADQ	+ 2' 09"
3	Kimberley Le Court (MRI)	AG Insurance–Soudal	+ 2' 11"
4	Monica Trinca Colonel (ITA)	Liv AlUla Jayco	+ 2' 18"
5	Karlijn Swinkels (NED)	UAE Team ADQ	+ 3' 02"
6	Barbara Malcotti (ITA)	Human Powered Health	+ 3' 10"
7	Antonia Niedermaier (GER)	Canyon//SRAM zondacrypto	+ 3' 15"
8	Katrine Aalerud (NOR)	Uno-X Mobility	+ 3' 34"
9	Mareille Meijering (NED)	Movistar Team	+ 3' 40"
10	Pfeiffer Georgi (GBR)	Team Picnic–PostNL	+ 3' 42"

=== Stage 4 ===
9 February 2025 – Fatima Bint Mubarak Ladies Academy to Abu Dhabi Breakwater, 128 km (80 mi)

Stage 4 Result
Rank	Rider	Team	Time
1	Lorena Wiebes (NED)	Team SD Worx–Protime	3h 03' 28"
2	Sara Fiorin (ITA)	Ceratizit Pro Cycling	+ 0"
3	Amalie Dideriksen (DEN)	Cofidis	+ 0"
4	Silvia Zanardi (ITA)	Human Powered Health	+ 0"
5	Gladys Verhulst-Wild (FRA)	AG Insurance–Soudal	+ 0"
6	Martina Fidanza (ITA)	Visma–Lease a Bike	+ 0"
7	Anniina Ahtosalo (FIN)	Uno-X Mobility	+ 0"
8	Franziska Brauße (GER)	Ceratizit Pro Cycling	+ 0"
9	Lara Gillespie (IRL)	UAE Team ADQ	+ 0"
10	Letizia Paternoster (ITA)	Liv AlUla Jayco	+ 0"

General classification after Stage 4
Rank	Rider	Team	Time
1	Elisa Longo Borghini (ITA)	UAE Team ADQ	13h 14' 57"
2	Silvia Persico (ITA)	UAE Team ADQ	+ 2' 06"
3	Kimberley Le Court (MRI)	AG Insurance–Soudal	+ 2' 08"
4	Monica Trinca Colonel (ITA)	Liv AlUla Jayco	+ 2' 18"
5	Karlijn Swinkels (NED)	UAE Team ADQ	+ 3' 02"
6	Barbara Malcotti (ITA)	Human Powered Health	+ 3' 10"
7	Antonia Niedermaier (GER)	Canyon//SRAM zondacrypto	+ 3' 15"
8	Katrine Aalerud (NOR)	Uno-X Mobility	+ 3' 34"
9	Mareille Meijering (NED)	Movistar Team	+ 3' 40"
10	Pfeiffer Georgi (GBR)	Team Picnic–PostNL	+ 3' 42"

== Classification leadership table ==
Classification leadership by stage
Stage	Winner	General classification	Points classification	Sprints classification	Young rider classification	Team classification
1	Lorena Wiebes	Lorena Wiebes	Lorena Wiebes	Cristina Tonetti	Nienke Veenhoven	Human Powered Health
2	Lorena Wiebes	Lorena Wiebes	Lorena Wiebes	Karlijn Swinkels	Julie De Wilde	UAE Team ADQ
3	Elisa Longo Borghini	Elisa Longo Borghini	Elisa Longo Borghini	Lara Gillespie	Antonia Niedermaier	UAE Team ADQ
4	Lorena Wiebes	Elisa Longo Borghini	Lorena Wiebes	Lara Gillespie	Antonia Niedermaier	UAE Team ADQ
Final		Elisa Longo Borghini	Lorena Wiebes	Lara Gillespie	Antonia Niedermaier	UAE Team ADQ

== Classification standings ==
Legend
Denotes the winner of the general classification	Denotes the winner of the sprints classification
Denotes the winner of the points classification	Denotes the winner of the young rider classification

=== General classification ===
Final general classification (1–10)
Rank	Rider	Team	Time
1	Elisa Longo Borghini (ITA)	UAE Team ADQ	13h 14' 57"
2	Silvia Persico (ITA)	UAE Team ADQ	+ 2' 06"
3	Kimberley Le Court (MRI)	AG Insurance–Soudal	+ 2' 08"
4	Monica Trinca Colonel (ITA)	Liv AlUla Jayco	+ 2' 18"
5	Karlijn Swinkels (NED)	UAE Team ADQ	+ 3' 02"
6	Barbara Malcotti (ITA)	Human Powered Health	+ 3' 10"
7	Antonia Niedermaier (GER)	Canyon//SRAM zondacrypto	+ 3' 15"
8	Katrine Aalerud (NOR)	Uno-X Mobility	+ 3' 34"
9	Mareille Meijering (NED)	Movistar Team	+ 3' 40"
10	Pfeiffer Georgi (GBR)	Team Picnic–PostNL	+ 3' 42"

=== Points classification ===
Final points classification (1–10)
Rank	Rider	Team	Points
1	Lorena Wiebes (NED)	Team SD Worx–Protime	60
2	Elisa Longo Borghini (ITA)	UAE Team ADQ	42
3	Lara Gillespie (IRL)	UAE Team ADQ	35
4	Silvia Persico (ITA)	UAE Team ADQ	25
5	Karlijn Swinkels (NED)	UAE Team ADQ	20
6	Kimberley Le Court (MRI)	AG Insurance–Soudal	20
7	Sara Fiorin (ITA)	Ceratizit Pro Cycling	19
8	Lily Williams (USA)	Human Powered Health	18
9	Amalie Dideriksen (DEN)	Uno-X Mobility	17
10	Charlotte Kool (NED)	Team Picnic–PostNL	16

=== Sprints classification ===
Final sprints classification (1–10)
Rank	Rider	Team	Points
1	Lara Gillespie (IRL)	UAE Team ADQ	19
2	Elisa Longo Borghini (ITA)	UAE Team ADQ	13
3	Karlijn Swinkels (NED)	UAE Team ADQ	13
4	Linda Laporta (ITA)	BePink–Imatra–Bongioanni	11
5	Cristina Tonetti (ITA)	Laboral Kutxa–Fundación Euskadi	11
6	Sylvie Swinkels (NED)	Roland	10
7	Silvia Persico (ITA)	UAE Team ADQ	9
8	Kimberley Le Court (MRI)	AG Insurance–Soudal	8
9	Marta Lach (POL)	Team SD Worx–Protime	8
10	Elinor Barker (GBR)	Uno-X Mobility	8

=== Young rider classification ===
Final young rider classification (1–10)
Rank	Rider	Team	Time
1	Antonia Niedermaier (GER)	Canyon//SRAM zondacrypto	13h 18' 12"
2	Nienke Vinke (NED)	Team Picnic–PostNL	+ 47"
3	Flora Perkins (GBR)	Fenix–Deceuninck	+ 5' 49"
4	Lucía Ruiz Pérez (ESP)	Movistar Team	+ 6' 23"
5	Julie De Wilde (BEL)	Fenix–Deceuninck	+ 6' 50"
6	Gaia Segato (ITA)	BePink–Imatra–Bongioanni	+ 9' 02"
7	Julie Bego (FRA)	Cofidis	+ 9' 05"
8	Solbjørk Minke Anderson (DEN)	Uno-X Mobility	+ 11' 07"
9	Elisa Valtulini (ITA)	BePink–Imatra–Bongioanni	+ 11' 37"
10	Megan Jastrab (USA)	Team Picnic–PostNL	+ 13' 37"

=== Teams classification ===
Final team classification (1–10)
Rank	Team	Time
1	(United Arab Emirates) UAE Team ADQ	39h 49' 01"
2	(Australia) Liv AlUla Jayco	+ 12' 27"
3	(Germany) Canyon//SRAM zondacrypto	+ 13' 10"
4	(United States) Human Powered Health	+ 16' 32"
5	(Belgium) AG Insurance–Soudal	+ 16' 40"
6	(Spain) Movistar Team	+ 17' 02"
7	(Norway) Uno-X Mobility	+ 17' 03"
8	(Netherlands) Team Picnic–PostNL	+ 17' 03"
9	(Netherlands) Team SD Worx–Protime	+ 22' 01"
10	(United States) EF Education–Oatly	+ 27' 33"
