= 2026 La Vuelta Femenina =

Women's cycling race in Spain

2026 UCI Women's World Tour, race 16 of 26

Race details
- Dates: 3–9 May
- Stages: 7
- Distance: 819.5 km (509.2 mi)
- Winning time: 22h 17" 03"

Results
Jersey awarded to the overall winner	Winner	Paula Blasi (ESP)	(UAE Team ADQ)
	Second	Anna van der Breggen (NED)	(Team SD Worx–Protime)
	Third	Marion Bunel (FRA)	(Visma–Lease a Bike)
Jersey awarded to the points classification winner	Points	Lotte Kopecky (BEL)	(Team SD Worx–Protime)
Jersey awarded to the mountains classification winner	Mountains	Paula Blasi (ESP)	(UAE Team ADQ)
Jersey awarded to the young rider classification winner	Young rider	Marion Bunel (FRA)	(Visma–Lease a Bike)
Jersey awarded to the team classification winner	Team	(Netherlands) Team SD Worx–Protime	

The 2026 La Vuelta Femenina (officially La Vuelta Femenina by Carrefour.es) was the fourth edition of La Vuelta Femenina, a cycling stage race that took place in Spain. The race ran from 3 to 9 May, and was the 16th event in the 2026 UCI Women's World Tour. From 2026, more ranking points will be awarded at the Giro d'Italia Women, Tour de France Femmes and the Vuelta Femenina – elevating these races in status compared to other races in the UCI Women's World Tour.

The race was won by Spanish rider Paula Blasi of UAE Team ADQ, taking the overall victory and the mountains classification after an attack on the final stage of the race to l'Angliru. Second overall was Dutch rider Anna van der Breggen of Team SD Worx–Protime, who had taken the leaders jersey after a win on stage 6. Third overall was French rider Marion Bunel of Visma–Lease a Bike, with Bunel also winning the youth classification as the best placed rider under the age of 23. The points classification was won by Belgian rider Lotte Kopecky of Team SD Worx–Protime, with Team SD Worx–Protime also taking the teams classification.

== Teams ==
All fourteen UCI Women's WorldTeams, three UCI Women's Pro Teams and one UCI Women's Continental Team participated in the race.

UCI Women's WorldTeams

- AG Insurance–Soudal
- Canyon//SRAM Zondacrypto
- EF Education–Oatly
- FDJ United–Suez
- Fenix–Premier Tech
- Human Powered Health
- Lidl–Trek
- Liv AlUla Jayco
- Movistar Team
- Team Picnic–PostNL
- Team SD Worx–Protime
- UAE Team ADQ
- Uno-X Mobility
- Visma–Lease a Bike

UCI Women's ProTeams

- Laboral Kutxa–Fundación Euskadi
- Lotto–Intermarché Ladies
- Mayenne Monbana My Pie

UCI Women's Continental Teams

- Vini Fantini–BePink

== Route ==
Prior to the route announcement, Spanish newspaper El País reported rumours that the challenging Angliru climb would be included in the race for the first time in 2026, following previous suggestions that the climb could be included in the race in future.

The route was announced in March 2026. It comprised seven days of racing with seven stages, covering a total of 815 kilometres (506 mi) with 14,486 metres (47,526 ft) of elevation gain. The entire race was held in the north-west of the country, with the first four stages taking place in Galicia, before stage 5 in Castile and León. The race finished with two summit finishes in Asturias – stage 6 finishing at the Les Praeres de Nava (a nearly 4-kilometre (2.5 mi) climb with an average gradient of 13.5%, with a maximum gradient of 27%), and stage 7 finishing at the Alto de l'Angliru (a 12.5-kilometre (7.8 mi) climb at an average gradient of 10%, with a maximum gradient of 23%).

Overall, the route was considered to favour the climbers, owing to the inclusion of the Angliru climb, more elevation gain than the Giro d'Italia Women over a shorter distance and the absence of the team time trial that had featured in previous editions.

Stage characteristics
Stage	Date	Course	Distance	Type	Winner
1	3 May	Marín to Salvaterra de Miño	113.9 km (70.8 mi)	Hilly stage	Noemi Rüegg (SUI)
2	4 May	Lobios to San Cibrao das Viñas	109.8 km (68.2 mi)	Hilly stage	Shari Bossuyt (BEL)
3	5 May	Padrón to A Coruña	121.2 km (75.3 mi)	Flat stage	Cédrine Kerbaol (FRA)
4	6 May	Monforte de Lemos to Antas de Ulla	115.6 km (71.8 mi)	Hilly stage	Lotte Kopecky (BEL)
5	7 May	León to Astorga	119.6 km (74.3 mi)	Hilly stage	Mischa Bredewold (NED)
6	8 May	Gijón/Xixón to Les Praeres de Nava	106.5 km (66.2 mi)	Mountain stage	Anna van der Breggen (NED)
7	9 May	Pola de Laviana to L'Angliru	132.9 km (82.6 mi)	Mountain stage	Petra Stiasny (SUI)
Total			819.5 km (509.2 mi)		

== Classification leadership table ==
Stage	Winner	General classification	Points classification	Mountains classification	Young rider classification	Team classification
1	Noemi Rüegg	Noemi Rüegg	Noemi Rüegg	Maëva Squiban	Eleonora Ciabocco	UAE Team ADQ
2	Shari Bossuyt	Franziska Koch	Franziska Koch	Maëva Squiban	Lore De Schepper	UAE Team ADQ
3	Cédrine Kerbaol	Franziska Koch	Franziska Koch	Ashleigh Moolman-Pasio	Lore De Schepper	UAE Team ADQ
4	Lotte Kopecky	Lotte Kopecky	Franziska Koch	Marine Allione	Lore De Schepper	UAE Team ADQ
5	Mischa Bredewold	Lotte Kopecky	Lotte Kopecky	Alice Coutinho	Gaia Segato	Team SD Worx–Protime
6	Anna van der Breggen	Anna van der Breggen	Lotte Kopecky	Anna van der Breggen	Marion Bunel	Team SD Worx–Protime
7	Petra Stiasny	Paula Blasi	Lotte Kopecky	Paula Blasi	Marion Bunel	Team SD Worx–Protime
Final		Paula Blasi	Lotte Kopecky	Paula Blasi	Marion Bunel	Team SD Worx–Protime

== Classification standings ==
Legend
Denotes the leader of the general classification	Denotes the leader of the young rider classification
Denotes the leader of the points classification	Denotes the leader of the team classification
Denotes the leader of the mountains classification	

=== General classification ===
Final general classification (1–10)
Rank	Rider	Team	Time
1	Paula Blasi (ESP)	UAE Team ADQ	22h 17' 03"
2	Anna van der Breggen (NED)	Team SD Worx–Protime	+ 24"
3	Marion Bunel (FRA)	Visma–Lease a Bike	+ 49"
4	Usoa Ostolaza (ESP)	Laboral Kutxa–Fundación Euskadi	+ 2' 31"
5	Juliette Berthet (FRA)	FDJ United–Suez	+ 2' 36"
6	Urška Žigart (SLO)	AG Insurance–Soudal	+ 2' 43"
7	Monica Trinca Colonel (ITA)	Liv AlUla Jayco	+ 2' 51"
8	Katarzyna Niewiadoma-Phinney (POL)	Canyon//SRAM Zondacrypto	+ 3' 06"
9	Barbara Malcotti (ITA)	Human Powered Health	+ 3' 50"
10	Évita Muzic (FRA)	FDJ United–Suez	+ 3' 55"

=== Points classification ===
Final points classification (1–10)
Rank	Rider	Team	Points
1	Lotte Kopecky (BEL)	Team SD Worx–Protime	164
2	Franziska Koch (GER)	FDJ United–Suez	155
3	Anna van der Breggen (NED)	Team SD Worx–Protime	121
4	Paula Blasi (ESP)	UAE Team ADQ	85
5	Shari Bossuyt (BEL)	AG Insurance–Soudal	84
6	Mischa Bredewold (NED)	Team SD Worx–Protime	74
7	Letizia Paternoster (ITA)	Liv AlUla Jayco	73
8	Liane Lippert (GER)	Movistar Team	60
9	Cédrine Kerbaol (FRA)	EF Education–Oatly	56
10	Petra Stiasny (SUI)	Human Powered Health	51

=== Mountains classification ===
Final mountains classification (1–10)
Rank	Rider	Team	Points
1	Paula Blasi (ESP)	UAE Team ADQ	25
2	Ashleigh Moolman-Pasio (RSA)	AG Insurance–Soudal	22
3	Petra Stiasny (SUI)	Human Powered Health	20
4	Anna van der Breggen (NED)	Team SD Worx–Protime	18
5	Marion Bunel (FRA)	Visma–Lease a Bike	16
6	Juliette Berthet (FRA)	FDJ United–Suez	16
7	Liane Lippert (GER)	Movistar Team	14
8	Riejanne Markus (NED)	Lidl–Trek	14
9	Alice Coutinho (FRA)	Mayenne Monbana My Pie	12
10	Marine Allione (FRA)	Mayenne Monbana My Pie	12

=== Young rider classification ===
Final young rider classification (1–10)
Rank	Rider	Team	Time
1	Marion Bunel (FRA)	Visma–Lease a Bike	22h 17' 52"
2	Lore De Schepper (BEL)	AG Insurance–Soudal	+ 3' 07"
3	Nienke Vinke (NED)	Team SD Worx–Protime	+ 3' 30"
4	Gaia Segato (ITA)	Vini Fantini–BePink	+ 10' 53"
5	Titia Ryo (FRA)	Human Powered Health	+ 18' 45"
6	Julia Kopecký (CZE)	Team SD Worx–Protime	+ 28' 23"
7	Felicity Wilson-Haffenden (AUS)	Lidl–Trek	+ 42' 57"
8	Lucía Ruiz Pérez (ESP)	Movistar Team	+ 47' 24"
9	Babette van der Wolf (NED)	EF Education–Oatly	+ 47' 55"
10	Imogen Wolff (GBR)	Visma–Lease a Bike	+ 48' 31"

=== Team classification ===
Final team classification (1–10)
Rank	Team	Time
1	(Netherlands) Team SD Worx–Protime	66h 58' 03"
2	(France) FDJ United–Suez	+ 6' 47"
3	(Belgium) AG Insurance–Soudal	+ 7' 12"
4	(Netherlands) Visma–Lease a Bike	+ 10' 44"
5	(United Arab Emirates) UAE Team ADQ	+ 12' 19"
6	(Germany) Lidl–Trek	+ 18' 26"
7	(United States) Human Powered Health	+ 19' 47"
8	(Spain) Laboral Kutxa–Fundación Euskadi	+ 24' 32"
9	(Norway) Uno-X Mobility	+ 26' 49"
10	(Belgium) Fenix–Premier Tech	+ 36' 31"
