= Les Praeres =

- Las Praderas
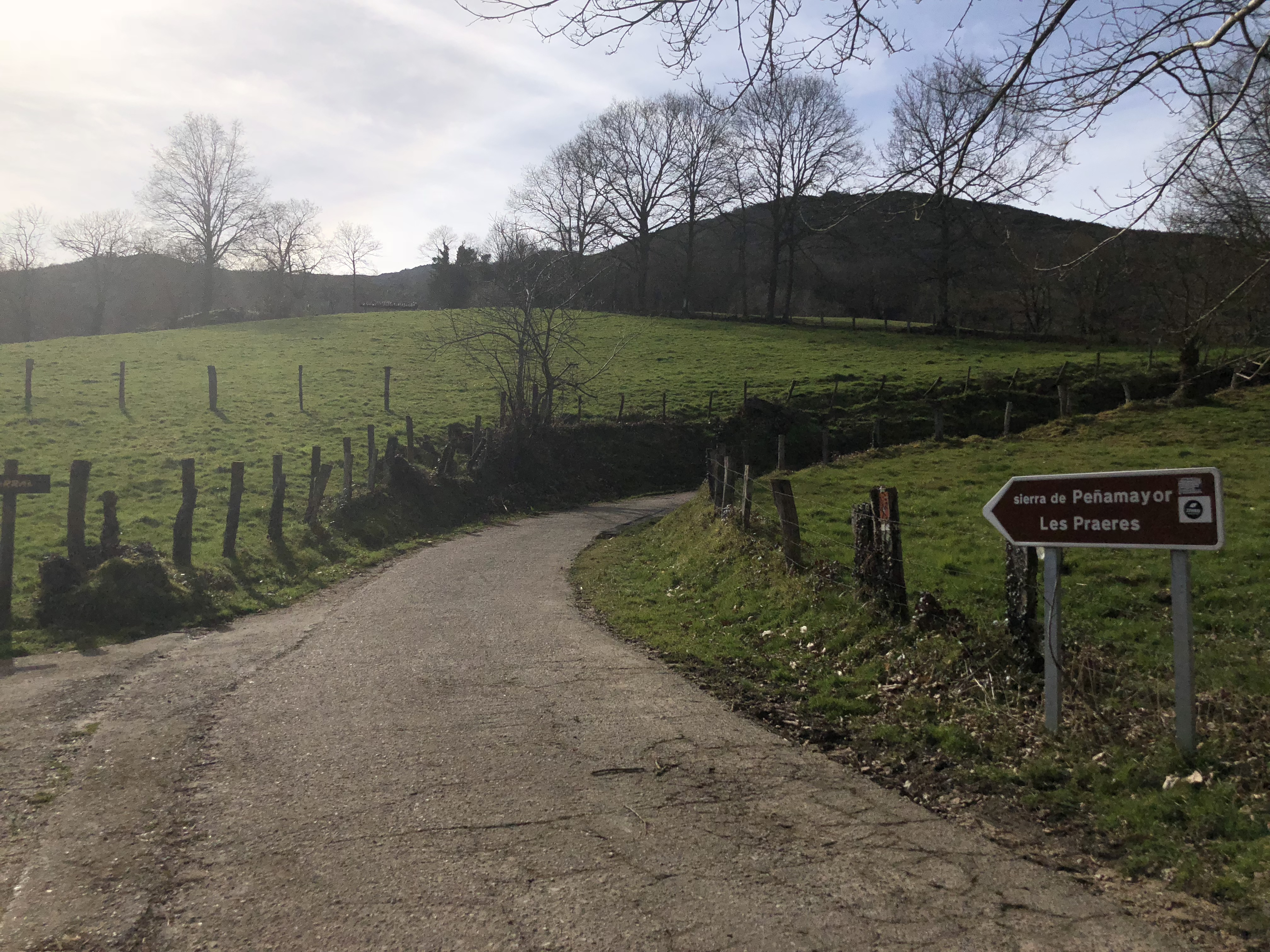
- The start of the Les Praeres road

- Location within Spain
- Elevation: 892 metres (2,927 ft)

Third Approach
- Location: Asturias, Spain
- Range: Peñamayor mountains
- Coordinates: 43.3208°N 5.4988°W

Les Praeres (in Spanish, Las Praderas; English: The Prairies) is an area of mountain grassland that reaches an altitude of 892 m (2,927 ft) above sea level, located in the Asturian municipality of Nava, in the north of Spain. The grassland is located in the middle of the Peñamayor mountain range, in an area of great environmental value.

== Sport ==
=== Cycling ===
The area gained special attention when it was announced in 2017 as the finale for a stage of the 2018 Vuelta a España. It is climbed through a narrow 5-kilometre-long (3.1 mi) road with an average gradient of 13.5%. The highest gradient, near the top, is at 23%.

Winners of the Les Praeres stage
Edition	Winner	Ref
2018	Simon Yates (GBR)	
2022	Louis Meintjes (SAF)	
2026	Anna van der Breggen (NLD)	

Fastest ascents of Les Praeres
Rank	Year	Ascent Time	Speed	Rider
1	2018	15' 22"	15.23 km/h (9.46 mph)	Simon Yates (GBR)
