= 2015 La Madrid Challenge by La Vuelta =

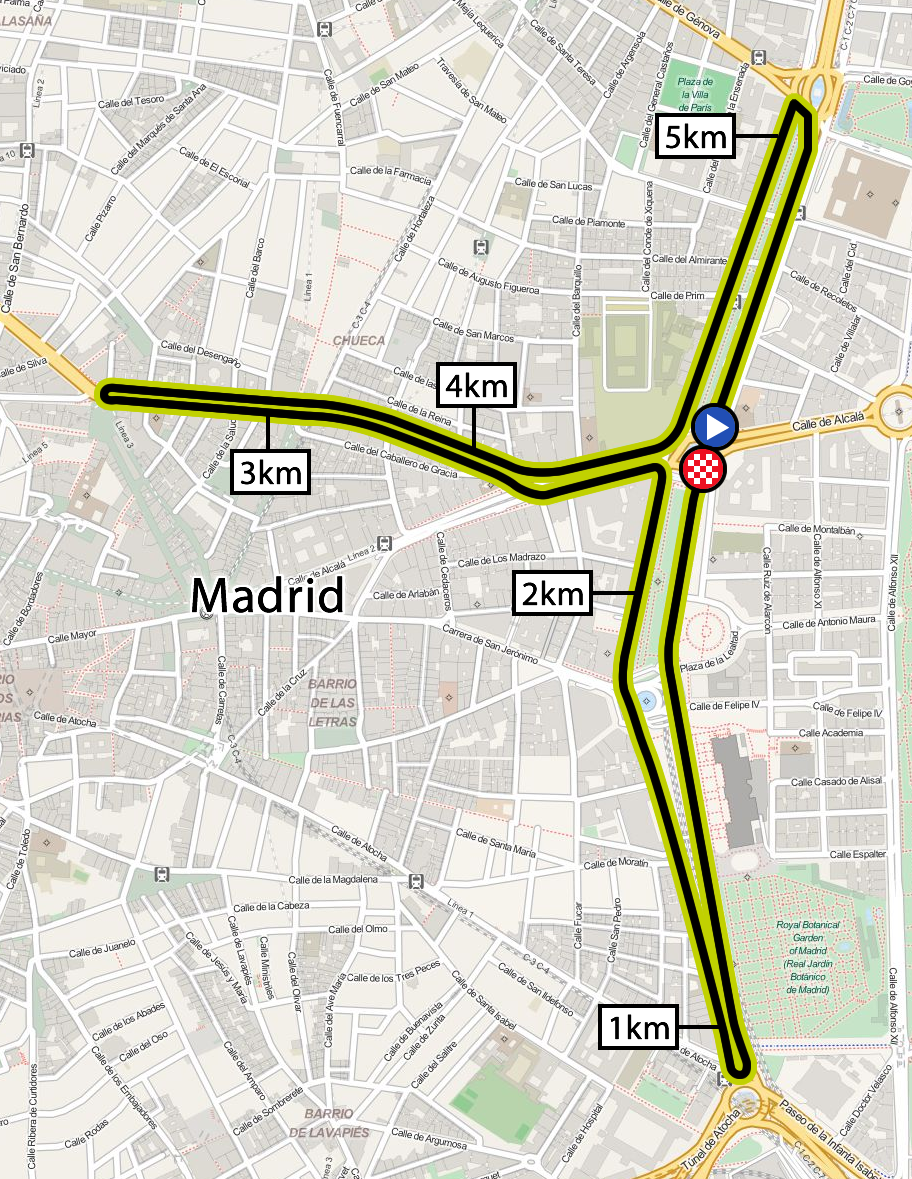
- Route of the race

Race details
- Dates: 13 September 2015
- Stages: 1
- Distance: 87 km (54.06 mi)
- Winning time: 2h 06' 21"

Results
	Winner	Shelley Olds (USA)	(Alé–Cipollini)
	Second	Giorgia Bronzini (ITA)	(Wiggle–Honda)
	Third	Kirsten Wild (NED)	(Team Hitec Products)

The 2015 La Madrid Challenge by La Vuelta was held on 13 September 2015, in Madrid, Spain. It coincided with the final day of the 2015 Vuelta a España, and was scheduled a few hours before the conclusion to the men's race. It was the first edition of La Madrid Challenge by La Vuelta. A multi-lap course, the 87 kilometres (54 mi) women's road cycling race was rated as a 1.1 category race. It was won by Shelley Olds (Alé–Cipollini), who beat Giorgia Bronzini (Wiggle–Honda) and Kirsten Wild (Team Hitec Products).

== Entry ==
Thirteen of the UCI women's team entered the race, featuring between four and seven riders. They were joined by national teams from Portugal and Spain, bringing the total entry up to 88 riders. A number of the top teams and riders did not take part in the race, as they concentrated on preparing for the 2015 UCI Road World Championships the following week.

UCI Teams

- Alé–Cipollini
- BePink–La Classica
- Bizkaia–Durango
- BTC City Ljubljana
- BZK Emakumeen Bira
- Itau Shimano Ladies Power Team
- Lointek
- Lotto–Soudal Ladies
- Poitou-Charentes.Futuroscope.86
- Team Hitec Products
- Team Liv–Plantur
- Topsport Vlaanderen–Baloise
- Wiggle–Honda
National teams
- Portugal
- Spain

== Course ==
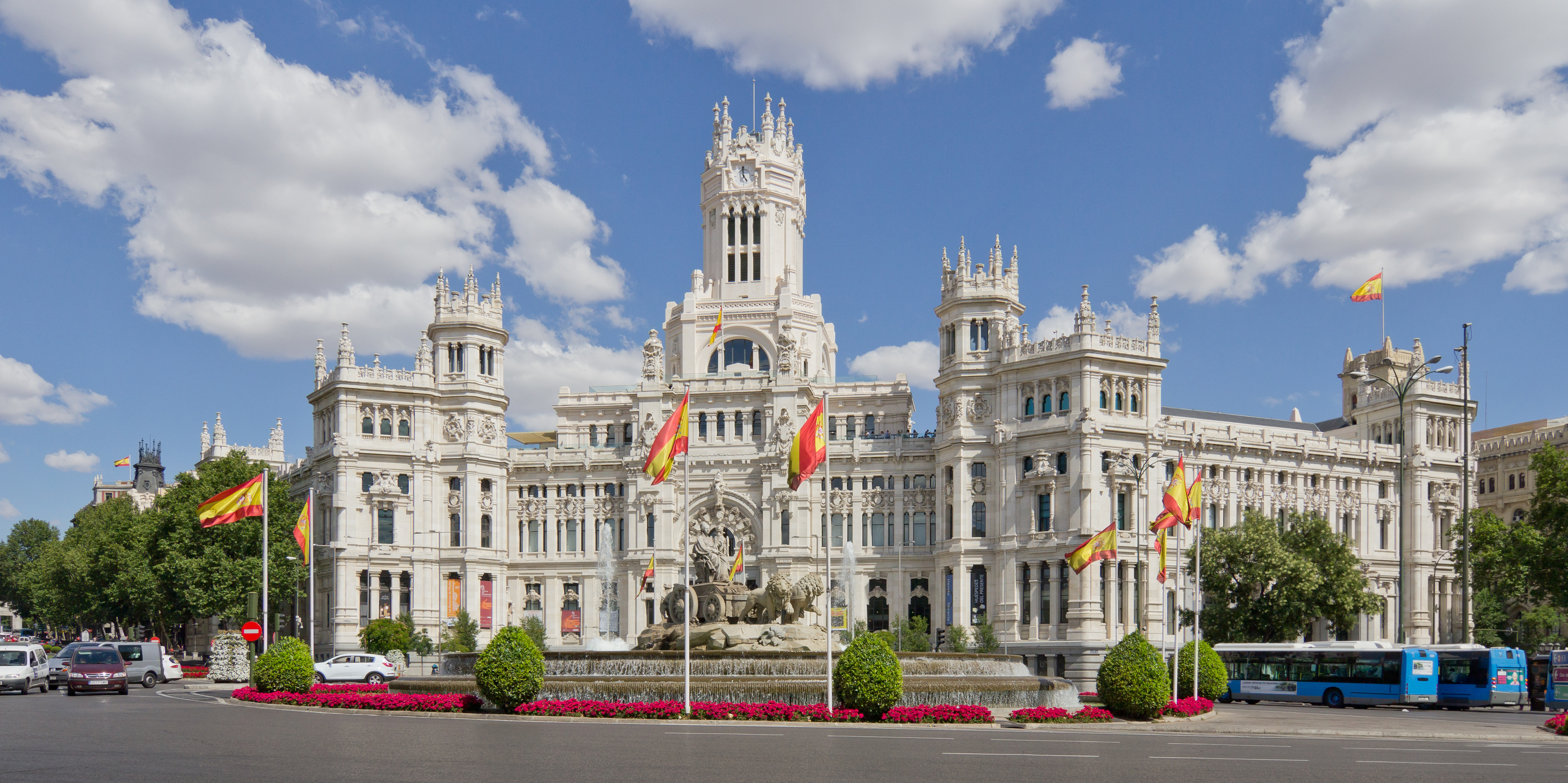
The race started and finished alongside the Cybele Palace in Plaza de Cibeles.

The women's race was scheduled on the same day as the final stage of the men's Vuelta a España, and the course followed 15 laps of the same 5.8 kilometres (3.6 mi) loop that the men would race on later. For the Madrid Challenge, the women started in the Plaza de Cibeles, and headed north along Paseo de Recoletos, before a tight hairpin turn to return to Plaza de Cibeles. The course then turned west onto Gran Vía, before another hairpin turn brought the race back to Plaza de Cibeles once more, where the course bent south down Paseo del Prado. A final hairpin took the course back to the Plaza de Cibeles to complete the lap. The course is relatively flat, favouring sprinters. On each lap, the first five riders to pass the start/finish line were awarded points in an intermediate sprint.

== Preview ==
In 2014, the Tour de France added a women's race on the final day, known as La Course by Le Tour de France, and the organisers of the Vuelta a España opted to do similar in 2015. The plans were initially put on hold due to clashes with the Chrono Champenois-Trophée Européen, Belgium Tour and Giro della Toscana, but despite this, it was given approval as a 1.1 category race.

== Results ==
Result
Rank	Rider	Team	Time
1	Shelley Olds (USA)	Alé–Cipollini	2h 06' 21"
2	Giorgia Bronzini (ITA)	Wiggle–Honda	+ 0"
3	Kirsten Wild (NED)	Team Hitec Products	+ 0"
4	Roxane Fournier (FRA)	Poitou-Charentes.Futuroscope.86	+ 0"
5	Lucy Garner (GBR)	Team Liv–Plantur	+ 0"
6	Eugenia Bujak (POL)	BTC City Ljubljana	+ 0"
7	Elena Cecchini (ITA)	Lotto–Soudal Ladies	+ 0"
8	Kelly Druyts (BEL)	Topsport Vlaanderen–Pro-Duo	+ 0"
9	Arianna Fidanza (ITA)	Alé–Cipollini	+ 0"
10	Sheyla Gutiérrez (ESP)	Lointek	+ 0"
Source: ProCyclingStats
