= Eva van Agt =

Dutch cyclist

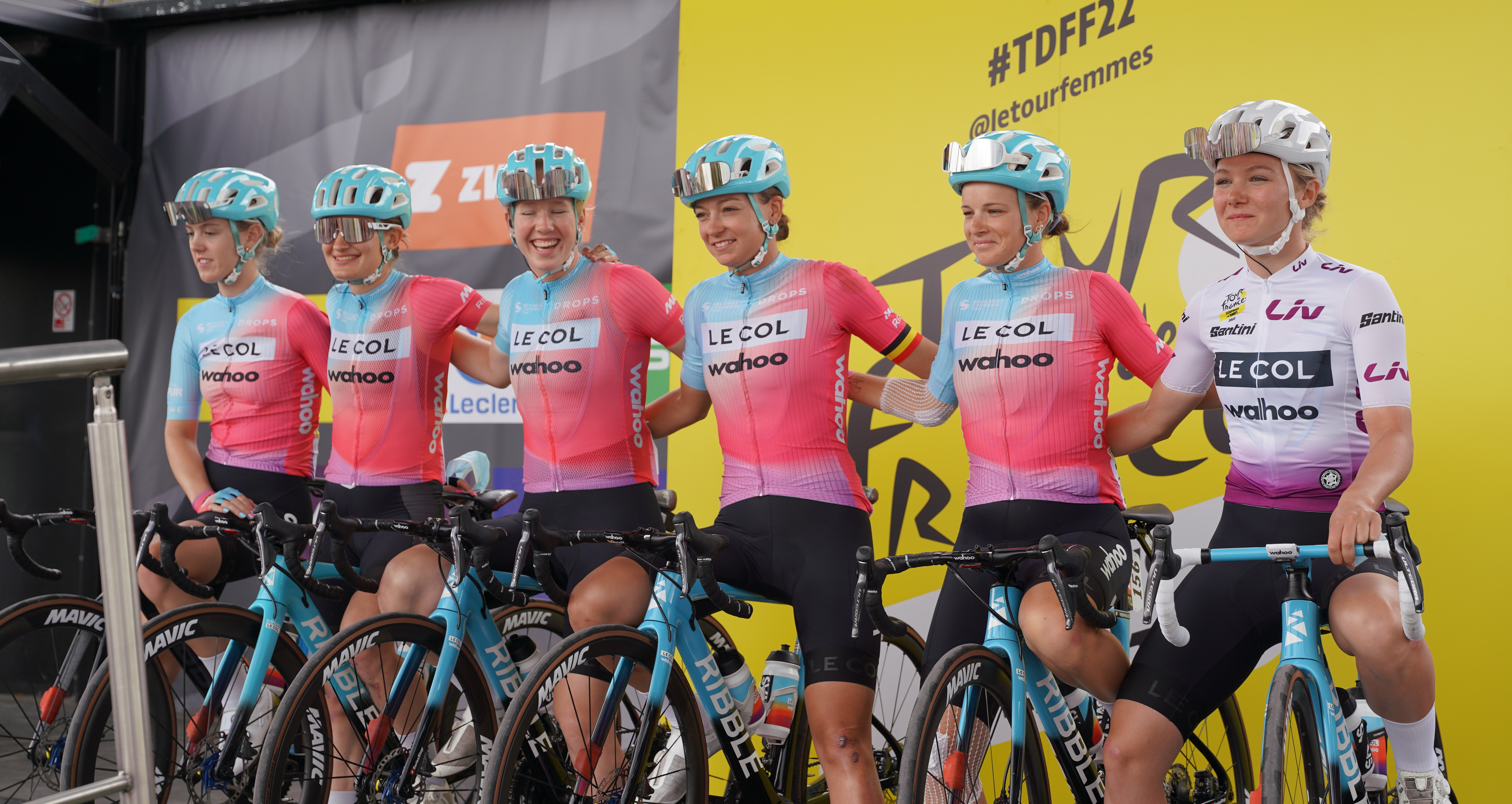
- Van Agt at the 2022 Tour de France Femmes

Personal information
- Born: 18 March 1997 (age 29) Nijmegen, Netherlands

Cycling career
- Sport: Cycling
- Current team: Visma–Lease a Bike
- Discipline: Road
- Role: Rider

Professional teams
- 2022: Le Col–Wahoo
- 2023–2025: Team Jumbo–Visma
- 2026–: FDJ United–Suez

Eva van Agt (born 18 March 1997) is a Dutch professional racing cyclist, who currently rides UCI Women's WorldTeam Visma–Lease a Bike. She has competed in three editions of the Tour de France Femmes.

She is a former field hockey player.

Her grandfather Dries van Agt was a prime minister of the Netherlands.

== Major results ==
2022
8th Grand Prix de Wallonie
2023
1st Stage 1 (TTT) La Vuelta Femenina
9th Overall Itzulia
2024
5th Egmont Cycling Race
2025
4th Overall Tour of Norway
5th Festival Elsy Jacobs à Garnich
