= Petra Stiasny =

Swiss cyclist

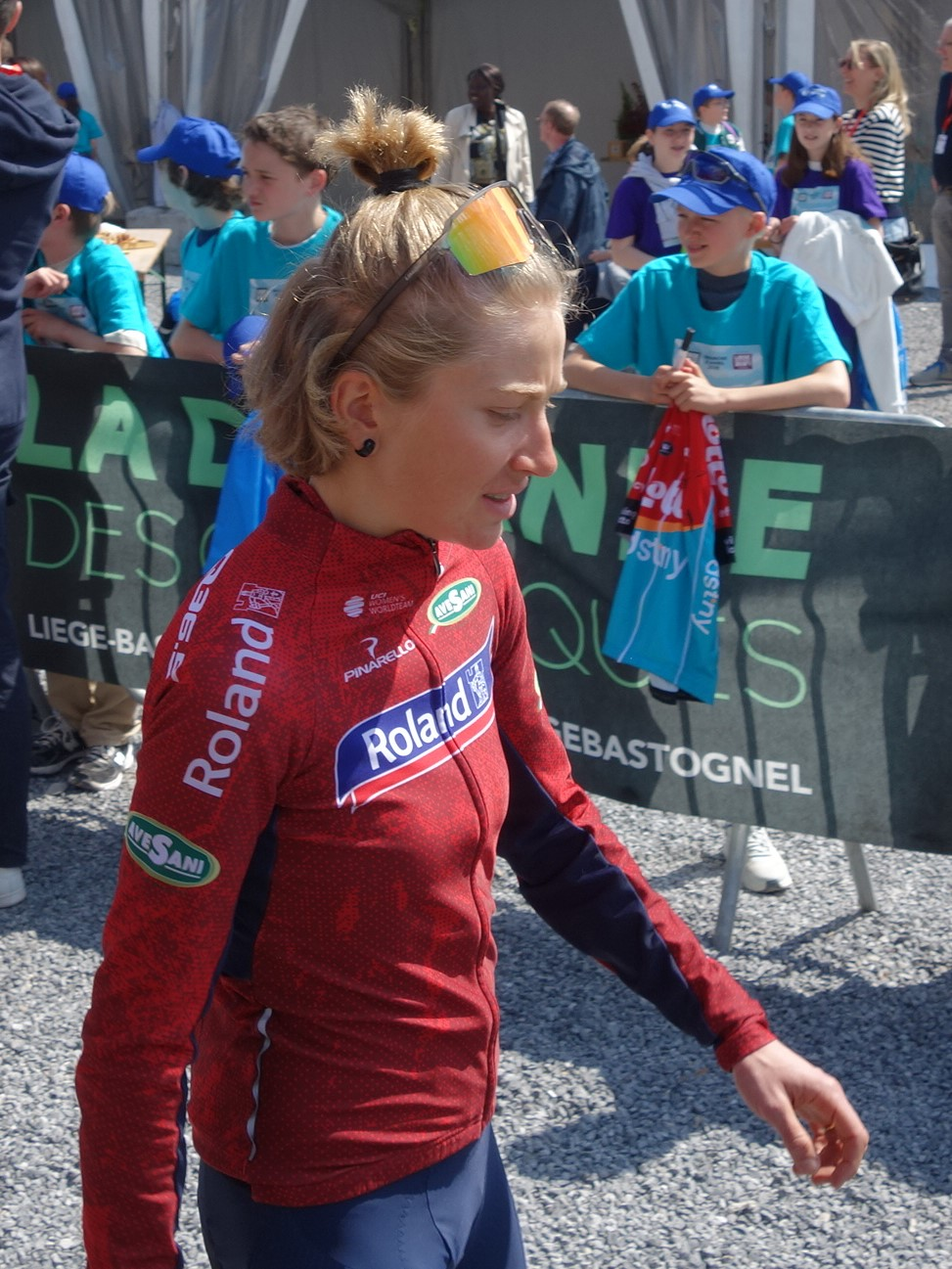
- Stiasny in 2025

Personal information
- Born: 10 September 2001 (age 25) Wädenswil, Switzerland
- Height: 1.6 m (5 ft 3 in)
- Weight: 43 kg (95 lb)

Cycling career
- Sport: Cycling
- Current team: Roland Le Dévoluy
- Discipline: Road
- Role: Rider
- Rider type: Climber

Professional teams
- 2021–2022: Cogeas–Mettler–Look
- 2023–2024: Fenix–Deceuninck
- 2025: Roland Le Dévoluy
- 2026-: Human Powered Health

Major wins
- Major Tours La Vuelta Femenina 1 individual stage (2026)

Petra Stiasny (born 10 September 2001) is a Swiss professional cyclist, who currently rides for UCI Women's WorldTeam Human Powered Health.

== Career ==
At a young age Stiasny competed in athletics and swimming. After competing in triathlons, she focused completely on cycling.

She turned professional with Continental team Cogeas–Mettler–Look in 2021. She remained with the team in 2022, when it upgraded to UCI Women's WorldTeam status.

In June, she competed in her first Grand Tour, taking part in the Giro Donne, where she finished 22nd overall. She was then invited to compete in the first Tour de France Femmes. Due to a crash and mechanical failure she finished outside the time limit on the first stage. At the end of the season, she distinguished herself in the Tour de Romandie, finishing 5th on the second stage.

She changed teams for the 2023 season, joining the Belgian team Fenix–Deceuninck. She took part in the Giro Donne again.

For the 2025 season, she returned to her first team, Roland Le Dévoluy. She began her season with the UAE Tour, where she achieved a 9th place on the queen stage, at the summit of Jebel Hafeet. In early April, she took her first professional win at the Grand Prix Boquerón, an uphill time trial in El Salvador.

For the 2026 season, Stiasny signed with Human Powered Health. In May, she surprised many by winning 1st place in the 7th stage of La Vuelta Femenina, finishing the stage (which included climbing the challenging Alto de l'Angliru, a first time addition to the Vuelta Femenina) in 4 hours and 9 minutes. Stiasny finished 30th overall in the 2026 La Vuelta Femenina.

== Major results ==
2023
4th Road race, National Road Championships
5th Overall Tour de l'Avenir Femmes
2024
5th Time trial, National Road Championships
2025
1st Grand Prix Boquerón
3rd Grand Prix Presidente
4th Alpes Grésivaudan Classic
7th Grand Prix Féminin de Chambéry
9th Overall Vuelta a El Salvador
2026
1st Stage 7 La Vuelta Femenina
