= Noemi Rüegg =

Swiss cyclist (born 2001)

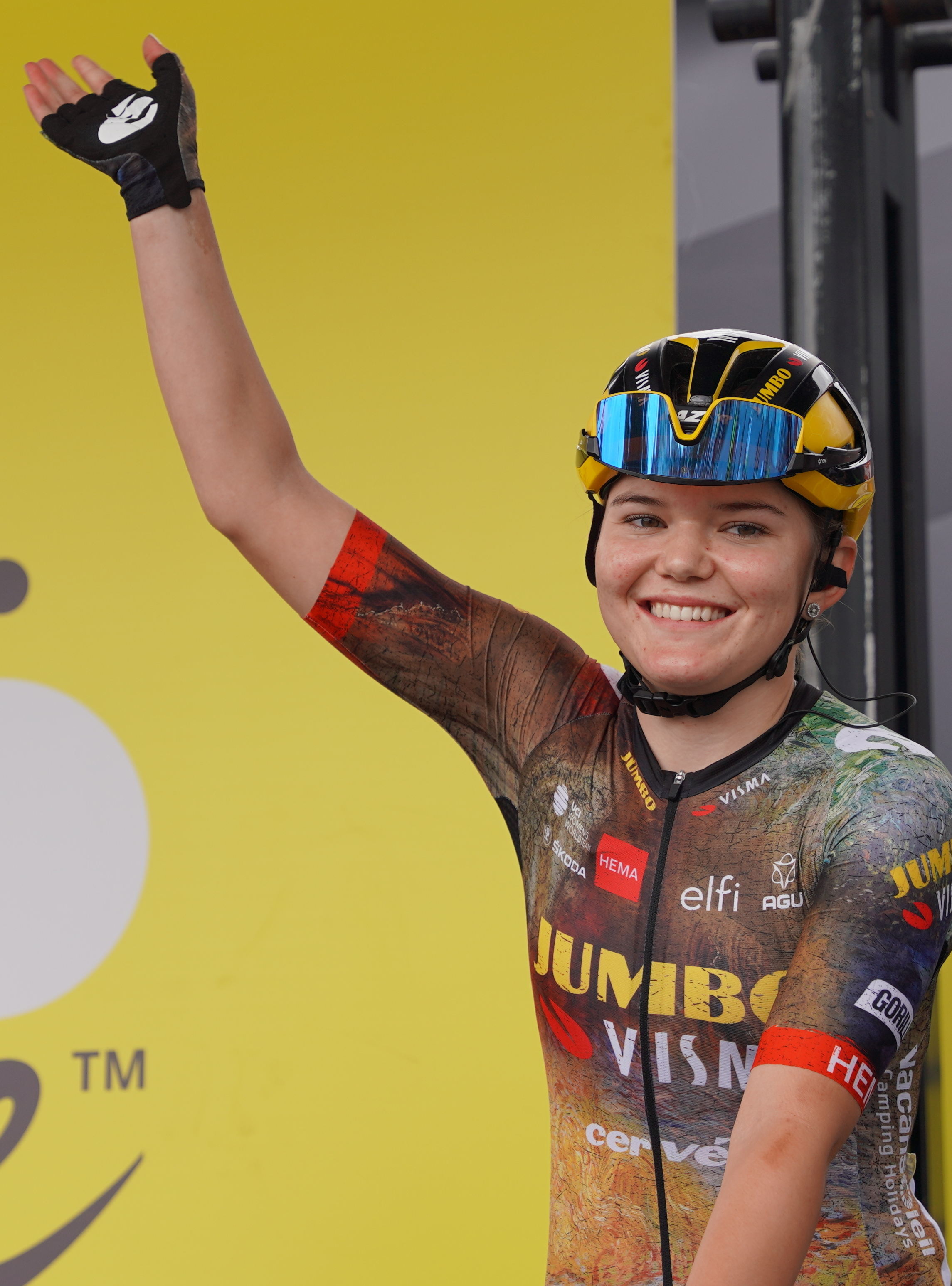
- Rüegg at the 2022 Tour de France Femmes

Personal information
- Born: 19 April 2001 (age 25) Schöfflisdorf, Switzerland

Cycling career
- Sport: Cycling
- Current team: EF Education–Oatly
- Discipline: Road
- Role: Rider

Professional teams
- 2020: Cogeas–Mettler–Look
- 2021–2022: Stade Rochelais Charente-Maritime
- 2022–2023: Team Jumbo–Visma
- 2024–: EF Education–Cannondale

Major wins
- Major Tours La Vuelta Femenina 1 individual stage (2026) Stage races Women's Tour Down Under (2025, 2026) One-day races and Classics National Road Race Championships (2024)
Medal record
Women's road bicycle racing
Representing Switzerland
World Championships
Bronze medal – third place	2025 Kigali	Mixed team relay
European Championships
Bronze medal – third place	2025 Guilherand-Granges	Mixed team relay

Noemi Rüegg (born 19 April 2001) is a Swiss professional racing cyclist, who currently rides for UCI Women's ProTeam EF Education–Oatly.

== Career ==
In 2023, she won the Swiss National Road Race Championships, later announcing that she would join the EF Education–Cannondale team from 2024. In 2025, she won her first UCI Women's World Tour event, winning the 2025 Women's Tour Down Under.

Rüegg won the opening stage of the 2026 La Vuelta Femenina, and wore the leader's jersey. On stage two, Rüegg was involved in a crash in the last 20 kilometres and abandoned the race.

== Personal life ==
Her brother Timon is also a professional cyclist.

== Major results ==
2018
National Junior Road Championships

1st Time trial
1st Road race

2019
National Junior Road Championships

1st Time trial
1st Road race

5th SwissEver GP Cham-Hagendorn
6th Road race, UCI World Junior Road Championships
2021
National Road Championships

3rd Road race
4th Time trial

5th Overall Setmana Ciclista Valenciana

1st Young rider classification

8th Grand Prix Féminin de Chambéry
2022
National Under-23 Road Championships

1st Time trial
1st Road race

2nd Road race, National Road Championships
UEC European Under-23 Road Championships

6th Road race
7th Time trial

7th Nokere Koerse voor Dames
2023
1st Time trial, National Under-23 Road Championships
1st Stage 1 (TTT) La Vuelta Femenina
3rd Overall Tour de la Semois

1st Mountains classification
1st Young rider classification

7th Road race, UEC European Under-23 Road Championships
7th Omloop van Borsele
8th Overall RideLondon Classique
9th Overall Tour de l'Avenir
2024
National Road Championships

1st Road race
3rd Time trial

1st Trofeo Felanitx-Colònia de Sant Jordi
2nd Trofeo Binissalem-Andratx
6th Overall Vuelta a Burgos
7th Road race, Olympic Games
7th Trofeo Palma
8th Durango-Durango Emakumeen Saria
2025
1st Overall Tour Down Under

1st Points classification
1st Stage 2

3rd Milan–San Remo
3rd Cadel Evans Great Ocean Road Race
3rd Tre Valli Varesine
6th Trofeo Alfredo Binda
9th Strade Bianche
2026
1st Overall Tour Down Under

1st Stage 3

1st Stage 1 La Vuelta Femenina
2nd Milan–San Remo Women
3rd Team relay, UCI Road World Championships
7th Cadel Evans Great Ocean Road Race
