= Peñamayor =

Mountain range in Spain

Coordinates: 43°17′51.66″N 5°30′3.97″W

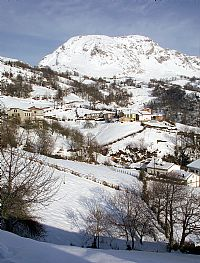
Penamayor

Peñamayor is a mountain range in Asturias, Spain. The peak "Trigueiro", has an elevation of 1,197 metres (3,927 ft). The mountain features gorges carved by the slow erosion of water on limestone. There are deciduous forests of oak, chestnut and beech. Fauna mentioned are wild boar and deer who coexist with livestock who feed on mountain slope pastures. Avifauna includes vulture. The Pra River, a tributary of the Piloña, has headwaters on the slopes of Peñamayor Peak. The mountain is named after Peñamayor Peak, which has an altitude of 1,140 metres (3,740 ft) and is located in the municipality of Nava. The mountain range is divided between the municipalities of Bimenes, Laviana, Nava, and Piloña. The “Subida a Peñamayor” is a road race held on the mountain.
