= Mareille Meijer =

Dutch cyclist (born 1995)

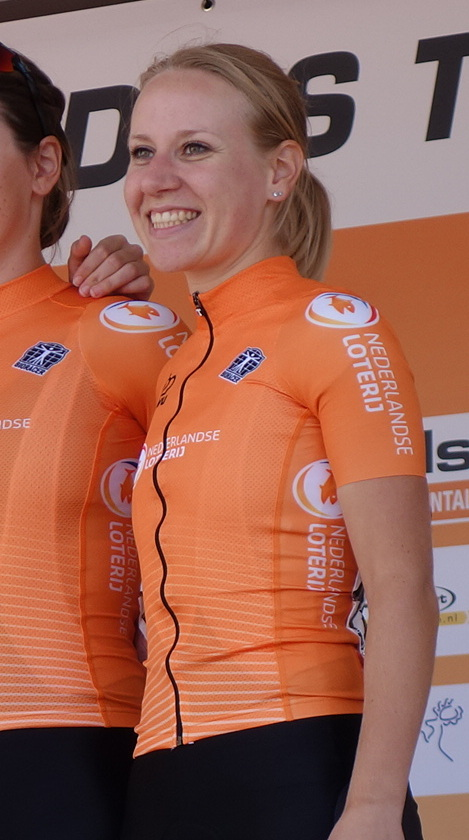
- Meijer in 2019

Personal information
- Born: Mareille Meijering; 11 March 1995 (age 31) Stadskanaal, Netherlands
- Height: 1.63 m (5 ft 4 in)
- Weight: 54 kg (119 lb)

Cycling career
- Sport: Cycling
- Current team: Movistar Team
- Discipline: Road
- Role: Rider

Amateur teams
- 2016: WV De Kannibaal Women
- 2020: Watersley Race & Development CT
- 2022: Multum Accountants Ladies

Professional teams
- 2023: Zaaf Cycling Team
- 2023–: Movistar Team

Mareille Meijer (née Meijering; born 11 March 1995) is a Dutch professional racing cyclist, who rides for UCI Women's WorldTeam Movistar Team.

== Major results ==
2017
9th 7-Dorpenomloop Aalburg
2021
8th Drentse Acht van Westerveld
2022
6th Omloop van Borsele
2023
8th Durango-Durango Emakumeen Saria
10th Overall UAE Tour
10th Vuelta a la Comunitat Valenciana Feminas
2024
1st Overall Vuelta Extremadura Féminas

1st Points classification
1st Stage 2

3rd Grand Prix Stuttgart & Region
4th Overall AG Tour de la Semois
5th Gran Premio Ciudad de Eibar
5th Women Cycling Pro Costa De Almería
5th Giro dell'Emilia Internazionale Donne Elite
6th Durango-Durango Emakumeen Saria
9th Overall UAE Tour
2025
9th Trofeo Binissalem-Andratx
9th Overall UAE Tour Women
