= Sylvie Swinkels =

Dutch cyclist

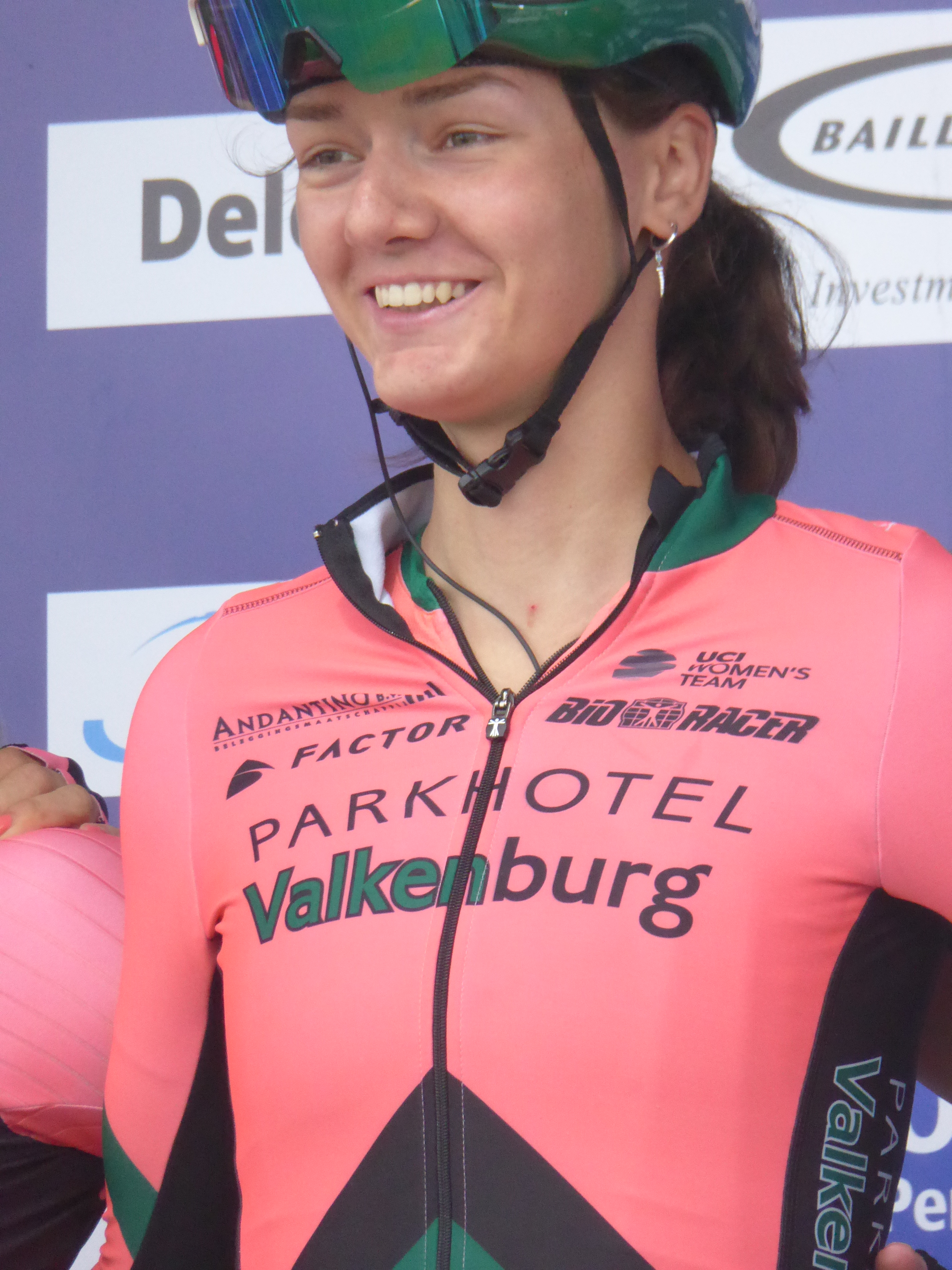
- Swinkels at the 2019 Women's Tour of Scotland

Personal information
- Full name: Sylvie Swinkels
- Born: 31 July 2000 (age 26) Veghel, Netherlands
- Height: 1.74 m (5 ft 9 in)

Cycling career
- Sport: Cycling
- Current team: Roland Le Dévoluy
- Discipline: Road
- Role: Rider

Professional teams
- 2019–2021: Parkhotel Valkenburg
- 2022–2023: Team Coop–Hitec Products
- 2024–: Roland

Sylvie Swinkels (born 31 July 2000) is a Dutch professional racing cyclist, who rides for UCI Women's WorldTeam Roland Le Dévoluy. She is the younger sister of cyclist Karlijn Swinkels.

== Major results ==
2018
9th Overall Watersley Ladies Challenge
2023
10th Clásica de Almería
2024
3rd Grand Prix El Salvador
8th Overall Vuelta a El Salvador
2025
10th Gran Premio della Liberazione
