= Marion Bunel =

French cyclist (born 2004)

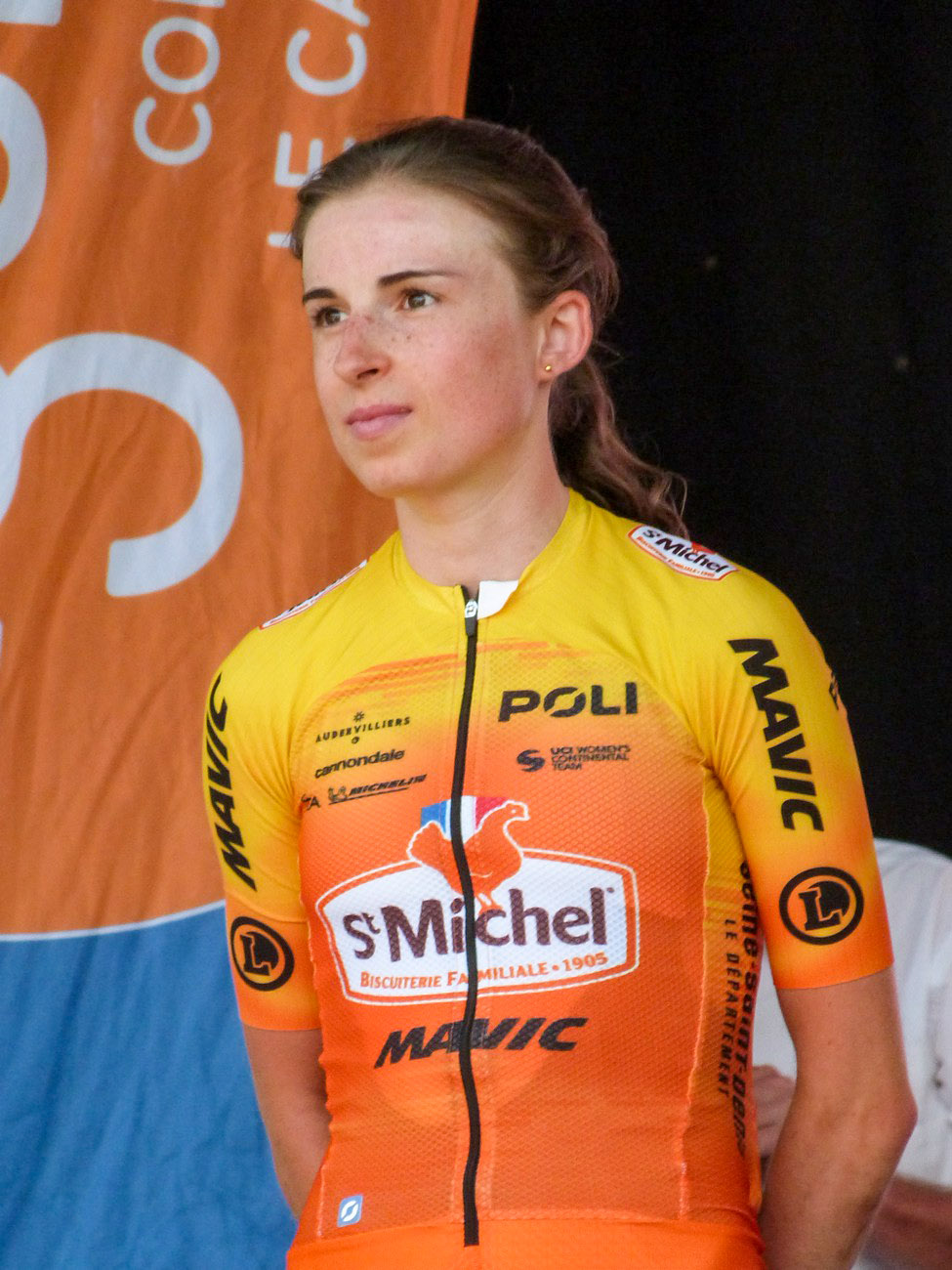
- Bunel in 2024

Personal information
- Born: 7 October 2004 (age 22) Bernay, Eure, France

Cycling career
- Sport: Cycling
- Current team: Visma–Lease a Bike
- Discipline: Road
- Role: Rider

Amateur team
- 2023: VC Islois–Team Stamina

Professional teams
- 2023: St. Michel–Mavic–Auber93 (stagiaire)
- 2024: St. Michel–Mavic–Auber93
- 2025–: Visma–Lease a Bike

Major wins
- Major Tours La Vuelta Femenina Young rider classification (2026)

Marion Bunel (born 7 October 2004) is a French professional racing cyclist, who currently rides for UCI Women's WorldTeam Visma–Lease a Bike. She previously rode for UCI Women's Continental Team St. Michel–Preference Home–Auber93.

== Major results ==
2022
3rd Grand Prix CERATIZIT
2023
7th La Périgord Ladies
8th Overall Tour de l'Avenir Femmes
2024
1st Overall Tour de l'Avenir Femmes

1st Young rider classification
1st Stages 1 & 3

1st Alpes Grésivaudan Classic
5th Overall UAE Tour
9th La Classique Morbihan
8th Région Pays de la Loire Tour-Féminin
9th Overall Tour de Normandie Féminin
2025
5th Road race, UCI Road World Under-23 Championships
2026
3rd Overall La Vuelta

1st Young rider classification
