= Lucía Ruiz Pérez =

Spanish road cyclist (born 2004)

Lucía Ruiz
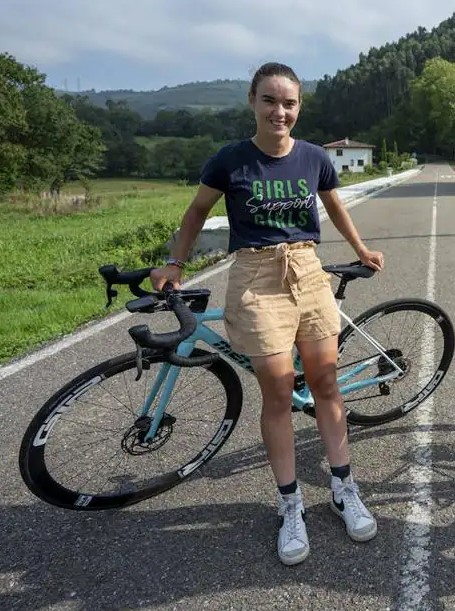

Personal information
- Full name: Lucía Ruiz Pérez
- Born: June 18, 2004 (age 22) Colindres, Cantabria, Spain

Cycling career
- Sport: Cycling
- Current team: Movistar Team
- Discipline: Road
- Role: Rider

Professional teams
- 2023: Eneicat–CMTeam–Seguros Deportivos
- 2024–: Movistar Team

Major wins
- Copa de España Féminas Cofidis (2023)

Lucía Ruiz Pérez (born 18 June 2004) is a Spanish road cyclist who has competed for the UCI Women's Team Movistar Team since 2024. She won the overall classification of the Copa de España Féminas Cofidis in 2023 and is the twin sister of fellow Movistar rider Laura Ruiz Pérez.

== Early life and junior career ==
Ruiz and her twin sister Laura were born in Colindres, Cantabria. Both took up cycling at the age of five and combine their sporting careers with veterinary studies at the University of León. As a junior, Ruiz competed for the Cantabrian team Río Miera–Meruelo, with which she took the first stage of the UCI Junior Nations Cup Bizkaikoloreak in Abadiño in 2021 and 2022.

In May 2022, Ruiz won the second stage of the Tour du Gévaudan Occitanie, another round of the Junior Nations Cup, in a bunch sprint in Mende. She was selected for the Spanish team at the 2022 UCI Junior Road World Championships in Wollongong, Australia, where she finished 35th, the first Spanish rider across the line.

== Professional career ==
=== Eneicat–CMTeam (2023) ===
Ruiz turned professional in 2023 with the UCI Women's Continental Team Eneicat–CMTeam–Seguros Deportivos. On 5 March, in her first race as a professional, she won the GP Cantabria Deporte – VII Trofeo Ciclismo Femenino Villa de Noja, the opening round of the Copa de España Féminas Cofidis, also taking the Cantabrian under-23 regional title. Two weeks later, she repeated the win at the III Gran Premio Igartza in Beasain, the second round of the national series. She made her UCI Women's World Tour debut at the 2023 La Vuelta Femenina and on 18 June, her 19th birthday, was crowned overall winner of the Copa de España Féminas Cofidis combining the elite and under-23 categories.

=== Movistar Team (2024–present) ===
In August 2023, Movistar Team announced the signing of both Ruiz sisters on three-year contracts running through to the end of 2026. In September 2024, riding for the Spanish national team, Ruiz finished sixth in the women's under-23 road race at the European Road Championships in Limburg, the best Spanish result in the event, with her sister taking eighth. The following year she won the silver medal in the under-23 road race at the Spanish National Championships in Granada.

In April 2026, Movistar Team named Ruiz in their seven-rider squad for the La Vuelta Femenina, in support of leader Liane Lippert.
