= Alto de l'Angliru =

Mountain road in Asturias, Spain

Coordinates: 43.221477°N 5.942410°W

Alto de L'Angliru
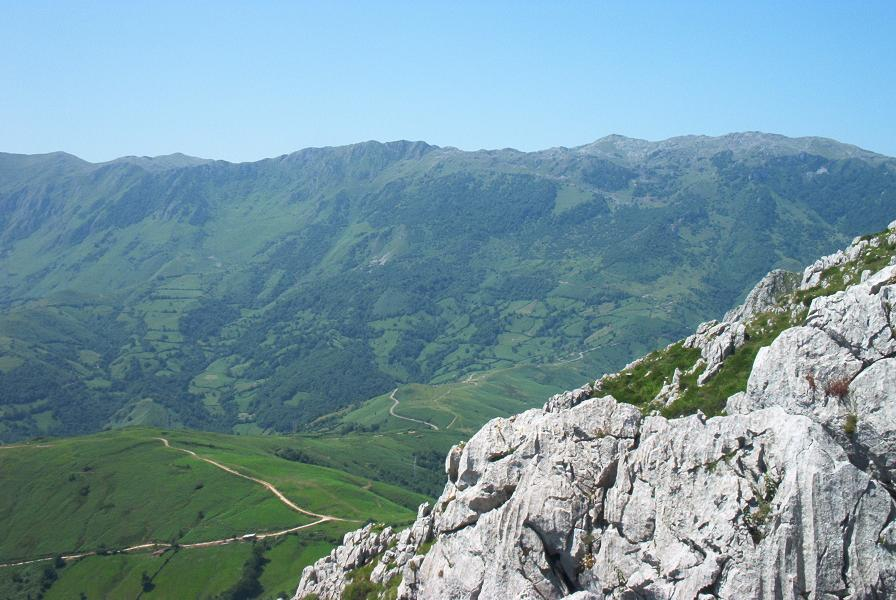
- The Angliru seen from the Monsacro peak.
- Location: Asturias
- Gain in altitude: 1,266 m (4,154 ft)
- Length of climb: 12.5 km (7.8 mi)
- Maximum elevation: 1,573 m (5,161 ft)
- Average gradient: 10.1 %
- Maximum gradient: 24 %

Alto de L'Angliru (Asturian: L'Angliru; Spanish: el Angliru) is a steep mountain road in Asturias, near La Vega-Riosa, in northern Spain. It is considered one of the most demanding climbs in professional road bicycle racing and is often used in the Vuelta a España stage race.

== Origins ==
The organizers of the Vuelta a España wanted a mountain to rival the Alpe d'Huez and Mont Ventoux in the Tour de France and the Mortirolo Pass in the Giro d'Italia, which would go on in 2003 to add one of the world's most demanding climbs, the Zoncolan, in an attempt to compete with the new Spanish climb. The Angliru was first included in 1999, on stage eight from León. José María Jiménez won after catching Pavel Tonkov a kilometer from the finish.

== Details ==
The top of the climb is 1,573 metres (5,161 ft) above sea level. The height difference is 1,266 m (4,154 ft). The climb is 12.5 kilometres (7.8 mi) long, an average of 10.13%. It is near 24% at its steepest. The first 5 km (3.1 mi) are an average of 7.6%— stiff but not over-demanding for world-class cyclists. The sixth kilometre lessens to 2.1% and has a short descent. The last half of the climb is more severe. From six kilometres to the summit, it averages 13.1%. The steepest part, the Cueña les Cabres at 23.6%, is 3 km (1.9 mi) from the summit. There are two later ramps at 18% to 21% (sources vary).

== Controversy ==
During stage 15 in 2002, riders climbed the Angliru in rain. Team cars stalled on the steepest part, some unable to restart because their tires slipped on messages painted by fans. Riders were caught behind them and others had to ride with flat tires because mechanics could not reach them. David Millar crashed three times and protested by handing in his race number a metre from the line. The judges ruled he had not finished the stage and he left the race. He regretted his temper – he had been ninth – and apologised to his team.

== Opinions ==
The manager of the Kelme team, Vicente Belda, said: "What do they want? Blood? They ask us to stay clean and avoid doping and then they make the riders tackle this kind of barbarity." Patrice Halgand, a French rider, said the Union Cycliste Internationale had rules about the distance and frequency of races but not about hills. He said:

I find it ridiculous to go looking for a hill on a narrow road, dangerous and winding, because it's not like that, that you change the way a race develops [Ce n'est pas cela qui va changer les données de la course]. There are other cols than the Angliru to climb in the Vuelta. Differences in the riders would show just as well on a pass that's less steep and on a wider road. It would also be better for spectacle, because on the Angliru the guys go too pitifully for the climb to have any sporting interest. Even the winner goes up in slow motion. There's no attacking. From front to rear, everyone just gets up as best he can.

The former climber Charly Mottet approved the climb. He said:

I saw the climb of the Angliru and I thought it was good for cycling. I watched on television and saw a superb race. I am for these difficulties out of the normal, these extreme gradients. The steepness doesn't shock me because there is always a solution in choosing the right gears. The organiser should give an idea of what's needed in the race bible. I would see it, as a former rider (and organiser of the Dauphiné Libéré) as my duty.

== Stage winners and fastest ascent times ==
Male Winners of Angliru stage
Year	Rider
1999	José María Jiménez (ESP)
2000	Gilberto Simoni (ITA)
2002	Roberto Heras (ESP)
2008	Alberto Contador (ESP)
2011	Wout Poels (NED)
2013	Kenny Elissonde (FRA)
2017	Alberto Contador (ESP)
2020	Hugh Carthy (GBR)
2023	Primož Roglič (SLO)
2025	João Almeida (POR)

Female Winners of Angliru stage
Year	Rider
2026	Petra Stiasny (SUI)

Fastest Ascents of the Angliru
Rank	Year	Ascent Time	Speed	Rider
1	2000	41:55	18.32 km/h	Roberto Heras (ESP)
2	2023	42:27	18.09 km/h	Primož Roglič (SLO)
3	2023	42:27	18.09 km/h	Jonas Vingegaard (DEN)
4	2023	42:46	17.96 km/h	Sepp Kuss (USA)
5	2023	42:46	17.96 km/h	Mikel Landa (ESP)
6	2013	43:07	17.81 km/h	Chris Horner (USA)
7	2023	43:11	17.78 km/h	Wout Poels (NED)
8	2008	43:12	17.78 km/h	Alberto Contador (ESP)
9	2000	43:24	17.70 km/h	Pavel Tonkov (RUS)
10	2000	43:24	17.70 km/h	Roberto Laiseka (ESP)
11	2023	43:25	17.69 km/h	João Almeida (POR)
12	2013	43:34	17.63 km/h	Alejandro Valverde (ESP)
13	2013	43:34	17.63 km/h	Vincenzo Nibali (ITA)
14	2020	43:34	17.63 km/h	Hugh Carthy (GBR)
15	2023	43:47	17.54 km/h	Cian Uijtdebroeks (BEL)
16	2023	43:47	17.54 km/h	Santiago Buitrago (COL)
17	2020	43:50	17.52 km/h	Aleksandr Vlasov (RUS)
18	2020	43:50	17.52 km/h	Enric Mas (ESP)
19	2020	43:50	17.52 km/h	Richard Carapaz (ECU)
20	2008	43:54	17.49 km/h	Alejandro Valverde (ESP)
21	2002	43:55	17.49 km/h	Roberto Heras (ESP)
22	2011	43:57	17.47 km/h	Juan José Cobo (ESP)†
23	2020	44:00	17.45 km/h	Primož Roglič (SLO)
24	2020	44:00	17.45 km/h	Sepp Kuss (USA)
25	2020	44:00	17.45 km/h	Dan Martin (IRL)

† Juan José Cobo is alternately recorded as having a time of 43:53, Roberto Heras is alternately recorded as having a time of 43:57
^ On 18 July 2019, the UCI confirmed the suspension of Cobo after being found guilty of an anti-doping violation on his biological passport between 2009 and 2011, stripping him of his stage win. Wout Poels, who finished second on the stage, was elevated to stage winner as a result.

== See also ==
- List of highest paved roads in Europe
- List of mountain passes
