= Barbara Malcotti =

Italian cyclist

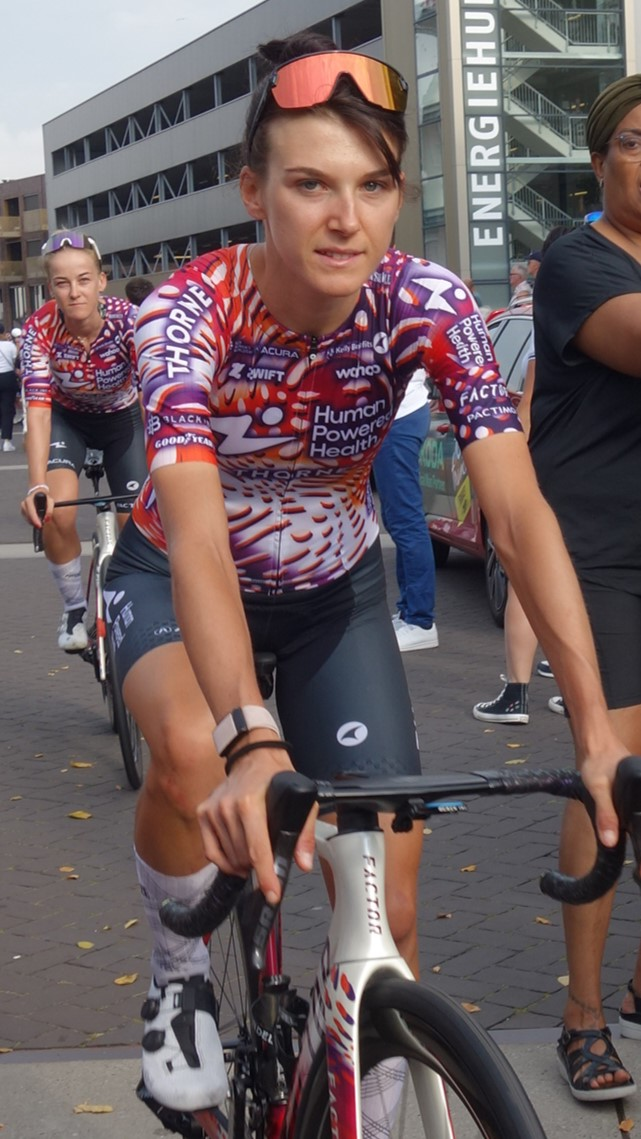
- Malcotti in 2024

Personal information
- Full name: Barbara Malcotti
- Born: 19 February 2000 (age 26) Tione di Trento, Italy
- Weight: 52 kg (115 lb)

Cycling career
- Sport: Cycling
- Current team: Human Powered Health
- Discipline: Road
- Role: Rider

Professional teams
- 2019–2021: Valcar–Cylance
- 2022–: Human Powered Health

Barbara Malcotti (born 19 February 2000) is an Italian professional racing cyclist, who currently rides for UCI Women's WorldTeam Human Powered Health.

== Major results ==
2018
4th Road race, UCI World Junior Road Championships
2019
1st Young rider classification, Setmana Ciclista Valenciana
2021
4th Tre Valli Varesine
8th Giro dell'Emilia Internazionale Donne Elite
2023
3rd Kreiz Breizh Elites Dames
7th Overall Tour Cycliste Féminin International de l'Ardèche

1st Stage 6

10th Overall Vuelta Ciclista Andalucia Ruta Del Sol
2025
6th Overall UAE Tour Women
9th Cadel Evans Great Ocean Road Race
2026
9th Overall La Vuelta Femenina
