= Alice Coutinho =

French cyclist

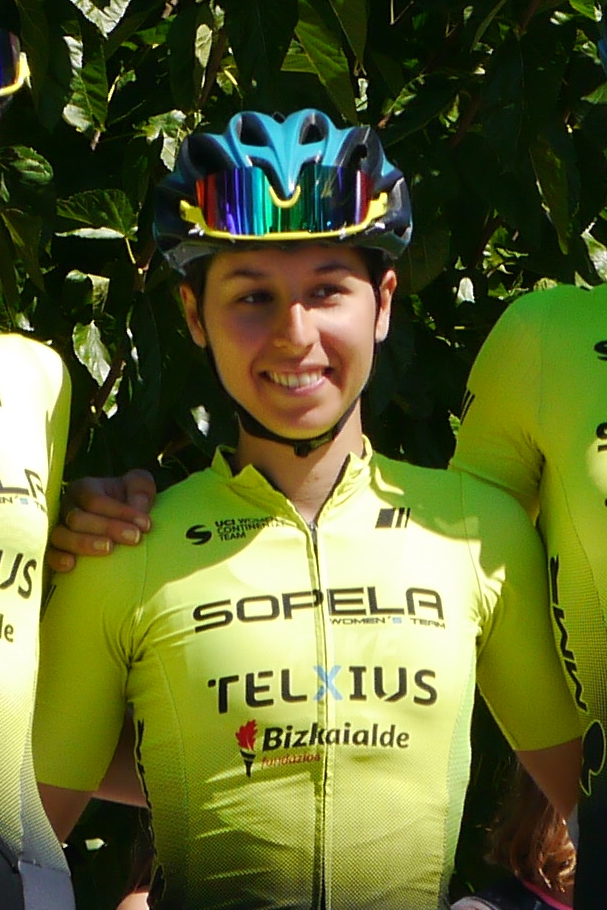
- Alice Coutinho on TCFIA 2022.

Personal information
- Full name: Alice Coutinho
- Born: 13 September 2000 (age 26)

Cycling career
- Sport: Cycling
- Current team: VC Morteau-Montbenoît
- Discipline: Road
- Role: Rider

Amateur teams
- 2018–2019: BioFrais–VC Saint-Julien-en-Genevois
- 2021: VC Morteau-Montbenoît
- 2024: Academia Abadiño
- 2025: Massi Baix Ter Women's Team

Professional teams
- 2020: Charente-Maritime Women Cycling
- 2021-2023: Sopela Women's Team
- 2024: Eneicat-CM Team
- 2026: Winspace Orange Seal

Alice Coutinho (born 13 September 2000) is a French racing cyclist, who currently rides for French amateur team VC Morteau-Montbenoît. In October 2020, she rode in the women's edition of the 2020 Liège–Bastogne–Liège race in Belgium.

Coutinho agreed to join the French-based Winspace Orange Seal team for the 2026 season.
