= Visma–Lease a Bike (women's team) =

Dutch cycling team

Team information
- UCI code: TVL
- Registered: Netherlands
- Founded: 2020
- Discipline: Road
- Status: UCI Women's WorldTeam (from 2022); UCI Women's Continental Team (2021)
- Bicycles: Cervélo
- Components: SRAM
- Website: Team home page

Key personnel
- Team manager: Rutger Tijssen

Team name history
- 2021–2023 2024–: Team Jumbo–Visma; Visma–Lease a Bike

Visma–Lease a Bike is a women's professional road bicycle racing team based in the Netherlands. The team is sponsored by Norwegian software and IT company Visma and German company Lease a Bike, which also sponsor a men's team.

== History ==
In October 2020, Team Jumbo–Visma announced the launch of a women's team, which officials said would "complete" an organization that already had a men's team. They said they aimed to develop women's cycling within and outside the Netherlands using the team's experience and facilities, and ultimately to build the best women's team in the world.

Superstar Marianne Vos joined the team and raced in its inaugural season in 2021; she extended her participation through the end of 2025. In 2024, French mountain bike world champion Pauline Ferrand-Prévot announced that she would return to road cycling, signing a three-year deal with the team.

Major victories for the team have included Vos' in the Amstel Gold Race in 2021 and 2024, and Ferrand-Prévot's in the 2025 Paris–Roubaix Femmes and the 2025 Tour de France Femmes. The team has stage wins in the three major stage races: La Vuelta Femenina, Giro d'Italia Women and Tour de France Femmes.

== Team roster ==
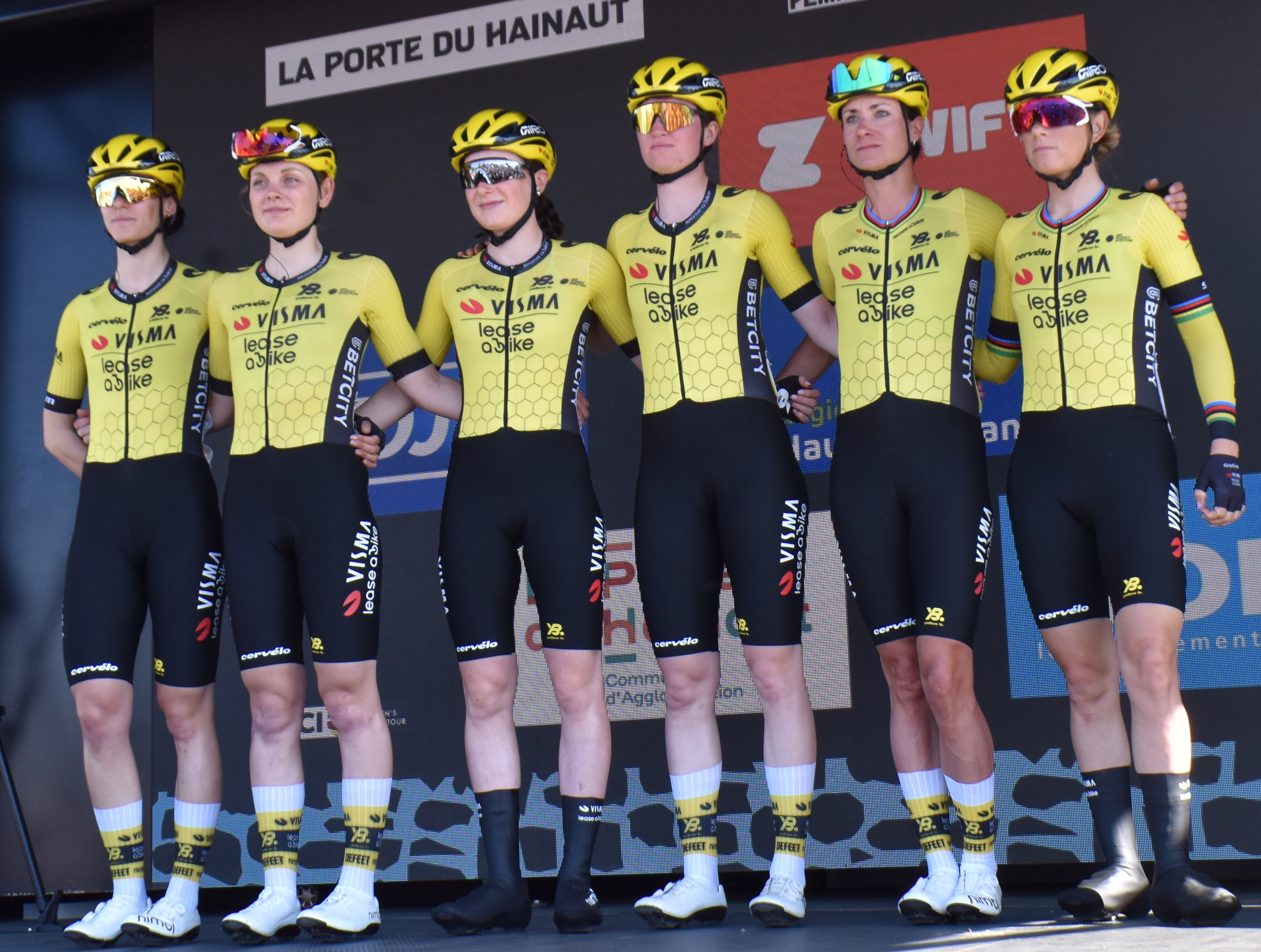
Riders at the 2025 Paris–Roubaix Femmes.

As of 26 January 2025.

| Rider | Date of birth |
|---|---|
| Carlijn Achtereekte (NED) | 29 January 1990 (age 36) |
| Marion Bunel (FRA) | 7 October 2004 (age 21) |
| Viktória Chladoňová (SVK) | 15 November 2006 (age 19) |
| Femke de Vries (NED) | 16 April 1994 (age 32) |
| Pauline Ferrand-Prévot (FRA) | 10 February 1992 (age 34) |
| Martina Fidanza (ITA) | 5 November 1999 (age 26) |
| Mijntje Geurts (NED) | 25 October 2003 (age 22) |
| Lieke Nooijen (NED) | 20 July 2001 (age 25) |
| Maud Oudeman (NED) | 29 September 2003 (age 22) |

| Rider | Date of birth |
|---|---|
| Rosita Reijnhout (NED) | 8 April 2004 (age 22) |
| Linda Riedmann (GER) | 23 March 2003 (age 23) |
| Eva van Agt (NED) | 18 March 1997 (age 29) |
| Fem van Empel (NED) | 3 September 2002 (age 24) |
| Nienke Veenhoven (NED) | 20 March 2004 (age 22) |
| Margaux Vigié (FRA) | 21 July 1995 (age 31) |
| Sophie von Berswordt (NED) | 29 May 1996 (age 30) |
| Marianne Vos (NED) | 13 May 1987 (age 39) |
| Imogen Wolff (GBR) | 26 March 2006 (age 20) |

== Major wins ==
2021
Gent–Wevelgem, Marianne Vos
Amstel Gold Race, Marianne Vos
Stages 3 & 7 Giro Rosa, Marianne Vos
Overall Kreiz Breizh Elites Dames, Anna Henderson

Stages 1 & 2, Anna Henderson

Stage 2 Ladies Tour of Norway, Riejanne Markus
Prologue, Stages 4 & 5 Simac Ladies Tour, Marianne Vos
United Kingdom National Time Trial Championships, Anna Henderson
2022
UCI Cyclo-cross World Championships, Marianne Vos
Prologue Grand Prix Elsy Jacobs, Anna Henderson
Switzerland National Under-23 Time trial Championships, Noemi Rüegg
Netherlands National Road race Championships, Riejanne Markus
Switzerland National Under-23 Road race Championships, Noemi Rüegg
Stages 2 & 5 Giro Donne, Marianne Vos
Stages 2 & 6 Tour de France, Marianne Vos
Stages 1, 2, 3 & 6 Tour of Scandinavia, Marianne Vos
Stage 4 Simac Ladies Tour, Riejanne Markus
2023
UCI Cyclo-cross World Championships, Fem Van Empel
Stage 1 (TTT) La Vuelta Femenina (Note: The riders on the squad were Anna Henderson, Amber Kraak, Riejanne Markus, Marianne Vos, Noemi Rüegg, Eva van Agt and Coryn Labecki)
Stages 3 & 4 La Vuelta Femenina, Marianne Vos
Navarra Women's Elite Classic, Riejanne Markus
Netherlands National Time trial Championships, Riejanne Markus
La Périgord Ladies, Amber Kraak
Overall Tour de la Semois, Karlijn Swinkels

Stages 1 & 2, Karlijn Swinkels

Switzerland National Under-23 Time trial Championships, Noemi Rüegg
2024
UCI Cyclo-cross World Championships, Fem Van Empel
Cadel Evans Great Ocean Road Race, Rosita Reijnhout
Omloop Het Nieuwsblad, Marianne Vos
Dwars door Vlaanderen, Marianne Vos
Amstel Gold Race, Marianne Vos
Points classification La Vuelta Femenina, Marianne Vos

Stages 3 & 7, Marianne Vos

Veenendaal Classic, Riejanne Markus
Overall Volta Ciclista a Catalunya Femenina, Marianne Vos

Points classification, Marianne Vos
Stage 2, Marianne Vos

Great Britain Time trial championships, Anna Henderson
Netherlands Time Trial Championships, Riejanne Markus
Overall Princess Anna Vasa Tour, Lieke Nooijen

Points classification, Lieke Nooijen
Stage 1 Team time trial
Stages 3 & 4, Lieke Nooijen

Egmont Cycling Race, Lieke Nooijen
Points classification Tour de France, Marianne Vos
UCI Gravel World Championships, Marianne Vos

== National, continental and world champions ==
2021
British Time Trial, Anna Henderson
2022
World Cyclo-cross, Marianne Vos
Swiss U23 Time Trial, Noemi Rüegg
Netherlands Road Race, Riejanne Markus
Swiss U23 Road Race, Noemi Rüegg
2023
Netherlands Time Trial, Riejanne Markus
Swiss U23 Time Trial, Noemi Rüegg
2024
World Cyclo-cross, Fem van Empel
British Time Trial, Anna Henderson
Netherlands Time Trial, Riejanne Markus
World Gravel, Marianne Vos
2025
Slovak Road race, Viktória Chladoňová
Slovak Time trial, Viktória Chladoňová
