= La Vuelta Femenina =

Annual bicycle race held in Spain

Race details
- Date: May
- Region: Spain
- Discipline: Road
- Competition: UCI Women's World Tour
- Type: one day race 2015–2017 stage race 2018–
- Organiser: Unipublic; Amaury Sport Organisation
- Race director: Fernando Escartín
- Web site: www.lavueltafemenina.es/en

History
- First edition: 2015
- Editions: 12 (as of 2026)
- First winner: Shelley Olds (USA)
- Most wins: Annemiek van Vleuten (NED) (3 wins)
- Most recent: Paula Blasi (SPA)

La Vuelta Femenina (Spanish: [la ˈβwelta femeˈnina]; "The Female Tour") is an elite women's professional bicycle race held in Spain. The race is organised by Unipublic and Amaury Sport Organisation (ASO), which also organises the men's Vuelta a España. It is part of the UCI Women's World Tour.

First held in September 2015 as the Challenge by La Vuelta one day race alongside the men's race, it became a stage race in 2018 and gradually increased in length. La Vuelta Femenina was first held as a standalone event separated from the men's race in 2023. Some teams and media have referred to the race as a "Grand Tour", as it is one of the biggest and longest events on the women's calendar. However, the race does not meet the UCI definition of such an event. Generally held over seven or eight days in May, the course features ascents of mountain passes as well as individual or team time trials.

The rider with the lowest aggregate time is the leader of the general classification and wears the red jersey. While the general classification gathers the most attention, there are other contests held within the race: the points classification for the sprinters, the mountains classification for the climbers and young rider classification for the riders under the age of 23. Achieving a stage win also provides prestige, often accomplished by a team's sprint specialist or a rider taking part in a breakaway.

== History ==
=== Challenge by La Vuelta ===
In 2015, La Madrid Challenge by La Vuelta was first held as a one-day road race in the centre of Madrid, coinciding with the final day of the Vuelta a España. The race was similar to the La Course by Le Tour de France race held in conjunction with the final days of the Tour de France. In 2016, the race joined the newly established UCI Women's World Tour. From 2018 onwards, a time trial was held as a first stage, remaining in the Madrid region.

In 2020, a third day of racing was added and the race was renamed as the Ceratizit Challenge by La Vuelta – after sponsor Ceratizit, and as stages were held outside the borders of the Autonomous Community of Madrid. The 2021 edition increased the number of stages to 4, with the race finishing in Santiago de Compostela.

The 2022 edition had 5 stages, from Marina de Cudeyo in the northern Cantabria region to Madrid – with the final day of the race coinciding with the final day of the 2022 Vuelta a España.

The race had been criticised by the women's peloton for not being challenging enough, with 3 time Giro Donne winner and 2022 Tour de France Femmes winner Annemiek van Vleuten, stating "if you look at the [2022] course you can conclude that the Vuelta (sic) is not yet ready to call itself a grand tour".

=== La Vuelta Femenina ===
In June 2022, it was announced that the Challenge by La Vuelta event would increase in length to 7 days, be renamed La Vuelta Femenina, and would be held in May rather than September. This would make it the third Major Tour for professional women following the Giro d'Italia Donne and the Tour de France Femmes.

In February 2023, the route for the 2023 edition was announced by race director Fernando Escartín, who also confirmed that the race will be sponsored by supermarket Carrefour. Annemiek van Vleuten praised the route, calling it "a very complete Vuelta". Organisers referred to the 2023 edition as the first edition of La Vuelta Femenina, with media noting that the race had grown from the previous Challenge by La Vuelta races. In April 2023, the European Broadcasting Union announced that a three year television deal had been agreed, with the race available on free to air channels across Europe.

The race has identical classifications to the Vuelta a España, with the red jersey for the general classification, the green jersey for the points classification, the polka dot jersey for the mountains classification, and the white jersey for the young rider (under 23) classification. The jerseys are made by Santini. The first rider to the top of the largest climb on the race is awarded the Cima Estela Domínguez, honouring the Spanish rider who was killed while training in 2023.

The 2023 edition was won by Dutch rider Annemiek van Vleuten by just nine seconds, making her the first woman to win all three of the major stage races in women's cycling (La Vuelta Femenina, Tour de France Femmes and Giro d'Italia Women). The 2024 edition was won by Dutch rider Demi Vollering, on a longer and more challenging course than previous editions. In 2026, the race featured the "legendary" Angliru climb (12.5 kilometres (7.8 mi) in length, an average gradient of 10%) for the first time.

From 2026, the UCI awarded more ranking points to Giro d'Italia Women, Tour de France Femmes and the Vuelta Femenina compared to other races in the UCI Women's World Tour – elevating the three races in status.

== Winners ==
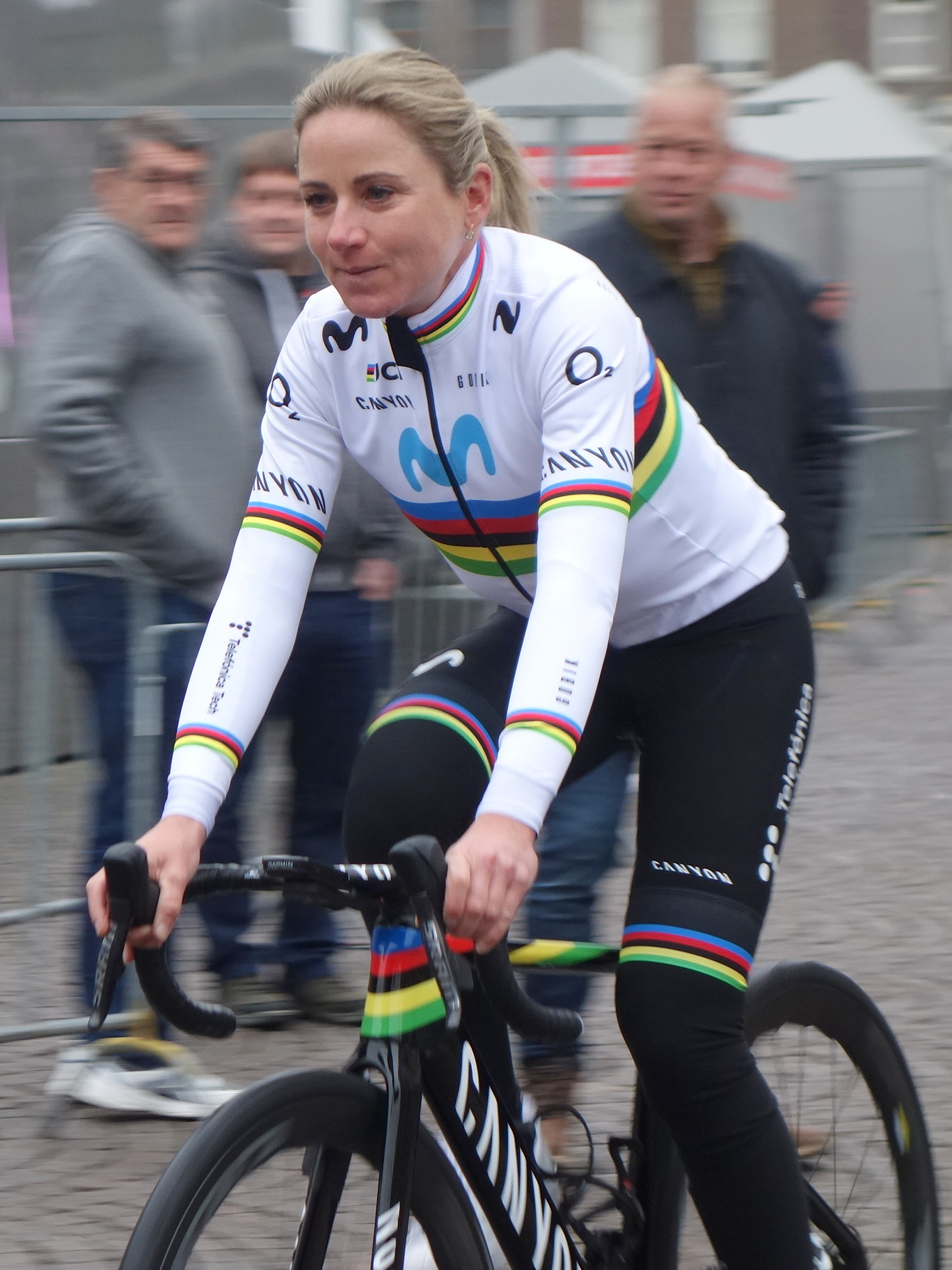
Annemiek van Vleuten has won the most editions of the race – winning Challenge by La Vuelta in 2021 and 2022, and the first edition of La Vuelta Femenina in 2023.

=== Madrid Challenge by La Vuelta ===
Year	Country	Rider	Team
2015	United States	Shelley Olds	Bigla Pro Cycling Team
2016	Belgium	Jolien D'Hoore	Wiggle High5
2017	Belgium	Jolien D'Hoore	Wiggle High5
2018	Netherlands	Ellen van Dijk	Team Sunweb
2019	Germany	Lisa Brennauer	WNT–Rotor Pro Cycling

=== Challenge by La Vuelta ===
Year	Country	Rider	Team
2020	Germany	Lisa Brennauer	Ceratizit–WNT Pro Cycling
2021	Netherlands	Annemiek van Vleuten	Movistar Team
2022	Netherlands	Annemiek van Vleuten	Movistar Team

=== La Vuelta Femenina ===
Year	Country	Rider	Team
2023	Netherlands	Annemiek van Vleuten	Movistar Team
2024	Netherlands	Demi Vollering	Team SD Worx–Protime
2025	Netherlands	Demi Vollering	FDJ–Suez
2026	Spain	Paula Blasi	UAE Team ADQ

=== Wins per country ===
Wins	Country
6	Netherlands
2	Belgium; Germany
1	Spain; United States

== Winners of secondary classifications ==
Year	Points Classification	Mountains Classification	Team Classification
2023	Marianne Vos (NED)	Gaia Realini (ITA)	UAE Team ADQ
2024	Marianne Vos (NED)	Demi Vollering (NED)	Team SD Worx–Protime
2025	Marianne Vos (NED)	Demi Vollering (NED)	FDJ–Suez
2026	Lotte Kopecky (BEL)	Paula Blasi (SPA)	Team SD Worx–Protime

== See also ==
- Giro d'Italia Women – a stage race in Italy
- Tour de France Femmes – a stage race in France
