= List of teams and cyclists in the 2025 Tour de France Femmes =

List of cyclists

The following is a list of teams and riders that participated in the 2025 Tour de France Femmes.

== Teams ==
Twenty-two teams took part in the race. The teams were announced on 2 April 2025. All 15 UCI Women's WorldTeams were automatically invited. They were joined by seven UCI Women's ProTeams – the two best 2024 UCI Women's Continental Teams (EF Education–Oatly and VolkerWessels Women Cyclingteam) received an automatic invitation, and the other five teams were selected by ASO, the organisers of the Tour. A total of 154 riders from 30 nationalities started the race, with the Netherlands having the largest contingent (34 riders).

UCI Women's WorldTeams

- AG Insurance–Soudal
- Canyon//SRAM Zondacrypto
- Ceratizit Pro Cycling
- FDJ–Suez
- Fenix–Deceuninck
- Human Powered Health
- Lidl–Trek
- Liv AlUla Jayco
- Movistar Team
- Roland Le Dévoluy
- Team Picnic–PostNL
- Team SD Worx–Protime
- UAE Team ADQ
- Uno-X Mobility
- Visma–Lease a Bike

UCI Women's ProTeams

- Arkéa–B&B Hotels Women
- Cofidis
- EF Education–Oatly
- Laboral Kutxa–Fundación Euskadi
- St. Michel–Preference Home–Auber93
- VolkerWessels Cycling Team
- Winspace Orange Seal

== Cyclists ==
Legend
No.	Starting number worn by the rider during the Tour
Pos.	Position in the general classification
Time	Deficit to the winner of the general classification
‡	Denotes riders born on or after 1 January 2003 eligible for the young rider classification
General classification	Denotes the winner of the general classification
Points classification	Denotes the winner of the points classification
Mountains classification	Denotes the winner of the mountains classification
Young rider classification	Denotes the winner of the young rider classification (eligibility indicated by ‡)
Team classification	Denotes riders that represent the winner of the team classification
Super-combativity award	Denotes the winner of the super-combativity award
DNS	Denotes a rider who did not start a stage, followed by the stage before which she withdrew
DNF	Denotes a rider who did not finish a stage, followed by the stage in which she withdrew
DSQ	Denotes a rider who was disqualified from the race, followed by the stage in which this occurred
OTL	Denotes a rider finished outside the time limit, followed by the stage in which they did so
Ages correct as of Saturday 26 July 2025, the date on which the Tour begins

=== By starting number ===
No.	Name	Nationality	Team	Age	Pos.	Time	Ref.
1	Katarzyna Niewiadoma	Poland	Canyon//SRAM Zondacrypto	30	3	+ 4' 09"	
2	Ricarda Bauernfeind	Germany	Canyon//SRAM Zondacrypto	25	32	+ 55' 54"	
3	Neve Bradbury	Australia	Canyon//SRAM Zondacrypto	23	71	+ 1h 48' 32"	
4	Chloé Dygert	United States	Canyon//SRAM Zondacrypto	28	DNS-9	–	
5	Cecilie Uttrup Ludwig	Denmark	Canyon//SRAM Zondacrypto	29	21	+ 42' 25"	
6	Soraya Paladin	Italy	Canyon//SRAM Zondacrypto	32	DNF-7	–	
7	Agnieszka Skalniak-Sójka	Poland	Canyon//SRAM Zondacrypto	28	DNS-5	–	
11	Demi Vollering	Netherlands	FDJ–Suez	28	2	+ 3' 42"	
12	Elise Chabbey	Switzerland	FDJ–Suez	32	28	+ 52' 26"	
13	Amber Kraak	Netherlands	FDJ–Suez	30	51	+ 1h 29' 21"	
14	Juliette Labous	France	FDJ–Suez	26	7	+ 9' 13"	
15	Marie Le Net	France	FDJ–Suez	25	58	+ 1h 37' 03"	
16	Évita Muzic	France	FDJ–Suez	26	10	+ 15' 50"	
17	Ally Wollaston	New Zealand	FDJ–Suez	24	92	+ 2h 12' 57"	
21	Pauliena Rooijakkers	Netherlands	Fenix–Deceuninck	32	9	+ 13' 59"	
22	Millie Couzens ‡	Great Britain	Fenix–Deceuninck	21	87	+ 2h 09' 24"	
23	Yara Kastelijn	Netherlands	Fenix–Deceuninck	27	17	+ 35' 37"	
24	Flora Perkins ‡	Great Britain	Fenix–Deceuninck	21	121	+ 2h 42' 16"	
25	Puck Pieterse	Netherlands	Fenix–Deceuninck	23	24	+ 49' 17"	
26	Christina Schweinberger	Austria	Fenix–Deceuninck	28	64	+ 1h 45' 32"	
27	Marthe Truyen	Belgium	Fenix–Deceuninck	25	108	+ 2h 20' 50"	
31	Cédrine Kerbaol	France	EF Education–Oatly	24	8	+ 13' 43"	
32	Letizia Borghesi	Italy	EF Education–Oatly	26	95	+ 2h 15' 26"	
33	Henrietta Christie	New Zealand	EF Education–Oatly	23	80	+ 2h 03' 38"	
34	Kristen Faulkner	United States	EF Education–Oatly	32	DNF-5	–	
35	Alison Jackson	Canada	EF Education–Oatly	36	113	+ 2h 25' 25"	
36	Noemi Rüegg	Switzerland	EF Education–Oatly	24	60	+ 1h 39' 03"	
37	Magdeleine Vallieres	Canada	EF Education–Oatly	23	18	+ 37' 10"	
41	Lotte Kopecky	Belgium	Team SD Worx–Protime	29	45	+ 1h 16' 41"	
42	Mischa Bredewold	Netherlands	Team SD Worx–Protime	25	83	+ 2h 06' 48"	
43	Elena Cecchini	Italy	Team SD Worx–Protime	33	107	+ 2h 20' 12"	
44	Femke Gerritse	Netherlands	Team SD Worx–Protime	24	100	+ 2h 16' 19"	
45	Anna van der Breggen	Netherlands	Team SD Worx–Protime	35	11	+ 9' 03"	
46	Blanka Vas	Hungary	Team SD Worx–Protime	23	76	+ 1h 59' 56"	
47	Lorena Wiebes	Netherlands	Team SD Worx–Protime	26	57	+ 1h 33' 43"	
51	Pauline Ferrand-Prévot	France	Visma–Lease a Bike	33	1	29h 54' 24"	
52	Marion Bunel ‡	France	Visma–Lease a Bike	20	39	+ 1h 06' 28"	
53	Femke de Vries	Netherlands	Visma–Lease a Bike	31	20	+ 38' 12"	
54	Lieke Nooijen	Netherlands	Visma–Lease a Bike	24	34	+ 1h 02' 07"	
55	Eva van Agt	Netherlands	Visma–Lease a Bike	28	65	+ 1h 46' 00"	
56	Marianne Vos	Netherlands	Visma–Lease a Bike	38	37	+ 1h 03' 42"	
57	Imogen Wolff ‡	Great Britain	Visma–Lease a Bike	19	89	+ 2h 11' 27"	
61	Elisa Longo Borghini	Italy	UAE Team ADQ	33	DNS-3	–	
62	Brodie Chapman	Australia	UAE Team ADQ	34	DNS-9	–	
63	Eleonora Camilla Gasparrini	Italy	UAE Team ADQ	23	DNS-4	–	
64	Lara Gillespie	Ireland	UAE Team ADQ	24	82	+ 2h 06' 48"	
65	Maeva Squiban	France	UAE Team ADQ	23	15	+ 32' 18"	
66	Karlijn Swinkels	Netherlands	UAE Team ADQ	26	DNF-5	–	
67	Dominika Włodarczyk	Poland	UAE Team ADQ	24	4	+ 5' 45"	
71	Marlen Reusser	Switzerland	Movistar Team	33	DNF-1	–	
72	Aude Biannic	France	Movistar Team	34	77	+ 2h 00' 11"	
73	Jelena Erić	Serbia	Movistar Team	29	112	+ 2h 25' 19"	
74	Liane Lippert	Germany	Movistar Team	27	59	+ 1h 37' 11"	
75	Ana Vitória Magalhães	Brazil	Movistar Team	24	74	+ 1h 54' 13"	
76	Sara Martín	Spain	Movistar Team	26	120	+ 2h 36' 54"	
77	Mareille Meijering	Netherlands	Movistar Team	30	42	+ 1h 09' 57"	
81	Elisa Balsamo	Italy	Lidl–Trek	27	DNF-5	–	
82	Lucinda Brand	Netherlands	Lidl–Trek	36	47	+ 1h 25' 17"	
83	Niamh Fisher-Black	New Zealand	Lidl–Trek	24	5	+ 6' 25"	
84	Riejanne Markus	Netherlands	Lidl–Trek	30	22	+ 46' 45"	
85	Emma Norsgaard	Denmark	Lidl–Trek	26	98	+ 2h 15' 57"	
86	Lauretta Hanson	Australia	Lidl–Trek	30	75	+ 1h 54' 37"	
87	Shirin van Anrooij	Netherlands	Lidl–Trek	23	36	+ 1h 03' 24"	
91	Kimberley Le Court	Mauritius	AG Insurance–Soudal	29	16	+ 32' 45"	
92	Shari Bossuyt	Belgium	AG Insurance–Soudal	24	81	+ 2h 06' 31"	
93	Justine Ghekiere	Belgium	AG Insurance–Soudal	29	14	+ 28' 40"	
94	Sarah Gigante	Australia	AG Insurance–Soudal	24	6	+ 6' 40"	
95	Ilse Pluimers	Netherlands	AG Insurance–Soudal	23	111	+ 2h 25' 00"	
96	Julie Van de Velde	Belgium	AG Insurance–Soudal	32	62	+ 1h 44' 09"	
97	Gladys Verhulst-Wild	France	AG Insurance–Soudal	28	DNF-9	–	
101	Charlotte Kool	Netherlands	Team Picnic–PostNL	26	DNS-2	–	
102	Francesca Barale ‡	Italy	Team Picnic–PostNL	22	48	+ 1h 27' 20"	
103	Rachele Barbieri	Italy	Team Picnic–PostNL	28	104	+ 2h 17' 54"	
104	Pfeiffer Georgi	Great Britain	Team Picnic–PostNL	24	52	+ 1h 29' 59"	
105	Megan Jastrab	United States	Team Picnic–PostNL	23	54	+ 1h 31' 35"	
106	Franziska Koch	Germany	Team Picnic–PostNL	25	38	+ 1h 03' 46"	
107	Nienke Vinke ‡	Netherlands	Team Picnic–PostNL	21	19	+ 37' 17"	
111	Valentina Cavallar	Austria	Arkéa–B&B Hotels Women	24	DNS-6	–	
112	Lotte Claes	Belgium	Arkéa–B&B Hotels Women	32	31	+ 55' 38"	
113	Emilia Fahlin	Sweden	Arkéa–B&B Hotels Women	36	124	+ 2h 54' 37"	
114	Clémence Latimier ‡	France	Arkéa–B&B Hotels Women	21	61	+ 1h 43' 38"	
115	Titia Ryo ‡	France	Arkéa–B&B Hotels Women	20	26	+ 52' 08"	
116	Maurène Trégouët ‡	France	Arkéa–B&B Hotels Women	21	122	+ 2h 44' 00"	
117	Marjolein van 't Geloof	Netherlands	Arkéa–B&B Hotels Women	29	DNF-5	–	
121	Letizia Paternoster	Italy	Liv AlUla Jayco	26	84	+ 2h 07' 46"	
122	Mavi García	Spain	Liv AlUla Jayco	41	27	+ 52' 10"	
123	Jeanne Korevaar	Netherlands	Liv AlUla Jayco	28	109	+ 2h 21' 25"	
124	Ruby Roseman-Gannon	Australia	Liv AlUla Jayco	26	78	+ 2h 02' 12"	
125	Silke Smulders	Netherlands	Liv AlUla Jayco	24	43	+ 1h 10' 37"	
126	Monica Trinca Colonel	Italy	Liv AlUla Jayco	26	DNF-5	–	
127	Ella Wyllie	New Zealand	Liv AlUla Jayco	22	12	+ 24' 54"	
131	Katrine Aalerud	Norway	Uno-X Mobility	30	DNF-5	–	
132	Susanne Andersen	Norway	Uno-X Mobility	27	OTL-8	–	
133	Teuntje Beekhuis	Netherlands	Uno-X Mobility	29	110	+ 2h 22' 22"	
134	Maria Giulia Confalonieri	Italy	Uno-X Mobility	32	DNF-5	–	
135	Rebecca Koerner	Denmark	Uno-X Mobility	24	DNS-4	–	
136	Mie Bjørndal Ottestad	Norway	Uno-X Mobility	28	DNS-6	–	
137	Linda Zanetti	Switzerland	Uno-X Mobility	23	79	+ 2h 03' 29"	
141	Victoire Berteau	France	Cofidis	24	69	+ 1h 47' 43"	
142	Julie Bego ‡	France	Cofidis	20	33	+ 56' 33"	
143	Eugenia Bujak	Slovenia	Cofidis	36	DNF-5	–	
144	Amalie Dideriksen	Denmark	Cofidis	29	73	+ 1h 51' 38"	
145	Clara Koppenburg	Germany	Cofidis	29	88	+ 2h 09' 29"	
146	Hannah Ludwig	Germany	Cofidis	25	90	+ 2h 11' 47"	
147	Nadia Quagliotto	Italy	Cofidis	28	93	+ 2h 13' 03"	
151	Sarah Van Dam	Canada	Ceratizit Pro Cycling	23	41	+ 1h 09' 21"	
152	Franziska Brauße	Germany	Ceratizit Pro Cycling	26	105	+ 2h 18' 29"	
153	Kristýna Burlová	Czechia	Ceratizit Pro Cycling	23	DNF-6	–	
154	Elena Hartmann	Switzerland	Ceratizit Pro Cycling	34	49	+ 1h 28' 00"	
155	Daniek Hengeveld	Netherlands	Ceratizit Pro Cycling	22	50	+ 1h 29' 20"	
156	Célia Le Mouël	France	Ceratizit Pro Cycling	25	56	+ 1h 33' 42"	
157	Dilyxine Miermont	France	Ceratizit Pro Cycling	25	DNS-8	–	
161	Barbara Malcotti	Italy	Human Powered Health	25	13	+ 25' 08"	
162	Thalita de Jong	Netherlands	Human Powered Health	31	68	+ 1h 46' 55"	
163	Ruth Edwards	United States	Human Powered Health	32	30	+ 54' 10"	
164	Romy Kasper	Germany	Human Powered Health	37	86	+ 2h 09' 23"	
165	Mona Mitterwallner	Austria	Human Powered Health	23	65	+ 1h 45' 42"	
166	Marit Raaijmakers	Netherlands	Human Powered Health	26	72	+ 1h 51' 12"	
167	Lily Williams	United States	Human Powered Health	31	70	+ 1h 47' 47"	
171	Alicia González	Spain	St. Michel–Preference Home–Auber93	30	117	+ 2h 33' 14"	
172	Alison Avoine	France	St. Michel–Preference Home–Auber93	25	123	+ 2h 51' 03"	
173	Lucie Fityus	Australia	St. Michel–Preference Home–Auber93	24	OTL-2	–	
174	Émilie Morier	France	St. Michel–Preference Home–Auber93	28	25	+ 51' 58"	
175	Elyne Roussel ‡	France	St. Michel–Preference Home–Auber93	19	DNF-7	–	
176	Ségolène Thomas	France	St. Michel–Preference Home–Auber93	26	OTL-2	–	
177	Emily Watts	Australia	St. Michel–Preference Home–Auber93	24	114	+ 2h 25' 49"	
181	Ane Santesteban	Spain	Laboral Kutxa–Fundación Euskadi	34	35	+ 1h 02' 37"	
182	Alice Maria Arzuffi	Italy	Laboral Kutxa–Fundación Euskadi	30	63	+ 1h 44' 22"	
183	Idoia Eraso	Spain	Laboral Kutxa–Fundación Euskadi	23	106	+ 2h 19' 01"	
184	Usoa Ostolaza	Spain	Laboral Kutxa–Fundación Euskadi	27	40	+ 1h 09' 07"	
185	Catalina Anais Soto	Chile	Laboral Kutxa–Fundación Euskadi	24	119	+ 2h 34' 51"	
186	Alba Teruel	Spain	Laboral Kutxa–Fundación Euskadi	28	DNF-9	–	
187	Laura Tomasi	Italy	Laboral Kutxa–Fundación Euskadi	26	99	+ 2h 16' 19"	
191	Karolina Perekitko	Poland	Winspace Orange Seal	26	55	+ 1h 32' 16"	
192	Marine Allione	France	Winspace Orange Seal	24	102	+ 2h 16' 42"	
193	Nadia Gontova	Canada	Winspace Orange Seal	24	23	+ 46' 58"	
194	Kiara Lylyk ‡	Canada	Winspace Orange Seal	21	116	+ 2h 30' 57"	
195	Fiona Mangan	Ireland	Winspace Orange Seal	29	118	+ 2h 34' 00"	
196	Marie-Morgane Le Deunff	France	Winspace Orange Seal	23	OTL-2	–	
197	Constance Valentin	France	Winspace Orange Seal	27	91	+ 2h 11' 55"	
201	Eline Jansen	Netherlands	VolkerWessels Cycling Team	23	44	+ 1h 14' 47"	
202	Valerie Demey	Belgium	VolkerWessels Cycling Team	31	94	+ 2h 14' 04"	
203	Anneke Dijkstra	Netherlands	VolkerWessels Cycling Team	28	103	+ 2h 16' 44"	
204	Laura Molenaar	Netherlands	VolkerWessels Cycling Team	23	85	+ 2h 07' 50"	
205	Maud Rijnbeek	Netherlands	VolkerWessels Cycling Team	22	67	+ 1h 46' 49"	
206	Lonneke Uneken	Netherlands	VolkerWessels Cycling Team	25	115	+ 2h 30' 15"	
207	Margot Vanpachtenbeke	Belgium	VolkerWessels Cycling Team	26	29	+ 53' 16"	
211	Morgane Coston	France	Roland Le Dévoluy	34	46	+ 1h 22' 55"	
212	Tamara Dronova		Roland Le Dévoluy	31	96	+ 2h 15' 44"	
213	Mia Griffin	Ireland	Roland Le Dévoluy	26	97	+ 2h 15' 57"	
214	Elena Pirrone	Italy	Roland Le Dévoluy	26	OTL-2	–	
215	Kaja Rysz	Poland	Roland Le Dévoluy	26	101	+ 2h 16' 29"	
216	Petra Stiasny	Switzerland	Roland Le Dévoluy	23	53	+ 1h 31' 04"	
217	Sylvie Swinkels	Netherlands	Roland Le Dévoluy	25	DNF-2	–	

=== By team ===
(Germany) Canyon//SRAM Zondacrypto (CSZ)
No.	Rider	Pos.
1	Katarzyna Niewiadoma (POL)	3
2	Ricarda Bauernfeind (GER)	32
3	Neve Bradbury (AUS)	71
4	Chloé Dygert (USA)	DNS-9
5	Cecilie Uttrup Ludwig (DEN)	21
6	Soraya Paladin (ITA)	DNF-7
7	Agnieszka Skalniak-Sójka (POL)	DNS-5
Directeur sportif:
Voiture de soutien:

(France) FDJ–Suez (TFS)
No.	Rider	Pos.
11	Demi Vollering (NED)	2
12	Elise Chabbey (SUI)	28
13	Amber Kraak (NED)	51
14	Juliette Labous (FRA)	7
15	Marie Le Net (FRA)	58
16	Évita Muzic (FRA)	10
17	Ally Wollaston (NZL)	92
Directeur sportif:
Voiture de soutien:

(Belgium) Fenix–Deceuninck (FDC)
No.	Rider	Pos.
21	Pauliena Rooijakkers (NED)	9
22	Millie Couzens (GBR)	87
23	Yara Kastelijn (NED)	17
24	Flora Perkins (GBR)	121
25	Puck Pieterse (NED)	24
26	Christina Schweinberger (AUT)	64
27	Marthe Truyen (BEL)	108
Directeur sportif:
Voiture de soutien:

(United States) EF Education–Oatly (EFO)
No.	Rider	Pos.
31	Cédrine Kerbaol (FRA)	8
32	Letizia Borghesi (ITA)	95
33	Henrietta Christie (NZL)	80
34	Kristen Faulkner (USA)	DNF-5
35	Alison Jackson (CAN)	113
36	Noemi Rüegg (SUI)	60
37	Magdeleine Vallieres (CAN)	18
Directeur sportif:
Voiture de soutien:

(Netherlands) Team SD Worx–Protime (SDW)
No.	Rider	Pos.
41	Lotte Kopecky (BEL)	45
42	Mischa Bredewold (NED)	83
43	Elena Cecchini (ITA)	107
44	Femke Gerritse (NED)	100
45	Anna van der Breggen (NED)	11
46	Blanka Vas (HUN)	76
47	Lorena Wiebes (NED)	57
Directeur sportif:
Voiture de soutien:

(Netherlands) Visma–Lease a Bike (TVL)
No.	Rider	Pos.
51	Pauline Ferrand-Prévot (FRA)	1
52	Marion Bunel (FRA)	39
53	Femke de Vries (NED)	20
54	Lieke Nooijen (NED)	34
55	Eva van Agt (NED)	65
56	Marianne Vos (NED)	38
57	Imogen Wolff (GBR)	19
Directeur sportif:
Voiture de soutien:

(United Arab Emirates) UAE Team ADQ (UAD)
No.	Rider	Pos.
61	Elisa Longo Borghini (ITA)	DNS-3
62	Brodie Chapman (AUS)	DNS-9
63	Eleonora Camilla Gasparrini (ITA)	DNS-4
64	Lara Gillespie (IRL)	82
65	Maëva Squiban (FRA)	15
66	Karlijn Swinkels (NED)	DNF-5
67	Dominika Włodarczyk (POL)	4
Directeur sportif:
Voiture de soutien:

(Spain) Movistar Team (MOV)
No.	Rider	Pos.
71	Marlen Reusser (SUI)	DNF-1
72	Aude Biannic (FRA)	77
73	Jelena Erić (SRB)	112
74	Liane Lippert (GER)	59
75	Ana Vitória Magalhães (BRA)	74
76	Sara Martín (ESP)	120
77	Mareille Meijering (NED)	42
Directeur sportif:
Voiture de soutien:

(United States) Lidl–Trek (LTK)
No.	Rider	Pos.
81	Elisa Balsamo (ITA)	DNF-5
82	Lucinda Brand (NED)	47
83	Niamh Fisher-Black (NZL)	5
84	Riejanne Markus (NED)	22
85	Emma Norsgaard (DEN)	98
86	Lauretta Hanson (AUS)	75
87	Shirin van Anrooij (NED)	36
Directeur sportif:
Voiture de soutien:

(Belgium) AG Insurance–Soudal (AGS)
No.	Rider	Pos.
91	Kimberley Le Court (MRI)	16
92	Shari Bossuyt (BEL)	81
93	Justine Ghekiere (BEL)	14
94	Sarah Gigante (AUS)	6
95	Ilse Pluimers (NED)	111
96	Julie Van de Velde (BEL)	62
97	Gladys Verhulst-Wild (FRA)	DNF-9
Directeur sportif:
Voiture de soutien:

(Netherlands) Team Picnic–PostNL (TPP)
No.	Rider	Pos.
101	Charlotte Kool (NED)	DNS-2
102	Francesca Barale (ITA)	48
103	Rachele Barbieri (ITA)	104
104	Pfeiffer Georgi (GBR)	52
105	Megan Jastrab (USA)	54
106	Franziska Koch (GER)	38
107	Nienke Vinke (NED)	19
Directeur sportif:
Voiture de soutien:

(France) Arkéa–B&B Hotels Women (ARK)
No.	Rider	Pos.
111	Valentina Cavallar (AUT)	DNS-6
112	Lotte Claes (BEL)	31
113	Emilia Fahlin (SWE)	124
114	Clémence Latimier (FRA)	61
115	Titia Ryo (FRA)	26
116	Maurène Trégouet (FRA)	122
117	Marjolein van 't Geloof (NED)	DNF-5
Directeur sportif:
Voiture de soutien:

(Australia) Liv AlUla Jayco (LIV)
No.	Rider	Pos.
121	Letizia Paternoster (ITA)	84
122	Mavi García (ESP)	27
123	Jeanne Korevaar (NED)	109
124	Ruby Roseman-Gannon (AUS)	78
125	Silke Smulders (NED)	43
126	Monica Trinca Colonel (ITA)	DNF-5
127	Ella Wyllie (NZL)	12
Directeur sportif:
Voiture de soutien:

(Norway) Uno-X Mobility (UXM)
No.	Rider	Pos.
131	Katrine Aalerud (NOR)	DNF-5
132	Susanne Andersen (NOR)	OTL-8
133	Teuntje Beekhuis (NED)	110
134	Maria Giulia Confalonieri (ITA)	DNF-5
135	Rebecca Koerner (DEN)	DNS-4
136	Mie Bjørndal Ottestad (NOR)	DNS-6
137	Linda Zanetti (SUI)	79
Directeur sportif:
Voiture de soutien:

(France) Cofidis (CWT)
No.	Rider	Pos.
141	Victoire Berteau (FRA)	69
142	Julie Bego (FRA)	33
143	Eugenia Bujak (SLO)	DNF-5
144	Amalie Dideriksen (DEN)	73
145	Clara Koppenburg (GER)	88
146	Hannah Ludwig (GER)	90
147	Nadia Quagliotto (ITA)	93
Directeur sportif:
Voiture de soutien:

(Germany) Ceratizit Pro Cycling (CTC)
No.	Rider	Pos.
151	Sarah Van Dam (CAN)	41
152	Franziska Brauße (GER)	105
153	Kristýna Burlová (CZE)	DNF-6
154	Elena Hartmann (SUI)	49
155	Daniek Hengeveld (NED)	50
156	Célia Le Mouel (FRA)	56
157	Dilyxine Miermont (FRA)	DNS-8
Directeur sportif:
Voiture de soutien:

(United States) Human Powered Health (HPH)
No.	Rider	Pos.
161	Barbara Malcotti (ITA)	13
162	Thalita de Jong (NED)	68
163	Ruth Edwards (USA)	30
164	Romy Kasper (GER)	86
165	Mona Mitterwallner (AUT)	65
166	Marit Raaijmakers (NED)	72
167	Lily Williams (USA)	70
Directeur sportif:
Voiture de soutien:

(France) St. Michel–Preference Home–Auber93 (AUB)
No.	Rider	Pos.
171	Alicia González (ESP)	117
172	Alison Avoine (FRA)	123
173	Lucie Fityus (AUS)	OTL-2
174	Emilie Morier (FRA)	25
175	Elyne Roussel (FRA)	DNF-7
176	Ségolène Thomas (FRA)	OTL-2
177	Emily Watts (AUS)	114
Directeur sportif:
Voiture de soutien:

(Spain) Laboral Kutxa–Fundación Euskadi (LKF)
No.	Rider	Pos.
181	Ane Santesteban (ESP)	35
182	Alice Maria Arzuffi (ITA)	63
183	Idoia Eraso (ESP)	106
184	Usoa Ostolaza (ESP)	40
185	Catalina Anais Soto (CHI)	119
186	Alba Teruel (ESP)	DNF-9
187	Laura Tomasi (ITA)	99
Directeur sportif:
Voiture de soutien:

(France) Winspace Orange Seal (WOS)
No.	Rider	Pos.
191	Karolina Perekito (POL)	55
192	Marine Allione (FRA)	102
193	Nadia Gontova (CAN)	23
194	Kiara Lylyk (CAN)	116
195	Fiona Mangan (IRL)	118
196	Marie-Morgane Le Deunff (FRA)	OTL-2
197	Constance Valentin (FRA)	91
Directeur sportif:
Voiture de soutien:

(Netherlands) VolkerWessels Cycling Team (VWM)
No.	Rider	Pos.
201	Eline Jansen (NED)	44
202	Valerie Demey (BEL)	94
203	Anneke Dijkstra (NED)	103
204	Laura Molenaar (NED)	85
205	Maud Rijnbeek (NED)	67
206	Lonneke Uneken (NED)	115
207	Margot Vanpachtenbeke (BEL)	29
Directeur sportif:
Voiture de soutien:

(Switzerland) Roland Le Dévoluy (CGS)
No.	Rider	Pos.
211	Morgane Coston (FRA)	46
212	Tamara Dronova	96
213	Mia Griffin (IRL)	97
214	Elena Pirrone (ITA)	OTL-2
215	Kaja Rysz (POL)	101
216	Petra Stiasny (SUI)	53
217	Sylvie Swinkels (NED)	DNF-2
Directeur sportif:
Voiture de soutien:

=== By nationality ===
Country	No. of riders	Finished	Stage wins
Australia	7	5	
Austria	3	2	
Belgium	8	8	
Brazil	1	1	
Canada	5	5	
Chile	1	1	
Czechia	1	0	
Denmark	4	3	
France	23	18	4 (Pauline Ferrand-Prévot x2, Maëva Squiban x2)
Germany	7	7	
Great Britain	4	4	
Hungary	1	1	
Ireland	3	3	
Italy	16	9	
Mauritius	1	1	1 (Kimberley Le Court)
Netherlands	34	30	3 (Marianne Vos, Lorena Wiebes x2)
New Zealand	4	4	
Norway	3	0	
Poland	6	5	
Serbia	1	1	
Slovenia	1	0	
Spain	7	6	1 (Mavi García)
Sweden	1	1	
Switzerland	6	5	
United States	5	3	
	1	1	
Total	154	124	9
