= Lotte Claes =

Belgian cyclist

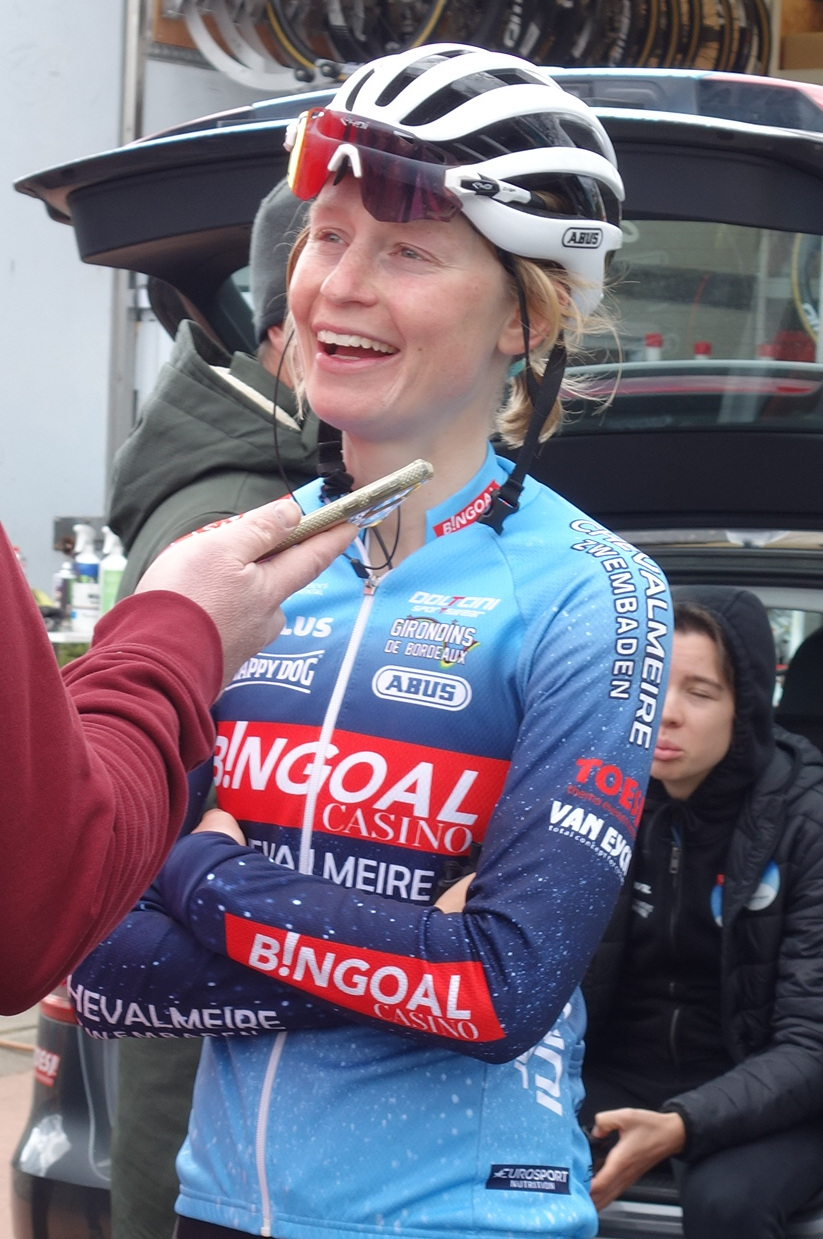
- Claes in 2022

Personal information
- Born: 3 May 1993 (age 33) Sint-Niklaas, Belgium

Cycling career
- Sport: Cycling
- Current team: Arkéa–B&B Hotels Women
- Discipline: Road
- Role: Rider

Professional teams
- 2021: Doltcini–Van Eyck–Proximus
- 2022: Bingoal Casino–Chevalmeire–Van Eyck Sport
- 2023: Stade Rochelais Charente-Maritime
- 2024–2025: Arkéa–B&B Hotels Women
- 2026: Fenix–Premier Tech

Major wins
- One-day races and Classics National Time Trial Championships (2026) Omloop Het Nieuwsblad (2025)

Lotte Claes (born 5 May 1993) is a Belgian professional racing cyclist and duathlete, who currently rides for UCI Women's ProTeam Fenix–Premier Tech. In 2025, she won the Omloop Het Nieuwsblad from the breakaway, outsprinting Aurela Nerlo. She also finished second at the 2022 World Triathlon Long Distance Duathlon Championships and third the following year.

== Major results ==
2022
9th Overall Tour Cycliste Féminin International de l'Ardèche
10th Overall Tour Féminin International des Pyrénées
2023
4th Overall Vuelta a Andalucía
4th Championnats d'Europe des Grimpeurs
6th Gran Premio Ciudad de Eibar
9th Durango-Durango Emakumeen Saria
9th Grand Prix Féminin de Chambéry
10th Overall Tour Féminin International des Pyrénées
2024
6th Overall Tour Féminin International des Pyrénées
9th Alpes Grésivaudan Classic
2025 (1 pro win)
1st Omloop Het Nieuwsblad
2026
1st Time trial, National Road Championships
10th Tour Down Under
