= 2025 Tour de France Femmes, Stage 1 to Stage 9 =

The 2025 Tour de France Femmes (officially Tour de France Femmes avec Zwift) was the fourth edition of the Tour de France Femmes. The race took place from 26 July to 3 August 2025 and was the 22nd race in the 2025 UCI Women's World Tour calendar. The race was organised by the Amaury Sport Organisation (ASO), which also organises the men's Tour de France. The race was extended to nine days, making it the longest Tour de France Femmes, and the longest event on the UCI Women's World Tour calendar. Furthermore, the length of the race was extended to nine days, with nine stages.

== Overview ==
Stage characteristics
| Stage | Date | Course | Distance | Type |
|---|---|---|---|---|
| 1 | 26 July | Vannes to Plumelec | 78.8 km (49.0 mi) | Hilly stage |
| 2 | 27 July | Brest to Quimper | 110.4 km (68.6 mi) | Hilly stage |
| 3 | 28 July | La Gacilly to Angers | 163.5 km (101.6 mi) | Flat stage |
| 4 | 29 July | Saumur to Poitiers | 130.7 km (81.2 mi) | Flat stage |
| 5 | 30 July | Chasseneuil-du-Poitou (Futuroscope) to Guéret | 165.8 km (103.0 mi) | Medium-mountain stage |
| 6 | 31 July | Clermont-Ferrand to Ambert | 123.7 km (76.9 mi) | Mountain stage |
| 7 | 1 August | Bourg-en-Bresse to Chambéry | 159.7 km (99.2 mi) | Hilly stage |
| 8 | 2 August | Chambéry to Saint-François-Longchamp (Col de la Madeleine) | 111.9 km (69.5 mi) | Mountain stage |
| 9 | 3 August | Praz-sur-Arly to Châtel | 124.1 km (77.1 mi) | Mountain stage |
| Total | | | 1,168.6 km (726.1 mi) | |

== Classification standings ==
Legend
| Denotes the leader of the General classification | Denotes the leader of the Mountains classification |
| Denotes the leader of the Points classification | Denotes the leader of the Young rider classification |
| Denotes the leader of the Team classification | Denotes the winner of the Combativity award |

== Stage 1 ==
26 July 2025 – Vannes to Plumelec, 78.8 km (49.0 mi)

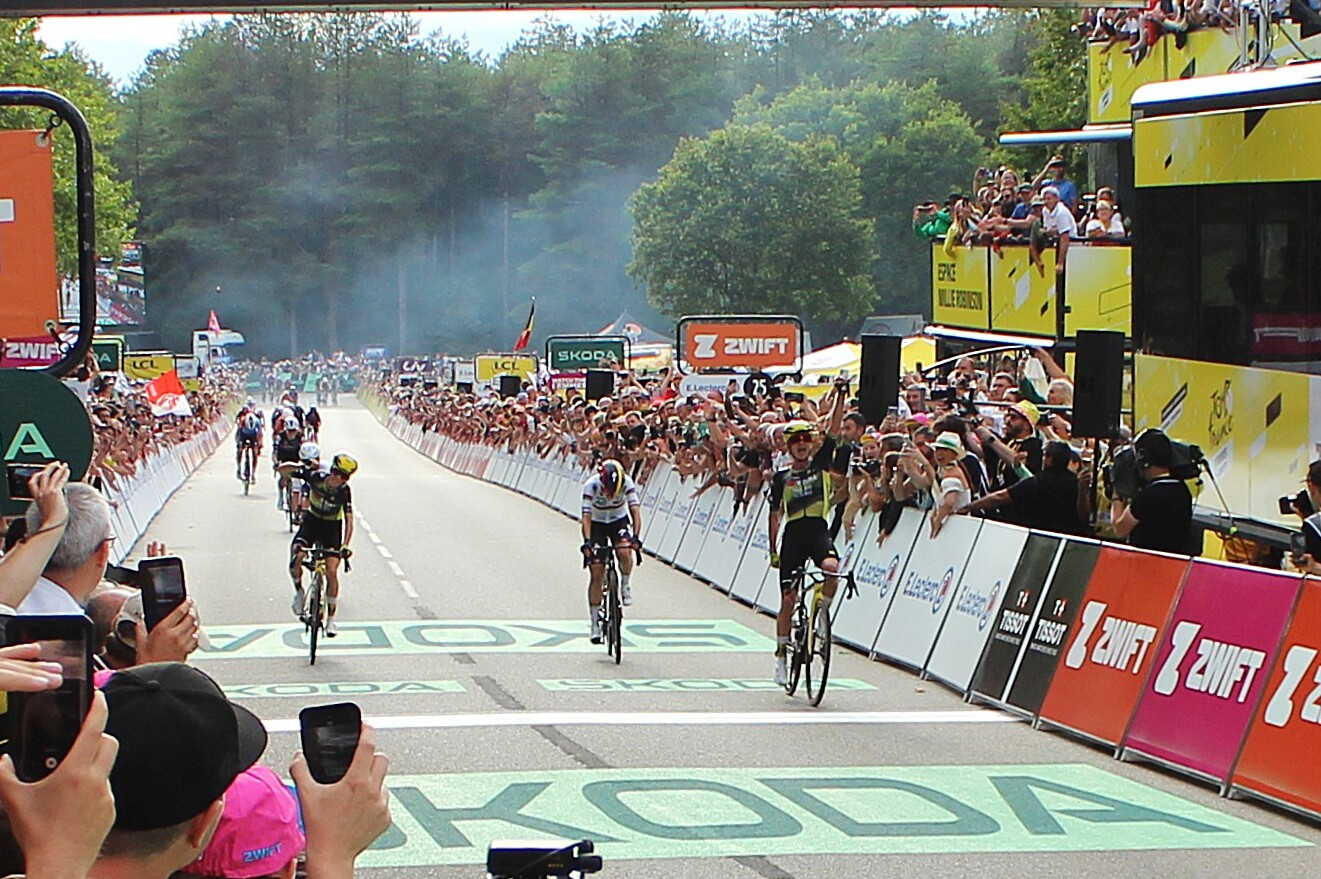
Finish of the stage in Plumelec

The first stage of the race took place in Brittany (the host of the Grand Départ), with a 78.8 km (49.0 mi) hilly course from Vannes to Plumelec. The stage featured two categorised climbs, with the finishing circuit in Plumelec having three ascents of the short but steep fourth-category climb of Côte de Cadoudal (1.7 km with an average gradient of 6.2%).

Maud Rijnbeek (VolkerWessels Cycling Team) and Laura Tomasi (Laboral Kutxa–Fundación Euskadi) escaped the peloton in the early part of the stage, but the bunch ensured that they were not given a large gap. Rijnbeek took the two points available at the first categorised climb after Tomasi dropped back, but the peloton led by Visma–Lease a Bike swallowed the break with around 45 kilometres (28 mi) remaining. With around 30 kilometres (19 mi) to go, the peloton entered the finishing circuit. Approaching the intermediate sprint on the first pass of Côte de Cadoudal, a large crash involved Movistar Team teammates Liane Lippert and Marlen Reusser – both riders remounted, however Reusser did not rejoin the pack. In the intermediate sprint, Lorena Wiebes (Team SD Worx–Protime) beat Franziska Koch (Team Picnic–PostNL). With 13 kilometres (8.1 mi) remaining, the peloton tackled the Côte de Cadoudal for the second time, with mountain points on offer. Wiebes and Koch were beaten by Elise Chabbey (FDJ–Suez), with Chabbey taking the lead in the Queen of the Mountains (QoM) classification.

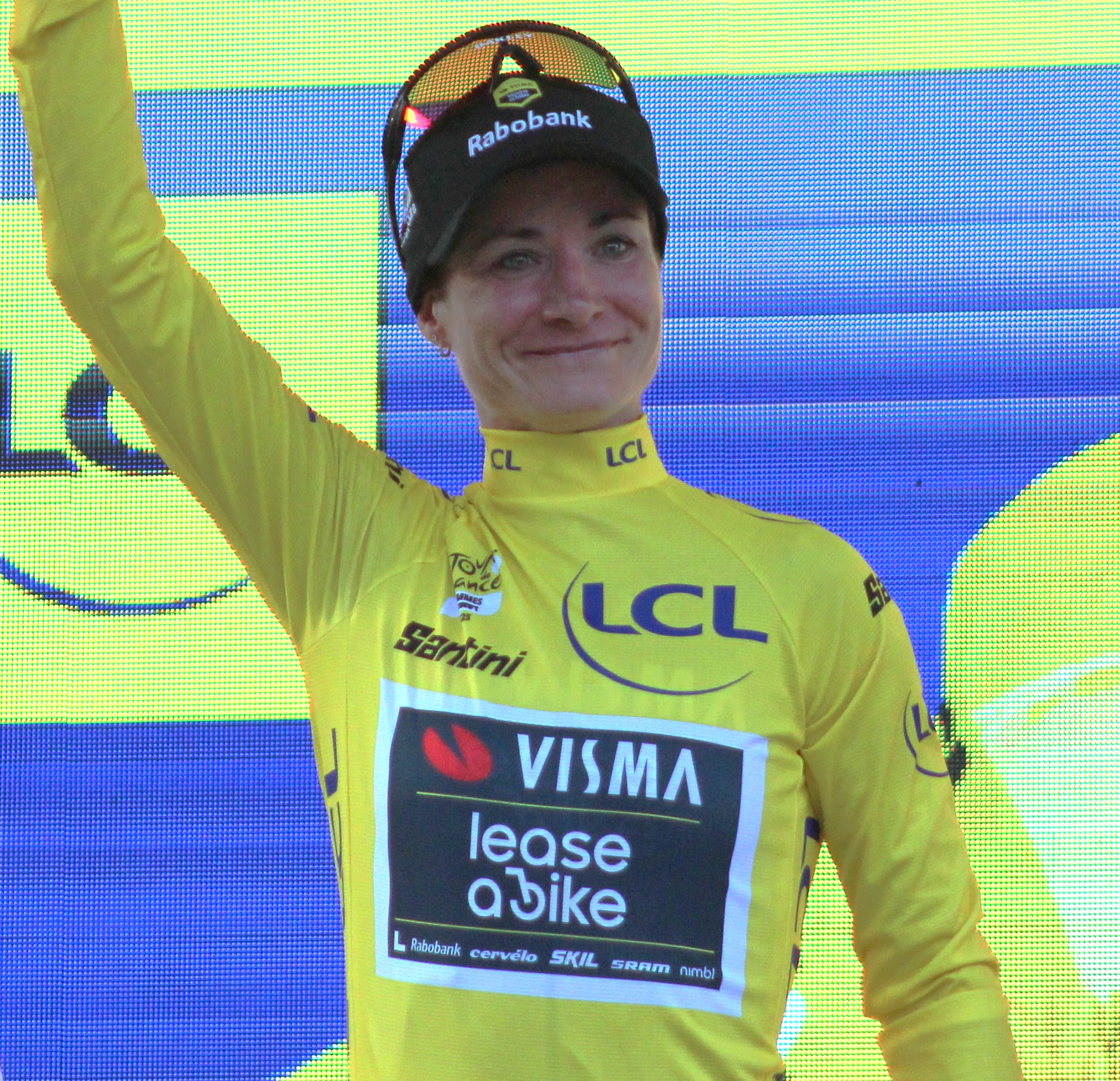
Marianne Vos, winner of stage 1 in the yellow jersey

In the closing stages, several riders attempted to break out to win the first stage, with Visma–Lease a Bike chasing them back. In the uphill sprint for the finish line, Pauline Ferrand-Prévot (Visma–Lease a Bike) pulled out a gap and looked set to win the stage before tiring in the last 100 metres, with Kimberley Le Court (AG Insurance–Soudal) and Marianne Vos (Visma–Lease a Bike) overtaking her. Vos therefore won the third Tour stage in her career, taking the yellow jersey of the general classification (GC) as well as taking the lead in the points classification. The majority of GC contenders finished in the bunch, with the exception of Reusser who abandoned the race, suffering from illness that had previously affected her at the Giro d'Italia Women.

Stage 1 Result
| Rank | Rider | Team | Time |
|---|---|---|---|
| 1 | Marianne Vos (NED) | Visma–Lease a Bike | 1h 53' 03" |
| 2 | Kimberley Le Court (MRI) | AG Insurance–Soudal | + 0" |
| 3 | Pauline Ferrand-Prévot (FRA) | Visma–Lease a Bike | + 0" |
| 4 | Katarzyna Niewiadoma-Phinney (POL) | Canyon//SRAM Zondacrypto | + 0" |
| 5 | Demi Vollering (NED) | FDJ–Suez | + 3" |
| 6 | Puck Pieterse (NED) | Fenix–Deceuninck | + 5" |
| 7 | Anna van der Breggen (NED) | Team SD Worx–Protime | + 5" |
| 8 | Eline Jansen (NED) | VolkerWessels Cycling Team | + 9" |
| 9 | Pauliena Rooijakkers (NED) | Fenix–Deceuninck | + 9" |
| 10 | Pfeiffer Georgi (GBR) | Team Picnic–PostNL | + 9" |

General classification after Stage 1
| Rank | Rider | Team | Time |
|---|---|---|---|
| 1 | Marianne Vos (NED) | Visma–Lease a Bike | 1h 52' 53" |
| 2 | Kimberley Le Court (MRI) | AG Insurance–Soudal | + 4" |
| 3 | Pauline Ferrand-Prévot (FRA) | Visma–Lease a Bike | + 6" |
| 4 | Katarzyna Niewiadoma-Phinney (POL) | Canyon//SRAM Zondacrypto | + 10" |
| 5 | Demi Vollering (NED) | FDJ–Suez | + 13" |
| 6 | Puck Pieterse (NED) | Fenix–Deceuninck | + 15" |
| 7 | Anna van der Breggen (NED) | Team SD Worx–Protime | + 15" |
| 8 | Eline Jansen (NED) | VolkerWessels Cycling Team | + 19" |
| 9 | Pauliena Rooijakkers (NED) | Fenix–Deceuninck | + 19" |
| 10 | Pfeiffer Georgi (GBR) | Team Picnic–PostNL | + 19" |

== Stage 2 ==
27 July 2025 – Brest to Quimper, 110.4 km (68.6 mi)

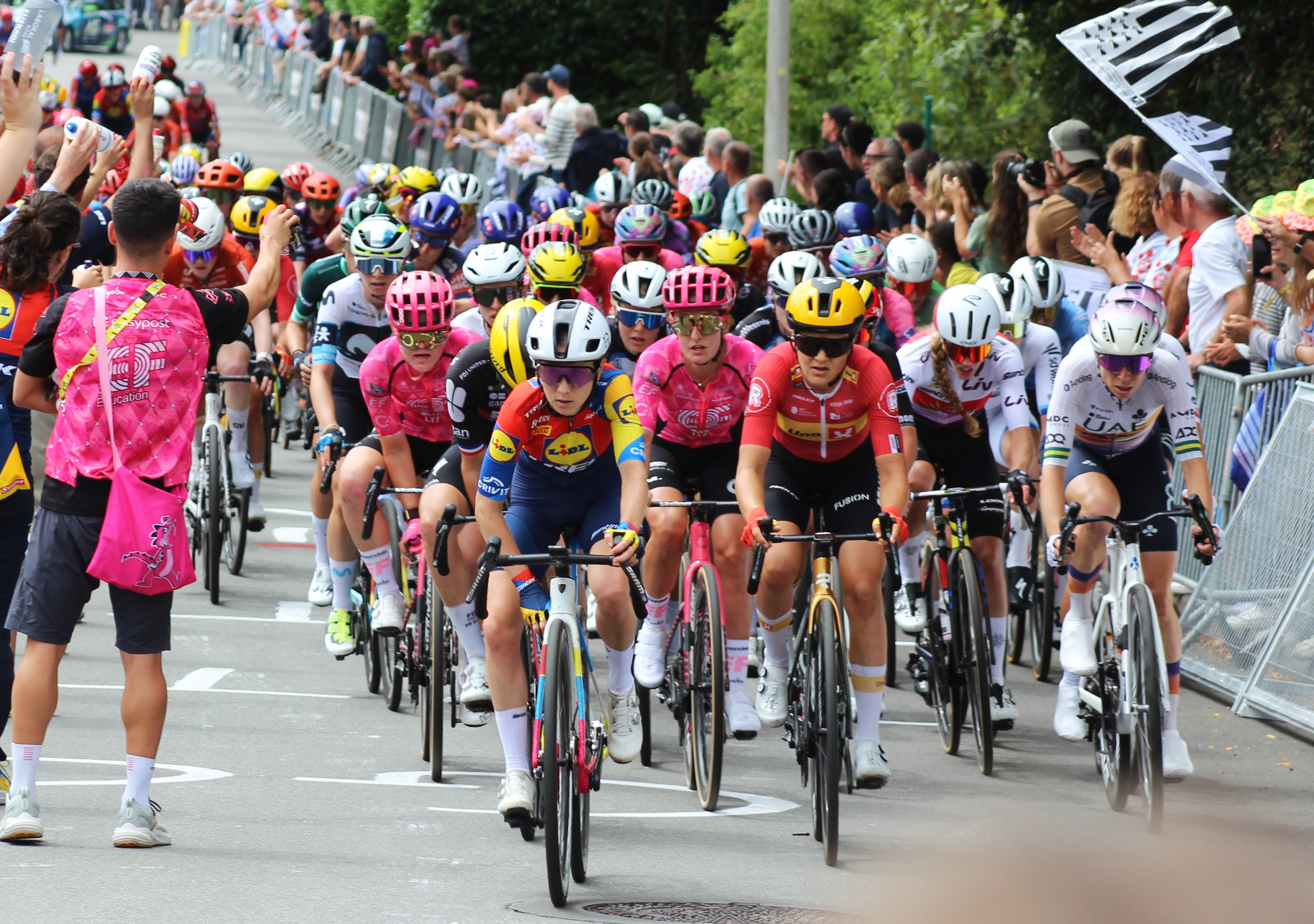
Peloton in Quimper

The second stage of the race remained in Brittany, taking riders on a 110.4 km (68.6 mi) hilly course from Brest to Quimper, with four categorised climbs (one third-category and three fourth-category) including two ascents of the fourth-category climb of Côte du Chemin de Troheir (1.1km with an average gradient of 5.7%) on the finishing circuit in Quimper. Bonus seconds were available at the un-categorised climb of Rue de Pen ar Stang in Quimper with 22.9 km (14.2 mi) to the finish.

Prior to the start of the stage, Charlotte Kool (Team Picnic–PostNL) withdrew from the race after struggling following a crash at the Baloise Ladies Tour earlier in July. Early in the stage, a breakaway of two riders was established – Aude Biannic (Movistar Team) and winner of the stage 1 combativity prize, Franziska Koch. The gap to the peloton was never larger than a minute, with Wiebes beating Vos to take the third place at the intermediate sprint with 65 kilometres (40 mi) to go. The peloton caught the break soon after. On the climb of Menez Quelerc'h with around 60 kilometres (37 mi) remaining, Silke Smulders (Liv AlUla Jayco) pulled away from the peloton, closely followed by Chabbey in the polka dot jersey of the QoM classification. The pair turned into a new breakaway, quickly pulling out a lead of 15 seconds. Rijnbeek escaped the peloton to join Smulders and Chabbey, with the trio having a lead of around 50 seconds with 45 kilometres (28 mi) to go. Chabbey then took more mountains points on the Côte de Locronan and the first ascent of the Côte du Chemin de Troheir, stretching her lead in the QoM classification. Behind the trio, Le Court required a bike change and needed to chase back to the peloton.

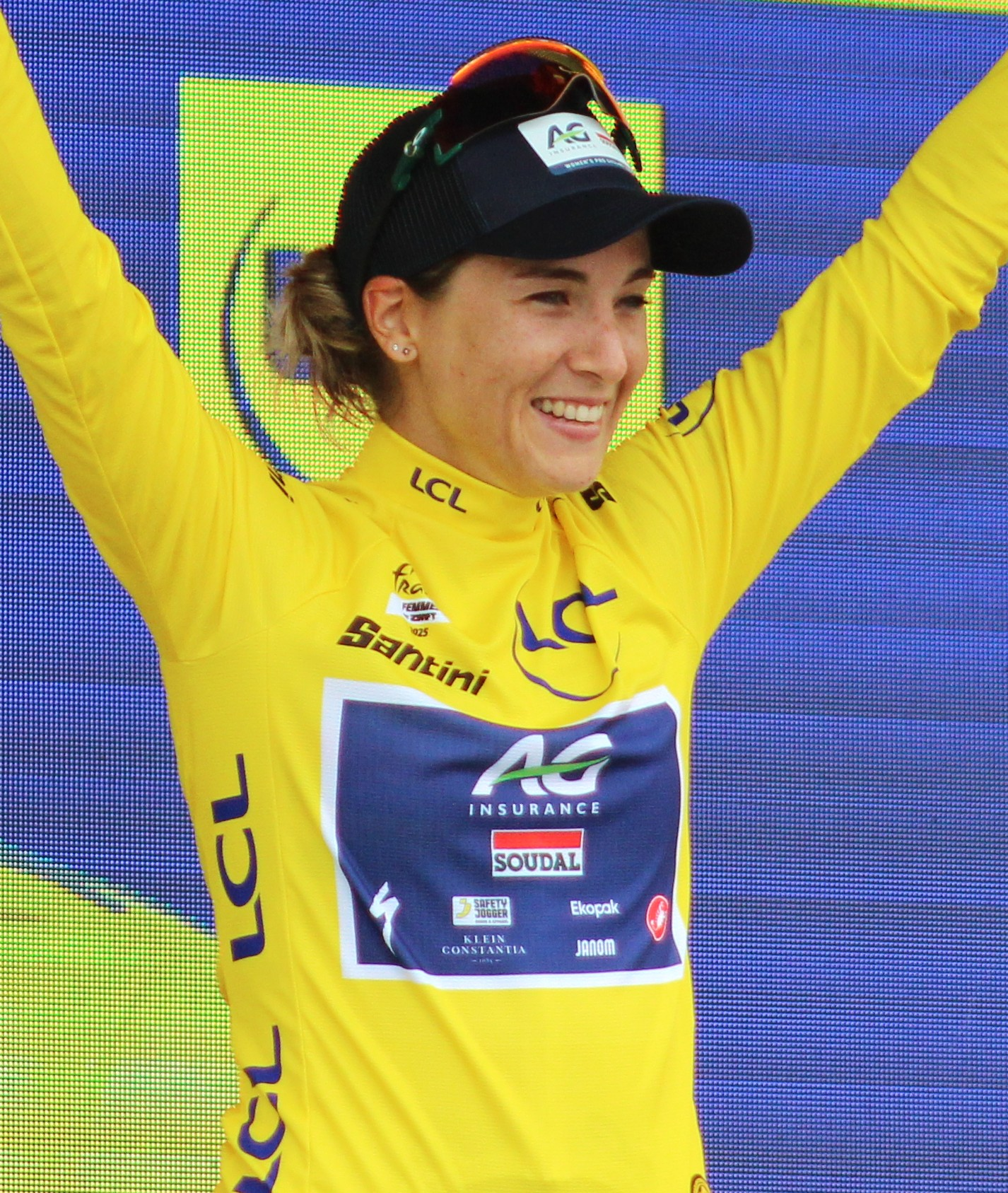
Kimberley Le Court in the yellow jersey

With 25 kilometres (16 mi) remaining, the trio (with Maëva Squiban (UAE Team ADQ) replacing Rijnbeek) had a 40 second lead – however, this fell fast as the peloton gave chase. On the un-categorised climb of Rue de Pen ar Stang in Quimper, Katarzyna Niewiadoma-Phinney (Canyon//SRAM Zondacrypto) and Ferrand-Prévot broke away from the peloton, quickly pulling out a gap of 10 seconds. However, the peloton led by Visma–Lease a Bike slowly reduced the gap, with the bunch unified with 12 kilometres (7.5 mi) to go in the stage. With 9 kilometres (5.6 mi) to the finish, Mavi García (Liv AlUla Jayco) then attacked on a descent, pulling out a lead of 15 seconds. García held off the peloton in the closing kilometres, maintaining her advantage on the final ascent of Côte du Chemin de Troheir and entering the final kilometre with a 10 second lead. The peloton gave chase on the steep climb to the finish, however García held on to take her first stage win at the Tour de France Femmes, becoming the oldest woman to win a stage of the Tour. Wiebes was the first of the chasing pack to cross the finish line, just 3 seconds behind. García was delighted by her win, noting that at 41 years old (the oldest rider in the race) she had considered retirement from cycling. becoming the oldest woman to win a stage of the Tour de France Femmes.

Le Court took the yellow jersey of the GC owing to her higher placed stage finishes, being level on time with Vos. Other GC contenders remained within 20 seconds. Vos and Bego maintained their leads in the points and youth classifications respectively, and Chabbey extended her lead in the QoM classification to 4 points.

Stage 2 Result
| Rank | Rider | Team | Time |
|---|---|---|---|
| 1 | Mavi García (ESP) | Liv AlUla Jayco | 2h 44' 29" |
| 2 | Lorena Wiebes (NED) | Team SD Worx–Protime | + 3" |
| 3 | Kimberley Le Court (MRI) | AG Insurance–Soudal | + 3" |
| 4 | Liane Lippert (GER) | Movistar Team | + 3" |
| 5 | Marianne Vos (NED) | Visma–Lease a Bike | + 3" |
| 6 | Katarzyna Niewiadoma-Phinney (POL) | Canyon//SRAM Zondacrypto | + 3" |
| 7 | Demi Vollering (NED) | FDJ–Suez | + 3" |
| 8 | Pauline Ferrand-Prévot (FRA) | Visma–Lease a Bike | + 3" |
| 9 | Puck Pieterse (NED) | Fenix–Deceuninck | + 3" |
| 10 | Anna van der Breggen (NED) | Team SD Worx–Protime | + 3" |

General classification after Stage 2
| Rank | Rider | Team | Time |
|---|---|---|---|
| 1 | Kimberley Le Court (MRI) | AG Insurance–Soudal | 4h 37' 25" |
| 2 | Marianne Vos (NED) | Visma–Lease a Bike | + 0" |
| 3 | Pauline Ferrand-Prévot (FRA) | Visma–Lease a Bike | + 6" |
| 4 | Katarzyna Niewiadoma-Phinney (POL) | Canyon//SRAM Zondacrypto | + 10" |
| 5 | Demi Vollering (NED) | FDJ–Suez | + 13" |
| 6 | Puck Pieterse (NED) | Fenix–Deceuninck | + 15" |
| 7 | Anna van der Breggen (NED) | Team SD Worx–Protime | + 15" |
| 8 | Pauliena Rooijakkers (NED) | Fenix–Deceuninck | + 19" |
| 9 | Niamh Fisher-Black (NZL) | Lidl–Trek | + 19" |
| 10 | Chloé Dygert (USA) | Canyon//SRAM Zondacrypto | + 19" |

== Stage 3 ==
28 July 2025 – La Gacilly to Angers, 163.5 km (101.6 mi)

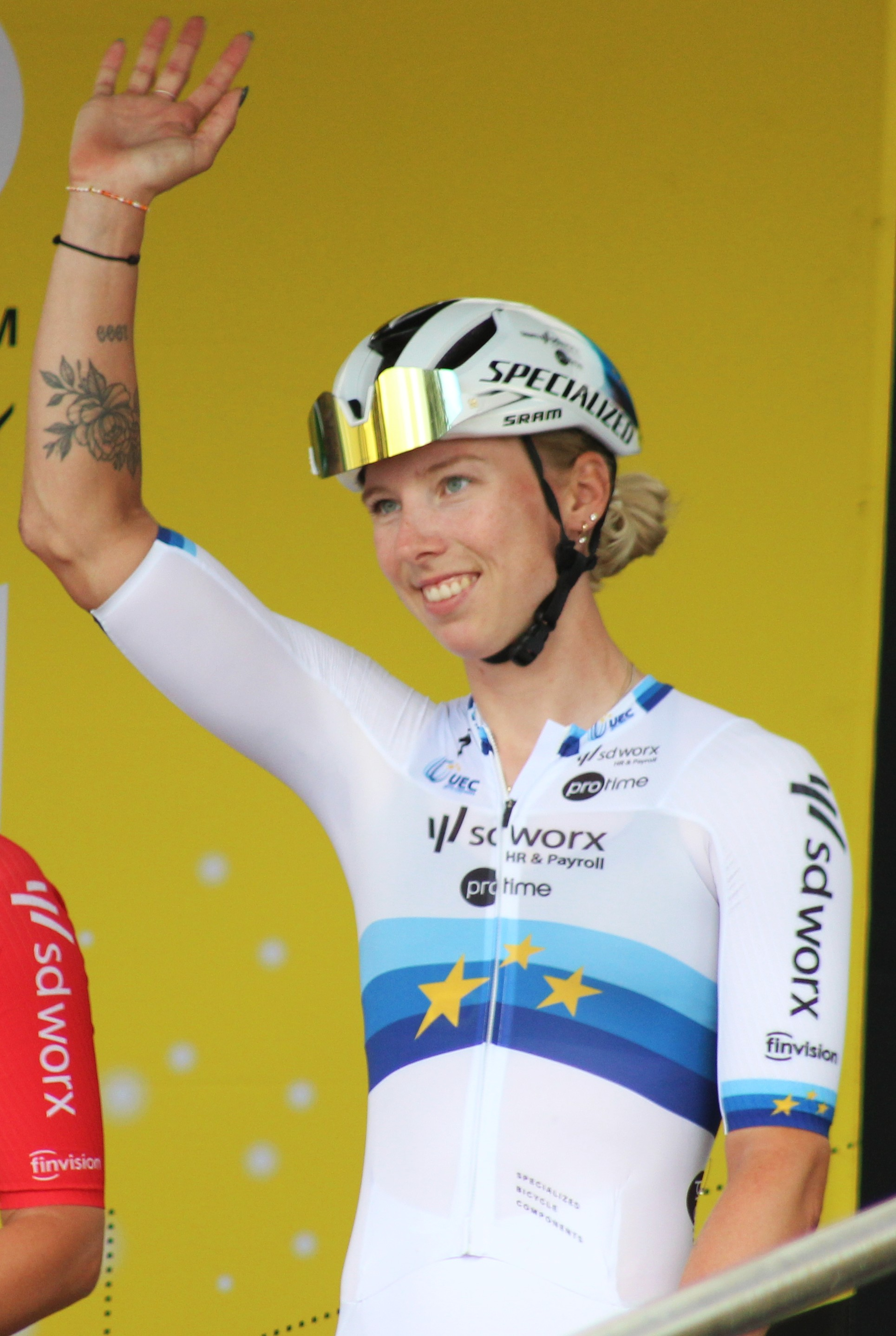
Winner of stage 3, Lorena Wiebes pictured prior to the stage

The third stage took riders eastwards from La Gacilly in Brittany to Angers on a flat 163.5-kilometre (101.6 mi) course, with one fourth-category climb early on in the stage. The stage was expected to feature the first bunch sprint of the race.

Prior to the start of the stage, Elisa Longo Borghini (UAE Team ADQ) withdrew from the race after struggling with gastroenteritis for the first two stages – the second GC contender to abandon the race. Several riders attempted to go into the break before a four-rider group composed of Alison Jackson (EF Education–Oatly), Clémence Latimier (Arkéa–B&B Hotels Women), Sara Martín (Movistar Team), and Catalina Soto (Laboral Kutxa–Fundación Euskadi) was able to get away after 13 kilometres (8.1 mi) of racing. A few riders tried to bridge to the front group but they were eventually swallowed up by the peloton. The lead quartet's advantage maxed out at just under five minutes with Team SD Worx–Protime taking up most of the controlling in the peloton. On the only categorized climb on the day, Jackson took maximum QoM points ahead of Martín. At the intermediate sprint with just under 40 kilometres (25 mi) left, Wiebes outsprinted Vos to take the remaining maximum points behind the break. Throughout the day, there were a few crashes in the peloton with some riders needing medical attention.

Heading into the final 11 kilometres (6.8 mi), the break still had a lead of half a minute but the cohesion began to dwindle down as they soon attacked each other. Their advantage continued to plummet until they were caught with just under 6 kilometres (3.7 mi) left. 3.3 kilometres (2.1 mi) from the finish, a big crash took down several riders, most notably including Demi Vollering (FDJ–Suez), one of the favourites for the GC, while Le Court was caught behind the crash. Vollering had to be helped by her teammates to reach the finish line, with her team reporting that she had "pain at the knees, a pain at the glutes and pain at the back" and that she would be checked at the hospital. Because of the five kilometre rule, all riders caught behind the crash were credited with the same time as the front group. The crash left a small group out front to contest for the win. In the final sprint, Wiebes launched her sprint with Vos on her wheel. Vos was not able to come around as Wiebes took the stage, taking the lead in the points classification. With her second place, Vos regained the yellow jersey from Le Court.

Stage 3 Result
| Rank | Rider | Team | Time |
|---|---|---|---|
| 1 | Lorena Wiebes (NED) | Team SD Worx–Protime | 3h 41' 47" |
| 2 | Marianne Vos (NED) | Visma–Lease a Bike | + 0" |
| 3 | Ally Wollaston (NZL) | FDJ–Suez | + 0" |
| 4 | Megan Jastrab (USA) | Team Picnic–PostNL | + 0" |
| 5 | Liane Lippert (GER) | Movistar Team | + 0" |
| 6 | Shari Bossuyt (BEL) | AG Insurance–Soudal | + 0" |
| 7 | Eline Jansen (NED) | VolkerWessels Cycling Team | + 0" |
| 8 | Katarzyna Niewiadoma-Phinney (POL) | Canyon//SRAM Zondacrypto | + 0" |
| 9 | Noemi Rüegg (SUI) | EF Education–Oatly | + 0" |
| 10 | Lucinda Brand (NED) | Lidl–Trek | + 0" |

General classification after Stage 3
| Rank | Rider | Team | Time |
|---|---|---|---|
| 1 | Marianne Vos (NED) | Visma–Lease a Bike | 8h 19' 06" |
| 2 | Kimberley Le Court (MRI) | AG Insurance–Soudal | + 6" |
| 3 | Pauline Ferrand-Prévot (FRA) | Visma–Lease a Bike | + 12" |
| 4 | Katarzyna Niewiadoma-Phinney (POL) | Canyon//SRAM Zondacrypto | + 16" |
| 5 | Lorena Wiebes (NED) | Team SD Worx–Protime | + 16" |
| 6 | Demi Vollering (NED) | FDJ–Suez | + 19" |
| 7 | Anna van der Breggen (NED) | Team SD Worx–Protime | + 21" |
| 8 | Puck Pieterse (NED) | Fenix–Deceuninck | + 21" |
| 9 | Pauliena Rooijakkers (NED) | Fenix–Deceuninck | + 25" |
| 10 | Niamh Fisher-Black (NZL) | Lidl–Trek | + 25" |

== Stage 4 ==
29 July 2025 – Saumur to Poitiers, 130.7 km (81.2 mi)

The fourth stage took the riders southwest from Saumur to Poitiers on a flat 130.7-kilometre (81.2 mi) course, with one fourth-category climb. A bunch sprint was expected.

Before the stage, FDJ–Suez announced that Vollering was cleared to start the stage after tests following her crash on stage 3. Multiple riders attempted to go into the break until Rijnbeek was able to escape with around 100 kilometres (62 mi) to go. A few riders tried to bridge up to her before she was eventually joined by Koch and Ana Vitória Magalhães (Movistar Team). Their lead never went above two minutes with the peloton keeping the trio on a tight leash. With 66 kilometres (41 mi) left, there was a brief split in the peloton due to crosswinds but there was not much of a gap and the split was quickly undone. A few kilometres later, the trio up front became a duo as Rijnbeek was dropped. As the race approached the intermediate sprint with 44 kilometres (27 mi) to go, the break took maximum points before Wiebes crossed the line in front of Vos to extend her lead in the points classification.

At 29 kilometres (18 mi) from the finish, Magalhães took maximum QoM points ahead of Koch but at this point, their lead was just around a minute. The gap gradually went down as the peloton led by Team SD Worx–Protime picked up the pace, until the break was caught with around 4 kilometres (2.5 mi) left. The race headed to the expected bunch sprint, where Wiebes was able to hold off Vos to win her second successive stage. Her victory allowed her to jump up to second overall and further extend her lead in the points classification while Vos kept the yellow jersey by a margin of 12 seconds. Vollering completed the stage with the main group, noting anxieties after her crash on stage 3.

Stage 4 Result
| Rank | Rider | Team | Time |
|---|---|---|---|
| 1 | Lorena Wiebes (NED) | Team SD Worx–Protime | 2h 54' 11" |
| 2 | Marianne Vos (NED) | Visma–Lease a Bike | + 0" |
| 3 | Lara Gillespie (IRL) | UAE Team ADQ | + 0" |
| 4 | Eline Jansen (NED) | VolkerWessels Cycling Team | + 0" |
| 5 | Chloé Dygert (USA) | Canyon//SRAM Zondacrypto | + 0" |
| 6 | Shari Bossuyt (BEL) | AG Insurance–Soudal | + 0" |
| 7 | Rachele Barbieri (ITA) | Team Picnic–PostNL | + 0" |
| 8 | Linda Zanetti (SUI) | Uno-X Mobility | + 0" |
| 9 | Alicia González Blanco (ESP) | St. Michel–Preference Home–Auber93 | + 0" |
| 10 | Sarah Van Dam (CAN) | Ceratizit Pro Cycling | + 0" |

General classification after Stage 4
| Rank | Rider | Team | Time |
|---|---|---|---|
| 1 | Marianne Vos (NED) | Visma–Lease a Bike | 11h 13' 11" |
| 2 | Lorena Wiebes (NED) | Team SD Worx–Protime | + 12" |
| 3 | Kimberley Le Court (MRI) | AG Insurance–Soudal | + 12" |
| 4 | Pauline Ferrand-Prévot (FRA) | Visma–Lease a Bike | + 18" |
| 5 | Katarzyna Niewiadoma-Phinney (POL) | Canyon//SRAM Zondacrypto | + 22" |
| 6 | Demi Vollering (NED) | FDJ–Suez | + 25" |
| 7 | Anna van der Breggen (NED) | Team SD Worx–Protime | + 27" |
| 8 | Puck Pieterse (NED) | Fenix–Deceuninck | + 27" |
| 9 | Niamh Fisher-Black (NZL) | Lidl–Trek | + 31" |
| 10 | Chloé Dygert (USA) | Canyon//SRAM Zondacrypto | + 31" |

== Stage 5 ==
30 July 2025 – Chasseneuil-du-Poitou (Futuroscope) to Guéret, 165.8 km (103.0 mi)

The fifth stage from Chasseneuil-du-Poitou (Futuroscope) to Guéret was the longest stage of the race at 165.8 kilometres (103.0 mi), heading eastwards towards the Alps. The medium mountain stage included three categorised climbs (one third-category and two fourth-category), all taking place in the last 30 km (19 mi). The final climb of the stage – the third-category Le Maupuy (2.8km with an average gradient of 5.4%) – was located just 6.8 km (4.2 mi) from the finish in Guéret, with bonus seconds available on the climb.

The start of the stage featured a long fight to get into the break. Elena Cecchini (Team SD Worx–Protime) was able to get a lead of almost a minute at one point but she quickly brought back by the peloton. During the breakaway formation phase, there were a few crashes in the peloton which caused a number of riders to abandon the race. Eventually, with around 100 kilometres (62 mi) to go, Jackson, Soto, Anneke Dijkstra (VolkerWessels Cycling Team), and Francesca Barale (Team Picnic–PostNL) were able to form the break of the day. A few minutes later, Brodie Chapman (UAE Team ADQ) bridged from the peloton to the break, making it five riders out front. Their maximum advantage reached just under five minutes before being gradually reeled back in. At the intermediate sprint with 39 kilometres (24 mi) left, the break's lead was just around two minutes over the peloton, where Wiebes outsprinted Vos to further increase her lead in the points classification. Heading towards the first categorized climb, Soto and Dijkstra were dropped from the break.

On the second climb of the day, the Côte du Peyroux, Chapman accelerated out front, dropping Jackson and Barale while in the peloton, there was also an increase in pace which dropped Wiebes. As the peloton began to close in on Chapman on the descent, Squiban, Shirin van Anrooij (Lidl–Trek), Silke Smulders (Liv AlUla Jayco), and Dilyxine Miermont (Ceratizit Pro Cycling) launched a counterattack to join Chapman in front. However, they were eventually caught at the foot of the final climb to Le Maupuy. Midway up the climb, Le Court, Ferrand-Prévot, and Niewiadoma took six, four, and two bonus seconds, respectively. Immediately afterwards, Vollering lifted the pace, pulling the quartet clear before being joined other GC contenders including Anna van der Breggen (Team SD Worx–Protime), Pauliena Rooijakkers (Fenix–Premier Tech), and Sarah Gigante (AG Insurance–Soudal). Vos tried to bridge to the front group but she was unsuccessful. On the descent, Gigante was briefly dropped but she was able to come back to the front to set up her teammate, Le Court, for the stage. Van der Breggen attempted an attack inside the final kilometre but she was not able to get a gap. In the final few hundred metres, Le Court launched her sprint first before holding off Vollering and van der Breggen to win the stage, reclaiming the yellow jersey in the process. Vos led the chase group across the line in eighth place, 33 seconds down on the front group. Wiebes and Chabbey maintained their leads in the points and QoM classifications.

Stage 5 Result
| Rank | Rider | Team | Time |
|---|---|---|---|
| 1 | Kimberley Le Court (MRI) | AG Insurance–Soudal | 3h 54' 07" |
| 2 | Demi Vollering (NED) | FDJ–Suez | + 0" |
| 3 | Anna van der Breggen (NED) | Team SD Worx–Protime | + 0" |
| 4 | Katarzyna Niewiadoma-Phinney (POL) | Canyon//SRAM Zondacrypto | + 0" |
| 5 | Pauline Ferrand-Prévot (FRA) | Visma–Lease a Bike | + 0" |
| 6 | Sarah Gigante (AUS) | AG Insurance–Soudal | + 0" |
| 7 | Pauliena Rooijakkers (NED) | Fenix–Deceuninck | + 0" |
| 8 | Marianne Vos (NED) | Visma–Lease a Bike | + 33" |
| 9 | Évita Muzic (FRA) | FDJ–Suez | + 33" |
| 10 | Elise Chabbey (SUI) | FDJ–Suez | + 33" |

General classification after Stage 5
| Rank | Rider | Team | Time |
|---|---|---|---|
| 1 | Kimberley Le Court (MRI) | AG Insurance–Soudal | 15h 07' 14" |
| 2 | Pauline Ferrand-Prévot (FRA) | Visma–Lease a Bike | + 18" |
| 3 | Demi Vollering (NED) | FDJ–Suez | + 23" |
| 4 | Katarzyna Niewiadoma-Phinney (POL) | Canyon//SRAM Zondacrypto | + 24" |
| 5 | Anna van der Breggen (NED) | Team SD Worx–Protime | + 27" |
| 6 | Marianne Vos (NED) | Visma–Lease a Bike | + 37" |
| 7 | Pauliena Rooijakkers (NED) | Fenix–Deceuninck | + 45" |
| 8 | Sarah Gigante (AUS) | AG Insurance–Soudal | + 55" |
| 9 | Puck Pieterse (NED) | Fenix–Deceuninck | + 1' 04" |
| 10 | Cédrine Kerbaol (FRA) | EF Education–Oatly | + 1' 16" |

== Stage 6 ==
31 July 2025 – Clermont-Ferrand to Ambert, 123.7 km (76.9 mi)

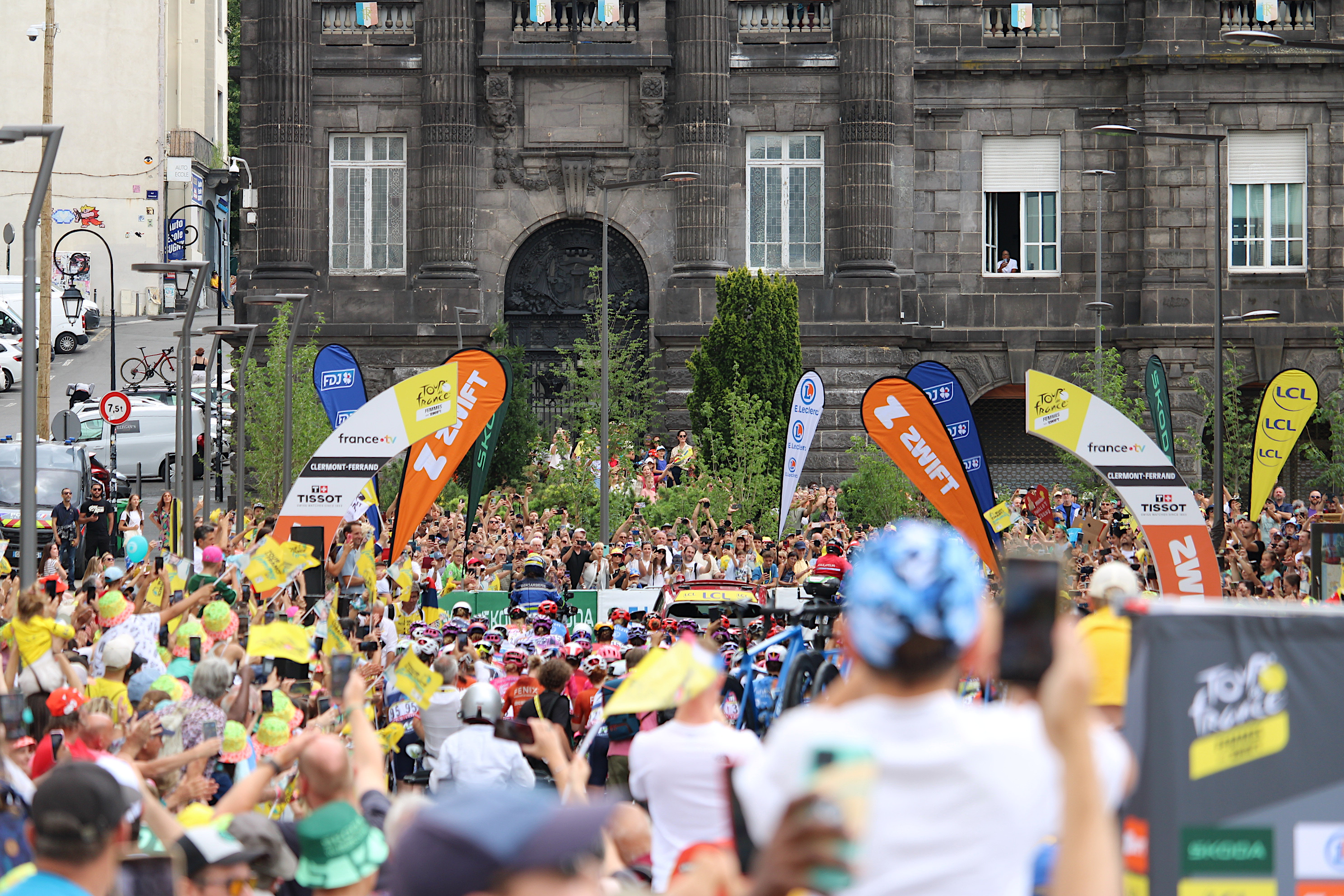
The start of the stage in Clermont-Ferrand

The sixth stage of the race took the riders eastwards on a 123.7-kilometre (76.9 mi) mountainous course from Clermont-Ferrand to Ambert in the Massif Central. With a total of 2,350 m (7,710 ft) of elevation gain, the stage had four categorised climbs (one first-category, one second-category and two third-category), with the hardest climb being the first-category Col du Béal (10.2 km with an average gradient of 5.6%). Bonus seconds were available at the top of the uncategorised climb of Valcivières, which topped with 12.1 kilometres (7.5 mi) left.

Ahead of the intermediate sprint after 30.1 kilometres (18.7 mi) of racing, Chabbey was able to establish herself in front of the race before taking maximum points at the sprint. She was soon joined by 19 other riders to make it a 20-woman break in front. On the first two categorized climbs, Chabbey took a first and second place while the break was reduced to 12 riders. The peloton allowed the break an advantage of only a minute before reaching the foot of the first-category Col du Béal. AG Insurance–Soudal took up most of the pacemaking in the peloton on the climb, setting a steady tempo to reduce the break's advantage to just under half a minute. At the top, Chabbey took maximum points to further extend her lead in the QoM classification. On the descent, Chabbey and Smulders went clear of the rest of the break but soon after, only Chabbey was left in front. She was eventually caught on the final categorized climb, the Col du Chansert.

Midway up the climb, Squiban went on the attack. She gradually extended her advantage as the peloton continued to set a steady tempo. At the top, she held a lead of a minute over the Chabbey-led peloton. Squiban maintained her advantage on the descent and the uncategorized climb of Valcivières, taking the six bonus seconds in the process. In the peloton, Le Court and Niewiadoma sprinted for four and two bonus seconds, respectively. On the descent, Juliette Labous (FDJ–Suez) attacked from the peloton but Squiban maintained a one-minute advantage to win the stage. Labous stayed clear of the peloton to take second place while Le Court took the final bonus seconds available. In the GC, Le Court extended her advantage to 26 seconds over Ferrand-Prévot. Vos dropped out of the top ten after getting dropped on Col du Béal.

Stage 6 Result
| Rank | Rider | Team | Time |
|---|---|---|---|
| 1 | Maëva Squiban (FRA) | UAE Team ADQ | 3h 20' 46" |
| 2 | Juliette Labous (FRA) | FDJ–Suez | + 1' 09" |
| 3 | Kimberley Le Court (MRI) | AG Insurance–Soudal | + 1' 13" |
| 4 | Demi Vollering (NED) | FDJ–Suez | + 1' 13" |
| 5 | Dominika Włodarczyk (POL) | UAE Team ADQ | + 1' 13" |
| 6 | Margot Vanpachtenbeke (BEL) | VolkerWessels Cycling Team | + 1' 13" |
| 7 | Pauline Ferrand-Prévot (FRA) | Visma–Lease a Bike | + 1' 13" |
| 8 | Magdeleine Vallieres (CAN) | EF Education–Oatly | + 1' 13" |
| 9 | Pauliena Rooijakkers (NED) | Fenix–Deceuninck | + 1' 13" |
| 10 | Puck Pieterse (NED) | Fenix–Deceuninck | + 1' 13" |

General classification after Stage 6
| Rank | Rider | Team | Time |
|---|---|---|---|
| 1 | Kimberley Le Court (MRI) | AG Insurance–Soudal | 18h 29' 05" |
| 2 | Pauline Ferrand-Prévot (FRA) | Visma–Lease a Bike | + 26" |
| 3 | Katarzyna Niewiadoma-Phinney (POL) | Canyon//SRAM Zondacrypto | + 30" |
| 4 | Demi Vollering (NED) | FDJ–Suez | + 31" |
| 5 | Anna van der Breggen (NED) | Team SD Worx–Protime | + 35" |
| 6 | Pauliena Rooijakkers (NED) | Fenix–Deceuninck | + 53" |
| 7 | Sarah Gigante (AUS) | AG Insurance–Soudal | + 1' 03" |
| 8 | Puck Pieterse (NED) | Fenix–Deceuninck | + 1' 12" |
| 9 | Cédrine Kerbaol (FRA) | EF Education–Oatly | + 1' 24" |
| 10 | Évita Muzic (FRA) | FDJ–Suez | + 1' 24" |

== Stage 7 ==
1 August 2025 – Bourg-en-Bresse to Chambéry, 159.7 km (99.2 mi)

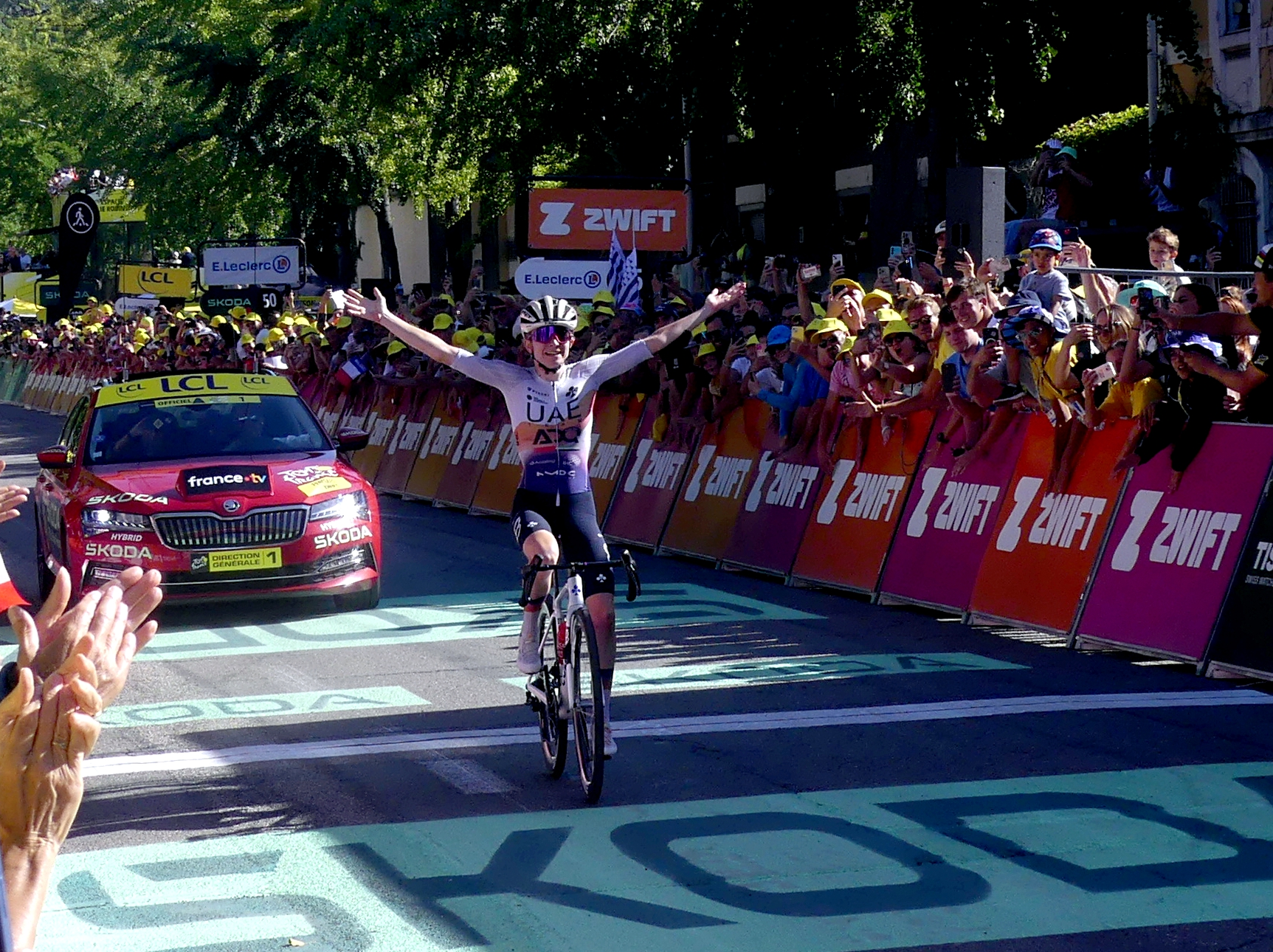
Stage winner Maëva Squiban crossing the finish line

The seventh stage of the race headed further eastwards towards the French Alps on a hilly 159.7-kilometre (99.2 mi) course from Bourg-en-Bresse to Chambéry. The stage had three categorised climbs (two second-category and one fourth-category), with the second-category climb of Col du Granier (8.9 km with an average gradient of 5.4%) leading to a "fast and technical" descent to the finish in Chambéry.

The fight to get into the break took over 20 kilometres (12 mi) before a group of 17 riders, including the previous day's winner, Squiban, were able to get a significant gap. Heading to the first climb of the day, the Côte de Saint-Franc, their lead gradually rose to over four minutes over the peloton. At the top of the climb with just under 48 kilometres (30 mi) left, the break was reduced to just nine riders while their advantage increased to more than five minutes. A few riders came back on the descent ahead of the second climb, the Côte de Berland. After the breakaway riders reached the top of the climb, they stopped working together. Meanwhile, Fenix–Deceuninck began to lift the pace in the peloton. As a result, the break's advantage went down to just under two minutes before the riders reached the foot of the Col du Granier.

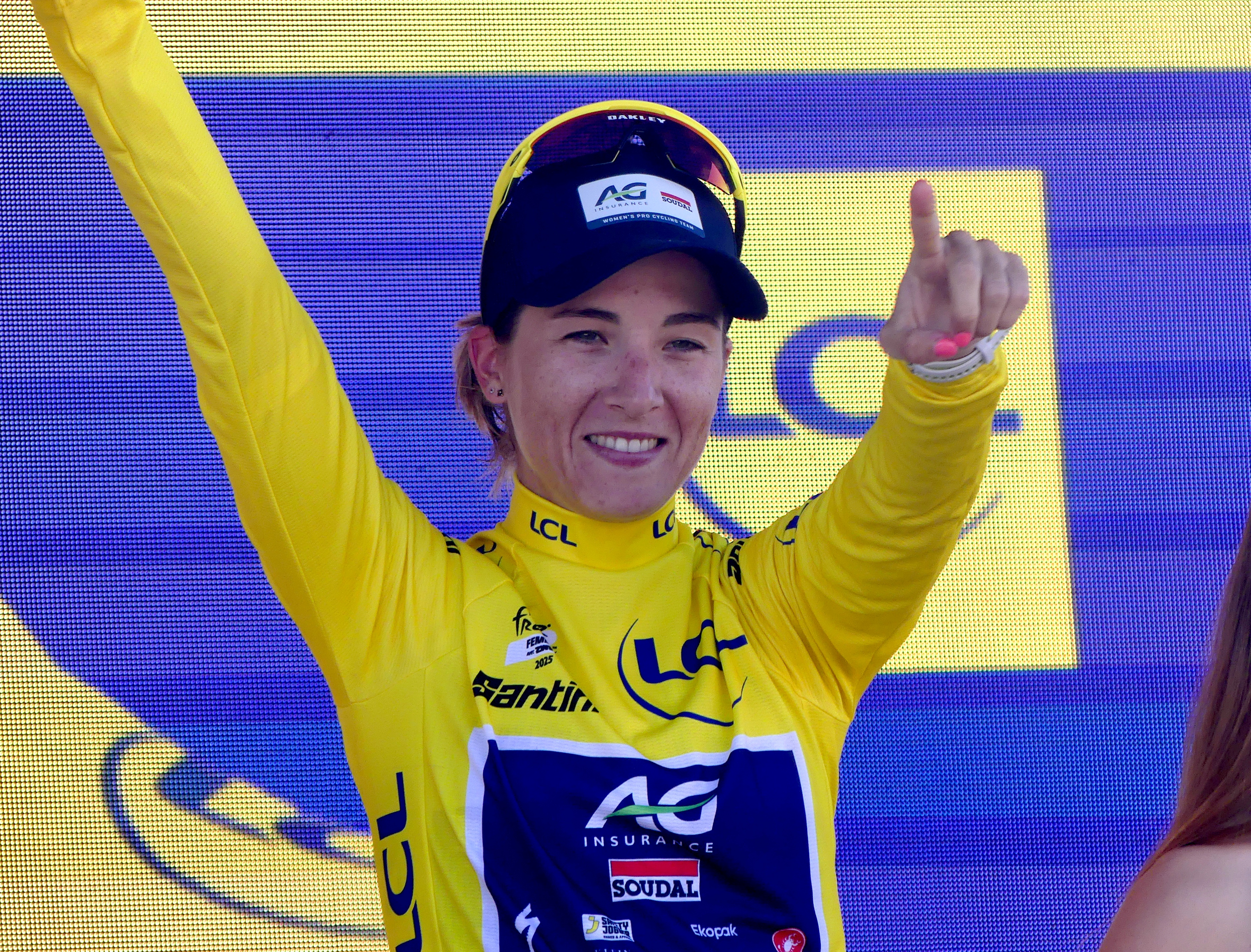
Le Court remained in the yellow jersey

Just before the climb, Rijnbeek attacked from the break, building a small lead at the foot of the climb. She was soon joined by Mareille Meijering (Movistar Team) and Ruth Edwards (Human Powered Health), who both subsequently dropped Rijnbeek. After a few kilometres, Squiban, van Anrooij, and Chloé Dygert (Canyon//SRAM Zondacrypto) bridged to the duo up front, with the quintet still holding a lead of more than two minutes on the peloton. 4.2 kilometres (2.6 mi) from the top of the climb, Squiban accelerated, bringing only Meijering with her. She eventually dropped Meijering near the top, building a lead of a minute on her closest chasers. Meanwhile, in the peloton, Rooijakkers increased the pace, putting the yellow jersey of Le Court in trouble. The main group of GC contenders crossed the top at a minute and a half behind Squiban, with Le Court further behind by half a minute. On the descent to the finish, a few riders came back to the peloton, including Le Court and Cédrine Kerbaol (EF Education–Oatly), with the latter proceeding to get a gap on the descent. Kerbaol caught the remnants of the break with the exception of Squiban, who soloed to her second successive stage win to the delight of the French crowds. The main GC contenders finished together with the exception of Gigante, Rooijakkers, and Évita Muzic (FDJ–Suez), who lost 11 seconds on the descent.

In the GC, Le Court kept her 26 second advantage over Ferrand-Prévot. Kerbaol moved up to seventh overall after gaining 9 seconds on the road and 6 bonus seconds. Puck Pieterse (Fenix–Deceuninck) dropped out of the top ten after crashing on the descent of Granier and losing almost a minute and a half. Nienke Vinke (Team Picnic–PostNL) took the lead in the young rider classification, with a 21 second lead over Bego.

Following the stage, Squiban stated that she joked about attacking at the start of the stage, but "in the end it wasn’t a joke”.

Stage 7 Result
| Rank | Rider | Team | Time |
|---|---|---|---|
| 1 | Maëva Squiban (FRA) | UAE Team ADQ | 3h 58' 26" |
| 2 | Cédrine Kerbaol (FRA) | EF Education–Oatly | + 51" |
| 3 | Ruth Edwards (USA) | Human Powered Health | + 51" |
| 4 | Shirin van Anrooij (NED) | Lidl–Trek | + 53" |
| 5 | Dominika Włodarczyk (POL) | UAE Team ADQ | + 1' 00" |
| 6 | Kimberley Le Court (MRI) | AG Insurance–Soudal | + 1' 00" |
| 7 | Anna van der Breggen (NED) | Team SD Worx–Protime | + 1' 00" |
| 8 | Demi Vollering (NED) | FDJ–Suez | + 1' 00" |
| 9 | Katarzyna Niewiadoma-Phinney (POL) | Canyon//SRAM Zondacrypto | + 1' 00" |
| 10 | Niamh Fisher-Black (NZL) | Lidl–Trek | + 1' 00" |

General classification after Stage 7
| Rank | Rider | Team | Time |
|---|---|---|---|
| 1 | Kimberley Le Court (MRI) | AG Insurance–Soudal | 22h 28' 31" |
| 2 | Pauline Ferrand-Prévot (FRA) | Visma–Lease a Bike | + 26" |
| 3 | Katarzyna Niewiadoma-Phinney (POL) | Canyon//SRAM Zondacrypto | + 30" |
| 4 | Demi Vollering (NED) | FDJ–Suez | + 31" |
| 5 | Anna van der Breggen (NED) | Team SD Worx–Protime | + 35" |
| 6 | Pauliena Rooijakkers (NED) | Fenix–Deceuninck | + 1' 04" |
| 7 | Cédrine Kerbaol (FRA) | EF Education–Oatly | + 1' 09" |
| 8 | Sarah Gigante (AUS) | AG Insurance–Soudal | + 1' 14" |
| 9 | Évita Muzic (FRA) | FDJ–Suez | + 1' 35" |
| 10 | Juliette Labous (FRA) | FDJ–Suez | + 1' 35" |

== Stage 8 ==
2 August 2025 – Chambéry to Saint-François-Longchamp (Col de la Madeleine), 111.9 km (69.5 mi)

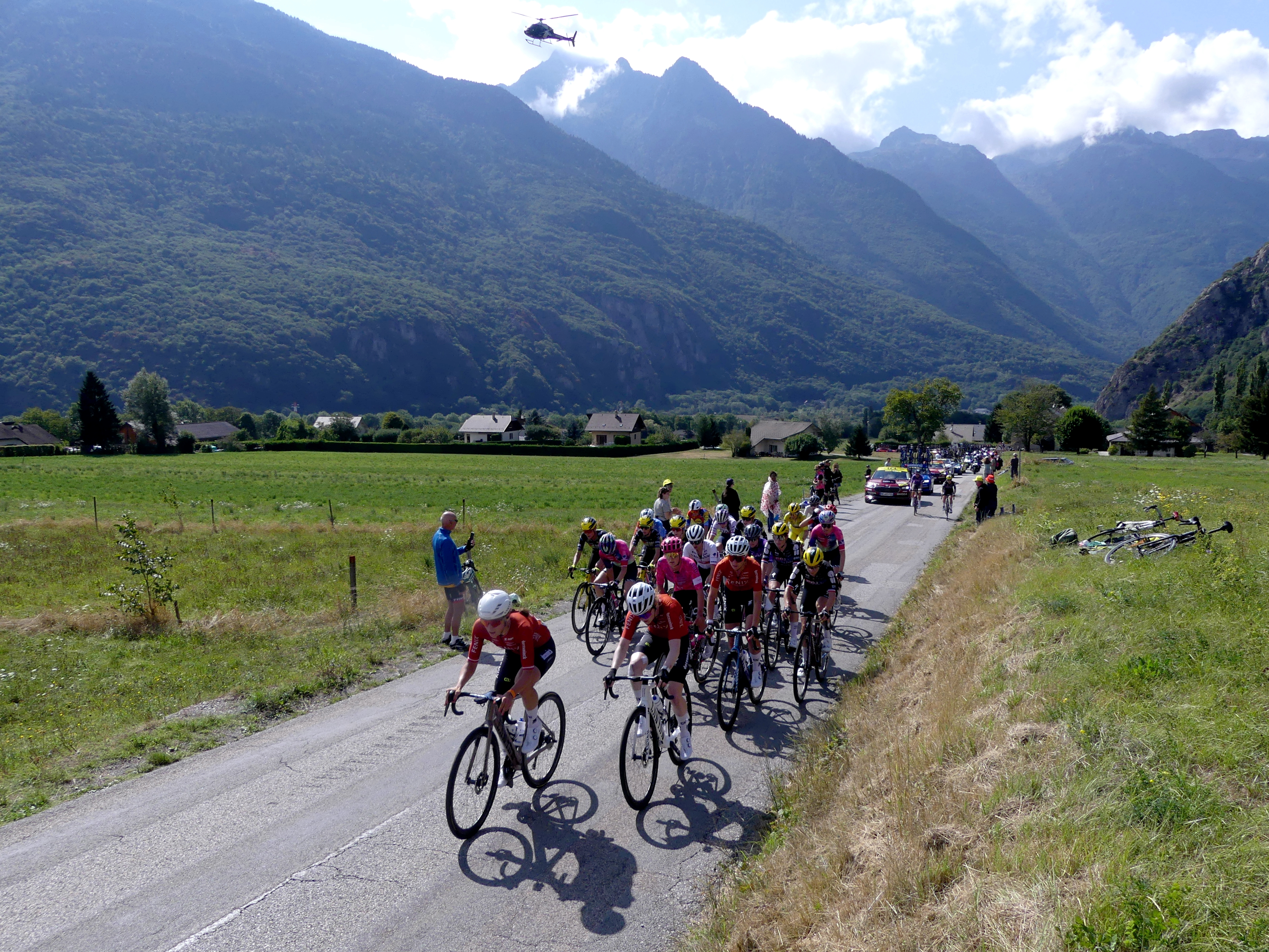
The "yellow jersey group" chasing the breakaway prior to the Col de la Madeleine

The eighth stage of the Tour was the queen stage of the race, a 111.9-kilometre (69.5 mi) stage in the French Alps from Chambéry to a summit finish at Col de la Madeleine.

With a total of 3,490 m (11,450 ft) of elevation gain, the riders tackled three categorised climbs – the first-category Col de Plainpalais (13.2km with an average gradient of 6.3%) at an elevation of 1,175 m (3,855 ft), the second-category Côte de Saint-Georges-d'Hurtières (4.8km with an average gradient of 5.9%), and finally a summit finish at the hors catégorie Col de la Madeleine (18.6km with an average gradient of 8.1%) at an elevation of 2,000 m (6,600 ft). The Col de la Madeleine has been tackled by the women's professional peloton previously, including twice during the 2002 Grande Boucle Féminine Internationale.

Immediately from the get-go, the riders climbed up the Col de Plainpalais. Several moves were attempted on the climb, with the yellow jersey of Le Court being involved a few times before a group of 14 riders went off the front. The group included Muzic, who was in the top ten overall before the start of the day. They were soon joined by Squiban, the stage winner from the previous two days, to make it 15 riders out front. The peloton kept the break on a tight leash of around half a minute until the top, where Chabbey took maximum QoM points to extend her lead in the mountains classification. On the descent and the ensuing valley, the peloton gradually let the gap go out to four minutes. As the peloton descended off an uncategorized climb, Le Court crashed on a hairpin bend. She was not seriously hurt and was able to quickly remount on her bike. There were splits in the peloton on the descent, with Gigante getting caught out, but the pace eased off once Gigante got back. This also allowed Le Court to rejoin the peloton. As the peloton descended the second categorized climb, the Côte de Saint-Georges-d'Hurtières, Gigante, Le Court, and Ferrand-Prévot were caught out but they were soon able to rejoin the peloton. As the riders approached the foot of Col de la Madeleine, Canyon//SRAM Zondacrypto lifted the pace in the peloton, reducing the break's lead to just under two minutes before the start of the climb.

From the foot of the climb, the break splintered into pieces until only Niamh Fisher-Black (Lidl–Trek) and Yara Kastelijn (Fenix–Deceuninck) were left in front. In the peloton, Fenix–Deceuninck initially set the pace before Le Court came to the front to set-up Gigante. The first major GC contender in trouble was van der Breggen, who dropped with around 15 kilometres (9.3 mi) still to climb. Le Court continued to set the pace until Gigante attacked with 11 kilometres (6.8 mi) left. Rooijakkers and Niewiadoma attempted to go with her but they eventually had to let the Australian's wheel go while Vollering was unable to respond. The only rider able to stay with Gigante was Ferrand-Prévot, who gradually made her way to Gigante's wheel. They both had satellite riders in the break in Justine Ghekiere (AG Insurance–Soudal) and Marion Bunel (Visma–Lease a Bike), bridging up to them at separate times. With 8.3 kilometres (5.2 mi) to go, Ferrand-Prévot made her decisive move, dropping Gigante and making her way to Fisher-Black and Kastelijn. She joined the lead duo with 7.1 kilometres (4.4 mi) left before eventually riding them off her wheel. Ferrand-Prévot gradually extended her advantage to the top, soloing to the stage win and the yellow jersey. Gigante overtook Fisher-Black and Kastelijn to finish second at almost two minutes down. Behind them, a five-woman group of Vollering, Niewiadoma, Rooijakkers, Kerbaol, and Dominika Włodarczyk (UAE Team ADQ) was formed. Vollering dropped the rest of the group inside the final kilometre, finishing at more than three minutes down on Ferrand-Prévot. The rest of the group finished in dribs and drabs while Le Court and van der Breggen finished more than nine minutes down.

In the GC, Ferrand-Prévot's advantage over Gigante in second was around two and a half minutes. Vollering occupied the last podium spot, 41 seconds behind Gigante and more than three minutes behind Ferrand-Prévot. Niewiadoma sat in fourth at just 22 seconds behind Vollering. Fisher-Black, who held on for third on the stage, moved into the top ten at eighth overall. Chabbey and Wiebes maintained their leads in the QoM and points classifications, and Vinke extended her lead in the young rider classification to nearly nine minutes ahead of Bego.

Following the stage, Ferrand-Prévot thanked the public and family at the roadside, and stated she'd "realised a little girl’s dream, it’s a perfect day”.

Stage 8 Result
| Rank | Rider | Team | Time |
|---|---|---|---|
| 1 | Pauline Ferrand-Prévot (FRA) | Visma–Lease a Bike | 3h 47' 24" |
| 2 | Sarah Gigante (AUS) | AG Insurance–Soudal | + 1' 45" |
| 3 | Niamh Fisher-Black (NZL) | Lidl–Trek | + 2' 15" |
| 4 | Demi Vollering (NED) | FDJ–Suez | + 3' 03" |
| 5 | Yara Kastelijn (NED) | Fenix–Deceuninck | + 3' 03" |
| 6 | Cédrine Kerbaol (FRA) | EF Education–Oatly | + 3' 18" |
| 7 | Dominika Włodarczyk (POL) | UAE Team ADQ | + 3' 22" |
| 8 | Katarzyna Niewiadoma-Phinney (POL) | Canyon//SRAM Zondacrypto | + 3' 26" |
| 9 | Pauliena Rooijakkers (NED) | Fenix–Deceuninck | + 3' 38" |
| 10 | Marion Bunel (FRA) | Visma–Lease a Bike | + 4' 31" |

General classification after Stage 8
| Rank | Rider | Team | Time |
|---|---|---|---|
| 1 | Pauline Ferrand-Prévot (FRA) | Visma–Lease a Bike | 26h 16' 11" |
| 2 | Sarah Gigante (AUS) | AG Insurance–Soudal | + 2' 37" |
| 3 | Demi Vollering (NED) | FDJ–Suez | + 3' 18" |
| 4 | Katarzyna Niewiadoma-Phinney (POL) | Canyon//SRAM Zondacrypto | + 3' 40" |
| 5 | Cédrine Kerbaol (FRA) | EF Education–Oatly | + 4' 11" |
| 6 | Pauliena Rooijakkers (NED) | Fenix–Deceuninck | + 4' 26" |
| 7 | Dominika Włodarczyk (POL) | UAE Team ADQ | + 5' 02" |
| 8 | Niamh Fisher-Black (NZL) | Lidl–Trek | + 5' 52" |
| 9 | Évita Muzic (FRA) | FDJ–Suez | + 5' 58" |
| 10 | Juliette Labous (FRA) | FDJ–Suez | + 7' 14" |

== Stage 9 ==
3 August 2025 – Praz-sur-Arly to Châtel, 124.1 km (77.1 mi)

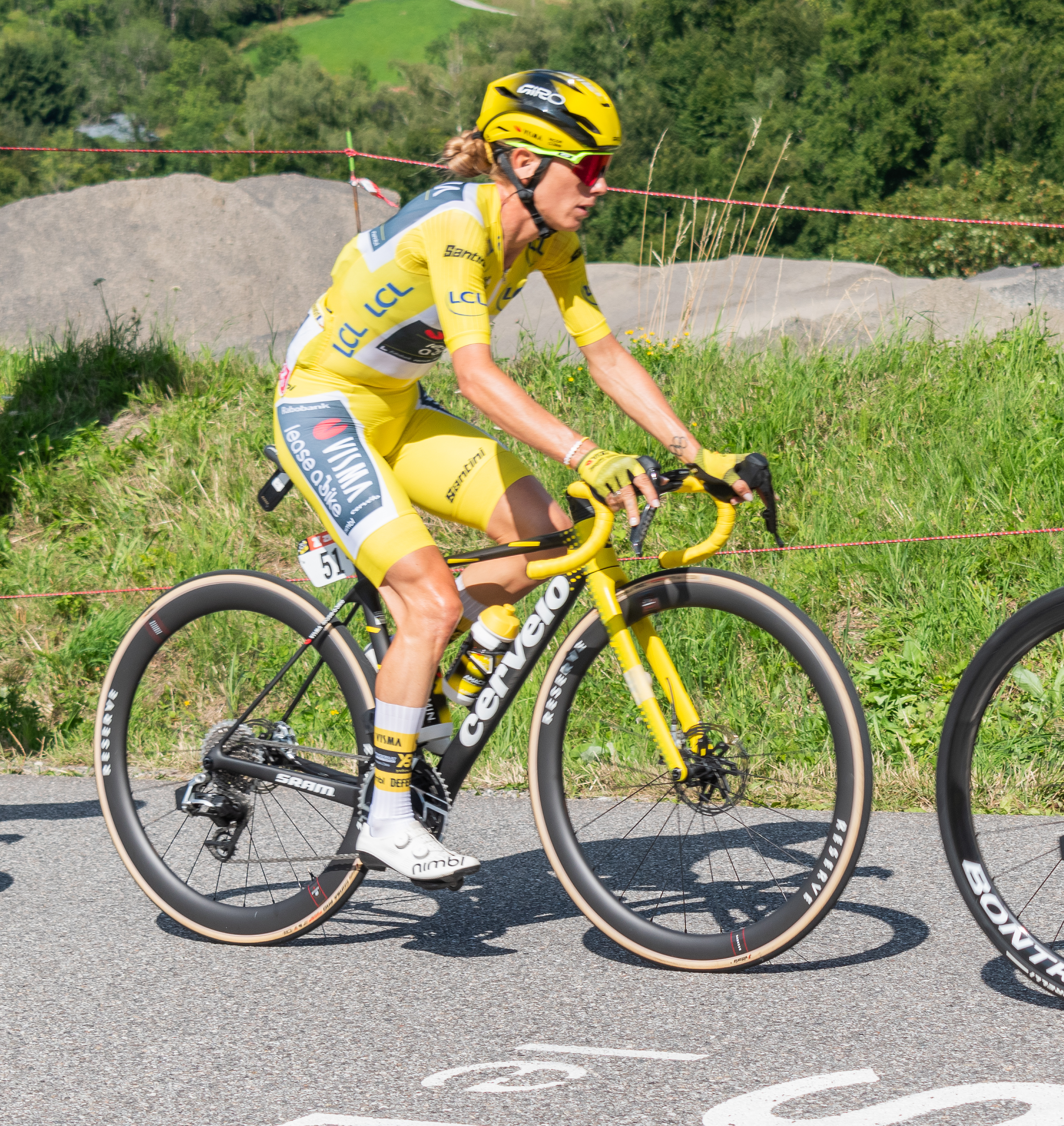
Pauline Ferrand-Prévot in the yellow jersey on stage 9

The final stage of the Tour remained in the Alps, a 124.1 km (77.1 mi) stage from Praz-sur-Arly to the ski resort of Châtel.

With a total of 2,880 m (9,450 ft) of elevation gain, riders tackled three categorised climbs – the first-category Côte d'Arâches-la-Frasse (6.2 km with an average gradient of 7.1%), the hors catégorie Col de Joux Plane (11.6 km with an average gradient of 5.5 %) at an elevation of 1,691 m (5,548 ft) and the first-category Col du Corbier (5.9 km with an average gradient of 8.5%). After an uphill drag over 20 kilometres (12 mi), the stage finished at the ski resort of Châtel at an elevation of 1,297 m (4,255 ft).

At the start of the stage, a four-woman group including van der Breggen was able to get a gap in front of the peloton. However, they were caught on the approach to the first climb, the Côte d'Arâches-la-Frasse, when the peloton sped up after the yellow jersey of Ferrand-Prévot and Gigante were caught behind a split on a descent. The yellow jersey group was able to rejoin ahead of the foot of the climb. The peloton was heavily reduced as the attacks started on the climb, with all of the main contenders in the front group. Eventually, van der Breggen launched another attack, going solo ahead of the peloton. Her lead grew to around two minutes as the riders approached the foot of Col de Joux Plane. Just before the climb, Kerbaol and Niewiadoma crashed. Niewiadoma was quickly able to remount and rejoin the peloton but Kerbaol was more than half a minute down on the yellow jersey group when she remounted. She was unable to rejoin the main GC group and would eventually lose more than nine minutes at the end of the day.

With 8.5 kilometres (5.3 mi) to the top, Gigante attacked, bringing the rest of main GC contenders with her with the exception of Rooijakkers, who was soon caught by Kerbaol's group, also losing nine minutes as a result. Vollering also launched a few moves towards the top of the climb but she was unable to get a gap. At the top, van der Breggen still led the race, leading by a minute over the yellow jersey group which was reduced to just Ferrand-Prévot, Gigante, Vollering, Niewiadoma, Włodarczyk, Fisher-Black, and Vollering's teammate, Labous. On the technical descent, Niewiadoma pushed the pace, distancing Gigante in the process. The group reached the bottom of the descent with a lead of almost a minute on Gigante, with Labous going to the front to increase their advantage over Gigante further. On the climb of Col du Corbier, they caught and dropped van der Breggen. There were no significant attacks towards the top of the climb as Labous continued to set the pace in the group.

On an uncategorized climb with 7 kilometres (4.3 mi) left, Vollering went on another attack but the move only distanced Labous and Włodarczyk. A few hundred metres later, Ferrand-Prévot launched her attack, immediately distancing the rest of the group. Fisher-Black tried to bridge up to her but she was unable to do so. Ferrand-Prévot gradually increased her advantage to the finish, soloing to her second consecutive stage win and confirming her Tour victory. Vollering finished second ahead of Niewiadoma, solidifying their places on the final podium after Gigante lost almost four minutes at the end of the day. With Gigante's time loss, Włodarczyk and Fisher-Black also moved into the top five overall. Labous' ride also moved her up to seventh place on GC. Wiebes, Chabbey, and Vinke finished safely to confirm their victories in the points, mountains, and young rider classifications, respectively. FDJ–Suez clinched the teams classification while Squiban was awarded the race's most combative rider.

Stage 9 Result
| Rank | Rider | Team | Time |
|---|---|---|---|
| 1 | Pauline Ferrand-Prévot (FRA) | Visma–Lease a Bike | 3h 28' 23" |
| 2 | Demi Vollering (NED) | FDJ–Suez | + 20" |
| 3 | Katarzyna Niewiadoma-Phinney (POL) | Canyon//SRAM Zondacrypto | + 23" |
| 4 | Niamh Fisher-Black (NZL) | Lidl–Trek | + 23" |
| 5 | Dominika Włodarczyk (POL) | UAE Team ADQ | + 33" |
| 6 | Juliette Labous (FRA) | FDJ–Suez | + 1' 49" |
| 7 | Sarah Gigante (AUS) | AG Insurance–Soudal | + 3' 53" |
| 8 | Cédrine Kerbaol (FRA) | EF Education–Oatly | + 9' 22" |
| 9 | Pauliena Rooijakkers (NED) | Fenix–Deceuninck | + 9' 23" |
| 10 | Nadia Gontova (CAN) | Winspace Orange Seal | + 9' 26" |

Final General classification
| Rank | Rider | Team | Time |
|---|---|---|---|
| 1 | Pauline Ferrand-Prévot (FRA) | Visma–Lease a Bike | 29h 54' 24" |
| 2 | Demi Vollering (NED) | FDJ–Suez | + 3' 42" |
| 3 | Katarzyna Niewiadoma-Phinney (POL) | Canyon//SRAM Zondacrypto | + 4' 09" |
| 4 | Dominika Włodarczyk (POL) | UAE Team ADQ | + 5' 45" |
| 5 | Niamh Fisher-Black (NZL) | Lidl–Trek | + 6' 25" |
| 6 | Sarah Gigante (AUS) | AG Insurance–Soudal | + 6' 40" |
| 7 | Juliette Labous (FRA) | FDJ–Suez | + 9' 13" |
| 8 | Cédrine Kerbaol (FRA) | EF Education–Oatly | + 13' 43" |
| 9 | Pauliena Rooijakkers (NED) | Fenix–Deceuninck | + 13' 59" |
| 10 | Évita Muzic (FRA) | FDJ–Suez | + 15' 50" |
