= 2025 Omloop Het Nieuwsblad (women's race) =

2025 UCI Women's World Tour, race 4 of 27
- Event poster with previous winners Jan Tratnik and Marianne Vos

Race details
- Dates: 1 March 2025
- Stages: 1
- Distance: 137.9 km (85.7 mi)
- Winning time: 3h 39' 43"

Results
	Winner	Lotte Claes (BEL)	(Arkéa–B&B Hotels Women)
	Second	Aurela Nerlo (POL)	(Winspace Orange Seal)
	Third	Demi Vollering (NED)	(FDJ–Suez)

The 2025 Omloop Het Nieuwsblad was the 20th edition of the Omloop Het Nieuwsblad road cycling one day race, which was held on 1 March 2025 as part of the 2025 UCI Women's World Tour calendar.

The race was won by Belgian rider Lotte Claes of Arkéa–B&B Hotels Women, after an early breakaway stayed away from the main field.

== Teams ==
Fifteen UCI Women's WorldTeams, six UCI Women's ProTeams, and three UCI Women's Continental Teams made up the twenty-four teams that participated in the race.

UCI Women's WorldTeams

- AG Insurance–Soudal
- Canyon//SRAM zondacrypto
- Ceratizit Pro Cycling
- FDJ–Suez
- Fenix–Deceuninck
- Human Powered Health
- Lidl–Trek
- Liv AlUla Jayco
- Movistar Team
- Roland
- Team Picnic–PostNL
- Team SD Worx–Protime
- UAE Team ADQ
- Uno-X Mobility
- Visma–Lease a Bike

UCI Women's ProTeams

- Arkéa–B&B Hotels Women
- Cofidis
- EF Education–Oatly
- St. Michel–Preference Home–Auber93
- VolkerWessels Women Cyclingteam
- Winspace Orange Seal

UCI Women's Continental Teams

- BePink–Imatra–Bongioanni
- DD Group Pro Cycling Team
- Lotto Ladies

== Result ==
Result
Rank	Rider	Team	Time
1	Lotte Claes (BEL)	Arkéa–B&B Hotels Women	3h 39' 43"
2	Aurela Nerlo (POL)	Winspace Orange Seal	+ 0"
3	Demi Vollering (NED)	FDJ–Suez	+ 3' 25"
4	Puck Pieterse (NED)	Fenix–Deceuninck	+ 3' 25"
5	Lorena Wiebes (NED)	Team SD Worx–Protime	+ 3' 35"
6	Eleonora Gasparrini (ITA)	UAE Team ADQ	+ 3' 35"
7	Pfeiffer Georgi (GBR)	Team Picnic–PostNL	+ 3' 35"
8	Clara Copponi (FRA)	Lidl–Trek	+ 3' 35"
9	Ilse Pluimers (NED)	AG Insurance–Soudal	+ 3' 35"
10	Margot Vanpachtenbeke (BEL)	VolkerWessels Women Cyclingteam	+ 3' 35"
