= Col de la Madeleine =

Mountain pass in the French Alps

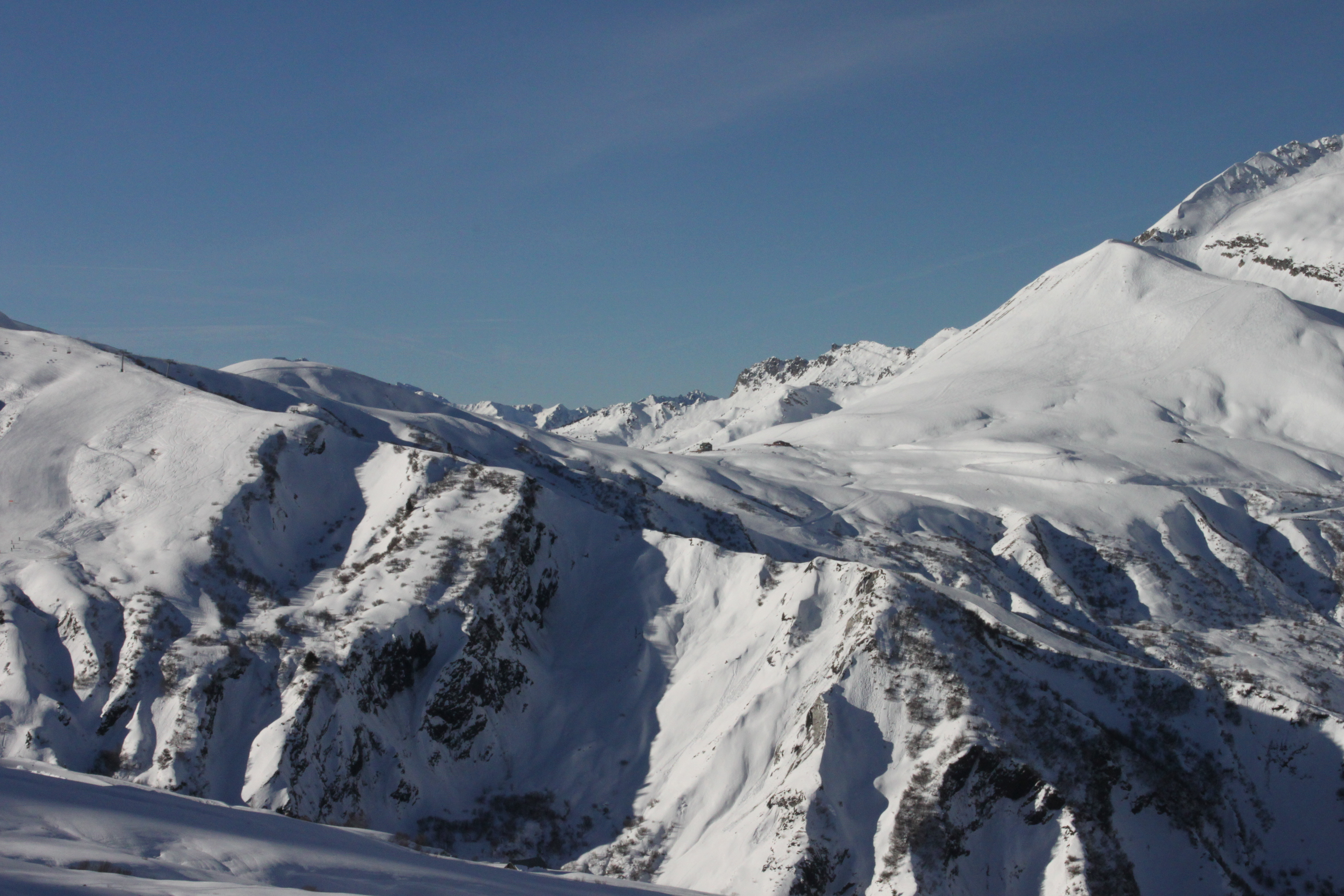
- North side of the Col de la Madeleine in January

- Location within Alps
- Elevation: 1,993 m (6,539 ft)
- Traversed by: D213

Third Approach
- Location: Savoie, France
- Range: Alps
- Coordinates: 45°26′05″N 6°22′32″E

Col de la Madeleine (el. 1,993 m.) is a high mountain pass in the Alps in the department of Savoie in France which connects La Chambre in Maurienne with La Léchère in Tarentaise. The pass is closed from November to the beginning of June.

== History ==
John Ball, in his 1863 A guide to the western Alps described the Col de la Madeleine thus:

This pass is traversed by a well-marked mule-path, much frequented by the country people, being the shortest way from the Maurienne to Tarentaise, but is rarely visited by foreigners.

Its altitude was given as 6,637 feet (2,023 m).

== Cycling ==
=== Details of the climb ===
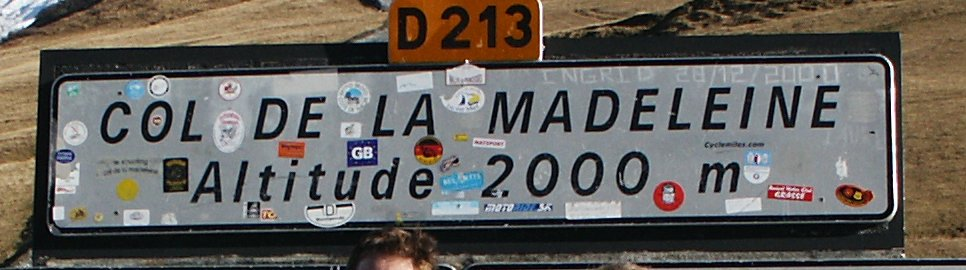
Sign at the pass

The southern approach from La Chambre (via the D213) is 19 km long, gaining 1,522 m at an average gradient of 8.01%, with a maximum of 13.5%.

The southern approach from La Chambre via Montgellafrey is 19.8 km long, gaining 1,520 m at an average gradient of 7.68%, with a maximum of 12.5%.

The northern approach can be accessed via Feissons-sur-Isère. From Feissons-sur-Isère (through La Léchère), the climb is 24.5 km. long, gaining 1,543 m at an average gradient of 6.3%, with a maximum of 12%. For the 2012 Tour de France, the height at the summit is shown as 2,000 m., whereas in previous years it has been shown as 1,993 m.

On both sides of the Col de la Madeleine mountain pass cycling milestones are placed every kilometre. They indicate the distance to the summit, the current height, and the average slope in the following kilometre. Such signposting for cyclists has become common in most major mountain passes in the French Pyrenees and Alps.

=== Appearances in Tour de France ===
The pass was first included in the Tour de France in 1969 and has since featured 28 times. For the 2012 Tour de France, the Col de la Madeleine was described as "beautiful, but heartbreaking" by The Daily Telegraph.

It has been ranked hors catégorie every year since 1995.

Year	Stage	Category	Start	Finish	Leader at the summit
2025	18	HC	Vif	Courchevel (Col de la Loze)	Jonas Vingegaard (DEN)
2020	17	HC	Grenoble	Méribel	Richard Carapaz (ECU)
2018	12	HC	Bourg-Saint-Maurice	Alpe d'Huez	Julian Alaphilippe (FRA)
2013	19	HC	Le Bourg-d'Oisans	Le Grand-Bornand	Pierre Rolland (FRA)
2012	11	HC	Albertville	La Toussuire-Les Sybelles	Peter Velits (SVK)
2010	9	HC	Morzine-Avoriaz	Saint-Jean-de-Maurienne	Anthony Charteau (FRA)
2005	11	HC	Courchevel	Briançon	Santiago Botero (COL)
2004	17	HC	Bourg d'Oisans	Le Grand-Bornand	Gilberto Simoni (ITA)
2002	16	HC	Les Deux Alpes	La Plagne	Michael Boogerd (NED)
2001	10	HC	Aix-les-Bains	Alpe d'Huez	Laurent Roux (FRA)
2000	15	HC	Briançon	Courchevel	Massimiliano Lelli (ITA)
1998	16	HC	Vizille	Albertville	Jan Ullrich (GER)
1997	14	HC	Le Bourg-d'Oisans	Courchevel	Richard Virenque (FRA)
1996	7	HC	Chambéry	Les Arcs	Richard Virenque (FRA)
1995	10	HC	La Plagne	Alpe d'Huez	Richard Virenque (FRA)
1994	17	1	Le Bourg-d'Oisans	Val Thorens	Piotr Ugrumov (LAT)
1990	11	HC	Saint-Gervais	Alpe d'Huez	Thierry Claveyrolat (FRA)
1988	12	1	Morzine	Alpe d'Huez	Henri Abadie (FRA)
1987	21	HC	Le Bourg-d'Oisans	La Plagne	Anselmo Fuerte (ESP)
1984	18	HC	Le Bourg-d'Oisans	La Plagne	Pedro Delgado (ESP)
1983	18	HC	Le Bourg-d'Oisans	Morzine	Lucien Van Impe (BEL)
1981	19	1	Morzine	Alpe d'Huez	Lucien Van Impe (BEL)
1980	17	HC	Serre-Chevalier	Morzine	Mariano Martínez (FRA)
1979	17	1	Les Menuires	Alpe d'Huez	Lucien Van Impe (BEL)
1977	17	1	Chamonix	Alpe d'Huez	André Chalmel (FRA)
1975	17	1	Valloire	Morzine-Avoriaz	Francisco Galdós (ESP)
1973	8	2	Moûtiers	Les Orres	Jean-Pierre Danguillaume (FRA)
1969	10	2	Chamonix	Briançon	Andrés Gandarias (ESP)

=== Appearances in Tour de France Femmes ===
Col de la Madeleine featured as the finish of Stage 8 of the 2025 Tour de France Femmes.

Year	Stage	Start of stage	Distance (km)	Category	Stage winner	Yellow jersey
2025	8	Chambéry	111.9	HC	Pauline Ferrand-Prévot (FRA)	Pauline Ferrand-Prévot (FRA)

== See also ==
- List of highest paved roads in Europe
- List of mountain passes
- Souvenir Henri Desgrange
