= Aurela Nerlo =

Polish cyclist (born 1998)

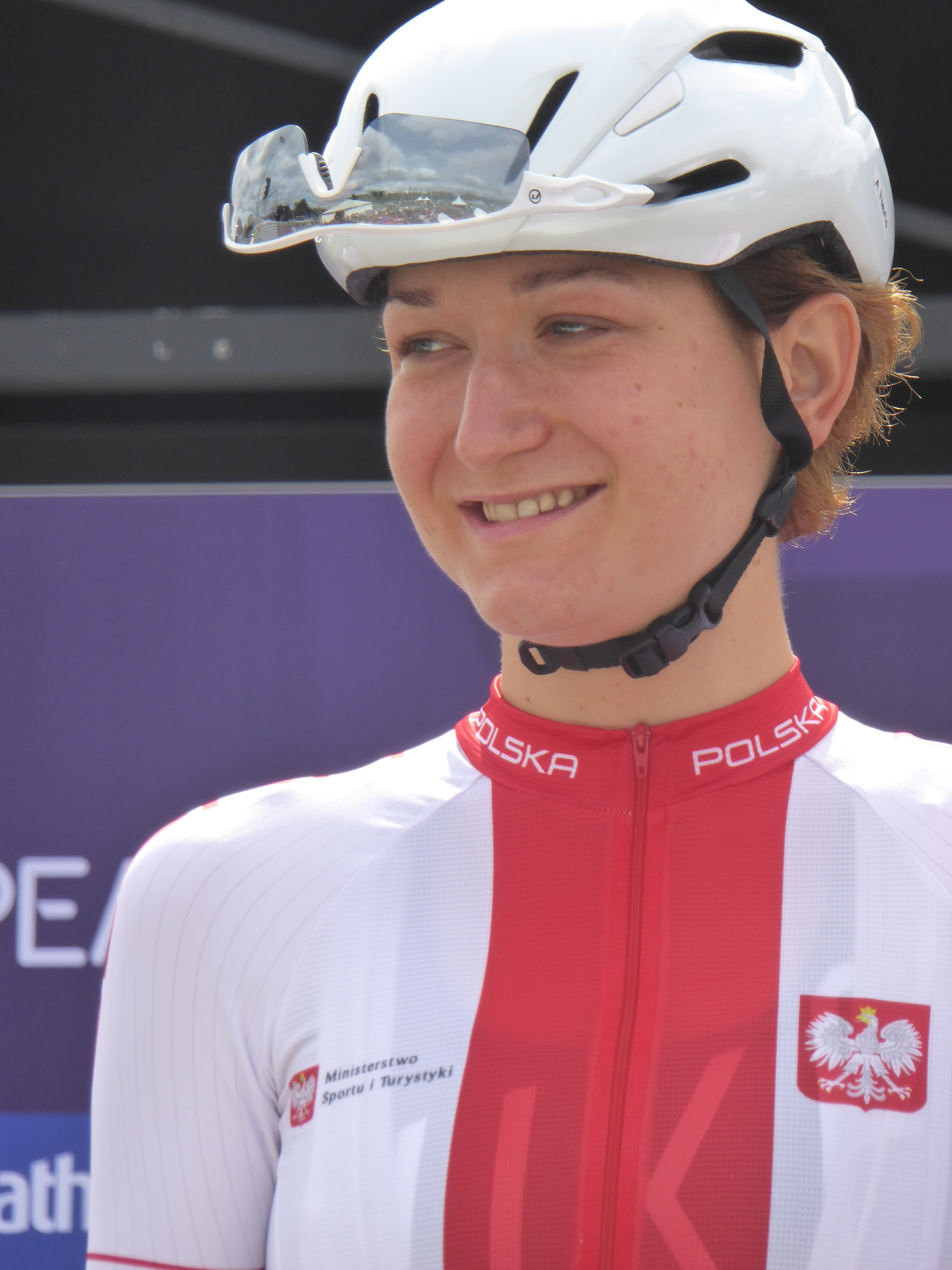
- Nerlo at the 2018 European Road Cycling Championships.

Personal information
- Full name: Aurela Nerlo
- Born: 11 February 1998 (age 28) Głogów, Poland

Cycling career
- Sport: Cycling
- Current team: Mayenne Monbana My Pie
- Discipline: Road
- Role: Rider
- Rider type: Time Triallist

Amateur teams
- 2017–2018: Mat Atom Deweloper
- 2019: TKK Pacific–Nestlé Fitness
- 2021: TKK Pacific–Nestlé Fitness

Professional teams
- 2020: CCC - Liv
- 2023: Massi - Tactic Women Team
- 2024–: Winspace

Aurela Nerlo (born 11 February 1998) is a Polish racing cyclist, who currently rides for Mayenne Monbana My Pie. She rode in the women's time trial event at the 2017 UCI Road World Championships, and took 4th place at the UEC European Under-23 Road Championships.

== Major results ==
2015
9th Time trial, National Junior Championships
2016
National Junior Championships

2nd Time trial
4th Road race

8th Road race, European Junior Championships
2017
8th SwissEver GP Cham-Hagendorn
9th Time trial, National Championships
2019
1st Time trial, National Under-23 Championships
2nd Overall Tour de Feminin – O cenu Českého Švýcarska

1st Young rider classification

National Championships

3rd Time trial
9th Road race

4th Time trial, European Under-23 Championships
2021
2nd Time trial, National Championships
6th Overall Giro della Toscana Int. Femminile – Memorial Michela Fanini
2022
4th Overall Giro della Toscana Int. Femminile – Memorial Michela Fanini
8th Time trial, National Championships
2023
5th Clásica de Almería
2024
National Championships

5th Time trial
10th Road race

7th Groupama Ladies Race Slovakia
9th Overall Tour de Pologne Women
2025
2nd Omloop Het Nieuwsblad
