= Margot Vanpachtenbeke =

Belgian cyclist (born 1999)

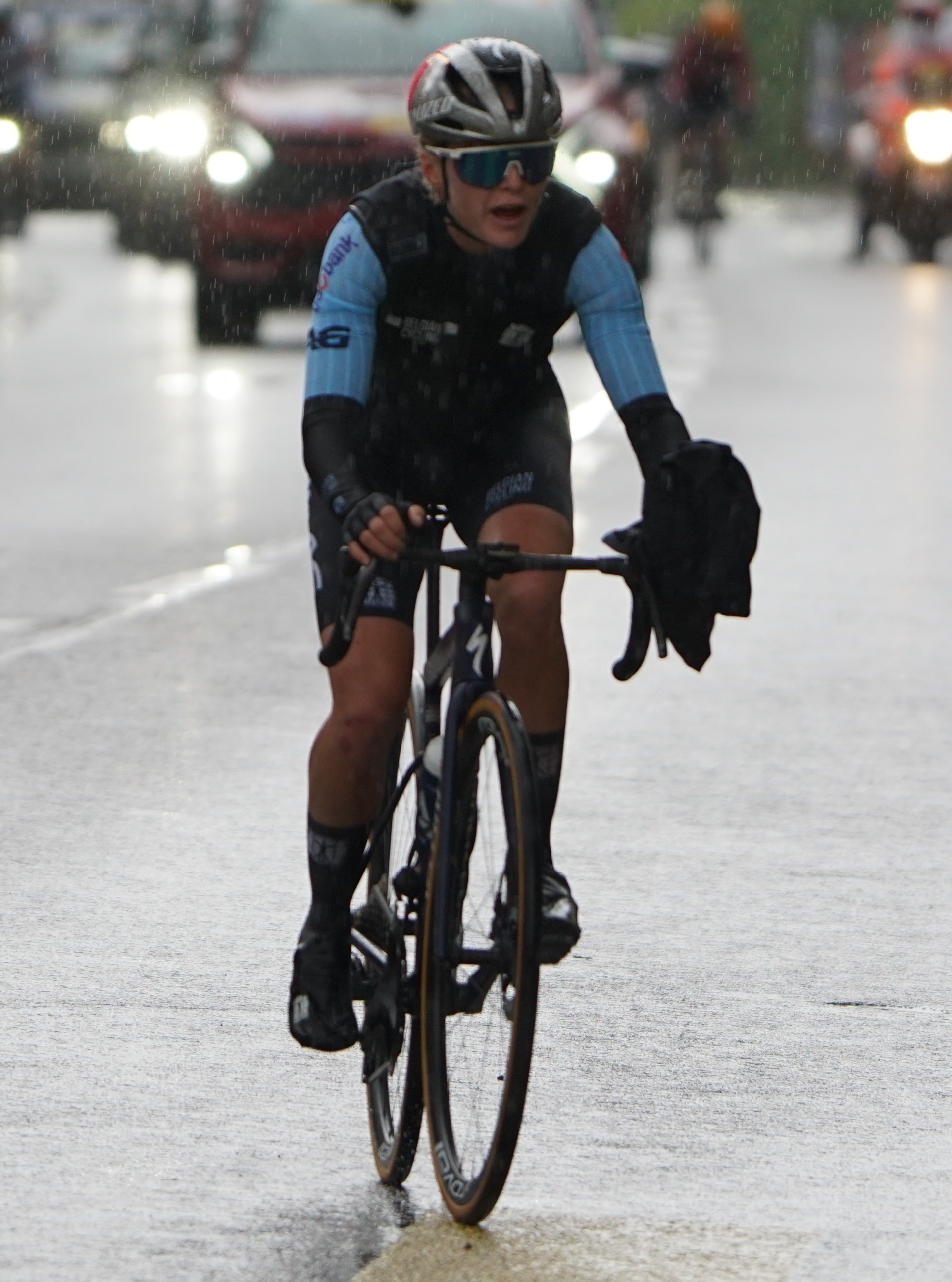
- Vanpachtenbeke during the 2024 World Championships in Zurich

Personal information
- Born: 2 February 1999 (age 27) Menen, Belgium

Cycling career
- Sport: Cycling
- Current team: Lidl–Trek
- Discipline: Road
- Role: Rider

Amateur team
- 2022: KDM-Pack Cycling Team

Professional teams
- 2023–2025: Parkhotel Valkenburg
- 2026-: Lidl–Trek

Margot Vanpachtenbeke (born 2 February 1999) is a Belgian racing cyclist, who currently rides for UCI Women's WorldTeam Lidl–Trek.

In June 2024, she took her first pro win on the opening stage of the Thüringen Ladies Tour. The following month, she was selected to compete in the road race at the Summer Olympics, where she placed 43rd.

== Major results ==
2022
6th Dwars door het Hageland
2023
7th Brabantse Pijl
2024 (3 pro wins)
1st Stage 1 Thüringen Ladies Tour
1st Overall Giro della Toscana Int. Femminile – Memorial Michela Fanini

1st Stage 2

2nd La Périgord Ladies
6th Grand Prix de Wallonie
7th La Picto–Charentaise
8th Grand Prix Stuttgart & Region
9th Binche–Chimay–Binche
10th Brabantse Pijl
2025
10th Omloop Het Nieuwsblad
