= Mayenne Monbana My Pie =

French cycling team

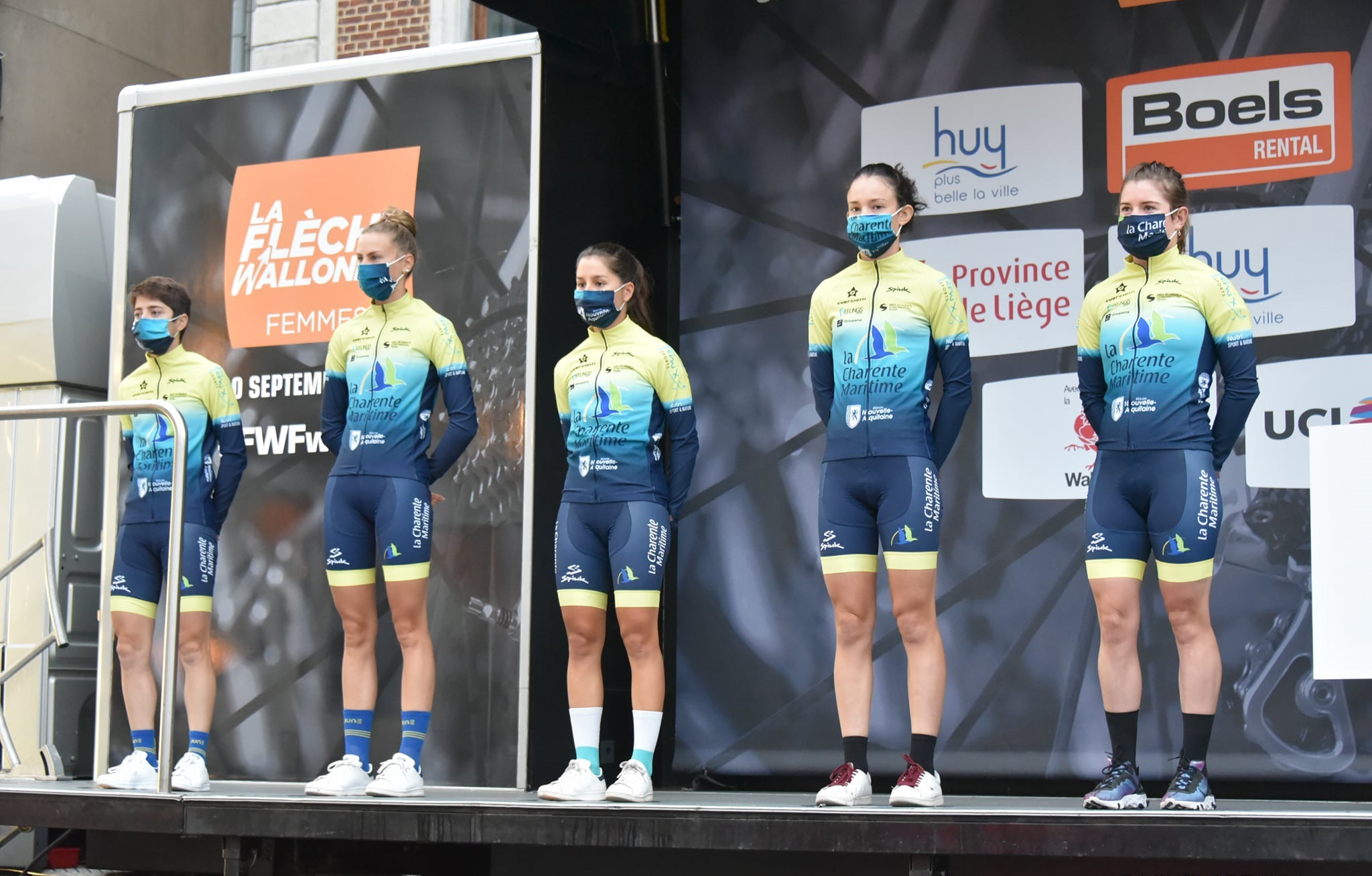

Team information
- UCI code: PCH (2015–2016); NAQ (2017–2018); CMW (2019–2020); SRC (2021–2023); WIN (2024); WOS (2025–)
- Registered: France
- Founded: 2015
- Status: National (2015–2018); UCI Women's Team (2019); UCI Women's Continental Team (2020–2024); UCI Women's ProTeam (2025–)
- Website: Team home page

Team name history
- 2015–2016 2017–2018 2019–2020 2021–2023 2024 2025 2026–: DN 17 Poitou-Charentes; DN 17 Nouvelle Aquitaine; Charente-Maritime Women Cycling; Stade Rochelais Charente-Maritime; Winspace; Winspace Orange Seal; Mayenne Monbana My Pie

Mayenne Monbana My Pie is a professional road bicycle racing women's team which participates in elite women's races. The team was established in 2015, becoming a UCI Women's Team for the 2019 season.

The team is sponsored by French local government department Mayenne, French chocolate company Monbana and French bakery My Pie.

== Team roster ==
As of 2 March 2025.

Rider	Date of birth
Marine Allione (FRA)	7 April 2001 (age 25)
Camille Fahy (FRA)	7 July 2003 (age 23)
Jenaya Francis (CAN)	8 September 2004 (age 21)
Nadia Gontova (CAN)	7 August 2000 (age 26)
Marie-Morgane le Deunff (FRA)	14 May 2002 (age 24)
Kiara Lylyk (CAN)	9 June 2004 (age 22)

Rider	Date of birth
Fiona Mangan (IRL)	16 May 1996 (age 30)
Aurela Nerlo (POL)	11 February 1998 (age 28)
Florence Normand (CAN)	5 January 2002 (age 24)
Karolina Perekitko (POL)	1 October 1998 (age 27)
Constance Valentin (FRA)	19 March 1998 (age 28)

== Major results ==
2019
La Picto-Charentaise, Gladys Verhulst

2023
Stage 2 Vuelta Extremadura Féminas, Maëva Squiban

== National Champions ==
2015
Portugal Time Trial, Daniela Reis
Portugal Road Race, Daniela Reis

2016
Portugal Time Trial, Daniela Reis
Portugal Road Race, Daniela Reis

2021
France Under-23 Road Race, India Grangier

2022
South Africa Road Race, Frances Janse van Rensburg
South Africa Under-23 Time Trial, Frances Janse van Rensburg

2023
South Africa Road Race, Frances Janse van Rensburg
South Africa Under-23 Time Trial, Frances Janse van Rensburg
