= 2026 in women's road cycling =

2026 in women's road cycling is about the 2026 women's bicycle races ruled by the UCI and the 2026 UCI Women's Teams.

== World Championships ==
The 2026 UCI Road World Championships will be held in Montreal, Canada. The 2026 FISU World University Cycling Championship was held in Chongli, China.

Race	Date	Cat. †	Winner	Second	Third	Ref
(China) World University Cycling Championship ITT	25 June 2026	WC	Danna Yiman (CHN)	Natalia Krześlak (POL)	Antonina Jackowiak (POL)	
(China) World University Cycling Championship Criterium	26 June 2026	WC	Lea Waldhoff (GER)	Karlijn Koops (NED)	Olivia Schoppe (GER)	
(China) World University Cycling Championship RR	27 June 2026	WC	Natalia Krześlak (POL)	Judith Krahl (GER)	Lena Gömmel (GER)	
(Canada) UCI Road World Championships ITT	20 September 2026	WC	Marlen Reusser (SUI)	Zoe Bäckstedt (GBR)	Franziska Koch (GER)	
(Canada) UCI Road World Championships ITT U23	21 September 2026	WC	Felicity Wilson-Haffenden (AUS)	Nienke Vinke (NED)	Luca Vierstraete (BEL)	
(Canada) UCI Road World Championships Mixed TTT	22 September 2026	WC	Italy (ITA); Vittoria Guazzini; Elisa Longo Borghini; Monica Trinca Colonel; Mattia Cattaneo; Filippo Ganna; Matteo Sobrero	France (FRA); Bruno Armirail; Rémi Cavagna; Jordan Labrosse; Juliette Berthet; Cédrine Kerbaol; Marion Borras	Switzerland (SUI); Stefan Bissegger; Stefan Küng; Jasmin Liechti; Marlen Reusser; Noemi Rüegg; Mauro Schmid	
(Canada) UCI Road World Championships ITT Juniors	22 September 2026	WC	Maria Okrucińska (POL)	Yana Decruyenaere (BEL)	Aalia Clay (GBR)	
(Canada) UCI Road World Championships RR U23	24 September 2026	WC	Viktória Chladoňová (SVK)	Isabella Holmgren (CAN)	Fleur Moors (BEL)	
(Canada) UCI Road World Championships RR Juniors	25 September 2026	WC	Alejandra Neira (ESP)	Matilde Rossignoli (ITA)	Anja Grossmann (SUI)	
(Canada) UCI Road World Championships RR Elite	26 September 2026	WC	Demi Vollering (NED)	Katarzyna Niewiadoma-Phinney (POL)	Elisa Longo Borghini (ITA)	

== Single day races (1.1 and 1.2) ==
Race	Date	Cat. †	Winner	Second	Third	Ref
(Peru) 2025 Bolivarian Games ITT	27 November 2025	1.2	(Colombia) Diana Peñuela	(Colombia) Lina Hernández	(Venezuela) Lilibeth Chacón	
(Peru) 2025 Bolivarian Games RR	5 December 2025	1.2	(Colombia) Juliana Londoño	(Colombia) Lina Hernández	(Colombia) Diana Peñuela	
(Spain) Trofeo Marratxi-Felanitx	24 January 2026	1.1	(France) Maëva Squiban; UAE Team ADQ	(Switzerland) Marlen Reusser; Movistar Team	(Italy) Silvia Persico; UAE Team ADQ	
(El Salvador) Grand Prix San Salvador	24 January 2026	1.1	(United Kingdom) Francesca Hall; Roland Le Dévoluy	(Ukraine) Yuliia Biriukova; Laboral Kutxa–Fundación Euskadi	(Italy) Irene Cagnazzo; Vini Fantini–BePink	
(Spain) Trofeo Llucmajor	25 January 2026	1.1	(United Kingdom) Cat Ferguson; Movistar Team	(France) Clara Copponi; Lidl–Trek	(Netherlands) Sofie van Rooijen; UAE Team ADQ	
Grand Prix El Salvador	25 January 2026	1.1	(Ukraine) Yuliia Biriukova; Laboral Kutxa–Fundación Euskadi	(United Kingdom) Cat Ferguson; Movistar Team	Angie Londoño; Colombia (national team)	
(Spain) Trofeo Binissalem-Andratx	26 January 2026	1.1	(Netherlands) Karlijn Swinkels; UAE Team ADQ	(Germany) Liane Lippert; Movistar Team	(Norway) Mie Bjørndal Ottestad; Uno-X Mobility	
(El Salvador) Grand Prix Longitudinal del Norte	27 January 2026	1.1	(Colombia) Paula Patiño; Laboral Kutxa–Fundación Euskadi	(United Kingdom) Francesca Hall; Roland Le Dévoluy	(Italy) Giorgia Vettorello; Roland Le Dévoluy	
(El Salvador) Grand Prix Oriente	28 January 2026	1.1	(Netherlands) Marjolein van 't Geloof; Laboral Kutxa–Fundación Euskadi	(Italy) Vittoria Grassi; Vini Fantini–BePink	(Chile) Catalina Soto; Laboral Kutxa–Fundación Euskadi	
(Spain) Pionera Race-SCV	1 February 2026	1.1	(Italy) Arianna Fidanza; Laboral Kutxa–Fundación Euskadi	(France) Laura Asencio; Ma Petite Entreprise	(Norway) Oda Aune Gissinger; Hitec Products–Fluid Control	
(Belgium) Omloop van het Hageland	1 March 2026	1.1	(Netherlands) Charlotte Kool; Fenix–Premier Tech	(Republic of Ireland) Lara Gillespie; UAE Team ADQ	(Belgium) Shari Bossuyt; AG Insurance–Soudal	
(Belgium) Le Samyn des Dames	2 March 2026	1.1	(Republic of Ireland) Lara Gillespie; UAE Team ADQ	(Belgium) Marthe Goossens; AG Insurance–Soudal	(Belgium) Marthe Truyen; Fenix–Premier Tech	
(Croatia) UMAG Classic Ladies	4 March 2026	1.2	(Slovenia) Nika Bobnar; Nexetis	(Italy) Camilla Bezzone; Team Mendelspeck E-Work	(Lithuania) Rasa Leleivytė; Aromitalia Vaiano	
(Croatia) Poreč Classic Ladies	8 March 2026	1.2	(Switzerland) Jasmin Liechti; Nexetis	(Poland) Olga Wankiewicz; MAT Atom Deweloper Wrocław	(Germany) Corinna Lechner; Wheel Divas	
(Italy) Trofeo Oro in Euro	8 March 2026	1.1	(Italy) Elisa Longo Borghini; UAE Team ADQ	(Netherlands) Karlijn Swinkels; UAE Team ADQ	(Poland) Dominika Włodarczyk; UAE Team ADQ	
(Belgium) Midwest Cycling Classic	22 March 2026	1.1	(Netherlands) Lonneke Uneken; VolkerWessels Cycling Team	(Italy) Martina Alzini; Cofidis	(Belgium) Hélène Hesters; Liv AlUla Jayco Women's Continental Team	
(Italy) Giro dell'Appennino Donne	22 March 2026	1.1	(Italy) Silvia Persico; UAE Team ADQ	(Netherlands) Lucinda Brand; Lidl–Trek	(Canada) Sarah Van Dam; Visma–Lease a Bike	
(Netherlands) NXT Classic	4 April 2026	1.2	(Belgium) Anna Vanderaerden; Fenix–Premier Tech Development Team	Femke Markus; Netherlands (national team)	(Denmark) Amalie Dideriksen; Cofidis	
(Belgium) Ronde de Mouscron	6 April 2026	1.1	(France) Clara Copponi; Lidl–Trek	(Norway) Susanne Andersen; Uno-X Mobility	(Spain) Alicia González Blanco; St. Michel–Preference Home–Auber93	
(France) Région Pays de la Loire Tour	8 April 2026	1.1	(Denmark) Amalie Dideriksen; Cofidis	(France) Justine Gegu; Mayenne Monbana My Pie	(France) Océane Goergen; Vendée Feminine RVC	
(France) Grand Prix Féminin de Chambéry	19 April 2026	1.1	(France) Célia Gery; FDJ United–Suez	(Italy) Erica Magnaldi; UAE Team ADQ	(Belgium) Lore De Schepper; AG Insurance–Soudal	
(Spain) Gran Premio Ciudad de Eibar	19 April 2026	1.1	(Spain) Usoa Ostolaza; Laboral Kutxa–Fundación Euskadi	(Spain) Maite Urteaga; Eulen-Amenabar	(Spain) Sandra Alonso; Eneicat–CMTeam	
(Italy) Gran Premio della Liberazione Donne	25 April 2026	1.1	(Switzerland) Jasmin Liechti; Nexetis	(Germany) Magdalena Leis; UAE Team ADQ Development Team	(Netherlands) Nina Kessler; Nexetis	
(Netherlands) Omloop van Borsele	25 April 2026	1.1	(Netherlands) Nicole Steigenga; AG Insurance Soudal Devo Team	(United Kingdom) Erin Boothman; Liv AlUla Jayco Women's Continental Team	(Belgium) Dina Scavone; Carbonbike Giordana Sofré by Gen Z	
(Belgium) Grote Prijs Immo Zone	1 May 2026	1.1	(Belgium) Lien Schampaert; Keukens Redant Cycling Team	(Norway) Nora Tveit; Human Powered Health	(Belgium) Dina Scavone; Carbonbike Giordana Sofré by Gen Z	
(Benin) Grand Prix des Amazones	2 May 2026	1.2	Awa Bamogo; Burkina Faso (national team)	Adèle Guissou; Burkina Faso (national team)	Lamoussa Zoungrana; Burkina Faso (national team)	
(Luxembourg) Grand Prix Elsy Jacobs	2 May 2026	1.1	(Poland) Marta Lach; Team SD Worx–Protime	(Netherlands) Femke Gerritse; Team SD Worx–Protime	(Netherlands) Eline Jansen; VolkerWessels Cycling Team	
Festival Elsy Jacobs Luxembourg	3 May 2026	1.1	(United Kingdom) Erin Boothman; Liv AlUla Jayco Women's Continental Team	(Switzerland) Steffi Häberlin; Team SD Worx–Protime	Nina Berton; MIX Luxembourg/Iceland	
(France) La Classique Morbihan	8 May 2026	1.1	(United Kingdom) Abi Miller; UAE Development Team	(Spain) Eva Anguela; Cantabria Deporte - Rio Miera	(France) Valentine Fortin; Cofidis	
(France) Grand Prix du Morbihan Femmes	9 May 2026	1.1	(Netherlands) Eline Jansen; VolkerWessels Cycling Team	(Canada) Sidney Swierenga; Liv AlUla Jayco Women's Continental Team	(France) Émilie Morier; St. Michel–Preference Home–Auber93	
(Belgium) Trofee Maarten Wynants	10 May 2026	1.1	(France) Gladys Verhulst; AG Insurance–Soudal	(Belgium) Marith Vanhove; AG Insurance–Soudal	(Netherlands) Scarlett Souren; VolkerWessels Cycling Team	
(Netherlands) Omloop der Kempen Ladies	16 May 2026	1.1	Lorena Wiebes; Netherlands (national team)	(Netherlands) Charlotte Kool; Fenix–Premier Tech	(Belgium) Sandrine Tas; Lotto–Intermarché Ladies	
(Spain) Durango-Durango Emakumeen Saria	19 May 2026	1.1	(Spain) Paula Blasi; UAE Team ADQ	(France) Évita Muzic; FDJ United–Suez	(United Kingdom) Alice Towers; EF Education–Oatly	
(Netherlands) Veenendaal-Veenendaal	22 May 2026	1.1	(Netherlands) Charlotte Kool; Fenix–Premier Tech	(Austria) Kathrin Schweinberger; Human Powered Health	(Netherlands) Nienke Veenhoven; Visma–Lease a Bike	
(Belgium) GP Mazda Schelkens	25 May 2026	1.1	(Netherlands) Charlotte Kool; Fenix–Premier Tech	(Canada) Maggie Coles-Lyster; Human Powered Health	(Netherlands) Mylène de Zoete; Fenix–Premier Tech	
(France) Tour du Haut Limousin Féminin	25 May 2026	1.2	(France) Océane Mahé; Ma Petite Entreprise	(Italy) Giorgia Vettorello; Dévoluy-Région Sud Ladies Cycling Team	(Spain) Ainara Albert; Dévoluy-Région Sud Ladies Cycling Team	
(Belgium) Dwars door de Westhoek	7 June 2026	1.1	(Italy) Federica Venturelli; UAE Team ADQ	(Netherlands) Lonneke Uneken; VolkerWessels Cycling Team	(Poland) Marta Lach; Team SD Worx–Protime	
(France) Alpes Gresivaudan Classic	7 June 2026	1.1	(Australia) Talia Appleton; Liv AlUla Jayco Women's Continental Team	(France) Clémence Latimier; Ma Petite Entreprise	(France) Ema Comte; Cofidis	
(Belgium) Elmos Dwars door het Hageland	20 June 2026	1.2	(Belgium) Dina Scavone; Carbonbike Giordana Sofré by Gen Z	(Netherlands) Puck Langenbarg; Fenix–Premier Tech Development Team	(Belgium) Falke Kerkhof; Cyclingteam Belco / Van Eyck	
(Belgium) Argenta Classic - Deurne	5 July 2026	1.1	(Republic of Ireland) Lara Gillespie; UAE Team ADQ	(Canada) Maggie Coles-Lyster; Human Powered Health	(Netherlands) Lonneke Uneken; VolkerWessels Cycling Team	
(Belgium) Dwars door Wingene	11 July 2026	1.2	(Italy) Martina Alzini; Cofidis	(Netherlands) Lonneke Uneken; VolkerWessels Cycling Team	(Belgium) Marith Vanhove; AG Insurance Soudal Devo Team	
Respect Ladies Race Slovakia	11 July 2026	1.2	(Austria) Tabea Huys; Tirol Women Cycling	(Slovakia) Sofia Ungerová; MAT Atom Deweloper Wrocław	(Luxembourg) Liv Wenzel; Tirol Women Cycling	
(Belgium) Grote Prijs CHW Beveren	12 July 2026	1.2	(Belgium) Marith Vanhove; AG Insurance Soudal Devo Team	(Netherlands) Scarlett Souren; VolkerWessels Cycling Team	(Slovenia) Nika Bobnar; NEXETIS	
(France) La Périgord Ladies	18 July 2026	1.1	(Netherlands) Eva van Agt; FDJ United–Suez	(Netherlands) Karlijn Swinkels; UAE Team ADQ	(Australia) Mackenzie Coupland; Liv AlUla Jayco	
(France) La Picto en Nouvelle-Aquitaine	19 July 2026	1.1	(Netherlands) Nicole Steigenga; AG Insurance–Soudal	(Australia) Josie Talbot; Liv AlUla Jayco	(Netherlands) Anneke Dijkstra; VolkerWessels Cycling Team	
(Dominican Republic) Central American and Caribbean Games (ITT)	25 July 2026	1.2	(Cuba) Marlies Mejías	(Mexico) Sara Roel	(Trinidad and Tobago) Teniel Campbell	
(Dominican Republic) Central American and Caribbean Games (RR)	1 August 2026	1.2	(Cuba) Marlies Mejías	(Trinidad and Tobago) Teniel Campbell	(Mexico) Yareli Acevedo	
(Belgium) Egmont Cycling Race	18 August 2026	1.1	(Italy) Elisa Balsamo; Lidl–Trek	(Belgium) Hélène Hesters; Liv AlUla Jayco Women's Continental Team	(Denmark) Solbjørk Minke Anderson; EF Education–Oatly	
(Belgium) Konvert Koerse	21 August 2026	1.1	(Netherlands) Sofie van Rooijen; UAE Team L'Imad	(Netherlands) Charlotte Kool; Fenix–Premier Tech	(Austria) Kathrin Schweinberger; Human Powered Health	
(Italy) 2026 Mediterranean Games (ITT)	22 August 2026	1.2	(France) Amandine Muller	(Spain) Sandra Alonso	(Slovenia) Nika Bobnar	
(Italy) 2026 Mediterranean Games (RR)	24 August 2026	1.2	(Italy) Rachele Barbieri	(Italy) Martina Fidanza	(Italy) Barbara Guarischi	
(France) Kreiz Breizh Elites Dames	27 August 2026	1.1	(Netherlands) Loes Adegeest; Lidl–Trek	(Spain) Mavi García; UAE Team L'Imad	(Canada) Sarah Van Dam; Visma–Lease a Bike	
(United States) Philadelphia Cycling Classic	30 August 2026	1.1	(Italy) Chiara Consonni; Canyon//SRAM	(Canada) Alexandra Volstad; EF Education–Oatly	(United States) Ella Sabo; Virginia's Blue Ridge–Twenty28	
(Belgium) Muur Classic Geraardsbergen	2 September 2026	1.2	(Germany) Linda Riedmann; Lotto–Intermarché Ladies	(Belgium) Xaydée Van Sinaey; Fenix–Premier Tech	(Netherlands) Eline Jansen; VolkerWessels Cycling Team	
(France) Finistère Ladies Classic	5 September 2026	1.1	(Canada) Sarah Van Dam; Visma–Lease a Bike	(United States) Lily Williams; Human Powered Health	(Netherlands) Eva van Agt; Lidl–Trek	
À travers les Hauts-de-France	12 September 2026	1.1	(Netherlands) Nienke Veenhoven; Visma–Lease a Bike	(Belgium) Shari Bossuyt; AG Insurance–Soudal	(Republic of Ireland) Lara Gillespie; UAE Team L'Imad	
(Argentina) South American Games (ITT)	15 September 2026	1.2	(Chile) Aranza Villalón	(Paraguay) Agua Marina Espínola	(Argentina) Delfina Dibella	
(Belgium) Grand Prix de Wallonie	16 September 2026	1.1	(Netherlands) Karlijn Swinkels; UAE Team L'Imad	(Italy) Elisa Balsamo; Lidl–Trek	(France) Célia Gery; FDJ United–Suez	
(Canada) Chrono Gatineau	16 September 2026	1.1	Marlen Reusser; Switzerland (national team)	(Australia) Felicity Wilson-Haffenden; Lidl–Trek	(Australia) Lauretta Hanson; Lidl–Trek	
(Canada) Grand Prix Cycliste de Gatineau	17 September 2026	1.1	Steffi Häberlin; Switzerland (national team)	(Australia) Georgia Baker; Liv AlUla Jayco	Ava Holmgren; Canada U23 (national team)	
(Argentina) South American Games (RR)	18 September 2026	1.2	(Argentina) Julieta Benedetti	(Colombia) Lina Hernández	(Bolivia) Elizabeth Vásquez Ávila	
(France) Mirabelle Classic	26 September 2026	1.2	(Brazil) Gabriela Guerra; Wheel Divas	(France) Émilie Morier; St. Michel–Preference Home–Auber93	(France) Victoire Berteau; Cofidis	
(Belgium) Binche Chimay Binche pour Dames	6 October 2026	1.1	(Germany) Linda Riedmann; Lotto–Intermarché Ladies	(Netherlands) Charlotte Kool; Fenix–Premier Tech	(Netherlands) Nicole Steigenga; AG Insurance–Soudal	
(Dominican Republic) Caribbean Elite Road Cycling Championships (ITT)	10 October 2026	1.2	(Jamaica) Llori Sharpe	(Dominican Republic) María Mirabal	(Puerto Rico) Erialis Otero	
(Italy) Trofeo Tessile & Moda Donne	11 October 2026	1.1	Cancelled			
(Dominican Republic) Caribbean Elite Road Cycling Championships (RR)	11 October 2026	1.2	(Dominican Republic) Raquel Restituyo	(Bermuda) Gabriella Arnold	(Jamaica) Llori Sharpe	
(Italy) Veneto Women	14 October 2026	1.1	(Germany) Liane Lippert; Movistar Team	(Netherlands) Loes Adegeest; Lidl–Trek	(Italy) Elisa Longo Borghini; UAE Team L'Imad	
(France) Chrono des Nations	18 October 2026	1.1	(France) Maëva Squiban; UAE Team L'Imad	(Canada) Nadia Gontova; Liv AlUla Jayco	(France) Juliette Berthet; FDJ United–Suez	

== Gravel races ==
Race	Date	Cat. †	Winner	Second	Third	Ref
(Belgium) Flanders Legacy Gravel	19 October 2025	UGS	(Netherlands) Wendy Oosterwoud; PAS Racing	(Belgium) Nathalie Bex; Serso Gravel Team	(Netherlands) Tessa Neefjes; Giant Liv Benelux Offroad Team	
(Australia) Gravelista	26 October 2025	UGS	(New Zealand) Sharlotte Lucas; PAS Racing	(Australia) Sophie Byrne; Trek Bikes	(Australia) Ella Bloor	
(Thailand) Dustman	31 October – 1 November 2025	UGS	(United Kingdom) Caroline Livesey	(United Kingdom) Hayley Simmonds; Ribble Outliers		
(Portugal) Alentejo Gravel	9 November 2025	UGS	(Germany) Rosa Klöser; Canyon//SRAM Zondacrypto	(Netherlands) Tessa Neefjes; Giant Liv Benelux Offroad Team	(Spain) Marta Torà Milà	
(South Africa) The Ceder Race	14 February 2026	UGS	(South Africa) Hayley Preen; Factor Bikes	(South Africa) Lisa Bone; Cycle Nation Enza Construction	Daria Pravilova	
(Spain) Castellon Gravel Race	22 February 2026	UGS	(Argentina) Sofía Gómez Villafañe; Specialized Off-Road Team	(United States) Morgan Aguirre; PAS Racing	(Switzerland) Elena Hartmann	
Gravel Brazil	8 March 2026	UGS	(Brazil) Ana Luisa Panini	(Brazil) Ana Paula Finco	(United Kingdom) Madeleine Nutt	
(Belgium) Turnhout Gravel	22 March 2026	UGS	(Australia) Nicole Frain	(Netherlands) Anne Knijnenburg; VolkerWessels Cycling Team	(Netherlands) Wendy Oosterwoud; PAS Racing	
(Portugal) 114 Gravel Race	28 March 2026	UGS	(Australia) Nicole Frain	(Germany) Romy Kasper; Wheel Divas Cycling Team	(United Kingdom) Sophie Wright; Ribble Outliers	
(Argentina) Vuelta Altas Cumbres Gravel	29 March 2026	UGS	(Argentina) Carolina Maldonado	(Argentina) Fiorella Malaspina	(Argentina) María Laura Bugarin	
(Austria) Wörthersee Gravel Race	12 April 2026	UGS	(Australia) Nicole Frain	(Germany) Mieke Kröger; Rose Racing Circle	(Austria) Jana Gigele	
Monaco Gravel Race	19 April 2026	UGS	(United Kingdom) Sophie Wright; Ribble Outliers	(Australia) Nicole Frain	(France) Jade Wiel; FDJ United–Suez	
(United States) Highlands Gravel Classic	25 April 2026	UGS	(United States) Jenna Rinehard	(United States) Emily Newsom; PAS Racing	(Canada) Dylan Baker; The Cyclery Racing	
(Netherlands) Gravel One Fifty	25 April 2026	UGS	(Germany) Romy Kasper; PAS Racing	(Sweden) Clara Lundmark; Minimax Cycling Team	(Netherlands) Wendy Oosterwoud; PAS Racing	
(Italy) Giro Sardegna Gravel	1 May 2026	UGS	(Italy) Giorgia Vettorello; Dévoluy-Région Sud Ladies Cycling Team	(Netherlands) Tessa Neefjes; Giant Liv Benelux Offroad Team	(Netherlands) Nicolien Luijsterburg; Tenerife - Bike Point - Gsport	
(Netherlands) Marly Grav Race	10 May 2026	UGS	(Netherlands) Lorena Wiebes; Team SD Worx–Protime	(Netherlands) Larissa Hartog; Canyon x DT Swiss All-Terrain Racing	(Netherlands) Ilse Pluimers; AG Insurance–Soudal	
(Australia) Seven	16 May 2026	UGS	(Australia) Tiffany Cromwell; Canyon–SRAM Generation	(New Zealand) Maria Laurie; Whoosh	(Australia) Matilda Raynolds	
(United Kingdom) The Gralloch	16 May 2026	UGS	(Netherlands) Geerike Schreurs; Specialized Off-Road Team	(Poland) Karolina Migoń; PAS Racing	(Netherlands) Wendy Oosterwoud; PAS Racing	
(Poland) Gravel Adventure	6 June 2026	UGS	(Netherlands) Wendy Oosterwoud; PAS Racing	(Switzerland) Irina Lützelschwab	(Germany) Romy Kasper; Wheel Divas Cycling Team	
(Kenya) Safari Gravel Race	13 June 2026	UGS	(Rwanda) Claudette Nyirarukundo; Team Amani	(Canada) Sarah Diekmeyer	(Austria) Theresa Rindler Bachl	
(France) Wish One Millau Grands Causses	14 June 2026	UGS	(United Kingdom) Sophie Wright; Ribble Outliers	(United States) Sophia Schugar; Monarch Racing	(Germany) Leonie Laubig	
(Italy) Grand Tour 3 Cime Lavaredo	20 June 2026	UGS	(Poland) Karolina Migoń; PAS Racing	(Italy) Erica Magnaldi; UAE Team ADQ	(Italy) Debora Piana; FOL MTB	
(Australia) The Devils Cardigan	20 June 2026	UGS	(Australia) Holly Harris	(Australia) Michaela Rogan	(United Kingdom) Flora Johnson	
Eislek Gravel Luxembourg	21 June 2026	UGS	(Netherlands) Lorena Wiebes; Team SD Worx–Protime	(United Kingdom) Sophie Wright; Ribble Outliers	(Netherlands) Femke Gerritse; Team SD Worx–Protime	
(Canada) OG Classique	21 June 2026	UGS	(Canada) Haley Smith	(Canada) Dylan Baker; The Cyclery Racing	(Canada) Laetitia Bilodeau	
(Canada) Ghost of the Gravel	27 June 2026	UGS	(Canada) Gabby Traxler	(Sweden) Hanna Johansson	(Canada) Francesca Seal	
(Germany) Hegau Gravel Race	5 July 2026	UGS	(Germany) Nele Laing; Canyon x DT Swiss All-Terrain Racing	(Netherlands) Larissa Hartog; Canyon x DT Swiss All-Terrain Racing	(Netherlands) Malou Eisen; VolkerWessels Cycling Team	
(Switzerland) The Majestics	12 July 2026	UGS	(Switzerland) Elena Hartmann	(Switzerland) Olivia Hottinger	(Germany) Clara Koppenburg; Tudor Pro Cycling Gravel	
(Germany) 3RIDES Gravel Race	19 July 2026	UGS	(Germany) Nele Laing; Canyon DT Swiss ATR Team	(Switzerland) Elena Hartmann	(Australia) Nicole Frain; Factor Racing RCC	
(South Africa) Around the Pot	1 August 2026	UGS	(South Africa) Lisa Bone; Cycle Nation Enza Construction	(South Africa) Chloé Hopf	(South Africa) Catherine Kruger	
(Czech Republic) Gravel Tour Hlinsko	1 August 2026	UGS	(Australia) Nicole Frain; Factor Racing Team RCC	(Czech Republic) Kristýna Zemanová	(Netherlands) Wendy Oosterwoud; PAS Racing	
(Colombia) Gravel Bogota	2 August 2026	UGS	(Colombia) Natalia Franco	(Colombia) Valentina Ovalle		
(Latvia) Gravel Weekend	8 August 2026	UGS	(Netherlands) Marjolein van 't Geloof; Laboral Kutxa–Fundación Euskadi	(Netherlands) Wendy Oosterwoud; PAS Racing	(France) Axelle Dubau-Prévot; EF Education–Oatly	
(Japan) HYSK Gravel Classic Yakurai	22 August 2026	UGS	(Chinese Taipei) Hsu Shu-wei; A+ cycling studio	(Japan) Sachi Kataoka; Wadachiya Cycle Shop	(Japan) Chiharu Ukai	
(Namibia) Khomas100	22 August 2026	UGS	(South Africa) Hayley Preen	(Namibia) Vera Looser	(Namibia) Anri Greeff	
(Belgium) European Gravel Championships	30 August 2026	UGS	(Netherlands) Femke Markus	(Netherlands) Shirin van Anrooij	(France) Axelle Dubau-Prévot	
Gravel Arteaga Mexico	30 August 2026	UGS	(Mexico) Anet Barrera	(Mexico) Sara Röel	(Mexico) Ariana Tucci	
(Denmark) The Wolf	5 September 2026	UGS	(Germany) Romy Kasper; PAS Racing	(Netherlands) Elisa Serné; KDM-Pack Cycling Team vzw	(Netherlands) Wendy Oosterwoud; PAS Racing	
(United Kingdom) Graean Cymru	5–6 September 2026	UGS	(United Kingdom) Elizabeth Hermolle	(United Kingdom) Abi Smith	(United Kingdom) Ruby Carleton	
(Finland) Falling Leaves Gravel Race	12 September 2026	UGS	(Germany) Clara Koppenburg; RSV Seerose Friedrichshafen	(Netherlands) Maaike Coljé; Q36.5 Off Road Racing	(Netherlands) Elisa Serné; KDM - Pack Cycling Team vzw	
(Spain) Sea Otter Europe Girona	19 September 2026	UGS	(Germany) Rosa Klöser; Canyon-Sram-Maap	(Netherlands) Larissa Hartog; Canyon x DT Swiss All-Terrain Racing	(Netherlands) Marianne Vos; Visma–Lease a Bike	
(Estonia) Tartu Rattamaraton	19 September 2026	UGS	(Australia) Tiffany Cromwell	(Finland) Karoliina Leinonen; Tartu Rattaklubi	(Estonia) Aidi Gerde Tuisk	
(United States) Mammoth TUFF	19 September 2026	UGS	(United States) Laurel Quiñones	(United States) Jennifer Tavé	(Germany) Kira Stock	
(Sweden) Gravel Grit ’n Grind	26 September 2026	UGS	(Netherlands) Femke Markus; Team SD Worx–Protime	(Sweden) Caroline Bome	(Netherlands) Elisa Serné; Foodmaker X Gravelking	
(France) Pyrénées Catalanes Gravel Tour	26 September 2026	UGS	(Germany) Rosa Klöser; Canyon SRAM MAAP	(Australia) Nicole Frain; Factor Racing Team RCC	(Netherlands) Teuntje Beekhuis; Uno-X Mobility	
(Australia) UCI Gravel World Championships	10–11 October 2026	UGS	(Netherlands) Marianne Vos	(Germany) Rosa Klöser	(Netherlands) Larissa Hartog	

== Stage races (2.1 and 2.2) ==
Race	Date	Cat. †	Winner	Second	Third	Ref
17–21 January 2026	Tour El Salvador	Prologue	(Chile) Catalina Soto; Laboral Kutxa–Fundación Euskadi	(Spain) Ainara Albert; Roland Le Dévoluy	Lina Hernández; Colombia (national team)	
17–21 January 2026	Tour El Salvador	1	(Netherlands) Marjolein van 't Geloof; Laboral Kutxa–Fundación Euskadi	(Spain) Ainara Albert; Roland Le Dévoluy	Anastasiya Samsonova; Roland Le Dévoluy	
17–21 January 2026	Tour El Salvador	2	(Spain) Ainara Albert; Roland Le Dévoluy	(Colombia) Milena Salcedo; Pato Bike BMC Team	(Kazakhstan) Yelizaveta Sklyarova; Java Kiwi Atlántico	
17–21 January 2026	Tour El Salvador	3	(Chile) Catalina Soto; Laboral Kutxa–Fundación Euskadi	(Uzbekistan) Yanina Kuskova; Laboral Kutxa–Fundación Euskadi	(China) Zhou Qiuying; Shenzhen Gineyea–Xidesheng Cycling Team	
17–21 January 2026	Tour El Salvador	4	(Colombia) Paula Patiño; Laboral Kutxa–Fundación Euskadi	Jessenia Meneses; Colombia (national team)	(United Kingdom) Francesca Hall; Roland Le Dévoluy	
17–21 January 2026	Tour El Salvador	Overall	(Colombia) Paula Patiño; Laboral Kutxa–Fundación Euskadi; Winner	(Spain) Ainara Albert; Roland Le Dévoluy; 2nd place	(Spain) Naia Amondarain; Laboral Kutxa–Fundación Euskadi; 3rd place	
4–8 March 2026	Tour of Vietnam	1	Ayustina Delia Priatna; Indonesia (national team)	Elizabeth Liau; Singapore Women's Academy	(Vietnam) Nguyễn Thị Thật; Lộc Trời An Giang	
4–8 March 2026	Tour of Vietnam	2	(Vietnam) Nguyễn Thị Thật; Lộc Trời An Giang	Nastassia Kazak; Li-Ning Star Ladies	(Japan) Kasuga Watabe; Ion Gold Biwase Cycling Club	
4–8 March 2026	Tour of Vietnam	3	(Norway) Oda Aune Gissinger; Hitec Products–Fluid Control	Marina Komina; Li-Ning Star Ladies	(Sweden) Karin Söderqvist; Hitec Products–Fluid Control	
4–8 March 2026	Tour of Vietnam	4	Marina Komina; Li-Ning Star Ladies	(Sweden) Karin Söderqvist; Hitec Products–Fluid Control	(Uzbekistan) Yanina Kuskova; Pafgio Dema	
4–8 March 2026	Tour of Vietnam	5	(Norway) Magdalene Lind; Hitec Products–Fluid Control	Marina Komina; Li-Ning Star Ladies	(Sweden) Karin Söderqvist; Hitec Products–Fluid Control	
4–8 March 2026	Tour of Vietnam	Overall	Marina Komina; Li-Ning Star Ladies; Winner	(Sweden) Karin Söderqvist; Hitec Products–Fluid Control; 2nd place	(Norway) Oda Aune Gissinger; Hitec Products–Fluid Control; 3rd place	
6–8 March 2026	(Spain); Vuelta a Extremadura Femenina	1	(United Kingdom) Zoe Bäckstedt; Canyon//SRAM Zondacrypto	(Australia) Brodie Chapman; UAE Team ADQ	(France) Maëva Squiban; UAE Team ADQ	
6–8 March 2026	(Spain); Vuelta a Extremadura Femenina	2	(Italy) Chiara Consonni; Canyon//SRAM Zondacrypto	(Italy) Elisa Balsamo; Lidl–Trek	(New Zealand) Ally Wollaston; FDJ United–Suez	
6–8 March 2026	(Spain); Vuelta a Extremadura Femenina	3	(Australia) Mackenzie Coupland; Liv AlUla Jayco	(United Kingdom) Lauren Dickson; FDJ United–Suez	(Australia) Talia Appleton; Liv AlUla Jayco	
6–8 March 2026	(Spain); Vuelta a Extremadura Femenina	Overall	(Australia) Mackenzie Coupland; Liv AlUla Jayco; Winner	(United Kingdom) Lauren Dickson; FDJ United–Suez; 2nd place	(Australia) Talia Appleton; Liv AlUla Jayco; 3rd place	
10–14 March 2026	(Vietnam); BIWASE Cup	1	(Vietnam) Nguyễn Thị Thu Mai; Lộc Trời An Giang	(Norway) Oda Aune Gissinger; Hitec Products–Fluid Control	Ayustina Delia Priatna; Indonesia (national team)	
10–14 March 2026	(Vietnam); BIWASE Cup	2	Marina Komina; Li-Ning Star Ladies	(Denmark) Alma Walther Møller Rasmussen; Hitec Products–Fluid Control	Hao Zhang; XDS China Women Team	
10–14 March 2026	(Vietnam); BIWASE Cup	3	(Vietnam) Nguyễn Thị Thật; Lộc Trời An Giang	Valeriya Zakharkina; Biwase Cycling Club	(Denmark) Alma Walther Møller Rasmussen; Hitec Products–Fluid Control	
10–14 March 2026	(Vietnam); BIWASE Cup	4	(China) Zhu Shimeng; Li-Ning Star Ladies	(Vietnam) Lâm Thị Kim Ngân; Lộc Trời An Giang	(Vietnam) Quách Thị Phương Thanh; Biwase Cycling Club	
10–14 March 2026	(Vietnam); BIWASE Cup	5	(Vietnam) Nguyễn Thị Thật; Lộc Trời An Giang	(South Korea) Lee Eun-hee; Samyang Women's Cycling Team	(Japan) Kasuga Watabe; Ion Gold Biwase Cycling Club	
10–14 March 2026	(Vietnam); BIWASE Cup	Overall	(Denmark) Alma Walther Møller Rasmussen; Hitec Products–Fluid Control; Winner	(Vietnam) Nguyễn Thị Thu Mai; Lộc Trời An Giang; 2nd place	(Norway) Oda Aune Gissinger; Hitec Products–Fluid Control; 3rd place	
31 March – 2 April 2026	Tour of Thailand	1	Valeriya Zakharkina; GNC-Fnix Girl Power Cycling	(China) Zhu Shimeng; Li-Ning Star Ladies	Nguyễn Thị Thật; Vietnam (national team)	
31 March – 2 April 2026	Tour of Thailand	2	Jin Chenhong; XDS China Women Team	Yanina Kuskova; Uzbekistan (national team)	Nguyễn Thị Thật; Vietnam (national team)	
31 March – 2 April 2026	Tour of Thailand	3	Nguyễn Thị Thật; Vietnam (national team)	Jutatip Maneephan; Thailand Women's Cycling Team	(China) Su Ning; Bodywrap LTwoo Women's Cycling Team	
31 March – 2 April 2026	Tour of Thailand	Overall	Valeriya Zakharkina; GNC-Fnix Girl Power Cycling; Winner	(China) Zhu Shimeng; Li-Ning Star Ladies; 2nd place	Nguyễn Thị Thật; Vietnam (national team); 3rd place	
20–21 April 2026	(Uzbekistan); Grand Prix Fergana Ladies	1	Hao Zhang; XDS China Women Team	Yelizaveta Sklyarova; Kazakhstan (national team)	Angelina Burenkova; Kazakhstan (national team)	
20–21 April 2026	(Uzbekistan); Grand Prix Fergana Ladies	2	Rinata Sultanova; Kazakhstan (national team)	Haixin Dong; XDS China Women Team	Ayustina Delia Priatna; Indonesia (national team)	
20–21 April 2026	(Uzbekistan); Grand Prix Fergana Ladies	Overall	Hao Zhang; XDS China Women Team; Winner	Rinata Sultanova; Kazakhstan (national team); 2nd place	Haixin Dong; XDS China Women Team; 3rd place	
28–29 April 2026	(Uzbekistan); Tour of Bostonliq Ladies	1	Shakhnoza Abdullaeva; 7 Saber Uzbekistan Cycling Team	Qiuying Zhou; XDS China Women Team	Hao Zhang; XDS China Women Team	
28–29 April 2026	(Uzbekistan); Tour of Bostonliq Ladies	2	Kristina Novikova; RRT Cycling Team	Yelizaveta Sklyarova; Kazakhstan (national team)	Hao Zhang; XDS China Women Team	
28–29 April 2026	(Uzbekistan); Tour of Bostonliq Ladies	Overall	Shakhnoza Abdullaeva; 7 Saber Uzbekistan Cycling Team; Winner	Qiuying Zhou; XDS China Women Team; 2nd place	Hao Zhang; XDS China Women Team; 3rd place	
29 April – 3 May 2026	(United States); Tour of the Gila	1	(United States) Lauren Stephens; Aegis x Leaders of Enchantment	(United States) Emily Ehrlich; Virginia's Blue Ridge–Twenty28	(United States) Ashley Frye; Competitive Edge Racing	
29 April – 3 May 2026	(United States); Tour of the Gila	2	(United States) Lauren Stephens; Aegis x Leaders of Enchantment	(United States) Ashley Frye; Competitive Edge Racing	(United States) Emily Gilbert; Virginia's Blue Ridge–Twenty28	
29 April – 3 May 2026	(United States); Tour of the Gila	3	(United States) Grace Arlandson; Aegis x Leaders of Enchantment	(United States) Lauren Stephens; Aegis x Leaders of Enchantment	(United States) Kira Payer; SpeedBlock p/b Terun	
29 April – 3 May 2026	(United States); Tour of the Gila	4	(United States) Ella Sabo; Virginia's Blue Ridge–Twenty28	(Canada) Camille Desrochers Laflamme; SpeedBlock p/b Terun	(United States) Grace Arlandson; Aegis x Leaders of Enchantment	
29 April – 3 May 2026	(United States); Tour of the Gila	5	(United States) Kylee Hanel; Aegis x Leaders of Enchantment	(United States) Grace Arlandson; Aegis x Leaders of Enchantment	(United States) Lauren Stephens; Aegis x Leaders of Enchantment	
29 April – 3 May 2026	(United States); Tour of the Gila	Overall	(United States) Lauren Stephens; Aegis x Leaders of Enchantment; Winner	(United States) Ashley Frye; Competitive Edge Racing; 2nd place	(United States) Emily Gilbert; Virginia's Blue Ridge–Twenty28; 3rd place	
30 April – 3 May 2026	(Czech Republic); Gracia–Orlová	1	(Australia) Emily Dixon; Canyon–SRAM Zondacrypto Generation	(Czech Republic) Kristýna Zemanová; VIF Cycling Team	(Slovakia) Sofia Ungerová; MAT Atom Deweloper Wrocław	
30 April – 3 May 2026	(Czech Republic); Gracia–Orlová	2	(Australia) Emily Dixon; Canyon–SRAM Zondacrypto Generation	(Switzerland) Jasmin Liechti; Nexetis	(Czech Republic) Kristýna Zemanová; VIF Cycling Team	
30 April – 3 May 2026	(Czech Republic); Gracia–Orlová	3a	(Germany) Stephanie Meder; Wheel Divas Cycling Team	(Switzerland) Jasmin Liechti; Nexetis	(Denmark) Silje Antvorskov; Team FRIIS	
30 April – 3 May 2026	(Czech Republic); Gracia–Orlová	3b	(Italy) Erja Giulia Bianchi; Canyon–SRAM Zondacrypto Generation	Anna Vanderaerden; Belgium (national team)	Auke De Buysser; Belgium (national team)	
30 April – 3 May 2026	(Czech Republic); Gracia–Orlová	4	(Slovakia) Sofia Ungerová; MAT Atom Deweloper Wrocław	(Poland) Urszula Sipko; MAT Atom Deweloper Wrocław	(Switzerland) Jasmin Liechti; Nexetis	
30 April – 3 May 2026	(Czech Republic); Gracia–Orlová	Overall	(Switzerland) Jasmin Liechti; Nexetis; Winner	Tess Moerman; Belgium (national team); 2nd place	(Slovakia) Sofia Ungerová; MAT Atom Deweloper Wrocław; 3rd place	
14–17 May 2026	(Czech Republic); Tour de Feminin	1 (TTT)	Emma Siegers; Luca Vierstraete; Ella Heremans; Tess Moerman; Anna Bruneel; Cleo Kiekens; Belgium (national team)	Ginia Caluori; Anina Hutter; Mara Winter; Annika Liehner; Lea Huber; Noelle Ingold (Switzerland) NEXETIS	Awen Roberts; Joëlle Messemer; Weronika Wąsaty; Monalisa Araya; Tsige Kahsay (Germany) Canyon–SRAM Zondacrypto Generation	
14–17 May 2026	(Czech Republic); Tour de Feminin	2	(Switzerland) Ginia Caluori; Nexetis	Malwina Mul; Poland (national team)	(Slovakia) Sofia Ungerová; MAT Atom Deweloper Wrocław	
14–17 May 2026	(Czech Republic); Tour de Feminin	3	Oda Aune Gissinger; Norway (national team)	(Switzerland) Lea Huber; Nexetis	Tabea Huys; Austria (national team)	
14–17 May 2026	(Czech Republic); Tour de Feminin	4	Kate Courtney; United States (national team)	(Czech Republic) Eliška Kvasničková; VIF Cycling Team	Malwina Mul; Poland (national team)	
14–17 May 2026	(Czech Republic); Tour de Feminin	Overall	(Switzerland) Ginia Caluori; Nexetis; Winner	Tess Moerman; Belgium (national team); 2nd place	(Slovakia) Sofia Ungerová; MAT Atom Deweloper Wrocław; 3rd place	
29–31 May 2026	(France); Bretagne Ladies Tour	1	(Belgium) Sandrine Tas; Lotto–Intermarché Ladies	(Denmark) Amalie Dideriksen; Cofidis	(Belgium) Hélène Hesters; Liv AlUla Jayco Women's Continental Team	
29–31 May 2026	(France); Bretagne Ladies Tour	2	(Switzerland) Jasmin Liechti; Nexetis	(Belgium) Luca Vierstraete; AG Insurance–Soudal	(France) Ema Comte; Cofidis	
29–31 May 2026	(France); Bretagne Ladies Tour	3	(Belgium) Sandrine Tas; Lotto–Intermarché Ladies	(France) Valentine Fortin; Cofidis	(France) Justine Gegu; Mayenne Monbana My Pie	
29–31 May 2026	(France); Bretagne Ladies Tour	Overall	(Switzerland) Jasmin Liechti; Nexetis; Winner	(Belgium) Sandrine Tas; Lotto–Intermarché Ladies; 2nd place	(Italy) Letizia Borghesi; AG Insurance–Soudal; 3rd place	
2–7 June 2026	Vuelta a Colombia Femenina	1	(Colombia) Lina Hernández; Mujeres Ant-Org Paisa	(Venezuela) Lilibeth Chacón; Eneicat–CMTeam	(Colombia) Milena Salcedo; Pato Bike BMC Team	
2–7 June 2026	Vuelta a Colombia Femenina	2	(Colombia) Diana Peñuela; Team Sistecredito	(Colombia) Angie Londoño; Just Cycling Viem Team	(Colombia) Laura Rojas; Team Sistecredito	
2–7 June 2026	Vuelta a Colombia Femenina	3	(Colombia) Stefanía Sánchez; Team Sistecredito	(Colombia) Vanesa Zuluaga; Avinal - Carmen de Viboral	(Chile) Aranza Villalón; Eneicat–CMTeam	
2–7 June 2026	Vuelta a Colombia Femenina	4	(Venezuela) Lilibeth Chacón; Eneicat–CMTeam	(Guatemala) Gabriela Soto; Pato Bike BMC Team	(Colombia) Angie Londoño; Just Cycling Viem Team	
2–7 June 2026	Vuelta a Colombia Femenina	5	(Venezuela) Lilibeth Chacón; Eneicat–CMTeam	(Colombia) Zara Lamprea; Ciclismo Capital	(Colombia) Angie Londoño; Just Cycling Viem Team	
2–7 June 2026	Vuelta a Colombia Femenina	6	(Colombia) Laura Rojas; Team Sistecredito	(Venezuela) Lilibeth Chacón; Eneicat–CMTeam	(Colombia) Zara Lamprea; Ciclismo Capital	
2–7 June 2026	Vuelta a Colombia Femenina	Overall	(Venezuela) Lilibeth Chacón; Eneicat–CMTeam; Winner	(Colombia) Angie Londoño; Just Cycling Viem Team; 2nd place	(Colombia) Laura Rojas; Team Sistecredito; 3rd place	
18–19 June 2026	(Uzbekistan); Grand Prix Jizzakh Ladies	1	Yanina Kuskova; Uzbekistan (national team)	Shakhnoza Abdullaeva; 7 Saber Uzbekistan Cycling Team	Madina Kakhkhorova; Uzbekistan (national team)	
18–19 June 2026	(Uzbekistan); Grand Prix Jizzakh Ladies	2	Yanina Kuskova; Uzbekistan (national team)	Madina Kakhkhorova; Uzbekistan (national team)	Shakhnoza Abdullaeva; 7 Saber Uzbekistan Cycling Team	
18–19 June 2026	(Uzbekistan); Grand Prix Jizzakh Ladies	Overall	Yanina Kuskova; Uzbekistan (national team); Winner	Madina Kakhkhorova; Uzbekistan (national team); 2nd place	Shakhnoza Abdullaeva; 7 Saber Uzbekistan Cycling Team; 3rd place	
19–21 June 2026	(Spain); Volta a Catalunya Femenina	1	(Netherlands) Nienke Veenhoven; Visma–Lease a Bike	(Netherlands) Marianne Vos; Visma–Lease a Bike	(France) Valentine Fortin; Cofidis	
19–21 June 2026	(Spain); Volta a Catalunya Femenina	2	(Spain) Paula Blasi; UAE Team ADQ	(France) Célia Gery; FDJ United–Suez	(Canada) Sidney Swierenga; Liv AlUla Jayco Women's Continental Team	
19–21 June 2026	(Spain); Volta a Catalunya Femenina	3	(Netherlands) Marianne Vos; Visma–Lease a Bike	(Netherlands) Nienke Veenhoven; Visma–Lease a Bike	(Netherlands) Nicole Steigenga; AG Insurance–Soudal	
19–21 June 2026	(Spain); Volta a Catalunya Femenina	Overall	(Spain) Paula Blasi; UAE Team ADQ; Winner	(France) Célia Gery; FDJ United–Suez; 2nd place	(Canada) Sidney Swierenga; Liv AlUla Jayco Women's Continental Team; 3rd place	
1–5 July 2026	Volta a Portugal Femenina	1	(Belgium) Emma Siegers; AG Insurance Soudal Devo Team	(Spain) Maite Urteaga; EULEN-AMENABAR	(Belgium) Annelies Nijssen; Lotto–Intermarché Ladies	
1–5 July 2026	Volta a Portugal Femenina	2	(Italy) Martina Alzini; Cofidis	(Czech Republic) Kristýna Burlová; Cofidis	(Spain) Eva Anguela; Cantabria Deporte - Rio Miera	
1–5 July 2026	Volta a Portugal Femenina	3	(France) Marion Borras; Cofidis	(France) Victoire Berteau; Cofidis	(Belgium) Annelies Nijssen; Lotto–Intermarché Ladies	
1–5 July 2026	Volta a Portugal Femenina	4	(Germany) Linda Riedmann; Lotto–Intermarché Ladies	Valeria Valgonen; Toyota Valencia | SAV Women's Cycling Team	(France) Victoire Berteau; Cofidis	
1–5 July 2026	Volta a Portugal Femenina	5	(Belgium) Hélène Hesters; Liv AlUla Jayco Women's Continental Team	(Republic of Ireland) Emma Jeffers; Liv AlUla Jayco Women's Continental Team	Valeria Valgonen; Toyota Valencia | SAV Women's Cycling Team	
1–5 July 2026	Volta a Portugal Femenina	Overall	(France) Victoire Berteau; Cofidis; Winner	(Spain) Maite Urteaga; EULEN-AMENABAR; 2nd place	(Belgium) Annelies Nijssen; Lotto–Intermarché Ladies; 3rd place	
15–19 July 2026	(Belgium); Baloise Ladies Tour	Prologue	(United Kingdom) Zoe Bäckstedt; Canyon//SRAM	(United Kingdom) Millie Couzens; Fenix–Premier Tech	(Belgium) Fleur Moors; Lidl–Trek	
15–19 July 2026	(Belgium); Baloise Ladies Tour	1	(Netherlands) Nienke Veenhoven; Visma–Lease a Bike	(Netherlands) Charlotte Kool; Fenix–Premier Tech	(United Kingdom) Zoe Bäckstedt; Canyon//SRAM	
15–19 July 2026	(Belgium); Baloise Ladies Tour	2	(Netherlands) Charlotte Kool; Fenix–Premier Tech	(Netherlands) Nienke Veenhoven; Visma–Lease a Bike	(Netherlands) Maike van der Duin; Canyon//SRAM	
15–19 July 2026	(Belgium); Baloise Ladies Tour	3a	(United Kingdom) Zoe Bäckstedt; Canyon//SRAM	(Australia) Felicity Wilson-Haffenden; Lidl–Trek	(Belgium) Lotte Kopecky; Team SD Worx–Protime	
15–19 July 2026	(Belgium); Baloise Ladies Tour	3b	(Netherlands) Nienke Veenhoven; Visma–Lease a Bike	(France) Gladys Verhulst; AG Insurance–Soudal	(Netherlands) Maike van der Duin; Canyon//SRAM	
15–19 July 2026	(Belgium); Baloise Ladies Tour	4	(Netherlands) Nienke Veenhoven; Visma–Lease a Bike	(Netherlands) Charlotte Kool; Fenix–Premier Tech	(Netherlands) Maike van der Duin; Canyon//SRAM	
15–19 July 2026	(Belgium); Baloise Ladies Tour	Overall	(United Kingdom) Zoe Bäckstedt; Canyon//SRAM; Winner	(Netherlands) Nienke Veenhoven; Visma–Lease a Bike; 2nd place	(Australia) Felicity Wilson-Haffenden; Lidl–Trek; 3rd place	
13–16 August 2026	Vuelta Femenina a Guatemala	1	(Colombia) Angie Londoño; Asociación de Sololá - Intercop R.L.	(United States) Galen Bolard; Competitive Edge Racing	Marcela Peñafiel; Ecuador (national team)	
13–16 August 2026	Vuelta Femenina a Guatemala	2	(Colombia) Angie Londoño; Asociación de Sololá - Intercop R.L.	(United States) Ashley Frye; Competitive Edge Racing	(Mexico) Sara Röel; Latin Allstars	
13–16 August 2026	Vuelta Femenina a Guatemala	3	(United States) Ashley Frye; Competitive Edge Racing	(Mexico) Sara Röel; Latin Allstars	(United States) Galen Bolard; Competitive Edge Racing	
13–16 August 2026	Vuelta Femenina a Guatemala	4	Marcela Peñafiel; Ecuador (national team)	(United States) Mia Aseltine; Competitive Edge Racing	Mikela Molina; Ecuador (national team)	
13–16 August 2026	Vuelta Femenina a Guatemala	Overall	(United States) Ashley Frye; Competitive Edge Racing; Winner	(Mexico) Sara Röel; Latin Allstars; 2nd place	(Colombia) Angie Londoño; Asociación de Sololá - Intercop R.L. 3rd place	
17–20 August 2026	Tour Cycliste International Féminin du Burundi	1	Yelizaveta Sklyarova; Kazakhstan (national team)	(Ethiopia) Meresiet Gebrehiwet; Team Amani	(Rwanda) Claudette Nyirarukundo; Team Amani	
17–20 August 2026	Tour Cycliste International Féminin du Burundi	2	Yelizaveta Sklyarova; Kazakhstan (national team)	(Rwanda) Claudette Nyirarukundo; Team Amani	(Ethiopia) Haftu Eyerusalem Reda; Team Amani	
17–20 August 2026	Tour Cycliste International Féminin du Burundi	3	(South Africa) Taneal Otto; Team Tshenolo Women's Pro Cycling	(Ethiopia) Meresiet Gebrehiwet; Team Amani	(Rwanda) Claudette Nyirarukundo; Team Amani	
17–20 August 2026	Tour Cycliste International Féminin du Burundi	4	(Ethiopia) Haftu Eyerusalem Reda; Team Amani	(South Africa) Sonica Klopper; Team Tshenolo Women's Pro Cycling	(South Africa) Taneal Otto; Team Tshenolo Women's Pro Cycling	
17–20 August 2026	Tour Cycliste International Féminin du Burundi	5	(Ethiopia) Haftu Eyerusalem Reda; Team Amani	(South Africa) Taneal Otto; Team Tshenolo Women's Pro Cycling	(Ethiopia) Meresiet Gebrehiwet; Team Amani	
17–20 August 2026	Tour Cycliste International Féminin du Burundi	Overall	(Ethiopia) Meresiet Gebrehiwet; Team Amani; Winner	(South Africa) Taneal Otto; Team Tshenolo Women's Pro Cycling; 2nd place	(Rwanda) Claudette Nyirarukundo; Team Amani; 3rd place	
27–30 August 2026	(Italy); Giro della Toscana Int. Femminile – Memorial Michela Fanini	Prologue	(Netherlands) Lonneke Uneken; VolkerWessels Cycling Team	(Netherlands) Scarlett Souren; VolkerWessels Cycling Team	(Netherlands) Anne Knijnenburg; VolkerWessels Cycling Team	
27–30 August 2026	(Italy); Giro della Toscana Int. Femminile – Memorial Michela Fanini	1	(Italy) Martina Alzini; Cofidis	(Italy) Nadia Quagliotto; Cofidis	(Slovenia) Nika Bobnar; Nexetis	
27–30 August 2026	(Italy); Giro della Toscana Int. Femminile – Memorial Michela Fanini	2	(Canada) Sidney Swierenga; Liv AlUla Jayco Women's Continental Team	(Netherlands) Malou Eisen; VolkerWessels Cycling Team	(Netherlands) Maya Kingma; Aromitalia Vaiano	
27–30 August 2026	(Italy); Giro della Toscana Int. Femminile – Memorial Michela Fanini	3	(France) Victoire Berteau; Cofidis	(Italy) Nadia Quagliotto; Cofidis	(Belgium) Xaydée Van Sinaey; Fenix–Premier Tech	
27–30 August 2026	(Italy); Giro della Toscana Int. Femminile – Memorial Michela Fanini	Overall	(Canada) Sidney Swierenga; Liv AlUla Jayco Women's Continental Team; Winner	(Netherlands) Malou Eisen; VolkerWessels Cycling Team; 2nd place	(France) Victoire Berteau; Cofidis; 3rd place	
5–7 September 2026	(United States); Maryland Cycling Classic	Cancelled				
10–13 September 2026	(France); Faun Tour Femmes	1	(France) Solène Muller; St. Michel–Preference Home–Auber93	(Netherlands) Nienke Vinke; Team SD Worx–Protime	(United Kingdom) Anna Henderson; Lidl–Trek	
10–13 September 2026	(France); Faun Tour Femmes	2	(France) Juliette Berthet; FDJ United–Suez	(New Zealand) Niamh Fisher-Black; Lidl–Trek	(United Kingdom) Lauren Dickson; FDJ United–Suez	
10–13 September 2026	(France); Faun Tour Femmes	3	(France) Juliette Berthet; FDJ United–Suez	(New Zealand) Niamh Fisher-Black; Lidl–Trek	(United Kingdom) Lauren Dickson; FDJ United–Suez	
10–13 September 2026	(France); Faun Tour Femmes	4	(United Kingdom) Lauren Dickson; FDJ United–Suez	(France) Juliette Berthet; FDJ United–Suez	(New Zealand) Niamh Fisher-Black; Lidl–Trek	
10–13 September 2026	(France); Faun Tour Femmes	Overall	(France) Juliette Berthet; FDJ United–Suez; Winner	(New Zealand) Niamh Fisher-Black; Lidl–Trek; 2nd place	(United Kingdom) Lauren Dickson; FDJ United–Suez; 3rd place	
17–20 September 2026	(Italy); Giro Mediterraneo in Rosa	Cancelled (Note: The race were run from 18–20 September, although it is not in UCI calendar as per previous year, suggesting the race was running as a national event.)				
30 September – 4 October 2026	Vuelta Internacional Femenina a Costa Rica	1	Catalina Soto; Chile (national team)	(Ukraine) Nataliia Safroniuk; Pato Bike BMC Team	(Costa Rica) Dixiana Quesada; Colono Bikestation Kölbi	
30 September – 4 October 2026	Vuelta Internacional Femenina a Costa Rica	2	(Ukraine) Nataliia Safroniuk; Pato Bike BMC Team	Catalina Soto; Chile (national team)	Aranza Villalón; Chile (national team)	
30 September – 4 October 2026	Vuelta Internacional Femenina a Costa Rica	3	Catalina Soto; Chile (national team)	(Ukraine) Nataliia Safroniuk; Pato Bike BMC Team	(Costa Rica) Dixiana Quesada; Colono Bikestation Kölbi	
30 September – 4 October 2026	Vuelta Internacional Femenina a Costa Rica	4	(Colombia) Jessica Parra; Pato Bike BMC Team	(Colombia) Camila Valbuena; Manza Té La Selva No Varix	(Costa Rica) Gloriana Quesada; Colono Bikestation Kölbi	
30 September – 4 October 2026	Vuelta Internacional Femenina a Costa Rica	5	Catalina Soto; Chile (national team)	(Mexico) Diana Valeria Rodríguez; Megasuper Wild Protein	Aranza Villalón; Chile (national team)	
30 September – 4 October 2026	Vuelta Internacional Femenina a Costa Rica	Overall	(Colombia) Jessica Parra; Pato Bike BMC Team; Winner	(Colombia) Camila Valbuena; Manza Té La Selva No Varix; 2nd place	(Ukraine) Nataliia Safroniuk; Pato Bike BMC Team; 3rd place	
13–18 October 2026	(Netherlands); Holland Ladies Tour	Prologue	(Netherlands) Lieke Nooijen; Visma–Lease a Bike	(Netherlands) Charlotte Kool; Fenix–Premier Tech	(Netherlands) Lonneke Uneken; VolkerWessels Cycling Team	
13–18 October 2026	(Netherlands); Holland Ladies Tour	1	(Belgium) Sandrine Tas; Lotto–Intermarché Ladies	(Netherlands) Charlotte Kool; Fenix–Premier Tech	(Italy) Barbara Guarischi; Team SD Worx–Protime	
13–18 October 2026	(Netherlands); Holland Ladies Tour	2	(Netherlands) Lieke Nooijen; Visma–Lease a Bike	(Netherlands) Nienke Vinke; Team SD Worx–Protime	(Belgium) Sandrine Tas; Lotto–Intermarché Ladies	
13–18 October 2026	(Netherlands); Holland Ladies Tour	3	(Netherlands) Femke Markus; Team SD Worx–Protime	(Netherlands) Lieke Nooijen; Visma–Lease a Bike	(Netherlands) Maud Rijnbeek; VolkerWessels Cycling Team	
13–18 October 2026	(Netherlands); Holland Ladies Tour	4	(Italy) Letizia Borghesi; AG Insurance–Soudal	(United Kingdom) Pfeiffer Georgi; Team Picnic–PostNL	(Netherlands) Lieke Nooijen; Visma–Lease a Bike	
13–18 October 2026	(Netherlands); Holland Ladies Tour	5	(Belgium) Marthe Truyen; Fenix–Premier Tech	(Netherlands) Scarlett Souren; VolkerWessels Cycling Team	(Netherlands) Charlotte Kool; Fenix–Premier Tech	
13–18 October 2026	(Netherlands); Holland Ladies Tour	Overall	(Netherlands) Lieke Nooijen; Visma–Lease a Bike; Winner	(Netherlands) Femke Markus; Team SD Worx–Protime; 2nd place	(Italy) Letizia Borghesi; AG Insurance–Soudal; 3rd place	

== National champions ==
=== Women's Elite ===
Country	Women's Elite Road Race Champion	Road Race Champion's Team	Women's Elite Time Trial Champion	Time Trial Champion's Team
Afghanistan	Fariba Hashimi	Vini Fantini–BePink	Fariba Hashimi	Vini Fantini–BePink
Algeria	Nesrine Houili	WCC Team	Nesrine Houili	WCC Team
Andorra	Raquel Balboa	Andona Andbank	Anna Albalat	Andona Andbank
Angola	Megan Brechet			
Antigua and Barbuda			Aoife Smith	
Argentina			Fiorella Malaspina	
Australia	Mackenzie Coupland	Liv AlUla Jayco	Felicity Wilson-Haffenden	Lidl–Trek
Austria	Katharina Sadnik	Visma–Lease a Bike	Christina Schweinberger	Fenix–Premier Tech
Bahamas	Kami Roach		Kami Roach	
Belarus	Anastasiya Kolesava	Canyon//SRAM	Polina Konrad	
Belgium	Shari Bossuyt	AG Insurance–Soudal	Lotte Claes	Fenix–Premier Tech
Belize	Patricia Chavarria	Chavarria's Cycling Club	Patricia Chavarria	Chavarria's Cycling Club
Benin	Charlotte Metoevi		Hermionne Ahouissou	
Bermuda			Gabriella Arnold	
Bolivia	Sara Nicole Torrico	Pio Rico Cycling Team	Abigail Sarabia	Hecho en Bolivia
Bosnia and Herzegovina			Anastasija Ćorović	
Brazil	Wellyda Regisleyne dos Santos Rodrigues		Tamires Radatz	
Bulgaria	Gergana Stoyanova	RC ARBÖ-ASKÖ Rapso Knittelfeld	Gergana Stoyanova	RC ARBÖ-ASKÖ Rapso Knittelfeld
Burkina Faso	Awa Bamogo			
Cameroon	Floriane Bengono		Mariolle Kengne Feudjio	
Canada	Maggie Coles-Lyster	Human Powered Health	Nadia Gontova	Liv AlUla Jayco
Cayman Islands	Jessica Carney		Alyssa Burgess	
Chile	Catalina Soto	Laboral Kutxa–Fundación Euskadi	Catalina Soto	Laboral Kutxa–Fundación Euskadi
China	Li Guo	XDS China Women Team	Hao Zhang	XDS China Women Team
Colombia	Laura Daniela Rojas	Team Sistecredito	Diana Peñuela	Team Sistecredito
Costa Rica	Dixiana Quesada		Gloriana Quesada	Colono bikestation Kölbi
Croatia	Andrea Heged		Andrea Heged	
Cuba				
Cyprus			Antri Christoforou	
Czech Republic	Julia Kopecký	Team SD Worx–Protime	Julia Kopecký	Team SD Worx–Protime
Denmark	Amalie Dideriksen	Cofidis	Sif Nikoline Bendix Madsen	
Dominican Republic	Flor Espiritusanto			
Ecuador	Ana Maria Torres	Best PC Ecuador	Ana Maria Torres	Best PC Ecuador
Egypt	Ebtissam Mohamed	Dubai Police Cycling Team	Ebtissam Mohamed	Dubai Police Cycling Team
El Salvador			Sonia de Acevedo	
Eritrea	Suzana Fiseha		Monalisa Araya	Canyon//SRAM
Estonia	Elisabeth Ebras	Lotto–Intermarché Ladies	Kaidi Kivioja	
Eswatini	Nozipho Fakudze			
Ethiopia	Betelhem Denta		Kahsay Tsige Kiros	Canyon//SRAM
Finland	Heidi Antikainen	Minimax Cycling Team	Emilia Holmila	
France	Célia Gery	FDJ United–Suez	Célia Le Mouël	Ma Petite Entreprise
Gambia	Isatou Mendy			
Germany	Franziska Koch	FDJ United–Suez	Franziska Koch	FDJ United–Suez
Greece	Argiro Milaki	Aromitalia Vaiano	Eleftheria Giachou	ODL Team - Kiwi Atlantico - Craega
Guatemala	Gabriela Soto		Gabriela Soto	
Guinea-Bissau	Dodo Humberto Ié		Dodo Humberto Ié	
Guyana	Denise Jeffrey		Denise Jeffrey	
Honduras	Linda Menéndez		Linda Menéndez	
Hong Kong	Lee Sze Wing		Lee Sze Wing	
Hungary	Petra Zsankó	Aromitalia Vaiano	Petra Zsankó	Aromitalia Vaiano
India	Ganga Dadin		Harshita Jakhar	
Indonesia	Ayustina Delia Priatna		Ayustina Delia Priatna	
Iran			Reyhaneh Khatouni	
Ireland	Lara Gillespie	UAE Team ADQ	Lara Gillespie	UAE Team ADQ
Iceland	Bríet Kristý Gunnarsdóttir		Hafdís Sigurðardóttir	
Israel	Adar Shriki	E.C. Mataró Skoda-Mogadealer Women's Team	Noa Shweky	E.C. Mataró Skoda-Mogadealer Women's Team
Italy	Elisa Longo Borghini	UAE Team ADQ		
Jamaica			Llori Sharpe	
Japan	Akari Kobayashi	Kasseien Fiets Huis CT		
Jordan	Samah Khaled		Maryam Shaban	
Kazakhstan	Rinata Sultanova	UAE Team ADQ Development Team	Rinata Sultanova	UAE Team ADQ Development Team
Kosovo			Enilda Zeqiri	
Kenya	Kendra Masiga			
Latvia	Kitija Siltumēna	KDM - Pack Cycling Team vzw	Dana Rožlapa	
Lesotho				
Lithuania	Akvilė Gedraitytė	Dubai Police Cycling Team	Olivija Baleišytė	Dubai Police Cycling Team
Luxembourg	Marie Schreiber	Team SD Worx–Protime	Nina Berton	EF Education–Oatly
Malaysia	Nur Aisyah Mohd Zubir		Intan Suraya Tokiman	
Mali	Maimouna Diarra			
Mexico	Andrea Ramírez	Pato Bike BMC Team	Sara Röel	
Mauritius	Kimberley Le Court	AG Insurance–Soudal	Kimberley Le Court	AG Insurance–Soudal
Moldova				
Mongolia			Enkhjin Gantogtokh	
Morocco	Mallika Benallal		Majda Smouh	
Namibia	Anri Krugel		Anri Krugel	
Netherlands	Lieke Nooijen	Visma–Lease a Bike	Daniek Hengeveld	Visma–Lease a Bike
New Zealand	Ally Wollaston	FDJ United–Suez	Ella Wyllie	Liv AlUla Jayco
Norway	Sigrid Ytterhus Haugset	Uno-X Mobility	Katrine Aalerud	Uno-X Mobility
North Macedonia			Elena Petrova	
Pakistan				
Panama	Maraya López	Panamá Oeste	Wendy Ducreux	ILC-Cycling Team
Paraguay				
Peru	Mariana Rojas		Mariana Rojas	
Philippines	Mary Joyce Monton	L39ION of Los Angeles	Phoebe Salazar	
Poland	Dominika Włodarczyk	UAE Team ADQ	Dominika Włodarczyk	UAE Team ADQ
Portugal	Maria Martins	Canyon//SRAM	Ana Caramelo	Matos Mobility Flexaco IHS
Puerto Rico	Erialis Otero			
Romania	Iana Balteș	Rembe / Rad-Net	Cătălina-Andreea Cătineanu	CSA Steaua București
Russia	Marina Komina	Li-Ning Star Ladies	Ekaterina Gurenkova	
Rwanda	Valentine Nzayisenga	Benediction Club	Jazilla Mwamikazi	WCC Team
Senegal	Anta Ndiaye			
Serbia	Marija Bajeva		Irina Stevanović	
Singapore	Louisa Middleditch		Louisa Middleditch	
Sint Maarten	Susan Piscione-Maidwell		Myrthe Sonneveld	
Syria			Dina Ihlasi	
Slovakia	Viktória Chladoňová	Visma–Lease a Bike	Viktória Chladoňová	Visma–Lease a Bike
Slovenia	Nika Bobnar	NEXETIS	Nika Bobnar	NEXETIS
South Africa	Tyler Jacobs		Ashleigh Moolman Pasio	AG Insurance–Soudal
South Korea	Jang Su-ji		Shin Ji-eun	
Spain	Mireia Benito	AG Insurance–Soudal	Mireia Benito	AG Insurance–Soudal
Sweden	Clara Lundmark	Minimax Cycling Team	Mika Söderström	
Switzerland	Steffi Häberlin	Team SD Worx–Protime	Jasmin Liechti	NEXETIS
Taiwan	Huang Ting-ying		Zeng Ke-xin	
Thailand	Phetdarin Somrat	Thailand Women's Cycling Team	Phetdarin Somrat	Thailand Women's Cycling Team
Trinidad and Tobago	Teniel Campbell	Smurfit Westrock Cycling Team	Teniel Campbell	Smurfit Westrock Cycling Team
Turkey	Reyhan Yakişir		Reyhan Yakişir	
Uganda				
Ukraine	Yuliia Biriukova	Laboral Kutxa–Fundación Euskadi	Yuliia Biriukova	Laboral Kutxa–Fundación Euskadi
United Arab Emirates	Safia Al-Sayegh	UAE Team ADQ Development Team	Safia Al-Sayegh	UAE Team ADQ Development Team
United Kingdom	Zoe Bäckstedt	Canyon//SRAM	Zoe Bäckstedt	Canyon//SRAM
United States	Kate Courtney	She Sends Racing	Taylor Knibb	
Uruguay	Luciana Wynants	Armonía Cycles	Mariana García Britos	Dolores Cycles
Uzbekistan	Viktoriya Polzunova	7 Saber Uzbekistan Cycling Team	Yanina Kuskova	
Venezuela	Lilibeth Chacón		Lilibeth Chacón	
Zimbabwe	Helen Mitchell		Helen Mitchell	

=== U23 ===
Country	Women's Elite Road Race Champion	Road Race Champion's Team	Women's Elite Time Trial Champion	Time Trial Champion's Team
Afghanistan				
Algeria			Mechab Malik	
Andorra				
Angola				
Argentina			Delfina Dibella	Vini Fantini–BePink
Australia			Sophia Sammons	Team Redcat
Austria	Tabea Huys	Tirol Women Cycling		
Bahamas			Kami Roach	
Belarus			Alina Karotkina	
Belgium			Luca Vierstraete	AG Insurance Soudal Devo Team
Belize			Celina Baldera	
Benin			Georgette Vignonfodo	WCC Team
Bolivia				
Bosnia and Herzegovina			Karla Kustura	
Brazil			Raica Milena Niquelatti	
Burkina Faso				
Canada			Alexandra Volstad	EF Education–Oatly
Cayman Islands				
Chile			Martina Torres	
China			Menghan Zhou	Bodywrap LTwoo Cycling Team
Colombia	Luciana Osorio	Mujeres Ant-Org Paisa	Samara Bedoya	Team Sistecredito
Costa Rica	Yailin Gómez	Manza Té La Selva No Varix	Yailin Gómez	Manza Té La Selva No Varix
Cuba				
Cyprus			Chloe Michaelidou	
Czech Republic				
Denmark				
Dominican Republic	Melsey Pérez			
Ecuador			Camila Salgado	Team Toscana Orasi
Egypt	Mentalla Belal		Gana Eliwa	
El Salvador			Sonia de Acevedo	
Eritrea			Hana Ayele	
Estonia	Laura Lizette Sander	Human Powered Health	Laura Lizette Sander	Human Powered Health
Eswatini				
Ethiopia			Kahsay Tsige Kiros	Canyon//SRAM
Finland			Emilia Holmila	
France	Lise Ménage	Team Abadie Magnan	Amandine Muller	AG Insurance Soudal Devo Team
Gambia	Isatou Mendy			
Germany	Laura Kronburger		Justyna Czapla	Canyon//SRAM
Greece	Vivian Sarri		Georgia Rompotou	
Guatemala			Andrea Fabiola Vásquez	
Guyana				
Hong Kong				
Hungary			Málna Mudra	ODL Team - Kiwi Atlantico - Craega
India	Ganga Dadin		Harshita Jakhar	
Indonesia	Andini Putri Anatasya		Nihayatuzzain Asshofi	
Ireland				
Iceland				
Israel	Noa Shweky		Noa Shweky	
Italy				
Japan				
Jordan			Hala Alshorbaji	
Kazakhstan	Violetta Kazakova	XDS China Women Team	Violetta Kazakova	XDS China Women Team
Kosovo			Enilda Zeqiri	
Kenya			Sherry Chepkemboi	
Latvia			Laura Belohvoščika	
Lesotho				
Lithuania	Gabija Jonaitytė		Gabija Jonaitytė	
Luxembourg	Liv Wenzel	Tirol Women Cycling	Liv Wenzel	Tirol Women Cycling
Malaysia				
Mali	Maimouna Diarra			
Mexico	Andrea Ramírez	Pato Bike BMC Team	Sara Röel	
Mauritius				
Moldova				
Morocco			Fatima Zohra Alahiane	
Mauritius			Camille Chasteau de Balyon	
Namibia			Delsia Janse van Vuuren	
Netherlands				
New Zealand			Kirsty Watts	Meridian Bikebug
Norway				
Pakistan				
Panama	Maraya López	Panamá Oeste	Wendy Ducreux	ILC-Cycling Team
Paraguay				
Peru				
Philippines	Angela Joy Marie Bermejo	Standard Insurance PHI	Angelica Elvira	Standard Insurance PHI
Poland			Maja Tracka	MAT Atom Deweloper Wrocław
Portugal				
Romania	Iana Balteș	Rembe / Rad-Net	Iana Balteș	Rembe / Rad-Net
Rwanda	Jazilla Mwamikazi	WCC Team	Jazilla Mwamikazi	WCC Team
Serbia	Marija Bajeva		Lana Gavrilović	
Singapore				
Syria				
Slovakia				
Slovenia			Zoja Ferlež	Torelli
South Africa			Marzaan Mellett	Cycle Nation Enza Construction
South Korea				
Spain			Laia Puigdefábregas	Massi-Baix Ter
Sweden				
Switzerland	Lorena Leu	Carbonbike Giordana Sofré by Gen Z	Mara Winter	NEXETIS
Taiwan				
Thailand	Pinpak Chiengsuan		Pittayapron Seatun	
Turkey				
Uganda				
Ukraine			Milana Ushakova	UAE Development Team
United Arab Emirates	Marwa Kahwar		Marwa Kahwar	
United Kingdom			Erin Boothman	Liv AlUla Jayco Women's Continental Team
United States	Katherine Sarkisov	CCB p/b Levine Law Group	Kylee Hanel	Aegis x Leaders of Enchantment
Uruguay	Florencia Revetria		Florencia Revetria	
Uzbekistan	Mohinabonu Elmurodova	7 Saber Uzbekistan Cycling Team	Asal Rizaeva	7 Saber Uzbekistan Cycling Team
Venezuela			Yeniret Roa	
Zimbabwe				

=== Juniors ===
Country	Women's Elite Road Race Champion	Road Race Champion's Team	Women's Elite Time Trial Champion	Time Trial Champion's Team
Afghanistan				
Algeria	Hadjer Bousba		Hadjer Bousba	
Andorra				
Angola				
Argentina	Abril Azimonti		Yasmin Almada	
Australia	Neve Parslow	ARA Skip Capital	Neve Parslow	ARA Skip Capital
Austria	Carolina Trattner		Carolina Trattner	
Bahamas	Anya Walker		Blue Gray	
Barbados	Alexis Lashley		Alexis Lashley	
Belarus	Marharyta Sadouskaya		Valerya Artsiushenka	
Belgium	Jana Gevers		Laura Fivé	Airtox - Carl Ras Junior Women
Belize	Irene Baki		Irene Baki	
Benin	Nissi Dassi		Nissi Dassi	
Bermuda			Naomi MacGuinness	
Bolivia	Cheyenne Isabel Urquizu	Pio Rico Cycling Team	Cheyenne Isabel Urquizu	Pio Rico Cycling Team
Bosnia and Herzegovina	Samedina Škrebo		Samedina Škrebo	
Brazil	Maitê Coelho da Silva	Eurinvest by Albi Vélo Sport	Maitê Coelho da Silva	Eurinvest by Albi Vélo Sport
Bulgaria	Daria Venkova		Daria Venkova	
Burkina Faso	Wendkouni Wassilatou Convolbo			
Canada	Molly Flynn		Elodie Malois	
Cayman Islands				
Chile	Alexandra Osorio		Alexandra Osorio	
China			Hao Zhang	XDS China Women Team
Colombia	Salome Vargas	Avinal - Carmen de Viboral	Estefanía Castillo	Team Sistecredito
Croatia	Iva Iličić		Iva Iličić	
Costa Rica	Jimena Arroyo		Francell Martínez	
Cuba				
Cyprus			Sotiriana Sofia Gavriel	U.C. Conscio Pedale del Sile
Czech Republic	Karolina Špicarová		Eva Drhová	
Denmark	Maia Howell	Shibden Apex RT	Ida Fialla	Grouwels-Watersley R&D Road Team
Dominican Republic	Nashla Grullón Cepeda			
Ecuador	Nahomi Jativa		Nahomi Jativa	
Egypt	Joudy El Sayed		Joudy El Sayed	
El Salvador			Sonia de Acevedo	
Eritrea	Hermela Simon		Rozina Berhane	
Estonia	Maria Jürisaar	The Lead Out Cycling Academy	Adeele Jaht	Minimax WB Ladies
Eswatini				
Ethiopia	Kssanet Gebreslasse		Kssanet Gebreslasse	
Finland	Lotte Borremans	Airtox - Carl Ras Junior Women	Lotte Borremans	Airtox - Carl Ras Junior Women
France	Justine Baud		Noémie Martinet	Team Féminin Chambéry
Gambia	Isatou Mendy			
Germany	Amandine Jakob			
Greece	Eleni Kaskani		Eleni Kaskani	
Guatemala	Ana Sofía Robles		Ana Sofía Robles	
Guyana	Denise Jeffrey		Denise Jeffrey	
Honduras	Evelyn Menendez		Evelyn Menendez	
Hong Kong	Tsz Yau Lee		Tsz Yau Lee	
Hungary			Virág Benedek	
India	Ganga Dadin		Harshita Jakhar	
Indonesia	Mila Safa Fidela		Aligya Keiko Hendranata	
Ireland	Emer Heverin	CAMS Majaco	Emer Heverin	CAMS Majaco
Iceland			Hekla Henningsdóttir	
Israel	Aviv Dunsky	Grouwels-Watersley R&D Road Team	Aviv Dunsky	Grouwels-Watersley R&D Road Team
Italy	Maria Acuti	Biesse–Carrera–Premac		
Japan	Nanami Ishikawa			
Jordan	Hala Alshorbaji		Natalia Aljarhi	
Kazakhstan	Anna Proskurina		Anel Tashbay	
Kosovo			Enilda Zeqiri	
Kenya	Naomi Jeptanui		Mercy Eragae	
Latvia	Kate Skujina		Kate Skujina	
Lesotho				
Lithuania	Augustė Mikutytė	Grouwels-Watersley R&D Road Team	Augustė Mikutytė	Grouwels-Watersley R&D Road Team
Luxembourg	Elena Lopes		June Nothum	Vermarc Cycling Team
Malaysia	Loo Ay Ron		Loo Ay Ron	
Mali	Amidou Sanogo			
Mexico	Andrea Ramírez	Pato Bike BMC Team	Sara Röel	
Mauritius				
Moldova				
Morocco	Imane Mestahi		Imane Mestahi	
Namibia	Rosemarie Thiel		Rosemarie Thiel	
Netherlands	Evie Reijn		Karlijn Wijma	WV Schijndel
New Zealand	Alex Milne		Neve McKenzie	Black Magic p/b Tineli
Norway	Karoline Flaterud	Airtox - Carl Ras Junior Women	Karoline Flaterud	Airtox - Carl Ras Junior Women
Pakistan				
Panama	Daibelys Torres		Sashelyn Castillo	
Paraguay				
Peru	Haru Quinto		Haru Quinto	
Philippines	Alejado Maria Louisse Crisselle		Alejado Maria Louisse Crisselle	
Poland	Zofia Glinka	MAT Atom Deweloper Wrocław Juniors	Maria Okrucińska	Grouwels-Watersley R&D Road Team
Portugal	Marta Esteves		Marta Esteves	
Puerto Rico	Daliana Colón			
Romania	Bianca-Cristina Pătrașcu		Antonia Orzan	
Rwanda	Donatha Akimana	Ngarama Sports Academy	Emeline Kanyange Zawadi	Bugesera Cycling Team
Senegal	Amina Cissé Sarr			
Serbia	Mila Starčević		Eva Lončarević	
Singapore			Grace Yu En Poh	
Syria				
Slovakia	Lujza Bartošiková		Karolina Hajduková	
Slovenia	Eva Terpin		Iva Colnar	Pika Team by Mastercard
South Africa	Madison Bateson		Helen Olwage	
South Korea				
Spain	Alejandra Neira		Alejandra Neira	
Sweden	Greta Andersson		Greta Andersson	
Switzerland	Anja Grossmann		Anja Grossmann	
Taiwan				
Thailand	Pummarat Chaloemkij		Kawisara Umkamnerd	
Trinidad and Tobago	Shameka Hoyte		Shameka Hoyte	
Turkey	Duygu Eser		Duygu Eser	
Uganda				
Ukraine	Polina Petrovych		Kira Dubinina	
United Arab Emirates	Malak Zadeh		Afraa Almihal	
United Kingdom			Aalia Clay	
United States	Sophia Wellmeier		Liliana Edwards	
Uruguay	Sol Mockford		Sol Mockford	
Uzbekistan				
Venezuela	Yoseny Cespedes		María Joaquina Sánchez	
Zimbabwe	Lilyarna Eggersglusz		Lilyarna Eggersglusz	

== Criterium National champions ==
=== Elite ===
Date	Venue	Podium		Team
9 January 2026	Australia; Perth	1	Ruby Roseman-Gannon	Liv AlUla Jayco
9 January 2026	Australia; Perth	2	Alexandra Manly	AG Insurance–Soudal
9 January 2026	Australia; Perth	3	Josie Talbot	Liv AlUla Jayco
17 January 2026	New Zealand; Invercargill	1	Kyra Marett	
17 January 2026	New Zealand; Invercargill	2	Sharlotte Lucas	
17 January 2026	New Zealand; Invercargill	3	Jaye Atkin	Black Magic p/b Tineli
22 February 2026	Philippines	1	Mary Joyce Monton	L39ION of Los Angeles
22 February 2026	Philippines	2	Maritanya Lucas Krog	Standard Insurance PHI
22 February 2026	Philippines	3	Phoebe Salazar	
29 May 2026	Russia; Velikiye Luki	1	Kristina Novikova	Panorama-Sestroretsk Women's Cycling Team
29 May 2026	Russia; Velikiye Luki	2	Anastasiya Samsonova	Roland Le Dévoluy
29 May 2026	Russia; Velikiye Luki	3	Marina Komina	Li-Ning Star Ladies
17–18 June 2026	United States; Charleston	1	Kendall Ryan	Caldera Medical x Aurea Racing
17–18 June 2026	United States; Charleston	2	Olivia Cummins	Virginia's Blue Ridge–Twenty28
17–18 June 2026	United States; Charleston	3	Ella Sabo	Virginia's Blue Ridge–Twenty28
20 June 2026	Guatemala; San Juan Ostuncalco	1	Gabriela Soto	Banrural-Tropigas
20 June 2026	Guatemala; San Juan Ostuncalco	2	Cynthia Lee	ADD Sololá
20 June 2026	Guatemala; San Juan Ostuncalco	3	Madeleine Morán	
21 June 2026	Iceland	1	Bríet Kristý Gunnarsdóttir	Tindur
21 June 2026	Iceland	2	Hafdís Sigurðardóttir	HFA
21 June 2026	Iceland	3	Silja Jóhannesdóttir	HFA
26 June 2026	United Kingdom; Aberystwyth	1	Megan Barker	RCC Racing
26 June 2026	United Kingdom; Aberystwyth	2	Carys Lloyd	Movistar Team
26 June 2026	United Kingdom; Aberystwyth	3	Eilidh Shaw	UAE Development Team
26 June 2026	Norway	1	Mia Gjertsen	Uno-X Mobility
26 June 2026	Norway	2	Anita Stenberg	IK Hero
26 June 2026	Norway	3	Camilla Rånes Bye	Minimax Cycling Team
5 July 2026	Belarus	1	Anastasiya Kolesava	Canyon//SRAM
5 July 2026	Belarus	2	Anhelina Krasko	
5 July 2026	Belarus	3	Yana Daniluk	Peloton-CCN

=== U23 ===
Date	Venue	Podium		Team
22 February 2026	Philippines	1	Raven Joy Valdez	Standard Insurance PHI
22 February 2026	Philippines	2	Althea Campaña	
22 February 2026	Philippines	3	Angeline Elvira	
17–18 June 2026	United States; Charleston	1	Ella Sabo	Virginia's Blue Ridge–Twenty28
17–18 June 2026	United States; Charleston	2	Lyllie Sonnemann	CCB Kenetik p/b Levine Law Group
17–18 June 2026	United States; Charleston	3	Chloe Patrick	Caldera Medical x Aurea Racing
20 June 2026	Guatemala; San Juan Ostuncalco	1	Hania Puac	ADD Sololá
20 June 2026	Guatemala; San Juan Ostuncalco	2	Andrea Vásquez	Rudy Cycling
20 June 2026	Guatemala; San Juan Ostuncalco	3	Jessica Nicho	ADD Sololá
26 June 2026	Norway	1	Mia Gjertsen	Uno-X Mobility
26 June 2026	Norway	2		
26 June 2026	Norway	3		
4 July 2026	Lesotho; Maseru	1	Pontso Makatile	
4 July 2026	Lesotho; Maseru	2	Lebohang Selepe	
4 July 2026	Lesotho; Maseru	3	Katleho Ralenono	

=== Juniors ===
Date	Venue	Podium		Team
9 January 2026	Australia; Perth	1	Elsie Apps	ARA Skip Capital
9 January 2026	Australia; Perth	2	Neve Parslow	ARA Skip Capital
9 January 2026	Australia; Perth	3	Billie Russell	
17 January 2026	New Zealand; Invercargill	1	Alex Milne	
17 January 2026	New Zealand; Invercargill	2	Olivia Greenaway Ewing	
17 January 2026	New Zealand; Invercargill	3	Sophie Best	
22 February 2026	Philippines	1	Maria Louisse Crisselle Alejado	
22 February 2026	Philippines	2	Althea Nicole Coronado	
22 February 2026	Philippines	3	Eloiza Pajarito	
29 May 2026	Russia; Velikiye Luki	1	Olesya Semenova	
29 May 2026	Russia; Velikiye Luki	2	Alena Mironova	
29 May 2026	Russia; Velikiye Luki	3	Kristina Galkina	
17–18 June 2026	United States; Charleston	1	Emma Jimenez Palos	City Bikes Miami Racing
17–18 June 2026	United States; Charleston	2	Sophia Wellmeier	Team California Academy
17–18 June 2026	United States; Charleston	3	Tessa Beebe	BYRDS Cycling
20 June 2026	Guatemala; San Juan Ostuncalco	1	Ana Sofía Robles	Banrural-Tropigas
20 June 2026	Guatemala; San Juan Ostuncalco	2	Erika Mazariegos	ADD Quetzaltenango
20 June 2026	Guatemala; San Juan Ostuncalco	3	Kimberly Santizo	ADD Quetzaltenango
26 June 2026	Norway	1	Karoline Flaterud	Airtox - Carl Ras Junior Women
26 June 2026	Norway	2	Emilie Flugsrud	
26 June 2026	Norway	3	Sereina Snerthammer	

== Gravel National champions ==
=== Elite ===
Date	Venue	Podium		Team
30 May 2026	Australia; Tailem Bend	1	Tiffany Cromwell	Canyon//SRAM
30 May 2026	Australia; Tailem Bend	2	Tori Barry	Bikewheels.com.au Cycling Team
30 May 2026	Australia; Tailem Bend	3	Sophie Edwards	Butterfields Ziptrak Racing
14 June 2026	South Africa; Breyten	1	Hayley Preen	
14 June 2026	South Africa; Breyten	2	Lisa Bone	Cycle Nation Enza Construction
14 June 2026	South Africa; Breyten	3	Samantha Sanders	
20 June 2026	Guatemala; Santa Lucía Cotzumalguapa	1	Mary Daggett	
20 June 2026	Guatemala; Santa Lucía Cotzumalguapa	2	Kimberly Luna	
20 June 2026	Guatemala; Santa Lucía Cotzumalguapa	3		
21 June 2026	Latvia; Ranka Parish	1	Evelīna Ermane-Marčenko	
21 June 2026	Latvia; Ranka Parish	2	Renāte Rodionova	
21 June 2026	Latvia; Ranka Parish	3	Krista Pūcītė	
5 July 2026	Brazil	1	Flávia Oliveira	
5 July 2026	Brazil	2	Isabella Lacerda	
5 July 2026	Brazil	3	Ana Laura Oliveira de Moraes	Soul Extreme Racing Team
11 July 2026	Romania; Sibiu	1	Miruna Măda	
11 July 2026	Romania; Sibiu	2	Denisa Tuțu Diaconu	
11 July 2026	Romania; Sibiu	3	Mihaela Lupoian	
11 July 2026	Italy; Gemona del Friuli	1	Erica Magnaldi	UAE Team ADQ
11 July 2026	Italy; Gemona del Friuli	2	Carlotta Borello	Cingolani-Specialized
11 July 2026	Italy; Gemona del Friuli	3	Debora Piana	Fol Racing Team
8 August 2026	Czech Republic	1	Kristýna Zemanová	VIF Cycling Team
8 August 2026	Czech Republic	2	Jitka Čábelická	Cabtech Racing Team
8 August 2026	Czech Republic	3	Karla Nováková	

=== Juniors ===
Date	Venue	Podium		Team
30 May 2026	Australia; Tailem Bend	1	Elise Harvey	
30 May 2026	Australia; Tailem Bend	2		
30 May 2026	Australia; Tailem Bend	3		

== Beachrace National champions ==
=== Elite ===
Date	Venue	Podium		Team
1 February 2026	Netherlands	1	Puck Pinxt	
1 February 2026	Netherlands	2	Mariëlle Trouwborst	
1 February 2026	Netherlands	3	Silje Bader	KDM - Pack Cycling Team vzw

=== Champions in UCI women's teams ===
UCI Women's Teams
Team	Road Race Champions	Time Trial Champions
AG Insurance–Soudal	(Belgium) Shari Bossuyt (Mauritius) Kimberley Le Court (Spain) Mireia Benito	(Mauritius) Kimberley Le Court (South Africa) Ashleigh Moolman Pasio (Spain) Mireia Benito
Canyon//SRAM	(Belarus) Anastasiya Kolesava (Portugal) Maria Martins (United Kingdom) Zoe Bäckstedt	(Ethiopia) Kahsay Tsige Kiros (Eritrea) Monalisa Araya (United Kingdom) Zoe Bäckstedt
EF Education–Oatly		(Luxembourg) Nina Berton
FDJ United–Suez	(France) Célia Gery (Germany) Franziska Koch (New Zealand) Ally Wollaston	(Germany) Franziska Koch
Fenix–Premier Tech		(Austria) Christina Schweinberger (Belgium) Lotte Claes
Human Powered Health	(Canada) Maggie Coles-Lyster	
Lidl–Trek		(Australia) Felicity Wilson-Haffenden
Liv AlUla Jayco	(Australia) Mackenzie Coupland	(Canada) Nadia Gontova (New Zealand) Ella Wyllie
Movistar Team		
Team Picnic–PostNL		
Team SD Worx–Protime	(Czech Republic) Julia Kopecký (Luxembourg) Marie Schreiber (Switzerland) Steffi Häberlin	(Czech Republic) Julia Kopecký
Visma–Lease a Bike	(Austria) Katharina Sadnik (Netherlands) Lieke Nooijen (Slovakia) Viktória Chladoňová	(Netherlands) Daniek Hengeveld (Slovakia) Viktória Chladoňová
UAE Team ADQ	(Italy) Elisa Longo Borghini (Republic of Ireland) Lara Gillespie (Poland) Dominika Włodarczyk	(Republic of Ireland) Lara Gillespie (Poland) Dominika Włodarczyk
Uno-X Mobility	(Norway) Sigrid Ytterhus Haugset	(Finland) Anniina Ahtosalo (Norway) Katrine Aalerud

UCI Women's ProTeams
Team	Road Race Champions	Time Trial Champions
Cofidis	(Denmark) Amalie Dideriksen	
Laboral Kutxa–Fundación Euskadi	(Chile) Catalina Soto (Ukraine) Yuliia Biriukova	(Chile) Catalina Soto (Ukraine) Yuliia Biriukova
Lotto–Intermarché Ladies	(Estonia) Elisabeth Ebras	
Ma Petite Entreprise		(France) Célia Le Mouël
Mayenne Monbana My Pie		
St. Michel–Preference Home–Auber93		
VolkerWessels Cycling Team		

== Continental championships ==
Championships	Race	Winner	Second	Third
CAC Road Cycling African Championships; Kenya 19–23 December 2025 (2025 summary)	Road race	Hayley Preen (RSA)	Birikti Fessehaye (ERI)	Claudette Nyirarukundo (RWA)
CAC Road Cycling African Championships; Kenya 19–23 December 2025 (2025 summary)	Individual time trial	Lucy Young (RSA)	Aurelie Halbwachs (MRI)	Xaverine Nirere (RWA)
CAC Road Cycling African Championships; Kenya 19–23 December 2025 (2025 summary)	Individual time trial (U23)	Nesrine Houili (ALG)	Jazilla Mwamikazi (RWA)	Monalisa Araya (ERI)
CAC Road Cycling African Championships; Kenya 19–23 December 2025 (2025 summary)	Road race (Junior)	Kahsay Tsige Kiros (ETH)	Yvonne Masengesho (RWA)	Kssanet Gebreslasse (ETH)
CAC Road Cycling African Championships; Kenya 19–23 December 2025 (2025 summary)	Individual time trial (Junior)	Kahsay Tsige Kiros (ETH)	Adyam Tesfu (ERI)	Yvonne Masengesho (RWA)
CAC Road Cycling African Championships; Kenya 19–23 December 2025 (2025 summary)	Mixed Team Time Trial	Mauritius (MRI); Aurelie Halbwachs; Jeremy Raboude; Aurélien De Comarmond; Raphaëlle Lamusse; Lucie de Marigny-Lagesse; Alexandre Mayer	Rwanda (RWA); Xaverine Nirere; Diane Ingabire; Martha Ntakirutimana; Moise Mugisha; Shemu Nsengiyumva; Etienne Tuyizere	Algeria (ALG); Nesrine Houili; Mechab Malik; Imene Maldji; Nassim Saidi; Youcef Reguigui; Hamza Amari
Oceania Gravel Championships; Australia 23 January 2026 (2026 summary)	Elite	Nicole Frain (AUS)	Tiffany Cromwell (AUS)	Samara Sheppard (NZL)
Asian Cycling Championships; Saudi Arabia 5–11 February 2026 (2026 summary)	Road race	Hao Zhang (CHN)	Nafosat Kozieva (UZB)	Shin Ji-eun (KOR)
Asian Cycling Championships; Saudi Arabia 5–11 February 2026 (2026 summary)	Individual time trial	Rinata Sultanova (KAZ)	Leung Wing Yee (HKG)	Hao Zhang (CHN)
Asian Cycling Championships; Saudi Arabia 5–11 February 2026 (2026 summary)	Road race (U23)	Samira Ismailova (UZB)	He Hongyang (CHN)	Violetta Kazakova (KAZ)
Asian Cycling Championships; Saudi Arabia 5–11 February 2026 (2026 summary)	Individual time trial (U23)	Zhao Qing (CHN)	Mariya Yelkina (KAZ)	Asal Rizaeva (UZB)
Asian Cycling Championships; Saudi Arabia 5–11 February 2026 (2026 summary)	Road race (Junior)	Anel Tashbay (KAZ)	Nanami Ishikawa (JPN)	Gulhayo Sattarova (UZB)
Asian Cycling Championships; Saudi Arabia 5–11 February 2026 (2026 summary)	Individual time trial (Junior)	Anel Tashbay (KAZ)	Law Ching-kiu (HKG)	Anjali Jakhar (IND)
Asian Cycling Championships; Saudi Arabia 5–11 February 2026 (2026 summary)	Mixed Team Time Trial	Hong Kong (HKG); Vincent Lau Wan Yau; Yang Qianyu; Lee Sze Wing; Ng Pak Hang; Chu Tsun-wai; Leung Wing-yee	Kazakhstan (KAZ); Yevgeniy Fedorov; Nicolas Vinokurov; Mansur Beisembay; Rinata Sultanova; Mariya Yelkina; Angelina Burenkova	China (CHN); Zhao Qing; Dong Haixin; Hao Zhang; Qu Chengjun; Su Haoyu; Ming Xue
Asian Cycling Championships; Saudi Arabia 5–11 February 2026 (2026 summary)	Junior Mixed Team Time Trial	Kazakhstan (KAZ); Gleb Novikov; Aruzhan Kabdulova; Irina Ivanovskaya; Anel Tashbay; Almir Valiev; Murat Kuitenov	Uzbekistan (UZB); Chingiz Chuliev; Fazliddin Ergashev; Shoislom Shoakmalov; Raksana Khikmatova; Ekaterina Makarochkina; Gulhayo Sattarova	China (CHN); Xing Aofei; Li Mengping; He Yingxuan; Cheng Hexuan; Zhang Qiaochu; Huang Sichen
Pan American Cycling Championships; Colombia 17–22 March 2026 (2026 summary)	Road race	Catalina Soto (CHI)	Julieta Benedetti (ARG)	Diana Peñuela (COL)
Pan American Cycling Championships; Colombia 17–22 March 2026 (2026 summary)	Individual time trial	Kristen Faulkner (USA)	Emily Ehrlich (USA)	Aranza Villalón (CHI)
Pan American Cycling Championships; Colombia 17–22 March 2026 (2026 summary)	Road race (Junior)	Salomé Vargas (COL)	Jennifer Lagos (VEN)	Alexandra Osorio (CHI)
Pan American Cycling Championships; Colombia 17–22 March 2026 (2026 summary)	Individual time trial (Junior)	Maitê Coelho da Silva (BRA)	Estefanía Castillo (COL)	Lineth García (COL)
Oceania Road Championships; Australia 9–10 April 2026 (2026 summary)	Road race	Tully Schweitzer (AUS)	Sophia Sammons (AUS)	Katelyn Nicholson (AUS)
Oceania Road Championships; Australia 9–10 April 2026 (2026 summary)	Individual time trial	Bronwyn MacGregor (NZL)	Katelyn Nicholson (AUS)	Ula Chrabaszcz (AUS)
Oceania Road Championships; Australia 9–10 April 2026 (2026 summary)	Individual time trial (U23)	Sophia Sammons (AUS)	Miriam Sinnerbrink (AUS)	Piper Karras (NZL)
Oceania Road Championships; Australia 9–10 April 2026 (2026 summary)	Road race (Junior)	Chloe Bowen (AUS)	Neve Parslow (AUS)	Alex Milne (NZL)
Oceania Road Championships; Australia 9–10 April 2026 (2026 summary)	Individual time trial (Junior)	Megan Moore (AUS)	Neve Parslow (AUS)	Jesse Thomson (NZL)
Central American Cycling Championships; Costa Rica 9–12 April 2026 (2026 summary)	Road race	Dixiana Quesada (CRC)	Gabriela Soto (GUA)	Gloriana Quesada (CRC)
Central American Cycling Championships; Costa Rica 9–12 April 2026 (2026 summary)	Individual time trial	Gloriana Quesada (CRC)	Gabriela Soto (GUA)	Alondra Granados (CRC)
Central American Cycling Championships; Costa Rica 9–12 April 2026 (2026 summary)	Road race (Junior)	Ana Sofía Robles (GUA)	Fátima Elizondo (CRC)	Alison Rodas (GUA)
Central American Cycling Championships; Costa Rica 9–12 April 2026 (2026 summary)	Individual time trial (Junior)	Fátima Elizondo (CRC)	Francell Martínez (CRC)	Alison Rodas (GUA)
Road Balkan Championships; Kosovo 5–7 June 2026 (2026 summary)	Road race	Wendy Bunea (ROU)	Georgia Rompotou (GRE)	Cătălina-Andreea Cătineanu (ROU)
Road Balkan Championships; Kosovo 5–7 June 2026 (2026 summary)	Individual time trial	Georgia Rompotou (GRE)	Elena Petrova (MKD)	Cătălina-Andreea Cătineanu (ROU)
Road Balkan Championships; Kosovo 5–7 June 2026 (2026 summary)	Road race (Junior)	Maria Ilianna Fakazi (GRE)	Duygu Eser (TUR)	Bianca Cristina Pătrașcu (ROU)
Road Balkan Championships; Kosovo 5–7 June 2026 (2026 summary)	Individual time trial (Junior)	Daria Venkova (BUL)	Maria Ilianna Fakazi (GRE)	Antonia Orzan (ROU)
Road Balkan Championships; Kosovo 5–7 June 2026 (2026 summary)	Road race (Youth)	Ioana Anamaria Pătrașcu (ROU)	Andriana Samara (GRE)	Mara Perșoiu-Târâtu (ROU)
Road Balkan Championships; Kosovo 5–7 June 2026 (2026 summary)	Individual time trial (Youth)	Mara Perșoiu-Târâtu (ROU)	Andriana Samara (GRE)	Ioana Anamaria Pătrașcu (ROU)
European Road Cycling Championships; Slovenia 2–7 October 2026 (2026 summary)	Road race	Demi Vollering (NED)	Puck Pieterse (NED)	Marlen Reusser (SUI)
European Road Cycling Championships; Slovenia 2–7 October 2026 (2026 summary)	Individual time trial	Marlen Reusser (SUI)	Demi Vollering (NED)	Juliette Berthet (FRA)
European Road Cycling Championships; Slovenia 2–7 October 2026 (2026 summary)	Mixed relay	France (FRA); Juliette Berthet; Thibault Guernalec; Rémi Cavagna; Maëva Squiban; Cédrine Kerbaol; Bruno Armirail	Italy (ITA); Mattia Cattaneo; Marco Frigo; Matteo Sobrero; Elisa Longo Borghini; Monica Trinca Colonel; Alessia Vigilia	Luxembourg (LUX); Liv Wenzel; Marie Schreiber; Nina Berton; Alex Kirsch; Mathieu Kockelmann; Mats Wenzel
European Road Cycling Championships; Slovenia 2–7 October 2026 (2026 summary)	Road race (Junior)	Azzurra Ballan (ITA)	Morgane Lestrade (FRA)	Klara Dworatzek (GER)
European Road Cycling Championships; Slovenia 2–7 October 2026 (2026 summary)	Individual time trial (Junior)	Alejandra Neira (ESP)	Laura Fivé (BEL)	Augustė Mikutytė (LTU)
European Road Cycling Championships; Slovenia 2–7 October 2026 (2026 summary)	Mixed relay (Junior)	Italy (ITA); Azzurra Ballan; Elisa Bianchi; Matilde Rossignoli; Enrico Andrea Balliana; Brandon Fedrizzi; Patrik Pezzo Rosola	Poland (POL); Agata Sekta; Kinga Słomka; Amelia Szymańska; Mateusz Błaszak; Igor Mitoraj; Mikołaj Legieć	Switzerland (SUI); Laurin Lingenhag; Gian Müller; Antoine Salamin; Joline Hunziker; Elia Marthe; Valentine Rousseaux
European Road Cycling Championships; Slovenia 2–7 October 2026 (2026 summary)	Road race (U23)	Mara Winter (SUI)	Nienke Vinke (NED)	Viktória Chladoňová (SVK)
European Road Cycling Championships; Slovenia 2–7 October 2026 (2026 summary)	Individual time trial (U23)	Nienke Vinke (NED)	Megan Arens (NED)	Viktória Chladoňová (SVK)

== Others ==
Championships	Race	Winner	Second	Third
2025 SEA Games; Thailand 10–19 December 2025 (2025 summary)	Road race	Jutatip Maneephan (THA)	Nur Aisyah Mohamad Zubir (MAS)	Ayustina Delia Priatna (INA)
2025 SEA Games; Thailand 10–19 December 2025 (2025 summary)	Criterium	Jutatip Maneephan (THA)	Nur Aisyah Mohamad Zubir (MAS)	Nguyễn Thị Thật (VIE)
2025 SEA Games; Thailand 10–19 December 2025 (2025 summary)	Individual time trial	Ayustina Delia Priatna (INA)	Phetdarin Somrat (THA)	Chaniporn Batriya (THA)
2026 South American Youth Games; Panama 16–18 April 2026 (2026 summary)	Road race	Estefanía Castillo (COL)	Valeria Vargas (COL)	Yasmin Ramos (BRA)
2026 South American Youth Games; Panama 16–18 April 2026 (2026 summary)	Individual time trial	Alexandra Osorio (CHI)	Valeria Vargas (COL)	Maitê Coelho da Silva (BRA)
2026 Asian Games; Japan 20–23 September 2026 (2026 summary)	Road race	Li Guo; China	Fariba Hashimi; Afghanistan	Leung Wing-yee; Hong Kong
2026 Asian Games; Japan 20–23 September 2026 (2026 summary)	Individual time trial	Rinata Sultanova; Kazakhstan	Zhang Hao; China	Shin Ji-eun; South Korea
