= 2024–25 UCI Gravel World Series =

Season of bicycle racing competition

- Fourth edition of the UCI Gravel World Series

Details
- Dates: 13 October 2024 – 21 September 2025
- Location: Italy; Australia; Spain; Brazil; Belgium; Portugal; Austria; Monaco; United States; Canada; South Africa; Netherlands; Great Britain; Germany; Poland; Denmark; Kenya; France; Luxembourg; Switzerland; Sweden; Namibia
- Races: 34

The 2024–25 UCI Gravel World Series was the 4th edition of UCI Gravel World Series. It was a season-long series of 34 gravel cycling events organized by the UCI that took place between 13 October 2024 and 21 September 2025. The top 25% riders in each category in each event qualified for that category in 2025 UCI Gravel World Championships.

== Calendar & results ==
In total there were 34 World Series events held during the season, including both the 2024 and 2025 editions of the European Gravel Championships.

#	Date	Race	Location	Longest Distance	Winner		Ref
#	Date	Race	Location	Longest Distance	Men	Women	Ref
1	13 October 2024	2024 UEC Gravel European Championships	(Italy) Asiago	153 km	Martin Stošek (CZE)	Sina Frei (SUI)	
2	27 October 2024	Gravelista	(Australia) Seymour	135 km	Brendan Johnston (AUS)	Talia Appleton (AUS)	
3	15 February 2025	Castellon Gravel Race	(Spain) Lucena del Cid	97 km	Alejandro Valverde (ESP)	Carolin Schiff (GER)	
4	9 March 2025	Gravel Brazil	(Brazil) Camboriú	111 km	Simon Pellaud (SUI)	Maddy Nutt (GBR)	
5	23 March 2025	Turnhout Gravel	(Belgium) Turnhout	144 km	Mads Würtz Schmidt (DEN)	Geerike Schreurs (NED)	
6	29 March 2025	114 Gravel Race	(Portugal) Elvas, (Spain) Badajoz	123 km	Matthew Holmes (GBR)	Lucía González Blanco (ESP)	
7	6 April 2025	Wörthersee Gravel Race	(Austria) Velden am Wörther See	146 km	Magnus Bak Klaris (DEN)	Geerike Schreurs (NED)	
8	20 April 2025	Monaco Gravel Race	Monaco	120 km	Mads Würtz Schmidt (DEN)	Morgan Aguirre (USA)	
9	25 April 2025	Giro Sardegna Gravel	(Italy) Siniscola	117.4 km	Tim Wollenberg (GER)	Debora Piana (ITA)	
10	26 April 2025	Highlands Gravel Classic	(United States) Fayetteville	109 km	Skyler Taylor (USA)	Crystal Anthony (USA)	
11	27 April 2025	Paris to Ancaster	(Canada) Ontario	110 km	Benjamin Perry (CAN)	Devon Clarke (CAN)	
12	3 May 2025	The Ceder	(South Africa) Nuwerust Cederberg	144 km	Félix Stehli (SUI)	Zanri Rossouw (RSA)	
13	10 May 2025	The Devils Cardigan	(Australia) Derby	106 km	Brendan Johnston (AUS)	Talia Appleton (AUS)	
14	11 May 2025	Marly Grav Race	(Netherlands) Valkenburg	155 km	Tim Wellens (BEL)	Lorena Wiebes (NED)	
15	17 May 2025	Seven	(Australia) Nannup	125 km	Mark O'Brien (AUS)	Tiffany Cromwell (AUS)	
16	17 May 2025	The Gralloch	(United Kingdom) Gatehouse of Fleet	110 km	Petr Vakoč (CZE)	Tessa Neefjes (NED)	
17	31 May 2025	3RIDES Gravel Race	(Germany) Aachen	123 km	Niels Vandeputte (BEL)	Marianne Vos (NED)	
18	7 June 2025	Gravel Adventure	(Poland) Szklarska Poręba	120 km	Adam Ťoupalík (CZE)	Hanna Nilsson (SWE)	
19	14 June 2025	Gravel Challenge Blaavands Huk	(Denmark) Blåvandshuk	130.4 km	Mads Würtz Schmidt (DEN)	Larissa Hartog (NED)	
20	14 June 2025	Safari Gravel Race	(Kenya) Hell's Gate	120 km	Lukas Malezsewski (BEL)	Haley Smith (USA)	
21	15 June 2025	Wish One Millau Grands Causses	(France) Millau	130 km	Dorian Godon (FRA)	Axelle Dubau-Prévot (FRA)	
22	21 June 2025	Eislek Gravel Luxembourg	(Luxembourg) Vianden	116.3 km	Mathijs Loman (NED)	Rosa Maria Klöser (GER)	
23	28 June 2025	Gravel Suisse	(Switzerland) Villars	104 km	Andreas Seewald (GER)	Sophie Wright (GBR)	
24	6 July 2025	Hegau Gravel Festival	(Germany) Singen	108 km	Mathijs Loman (NED)	Rosa Maria Klöser (GER)	
25	12 July 2025	Gravel One Fifty	(Netherlands) Roden	150 km	Jordan Habets (NED)	Femke Markus (NED)	
26	16 August 2025	Gravel Grit ’n Grind	(Sweden) Halmstad	146 km	Jordan Habets (NED)	Femke Markus (NED)	
27	23 August 2025	Monsterrando	(Italy) Fubine	120 km	Romain Bardet (FRA)	Erica Magnaldi (ITA)	
28	23 August 2025	Khomas100	(Namibia) Windhoek	157 km	Alex Miller (NAM)	Hayley Preen (RSA)	
29	30 August 2025	Houffa Gravel	(Belgium) Houffalize	141 km	Mads Würtz Schmidt (DEN)	Nicole Frain (AUS)	
30	6–7 September 2025	Graean Cymru	(United Kingdom) Ruthin	105 km	Jenson Young (GBR)	Noemie Thomson (GBR)	
31	13 September 2025	Mammoth TUFF	(United States) Mammoth Lakes	145 km	Caleb Bottcher (AUS)	Jennifer Tave (USA)	
32	13 September 2025	66 Degrés Sud - Pyrénées Catalanes Gravel Tour	(France) Les Angles	110 km	Romain Bardet (FRA)	Axelle Dubau-Prévot (FRA)	
33	20 September 2025	Sea Otter Europe Girona	(Spain) Girona	107 km	Daan Soete (BEL)	Nicole Frain (AUS)	
34	21 September 2025	2025 UEC Gravel European Championships	(Italy) Avezzano	148 km	Mads Würtz Schmidt (DEN)	Erica Magnaldi (ITA)	
