= Issi (disambiguation) =

ISSI or Issi may refer to:

- Ikatan Sepeda Seluruh Indonesia, Indonesia Cycling Federation
- Indonesia Sharia Stock Index
- International Space Science Institute
- International Society for Scientometrics and Informetrics
- Integrated Silicon Solution Inc.
- Issi saaneq, a species of sauropodomorph dinosaur
