= Noémie Abgrall =

French cyclist (born 1999)

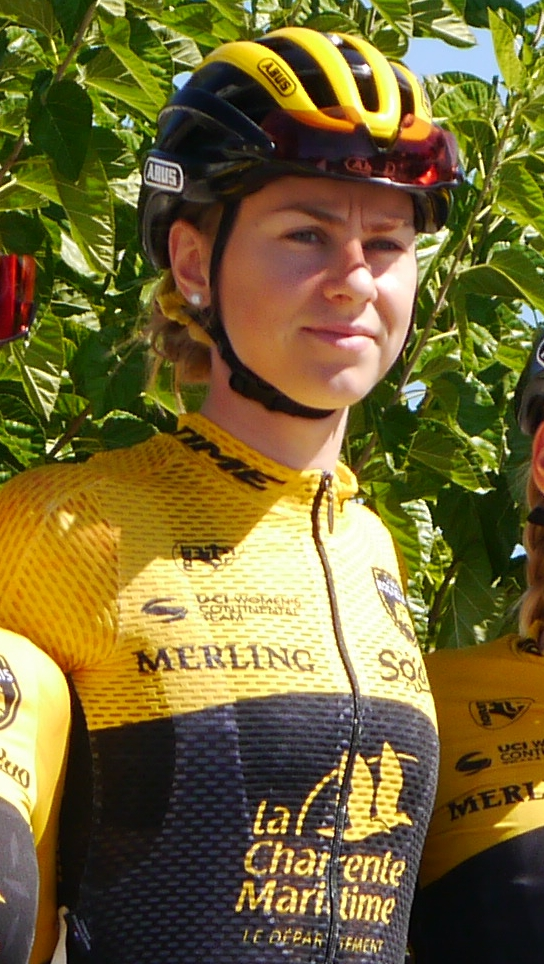

Personal information
- Full name: Noémie Abgrall
- Nickname: Nono
- Born: 1 December 1999 (age 26) Morlaix

Cycling career
- Sport: Cycling
- Current team: Ma Petite Entreprise
- Discipline: Road
- Role: Rider

Amateur teams
- 2017–2018: Breizh Ladies
- 2025: Ladynamips RVC

Professional teams
- 2019–2020: Charente-Maritime Women Cycling
- 2021: Stade Rochelais Charente-Maritime
- 2022-2023: Stade Rochelais Charente-Maritime
- 2024: Winspace
- 2026-2028: Ma Petite Entreprise

Major wins
- Championnat de France amateur 2025

Noémie Abgrall (born 1 December 1999) is a French racing cyclist. Abgrall turned professional in 2019 women's road cycling season, after two years with the amateur Breizh Ladies team.

== Professional career ==
In 2019, she joined the professional team Charente-Maritime Women Cycling, where she remained until 2020. That same year, she competed in her first UCI races and recorded two top-10 finishes at the French Under-23 Road Championships.

In 2020, she placed 10th in the time trial at the French National Championships.

In 2021, she stayed with the team, which became Stade Rochelais Charente-Maritime Women Cycling, and again achieved two top-10 finishes in the Under-23 category at the national championships.

In 2022, she obtained her first top-10 results in UCI-classified races. Noémie Abgrall finished 3rd at the French National Road Championships in Cholet in 2022. She came in behind Audrey Cordon-Ragot (1st) and Gladys Verhulst (2nd).

She also took part in the first edition of the Tour de France Femmes, held from 24 to 31 July 2022, between Paris and La Super Planche des Belles Filles (Haute-Saône). She did not complete the race.

In 2023, still with Stade Rochelais, several injuries disrupted her season.

Noémie Abgrall extends her contract with Stade Rochelais–Charente Maritime through 2024.

In 2024, she continued with the team, renamed Winspace Cycling Team following a new title sponsorship from the Chinese bicycle manufacturer Winspace. She primarily served as a domestique, supporting team leaders in mountainous stages. She completed the 2024 Vuelta Femenina in 71st place.

In 2025, she was not retained by the Winspace team and returned to the amateur ranks with Team Claris Automobiles Ladynamips RVC. She won the French National Amateur Road Championship at Mont des Alouettes, as well as the Classique Féminine du Val de Morteau and Les Reines de la Cise, and placed 3rd in the amateur national time trial championship and 5th overall at the Région Pays de la Loire Tour.

In 2026, she returned to professional racing with the newly created team Ma Petite Entreprise, signing a one-year contract. During the season, she took part in the Tour de France Femmes. At the end of the season, she extended her contract with the team for two additional years, through 2028.

== Major results ==
2016
3rd French National Junior Championships
4th Time trial, French National Junior Championships
5th Chrono des Nations Junior
2017
5th Time trial, French National Junior Championships
2020
10th Time trial, French National Championships
2022
3rd French National Championships
2023
8th Tour de Normandie
2025
1st French National Amateur Championships
1st Classique Féminine du Val de Morteau
1st Les Reines de la Cise
3rd Time trial, French National Amateur Championships
5th Région Pays de la Loire Tour
2026
5th Tour du Haut-Limousin féminin
8th La Périgord Ladies
9th La Pointe du Raz Ladies Classic
