= Maddy Nutt =

British cyclist

Maddy Nutt (born 19 March 1998) is a British gravel cyclist. She won the 2025 UCI Gravel World Series in Brazil and the Safari Gravel Race in 2024.

== Results ==
Year	Race	Result	Ref
2021	National Championships Great Britain WE - Road Race	DNF	
2022	UCI Gravel World Championships WE	29	
2022	National Championships Great Britain WE - Road Race	41	
2024	Safari Gravel Race	1	
2025	UCI Gavel World Series WE - Gravel Brazil	1	
2026	Utopia Gravel Fest	4	
2026	UCI Gravel World Series WE - 114 Gravel Race	9	
2026	UCI Gravel World Series WE - Gravel Brazil	3	

== Personal life ==
Nutt is neurodivergent and a member of the LGBTQ+ community.
