= Ma Petite Entreprise =

French cycling team

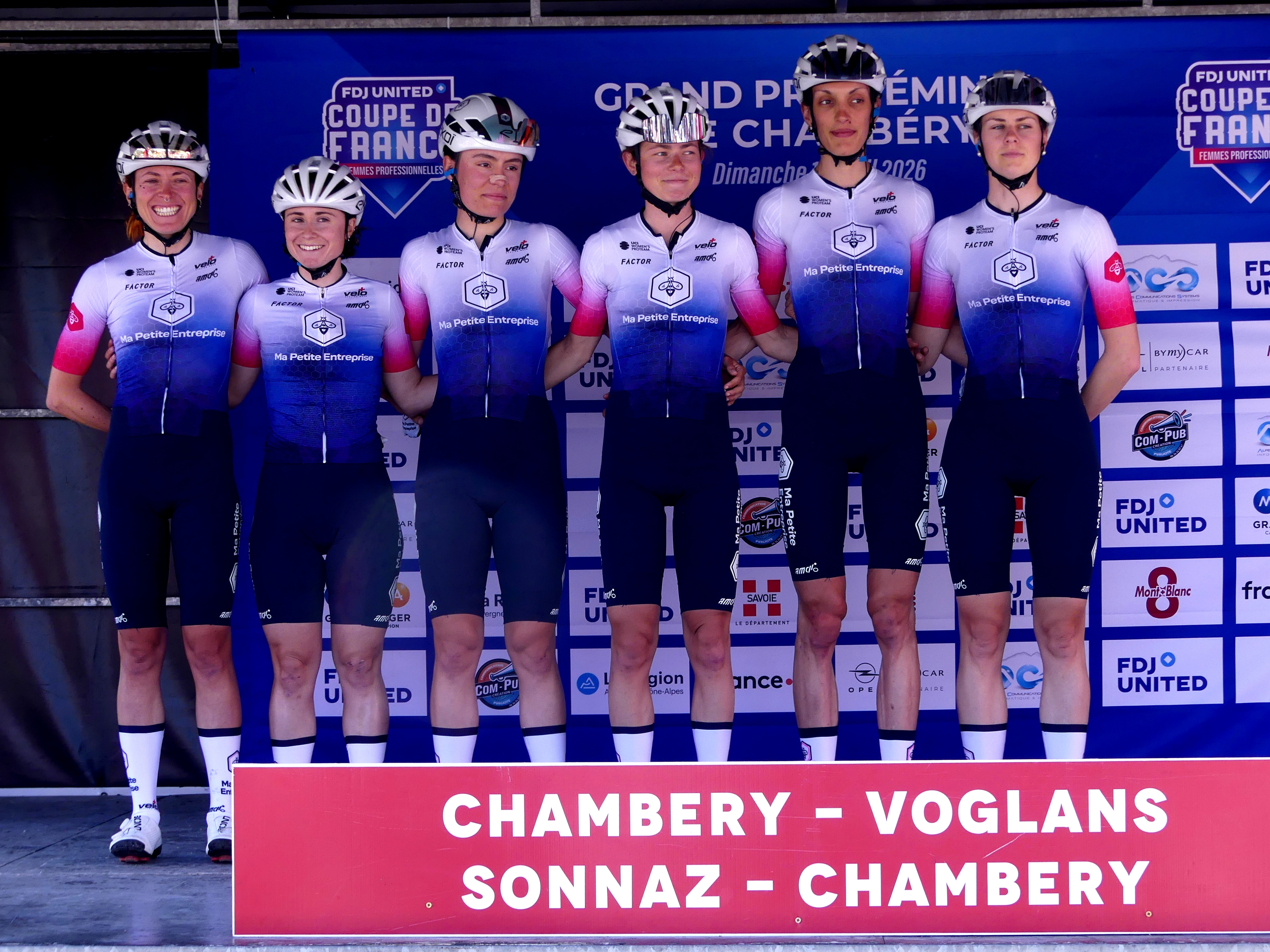
- Riders at the 2026 Grand Prix Féminin de Chambéry

Team information
- UCI code: MPE
- Registered: France
- Founded: 2026
- Discipline: Road
- Status: UCI Women's ProTeam

Team name history
- 2026–: Ma Petite Entreprise

Ma Petite Entreprise is a French women's road cycling team that was founded in 2026. The team holds UCI Women's ProTeam status, the second tier of professional women's teams.

The team has a unique sponsorship approach, using crowdfunding from over 650 small business to support the team.

== Team roster ==
As of 19 June 2026.

Rider	Date of birth
Noémie Abgrall (FRA)	1 December 1999 (age 26)
Laura Asencio (FRA)	14 May 1998 (age 28)
Alison Avoine (FRA)	5 January 2000 (age 26)
Morgane Coston (FRA)	28 December 1990 (age 35)
Clémence Latimier (FRA)	24 August 2003 (age 23)

Rider	Date of birth
Célia Le Mouël (FRA)	20 July 2000 (age 26)
Océane Mahé (FRA)	12 February 2002 (age 24)
Margot Marasco (FRA)	22 January 2005 (age 21)
Ilona Rouat (FRA)	30 May 2006 (age 20)
Léa Stern (SUI)	25 September 2001 (age 24)

== Major results ==
2026
Tour du Haut Limousin Féminin, Océane Mahé
