= Jazilla Mwamikazi =

Rwandan cyclist

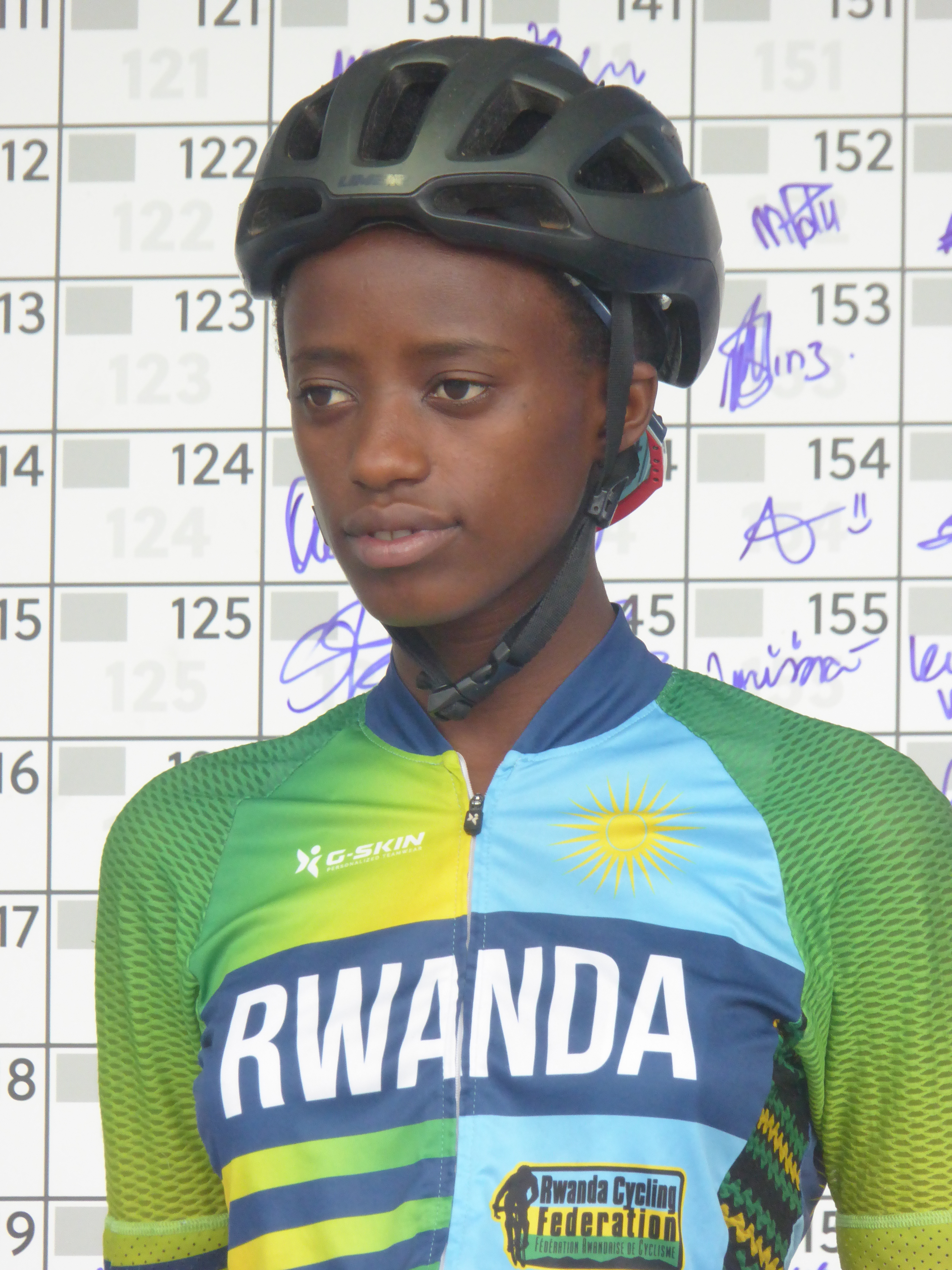
- Jazilla Mwamikazi (2023)

Personal information
- Born: 9 September 2004 (age 22) Rwamagana, Rwanda

Cycling career
- Sport: Cycling
- Current team: WCC Team
- Disciplines: Mountain biking, road
- Role: Rider

Professional teams
- 2025: WCC Team (stagiaire)
- 2026–: WCC Team

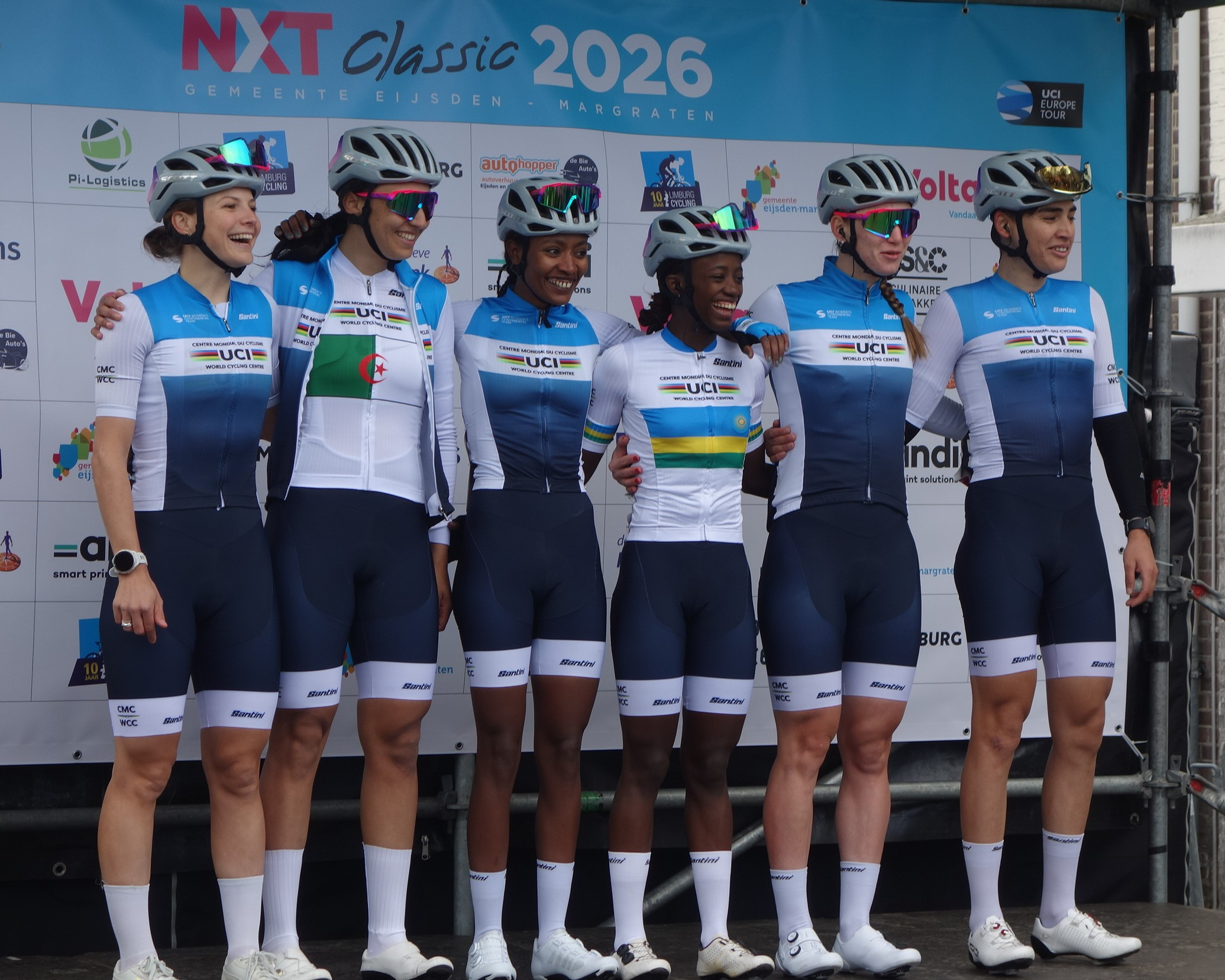
Mwamikazi as member of the 2026 WCC Team

Jazilla Mwamikazi (born 9 September 2004), also spelled Djazilla Umwamikazi, is a Rwandan road and mountain bike cyclist, who currently rides for UCI Women's Continental Team WCC Team.

== Career ==
Mwamikazi is from Rwamagana, a Rwandan cycling hub which has also produced Valens Ndayisenga and Joseph Areruya, and was introduced to cycling at a young age. After winning a number of local races, she competed in the 2022 Rwandan road championships, winning the junior women's titles in the individual time trial and road race. She was also selected for the national team and was able to train at the Africa Rising Cycling Center.

In spring 2023, Mwamikazi became Rwandan national champion in cross-country XCO. At the African Championships in Johannesburg, her first race outside Rwanda, she won the gold medal in the under-23 XCO event. In August of that year, she competed at the Road World Championships, where she did not finish the race.

In 2024, Mwamikazi won Rwanda's Race to Remember, a road race dedicated to the memory of the Rwandan genocide. At the African Mountain Bike Championships, she won two silver medals in the under-23 category, in cross-country XCO and short track XCC. Through an IOC wildcard, she received a place in the 2024 Olympic mountain bike race, where she finished 34th after being lapped. On the road, in the autumn she finished fourth in the elite road race at the 2024 African Road Cycling Championships, while also taking second place in the under-23 classification.

Alongside her racing, Mwamikazi leads a youth cycling team at her school in Rwamagana, helping younger female students find a pathway into cycling.

== Major results ==
2022
Rwandan National Champion (Junior) – Road race, Individual time trial
2023
Rwandan National Champion – Cross-country XCO
African Champion (U23) – Cross-country XCO
2024
(silver) African Mountain Bike Championships (U23) – Cross-country XCO, Short track XCC
(silver) African Road Cycling Championships (U23) – Road race
2025
Rwandan National Champion – Road race
Rwandan National Champion (U23) – Individual time trial
(silver) African Road Cycling Championships – Mixed relay
(silver) African Road Cycling Championships (U23) – Road race, Individual time trial
