= European Gravel Championships =

Annual road cycling championships

- The champion's jersey

Race details
- Region: Europe
- Discipline: Gravel

History
- First edition: 2023

The European Gravel Championships (Officially:UEC Gravel European Championships) are the set of European championship events for gravel races and have been regulated by the European Cycling Union since 2023. The championships are for Elite riders. Championships are open to riders selected by their national cycling governing body and they compete in the colours of their country. As with national championships and the World Championship, the winners are entitled to wear a special champion's jersey when racing throughout the year; in the case of the European Championship, a white jersey with blue bands and yellow stars, modelled on the flag of Europe, a symbolism and design adopted by both the Council of Europe and the European Union and widely used to represent the continent in sport.

== Editions ==
#	Year	Country	City	Category	Events
1	2023	Belgium	Oud-Heverlee	Elite	2
2	2024	Italy	Asiago	Elite	2
3	2025	Italy	Avezzano	Elite	2
4	2026	Belgium	Houffalize	Elite	2
5	2027	Finland	Lahti	Elite	2
6	2028	Denmark	Silkeborg	Elite	2

== Men's events ==
=== Men's elite gravel race ===
Year	Gold	Silver	Bronze
2023	Jasper Stuyven; Belgium	Tim Merlier; Belgium	Paul Voß; Germany
2024	Martin Stošek; Czech Republic	Toby Perry; Great Britain	Jenno Berckmoes; Belgium
2025	Mads Würtz Schmidt; Denmark	Anton Stensby; Norway	Hugo Drechou; France
2026	Mads Würtz Schmidt; Denmark	Wout Alleman; Belgium	Niels Vandeputte; Belgium

== Women's events ==
=== Women's elite gravel race ===
Year	Gold	Silver	Bronze
2023 (Note: The European Championship race served at the same time as a race of the UCI Gravel World Series in which non-European riders could compete. Australian Tiffany Cromwell won the latter race but was ineligible to compete in the European championship category.)	Lorena Wiebes; Netherlands	Fem van Empel; Netherlands	Elena Cecchini; Italy
2024	Sina Frei; Switzerland	Silvia Persico; Italy	Alice Maria Arzuffi; Italy
2025	Erica Magnaldi; Italy	Sophie Wright; Great Britain	Rosa Klöser; Germany
2026	Femke Markus; Netherlands	Shirin van Anrooij; Netherlands	Axelle Dubau-Prévot; France

== Medal table ==
Updated after the 2026 Championships

Rank	Nation	Gold	Silver	Bronze	Total
1	Netherlands	2	2	0	4
2	Denmark	2	0	0	2
3	Belgium	1	2	2	5
4	Italy	1	1	2	4
5	Czech Republic	1	0	0	1
5	Switzerland	1	0	0	1
7	Great Britain	0	2	0	2
8	Norway	0	1	0	1
9	France	0	0	2	2
9	Germany	0	0	2	2
Totals (10 entries)		8	8	8	24
