= Laura Asencio =

French cyclist

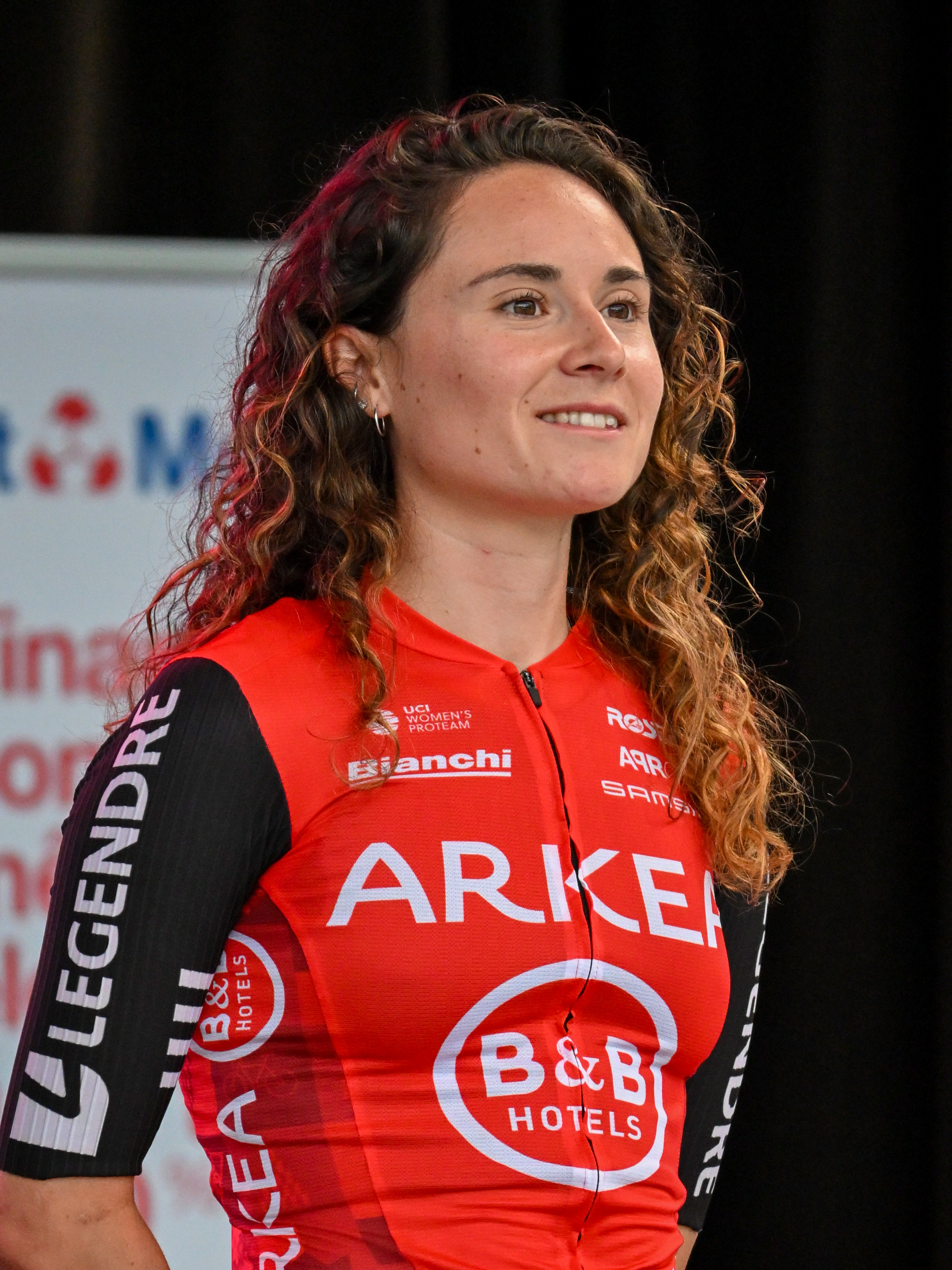
- Asencio at the 2025 Tour Cycliste Féminin International de l'Ardèche

Personal information
- Full name: Laura Asencio
- Born: 14 May 1998 (age 28) Valence, Drôme, France

Cycling career
- Sport: Cycling
- Current team: Ma Petite Entreprise
- Discipline: Road
- Role: Rider

Professional teams
- 2019–2024: WNT–Rotor Pro Cycling
- 2025: Arkéa–B&B Hotels Women
- 2026: Ma Petite Entreprise

Laura Asencio (born 14 May 1998) is a French professional racing cyclist, who currently rides for UCI Women's ProTeam Ma Petite Entreprise.

== Major results ==
2017
4th Road race, Jeux de la Francophonie
2018
5th Road race, UEC European Under-23 Road Championships
9th Grand Prix de Plumelec-Morbihan Dames
2020
National Under-23 Road Championships

1st Road race
5th Time trial

5th Vuelta a la Comunitat Valenciana Feminas
2021
3rd La Picto-Charentaise
