= Indonesian Cycling Federation =

National governing body of cycle racing in Indonesia

- Ikatan Sport Sepeda Indonesia
- Sport: Sport cycling
- Jurisdiction: National
- Abbreviation: ISSI
- Founded: 20 May 1956; 68 years ago
- Affiliation: UCI
- Regional affiliation: ACC
- Headquarters: Kebayoran Baru, Jakarta
- Chairman: Listyo Sigit Prabowo
- Secretary: Parama Nugroho

Official website
- icf.id
- (Indonesia)

The Indonesian Cycling Federation (ICF) (Indonesian: Ikatan Sport Sepeda Indonesia; abbreviated as ISSI) is the national governing body of cycle racing in Indonesia. It was founded right on the day of Indonesian National Awakening on May 20, 1956 in Semarang, Central Java.

ICF/ISSI is a member of the UCI and the ACC.
