= Rosa Klöser =

German cyclist

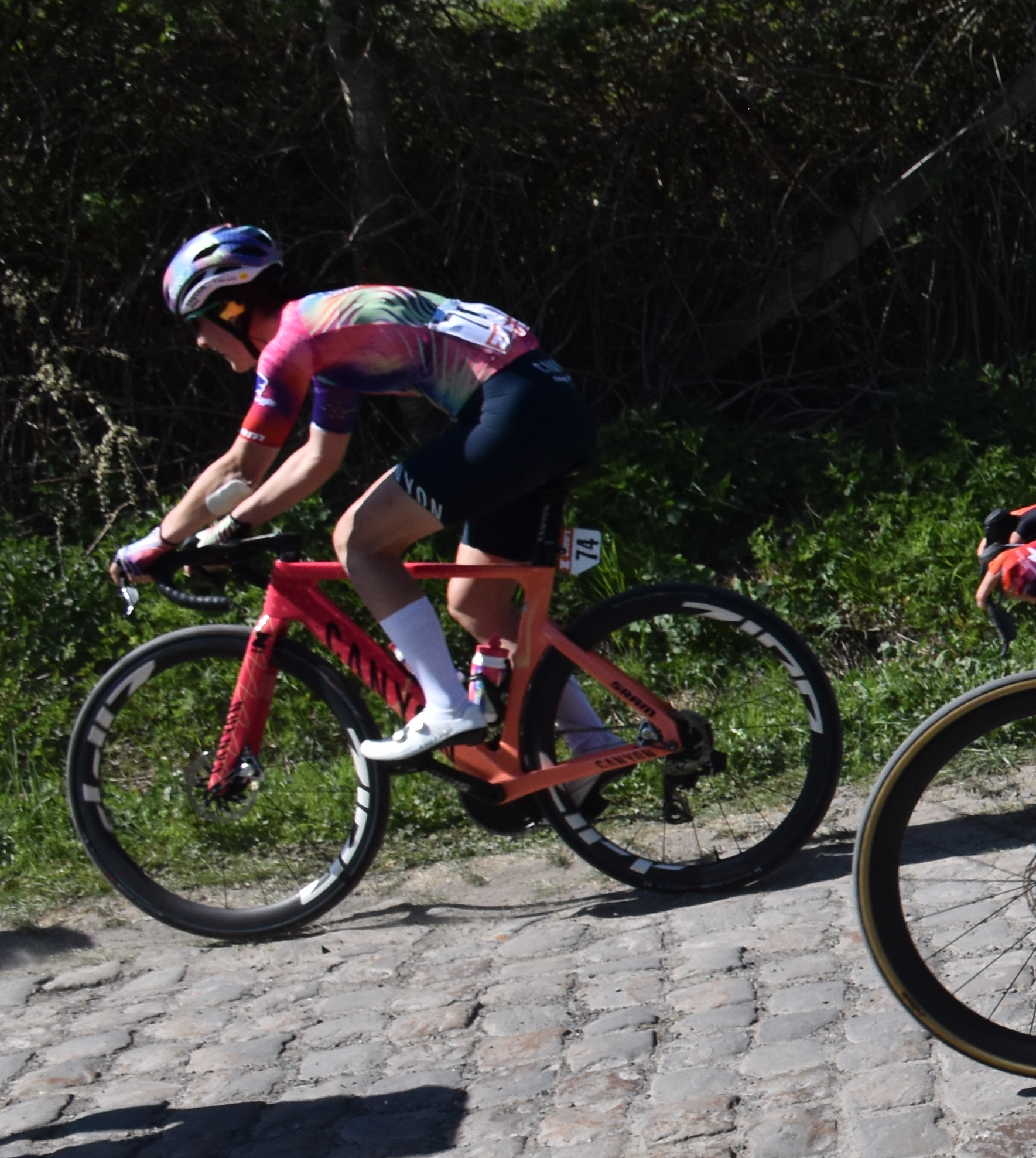
- Klöser at the 2025 Paris–Roubaix

Personal information
- Full name: Rosa Maria Klöser
- Born: 24 June 1996 (age 30) Geilenkirchen, Germany

Cycling career
- Sport: Cycling
- Current team: Canyon//SRAM
- Disciplines: Gravel; Road
- Role: Rider

Amateur teams
- 2022: Amager Cykle Ring
- 2023: ACR Women Elite
- 2024: MAAP x Rose Racing

Professional team
- 2025–: Canyon//SRAM Zondacrypto

Rosa Maria Klöser (born 14 June 1996) is a German professional gravel and road cyclist, who currently rides for UCI Women's WorldTeam Canyon//SRAM.

Klöser bought a road bike in 2020 after her commuter bike was stolen while living in Denmark, entering her first races in 2022. She won the Unbound Gravel 200 in 2024 in addition to several podium finishes at the 2023 and 2024 UCI Gravel World Series. These results landed her a contract with Canyon//SRAM Zondacrypto in 2025.

== Major results ==
2023
UCI Gravel World Series

3rd Millau Grands Causses
3rd Gravel, Grit 'n Grind
3rd La Monsterrato

2024
1st Unbound Gravel 200
UCI Gravel World Series

2nd 3RIDES
2nd Millau Grands Causses
3rd Gravel Adventure

3rd The Traka 200
5th European Gravel Championships
2025
2nd The Traka 200
3rd Overall Santa Vall
4th Unbound Gravel 200
