= Sophie Wright (cyclist) =

British cyclist

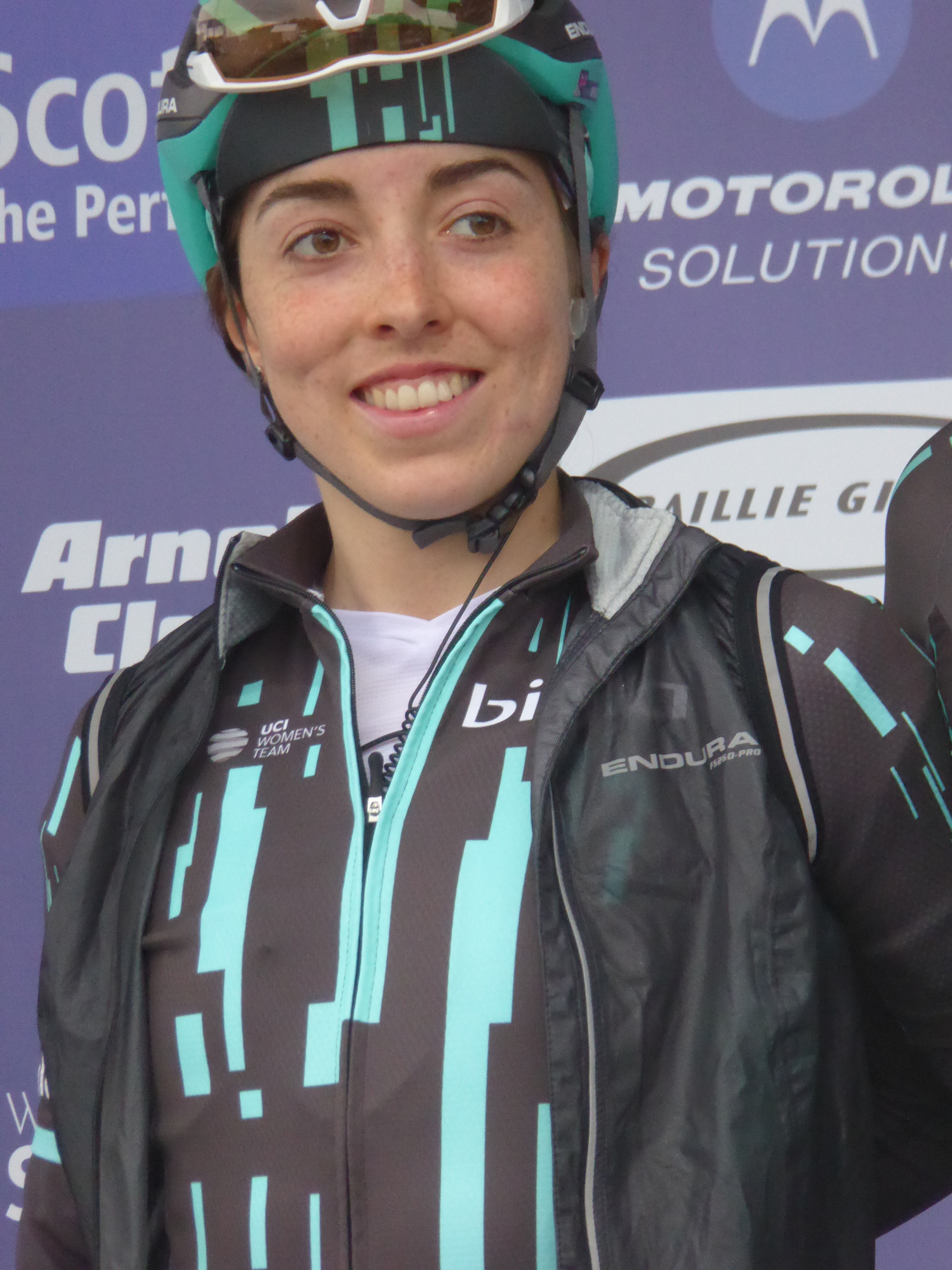
- Wright at the 2019 Women's Tour of Scotland

Personal information
- Full name: Sophie Kate Wright
- Born: 15 March 1999 (age 27) Norwich, England

Cycling career
- Sport: Cycling
- Current team: Ribble Outliers
- Disciplines: Road; Gravel; Mountain biking
- Role: Rider

Amateur teams
- 2017: Renvale Racing Team
- 2018: Torelli–Beastwear–Brother
- 2025–: Ribble Outliers

Professional teams
- 2018–2020: Cervélo–Bigla Pro Cycling
- 2021–2022: Alé BTC Ljubljana
- 2023–2024: Fenix–Deceuninck

Sophie Kate Wright (born 15 March 1999) is an English racing cyclist, who rides for British amateur team Ribble Outliers. Wright is a former junior national mountain biking champion and has represented Great Britain in the UCI Road World Championships.

== Early life ==
Wright grew up in Horsford in Norfolk. She attended Hellesdon High School.

== Career ==
In 2016 Wright won the junior women's cross-country mountain biking championship which was held in Sweden. Also in 2016, Wright finished in third place in the junior women's road race at the European Road Championships, finishing behind Liane Lippert and Elisa Balsamo.

In 2017 Wright underwent two heart surgeries to cure a condition that threatened to derail her career.

In 2018 Wright decided to concentrate on road cycling. She joined professional WorldTour team Cervélo–Bigla Pro Cycling and won the Tour of the Reservoir. She also rode in the women's road race event at the UCI Road World Championships held in Innsbruck, Austria.

For the 2021 season, Wright joined the Alé BTC Ljubljana team, following the disbandment of Équipe Paule Ka.

In 2024, Wright took part in the British National Road Race Championships. She attacked from the leading group with 10 kilometres (6.2 miles) to go, however suffered a puncture whilst in the lead and was unable to finish on the podium.

For the 2025 season, Wright joined Ribble Outliers, primarily competing in gravel cycling.
