= 2022 in women's road cycling =

2022 in women's road cycling is about the 2022 women's bicycle races ruled by the UCI and the 2022 UCI Women's Teams.

== World Championships ==
Race	Date	Cat. †	Winner	Second	Third	Ref
(Australia) UCI Road World Championships ITT	18 September 2022	WC	Ellen van Dijk (NED)	Grace Brown (AUS)	Marlen Reusser (SUI)	
(Australia) UCI Road World Championships ITT Junior	20 September 2022	WC	Zoe Bäckstedt (GBR)	Justyna Czapla (GER)	Febe Jooris (BEL)	
(Australia) UCI Road World Championships RR	24 September 2022	WC	Annemiek van Vleuten (NED)	Lotte Kopecky (BEL)	Silvia Persico (ITA)	
(Australia) UCI Road World Championships RR Junior	24 September 2022	WC	Zoe Bäckstedt (GBR)	Eglantine Rayer (FRA)	Nienke Vinke (NED)	
(Australia) UCI Road World Championships TTT	21 September 2022	WC	Switzerland (SUI); Marlen Reusser; Stefan Bissegger; Mauro Schmid; Nicole Koller; Elise Chabbey; Stefan Küng	Italy (ITA); Vittoria Guazzini; Elisa Longo Borghini; Matteo Sobrero; Elena Cecchini; Filippo Ganna; Edoardo Affini	Australia (AUS); Alexandra Manly; Luke Durbridge; Michael Matthews; Sarah Roy; Georgia Baker; Luke Plapp	

== UCI Women's ProSeries ==
Race	Date	Cat. †	Winner	Second	Third	Ref
(Belgium) Omloop Het Nieuwsblad	26 February 2022	1.Pro	Annemiek van Vleuten (NED)	Demi Vollering (NED)	Lorena Wiebes (NED)	
(Belgium) Nokere Koerse	16 March 2022	1.Pro	Lorena Wiebes (NED)	Lotte Kopecky (BEL)	Marta Bastianelli (ITA)	
(Belgium) Dwars door Vlaanderen	30 March 2022	1.Pro	Chiara Consonni (ITA)	Julie De Wilde (BEL)	Elise Chabbey (SUI)	
(Belgium) Brabantse Pijl	13 April 2022	1.Pro	Demi Vollering (NED)	Katarzyna Niewiadoma (POL)	Liane Lippert (GER)	
(Luxembourg) Festival Elsy Jacobs	29 April – 1 May 2022	2.Pro	Marta Bastianelli (ITA)	Veronica Ewers (USA)	Silvia Persico (ITA)	
(Germany) Thüringen Ladies Tour	24–29 May 2022	2.Pro	Alexandra Manly (AUS)	Marta Lach (POL)	Femke Gerritse (NED)	
(Switzerland) Tour de Suisse Women	18–21 June 2022	2.Pro	Lucinda Brand (NED)	Kristen Faulkner (USA)	Pauliena Rooijakkers (NED)	
(Italy) Giro dell'Emilia Internazionale Donne Elite	1 October 2022	1.Pro	Elisa Longo Borghini (ITA)	Veronica Ewers (USA)	Sofia Bertizzolo (ITA)	

== Single day races (1.1 and 1.2) ==
Race	Date	Cat. †	Winner	Second	Third	Ref
(Colombia) Junior Pan American Games	1 December 2021	1.2	Lina Hernández (COL)	Yareli Acevedo (MEX)	Erika Botero (COL)	
(Colombia) Junior Pan American Games	2 December 2021	1.2	Yareli Acevedo (MEX)	Erika Botero (COL)	Elizabeth Castaño (COL)	
(Spain) Vuelta CV Féminas	6 February 2022	1.1	Marta Bastianelli (ITA)	Ilaria Sanguineti (ITA)	Kathrin Schweinberger (AUT)	
(Turkey) Grand Prix Velo Manavgat	6 February 2022	1.2	Alina Moiseeva (RUS)	Diana Klimova (RUS)	Sofiya Karimova (UZB)	
(Turkey) Grand Prix Velo Alanya	19 February 2022	1.2	Viktoriia Yaroshenko (UKR)	Olga Shekel (UKR)	Manon Souyris (FRA)	
(Turkey) Grand Prix Justiniano Hotels	20 February 2022	1.2	Alina Moiseeva (RUS)	Valeria Valgonen (RUS)	Hanna Tserakh (BLR)	
(Belgium) Omloop van het Hageland	27 February 2022	1.1	Marta Bastianelli (ITA)	Emma Norsgaard (DEN)	Floortje Mackaij (NED)	
(Belgium) Le Samyn des Dames	1 March 2022	1.1	Emma Norsgaard (DEN)	Chiara Consonni (ITA)	Vittoria Guazzini (ITA)	
(Turkey) Grand Prix Gazipasa Women	5 March 2022	1.2	Olga Shekel (UKR)	Yuliia Biriukova (UKR)	Yanina Kuskova (UZB)	
(Turkey) Grand Prix Mediterranean	6 March 2022	1.2	Yanina Kuskova (UZB)	Yuliia Biriukova (UKR)	Anna Kulikova (UZB)	
(Italy) Trofeo Oro in Euro	6 March 2022	1.2	Sofia Bertizzolo (ITA)	Marta Lach (POL)	Silvia Zanardi (ITA)	
(Belgium) GP Oetingen	9 March 2022	1.1	Lorena Wiebes (NED)	Chiara Consonni (ITA)	Maria Giulia Confalonieri (ITA)	
(Netherlands) Drentse Acht van Westerveld	11 March 2022	1.2	Christine Majerus (LUX)	Alison Jackson (CAN)	Floortje Mackaij (NED)	
(Belgium) Scheldeprijs Vrouwen Elite	6 April 2022	1.1	Lorena Wiebes (NED)	Chiara Consonni (ITA)	Rachele Barbieri (ITA)	
(France) GP Féminin de Chambéry	17 April 2022	1.1	Brodie Chapman (AUS)	Victorie Guilman (FRA)	Cristina Tonetti (ITA)	
(Belgium) Ronde de Mouscron	18 April 2022	1.1	Thalita de Jong (NED)	Nicole Steigenga (NED)	Martina Alzini (ITA)	
(Netherlands) Omloop van Borsele	23 April 2022	1.1	Maaike Boogaard (NED)	Sofie van Rooijen (NED)	Nora Tveit (NOR)	
(Italy) Gran Premio della Liberazione	25 April 2022	1.2	Silvia Persico (ITA)	Chiara Consonni (ITA)	Maria Giulia Confalonieri (ITA)	
(Belgium) Leiedal Koerse	30 April 2022	1.2	Femke Markus (NED)	Nicole Steigenga (NED)	Mischa Bredewold (NED)	
(Belgium) GP Eco-Struct	7 May 2022	1.1	Charlotte Kool (NED)	Rachele Barbieri (ITA)	Lorena Wiebes (NED)	
(Spain) Gran Premio Ciudad de Eibar	8 May 2022	1.1	Olivia Baril (CAN)	Ane Santesteban (ESP)	Mavi García (ESP)	
(Spain) Emakumeen Nafarroako Klasikoa	10 May 2022	1.1	Sarah Gigante (AUS)	Veronica Ewers (USA)	Paula Patiño (COL)	
(Spain) Navarra Women's Elite Classics	11 May 2022	1.1	Veronica Ewers (USA)	Ane Santesteban (ESP)	Kristen Faulkner (USA)	
(France) La Classique Morbihan	13 May 2022	1.1	Antri Christoforou (CYP)	Coralie Demay (FRA)	Femke Markus (NED)	
(France) Grand Prix du Morbihan Féminin - Trophée Harmonie Mutuelle	14 May 2022	1.1	Ally Wollaston (NZL)	Vittoria Guazzini (ITA)	Grace Brown (AUS)	
(Netherlands) ZLM Omloop der Kempen Ladies	14 May 2022	1.2	Rachele Barbieri (ITA)	Sofie van Rooijen (NED)	Nina Kessler (NED)	
(Spain) Durango-Durango Emakumeen Saria	17 May 2022	1.1	Pauliena Rooijakkers (NED)	Veronica Ewers (USA)	Cecilie Uttrup Ludwig (DEN)	
(Netherlands) Arnhem–Veenendaal Classic	20 May 2022	1.1	Gladys Verhulst (FRA)	Karlijn Swinkels (NED)	Rachele Barbieri (ITA)	
Ladies Tour of Estonia	28 May 2022	1.2	Agnieszka Skalniak-Sójka (POL)	Kristel Sandra Soonik (EST)	Karolina Karasiewicz (POL)	
(France) Dwars door de Westhoek	5 June 2022	1.1	Chiara Consonni (ITA)	Sofie van Rooijen (NED)	Gaia Masetti (ITA)	
(Italy) Memorial Monica Bandini	5 June 2022	1.2	Silvia Persico (ITA)	Olga Shekel (UKR)	Olivia Baril (CAN)	
(France) Alpes Gresivaudan Classic	5 June 2022	1.2	Évita Muzic (FRA)	Eglantine Rayer (FRA)	Clara Koppenburg (GER)	
(Belgium) GP Mazda Schelkens	6 June 2022	1.2	Danique Braam (NED)	Marith Vanhove (BEL)	Marthe Truyen (BEL)	
(Belgium) Dwars door het Hageland	11 June 2022	1.1	Ilaria Sanguineti (ITA)	Christina Schweinberger (AUT)	Femke Markus (NED)	
(Belgium) Flanders Diamond Tour	12 June 2022	1.1	Chiara Consonni (ITA)	Marthe Truyen (BEL)	Georgia Danford (NZL)	
(France) Mont Ventoux Dénivelé Challenges	14 June 2022	1.2	Marta Cavalli (ITA)	Clara Koppenburg (GER)	Évita Muzic (FRA)	
(Belgium) Districtenpijl - Ekeren-Deurne	10 July 2022	1.1	Daria Pikulik (POL)	Nathalie Bex (BEL)	Marthe Truyen (BEL)	
Visegrad 4 Bicycle Race – GP Slovakia	23 July 2022	1.2	Ricarda Bauernfeind (GER)	Dominika Włodarczyk (POL)	Silvia Zanardi (ITA)	
Visegrad 4 Bicycle Race – Hungary	24 July 2022	1.2	Silvia Zanardi (ITA)	Monika Brzeźna (POL)	Agnieszka Skalniak-Sójka (POL)	
(France) La Périgord Ladies	13 August 2022	1.2	Grace Brown (AUS)	Simone Boilard (CAN)	Rachel Neylan (AUS)	
(France) La Picto–Charentaise	13 August 2022	1.2	Marie Le Net (FRA)	Skylar Schneider (USA)	Nathalie Eklund (SWE)	
(Belgium) Grote Prijs Yvonne Reynders	15 August 2022	1.2	Cancelled due bad weather conditions			
(Belgium) Konvert Kortrijk Koerse	19 August 2022	1.1	Julie De Wilde (BEL)	Susanne Meistrok (NED)	Silvia Persico (ITA)	
(Belgium) MerXem Classic	21 August 2022	1.1	Eleonora Gasparrini (ITA)	Megan Jastrab (USA)	Silvia Persico (ITA)	
(France) Kreiz Breizh Elites	25 August 2022	1.1	Emma Norsgaard (DEN)	Silvia Persico (ITA)	Marie Le Net (FRA)	
(Belgium) Grote Prijs Beerens	4 September 2022	1.1	Marjolein van 't Geloof (NED)	Jesse Vandenbulcke (BEL)	Marith Vanhove (BEL)	
A Travers les Hauts de France	10 September 2022	1.2	Mischa Bredewold (NED)	Marie-Morgane Le Deunff (FRA)	Yuliia Biriukova (UKR)	
(France) La Choralis Fourmies Féminine	11 September 2022	1.2	Clara Copponi (FRA)	Valentina Basilico (ITA)	Maria Martins (POR)	
(Belgium) Grand Prix de Wallonie	14 September 2022	1.2	Julie De Wilde (BEL)	Justine Ghekiere (BEL)	Yara Kastelijn (NED)	
(France) Grand Prix International d'Isbergues	18 September 2022	1.2	Chiara Consonni (ITA)	Clara Copponi (FRA)	Maria Giulia Confalonieri (ITA)	
(Paraguay) 2022 South American Games	3 October 2022	1.2	Agua Marina Espínola (PAR)	Lina Hernández (COL)	Lilibeth Chacón (VEN)	
(Belgium) Binche Chimay Binche pour Dames	4 October 2022	1.1	Lorena Wiebes (NED)	Marjolein van 't Geloof (NED)	Anniina Ahtosalo (FIN)	
(Italy) Tre Valli Varesine	4 October 2022	1.1	Elisa Longo Borghini (ITA)	Veronica Ewers (USA)	Ane Santesteban (ESP)	
(Paraguay) 2022 South American Games	5 October 2022	1.2	Jennifer Cesar (VEN)	Lina Hernández (COL)	Aranza Villalón (CHI)	
(Costa Rica) Elite Road Central American Championships (ITT)	14 October 2022	1.2	Milagro Mena (CRC)	Wendy Ducreux (PAN)	María Sánchez (CRC)	
(Costa Rica) Elite Road Central American Championships (ITT U23)	14 October 2022	1.2	Diandra Ramírez (CRC)	Dixiana Quesada (CRC)	Linda Menéndez (HON)	
(Costa Rica) Elite Road Central American Championships (RR)	15 October 2022	1.2	Milagro Mena (CRC)	Sauking Shi (ESA)	María Sánchez (CRC)	
(Costa Rica) Elite Road Central American Championships (RR U23)	15 October 2022	1.2	Dixiana Quesada (CRC)	Diandra Ramírez (CRC)	Linda Menéndez (HON)	
(France) Chrono des Nations	16 October 2022	1.1	Ellen van Dijk (NED)	Valeriya Kononenko (UKR)	Amber Neben (USA)	

== Stage races (2.1 and 2.2) ==
Race	Date	Cat. †	Winner	Second	Third	Ref
Tour of Thailand	8–10 December 2021	2.2	Chaniporn Batriya (THA)	Satinee Juntima (THA)	Jutatip Maneephan (THA)	
(Spain) Setmana Ciclista Valenciana	17–20 February 2022	2.1	Annemiek van Vleuten (NED)	Cecilie Uttrup Ludwig (DEN)	Marta Cavalli (ITA)	
(Netherlands) Bloeizone Fryslân Tour	3–5 March 2022	2.2	Ellen van Dijk (NED)	Riejanne Markus (NED)	Marlen Reusser (SUI)	
Tour of Thailand	8–10 April 2022	2.1	Phetdarin Somrat (THA)	Hannah Seeliger (AUS)	Siti Nur Adibah Akma (MAS)	
(United States) Tour of the Gila	27 April – 1 May 2022	2.2	Lauren De Crescenzo (USA)	Kristabel Doebel-Hickok (USA)	Austin Killips (USA)	
(Czech Republic) Gracia–Orlová	28 April – 1 May 2022	2.2	Agnieszka Skalniak-Sójka (POL)	Jenny Rissveds (SWE)	Christina Schweinberger (AUT)	
(Spain) Vuelta Ciclista Andalucia Ruta Del Sol	3–5 May 2022	2.1	Arlenis Sierra (CUB)	Mavi Garcia (ESP)	Ricarda Bauernfeind (GER)	
(France) Bretagne Ladies Tour	3–7 May 2022	2.1	Vittoria Guazzini (ITA)	Cédrine Kerbaol (FRA)	Ally Wollaston (NZL)	
(United States) Joe Martin Stage Race	19–22 May 2022	2.2	Emma Langley (USA)	Heidi Franz (USA)	Austin Killips (USA)	
Belgium Tour	28–30 June 2022	2.1	Agnieszka Skalniak-Sójka (POL)	Shari Bossuyt (BEL)	Ally Wollaston (NZL)	
(Belgium) BeNe Ladies Tour	13–17 July 2022	2.1	Ellen van Dijk (NED)	Lorena Wiebes (NED)	Audrey Cordon-Ragot (FRA)	
Vuelta Internacional Femenina a Costa Rica	14–17 July 2022	2.2	Jasmin Soto (GUA)	Jennifer Sánchez (COL)	Carolina Vargas (COL)	
(Poland) Anna Vasa Race	29–31 July 2022	2.2	Agnieszka Skalniak-Sójka (POL)	Olga Shekel (UKR)	Dominika Włodarczyk (POL)	
(Sweden) Tour of Uppsala	2–4 August 2022	2.1	Nathalie Eklund (SWE)	Mari Hole Mohr (NOR)	Stine Borgli (NOR)	
(France) CIC-Tour Féminin International des Pyrénées	5–7 August 2022	2.1	Kristabel Doebel-Hickok (USA)	Eri Yonamine (JPN)	Ricarda Bauernfeind (GER)	
Vuelta a Colombia Femenina	9–14 August 2022	2.2	Diana Peñuela (COL)	Lina Hernández (COL)	Anet Barrera (MEX)	
(Italy) Giro della Toscana Int. Femminile – Memorial Michela Fanini	25–28 August 2022	2.2	Agnieszka Skalniak-Sójka (POL)	Dominika Włodarczyk (POL)	Olga Shekel (UKR)	
(France) Tour Cycliste Féminin International de l'Ardèche	6–12 September 2022	2.1	Antonia Niedermaier (GER)	Loes Adegeest (NED)	Paula Patiño (COL)	
(Netherlands) Watersley Women's Challenge	9–11 September 2022	2.2	Dominika Włodarczyk (POL)	Ella Wyllie (NZL)	Lieke Nooijen (NED)	
(Belgium) AG Tour de la Semois	16–17 September 2022	2.2	Maria Giulia Confalonieri (ITA)	Mischa Bredewold (NED)	Eleonora Gasparrini (ITA)	
(Syria) International Syrian Tour	4–8 October 2022	2.2	Nesrine Houili (ALG)			

== Junior races (1.Ncup and 2.Ncup) ==
Race	Date	Cat. †	Winner	Second	Third	Ref
(Italy) Piccolo Trofeo Alfredo Binda	20 March 2022	1.Ncup	Francesca Pellegrini (ITA)	Michela De Grandis (ITA)	Laura Ruíz (ESP)	
(Belgium) Gent-Wevelgem	27 March 2022	1.Ncup	Nienke Veenhoven (NED)	Laura Lizette Sander (EST)	Maurène Trégouet (FRA)	
(Netherlands) Omloop van Borsele	22–24 March 2022	1.Ncup	Zoe Bäckstedt (GBR)	Izzy Sharp (GBR)	Anna van der Meiden (NED)	
(France) Tour du Gévaudan Occitanie femmes	7–8 May 2022	2.Ncup	Eglantine Rayer (FRA)	Julie Bego (FRA)	Daniela Schmidsberger (AUT)	
(France) Grand Prix CERATIZIT	27 August 2022	1.1	Emma Jeffers (GBR)	Matilda McKibben (GBR)	Marion Bunel (FRA)	
(Spain) Bizkaikoloreak	27–28 August 2022	2.Ncup	Nienke Vinke (NED)	Alizée Rigaux (FRA)	Eglantine Rayer (FRA)	
(Netherlands) Watersley Ladies Challenge	9–11 September 2022	2.Ncup	Zoe Bäckstedt (GBR)	Julia Kopecky (CZE)	Justyna Czapla (GER)	
(France) Chrono des Nations	16 October 2022	2.Ncup	Eglantine Rayer (FRA)	Aurore Pernollet (FRA)	Clémence Chereau (FRA)	

== Other ==
Race	Date	Cat. †	Winner	Second	Third	Ref
(Vietnam) 2021 Southeast Asian Games (Criterium)	14 – 22 May 2022	—	Jutatip Maneephan; Thailand	Nguyễn Thị Thật; Vietnam	Nur Aisyah Mohamad Zubir; Malaysia	
(Vietnam) 2021 Southeast Asian Games (ITT)	14 – 22 May 2022	—	Ayustina Delia Priatna; Indonesia	Luo Yiwei; Singapore	Phetdarin Somrat; Thailand	
(Vietnam) 2021 Southeast Asian Games (RR)	14 – 22 May 2022	—	Nguyễn Thị Thật; Vietnam	Nur Aisyah Mohamad Zubir; Malaysia	Ayustina Delia Priatna; Indonesia	
(Colombia) 2022 Bolivarian Games	24 June – 2 July 2022	—	Miryam Núñez; Ecuador	Sérika Gulumá; Colombia	Lilibeth Chacón; Venezuela	
(Colombia) 2022 Bolivarian Games	24 June – 2 July 2022	—	Aranza Villalón; Chile	Miryam Núñez; Ecuador	Ana Cristina Sanabria; Colombia	
(Algeria) 2022 Mediterranean Games	30 June 2022	—	Vittoria Guazzini; Italy	Eugenia Bujak; Slovenia	Cédrine Kerbaol; France	
(Algeria) 2022 Mediterranean Games	2 July 2022	—	Barbara Guarischi; Italy	Daniela Campos; Portugal	Sandra Alonso; Spain	
(England) 2022 Commonwealth Games	4 August 2022	—	Grace Brown; Australia	Anna Henderson; England	Georgia Williams; New Zealand	
(England) 2022 Commonwealth Games	7 August 2022	—	Georgia Baker; Australia	Neah Evans; Scotland	Sarah Roy; Australia	

== Continental Championships ==
Championships	Race	Winner	Second	Third
African Road Championships; Egypt 23–27 March (2022 summary)	Road race	Ebtissam Mohamed (EGY)	Kimberley Le Court (MRI)	Awa Bamogo (BUR)
African Road Championships; Egypt 23–27 March (2022 summary)	Individual time trial	Nesrine Houili (ALG)	Ebtissam Mohamed (EGY)	Kerry Jonker (RSA)
African Road Championships; Egypt 23–27 March (2022 summary)	Road race (Junior)	Caitlin Thompson (RSA)	Romna Guesh (ERI)	Aline Uwera (RWA)
African Road Championships; Egypt 23–27 March (2022 summary)	Individual time trial (Junior)	Caitlin Thompson (RSA)	Raja Chakir (MAR)	Saron Tekle (ERI)
African Road Championships; Egypt 23–27 March (2022 summary)	Team Time Trial	Eritrea (ERI); Monalisa Araya; Milena Fafiet; Adiam Dawit; Danait Fitsum	Mauritius (MRI); Raphaëlle Lamusse; Llucie de Marigny-Lagesse; Celia Halbwachs; Kimberley Le Court	Egypt (EGY); Ebtissam Mohamed; Nada Aboubalash; Hapepa Eliwa; Rehab El Sherbini
African Road Championships; Egypt 23–27 March (2022 summary)	Mixed Team Time Trial	Mauritius (MRI); Kimberley Le Court; Christopher Lagane; Llucie de Marigny-Lagesse; Raphaëlle Lamusse; Alexandre Mayer; Aurélien de Comarmond	Eritrea (ERI); Milena Fafiet; Mikiel Habtom; Dawit Yemane; Monalisa Araya; Aklilu Gebrehiwet; Feven Haile	Egypt (EGY); Assem Khalil; Rehab El Sherbini; Ebtissam Mohamed; Youssef Abouelhassan; Hapepa Eliwa; Ahmed Saad
African Road Championships; Egypt 23–27 March (2022 summary)	Junior Team Time Trial	Eritrea (ERI)	Morocco (MAR)	Egypt (EGY)
Asian Cycling Championships; Tajikistan (2022 summary)	Road race	Nguyễn Thị Thật (VIE)	Makhabbat Umutzhanova (KAZ)	Akpeiil Ossim (KAZ)
Asian Cycling Championships; Tajikistan (2022 summary)	Individual time trial	Rinata Sultanova (KAZ)	Agustina Delia Priatna (INA)	Tserenlkham Solongo (MGL)
Asian Cycling Championships; Tajikistan (2022 summary)	Team Time Trial	Uzbekistan (UZB); Margarita Misyurina; Anna Kulikova; Yanina Kuskova; Shaknoza Abdullaeva	Kazakhstan (KAZ); Rinata Sultanova; Faina Potapova; Makhabbat Umutzhanova; Anzhela Solovyeva	Iran (IRI); Somayeh Yazdani; Mandana Dehghan; Reyhaneh Khatouni; Saeideh Sayahian
Asian Cycling Championships; Tajikistan (2022 summary)	Individual time trial (U23)	Yanina Kuskova (UZB)	Bota Batyrbekova (KAZ)	Safia Al Sayegh (UAE)
Asian Cycling Championships; Tajikistan (2022 summary)	Road race (Junior)	Sofiya Karimova (UZB)	Alina Spirina (KAZ)	Dariya Kazakbay (KAZ)
Asian Cycling Championships; Tajikistan (2022 summary)	Individual time trial (Junior)	Anna Kuskova (UZB)	Dariya Kazakbay (KAZ)	Thi Be Hong Nguyen (VIE)
Oceanian Cycling Championships; Australia (2022 summary)	Road race	Josie Talbot (AUS)	Danielle de Francesco (AUS)	Amber Pate (AUS)
Oceanian Cycling Championships; Australia (2022 summary)	Individual time trial	Georgie Howe (AUS)	Amber Pate (AUS)	Anna Davis (AUS)
Oceanian Cycling Championships; Australia (2022 summary)	Road race (U23)	Ella Wyllie (NZL)	Anya Louw (AUS)	Annamarie Lipp (NZL)
Oceanian Cycling Championships; Australia (2022 summary)	Individual time trial (U23)	Anya Louw (AUS)	Kimberly Cadzow (NZL)	Alyssa Polites (AUS)
Oceanian Cycling Championships; Australia (2022 summary)	Road race (Junior)	Belinda Bailey (AUS)	Bronte Stewart (AUS)	Mackenzie Coupland (AUS)
Oceanian Cycling Championships; Australia (2022 summary)	Individual time trial (Junior)	Isabelle Carnes (AUS)	Sophie Marr (AUS)	Bronte Stewart (AUS)
South American Cycling Championships; Argentina (2022 summary)	Road race	Arlenis Sierra (CUB)	Catalina Soto (CHI)	Fabiana Granizal (URU)
South American Cycling Championships; Argentina (2022 summary)	Individual time trial	Lilibeth Chacón (VEN)	Lina Hernández (COL)	Antonella Leonardi (ARG)
UEC Road Juniors & U23 European Championships; Portugal (2022 summary)	Road race (U23)	Shirin van Anrooij (NED)	Vittoria Guazzini (ITA)	Fem van Empel (NED)
UEC Road Juniors & U23 European Championships; Portugal (2022 summary)	Road race (Junior)	Eglantine Rayer (FRA)	Eleonora Ciabocco (ITA)	Federica Venturelli (ITA)
UEC Road Juniors & U23 European Championships; Portugal (2022 summary)	Individual time trial (U23)	Shirin van Anrooij (NED)	Vittoria Guazzini (ITA)	Marie Le Net (FRA)
UEC Road Juniors & U23 European Championships; Portugal (2022 summary)	Individual time trial (Junior)	Justyna Czapla (GER)	Eglantine Rayer (FRA)	Febe Jooris (BEL)
UEC Road Juniors & U23 European Championships; Portugal (2022 summary)	Mixed time trial (U23)	Germany (GER); Ricarda Bauernfeind; Maurice Ballerstedt; Linda Riedmann; Tobias Buck-Gramcko	Switzerland (SUI); Jasmin Liechti; Fabio Christen; Annika Liehner; Arnaud Tendon	Netherlands (NED); Lars Boven; Femke Gerritse; Tim Marsman; Mischa Bredewold
UEC Road Juniors & U23 European Championships; Portugal (2022 summary)	Mixed time trial (Junior)	Italy (ITA); Alice Toniolli; Nicolas Milesi; Valentina Zanzi; Alessandro Cattani	Germany (GER); Fabian Wünstel; Hannah Kunz; Louis Leidert; Jette Simon	Estonia (EST); Elisabeth Ebras; Oliver Rüster; Laura Lizette Sander; Lauri Tamm

== Teams ==
UCI Women's WorldTeams
Canyon//SRAM–
EF Education–Tibco–SVB–
FDJ Suez Futuroscope
Human Powered Health–
Team Jumbo–Visma–
Liv Racing Xstra
Movistar Team
Roland Cogeas Edelweiss Squad–
SD Worx
Team BikeExchange–Jayco
Team DSM
Trek–Segafredo
UAE Team ADQ
Uno-X Pro Cycling Team
UCI Women's Continental Teams
A.R. Monex
Andy Schleck–CP NVST–Immo Losch
Arkéa Pro Cycling Team
Aromitalia–Basso Bikes–Vaiano
AWOL O'Shea
Bepink
Bingoal Casino–Chevalmeire–Van Eyck Sport
Bizkaia–Durango
Born to Win G20 Ambedo
CAMS–Basso
Ceratizit–WNT Pro Cycling
China Liv Pro Cycling
Plantur–Pura
DNA Pro Cycling
Le Col–Wahoo
Eneicat–RBH Global–Martín Villa
CCN Factory Racing
GT Krush Tunap
InstaFund Racing
Isolmant–Premac–Vittoria
Laboral Kutxa–Fundación Euskadi
Lotto–Soudal Ladies
Lviv Cycling Team
Emotional.fr–Tornatech–GSC Blagnac
Massi–Tactic
Minsk Cycling Club
Multum Accountants Ladies
AG Insurance–NXTG
Parkhotel Valkenburg
Río Miera–Cantabria Deporte
Roxsolt Liv SRAM
Servetto–Makhymo–Beltrami TSA
Sestroretsk
Sopela Women's Team
Stade Rochelais Charente-Maritime
Team Farto–BTC
Team Coop–Hitec Products
Team Illuminate
IBCT
Top Girls Fassa Bortolo
Valcar–Travel & Service
WCC Team
