= 2022 UCI Road World Championships – Women's junior road race =

Cycling event

Women's junior road race
2022 UCI Road World Championships

Race details
- Dates: 24 September 2022
- Distance: 67.2 km (41.76 mi)
- Winning time: 1:47:05

Medalists
	Gold	Zoe Bäckstedt (GBR)
	Silver	Eglantine Rayer (FRA)
	Bronze	Nienke Vinke (NED)

The women's junior road race of the 2022 UCI Road World Championships was a cycling event that took place on 23 September 2022 in Wollongong, Australia.

== Final classification ==
Of the race's 72 entrants, 57 riders completed the full distance of 67.2 kilometres (41.8 mi).

Rank	Rider	Country	Time	Behind
1st place, gold medalist(s)	Zoe Bäckstedt	Great Britain	1:47:05	+0
2nd place, silver medalist(s)	Eglantine Rayer	France	1:49:12	+2:07
3rd place, bronze medalist(s)	Nienke Vinke	Netherlands	1:49:12	+2:07
4	Francesca Pellegrini	Italy	1:49:24	+2:19
5	Maho Kakita	Japan	1:49:26	+2:21
6	Malwina Mul	Poland	1:49:26	+2:21
7	Julia Kopecky	Czech Republic	1:49:26	+2:21
8	Eleonora Ciabocco	Italy	1:49:26	+2:21
9	Xaydee van Sinaey	Belgium	1:49:26	+2:21
10	Alizee Rigaux	France	1:49:26	+2:21
11	Noelle Ruetschi	Switzerland	1:49:26	+2:21
12	Fleur Moors	Belgium	1:49:26	+2:21
13	Daniela Schmidsberger	Austria	1:49:26	+2:21
14	Jette Simon	Germany	1:49:26	+2:21
15	Justyna Czapla	Germany	1:49:26	+2:21
16	Awen Roberts	Great Britain	1:49:26	+2:21
17	Bonnie Rattray	New Zealand	1:49:26	+2:21
18	Febe Jooris	Belgium	1:49:51	+2:46
19	Babette van der Wolf	Netherlands	1:49:51	+2:46
20	Jade Linthoudt	Belgium	1:49:51	+2:46
21	Talia Appleton	Australia	1:49:51	+2:46
22	Anna van den Meiden	Netherlands	1:49:51	+2:46
23	Gaia Segato	Italy	1:49:51	+2:46
24	Elisabeth Ebras	Estonia	1:49:51	+2:46
25	Rosita Reijnhout	Netherlands	1:49:51	+2:46
26	Samantha Scott	United States	1:49:51	+2:46
27	Julie Bego	France	1:49:51	+2:46
28	Bronte Stewart	Australia	1:49:51	+2:46
29	Eliška Kvasničková	Czech Republic	1:50:32	+3:27
30	Lise Menage	France	1:50:36	+3:31
31	Grace Lister	Great Britain	1:51:01	+3:56
32	Titia Ryo	France	1:51:03	+3:58
33	Jule Markl	Germany	1:52:11	+5:06
34	Chloe Patrick	United States	1:53:09	+6:04
35	Lucia Ruiz Pérez	Spain	1:53:09	+6:04
36	Fiona Zimmermann	Switzerland	1:53:09	+6:04
37	Isabel Sharp	Great Britain	1:53:27	+6:22
38	Lucy Stewart	Australia	1:53:27	+6:22
39	Katherine Sarkisov	United States	1:53:27	+6:22
40	Federica Venturelli	Italy	1:53:27	+6:22
41	Eloise Camire	Canada	1:53:27	+6:22
42	Hannah Kunz	Germany	1:53:27	+6:22
43	Isabelle Carnes	Australia	1:53:27	+6:22
44	Violetta Kazakova	Kazakhstan	1:53:27	+6:22
45	Anabelle Thomas	Canada	1:53:27	+6:22
46	Wilma Aintila	Finland	1:53:27	+6:22
47	Alice Toniolli	Italy	1:53:27	+6:22
48	Laura Lizette Sander	Estonia	1:53:31	+6:26
49	Laura Ruiz Pérez	Spain	1:54:43	+7:38
50	Angie Londono Posada	Colombia	1:55:31	+8:26
51	Arabella Tuck	New Zealand	1:55:38	+8:33
52	Belinda Bailey	Australia	1:55:42	+8:37
53	Lucia Garcia Muñoz	Spain	1:55:42	+8:37
54	Makala Jaramillo	United States	1:55:43	+8:38
55	Seana Littbarski-Gray	Germany		
56	Nataliia Safroniuk	Ukraine		
57	Kiara Lylyk	Canada	1:59:42	+12:37

Rank	Rider	Country	Time	Behind
	Ayana Mizutani	Japan	Did not finish	
	Amelia Sykes	New Zealand	Did not finish	
	Penelope Primeau	Canada	Did not finish	
	Paula Barrios Riveros	Colombia	Did not finish	
	Almudena Morales	Spain	Did not finish	
	Mirre Knaven	Netherlands	Did not finish	
	Alina Spirin	Kazakhstan	Did not finish	
	Muireann Green	New Zealand	Did not finish	
	Viktoriya Marchuk	Kazakhstan	Did not finish	
	Milana Kotelnikova	Kazakhstan	Did not finish	
	Rachel Seaman	South Africa	Did not finish	
	Caitlin Thompson	South Africa	Did not finish	
	Tarina Naude	South Africa	Did not finish	
	Maryam Ali	Pakistan	Did not finish	
	Raja Chakir	Morocco	Did not finish	
