= 2022 UCI Road World Championships – Women's junior time trial =

Cycling event

Women's junior time trial
2022 UCI Road World Championships

Race details
- Dates: 20 September 2022
- Distance: 14.1 km (8.761 mi)
- Winning time: 18:26.78

Medalists
	Gold	Zoe Bäckstedt (GBR)
	Silver	Justyna Czapla (GER)
	Bronze	Febe Jooris (BEL)

The women's junior time trial of the 2022 UCI Road World Championships was a cycling event that took place on 20 September 2022 in Wollongong, Australia.

== Final classification ==
Rank	Rider	Time	Behind
1st place, gold medalist(s)	(United Kingdom) Zoe Bäckstedt (GBR)	18:26.78	
2nd place, silver medalist(s)	(Germany) Justyna Czapla (GER)	20:02.36	+1:35.58
3rd place, bronze medalist(s)	(Belgium) Febe Jooris (BEL)	20:15.76	+1:48.98
4	(Czech Republic) Eliška Kvasničková (CZE)	20:16.09	+1:49.31
5	(Netherlands) Anna van der Meiden (NED)	20:16.92	+1:50.14
6	(Estonia) Elisabeth Ebras (EST)	20:17.65	+1:50.87
7	(Netherlands) Nienke Vinke (NED)	20:18.34	+1:51.56
8	(Australia) Isabelle Carnes (AUS)	20:21.33	+1:54.55
9	(Estonia) Laura Lizette Sander (EST)	20:26.95	+2:00.17
10	(United Kingdom) Isabel Sharp (GBR)	20:31.65	+2:04.87
11	(Germany) Hannah Kunz (GER)	20:32.96	+2:06.18
12	(Finland) Wilma Aintila (FIN)	20:36.66	+2:09.88
13	(Japan) Maho Kakita (JPN)	20:39.41	+2:12.63
14	(Germany) Jette Simon (GER)	20:41.68	+2:14.90
15	(Italy) Alice Toniolli (ITA)	20:48.19	+2:21.41
16	(France) Églantine Rayer (FRA)	20:53.96	+2:27.18
17	(Australia) Bronte Stewart (AUS)	20:57.10	+2:30.32
18	(Switzerland) Fiona Zimmermann (SUI)	20:58.72	+2:31.94
19	(New Zealand) Amelia Sykes (NZL)	20:59.92	+2:33.14
20	(Austria) Daniela Schmidsberger (AUT)	21:06.18	+2:39.40
21	(Australia) Lucy Stewart (AUS)	21:09.11	+2:42.33
22	(Canada) Pénélope Primeau (CAN)	21:16.10	+2:49.32
23	(Belgium) Xaydee van Sinaey (BEL)	21:21.15	+2:54.37
24	(Italy) Federica Venturelli (ITA)	21:26.36	+2:59.58
25	(Kazakhstan) Violetta Kazakova (KAZ)	21:37.75	+3:10.97
26	(United States) Chloe Patrick (USA)	21:38.92	+3:12.14
27	(United States) Katherine Sarkisov (USA)	21:46.03	+3:19.25
28	(Canada) Eloise Camire (CAN)	21:50.36	+3:23.58
29	(New Zealand) Arabella Tuck (NZL)	21:57.53	+3:30.75
30	(Colombia) Angie Londono (COL)	22:24.35	+3:57.57
31	(Kazakhstan) Alina Spirina (KAZ)	22:34.39	+4:07.61
32	(South Africa) Caitlin Thompson (RSA)	22:56.42	+4:29.64
33	(Spain) Lucía García Muñoz (ESP)	22:59.41	+4:32.63
34	(Spain) Almudena Morales Perez (ESP)	22:59.99	+4:33.21
35	(Ukraine) Nataliia Safroniuk (UKR)	23:02.42	+4:35.64
36	(South Africa) Rachel Seaman (RSA)	23:48.52	+5:21.74
37	(Pakistan) Maryam Ali (PAK)	26:18.17	+7:51.39
