= 2026 Tour de Suisse Women =

2026 UCI Women's World Tour, race 21 of 26

Race details
- Dates: 17–21 June 2026
- Stages: 5
- Distance: 459.8 km (285.7 mi)
- Winning time: 11h 58' 35"

Results
	Winner	Marlen Reusser (SWI)	(Movistar Team)
	Second	Cédrine Kerbaol (FRA)	(EF Education–Oatly)
	Third	Katarzyna Niewiadoma-Phinney (POL)	(Canyon//SRAM)
	Points	Marlen Reusser (SWI)	(Movistar Team)
	Mountains	Femke de Vries (NED)	(Visma–Lease a Bike)
	Young rider	Cédrine Kerbaol (FRA)	(EF Education–Oatly)
	Team	(Belgium) AG Insurance–Soudal	

The 2026 Tour de Suisse Women was a women's road cycling stage race held in Switzerland from 17 to 21 June. It was the tenth edition of the Tour de Suisse Women and the 21st event of the 2026 UCI Women's World Tour calendar. It happened at the same time as the men's Tour de Suisse, with both races using a similar route.

The race was won by Swiss rider Marlen Reusser of Movistar Team for the second year in succession, her third victory at the race. Reusser took the lead of the race in the stage 4 time trial, and confirmed her victory by winning the mountainous final stage. Second overall was French rider Cédrine Kerbaol of EF Education–Oatly, around 90 seconds behind Reusser. Third overall was Polish rider Katarzyna Niewiadoma-Phinney of Canyon//SRAM, a further 30 seconds behind.

In the other classifications, Reusser took the points classification, Dutch rider Femke de Vries of Visma–Lease a Bike won the mountains classification, Kerbaol won the young rider classification and AG Insurance–Soudal won the teams classification.

== Teams ==
Thirteen UCI Women's WorldTeams, one UCI Women's ProTeam, one UCI Women's Continental Team and one national team competed in the race.

UCI Women's WorldTeams

- AG Insurance–Soudal
- Canyon//SRAM
- EF Education–Oatly
- FDJ United–Suez
- Fenix–Premier Tech
- Human Powered Health
- Lidl–Trek
- Liv AlUla Jayco
- Team Picnic–PostNL
- Movistar Team
- Team SD Worx–Protime
- Visma–Lease a Bike
- UAE Team ADQ

UCI Women's ProTeams

- Ma Petite Entreprise

UCI Women's Continental Teams

- Aromitalia Vaiano

UCI Women's National Teams

- Switzerland

== Route and stages ==
Stage characteristics
Stage	Date	Course	Distance	Type	Stage winner
1	17 June	Sondrio to Sondrio	109.3 km (67.9 mi)	Hilly stage	Femke de Vries (NED)
2	18 June	Locarno to Locarno	105.6 km (65.6 mi)	Hilly stage	Elisa Longo Borghini (ITA)
3	19 June	Bad Ragaz to Bad Ragaz	120.8 km (75.1 mi)	Hilly stage	Zoe Bäckstedt (GBR)
4	20 June	Aarburg to Aarburg	23.7 km (14.7 mi)	Individual time trial	Marlen Reusser (SUI)
5	21 June	Villars-sur-Ollon to Villars-sur-Ollon	100.4 km (62.4 mi)	Mountain stage	Marlen Reusser (SUI)
Total			459.8 km (285.7 mi)		

== Stages ==
=== Stage 1 ===
17 June 2026 — Sondrio to Sondrio, 109.3 km (67.9 mi)

Stage 1 Result
Rank	Rider	Team	Time
1	Femke de Vries (NED)	Visma–Lease a Bike	2h 56' 23"
2	Lauren Dickson (GBR)	FDJ United–Suez	+ 0"
3	Cédrine Kerbaol (FRA)	EF Education–Oatly	+ 29"
4	Kim Le Court Pienaar (MRI)	AG Insurance–Soudal	+ 38"
5	Sarah Van Dam (CAN)	Visma–Lease a Bike	+ 38"
6	Steffi Häberlin (SUI)	Team SD Worx–Protime	+ 38"
7	Elisa Longo Borghini (ITA)	UAE Team ADQ	+ 38"
8	Marlen Reusser (SWI)	Movistar Team	+ 38"
9	Katarzyna Niewiadoma-Phinney (POL)	Canyon//SRAM	+ 38"
10	Juliette Berthet (FRA)	FDJ United–Suez	+ 57"

General classification after Stage 1
Rank	Rider	Team	Time
1	Femke de Vries (NED)	Visma–Lease a Bike	2h 56' 23"
2	Lauren Dickson (GBR)	FDJ United–Suez	+ 0"
3	Cédrine Kerbaol (FRA)	EF Education–Oatly	+ 29"
4	Kim Le Court Pienaar (MRI)	AG Insurance–Soudal	+ 38"
5	Sarah Van Dam (CAN)	Visma–Lease a Bike	+ 38"
6	Steffi Häberlin (SUI)	Team SD Worx–Protime	+ 38"
7	Elisa Longo Borghini (ITA)	UAE Team ADQ	+ 38"
8	Marlen Reusser (SWI)	Movistar Team	+ 38"
9	Katarzyna Niewiadoma-Phinney (POL)	Canyon//SRAM	+ 38"
10	Juliette Berthet (FRA)	FDJ United–Suez	+ 57"

=== Stage 2 ===
18 June 2026 — Locarno to Locarno, 105.6 km (65.6 mi)

Stage 2 Result
Rank	Rider	Team	Time
1	Elisa Longo Borghini (ITA)	UAE Team ADQ	2h 34' 35"
2	Sarah Van Dam (CAN)	Visma–Lease a Bike	+ 30"
3	Steffi Häberlin (SWI)	Team SD Worx–Protime	+ 47"
4	Marlen Reusser (SWI)	Movistar Team	+ 47"
5	Katarzyna Niewiadoma-Phinney (POL)	Canyon//SRAM	+ 47"
6	Kim Le Court Pienaar (MRI)	AG Insurance–Soudal	+ 1' 03"
7	Lauren Dickson (GBR)	FDJ United–Suez	+ 1' 03"
8	Cédrine Kerbaol (FRA)	EF Education–Oatly	+ 1' 03"
9	Thalita de Jong (NED)	Human Powered Health	+ 1' 29"
10	Yara Kastelijn (NED)	Fenix–Premier Tech	+ 1' 31"

General classification after Stage 2
Rank	Rider	Team	Time
1	Elisa Longo Borghini (ITA)	UAE Team ADQ	5h 31' 26"
2	Lauren Dickson (GBR)	FDJ United–Suez	+ 27"
3	Sarah Van Dam (CAN)	Visma–Lease a Bike	+ 34"
4	Steffi Häberlin (SUI)	Team SD Worx–Protime	+ 53"
5	Marlen Reusser (SWI)	Movistar Team	+ 57"
6	Katarzyna Niewiadoma-Phinney (POL)	Canyon//SRAM	+ 57"
7	Cédrine Kerbaol (FRA)	EF Education–Oatly	+ 1' 00"
8	Kim Le Court Pienaar (MRI)	AG Insurance–Soudal	+ 1' 13"
9	Femke de Vries (NED)	Visma–Lease a Bike	+ 1' 37"
10	Thalita de Jong (NED)	Human Powered Health	+ 2' 17"

=== Stage 3 ===
19 June 2026 — Bad Ragaz to Bad Ragaz, 120.8 km (75.1 mi)

Stage 3 Result
Rank	Rider	Team	Time
1	Zoe Bäckstedt (GBR)	Canyon//SRAM	2h 49' 29"
2	Lily Williams (USA)	Human Powered Health	+ 0"
3	Shari Bossuyt (BEL)	AG Insurance–Soudal	+ 0"
4	Babette van der Wolf (NED)	EF Education–Oatly	+ 0"
5	Jasmin Liechti (SUI)	Switzerland	+ 0"
6	Marta Lach (POL)	Team SD Worx–Protime	+ 0"
7	Letizia Paternoster (ITA)	Liv AlUla Jayco	+ 0"
8	Karlijn Swinkels (NED)	UAE Team ADQ	+ 0"
9	Marie Le Net (FRA)	FDJ United–Suez	+ 0"
10	Franziska Koch (GER)	FDJ United–Suez	+ 0"

General classification after Stage 3
Rank	Rider	Team	Time
1	Elisa Longo Borghini (ITA)	UAE Team ADQ	8h 20' 54"
2	Lauren Dickson (GBR)	FDJ United–Suez	+ 25"
3	Sarah Van Dam (CAN)	Visma–Lease a Bike	+ 35"
4	Steffi Häberlin (SUI)	Team SD Worx–Protime	+ 54"
5	Marlen Reusser (SUI)	Movistar Team	+ 55"
6	Katarzyna Niewiadoma-Phinney (POL)	Canyon//SRAM	+ 58"
7	Cédrine Kerbaol (FRA)	EF Education–Oatly	+ 1' 01"
8	Kim Le Court Pienaar (MRI)	AG Insurance–Soudal	+ 1' 14"
9	Femke de Vries (NED)	Visma–Lease a Bike	+ 1' 27"
10	Thalita de Jong (NED)	Human Powered Health	+ 2' 18"

=== Stage 4 ===
20 June 2026 — Aarburg to Aarburg, 23.7 km (14.7 mi)

Stage 4 Result
Rank	Rider	Team	Time
1	Marlen Reusser (SUI)	Movistar Team	29' 36"
2	Zoe Bäckstedt (GBR)	Canyon//SRAM	+ 11"
3	Loes Adegeest (NED)	Lidl–Trek	+ 54"
4	Franziska Koch (GER)	FDJ United–Suez	+ 1' 02"
5	Elisa Longo Borghini (ITA)	UAE Team ADQ	+ 1' 05"
6	Brodie Chapman (AUS)	UAE Team ADQ	+ 1' 09"
7	Maeva Squiban (FRA)	UAE Team ADQ	+ 1' 11"
8	Femke de Vries (NED)	Visma–Lease a Bike	+ 1' 11"
9	Lauretta Hanson (AUS)	Lidl–Trek	+ 1' 12"
10	Cédrine Kerbaol (FRA)	EF Education–Oatly	+ 1' 14"

General classification after Stage 4
Rank	Rider	Team	Time
1	Marlen Reusser (SUI)	Movistar Team	8h 51' 25"
2	Elisa Longo Borghini (ITA)	UAE Team ADQ	+ 10"
3	Cédrine Kerbaol (FRA)	EF Education–Oatly	+ 1' 20"
4	Sarah Van Dam (CAN)	Visma–Lease a Bike}	+ 1' 35"
5	Femke de Vries (NED)	Visma–Lease a Bike	+ 1' 43"
6	Katarzyna Niewiadoma-Phinney (POL)	Canyon//SRAM	+ 1' 49"
7	Kim Le Court Pienaar (MRI)	AG Insurance–Soudal	+ 2' 01"
8	Steffi Häberlin (SUI)	Team SD Worx–Protime	+ 2' 26"
9	Yara Kastelijn (NED)	Fenix–Premier Tech	+ 3' 19"
10	Thalita de Jong (NED)	Human Powered Health	+ 3' 57"

=== Stage 5 ===
21 June 2026 — Villars-sur-Ollon to Villars-sur-Ollon, 100.4 km (62.4 mi)

Stage 5 Result
Rank	Rider	Team	Time
1	Marlen Reusser (SUI)	Movistar Team	3h 07' 20"
2	Cédrine Kerbaol (FRA)	EF Education–Oatly	+ 7"
3	Katarzyna Niewiadoma-Phinney (POL)	Canyon//SRAM	+ 7"
4	Kim Le Court Pienaar (MRI)	AG Insurance–Soudal	+ 37"
5	Femke de Vries (NED)	Visma–Lease a Bike	+ 1' 01"
6	Steffi Häberlin (SUI)	Team SD Worx–Protime	+ 2' 28"
7	Megan Arens (NED)	Team Picnic–PostNL	+ 3' 28"
8	Sarah Van Dam (CAN)	Visma–Lease a Bike	+ 3' 41"
9	Nina Buijsman (NED)	Human Powered Health	+ 3' 42"
10	Juliette Berthet (FRA)	FDJ United–Suez	+ 4' 02"

General classification after Stage 5
Rank	Rider	Team	Time
1	Marlen Reusser (SUI)	Movistar Team	11h 58' 35"
2	Cédrine Kerbaol (FRA)	EF Education–Oatly	+ 1' 31"
3	Katarzyna Niewiadoma-Phinney (POL)	Canyon//SRAM	+ 2' 02"
4	Kim Le Court Pienaar (MRI)	AG Insurance–Soudal	+ 2' 48"
5	Femke de Vries (NED)	Visma–Lease a Bike	+ 2' 54"
6	Steffi Häberlin (SUI)	Team SD Worx–Protime	+ 5' 04"
7	Sarah Van Dam (CAN)	Visma–Lease a Bike	+ 5' 26"
8	Juliette Berthet (FRA)	FDJ United–Suez	+ 9' 41"
9	Elisa Longo Borghini (ITA)	UAE Team ADQ	+ 10' 16"
10	Yara Kastelijn (NED)	Fenix–Premier Tech	+ 11' 02"

== Classification leadership table ==
Classification leadership by stage
Stage	Winner	General classification	Points classification	Mountains classification	Young rider classification	Team classification
1	Femke de Vries	Femke de Vries	Femke de Vries	Femke de Vries	Cédrine Kerbaol	FDJ United–Suez
2	Elisa Longo Borghini	Elisa Longo Borghini	Femke de Vries	Femke de Vries	Sarah Van Dam	EF Education–Oatly
3	Zoe Bäckstedt	Elisa Longo Borghini	Femke de Vries	Femke de Vries	Sarah Van Dam	EF Education–Oatly
4	Marlen Reusser	Marlen Reusser	Zoe Bäckstedt	Femke de Vries	Cédrine Kerbaol	FDJ United–Suez
5	Marlen Reusser	Marlen Reusser	Marlen Reusser	Femke de Vries	Cédrine Kerbaol	AG Insurance–Soudal
Final		Marlen Reusser	Marlen Reusser	Femke de Vries	Cédrine Kerbaol	AG Insurance–Soudal

== Classification standings ==
Legend
Denotes the leader of the general classification	Denotes the leader of the mountains classification
Denotes the leader of the points classification	Denotes the leader of the young rider classification

=== General classification ===
Result
Rank	Rider	Team	Time
1	Marlen Reusser (SUI)	Movistar Team	11h 58' 35"
2	Cédrine Kerbaol (FRA)	EF Education–Oatly	+ 1' 31"
3	Katarzyna Niewiadoma-Phinney (POL)	Canyon//SRAM	+ 2' 02"
4	Kim Le Court-Pienaar (MRI)	AG Insurance–Soudal	+ 2' 48"
5	Femke de Vries (NED)	Visma–Lease a Bike	+ 2' 54"
6	Steffi Häberlin (SUI)	Team SD Worx–Protime	+ 5' 04"
7	Sarah Van Dam (CAN)	Visma–Lease a Bike	+ 5' 26"
8	Juliette Berthet (FRA)	FDJ United–Suez	+ 9' 41"
9	Elisa Longo Borghini (ITA)	UAE Team ADQ	+ 10' 16"
10	Yara Kastelijn (NED)	Fenix–Premier Tech	+ 11' 02"

=== Points classification ===
Result
Rank	Rider	Team	Points
1	Marlen Reusser (SUI)	Movistar Team	30
2	Femke de Vries (NED)	Visma–Lease a Bike	22
3	Zoe Bäckstedt (GBR)	Canyon//SRAM	20
4	Elisa Longo Borghini (ITA)	UAE Team ADQ	14
5	Katarzyna Niewiadoma-Phinney (POL)	Canyon//SRAM	14
6	Cédrine Kerbaol (FRA)	EF Education–Oatly	14
7	Kim Le Court-Pienaar (MRI)	AG Insurance–Soudal	10
8	Sarah Van Dam (CAN)	Visma–Lease a Bike	10
9	Margot Vanpachtenbeke (BEL)	Lidl–Trek	6
10	Steffi Häberlin (SUI)	Team SD Worx–Protime	6

=== Mountains classification ===
Result
Rank	Rider	Team	Points
1	Femke de Vries (NED)	Visma–Lease a Bike	30
2	Marlen Reusser (SUI)	Movistar Team	24
3	Megan Arens (NED)	Team Picnic–PostNL	17
4	Katarzyna Niewiadoma-Phinney (POL)	Canyon//SRAM	11
5	Cédrine Kerbaol (FRA)	EF Education–Oatly	8
6	Elisa Longo Borghini (ITA)	UAE Team ADQ	7
7	Steffi Häberlin (SUI)	Team SD Worx–Protime	6
8	Maeva Squiban (FRA)	UAE Team ADQ	4
9	Juliette Berthet (FRA)	FDJ United–Suez	2
10	Thalita de Jong (NED)	Human Powered Health	2

=== Young rider classification ===
Result
Rank	Rider	Team	Time
1	Cédrine Kerbaol (FRA)	EF Education–Oatly	12h 00' 06"
2	Sarah Van Dam (CAN)	Visma–Lease a Bike	+ 3' 55"
3	Megan Arens (NED)	Team Picnic–PostNL	+ 10' 39"
4	Clémence Latimier (FRA)	Ma Petite Entreprise	+ 12' 09"
5	Talia Appleton (AUS)	Liv AlUla Jayco	+ 12' 21"
6	Jasmin Liechti (SUI)	Switzerland	+ 14' 16"
7	Nienke Vinke (NED)	Team SD Worx–Protime	+ 14' 59"
8	Alice Towers (GBR)	EF Education–Oatly	+ 18' 50"
9	Maeva Squiban (FRA)	UAE Team ADQ	+ 22' 31"
10	Justyna Czapla (GER)	Canyon//SRAM	+ 26' 28"

=== Team classification ===
Result
Rank	Team	Time
1	(Belgium) AG Insurance–Soudal	36h 34' 16"
2	(Netherlands) Visma–Lease a Bike	+ 7' 15"
3	(United States) EF Education–Oatly	+ 11' 16"
4	(France) FDJ United–Suez	+ 11' 30"
5	(Spain) Movistar Team	+ 20' 21"
6	(Netherlands) Team SD Worx–Protime	+ 20' 28"
7	(United Arab Emirates) UAE Team ADQ	+ 29' 40"
8	(Germany) Canyon//SRAM	+ 30' 44"
9	Switzerland	+ 31' 20"
10	(France) Ma Petite Entreprise	+ 31' 24"

== See also ==
- 2026 in women's road cycling
