= UCI Road World Championships – Junior women's time trial =

UCI Road World Championships – Junior women's time trial is the annual world championship for road bicycle racing in the discipline of time trial, organised by the world governing body, the Union Cycliste Internationale. The event was first run in 1994. In 2020 no junior race was held due to the COVID-19 pandemic.

== Medal winners ==
Championships	Gold	Silver	Bronze
1994 Quito	Chiara Mariani (ITA)	Evi Gensheimer (GER)	Ita Kryjanovskaia (RUS)
1995 San Marino	Linda Visentin (ITA)	Christina Becker (GER)	Tetyana Styazhkina (UKR)
1996 Novo Mesto	Rachael Linke (AUS)	Natascha Klewitz (GER)	Samanta Loschi (ITA)
1997 San Sebastián	Olga Zabelinskaïa (RUS)	Sylvia Hübscher (GER)	Maria Cagigas (ESP)
1998 Valkenburg	Trixi Worrack (GER)	Olga Zabelinskaïa (RUS)	Geneviève Jeanson (CAN)
1999 Verona	Geneviève Jeanson (CAN)	Juliette Vandekerckhove (FRA)	Trixi Worrack (GER)
2000 Plouay	Juliette Vandekerckhove (FRA)	Katherine Bates (AUS)	Bertine Spijkerman (NED)
2001 Lisbon	Nicole Cooke (GBR)	Natalia Boyarskaya (RUS)	Diana Elmentaitė (LTU)
2002 Zolder	Anna Zugno (ITA)	Tatiana Guderzo (ITA)	Claudia Hecht (GER)
2003 Hamilton	Bianca Purath-Knoepfle (GER)	Loes Markerink (NED)	Iris Slappendel (NED)
2004 Verona	Tereza Huříková (CZE)	Rebecca Much (USA)	Amanda Spratt (AUS)
2005 Oberwart	Lisa Brennauer (GER)	Tereza Huříková (CZE)	Mie Bekker Lacota (DEN)
2006 Spa – Francorchamps	Rebecca Spence (NZL)	Lesya Kalytovska (UKR)	Mie Bekker Lacota (DEN)
2007 Aguascalientes	Josephine Tomic (AUS)	Valeriya Kononenko (UKR)	Jerika Hutchinson (USA)
2008 Cape Town	Maria Grandt Petersen (DEN)	Valeriya Kononenko (UKR)	Laura Dittmann (GER)
2009 Moscow	Hanna Solovey (UKR)	Pauline Ferrand-Prévot (FRA)	Yelyzaveta Oshurkova (UKR)
2010 Offida	Hanna Solovey (UKR)	Pauline Ferrand-Prévot (FRA)	Amy Cure (AUS)
2011 Copenhagen	Jessica Allen (AUS)	Elinor Barker (GBR)	Mieke Kröger (GER)
2012 Limburg	Elinor Barker (GBR)	Cecilie Uttrup Ludwig (DEN)	Demi de Jong (NED)
2013 Florence	Séverine Eraud (FRA)	Alexandria Nicholls (AUS)	Alexandra Manly (AUS)
2014 Ponferrada	Macey Stewart (AUS)	Pernille Mathiesen (DEN)	Anna-Leeza Hull (AUS)
2015 Richmond	Chloé Dygert (USA)	Emma White (USA)	Anna-Leeza Hull (AUS)
2016 Doha	Karlijn Swinkels (NED)	Lisa Morzenti (ITA)	Juliette Labous (FRA)
2017 Bergen	Elena Pirrone (ITA)	Alessia Vigilia (ITA)	Madeleine Fasnacht (AUS)
2018 Innsbruck	Rozemarijn Ammerlaan (NED)	Camilla Alessio (ITA)	Elynor Bäckstedt (GBR)
2019 Yorkshire	Aigul Gareeva (RUS)	Shirin van Anrooij (NED)	Elynor Bäckstedt (GBR)
2021 Flanders	Alena Ivanchenko (RUS)	Zoe Bäckstedt (GBR)	Antonia Niedermaier (GER)
2022 Wollongong	Zoe Bäckstedt (GBR)	Justyna Czapla (GER)	Febe Jooris (BEL)
2023 Glasgow	Felicity Wilson-Haffenden (AUS)	Izzy Sharp (GBR)	Federica Venturelli (ITA)
2024 Zurich	Cat Ferguson (GBR)	Viktória Chladoňová (SVK)	Imogen Wolff (GBR)
2025 Kigali	Megan Arens (NED)	Paula Ostiz (ESP)	Oda Aune Gissinger (NOR)

=== Medallists by nation ===
Rank	Nation	Gold	Silver	Bronze	Total
1	Australia	5	2	6	13
2	Italy	4	4	2	10
3	Great Britain	4	3	3	10
4	Germany	3	5	5	13
5	Netherlands	3	2	3	8
6	Russia	3	2	1	6
7	Ukraine	2	3	2	7
8	France	2	3	1	6
9	Denmark	1	2	2	5
10	United States	1	2	1	4
11	Czech Republic	1	1	0	2
12	Canada	1	0	1	2
13	New Zealand	1	0	0	1
14	Spain	0	1	1	2
15	Slovakia	0	1	0	1
16	Belgium	0	0	1	1
16	Lithuania	0	0	1	1
16	Norway	0	0	1	1
Totals (18 entries)		31	31	31	93
