= Rozemarijn Ammerlaan =

Dutch cyclist (born 2000)

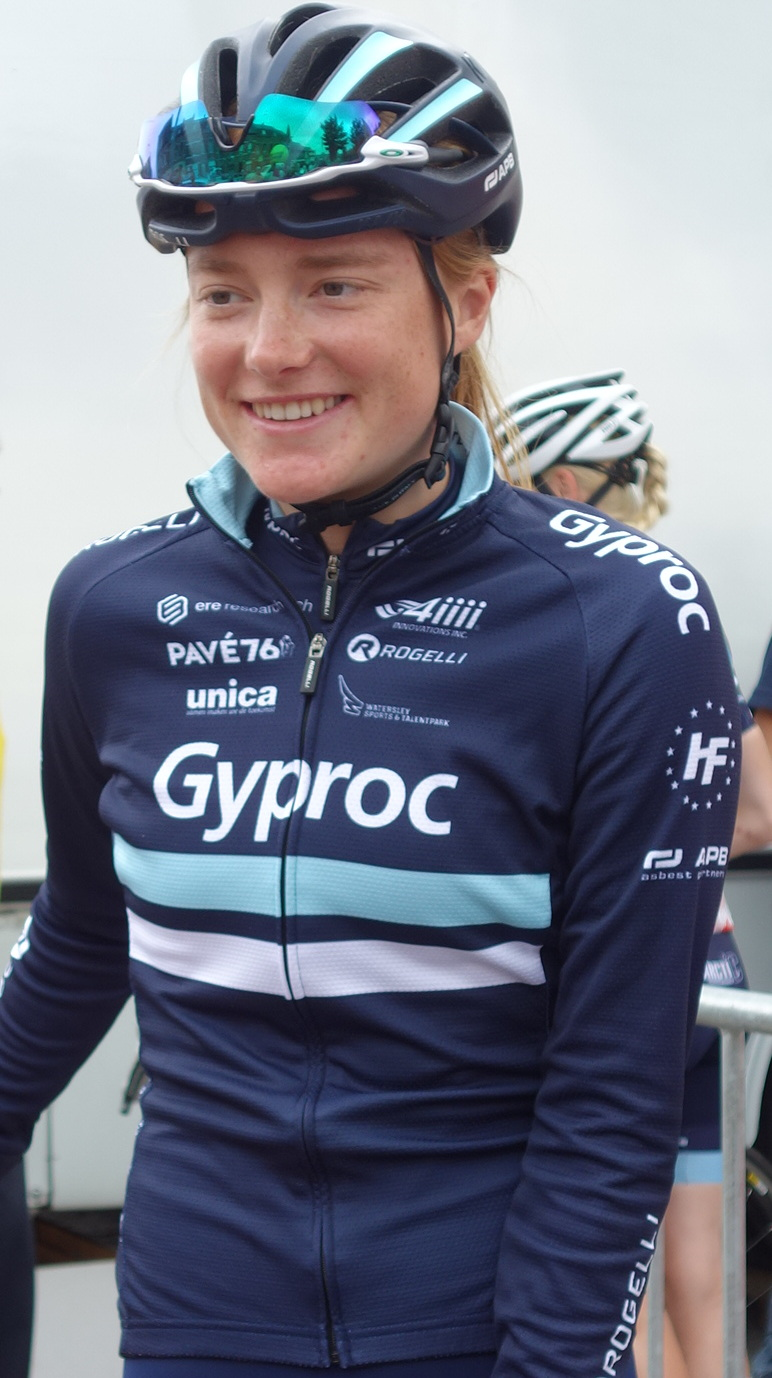
- Ammerlaan in 2019

Personal information
- Full name: Rozemarijn Ammerlaan
- Born: 4 January 2000 (age 26)

Cycling career
- Sport: Cycling
- Discipline: Road
- Role: Rider

Amateur team
- 2019: Rogelli–Gyproc–APB

Professional team
- 2020–2021: NXTG Racing

Rozemarijn Ammerlaan (born 4 January 2000) is a Dutch former racing cyclist, who last rode for UCI Women's Continental Team NXTG Racing. She won the junior women's time trial event at the 2018 UCI Road World Championships. Ammerlaan retired from competition at the end of 2021.

== Major results ==
2018
1st Time trial, UCI Junior Road World Championships
1st Time trial, National Junior Road Championships
1st Chrono des Nations Juniors
2nd Overall Watersley Ladies Challenge

1st Stage 2 (ITT)

5th Overall Omloop van Borsele
8th Time trial, European Junior Road Championships
