= Eleonora Ciabocco =

Italian cyclist

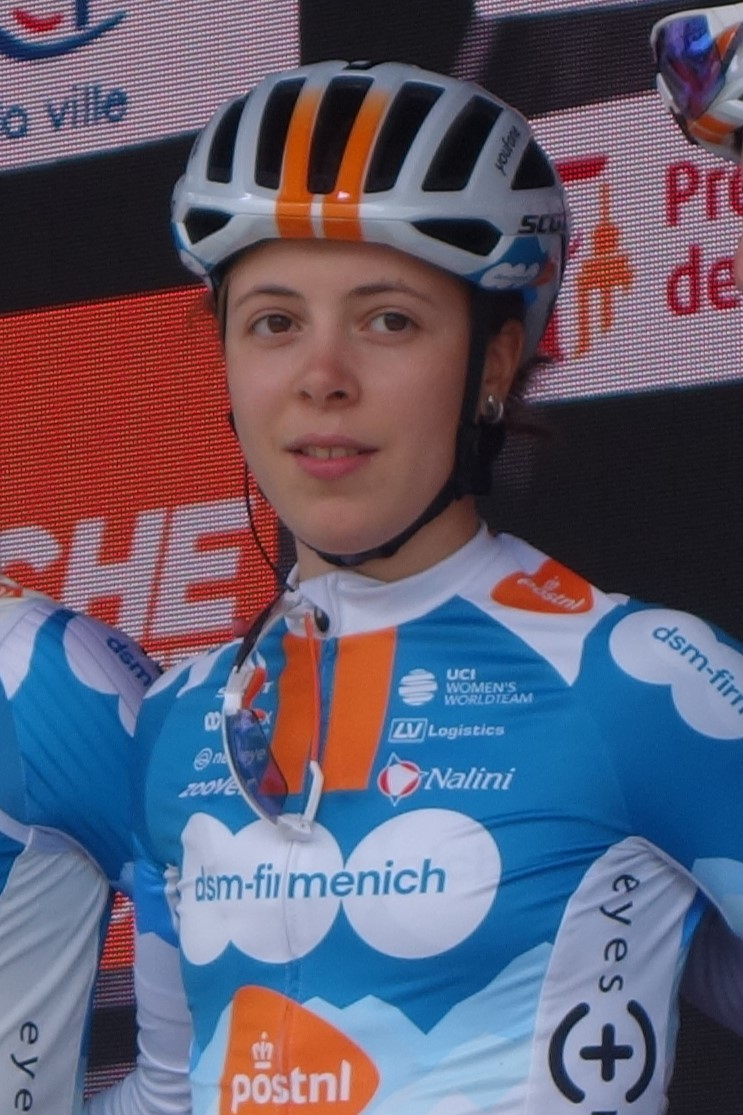
- Ciabocco in 2024.

Personal information
- Born: 4 March 2004 (age 22) Macerata, Italy

Cycling career
- Sport: Cycling
- Current team: Team Picnic–PostNL
- Discipline: Road
- Role: Rider

Amateur team
- 2021–2022: Ciclismo Insieme Team di Federico

Professional team
- 2023–: Team DSM
Medal record
Representing Italy
Women's road bicycle racing
European Championships
Silver medal – second place	2021 Trentino	Junior road race
Silver medal – second place	2022 Anadia	Junior road race
Silver medal – second place	2025 Guilherand-Granges	Under-23 road race

Eleonora Ciabocco (born 4 March 2004) is an Italian road cyclist, who currently rides for UCI Women's World Team Team Picnic–PostNL.

== Major results ==
2021
National Junior Road Championships

1st Road race
3rd Time trial

2nd Road race, UEC European Junior Road Championships
5th Piccolo Trofeo Alfredo Binda
9th Road race, UCI Road World Junior Championships
2022
National Junior Road Championships

1st Road race
3rd Time trial

2nd Road race, UEC European Junior Road Championships
7th Overall Tour du Gévaudan Occitanie
8th Road race, UCI Road World Junior Championships
9th Piccolo Trofeo Alfredo Binda
2024
6th Overall Tour de l'Avenir
7th Brabantse Pijl
2025
1st Young rider classification, Tour Down Under
1st Young rider classification, Setmana Ciclista Valenciana
4th Road race, UCI Road World Under-23 Championships
2026
6th Overall UAE Tour
