= Febe Jooris =

Belgian cyclist

- Jooris in 2024

Personal information
- Born: 4 October 2004 (age 22) Deinze, Belgium

Cycling career
- Sport: Cycling
- Current team: UAE Team L'Imad
- Disciplines: Road; Track
- Role: Rider
- Rider type: Time trialist

Professional teams
- 2023–2024: AG Insurance–NXTG U23 Team
- 2025: UAE Development Team
- 2026–: UAE Team ADQ
Medal record
Representing Belgium
Women's road cycling
UCI Road World Championships
Bronze medal – third place	2022 Wollongong	Junior time trial
European Road Championships
Bronze medal – third place	2022 Anadia	Junior time trial
Women's track cycling
European Junior Championships
Bronze medal – third place	2022 Anadia	Madison

Febe Jooris (born 4 October 2004) is a Belgian racing cyclist, who currently rides for UCI Women's WorldTeam UAE Team L'Imad.

== Major results ==
2021
9th Time trial, UCI World Junior Road Championships
2022
1st Time trial, National Junior Road Championships
3rd Time trial, UCI World Junior Road Championships
3rd Time trial, UEC European Under-23 Road Championships
2023
1st Time trial, National Under-23 Road Championships
2nd Time trial, National Road Championships
2024
1st Time trial, National Under-23 Road Championships
3rd Omloop van Borsele Time trial
8th Time trial, UEC European Under-23 Road Championships
9th Overall Baloise Ladies Tour
10th Overall Tour de Feminin
10th Omloop van Borsele Road race
2025
3rd Time trial, National Under-23 Road Championships
