= Megan Arens =

Dutch cyclist (born 2007)

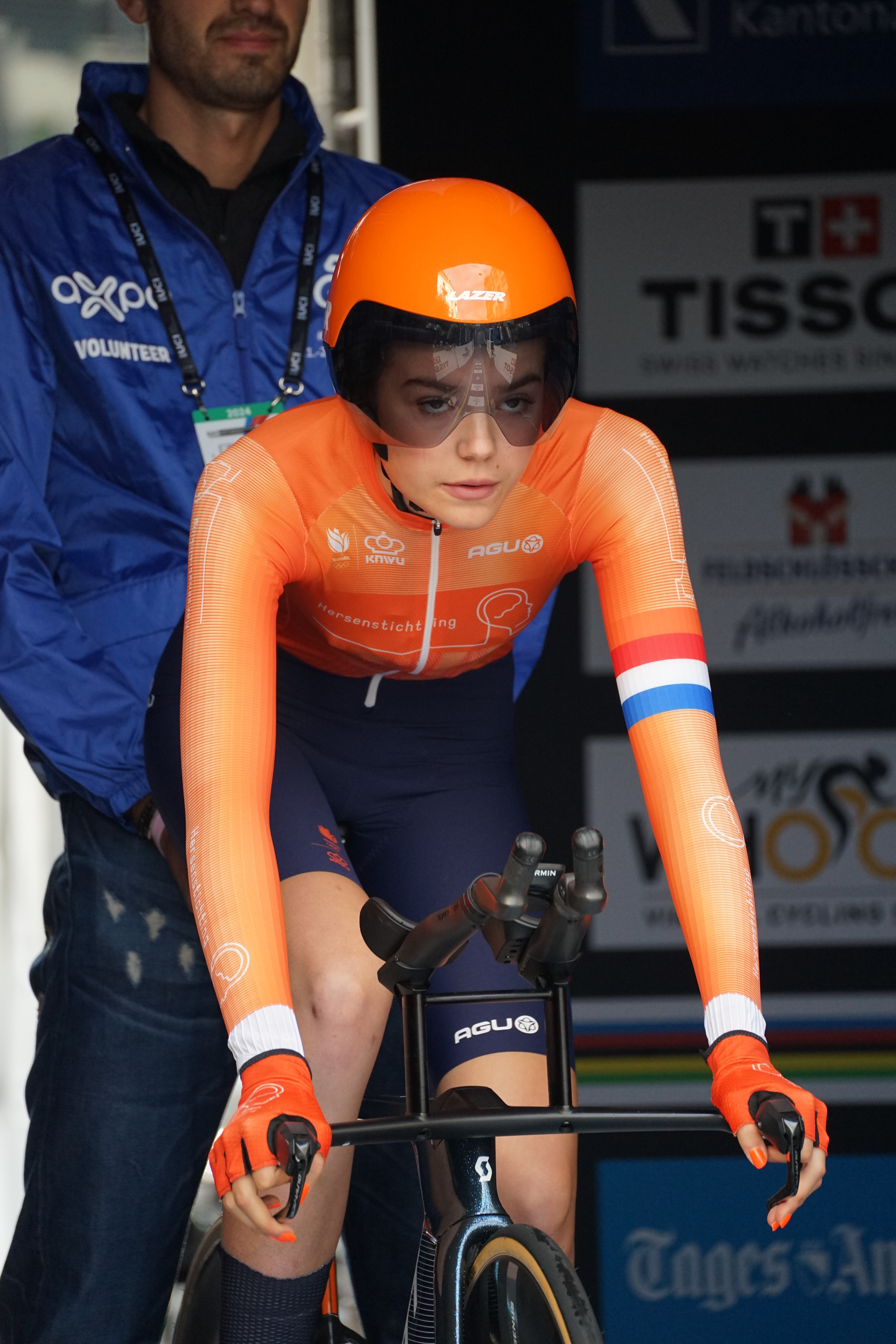
- Arens at the 2024 UCI Road World Championships in Zurich

Personal information
- Born: 14 March 2007 (age 19) Kruiningen, Zeeland

Cycling career
- Sport: Cycling
- Current team: AG Insurance–Soudal
- Discipline: Road
- Role: Rider

Amateur teams
- 2024: Restore Cycling
- 2025: Grouwels-Watersley R&D Road Team

Professional teams
- 2026: Team Picnic–PostNL
- 2026–: AG Insurance–Soudal

Megan Arens (born 14 March 2007) is a Dutch professional cyclist who rides for UCI Women's WorldTeam AG Insurance–Soudal. She won the junior time trial at the 2025 UCI Road World Championships in Kigali.

== Career ==
In 2023, Arens won gold in the time trial at the European Youth Olympic Festival.

In 2025, her final year as a junior, Arens was successful in both one-day races, coming second in the junior versions of Ronde van Vlaanderen and Gent–Wevelgem, and time trials, winning world and national junior titles. Arens stated she focused primarily on time trials in training, as they had the shortest training sessions and she was busy studying for exams.

Arens signed a professional contract with Team Picnic–PostNL in October 2025, just after the world championships. In August 2026, after a strong debut professional season that included strong climbing performances at the Tour de Suisse, Arens made an immediate transfer to AG Insurance–Soudal.

== Major results ==
2024
UCI Junior World Championships

4th Road race
9th Time trial

2025
1st Time trial, UCI Junior World Championships
1st Time trial, National Junior Championships
1st Junior Chrono des Nations
1st Piccolo Trofeo Alfredo Binda
2nd Junior Ronde Van Vlaanderen
2nd Junior Gent-Wevelgem
