= María Fernanda Sánchez =

Mexican footballer (born 2004)

Personal information
- Full name: María Fernanda Sánchez Castillo
- Date of birth: 24 February 2004 (age 22)
- Place of birth: Venustiano Carranza, Mexico City, Mexico
- Height: 1.53 m (5 ft 0 in)
- Position: Winger

Team information
- Current team: Atlético San Luis
- Number: 8

Senior career*
Years	Team	Apps	(Gls)
2020–2025	Toluca	110	(4)
2024	→ Atlético San Luis (loan)	32	(5)
2025–	Atlético San Luis	26	(4)
- * Club domestic league appearances and goals as of 6 February 2026 ‡ National team caps and goals as of 12 March 2022

María Fernanda Sánchez Castillo (born 24 February 2004) is a Mexican professional footballer who plays as a Winger for Liga MX Femenil side Atlético San Luis.

== Club career ==
In 2020, she started her career in Toluca. In 2024, she joined Atlético San Luis.
