= Zoe Bäckstedt =

Welsh cyclist

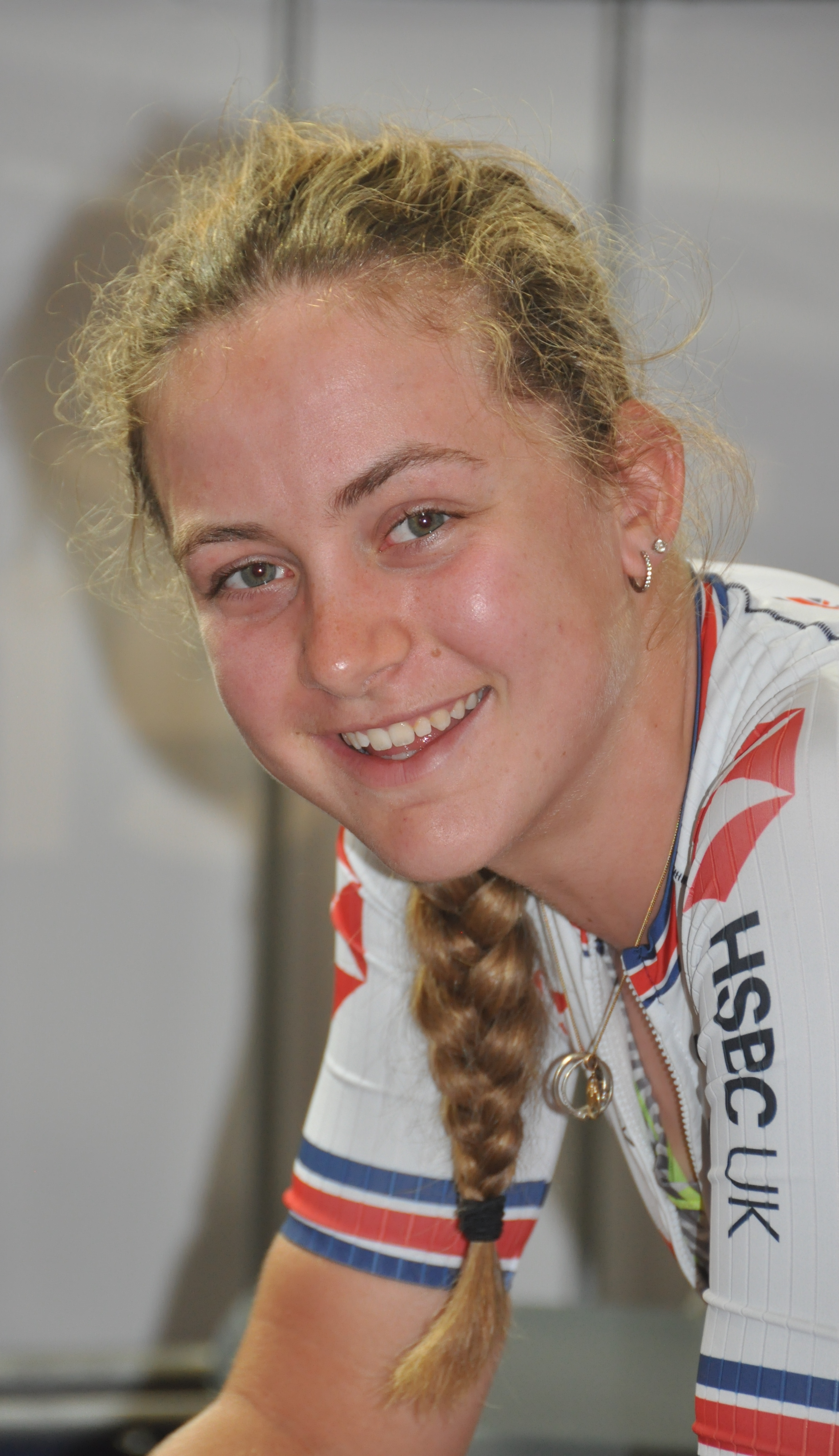
- Bäckstedt in 2021

Personal information
- Full name: Jane Zoe Bäckstedt
- Born: 24 September 2004 (age 22) Pontyclun, Wales
- Height: 1.76 m (5 ft 9 in)

Cycling career
- Sport: Cycling
- Current team: Canyon//SRAM
- Disciplines: Road; Track; Cyclo-cross
- Role: Rider

Professional teams
- 2022–2023: EF Education–Tibco–SVB
- 2023–: Canyon//SRAM

Major wins
- Cyclo-cross National Championships (2023) Road One-day races and Classics National Road Race Championships (2026) National Time Trial Championships (2025, 2026)
Medal record
Representing Great Britain
Women's road bicycle racing
World Championships
Gold medal – first place	2021 Flanders	Junior road race
Gold medal – first place	2022 Wollongong	Junior road race
Gold medal – first place	2022 Wollongong	Junior time trial
Gold medal – first place	2025 Kigali	Under-23 time trial
Silver medal – second place	2026 Montreal	Elite time trial
Silver medal – second place	2021 Flanders	Junior time trial
European Championships
Gold medal – first place	2023 Drenthe	Under-23 time trial
Women's cyclo-cross
World Championships
Gold medal – first place	2025 Liévin	Under-23
Gold medal – first place	2025 Liévin	Mixed relay
Gold medal – first place	2024 Tábor	Under-23
Gold medal – first place	2022 Fayetteville	Junior
Silver medal – second place	2024 Tábor	Team relay
Silver medal – second place	2023 Hoogerheide	Under-23
Silver medal – second place	2023 Hoogerheide	Team relay
European Championships
Gold medal – first place	2023 Pontchâteau	Under-23
Gold medal – first place	2021 Wijster	Junior
Women's track cycling
World Junior Championships
Gold medal – first place	2022 Tel Aviv	Madison
European Junior Championships
Gold medal – first place	2021 Apeldoorn	Individual pursuit
Gold medal – first place	2021 Apeldoorn	Madison
Gold medal – first place	2021 Apeldoorn	Team pursuit

Jane Zoe Bäckstedt (born 24 September 2004) is a Welsh professional racing cyclist riding for UCI Women's World Tour Team Canyon//SRAM, competing across road, cyclo-cross and track racing disciplines.

== Career ==
At the 2021 UCI Road World Championships, Bäckstedt won the gold medal in the junior women's road race, and silver in the junior women's time trial. A year later, she upgraded junior time-trial silver to gold, winning the event by over a minute and a half before successfully defending her road race title with a dominant solo victory, and her third road world championship at junior level.

At the 2022 UCI Cyclo-cross World Championships, Bäckstedt won a second world junior title, this time in the cyclo-cross discipline. In 2025 she won her first 'senior' World Championship at the 2025 UCI Cyclo-cross World Championships in the mixed team relay for Great Britain; while technically still an under-23 rider, she took the elite rider spot in the relay, allowing Cat Ferguson to take the under-23 leg.

This completed a hat-trick of world titles across three different disciplines, having won the Madison at the 2022 UCI Junior Track Cycling World Championships. Bäckstedt is a three time European junior champion on the track and a junior and under-23 European cyclo-cross champion.

In 2022, at the age of 17, Bäckstedt signed with UCI Women's World Tour Team EF Education–Tibco–SVB

In 2024, Bäckstedt won first place in the U23 Women's race at the UCI Cyclo-cross World Championships.

At the 2025 UCI Road World Championships in Rwanda, Bäckstedt won the under-23 time trial. She also won the time trial on the opening stage of the 2026 Vuelta a Extremadura.

In June 2026, she won stage three of the Tour de Suisse Femmes, before winning both the road race and the time trial at the British National Championships. Her victories in the National Championships made her the first female cyclist to win both in the same year since Alice Wood in 2019. In July, she retained her Baloise Ladies Tour title.

Bäckstedt was selected for the 2026 Tour de France Femmes, and will make her debut.

== Personal life ==
Bäckstedt's mother, Megan Hughes, and father, Magnus, are both former professional cyclists, and her sister Elynor also rides professionally.

In 2023, Bäckstedt announced via Instagram that she was in a relationship with Dutch speed skater Femke Beuling.

== Major results ==
=== Cyclo-cross ===
2020–2021
1st Overall UCI Junior World Cup

1st Tábor

2021–2022 (3 pro wins)
1st UCI World Junior Championships
1st UEC European Junior Championships
Ethias Cross

1st Essen
2nd Meulebeke

Stockholm Weekend

1st Täby Park
1st Stockholm

2nd Overall UCI Junior World Cup

1st Tábor
1st Namur
1st Dendermonde

Junior Superprestige

1st Gieten

Junior X²O Badkamers Trophy

1st Lille

3rd Gullegem
2022–2023 (1)
1st National Championships
2nd UCI World Under-23 Championships
Coupe de France

2nd Nommay II

UCI World Cup

4th Gavere
4th Besançon

5th UEC European Under-23 Championships
2023–2024 (3)
1st UCI World Under-23 Championships
1st UEC European Under-23 Championships
1st Gullegem
1st Indianapolis I
1st Indianapolis II
2nd Waterloo
UCI World Cup

3rd Dendermonde
3rd Dublin
3rd Zonhoven
4th Hoogerheide
5th Waterloo

3rd Woerden
2024–2025
UCI World Championships

1st Under-23
1st Team relay

UCI World Cup

2nd Zonhoven
2nd Maasmechelen
3rd Dublin
4th Besançon
5th Gavere
5th Dendermonde

Superprestige

2nd Gullegem

2025–2026
X²O Badkamers Trophy

3rd Baal

UCI World Cup

4th Hoogerheide

=== Road ===
2021
UCI World Junior Championships

1st Road race
2nd Time trial

1st Time trial, National Junior Championships
5th Overall Watersley Ladies Challenge

1st Youth classification
1st Stage 2 (ITT)

2022
UCI World Junior Championships

1st Road race
1st Time trial

National Junior Championships

1st Road race
1st Time trial

1st Overall EPZ Omloop van Borsele Juniors

1st Points classification
1st Stages 1 (ITT) & 3

1st Overall Watersley Ladies Challenge

1st Mountains classification
1st Stages 1, 2 (ITT) & 3

1st Overall U6 Cycle Tour

1st Points classification
1st Young rider classification
1st Stages 1 (ITT), 2, 3, 4, 5 & 6 (ITT)

2023
1st Time trial, UEC European Under-23 Championships
5th Overall Simac Ladies Tour

1st Young rider classification

2024 (1 pro win)
2nd Antwerp Port Epic
3rd Overall Simac Ladies Tour

1st Young rider classification
1st Stage 1 (ITT)

2025 (6)
1st Time trial, UCI World Under-23 Championships
1st Time trial, National Championships
1st Overall Baloise Ladies Tour

1st Young rider classification
1st Prologue, Stages 3a & 3b (ITT)

1st Stage 5 (ITT) Simac Ladies Tour
5th Dwars door het Hageland
2026 (7)
National Championships

1st Road race
1st Time trial

1st Overall Baloise Ladies Tour

1st Young rider classification
1st Prologue & Stage 3a (ITT)

1st Stage 3 Tour de Suisse
1st Stage 1 (ITT) Vuelta a Extremadura
2nd UCI Road World Championships – Women's time trial
4th Dwars door Vlaanderen
5th Tour of Flanders

=== Track ===
2021
UEC European Junior Championships

1st Individual pursuit
1st Madison (with Millie Couzens)
1st Team pursuit

National Junior Championships

1st Individual pursuit
1st Madison (with Millie Couzens)

2022
1st Madison, UCI World Junior Championships (with Grace Lister)

=== Mountain bike ===
2021
3rd Cross-country, National Junior Championships
