= Izzy Sharp (cyclist) =

British cyclist (born 2005)

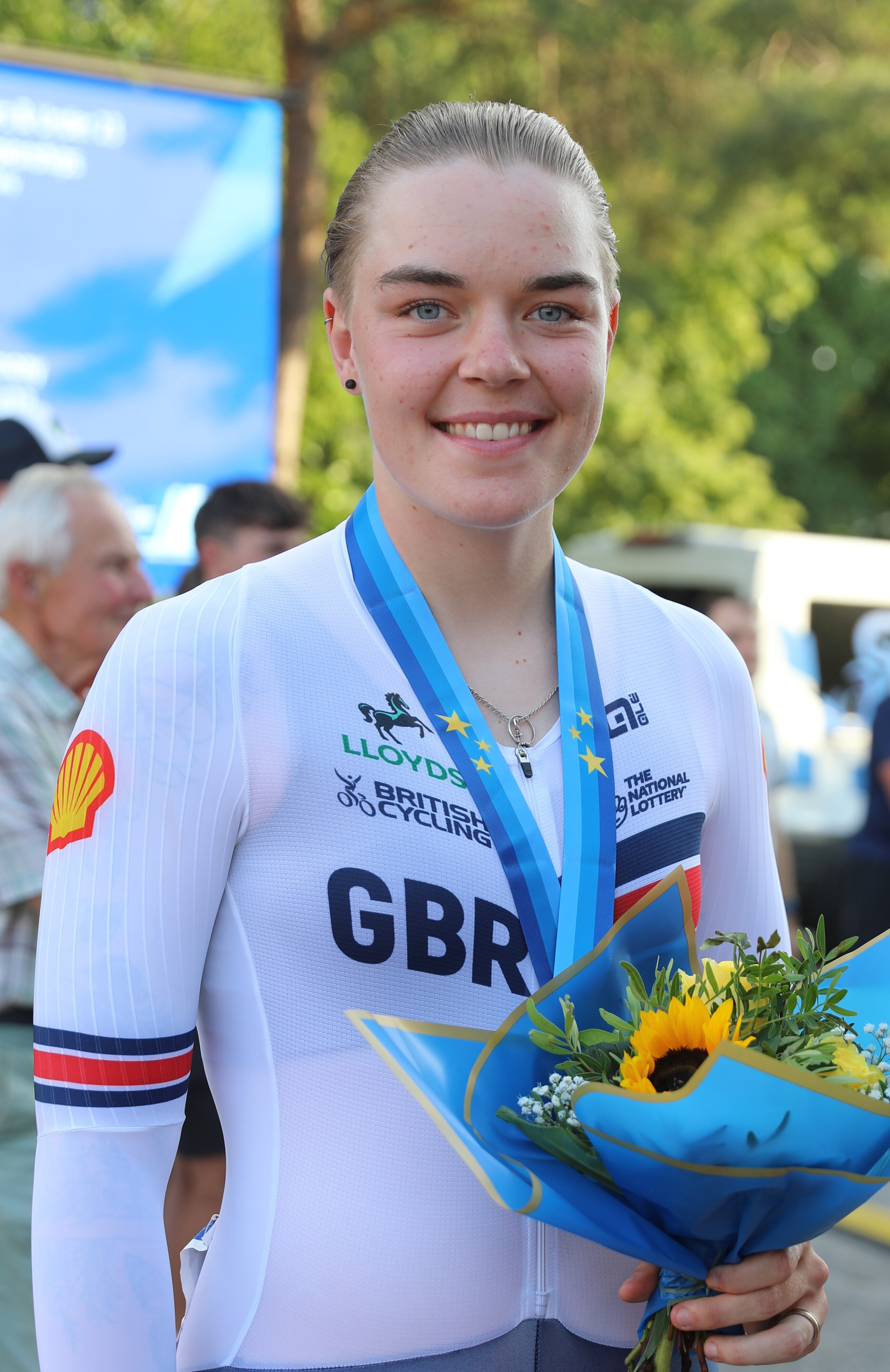
- Sharp in 2026

Personal information
- Born: Isabel Sharp; 29 June 2005 (age 21)

Cycling career
- Sport: Cycling
- Current team: Lidl–Trek
- Disciplines: Track; Road
- Role: Rider

Professional team
- 2024–: Lidl–Trek
Medal record
Representing United Kingdom
Women's road bicycle racing
World Championships
Silver medal – second place	2023 Glasgow	Junior time trial
Women's track cycling
World Junior Championships
Silver medal – second place	2022 Tel Aviv	Individual pursuit
Silver medal – second place	2023 Cali	Points race
Silver medal – second place	2023 Cali	Elimination race
Bronze medal – third place	2022 Tel Aviv	Elimination race
European Under-23 Championships
Gold medal – first place	2024 Cottbus	Team pursuit
Gold medal – first place	2025 Anadia	Team pursuit
European Junior Championships
Gold medal – first place	2022 Anadia	Points race
Gold medal – first place	2023 Anadia	Madison
Silver medal – second place	2022 Anadia	Individual pursuit
Bronze medal – third place	2023 Anadia	Team pursuit

Isabel Sharp (born 29 June 2005) is a British road and track racing cyclist, who rides for UCI Women's WorldTeam Lidl–Trek.

== Early life ==
From Southampton, she was a member of Poole Wheelers cycling club.

== Career ==
She won gold in the points race at the 2022 Junior UEC European Track Championships and in the Madison at the 2023 UEC Junior European Track Championships. She won silver medals in the points race and the elimination race at the 2023 UCI Junior Track Cycling World Championships.

In 2023, competing on the road she won Gent-Wevelgem Juniors, Omloop van Borsele and was second at the 2023 UCI Road World Championships in the junior time trial behind Felicity Wilson-Haffenden.

She turned pro with UCI Women's WorldTeam Lidl–Trek in 2024 in a three-year contract.

== Major results ==
=== Road ===
2022
2nd Overall Omloop van Borsele

1st Young rider classification

5th Gent–Wevelgem Juniors
10th Time trial, UCI World Junior Road Championships
2023
1st Overall Omloop van Borsele

1st Stage 1

1st Gent–Wevelgem Juniors
2nd Time trial, UCI World Junior Road Championships
3rd Time trial, National Junior Championships
3th Piccolo Trofeo Alfredo Binda
2025
2nd Criterium, National Championships

=== Track ===
2022
1st Team pursuit, National Championships
2024
National Championships

1st Team pursuit
3rd Individual pursuit

2025
2nd Individual pursuit, National Championships
2026
UEC European Under-23 Championships

2nd Madison (with Imogen Wolff)
3rd Individual pursuit
