= 2018 BeNe Ladies Tour =

Race details
- Dates: 19–22 July 2018
- Stages: 4 + Prologue
- Distance: 360.7 km (224.1 mi)

The 2018 BeNe Ladies Tour was the fifth edition of the BeNe Ladies Tour, a women's cycling stage race in the Netherlands. It is rated by the UCI as a category 2.1 race.

== Stages ==
List of stages
| Stage | Date | Course | Distance | Type | Winner |
|---|---|---|---|---|---|
| P | 19 July | Oosterhout to Oosterhout | 3.9 km (2.4 mi) | Prologue | Katie Archibald (GBR) |
| 1 | 20 July | Merelbeke to Merelbeke | 135.5 km (84.2 mi) | Flat stage | Marianne Vos (NED) |
| 2a | 21 July | Sint Laureins to Sint Laureins | 98.3 km (61.1 mi) | Flat stage | Lorena Wiebes (NED) |
| 2b | 21 July | Sint Laureins to Sint Laureins | 10.1 km (6.3 mi) | Time Trial | Trixi Worrack (GER) |
| 3 | 22 July | Zelzate to Zelzate | 112.9 km (70.2 mi) | Flat stage | Marta Bastianelli (ITA) |
| Total | | | 360.7 km (224.1 mi) | | |

== Classification leadership ==
| Stage | Winner | General classification | Points classification | Sprint classification | Young rider classification | Team classification |
|---|---|---|---|---|---|---|
| P | Katie Archibald | Katie Archibald | Katie Archibald | Not awarded | Pernille Mathiesen | Wiggle High5 |
| 1 | Marianne Vos | Marianne Vos | Marianne Vos | Marianne Vos | Pernille Mathiesen | Wiggle High5 |
| 2a | Lorena Wiebes | Marianne Vos | Marianne Vos | Eugenia Bujak | Lisa Klein | Wiggle High5 |
| 2b | Trixi Worrack | Marianne Vos | Marianne Vos | Eugenia Bujak | Lisa Klein | Wiggle High5 |
| 3 | Marta Bastianelli | Marianne Vos | Marianne Vos | Marianne Vos | Lisa Klein | Wiggle High5 |
| Final Classification | | Marianne Vos | Marianne Vos | Marianne Vos | Lisa Klein | Wiggle High5 |

== See also ==
- 2018 in women's road cycling
