= Nienke Vinke =

Dutch cyclist (born 2004)

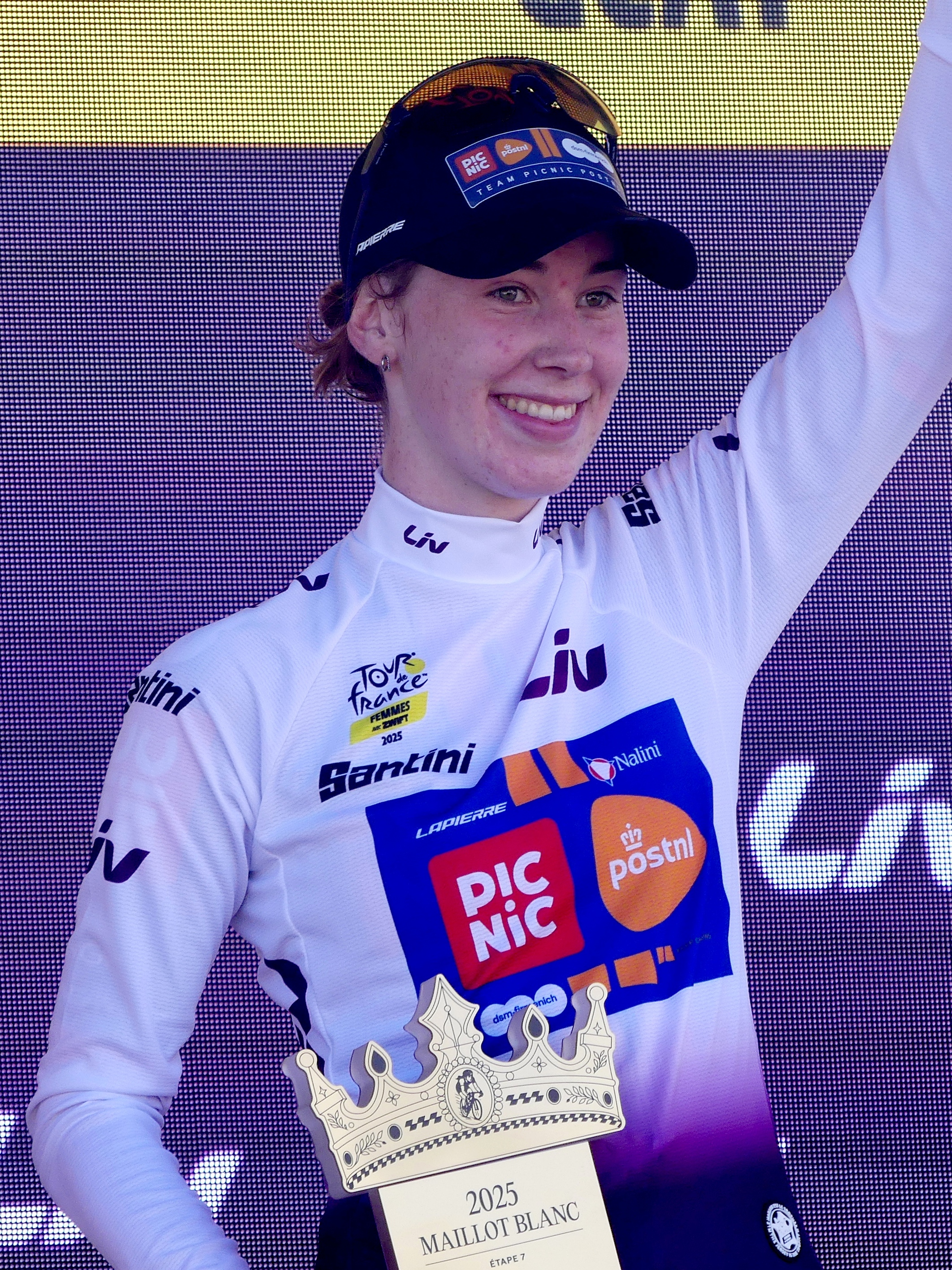
- Vinke at the 2025 Tour de France Femmes

Personal information
- Born: 22 June 2004 (age 22) Amersfoort, Netherlands

Cycling career
- Sport: Cycling
- Current team: Team SD Worx–Protime
- Discipline: Road
- Role: Rider

Amateur team
- 2021–2022: NXTG U19

Professional teams
- 2023–2025: Team DSM
- 2026–: Team SD Worx–Protime

Major wins
- Major Tours Tour de France Young rider classification (2025)
Medal record
Representing Netherlands
Women's road bicycle racing
World Championships
Bronze medal – third place	2022 Wollongong	Junior road race
European Championships
Gold medal – first place	2026 Ljubljana	Under-23 time trial
Silver medal – second place	2026 Ljubljana	Under-23 road race
Women's cyclo-cross
Bronze medal – third place	2021 Wijster	Junior

Nienke Vinke (born 22 June 2004) is a Dutch professional racing cyclist, who currently rides for UCI Women's WorldTeam Team SD Worx–Protime.

== Major results ==
=== Cyclo-cross ===
2021–2022
3rd UEC European Junior Championships
Junior Superprestige

3rd Gieten

=== Road ===
2021
2nd Road race, National Junior Championships
5th Overall Tour du Gévaudan Occitanie
6th Overall Watersley Ladies Challenge
2022
National Junior Championships

1st Road race
1st Time trial

1st Overall Bizkaikoloreak
UCI World Junior Championships

3rd Road race
7th Time trial

4th Overall Omloop van Borsele
UEC European Junior Championships

5th Road race
5th Time trial

5th Overall Tour du Gévaudan Occitanie
6th Piccolo Trofeo Alfredo Binda
2023
7th Overall Tour de l'Avenir
9th Tre Valli Varesine
2024
2nd Overall Tour Down Under

1st Young rider classification

2025
1st Young rider classification, Tour de France
2026
2nd Road race, UEC European Under-23 Championships
10th La Flèche Wallonne
