= Wilma Aintila =

Finnish cyclist

- Aintila in 2021

Personal information
- Born: 12 April 2004 (age 22) Kirkkonummi, Finland

Cycling career
- Sport: Cycling
- Current team: Canyon//SRAM
- Discipline: Road
- Role: Rider

Amateur teams
- 2021: Team Toni & Toni IK-32
- 2021: Restore Cycling Team
- 2022: Team Rytger Development

Professional teams
- 2023–2024: Lotto–Dstny Ladies
- 2025–: Canyon//SRAM Zondacrypto

Wilma Aintila (born 12 April 2004) is a Finnish professional racing cyclist, who currently rides for UCI Women's WorldTeam Canyon//SRAM.

== Major results ==
2019
National Junior Road Championships

2nd Road race
2nd Time trial

2021
National Junior Road Championships

2nd Road race
2nd Time trial

10th Time trial, UEC European Junior Road Championships
2022
6th Time trial, UEC European Junior Road Championships
2023
5th Time trial, UEC European Under-23 Road Championships
8th Overall Watersley Womens Challenge
2024
National Under-23 Road Championships

1st Time trial
2nd Road race

4th Grote Prijs CHW Beveren
2026
National Road Championships

2nd Time trial
3rd Road race
