= Canyon–SRAM =

German cycling team

Team information
- UCI code: CSZ
- Registered: Germany
- Founded: 2016
- Discipline: Road
- Status: UCI Women's Team (2016–2019); UCI Women's WorldTeam (2020–present)
- Bicycles: Canyon

Key personnel
- General manager: Ronny Lauke

Team name history
- 2016–2024 2025–2026 2026–: Canyon–SRAM; Canyon–SRAM Zondacrypto; Canyon–SRAM

Canyon–SRAM (stylised as Canyon//SRAM) is a professional women's cycling team that competes in elite women's road bicycle racing events, such as the UCI Women's World Tour. Ronny Lauke set the team up after the demise of his former team Velocio–SRAM.

== History ==
In September 2017, the team announced the signings of Alice Barnes, German road champion Lisa Klein and trainee Christa Riffel.

== Sponsors ==
The title sponsors of the team are German bike company Canyon Bicycles and US bike component manufacturer SRAM Corporation. At the start of the 2025 cycling season, Polish cryptocurrency company Zondacrypto became the third title sponsor, signing a three-year deal; however, this sponsorship was ended by the team in May 2026. The team's clothing is provided by Cologne-based Ryzon.

== Team roster ==
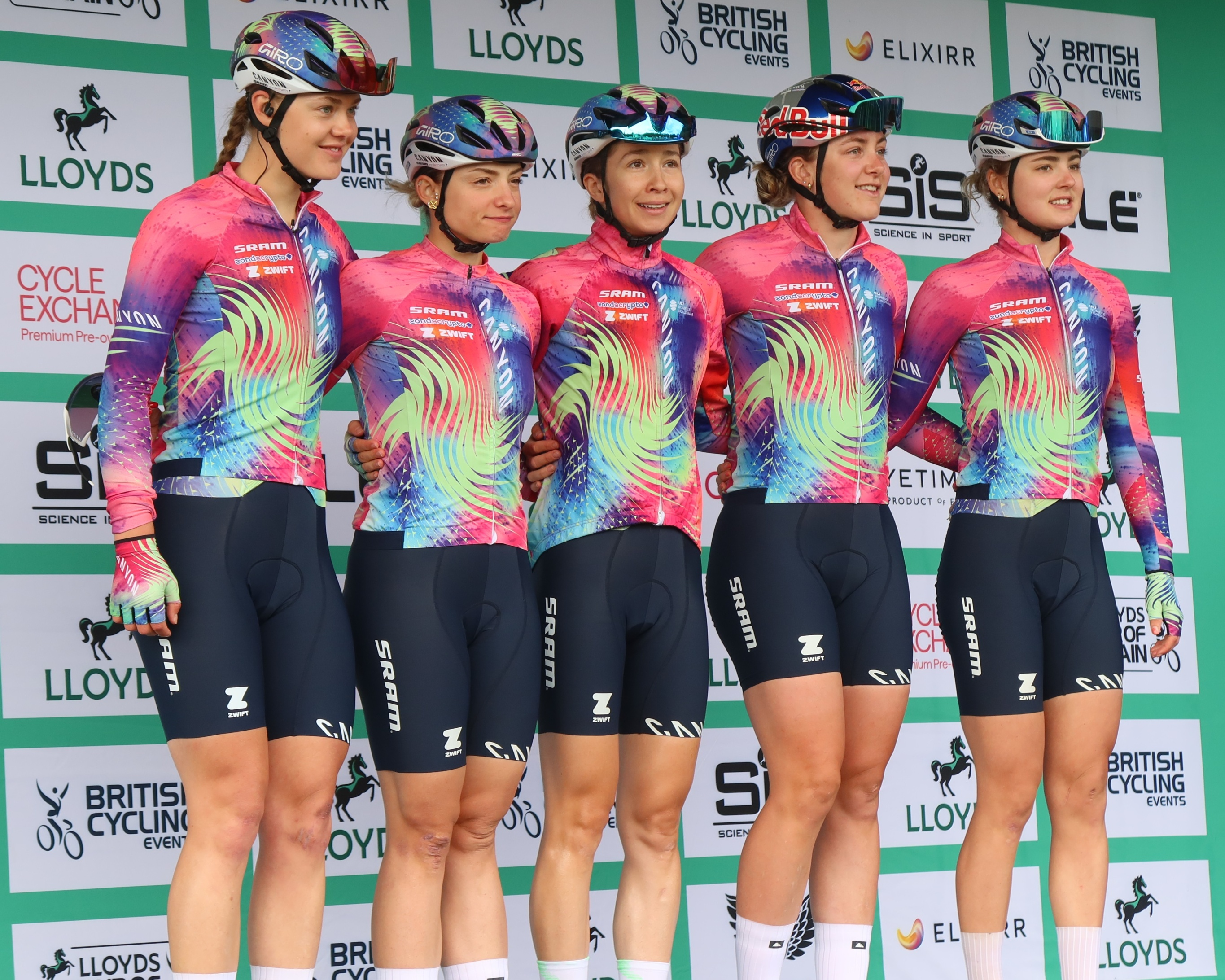
At the Tour of Britain in 2025.

As of 17 January 2025.

Rider	Date of birth
Wilma Aintila (FIN)	12 April 2004 (age 22)
Zoe Bäckstedt (GBR)	24 September 2004 (age 21)
Ricarda Bauernfeind (GER)	1 April 2000 (age 26)
Neve Bradbury (AUS)	11 April 2002 (age 24)
Chiara Consonni (ITA)	24 June 1999 (age 27)
Tiffany Cromwell (AUS)	6 July 1988 (age 38)
Justyna Czapla (GER)	24 January 2004 (age 22)
Chloé Dygert (USA)	1 January 1997 (age 29)
Rosa Maria Klöser (GER)	24 June 1996 (age 30)

Rider	Date of birth
Anastasiya Kolesava (BLR)	2 June 2000 (age 26)
Cecilie Uttrup Ludwig (DEN)	23 August 1995 (age 31)
Maria Martins (POR)	9 July 1999 (age 27)
Antonia Niedermaier (GER)	20 February 2003 (age 23)
Katarzyna Niewiadoma (POL)	29 September 1994 (age 31)
Soraya Paladin (ITA)	4 May 1993 (age 33)
Agnieszka Skalniak-Sójka (POL)	22 April 1997 (age 29)
Alice Towers (GBR)	12 October 2002 (age 23)
Maike van der Duin (NED)	12 September 2001 (age 24)

== Major wins ==
2016
Overall Ladies Tour of Qatar, Trixi Worrack

Teams classification

EPZ Omloop van Borsele, Barbara Guarischi
Stage 1 Gracia–Orlová, Alena Amialiusik
Stage 1 Auensteiner–Radsporttage, Lisa Brennauer
Stage 4 Giro d'Italia Femminile, Tiffany Cromwell
Overall Internationale Thüringen Rundfahrt der Frauen, Elena Cecchini
Stage 5 Boels Rental Ladies Tour, Lisa Brennauer
2017
Youth classification Santos Women's Tour, Alexis Ryan
Sprints classification Healthy Ageing Tour, Barbara Guarischi

Stage 3, Lisa Brennauer

Stage 3 Giro d'Italia Femminile, Hannah Barnes
Overall Thüringen Rundfahrt der Frauen, Lisa Brennauer

German rider classification, Lisa Brennauer
Teams classification
Prologue, Lisa Brennauer

Points classification Holland Ladies Tour, Lisa Brennauer

Mountain classification, Alexis Ryan
Stage 4, Lisa Brennauer
Combativity classification, Stage 5, Alexis Ryan

2018
Overall Semana Ciclista Valenciana, Hannah Barnes

Team classification
Stages 1 & 4, Hannah Barnes

Drentse Acht van Westerveld, Alexis Ryan
Trofeo Alfredo Binda-Comune di Cittiglio, Katarzyna Niewiadoma
Youth classification Healthy Ageing Tour, Lisa Klein
Prologue Festival Elsy Jacobs, Lisa Klein
Stage 2 Thüringen Rundfahrt der Frauen, Elena Cecchini
Stage 6 Thüringen Rundfahrt der Frauen, Alice Barnes
Youth classification BeNe Ladies Tour, Lisa Klein

Stage 2b (ITT), Trixi Worrack

Overall Tour Cycliste Féminin International de l'Ardèche, Katarzyna Niewiadoma

Mountains classification, Katarzyna Niewiadoma
Combination classification, Katarzyna Niewiadoma
Stage 1, Alexis Ryan
Stage 5, Katarzyna Niewiadoma

UCI Road World Championships – Women's team time trial
2019
Overall Healthy Ageing Tour, Lisa Klein
Youth classification Vuelta a Burgos Feminas, Ella Harris
Team classification Tour of California
Sprints classification Emakumeen Euskal Bira, Tanja Erath
Stage 4 Thüringen Rundfahrt der Frauen, Lisa Klein
Mountains classification The Women's Tour, Katarzyna Niewiadoma
Overall BeNe Ladies Tour, Lisa Klein
Team classification Colorado Classic
Stage 3 Boels Ladies Tour, Lisa Klein
2021
Stage 3 Setmana Ciclista Valenciana, Alice Barnes
Stage 1 Tour de Suisse Women, Elise Chabbey
Stage 2 Belgium Tour. Alena Amialiusik
Overall BeNe Ladies Tour

Stage 2b (ITT)

2022
Points classification Bloeizone Fryslân Tour, Alice Barnes

Sprints classification, Shari Bossuyt
Youth classification, Shari Bossuyt

Mountains classification Itzulia Women, Elise Chabbey
Durango-Durango Emakumeen Saria, Pauliena Rooijakkers
Team classification Tour de France Femmes
2023
Stage 2 2023 RideLondon Classique, Chloe Dygert
Stage 5 2023 Giro Donne, Antonia Niedermaier
Mountains classification Tour de France Femmes, Katarzyna Niewiadoma

Stage 5 Ricarda Bauernfeind

2024
Youth classification UAE Tour Women, Neve Bradbury
La Flèche Wallonne Féminine, Katarzyna Niewiadoma
Mountains classification Tour de Suisse, Elise Chabbey

Youth classification, Neve Bradbury
Stage 3 Neve Bradbury

Youth classification Giro d'Italia, Neve Bradbury

Stage 7 Neve Bradbury

Mountains classification Thüringen Ladies Tour, Katarzyna Niewiadoma
Overall Tour de France, Katarzyna Niewiadoma
2025
Baloise Ladies Tour, Zoe Bäckstedt

Prologue Zoe Bäckstedt
Stage 3 Zoe Bäckstedt
Stage 4 Zoe Bäckstedt

Tour de Pologne Women, Chiara Consonni

Stage 1 Chiara Consonni
Stage 3 Chiara Consonni

Stage 3, Simac Ladies Tour, Zoe Bäckstedt
Maryland Cycling Classic Women, Agnieszka Skalniak-Sójka
3rd Tour de France, Katarzyna Niewiadoma
Stage 3 Women's Tour Down Under, Chloe Dygert

== National champions ==
2016
Germany Time Trial, Trixi Worrack
Germany Road Race, Mieke Kröger
British Road Race, Hannah Barnes
2017
Germany Time Trial, Trixi Worrack
France MTB (XCO), Pauline Ferrand-Prévot
2018
France Cyclo-cross, Pauline Ferrand-Prévot
Belarus Time Trial, Alena Amialiusik
British Time Trial, Hannah Barnes
Belarus Road Race, Alena Amialiusik
Italy Time Trial, Elena Cecchini
Germany Omnium, Lisa Klein
2019
Israel Time Trial, Rotem Gafinovitz
Israel Road Race, Omer Shapira
British Time Trial, Alice Barnes
Germany Time Trial, Lisa Klein
European U23 Time Trial, Hannah Ludwig
2020
New Zealand U23 Time Trial, Ella Harris
Israel Time Trial, Omer Shapira
Israel Road Race, Omer Shapira
2021
USA Time Trial, Chloé Dygert
Israel Road Race, Omer Shapira
2022
Poland Time Trial, Agnieszka Skalniak-Sojka
Germany U23 Time Trial, Ricarda Bauernfeind
Germany U23 Road Race, Ricarda Bauernfeind
2023
Poland Time Trial, Agnieszka Skalniak-Sojka
USA Time Trial, Chloé Dygert
USA Road Race, Chloé Dygert
Germany U23 Time Trial, Antonia Niedermaier
2024
Germany U23 Time Trial, Justyna Czapla
2025
Poland Time Trial, Agnieszka Skalniak-Sójka
Britain Time Trial, Zoe Bäckstedt

== Canyon–SRAM Generation ==
Canyon–SRAM Generation
Team information
- UCI code: CSG
- Registered: Germany
- Founded: 2022
- Discipline: Road
- Status: UCI Women's Continental Team (2022–present)
- Bicycles: Canyon

Team name history
- 2022–2024 2025–2026 2026–: Canyon–SRAM Generation; Canyon–SRAM Zondacrypto Generation; Canyon–SRAM Generation

Canyon–SRAM Generation (stylised as Canyon//SRAM Generation) is a professional women's development team that competes in women's road bicycle racing events. The title sponsors are Canyon Bicycles and SRAM Corporation.

== Major results ==
2022
Tour de Lunsar, Fatima Deborah Conteh
Gran Premio Cidade de Pontevedra, Ricarda Bauernfeind
RideAfrique Accra Criterium, Fatima Deborah Conteh
Respect Ladies Race Slovakia, Ricarda Bauernfeind
Overall Tour Cycliste Féminin International de l'Ardèche , Antonia Niedermaier

Stages 4 & 5, Antonia Niedermaier

Gisaka Race, Valentine Nzayisenga

2023
Pan Arab Games Time Trial, Nesrine Houili

== Continental and national champions ==
2022
Germany U23 Time Trial, Ricarda Bauernfeind
Germany U23 Road Race, Ricarda Bauernfeind

2023
African U23 Time Trial, Nesrine Houili
Rwanda Time Trial, Diane Ingabire
Rwanda Road Race, Diane Ingabire
Paraguay Time Trial, Agua Marina Espínola
Jamaica Time Trial, Llori Sharpe
Paraguay Road Race, Agua Marina Espínola
Jamaica Road Race, Llori Sharpe
