= Tim Marsman =

Dutch cyclist (born 2000)

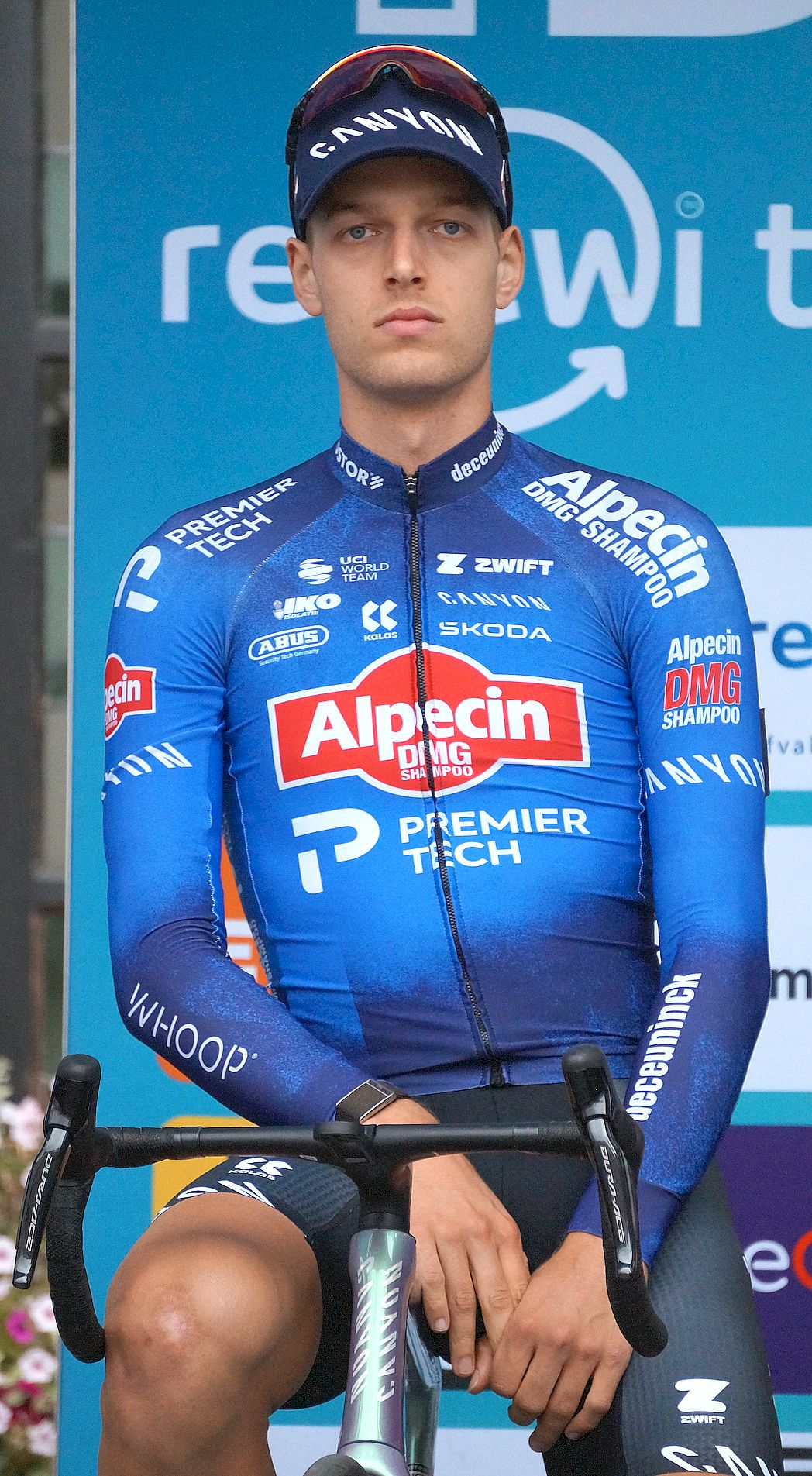
- Marsman in 2026

Personal information
- Born: 4 October 2000 (age 26) Hattem, Netherlands
- Height: 1.91 m (6 ft 3 in)
- Weight: 75 kg (165 lb)

Cycling career
- Sport: Cycling
- Current team: Alpecin–Premier Tech
- Discipline: Road
- Role: Rider

Amateur team
- 2017–2018: Forte U19 Cycling Team

Professional teams
- 2019–2024: Metec–TKH
- 2025: VolkerWessels Cycling Team
- 2026–: Alpecin–Premier Tech
Medal record
Cycling
Representing the Netherlands
European Championships
Bronze medal – third place	2022 Anadia	Under-23 team relay

Tim Marsman (born 18 October 2000) is a Dutch professional racing cyclist, who rides for UCI WorldTeam Alpecin–Premier Tech.

== Major results ==
2018
1st Omloop van Borsele
3rd Road race, National Junior Road Championships
4th Nokere Koerse voor Juniores
2021
8th Overall Flanders Tomorrow Tour
2022
2nd Overall Flanders Tomorrow Tour
3rd Team relay, UEC European Under-23 Road Championships
3rd Overall Okolo Jižních Čech
4th Overall Tour de Normandie

1st Stage 6

6th Overall Le Triptyque des Monts et Châteaux
9th Overall Kreiz Breizh Elites
2023
1st Overall Tour du Loir-et-Cher

1st Stage 1 (ITT)

2024
1st Omloop van Valkenswaard
9th Ster van Zwolle
2025
2nd Overall Tour du Loir-et-Cher
4th Overall Olympia's Tour

1st Stage 1 (ITT)

8th Dorpenomloop Rucphen
2026
10th Grand Prix de Fourmies
