= 2022 UCI Road World Championships =

Cycling world championships

- Location within New South Wales
- Venue: Wollongong, Australia
- Date: 18–25 September
- Coordinates: 34°25′38″S 150°53′38″E
- Events: 13

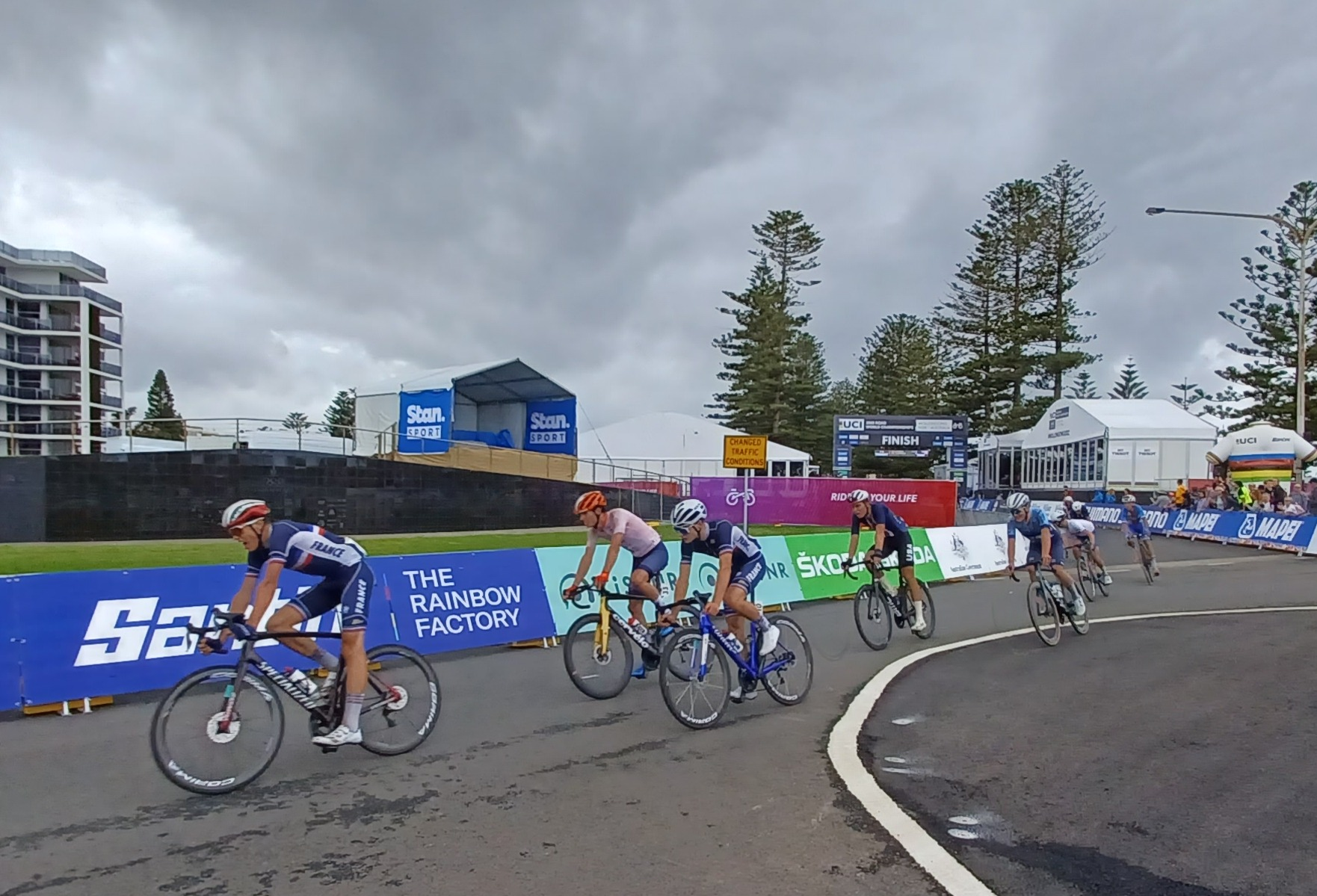
Riders in the men's junior road race just after passing the finish line

The 2022 UCI Road World Championships was the 95th edition of the UCI Road World Championships, the annual world championships for road bicycle racing. It was held between 18 and 25 September 2022 in Wollongong, New South Wales, Australia.

In February 2022, the UCI announced that a women's U23 category would be added to the road race and time trial events. The titles would be awarded from within the elite women's events, and separate races would be added from 2025.

On 1 March 2022, AusCycling announced that Russian and Belarusian teams would not be allowed to compete based on the International Olympic Committee's recommendation regarding the Russian invasion of Ukraine.

== Routes ==
In March 2022, the routes for the championships were announced.

The Elite Road races started in Helensburgh (about 30 km (19 mi) north of Wollongong) before tackling a 34 km (21 mi) loop around Mount Keira (climb length of 8.7 km (5.4 mi) with an average gradient of 5% and a maximum incline of 15%). The Elite Road races then took in laps of the Wollongong City Circuit. This 17.7 km (11.0 mi) finishing circuit had 220 m (720 ft) of climbing elevation each lap including the Mount Pleasant climb (climb length of 1.1 km (0.68 mi) with an average gradient of 7.7%, maximum incline of 14%).

In total, the Elite Women Road Race climbed 2,433 m (7,982 ft) elevation over a race distance of 164.3 km (102.1 mi) (1 Mount Keira loop, 6x Wollongong City Circuit) and the Elite Men Road Race climbed 3,945 m (12,943 ft) over a race distance of 266.9 km (165.8 mi) (1 Mount Keira loop, 12x Wollongong City Circuit). The other road races (Junior men, Junior women, U23 men) used laps of the Wollongong City Circuit for their events.

The time trial events used courses similar to the Wollongong City Circuit, albeit avoiding the Mount Pleasant climb. The Elite Women and Elite Men time trial events were over the same distance (34.2-kilometre (21.3-mile)).

== Schedule ==
All times listed below are for the local time – Australian Eastern Standard Time or UTC+10:00.

Date	Timings		Event	Location (start)	Location (finish)	Distance	
Individual time trial events
18 September	09:35	12:30	Elite women	Wollongong		34.2 km (21.3 mi)	
18 September	09:35	12:30	U23 Women	Wollongong		34.2 km (21.3 mi)	
18 September	13:30	17:00	Elite men	Wollongong		34.2 km (21.3 mi)	
19 September	13:20	17:00	U23 Men	Wollongong		28.8 km (17.9 mi)	
20 September	09:30	11:06	Junior women	Wollongong		14.1 km (8.8 mi)	
20 September	13:20	17:01	Junior men	Wollongong		28.8 km (17.9 mi)	
Mixed team relay
21 September	14:20	17:03	Mixed relay	Wollongong		28.2 km (17.5 mi)	
Road race events						Distance	Laps (Note: Mount Keira Loop (MKL) 34.2 km (21.3 mi) and Wollongong City Circuit (WCC) 16.9 km (10.5 mi).)
23 September	08:30	12:00	Junior men	Wollongong	Wollongong	135.6 km (84.3 mi)	8 WCC
23 September	13:00	17:16	U23 Men	Wollongong	Wollongong	169.8 km (105.5 mi)	10 WCC
24 September	08:00	09:53	Junior women	Wollongong	Wollongong	67.2 km (41.8 mi)	4 WCC
24 September	11:55	17:00	Elite women	Helensburgh	Wollongong	164.3 km (102.1 mi)	1 MKL; 6 WCC
24 September	11:55	17:00	U23 Women	Helensburgh	Wollongong	164.3 km (102.1 mi)	1 MKL; 6 WCC
25 September	10:00	16:51	Elite men	Helensburgh	Wollongong	266.9 km (165.8 mi)	1 MKL; 12 WCC

== Medal summary ==
=== Elite events ===
Event	Gold		Silver		Bronze	
Men's Events
Men's road race	Remco Evenepoel; Belgium	6h 16' 08"	Christophe Laporte; France	+ 2' 21"	Michael Matthews; Australia	+ 2' 21"
Men's time trial	Tobias Foss; Norway	40' 02.78"	Stefan Küng; Switzerland	+ 2.95"	Remco Evenepoel; Belgium	+ 9.16"
Women's Events
Women's road race	Annemiek van Vleuten; Netherlands	4h 24' 25"	Lotte Kopecky; Belgium	+ 1"	Silvia Persico; Italy	+ 1"
Women's time trial	Ellen van Dijk; Netherlands	44' 28.60"	Grace Brown; Australia	+ 12.73"	Marlen Reusser; Switzerland	+ 41.68"
Mixed Event
Mixed relay
Mixed relay	Switzerland; Stefan Bissegger; Elise Chabbey; Nicole Koller; Stefan Küng; Marlen Reusser; Mauro Schmid	33' 47.17"	Italy; Edoardo Affini; Elena Cecchini; Filippo Ganna; Vittoria Guazzini; Elisa Longo Borghini; Matteo Sobrero	+ 2.92"	Australia; Georgia Baker; Luke Durbridge; Alexandra Manly; Michael Matthews; Luke Plapp; Sarah Roy	+ 38.40"

=== Under-23 events ===
Event	Gold		Silver		Bronze	
Men's Under-23 Events
Men's under-23 road race	Yevgeniy Fedorov; Kazakhstan	3h 57' 08"	Mathias Vacek; Czech Republic	+ 1"	Søren Wærenskjold; Norway	+ 3"
Men's under-23 time trial	Søren Wærenskjold; Norway	34' 13.40"	Alec Segaert; Belgium	+ 16.34"	Leo Hayter; Great Britain	+ 24.16"
Women's Under-23 Events
Women's under-23 road race (Note: Raced within the Women's Elite Road Race)	Niamh Fisher-Black; New Zealand	4h 24' 26"	Pfeiffer Georgi; Great Britain	+ 12"	Ricarda Bauernfeind; Germany	+ 12"
Women's under-23 time trial (Note: Raced within the Women's Elite Time Trial)	Vittoria Guazzini; Italy	45' 20.71"	Shirin van Anrooij; Netherlands	+ 1' 48.74"	Ricarda Bauernfeind; Germany	+ 2' 17.37"

=== Junior events ===
Event	Gold		Silver		Bronze	
Men's Juniors Events
Men's junior road race	Emil Herzog; Germany	3h 11' 07"	António Morgado; Portugal	+ 0"	Vlad Van Mechelen; Belgium	+ 55"
Men's junior time trial	Joshua Tarling; Great Britain	34' 59.26"	Hamish McKenzie; Australia	+ 19.19"	Emil Herzog; Germany	+ 33.45"
Women's Juniors Events
Women's junior road race	Zoe Bäckstedt; Great Britain	1h 47' 05"	Eglantine Rayer; France	+ 2' 07"	Nienke Vinke; Netherlands	+ 2' 07"
Women's junior time trial	Zoe Bäckstedt; Great Britain	18' 26.78"	Justyna Czapla; Germany	+ 1' 35.78"	Febe Jooris; Belgium	+ 1' 48.98"

== Medal table ==
* Host nation (Australia)

Rank	Nation	Gold	Silver	Bronze	Total
1	Great Britain	3	1	1	5
2	Netherlands	2	1	1	4
3	Norway	2	0	1	3
4	Belgium	1	2	3	6
5	Germany	1	1	3	5
6	Italy	1	1	1	3
6	Switzerland	1	1	1	3
8	Kazakhstan	1	0	0	1
8	New Zealand	1	0	0	1
10	Australia*	0	2	2	4
11	France	0	2	0	2
12	Czech Republic	0	1	0	1
12	Portugal	0	1	0	1
Totals (13 entries)		13	13	13	39
