= 2022 European Road Championships =

28th European Road Cycling Championships

- Location within Germany
- Venue: Munich, Germany (elite); Anadia, Portugal (U23 & junior)
- Dates: 14–21 August 2022 (elite); 7–10 July 2022 (U23 & junior)
- Coordinates: 48°08′15″N 11°34′30″E
- Events: 14

The 2022 European Road Cycling Championships was the 28th running of the European Road Cycling Championships, held from 14 to 21 August 2022 in Munich, Germany for the elite events, and from 7 to 10 July 2022 in Anadia, Portugal for under-23 and junior events. The event consisted of a total of 6 road races and 8 time trials.

== Medal summary ==
=== Elite ===
Event	Gold		Silver		Bronze	
Men's Elite Events
Road race	Fabio Jakobsen; Netherlands	4h 38' 49"	Arnaud Démare; France	+ 0"	Tim Merlier; Belgium	+ 0"
Time trial	Stefan Bissegger; Switzerland	27:05.96	Stefan Küng; Switzerland	+0.53"	Filippo Ganna; Italy	+8.04"
Women's Elite Events
Road race	Lorena Wiebes; Netherlands	2h 59' 20"	Elisa Balsamo; Italy	+ 0"	Rachele Barbieri; Italy	+ 0"
Time trial	Marlen Reusser; Switzerland	30:59.90	Ellen van Dijk; Netherlands	+ 5.77"	Riejanne Markus; Netherlands	+ 27.88"

=== Under-23 ===
Event	Gold		Silver		Bronze	
Men's Under-23 Events
Road race	Felix Engelhardt; Germany	3h 37' 27"	Mathias Vacek; Czech Republic	+ 0"	Davide De Pretto; Italy	+ 0"
Time trial	Alec Segaert; Belgium	27' 25.73"	Fran Miholjević; Croatia	+ 50.20"	Eddy Le Huitouze; France	+ 51.76"
Women's Under-23 Events
Road race	Shirin van Anrooij; Netherlands	2h 57' 41"	Vittoria Guazzini; Italy	+ 11"	Fem van Empel; Netherlands	+ 11"
Time trial	Shirin van Anrooij; Netherlands	31' 34.12"	Vittoria Guazzini; Italy	+ 11.82"	Marie Le Net; France	+ 12.68"

=== Junior ===
Event	Gold		Silver		Bronze	
Men's Junior Events
Road race	Jan Christen; Switzerland	2h 42' 10"	Jørgen Nordhagen; Norway	+ 19"	Léo Bisiaux; France	+ 2' 02"
Time trial	Mathieu Kockelmann; Luxembourg	28' 06.04"	Jens Verbrugghe; Belgium	+ 19.34"	Emil Herzog; Germany	+ 35.80"
Women's Junior Events
Road race	Églantine Rayer; France	2h 33' 38"	Eleonora Ciabocco; Italy	+ 0"	Federica Venturelli; Italy	+ 2"
Time trial	Justyna Czapla; Germany	33' 30.39"	Églantine Rayer; France	+ 45.38"	Febe Jooris; Belgium	+ 48.40"

=== Mixed events ===
Event	Gold		Silver		Bronze	
Under-23 team time trial	Germany; Maurice Ballerstedt; Tobias Buck-Gramcko; Ricarda Bauernfeind; Linda Riedmann	58' 26"	Switzerland; Fabio Christen; Arnaud Tendon; Jasmin Liechti; Annika Liehner	+ 1' 16"	Netherlands; Lars Boven; Tim Marsman; Mischa Bredewold; Femke Gerritse	+ 1' 49"
Junior team time trial	Italy; Valentina Zanzi; Alice Toniolli; Alessandro Cattani; Nicolas Milesi	1h 02' 20"	Germany; Louis Leidert; Fabian Wünstel; Hannah Kunz; Jette Simon	+ 3"	Estonia; Olivier Rüster; Lauri Tamm; Elisabeth Ebras; Laura Sander	+ 42"

== Medal table ==
* Host nation (Germany & Portugal)

Rank	Nation	Gold	Silver	Bronze	Total
1	Netherlands (NED)	4	1	3	8
2	Switzerland (SUI)	3	2	0	5
3	Germany (GER)*	3	1	1	5
4	Italy (ITA)	1	4	4	9
5	France (FRA)	1	2	3	6
6	Belgium (BEL)	1	1	2	4
7	Luxembourg (LUX)	1	0	0	1
8	Croatia (CRO)	0	1	0	1
8	Czech Republic (CZE)	0	1	0	1
8	Norway (NOR)	0	1	0	1
11	Estonia (EST)	0	0	1	1
Totals (11 entries)		14	14	14	42
