= Baloise Ladies Tour =

Women's cycling race in Belgium and the Netherlands

Race details
- Date: July
- Region: Netherlands
- Discipline: Road
- Type: Stage race
- Web site: www.baloiseladiestour.com

History
- First edition: 2014
- Editions: 11 (as of 2025)
- First winner: Emma Johansson (SWE)
- Most wins: Jolien D'Hoore (BEL); Lisa Klein (GER); Marianne Vos (NED)
- Most recent: Zoe Bäckstedt (GBR)

The Baloise Ladies Tour (formerly the BeNe Ladies Tour) is a women's staged cycle race which takes place in Belgium and the Netherlands and is currently rated by the UCI as category 2.1.

== Overall winners ==
Year	Country	Rider	Team
2014	Sweden	Emma Johansson	Orica–AIS
2015	Belgium	Jolien D'Hoore	Wiggle–Honda
2016	Belgium	Jolien D'Hoore	Wiggle High5
2017	Netherlands	Marianne Vos	WM3 Energie
2018	Netherlands	Marianne Vos	WaowDeals Pro Cycling
2019	Germany	Lisa Klein	Canyon//SRAM
2020	No race due to COVID-19 pandemic		
2021	Germany	Lisa Klein	Canyon//SRAM
2022	Netherlands	Ellen van Dijk	Trek–Segafredo
2023	Netherlands	Lucinda Brand	Lidl–Trek
2024	Netherlands	Lorena Wiebes	Team SD Worx–Protime
2025	Great Britain	Zoe Bäckstedt	Canyon//SRAM Zondacrypto

=== Classification jerseys ===
General classification leader
Points classification leader
Youth classification leader
