= Églantine Rayer =

French cyclist (born 2004)

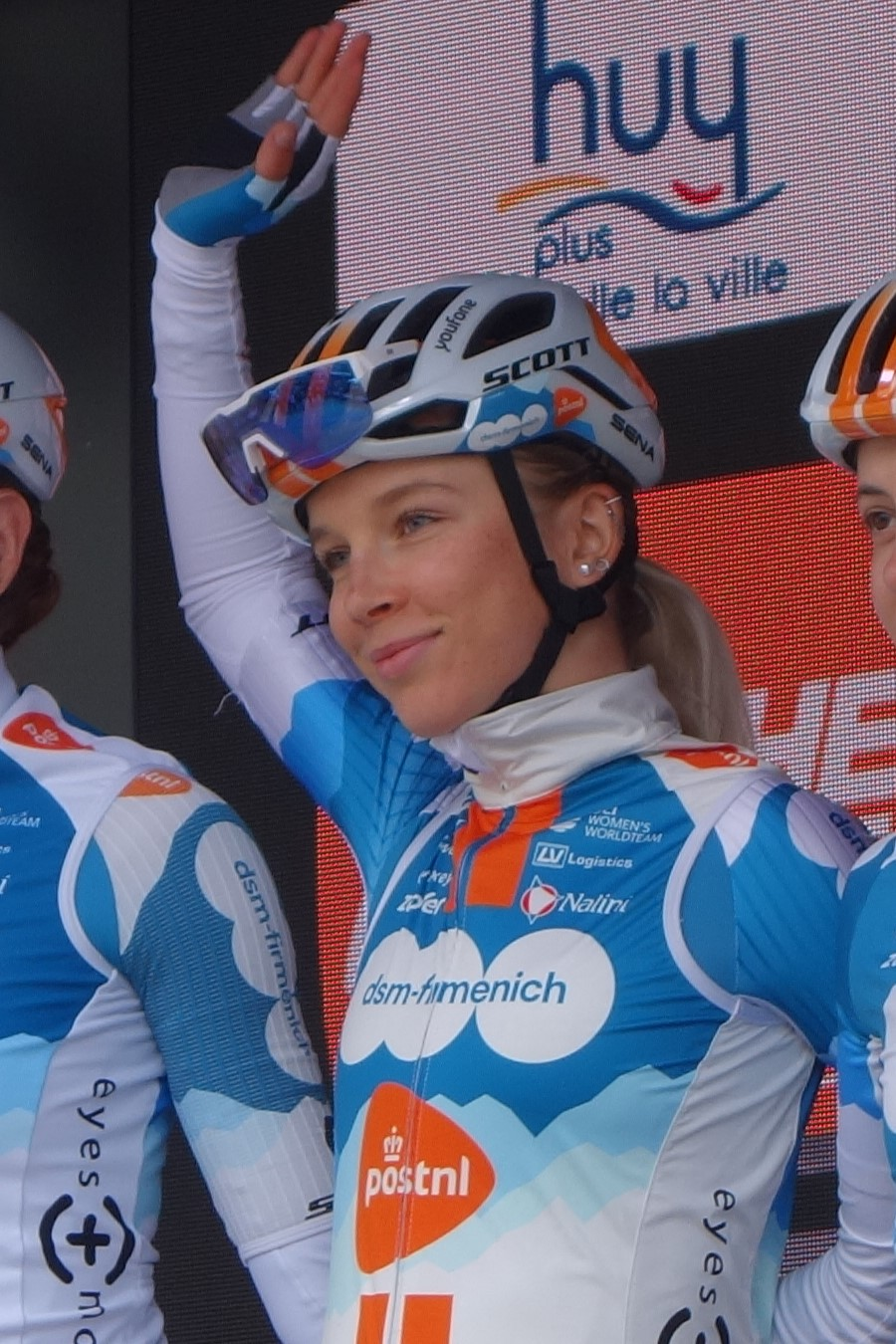
- Rayer in 2024

Personal information
- Born: 12 June 2004 (age 22) La Ferté Macé, France

Cycling career
- Sport: Cycling
- Current team: FDJ United–Suez
- Discipline: Road
- Role: Rider

Amateur team
- 2022: US Pétruvienne

Professional teams
- 2023–2024: Team DSM
- 2025–: FDJ–Suez
Medal record
Representing France
Women's road bicycle racing
World Championships
Silver medal – second place	2022 Wollongong	Junior road race
European Championships
Gold medal – first place	2022 Anadia	Junior road race
Silver medal – second place	2022 Anadia	Junior time trial
Bronze medal – third place	2021 Trentino	Junior road race

Églantine Rayer (born 12 June 2004) is a French professional racing cyclist, who currently rides for UCI Women's WorldTeam FDJ United–Suez.

== Major results ==
2021
National Junior Road Championships

1st Road race
1st Time trial

European Junior Road Championships

3rd Road race
6th Time trial

3rd Piccolo Trofeo Alfredo Binda
4th Overall Bizkaikoloreak

1st Mountains classification

UCI World Junior Road Championships

7th Time trial
8th Road race

10th Overall Tour du Gévaudan Occitanie
2022
European Junior Road Championships

1st Road race
2nd Time trial

National Junior Road Championships

1st Time trial
4th Road race

1st Overall Tour du Gévaudan Occitanie

1st Mountains classification
1st Stage 1

1st Chrono des Nations Juniors
2nd Road race, UCI World Junior Road Championships
2nd Alpes Gresivaudan Classic
3rd Overall Bizkaikoloreak
7th Piccolo Trofeo Alfredo Binda
8th Overall Omloop van Borsele
2023
National Under-23 Road Championships

1st Time trial
2nd Road race

7th Time trial, European Under-23 Road Championships
8th Classic Lorient Agglomération
9th Overall Tour of Scandinavia
10th Overall Tour de Suisse
