= Justyna Czapla =

German cyclist (born 2004)

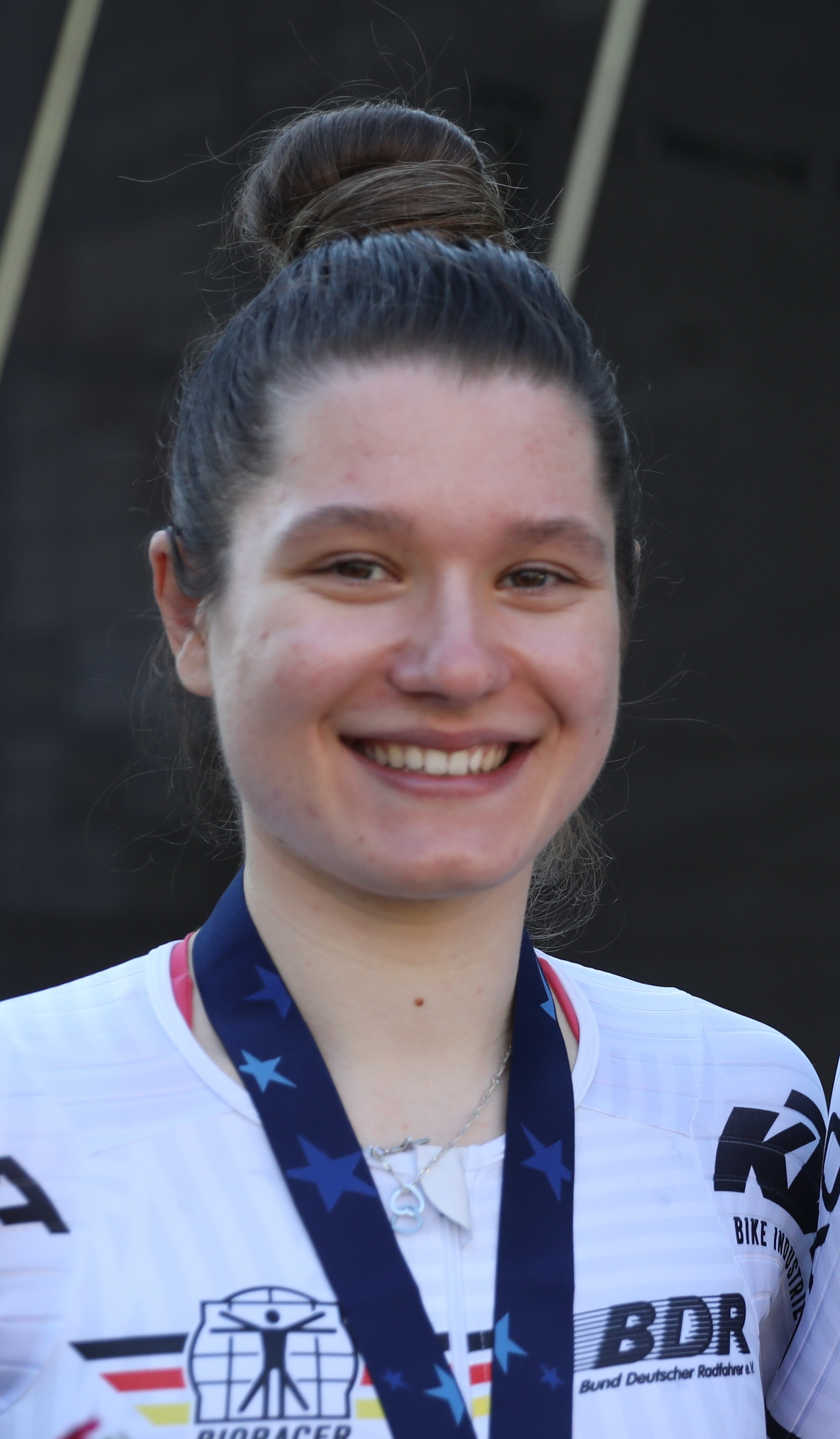
- Czapla at the 2024 UEC European Track Championships

Personal information
- Born: 24 January 2004 (age 22) Ruda Śląska, Poland

Cycling career
- Sport: Cycling
- Current team: Canyon//SRAM
- Disciplines: Road; Track
- Role: Rider

Professional teams
- 2023: Canyon–SRAM Generation
- 2024–: Canyon//SRAM
Medal record
Representing Germany
Women's road cycling
UCI Road World Championships
Silver medal – second place	2022 Wollongong	Junior time trial
European Road Championships
Gold medal – first place	2022 Anadia	Junior time trial
Women's track cycling
UCI Junior Track Cycling World Championships
Bronze medal – third place	2022 Tel Aviv	Team pursuit
UEC European Track Championships
Bronze medal – third place	2021 Apeldoorn	Junior team pursuit
Silver medal – second place	2022 Anadia	Junior team pursuit
Silver medal – second place	2022 Anadia	Junior Madison
Bronze medal – third place	2024 Cottbus	Under-23 Madison

Justyna Czapla (born 24 January 2004) is a German professional road and track cyclist who rides for Canyon//SRAM. She is a European junior champion, German junior champion, and three-time German under-23 champion in the time trial.

== Career ==
After a successful junior career, including a European junior time trial title and a silver medal at the UCI Junior World time trial championships, Czapla joined WorldTour team Canyon//SRAM for the 2024 season.

Czapla made her Grand Tour debut at the 2025 La Vuelta Femenina, where cyclingnews.com called her one of the "rising stars" of the race. She was the best-placed under-23 rider after the stage 1 team time trial.

At the 2026 German National Road Race Championships, Czapla led the race solo for 65 kilometres (40 mi), before getting caught with 15 kilometres (9.3 mi) to go and finishing third behind Franziska Koch and Liane Lippert.

In May 2026, Czapla extended her contract with Canyon//SRAM through 2028.

== Major results ==
=== Road ===
2022
1st Time trial, European Junior Championships
National Junior Championships

1st Road race
1st Time trial

2nd Time trial, UCI Junior World Championships
3rd Overall Watersley Ladies Challenge
2023
3rd Time trial, National Under-23 Championships
8th reVolta
10th La Classique Morbihan
2024
1st Time trial, National Under-23 Championships
2025
1st Time trial, National Under-23 Championships
4th Road race, National Championships
UCI World Championships

5th Mixed team relay
7th Under-23 time trial

6th Time trial, European Under-23 Championships
2026
1st Time trial, National Under-23 Championships
3rd Road race, National Championships

=== Track ===
2021
3rd Team pursuit, European Junior Championships
2022
European Junior Championships

2nd Team pursuit
2nd Madison

3rd Team pursuit, UCI Junior World Championships
2024
3rd Madison, European Under-23 Championships
