= 2024 RideLondon Classique =

2024 Ford RideLondon Classique
2024 UCI Women's World Tour, race 18 of 27
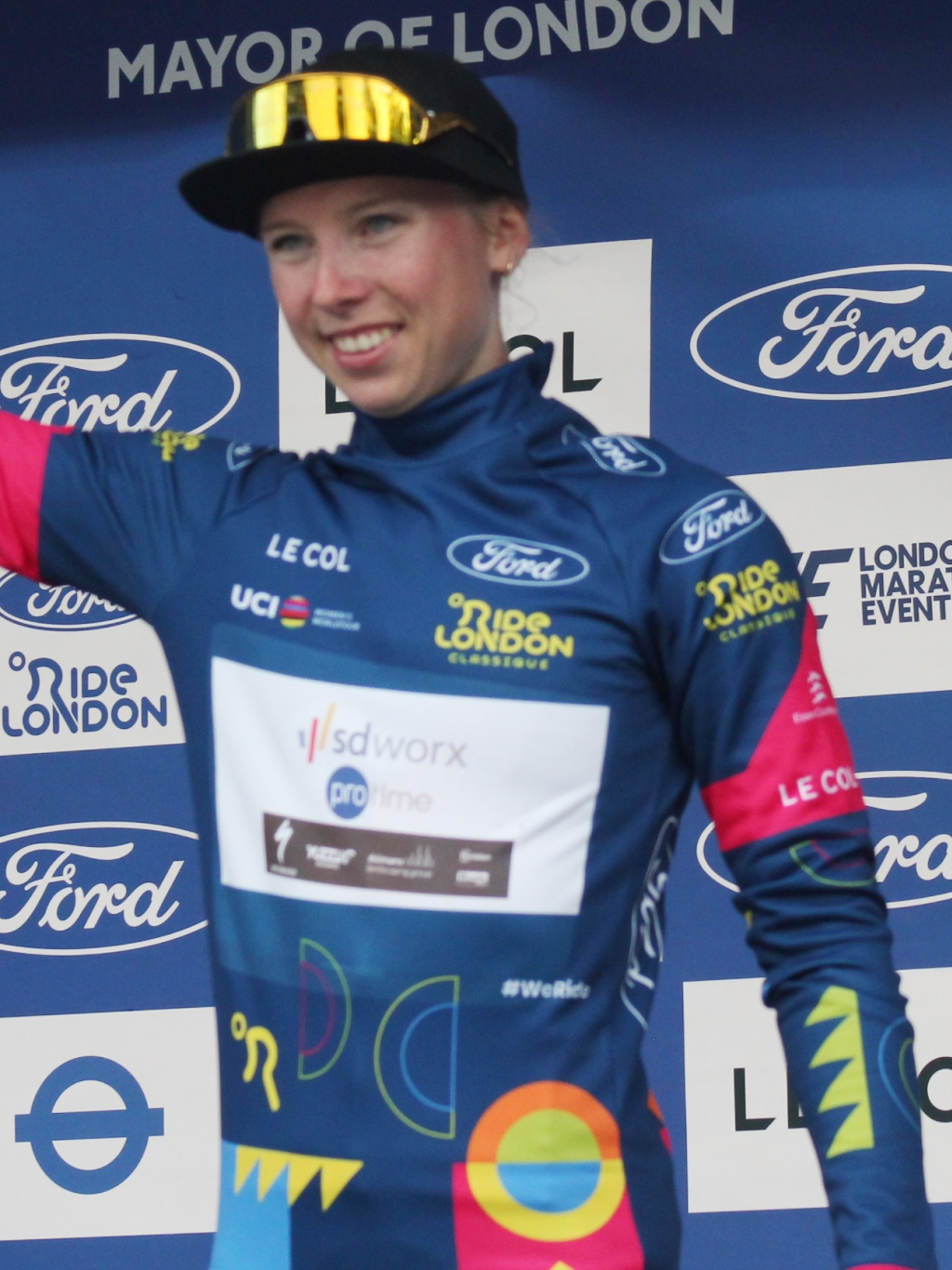
- Lorena Wiebes, race winner

Race details
- Dates: 24–26 May 2024
- Stages: 3
- Distance: 393 km (244.2 mi)
- Winning time: 9h 48' 03"

Results
Jersey awarded to the overall winner	Winner	Lorena Wiebes (NED)	(Team SD Worx–Protime)
	Second	Charlotte Kool (NED)	(Team dsm–firmenich PostNL)
	Third	Lotte Kopecky (BEL)	(Team SD Worx–Protime)
Jersey awarded to the mountains classification winner	Mountains	Rebecca Koerner (DEN)	(Uno-X Mobility)
Jersey awarded to the youth classification winner	Youth	Eleonora Gasparrini (ITA)	(UAE Team ADQ)
Jersey awarded to the sprints classification winner	Sprints	Lorena Wiebes (NED)	(Team SD Worx–Protime)
	Team	(Germany) Ceratizit–WNT Pro Cycling	

The 2024 Ford RideLondon Classique was a British women's cycle stage held in Essex and London, as part of the UCI Women's World Tour. Taking place between 24 and 26 May, the race was the tenth edition of the RideLondon Classique, part of the RideLondon cycling festival.

The race was won by Dutch rider Lorena Wiebes of Team SD Worx–Protime, with Wiebes winning all three stages as well as the sprints classification.

== Teams ==
Ten UCI Women's WorldTeams and ten UCI Women's Continental Teams took part in the race.

UCI Women's WorldTeams

- AG Insurance–Soudal
- Canyon–SRAM
- Ceratizit–WNT Pro Cycling
- Human Powered Health
- Lidl–Trek
- Liv AlUla Jayco
- Team dsm–firmenich PostNL
- Team SD Worx–Protime
- UAE Team ADQ
- Uno-X Mobility
- Visma–Lease a Bike

UCI Women's Continental Teams

- ARA Skip Capital
- Bepink–Bongioanni
- DAS–Hutchinson–Brother–UK
- Doltcini O'Shea
- Lifeplus Wahoo
- St. Michel–Mavic–Auber93
- Team Coop–Repsol
- Torelli
- VolkerWessels Women Cyclingteam

== Route and stages ==
Stage characteristics
Stage	Date	Course	Distance	Type	Stage winner
1	24 May	Saffron Walden to Colchester	159.2 km (98.9 mi)	Flat stage	Lorena Wiebes (NED)
2	25 May	Maldon to Maldon	142.6 km (88.6 mi)	Flat stage	Lorena Wiebes (NED)
3	26 May	London to London	91.2 km (56.7 mi)	Flat stage	Lorena Wiebes (NED)
Total			393 km (244 mi)		

== Stages ==
=== Stage 1 ===
24 May 2024 — Saffron Walden to Colchester, 159.2 km (98.9 mi)

Stage 1 Result
Rank	Rider	Team	Time
1	Lorena Wiebes (NED)	Team SD Worx–Protime	4h 06' 27"
2	Letizia Paternoster (ITA)	Liv AlUla Jayco	+ 0"
3	Clara Copponi (FRA)	Lidl–Trek	+ 0"
4	Maria Giulia Confalonieri (ITA)	Uno-X Mobility	+ 0"
5	Charlotte Kool (NED)	Team dsm–firmenich PostNL	+ 0"
6	Margot Vanpachtenbeke (BEL)	VolkerWessels Women Cyclingteam	+ 0"
7	Lotte Kopecky (BEL)	Team SD Worx–Protime	+ 0"
8	Eleonora Camilla Gasparrini (ITA)	UAE Team ADQ	+ 0"
9	Mylène de Zoete (NED)	Ceratizit–WNT Pro Cycling	+ 0"
10	Soraya Paladin (ITA)	Canyon–SRAM	+ 0"

General classification after Stage 1
Rank	Rider	Team	Time
1	Lorena Wiebes (NED)	Team SD Worx–Protime	4h 06' 16"
2	Letizia Paternoster (ITA)	Liv AlUla Jayco	+ 5"
3	Clara Copponi (FRA)	Lidl–Trek	+ 7"
4	Maria Giulia Confalonieri (ITA)	Uno-X Mobility	+ 11"
5	Charlotte Kool (NED)	Team dsm–firmenich PostNL	+ 11"
6	Margot Vanpachtenbeke (BEL)	VolkerWessels Women Cyclingteam	+ 11"
7	Lotte Kopecky (BEL)	Team SD Worx–Protime	+ 11"
8	Eleonora Camilla Gasparrini (ITA)	UAE Team ADQ	+ 11"
9	Mylène de Zoete (NED)	Ceratizit–WNT Pro Cycling	+ 11"
10	Soraya Paladin (ITA)	Canyon–SRAM	+ 11"

=== Stage 2 ===
25 May 2024 — Maldon to Maldon, 142.6 km (88.6 mi)

Stage 2 Result
Rank	Rider	Team	Time
1	Lorena Wiebes (NED)	Team SD Worx–Protime	3h 33' 26"
2	Charlotte Kool (NED)	Team dsm–firmenich PostNL	+ 0"
3	Lotte Kopecky (BEL)	Team SD Worx–Protime	+ 0"
4	Letizia Paternoster (ITA)	Liv AlUla Jayco	+ 0"
5	Soraya Paladin (ITA)	Canyon–SRAM	+ 0"
6	Maria Giulia Confalonieri (ITA)	Uno-X Mobility	+ 0"
7	Eleonora Camilla Gasparrini (ITA)	UAE Team ADQ	+ 0"
8	Pfeiffer Georgi (GBR)	Team dsm–firmenich PostNL	+ 0"
9	Clara Copponi (FRA)	Lidl–Trek	+ 0"
10	Roxane Fournier (FRA)	St. Michel–Mavic–Auber93	+ 0"

General classification after Stage 2
Rank	Rider	Team	Time
1	Lorena Wiebes (NED)	Team SD Worx–Protime	7h 39' 26"
2	Lotte Kopecky (BEL)	Team SD Worx–Protime	+ 20"
3	Letizia Paternoster (ITA)	Liv AlUla Jayco	+ 21"
4	Charlotte Kool (NED)	Team dsm–firmenich PostNL	+ 21"
5	Soraya Paladin (ITA)	Canyon–SRAM	+ 22"
6	Clara Copponi (FRA)	Lidl–Trek	+ 23"
7	Eleonora Camilla Gasparrini (ITA)	UAE Team ADQ	+ 25"
8	Maria Giulia Confalonieri (ITA)	Uno-X Mobility	+ 27"
9	Roxane Fournier (FRA)	St. Michel–Mavic–Auber93	+ 27"
10	Ally Wollaston (NZL)	AG Insurance–Soudal	+ 27"

=== Stage 3 ===
26 May 2024 — London to London, 91.2 km (56.7 mi)

Stage 3 Result
Rank	Rider	Team	Time
1	Lorena Wiebes (NED)	Team SD Worx–Protime	2h 08' 47"
2	Charlotte Kool (NED)	Team dsm–firmenich PostNL	+ 0"
3	Lotte Kopecky (BEL)	Team SD Worx–Protime	+ 0"
4	Sofie van Rooijen (NED)	VolkerWessels Women Cyclingteam	+ 0"
5	Maike van der Duin (NED)	Canyon–SRAM	+ 0"
6	Clara Copponi (FRA)	FDJ–Suez	+ 0"
7	Mylène de Zoete (NED)	Ceratizit–WNT Pro Cycling	+ 0"
8	Letizia Paternoster (ITA)	Liv AlUla Jayco	+ 0"
9	Kristýna Burlová (CZE)	Lifeplus Wahoo	+ 0"
10	Anniina Ahtosalo (FIN)	Uno-X Mobility	+ 0"

General classification after Stage 3
Rank	Rider	Team	Time
1	Lorena Wiebes (NED)	Team SD Worx–Protime	9h 48' 03"
2	Charlotte Kool (NED)	Team dsm–firmenich PostNL	+ 25"
3	Lotte Kopecky (BEL)	Team SD Worx–Protime	+ 26"
4	Letizia Paternoster (ITA)	Liv AlUla Jayco	+ 26"
6	Clara Copponi (FRA)	Lidl–Trek	+ 30"
5	Soraya Paladin (ITA)	Canyon–SRAM	+ 32"
7	Ally Wollaston (NZL)	AG Insurance–Soudal	+ 34"
8	Eleonora Camilla Gasparrini (ITA)	UAE Team ADQ	+ 35"
9	Roxane Fournier (FRA)	St. Michel–Mavic–Auber93	+ 37"
10	Maria Giulia Confalonieri (ITA)	Uno-X Mobility	+ 37"

== Classification leadership table ==
Classification leadership by stage
Stage	Winner	General classification	Sprints classification	Mountains classification	Young rider classification	British rider classification	Team classification
1	Lorena Wiebes	Lorena Wiebes	Lorena Wiebes	Rebecca Koerner	Eleonora Camilla Gasparrini	Monica Greenwood	Liv AlUla Jayco
2	Lorena Wiebes	Lorena Wiebes	Lorena Wiebes	Rebecca Koerner	Eleonora Camilla Gasparrini	Elizabeth Deignan	Ceratizit–WNT Pro Cycling
3	Lorena Wiebes	Lorena Wiebes	Lorena Wiebes	Rebecca Koerner	Eleonora Camilla Gasparrini	Elizabeth Deignan	Ceratizit–WNT Pro Cycling
Final		Lorena Wiebes	Lorena Wiebes	Rebecca Koerner	Eleonora Camilla Gasparrini	Elizabeth Deignan	Ceratizit–WNT Pro Cycling

== Classification standings ==
Legend
Denotes the winner of the general classification	Denotes the winner of the mountains classification
Denotes the winner of the points classification	Denotes the winner of the young rider classification

=== General classification ===
Final general classification (1–10)
Rank	Rider	Team	Time
1	Lorena Wiebes (NED)	Team SD Worx–Protime	9h 48' 03"
2	Charlotte Kool (NED)	Team dsm–firmenich PostNL	+ 25"
3	Lotte Kopecky (BEL)	Team SD Worx–Protime	+ 26"
4	Letizia Paternoster (ITA)	Liv AlUla Jayco	+ 26"
5	Clara Copponi (FRA)	Lidl–Trek	+ 30"
6	Soraya Paladin (ITA)	Canyon–SRAM	+ 32"
7	Ally Wollaston (NZL)	AG Insurance–Soudal	+ 34"
8	Eleonora Camilla Gasparrini (ITA)	UAE Team ADQ	+ 35"
9	Roxane Fournier (FRA)	St. Michel–Mavic–Auber93	+ 37"
10	Maria Giulia Confalonieri (ITA)	Uno-X Mobility	+ 37"

=== Points classification ===
Final points classification (1–10)
Rank	Rider	Team	Points
1	Lorena Wiebes (NED)	Team SD Worx–Protime	48
2	Charlotte Kool (NED)	Team dsm–firmenich PostNL	30
3	Letizia Paternoster (ITA)	Liv AlUla Jayco	27
4	Lotte Kopecky (BEL)	Team SD Worx–Protime	22
5	Clara Copponi (FRA)	Lidl–Trek	19
6	Maria Giulia Confalonieri (ITA)	Uno-X Mobility	14
7	Margot Vanpachtenbeke (BEL)	VolkerWessels Women Cyclingteam	10
8	Soraya Paladin (ITA)	Canyon–SRAM	7
9	Eleonora Camilla Gasparrini (ITA)	UAE Team ADQ	7
10	Sofie van Rooijen (NED)	VolkerWessels Women Cyclingteam	7

=== Mountains classification ===
Final mountains classification (1–8)
Rank	Rider	Team	Points
1	Rebecca Koerner (DEN)	Uno-X Mobility	9
2	Lorena Wiebes (NED)	Team SD Worx–Protime	7
3	Lea Lin Teutenberg (GER)	Ceratizit–WNT Pro Cycling	6
4	Soraya Paladin (ITA)	Canyon–SRAM	5
5	Lotte Kopecky (BEL)	Team SD Worx–Protime	3
6	Eleonora Camilla Gasparrini (ITA)	UAE Team ADQ	2
7	Elizabeth Deignan (GBR)	Lidl–Trek	2
8	April Tacey (GBR)	Team Coop–Repsol	2

=== Young rider classification ===
Final young rider classification (1–10)
Rank	Rider	Team	Time
1	Eleonora Camilla Gasparrini (ITA)	UAE Team ADQ	9h 48' 38"
2	Linda Riedmann (GER)	Visma–Lease a Bike	+ 6"
3	Kristýna Burlová (CZE)	Lifeplus Wahoo	+ 10"
4	Lucinda Stewart (AUS)	ARA Skip Capital	+ 10"
5	Andrea Casagranda (ITA)	Bepink–Bongioanni	+ 10"
6	Alice Towers (GBR)	Canyon–SRAM	+ 10"
7	Fleur Moors (BEL)	Lidl–Trek	+ 15"
8	Caoimhe O'Brien (IRL)	DAS–Hutchinson–Brother–UK	+ 25"
9	Ilse Pluimers (NED)	AG Insurance–Soudal	+ 35"
10	Anniina Ahtosalo (FIN)	Uno-X Mobility	+ 2' 27"

=== British rider classification ===
Final British rider classification (1–10)
Rank	Rider	Team	Time
1	Elizabeth Deignan (GBR)	Lidl–Trek	9h 48' 46"
2	Alice Towers (GBR)	Canyon–SRAM	+ 2"
3	Jessica Finney (GBR)	Doltcini O'Shea	+ 7"
4	Pfeiffer Georgi (GBR)	Team dsm–firmenich PostNL	+ 9"
5	Alice Wood (GBR)	Human Powered Health	+ 3' 14"
6	Madelaine Leech (GBR)	Lifeplus Wahoo	+ 3' 40"
7	Elinor Barker (GBR)	Uno-X Mobility	+ 4' 23"
8	Monica Greenwood (GBR)	Team Coop–Repsol	+ 4' 43"
9	Elynor Bäckstedt (GBR)	Lidl–Trek	+ 5' 01"
10	Kim Baptista (GBR)	Torelli	+ 5' 56"

=== Team classification ===
Final team classification (1–10)
Rank	Team	Time
1	(Germany) Ceratizit–WNT Pro Cycling	29h 26' 12"
2	(Germany) Canyon–SRAM	+ 0"
3	(France) St. Michel–Mavic–Auber93	+ 4"
4	(United States) Lidl–Trek	+ 9"
5	(Norway) Uno-X Mobility	+ 29"
6	(Netherlands) Visma–Lease a Bike	+ 33"
7	(Australia) Liv AlUla Jayco	+ 37"
8	(Belgium) AG Insurance–Soudal	+ 44"
9	(Netherlands) Team dsm–firmenich PostNL	+ 1' 27"
10	(Netherlands) Team SD Worx–Protime	+ 2' 35"
