= Hanna Johansson (cyclist) =

Swedish cyclist (born 1985)

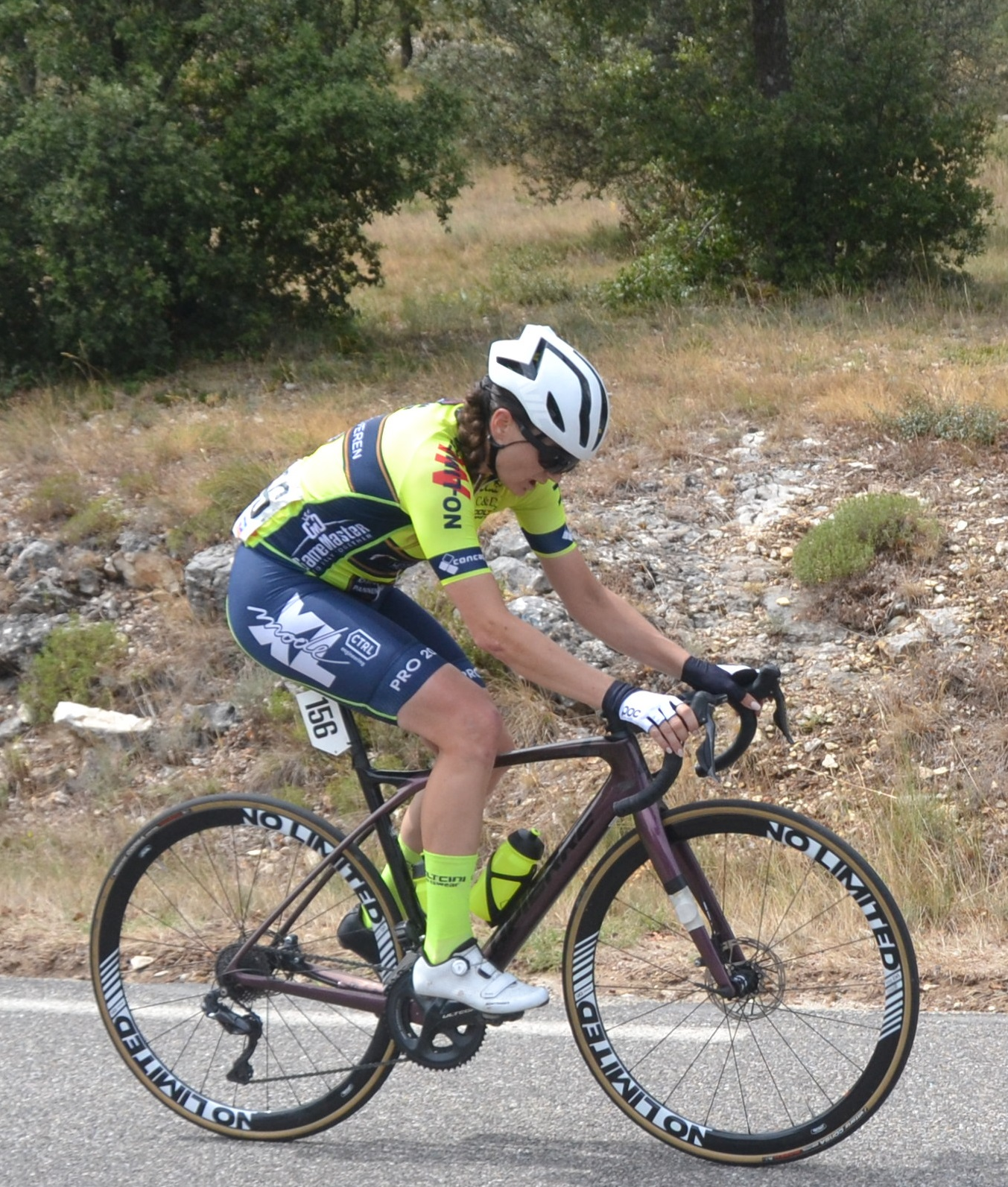

Personal information
- Born: 7 February 1985 (age 41)

Cycling career
- Sport: Cycling
- Current team: VC Morteau-Montbenoît
- Discipline: Road
- Role: Rider

Amateur teams
- 2018: Škoda Cycling Team
- 2021–: VC Morteau-Montbenoît

Professional teams
- 2020: Multum Accountants–LSK Ladies
- 2022: Lviv Cycling Team
- 2023: Torelli

Hanna Johansson (born 7 February 1985) is a Swedish racing cyclist, who currently rides for Irish team Torelli. In October 2020, she rode in the 2020 Tour of Flanders for Women's race in Belgium.

In 2023, she won her first UCI Women's World Tour jersey by winning the Mountains classification at the 2023 RideLondon Classique.
