= Jim Papadopoulos =

- Born: 1954 (age 70–71)
- Occupation(s): engineer, inventor
- Notable work: Study of bicycle dynamics

Jim Papadopoulos is an English born American engineer, specializing in bicycle science. He has contributed work in the field of bicycle stability to bicycle producers and research foundations alike.

He's first opportunity to exclusively study bicycles came after 1975, he was hired by friend and professional acquaintance Andy Ruina as a post-doc at Cornell University. There he was able to study bicycle stability primarily from funding from Dahon and Moulton.

Papadopoulos formerly held a teaching position at Northeastern University Boston.
