= Andrew Ritchie (inventor) =

British inventor and entrepreneur (born c. 1947)

Andrew Ritchie MBE
- Ritchie in 2012
- Born: 1947 (age 78–79)
- Education: Trinity College, Cambridge
- Occupations: Inventor, entrepreneur
- Notable work: Brompton Bicycle

Andrew Ritchie (born c. 1947) is the inventor of the Brompton folding bicycle, and has guided the Brompton Bicycle company to become the largest bicycle manufacturer in the UK.

In 1995 he received the Queen's Award for Export and in 2009 the Prince Philip Designers Prize. In the Queen's Birthday Honours of 21 April 2010, the company was awarded two Queen's Awards for Enterprise – in the Innovation and International Trade categories. News Distribution Services - Another great year for the Queen's Awards for Enterprise Brompton has now produced well over 1.100,000 bicycles and in 2008 achieved 25,000 units for export to markets such as the Netherlands, America, Germany, Japan and Scandinavia. A Cambridge engineering graduate, Ritchie was working as a landscape gardener in London when, in 1976, he conceived the idea for a folding bike, which he subsequently named after the Brompton Oratory. His design won the 'Best Product' award against an international field at the Cyclex exhibition in April 1987. After devoting his life to the development and manufacture of the bike, he began to step back from the day-to-day running of the company in 2005, reduced his shareholding, and now acts as Technical Director.

He was appointed Member of the Order of the British Empire (MBE) in the 2010 New Year Honours for services to Business and to International Trade.

== Early career ==
After graduating in engineering from Trinity College, Cambridge, in 1968, Ritchie worked as a computer programmer for Elliott Automation which subsequently became part of Marconi. He then spent 5 years as a self-employed landscape gardener. In the mid-1970s his father, a stockbroker, introduced him to Bill Ingram and the Bickerton bike, which in turn triggered his own ideas for a folding bicycle. Ritchie persuaded 10 friends to invest £100 each so that he could build a prototype which was completed one year later.

'[the first prototype] was ride-able and it worked, but it is something I'm deeply ashamed of as a piece of engineering.'

— Andrew Ritchie, 2005,

Two more prototypes were built in the bedroom of his flat overlooking Brompton Oratory in South Kensington, London – hence the bike's name.

After failing to license the design to Raleigh Bicycle Company he managed to sell 30 bicycles to order for £250 each in advance. Convinced that there had to be at least another 20 people willing to buy one, he produced 50 rather than just the 30. After 18 months, the bikes were delivered – and all 50 were sold.

In the early 1980s, Ritchie raised £8,000 from shareholders, and made 500 bikes over 2 years.

It was jolly hard work, there was me and one employee, who was doing all the brazing. It was hopelessly inefficient, but it broke even. So I thought I ought to try to raise some venture capital and get the thing going properly. My timing couldn't have been worse. The bicycle business in Britain was in decline. I never came across as a natural entrepreneur, and they're pretty wary of the inventor setting himself up as an entrepreneur as well. So that came to nought.

— Andrew Ritchie, 2005,

== Bicycle manufacturer ==
Ritchie received private funding of £40,000 from Julian Vereker, founder of Naim Audio and a yacht manufacturer, who had originally bought two Bromptons after a chance discussion about 'folding bicycles' whilst on one of his yachts in Cherbourg in 1982. An additional £10,000 equity raised from friends, relatives and Brompton owners launched the company properly in 1986, and he eventually secured £100,000 to set up a better-equipped factory under a Brentford railway arch in 1987. It had taken five years to secure the capital.

Private backing allowed me to be a perfectionist. In a way, I'm glad we didn't get a licensing deal with Raleigh. I'm not sure that the business would have survived. The bike probably would have been dumbed down and cheapened.

— Andrew Ritchie, 2005,

Volume production was difficult and demand outstripped the factory's capacity, so it expanded into a second railway arch in 1994 and again in 1998 into the Chiswick premises it occupied until moving to Greenford in 2016.

I have worked bloody hard. I've remained single. I haven't had a family – this is my family in a sense. I went through years in the doldrums as a thoroughly unmarriable chap – no income at all and obsessed with his project. […] I'm craving more time – to travel, play tennis, garden, and just be. I hardly know my own house.

— Andrew Ritchie, 2005,

== Later life ==
Ritchie has recruited new management since the early 2000s, including Will Butler-Adams who became managing director and, with new investors, purchased half of Ritchie's 50% shareholding.

"It has paid dividends, I'm not a model businessman. My strength is my eye for detail and an obsession with getting things right but I'm weak in other areas. I would have been happy with the 10%-a-year growth we were seeing but Will recognised that there was a much bigger market not being satisfied."'

— Andrew Ritchie, 2008,

Ritchie acknowledges that Brompton has been his life.
