= David T. Hon =

Taiwanese physicist, inventor and entrepreneur (born 1941)

David T. Hon (born 1941) is a Guangdong-born Taiwanese physicist, inventor and entrepreneur. He is best known as the inventor and founder of Dahon folding bicycles. Dahon has since grown to become the world's largest manufacturer and marketer of folding bikes with Hon still CEO to this day.

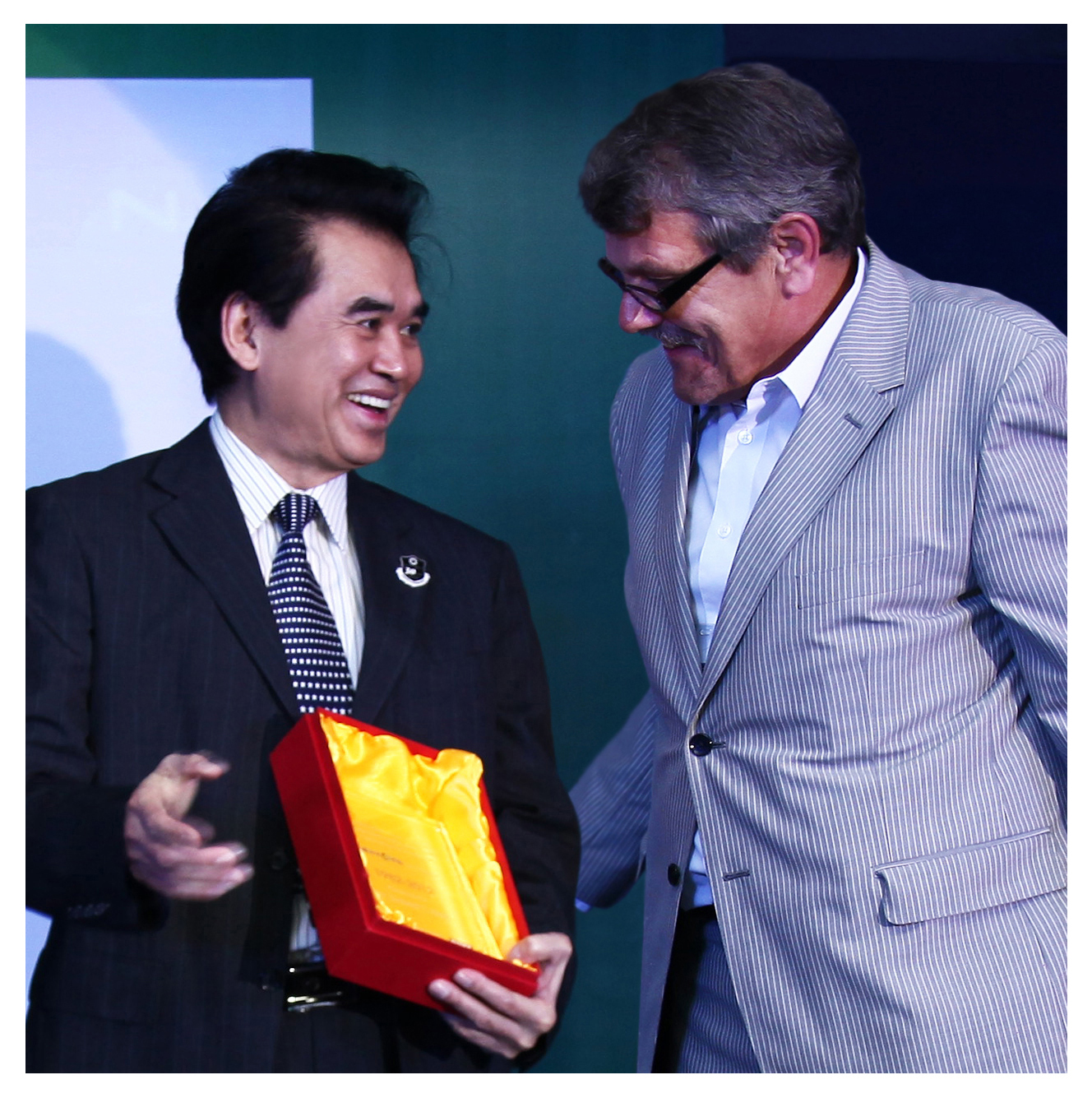
Dr. David T. Hon, founder and CEO of Dahon, receives and award from Jack Oortwijn, editor in chief of Bike Europe

== Early life ==
Born 1941, Hon hails from a poor family from Hong Kong. From the age of 13 through to 18 he worked part-time as an illustrator for his parents' clothing workshop. He received a scholarship to attend, and graduated from, the prestigious Anglican-run Diocesan Boys' School in 1959 and the family moved to the U.S. soon afterwards.

Hon graduated from UC, Berkeley in 1964, with a BA in physics and at UCLA's physics department, obtained the highest score in the Ph.D. candidacy exam in 1967. Whilst still a doctoral candidate he taught as assistant professor of physics at Cal Poly State U in San Luis Obispo, and, later, as Sr. Lecturer at USC. He went on to complete his thesis as an NSF and NASA scholar at USC where he received his Ph.D. in physics in 1971.

== Career ==
Hon's career in physics truly started when he took up employment at Hughes Aircraft Company, Los Angeles, one of the world's leading aerospace corporations. His work focused in particular on the research and development of tactical lasers. In his early years he became known for his work on high power laser frequency doubling, quickly becoming section head and senior physicist. He became a coauthor in the internationally used Laser Handbook (North Holland Press, 1979).

In 1977 Hon was drafted into the highly regarded Hughes Research Labs in Malibu. With greater freedom in research choices, this facility is where he began to focus on the pursuit of lasers for nuclear fusion. By 1980 he had discovered and published a novel technique to efficiently compress high-power laser pulses (to attain over ten times the peak powers) by using Stimulated Brillouin Scattering (SBS) from a tapered optical fiber. This work has since inspired hundreds of related research projects right up to the present day. The technique is now widespread in laser nuclear fusion, and ground or space-born defense lasers, as well as in other areas of science and engineering where high, peak-power or high quality laser beams are desired. Hon's work at Hughes brought about some of the first of his many patents: e.g. US Patents 4,344,042, 4,178,561, 4,019,159 and 4,010,397.

== Inventor and entrepreneur ==
The oil crisis of the 1970s coincided with a gradual realization for Hon that for many technical reasons, laser nuclear fusion as the ultimate clean energy solution might never be achieved in his lifetime. For some years already he had been researching the idea of a truly effective folding bicycle. So in 1981 he parted ways with Hughes Research Labs and became a self-employed entrepreneur for practicable green solutions.

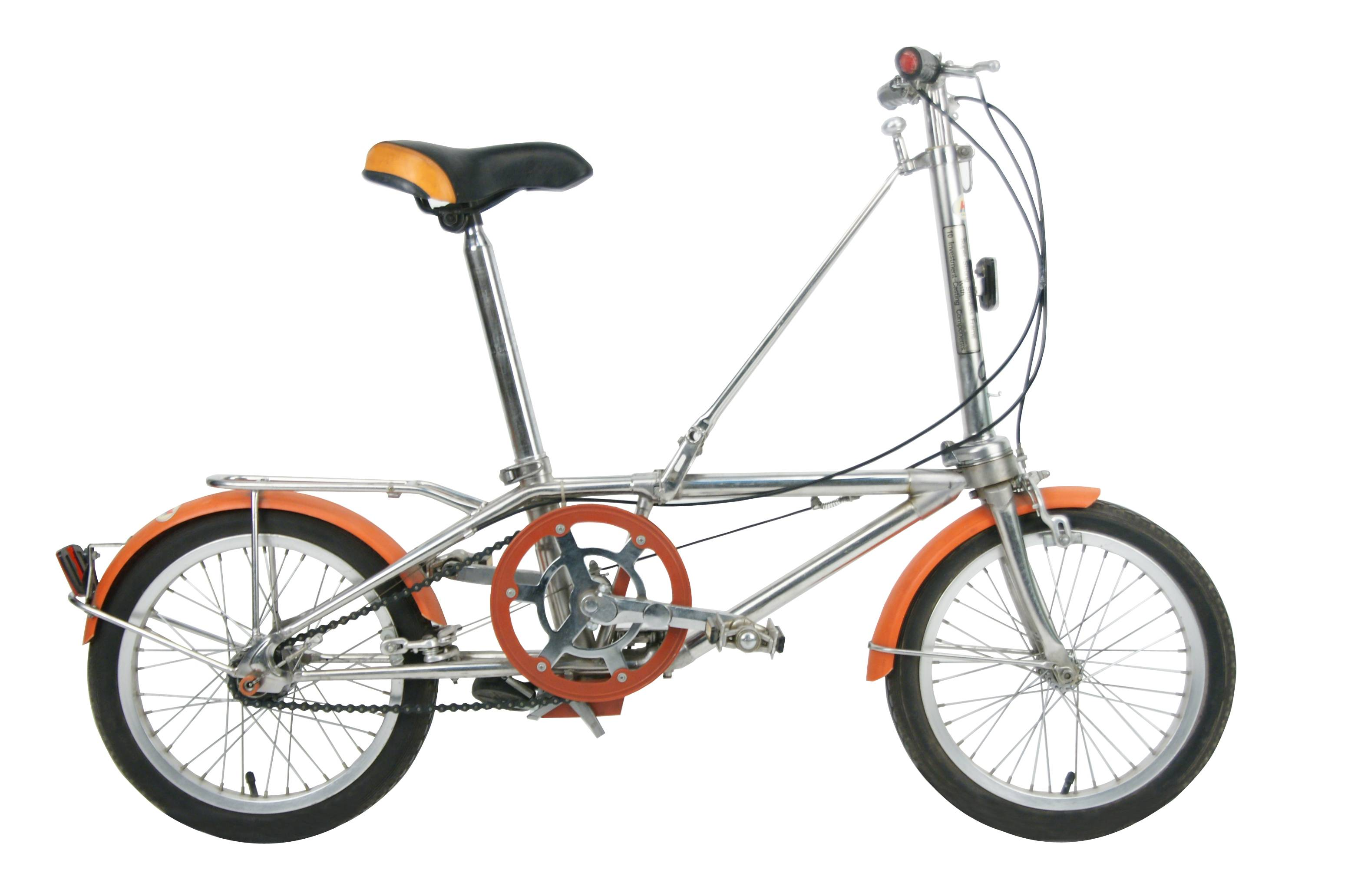
Original 1982 Hon Convertible

Hon's folding bicycle was the result of some seven years of garage research and invention. When he was satisfied with the end product, he at first steered towards licensing his folding bike to existing big brands. They however, failed to share in his enthusiasm. With faith undimmed, Hon and his brother Henry raised US$2 million from 35 investors through extensive media exposure and founded Dahon North America in 1982 (originally Hon California, Inc).

Soon after founding the company, Hon decided that to make it more cost effective he would open a factory in Taiwan. He practically moved to the emerging bicycle industry hot-spot to look after operations, while Henry Hon stayed looking after marketing in the U.S. The business took off, in 1985 alone selling over 10,000 bicycles and by 1994 more than 100,000 annually with 60% of the market share. Dahon continued to grow in popularity worldwide among commuters, vacationers and cyclists.

== Present day ==
Hon has won many international awards and has registered 220+ patents related to foldable bikes, many in Asia where most bikes are produced. A few of these innovations/inventions have become standard features in nearly all folding bikes today. Hon's inventions have been widely copied, both legally and illegally and he has become quite involved in IP protection advocacy. He is currently chairman of the Industrial Intellectual Property Committee of the Shenzhen Federation of Industrial Economics, has assisted in pushing through legislation that protects foreign companies operating in China and has been published on the subject in China's largest economic journal.

In 1995 Dahon opened its ISO 9001 certified factory in Shenzhen, China. The company has since grown to officially become the world's largest producer of folding bikes, turning out about half a million units a year with over 5 million bikes sold to date, mostly under its own brands. Dahon today operates seven factories or subsidiaries in three continents. Hon remains CEO while still contributing inventions and designs.

In 2013, Dr. David Hon was furthermore nominated for UC Berkeley Excellence in Achievement Award for his "contributions in high-powered lasers as well as his role in revolutionizing the modern-day folding bicycle."

In the last decades we have seen first-hand the varied ways that portable bikes can contribute to a greener and better way of life ... City governments and transport authorities have eased regulations and opened new opportunities for commuters to use bikes as an intermodal means of personal mobility. These are very promising first steps into an even more widespread rethinking of transportation in the next few years.

— Dr. David T. Hon, 2009,

== Memberships and organizations ==
- Governor of American Chamber of Commerce of South China
- Board Member of Light Electric Vehicle Association (LEVA)
- Associate Member of A-Team, Taiwan
- Board Member of China Bicycle Association
- Vice Chairman of Guangdong Bicycle Association
- Chairman of the Industrial Intellectual Property Committee of the Shenzhen Federation of Industrial Economics
- Committee Member of the H.M. George She Scholarship Fund

== Personal life ==
Hon is married to Florence Shen, has sons Joshua and Reuel (an associate director at MGM who has since died) and grand children. He has four younger brothers Peter, Richard, Paul (a Christian missionary), and Henry.

Hon is interested in the arts and anthropology. He is good at painting, musical instruments like piano, and ballroom dancing. Hon plays basketball and ping-pong regularly, and is fluent in English, Mandarin and Cantonese.

== Bibliography ==
- Guinness World Records 2000 Millennium Edition. New York: Guinness Publishing Ltd./Bantam Books. 2000. ISBN 0-553-58268-2.
