= Brompton Bicycle =

British bicycle manufacturer

Coordinates: 51.4907°N 0.2931°W

Brompton Bicycle Limited

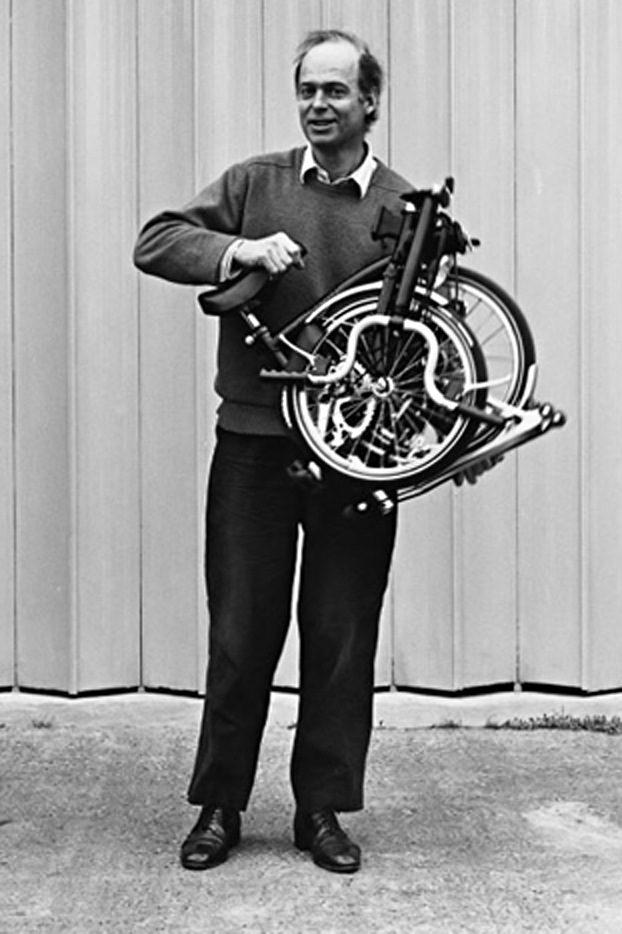
- Founder Andrew Ritchie with a folded Brompton bicycle
- Industry: Manufacturing
- Founded: June 3, 1976; 50 years ago
- Headquarters: Greenford, Greater London, England, UK
- Key people: Andrew Ritchie (Founder); Will Butler-Adams (CEO)
- Products: Folding bicycle
- Revenue: £42 million+ (2019)
- Operating income: £3.4 million+
- Owner: Decathlon (10%); BA Capital (5%)
- Number of employees: 315
- Website: brompton.com

Brompton Bicycle Limited, trading as Brompton, is a British manufacturer of folding bicycles based in Greenford, London.

The Brompton folding bicycle and accessories are the company's core product, noted for its self-supporting compact size when stored. All available models of the folding bicycle are based on the same hinged frame and ETRTO 35-349 mm (16-inch) tyre size. Components are added, removed, or replaced by titanium parts to form the many variations. The modular design has remained fundamentally unchanged since the original patent was filed by Andrew Ritchie in 1979, with small details being refined by continual improvement. Ritchie was awarded the 2009 Prince Philip Designers Prize for work on the bicycle.

Brompton is the largest volume bicycle manufacturer in Britain, producing approximately 50,000 bicycles each year. The company's bicycles are also available for hire.

== Design ==
Four stages in folding. The final step of lowering the saddle locks the package together

All Brompton folding bicycle models share the same curved frame, consisting of a hinged main tube, pivoting rear triangle, fork, and hinged handle-bar stem. The main tube and stem are made of steel in most models. The rear triangle and fork are either steel or titanium, depending on model. The T line introduced in 2022 has an all-titanium frame and other lightweight components. Steel sections are joined by brazing rather than welding. Wheel rim size is 349 mm (13.7 in), carrying tyres with 16″ tread diameter. The handlebars and some peripheral components are aluminium.

A Brompton bicycle uses over 1,200 individual pieces, many of which are specific to Brompton. In comparison, a simple single-speed bicycle may have around 300 parts, while a more complex road bicycle may have over 1,000 parts.

As of 2025 the combinations allow four or twelve speed gearing options for the C, P and T line bicycles, the A line uses older parts and is only a 3 speed, new in late 2024 was the G line with 20" wheels and 8 speed Shimano Alfine hub gearing, the electric G line version is 4spd only due to the rear hub motor.

The Brompton uses a combined rear fold and suspension design. During riding, the main frame and the rear triangle intersect at a rubber block which provides suspension. The suspension block is kept in compression by the rider's weight. There is no suspension for the front wheel, although the titanium forks of the Superlight versions provide a small amount of spring.

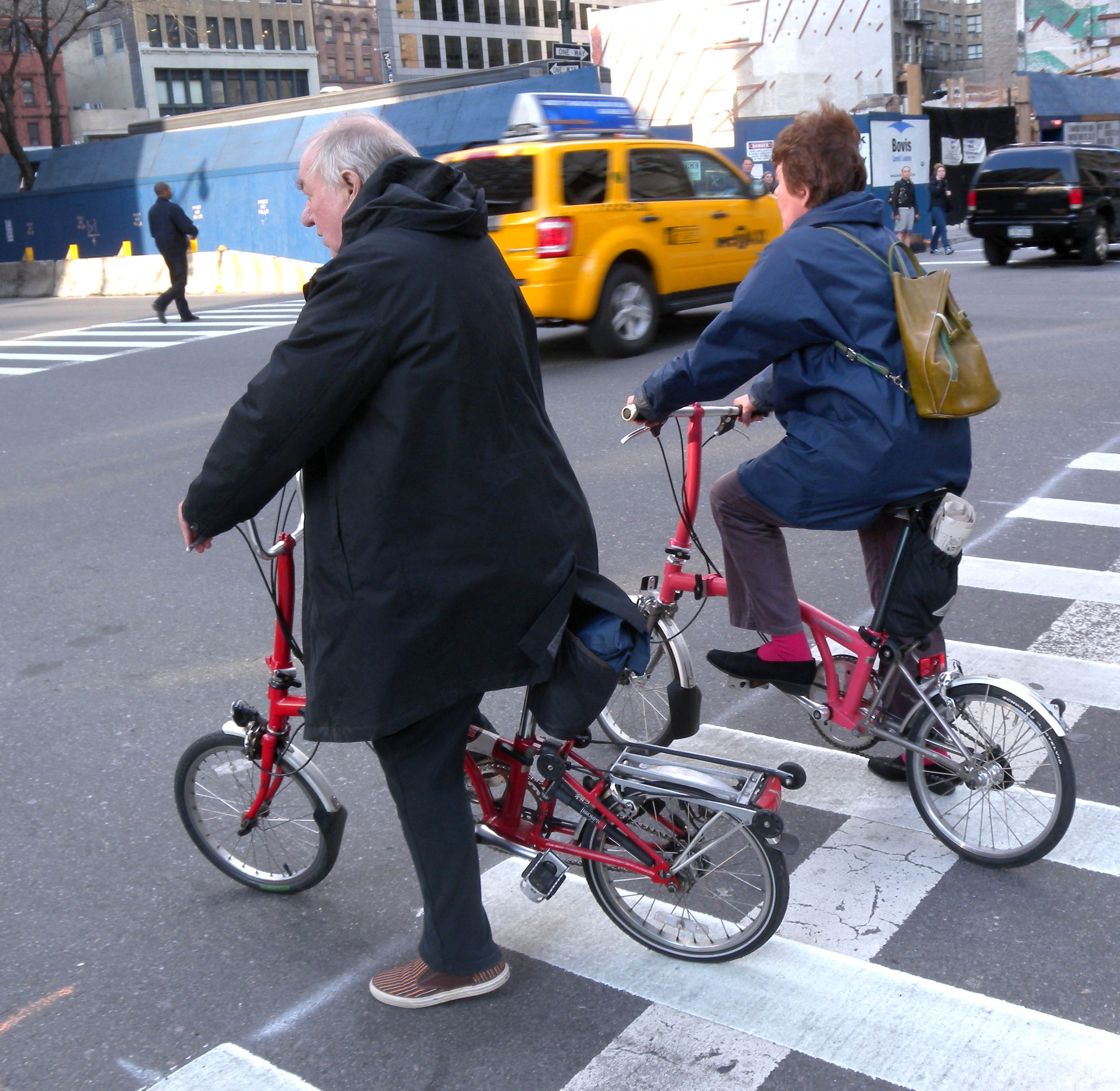
Classic M handlebar and rear rack (front), and S handlebar and no rack (rear)

== Company ==
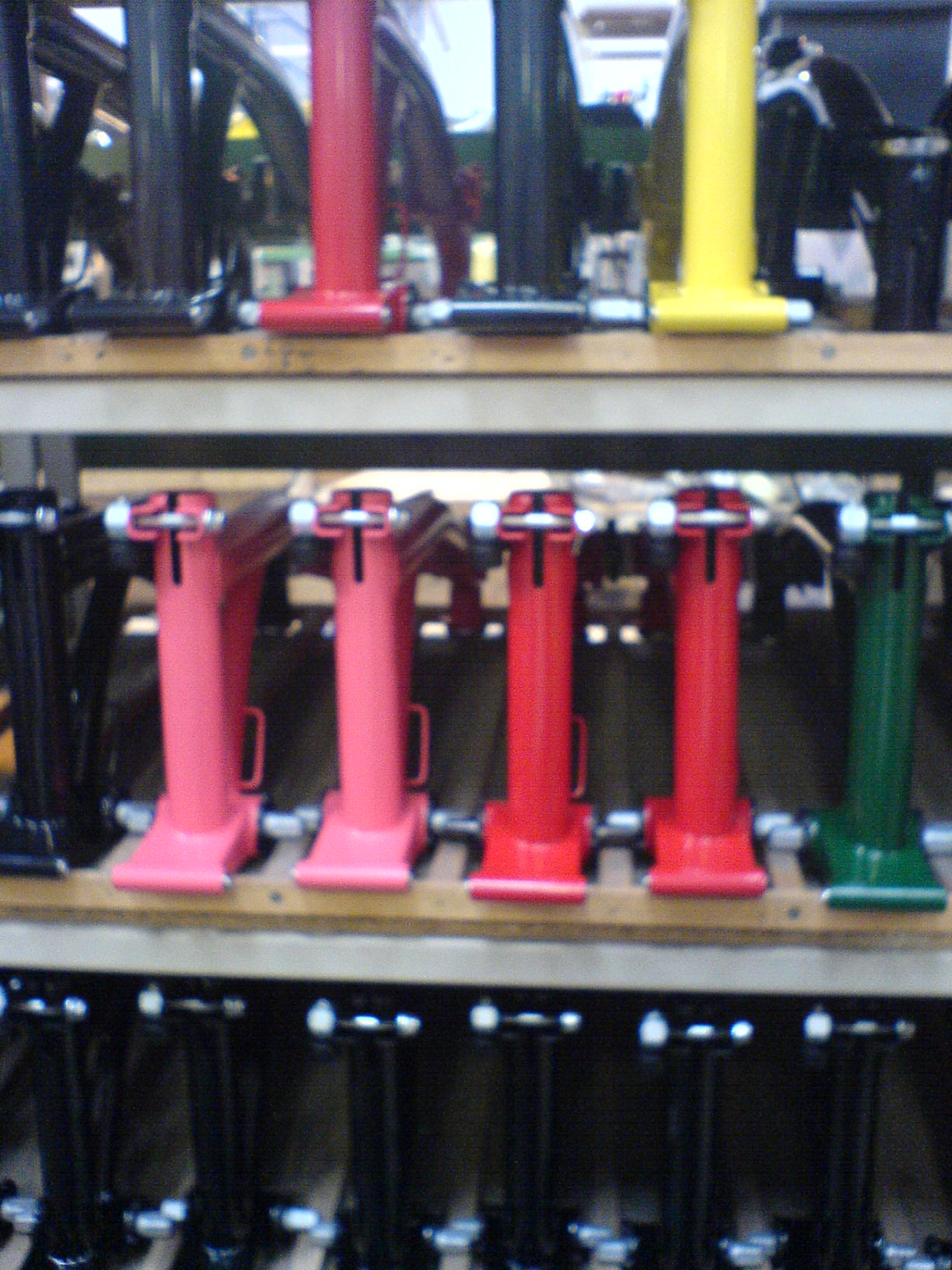
Brompton frame parts at the factory in Kew

In 1976 Andrew Ritchie founded the company, named after the Brompton Oratory, a landmark visible from his bedroom workshop where the first prototypes were built. At the time he was working as a gardener. Ritchie obtained backing from friends and sought to license the design, but after five years began manufacturing the bicycle design himself. Production ground to a halt in 1982 after which Ritchie continued to explore possibilities for continued manufacturing whilst undertaking other jobs.

Finally in 1986, again with backing from friends and former customers, enough was raised to resume production on a larger scale. With a bank loan underwritten by Julian Vereker (founder of Naim Audio), production was restarted in a railway arch in Brentford. By early 1988, mass-production Brompton bicycles were once again in circulation.

From 2002, when Will Butler-Adams joined the firm (he became managing director in 2008), to 2013, production increased from 6,000 to approximately 40,000 bikes per year. The workforce increased from 24 to 190.

In March 2009, Brompton Bicycle achieved a record monthly turnover of just under £1 million; the employees were rewarded with fish and chips. In the same month, the company stated that it was hoping to continue a 25% rate of growth; partially enabled by switching to just-in-time stocking for some of the parts being sourced from suppliers, and by having those suppliers hold the stock until it is needed rather than parts living for periods at the Brompton factory.

The company was awarded The Queen's Award for Export in 1995.

In the Queen's Birthday Honours of 21 April 2010, the company was awarded two Queen's Awards for Enterprise, in the Innovation and International Trade categories. This was the second time Brompton had won the International Trade Award, they first received it in 1995. It is very rare for a company to receive two of these awards in one year.

Will Butler-Adams, managing director, was awarded Order of the British Empire in 2015. In July 2015 a plan to move the company from Brentford to nearby Greenford was reported. In February 2022 another move, from Greenford to Ashford, Kent was announced.

In June 2026, Brompton Bicycle sold a 15% stake of the company (collectively worth £18 million) to French sports retailer Decathlon (10%) and Chinese investment group BA Capital (5%). The deal will enable the company to realise cash from the sale of the shares and also to enter growth markets such as Germany and China.

=== Clones and licensing ===
A Dahon folding bike

In 1992, Brompton agreed with Euro-Tai in Taiwan to allow the manufacture of a licensed copy of the Brompton bicycle for distribution in Eastern Asia. A joint venture company called Neobike was then established to manufacture them. Brompton Bicycle in the United Kingdom would loan tools and drawings, and be paid on a per-unit royalty basis.

By mid-1992, Neobike had recruited three senior research and development employees from Dahon, another folding bicycle company, and had started to produce other designs and copies in addition to the official Brompton design. Brompton's licensing contract with Euro-Tai/Neobike lasted approximately ten years until it expired on 31 December 2002. By this time, five senior Neobike employees had been convicted and jailed for stealing trade secrets from Dahon and Ritchie had previously stated that the franchise contract had been "under review", there having been quality issues with the Asian-built Brompton bicycles. Euro-Tai and Neobike failed to return the Brompton-specific tooling loaned by Brompton Bicycle. One week later after the expiration of the official licensing agreement Euro-Tai sold its controlling stake in Neobike to YTE Manufacturing, an aluminium supplier that was already involved with producing frames for Neobike.

At the 2003 Eurobike trade show, Neobike exhibited their—now unsanctioned—clone of the Brompton, offering it to potential dealers within Europe. Neobike-produced copies of the Brompton bicycle were then imported into The Netherlands branded as the "Scoop One" and "Astra Flex V3". Later, Neobike's interests in its copy-bicycle business were transferred to an entity called Grace Gallant Enterprises, for sale under the brand "Flamingo". Between 2004 and 2010, several batches of copies were imported into the European market: into the United Kingdom under the name "Merc", into Belgium, and into Spain as the "Nishiki Oxford". Taiwanese-manufactured clones bear the model numbers FL-BP01-3/FL-BP01-7 standing for Flamingo, "Best Persuader", 3-speed/7-speed. As of 2014, Grace-Galant continue to make clones for the East Asia market under the Flamingo and MIT brand names. Later iterations of the clones had their frames made of aluminium, rather than the steel frame of the originals.

==== Court cases ====
Following the expiry of the Brompton patent, Brompton Bicycle's legal actions against Neobike/Grace Gallant have all been brought on the basis of copyright- and industrial design-law.

A court case was held at the Groningen civil court in the Netherlands on 24 May 2006, which ruled that the industrial design of the Brompton folding bicycle was protected by copyright. Additionally, the Neobike-provided manual had included direct copies of those drawings found in the Brompton user manual. The Brompton Bicycle Limited v Rijwielbedrijf Vincent Van Ellen BV ruling held that there was creative flexibility in the design for a bicycle beyond those choices made purely for functional reasons; in the Brompton case this included the M-style handlebars, curved main frame tube and the cable-placement. Each of these were noted to be distinctive design decisions that another manufacturer could change without compromising the ability to create a functional folding bicycle. Such a level of perceived similarity was therefore likely to cause "confusion in the market" under the Dutch copyright law, Article 13. Neobike did not choose to appeal and Brompton Bicycle was granted the right to have all of the imported bicycles destroyed with an injunction against future imports by Neobike's distributors.

In June 2010, Brompton Bicycle gained a further injunction against the import of the unlicensed copy Brompton models into Spain, this time under the name "Nishiki Oxford Bicycle". The case was decided on the basis that Grace Gallant predecessors' had not returned all of Brompton Bicycle Ltd's drawings and tooling upon the termination of the earlier Eurotai/Neobike franchise agreement.

== Reception ==
Many reviews of Brompton folding bicycles are favourable.

== See also ==
- Comparison of hub gears
- Brompton World Championship, annual rider competition using Brompton bicycles.
- List of bicycle brands and manufacturing companies
