= Dahon =

American bicycle manufacturer

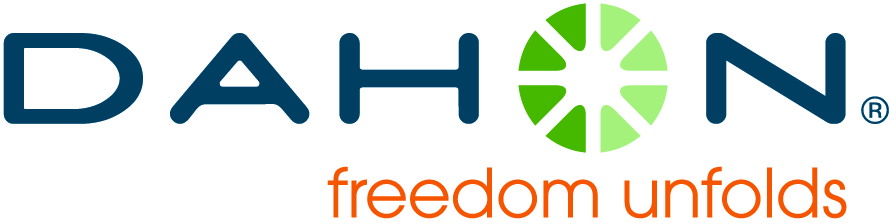
- Industry: Bicycle
- Founded: 1982; 44 years ago
- Area served: the America, Europe, Asia, Oceania, Middle East
- Key people: David T. Hon (founder and CEO)
- Products: Folding bicycles, electric-assist folding bicycles, road bikes, gravel-style folding bikes, accessories, and components
- Website: www.dahon.com

Dahon is the world's largest manufacturer of folding bicycles with a two-thirds marketshare in 2006. The company was founded in 1982 by David T. Hon, a former laser physicist, in California, United States. Currently, the company has offices in the US, Europe, and China . DAHON Tech, a subsidiary of DAHON, was listed on the Hong Kong Stock Exchange in September 2025. Dahon Tech's initial public offering, trading under the stock code 02543.HK, was more than 7,550 times oversubscribed.

Dahon markets bicycles under its own name as well as other brand names, including BICECO. The company is a member of the Global Alliance for EcoMobility. Dahon holds over 600 patents, some having become industry standards.

== Company ==
=== History ===
Dahon was founded in 1982 as Hon California, Inc.. After presenting his invention to several established but uninterested companies, Hon and his brother Henry Hon decided to establish their own company from scratch. The two gathered venture funding and established their headquarters in Southern California while Hon relocated to Taiwan to build Dahon's first factory. Two years later, in 1984, Dahon folding bicycles were rolling off the assembly line as one of the most compact folding bicycle on the market at that time (many will argue the Brompton Bicycle is a more compact folder).

=== Production ===
Primary production takes place in the company's factory in Shenzhen, China. Another facility, near Beijing, produces Dahon bikes for China, an increasingly profitable market for the U.S.-based company. Beginning in 2012, all Dahon brand bikes destined for Europe have been made in Bulgaria. In a strategic partnership with Maxcom Ltd., the company set up a production base at one of the facilities on the continent. All of their bikes for the European market are made at the facility in Plovdiv.

In 2025, DAHON formed an alliance with Golden Wheel Group to establish the new company Dagold Technology. A new factory was established in Tianjin, China, to support the production of e-bikes and other products in electric mobility.

=== Marketing ===
In 2012, Dahon launched its first global advertising campaign, incorporating a two-tiered marketing campaign specifically designed for both b2b and b2c markets. Dahon introduced the new tagline, "freedom unfolds". The new global campaign, themed "Express Your Personality" was launched at Eurobike 2011 in Friedrichshafen, Germany in a live-stage performance. In 2019, DAHON introduced the DAHON 360°Program, under which the company licensed its brand and proprietary technologies to other companies in the bicycle industry. In the 2020s, DAHON expanded its marketing focus beyond folding bicycles to include electric bicycles and broader mobility products. The company has promoted its patented technologies, including DELTECH, Super Downtube and the DAHON-V Tech Suite.

== Folding bikes ==
Most Dahon bicycles use a patented, single-hinge frame design where the handlebar folds down and the frame hinge swings to the left, leaving the handlebar inside, whereas models such as the Jifo and EEZZ take advantage of new, vertical folding technology. The biggest sellers are those with ETRTO 305 mm and 406 mm (16 or 20 inch) wheels, but models are available with wheels from 239 mm to 622 mm (12 inches to 700C). In terms of gearing, bikes can feature derailleurs or hub gears, or both or none.

For 2013 Dahon offers 30 models of folding or portable bicycles in wheel sizes ranging from 305 mm to 559 mm (16-26") with aluminum alloy or steel frames. One of the company's best selling bikes is the Boardwalk, an entry-level, steel-frame commuter bike.

2025 – DAHON unveiled the K-Feather, a 12 kg electric folding bicycle designed for urban mobility. The model incorporated a torque-sensing pedal-assist system and an integrated battery with a claimed range of up to 40 km.

In 2026, DAHON introduced the Mariner HD and Mariner XL, two folding bicycles designed to accommodate a wider range of riders. The Mariner HD features a reinforced frame with a payload capacity of up to 150 kg (330 lb), while the Mariner XL incorporates 22-inch wheels. The Mariner HD received a Taipei Cycle d&i Award in 2026. Meanwhile, DAHON introduced the LUNDEN GR, a 20-inch tri-fold bicycle and the first model to incorporate DAHON-V technology into a tri-fold design. Developed for urban, mixed-terrain and light gravel riding, the bicycle featured a Shimano 8-speed internal hub, adjustable D2D stem, dynamic suspension system and 20 × 2.0-inch tires. It was publicly debuted at Eurobike 2026.

=== Special bikes ===
In 2008, to celebrate 25 years of production, Dahon produced a special edition based on the Mμ series of bikes - the Mμ XXV. 250 of these machines were produced. In March 2009, they announced that they would produce 1,000 sets of a special edition bike based on its Curve D3 folding bike with the Spanish design firm Kukuxumusu. 2012 marked the company's 30th anniversary, and Dahon produced 300 limited edition bikes to honor the occasion. The bicycles are based on the popular Mμ frame and feature high-end carbon parts.

In March 2017, released a new model called the Curl, in celebration of the company's 35th anniversary. They decided to bring end users into the process by launching a Kickstarter campaign to fund production of the bike. The Kickstarter campaign allowed for more involvement in the production process by manufacturers, dealers, distributors, and riders.

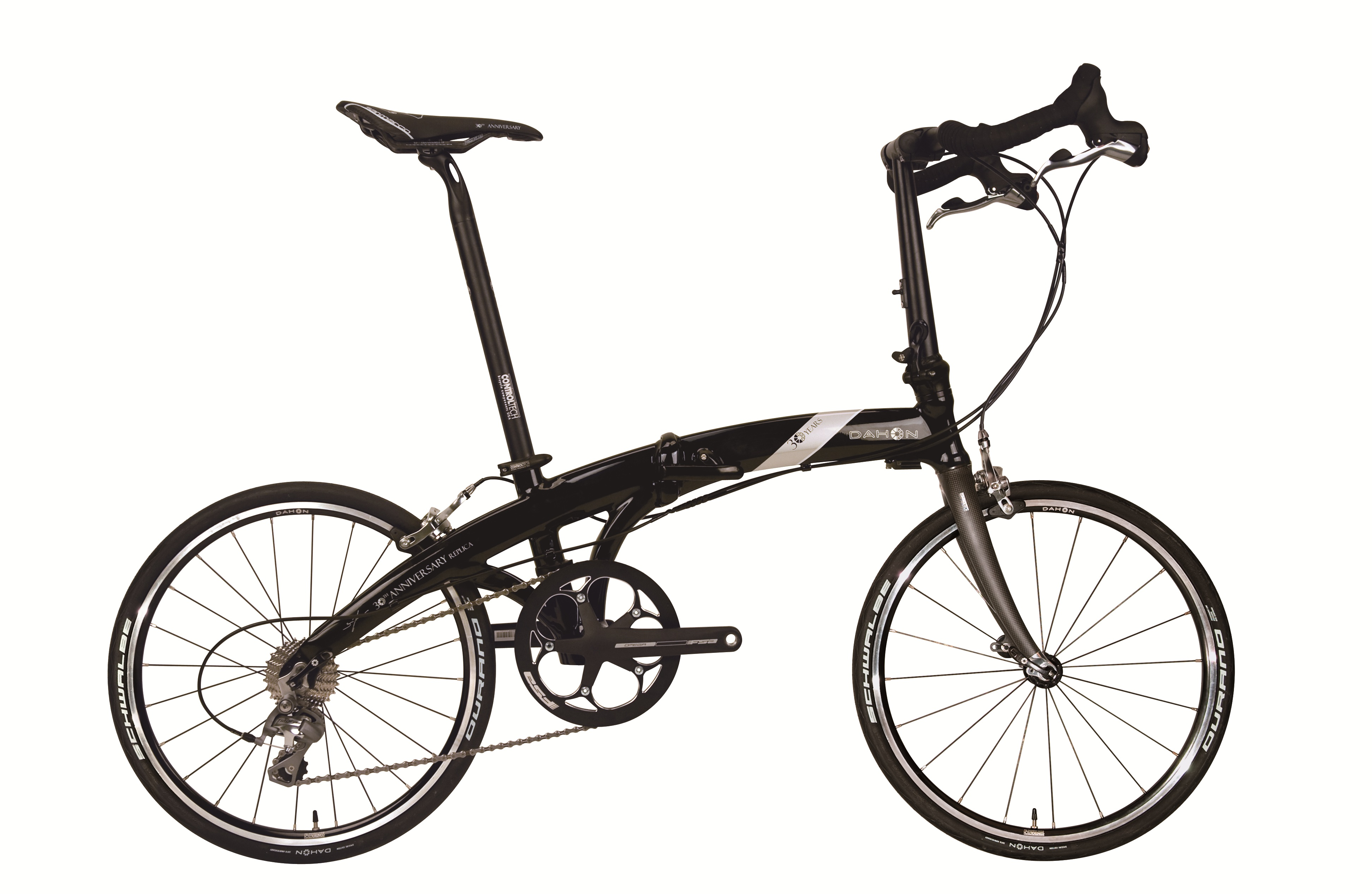
2012 Dahon Special Edition, 30th Anniversary, aluminum frame, folding bike with carbon parts

In June 2017, DAHON marked its 35th anniversary and announced the release of a special anniversary bike based on the Curl - the Curl i8. The bike was limited to a run of 500 that were available world wide with riders having to sign up to pre-order the bike. Those that preordered the bike had the opportunity to have their signature etched onto the bike frame.

In 2022, DAHON marked its 40th anniversary and released a dual-beam carbon-fiber folding bicycle. Limited to 249 units worldwide, the model featured a full carbon-fiber frame and fork, hydraulic disc brakes, Shimano 11-speed components, and DAHON's patented Lock Jaw hinge system. The bicycle weighed approximately 9.4 kg (20.7 lb).

In 2024, DAHON introduced its first 700C road bicycle features the DAHON-V tech at the Taipei Cycle Show. The aluminum-framed model was designed to improve frame stiffness and pedaling efficiency, marking DAHON's expansion into the performance road bicycle segment beyond its traditional folding bicycle lineup.

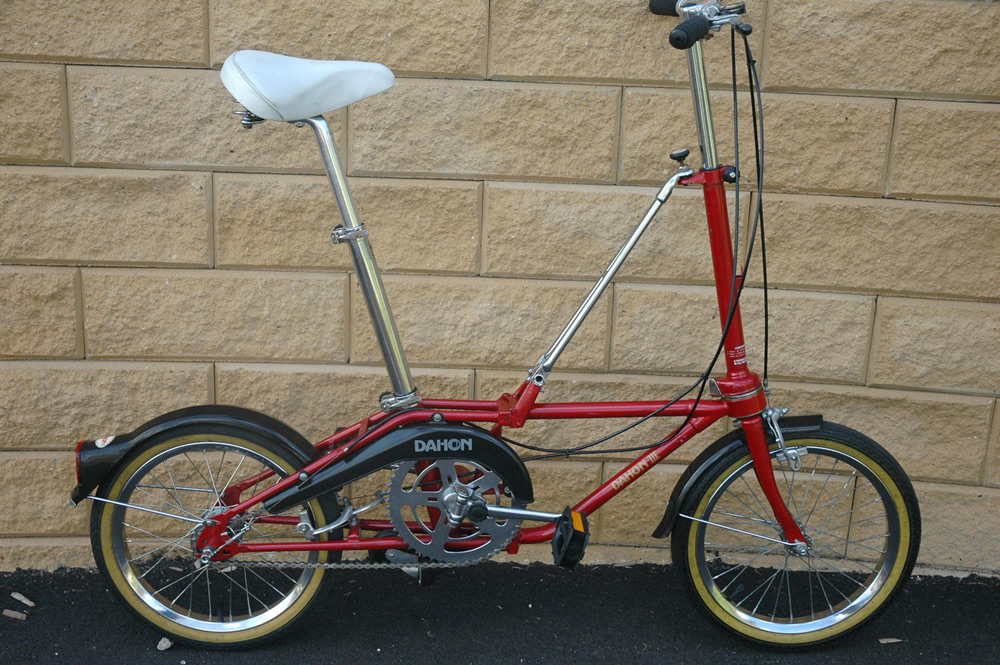
1980s (first generation) Dahon Classic III with Sturmey-Archer 3 speed hub gear

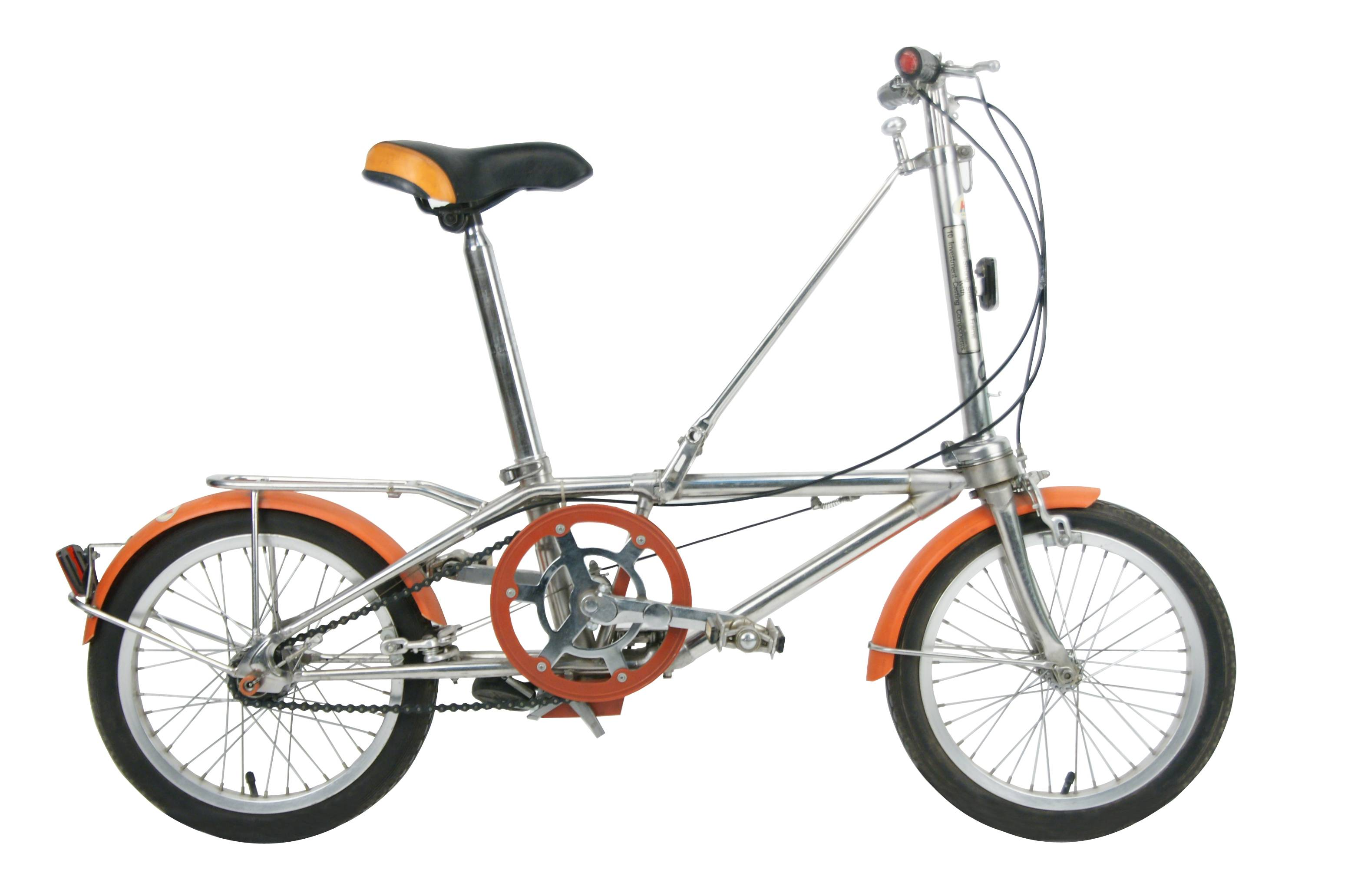
Original 1982 model in stainless steel.

=== Awards and recognition ===
Dahon has achieved various industry awards and recognition over the years, including the Eurobike award, given at the world's largest bike show.

| Model / Item | Year | Award / Recognition |
|---|---|---|
| Mariner HD | 2026 | Taipei Cycle Design & Innovation Award |
| K-Feather | 2024 | The Gold Award of "2024 CHINA CYCLE Creative Award" |
| Mariner D8 | 2023 | "Best Folding Bike" by The New York Times |
| DAHON | 2021 | China National High-Tech Enterprise |
| Clinch D18 | 2015 | Taipei Cycle Design & Innovation Award |
| 4D Quickpark Stem | 2015 | Taipei Cycle Design & Innovation Award |
| EEZZ | 2012 | Eurobike Award |
| EEZZ (Prototype name Metro) | 2012 | Taipei Cycle Design & Innovation Award |
| Glide P7/P8 | 2006 | Eurobike Award |
| Ciao! | 2006 | Fiets RAI Bike of the Year |
| Ciao! | 2005 | Eurobike Award |
| Flo | 2004 | Fortune Product of the Year |
| DAHON | 2000 | "World's largest producer of folding bicycles", Guinness World Record |

== Controversy ==
Beginning in 2011, Dahon North America Inc. was in litigation with the son and wife of the company's founder. Specifically, the lawsuit charged that Joshua Hon and Florence Hon breached their fiduciary duties as officers of Dahon and unlawfully appropriated company assets, resources, and intellectual property to start the competing companies Mobility Holdings and Tern. As of March 2013, a settlement was reached on mutually acceptable and confidential terms and the matter is closed.

== Events ==
=== Smithfield Nocturne Folding Bike Race ===
The 2008, 2009, 2010, and 2012 winners of the Smithfield Nocturne folding bike race, held in the market district of Smithfield, London, rode Dahon folding bikes. The 2012 winner, Jeroen Janssen, pedaled to victory on the 30th Anniversary limited edition bike. Dahon also sponsored the annual event from 2007 to 2010.

== Bibliography ==
- Guinness World Records 2000 Millennium Edition. New York: Guinness Publishing Ltd./Bantam Books. 2000. ISBN 0-553-58268-2.
