= GP Mazda Schelkens =

Belgian one-day road cycling race

Race details
- Date: Late May
- Region: Borsbeek, Belgium
- Discipline: Road
- Web site: stanockersclassic.be

History
- First edition: 2022
- Editions: 5 (as of 2026)
- First winner: Danique Braam (NED)
- Most recent: Charlotte Kool (NED)

The GP Mazda Schelkens is an elite women's professional one-day road bicycle race held annually in Borsbeek, Belgium. The event was first held in 2022. It is currently rated by the UCI as a 1.1 category race, upgrading from 1.2 status in 2024.

== Past winners ==
Year	Country	Rider	Team
2022	Netherlands	Danique Braam	Bingoal Casino–Chevalmeire–Van Eyck Sport
2023	Belgium	Dina Scavone	Carbonbike Giordana by Gen Z
2024	Italy	Martina Fidanza	Ceratizit–WNT Pro Cycling
2025	France	Clara Copponi	Lidl–Trek
2026	Netherlands	Charlotte Kool	Fenix–Premier Tech
