= Awa Bamogo =

Burkinabè cyclist (born 1999)

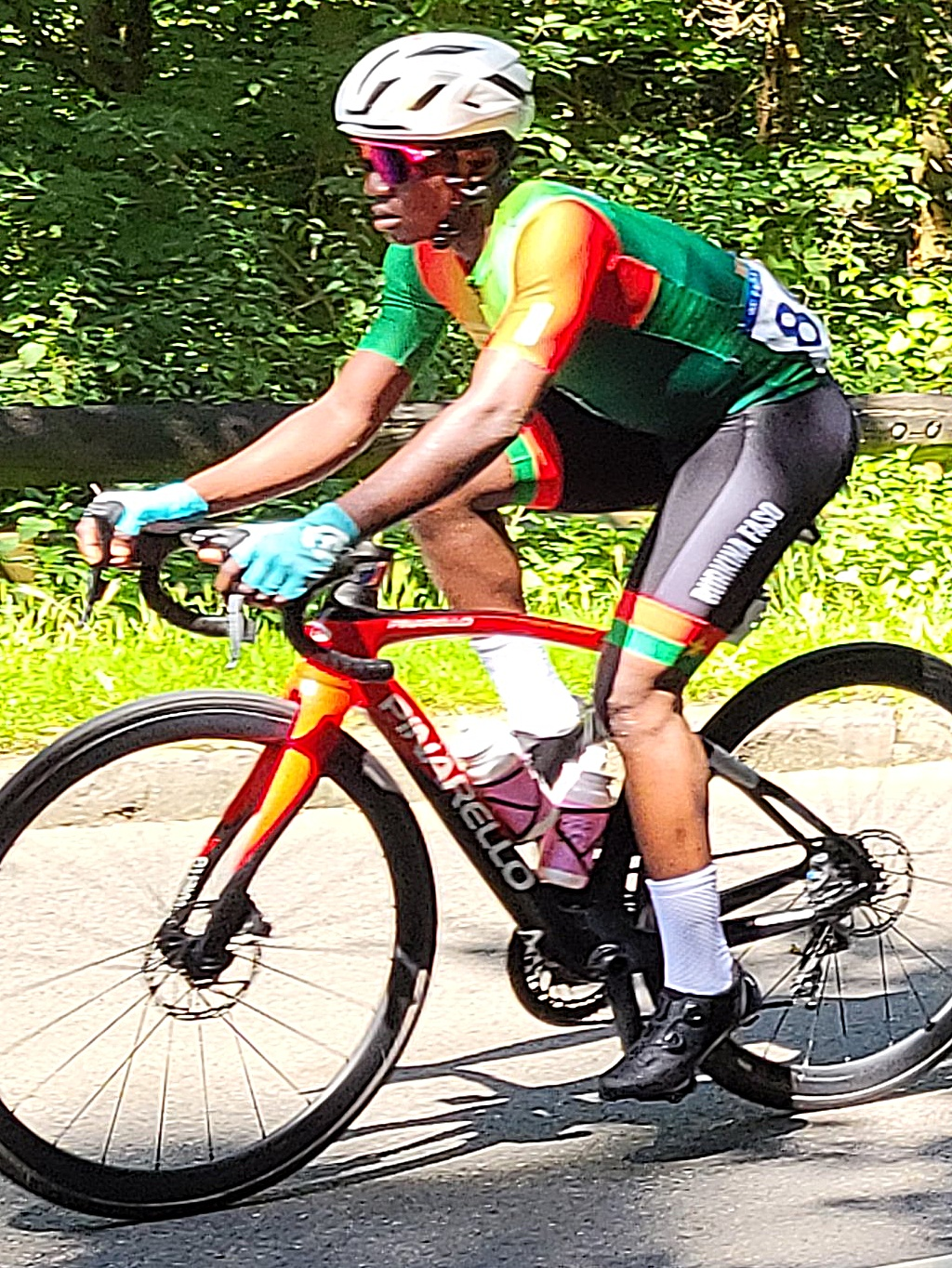
- Bamogo at the 2024 Summer Olympics

Personal information
- Born: 15 June 1999 (age 27) Ouahigouya
- Height: 1.70 m (5 ft 7 in)
- Weight: 58 kg (128 lb)

Cycling career
- Sport: Cycling
- Current team: Torelli
- Disciplines: Road; Track
- Role: Rider

Amateur team
- 2023: Horizons Africa Women's Cycling

Professional team
- 2024–: Torelli
Medal record
Women's road racing
Representing Burkina Faso
African Championships
Silver medal – second place	2023 Accra	Road race
Bronze medal – third place	2022 Sharm El Sheikh	Road race
Bronze medal – third place	2023 Accra	Mixed relay

Awa Bamogo (born 15 June 1999) is a Burkinabè road and track cyclist who currently competes for UCI Continental team Torelli.

== Career ==
Bamogo began her cycling career with support from Burkina Faso's armed forces sports union from 2018. She soon began to find success at the national an international levels, winning the Burkina Faso national road race in 2019 and 2021 and winning medals in road and track cycling in African championships, including a 3rd place in 2022 and a 2nd in 2023 at the African Road Championships. Also in 2023, she competed in European races for the first time with assistance from the British-based Horizon's Africa Women's Cycling team. Bamogo also participated in the 2023 African Games.

In 2024, Bamogo signed with UCI Continental team Torelli. Bamogo was selected to represent Burkina Faso in the road race at the 2024 Summer Olympics as the country's only cyclist at the games. She did not finish the race.

== Major results ==
2019
1st Road race, National Road championships
10th Time trial, African Games
2021
1st Road race, National Road championships
8th Time trial, African Championships
2022
African Championships

3rd Road race
10th Time trial

2023
African Championships

2nd Road race
3rd Mixed relay
4th Time trial

2nd Road race, National Road championships
2024
African Games

4th Criterium
6th Road race
6th Time trial

2025
1st Road race, National Road championships
2026

2nd Grand Prix de la RTB, 2e édition
Championne de la 1re édition du Tour cycliste féminin Yennenga
