= RideLondon Classique =

British women's cycling race

Race details
- Date: May
- Region: Essex and London
- Discipline: Road
- Competition: UCI Women's World Tour
- Type: Stage race
- Organiser: London Marathon Events
- Race director: Scott Sunderland
- Web site: www.ridelondon.co.uk/the-classique

History
- First edition: 2013
- Editions: 9 (as of 2024)
- Final edition: 2024
- First winner: Laura Trott (GBR)
- Most wins: Lorena Wiebes (NED) (3)
- Final winner: Lorena Wiebes (NED)

RideLondon Classique was a women's cycle stage race held in Essex and London as part of the UCI Women's World Tour. Part of the RideLondon cycling festival, the race was originally held as a one-day race in central London, and became a stage race in 2022 following the demise of the London–Surrey Classic.

== History ==
First held in 2013, the RideLondon festival was designed as an annual legacy of the London 2012 Olympic and Paralympic Games. The format consists of a series of cycling events on closed roads for amateur cyclists and professionals. The professional men's event – London–Surrey Classic – ran from 2013 to 2019, on a course utilising the Surrey Hills.

As part of the festival, a professional women's event (originally the RideLondon Grand Prix) was held on a central London circuit, with the finish line on The Mall. In 2016, the race was added to the UCI Women's World Tour, was renamed the RideLondon Classique, and gained an identical €100,000 prize fund to the London–Surrey Classic – making it the richest one-day race in the women's calendar. Due to the flat, short circuit in central London, the race often culminated in a sprint finish on The Mall. Both the 2020 and 2021 editions of the race were cancelled due to the COVID-19 pandemic.

Following the withdrawal of title sponsor Prudential and Surrey County Council, it was announced that RideLondon would become a one-day event in central London from 2022 – with a 3-day elite women's race as the new main event. In March 2021, a 10 year partnership with London Marathon Events to stage the event was agreed, and in November 2021, an agreement with Essex County Council was announced. In February 2022, the full route of the 3 day event was revealed – with 2 stages in Essex and a final circuit stage in central London.

The 2022 event was criticised for not providing live TV coverage for all three stages as required for inclusion in the UCI Women's World Tour – with the UCI warning that the 2023 event would be demoted to the UCI ProSeries if stages were not broadcast on live television.

The race retained its World Tour status for 2023 after the organisers provided the UCI with evidence that stages would have the required live TV coverage (All three stages were live streamed via Eurosport & BBC iPlayer). Sponsorship from Ford allowed the race to continue, with Ford signing a three-year deal.

Following announcement of the 2025 UCI Women's World Tour calendar, it was announced that the 2025 edition of the race could not take place on the date proposed by the UCI, given constraints in central London. In September 2024, the organisers announced that the event would go on hiatus in 2025. The race was not on the 2026 UCI Women's World Tour calendar. In 2026, organisers stated that the race would not return, and the event was on "indefinite pause".

== Winners ==
Year	Name	Stages	Rider	Team
2013	RideLondon Grand Prix	1	Laura Trott (GBR)	Wiggle Honda
2014	RideLondon Grand Prix	1	Giorgia Bronzini (ITA)	Wiggle Honda
2015	RideLondon Grand Prix	1	Barbara Guarischi (ITA)	Velocio-SRAM
2016	RideLondon Classique	1	Kirsten Wild (NED)	Team Hitec Products
2017	RideLondon Classique	1	Coryn Rivera (USA)	Team Sunweb
2018	RideLondon Classique	1	Kirsten Wild (NED)	Wiggle High5
2019	RideLondon Classique	1	Lorena Wiebes (NED)	Parkhotel Valkenburg
2020	RideLondon Classique	No race due to the COVID-19 pandemic		
2021	RideLondon Classique	No race due to the COVID-19 pandemic		
2022	RideLondon Classique	3	Lorena Wiebes (NED)	Team DSM
2023	RideLondon Classique	3	Charlotte Kool (NED)	Team DSM
2024	RideLondon Classique	3	Lorena Wiebes (NED)	SD Worx–Protime
