= Brompton World Championship =

Cycle race

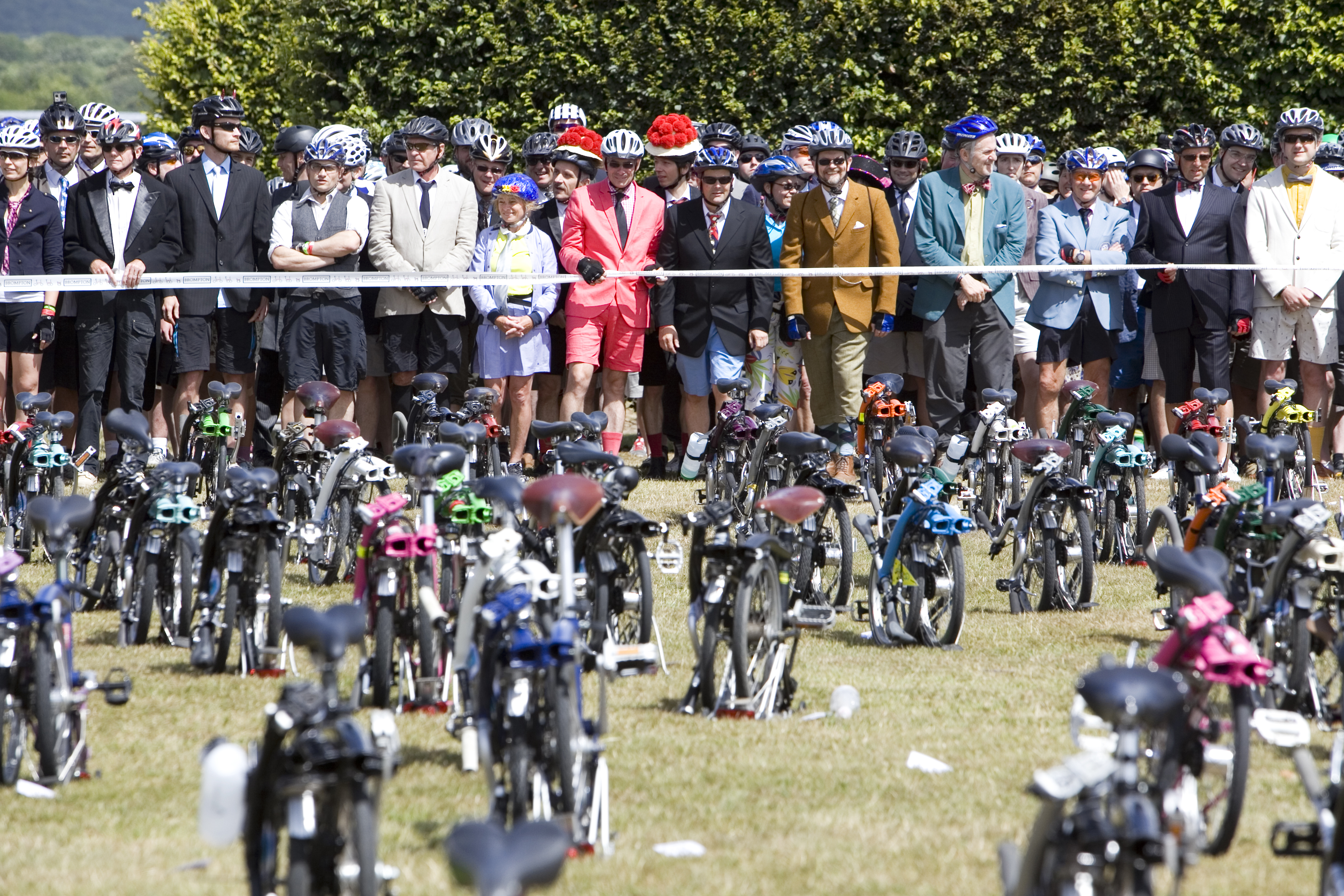
Brompton starting line at Goodwood Motor Circuit 2013

The Brompton World Championship is a promotional cycling event for Brompton Bicycle Ltd that has been held in various formats and venues since 2008.

The event consists primarily of a criterium race in which all competitors rode Brompton folding bicycles. The race typically features a Le Mans start with the competitors running to their folded bikes and unfolding them before they set off around the track. Riders are required to dress in business wear instead of standard bicycle clothing.

== History ==
The first Brompton World Championship, the inspiration of Koos Kroon, Brompton's Spanish distributor, was held on April 8, 2006 in Barcelona, Spain. The second BWC on March 17, 2007, was also in Barcelona. The race relocated to England in 2008 and was held at Blenheim Palace in Oxfordshire.

In 2013 the BWC was merged with the Orbital Festival and moved to the Goodwood Motor Circuit in Chichester, West Sussex. In 2014 the Orbital Festival was cancelled at late notice but the BWC went ahead at the same venue.

In 2015 the event moved to central London and became part of the Prudential RideLondon cycling festival, taking place annually until 2019.

The 2020 and 2021 events were cancelled due to the COVID-19 pandemic. When RideLondon returned in 2022 the BWC was absent.

The Brompton World Championship race resumed with the first event since the pandemic held in Singapore in October 2022 as part of the Tour De France Prudential Singapore Criterium.

== Basic Rules ==
- All participants in the Brompton World Championship event must wear a suit jacket, collared shirt and tie. Shorts, skirts and three-quarter length trousers may be worn if preferred, though Spandex and sportswear are not permitted. There are no restrictions regarding footwear. Participants in every event must wear a helmet.
- Participants must be 16 years or over (or 12 and over if accompanied by a responsible adult), riding a Brompton and in general good health.
- Participants may wear promotional logos or advertising slogans on their clothing on the condition of a pre-payment. No such advertising is permitted on the bikes.

== Brompton World Championship 2013-14 ==
In 2013 and 2014 the Brompton World Championship took place in the Goodwood Motor Circuit, as part of the wider Orbital Festival cycling exposition. It features three main events, with separate prizes for the category winners in each event and then the grand prize for the overall victor of the Treble.

800 entrants were expected in 2014. The Championship consists of a Le Mans style sprint start to the folded bikes before completing 4 laps – over 15 km – of the circuit.

Prizes are awarded to the three fastest male and female competitors, as well as the male and female Junior (between 12 and 18 years of age) and Veteran (over 50 years of age) winners. Teams of between 3 and 5 members are permitted and are placed according to the aggregated time of the team's top three finishers. There is also a prize awarded to the ‘Best Dressed’ male and female competitors.

Brompton Sprint

Only open to the 200 participants who have registered for the Brompton Treble, the Brompton Sprint consists of a 500m sprint organised in heats of 12 entrants before the final. There is no dress code and prizes are awarded to the fastest male, female, junior and veteran competitors.

Brompton Marathon

The Marathon consists of a 26 km untimed ride through the Sussex countryside, open to 300 participants (compulsory for the Brompton Treble entrants), with food and drink and sightseeing options organised en route. There is no dress code.

Brompton Treble

The 200 participants who compete in all three events are eligible for the Brompton Treble; the male and female competitors with the fastest times from the Sprint and the World Championship, together with successful completion of the Marathon, will be the Brompton Treble Champions.

== Brompton National Championships ==
Since 2010 many countries around the globe have held their own Brompton National Championships featuring comparative events, with the winners invited to participate in the World Championships every summer.

The list of countries that have held National Championships:

- Australia
- Austria
- Chile
- Czech Republic
- Denmark
- France
- Germany
- Italy
- Japan
- Korea
- Mexico
- Portugal
- Spain
- Sweden
- Switzerland
- Taiwan
- USA

== Results ==
Results of the Brompton World Championship races

Year	Male	Female	Venue	Reference
2006	Marti Milla	Carolina Paris	Barcelona, Spain	
2007	Arnau Rota	Carolina Paris	Barcelona, Spain	
2008	Alastair Kay	Debbie Lister	Blenheim Palace, United Kingdom	
2009	Roberto Heras	Julia Shaw	Blenheim Palace, United Kingdom	
2010	Philip Liam Curran	Rachael Elliott	Blenheim Palace, United Kingdom	
2011	Michael Hutchinson	Rachael Elliott	Orbital Festival, Goodwood Circuit, United Kingdom	
2012	Michael Hutchinson	Julia Shaw	Orbital Festival, Goodwood Circuit, United Kingdom	
2013	Michael Hutchinson	Isabel Hastie	Orbital Festival, Goodwood Circuit, United Kingdom	
2014			Orbital Festival, Goodwood Circuit, United Kingdom	
2015	Mark Emsley (GBR)	Isabel Hastie (GBR)	RideLondon cycling festival, London, United Kingdom	
2016	Mark Emsley (GBR)	Isabel Hastie (GBR)	RideLondon cycling festival, London, United Kingdom	
2017	Unai Alvarez (ESP)		RideLondon cycling festival, London, United Kingdom	
2018	Cam Gutteridge (GBR)		RideLondon cycling festival, London, United Kingdom	
2019	Alec Briggs (GBR)		RideLondon cycling festival, London, United Kingdom	
2020	No race due to the COVID-19 pandemic			
2021	No race due to the COVID-19 pandemic			
2022			Singapore	
2023			Turin, Italy	
2024			Coal Drops Yard, London, United Kingdom	
