= RideLondon =

Annual cycling festival in England

- Status: Active
- Frequency: Annually
- Country: United Kingdom
- Inaugurated: 2013
- Founder: Mayor of London, London and Partners and Transport for London and Essex County Council
- Major events: Cycling
- Organiser: London Marathon Events
- Website: RideLondon

RideLondon was an annual festival of cycling held in London. Intended as an annual legacy of the London 2012 Olympic and Paralympic Games, it was first held in 2013. The festival consists of a series of cycling events on closed roads around Greater London and Essex.

Between 2013 and 2019, the event culminated in the London–Surrey Classic, a one-day international men's road cycling race. In 2022, the RideLondon Classique – a three-day international women's road race as part of the UCI Women's World Tour – served as the flagship event.

== Current events ==
RideLondon is composed of several events held on the same weekend, currently in late May. Between 2013 and 2019, the event was held in late July, to follow the conclusion of the Tour de France.

=== RideLondon Classique ===
A three-day, international women's road race forms part of the UCI Women's World Tour. In 2022, the first two stages are held in Essex, with the final stage taking place in London. First held as a one-day race in central London in 2013, at one time the Classique awarded the highest prize money for a women's one-day race.

=== RideLondon Essex ===
Starting and finishing in London and passing through Essex, the RideLondon Essex is claimed to be sportive ride for amateur cyclists, with around over 25,000 participants. In previous years, RideLondon Surrey served as the sportive ride, with riders raising money for charities – £12.5 million in 2017. As with previous editions, routes vary in distance from 100 to 30 miles.

=== RideLondon FreeCycle ===
The RideLondon FreeCycle was created amateurs to cycle on closed roads in Central London, crossing places such as Buckingham Palace, the Bank of England, the Houses of Parliament and St. Paul's Cathedral.

== Previous events ==
=== RideLondon-Surrey Classic ===
The RideLondon-Surrey Classic was a one-day international elite men's road cycling race, held on the Sunday of the RideLondon weekend between 2013 and 2019. The route generally followed a similar route to the London 2012 Road Race with multiple circuits in and around Dorking and the Surrey Hills, before heading into London for a finish on The Mall.

=== Brompton World Championship ===
The Brompton World Championship became part of the RideLondon cycling festival in 2015. The event involved 550 riders racing around a central London circuit on folding bicycles, with a sprint finish on The Mall. Riders were mostly dressed in suits, to reflect the use of folding bikes by commuters.

=== RideLondon HandCycle races and junior races ===
The RideLondon HandCycle and Junior races were also included in the RideLondon weekend. Both elite and amateur HandCycle events were staged. The Junior categories feature boys' and girls' races for 13–16 years old.

== History ==
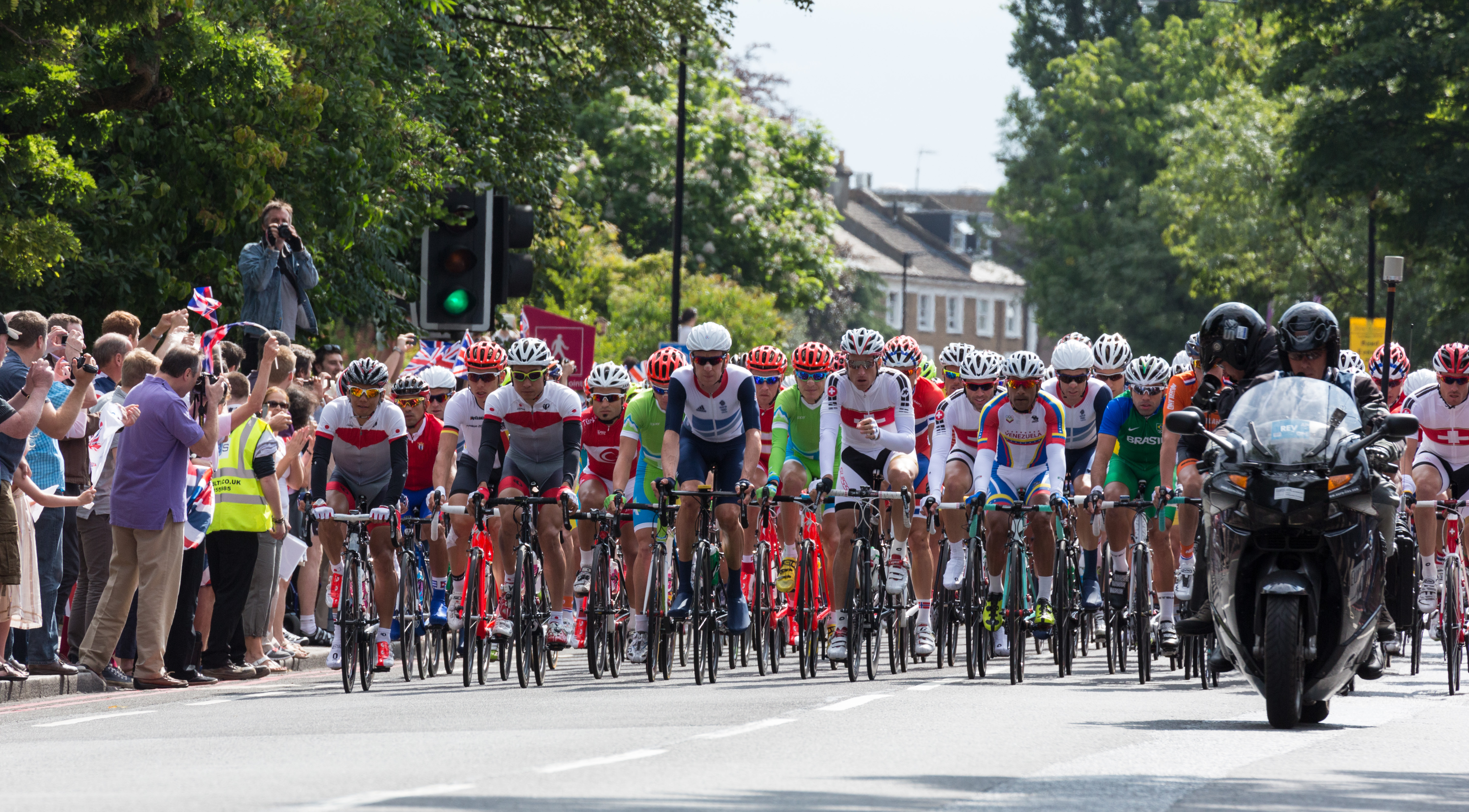
Peloton of the Men's Olympic Road Race in 2012

=== Origins ===
The origins of RideLondon can be traced back to when London was awarded the rights to stage the 2012 Olympic & Paralympic Games. Subsequently, London has staged a number of cycling events. In 2007, London hosted the Tour de France Grand Départ and, also closed roads to create a day-long safe cycling environment in the city centre, known at the time as The London Freewheel. This annual one-day event continued between 2007-2011 and, from 2009 became known as the Mayor of London's Skyride.

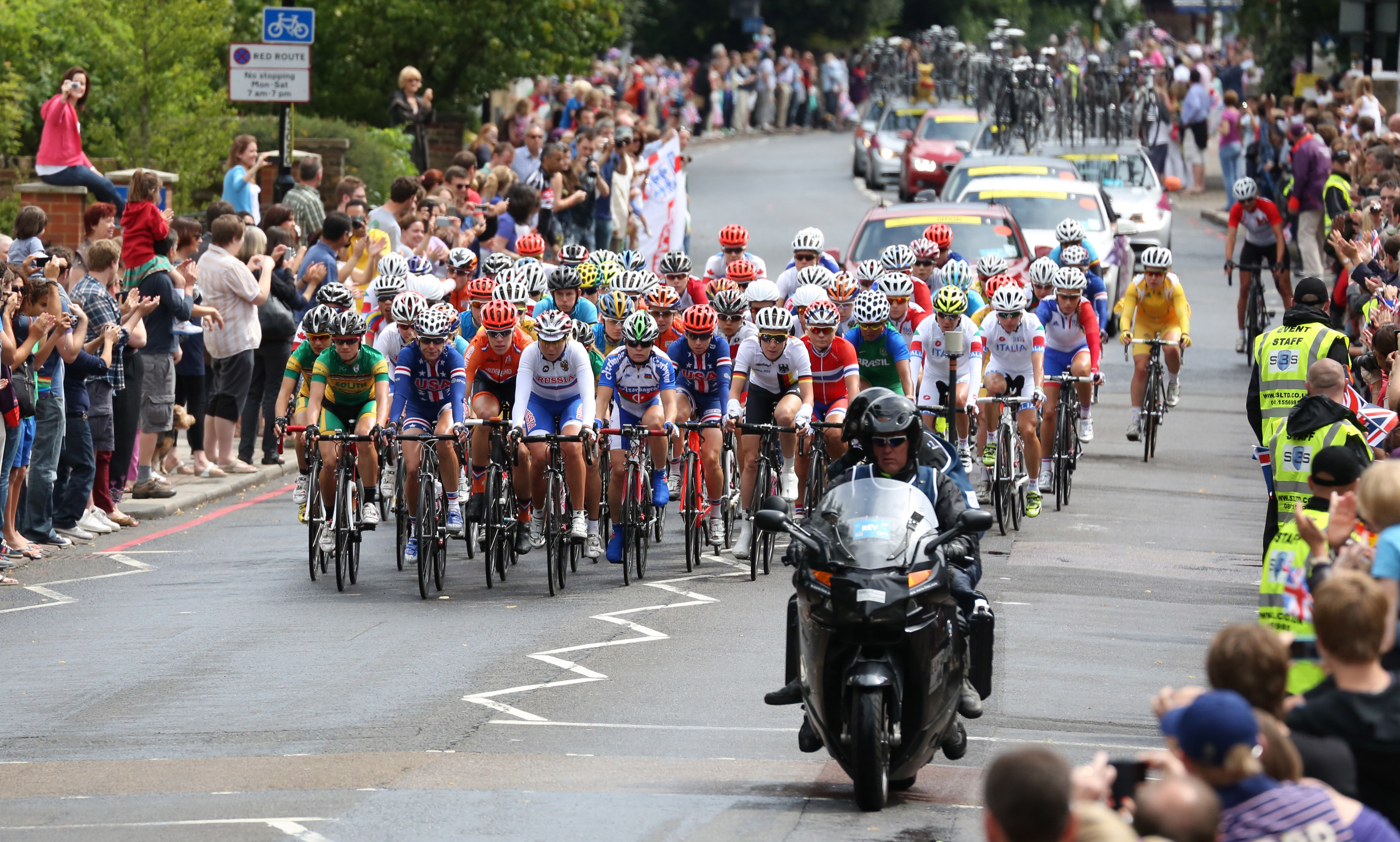
Peloton of the Women's Olympic Road Race in 2012

Ambition to create a new world-class event for cycling, that could one day rival London's most iconic sporting events such as the London Marathon and, the Wimbledon Championships, was born. The aim of the annual event is to include the world's top men, women and, hand cyclists racing as part of the international cycling calendar in order to challenge and inspire people from all backgrounds to get on two wheels. In late 2011 and early 2012, Mayor Boris Johnson assessed and formally approved the recommendation to create the event. In 2011, a test event for the Olympic Games road race was held on a similar route to be used for the road races of the Olympic Games – the London–Surrey Cycle Classic.

In 2012, the search for a suitably qualified and experienced delivery partner was launched. After detailed work, a joint venture including the organisers of the London Marathon and the Tour of Britain under the name of the London & Surrey Cycling Partnership was selected to make the event a reality. The event would be delivered in partnership with Surrey County Council and include a route through the Surrey Hills, which also mirrored the London Olympic Games road race. The event is part of the London 2012 Olympic legacy.

In August 2012, as the Olympic Games drew to a close, the Mayor of London and the London & Surrey Cycling Partnership, alongside British Cycling and double Olympic champion Laura Trott, formally launched RideLondon and called for fans to sign up to the 100-mile challenge. The event's first title sponsor, Prudential, was announced in early 2013 by which time more than 55,000 people had signed up to be one of the first riders to participate in the inaugural RideLondon-Surrey 100. This race is part of the Prudential RideLondon festival weekend with coverage to be broadcast live on BBC and international TV.

The RideLondon vision was to showcase the capital to nationwide and international audiences, generate economic benefit from participant and spectator expenditure and inspire more people to take up regular cycling.

=== Initial years ===
In 2013, more than 16,000 people started the RideLondon-Surrey 100, more than 50,000 took part in RideLondon FreeCycle and over 1,000 volunteers helped run the event. 99% of participants rated the event as good or excellent and riders in the RideLondon-Surrey 100 raised more than £7 million for charity. In 2014, over 16,000 completed the RideLondon-Surrey 100 (shortened to 86 miles due to adverse weather conditions) with 60,000 taking part in the FreeCycle and more than £10 million being raised for charity by riders in the RideLondon-Surrey 100. This set a new record for a UK one-day cycling event for a second successive year.

In response to the huge demand for the event, places were increased by 25 per cent in 2015, with more than 25,000 riders crossing the Start Line in Queen Elizabeth Olympic Park on 2 August. This year a new event was also added to the RideLondon cycling festival: the 10th Brompton World Championship Final. This event featured in the RideLondon Grand Prix races in St James's Park and was the first time that the Brompton World Championship Final had been held in London. The event opened with a Le Mans-style start as 500 smartly dressed competitors from around the world made a mad dash to unfold their bikes before setting off on the circuit. Six Festival Zones (up from five in 2014) in RideLondon FreeCycle offered riders a chance to stop and enjoy a huge range of free bike-based entertainment and to try out many different bike-based activities. The women's RideLondon Grand Prix race was also one of the biggest one-day races on the international calendar and was again televised live by the BBC.

=== 2016 to 2021 ===
In 2016, a new 46-mile event was launched by Bradley Wiggins specifically for newer and younger cyclists. The RideLondon-Surrey 46 on traffic-free roads starts at Queen Elizabeth Olympic Park and follows the same route as RideLondon-Surrey 100 for the first 27 miles before taking a new two-mile route, which then links up with the last 17 miles to the finish in The Mall.

The RideLondon Grand Prix was renamed the RideLondon Classique, the race was added to the UCI Women's World Tour, and it gained an identical €100,000 prize fund to the London–Surrey Classic – making it the richest one-day race in the women's calendar. In 2017, the RideLondon-Surrey Classic gained UCI World Tour status, the only event in Britain. Riders in the RideLondon-Surrey 100 and RideLondon-Surrey 46 together raised £12.75 million for charity.

The 2020 and 2021 events were cancelled due to the COVID-19 pandemic. In 2020, Surrey County Council withdrew their support of the event at the end of their contract.

=== 2022 to present ===
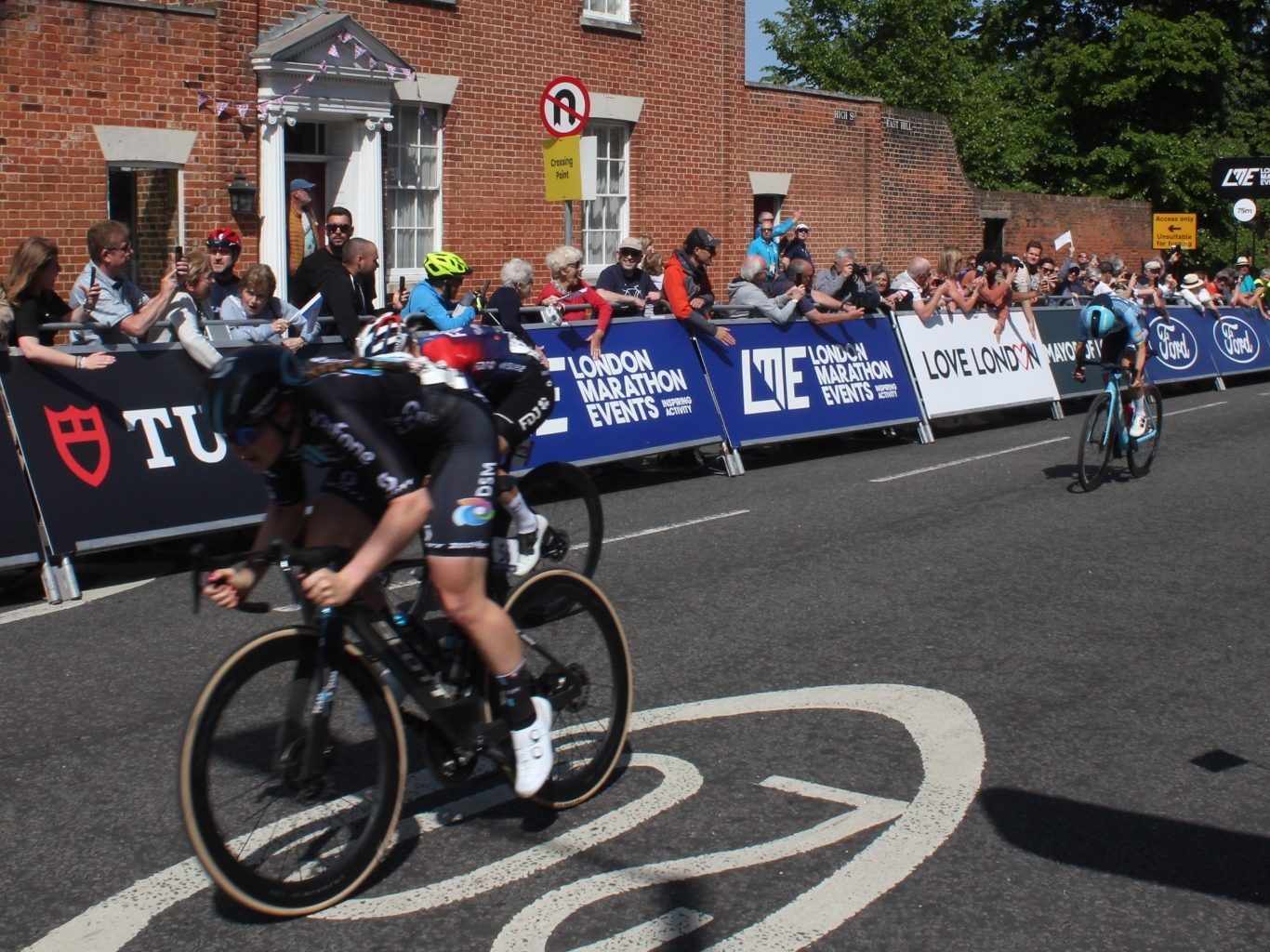
Charlotte Kool racing for the finish line at the 2023 RideLondon Classique

Following the withdrawal of sponsors Prudential and Surrey County Council, from 2022 RideLondon became a one-day event in Central London, with a 3-day elite women's race (RideLondon Classique) as the main event, as well as a public freeride. In March 2021, a 10-year partnership with London Marathon Events to stage the event was agreed. In June 2021, organizers confirmed that the men's race would not return in 2022. In November 2021, an agreement with Essex County Council was announced, with Essex hosting both the 100 mile challenge ride, as well as two stages of an elite women's race.

The 2022 event was criticised for not providing live TV coverage for all three stages as required for inclusion in the UCI Women's World Tour – with the UCI warning that the 2023 event would be demoted to the UCI ProSeries if stages were not broadcast on live television. The race retained its World Tour status for 2023 after the organisers provided the UCI with evidence that stages would have the required live TV coverage.

Following announcement of the 2025 UCI Women's World Tour calendar, it was announced that the 2025 edition of RideLondon Classique could not take place on the date proposed by the UCI, given constraints in central London. In September 2024, the organisers announced that the event would go on hiatus in 2025. In 2026, organisers stated that the race would not return, and the event was on "indefinite pause".

== Results ==
Year	Men's Elite 'London–Surrey Classic'	Women's Elite 'RideLondon Classique'
2011	Mark Cavendish (GBR), Great Britain national team	Not held
2012	No race (see 2012 Olympics Men's road race)	No race (see 2012 Olympics Women's road race)
2013	Arnaud Démare (FRA), FDJ.fr	Laura Trott (GBR), Wiggle Honda
2014	Adam Blythe (GBR), NFTO Pro Cycling	Giorgia Bronzini (ITA), Wiggle Honda
2015	Jempy Drucker (LUX), BMC Racing Team	Barbara Guarischi (ITA), Velocio-SRAM
2016	Tom Boonen (BEL), Etixx–Quick-Step team	Kirsten Wild (NED), Team Hitec Products
2017	Alexander Kristoff (NOR), Katusha-Alpecin team	Coryn Rivera (USA), Team Sunweb
2018	Pascal Ackermann (GER), Bora–Hansgrohe	Kirsten Wild (NED), Wiggle High5
2019	Elia Viviani (ITA), Deceuninck–Quick-Step	Lorena Wiebes (NED), Parkhotel Valkenburg
2020	No race due to the COVID-19 pandemic	
2021	No race due to the COVID-19 pandemic	
2022	Not held	Lorena Wiebes (NED), Team DSM
2023	Not held	Charlotte Kool (NED), Team DSM
2024	Not held	Lorena Wiebes (NED), Team SD Worx–Protime
