= Charlotte Kool =

Dutch cyclist (born 1999)

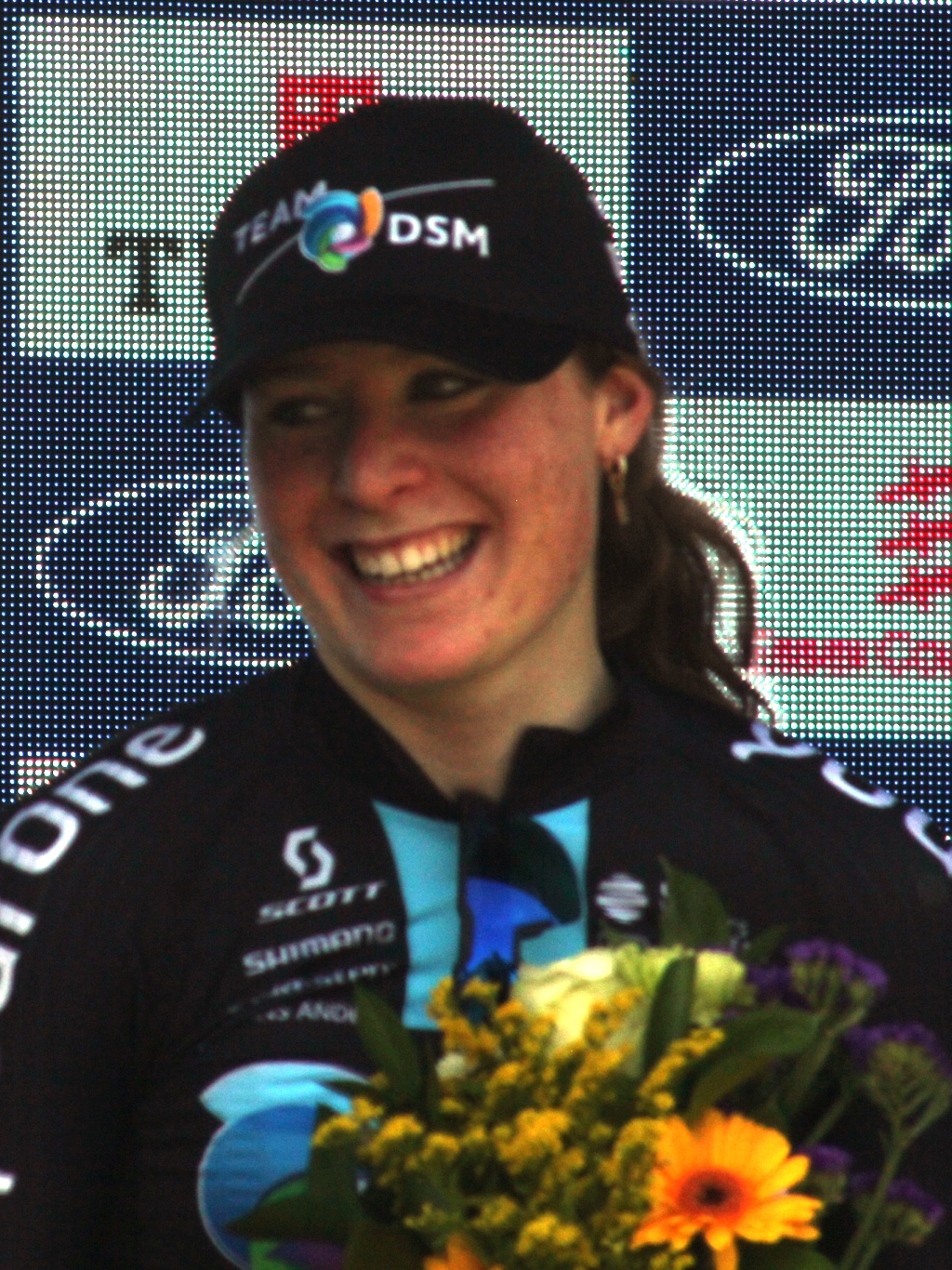
- Charlotte Kool at the RideLondon Classique in 2023

Personal information
- Born: 6 May 1999 (age 27) Blaricum, Netherlands

Cycling career
- Sport: Cycling
- Current team: Fenix–Premier Tech
- Discipline: Road
- Role: Rider

Amateur teams
- 2017: Het Stadion
- 2018–2019: GRC Jan van Arckel

Professional teams
- 2020–2021: NXTG Racing
- 2022–2025: Team DSM
- 2025-: Fenix–Deceuninck

Major wins
- Major Tours Tour de France 2 individual stages (2024) La Vuelta Femenina 1 individual stage (2023)

Charlotte Kool (born 6 May 1999) is a Dutch professional racing cyclist, who currently rides for UCI Women's World Tour Team Fenix–Premier Tech. In October 2020, she rode in the 2020 Three Days of Bruges–De Panne race in Belgium.

== Major results ==
2016
2nd Road race, National Junior Road Championships
2019
2nd MerXem Classic
2020
2nd Grote Prijs Euromat
6th Omloop van het Hageland
2021
1st Grand Prix d'Isbergues
1st Stage 2a Baloise Ladies Tour
2nd Grand Prix du Morbihan Féminin
2nd Drentse Acht van Westerveld
10th Scheldeprijs
2022
1st GP Eco-Struct
1st Stage 3 Holland Ladies Tour
6th Drentse Acht van Westerveld
10th Scheldeprijs
2023
1st Overall RideLondon Classique

1st Points classification
1st Stages 1 & 3

1st Omloop der Kempen
UAE Tour

1st Points classification
1st Stage 1 & 4

1st Stage 2 La Vuelta Femenina
2nd Scheldeprijs
3rd Dwars door de Westhoek
2024
Tour de France

1st Stages 1 & 2
Held after Stages 1–2
Held after Stages 1–5

2nd Classic Brugge–De Panne
2nd Scheldeprijs
2nd Overall RideLondon Classique
4th Gent–Wevelgem
4th Binche–Chimay–Binche
6th Overall Baloise Ladies Tour

1st Stage 2

7th Le Samyn
2025
2nd Dutch National Road Race Championships
2nd Scheldeprijs
3rd Gent–Wevelgem
4th Copenhagen Sprint
4th Binche–Chimay–Binche
6th Overall Baloise Ladies Tour

1st Stage 1

8th Omloop van het Hageland
2026
1st Omloop van het Hageland
1st Veenendaal-Veenendaal
1st GP Mazda Schelkens
1st GP Lucien Van Impe
2nd Copenhagen Sprint
9th Milan–San Remo Women
7th Dwars door Vlaanderen
7th Paris–Roubaix

=== General classification results ===
Major Tours	2020	2021	2022	2023	2024	2025
La Vuelta Femenina	DNE			DNF	91	—
Giro Rosa	—	—	104	—	—	—
Tour de France Femmes	DNE		DNF	DNF	DNF	DNF
Stage race	2020	2021	2022	2023	2024	2025
Tour of Britain Women	NH	—	55	NH	46	25
RideLondon Classique	NH		38	1	2	NH
Holland Ladies Tour	NH	DNF	DNF	49	—	—
UAE Tour Women	DNE			68	—	64

=== Classics results timeline ===
Monuments	2020	2021	2022	2023	2024	2025
Tour of Flanders	—	—	87	—	—	—
Paris–Roubaix	NH	OTL	85	62	90	51
Classic	2020	2021	2022	2023	2024	2025
Classic Brugge–De Panne	27	DNF	53	69	2	15
Gent–Wevelgem	85	DNF	61	DNF	4	3
Ronde van Drenthe	NH	14	—	—	11	—
Omloop Het Nieuwsblad	DNF	DNF	91	97	—	—

=== Major championships results ===
Event		2018	2019	2020	2021	2022	2023	2024	2025
European Championships	Road race	—	—	—	—	44	—	—	—
National Championships	Time trial	28	30	NH	—	—	—	—	—
National Championships	Road race	23	78	DNF	—	DNF	14	16	2

Legend
—	Did not compete
DNF	Did not finish
OTL	Outside time limit
DNE	Did not exist
IP	In progress
NH	Not held
