= Kukuxumusu =

Spanish clothing and product design company

Ataute, S.L.
- Trade name: Kukuxumusu
- Type: Sociedad Limitada
- Industry: Retail
- Founded: Pamplona, Spain (March 9, 2006)
- Founder: Mikel Urmeneta; Koldo Aiestaran; Gonzalo Dominguez de Bidaurreta
- Headquarters: Pamplona, Spain
- Area served: Nationwide
- Key people: Mikel Urmeneta, Creative Director
- Products: Souvenirs
- Website: kukuxumusu.com

Ataute, S.L., better known by its trading name Kukuxumusu (Basque: /kukuʃumus̺u/), is a Spanish company from Pamplona, Navarra specialising in clothing and product design. Its name means flea kiss in Basque.

The company was founded in 1989 Pamplona's San Fermín festival. Three friends made souvenir T-shirts depicting the bull-running and bull fights. The company gradually grew and is now one of the key images of San Fermín; in addition to clothing they also produce other goods such as chinaware, keyrings and postcards. Kukuxumusu has exclusive shops in Pamplona and all the main cities within the Basque Country and also in the rest of Spain. Moreover its products are sold elsewhere in over sixty countries.

Kukuxumusu's designs are distinctive for their style and humour. Their most famous designs involve bulls and the San Fermín runners in their traditional red and white clothing, but adding some absurd elements. Bulls may be seen chasing the runners over the sea on surfboards, or apparently uninterested in the San Fermín activities. In some designs, the roles of humans and bulls are reversed. Other designs often involve animals, devils or Basque symbols such as the lauburu in humorous situations. Kukuxumusu's designs have grown to include other Spanish regions festivals and typical elements and have, therefore, become a popular souvenir in Spain.

Kukuxumusu has added computer screensavers and virtual postcards, with their usual unique humour to their line of clothing and souvenirs.
