= Will Butler-Adams =

British businessman

Will Butler-Adams OBE, FRGS
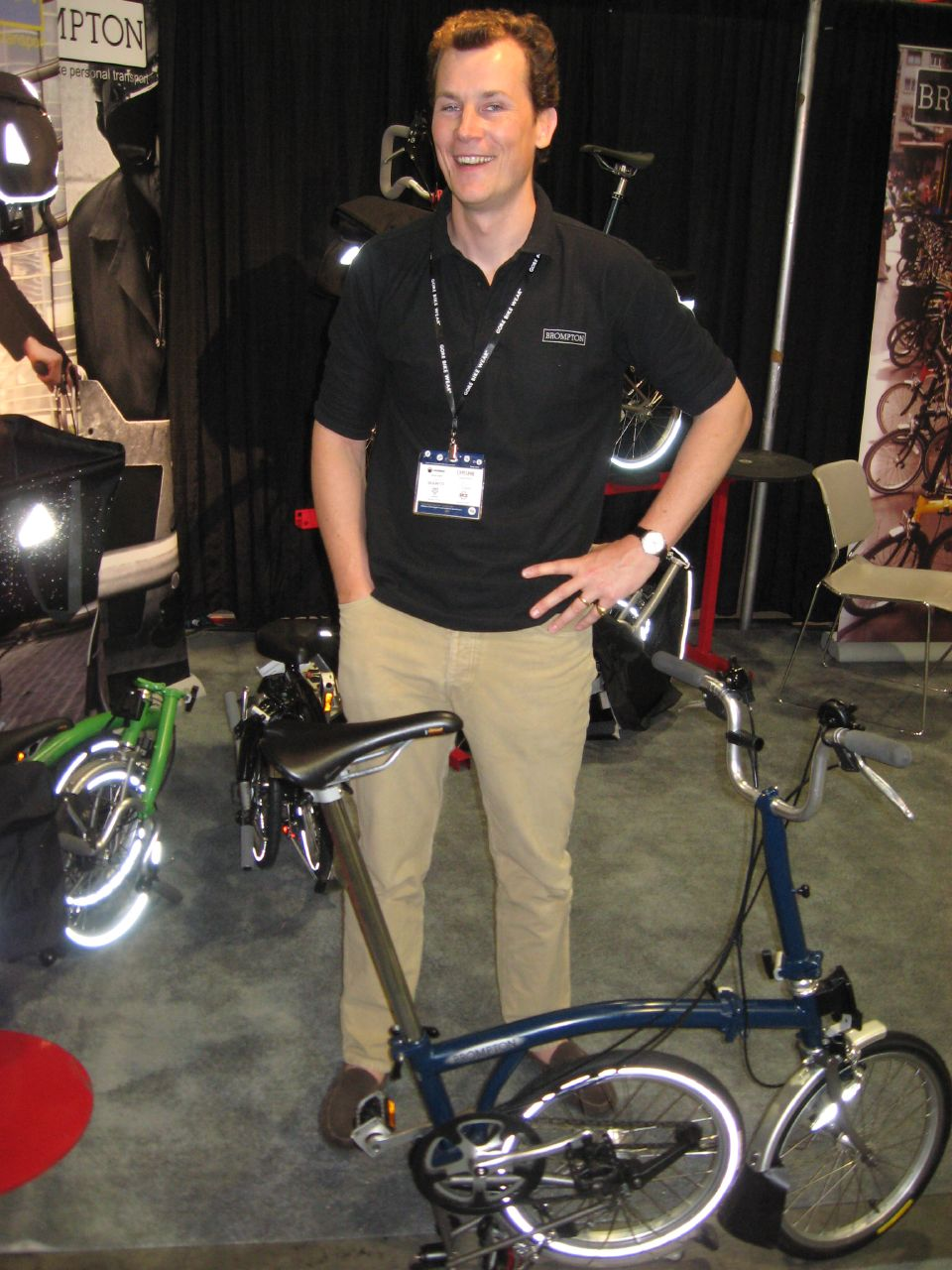
- Born: William David Butler-Adams; 11 May 1974 (age 52); London
- Education: Newcastle University
- Spouse: Sarah Georgina MacIntyre (m. 2004)
- Children: Three daughters
- Website: twitter.com/will_brompton

William David Butler-Adams (born 11 May 1974 in London) OBE FRGS is the managing director of Brompton Bicycle Limited a manufacturer based in the United Kingdom and Brompton Bike Hire Limited a provider of bicycle-sharing systems.

== Education and early life ==
Butler-Adams was born in London, the last of four children of Rosalie, daughter of Major General William Pat Arthur Bradshaw and David Bernard Butler-Adams (b. 1939), a wine merchant. David's father was Derek Butler-Adams (1908–1996). David's mother was Beatrice Margaret Baker (1911–1994), the latter by whom William David Butler-Adams is related to Anglican priest Robin Griffith-Jones, cricket enthusiast Nigel Baker and British politician Peter Baker.

Butler-Adams was educated at Aysgarth School in Yorkshire and Rugby School from 1987 to 1992 in Warwickshire. He was awarded a first class Master of Engineering (MEng) degree in Mechanical engineering from Newcastle University in 1997. During his degree he studied the Spanish language at the University of Valladolid in Spain.

== Career ==
He started his career as a project manager for Imperial Chemical Industries (ICI) where he worked from 1997 to 2000 and continued as a Plant Manager for DuPont from 2000 to 2002. He joined Brompton at the age of 28, following a serendipitous meeting with the company's chairman, Tim Guinness, on a coach journey.

At Brompton, he was promoted to director in 2006 and managing director (aka CEO) in 2008. Since 2002, Brompton has increased in size by an order of magnitude, from around 27 employees to over 200 employees while turnover has increased from around £2 million to £25 million. As of 2016 he serves as a commissioner on the UK Commission for Employment and Skills.

== Awards and honours ==
Butler-Adams has been a member of the Institution of Mechanical Engineers (MIMechE) since 1993 and a Fellow (FIMechE) since 2014. He qualified as a Chartered Engineer (CEng) in 2001 and has been a Fellow of the Royal Geographical Society since 2013. He was appointed Order of the British Empire (OBE) in the 2015 New Year Honours. He was elected a Fellow of the Royal Academy of Engineering in 2024.

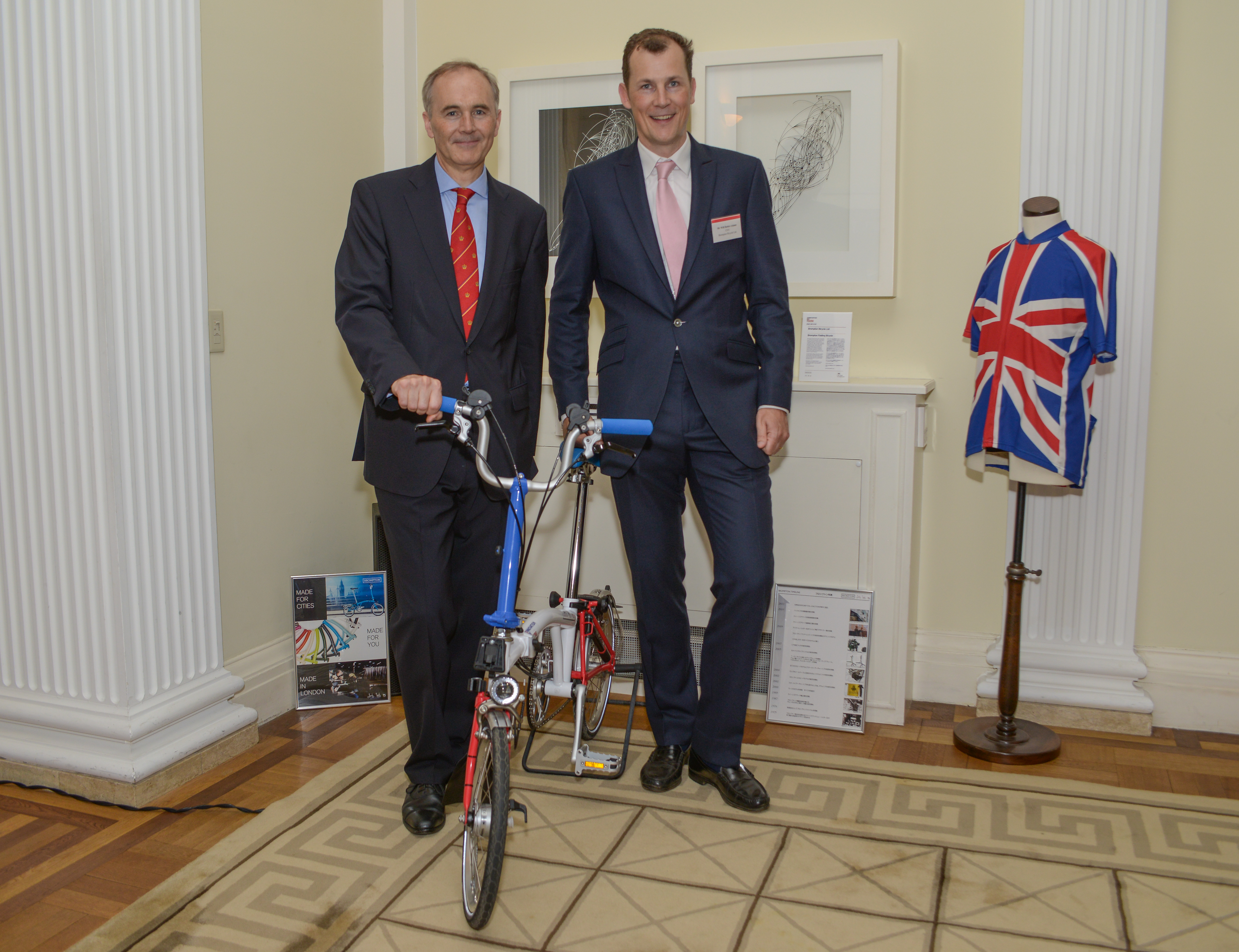
Will Butler-Adams (right) with the British Ambassador to Japan Tim Hitchens (left) in 2015.

== Personal life ==
Butler-Adams married Sarah Georgina MacIntyre in 2004 and has three daughters. His recreations include aviation (he holds a private pilot licence) and wine (he has been a Liveryman of the Worshipful Company of Vintners since 2010).

Other recreations include travel and the environment: in 1995 he led a nine-week expedition up the Amazon River, which was the subject of a Channel 4 documentary and also led an expedition to summit of Aconcagua in 2000, which raised over £130,000 for charitable causes.
