= Torelli (cycling team) =

Irish cycling team

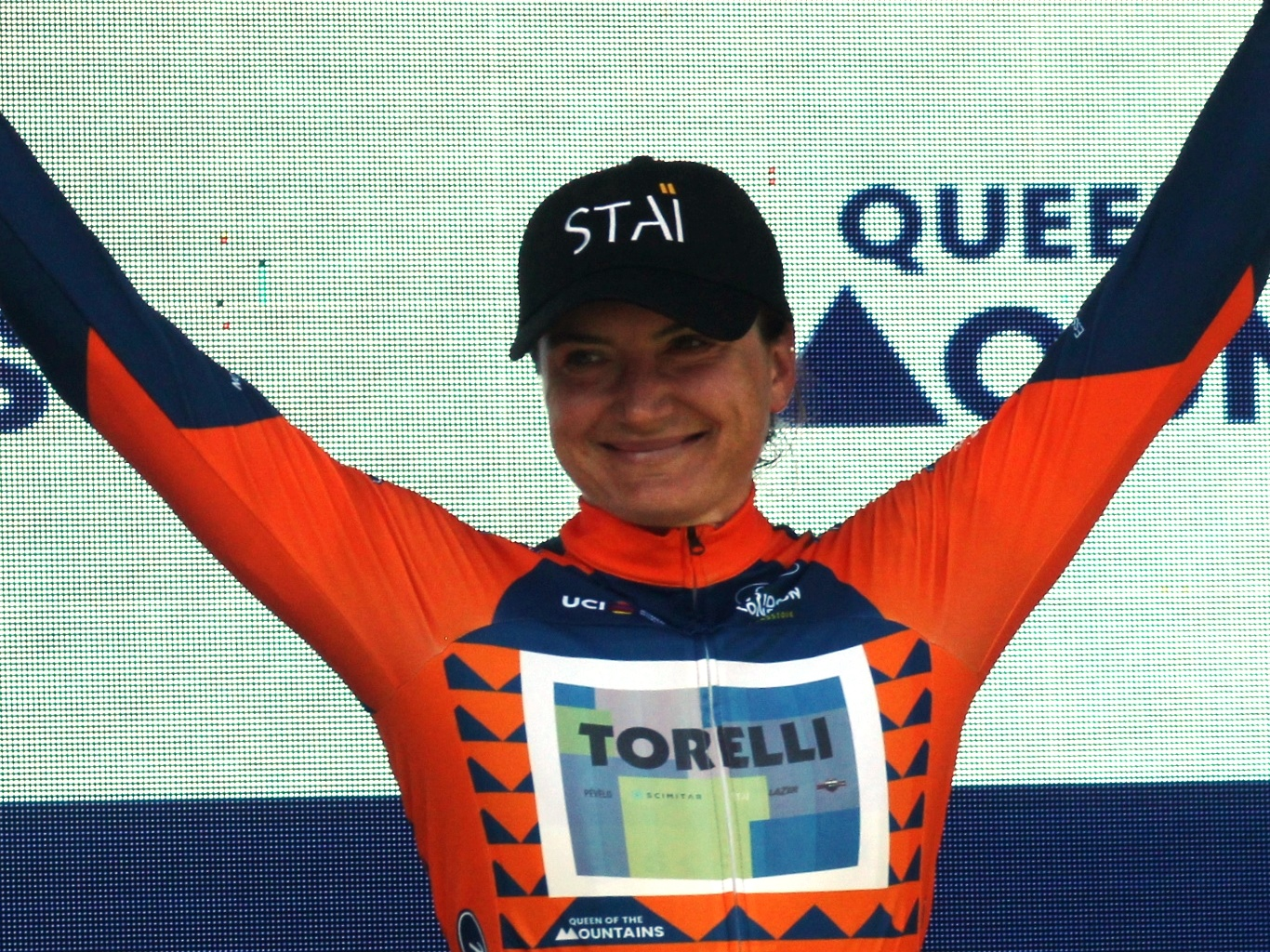
- Hanna Johansson, Queen of the Mountains at the 2023 RideLondon Classique

Team information
- UCI code: TOR (2017–)
- Registered: Ireland
- Founded: 2017
- Discipline: Road
- Status: National (2017–2021); UCI Women's Continental Team (2022–)

Team name history
- 2017 2018 2019 2020 2021–2022 2023: NCC Group–Kuota–Torelli; Torelli–Beastwear–Brother; Torelli–Assure; Weston Homes–Torelli–Assure-Fred Whitton; Torelli–Assure–Cayman Islands–Scimitar; Torelli

Torelli is an Irish women's road cycling team that was founded in 2017, before registering with the UCI for the 2022 season.

Hanna Johansson won their first UCI Women's World Tour jersey by winning the Mountains classification at the 2023 RideLondon Classique.

== Team roster ==
As of 14 August 2024

Rider	Date of birth
Awa Bamogo (BUR)	15 June 1999 (age 27)
Kim Baptista (GBR)	27 December 2000 (age 25)
Ori Bash (ISR)	26 May 2004 (age 22)
Isabella Escalera (ESP)	1 July 2003 (age 23)
Neah Evans (GBR)	1 August 1990 (age 36)
Mary Flynn (IRL)	1 July 2000 (age 26)
Michelle Geoghegan (IRL)	21 June 1982 (age 44)
Annamarie Lipp (NZL)	18 June 2000 (age 26)
Bronwyn Macgregor (NZL)	12 November 1982 (age 43)

Rider	Date of birth
Oliwia Majewska (POL)	1 July 2000 (age 26)
Ida Mechlenborg (DEN)	21 March 2004 (age 22)
Fiona Murray (IRL)	15 April 1999 (age 27)
Lucy Nelson (GBR)	30 August 2000 (age 26)
Martina Puiatti (ITA)	14 June 2003 (age 23)
Francesca Selva (ITA)	17 April 1999 (age 27)
Maayan Tzur (ISR)	28 December 2004 (age 21)
Cristina Vila Salvans (ESP)	17 April 1996 (age 30)
Amalie Winther Olsen (DEN)	12 January 1994 (age 32)

== Major results ==
2018
Stage 2 Ras na mBan, Rhona Callander
UCI Track Cycling World – Berlin (Team pursuit), Emily Kay

2023
RideLondon Classique

Mountains classification, Hanna Johansson

Stage 1 Princess Anna Vasa Tour, Camilla Rånes Bye

== National champions ==
2017
National Track (Team sprint), Autumn Collins

2019
National Track (Omnium), Lydia Boylan
National Track (Madison), Autumn Collins

2021
National Junior Road Race, Aoife O'Brien

2022
New Zealand Under-23 Time Trial, Kim Cadzow
