= 2023 RideLondon Classique =

2023 UCI Women's World Tour, race 18 of 27
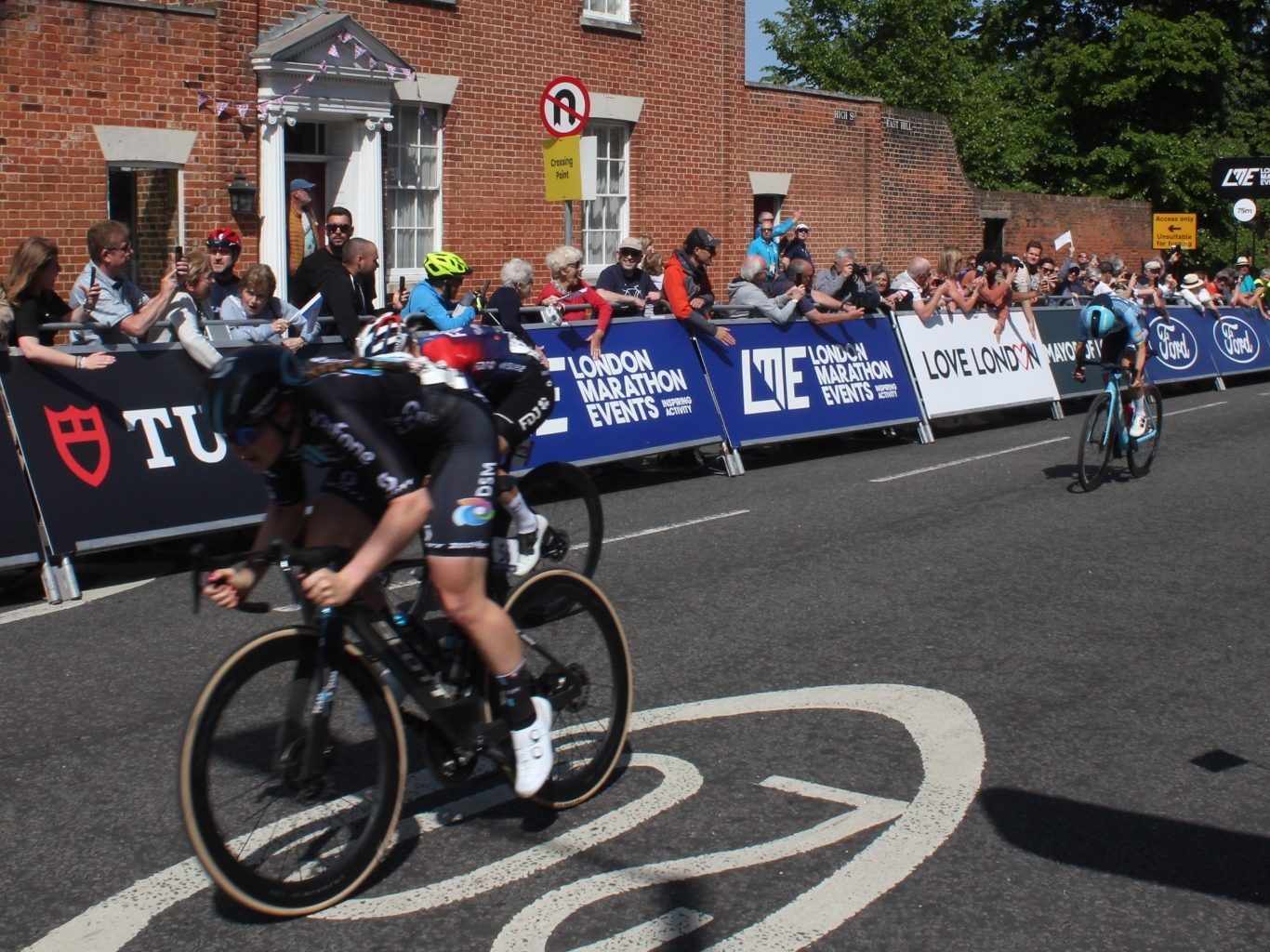
- Charlotte Kool leads the sprint for the line on Stage One

Race details
- Dates: 26–28 May
- Stages: 3
- Distance: 370.7 km (230.3 mi)
- Winning time: 9h 34' 41"

Results
Jersey awarded to the overall winner	Winner	Charlotte Kool (NED)	(Team DSM)
	Second	Chloé Dygert (USA)	(Canyon//SRAM)
	Third	Lizzie Deignan (GBR)	(Trek–Segafredo)
Jersey awarded to the mountains classification winner	Mountains	Hanna Johansson (SWE)	(Torelli)
Jersey awarded to the youth classification winner	Youth	Eleonora Gasparrini (ITA)	(UAE Team ADQ)
Jersey awarded to the sprints classification winner	Sprints	Charlotte Kool (NED)	(Team DSM)
	Team	Team Jumbo–Visma	

The 2023 RideLondon Classique was a British women's cycle stage race that was held in Essex and London, as part of the UCI Women's World Tour. Taking place from 26 to 28 May 2023, the race was the ninth edition of the RideLondon Classique, part of the RideLondon cycling festival. It was won by Dutch rider Charlotte Kool of Team DSM.

== Teams ==
The following teams took part in the race:

UCI Women's World Teams

- Canyon//SRAM
- FDJ–Suez
- Israel Premier Tech Roland
- Liv Racing TeqFind
- Team DSM
- Team Jumbo–Visma
- Trek–Segafredo
- UAE Team ADQ
- Uno-X Pro Cycling Team

UCI Women's Continental Teams

- AWOL O'Shea
- Bepink
- Ceratizit–WNT Pro Cycling
- Cofidis
- DAS–Handsling
- Lifeplus Wahoo
- Parkhotel Valkenburg
- St. Michel–Mavic–Auber93
- Team Coop–Hitec Products
- Torelli

== Route and stages ==
The route consisted of two road stages in Essex followed by the final stage in London.

Stage characteristics
Stage	Date	Course	Distance	Winner
1	26 May	Saffron Walden to Colchester	146.4 km (91.0 mi)	Charlotte Kool (NED)
2	27 May	Maldon to Maldon	133.1 km (82.7 mi)	Chloé Dygert (USA)
3	28 May	London to London	91.2 km (56.7 mi)	Charlotte Kool (NED)
Total			370.7 km (230.3 mi)	

== Classification leadership table ==
Classification leadership by stage
Stage	Winner	General classification	Sprints classification	Mountains classification	Young rider classification	British rider classification	Team classification
1	Charlotte Kool	Charlotte Kool	Charlotte Kool	Hanna Johansson	Eleonora Gasparrini	Lizzie Deignan	Canyon-SRAM
2	Chloé Dygert	Charlotte Kool	Charlotte Kool	Hanna Johansson	Eleonora Gasparrini	Lizzie Deignan	Team Jumbo-Visma
3	Charlotte Kool	Charlotte Kool	Charlotte Kool	Hanna Johansson	Eleonora Gasparrini	Lizzie Deignan	Team Jumbo-Visma
Final		Charlotte Kool	Charlotte Kool	Hanna Johansson	Eleonora Gasparrini	Lizzie Deignan	Team Jumbo-Visma
