= 2025 in women's road cycling =

2025 in women's road cycling is about the 2025 women's bicycle races ruled by the UCI and the 2025 UCI Women's Teams.

== World Championships ==
The 2025 UCI Road World Championships were held in Kigali, Rwanda in September 2025.

== Single day races (1.1 and 1.2) ==
Race	Date	Cat. †	Winner	Second	Third	Ref
(Guyana) Caribbean Road Championships ITT	2 November 2024	1.2	(Cuba) Daymelín Pérez	(Guadeloupe) Bérénice Paul	(Bermuda) Gabriella Arnold	
(Guyana) Caribbean Road Championships RR	2 November 2024	1.2	(Jamaica) Llori Sharpe	(Dominican Republic) Flor Espiritusanto	(Cuba) Daymelín Pérez	
(Spain) Trofeo Marratxi-Felanitx	25 January 2025	1.1	(Finland) Lotta Henttala; EF Education–Oatly	(Italy) Chiara Consonni; Canyon//SRAM Zondacrypto	(Canada) Maggie Coles-Lyster; Human Powered Health	
(Spain) Trofeo Palma Femina	26 January 2025	1.1	(Switzerland) Marlen Reusser; Movistar Team	Mavi García; Spain (national team)	(Italy) Silvia Persico; UAE Team Emirates XRG	
(Spain) Trofeo Binissalem-Andratx	27 January 2025	1.1	(Netherlands) Thalita de Jong; Human Powered Health	(Italy) Silvia Persico; UAE Team Emirates XRG	(France) Cédrine Kerbaol; EF Education–Oatly	
(Australia) Surf Coast Classic	29 January 2025	1.1	(New Zealand) Ally Wollaston; FDJ–Suez	(United States) Chloé Dygert; Canyon//SRAM Zondacrypto	(Australia) Georgia Baker; Liv AlUla Jayco	
(Spain) Clásica de Almería Femenina	23 February 2025	1.1	(New Zealand) Ally Wollaston; FDJ–Suez	(Switzerland) Linda Zanetti; Uno-X Mobility	(Poland) Dominika Włodarczyk; UAE Team ADQ	
(Belgium) Omloop van het Hageland	2 March 2025	1.1	(Netherlands) Femke Gerritse; Team SD Worx–Protime	(Republic of Ireland) Lara Gillespie; UAE Team ADQ	(Norway) Susanne Andersen; Uno-X Mobility	
(Belgium) Le Samyn	4 March 2025	1.1	(Netherlands) Lorena Wiebes; Team SD Worx–Protime	(Switzerland) Linda Zanetti; Uno-X Mobility	(Republic of Ireland) Lara Gillespie; UAE Team ADQ	
(Croatia) UMAG Classic Ladies	5 March 2025	1.1	(Italy) Lara Crestanello; Born to Win BTC City Ljubljana Zhiraf	(Italy) Emma Bernardi; Team Mendelspeck E-Work	(Belgium) Cato Cassiers; DD Group Pro Cycling Team	
(Croatia) POREČ Classic Ladies	9 March 2025	1.2	(Netherlands) Manon de Boer; DD Group Pro Cycling Team	(Poland) Malwina Mul; MAT Atom Deweloper Wrocław	Varvara Fasoi; Greece (national team)	
(Italy) Trofeo Oro in Euro	9 March 2025	1.1	(Netherlands) Karlijn Swinkels; UAE Team ADQ	(Netherlands) Puck Pieterse; Fenix–Deceuninck	(Poland) Dominika Włodarczyk; UAE Team ADQ	
(Belgium) Midwest Cycling Classic	23 March 2025	1.2	(Netherlands) Scarlett Souren; VolkerWessels Cycling Team	(Italy) Martina Alzini; Cofidis	(Netherlands) Lonneke Uneken; VolkerWessels Cycling Team	
(El Salvador) Grand Prix Boquerón	1 April 2025	1.1	(Switzerland) Petra Stiasny; Roland	(France) Dilyxine Miermont; Ceratizit Pro Cycling	(France) Morgane Coston; Roland	
(Netherlands) Volta NXT Classic	5 April 2025	1.2	Femke Gerritse; Netherlands (national team)	(Netherlands) Meike Uiterwijk Winkel; BePink–Imatra–Bongioanni	(Netherlands) Lonneke Uneken; VolkerWessels Cycling Team	(Note: National Netherlands women's competition points ranking.)
Grand Prix El Salvador	8 April 2025	1.1	(Italy) Laura Tomasi; Laboral Kutxa–Fundación Euskadi	(Italy) Sara Fiorin; Ceratizit Pro Cycling	(Republic of Ireland) Mia Griffin; Roland	
(France) Région Pays de la Loire Tour féminin	9 April 2025	1.2	(Netherlands) Anneke Dijkstra; VolkerWessels Cycling Team	(Netherlands) Anne Knijnenburg; VolkerWessels Cycling Team	(Poland) Karolina Perekitko; Winspace Orange Seal	
(Belgium) Scheldeprijs	9 April 2025	1.1	(Italy) Elisa Balsamo; Lidl–Trek	(Netherlands) Charlotte Kool; Team Picnic–PostNL	(Italy) Chiara Consonni; Canyon//SRAM Zondacrypto	
(El Salvador) Grand Prix Presidente	9 April 2025	1.1	(France) Dilyxine Miermont; Ceratizit Pro Cycling	(France) Morgane Coston; Roland	(Switzerland) Petra Stiasny; Roland	
(El Salvador) Grand Prix Surf City	10 April 2025	1.1	(Poland) Kaja Rysz; Roland	(Italy) Laura Tomasi; Laboral Kutxa–Fundación Euskadi	(Italy) Sara Fiorin; Ceratizit Pro Cycling	
(Guatemala) Elite Road Central American Championships ITT	11 April 2025	1.2	(Guatemala) Gabriela Soto	(Costa Rica) Milagro Mena	(Panama) Wendy Ducreux	
(Guatemala) Elite Road Central American Championships TTT	12 April 2025	1.2	Guatemala (GUA); Cynthia Lee; Nadia Pivaral; Ashley Méndez; Hiayra Leonardo; Hannea Puac; Gabriela Soto	Costa Rica (CRC); Dixiana Quesada; Marisol García; Diandra Ramírez; Sofía Quirós; Krissia Araya; Milagro Mena	Panama (PAN); Wendy Ducreux; Viannette Herrera; Maraya López; Noemí Atencio; Abigail Moran	
(Guatemala) Elite Road Central American Championships RR	13 April 2025	1.2	(Guatemala) Gabriela Soto	(Panama) Wendy Ducreux	(Costa Rica) Milagro Mena	
(France) Grand Prix Féminin de Chambéry	20 April 2025	1.1	(Italy) Erica Magnaldi; UAE Team ADQ	(Austria) Mona Mitterwallner; Human Powered Health	(France) Léa Curinier; FDJ–Suez	
(Belgium) Ronde de Mouscron	21 April 2025	1.1	(Norway) Susanne Andersen; Uno-X Mobility	(Belgium) Marthe Truyen; Fenix–Deceuninck	(Canada) Sarah Van Dam; Ceratizit Pro Cycling	
(Italy) Gran Premio Della Liberazione Donne	25 April 2025	1.1	(Spain) Paula Blasi; UAE Team ADQ	(Italy) Silvia Milesi; BePink–Imatra–Bongioanni	(Italy) Sofia Bertizzolo; UAE Team ADQ	
(Belgium) GP Immo Zone	3 May 2025	1.1	(Belgium) Julie Stockman; Citymesh–Customm Pro Cycling Team	(Belgium) Jesse Vandenbulcke; De Ceuster Acrog Cycling Team	(Netherlands) Puck Langenbarg; Fenix-Deceuninck Development Team	
(Luxembourg) Festival Elsy Jacobs Garnich	3 May 2025	1.1	(Poland) Marta Lach; Team SD Worx–Protime	(Italy) Maria Giulia Confalonieri; Uno-X Mobility	(Canada) Sarah Van Dam; Ceratizit Pro Cycling	
Festival Elsy Jacobs Luxembourg	4 May 2025	1.1	(Italy) Martina Fidanza; Visma–Lease a Bike	(France) Valentine Fortin; Cofidis	(Italy) Barbara Guarischi; Team SD Worx–Protime	
(France) Pointe du Raz Ladies Classic	8 May 2025	1.1	(Spain) Paula Blasi; UAE Team ADQ	(United Kingdom) Lauren Dickson; Handsling Alba Development Road Team	(Netherlands) Anneke Dijkstra; VolkerWessels Cycling Team	
(France) La Classique Morbihan	9 May 2025	1.1	(Netherlands) Eline Jansen; VolkerWessels Cycling Team	(Netherlands) Amber Kraak; FDJ–Suez	(Italy) Giada Borghesi; Human Powered Health	
(France) Grand Prix du Morbihan Femmes	10 May 2025	1.1	(Italy) Eleonora Gasparrini; UAE Team ADQ	(Switzerland) Elise Chabbey; FDJ–Suez	(France) Ségolène Thomas; St. Michel–Preference Home–Auber93	
(Belgium) Trofee Maarten Wynants	11 May 2025	1.1	(Italy) Martina Fidanza; Visma–Lease a Bike	(Czech Republic) Tereza Neumanová; UAE Team ADQ	(Netherlands) Nienke Veenhoven; Visma–Lease a Bike	
(Netherlands) Omloop der Kempen Ladies	17 May 2025	1.1	(United Kingdom) April Tacey; Team Coop–Repsol	(Netherlands) Nienke Veenhoven; Visma–Lease a Bike	(France) Valentine Fortin; Cofidis	
(Spain) Durango Durango Emakumeen Saria	20 May 2025	1.1	(Canada) Isabella Holmgren; Lidl–Trek	(France) Évita Muzic; FDJ–Suez	(Netherlands) Thalita de Jong; Human Powered Health	
Ladies Tour of Estonia	31 May 2025	1.2	Karolina Kumięga; Poland (national team)	Malwina Mul; Poland (national team)	Heidi Antikainen; Finland (national team)	
(Belgium) Dwars door de Westhoek	8 June 2025	1.1	(Belgium) Fleur Moors; Lidl–Trek	(Norway) Susanne Andersen; Uno-X Mobility	(Denmark) Amalie Dideriksen; Cofidis	
(France) Alpes Gresivaudan Classic	8 June 2025	1.1	(Austria) Valentina Cavallar; Arkéa–B&B Hotels Women	(Belgium) Lotte Claes; Arkéa–B&B Hotels Women	(Canada) Nadia Gontova; Winspace Orange Seal	
(Belgium) GP Mazda Schelkens	9 June 2025	1.1	(France) Clara Copponi; Lidl–Trek	(Norway) Susanne Andersen; Uno-X Mobility	(Austria) Kathrin Schweinberger; Human Powered Health	
(Belgium) Dwars door het Hageland	14 June 2025	1.1	(Netherlands) Lorena Wiebes; Team SD Worx–Protime	(Belgium) Fleur Moors; Lidl–Trek	(United Kingdom) Millie Couzens; Fenix–Deceuninck	
(Italy) Giro dell'Appennino Donne Elite	24 June 2025	1.2	(Italy) Matilde Vitillo; Liv AlUla Jayco	(Italy) Irene Cagnazzo; BePink–Imatra–Bongioanni	(Italy) Gaia Segato; BePink–Imatra–Bongioanni	
(Belgium) Argenta Classic-2 Districtenpijl	6 July 2025	1.1	(Netherlands) Scarlett Souren; VolkerWessels Cycling Team	(United Kingdom) Millie Couzens; Fenix–Deceuninck	(Austria) Kathrin Schweinberger; Human Powered Health	
Respect Ladies Race Slovakia	12 July 2025	1.2	(Slovakia) Sofia Ungerová; MAT Atom Deweloper Wrocław	Olha Kulynych; Ukraine (national team)	(Poland) Malwina Mul; MAT Atom Deweloper Wrocław	
(Belgium) GP CHW Beveren	13 July 2025	1.2	(Belgium) Katrijn De Clercq; Lotto–Intermarché Ladies	(Netherlands) Anna van Wersch; Lotto–Intermarché Ladies	(Netherlands) Florien Bolks; WV Schijndel	
(France) La Périgord Ladies	19 July 2025	1.1	(Spain) Paula Blasi; UAE Team ADQ	(Netherlands) Karlijn Swinkels; UAE Team ADQ	(Belgium) Margot Vanpachtenbeke; VolkerWessels Cycling Team	
(France) La Picto - Charentaise	20 July 2025	1.1	(Poland) Dominika Włodarczyk; UAE Team ADQ	(Switzerland) Linda Zanetti; Uno-X Mobility	(Italy) Maria Giulia Confalonieri; Uno-X Mobility	
(Belgium) Grote Prijs Yvonne Reynders	15 August 2025	1.1	(Italy) Cristina Tonetti; Laboral Kutxa–Fundación Euskadi	(Trinidad and Tobago) Teniel Campbell; Smurfit Westrock Cycling Team	(Netherlands) Eline Jansen; VolkerWessels Cycling Team	
(Belgium) Egmont Cycling Race	19 August 2025	1.2	(Italy) Martina Alzini; Cofidis	(Netherlands) Lonneke Uneken; VolkerWessels Cycling Team	(Italy) Cristina Tonetti; Laboral Kutxa–Fundación Euskadi	
(Belgium) GP Lucien Van Impe	21 August 2025	1.1	(Netherlands) Lorena Wiebes; Team SD Worx–Protime	(Norway) Susanne Andersen; Uno-X Mobility	(Belgium) Shari Bossuyt; AG Insurance–Soudal	
(France) Kreiz Breizh Elites Féminin	28 August 2025	1.1	(Italy) Elisa Longo Borghini; UAE Team ADQ	(France) Margaux Vigié; Visma–Lease a Bike	(Norway) Susanne Andersen; Uno-X Mobility	
(United States) Maryland Cycling Classic Women	6 September 2025	1.1	(Poland) Agnieszka Skalniak-Sójka; Canyon//SRAM Zondacrypto	(Canada) Alison Jackson; EF Education–Oatly	(United States) Emma Langley; Aegis Cycling Foundation	
À travers les Hauts-de-France	13 September 2025	1.1	(Republic of Ireland) Lara Gillespie; UAE Team ADQ	(United Kingdom) Carys Lloyd; Movistar Team	(Netherlands) Eline Jansen; VolkerWessels Cycling Team	
(Belgium) Grand Prix de Wallonie féminin	17 September 2025	1.1	(Belgium) Shari Bossuyt; AG Insurance–Soudal	(Netherlands) Karlijn Swinkels; UAE Team ADQ	(Italy) Elisa Balsamo; Lidl–Trek	
(Canada) Chrono Féminin de Gatineau	19 September 2025	1.1	(Netherlands) Lieke Nooijen; Visma–Lease a Bike	(United States) Emily Ehrlich; Virginia's Blue Ridge–Twenty28	(France) Margaux Vigié; Visma–Lease a Bike	
(Canada) Tour de Gatineau	20 September 2025	1.1	(Netherlands) Nienke Veenhoven; Visma–Lease a Bike	(Italy) Martina Fidanza; Visma–Lease a Bike	(France) Margaux Vigié; Visma–Lease a Bike	
(France) Mirabelle Classic	27 September 2025	1.2	(Netherlands) Quinty Schoens; VolkerWessels Cycling Team	(Netherlands) Sabrina Stultiens; VolkerWessels Cycling Team	(Netherlands) Anne Knijnenburg; VolkerWessels Cycling Team	
(Belgium) Binche Chimay Binche pour Dames	7 October 2025	1.1	(Netherlands) Lorena Wiebes; Team SD Worx–Protime	(Republic of Ireland) Lara Gillespie; UAE Team Emirates XRG	(Italy) Maria Giulia Confalonieri; Uno-X Mobility	
(Spain) Vuelta Ciclista Andalucia Elite women	11 October 2025	1.1	(United Kingdom) Cat Ferguson; Movistar Team	(Spain) Usoa Ostolaza; Laboral Kutxa–Fundación Euskadi	(Netherlands) Mareille Meijering; Movistar Team	
(Belize) Caribbean Elite Road Cycling Championships ITT	11 October 2025	1.2	Teniel Campbell (TTO)	Llori Sharpe (JAM)	Gabriella Arnold (BER)	
(Belize) Caribbean Elite Road Cycling Championships ITT U23	11 October 2025	1.2	Lianis Mesa Silveira (CUB)	Kami Roach (BAH)	Sienna Mackey (BAH)	
(Italy) Trofeo Tessile & Moda Donne	12 October 2025	1.1	(Italy) Elisa Longo Borghini; UAE Team ADQ	(Switzerland) Marlen Reusser; Movistar Team	(Slovenia) Urška Žigart; AG Insurance–Soudal	
(Belize) Caribbean Elite Road Cycling Championships RR	12 October 2025	1.2	Teniel Campbell (TTO)	Gabriella Arnold (BER)	Evelyn Díaz Matos (CUB)	
(Belize) Caribbean Elite Road Cycling Championships RR U23	12 October 2025	1.2	Melsey Pérez Vega (DOM)	Flor Espiritusanto (DOM)	Lianis Mesa Silveira (CUB)	
(Italy) Giro del Veneto - Women	15 October 2025	1.1	(Italy) Silvia Persico; UAE Team ADQ	(Switzerland) Marlen Reusser; Movistar Team	(Italy) Eleonora Gasparrini; UAE Team ADQ	
(Guatemala) 2025 Central American Games	18 October 2025	1.2	(Costa Rica) Gloriana Quesada	(Guatemala) Gabriela Soto	(Costa Rica) Milagro Mena	
(France) Chrono des Nations	19 October 2025	1.1	(Netherlands) Ellen van Dijk; Lidl–Trek	(Italy) Alessia Vigilia; FDJ–Suez	(Austria) Christina Schweinberger; Fenix–Deceuninck	
(Guatemala) 2025 Central American Games	19 October 2025	1.2	(Panama) Wendy Ducreux	(Costa Rica) Gloriana Quesada	(Guatemala) Gabriela Soto	

== Stage races (2.1 and 2.2) ==
Race	Date	Cat. †	Winner	Second	Third	Ref
21–24 November 2024	Vuelta Femenina al Ecuador	1	Elizabeth Castaño; Colombia Potencia de la Vida–Strongman	Paula Carrasco; Colombia Potencia de la Vida–Strongman	Natalia Vásquez; Best PC Ecuador	
21–24 November 2024	Vuelta Femenina al Ecuador	2	(Ecuador) Esther Galarza; Eagle Bikes	(Ecuador) Elizabeth Bravo; Team Toscana	Paula Carrasco; Colombia Potencia de la Vida–Strongman	
21–24 November 2024	Vuelta Femenina al Ecuador	3	Natalia Vásquez; Best PC Ecuador	(Ecuador) Heidi Flores; Team Banco Guayaquil	(Ecuador) Esther Galarza; Eagle Bikes	
21–24 November 2024	Vuelta Femenina al Ecuador	4	(Ecuador) Esther Galarza; Eagle Bikes	Natalia Vásquez; Best PC Ecuador	(Ecuador) Heidi Flores; Team Banco Guayaquil	
21–24 November 2024	Vuelta Femenina al Ecuador	Overall	(Ecuador) Esther Galarza; Eagle Bikes; Winner	(Ecuador) Elizabeth Bravo; Team Toscana; 2nd place	(Ecuador) Heidi Flores; Team Banco Guayaquil; 3rd place	
6–8 March 2025	(Spain); Vuelta a Extremadura Femenina	1a	(Netherlands) Ellen van Dijk; Lidl–Trek	(Norway) Mie Bjørndal Ottestad; Uno-X Mobility	(Norway) Katrine Aalerud; Uno-X Mobility	
6–8 March 2025	(Spain); Vuelta a Extremadura Femenina	1b	(Italy) Greta Marturano; UAE Team ADQ	(Norway) Sigrid Ytterhus Haugset; Team Coop–Repsol	(United Kingdom) Carys Lloyd; Movistar Team	
6–8 March 2025	(Spain); Vuelta a Extremadura Femenina	2	(Norway) Mie Bjørndal Ottestad; Uno-X Mobility	(Netherlands) Ellen van Dijk; Lidl–Trek	(United Kingdom) Imogen Wolff; Visma–Lease a Bike	
6–8 March 2025	(Spain); Vuelta a Extremadura Femenina	3	(United Kingdom) Imogen Wolff; Visma–Lease a Bike	(Norway) Mie Bjørndal Ottestad; Uno-X Mobility	(Netherlands) Ellen van Dijk; Lidl–Trek	
6–8 March 2025	(Spain); Vuelta a Extremadura Femenina	Overall	(Netherlands) Ellen van Dijk; Lidl–Trek; Winner	(Norway) Mie Bjørndal Ottestad; Uno-X Mobility; 2nd place	(Italy) Greta Marturano; UAE Team ADQ; 3rd place	
7–11 March 2025	BIWASE Tour of Vietnam	1	Jutatip Maneephan; Thailand Women's Cycling Team	(Vietnam) Nguyễn Thị Thật; Công Ty CP Tập Đoàn Lộc Trời	(Japan) Kasuga Watabe; Phân Bón Con Voi Biwase	
7–11 March 2025	BIWASE Tour of Vietnam	2	Kamonrada Khaoplot; Thailand (national team)	(Australia) Cassia Boglio; Singapore Women's Academy	Valeriya Zakharkina; Tuyển Biwase - Bình Dương	
7–11 March 2025	BIWASE Tour of Vietnam	3	Natalia Frolova; Tuyển Biwase - Bình Dương	Valeriya Zakharkina; Tuyển Biwase - Bình Dương	(Australia) Cassia Boglio; Singapore Women's Academy	
7–11 March 2025	BIWASE Tour of Vietnam	4	Natalia Frolova; Tuyển Biwase - Bình Dương	(Australia) Cassia Boglio; Singapore Women's Academy	(Iran) Mandana Dehghan; Xổ Số Kiến Thiết Đồng	
7–11 March 2025	BIWASE Tour of Vietnam	5	Natalia Frolova; Tuyển Biwase - Bình Dương	(Australia) Cassia Boglio; Singapore Women's Academy	(Iran) Mandana Dehghan; Xổ Số Kiến Thiết Đồng	
7–11 March 2025	BIWASE Tour of Vietnam	Overall	Natalia Frolova; Tuyển Biwase - Bình Dương; Winner	(Australia) Cassia Boglio; Singapore Women's Academy; 2nd place	Valeriya Zakharkina; Tuyển Biwase - Bình Dương; 3rd place	
31 March – 2 April 2025	Women's Tour of Thailand	1	Jutatip Maneephan; Thailand Women's Cycling Team	Lee Sze Wing; Hong Kong (national team)	(China) Liu Jiali; Li Ning Star Ladies	
31 March – 2 April 2025	Women's Tour of Thailand	2	Jutatip Maneephan; Thailand Women's Cycling Team	Lee Sze Wing; Hong Kong (national team)	(South Korea) Jang Soo-ji; Sangju Cycling Team	
31 March – 2 April 2025	Women's Tour of Thailand	3	Jutatip Maneephan; Thailand Women's Cycling Team	(China) Liu Jiali; Li Ning Star Ladies	Lee Sze Wing; Hong Kong (national team)	
31 March – 2 April 2025	Women's Tour of Thailand	Overall	Jutatip Maneephan; Thailand Women's Cycling Team; Winner	Lee Sze Wing; Hong Kong (national team); 2nd place	(China) Liu Jiali; Li Ning Star Ladies; 3rd place	
2–6 April 2025	Tour El Salvador	Prologue	Tamara Dronova; Roland	(Switzerland) Elena Hartmann; Ceratizit Pro Cycling	(Spain) Sandra Alonso; Ceratizit Pro Cycling	
2–6 April 2025	Tour El Salvador	1	(Spain) Usoa Ostolaza; Laboral Kutxa–Fundación Euskadi	(Switzerland) Elena Hartmann; Ceratizit Pro Cycling	(Uzbekistan) Yanina Kuskova; Laboral Kutxa–Fundación Euskadi	
2–6 April 2025	Tour El Salvador	2	(Republic of Ireland) Mia Griffin; Roland	(Italy) Laura Tomasi; Laboral Kutxa–Fundación Euskadi	(Italy) Arianna Fidanza; Laboral Kutxa–Fundación Euskadi	
2–6 April 2025	Tour El Salvador	3	(Italy) Sara Fiorin; Ceratizit Pro Cycling	(Italy) Laura Tomasi; Laboral Kutxa–Fundación Euskadi	Tamara Dronova; Roland	
2–6 April 2025	Tour El Salvador	4	(Spain) Usoa Ostolaza; Laboral Kutxa–Fundación Euskadi	Tamara Dronova; Roland	(Italy) Arianna Fidanza; Laboral Kutxa–Fundación Euskadi	
2–6 April 2025	Tour El Salvador	Overall	(Switzerland) Elena Hartmann; Ceratizit Pro Cycling; Winner	(Spain) Usoa Ostolaza; Laboral Kutxa–Fundación Euskadi; 2nd place	(Uzbekistan) Yanina Kuskova; Laboral Kutxa–Fundación Euskadi; 3rd place	
23–27 April 2025	(United States); Tour of the Gila	1	(United States) Lauren Stephens; Aegis Cycling Mixed Team	(Canada) Sidney Swierenga; TaG Cycling	(Colombia) Lorena Villamizar; Pato Bike BMC Team	
23–27 April 2025	(United States); Tour of the Gila	2	(United States) Lauren Stephens; Aegis Cycling Mixed Team	(United States) Emma Langley; Aegis Cycling Mixed Team	(Canada) Sidney Swierenga; TaG Cycling	
23–27 April 2025	(United States); Tour of the Gila	3	(United States) Lauren Stephens; Aegis Cycling Mixed Team	(United States) Minori Minagawa; Fount Cycling Guild	(United States) Emma Langley; Aegis Cycling Mixed Team	
23–27 April 2025	(United States); Tour of the Gila	4	(United States) Galen Bolard; Competitive Edge Racing	(United States) Lauren Stephens; Aegis Cycling Mixed Team	(United States) Minori Minagawa; Fount Cycling Guild	
23–27 April 2025	(United States); Tour of the Gila	5	(United Kingdom) Frankie Hall; Aegis Cycling Mixed Team	(United States) Lauren Stephens; Aegis Cycling Mixed Team	(United States) Emma Langley; Aegis Cycling Mixed Team	
23–27 April 2025	(United States); Tour of the Gila	Overall	(United States) Lauren Stephens; Aegis Cycling Mixed Team; Winner	(Canada) Sidney Swierenga; TaG Cycling; 2nd place	(United States) Emma Langley; Aegis Cycling Mixed Team; 3rd place	
28–30 April 2025	(Uzbekistan); Tour of Bostonliq Ladies	1	Akpeiil Ossim; Kazakhstan (national team)	Faina Potapova; Kazakhstan (national team)	(Turkey) Neyran Elden; Akut Sportsn Female Cycling Team	
28–30 April 2025	(Uzbekistan); Tour of Bostonliq Ladies	2	Madina Kakhkhorova; Uzbekistan (national team)	Nesrine Houili; Algeria (national team)	Akpeiil Ossim; Kazakhstan (national team)	
28–30 April 2025	(Uzbekistan); Tour of Bostonliq Ladies	3	Shakhnoza Abdullaeva; Uzbekistan (national team)	Madina Kakhkhorova; Uzbekistan (national team)	Nesrine Houili; Algeria (national team)	
28–30 April 2025	(Uzbekistan); Tour of Bostonliq Ladies	Overall	Shakhnoza Abdullaeva; Uzbekistan (national team); Winner	Akpeiil Ossim; Kazakhstan (national team); 2nd place	Nesrine Houili; Algeria (national team); 3rd place	
1–4 May 2025	(Czech Republic); Gracia–Orlová	1	Marieke Meert; Belgium (national team)	(Poland) Malwina Mul; MAT Atom Deweloper Wrocław	Caroline Andersson; Sweden (national team)	
1–4 May 2025	(Czech Republic); Gracia–Orlová	2	(Canada) Alison Jackson; EF Education–Oatly	Marieke Meert; Belgium (national team)	Caroline Andersson; Sweden (national team)	
1–4 May 2025	(Czech Republic); Gracia–Orlová	3	(Switzerland) Jasmin Liechti; NEXETIS	(Poland) Karolina Kumięga; KDM - Pack Cycling Team vzw	(Denmark) Christina Bragh; Team Friis ABC ACR	
1–4 May 2025	(Czech Republic); Gracia–Orlová	4	Marion Norbert-Riberolle; Belgium (national team)	(Canada) Alexandra Volstad; EF Education–Oatly	(Netherlands) Florien Bolks; WV Schijndel	
1–4 May 2025	(Czech Republic); Gracia–Orlová	5	(Denmark) Christina Bragh; Team Friis ABC ACR	(Netherlands) Noor Dekker; WV Breda	(Canada) Alison Jackson; EF Education–Oatly	
1–4 May 2025	(Czech Republic); Gracia–Orlová	Overall	(Canada) Alison Jackson; EF Education–Oatly; Winner	(Switzerland) Jasmin Liechti; NEXETIS; 2nd place	(Poland) Karolina Kumięga; KDM - Pack Cycling Team vzw 3rd place	
2–6 May 2025	(United States); Tour de Bloom	1	(United States) Lauren Stephens; Aegis Cycling Mixed Team	(United States) Alia Shafi; Fount Cycling Guild	(Cuba) Marlies Mejías; Virginia's Blue Ridge–Twenty28	
2–6 May 2025	(United States); Tour de Bloom	2	(United States) Alia Shafi; Fount Cycling Guild	(Cuba) Marlies Mejías; Virginia's Blue Ridge–Twenty28	(United States) Lauren Stephens; Aegis Cycling Mixed Team	
2–6 May 2025	(United States); Tour de Bloom	3	(United States) Lauren Stephens; Aegis Cycling Mixed Team	(United States) Alia Shafi; Fount Cycling Guild	(Spain) Paula Gil Echevarria; Valkyr Cycling Team	
2–6 May 2025	(United States); Tour de Bloom	4	(United States) Emily Ehrlich; Virginia's Blue Ridge–Twenty28	(United States) Lauren Stephens; Aegis Cycling Mixed Team	(Cuba) Marlies Mejías; Virginia's Blue Ridge–Twenty28	
2–6 May 2025	(United States); Tour de Bloom	5	(United States) Lauren Stephens; Aegis Cycling Mixed Team	(Spain) Paula Gil Echevarria; Valkyr Cycling Team	(United Kingdom) Frankie Hall; Aegis Cycling Mixed Team	
2–6 May 2025	(United States); Tour de Bloom	Overall	(United States) Lauren Stephens; Aegis Cycling Mixed Team; Winner	(United States) Alia Shafi; Fount Cycling Guild; 2nd place	(Spain) Paula Gil Echevarria; Valkyr Cycling Team; 3rd place	
15–18 May 2025	(Czech Republic); Tour de Feminin	1	Belgium (national team); Tess Moerman; Luca Vierstraete; Xaydée Van Sinaey; Marion Norbert-Riberolle; Billy Goossens; Alicia Franck	MAT Atom Deweloper Wrocław; Olga Wankiewicz; Malwina Mul; Sofia Ungerová; Martyna Szczęsna; Maja Tracka; Alicja Matuła	KDM - Pack Cycling Team vzw Léa Stern; Karolina Kumięga; Anabelle Thomas; Laury Milette; Nicole Frain; Lea Waldhoff	
15–18 May 2025	(Czech Republic); Tour de Feminin	2	(Canada) Anabelle Thomas; KDM - Pack Cycling Team vzw	(Poland) Malwina Mul; MAT Atom Deweloper Wrocław	(Italy) Chiara Reghini; Top Girls Fassa Bortolo	
15–18 May 2025	(Czech Republic); Tour de Feminin	3	(United Kingdom) Robyn Clay; DAS–Hutchinson	(United Kingdom) Kate Richardson; Handsling Alba Development Road Team	(Canada) Émilie Fortin; O'Shea Redchilli Bikes	
15–18 May 2025	(Czech Republic); Tour de Feminin	4	(Netherlands) Lente Boskamp; VELOPRO - Alphamotorhomes	(Poland) Malwina Mul; MAT Atom Deweloper Wrocław	(Canada) Anabelle Thomas; KDM - Pack Cycling Team vzw	
15–18 May 2025	(Czech Republic); Tour de Feminin	Overall	(United Kingdom) Kate Richardson; Handsling Alba Development Road Team; Winner	(Poland) Malwina Mul; MAT Atom Deweloper Wrocław; 2nd place	Xaydée Van Sinaey; Belgium (national team); 3rd place	
31 May – 1 June 2025	Tour of Norway Women	1	(Belgium) Justine Ghekiere; AG Insurance–Soudal	(United Kingdom) Lauren Dickson; Handsling Alba Development Road Team	(Australia) Sarah Gigante; AG Insurance–Soudal	
31 May – 1 June 2025	Tour of Norway Women	2	(Norway) Mie Bjørndal Ottestad; Uno-X Mobility	(Norway) Susanne Andersen; Uno-X Mobility	(Belgium) Margot Vanpachtenbeke; VolkerWessels Cycling Team	
31 May – 1 June 2025	Tour of Norway Women	Overall	(Norway) Mie Bjørndal Ottestad; Uno-X Mobility; Winner	(Belgium) Justine Ghekiere; AG Insurance–Soudal; 2nd place	(United Kingdom) Lauren Dickson; Handsling Alba Development Road Team; 3rd place	
6–8 June 2025	(Spain); Volta Ciclista a Catalunya Femenina	1	(Switzerland) Elise Chabbey; FDJ–Suez	(Netherlands) Demi Vollering; FDJ–Suez	(Spain) Ane Santesteban; Laboral Kutxa–Fundación Euskadi	
6–8 June 2025	(Spain); Volta Ciclista a Catalunya Femenina	2	(Netherlands) Demi Vollering; FDJ–Suez	(France) Marion Bunel; Visma–Lease a Bike	(Netherlands) Femke de Vries; Visma–Lease a Bike	
6–8 June 2025	(Spain); Volta Ciclista a Catalunya Femenina	3	(Netherlands) Loes Adegeest; FDJ–Suez	(Netherlands) Eva van Agt; Visma–Lease a Bike	(Netherlands) Eline Jansen; VolkerWessels Cycling Team	
6–8 June 2025	(Spain); Volta Ciclista a Catalunya Femenina	Overall	(Netherlands) Demi Vollering; FDJ–Suez; Winner	(Switzerland) Elise Chabbey; FDJ–Suez; 2nd place	(France) Marion Bunel; Visma–Lease a Bike; 3rd place	
10–15 June 2025	Vuelta a Colombia Femenina	1	(Colombia) Diana Peñuela; Team Sistecredito	(Colombia) Lina Hernández; Mujeres Ant-Org Paisa	(Colombia) Karen González; LC Pro Cycling	
10–15 June 2025	Vuelta a Colombia Femenina	2	(Mexico) Andrea Ramírez; Pato Bike BMC Team	(Colombia) María Latriglia; Team Sistecredito	(Colombia) Diana Peñuela; Team Sistecredito	
10–15 June 2025	Vuelta a Colombia Femenina	3	(Colombia) Diana Peñuela; Team Sistecredito	(Colombia) María Latriglia; Team Sistecredito	(Colombia) Lina Hernández; Mujeres Ant-Org Paisa	
10–15 June 2025	Vuelta a Colombia Femenina	4	(Colombia) Natalia Garzón; Team Sistecredito	(Colombia) Stefania Sánchez; Team Sistecredito	(Colombia) Jessenia Meneses; Mujeres Ant-Org Paisa	
10–15 June 2025	Vuelta a Colombia Femenina	5	(Colombia) Diana Peñuela; Team Sistecredito	(Colombia) Natalia Garzón; Team Sistecredito	(Colombia) Jessenia Meneses; Mujeres Ant-Org Paisa	
10–15 June 2025	Vuelta a Colombia Femenina	6	(Colombia) Diana Peñuela; Team Sistecredito	(Colombia) Lorena Villamizar; Pato Bike BMC Team	(Colombia) Jennifer Sánchez; Ciclismo Capital	
10–15 June 2025	Vuelta a Colombia Femenina	Overall	(Colombia) Diana Peñuela; Team Sistecredito; Winner	(Colombia) Jessenia Meneses; Mujeres Ant-Org Paisa; 2nd place	(Colombia) Stefania Sánchez; Team Sistecredito; 3rd place	
13–15 June 2025	(France); Tour Féminin International des Pyrénées	1	(New Zealand) Ally Wollaston; FDJ–Suez	(Netherlands) Eline Jansen; VolkerWessels Cycling Team	(Belgium) Margot Vanpachtenbeke; VolkerWessels Cycling Team	
13–15 June 2025	(France); Tour Féminin International des Pyrénées	2	(Spain) Usoa Ostolaza; Laboral Kutxa–Fundación Euskadi	(Canada) Nadia Gontova; Winspace Orange Seal	(France) Ségolène Thomas; St. Michel–Preference Home–Auber93	
13–15 June 2025	(France); Tour Féminin International des Pyrénées	3	(Australia) Brodie Chapman; UAE Team ADQ	(Spain) Usoa Ostolaza; Laboral Kutxa–Fundación Euskadi	(Poland) Dominika Włodarczyk; UAE Team ADQ	
13–15 June 2025	(France); Tour Féminin International des Pyrénées	Overall	(Spain) Usoa Ostolaza; Laboral Kutxa–Fundación Euskadi; Winner	(Canada) Nadia Gontova; Winspace Orange Seal; 2nd place	(Austria) Valentina Cavallar; Arkéa–B&B Hotels Women; 3rd place	
2–6 July 2025	Volta a Portugal Feminina	1	(Denmark) Amalie Dideriksen; Cofidis	(New Zealand) Michaela Drummond; Arkéa–B&B Hotels Women	(Spain) Eva Anguela; Cantabria Deporte - Rio Miera	
2–6 July 2025	Volta a Portugal Feminina	2	(United States) Heidi Franz; Cynisca Cycling	(Sweden) Emilia Fahlin; Arkéa–B&B Hotels Women	(Japan) Tsuyaka Uchino; NEXETIS	
2–6 July 2025	Volta a Portugal Feminina	3	(Republic of Ireland) Fiona Mangan; Winspace Orange Seal	(United States) Alexis Ryan; Cynisca Cycling	(New Zealand) Michaela Drummond; Arkéa–B&B Hotels Women	
2–6 July 2025	Volta a Portugal Feminina	4	(Switzerland) Jasmin Liechti; NEXETIS	(Denmark) Amalie Dideriksen; Cofidis	(Canada) Kiara Lylyk; Winspace Orange Seal	
2–6 July 2025	Volta a Portugal Feminina	5	(France) India Grangier; Team Coop–Repsol	(France) Océane Mahé; Arkéa–B&B Hotels Women	(Canada) Kiara Lylyk; Winspace Orange Seal	
2–6 July 2025	Volta a Portugal Feminina	Overall	(Switzerland) Jasmin Liechti; NEXETIS; Winner	(France) India Grangier; Team Coop–Repsol; 2nd place	(United States) Heidi Franz; Cynisca Cycling; 3rd place	
16–20 July 2025	(Belgium); Baloise Ladies Tour	Prologue	(United Kingdom) Zoe Bäckstedt; Canyon//SRAM Zondacrypto	(Netherlands) Ellen van Dijk; Lidl–Trek	(Netherlands) Charlotte Kool; Team Picnic–PostNL	
16–20 July 2025	(Belgium); Baloise Ladies Tour	1	(Netherlands) Charlotte Kool; Team Picnic–PostNL	(Italy) Chiara Consonni; Canyon//SRAM Zondacrypto	(Netherlands) Nienke Veenhoven; Visma–Lease a Bike	
16–20 July 2025	(Belgium); Baloise Ladies Tour	2	(Netherlands) Nienke Veenhoven; Visma–Lease a Bike	(Italy) Barbara Guarischi; Team SD Worx–Protime	(Poland) Karolina Kumięga; KDM - Pack Cycling Team vzw	
16–20 July 2025	(Belgium); Baloise Ladies Tour	3a	(United Kingdom) Zoe Bäckstedt; Canyon//SRAM Zondacrypto	(Luxembourg) Marie Schreiber; Team SD Worx–Protime	(Italy) Barbara Guarischi; Team SD Worx–Protime	
16–20 July 2025	(Belgium); Baloise Ladies Tour	3b	(United Kingdom) Zoe Bäckstedt; Canyon//SRAM Zondacrypto	(Netherlands) Ellen van Dijk; Lidl–Trek	(Belgium) Marthe Goossens; AG Insurance–Soudal	
16–20 July 2025	(Belgium); Baloise Ladies Tour	4	(Italy) Martina Fidanza; Visma–Lease a Bike	(Italy) Barbara Guarischi; Team SD Worx–Protime	(Italy) Chiara Consonni; Canyon//SRAM Zondacrypto	
16–20 July 2025	(Belgium); Baloise Ladies Tour	Overall	(United Kingdom) Zoe Bäckstedt; Canyon//SRAM Zondacrypto; Winner	(Netherlands) Ellen van Dijk; Lidl–Trek; 2nd place	(Belgium) Marthe Goossens; AG Insurance–Soudal; 3rd place	
31 July – 3 August 2025	(Namibia); Windhoek Women Tour	1	(Ethiopia) Hadush Merhawit Asgodom; Team Amani	(Ethiopia) Serkalen Taye Watango; Team Amani	(Mauritius) Lucie de Marigny-Lagesse; Mautitius (national team)	
31 July – 3 August 2025	(Namibia); Windhoek Women Tour	2	(Mauritius) Lucie de Marigny-Lagesse; Mautitius (national team)	(Rwanda) Xaverine Nirere; Team Amani	(Mauritius) Eléonore Saraiva; Mautitius (national team)	
31 July – 3 August 2025	(Namibia); Windhoek Women Tour	3	(Rwanda) Xaverine Nirere; Team Amani	(Ethiopia) Hadush Merhawit Asgodom; Team Amani	(Ethiopia) Serkalen Taye Watango; Team Amani	
31 July – 3 August 2025	(Namibia); Windhoek Women Tour	4	(South Africa) Taneal Otto; Cycle Nation Enza Construction	(South Africa) Lisa Bone; Cycle Nation Enza Construction	(Namibia) Delsia Janse van Vuuren; Pinkt Customized Cycling	
31 July – 3 August 2025	(Namibia); Windhoek Women Tour	Overall	(Rwanda) Xaverine Nirere; Team Amani; Winner	(Ethiopia) Hadush Merhawit Asgodom; Team Amani; 2nd place	(Ethiopia) Serkalen Taye Watango; Team Amani; 3rd place	
12–14 August 2025	(Poland); Tour de Pologne Women	1	(Italy) Chiara Consonni; Canyon//SRAM Zondacrypto	(France) Clara Copponi; Lidl–Trek	(Austria) Kathrin Schweinberger; Human Powered Health	
12–14 August 2025	(Poland); Tour de Pologne Women	2	(Switzerland) Linda Zanetti; Uno-X Mobility	(France) Marie Le Net; FDJ–Suez	(Italy) Sofia Bertizzolo; UAE Team ADQ	
12–14 August 2025	(Poland); Tour de Pologne Women	3	(Italy) Chiara Consonni; Canyon//SRAM Zondacrypto	(Switzerland) Linda Zanetti; Uno-X Mobility	(Denmark) Emma Norsgaard; Lidl–Trek	
12–14 August 2025	(Poland); Tour de Pologne Women	Overall	(Italy) Chiara Consonni; Canyon//SRAM Zondacrypto; Winner	(Switzerland) Linda Zanetti; Uno-X Mobility; 2nd place	(Austria) Kathrin Schweinberger; Human Powered Health; 3rd place	
14–17 August 2025	Vuelta Femenina a Guatemala	1	(Colombia) Lorena Villamizar; Pato Bike BMC Team	(Colombia) Camila Valbuena; Team Macizo - Banrural	(Guatemala) Gabriela Soto; Team Macizo - Banrural	
14–17 August 2025	Vuelta Femenina a Guatemala	2	(Colombia) Natalia Muñoz; Pato Bike BMC Team	(Colombia) Lorena Villamizar; Pato Bike BMC Team	(Colombia) Camila Valbuena; Team Macizo - Banrural	
14–17 August 2025	Vuelta Femenina a Guatemala	3	(Colombia) Milena Salcedo; Pato Bike BMC Team	(Colombia) Jessica Parra; Pato Bike BMC Team	(Ecuador) Miryam Núñez; Team Macizo - Banrural	
14–17 August 2025	Vuelta Femenina a Guatemala	4	(Colombia) Camila Valbuena; Team Macizo - Banrural	(Colombia) Jessica Parra; Pato Bike BMC Team	(Guatemala) Gabriela Soto; Team Macizo - Banrural	
14–17 August 2025	Vuelta Femenina a Guatemala	Overall	(Colombia) Jessica Parra; Pato Bike BMC Team; Winner	(Colombia) Camila Valbuena; Team Macizo - Banrural; 2nd place	(Colombia) Lorena Villamizar; Pato Bike BMC Team; 3rd place	
23–29 August 2025	(France); Tour de l'Avenir Femmes	Prologue	Isabella Holmgren; Canada (national team)	Eleonora Ciabocco; Italy (national team)	Talia Appleton; Australia (national team)	
23–29 August 2025	(France); Tour de l'Avenir Femmes	1	Célia Gery; France (national team)	Eleonora Ciabocco; Italy (national team)	Fleur Moors; Belgium (national team)	
23–29 August 2025	(France); Tour de l'Avenir Femmes	2	Scarlett Souren; Netherlands (national team)	Federica Venturelli; Italy (national team)	Marie Schreiber; Luxembourg (national team)	
23–29 August 2025	(France); Tour de l'Avenir Femmes	3	Célia Gery; France (national team)	Linda Riedmann; Germany (national team)	Fleur Moors; Belgium (national team)	
23–29 August 2025	(France); Tour de l'Avenir Femmes	4	Célia Gery; France (national team)	Fleur Moors; Belgium (national team)	(United Kingdom) Millie Couzens; Great Britain (national team)	
23–29 August 2025	(France); Tour de l'Avenir Femmes	5a	Isabella Holmgren; Canada (national team)	Marion Bunel; France (national team)	Talia Appleton; Australia (national team)	
23–29 August 2025	(France); Tour de l'Avenir Femmes	5b	Isabella Holmgren; Canada (national team)	Talia Appleton; Australia (national team)	Marion Bunel; France (national team)	
23–29 August 2025	(France); Tour de l'Avenir Femmes	Overall	Isabella Holmgren; Canada (national team); Winner	Marion Bunel; France (national team); 2nd place	Talia Appleton; Australia (national team); 3rd place	
4–7 September 2025	(Italy); Giro della Toscana Int. Femminile – Memorial Michela Fanini	1	(Australia) Liv AlUla Jayco Women's Continental Team; Mackenzie Coupland; Leila Gschwentner; Noä Jansen; Emma Jeffers; Matilde Vitillo; Erin Boothman	(United Arab Emirates) UAE Development Team; Alena Amialiusik; Fee Knaven; Hannah Kunz; Francesca Pellegrini; Eilidh Shaw	(Poland) Toruński Klub Kolarski Pacific - Nestlé Fitness Cycling Team; Natalia Krześlak; Nikol Płosaj; Zuzanna Chylińska; Emilia Staniek; Patrycja Lorkowska; Karolina Kumięga	
4–7 September 2025	(Italy); Giro della Toscana Int. Femminile – Memorial Michela Fanini	2	(Republic of Ireland) Emma Jeffers; Liv AlUla Jayco Women's Continental Team	(Belgium) Anna Vanderaerden; Fenix–Deceuninck Development Team	(Switzerland) Jasmin Liechti; NEXETIS	
4–7 September 2025	(Italy); Giro della Toscana Int. Femminile – Memorial Michela Fanini	3	(Netherlands) Eline Jansen; VolkerWessels Cycling Team	(Switzerland) Jasmin Liechti; NEXETIS	(Belgium) Xaydée Van Sinaey; Fenix–Premier Tech Development Team	
4–7 September 2025	(Italy); Giro della Toscana Int. Femminile – Memorial Michela Fanini	4	(Netherlands) Eline Jansen; VolkerWessels Cycling Team	Alena Amialiusik; UAE Development Team	(Belgium) Xaydée Van Sinaey; Fenix–Premier Tech Development Team	
4–7 September 2025	(Italy); Giro della Toscana Int. Femminile – Memorial Michela Fanini	Overall	(Netherlands) Eline Jansen; VolkerWessels Cycling Team; Winner	Alena Amialiusik; UAE Development Team; 2nd place	(Belgium) Xaydée Van Sinaey; Fenix–Premier Tech Development Team; 3rd place	
9–14 September 2025	(France); Tour Cycliste Féminin International de l'Ardèche	1	(Belgium) Lotte Kopecky; Team SD Worx–Protime	(Italy) Eleonora Ciabocco; Team Picnic–PostNL	(Netherlands) Mischa Bredewold; Team SD Worx–Protime	
9–14 September 2025	(France); Tour Cycliste Féminin International de l'Ardèche	2	This stage was cancelled due to a strike among the local law enforcement.			
9–14 September 2025	(France); Tour Cycliste Féminin International de l'Ardèche	3	(Netherlands) Mischa Bredewold; Team SD Worx–Protime	(Netherlands) Amber Kraak; FDJ–Suez	(Poland) Marta Lach; Team SD Worx–Protime	
9–14 September 2025	(France); Tour Cycliste Féminin International de l'Ardèche	4	(Netherlands) Mischa Bredewold; Team SD Worx–Protime	(France) Maëva Squiban; UAE Team ADQ	(Italy) Monica Trinca Colonel; Liv AlUla Jayco	
9–14 September 2025	(France); Tour Cycliste Féminin International de l'Ardèche	5	(France) Marion Bunel; Visma–Lease a Bike	(Netherlands) Femke de Vries; Visma–Lease a Bike	(Italy) Monica Trinca Colonel; Liv AlUla Jayco	
9–14 September 2025	(France); Tour Cycliste Féminin International de l'Ardèche	6	(Italy) Monica Trinca Colonel; Liv AlUla Jayco	(France) Évita Muzic; FDJ–Suez	(France) Maëva Squiban; UAE Team ADQ	
9–14 September 2025	(France); Tour Cycliste Féminin International de l'Ardèche	Overall	(Italy) Monica Trinca Colonel; Liv AlUla Jayco; Winner	(Netherlands) Femke de Vries; Visma–Lease a Bike; 2nd place	(France) Maëva Squiban; UAE Team ADQ; 3rd place	
19–21 September 2025	(Italy); Giro Mediterraneo Rosa	1	(United Kingdom) Francesca Hall; Team Buffaz Gestion de Patrimoine	(Italy) Matilde Vitillo; Liv AlUla Jayco Women's Continental Team	(San Marino) Valentina Venerucci; Aromitalia 3T Vaiano	
19–21 September 2025	(Italy); Giro Mediterraneo Rosa	2	(Republic of Ireland) Emma Jeffers; Liv AlUla Jayco Women's Continental Team	(Italy) Irma Siri; Top Girls Fassa Bortolo	(Netherlands) Meike Uiterwijk Winkel; BePink–Imatra–Bongioanni	
19–21 September 2025	(Italy); Giro Mediterraneo Rosa	3	Hanna Tserakh; Aromitalia 3T Vaiano	(Republic of Ireland) Emma Jeffers; Liv AlUla Jayco Women's Continental Team	(Italy) Anita Baima	
19–21 September 2025	(Italy); Giro Mediterraneo Rosa	Overall	(Italy) Matilde Vitillo; Liv AlUla Jayco Women's Continental Team; Winner	(United Kingdom) Francesca Hall; Team Buffaz Gestion de Patrimoine; 2nd place	(San Marino) Valentina Venerucci; Aromitalia 3T Vaiano; 3rd place	
1–5 October 2025	Vuelta Internacional Femenina a Costa Rica	1	(Colombia) Milena Salcedo; Pato Bike BMC Team	(Colombia) Karen Villamizar; Pato Bike BMC Team	(Costa Rica) Dixiana Quesada; Colono Bikestation Kölbi	
1–5 October 2025	Vuelta Internacional Femenina a Costa Rica	2	(Colombia) Milena Salcedo; Pato Bike BMC Team	(Colombia) Karen Villamizar; Pato Bike BMC Team	(Ecuador) Michela Molina; Manzaté La Selva Scott	
1–5 October 2025	Vuelta Internacional Femenina a Costa Rica	3	(Ukraine) Nataliia Safroniuk; Pato Bike BMC Team	(Mexico) Ana María Hernández; Fast & Up - Bikecafé	(United States) Anna Dorovskikh; Orion Racing	
1–5 October 2025	Vuelta Internacional Femenina a Costa Rica	4	(Colombia) Camila Valbuena; Manzaté La Selva Scott	(Mexico) Andrea Ramírez; Pato Bike BMC Team	(Colombia) Karen Villamizar; Pato Bike BMC Team	
1–5 October 2025	Vuelta Internacional Femenina a Costa Rica	5	(Colombia) Jessica Parra; Pato Bike BMC Team	(Mexico) Andrea Ramírez; Pato Bike BMC Team	(Colombia) Karen Villamizar; Pato Bike BMC Team	
1–5 October 2025	Vuelta Internacional Femenina a Costa Rica	Overall	(Colombia) Camila Valbuena; Manzaté La Selva Scott; Winner	(Mexico) Andrea Ramírez; Pato Bike BMC Team; 2nd place	(Colombia) Karen Villamizar; Pato Bike BMC Team; 3rd place	
