= 2026 Holland Ladies Tour =

2026 Eneco Tour Women
2026 UCI women's road

Race details
- Dates: 13–18 October 2026
- Stages: 5 + Prologue
- Distance: 376.5 km (233.9 mi)
- Winning time: 9h 10' 08"

Results
Jersey awarded to the overall winner	Winner	Lieke Nooijen (NED)	(Visma–Lease a Bike)
	Second	Femke Markus (NED)	(Team SD Worx–Protime)
	Third	Letizia Borghesi (ITA)	(AG Insurance–Soudal)
Jersey awarded to the points classification winner	Points	Lieke Nooijen (NED)	(Visma–Lease a Bike)
Jersey awarded to the young rider classification winner	Young rider	Nienke Vinke (NED)	(Team SD Worx–Protime)
	Team	(Netherlands) VolkerWessels Women Cyclingteam	

The 2026 Holland Ladies Tour (officially 2026 Eneco Tour Women for sponsorship reasons) is a women's road cycling stage race which takes place from 13 to 18 October 2026 in the Netherlands. It is the 28th edition of the Holland Ladies Tour, and the 1st under its current guise as Eneco Tour Women. The race is rated as a 2.1 event on the 2026 UCI women's road calendar, after being a UCI Women's World Tour race in previous editions.

For the first time, the race were integrated with the men's Tour of Holland, sharing the same routes on the same dates.

== Teams ==
Six UCI Women WorldTeams, two UCI Women ProTeams, four UCI Women Continental teams, and three club teams made up the fifteen teams that participated in the race.

UCI Women WorldTeams

- AG Insurance–Soudal
- Fenix–Premier Tech
- Liv AlUla Jayco
- Team Picnic–PostNL
- Team SD Worx–Protime
- Visma–Lease a Bike

UCI Women ProTeams

- Lotto–Intermarché Ladies
- VolkerWessels Women Cyclingteam

UCI Women Continental Teams

- Citymesh–Customm Pro Cycling Team
- Hitec Products–Fluid Control
- O'Shea Redchilli Bikes
- Vini Fantini–BePink

Club Teams

- Carbonbike – Giordana
- Regioteam Midden-Nederland
- WV Schijndel Women U23

== Schedule ==
Stage characteristics and winners
Stage	Date	Route	Distance	Type	Stage winner
P	13 October	The Hague to The Hague	3.1 km (1.9 mi)	Individual time trial	Lieke Nooijen (NED)
1	14 October	Ede to Ede	79.5 km (49.4 mi)	Flat stage	Sandrine Tas (BEL)
2	15 October	Tilburg to Tilburg	13.6 km (8.5 mi)	Individual time trial	Lieke Nooijen (NED)
3	16 October	Sittard to Watersley	87.8 km (54.6 mi)	Hilly stage	Femke Markus (NED)
4	17 October	Hoogeveen to Vamberg	114.3 km (71.0 mi)	Hilly stage	Letizia Borghesi (ITA)
5	18 October	Arnhem to Arnhem	78.2 km (48.6 mi)	Flat stage	Marthe Truyen (BEL)
Total			376.5 km (233.9 mi)		

== Stages ==
=== Prologue ===
For the first time in the race history, men and women will race at the same time on the route. It was planned that every men and women competitor starting alternately in 5 minute interval, however after the plan was blocked by UCI due to insurance issues, it was changed to 30 men and 30 women competitors starting alternately.

13 October 2026 – The Hague to The Hague, 3.1 km (1.9 mi) (ITT)

Prologue Result
Rank	Rider	Team	Time
1	Lieke Nooijen (NED)	Visma–Lease a Bike	3' 51.72"
2	Charlotte Kool (NED)	Fenix–Premier Tech	+ 8.21"
3	Lonneke Uneken (NED)	VolkerWessels Women Cyclingteam	+ 8.22"
4	Sandrine Tas (BEL)	Lotto–Intermarché Ladies	+ 8.79"
5	Maud Rijnbeek (NED)	VolkerWessels Women Cyclingteam	+ 10.22"
6	Anneke Dijkstra (NED)	VolkerWessels Women Cyclingteam	+ 10.24"
7	Nienke Vinke (NED)	Team SD Worx–Protime	+ 10.90"
8	Letizia Borghesi (ITA)	AG Insurance–Soudal	+ 11.76"
9	Femke Markus (NED)	Team SD Worx–Protime	+ 11.79"
10	Margaux Vigie (FRA)	Visma–Lease a Bike	+ 11.87"

General classification after prologue
Rank	Rider	Team	Time
1	Lieke Nooijen (NED)	Visma–Lease a Bike	3' 51"
2	Charlotte Kool (NED)	Fenix–Premier Tech	+ 8"
3	Lonneke Uneken (NED)	VolkerWessels Women Cyclingteam	+ 8"
4	Sandrine Tas (BEL)	Lotto–Intermarché Ladies	+ 9"
5	Maud Rijnbeek (NED)	VolkerWessels Women Cyclingteam	+ 10"
6	Anneke Dijkstra (NED)	VolkerWessels Women Cyclingteam	+ 10"
7	Nienke Vinke (NED)	Team SD Worx–Protime	+ 11"
8	Letizia Borghesi (ITA)	AG Insurance–Soudal	+ 12"
9	Femke Markus (NED)	Team SD Worx–Protime	+ 12"
10	Margaux Vigie (FRA)	Visma–Lease a Bike	+ 12"

=== Stage 1 ===
In the original result, Barbara Guarischi from Team SD Worx–Protime finished third in the sprint finish. But after commissaires review, she was relegated to 85th place, fined CHF 100 and deducted 7 points in the points classification, after deemed to impede Charlotte Kool in her sprint.

14 October 2026 – Ede to Ede, 79.5 km (49.4 mi)

Stage 1 Result
Rank	Rider	Team	Time
1	Sandrine Tas (BEL)	Lotto–Intermarché Ladies	1h 51' 24"
2	Charlotte Kool (NED)	Fenix–Premier Tech	+ 0"
3	Nicole Steigenga (NED)	AG Insurance–Soudal	+ 0"
4	Scarlett Souren (NED)	VolkerWessels Women Cyclingteam	+ 0"
5	Mia Griffin (IRL)	Team Picnic–PostNL	+ 0"
6	Quinty Ton (NED)	Liv AlUla Jayco	+ 0"
7	Maud Rijnbeek (NED)	VolkerWessels Women Cyclingteam	+ 0"
8	Femke Gerritse (NED)	Team SD Worx–Protime	+ 0"
9	Margaux Vigie (FRA)	Visma–Lease a Bike	+ 0"
10	Femke Markus (NED)	Team SD Worx–Protime	+ 0"

General classification after Stage 1
Rank	Rider	Team	Time
1	Sandrine Tas (BEL)	Lotto–Intermarché Ladies	1h 55' 14"
2	Lieke Nooijen (NED)	Visma–Lease a Bike	+ 1"
3	Charlotte Kool (NED)	Fenix–Premier Tech	+ 3"
4	Lonneke Uneken (NED)	VolkerWessels Women Cyclingteam	+ 9"
5	Femke Markus (NED)	Team SD Worx–Protime	+ 11"
6	Maud Rijnbeek (NED)	VolkerWessels Women Cyclingteam	+ 11"
7	Anneke Dijkstra (NED)	VolkerWessels Women Cyclingteam	+ 11"
8	Nienke Vinke (NED)	Team SD Worx–Protime	+ 12"
9	Letizia Borghesi (ITA)	AG Insurance–Soudal	+ 13"
10	Margaux Vigie (FRA)	Visma–Lease a Bike	+ 13"

=== Stage 2 ===
15 October 2026 – Tilburg to Tilburg, 13.6 km (8.5 mi) (ITT)

Stage 2 Result
Rank	Rider	Team	Time
1	Lieke Nooijen (NED)	Visma–Lease a Bike	16' 56.41"
2	Nienke Vinke (NED)	Team SD Worx–Protime	+ 20.44"
3	Sandrine Tas (BEL)	Lotto–Intermarché Ladies	+ 21.41"
4	Femke de Vries (NED)	Visma–Lease a Bike	+ 24.95"
5	Quinty Ton (NED)	Liv AlUla Jayco	+ 25.15"
6	Anneke Dijkstra (NED)	VolkerWessels Women Cyclingteam	+ 28.58"
7	Letizia Borghesi (ITA)	AG Insurance–Soudal	+ 31.04"
8	Femke Markus (NED)	Team SD Worx–Protime	+ 33.33"
9	Silke Smulders (NED)	Liv AlUla Jayco	+ 34.75"
10	Viktória Chladoňová (SVK)	Visma–Lease a Bike	+ 35.31"

General classification after Stage 2
Rank	Rider	Team	Time
1	Lieke Nooijen (NED)	Visma–Lease a Bike	2h 12' 11"
2	Sandrine Tas (BEL)	Lotto–Intermarché Ladies	+ 20"
3	Nienke Vinke (NED)	Team SD Worx–Protime	+ 31"
4	Quinty Ton (NED)	Liv AlUla Jayco	+ 37"
5	Femke de Vries (NED)	Visma–Lease a Bike	+ 38"
6	Anneke Dijkstra (NED)	VolkerWessels Women Cyclingteam	+ 38"
7	Letizia Borghesi (ITA)	AG Insurance–Soudal	+ 43"
8	Femke Markus (NED)	Team SD Worx–Protime	+ 43"
9	Maud Rijnbeek (NED)	VolkerWessels Women Cyclingteam	+ 47"
10	Silke Smulders (NED)	Liv AlUla Jayco	+ 50"

=== Stage 3 ===
16 October 2026 – Sittard to Watersley, 87.8 km (54.6 mi)

Stage 3 Result
Rank	Rider	Team	Time
1	Femke Markus (NED)	Team SD Worx–Protime	2h 11' 14"
2	Lieke Nooijen (NED)	Visma–Lease a Bike	+ 5"
3	Maud Rijnbeek (NED)	VolkerWessels Women Cyclingteam	+ 5"
4	Pfeiffer Georgi (GBR)	Team Picnic–PostNL	+ 5"
5	Letizia Borghesi (ITA)	AG Insurance–Soudal	+ 5"
6	Charlotte Kool (NED)	Fenix–Premier Tech	+ 5"
7	Florien Bolks (NED)	VolkerWessels Women Cyclingteam	+ 9"
8	Quinty Ton (NED)	Liv AlUla Jayco	+ 10"
9	Nienke Vinke (NED)	Team SD Worx–Protime	+ 10"
10	Silke Smulders (NED)	Liv AlUla Jayco	+ 10"

General classification after stage 3
Rank	Rider	Team	Time
1	Lieke Nooijen (NED)	Visma–Lease a Bike	4h 23' 54"
2	Femke Markus (NED)	Team SD Worx–Protime	+ 28"
3	Nienke Vinke (NED)	Team SD Worx–Protime	+ 42"
4	Maud Rijnbeek (NED)	VolkerWessels Women Cyclingteam	+ 45"
5	Femke de Vries (NED)	Visma–Lease a Bike	+ 47"
6	Quinty Ton (NED)	Liv AlUla Jayco	+ 48"
7	Letizia Borghesi (ITA)	AG Insurance–Soudal	+ 49"
8	Anneke Dijkstra (NED)	VolkerWessels Women Cyclingteam	+ 55"
9	Charlotte Kool (NED)	Fenix–Premier Tech	+ 57"
10	Silke Smulders (NED)	Liv AlUla Jayco	+ 1' 01"

=== Stage 4 ===
17 October 2026 – Hoogeveen to Vamberg, 114.3 km (71.0 mi)

Stage 4 Result
Rank	Rider	Team	Time
1	Letizia Borghesi (ITA)	AG Insurance–Soudal	2h 58' 05"
2	Pfeiffer Georgi (GBR)	Team Picnic–PostNL	+ 4"
3	Lieke Nooijen (NED)	Visma–Lease a Bike	+ 4"
4	Florien Bolks (NED)	VolkerWessels Women Cyclingteam	+ 4"
5	Maud Rijnbeek (NED)	VolkerWessels Women Cyclingteam	+ 4"
6	Sandrine Tas (BEL)	Lotto–Intermarché Ladies	+ 6"
7	Quinty Ton (NED)	Liv AlUla Jayco	+ 10"
8	Nienke Vinke (NED)	Team SD Worx–Protime	+ 10"
9	Femke Markus (NED)	Team SD Worx–Protime	+ 10"
10	Lonneke Uneken (NED)	VolkerWessels Women Cyclingteam	+ 10"

General classification after stage 4
Rank	Rider	Team	Time
1	Lieke Nooijen (NED)	Visma–Lease a Bike	7h 21' 59"
2	Femke Markus (NED)	Team SD Worx–Protime	+ 38"
3	Letizia Borghesi (ITA)	AG Insurance–Soudal	+ 39"
4	Maud Rijnbeek (NED)	VolkerWessels Women Cyclingteam	+ 43"
5	Nienke Vinke (NED)	Team SD Worx–Protime	+ 52"
6	Quinty Ton (NED)	Liv AlUla Jayco	+ 58"
7	Pfeiffer Georgi (GBR)	Team Picnic–PostNL	+ 1' 01"
8	Charlotte Kool (NED)	Fenix–Premier Tech	+ 1' 10"
9	Femke de Vries (NED)	Visma–Lease a Bike	+ 1' 13"
10	Silke Smulders (NED)	Liv AlUla Jayco	+ 1' 23"

=== Stage 5 ===
18 October 2026 – Arnhem to Arnhem, 78.2 km (48.6 mi)

Stage 5 Result
Rank	Rider	Team	Time
1	Marthe Truyen (BEL)	Fenix–Premier Tech	1h 48' 09"
2	Scarlett Souren (NED)	VolkerWessels Women Cyclingteam	+ 0"
3	Charlotte Kool (NED)	Fenix–Premier Tech	+ 0"
4	Mia Griffin (IRL)	Team Picnic–PostNL	+ 0"
5	Letizia Borghesi (ITA)	AG Insurance–Soudal	+ 0"
6	Talia Appleton (AUS)	Liv AlUla Jayco	+ 0"
7	Femke Markus (NED)	Team SD Worx–Protime	+ 0"
8	Maud Rijnbeek (NED)	VolkerWessels Women Cyclingteam	+ 0"
9	Femke Gerritse (NED)	Team SD Worx–Protime	+ 0"
10	Quinty Ton (NED)	Liv AlUla Jayco	+ 0"

Final general classification
Rank	Rider	Team	Time
1	Lieke Nooijen (NED)	Visma–Lease a Bike	9h 10' 08"
2	Femke Markus (NED)	Team SD Worx–Protime	+ 32"
3	Letizia Borghesi (ITA)	AG Insurance–Soudal	+ 37"
4	Maud Rijnbeek (NED)	VolkerWessels Women Cyclingteam	+ 43"
5	Nienke Vinke (NED)	Team SD Worx–Protime	+ 52"
6	Quinty Ton (NED)	Liv AlUla Jayco	+ 54"
7	Pfeiffer Georgi (GBR)	Team Picnic–PostNL	+ 1' 01"
8	Charlotte Kool (NED)	Fenix–Premier Tech	+ 1' 06"
9	Femke de Vries (NED)	Visma–Lease a Bike	+ 1' 13"
10	Silke Smulders (NED)	Liv AlUla Jayco	+ 1' 23"

== Classification leadership table ==
Classification leadership by stage
Stage	Winner	General classification	Points classification	Young rider classification	Most combative rider	Team classification
P	Lieke Nooijen	Lieke Nooijen	Lieke Nooijen (Note: On stage 1, Charlotte Kool, who was second in the points classification, wore the blue jersey, because first-placed Lieke Nooijen wore the orange jersey as the leader of the general classification.)	Nienke Vinke	Lonneke Uneken	Visma–Lease a Bike
1	Sandrine Tas	Sandrine Tas	Charlotte Kool	Nienke Vinke	Fariba Hashimi	Visma–Lease a Bike
2	Lieke Nooijen	Lieke Nooijen	Sandrine Tas	Nienke Vinke	Lieke Nooijen (Note: On stage 2, Silke Smulders, who was second in the combativity classification, wore the maroon jersey, because first-placed Lieke Nooijen wore the orange jersey as the leader of the general classification.)	Visma–Lease a Bike
3	Femke Markus	Lieke Nooijen	Lieke Nooijen (Note: On stage 4 and 5, Sandrine Tas, who was second in the points classification, wore the blue jersey, because first-placed Lieke Nooijen wore the orange jersey as the leader of the general classification.)	Nienke Vinke	Femke Markus	Team SD Worx–Protime
4	Letizia Borghesi	Lieke Nooijen	Lieke Nooijen	Nienke Vinke	Fariba Hashimi	VolkerWessels Women Cyclingteam
5	Marthe Truyen	Lieke Nooijen	Lieke Nooijen	Nienke Vinke	Jeanne Korevaar	VolkerWessels Women Cyclingteam
Final		Lieke Nooijen	Lieke Nooijen	Nienke Vinke	None	VolkerWessels Women Cyclingteam

== Classification standings ==
Legend
Denotes the winner of the general classification	
Denotes the winner of the points classification	Denotes the winner of the young rider classification

=== General classification ===
Final general classification (1–10)
Rank	Rider	Team	Time
1	Lieke Nooijen (NED)	Visma–Lease a Bike	9h 10' 08"
2	Femke Markus (NED)	Team SD Worx–Protime	+ 32"
3	Letizia Borghesi (ITA)	AG Insurance–Soudal	+ 37"
4	Maud Rijnbeek (NED)	VolkerWessels Women Cyclingteam	+ 43"
5	Nienke Vinke (NED)	Team SD Worx–Protime	+ 52"
6	Quinty Ton (NED)	Liv AlUla Jayco	+ 54"
7	Pfeiffer Georgi (GBR)	Team Picnic–PostNL	+ 1' 01"
8	Charlotte Kool (NED)	Fenix–Premier Tech	+ 1' 06"
9	Femke de Vries (NED)	Visma–Lease a Bike	+ 1' 13"
10	Silke Smulders (NED)	Liv AlUla Jayco	+ 1' 23"

=== Points classification ===
Final points classification (1–10)
Rank	Rider	Team	Points
1	Lieke Nooijen (NED)	Visma–Lease a Bike	89
2	Charlotte Kool (NED)	Fenix–Premier Tech	71
3	Sandrine Tas (BEL)	Lotto–Intermarché Ladies	70
4	Letizia Borghesi (ITA)	AG Insurance–Soudal	68
5	Femke Markus (NED)	Team SD Worx–Protime	62
6	Maud Rijnbeek (NED)	VolkerWessels Women Cyclingteam	62
7	Nienke Vinke (NED)	Team SD Worx–Protime	50
8	Quinty Ton (NED)	Liv AlUla Jayco	49
9	Pfeiffer Georgi (GBR)	Team Picnic–PostNL	38
10	Scarlett Souren (NED)	VolkerWessels Women Cyclingteam	35

=== Young rider classification ===
Final young rider classification (1–10)
Rank	Rider	Team	Time
1	Nienke Vinke (NED)	Team SD Worx–Protime	9h 11' 00"
2	Julia Kopecký (CZE)	Team SD Worx–Protime	+ 1' 16"
3	Tess Moerman (BEL)	AG Insurance–Soudal	+ 9' 27"
4	Puck Langenbarg (NED)	Fenix–Premier Tech	+ 9' 58"
5	Eleonora Ciabocco (ITA)	Team Picnic–PostNL	+ 10' 05"
6	Imogen Wolff (GBR)	Visma–Lease a Bike	+ 10' 09"
7	Anna Vanderaerden (BEL)	Fenix–Premier Tech	+ 10' 35"
8	Sveva Klok (NED)	Regioteam Midden-Nederland	+ 11' 13"
9	Talia Appleton (AUS)	Liv AlUla Jayco	+ 11' 34"
10	Daniela Hezinová (CZE)	Team Picnic–PostNL	+ 12' 46"

=== Team classification ===
Final team classification (1–10)
Rank	Team	Time
1	(Netherlands) VolkerWessels Women Cyclingteam	27h 34' 03"
2	(Netherlands) Team SD Worx–Protime	+ 17"
3	(Netherlands) Visma–Lease a Bike	+ 1' 23"
4	(Australia) Liv AlUla Jayco	+ 2' 55"
5	(Netherlands) Fenix–Premier Tech	+ 8' 34"
6	(Netherlands) Team Picnic–PostNL	+ 15' 05"
7	(Belgium) AG Insurance–Soudal	+ 15' 12"
8	(Belgium) Lotto–Intermarché Ladies	+ 15' 58"
9	(Norway) Hitec Products–Fluid Control	+ 39' 18"
10	(United Kingdom) O'Shea Redchilli Bikes	+ 53' 52"
