= 2025 Holland Ladies Tour =

2025 Simac Ladies Tour
2025 UCI Women's World Tour, race 25 of 27

Race details
- Dates: 2–7 September 2025
- Stages: 6
- Distance: 717.3 km (445.7 mi)

Results
Jersey awarded to the overall winner	Winner	Lorena Wiebes (NED)	(Team SD Worx–Protime)
	Second	Elisa Balsamo (ITA)	(Lidl–Trek)
	Third	Megan Jastrab (USA)	(Team Picnic–PostNL)
Jersey awarded to the points classification winner	Points	Lorena Wiebes (NED)	(Team SD Worx–Protime)
Jersey awarded to the young rider classification winner	Young rider	Zoe Bäckstedt (GBR)	(Canyon//SRAM Zondacrypto)
	Team	(Netherlands) Visma–Lease a Bike	

The 2025 Holland Ladies Tour (also known as 2025 Simac Ladies Tour) was the 27th edition of the Holland Ladies Tour road cycling stage race, which was part of the 2025 UCI Women's World Tour. It began on 2 September in Leuven and finished on 7 September in Lichtenvoorde.

== Teams ==
Fourteen UCI Women's WorldTeams and six UCI Women's Continental Teams made up the twenty teams that participated in the race.

UCI Women's WorldTeams

- Team SD Worx–Protime
- AG Insurance–Soudal
- Canyon//SRAM Zondacrypto
- Fenix–Deceuninck
- Human Powered Health
- Lidl–Trek
- FDJ–Suez
- Liv AlUla Jayco
- Movistar Team
- Team Picnic–PostNL
- Visma–Lease a Bike
- UAE Team ADQ
- Uno-X Mobility
- Roland Le Dévoluy

UCI Women's Continental Teams

- EF Education–Oatly
- VolkerWessels Women Cyclingteam
- Cofidis
- Lotto Ladies
- Team Coop–Repsol
- DD Group Pro Cycling Team

== Route ==
Stage characteristics and winners
Stage	Date	Course	Distance	Type	Stage winner
1	2 September	Leuven to Leuven	81.3 km (50.5 mi)	Flat stage	Lorena Wiebes (NED)
2	3 September	Gennep to Gennep	124.5 km (77.4 mi)	Hilly stage	Lorena Wiebes (NED)
3	4 September	Zeewolde to Zeewolde	160.1 km (99.5 mi)	Flat stage	Lorena Wiebes (NED)
4	5 September	Alkmaar to Alkmaar	125.8 km (78.2 mi)	Flat stage	Lorena Wiebes (NED)
5	6 September	Doetinchem to Westendorp	10.2 km (6.3 mi)	Individual time trial	Zoe Bäckstedt (GBR)
6	7 September	Lichtenvoorde to Lichtenvoorde	156.3 km (97.1 mi)	Flat stage	Lorena Wiebes (NED)
Total			658.2 km (409.0 mi)		

== Stages ==
=== Stage 1 ===
2 September — Leuven to Leuven, 81.3 km (50.5 mi)

Stage 1 Result
Rank	Rider	Team	Time
1	Lorena Wiebes (NED)	Team SD Worx–Protime	1h 58' 25"
2	Elisa Balsamo (ITA)	Lidl–Trek	+ 0"
3	Clara Copponi (FRA)	Lidl–Trek	+ 0"
4	Pfeiffer Georgi (GBR)	Team Picnic–PostNL	+ 0"
5	Margaux Vigié (FRA)	Visma–Lease a Bike	+ 0"
6	Maria Giulia Confalonieri (ITA)	Uno-X Mobility	+ 0"
7	Shari Bossuyt (BEL)	AG Insurance–Soudal	+ 0"
8	Lily Williams (USA)	Human Powered Health	+ 0"
9	Letizia Borghesi (ITA)	EF Education–Oatly	+ 0"
10	Cat Ferguson (GBR)	Movistar Team	+ 0"

General classification after Stage 1
Rank	Rider	Team	Time
1	Lorena Wiebes (NED)	Team SD Worx–Protime	1h 58' 25"
2	Elisa Balsamo (ITA)	Lidl–Trek	+ 4"
3	Clara Copponi (FRA)	Lidl–Trek	+ 6"
4	Pfeiffer Georgi (GBR)	Team Picnic–PostNL	+ 10"
5	Margaux Vigié (FRA)	Visma–Lease a Bike	+ 10"
6	Maria Giulia Confalonieri (ITA)	Uno-X Mobility	+ 10"
7	Shari Bossuyt (BEL)	AG Insurance–Soudal	+ 10"
8	Lily Williams (USA)	Human Powered Health	+ 10"
9	Letizia Borghesi (ITA)	EF Education–Oatly	+ 10"
10	Cat Ferguson (GBR)	Movistar Team	+ 10"

=== Stage 2 ===
3 September — Gennep to Gennep, 124.5 km (77.4 mi)

Stage 2 Result
Rank	Rider	Team	Time
1	Lorena Wiebes (NED)	Team SD Worx–Protime	2h 55' 39"
2	Clara Copponi (FRA)	Lidl–Trek	+ 0"
3	Megan Jastrab (USA)	Team Picnic–PostNL	+ 0"
4	Margaux Vigié (FRA)	Visma–Lease a Bike	+ 0"
5	Linda Zanetti (SUI)	Uno-X Mobility	+ 0"
6	Elisa Balsamo (ITA)	Lidl–Trek	+ 0"
7	Maria Giulia Confalonieri (ITA)	Uno-X Mobility	+ 0"
8	Riejanne Markus (NED)	Lidl–Trek	+ 0"
9	Femke Markus (NED)	Team SD Worx–Protime	+ 0"
10	Barbara Guarischi (ITA)	Team SD Worx–Protime	+ 18"

General classification after Stage 2
Rank	Rider	Team	Time
1	Lorena Wiebes (NED)	Team SD Worx–Protime	4h 58' 25"
2	Clara Copponi (FRA)	Lidl–Trek	+ 10"
3	Elisa Balsamo (ITA)	Lidl–Trek	+ 14"
4	Megan Jastrab (USA)	Team Picnic–PostNL	+ 16"
5	Margaux Vigié (FRA)	Visma–Lease a Bike	+ 20"
6	Maria Giulia Confalonieri (ITA)	Uno-X Mobility	+ 20"
7	Linda Zanetti (SUI)	Uno-X Mobility	+ 20"
8	Riejanne Markus (NED)	Lidl–Trek	+ 20"
9	Barbara Guarischi (ITA)	Team SD Worx–Protime	+ 38"
10	Cat Ferguson (GBR)	Movistar Team	+ 1'04"

=== Stage 3 ===
4 September — Zeewolde to Zeewolde, 160.1 km (99.5 mi)

Stage 3 Result
Rank	Rider	Team	Time
1	Lorena Wiebes (NED)	Team SD Worx–Protime	3h 40' 01"
2	Megan Jastrab (USA)	Team Picnic–PostNL	+ 0"
3	Amalie Dideriksen (DEN)	Cofidis	+ 0"
4	Nienke Veenhoven (NED)	Visma–Lease a Bike	+ 0"
5	Lara Gillespie (IRE)	UAE Team ADQ	+ 0"
6	Lily Williams (USA)	Human Powered Health	+ 0"
7	Cat Ferguson (GBR)	Movistar Team	+ 0"
8	Babette van der Wolf (NED)	EF Education–Oatly	+ 0"
9	Marie Le Net (FRA)	FDJ–Suez	+ 0"
10	Elisa Balsamo (ITA)	Lidl–Trek	+ 0"

General classification after Stage 3
Rank	Rider	Team	Time
1	Lorena Wiebes (NED)	Team SD Worx–Protime	8h 33' 35"
2	Megan Jastrab (USA)	Team Picnic–PostNL	+ 20"
3	Elisa Balsamo (ITA)	Lidl–Trek	+ 24"
4	Margaux Vigié (FRA)	Visma–Lease a Bike	+ 30"
5	Lily Williams (USA)	Human Powered Health	+ 1' 14"
6	Cat Ferguson (GBR)	Movistar Team	+ 1' 14"
7	Babette van der Wolf (NED)	EF Education–Oatly	+ 1' 14"
8	Lieke Nooijen (NED)	Visma–Lease a Bike	+ 1' 14"
9	Nienke Veenhoven (NED)	Visma–Lease a Bike	+ 1' 14"
10	Christina Schweinberger (AUT)	Fenix–Deceuninck	+ 1' 14"

=== Stage 4 ===
5 September — Alkmaar to Alkmaar, 125.8 km (78.2 mi)

Stage 4 Result
Rank	Rider	Team	Time
1	Lorena Wiebes (NED)	Team SD Worx–Protime	2h 54' 37"
2	Chiara Consonni (ITA)	Canyon//SRAM Zondacrypto	+ 0"
3	Shari Bossuyt (BEL)	AG Insurance–Soudal	+ 0"
4	Elisa Balsamo (ITA)	Lidl–Trek	+ 0"
5	Linda Zanetti (SUI)	Uno-X Mobility	+ 0"
6	Maria Giulia Confalonieri (ITA)	Uno-X Mobility	+ 0"
7	Cat Ferguson (GBR)	Movistar Team	+ 0"
8	Kaja Rysz (POL)	Roland Le Dévoluy	+ 0"
9	Lara Gillespie (IRE)	UAE Team ADQ	+ 0"
10	Babette van der Wolf (NED)	EF Education–Oatly	+ 0"

General classification after Stage 4
Rank	Rider	Team	Time
1	Lorena Wiebes (NED)	Team SD Worx–Protime	11h 28' 02"
2	Megan Jastrab (USA)	Team Picnic–PostNL	+ 30"
3	Elisa Balsamo (ITA)	Lidl–Trek	+ 34"
4	Margaux Vigié (FRA)	Visma–Lease a Bike	+ 40"
5	Cat Ferguson (GBR)	Movistar Team	+ 1' 24"
6	Lily Williams (USA)	Human Powered Health	+ 1' 24"
7	Babette van der Wolf (NED)	EF Education–Oatly	+ 1' 24"
8	Lara Gillespie (IRE)	UAE Team ADQ	+ 1' 24"
9	Nienke Veenhoven (NED)	Visma–Lease a Bike	+ 1' 24"
10	Lieke Nooijen (NED)	Visma–Lease a Bike	+ 1' 24"

=== Stage 5 ===
6 September — Doetinchem to Westendorp, 10.2 km (6.3 mi) (ITT)

Stage 5 Result
Rank	Rider	Team	Time
1	Zoe Bäckstedt (GBR)	Canyon//SRAM Zondacrypto	12' 34.25"
2	Christina Schweinberger (AUT)	Fenix–Deceuninck	+ 6.26"
3	Ellen Van Dijk (NED)	Lidl–Trek	+ 17.73"
4	Lieke Nooijen (NED)	Visma–Lease a Bike	+ 24.46"
5	Marthe Goossens (BEL)	AG Insurance–Soudal	+ 25.39"
6	Karlijn Swinkels (NED)	UAE Team ADQ	+ 25.59"
7	Vittoria Guazzini (ITA)	FDJ–Suez	+ 28.34"
8	Femke Markus (NED)	Team SD Worx–Protime	+ 32.49"
9	Lorena Wiebes (NED)	Team SD Worx–Protime	+ 33.73"
10	Lily Williams (USA)	Human Powered Health	+ 36.10"

General classification after Stage 5
Rank	Rider	Team	Time
1	Lorena Wiebes (NED)	Team SD Worx–Protime	11h 41' 09"
2	Elisa Balsamo (ITA)	Lidl–Trek	+ 48"
3	Megan Jastrab (USA)	Team Picnic–PostNL	+ 51"
4	Zoe Bäckstedt (GBR)	Canyon//SRAM Zondacrypto	+ 51"
5	Margaux Vigié (FRA)	Visma–Lease a Bike	+ 56"
6	Christina Schweinberger (AUT)	Fenix–Deceuninck	+ 57"
7	Lieke Nooijen (NED)	Visma–Lease a Bike	+ 1' 15"
8	Karlijn Swinkels (NED)	UAE Team ADQ	+ 1' 16"
9	Lily Williams (USA)	Human Powered Health	+ 1' 27"
10	Cat Ferguson (GBR)	Movistar Team	+ 1' 36"

=== Stage 6 ===
7 September — Lichtenvoorde to Lichtenvoorde, 156.3 km (97.1 mi)

Stage 6 Result
Rank	Rider	Team	Time
1	Lorena Wiebes (NED)	Team SD Worx–Protime	3h 45' 46"
2	Nienke Veenhoven (NED)	Visma–Lease a Bike	+ 0"
3	Elisa Balsamo (ITA)	Lidl–Trek	+ 0"
4	Chiara Consonni (ITA)	Canyon//SRAM Zondacrypto	+ 0"
5	Megan Jastrab (USA)	Team Picnic–PostNL	+ 0"
6	Linda Zanetti (SUI)	Uno-X Mobility	+ 0"
7	Letizia Paternoster (ITA)	Liv AlUla Jayco	+ 0"
8	Amalie Dideriksen (DEN)	Cofidis	+ 0"
9	Shari Bossuyt (BEL)	AG Insurance–Soudal	+ 0"
10	Kaja Rysz (POL)	Roland Le Dévoluy	+ 0"

General classification after Stage 6
Rank	Rider	Team	Time
1	Lorena Wiebes (NED)	Team SD Worx–Protime	15h 26' 45"
2	Elisa Balsamo (ITA)	Lidl–Trek	+ 54"
3	Megan Jastrab (USA)	Team Picnic–PostNL	+ 1' 01"
4	Zoe Bäckstedt (GBR)	Canyon//SRAM Zondacrypto	+ 1' 01"
5	Margaux Vigié (FRA)	Visma–Lease a Bike	+ 1' 06"
6	Christina Schweinberger (AUT)	Fenix–Deceuninck	+ 1' 07"
7	Lieke Nooijen (NED)	Visma–Lease a Bike	+ 1' 25"
8	Karlijn Swinkels (NED)	UAE Team ADQ	+ 1' 26"
9	Lily Williams (USA)	Human Powered Health	+ 1' 37"
10	Cat Ferguson (GBR)	Movistar Team	+ 1' 46"

== Classification standings ==
Legend
Denotes the winner of the general classification
Denotes the winner of the points classification
Denotes the winner of the young rider classification

=== General classification ===
Final general classification (1–10)
Rank	Rider	Team	Time
1	Lorena Wiebes (NED)	Team SD Worx–Protime	15h 26' 45"
2	Elisa Balsamo (ITA)	Lidl–Trek	+ 54"
3	Megan Jastrab (USA)	Team Picnic–PostNL	+ 1' 01"
4	Zoe Bäckstedt (GBR)	Canyon//SRAM Zondacrypto	+ 1' 01"
5	Margaux Vigié (FRA)	Visma–Lease a Bike	+ 1' 06"
6	Christina Schweinberger (AUT)	Fenix–Deceuninck	+ 1' 07"
7	Lieke Nooijen (NED)	Visma–Lease a Bike	+ 1' 25"
8	Karlijn Swinkels (NED)	UAE Team ADQ	+ 1' 26"
9	Lily Williams (USA)	Human Powered Health	+ 1' 37"
10	Cat Ferguson (GBR)	Movistar Team	+ 1' 46"

=== Points classification ===
Final points classification (1–10)
Rank	Rider	Team	Points
1	Lorena Wiebes (NED)	Team SD Worx–Protime	132
2	Elisa Balsamo (ITA)	Lidl–Trek	66
3	Megan Jastrab (USA)	Team Picnic–PostNL	48
4	Nienke Veenhoven (NED)	Visma–Lease a Bike	39
5	Chiara Consonni (ITA)	Canyon//SRAM Zondacrypto	35
6	Linda Zanetti (SUI)	Uno-X Mobility	34
7	Shari Bossuyt (BEL)	AG Insurance–Soudal	32
8	Zoe Bäckstedt (GBR)	Canyon//SRAM Zondacrypto	30
9	Margaux Vigié (FRA)	Visma–Lease a Bike	30
10	Lily Williams (USA)	Human Powered Health	29

=== Youth classification ===
Final youth classification (1–10)
Rank	Rider	Team	Time
1	Zoe Bäckstedt (GBR)	Canyon//SRAM Zondacrypto	15h 27' 46"
2	Cat Ferguson (GBR)	Movistar Team	+ 45"
3	Nienke Veenhoven (NED)	Visma–Lease a Bike	+ 1' 15"
4	Babette van der Wolf (NED)	EF Education–Oatly	+ 1' 49"
5	Scarlett Souren (NED)	VolkerWessels Women Cyclingteam	+ 8' 47"
6	Linda Riedmann (GER)	Visma–Lease a Bike	+ 9' 00"
7	Flora Perkins (GBR)	Fenix–Deceuninck	+ 9' 57"
8	Carys Lloyd (GBR)	Movistar Team	+ 13' 41"
9	Lisa van Belle (NED)	Team SD Worx–Protime	+ 13' 41"
10	Stina Kagevi (SWE)	Team Coop–Repsol	+ 14' 01"

=== Team classification ===
Final team classification (1-10)
Rank	Team	Time
1	(Netherlands) Visma–Lease a Bike	46h 24' 32"
2	(Netherlands) Team SD Worx–Protime	+ 7' 30"
3	(United Arab Emirates) UAE Team ADQ	+ 9' 48"
4	(United States) Lidl–Trek	+ 13' 59"
5	(Belgium) AG Insurance–Soudal	+ 16' 32"
6	(Belgium) Fenix–Deceuninck	+ 16' 35"
7	(United States) EF Education–Oatly	+ 17' 12"
8	(Netherlands) Team Picnic–PostNL	+ 17' 21"
9	(United States) Human Powered Health	+ 17' 37"
10	(Spain) Movistar Team	+ 18' 19"
