= Holland Ladies Tour =

Women's professional road bicycle race

Race details
- Date: September
- Region: Netherlands
- English name: Holland Ladies Tour
- Discipline: Road race
- Competition: UCI Women's Road Rankings
- Type: Stage race
- Organiser: Courage, cycling events
- Race director: Thijs Rondhuis
- Web site: www.hollandladiestour.nl

History
- First edition: 1998
- Editions: 28 (as of 2026)
- First winner: Elsbeth Vink (NED)
- Most wins: Marianne Vos (NED) (4 wins)
- Most recent: Lieke Nooijen (NED)

The Holland Ladies Tour is a women's elite professional road bicycle racing stage race held annually in September since 1998 in the Netherlands. It is a tour with 6 or 7 stages. For sponsorship reasons, the 2011 race was officially titled the Profile Ladies Tour, the 2012 race the BrainWash Ladies Tour, from 2013 to 2019 as the Boels Rental Ladies Tour, and from 2021 to 2025 as the Simac Ladies Tour. The race was not held in 2020.

From 2026, Eneco becomes the title sponsor, becoming Eneco Tour Women, and the race were integrated with the men's Tour of Holland, sharing the same route on the same date. Because of this, the race class were demoted from WorldTour to 2.1 as the race dates in October clashes with the planned Women's World Tour end of season race Tour of Guangxi.

== Past winners ==
Year	First	Second	Third
1998	Elsbeth Vink (NED)	Leontien van Moorsel (NED)	Ingunn Bollerud (NOR)
1999	Leontien van Moorsel (NED)	Judith Arndt (GER)	Susanne Ljungskog (SWE)
2000	Mirjam Melchers (NED)	Ina-Yoko Teutenberg (GER)	Susanne Ljungskog (SWE)
2001	Petra Rossner (GER)	Diana Žiliūtė (LTU)	Debby Mansveld (NED)
2002	Debby Mansveld (NED)	Mirjam Melchers (NED)	Arenda Grimberg (NED)
2003	Susanne Ljungskog (SWE)	Trixi Worrack (GER)	Olga Zabelinskaya (RUS)
2004	Mirjam Melchers (NED)	Trixi Worrack (GER)	Sissy van Alebeek (NED)
2005	Tanja Schmidt-Hennes (GER)	Susanne Ljungskog (SWE)	Mirjam Melchers (NED)
2006	Susanne Ljungskog (SWE)	Trixi Worrack (GER)	Judith Arndt (GER)
2007	Kristin Armstrong (USA)	Judith Arndt (GER)	Linda Villumsen (DEN)
2008	Charlotte Becker (GER)	Ina-Yoko Teutenberg (GER)	Irene van den Broek (NED)
2009	Marianne Vos (NED)	Kirsten Wild (NED)	Ina-Yoko Teutenberg (GER)
2010	Marianne Vos (NED)	Kirsten Wild (NED)	Ellen van Dijk (NED)
2011	Marianne Vos (NED)	Emma Johansson (SWE)	Kirsten Wild (NED)
2012	Marianne Vos (NED)	Evelyn Stevens (USA)	Judith Arndt (GER)
2013	Ellen van Dijk (NED)	Annemiek van Vleuten (NED)	Lizzie Armitstead (GBR)
2014	Evelyn Stevens (USA)	Lisa Brennauer (GER)	Ellen van Dijk (NED)
2015	Lisa Brennauer (GER)	Lucinda Brand (NED)	Ellen van Dijk (NED)
2016	Chantal Blaak (NED)	Ellen van Dijk (NED)	Alena Amialiusik (BLR)
2017	Annemiek van Vleuten (NED)	Anna van der Breggen (NED)	Ellen van Dijk (NED)
2018	Annemiek van Vleuten (NED)	Ellen van Dijk (NED)	Anna van der Breggen (NED)
2019	Christine Majerus (LUX)	Lorena Wiebes (NED)	Lisa Klein (GER)
2020	No race due to the COVID-19 pandemic.		
2021	Chantal van den Broek-Blaak (NED)	Marlen Reusser (SUI)	Ellen van Dijk (NED)
2022	Lorena Wiebes (NED)	Audrey Cordon-Ragot (FRA)	Karlijn Swinkels (NED)
2023	Lotte Kopecky (BEL)	Lorena Wiebes (NED)	Anna Henderson (GBR)
2024	Lotte Kopecky (BEL)	Franziska Koch (GER)	Zoe Bäckstedt (GBR)
2025	Lorena Wiebes (NED)	Elisa Balsamo (ITA)	Megan Jastrab (USA)
2026	Lieke Nooijen (NED)	Femke Markus (NED)	Letizia Borghesi (ITA)
