= Dominika Włodarczyk =

Polish racing cyclist

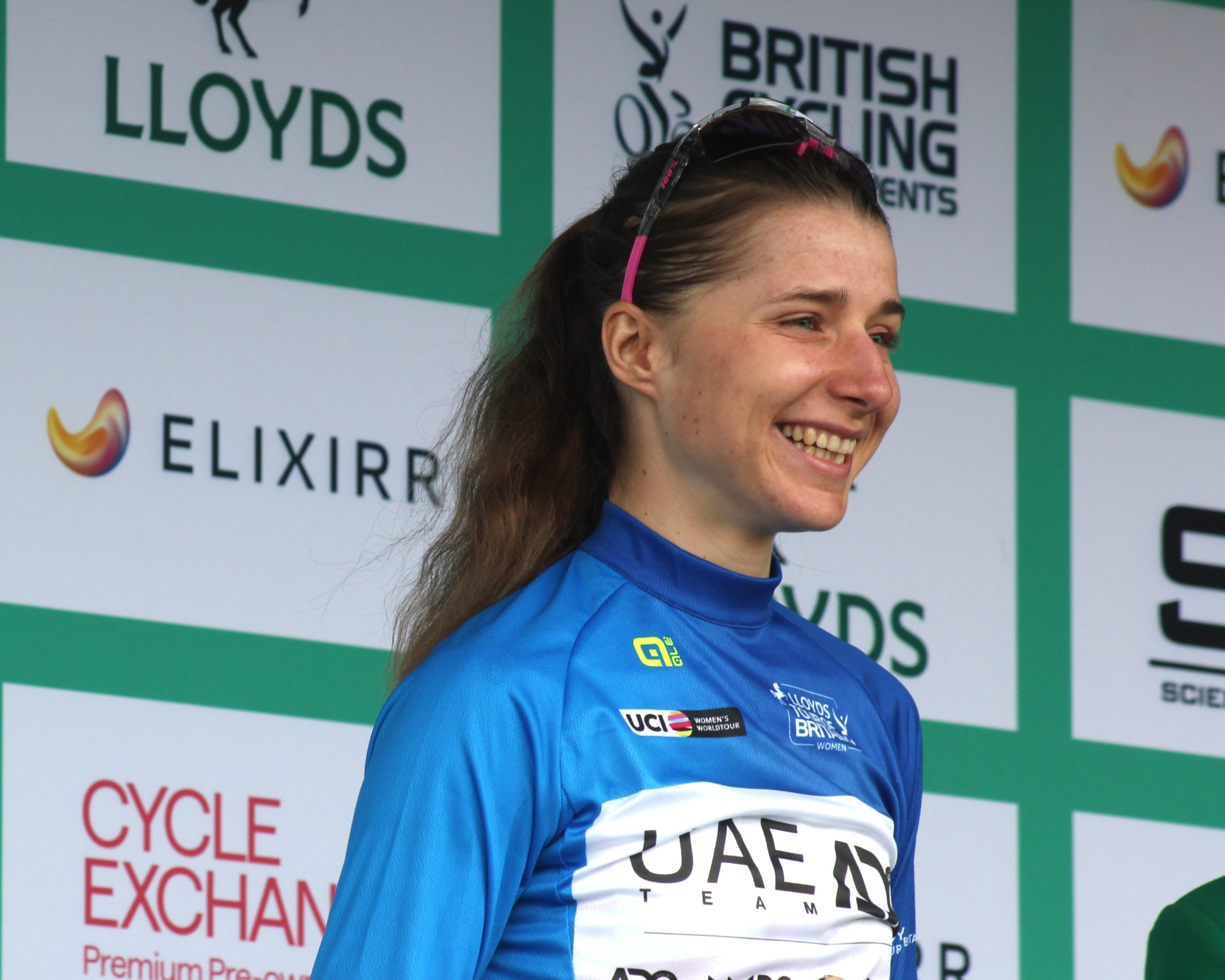
- Włodarczyk at the Tour of Britain in 2025

Personal information
- Born: 27 January 2001 (age 25)
- Height: 1.72 m (5 ft 8 in)

Cycling career
- Sport: Cycling
- Current team: UAE Team L'Imad
- Disciplines: Road; Cyclo-cross
- Role: Rider

Amateur team
- 2020–2021: MAT Atom Deweloper

Professional teams
- 2022–2023: ATOM Deweloper Posciellux.pl Wrocław
- 2024–: UAE Team ADQ

Dominika Włodarczyk (born 27 January 2001) is a Polish professional racing cyclist, who currently rides for UCI Women's WorldTeam UAE Team L'Imad.

== Major results ==
=== Road ===
2019
National Junior Championships

2nd Road race
2nd Time trial

2021
2nd Overall Belgrade GP Woman Tour

1st Young rider classification
1st Stage 2

3rd Road race, National Championships
2022
1st Overall Watersley Women's Challenge

1st Stages 1 & 3

2nd Overall Giro della Toscana

1st Young rider classification
1st Stage 3

3rd Time trial, National Under-23 Championships
3rd Overall Princess Anna Vasa Tour

1st Mountains classification
1st Young rider classification

4th Overall Gracia–Orlová
4th Ladies Tour of Estonia
7th Road race, UEC European Under-23 Championships
7th Memorial Monica Bandini
10th Trofeo Oro in Euro
2023
1st Overall Watersley Women's Challenge

1st Stage 2

2nd Overall Gracia–Orlová

1st Points classification
1st Stages 1 & 5

2nd Overall Tour de Feminin

1st Points classification
1st Young rider classification
1st Stage 1 (ITT)

2nd Overall Princess Anna Vasa Tour

1st Points classification
1st Mountains classification
1st Young rider classification

2nd Respect Ladies Race Slovakia
3rd Grand Prix du Morbihan
5th Time trial, National Championships
5th Overall Bretagne Ladies Tour
7th Road race, UCI World Under-23 Championships
8th Overall Trofeo Ponente in Rosa
9th Grand Prix Stuttgart
10th Road race, UEC European Under-23 Championships
2024
1st Road race, National Championships
2nd Cadel Evans Great Ocean Road Race
4th Overall Princess Anna Vasa Tour

1st Mountains classification

4th Clasica Femenina Navarra
5th Overall Tour Down Under
6th Overall Tour Cycliste Féminin International de l'Ardèche
6th Grand Prix Stuttgart & Region
9th Grand Prix du Morbihan Féminin
2025
3rd Clásica de Almería
4th Overall Tour de France
4th Overall Tour Down Under
2026
4th Overall Tour Down Under
5th Cadel Evans Great Ocean Road Race
5th Milan–San Remo
8th UCI Road World Championships – Women's road race
9th Overall Itzulia Women

1st Stages 2 & 3

9th UCI Road World Championships – Women's time trial

=== Cyclo-cross ===
2021–2022
1st National Championships
3rd Gościęcin
2022–2023
1st National Championships
2nd Mikołów
2023–2024
1st Laskowice

== Other websites ==
- Dominika Włodarczyk at UCI
- Dominika Włodarczyk at ProCyclingStats
- Dominika Włodarczyk at InterSportStats
