= Malwina Mul =

Polish cyclist (born 2004)

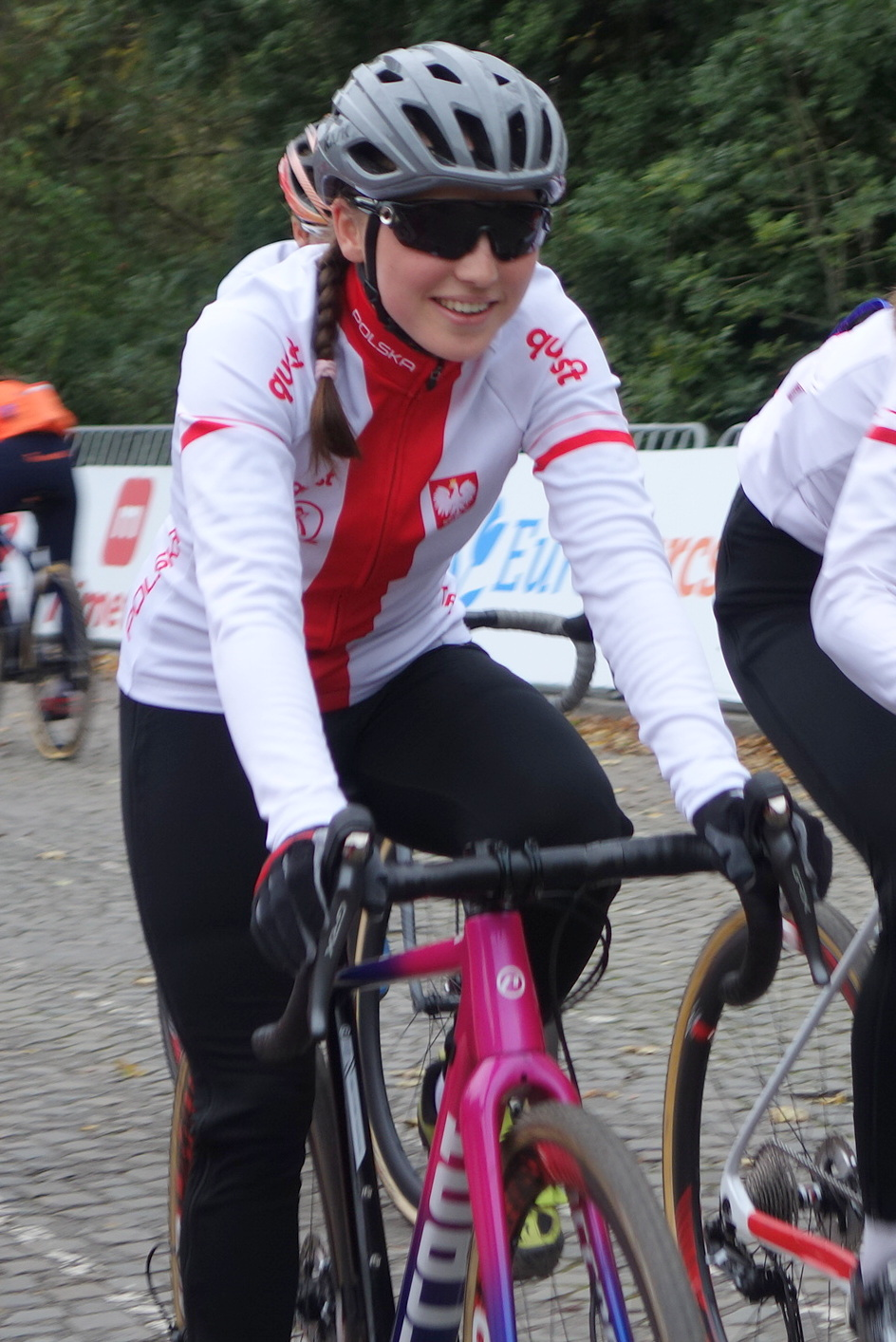
- Mul in 2022

Personal information
- Born: 28 February 2004 (age 22) Leżajsk, Poland

Cycling career
- Sport: Cycling
- Current team: Cofidis
- Disciplines: Road; Cyclo-cross
- Role: Rider

Professional teams
- 2023–2025: MAT Atom Deweloper Wrocław
- 2026–: Cofidis

Malwina Mul (born 28 February 2004) is a Polish cyclist, who currently rides for UCI Women's ProTeam Cofidis.

== Career ==
Mul initially signed a two year deal with Cofidis starting in the 2026 season, but this was extended by an additional year in June 2026. She made her debut for the team at Vuelta CV Feminas finishing 42nd.

She made her grand tour debut at the 2026 Tour de France Femmes.

== Major results ==
2023
1st Stage 2 Tour de Feminin
2025
2nd Overall Tour de Feminin

1st Points clasification
1st Young rider classification
