= Agnieszka Skalniak-Sójka =

Polish cyclist (born 1997)

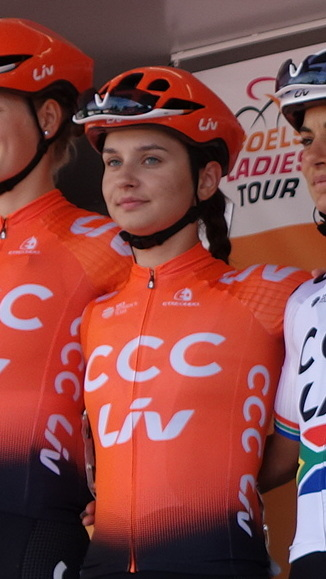
- Skalniak-Sójka in 2019

Personal information
- Full name: Agnieszka Skalniak-Sójka
- Born: Agnieszka Skalniak; 22 April 1997 (age 29) Krynica-Zdrój, Poland

Cycling career
- Sport: Cycling
- Current team: Canyon//SRAM
- Discipline: Road
- Role: Rider

Amateur team
- 2021: MAT ATOM Deweloper Wrocław

Professional teams
- 2017: Astana
- 2018: Experza–Footlogix
- 2019–2020: CCC - Liv
- 2022: ATOM Deweloper Posciellux.pl Wrocław
- 2023–: Canyon//SRAM

Agnieszka Skalniak-Sójka (née Skalniak; born 22 April 1997) is a Polish racing cyclist, who currently rides for UCI Women's WorldTeam Canyon//SRAM.

== Major results ==
2014
2nd Road race, National Junior Road Championships
3rd Road race, UCI Junior Road World Championships
2015
1st Time Trial UEC European Junior Road Championships
1st Road race, National Junior Road Championships

1st UCI Junior Road World Championships
3rd Road Race
9th Time Trial

10th Piccolo Trofeo Alfredo Binda
2016
9th Road race, National Road Championships
2017
National Road Championships

3rd Time trial
10th Road race

6th Time trial, UEC European Road Championships
2018
1st Stage 2 Tour de Feminin-O cenu Českého Švýcarska
National Road Championships

5th Time trial
7th Road race

9th Dwars door de Westhoek
UEC European Under-23 Road Championships

10th Road Race
10th Time Trial

2019
National Road Championships

2nd Road race
2nd Time trial Under-23
4th Time trial

8th Time trial, UEC European Road Championships
8th Team Time Trial, Postnord UCI WWT Vårgårda WestSweden
9th Clasica Femenina Navarra
2020
National Road Championships

4th Time trial
5th Road race

2021
1st Overall Belgrade GP Woman Tour

1st Stage 1b

National Road Championships

4th Time trial
7th Road race

2022
National Road Championships

1st Time trial
5th Road race

1st Overall Gracia Orlová

1st Points classification
1st Stages 1, 3b & 4

1st Overall Belgium Tour

1st Prologue

1st Overall Princess Anna Vasa Tour

1st Points classification
1st Stages 1, 2 & 3

1st Overall Giro Toscana Int. Femminile - Memorial Michela Fanini

1st Points classification
1st Prologue

1st Ladies Tour of Estonia
3rd Visegrad 4 Ladies Series Hungary
4th Visegrad 4 Ladies Series Slovakia
5th Gran Premio della Liberazione
6th Grand Prix du Morbihan Féminin
10th Time trial, UEC European Road Championships
2023
National Road Championships

1st Time trial
5th Road race

6th Overall Vuelta a Burgos Feminas
7th UCI Road World Championships – Women's time trial
9th Overall Tour de Normandie
Combativity award Stage 6 Tour de France
2024
National Road Championships

3rd Time trial
6th Road race

2025
1st Maryland Cycling Classic Women
6th Trofeo Binissalem-Andratx
6th Overall Setmana Ciclista Valenciana
9th Trofeo Palma Femina
