= MAT Atom Deweloper Wrocław =

Polish cycling team

Team information
- UCI code: MAS (2016–); MAD (2017–2021); ATO (2022–)
- Registered: Poland
- Founded: 2016
- Discipline: Road
- Status: National (2016–2021); UCI Women's Continental Team (2022–)

Team name history
- 2016 2017–2021 2022 2023–: MAT ATOM Sobótka; MAT ATOM Deweloper; ATOM Deweloper Posciellux.pl Wrocław; MAT Atom Deweloper Wrocław

MAT Atom Deweloper Wrocław is a Polish-based women's road cycling team that was founded in 2016, before joining the UCI in 2022.

== Major results ==
2019
Stage 5 Tour de Feminin, Katarzyna Wilkos
Kievskaya Sotka Women Challenge, Katarzyna Wilkos

2021
Overall Belgrade GP Woman Tour, Agnieszka Skalniak-Sójka

Stage 1b, Agnieszka Skalniak-Sójka
Stage 2, Dominika Wlodarcyzk

Overall Gracia–Orlová, Agnieszka Skalniak-Sójka

Points classification, Agnieszka Skalniak-Sójka
Stages 1, 3b & 4, Agnieszka Skalniak-Sójka

2022
Overall Gracia Orlová, Agnieszka Skalniak-Sójka

Points classification, Agnieszka Skalniak-Sójka
Stages 1, 3b & 4, Agnieszka Skalniak-Sójka

Overall Belgium Tour, Agnieszka Skalniak-Sójka

Prologue, Agnieszka Skalniak-Sójka

Overall Princess Anna Vasa Tour, Agnieszka Skalniak-Sójka

Points classification, Agnieszka Skalniak-Sójka
Stages 1, 2 & 3, Agnieszka Skalniak-Sójka

Ladies Tour of Estonia, Agnieszka Skalniak-Sójka
Districtenpijl - Ekeren-Deurne, Daria Pikulik
Overall Giro Toscana Int. Femminile – Memorial Michela Fanini, Agnieszka Skalniak-Sójka

Points classification, Agnieszka Skalniak-Sójka
Prologue, Agnieszka Skalniak-Sójka
Stage 4, Dominika Włodarczyk

2023
Points classification Gracia–Orlova, Dominika Włodarczyk

Stages 1 & 5, Dominika Włodarczyk
Stage 4, Malwina Mul

Points classification Tour de Feminin, Dominika Włodarczyk

Youth classification, Dominika Włodarczyk
Stages 1 (ITT) & 3, Dominika Włodarczyk
Stage 2, Malwina Mul

Overall Belgrade GP Woman Tour, Nikola Bajgerová

Youth classification, Olga Wankiewicz
Stage 1, Nikola Bajgerová
Stage 2, Monika Brzezna

== National champions ==
2017
Poland U23 Cyclocross, Patrycja Lorkowska

2018
Poland Track (Individual pursuit), Justyna Kaczkowska
Poland Track (Scratch race), Łucja Pietrzak

2019
Poland Road Race, Łucja Pietrzak
Poland Track (Individual pursuit), Justyna Kaczkowska

2022
Poland Cyclocross, Dominika Włodarczyk
Poland Time Trial, Agnieszka Skalniak-Sójka
Poland Road Race, Wiktoria Pikulik

2023
Poland U23 Time Trial, Dominika Włodarczyk
