= Meike Uiterwijk Winkel =

Dutch cyclist

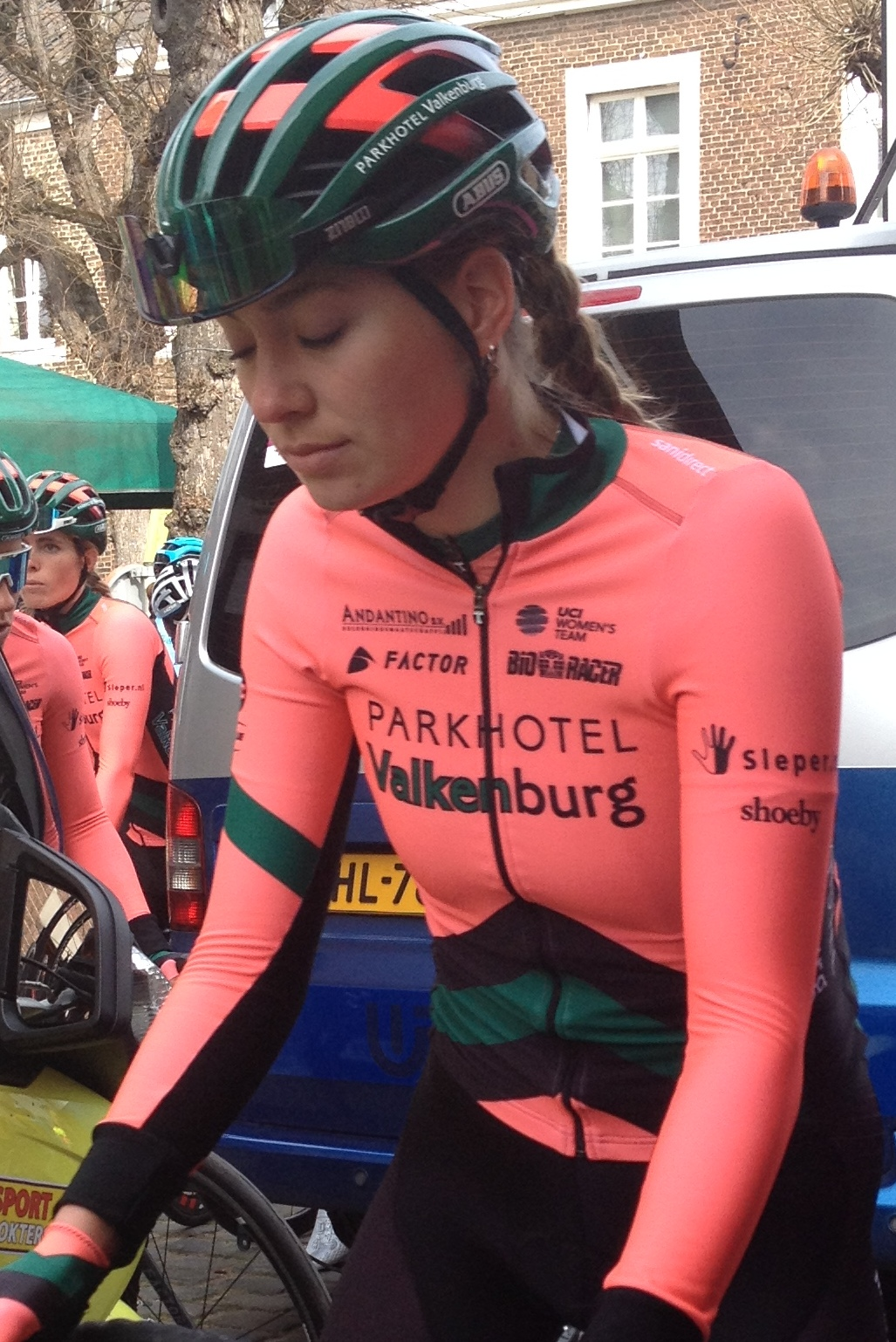
- Uiterwijk Winkel in 2019

Personal information
- Full name: Meike Uiterwijk Winkel
- Born: 4 December 1999 (age 26)

Cycling career
- Sport: Cycling
- Discipline: Road
- Role: Rider

Professional team
- 2018–2019: Parkhotel Valkenburg

Meike Uiterwijk Winkel (born 4 December 1999) is a Dutch professional racing cyclist, who last rode for the UCI Women's Team Parkhotel Valkenburg during the 2019 women's road cycling season.
