= Algerian Cycling Federation =

National governing body of cycle racing in South Africa

- Sport: Cycling
- Abbreviation: FAC
- Affiliation: UCI
- Regional affiliation: African Cycling Confederation
- Headquarters: Algiers
- Location: 111 Didouche Mourad Road, 16014 - Sidi M'Hamed, Algiers
- President: Kheireddine Barbari

Official website
- www.fac.dz
- (Algeria)

Algerian Cycling Federation (Arabic: الإتحادية الجزائرية للدراجات, French: Fédération Algérienne de Cyclisme), abbreviated to FAC for a short, is the national governing body of cycle racing in Algeria. In addition to the African Cycling Confederation, it is affiliated to the Arab Cycling Federation since 1975. The current president is Kheireddine Barbari.
