= 2019 Holland Ladies Tour =

2019 Boels Rental Ladies Tour
2019 UCI Women's World Tour, race 21 of 23

Race details
- Dates: 3–8 September 2019
- Stages: 5 + Prologue
- Distance: 691 km (429 mi)
- Winning time: 17h 1' 17"

Results
Jersey awarded to the overall winner	Winner	Christine Majerus (LUX)	(Boels–Dolmans)
	Second	Lorena Wiebes (NED)	(Parkhotel Valkenburg)
	Third	Lisa Klein (GER)	(Canyon//SRAM)
Jersey awarded to the points classification winner	Points	Lorena Wiebes (NED)	(Parkhotel Valkenburg)
Jersey awarded to the mountains classification winner	Mountains	Lucinda Brand (NED)	(Team Sunweb)
Jersey awarded to the youth classification winner	Youth	Lorena Wiebes (NED)	(Parkhotel Valkenburg)
Jersey awarded to the sprints classification winner	Sprints	Kirsten Wild (NED)	(WNT–Rotor Pro Cycling)
	Team	(Netherlands) Boels–Dolmans	

The 2019 Boels Rental Ladies Tour also known as the 2019 Holland Ladies Tour was the 22nd edition of the Holland Ladies Tour, a women's cycle stage race held in the Netherlands. The tour was part of the 2019 women's road cycling calendar and was part of the UCI Women's World Tour. It ran from 3 to 8 September 2019.

The race was won by Luxembourgish rider Christine Majerus of the Boels–Dolmans team.

== Stages ==
List of stages
Stage	Date	Course	Distance	Type	Winner
P	3 September	Sittard to Sittard	3.8 km (2.4 mi)	Prologue	Annemiek van Vleuten (NED)
1	4 September	Stramproy to Weert	123.0 km (76.4 mi)	Flat stage	Lorena Wiebes (NED)
2	5 September	Gennep to Gennep	113.7 km (70.6 mi)	Flat stage	Lorena Wiebes (NED)
3	6 September	Nijverdal to Nijverdal	156.8 km (97.4 mi)	Flat stage	Lisa Klein (GER)
4	7 September	Arnhem to Nijmegen	135.6 km (84.3 mi)	Flat stage	Franziska Koch (GER)
5	8 September	Nijmegen to Arnhem	158.8 km (98.7 mi)	Flat stage	Chiara Consonni (ITA)
Total			691.7 km (429.8 mi)		

== Teams ==
Sixteen professional women's teams and one national team entered the race.

Professional women's teams

- Mitchelton–Scott
- Boels–Dolmans
- Trek–Segafredo
- CCC - Liv
- Team Sunweb
- Canyon//SRAM
- WNT–Rotor Pro Cycling
- Team Virtu Cycling
- Valcar–Cylance
- Movistar Team
- Tibco–Silicon Valley Bank
- Parkhotel Valkenburg
- FDJ Nouvelle-Aquitaine Futuroscope
- Bigla Pro Cycling
- Hitec Products–Birk Sport
- Biehler Pro Cycling

National teams:

- Netherlands

== Classification leadership ==
Stage	Winner	General classification	Points classification	Mountain classification	Sprint classification	Young rider classification	Combativity classification	Team classification
P	Annemiek van Vleuten	Annemiek van Vleuten	Annemiek van Vleuten	Lucinda Brand	Leah Kirchmann	Letizia Paternoster	Leah Thomas	Team Sunweb
1	Lorena Wiebes	Annemiek van Vleuten	Letizia Paternoster	Ashleigh Moolman-Pasio	Ashleigh Moolman-Pasio	Lorena Wiebes	Lizzie Deignan	Team Sunweb
2	Lorena Wiebes	Lorena Wiebes	Lorena Wiebes	Kirsten Wild	Kirsten Wild	Lorena Wiebes	Quinty Ton	Team Sunweb
3	Lisa Klein	Lisa Klein	Lorena Wiebes	Alena Amialiusik	Kirsten Wild	Lorena Wiebes	Amalie Dideriksen	Boels-Dolmans
4	Franziska Koch	Christine Majerus	Lorena Wiebes	Christine Majerus	Kirsten Wild	Lorena Wiebes	Riejanne Markus	Boels-Dolmans
5	Chiara Consonni	Christine Majerus	Lorena Wiebes	Lucinda Brand	Kirsten Wild	Lorena Wiebes	Małgorzata Jasińska	Boels-Dolmans
Final Classification		Christine Majerus	Lorena Wiebes	Lucinda Brand	Kirsten Wild	Lorena Wiebes		Boels-Dolmans

== See also ==
- 2019 in women's road cycling
