= Alpes Grésivaudan Classic =

French one-day road cycling race

Race details
- Date: Early June
- Region: Isère, France
- Discipline: Road
- Organiser: Comité d'Organisation du Tour Nord Isère
- Web site: www.alpes-gresivaudan-classic.com

History
- First edition: 2022
- Editions: 5 (as of 2026)
- First winner: Évita Muzic (FRA)
- Most wins: Évita Muzic (FRA) (2 wins)
- Most recent: Talia Appleton (AUS)

The Alpes Grésivaudan Classic is an elite women's professional one-day road bicycle race held annually in the Department of Isère, France. The event was first held in 2022 and is currently rated by the UCI as a 1.1 category race.

== Past winners ==
| Year | Country | Rider | Team |
|---|---|---|---|
| 2022 | France | Évita Muzic | France (national team) |
| 2023 | France | Évita Muzic | France (national team) |
| 2024 | France | Marion Bunel | St. Michel–Mavic–Auber93 |
| 2025 | Austria | Valentina Cavallar | Arkéa–B&B Hotels Women |
| 2026 | Australia | Talia Appleton | Liv AlUla Jayco Women's Continental Team |
