= Margaux Vigié =

French cyclist (born 1995)

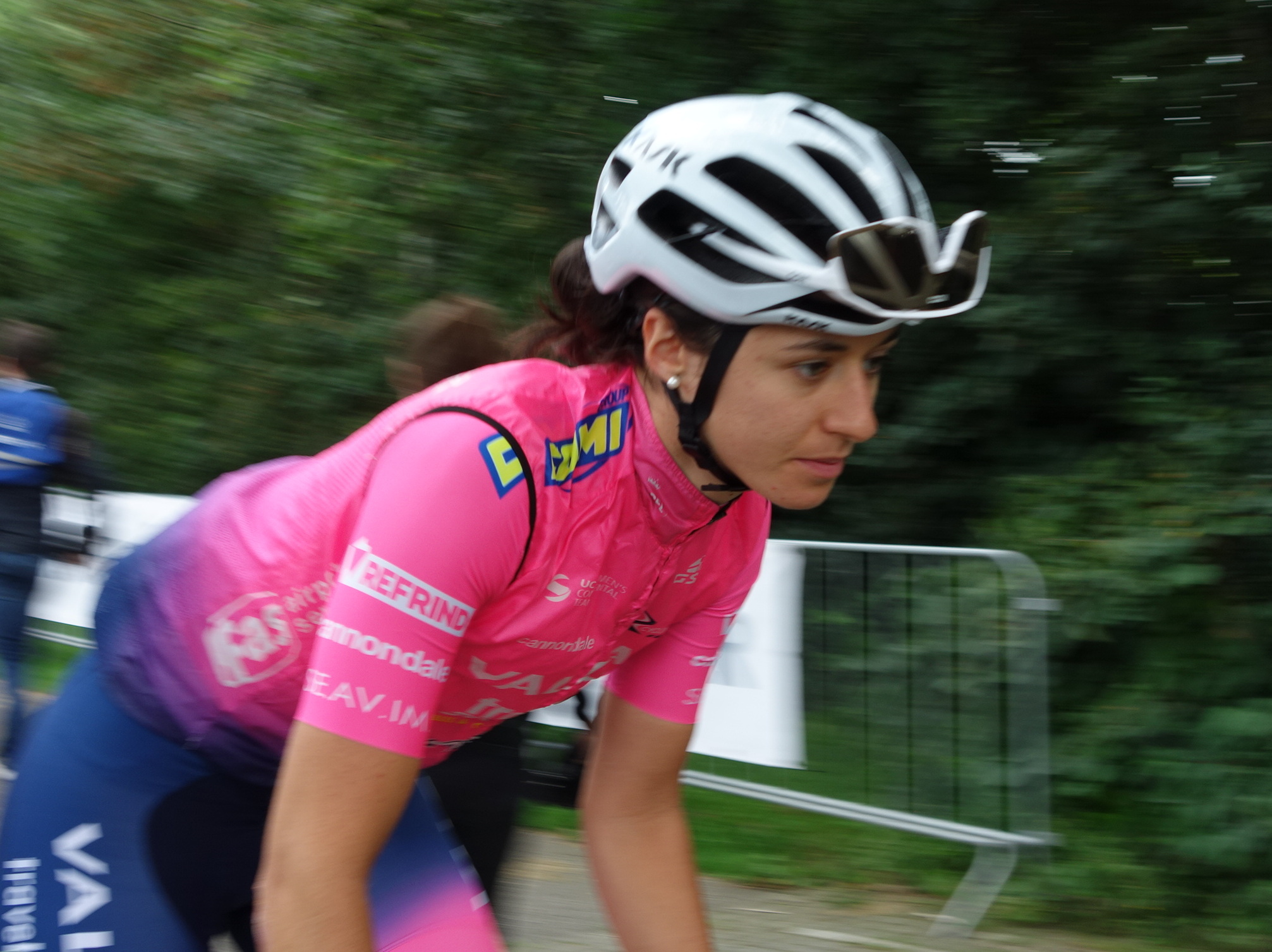
- Vigié in 2021

Personal information
- Born: 21 July 1995 (age 31) Toulouse, France
- Height: 1.71 m (5 ft 7 in)
- Weight: 58 kg (128 lb)

Cycling career
- Sport: Cycling
- Current team: Visma–Lease a Bike
- Discipline: Road
- Role: Rider

Professional teams
- 2020: Cronos–Casa Dorada
- 2020–2022: Valcar–Travel & Service
- 2023: Lifeplus Wahoo
- 2024–: Visma–Lease a Bike

Margaux Vigié (born 21 July 1995) is a French professional racing cyclist, who currently rides for UCI Women's WorldTeam Visma–Lease a Bike.

== Major results ==
2022
4th Road race, National Championships
2023
7th Le Samyn
2024
8th Overall Princess Anna Vasa Tour

1st Stage 1 (TTT)

2025
2nd Kreiz Breizh Elites Féminin
3rd Tour de Gatineau
3rd Chrono Féminin de Gatineau
4th Overall Baloise Ladies Tour
5th Overall Simac Ladies Tour
