= Quinty Ton =

Dutch cyclist (born 1998)

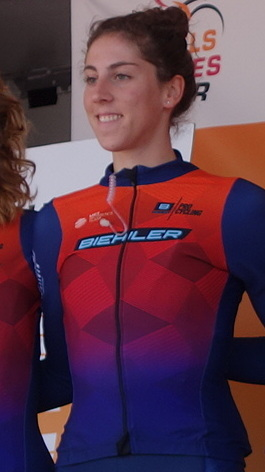
- Ton at the 2019 Holland Ladies Tour

Personal information
- Full name: Quinty Ton
- Born: 4 August 1998 (age 28) Tiel, Netherlands

Cycling career
- Sport: Cycling
- Current team: Liv AlUla Jayco
- Discipline: Road
- Role: Rider

Professional teams
- 2019–2021: Biehler Pro Cycling
- 2022–2023: Liv Racing TeqFind
- 2024–: Liv AlUla Jayco

Quinty Ton (born 4 August 1998) is a Dutch professional racing cyclist, who currently rides for UCI Women's WorldTeam Liv AlUla Jayco.

== Major results ==
2021
7th Overall Belgrade GP Woman Tour
8th Binche Chimay Binche pour Dames
2023
7th Omloop Het Nieuwsblad
2024
8th La Classique Morbihan
2025
7th GP Oetingen
9th Amstel Gold Race
