= Talia Appleton =

Australian cyclist (born 2005)

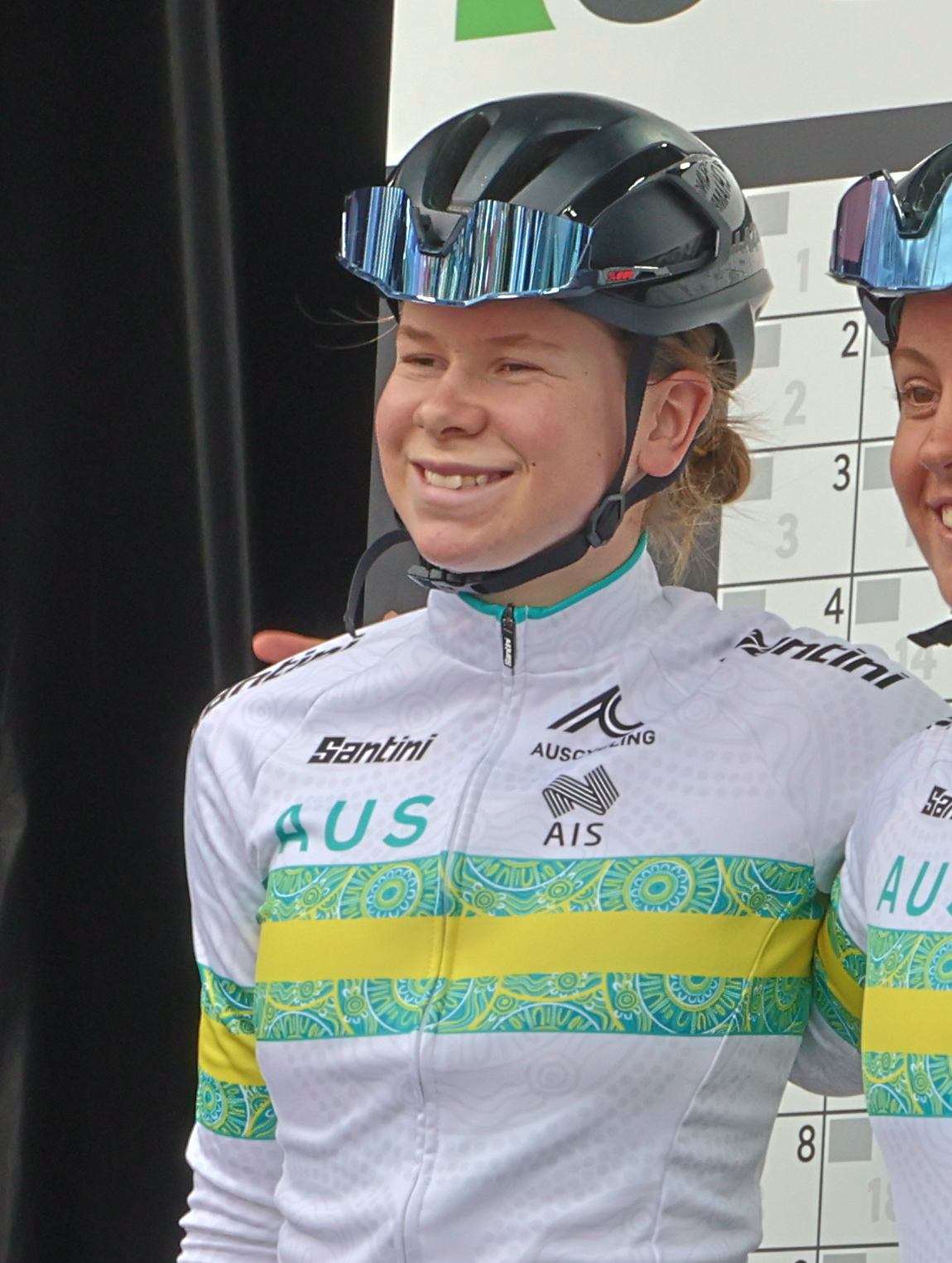
- Appleton at the 2023 UCI Road World Championships

Personal information
- Born: 24 October 2005 (age 20) Auckland, New Zealand

Cycling career
- Sport: Cycling
- Current team: Liv AlUla Jayco
- Discipline: Road
- Role: Rider
- Rider type: Climber

Amateur teams
- 2023–2024: Team BridgeLane
- 2025: Praties Cycling Team

Professional teams
- 2026: Liv AlUla Jayco Women's Continental Team
- 2026–: Liv AlUla Jayco

Major wins
- One-day races and Classics Alpes Grésivaudan Classic (2026)
Medal record
Representing Australia
Women's road cycling
Oceania Championships
Gold medal – first place	2023 Queensland	Junior road race
Silver medal – second place	2024 Queensland	Under-23 time trial

Talia Appleton (born 24 October 2005) is an Australian professional road cyclist who rides for Liv AlUla Jayco. A climbing specialist, she won her first professional race at the 2026 Alpes Grésivaudan Classic.

== Career ==
Appleton started road cycling at age 10, also pursuing other sports such as swimming until 15. A successful junior, she won the junior road race at the 2023 Oceania Cycling Championships.

In 2025, Appleton finished top-3 in Australia's ProVelo Super League, helping her to land a contracy with Liv AlUla Jayco. She was promoted from Liv AlUla Jayco's continental squad to its WorldTeam in May 2026, signing through to the end of the 2027 season. She is considered primarily a climbing specialist.

== Major results ==
2022
3rd Road race, National Junior Championships
Oceania Junior Championships

4th Road race
5th Time trial

2023
Oceania Junior Championships

1st Road race
7th Time trial

National Junior Championships

3rd Road race
3rd Time trial

2024
2nd Time trial, Oceania Under-23 Championships
9th Road race, Oceania Championships
2025
3rd Overall Tour de l'Avenir Femmes
4th Time trial, National Under-23 Championships
9th Road race, UCI World Under-23 Championships
2026
1st Alpes Grésivaudan Classic
3rd Overall Vuelta a Extremadura Femenina
7th Clásica de Almería
7th Grand Prix Féminin de Chambéry
