= Princess Anna Vasa Tour =

Race details
- Date: July
- Region: Poland
- Discipline: Road
- Type: Race stage
- Web site: pavtour.eu

History
- First edition: 2022
- Editions: 3 (as of 2024)
- First winner: Agnieszka Skalniak-Sójka (POL)
- Most wins: No repeat winners
- Most recent: Lieke Nooijen (NED)

Princess Anna Vasa Tour is a Stage race cycling race, held annually in Poland. It is rated 2.2.

The race is named after Anna Vasa of Sweden.

== Winners ==
Year	Country	Rider	Team
2022	Poland	Agnieszka Skalniak-Sójka	ATOM Deweloper Posciellux.pl Wrocław
2023	Ukraine	Valeriya Kononenko	Ukraine
2024	Netherlands	Lieke Nooijen	Visma–Lease a Bike
