= Letizia Borghesi =

Italian cyclist (born 1998)

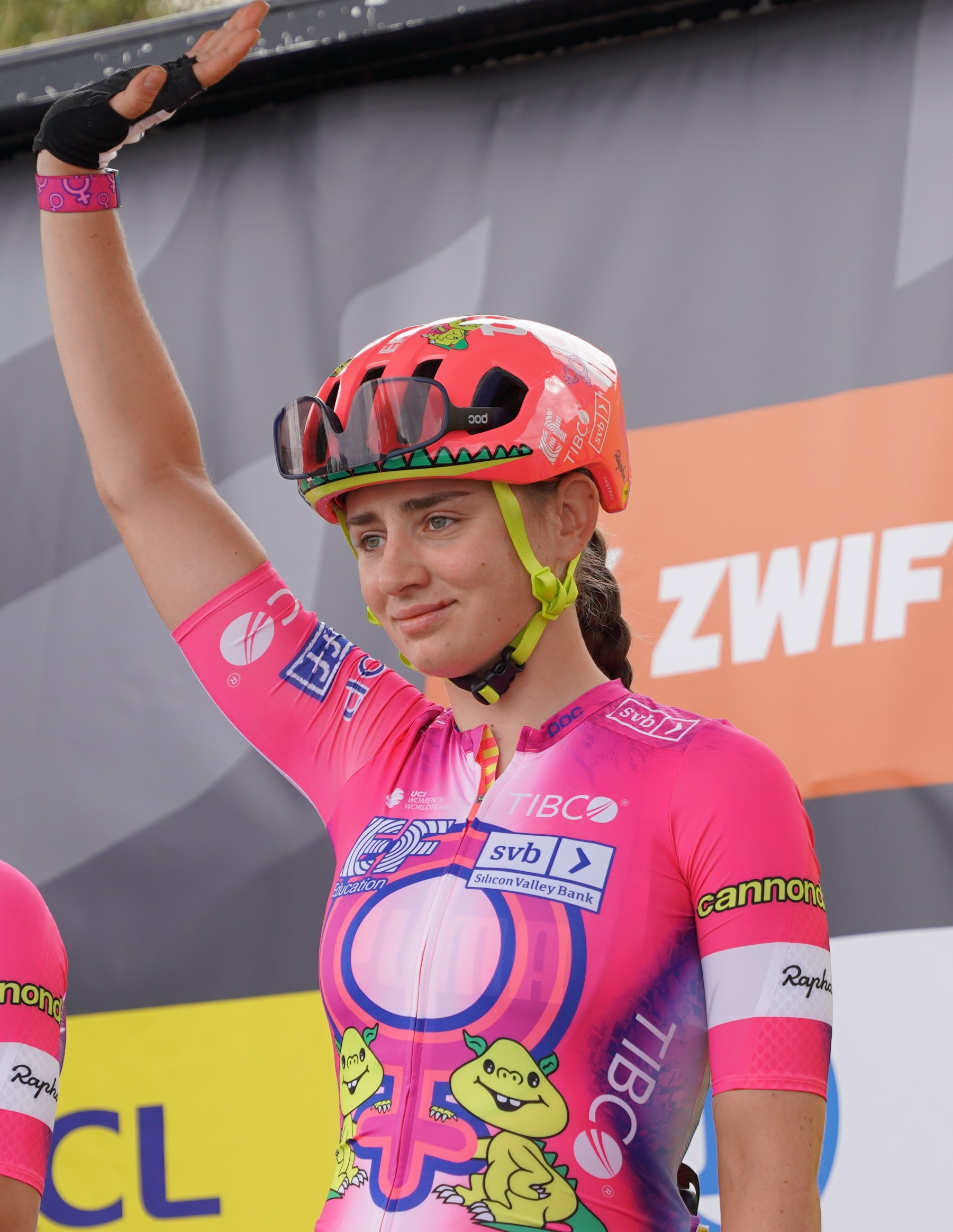
- Borghesi at the 2022 Tour de France Femmes

Personal information
- Full name: Letizia Borghesi
- Born: 16 October 1998 (age 28) Cles, Italy

Cycling career
- Sport: Cycling
- Current team: AG Insurance–Soudal
- Disciplines: Road; Cyclo-cross
- Role: Rider

Professional teams
- 2017: Servetto Giusta
- 2018: Bepink
- 2019–2021: Aromitalia–Basso Bikes–Vaiano
- 2022–2023: EF Education–Tibco–SVB
- 2024–2025: EF Education–Cannondale
- 2026: AG Insurance–Soudal

Major wins
- Grand Tours Giro d'Italia Femminile 1 individual stage (2019)

Letizia Borghesi (born 16 October 1998) is an Italian professional racing cyclist, who currently rides for the UCI Women's ProTeam AG Insurance–Soudal. She previously rode for the UCI Women's ProTeam EF Education–Oatly. Her younger sister Giada is also a professional cyclist.

== Major results ==
2017
4th Overall Vuelta a Colombia
2019
1st Stage 4 Giro Rosa
7th Brabantse Pijl
9th Overall Setmana Ciclista Valenciana
2022
8th Scheldeprijs
9th Nokere Koerse
2023
7th Dwars door het Hageland
8th Clásica de Almería
9th Dwars door de Westhoek
2024
5th Dwars door het Hageland
5th Road race, National Road Championships
8th Kreiz Breizh Elites
8th Classic Lorient Agglomération
8th Grand Prix de Wallonie
9th Trofeo Palma Femina
9th Durango-Durango Emakumeen Saria
9th Overall Thüringen Ladies Tour
10th Grand Prix International d'Isbergues
2025
2nd Paris–Roubaix
6th Tour of Flanders
7th Clásica de Almería
2026
1st stage 4 Eneco Tour Women
