= Femke Markus =

Dutch cyclist (born 1996)

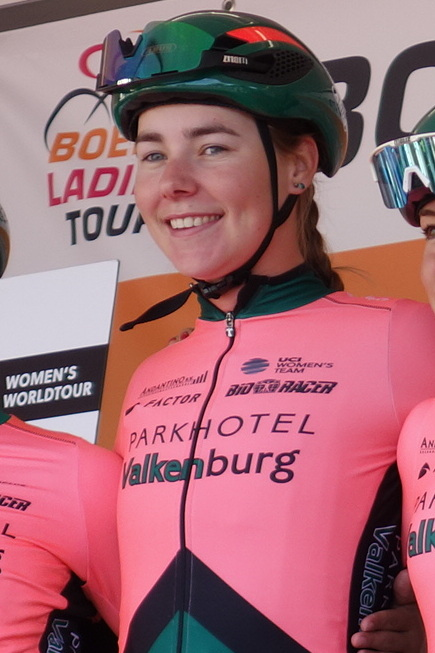
- Markus at the 2019 Holland Ladies Tour

Personal information
- Full name: Femke Markus
- Born: 17 November 1996 (age 29)

Cycling career
- Sport: Cycling
- Current team: Team SD Worx–Protime
- Discipline: Road
- Role: Rider

Professional teams
- 2019–2022: Parkhotel Valkenburg
- 2023–: SD Worx

Femke Markus (pronounced [ˈfɛmkə ˈmɑrkʏs]; born 17 November 1996) is a Dutch professional racing cyclist. She is a younger sister of Riejanne Markus, but they are not related to Barry Markus and his sister Kelly Markus.

In 2023 Markus and Mischa Bredewold left Parkhotel Valkenburg to join team SD Worx.

== Major results ==
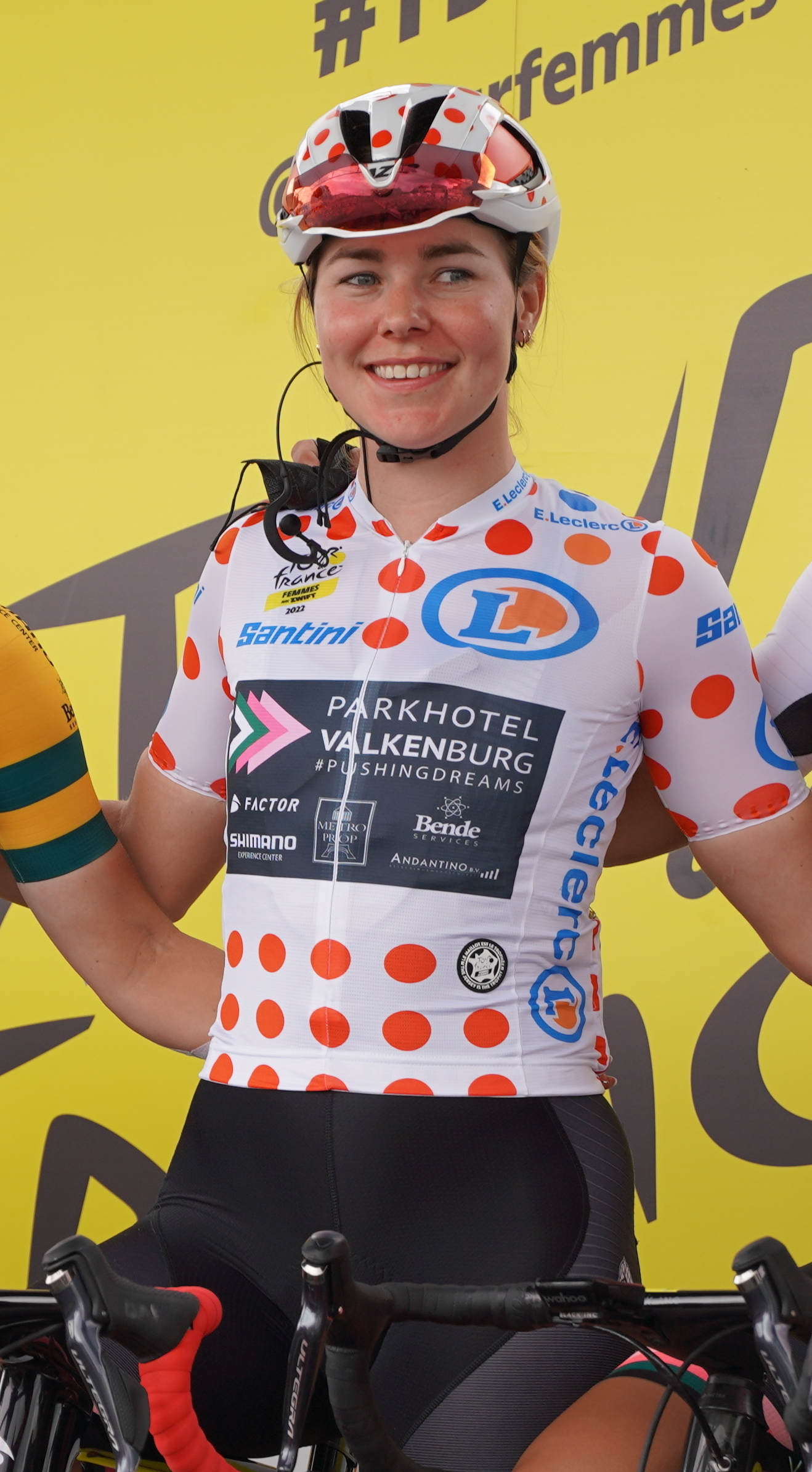
Tour de France 2022.

2022
1st Leiedal Koerse
3rd La Classique Morbihan
3rd Dwars door het Hageland
4th Omloop van Borsele
8th Overall Belgium Tour
Tour de France

Held after Stages 1–2

2026
1st Antwerp Port Epic
