= Lieke Nooijen =

Dutch cyclist

- Nooijen in 2023

Personal information
- Born: 20 July 2001 (age 25) Helmond, Netherlands
- Height: 1.83 m (6 ft 0 in)

Cycling career
- Sport: Cycling
- Current team: Visma–Lease a Bike
- Discipline: Road
- Role: Rider

Amateur team
- 2020: WV Schijndel

Professional teams
- 2021–2023: Parkhotel Valkenburg
- 2024–: Visma–Lease a Bike

Major wins
- One-day races and Classics National Road Race Championships (2026)
Medal record
Men's road bicycle racing
Representing Netherlands
World Championships
Bronze medal – third place	2019 Yorkshire	Junior road race

Lieke Nooijen (born 20 July 2001) is a Dutch professional racing cyclist, who currently rides for UCI Women's WorldTeam Visma–Lease a Bike.

== Major results ==
2018
8th Gent–Wevelgem Juniors
2019
3rd Road race, UCI Junior Road World Championships
5th Time trial, National Junior Road Championships
5th Overall Healthy Ageing Tour Junior
2021
7th Overall Baloise Ladies Tour
2022
3rd Overall Watersley Women's Challenge
7th Diamond Tour
7th Omloop van Borsele
2023
1st Argenta Classic-2 Districtenpijl
3rd Leiedal Koerse
4th Dwars door het Hageland
5th Le Samyn des Dames
6th Overall Watersley Women's Challenge

1st Prologue

2024
1st Overall Princess Anna Vasa Tour

1st Points classification
1st Stages 1 (TTT), 3 & 4 (ITT)

1st Egmont Cycling Race
2nd Time trial, National Road Championships
10th Veenendaal–Veenendaal Classic
2026
1st Road race, National Championships
1st Eneco Tour

1st Prologue and Stage 2

3rd Dwars door Vlaanderen
