= 2023 Tour of Flanders (women's race) =

Cycling race

2023 Ronde van Vlaanderen Elite Vrouwen
2023 UCI Women's World Tour, race 10 of 27
- Event poster with previous winners Mathieu van der Poel and Lotte Kopecky

Race details
- Dates: 2 April 2023
- Stages: 1
- Distance: 156.6 km (97.3 mi)
- Winning time: 4h 06' 11"

Results
	Winner	Lotte Kopecky (BEL)	(SD Worx)
	Second	Demi Vollering (NED)	(SD Worx)
	Third	Elisa Longo Borghini (ITA)	(Trek–Segafredo)

The 2023 Ronde van Vlaanderen was a Belgian road cycling one-day race that took place on 2 April 2023. It was the 20th edition of Tour of Flanders for Women and the 10th event of the 2023 UCI Women's World Tour.

The race was won by Belgian rider Lotte Kopecky of SD Worx for the second year running, after a solo attack with around 20 kilometres remaining.

== Route ==
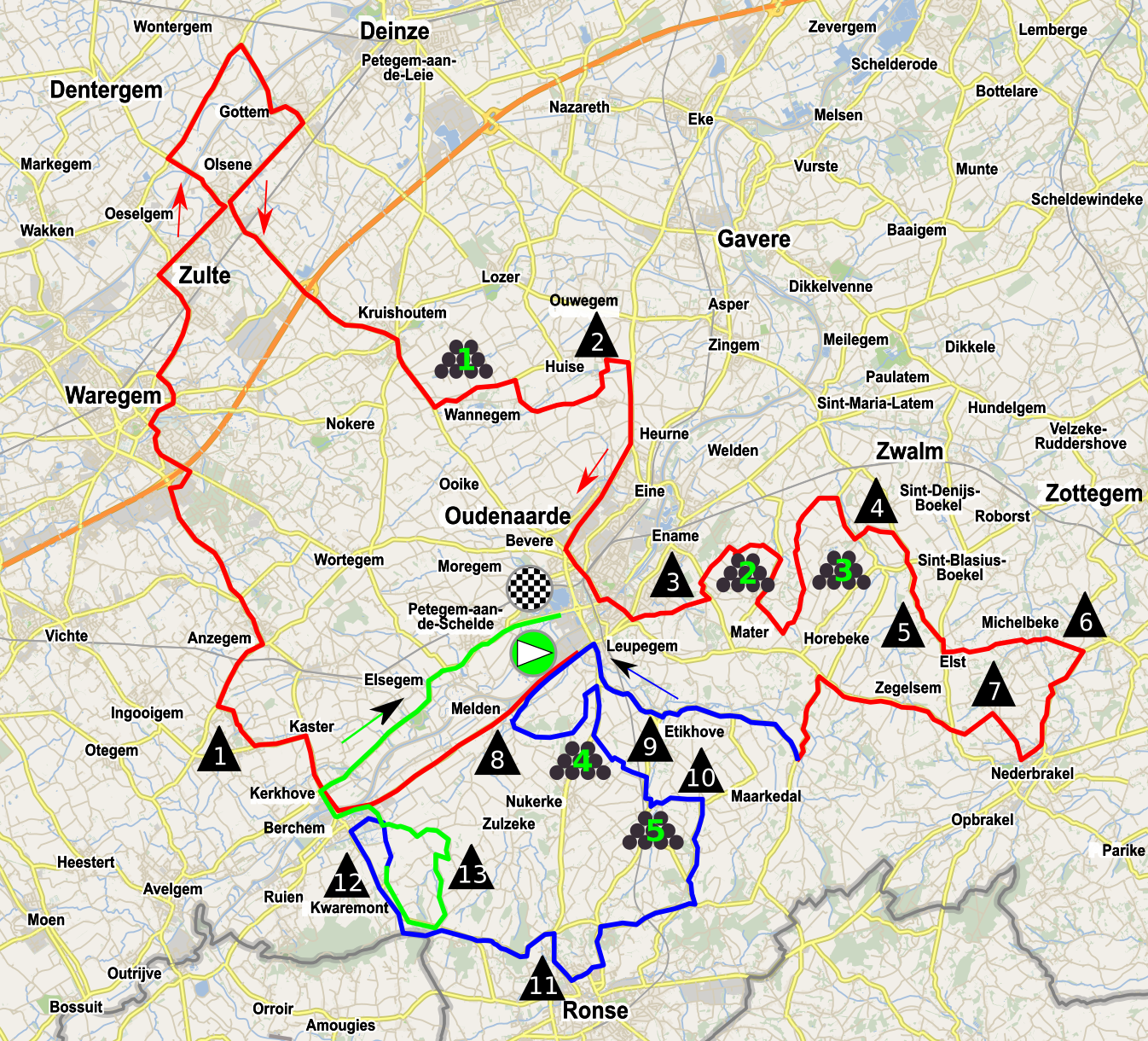
Course map of Ronde van Vlaanderen 2023

The race was held over a 156.6 kilometres (97.3 mi) course starting and finishing in Oudenaarde, with thirteen climbs and five cobbled sectors. The first half of the route was different to recent editions, heading north from Oudenaarde. The latter half of the race is similar to previous editions, with the last 45 kilometres (28 mi) identical to the men's race. That last section took in two cobbled sectors and six climbs - including the famed Koppenberg (600m at 9.7%), Oude Kwaremont (2 km at 4.4%) and Paterberg (400m at 10%) climbs.

== Summary ==
In the run up to the event, SD Worx had won Ronde van Drenthe, Gent–Wevelgem and Dwars door Vlaanderen - and therefore teammates Demi Vollering, Marlen Reusser and Lotte Kopecky were considered favourites. Kopecky had also won the 2022 edition of the race. Other contenders included two-time winner Annemiek van Vleuten of Movistar Team, Elisa Longo Borghini of Trek–Segafredo and winner of Classic Brugge–De Panne, Pfeiffer Georgi of Team DSM.

The initial part of the race was quiet, with a break forming with 90 kilometres remaining. Annemiek van Vleuten crashed, ending the possibility of a third Tour of Flanders win at her final attempt at the race.

The break was caught at the bottom of the Koppenberg climb, with only Reusser and Silvia Persico of UAE Team ADQ able to complete the cycle to the top. Kopecky caused a chain reaction by having to step off her bike, delaying the majority of the peloton behind. Only Kopecky and Lorena Wiebes were able to remount fast enough to be able to catch Reusser and Persico. This immediately formed a group of four contenders, with a larger chase group behind including Vollering, Katarzyna Niewiadoma of Canyon–SRAM, Shirin van Anrooij of Trek–Segafredo and Juliette Labous of Team DSM.

The three SD Worx teammates (Kopecky, Reusser and Wiebes) then worked together to gain a gap, gaining 28 seconds over the larger chase group by the top of the Taaienberg climb. After the Kruisberg climb, both Wiebes and Reusser had been dropped. On the Oude Kwaremont climb with 18 kilometres to go, Kopecky attacked Persico and went clear towards the finish, gaining over 30 seconds. A chase group behind of van Anrooij, Persico, Niewiadoma and Vollering realised that they could not catch Kopecky, and Reusser, Labous and Longo Borghini joined them.

Lotte Kopecky crossed the finish line in Oudenaarde for the second year running, winning by 38 seconds. She became the second rider after Mirjam Melchers to win two consecutive editions. In the sprint for second place, Vollering made it an SD Worx 1-2 finish, with Longo Borghini in third place. Wiebes maintained the leaders jersey of the UCI Women's World Tour.

== Result ==
Result
Rank	Rider	Team	Time
1	Lotte Kopecky (BEL)	SD Worx	4h 06' 11"
2	Demi Vollering (NED)	SD Worx	+ 36"
3	Elisa Longo Borghini (ITA)	Trek–Segafredo	+ 36"
4	Silvia Persico (ITA)	UAE Team ADQ	+ 36"
5	Katarzyna Niewiadoma (POL)	Canyon//SRAM	+ 36"
6	Juliette Labous (FRA)	Team DSM	+ 36"
7	Marlen Reusser (SUI)	SD Worx	+ 36"
8	Shirin van Anrooij (NED)	Trek–Segafredo	+ 44"
9	Anna Henderson (GBR)	Team Jumbo–Visma	+ 2' 40"
10	Arlenis Sierra (CUB)	Movistar Team	+ 3' 38"

== See also ==
- 2023 in women's road cycling
