= 2023 UCI Women's World Tour =

Series of women's road cycling races

- Eighth edition of the UCI Women's World Tour

Details
- Dates: 15 January – 17 October 2023
- Location: Europe; Oceania; Asia
- Races: 27

Champions
- Individual champion: Demi Vollering (SD Worx)
- Teams' champion: SD Worx

The 2023 UCI Women's World Tour was a competition that included twenty-seven road cycling events throughout the 2023 women's cycling season. It was the eighth edition of the UCI Women's World Tour, the ranking system launched by the Union Cycliste Internationale (UCI) in 2016. The competition began with the Women's Tour Down Under from 15 to 17 January, and finished with the Tour of Guangxi on 17 October.

Dutch rider Demi Vollering (SD Worx) won the individual classification with 4891.86 points, leading the classification for the majority of the season. She had seven overall victories, including winning all three Ardennes classics, as well as the second edition of Tour de France Femmes.

Second place went to Belgian rider Lotte Kopecky (SD Worx), with 2735 points, over 2000 points behind Vollering. She won three events including the Tour of Flanders. Third place was taken by Swiss rider Marlen Reusser (SD Worx) with 2512.86 points, after winning three events. Sixteen different riders won races, with five riders holding the individual classification lead during the season.

As in previous years, the teams classification was won by SD Worx – their seventh win in eight seasons, with the top three places in the overall classification all being SD Worx riders. For the second year running, the youth classification was won by Dutch rider Shirin van Anrooij (Lidl–Trek), who finished 11th in the individual classification.

== Events ==
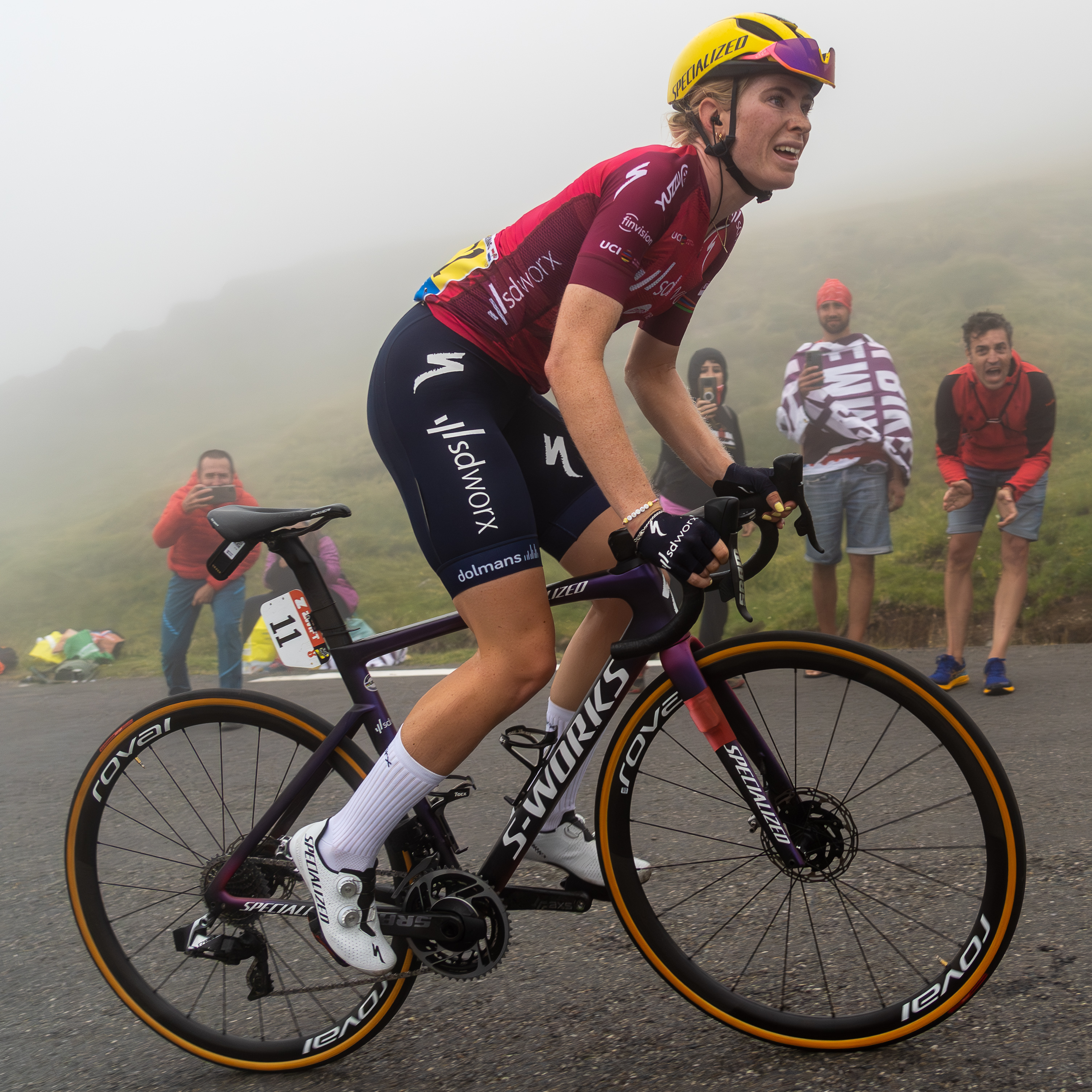
Demi Vollering (pictured at the Tour de France Femmes) won the overall classification, with her team SD Worx winning the team classification

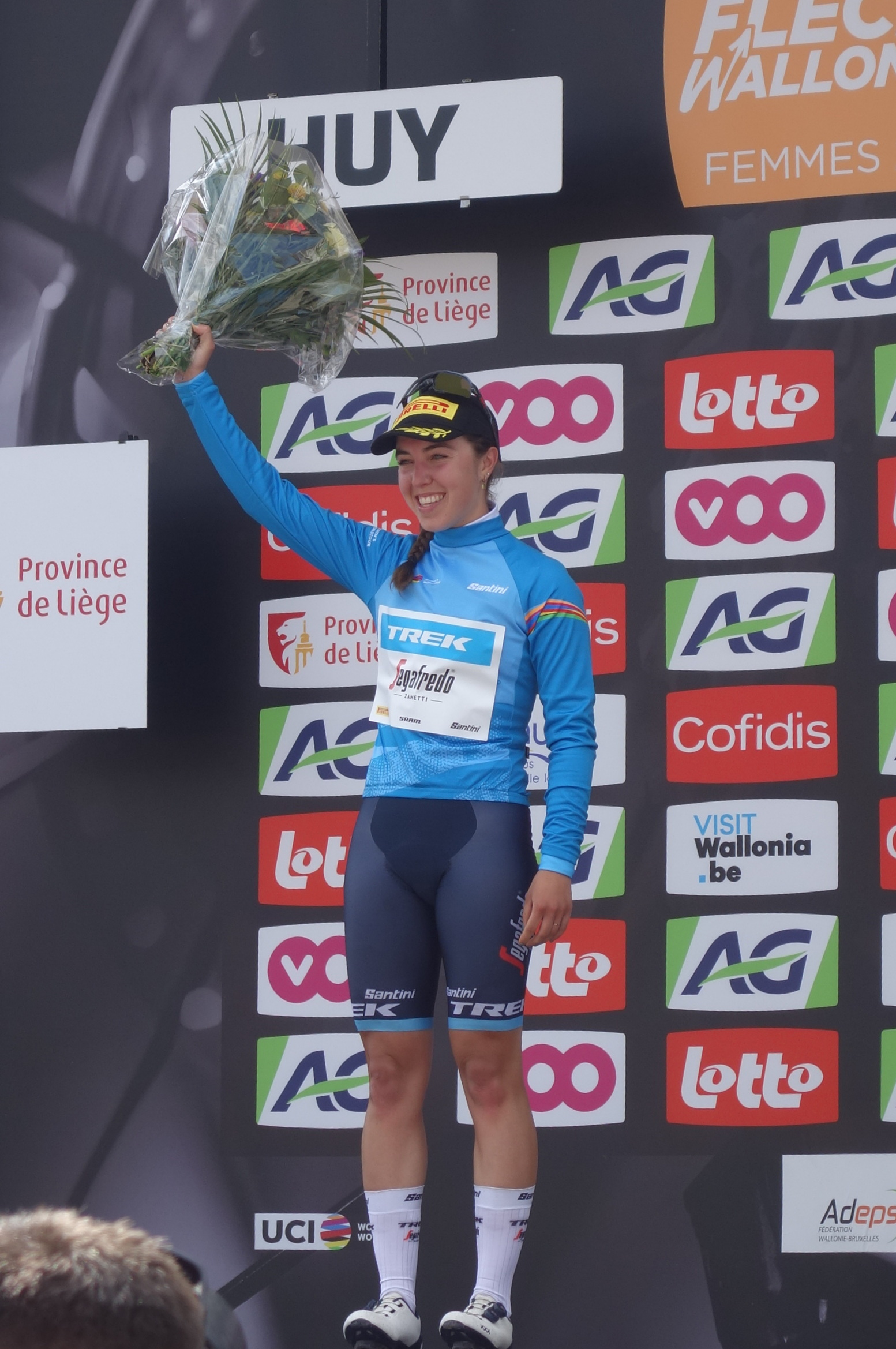
Shirin van Anrooij (pictured at La Flèche Wallonne Femmes) won the youth classification

The race calendar for the 2023 season was announced in June 2022, with thirty races initially scheduled, up from twenty-three that were held in 2022. The calendar featured several new races including the Women's Tour Down Under, Omloop Het Nieuwsblad and La Vuelta Femenina. Races outside Europe returned for the first time since 2020, with two races in Australia, two races in China and one race in the United Arab Emirates.

2023 UCI Women's World Tour
Race	Date	First	Second	Third	Leader
(Australia) Women's Tour Down Under	15–17 January	Grace Brown (AUS)	Amanda Spratt (AUS)	Georgia Williams (NZL)	Grace Brown (AUS)
(Australia) Cadel Evans Great Ocean Road Race	28 January	Loes Adegeest (NED)	Amanda Spratt (AUS)	Nina Buijsman (NED)	Amanda Spratt (AUS)
(United Arab Emirates) UAE Tour	9–12 February	Elisa Longo Borghini (ITA)	Gaia Realini (ITA)	Silvia Persico (ITA)	Amanda Spratt (AUS)
(Belgium) Omloop Het Nieuwsblad	25 February	Lotte Kopecky (BEL)	Lorena Wiebes (NED)	Marta Bastianelli (ITA)	Amanda Spratt (AUS)
(Italy) Strade Bianche Donne	4 March	Demi Vollering (NED)	Lotte Kopecky (BEL)	Cecilie Uttrup Ludwig (DEN)	Amanda Spratt (AUS)
(Netherlands) Ronde van Drenthe	11 March	Lorena Wiebes (NED)	Susanne Andersen (NOR)	Maike van der Duin (NED)	Lorena Wiebes (NED)
(Italy) Trofeo Alfredo Binda-Comune di Cittiglio	19 March	Shirin van Anrooij (NED)	Elisa Balsamo (ITA)	Vittoria Guazzini (ITA)	Lorena Wiebes (NED)
(Belgium) Classic Brugge–De Panne	23 March	Pfeiffer Georgi (GBR)	Elisa Balsamo (ITA)	Lorena Wiebes (NED)	Lorena Wiebes (NED)
(Belgium) Gent–Wevelgem	26 March	Marlen Reusser (SUI)	Megan Jastrab (USA)	Maike van der Duin (NED)	Lorena Wiebes (NED)
(Belgium) Tour of Flanders	2 April	Lotte Kopecky (BEL)	Demi Vollering (NED)	Elisa Longo Borghini (ITA)	Lorena Wiebes (NED)
(France) Paris–Roubaix Femmes	8 April	Alison Jackson (CAN)	Katia Ragusa (ITA)	Marthe Truyen (BEL)	Lotte Kopecky (BEL)
(Netherlands) Amstel Gold Race	16 April	Demi Vollering (NED)	Lotte Kopecky (BEL)	Shirin van Anrooij (NED)	Lotte Kopecky (BEL)
(Belgium) La Flèche Wallonne Femmes	19 April	Demi Vollering (NED)	Liane Lippert (GER)	Gaia Realini (ITA)	Lotte Kopecky (BEL)
(Belgium) Liège–Bastogne–Liège Femmes	23 April	Demi Vollering (NED)	Elisa Longo Borghini (ITA)	Marlen Reusser (SUI)	Demi Vollering (NED)
(Spain) La Vuelta Femenina	1–7 May	Annemiek van Vleuten (NED)	Demi Vollering (NED)	Gaia Realini (ITA)	Demi Vollering (NED)
(Spain) Itzulia Women	12–14 May	Marlen Reusser (SUI)	Demi Vollering (NED)	Katarzyna Niewiadoma (POL)	Demi Vollering (NED)
(Spain) Vuelta a Burgos Feminas	18–21 May	Demi Vollering (NED)	Shirin van Anrooij (NED)	Ashleigh Moolman Pasio (RSA)	Demi Vollering (NED)
(United Kingdom) RideLondon Classique	26–28 May	Charlotte Kool (NED)	Chloé Dygert (USA)	Lizzie Deignan (GBR)	Demi Vollering (NED)
(Switzerland) Tour de Suisse Women	17–20 June	Marlen Reusser (SUI)	Demi Vollering (NED)	Elisa Longo Borghini (ITA)	Demi Vollering (NED)
(Italy) Giro Donne	30 June – 9 July	Annemiek van Vleuten (NED)	Juliette Labous (FRA)	Gaia Realini (ITA)	Demi Vollering (NED)
Tour de France Femmes	23–30 July	Demi Vollering (NED)	Lotte Kopecky (BEL)	Katarzyna Niewiadoma (POL)	Demi Vollering (NED)
(Norway) / (Denmark) Tour of Scandinavia	23–27 August	Annemiek van Vleuten (NED)	Cecilie Uttrup Ludwig (DEN)	Amber Kraak (NED)	Demi Vollering (NED)
(France) Classic Lorient Agglomération	2 September	Mischa Bredewold (NED)	Marta Lach (POL)	Sofia Bertizzolo (ITA)	Demi Vollering (NED)
(Netherlands) Simac Ladies Tour	5–10 September	Lotte Kopecky (BEL)	Lorena Wiebes (NED)	Anna Henderson (GBR)	Demi Vollering (NED)
(Switzerland) Tour de Romandie Féminin	15–17 September	Demi Vollering (NED)	Katarzyna Niewiadoma (POL)	Marlen Reusser (SUI)	Demi Vollering (NED)
(China) Tour of Chongming Island	12–14 October	Chiara Consonni (ITA)	Mylène de Zoete (NED)	Daria Pikulik (POL)	Demi Vollering (NED)
(China) Tour of Guangxi	17 October	Daria Pikulik (POL)	Chiara Consonni (ITA)	Mia Griffin (IRL)	Demi Vollering (NED)

=== Race cancellations ===
In January, the Vårgårda Cykelklubb ceased the organisation of the Vårgårda West Sweden races due to economic reasons, reducing the calendar to twenty-eight races. In March, SweetSpot announced that the 2023 edition of The Women's Tour had been cancelled due to financial reasons (20% higher costs than 2022, and loss of key sponsors). This reduced the calendar to twenty-seven races.

== Changes for 2023 ==
The number of riders allowed per team was changed – stage races longer than five stages had seven riders and two team support vehicles. For shorter events, organisers were able to decide whether to have six or seven riders per team.

The minimum salary per rider was increased, with an additional category for new professional ("neo-pro") riders.

== 2023 UCI Women's WorldTeams ==
The fifteen Women's WorldTeams were automatically invited to compete in events, with the two best 2022 UCI Women's Continental Teams (Ceratizit–WNT Pro Cycling and Lifeplus Wahoo) also invited automatically. Other Continental women's teams were invited by the organisers of each race.

- Canyon//SRAM
- EF Education–Tibco–SVB
- FDJ–Suez
- Fenix–Deceuninck
- Human Powered Health
- Israel Premier Tech Roland
- Lidl–Trek
- Liv Racing TeqFind
- Movistar Team
- Team dsm–firmenich
- Team Jayco–AlUla
- Team Jumbo–Visma
- SD Worx
- UAE Team ADQ
- Uno-X Pro Cycling Team
