= 2023 Holland Ladies Tour =

Women's road cycling stage race in the Netherlands

2023 UCI Women's World Tour, race 24 of 27

Race details
- Dates: 5–10 September
- Stages: 5 + Prologue
- Distance: 579.4 km (360.0 mi)
- Winning time: 14h 27' 50"

Results
Jersey awarded to the overall winner	Winner	Lotte Kopecky (BEL)	(SD Worx)
	Second	Lorena Wiebes (NED)	(SD Worx)
	Third	Anna Henderson (GBR)	(Team Jumbo–Visma)
Jersey awarded to the points classification winner	Points	Lorena Wiebes (NED)	(SD Worx)
Jersey awarded to the mountains classification winner	Mountains	Karlijn Swinkels (NED)	(Team Jumbo–Visma)
Jersey awarded to the young rider classification winner	Young rider	Zoe Bäckstedt (GBR)	(Canyon//SRAM)
	Team	(United States) Lidl–Trek	

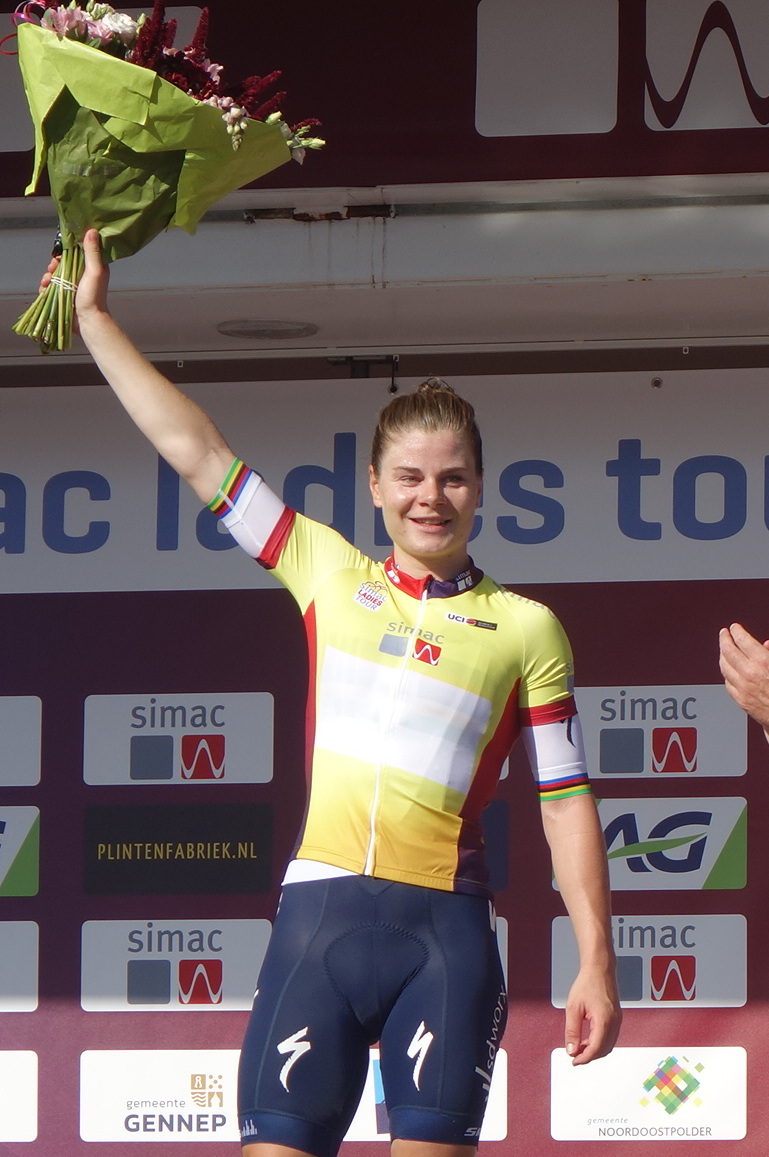
World Champion Lotte Kopecky on the podium after the 4th stage of the Simac Ladies Tour, September 9, 2023.

The 2023 Holland Ladies Tour, also known as the 2023 Simac Ladies Tour, was a road cycling stage race that took place in the Netherlands between 5 and 10 September 2023. It was the 25th edition of the Holland Ladies Tour, and part of the 2023 UCI Women's World Tour.

== Teams ==
14 of 15 UCI Women's WorldTeams (all except EF Education–Tibco–SVB) and six UCI Women's Continental Teams made up the 18 teams that participated in the Tour. A total of 120 riders started the race.

UCI Women's WorldTeams

- SD Worx
- Movistar Team
- Team Jumbo–Visma
- Canyon//SRAM
- Fenix–Deceuninck
- Israel Premier Tech Roland
- Lidl–Trek
- Liv Racing TeqFind
- Team dsm–firmenich
- Team Jayco–AlUla
- UAE Team ADQ
- Uno-X Pro Cycling Team

UCI Women's Continental Teams

- Ceratizit–WNT Pro Cycling
- Lifeplus Wahoo
- AG Insurance–Soudal–Quick-Step
- GT Krush Rebellease Pro Cycling
- Parkhotel Valkenburg
- Lotto–Dstny Ladies

== Route ==
Stage characteristics and winners
Stage	Date	Course	Distance	Type	Stage winner
Prologue	5 September	Ede to Ede	2.4 km (1.5 mi)	Individual time trial	Charlotte Kool (NED)
1	6 September	Gennep to Gennep	139.1 km (86.4 mi)	Flat stage	Elisa Balsamo (ITA)
2	7 September	Leuven to Leuven	7.1 km (4.4 mi)	Individual time trial	Lotte Kopecky (BEL)
3	8 September	Emmeloord to Lelystad	148.9 km (92.5 mi)	Flat stage	Charlotte Kool (NED)
4	9 September	Valkenburg to Valkenburg	131.6 km (81.8 mi)	Hilly stage	Lotte Kopecky (BEL)
5	10 September	Arnhem to Arnhem	150.3 km (93.4 mi)	Hilly stage	Lorena Wiebes (NED)
Total			579.4 km (360.0 mi)		

== Stages ==
=== Prologue ===
5 September 2023 – Ede to Ede, 2.4 km (1.5 mi)

Prologue Result
Rank	Rider	Team	Time
1	Charlotte Kool (NED)	Team dsm–firmenich	3' 04"
2	Riejanne Markus (NED)	Team Jumbo–Visma	+ 4"
3	Lotte Kopecky (BEL)	SD Worx	+ 4"
4	Lorena Wiebes (NED)	SD Worx	+ 5"
5	Demi Vollering (NED)	SD Worx	+ 6"
6	Anna Henderson (GBR)	Team Jumbo–Visma	+ 7"
7	Maike van der Duin (NED)	Canyon//SRAM	+ 7"
8	Elisa Balsamo (ITA)	Lidl–Trek	+ 8"
9	Zoe Bäckstedt (GBR)	Canyon//SRAM	+ 8"
10	Pfeiffer Georgi (GBR)	Team dsm–firmenich	+ 8"

General classification after Prologue
Rank	Rider	Team	Time
1	Charlotte Kool (NED)	Team dsm–firmenich	3' 04"
2	Riejanne Markus (NED)	Team Jumbo–Visma	+ 4"
3	Lotte Kopecky (BEL)	SD Worx	+ 4"
4	Lorena Wiebes (NED)	SD Worx	+ 5"
5	Demi Vollering (NED)	SD Worx	+ 6"
6	Anna Henderson (GBR)	Team Jumbo–Visma	+ 7"
7	Maike van der Duin (NED)	Canyon//SRAM	+ 7"
8	Elisa Balsamo (ITA)	Lidl–Trek	+ 8"
9	Zoe Bäckstedt (GBR)	Canyon//SRAM	+ 8"
10	Pfeiffer Georgi (GBR)	Team dsm–firmenich	+ 8"

=== Stage 1 ===
6 September 2023 – Gennep to Gennep, 139.1 km (86.4 mi)

Stage 1 Result
Rank	Rider	Team	Time
1	Elisa Balsamo (ITA)	Lidl–Trek	3h 28' 45"
2	Lorena Wiebes (NED)	SD Worx	+ 0"
3	Charlotte Kool (NED)	Team dsm–firmenich	+ 0"
4	Arlenis Sierra (CUB)	Movistar Team	+ 0"
5	Maria Giulia Confalonieri (ITA)	Uno-X Pro Cycling Team	+ 0"
6	Letizia Paternoster (ITA)	Team Jayco–AlUla	+ 0"
7	Maike van der Duin (NED)	Canyon//SRAM	+ 0"
8	Chiara Consonni (ITA)	UAE Team ADQ	+ 0"
9	Anna Henderson (GBR)	Team Jumbo–Visma	+ 0"
10	Ilaria Sanguineti (ITA)	Lidl–Trek	+ 0"

General classification after Stage 1
Rank	Rider	Team	Time
1	Charlotte Kool (NED)	Team dsm–firmenich	3h 31' 45"
2	Elisa Balsamo (ITA)	Lidl–Trek	+ 2"
3	Lorena Wiebes (NED)	SD Worx	+ 3"
4	Riejanne Markus (NED)	Team Jumbo–Visma	+ 8"
5	Lotte Kopecky (BEL)	SD Worx	+ 8"
6	Demi Vollering (NED)	SD Worx	+ 10"
7	Anna Henderson (GBR)	Team Jumbo–Visma	+ 11"
8	Maike van der Duin (NED)	Canyon//SRAM	+ 11"
9	Zoe Bäckstedt (GBR)	Canyon//SRAM	+ 12"
10	Pfeiffer Georgi (GBR)	Team dsm–firmenich	+ 12"

=== Stage 2 ===
7 September 2023 – Leuven to Leuven, 7.1 km (4.4 mi)

Stage 2 Result
Rank	Rider	Team	Time
1	Lotte Kopecky (BEL)	SD Worx	8' 59"
2	Riejanne Markus (NED)	Team Jumbo–Visma	+ 2"
3	Zoe Bäckstedt (GBR)	Canyon//SRAM	+ 11"
4	Anna Henderson (GBR)	Team Jumbo–Visma	+ 11"
5	Christina Schweinberger (AUT)	Fenix–Deceuninck	+ 13"
6	Demi Vollering (NED)	SD Worx	+ 15"
7	Georgia Baker (AUS)	Team Jayco–AlUla	+ 16"
8	Lorena Wiebes (NED)	SD Worx	+ 18"
9	Ally Wollaston (NZL)	AG Insurance–Soudal–Quick-Step	+ 19"
10	Pfeiffer Georgi (GBR)	Team dsm–firmenich	+ 19"

General classification after Stage 2
Rank	Rider	Team	Time
1	Lotte Kopecky (BEL)	SD Worx	3h 40' 52"
2	Riejanne Markus (NED)	Team Jumbo–Visma	+ 2"
3	Lorena Wiebes (NED)	SD Worx	+ 13"
4	Anna Henderson (GBR)	Team Jumbo–Visma	+ 14"
5	Zoe Bäckstedt (GBR)	Canyon//SRAM	+ 15"
6	Demi Vollering (NED)	SD Worx	+ 17"
7	Christina Schweinberger (AUT)	Fenix–Deceuninck	+ 19"
8	Pfeiffer Georgi (GBR)	Team dsm–firmenich	+ 23"
9	Georgia Baker (AUS)	Team Jayco–AlUla	+ 23"
10	Ally Wollaston (NZL)	AG Insurance–Soudal–Quick-Step	+ 25"

=== Stage 3 ===
8 September 2023 – Emmeloord to Lelystad, 148.9 km (92.5 mi)

Stage 3 Result
Rank	Rider	Team	Time
1	Charlotte Kool (NED)	Team dsm–firmenich	3h 38' 02"
2	Lorena Wiebes (NED)	SD Worx	+ 0"
3	Elisa Balsamo (ITA)	Lidl–Trek	+ 0"
4	Letizia Paternoster (ITA)	Team Jayco–AlUla	+ 0"
5	Maike van der Duin (NED)	Canyon//SRAM	+ 0"
6	Maggie Coles-Lyster (CAN)	Israel Premier Tech Roland	+ 0"
7	Arlenis Sierra (CUB)	Movistar Team	+ 0"
8	Christina Schweinberger (AUT)	Fenix–Deceuninck	+ 0"
9	Katrijn De Clercq (BEL)	Lotto–Dstny Ladies	+ 0"
10	Marthe Goossens (BEL)	AG Insurance–Soudal–Quick-Step	+ 0"

General classification after Stage 3
Rank	Rider	Team	Time
1	Lotte Kopecky (BEL)	SD Worx	7h 18' 54"
2	Riejanne Markus (NED)	Team Jumbo–Visma	+ 2"
3	Lorena Wiebes (NED)	SD Worx	+ 7"
4	Anna Henderson (GBR)	Team Jumbo–Visma	+ 14"
5	Zoe Bäckstedt (GBR)	Canyon//SRAM	+ 15"
6	Charlotte Kool (NED)	Team dsm–firmenich	+ 15"
7	Demi Vollering (NED)	SD Worx	+ 17"
8	Christina Schweinberger (AUT)	Fenix–Deceuninck	+ 19"
9	Pfeiffer Georgi (GBR)	Team dsm–firmenich	+ 23"
10	Georgia Baker (AUS)	Team Jayco–AlUla	+ 23"

=== Stage 4 ===
9 September 2023 – Valkenburg to Valkenburg, 131.6 km (81.8 mi)

Stage 4 Result
Rank	Rider	Team	Time
1	Lotte Kopecky (BEL)	SD Worx	3h 24' 17"
2	Lorena Wiebes (NED)	SD Worx	+ 0"
3	Katarzyna Niewiadoma (POL)	Canyon//SRAM	+ 0"
4	Sofia Bertizzolo (ITA)	UAE Team ADQ	+ 10"
5	Anna Henderson (GBR)	Team Jumbo–Visma	+ 13"
6	Shirin van Anrooij (NED)	Lidl–Trek	+ 13"
7	Annemiek van Vleuten (NED)	Movistar Team	+ 13"
8	Pfeiffer Georgi (GBR)	Team dsm–firmenich	+ 13"
9	Zoe Bäckstedt (GBR)	Canyon//SRAM	+ 21"
10	Karlijn Swinkels (NED)	Team Jumbo–Visma	+ 21"

General classification after Stage 4
Rank	Rider	Team	Time
1	Lotte Kopecky (BEL)	SD Worx	10h 43' 01"
2	Lorena Wiebes (NED)	SD Worx	+ 11"
3	Anna Henderson (GBR)	Team Jumbo–Visma	+ 37"
4	Pfeiffer Georgi (GBR)	Team dsm–firmenich	+ 46"
5	Zoe Bäckstedt (GBR)	Canyon//SRAM	+ 46"
6	Katarzyna Niewiadoma (POL)	Canyon//SRAM	+ 48"
7	Annemiek van Vleuten (NED)	Movistar Team	+ 57"
8	Karlijn Swinkels (NED)	Team Jumbo–Visma	+ 57"
9	Christina Schweinberger (AUT)	Fenix–Deceuninck	+ 58"
10	Shirin van Anrooij (NED)	Lidl–Trek	+ 1' 04"

=== Stage 5 ===
10 September 2023 – Arnhem to Arnhem, 150.3 km (93.4 mi)

Stage 5 Result
Rank	Rider	Team	Time
1	Lorena Wiebes (NED)	SD Worx	3h 44' 53"
2	Elisa Balsamo (ITA)	Lidl–Trek	+ 0"
3	Lotte Kopecky (BEL)	SD Worx	+ 0"
4	Ruby Roseman-Gannon (AUS)	Team Jayco–AlUla	+ 0"
5	Pfeiffer Georgi (GBR)	Team dsm–firmenich	+ 0"
6	Anniina Ahtosalo (FIN)	Uno-X Pro Cycling Team	+ 0"
7	Christina Schweinberger (AUT)	Fenix–Deceuninck	+ 0"
8	Zoe Bäckstedt (GBR)	Canyon//SRAM	+ 0"
9	Anna Henderson (GBR)	Team Jumbo–Visma	+ 0"
10	Sofia Bertizzolo (ITA)	UAE Team ADQ	+ 3"

General classification after Stage 5
Rank	Rider	Team	Time
1	Lotte Kopecky (BEL)	SD Worx	14h 27' 50"
2	Lorena Wiebes (NED)	SD Worx	+ 5"
3	Anna Henderson (GBR)	Team Jumbo–Visma	+ 41"
4	Pfeiffer Georgi (GBR)	Team dsm–firmenich	+ 50"
5	Zoe Bäckstedt (GBR)	Canyon//SRAM	+ 50"
6	Katarzyna Niewiadoma (POL)	Canyon//SRAM	+ 55"
7	Christina Schweinberger (AUT)	Fenix–Deceuninck	+ 1' 02"
8	Karlijn Swinkels (NED)	Team Jumbo–Visma	+ 1' 04"
9	Shirin van Anrooij (NED)	Lidl–Trek	+ 1' 16"
10	Yara Kastelijn (NED)	Fenix–Deceuninck	+ 1' 33"

== Classification leadership table ==
Stage	Winner	General classification	Points classification	Mountain classification	Young rider classification	Team classification	Combativity award
Prologue	Charlotte Kool	Charlotte Kool	Charlotte Kool	Not awarded	Maike van der Duin	SD Worx	Not awarded
1	Elisa Balsamo	Charlotte Kool	Charlotte Kool	Lieke Nooijen	Maike van der Duin	SD Worx	Femke de Vries
2	Lotte Kopecky	Lotte Kopecky	Lotte Kopecky	Lieke Nooijen	Zoe Bäckstedt	SD Worx	Not awarded
3	Charlotte Kool	Lotte Kopecky	Charlotte Kool	Lieke Nooijen	Zoe Bäckstedt	SD Worx	Scarlett Souren
4	Lotte Kopecky	Lotte Kopecky	Lorena Wiebes	Femke Gerritse	Zoe Bäckstedt	SD Worx	Zoe Bäckstedt
5	Lorena Wiebes	Lotte Kopecky	Lorena Wiebes	Karlijn Swinkels	Zoe Bäckstedt	Lidl–Trek	Katarzyna Niewiadoma
Final classification		Lotte Kopecky	Lorena Wiebes	Karlijn Swinkels	Zoe Bäckstedt	Lidl–Trek	Not awarded

== Classification standings ==
Legend
Denotes the winner of the general classification	Denotes the winner of the points classification
Denotes the winner of the young rider classification	Denotes the winner of the mountains classification

=== General classification ===
Final general classification (1–10)
Rank	Rider	Team	Time
1	Lotte Kopecky (BEL)	SD Worx	14h 27' 50"
2	Lorena Wiebes (NED)	SD Worx	+ 5"
3	Anna Henderson (GBR)	Team Jumbo–Visma	+ 41"
4	Pfeiffer Georgi (GBR)	Team dsm–firmenich	+ 50"
5	Zoe Bäckstedt (GBR)	Canyon//SRAM	+ 50"
6	Katarzyna Niewiadoma (POL)	Canyon//SRAM	+ 55"
7	Christina Schweinberger (AUT)	Fenix–Deceuninck	+ 1' 02"
8	Karlijn Swinkels (NED)	Team Jumbo–Visma	+ 1' 04"
9	Shirin van Anrooij (NED)	Lidl–Trek	+ 1' 16"
10	Yara Kastelijn (NED)	Fenix–Deceuninck	+ 1' 33"

=== Points classification ===
Final points classification (1–10)
Rank	Rider	Team	Points
1	Lorena Wiebes (NED)	SD Worx	107
2	Lotte Kopecky (BEL)	SD Worx	89
3	Elisa Balsamo (ITA)	Lidl–Trek	69
4	Charlotte Kool (NED)	Team dsm–firmenich	66
5	Anna Henderson (GBR)	Team Jumbo–Visma	50
6	Zoe Bäckstedt (GBR)	Canyon//SRAM	38
7	Pfeiffer Georgi (NED)	Team dsm–firmenich	32
8	Christina Schweinberger (AUT)	Fenix–Deceuninck	30
9	Maike van der Duin (NED)	Canyon//SRAM	30
10	Letizia Paternoster (ITA)	Team Jayco–AlUla	24

=== Mountains classification ===
Final mountains classification (1–10)
Rank	Rider	Team	Points
1	Karlijn Swinkels (NED)	Team Jumbo–Visma	18
2	Femke Gerritse (NED)	Parkhotel Valkenburg	16
3	Brodie Chapman (AUS)	Lidl–Trek	8
4	Lieke Nooijen (NED)	Parkhotel Valkenburg	8
5	Katarzyna Niewiadoma (POL)	Canyon//SRAM	7
6	Maria Giulia Confalonieri (ITA)	Uno-X Pro Cycling Team	6
7	Lotte Kopecky (BEL)	SD Worx	5
8	Floortje Mackaij (NED)	Movistar Team	5
9	Lauretta Hanson (AUS)	Lidl–Trek	5
10	Quinty Ton (NED)	Liv Racing TeqFind	5

=== Young rider classification ===
Final young rider classification (1–10)
Rank	Rider	Team	Time
1	Zoe Bäckstedt (GBR)	Canyon//SRAM	14h 28' 40"
2	Shirin van Anrooij (NED)	Lidl–Trek	+ 26"
3	Maud Rijnbeek (NED)	AG Insurance–Soudal–Quick-Step	+ 2' 15"
4	Marthe Goossens (BEL)	AG Insurance–Soudal–Quick-Step	+ 5' 31"
5	Femke Gerritse (NED)	Parkhotel Valkenburg	+ 8' 36"
6	Maike van der Duin (NED)	Canyon//SRAM	+ 10' 36"
7	Anniina Ahtosalo (FIN)	Uno-X Pro Cycling Team	+ 10' 56"
8	Maud Oudeman (NED)	Team Jumbo–Visma	+ 16' 00"
9	Neve Bradbury (AUS)	Canyon//SRAM	+ 19' 07"
10	Lieke Nooijen (NED)	Parkhotel Valkenburg	+ 20' 49"

=== Teams classification ===
Final team classification (1–10)
Rank	Team	Time
1	(United States) Lidl–Trek	43h 28' 19"
2	(Netherlands) SD Worx	+ 18"
3	(Germany) Canyon//SRAM	+ 1' 29"
4	(Spain) Movistar Team	+ 4' 34"
5	(Netherlands) Team Jumbo–Visma	+ 12' 41"
6	(Norway) Uno-X Pro Cycling Team	+ 12' 55"
7	(Belgium) Fenix–Deceuninck	+ 13' 52"
8	(Belgium) AG Insurance–Soudal–Quick-Step	+ 13' 57"
9	(Netherlands) Liv Racing TeqFind	+ 15' 09"
10	(Australia) Team Jayco–AlUla	+ 18' 43"
