= Cecilie Uttrup Ludwig =

Danish cyclist (born 1995)

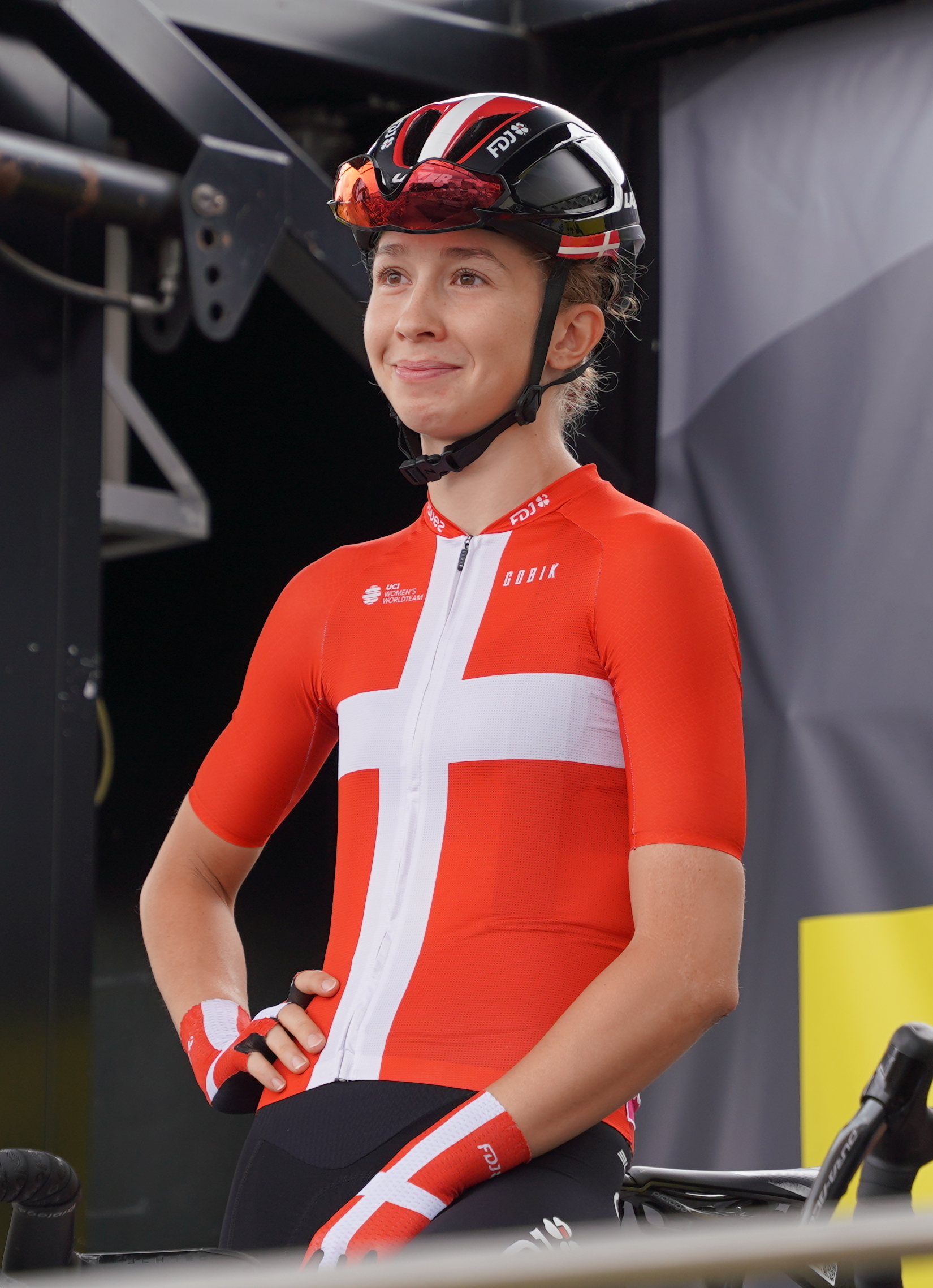
- Ludwig at the 2022 Tour de France Femmes

Personal information
- Full name: Cecilie Uttrup Ludwig
- Nickname: Cille
- Born: 23 August 1995 (age 31) Frederiksberg Municipality, Denmark
- Height: 1.68 m (5 ft 6 in)

Cycling career
- Sport: Cycling
- Current team: Canyon//SRAM
- Discipline: Road
- Role: Rider
- Rider type: All-rounder

Professional teams
- 2015: Team Rytger
- 2016: Team BMS BIRN
- 2017–2019: Cervélo–Bigla Pro Cycling
- 2020–2024: FDJ Nouvelle-Aquitaine Futuroscope
- 2025–: Canyon//SRAM Zondacrypto

Major wins
- Grand Tours Tour de France 1 individual stage (2022) Giro Donne Mountains classification (2020) Youth classification (2017) One day races National Road Race Championships (2022) National Time Trial Championships (2016–2018)
Medal record
Women's road cycling
Representing Denmark
World Championships
Bronze medal – third place	2023 Glasgow	Road race

Cecilie Uttrup Ludwig (born 23 August 1995) is a Danish professional road cyclist, who currently rides for UCI Women's WorldTeam Canyon//SRAM.

== Career ==
As a junior, she competed at the 2012 UCI Road World Championships and the 2013 UCI Road World Championships.

In the 2018 La Course by Le Tour de France, she finished in 4th place, with her teammate Ashleigh Moolman taking the final podium place. She also took the mountains classification in this race. After this race, she gave her first of what would become several excitable interviews, with this one including advice for any cyclist who has bad legs to have their wisdom teeth removed. At the very, end she said was so excited for chocolate and champagne and pizza and vacation. Over the next few years, her results in France would only get better. The next year, she claimed the final podium place, while in 2021, she placed 2nd, and in 2022, she won a stage.

She finished on the podium in 3rd in the 2019 Tour of Flanders. Her post race interview went viral as a result of her excited and comical demeanor giving a vivid description of the passionate fans and the sprint finish as the peloton was closing in on her group of surviving breakaway riders. Near the end of the interview she described herself as a dead fish, but a happy dead fish.

She finished in fourth place in the 2020 Giro Rosa, and won the green jersey as winner of the mountains classification.

In July 2022, she was named as one of the pre-race favourites for the first edition of the Tour de France Femmes. She won stage 3 of the race in a reduced sprint, and once again had a memorable post race interview. During the course of the interview she commented, through tears of joy, that the win was very satisfying considering the "fucking shit day" that she and her teammates had suffered the day before with crashes and bad luck. On stage 7, which was the first of back-to-back high mountain stages, she finished third. As a result, she rose in the overall standings to fifth.

== Major results ==
2012
UCI Junior Road World Championships

2nd Time trial
8th Road race

2016
1st Time trial, National Road Championships
1st Overall Tour de Feminin-O cenu Českého Švýcarska

1st Young rider classification
1st Stages 1 & 5

1st Mountains classification, Tour of Norway
Gracia–Orlová

1st Mountains classification
1st Sprints classification

1st Young rider classification, Auensteiner–Radsporttage
5th KZN Summer Series Race 2
7th 94.7 Cycle Challenge
9th Road race, UEC European Road Championships
9th Gooik–Geraardsbergen–Gooik
10th Boels Rental Hills Classic
2017
1st Time trial, National Road Championships
1st Youth classification, UCI Women's World Tour
1st Overall Setmana Ciclista Valenciana

1st Young rider classification

1st Young rider classification, Giro Rosa
2nd Overall Giro della Toscana

1st Young rider classification

2nd Time trial, UEC European Under-23 Championships
2nd Crescent Vårgårda UCI Women's WorldTour TTT
3rd UCI Road World Championships – Women's team time trial
3rd Trofeo Alfredo Binda
3rd La Classique Morbihan
5th Grand Prix de Plumelec-Morbihan
7th Overall Emakumeen XXX. Bira
8th Overall The Women's Tour
9th Strade Bianche
10th UCI Road World Championships – Women's time trial
10th Liège–Bastogne–Liège
2018
1st Time trial, National Road Championships
3rd Crescent Vårgårda UCI Women's WorldTour TTT
3rd Ladies Tour of Norway – TTT
3rd Giro dell'Emilia
4th Overall Setmana Ciclista Valenciana
4th La Course by Le Tour de France
4th Chrono des Nations
6th Overall Giro Rosa
7th Trofeo Alfredo Binda
10th Strade Bianche
2019
1st Grand Prix de Plumelec-Morbihan
1st Mountains classification, Tour of Scotland
3rd Trofeo Alfredo Binda
3rd Tour of Flanders
3rd La Course by Le Tour de France
4th Overall Tour de Bretagne
5th Strade Bianche
6th Amstel Gold Race
8th La Flèche Wallonne
10th Overall Setmana Ciclista Valenciana
10th Liège–Bastogne–Liège
2020
1st Giro dell'Emilia
2nd La Flèche Wallonne
3rd Road race, National Road Championships
4th Overall Giro Rosa

1st Mountains classification

7th Strade Bianche
8th Road race, UCI Road World Championships
2021
2nd La Course by Le Tour de France
3rd Trofeo Alfredo Binda
5th Overall Tour of Norway
5th Strade Bianche
6th Overall Vuelta a Burgos

1st Stage 3

7th Tour of Flanders
7th Amstel Gold Race
8th La Flèche Wallonne
8th Liège–Bastogne–Liège
8th Road race, UCI Road World Championships
2022
1st Road race, National Road Championships
1st Overall Tour of Scandinavia

1st Stage 5

2nd Overall Setmana Ciclista Valenciana
3rd Durango-Durango Emakumeen Saria
5th Overall Challenge by La Vuelta
5th Overall Vuelta a Burgos
5th Road race, UCI Road World Championships
5th Strade Bianche
6th Tour of Flanders
6th Overall Giro Donne
7th Overall Tour de France

1st Stage 3

9th Trofeo Alfredo Binda
2023
1st Giro dell'Emilia
2nd Overall Tour of Scandinavia

1st Points classification
1st Stage 2 & 5

2nd Time trial, National Road Championships
2nd Tre Valli Varesine
3rd Road race, UCI Road World Championships
3rd Strade Bianche
4th Overall Tour Féminin International des Pyrénées
6th Overall Giro Donne
7th Overall Tour de France
10th Overall Setmana Ciclista Valenciana
10th Amstel Gold Race
2024
3rd Deakin University Road Race
8th Overall Giro d'Italia
9th Overall Tour Down Under

1st Stage 2

2025
6th Overall Tour of Britain
7th Tre Valli Varesine

=== General classification results timeline ===
Major Tour results timeline
Stage race	2015	2016	2017	2018	2019	2020	2021	2022	2023	2024	2025
La Vuelta Femenina	—	—	—	—	—	—	—	5	—	—	—
Giro d'Italia Women	—	—	16	6	14	4	DNF	6	6	8	17
Tour de France	Did not exist							7	7	28	21
Stage race results timeline
Stage race	2015	2016	2017	2018	2019	2020	2021	2022	2023	2024	2025
Setmana Ciclista Valenciana	Did not exist		1	4	10	—	—	2	10	—	24
Emakumeen Euskal Bira	—	—	7	66	—	Not held					
Tour of Britain	—	—	8	17	—	NH	—	—	NH	—	6
Simac Ladies Tour	—	—	—	—	—	NH	DNF	—	—	—	—
Itzulia Women	—	—	—	—	—	NH	—	—	—	—	28
Vuelta a Burgos	—	—	—	—	—	NH	6	5	11	28	—
Tour de Suisse	Not held						—	—	—	DNF	—
Tour de Romandie Féminin	Did not exist							14	13	52	—
Belgium Tour	11	16	—	—	—	NH	—	—	Not held		
Tour of Scandinavia	38	14	—	—	—	NH	5	1	2	Not held	

=== Classics results timeline ===
Monuments	2015	2016	2017	2018	2019	2020	2021	2022	2023	2024	2025
Milano–Sanremo	Not held										36
Tour of Flanders	66	43	12	30	3	16	7	6	29	—	36
Paris–Roubaix	Did not exist					NH	16	—	—	—	—
Liège–Bastogne–Liège	Did not exist		10	41	10	17	8	—	30	—	41
Classics	2015	2016	2017	2018	2019	2020	2021	2022	2023	2024	2025
Omloop Het Nieuwsblad	82	32	41	—	11	—	17	—	20	DNF	—
Strade Bianche	—	—	9	10	5	7	5	5	3	—	39
Trofeo Alfredo Binda	DNF	—	3	7	3	NH	3	9	—	—	28
Gent–Wevelgem	—	—	38	65	54	—	36	—	—	—	—
Dwars door Vlaanderen	—	38	82	51	—	NH	—	24	21	—	—
Amstel Gold Race	Did not exist		67	39	6	NH	7	—	10	—	67
La Flèche Wallonne	—	—	17	40	8	2	8	—	72	—	43
GP de Plouay	—	—	39	20	—	30	—	51	—	—	
Open de Suède Vårgårda	—	—	26	3	—	Not held		—	Not held		
Giro dell'Emilia Internazionale	—	—	—	3	—	1	—	—	1	11	

Legend
—	Did not compete
DNF	Did not finish
NH	Not held
DNE	Did not exist
