= 2023 La Flèche Wallonne Femmes =

Cycling race

2023 UCI Women's World Tour, race 13 of 27
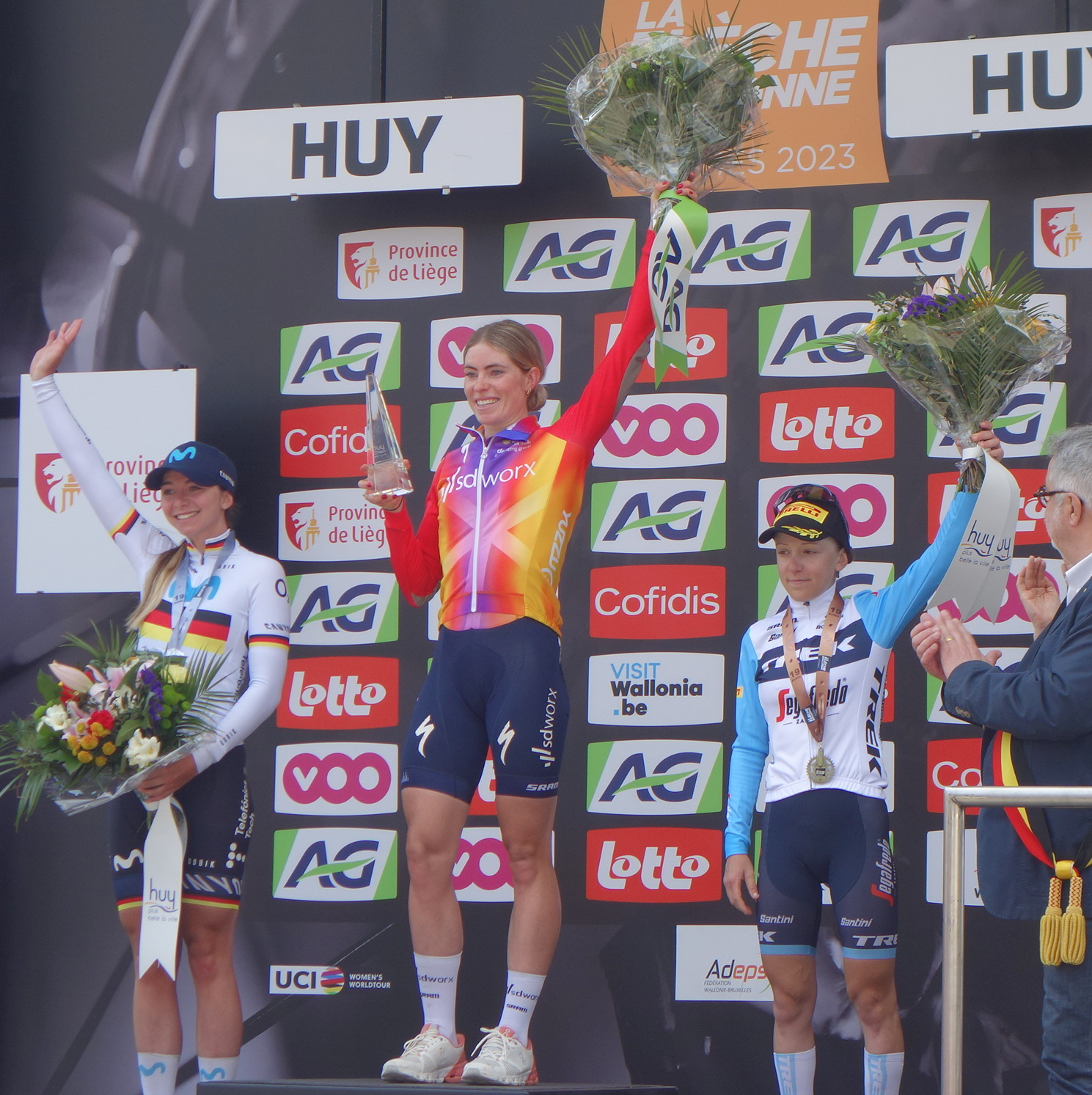
- Winner Demi Vollering on the podium

Race details
- Dates: 19 April 2023
- Stages: 1
- Distance: 127.3 km (79.1 mi)
- Winning time: 3h 29' 25"

Results
	Winner	Demi Vollering (NED)	(SD Worx)
	Second	Liane Lippert (GER)	(Movistar Team)
	Third	Gaia Realini (ITA)	(Trek–Segafredo)

The 2023 La Flèche Wallonne Femmes was a Belgian road cycling one-day race that took place on 19 April 2023. It was the 26th edition of La Flèche Wallonne Féminine and the 13th event of the 2023 UCI Women's World Tour. The race was won by Dutch rider Demi Vollering of SD Worx, who won the race for the first time.

== Route ==
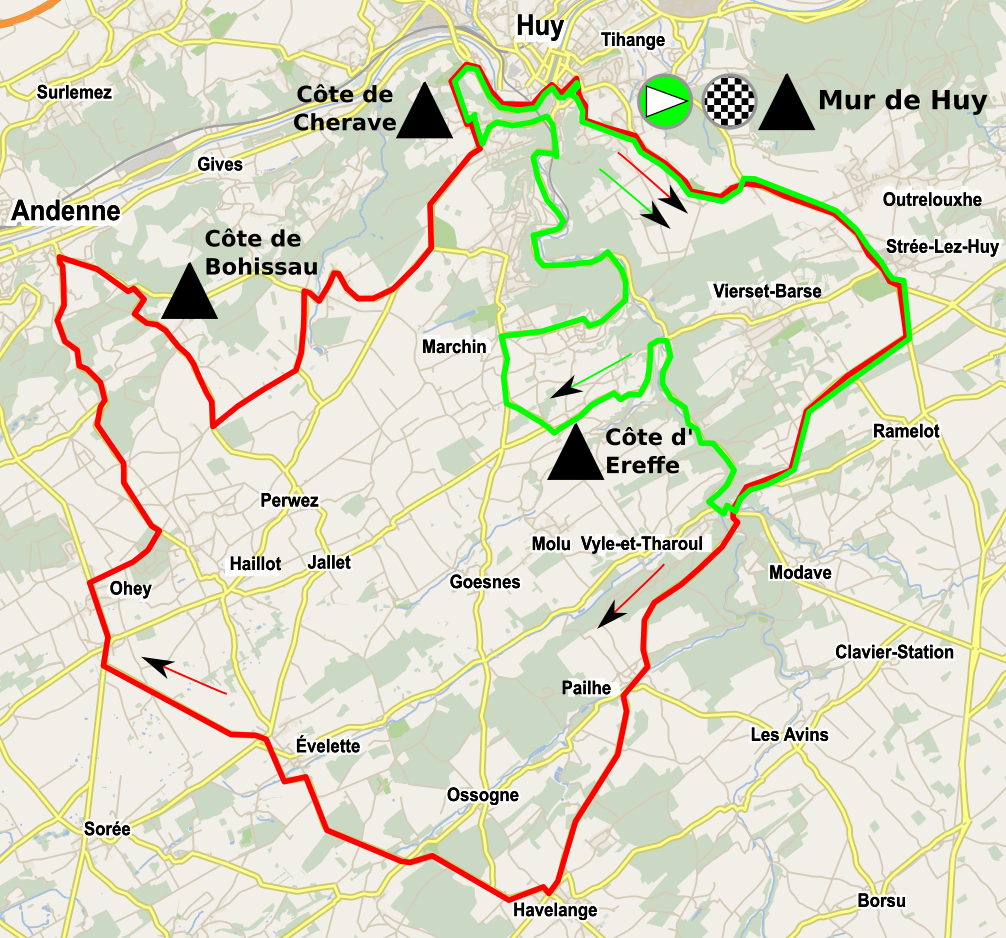
Course map of the 2023 edition

The race started and finished in Huy, with the finish line on the top of the final ascent of the Mur de Huy - one of three ascents of the Mur on the route. There were 7 categorised climbs:

- 53 km: Mur de Huy –1.3 km climb at 9.6%
- 71 km: Côte d'Ereffe – 2.1 km climb at 4.6%
- 84 km: Côte de Cherave – 1.5 km climb at 7.6%
- 90 km: Mur de Huy – 1.3 km climb at 9.6%
- 109 km: Côte d'Ereffe – 2.1 km climb at 4.6%
- 122 km: Côte de Cherave – 1.5 km climb at 7.6%
- 127 km: Mur de Huy – 1.3 km climb at 9.4%

== Summary ==
Prior to the event, favourites were noted to be Demi Vollering of SD Worx, Gaia Realini of Trek–Segafredo and Silvia Persico of UAE Team ADQ. The 2022 winner Marta Cavalli was not considered to be a contender, following her crash at the 2022 Tour de France Femmes and withdrawal from the 2023 Amstel Gold Race.

An early breakaway was captured by the peloton prior to the first ascent of the Côte de Cherave. On the penultimate climb of the Mur de Huy with around 35 kilometres to go, an elite group of riders including Annemiek van Vleuten of Movistar, Kasia Niewiadoma of Canyon–SRAM and Ashleigh Moolman-Pasio of AG Insurance–Soudal–Quick-Step attacks, going clear of the pack. However, Marlen Reusser and Vollering of SD Worx ensured that the group did not gain more than around 15 seconds, allowing them to be caught soon afterwards.

On the final ascent of the Côte de Cherave, Vollering pushed hard - bringing a group of eleven riders including van Vleuten, Moolman-Pasio, Realini, Elise Chabbey of Canyon–SRAM, Liane Lippert of Movistar, and Mavi Garcia of Liv Racing TeqFind with her. However, none of the riders wished to push prior to the final climb of the Mur de Huy - a 1.3 km climb at 9.6% - allowing a larger group of riders to reform.

Niewiadoma led the group towards the Mur, with Vollering overtaking her at the foot of the climb. Vollering then motored up the steep climb ahead of her rivals, winning by 5 seconds ahead of Lippert. Realini took third place after overtaking García with around 75 metres remaining.

It was Vollering's first win at La Flèche Wallonne Féminine, and her third win of the season following victories at Strade Bianche Donne and the Amstel Gold Race. Vollering also took the leader’s jersey of the UCI Women's World Tour following her win.

== Result ==
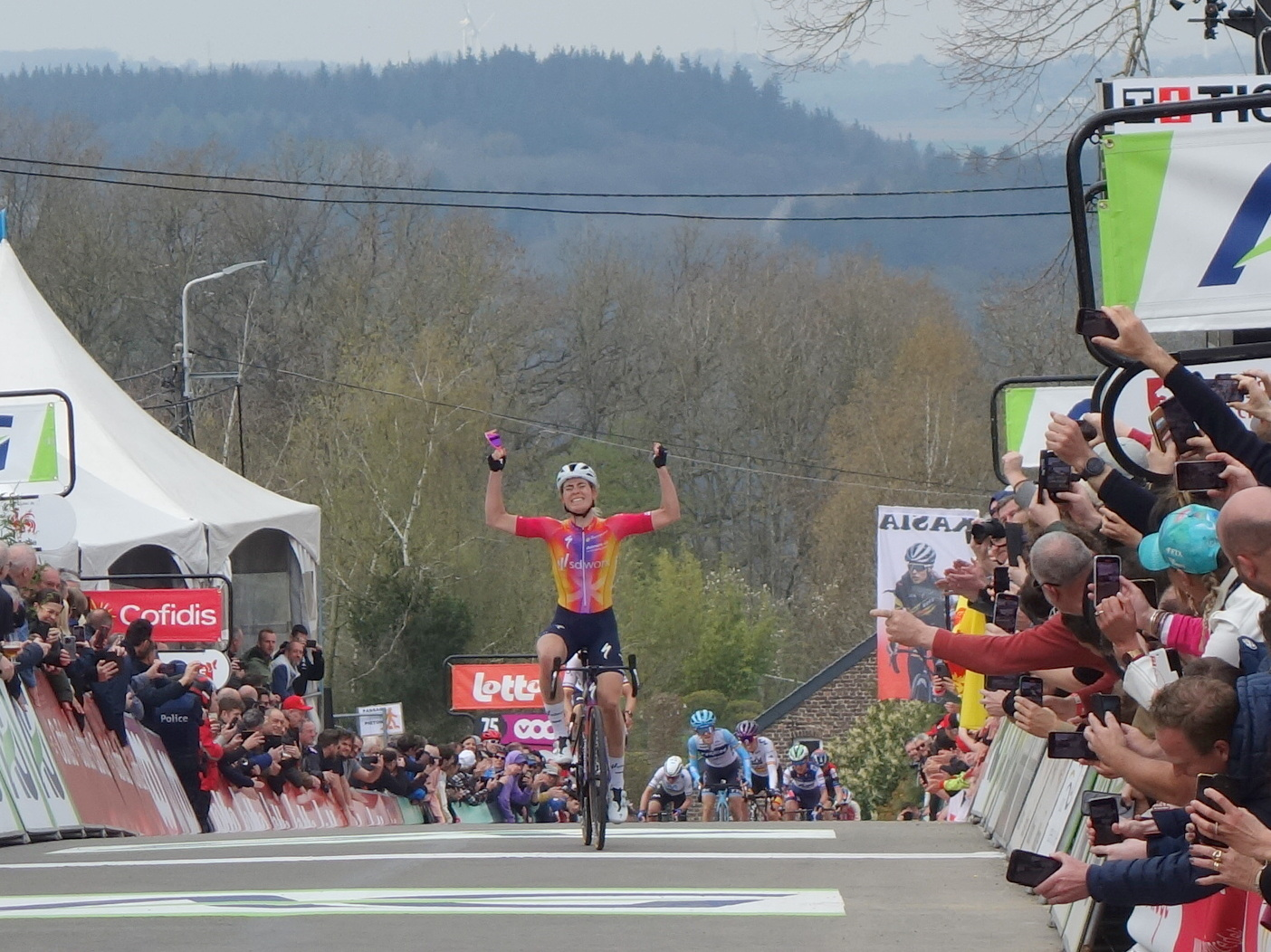
Vollering crossing the finish line

Result
Rank	Rider	Team	Time
1	Demi Vollering (NED)	SD Worx	3h 29' 25"
2	Liane Lippert (GER)	Movistar Team	+ 5"
3	Gaia Realini (ITA)	Trek–Segafredo	+ 7"
4	Mavi García (ESP)	Liv Racing TeqFind	+ 10"
5	Évita Muzic (FRA)	FDJ–Suez	+ 10"
6	Ashleigh Moolman Pasio (RSA)	AG Insurance–Soudal–Quick-Step	+ 10"
7	Annemiek van Vleuten (NED)	Movistar Team	+ 10"
8	Silvia Persico (ITA)	UAE Team ADQ	+ 16"
9	Elise Chabbey (SUI)	Canyon//SRAM	+ 16"
10	Yara Kastelijn (NED)	Fenix–Deceuninck	+ 16"

== See also ==
- 2023 in women's road cycling
