= 2023 Classic Brugge–De Panne Women =

2023 Classic Brugge–De Panne Dames Elite
2023 UCI Women's World Tour, race 8 of 27
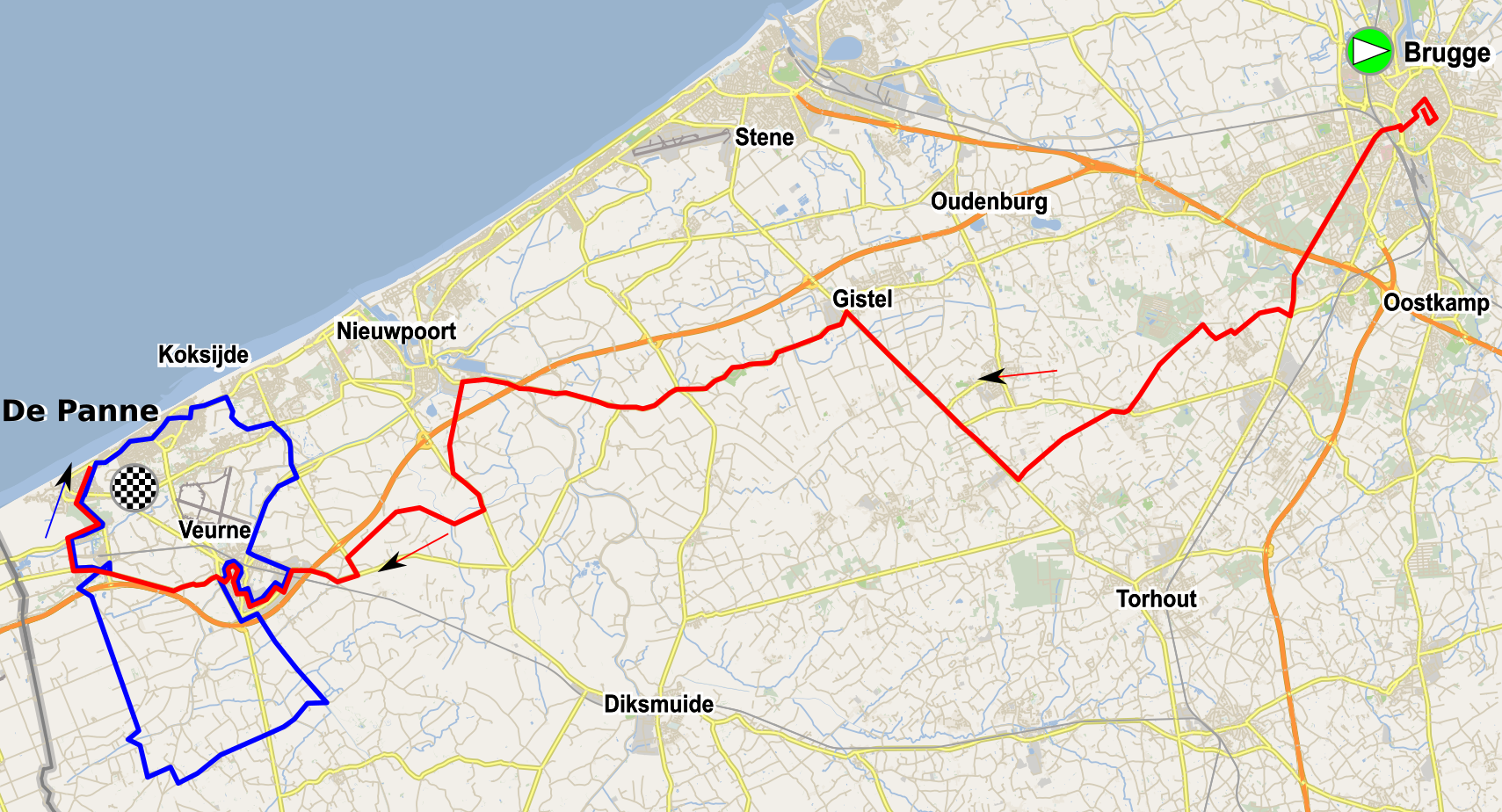

Race details
- Dates: 23 March 2022
- Stages: 1
- Distance: 163.1 km (101.3 mi)
- Winning time: 4h 17' 12"

Results
	Winner	Pfeiffer Georgi (GBR)	(Team DSM)
	Second	Elisa Balsamo (ITA)	(Trek–Segafredo)
	Third	Lorena Wiebes (NED)	(SD Worx)

The 2023 Classic Brugge–De Panne was a Belgian road cycling one-day race that took place on 23 March 2023. It was the 6th edition of Classic Brugge–De Panne and the 8th event of the 2023 UCI Women's World Tour.

The race was won by British rider Pfeiffer Georgi of Team DSM after a solo attack with around 7 kilometres to go.

== Summary ==
The race is considered to be a "sprinters classic", and four of the five editions of the race have been won in a bunch sprint. Sprinters including defending champion Elisa Balsamo, Lorena Wiebes, Chiara Consonni and Charlotte Kool were thought to be contenders for the win.

With a route similar to the previous editions of the race, the 161.3 kilometres (100.2 mi) long race started in Bruges and finished in De Panne, after two laps of a 47.9 kilometres (29.8 mi) finishing circuit.

As in common in the Classic Brugge–De Panne, the race was affected by crosswinds throughout. Around 45 kilometres into the race, a large crash in the peloton on narrow roads prior to the finishing circuits led to the race being neutralised for seven minutes to allow recovery and assessment of injured riders.

After entering the finishing circuit, a group got away from the peloton at De Moeren. This group included favourites such as Elisa Balsamo of Trek–Segafredo, Lorena Wiebes of SD Worx and Charlotte Kool of Team DSM, as well as Kool's teammates Pfeiffer Georgi and Megan Jastrab. The crosswinds made it difficult to chase, with the leading group growing their gap from 17 to 40 seconds. On the final pass through De Moeren, Georgi and Jastrab split the front group, leaving just six riders.

Entering De Panne, both Jastrab and Georgi realised they needed to attack the group of sprinters if they wanted to win - with Georgi successfully escaping with around 7 kilometres to go. Sprinters in the chase group did not wish to waste energy in light of the final sprint, so Georgi's gap quickly grew.

Pfeiffer Georgi crossed the line to win her first World Tour race, 1 minute 10 seconds ahead of the chase group. In the sprint for second place, Balsamo beat Wiebes, with Jastrab coming fourth. The peloton arrived over 4 minutes behind Georgi.

== Result ==
Result.
Rank	Rider	Team	Time
1	Pfeiffer Georgi (GBR)	Team DSM	4h 17' 12"
2	Elisa Balsamo (ITA)	Trek–Segafredo	+ 1' 10"
3	Lorena Wiebes (NED)	SD Worx	+ 1' 10"
4	Megan Jastrab (USA)	Team DSM	+ 1' 10"
5	Shari Bossuyt (BEL)	Canyon//SRAM	+ 1' 10"
6	Amalie Dideriksen (DEN)	Uno-X Pro Cycling Team	+ 1' 10"
7	Maike van der Duin (NED)	Canyon//SRAM	+ 1' 38"
8	Christina Schweinberger (AUT)	Fenix–Deceuninck	+ 1' 39"
9	Chiara Consonni (ITA)	UAE Team ADQ	+ 4' 14"
10	Ilaria Sanguineti (ITA)	Uno-X Pro Cycling Team	+ 4' 14"
