= 2023 Amstel Gold Race (women's race) =

2023 Amstel Gold Race Ladies Edition
2023 UCI Women's World Tour, race 12 of 27
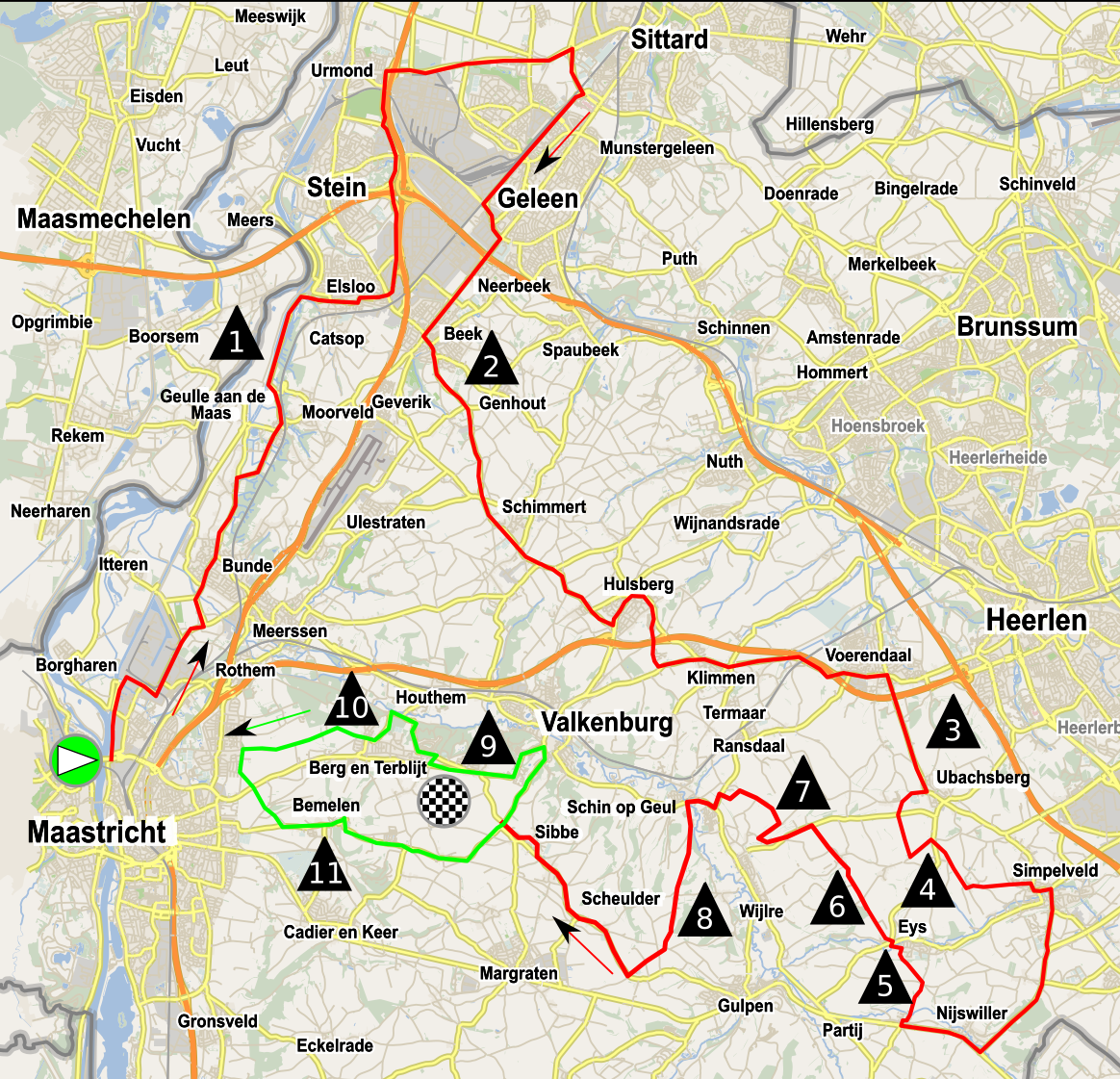

Race details
- Dates: 16 April 2023
- Stages: 1
- Distance: 155.8 km (96.8 mi)
- Winning time: 4h 06' 54"

Results
| | Winner | Demi Vollering (NED) | (SD Worx) |
| | Second | Lotte Kopecky (BEL) | (SD Worx) |
| | Third | Shirin van Anrooij (NED) | (Trek–Segafredo) |

The 2023 Amstel Gold Race Ladies Edition was a Dutch road cycling one-day race held on 16 April 2023. It was the 9th edition of the Amstel Gold Race for women, and the 12th event of the 2023 UCI Women's World Tour.

The race was won by Dutch rider Demi Vollering of SD Worx, who won the race for the first time.

== Route ==
Starting at Maastricht's Markt, the city's central market square, the race finished in Valkenburg after covering 155.8 kilometres (96.8 mi), with 21 climbs on the route. The route included eight climbs through Limburg, before four laps of a finishing circuit featuring the Geulhemmerberg, Bemelerberg and Cauberg climbs. The Cauberg, the most difficult and iconic passage (800m at 6.5%), was tackled five times. The course was around 28 kilometres (17 mi) longer than the 2022 edition, owing to an additional lap of the finishing circuit.

== Teams ==
Fourteen UCI Women's WorldTeams and ten UCI Women's Continental Teams competed in the race.

UCI Women's WorldTeams

- UAE Team ADQ
- Canyon//SRAM
- EF Education–Tibco–SVB
- FDJ–Suez
- Fenix–Deceuninck
- Human Powered Health
- Israel Premier Tech Roland
- Liv Racing TeqFind
- Movistar Team
- SD Worx
- Team Jayco–AlUla
- Team DSM
- Trek–Segafredo
- Uno-X Pro Cycling Team

UCI Women's Continental Teams

- AG Insurance–Soudal–Quick-Step
- Chevalmeire
- Cofidis
- GT Krush Rebellease Pro Cycling
- Team Jumbo–Visma
- Lifeplus Wahoo
- Lotto–Dstny Ladies
- Parkhotel Valkenburg
- Team Coop–Hitec Products
- Ceratizit–WNT Pro Cycling

== Summary ==
An early break was caught prior to the start of the finishing circuit. On the first descent of the Geulhemmerberg, Lucinda Brand (Trek–Segafredo) and Sabrina Stultiens (Liv Racing TeqFind) attacked, eventually gaining two minutes over the peloton. Various riders in the peloton attempted attacks, and with two laps of the finishing circuit remaining, the gap to Brand and Stultiens was around 30 seconds. With around 20 kilometres to go, they were caught by the peloton.

Entering the final lap, a multitude of contenders attempted attacks to escape the peloton - such as from Kristen Faulkner (Team Jayco–AlUla), Mischa Bredewold (SD Worx), Soraya Paladin (Canyon–SRAM) and Grace Brown (FDJ–Suez). At the bottom of the final ascent of the Cauberg, Brown and Paladin had a 10 second lead over the peloton. However a strong pace from Liane Lippert (Movistar Team) bridged the gap, bringing key contenders to the top of the climb. At the top of the Cauberg, Demi Vollering (SD Worx) attacked and went solo. Lippert and others looked around for assistance to chase, however riders were discouraged given that Vollering's teammate Lotte Kopecky was with them.

Vollering therefore won the race by 8 seconds, with Kopecky winning the sprint for second place - making it a 1-2 finish for SD Worx. It was Vollering's first win at Amstel Gold, and her second win of the season following victory at Strade Bianche Donne. Kopecky retained the UCI Women's World Tour leaders jersey.

== Result ==
Result
| Rank | Rider | Team | Time |
|---|---|---|---|
| 1 | Demi Vollering (NED) | SD Worx | 4h 06' 54" |
| 2 | Lotte Kopecky (BEL) | SD Worx | + 8" |
| 3 | Shirin van Anrooij (NED) | Trek–Segafredo | + 8" |
| 4 | Katarzyna Niewiadoma (POL) | Canyon//SRAM | + 8" |
| 5 | Soraya Paladin (ITA) | Canyon//SRAM | + 8" |
| 6 | Grace Brown (AUS) | FDJ–Suez | + 8" |
| 7 | Pfeiffer Georgi (GBR) | Team DSM | + 8" |
| 8 | Ashleigh Moolman-Pasio (RSA) | AG Insurance–Soudal–Quick-Step | + 8" |
| 9 | Silvia Persico (ITA) | UAE Team ADQ | + 8" |
| 10 | Cecilie Uttrup Ludwig (DEN) | FDJ–Suez | + 8" |
