= 2023 Gent–Wevelgem (women's race) =

Cycling race

2023 Gent–Wevelgem In Flanders Fields
2023 UCI Women's World Tour, race 9 of 27
- Event poster with previous winners Biniam Girmay and Elisa Balsamo

Race details
- Dates: 26 March 2023
- Stages: 1
- Distance: 162.5 km (101.0 mi)
- Winning time: 4h 16' 47"

Results
	Winner	Marlen Reusser (SUI)	(SD Worx)
	Second	Megan Jastrab (USA)	(Team DSM)
	Third	Maike van der Duin (NED)	(Lifeplus Wahoo)

The 2023 Gent–Wevelgem In Flanders Fields was a Belgian road cycling one-day race that took place on 26 March 2023. It was the 12th edition of Gent–Wevelgem and the 9th event of the 2023 UCI Women's World Tour.

Swiss rider Marlen Reusser of SD Worx won the race by nearly three minutes after a 40 kilometres (25 mi) solo breakaway. Megan Jastrab of Team DSM won the bunch sprint for 2nd place, followed by Maike van der Duin of Lifeplus Wahoo.

== Teams ==
All fourteen UCI Women's WorldTeams and ten UCI Women's Continental Teams took part in the race. Prior to the event, some riders in the Zaaf Cycling Team not to start the race in protest, due to unpaid wages by their team.

UCI Women's WorldTeams

- Canyon//SRAM
- EF Education–Tibco–SVB
- FDJ–Suez
- Human Powered Health
- Israel Premier Tech Roland
- Team Jumbo–Visma
- Liv Racing TeqFind
- Movistar Team
- SD Worx
- Team Jayco–AlUla
- Team DSM
- Trek–Segafredo
- UAE Team ADQ
- Uno-X Pro Cycling Team

UCI Women's Continental Teams

- Ceratizit–WNT Pro Cycling
- Parkhotel Valkenburg
- Duolar–Chevalmeire Cycling Team
- Cofidis
- Lotto–Dstny Ladies
- Lifeplus Wahoo
- AG Insurance–Soudal–Quick-Step
- Fenix–Deceuninck
- Proximus-Alphamotorhomes-Doltcini
- Zaaf Cycling Team

== Result ==
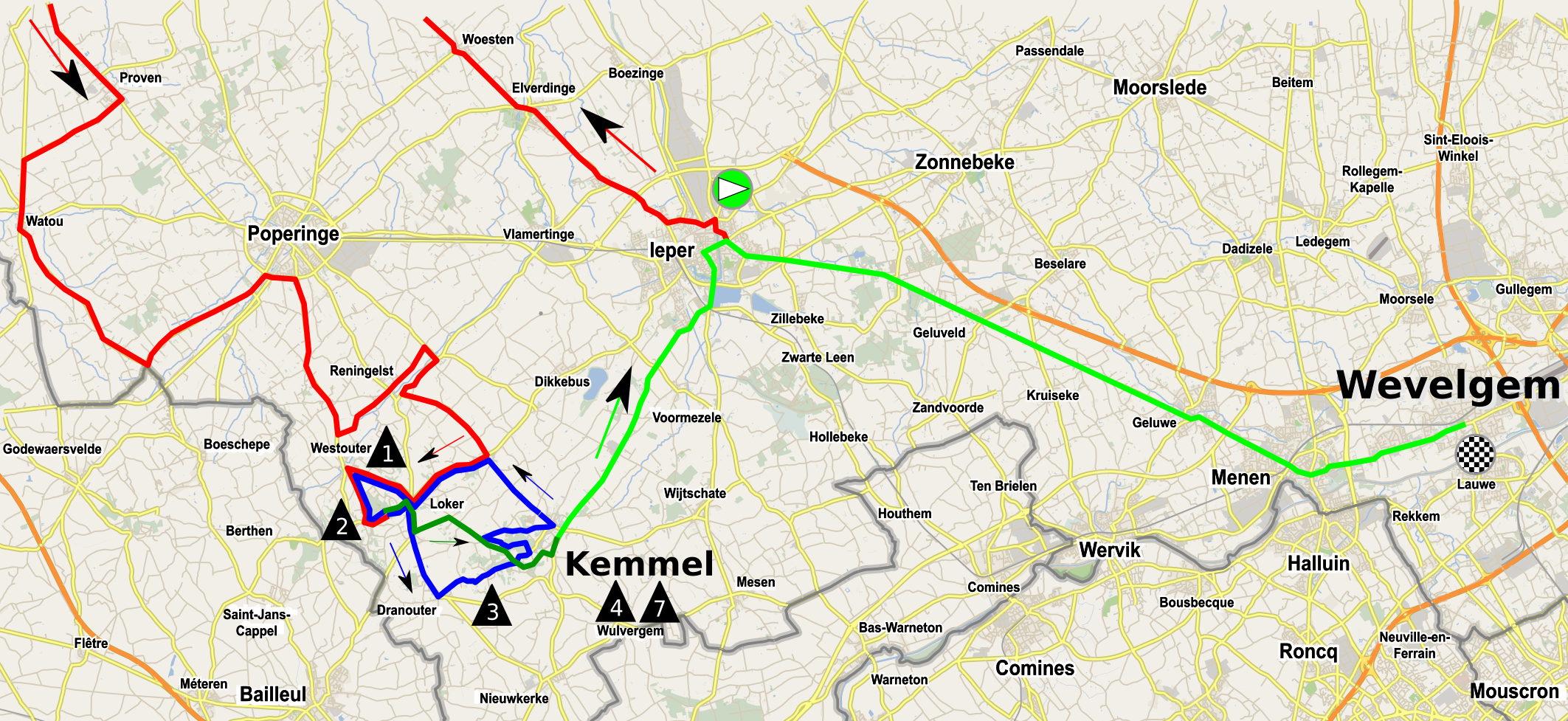
Route map

Result (1–10)
Rank	Rider	Team	Time
1	Marlen Reusser (SUI)	SD Worx	4h 16' 47"
2	Megan Jastrab (USA)	Team DSM	+ 2' 42"
3	Maike van der Duin (NED)	Lifeplus Wahoo	+ 2' 42"
4	Karlijn Swinkels (NED)	Team Jumbo–Visma	+ 2' 42"
5	Christina Schweinberger (AUT)	FDJ–Suez	+ 2' 42"
6	Marta Bastianelli (ITA)	UAE Team ADQ	+ 2' 42"
7	Elinor Barker (GBR)	Uno-X Pro Cycling Team	+ 2' 42"
8	Clara Copponi (FRA)	FDJ–Suez	+ 2' 42"
9	Anna Henderson (GBR)	Team Jumbo–Visma	+ 2' 42"
10	Shari Bossuyt (BEL)	Canyon//SRAM	+ 2' 42"

== See also ==
- 2023 in women's road cycling
