= Megan Jastrab =

American cyclist

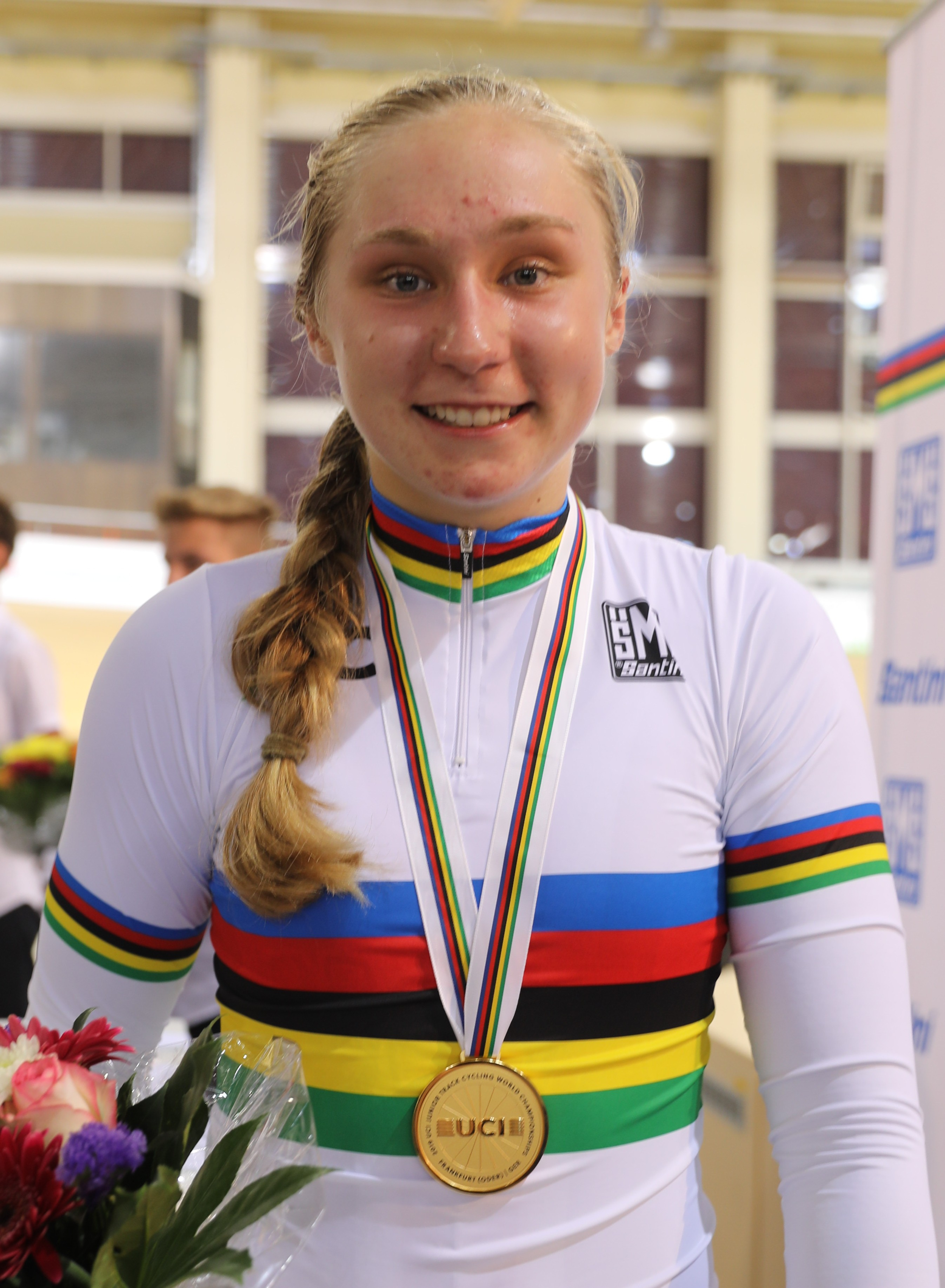
- Jastrab in 2019

Personal information
- Full name: Megan Jastrab
- Born: January 29, 2002 (age 24) Apple Valley, California, United States

Cycling career
- Sport: Cycling
- Current team: UAE Team L'Imad
- Discipline: Road
- Role: Rider

Professional teams
- 2019–2020: Rally UHC Cycling
- 2021–2025: Team DSM
- 2026–: UAE Team L'Imad
Medal record
Women's track cycling
Representing United States
Olympic Games
Bronze medal – third place	2020 Tokyo	Team pursuit
World Championships
Bronze medal – third place	2026 Shanghai	Elimination
Pan American Championships
Gold medal – first place	2024 Carson	Madison

Megan Jastrab (born January 29, 2002) is an American professional racing cyclist, who currently rides for UCI Women's WorldTeam UAE Team L'Imad. In September 2019, Jastrab won the women's junior road race at the 2019 UCI Road World Championships in Yorkshire, England.

In June 2021, she qualified to represent the United States at the 2020 Summer Olympics.

On April 12, 2026, Jastrab took fifth place in the Paris–Roubaix Femmes.

== Personal life ==
Jastrab's older brother, Ryan Jastrab, is also a cyclist.

== Major results ==
2019
1st Road race, UCI Junior Road World Championships
UCI Junior Track World Championships

1st Madison (with Zoe Ta-Perez)
1st Omnium

National Junior Road Championships

1st Road race
2nd Time trial

1st Overall Healthy Ageing Tour Juniors

1st Points classification
1st Young rider classification
1st Stages 1 & 3

1st Piccolo Trofeo Alfredo Binda
2nd Gent–Wevelgem Junioren
2023
1st Tour de Gatineau
National Collegiate Road Championships

1st Road race
1st Criterium
1st Omnium

2nd Gent–Wevelgem
4th Classic Brugge–De Panne
5th Road race, UCI Under-23 Road World Championships
7th Chrono Féminin de la Gatineau
2026
5th Paris–Roubaix
