= 2023 Omloop Het Nieuwsblad (women's race) =

Bicycle race

2023 UCI Women's World Tour, race 4 of 27
- Previous winners Wout van Aert and Annemiek van Vleuten portrayed on the event poster

Race details
- Dates: 25 February 2023
- Stages: 1
- Distance: 132.3 km (82.2 mi)

Results
	Winner	Lotte Kopecky (BEL)	(SD Worx)
	Second	Lorena Wiebes (NED)	(SD Worx)
	Third	Marta Bastianelli (ITA)	(UAE Team ADQ)

The 2023 Omloop Het Nieuwsblad was the 18th edition of the women's Omloop Het Nieuwsblad road cycling one-day race that took place on 25 February, starting in Ghent and finishing in Ninove. It was the fourth event of the 2023 UCI Women's World Tour.

The race was won by Belgian rider Lotte Kopecky of SD Worx in a solo finish, beating the peloton by 11 seconds.

== Route ==
Running for the first time as a UCI Women's World Tour event, the course covered 132.3 kilometres (82.2 mi). Running from Ghent to Ninove, the course included five cobblestone sections and eight climbs.

== Teams ==
Twenty-four teams participated in the race, including all fifteen UCI Women's WorldTeams and nine UCI Women's Continental Teams.

UCI Women's WorldTeams

- SD Worx
- Movistar Team
- FDJ–Suez
- Trek–Segafredo
- UAE Team ADQ
- Canyon//SRAM
- Team Jumbo–Visma
- Uno-X Pro Cycling Team
- Canyon//SRAM
- Liv Racing TeqFind
- Canyon//SRAM
- Team DSM
- Fenix–Deceuninck
- EF Education–Tibco–SVB
- Human Powered Health
- Team Jayco–AlUla
- Israel Premier Tech Roland

UCI Women's Continental Teams

- AG Insurance–Soudal–Quick-Step
- Parkhotel Valkenburg
- Ceratizit–WNT Pro Cycling
- Duolar-Chevalmeire
- Cofidis
- Lifeplus Wahoo
- Lotto–Dstny Ladies
- Arkéa Pro Cycling Team
- Proximus-Alphamotorhomes-Doltcini

== Result ==
The race was won by Belgian rider Lotte Kopecky of SD Worx in a solo finish, beating the peloton by 11 seconds. Dutch rider Lorena Wiebes of SD Worx won the bunch sprint for second place. Amanda Spratt of Trek–Segafredo retained the leaders jersey of the UCI Women's World Tour.

Final general classification
Rank	Rider	Team	Time
1	Lotte Kopecky (BEL)	SD Worx	3h 33' 55"
2	Lorena Wiebes (NED)	SD Worx	+ 11"
3	Marta Bastianelli (ITA)	UAE Team ADQ	+ 11"
4	Emma Norsgaard (DEN)	Movistar Team	+ 11"
5	Pfeiffer Georgi (GBR)	Team DSM	+ 11"
6	Anouska Koster (NED)	Uno-X Pro Cycling Team	+ 11"
7	Quinty Ton (NED)	Liv Racing TeqFind	+ 11"
8	Christina Schweinberger (AUT)	Fenix–Deceuninck	+ 11"
9	Soraya Paladin (ITA)	Canyon//SRAM	+ 11"
10	Elisa Longo Borghini (ITA)	Trek–Segafredo	+ 11"
