= 2023 Ronde van Drenthe (women's race) =

2023 UCI Women's World Tour, race 6 of 27
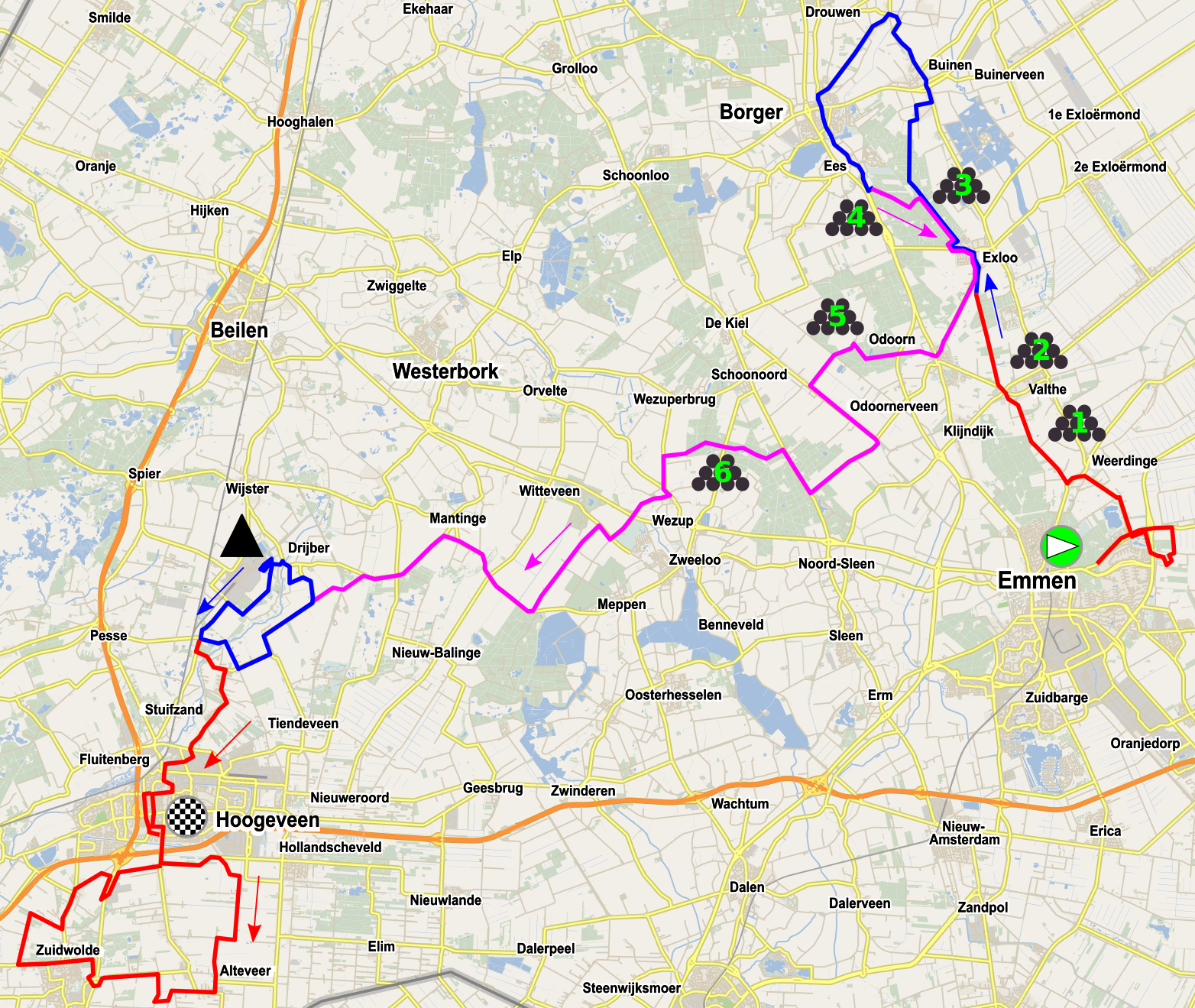
- The planned course, shortened due to snowfall

Race details
- Dates: 11 March 2022
- Stages: 1
- Distance: 94 km (58 mi)
- Winning time: 2h 29' 13"

Results
	Winner	Lorena Wiebes (NED)	(SD Worx)
	Second	Susanne Andersen (NOR)	(Uno-X Pro Cycling Team)
	Third	Maike van der Duin (NED)	(Canyon//SRAM)

The 2023 Ronde van Drenthe was a Dutch road cycling one-day race that took place on 11 March 2023. It was the 16th edition of Ronde van Drenthe and the 6th event of the 2023 UCI Women's World Tour. It was won by Dutch rider Lorena Wiebes of SD Worx in a sprint finish for the third year in succession. The race took place over a shortened course due to overnight snowfall.

== Route ==
The race uses generally flat roads in the Drenthe region of the Netherlands, with the challenge being multiple ascents of the VAMberg - a hill built on a landfill site. The climb is 750m in length with an average gradient of 4.2% and a maximum gradient of 20%. Other difficulties are the ten cobbled sections on the route. The race was originally planned as 152.7 kilometres (94.9 mi) from Emmen to Hoogeveen.

== Summary ==
Due to overnight snowfall, the course was shortened by 60 kilometres (37 mi), by omitting the cobblestone sectors and using six laps around the VAMberg instead. Organisers cleared snow from the VAMberg to allow the race to take place, with riders noting that the roads were wet, but "not so much as to make it dangerous".

After two laps, a breakaway had formed just before a crash split the peloton. After three laps, the front group had gained some riders with a peloton chasing around 30 seconds behind. On the penultimate lap with around 30 kilometres (19 mi), the front group was caught. Multiple riders then attempted to escape the peloton, attacking on the steep slopes on the VAMberg to no avail.

The peloton held to the finish in Hoogeveen, with Lorena Wiebes of SD Worx winning the bunch sprint by several bike lengths. Susanne Andersen of Uno-X Pro Cycling Team finished in second place, with Maike van der Duin of Canyon–SRAM in third. It was the third win in a row at Ronde van Drenthe for Wiebes, equalling the record of Marianne Vos. Wiebes also took the leaders jersey of the UCI Women's World Tour.

== Result ==
Result
Rank	Rider	Team	Time
1	Lorena Wiebes (NED)	SD Worx	2h 29' 13"
2	Susanne Andersen (NOR)	Uno-X Pro Cycling Team	+ 0"
3	Maike van der Duin (NED)	Canyon//SRAM	+ 0"
4	Elisa Balsamo (ITA)	Trek–Segafredo	+ 0"
5	Maria Giulia Confalonieri (ITA)	Uno-X Pro Cycling Team	+ 0"
6	Lotta Henttala (FIN)	AG Insurance–Soudal–Quick-Step	+ 0"
7	Vittoria Guazzini (ITA)	FDJ–Suez	+ 0"
8	Karlijn Swinkels (NED)	Team Jumbo–Visma	+ 0"
9	Letizia Paternoster (ITA)	Team Jayco–AlUla	+ 0"
10	Anna Henderson (GBR)	Team Jumbo–Visma	+ 0"
