= 2023 Strade Bianche Donne =

Cycling race

2023 UCI Women's World Tour, race 5 of 27
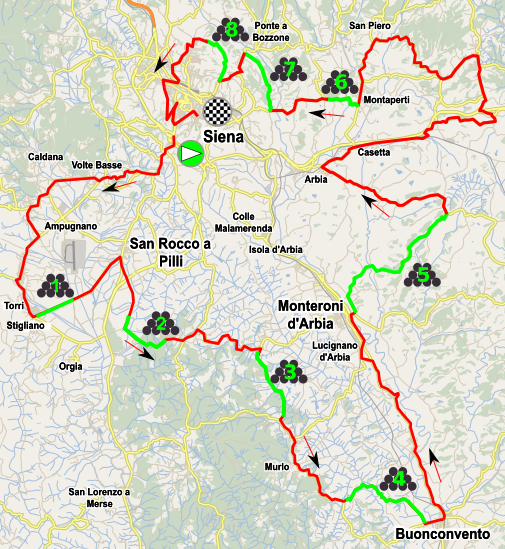

Race details
- Dates: 4 March 2023
- Stages: 1
- Distance: 136 km (85 mi)
- Winning time: 3h 50'55"

Results
	Winner	Demi Vollering (NED)	(SD Worx)
	Second	Lotte Kopecky (BEL)	(SD Worx)
	Third	Cecilie Uttrup Ludwig (DEN)	(FDJ–Suez)

The 2023 Strade Bianche Donne was an Italian road cycling one-day race that took place on 4 March 2023. It was the ninth edition of Strade Bianche Donne and the fifth event of the 2023 UCI Women's World Tour.

The race was won by Dutch rider Demi Vollering, who outsprinted her SD Worx teammate Lotte Kopecky in Siena.

== Route ==
The race starts and finishes in Siena, Italy. The route was identical to that of the previous years, containing 30 km of 'strade bianche' gravel roads spread over eight sectors, for a total distance of 136 km. The final kilometre in Siena to the finish line in the Piazza del Campo has a maximum gradient of 16%.

Sectors of strade bianche
No.	Name	Distance from		Length (km)	Category	Description
No.	Name	Start (km)	Finish (km)	Length (km)	Category	Description
1	Vidritta	17.6	118.4	2.1	*	Perfectly straight and slightly downhill
2	Bagnaia	25	111.0	5.8	*	Short descent followed by a long climb with sections of over 10% gradient
3	Radi	36.9	99.1	4.4	*	A classic gravel section
4	La piana	47.6	88.4	5.5	*	No significant gradient
5	San Martino in Grania	67.5	68.5	9.5	*	A long sector with continuous ups and downs to start with, and ends with a twisting climb
6	Monteaperti	111.3	24.7	0.8	*	Short, but features a double-digit gradient ramp
7	Colle Pinzuto	116.6	19.4	2.4	*	The climb toward Colle Pinzuto, with gradients of up to 15%
8	Le Tolfe	123.6	12.4	1.1	*	A sequence of demanding descents followed by a very punchy climb with a maximum gradient of 18%

== Teams ==
Fourteen UCI Women's WorldTeams and eleven UCI Women's Continental Teams make up the twenty-five teams that will compete in the race.

UCI Women's WorldTeams

- Canyon//SRAM
- EF Education–Tibco–SVB
- FDJ–Suez
- Fenix–Deceuninck
- Israel Premier Tech Roland
- Team Jumbo–Visma
- Liv Racing TeqFind
- Movistar Team
- SD Worx
- Team Jayco–AlUla
- Team DSM
- Trek–Segafredo
- UAE Team ADQ
- Uno-X Pro Cycling Team

UCI Women's Continental Teams

- AG Insurance–Soudal–Quick-Step
- Aromitalia–Basso Bikes–Vaiano
- Bepink
- Born to Win G20 Ambedo
- Ceratizit–WNT Pro Cycling
- Cofidis
- GB Junior Team Piemonte Pedale Castanese A.S.D.
- Isolmant–Premac–Vittoria
- Laboral Kutxa–Fundación Euskadi
- Team Mendelspeck
- Top Girls Fassa Bortolo

== Result ==
Dutch rider Demi Vollering outsprinted her SD Worx teammate Lotte Kopecky at the finish in Siena to win the race. 3rd place rider Kristen Faulkner of Team Jayco–AlUla was later disqualified for wearing a continuous blood glucose monitor - despite the monitor not being used during the race. Amanda Spratt of Trek–Segafredo retained the leaders jersey of the UCI Women's World Tour.

Result
Rank	Rider	Team	Time
1	Demi Vollering (NED)	SD Worx	3h 50' 55"
2	Lotte Kopecky (BEL)	SD Worx	+ 0"
DSQ	~~Kristen Faulkner~~ (USA)	~~Team Jayco–AlUla~~	~~+ 18"~~
3	Cecilie Uttrup Ludwig (DEN)	FDJ–Suez	+ 2'01"
4	Annemiek van Vleuten (NED)	Movistar Team	+ 2'01"
5	Puck Pieterse (NED)	Fenix–Deceuninck	+ 2'15"
6	Katarzyna Niewiadoma (POL)	Canyon//SRAM	+ 2'16"
7	Liane Lippert (GER)	Movistar Team	+ 2'27"
8	Riejanne Markus (NED)	Team Jumbo–Visma	+ 2'36"
9	Pfeiffer Georgi (GBR)	Team DSM	+ 2'39"
10	Floortje Mackaij (NED)	Movistar Team	+ 2'41"
