= Team SD Worx–Protime =

Dutch cycling team

SD Worx

Team information
- UCI code: DOL (2010); DLT (2011–2020) SDW (2021–)
- Registered: Netherlands
- Founded: 2010
- Discipline: Road
- Status: UCI Women's Team (2011–2019); UCI Women's Continental Team (2020); UCI Women's WorldTeam (2021–)
- Bicycles: Specialized
- Components: SRAM
- Website: Team home page

Team name history
- 2010–2011 2012 2013–2020 2021–2023 2024–: Dolmans–Landscaping; Dolmans–Boels; Boels–Dolmans; SD Worx; Team SD Worx–Protime
Team SD Worx–Protime jersey
Jersey

Team SD Worx - Protime (UCI team code: SDW) is a professional cycling team based in the Netherlands, which competes in elite road bicycle racing events such as the UCI Women's World Tour. They topped the UCI Women's World Tour team ranking in 2016–2019 and 2021–2024.

Between 2012 and 2020, the team's title sponsors were the Dutch equipment rental company Boels Rental and Dolmans Landscaping, a Dutch civil engineering company. In February 2020, it was announced that Belgian human resource services company SD Worx would become the title sponsor of the team on a four-year deal from 2021. In 2024 the Belgian workforce management solutions company Protime was added as main sponsor and both SD Worx and Protime extended the contract until 2028.

== History ==
The team was founded in 2010 as the Dolmans Landscaping Team.

=== 2014 ===
At a special press conference in October 2013 it was announced that the Dutch time trial World Champion Ellen van Dijk would join the team after signing a three-year contract, after five years at Specialized–lululemon. On 1 March Sanne van Paassen (Rabobank-Liv Woman Cycling Team) joined the team. After winning the Omloop van het Hageland in early March, Lizzie Armitstead also won the first World Cup race, the Ronde van Drenthe. She would finish later three times in second place in the later World Cup races and keeping the lead in the overall World Cup classification. At the beginning of April, after a solo of some 30 kilometres (19 miles), Ellen van Dijk won the Tour of Flanders World Cup race.

=== 2015 ===
The team started the season with the Ladies Tour of Qatar. Ellen van Dijk won the second stage and took the lead in the general classification.

=== 2016 ===
In preparation for the 2017 season, the team signed Anna van der Breggen from Rabobank-Liv Woman Cycling Team. The team also extended the contracts of Megan Guarnier, Chantal Blaak, Christine Majerus, Amalie Dideriksen, Nikki Brammeier, Lizzie Armitstead and Karol-Ann Canuel. Ellen Van Dijk left the team to join Team Liv–Plantur. On 11 August, Evelyn Stevens announced she would retire at the end of the season.

=== 2021 ===
In 2021, the team won seven events including Strade Bianche Donne, Liège–Bastogne–Liège Femmes, La Course by Le Tour de France and The Women's Tour. The team won the UCI Women's World Tour, team classification for the fifth time in six seasons. Anna van der Breggen retired at the end of the season, but continued to work for the team as directeur sportif.

=== 2022 ===
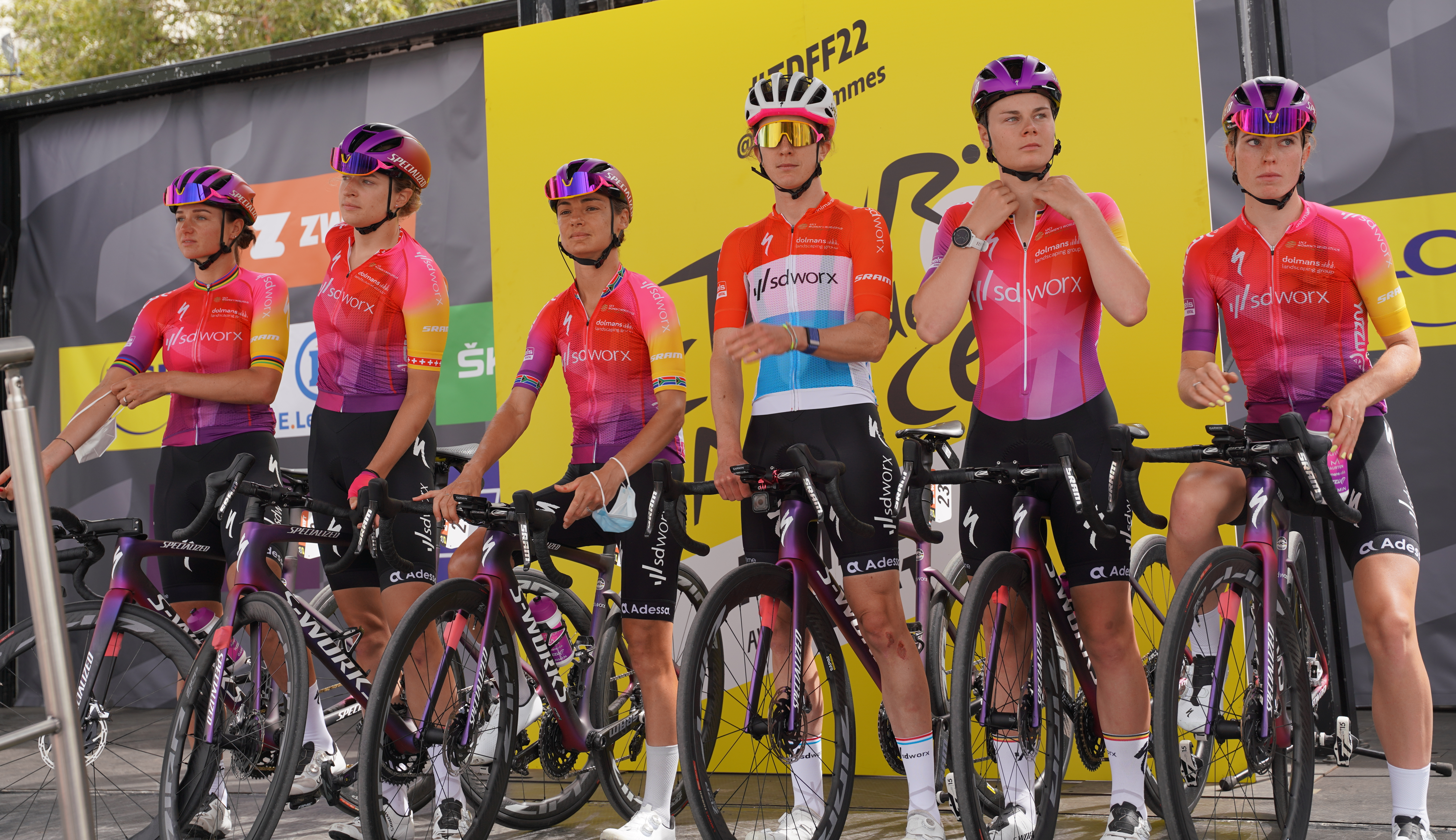
Riders at the 2022 Tour de France Femmes.

In 2022, the team won the UCI Women's World Tour team classification for the sixth time in seven seasons. In August 2022, it was announced that Dutch sprinter Lorena Wiebes had signed a contract with the team.

=== 2023 ===
In 2023, the team dominated the UCI Women's World Tour, winning 15 races including Strade Bianche Donne, Tour of Flanders, all three Ardennes classics and the Tour de France Femmes. At the Tour, the team dominated the event, with 1st (Demi Vollering) and 2nd place (Lotte Kopecky) in the overall classification, 1st in the points classification (Kopecky), four stage wins, as well as the team classification. The team won both the individual classification with Demi Vollering, as well as the team classification.

=== 2024 ===
In 2024, the team again dominated the UCI Women's World Tour, winning 14 races including Strade Bianche Donne, Paris–Roubaix Femmes and the La Vuelta Femenina. The team missed out on winning the Tour de France Femmes by four seconds, after a crash for Vollering early in the race. The team won the UCI Women's World Tour individual classification with Lotte Kopecky, as well as the team classification. In October 2024, Vollering announced that she would be leaving the team at the end of the season, joining FDJ–Suez.

=== 2025 ===
Anna van der Breggen returned to the professional peloton for the 2025 season with her former team.

== Team roster ==
As of 9 August 2026.

Rider	Date of birth
Mischa Bredewold (NED)	20 June 2000 (age 26)
Valentina Cavallar (AUT)	7 March 2001 (age 25)
Elena Cecchini (ITA)	25 May 1992 (age 34)
Femke Gerritse (NED)	14 May 2001 (age 25)
Barbara Guarischi (ITA)	2 October 1990 (age 36)
Steffi Häberlin (SUI)	11 December 1997 (age 28)
Mikayla Harvey (NZL)	7 September 1998 (age 28)
Julia Kopecký (CZE)	10 August 2004 (age 22)
Lotte Kopecky (BEL)	10 November 1995 (age 30)

Rider	Date of birth
Marta Lach (POL)	26 May 1997 (age 29)
Femke Markus (NED)	17 November 1996 (age 29)
Marie Schreiber (LUX)	17 April 2003 (age 23)
Lisa van Belle (NED)	30 January 2004 (age 22)
Anna van der Breggen (NED)	18 April 1990 (age 36)
Blanka Vas (HUN)	3 September 2001 (age 25)
Nienke Vinke (NED)	22 June 2004 (age 22)
Lorena Wiebes (NED)	17 March 1999 (age 27)

== Major wins ==
2010
Noord-Nederland Regional Road Race Championships, Janneke Ensing
2011
Halle-Buizingen, Martine Bras
Bredene, Winanda Spoor
Noord-Nederland Regional Time Trial Championships, Janneke Ensing
Oost-Nederland Regional Road Race, Geerike Schreurs
Stage 4 Tour de Feminin – Krasna Lipa, Mascha Pijnenborg
Stage 3 Tour Féminin en Limousin, Martine Bras
2012
Tour de Free State, Laura van der Kamp
2013
Provincial Time Trial Championship (Limburg), Jessie Daams
Combativity award Stage 2 Energiewacht Tour, Lizzie Armitstead
Sprints classification Holland Ladies Tour, Lizzie Armitstead

Combination classification, Lizzie Armitstead

2014
Omloop van het Hageland, Lizzie Armitstead
Ronde van Drenthe World Cup, Lizzie Armitstead
Tour of Flanders, Ellen van Dijk
Otley Grand Prix, Lizzie Armitstead
Profronde van Heerlen, Ellen van Dijk
Points classification Internationale Thüringen Rundfahrt der Frauen, Lizzie Armitstead

Mountains classification, Lizzie Armitstead
Stage 2 Combativity award, Romy Kasper
Stage 1, Lizzie Armitstead
Stage 2, Romy Kasper

Overall UCI Women's Road World Cup, Lizzie Armitstead
Stage 1 (ITT) Holland Ladies Tour, Ellen van Dijk
Grand Prix Galychyna (Scratch race), Katarzyna Pawłowska
Grand Prix Galychyna (Omnium), Katarzyna Pawłowska
2015
Revolution – Manchester (Round 3) (Points race), Lizzie Armitstead
Revolution – Glasgow (Round 4) (Points race), Lizzie Armitstead
Overall Ladies Tour of Qatar, Lizzie Armitstead

Points classification, Lizzie Armitstead
Stage 2, Ellen van Dijk
Stages 3 & 4, Lizzie Armitstead

Le Samyn des Dames, Chantal Blaak
Strade Bianche, Megan Guarnier
Trofeo Alfredo Binda-Comune di Cittiglio, Lizzie Armitstead
Tour of California Women's Time Trial, Evelyn Stevens
Holland Hills Classic, Lizzie Armitstead
Philadelphia Cycling Classic, Lizzie Armitstead
Stage 1 Emakumeen Euskal Bira, Megan Guarnier
Stage 3 Emakumeen Euskal Bira, Chantal Blaak
Stage 1 The Women's Tour, Lizzie Armitstead
Stage 3 The Women's Tour, Christine Majerus
Stage 2 Giro d'Italia Femminile, Megan Guarnier
Mountains classification Tour de Bretagne Féminin, Christine Majerus
2016
Stage 2 Ladies Tour of Qatar, Ellen van Dijk
Omloop Het Nieuwsblad, Lizzie Armitstead
Strade Bianche, Lizzie Armitstead
Le Samyn des Dames, Chantal Blaak
Ronde van Drenthe, Chantal Blaak
Trofeo Alfredo Binda-Comune di Cittiglio, Lizzie Armitstead
Tour of Flanders, Lizzie Armitstead
Gent–Wevelgem, Chantal Blaak
Overall Energiewacht Tour, Ellen van Dijk

Team classification
Stage 1, Team time trial
Stage 2, Chantal Blaak
Stage 4b (ITT), Ellen van Dijk

Overall Tour of California, Megan Guarnier

Points classification, Megan Guarnier
Stage 1, Megan Guarnier

Holland Hills Classic, Lizzie Armitstead
Philadelphia International Cycling Classic, Megan Guarnier
Overall The Women's Tour, Lizzie Armitstead

Best British rider classification, Lizzie Armitstead
Stage 1, Christine Majerus
Stage 3, Lizzie Armitstead

Overall Giro d'Italia Femminile, Megan Guarnier

Stages 2, 6 & 7 (ITT), Evelyn Stevens

Stage 4 (ITT) Thüringen Rundfahrt der Frauen, Ellen van Dijk
Crescent Women World Cup Vårgårda TTT, Team time trial
Overall UCI Women's World Tour, Megan Guarnier
Stage 1 Holland Ladies Tour, Amalie Dideriksen
Stage 2 Holland Ladies Tour, Team time trial
Stages 1 & 2 Tour Cycliste Féminin International de l'Ardèche, Katarzyna Pawłowska
2017
Ronde van Drenthe, Amy Pieters
Stage 1b Healthy Ageing Tour, Amy Pieters
Stage 2 Healthy Ageing Tour, Team time trial
Stage 4 Healthy Ageing Tour, Chantal Blaak
Amstel Gold Race, Anna van der Breggen
La Flèche Wallonne Féminine, Anna van der Breggen
Liège–Bastogne–Liège Femmes, Anna van der Breggen
Women's Tour de Yorkshire, Lizzie Deignan
Overall Grand Prix Elsy Jacobs, Christine Majerus

Stage 1, Christine Majerus

Overall Tour of California, Anna van der Breggen

Stage 1, Megan Guarnier

Zuid-Holland Regional Time Trial Championships, Chantal Blaak
Stage 2 The Women's Tour, Amy Pieters
Overall Giro d'Italia Femminile, Anna van der Breggen

Stage 1, Team time trial
Stage 10, Megan Guarnier

Daags na de Tour, Chantal Blaak
Paardenmarktronde van Alblasserdam, Chantal Blaak
CityRonde Tiel, Chantal Blaak
Crescent Vårgårda TTT, Team time trial
Stage 3 Ladies Tour of Norway, Megan Guarnier
Young rider classification Holland Ladies Tour, Demi de Jong

Team classification
Stage 5, Anna van der Breggen

Overall UCI Women's World Tour, Anna van der Breggen
2018
Strade Bianche Donne, Anna van der Breggen
Ronde van Drenthe, Amy Pieters
Tour of Flanders for Women, Anna van der Breggen
Overall Healthy Ageing Tour, Amy Pieters

Team classification
Stage 1 (ITT), Anna van der Breggen
Stage 2, Amy Pieters

Amstel Gold Race, Chantal Blaak
La Flèche Wallonne Féminine, Anna van der Breggen
Liège–Bastogne–Liège Femmes, Anna van der Breggen
Stage 1 Festival Elsy Jacobs, Christine Majerus
Overall Women's Tour de Yorkshire, Megan Guarnier

Mountains classification, Megan Guarnier
Stage 2, Megan Guarnier

Durango-Durango Emakumeen Saria, Anna van der Breggen
Stage 3 Emakumeen Euskal Bira, Amy Pieters
Stage 4 The Women's Tour, Amalie Dideriksen
Crescent Vårgårda TTT, Team time trial
GP de Plouay – Bretagne, Amy Pieters
Stages 3 & 4 Holland Ladies Tour, Amalie Dideriksen
Stage 5 Holland Ladies Tour, Chantal Blaak
2019
Omloop Het Nieuwsblad, Chantal Blaak
Le Samyn, Jip van den Bos
La Flèche Wallonne Féminine, Anna van der Breggen
Points classification Women's Tour de Yorkshire, Christine Majerus
Overall Tour of California, Anna van der Breggen

Sprint classification, Anna van der Breggen
Stage 1, Anna van der Breggen
Stage 2, Katie Hall

Stage 1 Emakumeen Euskal Bira, Jolien D'Hoore
Stages 1 & 3 The Women's Tour, Jolien D'Hoore
Stage 6 The Women's Tour, Amy Pieters
Stage 9 Giro Rosa, Anna van der Breggen
GP de Plouay – Bretagne, Anna van der Breggen
Overall Holland Ladies Tour, Christine Majerus

Team classification

Grand Prix International d'Isbergues, Christine Majerus
2020
Overall Setmana Ciclista Valenciana, Anna van der Breggen

Stage 2, Anna van der Breggen

La Flèche Wallonne Féminine, Anna van der Breggen
Le Samyn, Chantal Blaak
Overall Giro Rosa, Anna van der Breggen
Gent–Wevelgem, Jolien D'Hoore
Tour of Flanders, Chantal van den Broek-Blaak
2021
Omloop Het Nieuwsblad, Anna van der Breggen
Strade Bianche, Chantal van den Broek-Blaak
Stage 1 Healthy Ageing Tour, Jolien D'Hoore
Stage 3 Healthy Ageing Tour, Lonneke Uneken
Nokere Koerse, Amy Pieters
Omloop van de Westhoek – Memorial Stive Vermaut, Christine Majerus
La Flèche Wallonne Féminine, Anna van der Breggen
Liège–Bastogne–Liège Femmes, Demi Vollering
Gran Premio Ciudad de Eibar, Anna van der Breggen
Durango-Durango Emakumeen Saria, Anna van der Breggen
Dwars door het Hageland WE, Chantal van den Broek-Blaak
La Course by Le Tour de France, Demi Vollering
Overall Giro Rosa, Anna van der Breggen

Stages 1 & 4 (ITT), Anna van der Breggen
Stage 9, Ashleigh Moolman

Stage 3 BeNe Ladies Tour, Lonneke Uneken
Overall Holland Ladies Tour, Chantal van den Broek-Blaak

Stage 3, Lonneke Uneken

Overall The Women's Tour, Demi Vollering

Stage 2, Amy Pieters
Stage 3, Demi Vollering

2022
Stage 2 Bloeizone Fryslân Tour, Lonneke Uneken
Strade Bianche, Lotte Kopecky
Drentse Acht van Westerveld, Christine Majerus
Tour of Flanders, Lotte Kopecky
Brabantse Pijl, Demi Vollering
Youth classification Grand Prix Elsy Jacobs, Niamh Fisher-Black
Overall Itzulia Women, Demi Vollering

Points classification, Demi Vollering
Youth classification, Niamh Fisher-Black
Stages 1, 2 & 3, Demi Vollering

Points classification Vuelta a Burgos Feminas, Lotte Kopecky

Mountains classification, Demi Vollering
Team classification
Stage 1, Lotte Kopecky
Stage 4, Demi Vollering

2023
Stage 2 UAE Tour Women, Lorena Wiebes
Omloop Het Nieuwsblad, Lotte Kopecky
Strade Bianche, Demi Vollering
Ronde van Drenthe, Lorena Wiebes
Gent-Wevelgem, Marlen Reusser
Tour of Flanders, Lotte Kopecky
Amstel Gold Race, Demi Vollering
La Flèche Wallonne, Demi Vollering
Liège–Bastogne–Liège, Demi Vollering
Overall Itzulia Women, Marlen Reusser

Points classification, Marlen Reusser
Mountains classification, Demi Vollering
Stages 1 & 2, Demi Vollering
Stage 3, Marlen Reusser

Overall Vuelta a Burgos Feminas, Demi Vollering

Points classification, Lorena Wiebes
Mountains classification, Demi Vollering
Stages 1 & 3 Lotte Kopecky
Stages 2 & 4 Demi Vollering

Overall Tour de France Femmes, Demi Vollering

Points classification, Lotte Kopecky
Team classification
Stage 1 Lotte Kopecky
Stage 3 Lorena Wiebes
Stage 7 Demi Vollering
Stage 8 Marlen Reusser

1st Overall Tour de Romandie Women, Demi Vollering

1st Stage 2, Demi Vollering

2024
Strade Bianche, Lotte Kopecky
Ronde van Drenthe, Lorena Wiebes
Gent–Wevelgem, Lorena Wiebes
Paris–Roubaix, Lotte Kopecky
Overall La Vuelta Femenina, Demi Vollering

Mountains classification, Demi Vollering
Stage 3 & 8 Demi Vollering

Overall Itzulia Women, Demi Vollering

Points classification, Demi Vollering
Mountains classification, Demi Vollering
Stages 1 & 2, Mischa Bredewold
Stage 3, Demi Vollering

Overall Vuelta a Burgos Feminas, Demi Vollering

Points classification, Demi Vollering
Mountains classification, Demi Vollering
Stages 2 & 4 Demi Vollering
Stages 3 Lorena Wiebes

Overall RideLondon Classique, Lorena Wiebes

Sprint classification, Lorena Wiebes
Stages 1, 2 & 3 Lorena Wiebes

== National, continental and world champions ==
2010
Netherlands Track (Scratch race), Winanda Spoor
2012
Azerbaijan Time Trial, Elena Tchalykh
2013
British National Road Race, Lizzie Armitstead
2014
Luxembourg Cyclo-cross, Christine Majerus
Luxembourg Time Trial, Christine Majerus
Luxembourg Road Race, Christine Majerus
2015
Luxembourg Cyclo-cross, Christine Majerus
Luxembourg Time Trial, Christine Majerus
Luxembourg Road Race, Christine Majerus
USA Road Race, Megan Guarnier
Denmark Road Race, Amalie Dideriksen
British Road Race, Lizzie Armitstead
European U23 Track (Pursuit), Amalie Dideriksen
European U23 Track (Omnium), Amalie Dideriksen
World Road Race, Lizzie Armitstead
European Track (Points race), Katarzyna Pawłowska
2016
World Track (Points race), Katarzyna Pawłowska
Luxembourg Cyclo-cross, Christine Majerus
British Cyclo-cross, Nikki Harris
USA Road Race, Megan Guarnier
Luxembourg Time Trial, Christine Majerus
Luxembourg Road Race, Christine Majerus
European Time Trial, Ellen van Dijk
World Road Race, Amalie Dideriksen
Denmark Track (Omnium), Amalie Dideriksen
Denmark Track (Points race), Amalie Dideriksen
Denmark Track (Individual pursuit), Amalie Dideriksen
Denmark Track (Scratch race), Amalie Dideriksen
Denmark Track (Individual sprint), Amalie Dideriksen
2017
Luxembourg Cyclo-cross, Christine Majerus
British Cyclo-cross, Nikki Brammier
Poland Time Trial, Katarzyna Pawłowska
Luxembourg Time Trial, Christine Majerus
British Road Race, Lizzie Armitstead
Dutch Road Race, Chantal Blaak
Luxembourg Road Race, Christine Majerus
Canada Time Trial, Karol-Ann Canuel
Denmark Track (Omnium), Amalie Dideriksen
World Road Race, Chantal Blaak
Poland Track (Omnium), Katarzyna Pawłowska
Dutch Track (Individual pursuit), Amy Pieters
2018
Luxembourg Cyclo-cross, Christine Majerus
Luxembourg Time Trial, Christine Majerus
Denmark Road Race, Amalie Dideriksen
Dutch Road Race, Chantal Blaak
Luxembourg Road Race, Christine Majerus
World Road Race, Anna van der Breggen
Dutch Track (Individual pursuit), Amy Pieters
2019
Luxembourg Cyclo-cross, Christine Majerus
Switzerland Road Race, Marlen Reusser
European Track (Madison), Amalie Dideriksen
World Track (Madison), Amy Pieters

2020
Luxembourg Cyclo-cross, Christine Majerus
Denmark Time Trial, Amalie Dideriksen
Luxembourg Time Trial, Christine Majerus
Luxembourg Road Race, Christine Majerus
Dutch Road Race, Anna van der Breggen
World Time Trial, Anna van der Breggen
World Road Race, Anna van der Breggen
World Track (Madison), Amy Pieters

2021
Czech Time Trial, Nikola Nosková
Hungary Time Trial, Blanka Vas
Luxembourg Time Trial, Christine Majerus
Dutch Time Trial, Anna van der Breggen
Dutch Road Race, Amy Pieters
Hungary Road Race, Blanka Vas
Luxembourg Road Race, Christine Majerus
British U23 Time Trial, Anna Shackley
Switzerland Road Race, Marlen Reusser
World Track (Madison), Amy Pieters
European Time trial, Marlen Reusser

2022
Hungary Time Trial, Blanka Vas
Hungary Road Race, Blanka Vas
Belgium Time Trial, Lotte Kopecky
Luxembourg Time Trial, Christine Majerus
Luxembourg Road Race, Christine Majeru
European Time trial, Marlen Reusser

2023
Luxembourg Time Trial, Christine Majerus
Luxembourg Road Race, Christine Majerus
Belgium Time Trial, Lotte Kopecky
Belgium Road Race, Lotte Kopecky
Hungary Time Trial, Blanka Vas
Hungary Road Race, Blanka Vas
Dutch Road Race, Demi Vollering
Switzerland Road Race, Marlen Reusser
European Time trial, Marlen Reusser
European Road race, Mischa Bredewold
World Road race, Lotte Kopecky

2024
Luxembourg Time Trial, Christine Majerus
Luxembourg Road Race, Marie Schreiber
Belgium Time Trial, Lotte Kopecky
Belgium Road Race, Lotte Kopecky
Dutch Road Race, Chantal van den Broek-Blaak
Hungary Road Race, Blanka Vas
