= Pfeiffer Georgi =

English cyclist (born 2000)

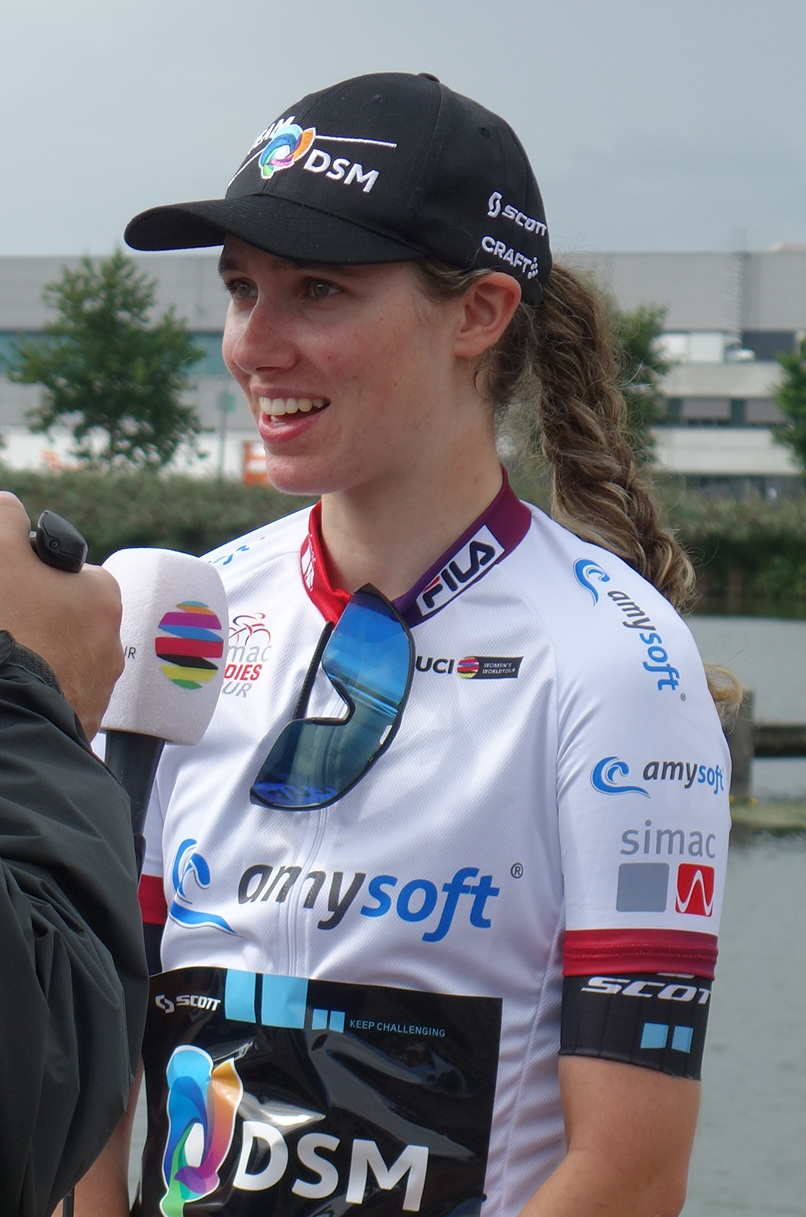
- Georgi in 2021

Personal information
- Full name: Pfeiffer Zara Georgi
- Nickname: PG
- Born: 27 September 2000 (age 26) Herne Hill, London, England
- Height: 1.73 m (5 ft 8 in)

Cycling career
- Sport: Cycling
- Current team: Team Picnic–PostNL
- Discipline: Road
- Role: Rider
- Rider type: Classics specialist

Professional team
- 2019–: Team Sunweb

Major wins
- One-day races and Classics National Road Race Championships (2021, 2023, 2024) Classic Brugge–De Panne (2023)
Medal record
Women's track cycling
Representing Great Britain
European Championships
Silver medal – second place	2022 Munich	Elimination race
Women's road cycling
Representing Great Britain
World Championships
Silver medal – second place	2022 Wollongong	Under-23 road race

Pfeiffer Zara Georgi (born 27 September 2000) is an English professional racing cyclist, who currently rides for UCI Women's WorldTeam Team Picnic–PostNL. She won the 2021, 2023 and 2024 British National Road Race Championships.

== Career ==
In 2017 she won the Gent–Wevelgem junior race and came second overall in the EPZ Omloop van Borsele. In 2018, she won the junior races Trofeo Da Moreno (junior race of Trofeo Alfredo Binda), Healthy Ageing Tour, and Watersley Ladies Challenge. In September 2021, she took her first professional win at La Choralis Fourmies Feminine in France, and the following month Georgi won the women's road race in the National Road Championships. She competed in the 2021 UCI Road World Championships, where she worked as a domestique in the road race with responsibility for leading Lizzie Deignan into the course's climbs, earning praise from the latter.

Representing Great Britain, Georgi finished 5th in the road race at the 2024 Paris Olympics.

The same month, Georgi was forced to abandon the 2024 Tour de France Femmes after a crash on stage five, in which she broke her hand and fractured her neck.

== Personal life ==
Georgi was born in Herne Hill, London to father Peter, who races at masters level, and mother Louise, who is an amateur cyclist. Her older brother Etienne cycled for Team Wiggins Le Col in 2017–2018. Her paternal grandfather was of Greek-Cypriot origin.

The family later moved to Berkeley from where Georgi raced on the Castle Combe Circuit, making her debut there at the age of six.

In 2020 she broke two vertebrae in a crash during Classic Brugge–De Panne, a race in Belgium she went on to win in 2023, recording her first victory in the Women's WorldTour.

As of 2024, Georgi lives in Andorra.

== Major results ==
=== Road ===
2017
1st Gent–Wevelgem Juniors
2nd Overall EPZ Omloop van Borsele Juniors

1st Points classification
1st Young rider classification

UCI World Junior Championships

6th Road race
7th Time trial

10th Trofeo Alfredo Binda Juniors
2018
1st Overall Healthy Ageing Tour

1st Stage 2

1st Overall Watersley Ladies Challenge

1st Stage 1

1st Trofeo Alfredo Binda Juniors
2nd Overall EPZ Omloop van Borsele Juniors
4th Time trial, UCI World Junior Championships
2019
3rd Time trial, National Under-23 Championships
8th Road race, UEC European Under-23 Championships
2021
1st Road race, National Championships
1st La Choralis Fourmies
2nd Time trial, National Under-23 Championships
4th Overall Kreiz Breizh Elites Dames
5th GP Eco-Struct
6th Ronde van Drenthe
6th Overall Holland Ladies Tour

1st Young rider classification

8th Overall The Women's Tour
2022
1st Time trial, National Under-23 Championships
2nd Road race, UCI World Under-23 Championships
2nd Road race, National Championships
4th Dwars door Vlaanderen
5th Overall BeNe Ladies Tour

1st Young rider classification

6th GP Eco-Struct
9th Omloop van het Hageland
9th Paris–Roubaix
9th Binche–Chimay–Binche
2023
National Championships

1st Road race
4th Time trial

1st Classic Brugge–De Panne
1st Binche–Chimay–Binche
1st Dwars door de Westhoek
4th Road race, UEC European Championships
5th Omloop Het Nieuwsblad
7th Amstel Gold Race
8th Paris–Roubaix
9th Strade Bianche
2024
National Championships

1st Road race
4th Time trial

3rd Paris–Roubaix
4th Amstel Gold Race
5th Road race, Olympic Games
2025
3rd Time trial, National Championships
7th Omloop Het Nieuwsblad
10th Overall UAE Tour
2026
4th Road race, National Championships

=== Track ===
2017
National Championships

1st Madison (with Anna Docherty)
3rd Team pursuit

2018
3rd Team pursuit, National Championships
2022
2nd Elimination, UEC European Championships
