= 2026 Liège–Bastogne–Liège Femmes =

Cycling race

2026 UCI Women's World Tour, race 15 of 26
- Official event poster

Race details
- Dates: 26 April 2026
- Stages: 1
- Distance: 156 km (97 mi)
- Winning time: 4h 10' 22"

Results
	Winner	Demi Vollering (NED)	(FDJ United–Suez)
	Second	Puck Pieterse (NED)	(Fenix–Premier Tech)
	Third	Katarzyna Niewiadoma-Phinney (POL)	(Canyon//SRAM Zondacrypto)

The 2026 Liège–Bastogne–Liège Femmes was a Belgian road cycling one-day race that took place on 26 April. It was the 10th edition of Liège–Bastogne–Liège Femmes and the 15th event of the 2026 UCI Women's World Tour. It was the finale of the Ardennes classics, following the Amstel Gold Race Ladies Edition and La Flèche Wallonne Femmes. The 156-kilometre (97 mi) route ran from Bastogne to Liège, using the second half of the men's route.

The race was won by Dutch rider Demi Vollering of FDJ United–Suez for the third time, following previous wins in 2023 and 2021. Vollering attacked on Côte de La Redoute with around 35 kilometres (22 mi) and soloed to victory, winning by nearly 90 seconds ahead of Puck Pieterse and Katarzyna Niewiadoma-Phinney.

== Pre-race favorites ==
Demi Vollering, a two-time winner of the race (2021, 2023), was the top favorite after winning the La Flèche Wallonne Femmes earlier in the week. Defending champion Kim Le Court-Pienaar was unable to defend her title after fracturing her wrist at the Tour of Flanders. Other contenders included Pauline Ferrand-Prévot, Puck Pieterse, Lotte Kopecky, Katarzyna Niewiadoma-Phinney, Anna van der Breggen, and Paula Blasi.

== Teams ==
21 teams took part in the race.

UCI Women's WorldTeams

- AG Insurance–Soudal
- Canyon//SRAM Zondacrypto
- EF Education–Oatly
- FDJ United–Suez
- Fenix–Premier Tech
- Human Powered Health
- Lidl–Trek
- Liv AlUla Jayco
- Movistar Team
- Team Picnic–PostNL
- Team SD Worx–Protime
- UAE Team ADQ
- Uno-X Mobility
- Visma–Lease a Bike

UCI Women's ProTeams

- Cofidis
- Laboral Kutxa–Fundación Euskadi
- Lotto–Intermarché Ladies
- St. Michel–Preference Home–Auber93
- VolkerWessels Cycling Team

UCI Women's Continental Teams

- Ma Petite Entreprise
- Mayenne Monbana My Pie

== Result ==
Result
Rank	Rider	Team	Time
1	Demi Vollering (NED)	FDJ United–Suez	4h 10' 22"
2	Puck Pieterse (NED)	Fenix–Premier Tech	+ 1' 29"
3	Katarzyna Niewiadoma-Phinney (POL)	Canyon//SRAM Zondacrypto	+ 1' 29"
4	Anna van der Breggen (NED)	Team SD Worx–Protime	+ 1' 29"
5	Paula Blasi (ESP)	UAE Team ADQ	+ 1' 48"
6	Isabella Holmgren (CAN)	Lidl–Trek	+ 1' 48"
7	Elise Chabbey (SUI)	FDJ United–Suez	+ 1' 56"
8	Magdeleine Vallieres (CAN)	EF Education–Oatly	+ 1' 56"
9	Juliette Berthet (FRA)	FDJ United–Suez	+ 1' 56"
10	Axelle Dubau-Prévot (FRA)	EF Education–Oatly	+ 1' 56"
