= 2023 Liège–Bastogne–Liège Femmes =

Cycling race

2023 UCI Women's World Tour, race 14 of 27
- Race poster

Race details
- Dates: 23 April 2023
- Distance: 142.8 km (88.7 mi)
- Winning time: 3h 50' 47"

Results
	Winner	Demi Vollering (NED)	(SD Worx)
	Second	Elisa Longo Borghini (ITA)	(Trek–Segafredo)
	Third	Marlen Reusser (SUI)	(SD Worx)

The 2023 Liège–Bastogne–Liège Femmes was a Belgian road cycling one-day race that took place on 23 April 2023. It was the 7th edition of Liège–Bastogne–Liège Femmes and the 14th event of the 2023 UCI Women's World Tour. The race was won for the second time by Dutch rider Demi Vollering of SD Worx, who won the triple crown of the Ardennes classics.

== Route ==
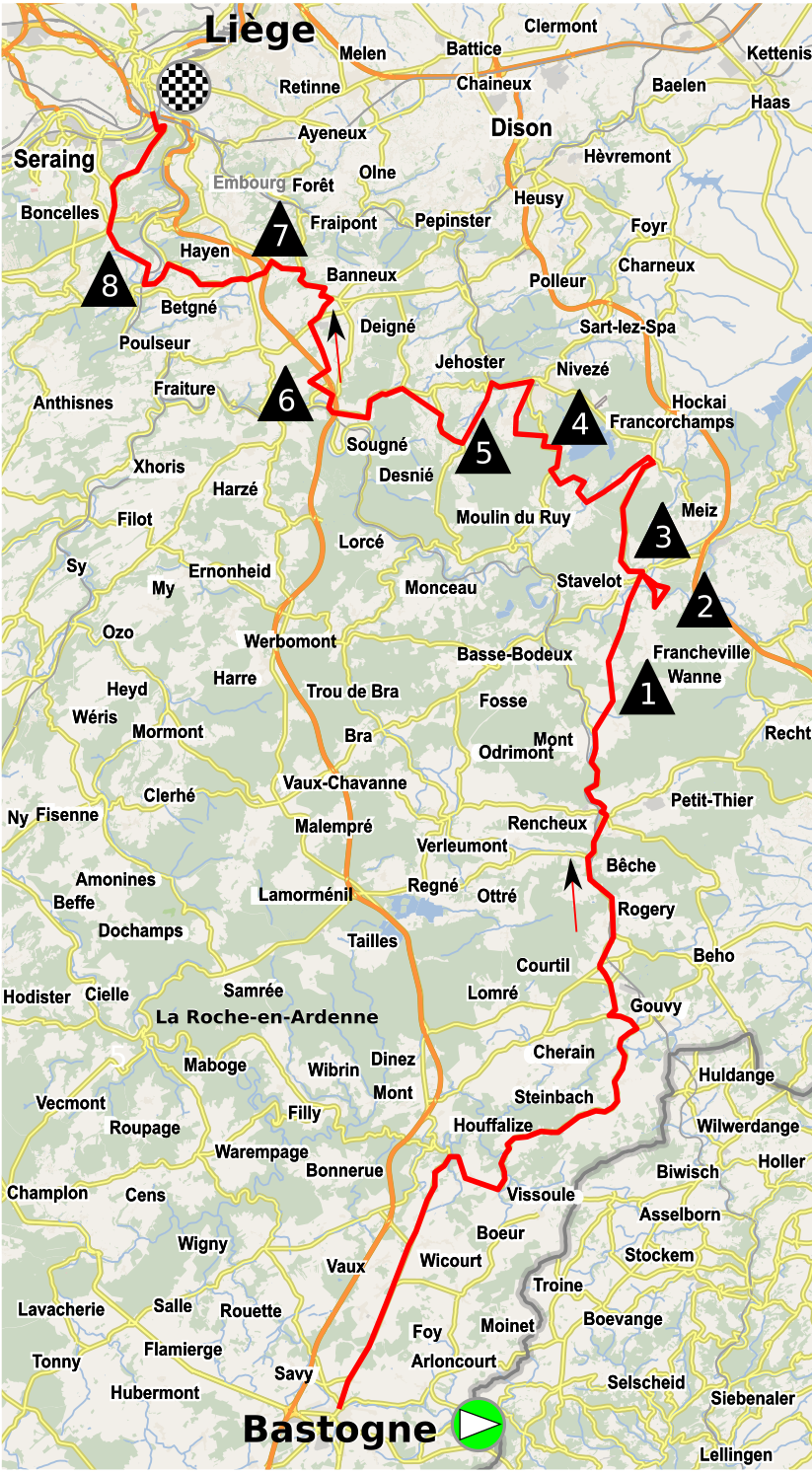
Route map

With a route similar to the previous editions of the race, the race started in Bastogne and finished in Liège, at the same location as the men's race. At 142.8 km (88.7 mi), the race was approximately half the distance of the men's event.

The route featured eight categorised climbs: the Côte de Mont-Le-Soie, Côte de Wanne, Côte de la Haute-Levée, Col de Rosier, Côte de Desnié, Côte de La Redoute, Côte des Forges and Côte de la Roche aux Faucons.

== Summary ==
In the lead up to the race, Demi Vollering of SD Worx was considered to be the favourite, following victories at Amstel Gold Race and La Flèche Wallonne Féminine. Annemiek van Vleuten of Movistar had not won major events in 2023, but was considered a favourite in light of two previous victories in the event. Outsiders for the win included Silvia Persico of UAE Team ADQ, Elisa Longo Borghini of Trek–Segafredo and Liane Lippert of Movistar.

On the decisive climb of the Côte de La Redoute, Marlen Reusser of SD Worx attacked from a five rider breakaway. She quickly gained a 45 second lead, with a subsequent attack from Annemiek van Vleuten splitting the peloton behind.

On the Roche aux Faucons, Longo Borghini attacked from a chasing group, catching Reusser. Following the climb, Vollering caught them, with Reusser then dropping back to the chasing group. In the closing kilometres, Vollering and Longo Borghini worked together to hold off the small group. In the final sprint, Longo Borghini went first, but Vollering overtook her with 50 metres to go, winning the race. Reusser took third place, winning the sprint of the chasing pack 22 seconds behind.

Vollering's victory was her second Liège–Bastogne–Liège Femmes, following her 2021 victory. She also became only the second woman to win the Ardennes classics triple - following Anna van der Breggen in 2017.

== Result ==
Result
Rank	Rider	Team	Time
1	Demi Vollering (NED)	SD Worx	3h 50' 47"
2	Elisa Longo Borghini (ITA)	Trek–Segafredo	+ 0"
3	Marlen Reusser (SUI)	SD Worx	+ 22"
4	Riejanne Markus (NED)	Team Jumbo–Visma	+ 22"
5	Elise Chabbey (SUI)	Canyon//SRAM	+ 22"
6	Annemiek Van Vleuten (NED)	Movistar Team	+ 22'
7	Gaia Realini (ITA)	Trek–Segafredo	+ 25"
8	Liane Lippert (GER)	Movistar Team	+ 1' 24"
9	Soraya Paladin (ITA)	Canyon//SRAM	+ 1' 24"
10	Niamh Fisher-Black (NZL)	SD Worx	+ 1' 24"
