= 2022 Liège–Bastogne–Liège Femmes =

Cycling race

2022 UCI Women's World Tour, race 10 of 23
- Race poster

Race details
- Dates: 24 April 2022
- Distance: 142.5 km (88.5 mi)
- Winning time: 3h 52' 32"

Results
	Winner	Annemiek van Vleuten (NED)	(Movistar Team)
	Second	Grace Brown (AUS)	(FDJ Nouvelle-Aquitaine Futuroscope)
	Third	Demi Vollering (NED)	(SD Worx)

The 2022 Liège–Bastogne–Liège Femmes was a Belgian road cycling one-day race that took place on 24 April 2022. It was the 6th edition of Liège–Bastogne–Liège Femmes and the 10th event of the 2022 UCI Women's World Tour. The race was won for the second time by Dutch rider Annemiek van Vleuten.

== Route ==
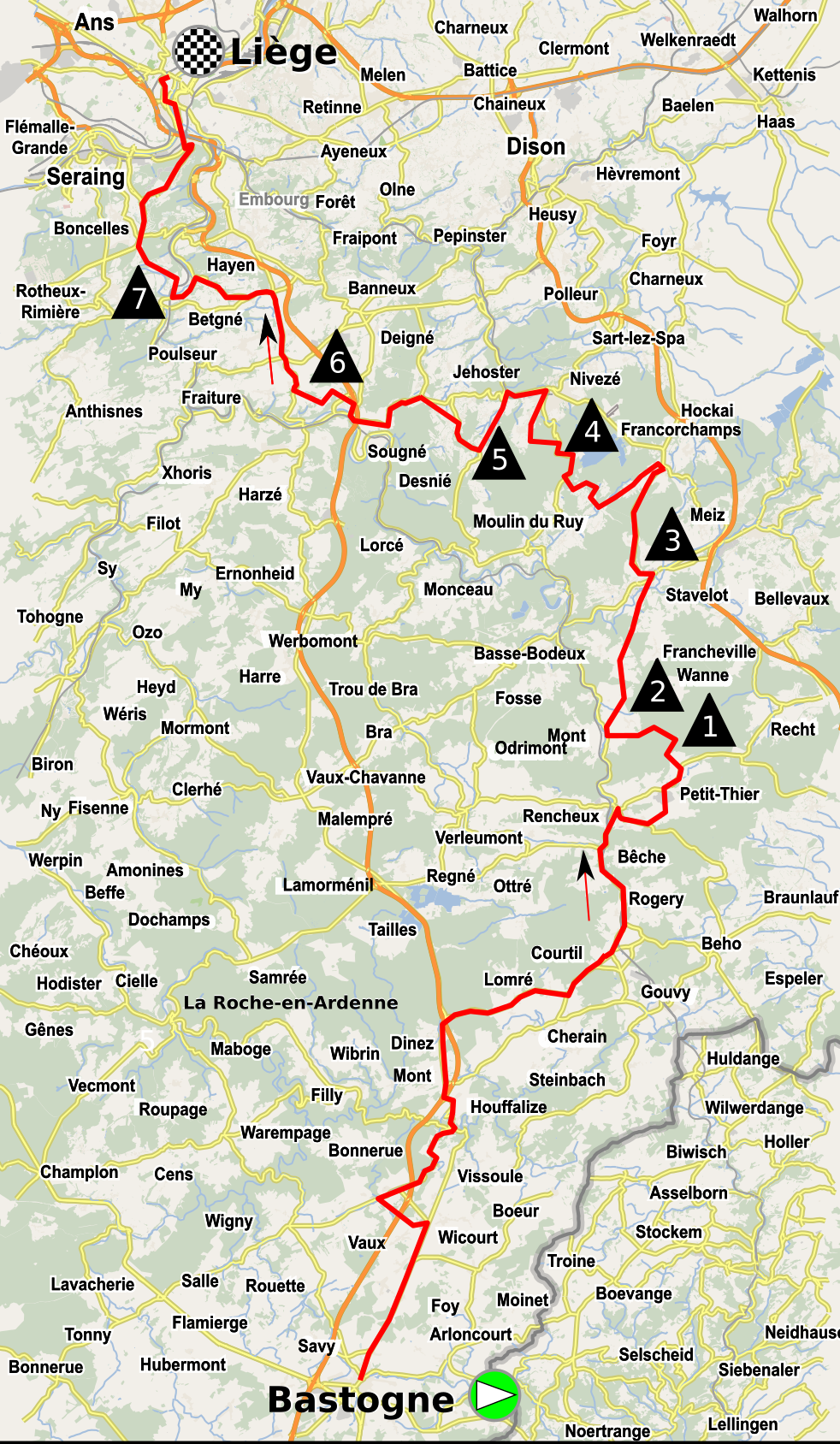
Route map

With a route similar to the previous editions of the race, the race started in Bastogne and finished in Liège. At 142.5 km (88.5 mi), the race was approximately half the distance of the men's event. It started in Bastogne, from where it headed north to finish in Liège on the same location as the men's race.

The route featured seven categorised climbs: the Côte de Mont-Le-Soie, Côte de Wanne, Côte de la Haute-Levée, Col de Rosier, Côte de Desnié, Côte de La Redoute and Côte de la Roche aux Faucons. The key difference to the route was the omission of Côte des Forges from the route following severe flooding in July 2021.

== Summary ==
With around 30 km to go, Annemiek van Vleuten of Movistar Team attacked on Côte de La Redoute, bridging the gap to a breakaway. A group of sixteen riders chased down van Vleuten, coming back together with around 20 km to go. Approaching the final climb of Côte de la Roche-aux-Faucons, Grace Brown of FDJ Nouvelle-Aquitaine Futuroscope counterattacked and opened a small gap to the leading group - however van Vleuten attacked again, this time going solo and extending her lead over the final 10 kilometres. She crossed the finish line in Liège 43 seconds ahead of Grace Brown, who won the sprint for second place ahead of Demi Vollering of SD Worx.

== Results ==
Result
Rank	Rider	Team	Time
1	Annemiek van Vleuten (NED)	Movistar Team	3h 52' 32"
2	Grace Brown (AUS)	FDJ Nouvelle-Aquitaine Futuroscope	+ 43"
3	Demi Vollering (NED)	SD Worx	+ 43"
4	Ashleigh Moolman-Pasio (RSA)	SD Worx	+ 43"
5	Elisa Longo Borghini (ITA)	Trek–Segafredo	+ 43"
6	Marta Cavalli (ITA)	FDJ Nouvelle-Aquitaine Futuroscope	+ 47'
7	Arlenis Sierra Canadilla (CUB)	Movistar Team	+ 1' 58"
8	Liane Lippert (GER)	Team DSM	+ 1' 58"
9	Katarzyna Niewiadoma (POL)	Canyon//SRAM	+ 1' 58"
10	Amanda Spratt (AUS)	Team BikeExchange–Jayco	+ 1' 58"
