= Demi Vollering =

Dutch cyclist (born 1996)

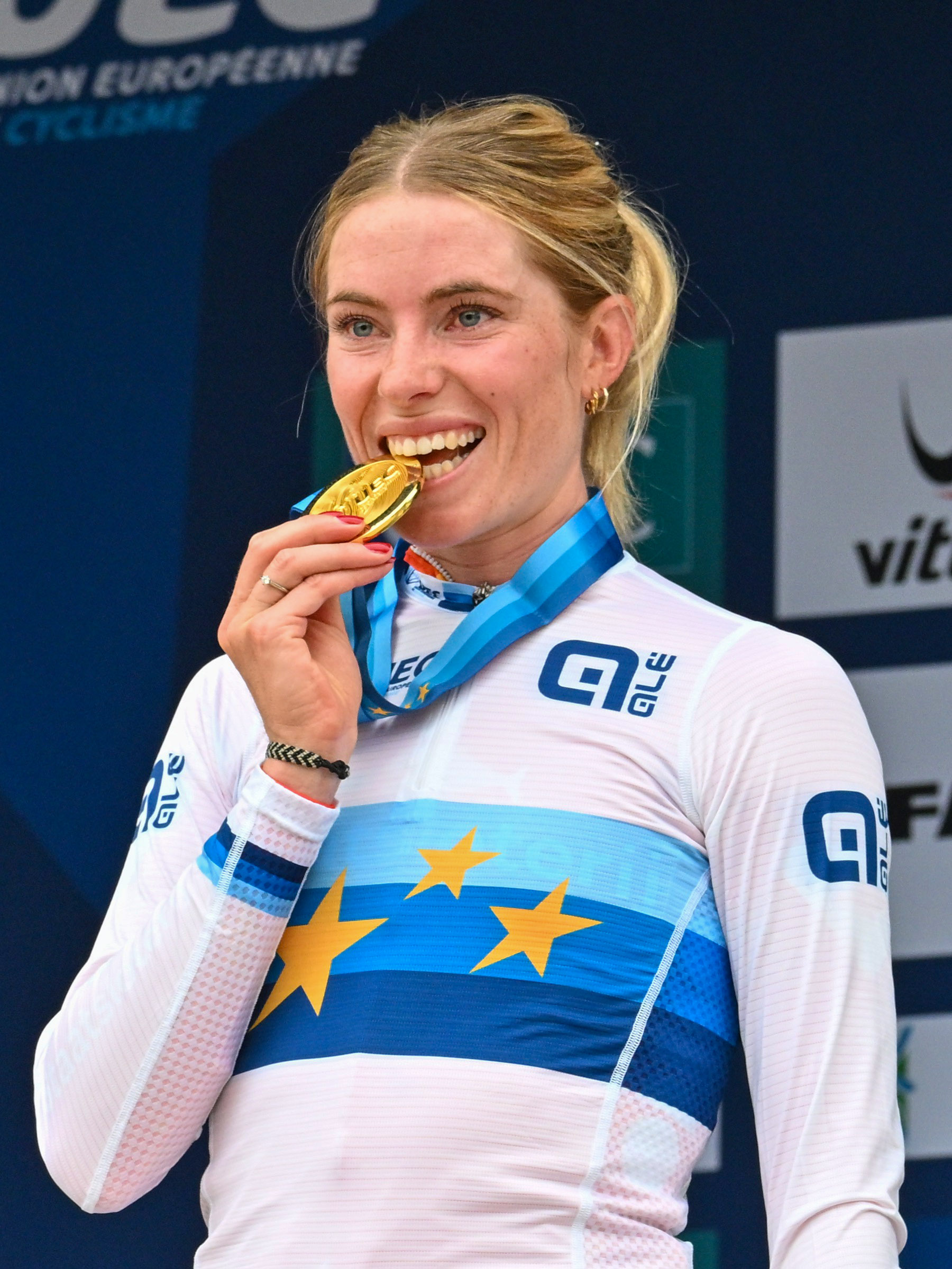
- Vollering in 2025

Personal information
- Full name: Adriana Geertruida Vollering
- Born: 15 November 1996 (age 30)
- Height: 172 cm (5 ft 8 in)
- Weight: 57 kg (126 lb)

Cycling career
- Sport: Cycling
- Current team: FDJ United–Suez
- Discipline: Road
- Role: Rider

Professional teams
- 2019–2020: Parkhotel Valkenburg
- 2021–2024: SD Worx
- 2025–2028: FDJ–Suez

Major wins
- Major Tours Tour de France General classification (2023, 2026) Mountains classification (2022) 6 individual stages (2023, 2024, 2026) Giro d'Italia Women General classification (2026) Mountains classification (2026) 2 individual stages (2026) La Vuelta Femenina General classification (2024, 2025) Mountains classification (2024, 2025) 6 individual stages (2023, 2024, 2025) Stage races Itzulia Women (2022, 2024, 2025) Vuelta a Burgos (2023, 2024) Volta a Catalunya (2025) Tour of Britain (2021) Tour de Romandie (2023) Tour de Suisse (2024) One-day races and Classics World Road Race Championships (2026) European Road Race Championships (2025, 2026) National Road Race Championships (2023) Liège–Bastogne–Liège (2021, 2023, 2026) Tour of Flanders (2026) Omloop Het Nieuwsblad (2026) Strade Bianche (2023, 2025) Dwars door Vlaanderen (2023) Brabantse Pijl (2022) Amstel Gold Race (2023) La Flèche Wallonne (2023, 2026) La Course by Le Tour de France (2021) Other Vélo d'Or (2023)
Medal record
Road cycling
Representing Netherlands
World Championships
Gold medal – first place	2026 Montreal	Road race
Silver medal – second place	2023 Glasgow	Road race
Silver medal – second place	2024 Zurich	Time trial
Bronze medal – third place	2025 Kigali	Time trial
European Championships
Gold medal – first place	2025 Guilherand-Granges	Road race
Gold medal – first place	2026 Ljubljana	Road race
Silver medal – second place	2026 Ljubljana	Time trial
Bronze medal – third place	2021 Trentino	Mixed team relay
Women's gravel cycling
World Championships
Bronze medal – third place	2023 Veneto	Elite

Adriana Geertruida "Demi" Vollering (Dutch: [ˈdeːmi ˈvɔlərɪŋ]; born 15 November 1996) is a Dutch professional racing cyclist who rides for UCI Women's WorldTeam FDJ United–Suez. Considered one of the greatest riders of her generation, she has achieved major successes in both one-day classics and stage races and is the current road race world champion.

Among the monuments, she won the 2026 Tour of Flanders and three editions of Liège–Bastogne–Liège, in 2021, 2023, and 2026. This included an "Ardennes triple" in 2023, when she won the Amstel Gold Race, La Flèche Wallonne and Liège–Bastogne–Liège in the same season, becoming the second woman to achieve this feat. She has won the three Grand Tours: the Tour de France in 2023 and 2026, the Vuelta in 2024 and 2025, and the Giro in 2026.

In 2023 and 2025, she topped the year-end UCI world rankings, winning the Vélo d'Or in 2023. In 2026, she became the first rider to win the Tour de France Femmes twice. In the 2026 UCI Road World Championships she won the elite women road race.

== Early life ==
Adriana Geertruida Vollering, known by the nickname "Demi", was born on 15 November 1996 and grew up in Pijnacker, Netherlands. She is the oldest of four siblings, including fellow cyclist Bodine Vollering, who made her professional debut with VolkerWessels Cycling Team in 2025.

Following in the footsteps of her flower-growing family, Vollering initially worked as a florist and earned a qualification in floral design.

Until 2019, Vollering also trained in speed skating, competing at national level in the Netherlands. As a youngster, speed skating was her primary sport, and it was only in 2017, after a cycling holiday to the Ardennes that her partner convinced her to focus on the sport full-time.

== Professional career ==
=== 2019–2020: breakthrough ===
==== 2019 ====
Having raced in 2018 as an amateur with the domestic SwaboLadies.nl team, Vollering signed her first professional contract in 2019 with Dutch team Parkhotel Valkenburg.

Her first spring campaign as a professional cyclist was a successful one, with top-10 finishes at the Amstel Gold Race, La Flèche Wallonne, and a first Monument podium at Liège–Bastogne–Liège.

In May 2019, Vollering achieved her first professional victory: a 2.7 km prologue at the Festival Elsy Jacobs in Luxembourg, taking the leader's jersey in the process. She followed this up in October with a second professional win at the Giro dell'Emilia, beating Elisa Longo Borghini in a two-rider sprint at the top of the Madonna di San Luca climb.

==== 2020 ====
In the COVID-19-affected 2020 season, Vollering continued to impress in WorldTour races, coming third at both La Course by Le Tour de France and La Flèche Wallonne, in addition to top-10 results on the cobbles at Gent–Wevelgem and the Tour of Flanders.

Following two successful seasons with Parkhotel Valkenburg, joined UCI WorldTeam SD Worx from the 2021 season onwards.

=== 2021–2024: SD Worx, Tour de France Femmes and stage race dominance ===
==== 2021 ====
Vollering started the season strongly with top-10 finishes at Strade Bianche and the Tour of Flanders. She then finished as runner-up at De Brabantse Pijl, celebrating as she crossed the line only to find out she had been pipped by Ruth Winder's late bike throw.

In the Ardennes classics, Vollering started the week with an impressive second place to Marianne Vos at the Amstel Gold Race, followed by a tenth-place finish at La Flèche Wallonne. Vollering then took her first career monument victory at Liège–Bastogne–Liège, winning the sprint from a five-rider group containing Annemiek van Vleuten, Elisa Longo Borghini, Kasia Niewiadoma and teammate Anna van der Breggen.

At what was to be the final edition of La Course by Le Tour de France, Vollering took her second WorldTour victory of the season, winning the sprint in Landerneau from an eight-rider group.

In July, Vollering took her first podium in a major tour at the Giro in Italy, finishing in third place behind her teammates Anna van der Breggen and Ashleigh Moolman-Pasio. This included second-place finishes on the stage 4 time trial to Cascata del Toce and the stage 9 summit finish up Monte Matajur.

Vollering competed in the road race at the delayed 2020 Summer Olympics in Tokyo, placing 25th. She also achieved top-10 finishes in the UEC European Championships and UCI World Championships road races.

In October, Vollering won her first career stage race at The Women's Tour. After helping teammate Amy Pieters win on stage 1, Vollering took the leader's jersey by winning the stage 3 by winning 16.6 km stage 3 time trial in Atherstone, putting more than a minute into her competitors in the process.

==== 2022 ====
Vollering had a strong spring classics campaign, winning De Brabantse Pijl, coming second at Omloop het Nieuwsblad and the Amstel Gold Race, and taking the third spot on the podium at La Flèche Wallonne and Liège–Bastogne–Liège.

In the inaugural edition of Itzulia Women, Vollering won all three stages and the general classification. The following week at the Vuelta a Burgos, Vollering took victory in the final stage to Lagunas de Neila, finishing third overall behind Juliette Labous and Évita Muzic.

Vollering's impressive results meant she went into the first edition of the rebooted women's Tour de France as one of the two big favourites alongside Annemiek van Vleuten. She finished the race as the runner-up to Van Vleuten after consecutive second-place finishes on stages 7 and 8 in the Vosges mountains. In the process, she won the iconic polka dot jersey as the leading rider in the mountains classification.

In September, Vollering added her fourth stage-race podium of the season, finishing in third place overall at the Challenge by La Vuelta.

==== 2023 ====
The 2023 season saw Vollering complete her rise to superstardom with one of the most dominant years in cycling history.

In March, Vollering won her first Strade Bianche on the white gravel roads of Tuscany in a photo finish ahead of teammate Lotte Kopecky. The race was noted for a dramatic incident with 16 kilometres to go, when a horse ran onto the course in front of Vollering, briefly holding her up on the narrow stretch of road.

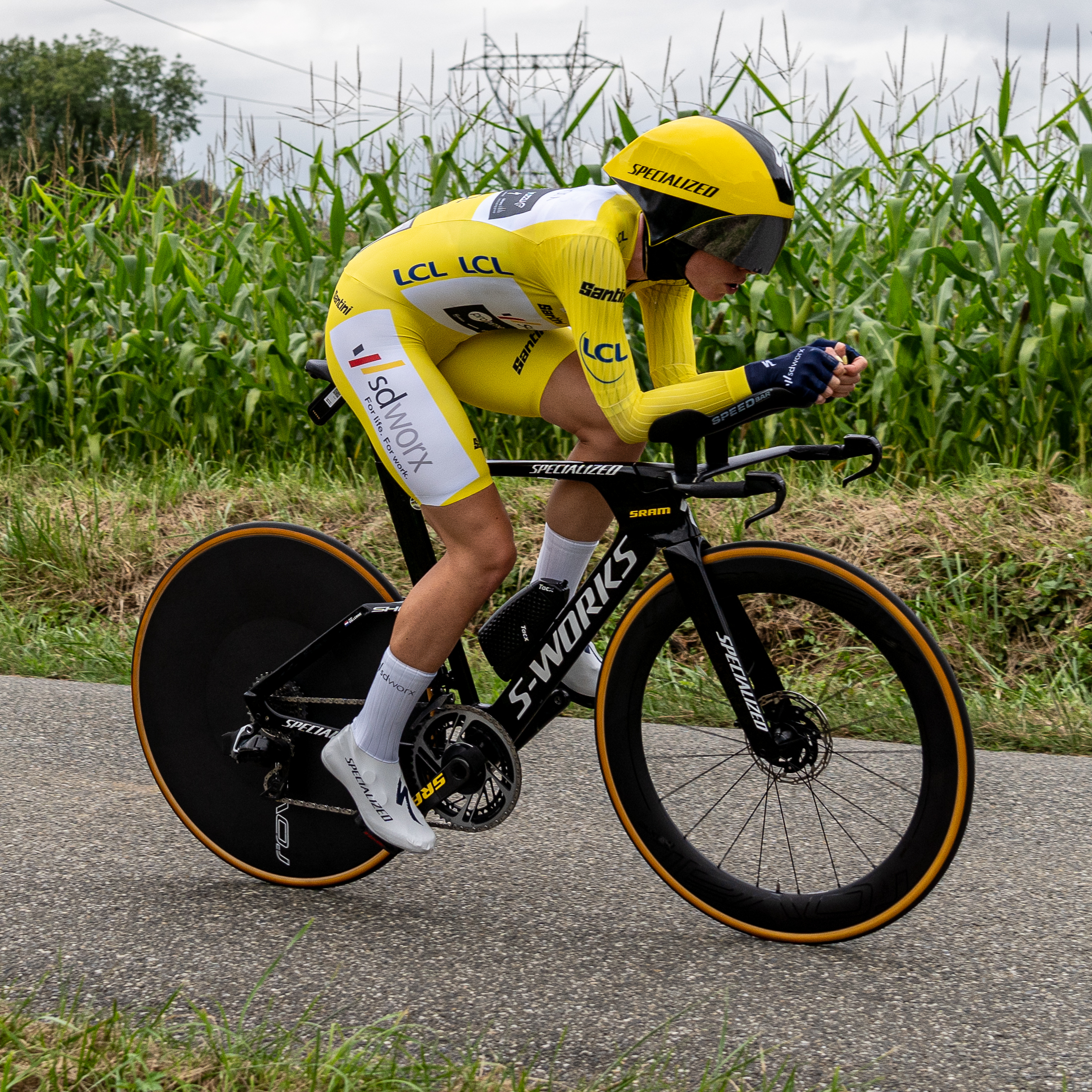
Vollering wearing the yellow jersey at the 2023 Tour de France Femmes

Vollering added a second victory of the season in her next race at Dwars door Vlaanderen, before finishing as runner-up to her teammate Kopecky in the first Monument of the season at the Tour of Flanders. Another second place followed at De Brabantse Pijl, as Vollering was beaten in a sprint in Overijse by Silvia Persico.

The following week, Vollering became just the fourth rider in history (after men Davide Rebellin and Philippe Gilbert, and former teammate Anna van der Breggen) to win the "Ardennes triple" of the Amstel Gold Race, La Flèche Wallonne and Liège–Bastogne–Liège in the same season. At the Amstel Gold Race, Vollering cemented another SD Worx one-two ahead of Lotte Kopecky, soloing to victory in the final kilometres after a late attack over the top of the Cauberg. A few days later at La Flèche Wallonne, Vollering attacked from a reduced group at the bottom of the Mur de Huy to take a dominant victory. Vollering completed the Ardennes triple in Liège by outsprinting Elisa Longo Borghini in a two-up finish.

Vollering's electric form did not slow as racing moved to Spain after the early-season classics. At La Vuelta, she took the leader's red jersey after winning stage 5 to the Mirador de Peñas Llanas in Riaza. She would then lose the jersey on stage 6 in a controversial incident. Having stopped for a nature break and not yet returned to the peloton, Movistar and their leader Annemiek van Vleuten upped the pace in a section of crosswinds, splitting the peloton and leaving Vollering and her SD Worx teammates chasing for the following 70 kilometres to the finish. She was able to limit her losses on the stage to one minute and four seconds but this meant losing the general classification lead to Van Vleuten heading into the final stage. On stage 7, Vollering distanced Van Vleuten on the final climb to Lagos de Covadonga, winning the stage and securing ten bonus seconds. However, she was unable to overhaul the entirety of her deficit, ultimately finishing the race in second place, just nine seconds behind the winner Van Vleuten.

In the following Spanish races, Vollering won the first two stages of Itzulia Women (making her the winner of the first five stages in the race's history), before taking second place on the final stage and finishing as runner-up to teammate Marlen Reusser in the general classification. She then went one better at the Vuelta a Burgos, winning another two stages on her way to the overall race victory.

In June, Vollering finished second to teammate Reusser in the general classification at the Tour de Suisse. She then claimed her first career Dutch National Road Race Championship, launching an attack on the final lap of a hilly route around Sittard.

At the Tour de France Femmes avec Zwift, it was once again Vollering and Van Vleuten who were expected to battle it out for the yellow jersey in a renewal of their blossoming rivalry. Going into the final two stages, it was Vollering's SD Worx teammate Lotte Kopecky who held the race lead, with a 55-second lead over Van Vleuten and fellow contender Kasia Niewiadoma, with Vollering a further 12 seconds in arrears. Stage 7 was a Pyrenean epic, and atop the Col d'Aspin with 30 kilometres remaining, only Vollering, Van Vleuten and Niewiadoma remained at the head of the race. Vollering and Van Vleuten marked each other profusely, allowing Niewiadoma to steal a march into the final climb up the Col du Tourmalet. Yet it was Vollering who dealt the killer blow, launching an attack with 5.5 km to go, and arriving at the top through the mist with an almost two-minute gap over second-placed Niewiadoma. Wearing the yellow jersey on stage 8 in Pau, Vollering rode a strong time trial to finish in second place on the stage and secure her first major tour general classification victory.

Following her Tour de France win, Vollering claimed the silver medal behind Lotte Kopecky at the UCI World Championships road race in Glasgow and later the bronze medal at the UCI Gravel World Championships in Veneto. She also won a stage and the overall classification at the Tour de Romandie.

Vollering's dominant season saw her top the year-end UCI world rankings and she was awarded the prestigious Vélo d'Or.

==== 2024 ====
Following on from her annus mirabilis in 2023, Vollering went through the entire spring classics campaign without raising her arms in victory. She began her season at Omloop het Nieuwsblad with a sixth-place finish, followed third place at Strade Bianche and eighth place at the Tour of Flanders, before rounding out the spring classics with back-to-back podium finishes as runner-up at La Flèche Wallonne and third place at Liège–Bastogne–Liège.

Vollering quickly cleared up any doubts about her form, by dominating the Spanish stage racing block. She took her first win of the season at La Vuelta on the stage 5 summit finish in Jaca, moving into the race leader's red jersey. She finished as runner up to Évita Muzic on the following stage to Laguna Negra, before taking another stage victory and securing the general classification on stage 8 to Valdesquí. She followed this win up by winning a stage and the overall title at Itzulia Women, as well as two stages and the general classification at the Vuelta a Burgos.

In June, Vollering continued her stage race dominance by winning three out of four stages and the general classification at the Tour de Suisse.

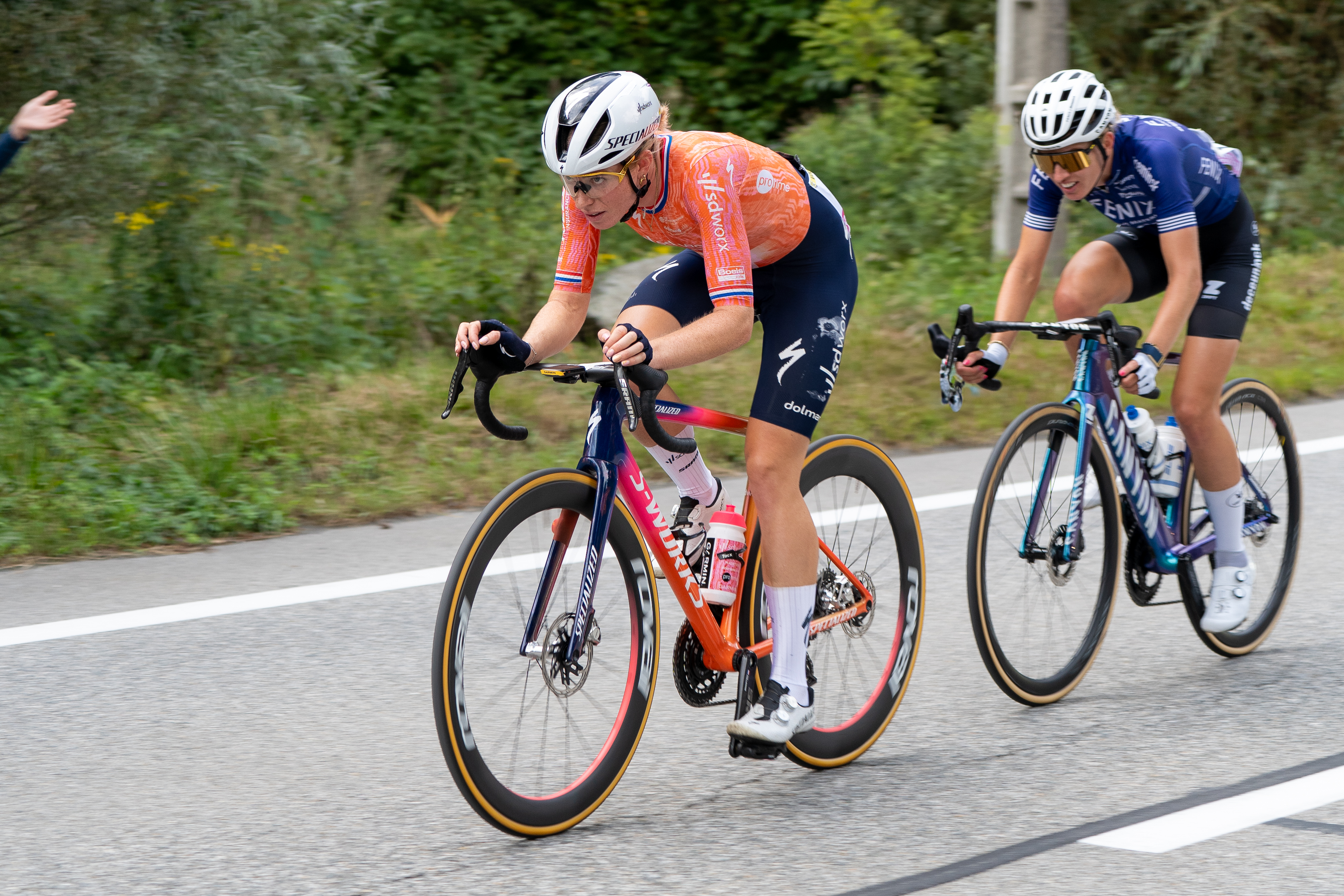
Demi Vollering in stage 8 of the 2024 Tour de France Femmes

Vollering was considered the red-hot favourite heading into the Tour de France in August. She took a surprise win in the flat 6.3 km individual time trial in Rotterdam on stage 3 to move into the yellow jersey before the race had even reached French soil. The next day, she finished second to Puck Pieterse in a hilly stage that featured the same finale as Liège–Bastogne–Liège. Vollering saw her luck change when the race entered France on stage 5. She came down in a mass crash with just 6 kilometres to go, causing her to lose one minute and 47 seconds in the general classification. Vollering slipped to ninth overall, one minute and 19 seconds behind the new yellow jersey wearer Kasia Niewiadoma. Despite her injuries, Vollering remained in the race, entering the mountainous final stage with a deficit of one minute and 15 seconds to Niewiadoma. On the Col du Glandon, the first of two hors catégorie climbs, Vollering attacked from the peloton with Pauliena Rooijakkers, distancing Niewadoma. Although Rooijakkers herself had moved into the virtual lead of the race, she refused to work with Vollering in the valley as the chasing group ate into the gap and they came to the foot of the final climb up Alpe d'Huez just 43 seconds ahead over Niewidoma. With Vollering in visible discomfort from the injuries she had suffered a few days prior, she was nonetheless able to increase the gap to Niewiadoma. After closing down an attack by Rooijakkers with 2.5 km to go, Vollering won the sprint for the stage win, taking ten bonus seconds to Rooijakkers' six, thus moving ahead of her in the general classification. However, it proved not enough, as Niewiadoma crossed the stage finish line one minute and one second back. Vollering finished the race in second place, a mere four seconds behind the winner.

Upon returning to her home in Switzerland after the Tour de France, medical tests revealed that Vollering had in fact been riding with a fractured coccyx from the crash on stage 5.

At the Tour de Romandie in September, in what was to be her final race for SD Worx, Vollering won the stage 2 summit finish at Vercorin and finished second overall behind her teammate Lotte Kopecky.

Vollering closed out her season at the UCI Road World Championships in Zürich. She won the silver medal in the individual time trial, 16 seconds behind Grace Brown, and finished fifth in the road race.

=== 2025–present: move to FDJ–Suez, Grand Tour wins and World Champion ===
==== 2025 ====
After four seasons with SD Worx, Vollering signed a two-year contract with French team FDJ–Suez, bringing Specialized and Nike with her as new sponsors. Vollering got off to an excellent start with her new team, winning stage 1 and the general classification of the Setmana Ciclista Valenciana in February. In the spring classics, Vollering finished third at Omloop Nieuwsblad before winning Strade Bianche for the second time in her career. Vollering also finished fourth in Milano–Sanremo, second in La Flèche Wallonne and third at Liège–Bastogne–Liège.

In the big stage races, Vollering won La Vuelta Femenina for the second time, winning two stages and finishing more than a minute ahead of Marlen Reusser. At the Tour de France Femmes, Vollering finished second overall behind Pauline Ferrand-Prévot, over three and a half minutes behind. Vollering expressed her disappointment in the result, stating "I came here for stage wins and the yellow jersey but didn't get either".

At the UCI Road World Championships in Rwanda, she won the bronze medal in the individual time trial, 1 minute and 4 seconds behind winner Reusser, and finished seventh in the road race.

==== 2026 ====
Vollering had a strong spring classics season, winning Omloop Het Nieuwsblad, the Tour of Flanders, La Flèche Wallonne Femmes and Liège–Bastogne–Liège Femmes.

In May 2026, Vollering extended her contract with FDJ United–Suez until 2028. Vollering skipped La Vuelta Femenina, entering the repositioned Giro d'Italia Women instead. During the Giro, Vollering overcame a deficit of a little less than one minute to Anna van der Breggen, taking the overall lead on the final stage to becoming the second woman to have won all three Grand Tours after Annemiek van Vleuten. She won the 2026 Tour de France Femmes, becoming the first person to win it twice. Vollering took an eight-second lead in the penultimate stage of the race and won by over a minute.

On 26 September 2026, Vollering became world champion in the road race at the 2026 UCI Road World Championships, held in Montreal, Canada, ahead of Katarzyna Niewiadoma-Phinney. She was later fined and docked 25 points, in the UCI rankings, due to using a non-compliant position during the race, but retained the rainbow jersey. Vollering then went onto retain her European Championship title.

== Major results ==
=== Road ===
2018
9th Overall Tour of Uppsala
2019
1st Giro dell'Emilia
1st Volta Limburg Classic
2nd Overall Grand Prix Elsy Jacobs

1st Prologue

3rd Liège–Bastogne–Liège
5th La Flèche Wallonne
5th Overall The Women's Tour
5th GP de Plouay
7th Amstel Gold Race
2020
3rd Overall Setmana Ciclista Valenciana
3rd La Course by Le Tour de France
3rd La Flèche Wallonne
7th Gent–Wevelgem
7th Tour of Flanders
2021
1st Overall The Women's Tour

1st Stage 3 (ITT)

1st La Course by Le Tour de France
1st Liège–Bastogne–Liège
2nd Amstel Gold Race
2nd Brabantse Pijl
2nd Emakumeen Nafarroako Klasikoa
UEC European Championships

3rd Team relay
5th Road race

3rd Overall Giro Rosa
3rd Overall Vuelta a Burgos
5th Tour of Flanders
5th Overall Holland Ladies Tour
5th Clasica Navarra
6th Strade Bianche
7th Road race, UCI World Championships
10th La Flèche Wallonne
2022
1st Overall Itzulia Women

1st Points classification
1st Stages 1, 2 & 3

1st Brabantse Pijl
2nd Overall Tour de France

1st Mountains classification

2nd Omloop Het Nieuwsblad
2nd Amstel Gold Race
3rd Overall Vuelta a Burgos

1st Mountains classification
1st Stage 4

3rd La Flèche Wallonne
3rd Liège–Bastogne–Liège
4th Overall Grand Prix Elsy Jacobs
7th Road race, UCI World Championships
10th La Flèche Wallonne
2023
1st Overall UCI World Tour
1st Road race, National Championships
1st Overall Tour de France

1st Stage 7

1st Overall Vuelta a Burgos

1st Mountains classification
1st Stage 2 & 4

1st Overall Tour de Romandie

1st Stage 2

1st Liège–Bastogne–Liège
1st Amstel Gold Race
1st La Flèche Wallonne
1st Strade Bianche
1st Dwars door Vlaanderen
2nd Road race, UCI World Championships
2nd Tour of Flanders
2nd Brabantse Pijl
2nd Overall La Vuelta Femenina

1st Stages 5 & 7
Held after Stage 5

2nd Overall Itzulia Women

1st Mountains classification
1st Stages 1 & 2

6th UCI Road World Championships – Women's time trial
10th Road race, UEC European Championships
2024
1st Overall La Vuelta Femenina

1st Mountains classification
1st Stages 5 & 8

1st Overall Itzulia Women

1st Points classification
1st Stage 3

1st Overall Vuelta a Burgos

1st Mountains classification
1st Points classification
1st Stages 2 & 4

1st Overall Tour de Suisse

1st Points classification
1st Stages 1, 2 & 4

2nd Overall Tour de France

1st Stages 3 (ITT) & 8
Held after Stages 3–4
Combativity award Stage 8 & Overall

2nd UCI Road World Championships – Women's time trial
2nd Brabantse Pijl
2nd La Flèche Wallonne
3rd Strade Bianche
3rd Liège–Bastogne–Liège
5th UCI Road World Championships – Women's road race
5th Time trial, Olympic Games
6th Omloop Het Nieuwsblad
2025
1st Road race, UEC European Championships
1st Overall La Vuelta Femenina

1st Mountains classification
1st Stages 5 & 7

1st Overall Volta a Catalunya

1st Points classification
1st Mountains classification
1st Stage 2

1st Overall Itzulia Women

1st Mountains classification
1st Stage 3

1st Overall Setmana Ciclista Valenciana

1st Stage 1

1st Strade Bianche
2nd Overall Tour de France
2nd La Flèche Wallonne
2nd Tre Valli Varesine
3rd UCI Road World Championships – Women's time trial
3rd Liège–Bastogne–Liège
3rd Omloop Het Nieuwsblad
4th Milan–San Remo
7th UCI Road World Championships – Women's road race
2026
1st UCI Road World Championships – Women's road race
UEC European Championships

1st Road race
2nd Time trial

1st Overall Tour de France

1st Stages 5, 8 & 9
Combativity award Stage 5

1st Overall Giro d'Italia

1st Mountains classification
1st Stages 5 & 8

1st Overall Setmana Ciclista Valenciana

1st Stages 1 & 4

1st Tour of Flanders
1st Liège–Bastogne–Liège
1st La Flèche Wallonne
1st Omloop Het Nieuwsblad
2nd Dwars door Vlaanderen
8th UCI Road World Championships – Women's time trial

==== General classification results timeline ====
Major Tour results timeline
Stage race	2019	2020	2021	2022	2023	2024	2025	2026
La Vuelta Femenina (Note: Known as Madrid Challenge by La Vuelta in 2019 (2 stages) and as Challenge by La Vuelta from 2020 to 2022 (3, 4, and 5 stages).)	—	—	—	3	2	1	1	—
Giro d'Italia Women	13	—	3	—	—	—	—	1
Tour de France Femmes	Race did not exist			2	1	2	2	1
Stage race results timeline
Stage race	2019	2020	2021	2022	2023	2024	2025	2026
Grand Prix Elsy Jacobs	2	NH	—	4	—	—	—	—
The Women's Tour	5	NH	1	—	NH	—	—	
Vuelta a Burgos	—	NH	3	3	1	1	—	—
Simac Ladies Tour (Note: Known as the Boels Ladies Tour until 2020)	—	NH	5	—	DNF	—	—	
Itzulia Women	Race did not exist			1	2	1	1	
Tour of Scandinavia (Note: Known as the Ladies Tour of Norway until 2021)	60	—	—	DNF	—	NH	—	—
Tour de Romandie Féminin	Race did not exist			16	1	2	—	NH
Tour de Suisse	Race not held		—	—	2	1	2	—

==== Classics results timeline ====
Monument	2019	2020	2021	2022	2023	2024	2025	2026
Milan–San Remo	Not held						4	—
Tour of Flanders	—	7	5	17	2	8	—	1
Paris–Roubaix	DNE	NH	—	—	—	—	—	—
Liège–Bastogne–Liège	3	11	1	3	1	3	3	1
Classic	2019	2020	2021	2022	2023	2024	2025	2026
Omloop Het Nieuwsblad	—	—	13	2	17	6	3	1
Strade Bianche	—	20	6	12	1	3	1	20
Ronde van Drenthe	—	NH	—	—	—	—	NH	—
Trofeo Alfredo Binda	17	NH	—	—	—	—	11	—
Gent–Wevelgem	35	—	—	—	—	—	—	—
Dwars door Vlaanderen	—	—	—	—	1	96	—	2
Brabantse Pijl	—	—	2	1	2	2	—	—
Amstel Gold Race	7	NH	2	2	1	22	20	3
La Flèche Wallonne	5	3	10	3	1	2	2	1

==== Major championships results timeline ====
Event		2017	2018	2019	2020	2021	2022	2023	2024	2025	2026
Olympic Games	Time trial	Not held				—	Not held		5	Not held	
Olympic Games	Road race	Not held				25	Not held		34	Not held	
World Championships	Time trial	—	—	—	—	—	—	6	2	3	8
World Championships	Road race	—	—	56	35	7	DNS	2	5	7	1
European Championships	Time trial	—	—	—	—	—	—	—	—	—	2
European Championships	Road race	—	—	33	10	5	—	10	—	1	1
National Championships	Time trial	—	21	22	NH	6	—	2	3	—	—
National Championships	Road race	49	22	53	10	9	20	1	24	72	—

Legend
—	Did not compete
DNF	Did not finish
NH	Not held
DNE	Did not exist

=== Gravel ===
2023
3rd UCI World Championships
