= 2024 Liège–Bastogne–Liège Femmes =

Cycling race

2024 UCI Women's World Tour, race 14 of 27

Race details
- Dates: 21 April 2024
- Distance: 152.9 km (95.0 mi)
- Winning time: 4h 29' 00"

Results
	Winner	Grace Brown (AUS)	(FDJ–Suez)
	Second	Elisa Longo Borghini (ITA)	(Lidl–Trek)
	Third	Demi Vollering (NED)	(Team SD Worx–Protime)

The 2024 Liège–Bastogne–Liège Femmes was a Belgian road cycling one-day race that took place on 21 April. It was the 8th edition of Liège–Bastogne–Liège Femmes and the 14th event of the 2024 UCI Women's World Tour. The race was won by Australian rider Grace Brown of FDJ–Suez in a sprint finish of 6 breakaway riders.

== Teams ==
Twenty-four teams took part in the race.

UCI Women's WorldTeams

- AG Insurance–Soudal
- Canyon//SRAM
- Ceratizit–WNT Pro Cycling
- FDJ–Suez
- Fenix–Deceuninck
- Human Powered Health
- Lidl–Trek
- Liv AlUla Jayco
- Movistar Team
- Roland
- Team dsm–firmenich PostNL
- Team SD Worx–Protime
- UAE Team ADQ
- Uno-X Mobility
- Visma–Lease a Bike

UCI Women's Continental Teams

- Arkéa–B&B Hotels Women
- Cofidis
- EF Education–Cannondale
- Laboral Kutxa–Fundación Euskadi
- Lifeplus Wahoo
- Lotto–Dstny Ladies
- St. Michel–Mavic–Auber93
- Team Coop–Repsol
- VolkerWessels Women Cyclingteam

== Route ==
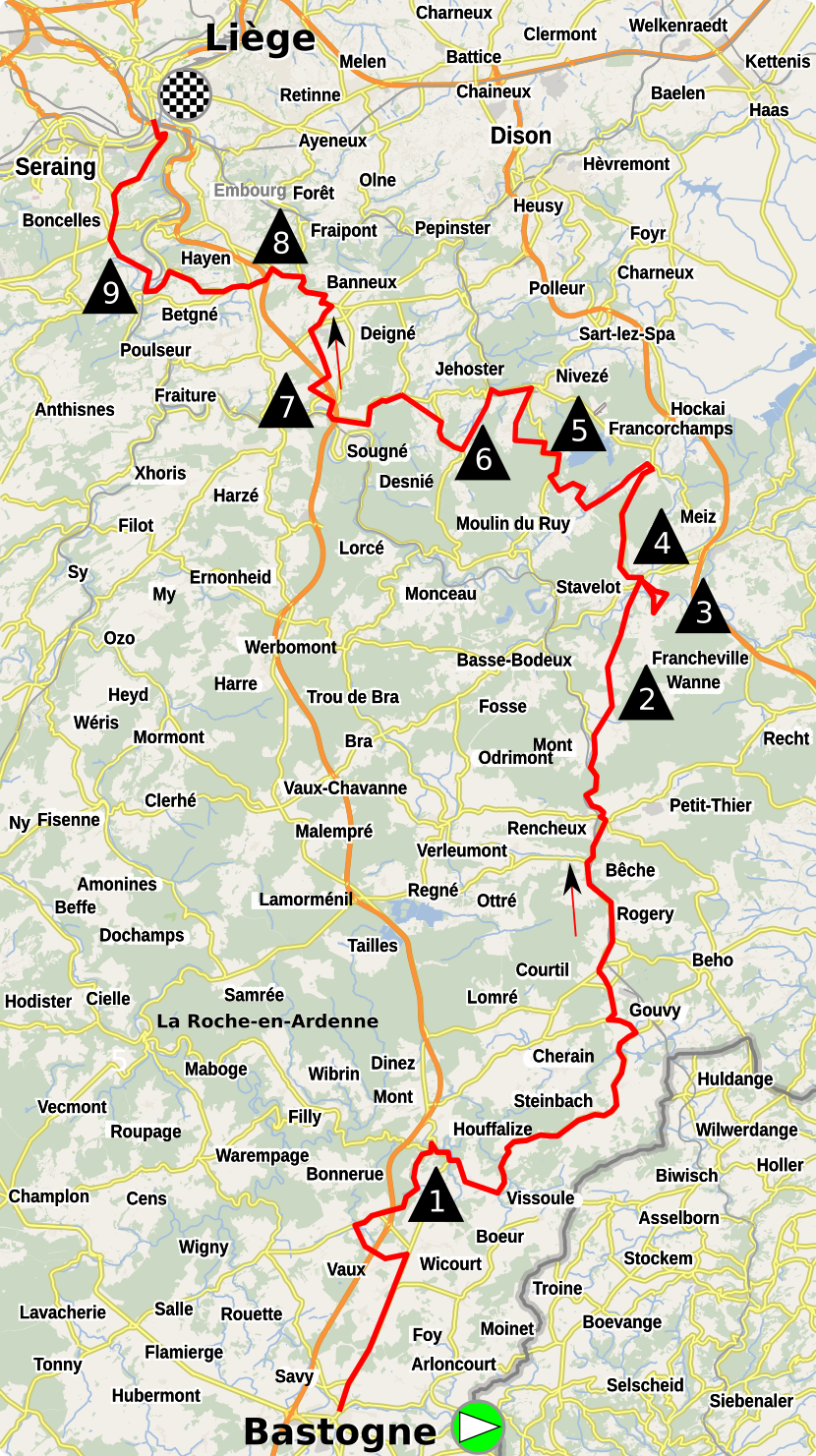
Course map

With a route similar to the previous editions of the race, the race started in Bastogne and finished in Liège, at the same location as the men's race. At 152.9 km (95.0 mi), the race was approximately half the distance of the men's event.

The route featured ten categorised climbs: the Côte de Saint-Roch, Côte de Mont-le-Soie, Côte de Wanne, Côte de Stockeu, Côte de Haute-Levée, Col du Rosier, Côte de Desnié, Côte de La Redoute, Côte des Forges and Côte de la Roche aux Faucons.

== Result ==
Result
Rank	Rider	Team	Time
1	Grace Brown (AUS)	FDJ–Suez	4h 29' 00"
2	Elisa Longo Borghini (ITA)	Lidl–Trek	+ 0"
3	Demi Vollering (NED)	Team SD Worx–Protime	+ 0"
4	Elise Chabbey (SUI)	Canyon//SRAM	+ 0"
5	Katarzyna Niewiadoma (POL)	Canyon//SRAM	+ 0"
6	Kim Cadzow (NZL)	EF Education–Cannondale	+ 0'
7	Marianne Vos (NED)	Visma–Lease a Bike	+ 52"
8	Juliette Labous (FRA)	Team dsm–firmenich PostNL	+ 52"
9	Ricarda Bauernfeind (GER)	Canyon//SRAM	+ 52"
10	Niamh Fisher-Black (NZL)	Team SD Worx–Protime	+ 52"
