= 2023 Vuelta a Burgos Feminas =

2023 UCI Women's World Tour, race 17 of 27

Race details
- Dates: 18–21 May 2023
- Stages: 4
- Distance: 468.7 km (291.2 mi)
- Winning time: 11h 46' 12"

Results
Jersey awarded to the overall winner	Winner	Demi Vollering (NED)	(SD Worx)
	Second	Shirin van Anrooij (NED)	(Trek–Segafredo)
	Third	Ashleigh Moolman Pasio (RSA)	(AG Insurance–Soudal–Quick-Step)
Jersey awarded to the points classification winner	Points	Lorena Wiebes (NED)	(SD Worx)
Jersey awarded to the mountains classification winner	Mountains	Demi Vollering (NED)	(SD Worx)
Jersey awarded to the young rider classification winner	Young rider	Shirin van Anrooij (NED)	(Trek–Segafredo)
	Team	Canyon//SRAM	

The 2023 Vuelta a Burgos Feminas was a Spanish women's cycle stage race that was held in the Province of Burgos in northern Spain from 18 to 21 May 2023. It was the eighth running of Vuelta a Burgos Feminas, being held as part of the 2023 UCI Women's World Tour.

The race was won by Dutch rider Demi Vollering of SD Worx, in her fifth win of the season. The SD Worx team dominated the event, winning 3 of the 5 classifications.

== Route ==
The route used flat and hilly stages in the province of Burgos. The final stage had a mountain top finish at Lagunas de Neila, a 12 kilometre climb with an average gradient of 6.3% and steep sections over 11%.

Stage characteristics and winners
Stage	Date	Route	Distance	Type	Winner	Team
1	18 May	Quintanaortuño to Medina de Pomar	115.6 km (71.8 mi)	Hilly stage	Lorena Wiebes (NED)	SD Worx
2	19 May	Sotresgudo to Lerma	118.9 km (73.9 mi)	Hilly stage	Demi Vollering (NED)	SD Worx
3	20 May	Caleruega to Aranda de Duero	112.7 km (70.0 mi)	Flat stage	Lorena Wiebes (NED)	SD Worx
4	21 May	Tordómar to Lagunas de Neila	121.5 km (75.5 mi)	Medium-mountain stage	Demi Vollering (NED)	SD Worx
Total			468.7 km (291.2 mi)			

== Summary ==
Prior to the race, Demi Vollering of SD Worx was considered the favourite, following a run of victories in the Ardennes classics and two second-place finishes at La Vuelta Femenina and Itzulia Women.

In the race, the first stage was won by Lorena Wiebes of SD Worx, beating Elisa Balsamo of Trek–Segafredo in a bunch sprint. The second stage was affected by crosswinds, with just 12 riders at the front at the final kilometre. After a sprint up a cobbled climb up to the finish in Lerma, Wiebes crossed the line first. However, she was later considered to have "bodychecked" Chloé Dygert of Canyon–SRAM with 150 metres to go, and was relegated to third place. Vollering therefore took the stage win, with Wiebes retaining the lead in the general classification.

The third stage involved a seven rider breakaway that escaped with 40 km remaining. With 10 km to go, the breakaway had a lead of over a minute – and the peloton gave chase. Into the final kilometre, the breakaway still had a 15-second lead, however the sprint of Lorena Wiebes on an uphill finish allowed her to take a second stage win, with Balsamo second. Third place was taken by breakaway rider Sheyla Gutiérrez of Movistar Team. Wiebes retained her overall lead of the race.

The final stage involved a mountain top finish at Lagunas de Neila, a 12 kilometre climb with an average gradient of 6.3%. As the peloton took to the climb, Wiebes had been dropped. On the climb, a fast pace was set by Marlen Reusser of SD Work. When she pulled off with 9.km to go, only 18 riders remained. Vollering then accelerated hard, with only Shirin van Anrooij of Trek–Segafredo able to follow her. With 8 kilometres of climbing to go, Vollering dropped van Anrooij, powering up the remainder of the stage to win by 1 minute 35 seconds.

Vollering therefore won the Vuelta a Burgos Feminas by over 2 minutes, with van Anrooij holding off Ashleigh Moolman-Pasio of AG Insurance–Soudal–Quick-Step for second place. Vollering took the mountains classification, Wiebes retained the points classification and van Anrooij won the young rider classification.

== Result ==
Final general classification
Rank	Rider	Team	Time
1	Demi Vollering (NED)	SD Worx	11h 46' 12"
2	Shirin van Anrooij (NED)	Trek–Segafredo	+ 2' 07"
3	Ashleigh Moolman-Pasio (RSA)	AG Insurance–Soudal–Quick-Step	+ 2' 11"
4	Chloé Dygert (USA)	Canyon//SRAM	+ 2' 43"
5	Marlen Reusser (SUI)	SD Worx	+ 3' 09"
6	Agnieszka Skalniak-Sójka (POL)	Canyon//SRAM	+ 3' 21"
7	Tamara Dronova	Israel Premier Tech Roland	+ 3' 48"
8	Soraya Paladin (ITA)	Canyon//SRAM	+ 3' 59"
9	Silvia Persico (ITA)	UAE Team ADQ	+ 4' 05"
10	Erica Magnaldi (ITA)	UAE Team ADQ	+ 4' 07"

== See also ==
- 2023 in women's road cycling
