= 2024 Tour de Romandie Féminin =

2024 UCI Women's World Tour, race 24 of 27

Race details
- Dates: 6–8 September 2024
- Stages: 3
- Distance: 379.9 km (236.1 mi)
- Winning time: 9h 58' 21"

Results
Jersey awarded to the overall winner	Winner	Lotte Kopecky (BEL)	(Team SD Worx–Protime)
	Second	Demi Vollering (NED)	(Team SD Worx–Protime)
	Third	Gaia Realini (ITA)	(Lidl–Trek)
Jersey awarded to the points classification winner	Points	Elisa Balsamo (ITA)	(Lidl–Trek)
Jersey awarded to the mountains classification winner	Mountains	Lotte Kopecky (BEL)	(Team SD Worx–Protime)
Jersey awarded to the youth classification winner	Youth	Gaia Realini (ITA)	(Lidl–Trek)
	Team	(Netherlands) Team SD Worx–Protime	

The 2024 Tour de Romandie Féminin was the 3rd edition of the Tour de Romandie Féminin road cycling stage race, which was the part of the 2024 UCI Women's World Tour. It began on 6th of September in La Grande Béroche and finished on the 8th of September in Morges.

== Teams ==
Fifteen UCI Women's WorldTeams, one UCI Women's Continental Team and one national team made up the seventeen teams took part in the race.

UCI Women's WorldTeams

- AG Insurance–Soudal
- Canyon//SRAM
- Ceratizit–WNT Pro Cycling
- FDJ–Suez
- Fenix–Deceuninck
- Human Powered Health
- Lidl–Trek
- Movistar Team
- Liv AlUla Jayco
- Roland
- Team dsm–firmenich PostNL
- Team SD Worx–Protime
- UAE Team ADQ
- Uno-X Mobility
- Visma–Lease a Bike

UCI Continental Teams

- Cofidis

National Teams

- Switzerland

== Route ==
Stage characteristics and winners
Stage	Date	Course	Distance	Type	Stage winner
1	6 September	La Grande Béroche to Lausanne	133.8 km (83.1 mi)	Hilly stage	Elisa Balsamo (ITA)
2	7 September	Chippis to Vercorin	101.9 km (63.3 mi)	Mountain stage	Demi Vollering (NED)
3	8 September	Morges to Morges	144.2 km (89.6 mi)	Hilly stage	Riejanne Markus (NED)
Total			379.9 km (236.1 mi)		

== Stages ==
=== Stage 1 ===
6 September — La Grande Béroche to Lausanne, 133.8 km (83.1 mi)

Stage 1 Result
Rank	Rider	Team	Time
1	Elisa Balsamo (ITA)	Lidl–Trek	3h 29' 15"
2	Lotte Kopecky (BEL)	Team SD Worx–Protime	+ 0"
3	Liane Lippert (GER)	Movistar Team	+ 0"
4	Noemi Rüegg (SUI)	Switzerland	+ 0"
5	Mavi García (ESP)	Liv AlUla Jayco	+ 0"
6	Nienke Vinke (NED)	Team dsm–firmenich PostNL	+ 0"
7	Ashleigh Moolman (RSA)	AG Insurance–Soudal	+ 0"
8	Demi Vollering (NED)	Team SD Worx–Protime	+ 0"
9	Évita Muzic (FRA)	FDJ–Suez	+ 0"
10	Juliette Labous (FRA)	Team dsm–firmenich PostNL	+ 0"

General classification after Stage 1
Rank	Rider	Team	Time
1	Elisa Balsamo (ITA)	Lidl–Trek	3h 29' 05"
2	Lotte Kopecky (BEL)	Team SD Worx–Protime	+ 4"
3	Liane Lippert (GER)	Movistar Team	+ 6"
4	Noemi Rüegg (SUI)	Switzerland	+ 10"
5	Mavi García (ESP)	Liv AlUla Jayco	+ 10"
6	Nienke Vinke (NED)	Team dsm–firmenich PostNL	+ 10"
7	Ashleigh Moolman (RSA)	AG Insurance–Soudal	+ 10"
8	Demi Vollering (NED)	Team SD Worx–Protime	+ 10"
9	Évita Muzic (FRA)	FDJ–Suez	+ 10"
10	Juliette Labous (FRA)	Team dsm–firmenich PostNL	+ 10"

=== Stage 2 ===
7 September — Chippis to Vercorin, 101.9 km (63.3 mi)

Stage 2 Result
Rank	Rider	Team	Time
1	Demi Vollering (NED)	Team SD Worx–Protime	2h 50' 17"
2	Lotte Kopecky (BEL)	Team SD Worx–Protime	+ 0"
3	Gaia Realini (ITA)	Lidl–Trek	+ 34"
4	Mavi García (ESP)	Liv AlUla Jayco	+ 49"
5	Juliette Labous (FRA)	Team dsm–firmenich PostNL	+ 54"
6	Niamh Fisher-Black (NZL)	Team SD Worx–Protime	+ 1' 02"
7	Sarah Gigante (AUS)	AG Insurance–Soudal	+ 1' 06"
8	Ashleigh Moolman (RSA)	AG Insurance–Soudal	+ 1' 16"
9	Lore De Schepper (BEL)	AG Insurance–Soudal	+ 1' 22"
10	Cédrine Kerbaol (FRA)	Ceratizit–WNT Pro Cycling	+ 1' 27"

General classification after Stage 2
Rank	Rider	Team	Time
1	Lotte Kopecky (BEL)	Team SD Worx–Protime	6h 19' 20"
2	Demi Vollering (NED)	Team SD Worx–Protime	+ 2"
3	Gaia Realini (ITA)	Lidl–Trek	+ 42"
4	Mavi García (ESP)	Liv AlUla Jayco	+ 1' 01"
5	Juliette Labous (FRA)	Team dsm–firmenich PostNL	+ 1' 06"
6	Niamh Fisher-Black (NZL)	Team SD Worx–Protime	+ 1' 14"
7	Sarah Gigante (AUS)	AG Insurance–Soudal	+ 1' 18"
8	Ashleigh Moolman (RSA)	AG Insurance–Soudal	+ 1' 28"
9	Lore De Schepper (BEL)	AG Insurance–Soudal	+ 1' 34"
10	Cédrine Kerbaol (FRA)	Ceratizit–WNT Pro Cycling	+ 1' 39"

=== Stage 3 ===
8 September — Morges to Morges, 144.2 km (89.6 mi)

Stage 3 Result
Rank	Rider	Team	Time
1	Riejanne Markus (NED)	Visma–Lease a Bike	3h 38' 44"
2	Niamh Fisher-Black (NZL)	Team SD Worx–Protime	+ 0"
3	Lotte Kopecky (BEL)	Team SD Worx–Protime	+ 21"
4	Noemi Rüegg (SUI)	Switzerland	+ 21"
5	Eleonora Gasparrini (ITA)	UAE Team ADQ	+ 21"
6	Liane Lippert (GER)	Movistar Team	+ 21"
7	Mareille Meijering (NED)	Movistar Team	+ 21"
8	Ingvild Gåskjenn (NOR)	Liv AlUla Jayco	+ 21"
9	Lore De Schepper (BEL)	AG Insurance–Soudal	+ 21"
10	Juliette Labous (FRA)	Team dsm–firmenich PostNL	+ 21"

General classification after Stage 3
Rank	Rider	Team	Time
1	Lotte Kopecky (BEL)	Team SD Worx–Protime	9h 58' 21"
2	Demi Vollering (NED)	Team SD Worx–Protime	+ 6"
3	Gaia Realini (ITA)	Lidl–Trek	+ 46"
4	Niamh Fisher-Black (NZL)	Team SD Worx–Protime	+ 51"
5	Mavi García (ESP)	Liv AlUla Jayco	+ 1' 05"
6	Juliette Labous (FRA)	Team dsm–firmenich PostNL	+ 1' 10"
7	Ashleigh Moolman (RSA)	AG Insurance–Soudal	+ 1' 32"
8	Lore De Schepper (BEL)	AG Insurance–Soudal	+ 1' 38"
9	Cédrine Kerbaol (FRA)	Ceratizit–WNT Pro Cycling	+ 1' 43"
10	Nienke Vinke (NED)	Team dsm–firmenich PostNL	+ 2' 07"

== Classification leadership table ==
Classification leadership by stage
Stage	Winner	General classification	Points classification	Mountains classification	Young rider classification	Team classification
1	Elisa Balsamo	Elisa Balsamo	Elisa Balsamo	Yara Kastelijn	Noemi Rüegg	Team SD Worx–Protime
2	Demi Vollering	Lotte Kopecky	Elisa Balsamo	Lotte Kopecky	Gaia Realini	Team SD Worx–Protime
3	Riejanne Markus	Lotte Kopecky	Elisa Balsamo	Lotte Kopecky	Gaia Realini	Team SD Worx–Protime
Final		Lotte Kopecky	Elisa Balsamo	Lotte Kopecky	Gaia Realini	Team SD Worx–Protime

== Classification standings ==
Legend
Denotes the winner of the general classification	Denotes the winner of the mountains classification
Denotes the winner of the points classification	Denotes the winner of the young rider classification

=== General classification ===
Final general classification (1–10)
Rank	Rider	Team	Time
1	Lotte Kopecky (BEL)	Team SD Worx–Protime	9h 58' 21"
2	Demi Vollering (NED)	Team SD Worx–Protime	+ 6"
3	Gaia Realini (ITA)	Lidl–Trek	+ 46"
4	Niamh Fisher-Black (NZL)	Team SD Worx–Protime	+ 51"
5	Mavi García (ESP)	Liv AlUla Jayco	+ 1' 05"
6	Juliette Labous (FRA)	Team dsm–firmenich PostNL	+ 1' 10"
7	Ashleigh Moolman (RSA)	AG Insurance–Soudal	+ 1' 32"
8	Lore de Schepper (BEL)	AG Insurance–Soudal	+ 1' 38"
9	Cédrine Kerbaol (FRA)	Ceratizit–WNT Pro Cycling	+ 1' 43"
10	Nienke Vinke (NED)	Team dsm–firmenich PostNL	+ 2' 07"

=== Points classification ===
Final points classification (1–10)
Rank	Rider	Team	Points
1	Elisa Balsamo (ITA)	Lidl–Trek	80
2	Lotte Kopecky (BEL)	Team SD Worx–Protime	75
3	Riejanne Markus (NED)	Visma–Lease a Bike	60
4	Niamh Fisher-Black (NZL)	Team SD Worx–Protime	60
5	Demi Vollering (NED)	Team SD Worx–Protime	40
6	Christine Majerus (LUX)	Team SD Worx–Protime	40
7	Mavi García (ESP)	Liv AlUla Jayco	37
8	Noemi Rüegg (SUI)	Switzerland	36
9	Liane Lippert (GER)	Movistar Team	34
10	Juliette Labous (FRA)	Team dsm–firmenich PostNL	31

=== Mountains classification ===
Final mountains classification (1–10)
Rank	Rider	Team	Points
1	Lotte Kopecky (BEL)	Team SD Worx–Protime	18
2	Yara Kastelijn (NED)	Fenix–Deceuninck	15
3	Demi Vollering (NED)	Team SD Worx–Protime	12
4	Niamh Fisher-Black (NZL)	Team SD Worx–Protime	10
5	Femke Gerritse (NLD)	Team SD Worx–Protime	7
6	Gaia Realini (ITA)	Lidl–Trek	6
7	Riejanne Markus (NED)	Visma–Lease a Bike	6
8	Elise Chabbey (SUI)	Canyon//SRAM	6
9	Caroline Andersson (SWE)	Liv AlUla Jayco	5
10	Mavi García (ESP)	Liv AlUla Jayco	5

=== Young rider classification ===
Final young rider classification (1–10)
Rank	Rider	Team	Time
1	Gaia Realini (ITA)	Lidl–Trek	9h 59' 07"
2	Niamh Fisher-Black (NZL)	Team SD Worx–Protime	+ 5"
3	Sarah Gigante (AUS)	AG Insurance–Soudal	+ 36"
4	Lore de Schepper (BEL)	AG Insurance–Soudal	+ 52"
5	Cédrine Kerbaol (FRA)	Ceratizit–WNT Pro Cycling	+ 57"
6	Nienke Vinke (NED)	Team dsm–firmenich PostNL	+ 1' 21"
7	Antonia Niedermaier (GER)	Canyon//SRAM	+ 1' 52"
8	Noemi Rüegg (SUI)	Switzerland	+ 2' 19"
9	Caroline Andersson (SWE)	Liv AlUla Jayco	+ 2' 53"
10	Barbara Malcotti (ITA)	Human Powered Health	+ 3' 03"

=== Team classification ===
Final team classification (1–10)
Rank	Team	Time
1	(Netherlands) Team SD Worx–Protime	29h 56' 32"
2	(Belgium) AG Insurance–Soudal	+ 3' 03"
3	(Australia) Liv AlUla Jayco	+ 6' 02"
4	(Netherlands) Team dsm–firmenich PostNL	+ 12' 59"
5	(Spain) Movistar Team	+ 15' 26"
6	(Netherlands) Visma–Lease a Bike	+ 16' 08"
7	(Germany) Canyon//SRAM	+ 17' 21"
8	(Germany) Ceratizit–WNT Pro Cycling	+ 19' 17"
9	(Belgium) Fenix–Deceuninck	+ 20' 26"
10	(United States) Lidl–Trek	+ 25' 57"
