= 2023 Dwars door Vlaanderen for Women =

Cycling race

2023 UCI Women's ProSeries, race 3 of 8
- Event poster with previous winners Mathieu van der Poel and Chiara Consonni

Race details
- Dates: 29 March 2023
- Stages: 1
- Distance: 114.9 km (71.4 mi)
- Winning time: 2h 53' 04"

Results
	Winner	Demi Vollering (NED)	(SD Worx)
	Second	Chiara Consonni (ITA)	(UAE Team ADQ)
	Third	Marianne Vos (NED)	(Team Jumbo–Visma)

The 2023 Dwars door Vlaanderen for Women was a road cycling one-day race that took place on 29 March. It was the 11th edition of the women's Dwars door Vlaanderen and the third event in the 2023 UCI Women's ProSeries.

The race was won by Dutch rider Demi Vollering of SD Worx ahead of Chiara Consonni and Marianne Vos after a 9.8-kilometre (6.1 mi) solo ride.

== Teams ==
Fourteen UCI Women's WorldTeams and ten UCI Women's ProTeams took part in the race.

UCI Women's WorldTeams

- EF Education–Tibco–SVB
- FDJ–Suez
- Fenix–Deceuninck
- Human Powered Health
- Israel–Premier Tech
- Liv Racing TeqFind
- Movistar Team
- SD Worx
- Team DSM
- Team Jayco–AlUla
- Team Jumbo–Visma
- Trek–Segafredo
- UAE Team ADQ
- Uno-X Pro Cycling Team

UCI Women's ProTeams

- AG Insurance–Soudal–Quick-Step
- Ceratizit–WNT Pro Cycling
- Cofidis
- Duolar-Chevalmeire
- Lifeplus Wahoo
- Lotto–Dstny Ladies
- Parkhotel Valkenburg
- Proximus-Alphamotorhomes-Doltcini
- Team Coop–Hitec Products
- Zaaf Cycling Team

== Result ==
Result
Rank	Rider	Team	Time
1	Demi Vollering (NED)	SD Worx	2h 53' 04"
2	Chiara Consonni (ITA)	UAE Team ADQ	+ 38"
3	Marianne Vos (NED)	Team Jumbo–Visma	+ 38"
4	Vittoria Guazzini (ITA)	FDJ–Suez	+ 38"
5	Ruby Roseman-Gannon (AUS)	Team Jayco–AlUla	+ 38"
6	Floortje Mackaij (NED)	Movistar Team	+ 38"
7	Marlen Reusser (SUI)	SD Worx	+ 38"
8	Liane Lippert (GER)	Movistar Team	+ 38"
9	Shirin van Anrooij (NED)	Trek–Segafredo	+ 38"
10	Ashleigh Moolman Pasio (SAF)	AG Insurance–Soudal–Quick-Step	+ 38"
