= 2022 Vuelta a Burgos Feminas =

Women's road cycling stage race in Spain

2022 UCI Women's World Tour, race 12 of 23

Race details
- Dates: 19–22 May 2021
- Stages: 4
- Distance: 488.4 km (303.5 mi)
- Winning time: 13h 06' 28"

Results
Jersey awarded to the overall winner	Winner	Juliette Labous (FRA)	(Team DSM)
	Second	Évita Muzic (FRA)	(FDJ Nouvelle-Aquitaine Futuroscope)
	Third	Demi Vollering (NED)	(SD Worx)
Jersey awarded to the points classification winner	Points	Lotte Kopecky (BEL)	(SD Worx)
Jersey awarded to the mountains classification winner	Mountains	Demi Vollering (NED)	(SD Worx)
Jersey awarded to the youth classification winner	Youth	Évita Muzic (FRA)	(FDJ Nouvelle-Aquitaine Futuroscope)
	Team	SD Worx	

The 2022 Vuelta a Burgos Feminas was a road cycling stage race that took place in the province of Burgos in northern Spain between 19 and 22 May 2022. It was the seventh edition of the Vuelta a Burgos Feminas.

The race was won by French rider Juliette Labous of Team DSM.

== Route ==
Stage characteristics and winners
Stage	Date	Route	Distance	Type	Winner
1	19 May	Pedrosa del Príncipe to Aranda de Duero	121.9 km (75.7 mi)	Intermediate stage	Lotte Kopecky (BEL)
2	20 May	Sasamón to Aguilar de Campoo	128 km (80 mi)	Intermediate stage	Matilde Vitillo (ITA)
3	21 May	Medina de Pomar to Ojo Guareña	113.4 km (70.5 mi)	Intermediate stage	Mavi Garcia (ESP)
4	22 May	Covarrubias to Lagunas de Neila	125.1 km (77.7 mi)	Intermediate stage	Demi Vollering (NED)
Total			488.4 km (303.5 mi)		
