= Tour de Romandie Féminin =

Swiss multi-day road cycling race

Race details
- Date: October
- Region: Romandie, Switzerland
- Discipline: Road
- Competition: UCI Women's World Tour
- Type: Stage race
- Web site: tourderomandiefeminin.ch

History
- First edition: 2022
- Editions: 4 (as of 2025)
- First winner: Ashleigh Moolman-Pasio (RSA)
- Most recent: Elise Chabbey (SUI)

The Tour de Romandie Féminin is a women's cycle stage race in Switzerland, part of the UCI Women's World Tour. The race runs through the Romandie region, or French-speaking part of Switzerland – using roads in the Jura Mountains and Alpine mountain ranges.

== History ==
The Tour de Romandie is a longstanding men's stage race, being first held in 1947 to celebrate the 50 year anniversary of Swiss Cycling. In 2022, the organisation behind the race announced that Tour de Romandie Féminin would be held for the first time in 2022 – as part of the celebrations of 75 years of the race.

The first event was held in October 2022, over 3 days. The first stage was a circuit race in Lausanne, the second stage was from Sion to the ski resort of Thyon 2000 and the final stage was from Fribourg to Geneva – where the first men's Tour de Romandie ended in 1947. In 2025, five teams were disqualified prior to the start of the race, following a refusal to participate in a GPS tracking technology test.

In May 2026, the 2026 edition was cancelled due to a "shortfall" in sponsorship and other major events being held in the region, including the Grand Départ of the Tour de France Femmes which will take place in Switzerland.

== Winners ==
Year	Rider	Team
2022	Ashleigh Moolman-Pasio (RSA)	SD Worx
2023	Demi Vollering (NED)	SD Worx
2024	Lotte Kopecky (BEL)	SD Worx
2025	Elise Chabbey (SUI)	FDJ–Suez
2026	Cancelled	
