= 2024 La Flèche Wallonne Femmes =

Cycling race

UCI Women's World Tour, race 13 of 27
- Event poster

Race details
- Dates: 17 April 2024
- Stages: 1
- Distance: 143.5 km (89.2 mi)
- Winning time: 3h 55' 29"

Results
	Winner	Katarzyna Niewiadoma (POL)	(Canyon//SRAM)
	Second	Demi Vollering (NED)	(Team SD Worx–Protime)
	Third	Elisa Longo Borghini (ITA)	(Lidl–Trek)

The 2024 La Flèche Wallonne Femmes was a road cycling one-day race that took place on 17 April from the Belgian city of Huy. It was the 27th edition of La Flèche Wallonne Femmes and the 13th event of the 2024 UCI World Tour.

The race was won by Polish rider Katarzyna Niewiadoma of Canyon–SRAM for the first time.

== Course ==
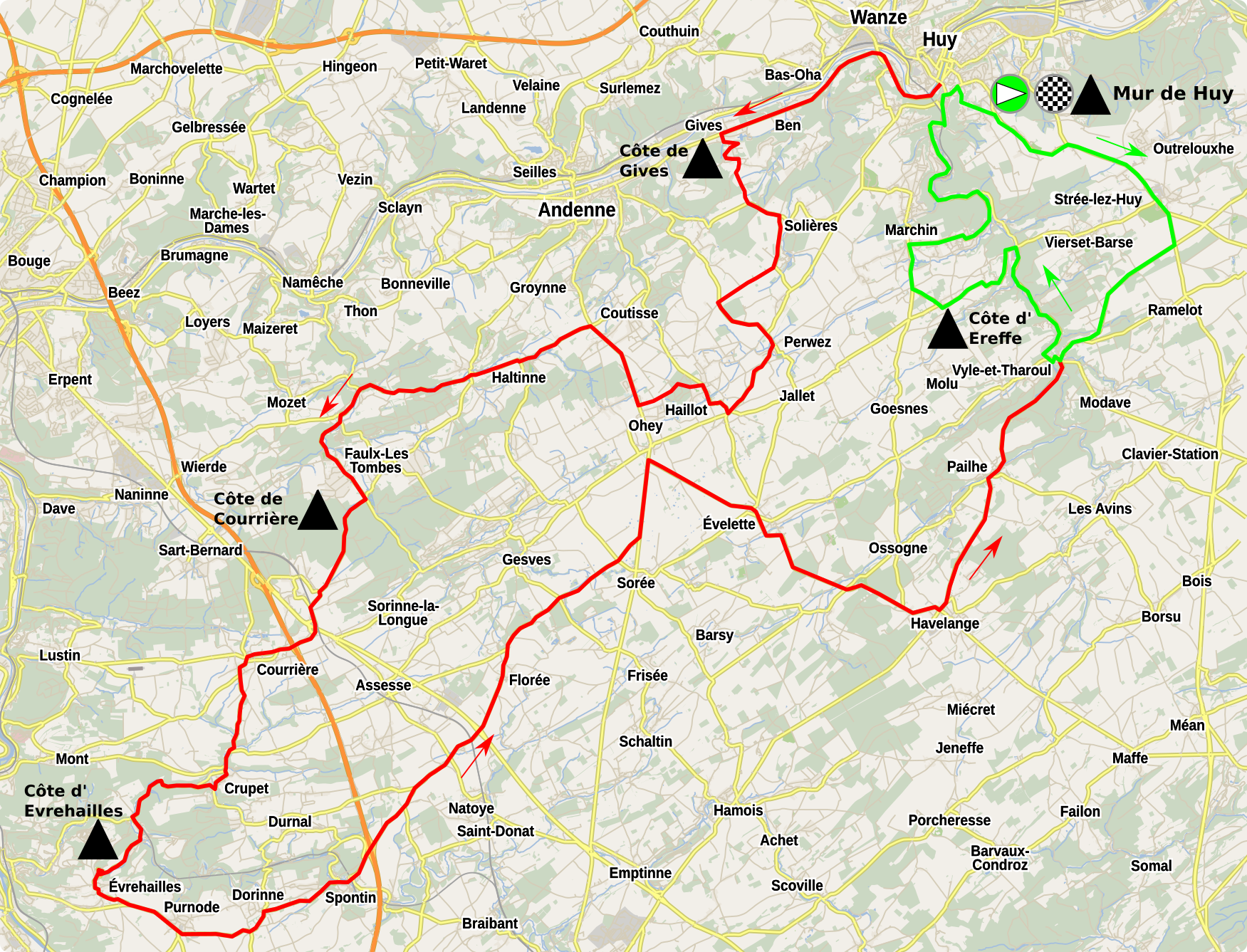
Course map

The 143.5 kilometres (89.2 mi) course started and finished in Huy, with the finish line on the top of the final ascent of the Mur de Huy. The course was around 15 kilometres (9.3 mi) longer than the 2023 edition, omitting an ascent of the Mur de Huy, but including climbs of Gives, Courrière and Évrehailles instead.

The race featured 7 categorised climbs:

- 7 km: Côte de Gives
- 35 km: Côte de Courrière
- 50 km: Côte d’Évrehailles
- 99 km: Côte d'Ereffe – 2.1 km climb at 5%
- 111 km: Mur de Huy – 1.3 km climb at 9.6%
- 130 km: Côte d'Ereffe – 2.1 km climb at 5%
- 143.5 km: Mur de Huy – 1.3 km climb at 9.6%

== Teams ==
Twenty-four teams took part in the race. Of the 139 riders who started the race, 106 finished.

UCI Women's WorldTeams

- AG Insurance–Soudal
- Canyon//SRAM
- FDJ–Suez
- Fenix–Deceuninck
- Human Powered Health
- Lidl–Trek
- Liv AlUla Jayco
- Movistar Team
- Roland
- Team dsm–firmenich PostNL
- Team SD Worx–Protime
- UAE Team ADQ
- Uno-X Mobility
- Visma–Lease a Bike

UCI Women's Continental Teams

- Arkéa–B&B Hotels Women
- Bepink–Bongioanni
- Chevalmeire
- Cofidis
- EF Education–Cannondale
- Laboral Kutxa–Fundación Euskadi
- Lotto–Dstny Ladies
- St. Michel–Mavic–Auber93
- Team Coop–Repsol
- VolkerWessels Women Cyclingteam

== Result ==
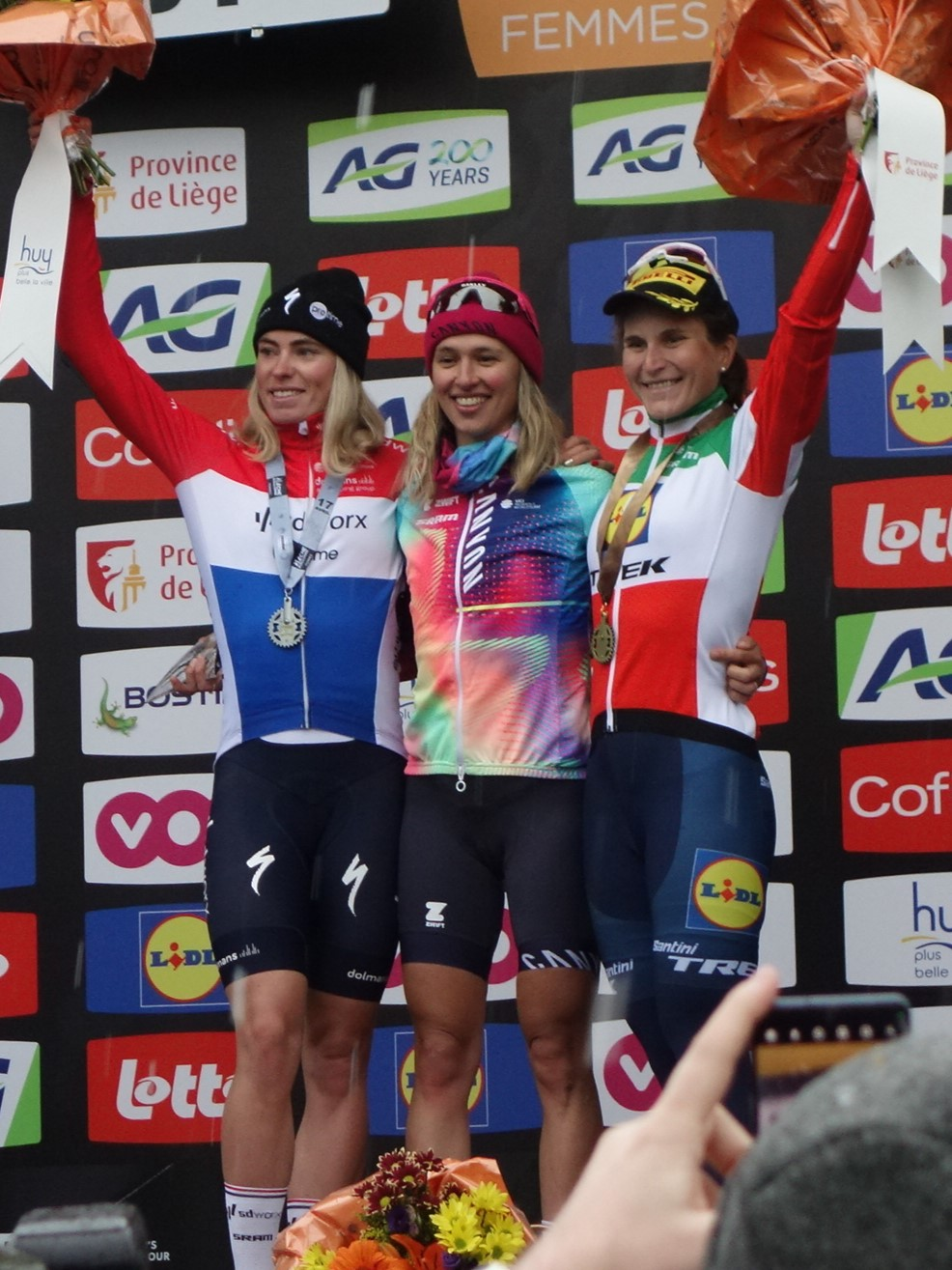
Podium

Result
Rank	Rider	Team	Time
1	Katarzyna Niewiadoma (POL)	Canyon//SRAM	3h 55' 29"
2	Demi Vollering (NED)	Team SD Worx–Protime	+ 2"
3	Elisa Longo Borghini (ITA)	Lidl–Trek	+ 4"
4	Evita Muzic (FRA)	FDJ–Suez	+ 7"
5	Ashleigh Moolman Pasio (ZA)	AG Insurance–Soudal	+ 11"
6	Pauliena Rooijakkers (NED)	Liv AlUla Jayco	+ 15"
7	Juliette Labous (FRA)	Team dsm–firmenich PostNL	+ 19"
8	Fem Van Empel (NED)	Visma–Lease a Bike	+ 24"
9	Marta Cavalli (ITA)	FDJ–Suez	+ 27"
10	Ane Santesteban Gonzalez (SPA)	Liv AlUla Jayco	+ 27"
