= Itzulia Women =

Spanish multi-day road cycling race

Race details
- Date: May
- Region: Basque Country, Spain
- Discipline: Road
- Competition: UCI Women's World Tour
- Type: Stage race
- Organiser: OCETA
- Race director: Julián Eraso
- Web site: itzulia-women.eus/en/itzulia/

History
- First edition: 2022
- Editions: 5 (as of 2026)
- First winner: Demi Vollering (NED)
- Most wins: Demi Vollering (NED) (3 wins)
- Most recent: Mischa Bredewold (NED)

The Itzulia Women is a women's cycle stage race in Spain, part of the UCI Women's World Tour. The race takes place in the Basque Country in northern Spain, on tough, hilly roads similar to the Clásica de San Sebastián.

== History ==
The Tour of the Basque Country is a longstanding men's stage race, being first held in 1924. In 2019 and 2021, one-day races for professional women were held on a similar course to the Clásica de San Sebastián. In 2021, a 'Tour of the Basque Country' for women was proposed to replace the women's Clásica de San Sebastián.

The first edition of Itzulia Women took place over 3 days in 2022 and was won by Demi Vollering. Euskadi Cycling Organisations president Julián Eraso was criticised by the organiser and local politicians for sexism, after he stated that "we have almost forced to organise [the race]; it's a matter of fashion". The race uses the hilly landscape of the Basque Country, including the steep Jaizkibel climb (7.9 km at 5.6%) used in the Clásica de San Sebastián.

The first three editions of the race were dominated by SD Worx, with the team winning all stages, and winning four out of five classifications in both 2023 and 2024. In 2025, Vollering won the race for the third time, racing for her new team FDJ–Suez.

== Winners ==
Year	Country	Rider	Team
2022	Netherlands	Demi Vollering	SD Worx
2023	Switzerland	Marlen Reusser	SD Worx
2024	Netherlands	Demi Vollering	Team SD Worx–Protime
2025	Netherlands	Demi Vollering	FDJ–Suez
2026	Netherlands	Mischa Bredewold	Team SD Worx–Protime

== Winners of secondary classifications ==
Year	Points Classification	Mountains Classification	Youth Classification	Team Classification
2022	Demi Vollering (NED)	Elise Chabbey (SUI)	Niamh Fisher-Black (NZL)	Team DSM
2023	Marlen Reusser (SUI)	Demi Vollering (NED)	Ella Wyllie (NZL)	SD Worx
2024	Demi Vollering (NED)	Demi Vollering (NED)	Ella Wyllie (NZL)	Team SD Worx–Protime
2025	Mischa Bredewold (NED)	Demi Vollering (NED)	Antonia Niedermaier (GER)	Canyon//SRAM Zondacrypto
2026	Mischa Bredewold (NED)	Yara Kastelijn (NED)	Ema Comte (FRA)	FDJ–Suez
