= Magdeleine Vallieres =

Canadian cyclist

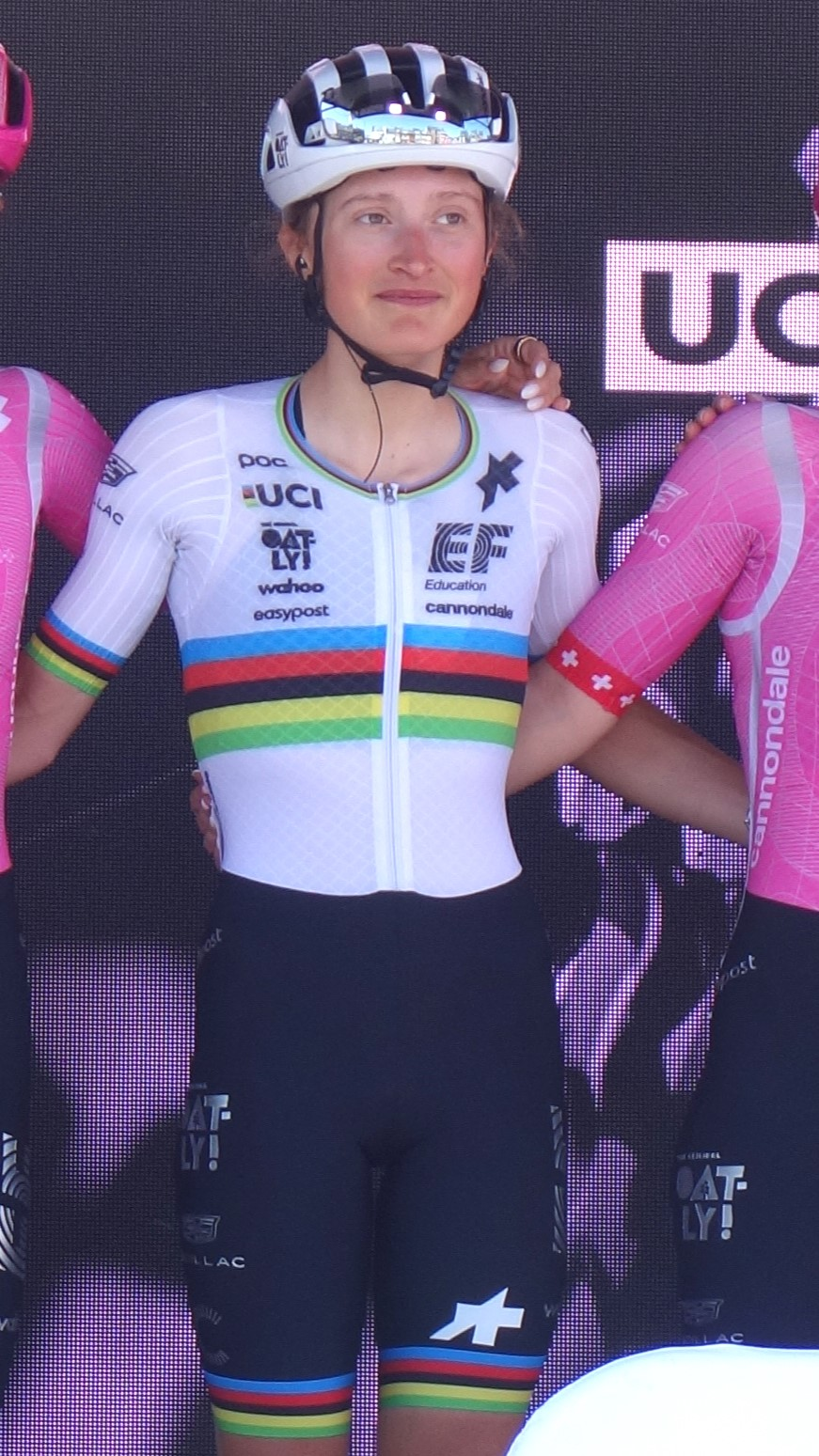
- Vallieres in the rainbow jersey in 2026

Personal information
- Full name: Magdeleine Vallieres Mill
- Born: 10 August 2001 (age 25) Sherbrooke, Quebec, Canada

Cycling career
- Sport: Cycling
- Current team: EF Education–Oatly
- Disciplines: Road; Mountain biking; Cyclo-cross
- Role: Rider

Amateur teams
- 2016–2017: CC Sherbrooke
- 2018–2019: Québecor–Stingray
- 2019: Watersley Race Development Team

Professional teams
- 2020–2021: WCC Team
- 2022–2023: EF Education–Tibco–SVB
- 2024–: EF Education–Cannondale

Major wins
- One-day races and Classics World Road Race Championship (2025)
Medal record
Women's road bicycle racing
Representing Canada
World Championships
Gold medal – first place	2025 Kigali	Road race

Magdeleine Vallieres Mill (born 10 August 2001) is a Canadian professional racing cyclist, the 2025 World Champion, who currently rides for UCI Women's WorldTeam EF Education–Oatly. She rode in the women's road race event at the 2020 UCI Road World Championships. At the 2019 Global Relay Canadian Road Championships, she won the junior women road race and junior women time trial. She represented Canada in the junior women road race and in the junior women time trial at the 2019 UCI Road World Championships. In the 2025 UCI Road World Championships she won the elite women road race.

== Major results ==
2018
3rd Time trial, National Junior Road Championships
2019
National Junior Road Championships

1st Road race
1st Time trial

6th White Spot / Delta Road Race
10th Road race, UCI Road World Junior Championships
2021
7th Overall Watersley Challenge
2024 (1 pro win)
1st Trofeo Palma
2025 (1)
1st Road race, UCI Road World Championships
7th Giro dell'Emilia
8th Grand Prix de Wallonie
10th Tre Valli Varesine
2026
5th Strade Bianche
6th La Flèche Wallonne
8th Liège–Bastogne–Liège
