= Ella Wyllie =

New Zealand cyclist

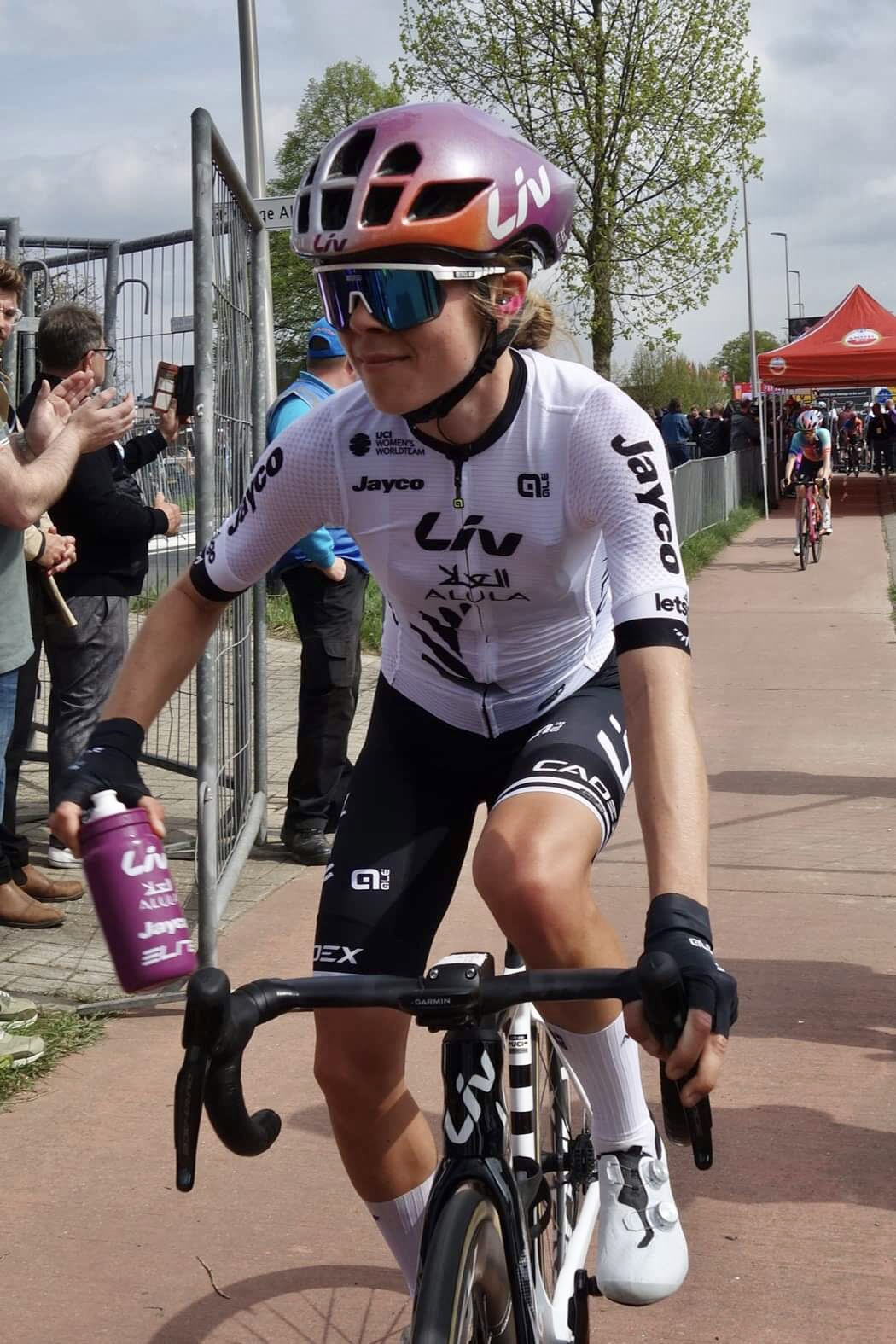

Personal information
- Born: 1 September 2002 (age 24)

Cycling career
- Sport: Cycling
- Current team: Liv AlUla Jayco
- Discipline: Road
- Role: Rider

Amateur team
- 2020–2021: Velo Project

Professional teams
- 2022: Parkhotel Valkenburg
- 2023: Lifeplus Wahoo
- 2024–: Liv AlUla Jayco

Major wins
- One-day races and Classics National Road Race Championships (2024)

Ella Wyllie (born 1 September 2002) is a New Zealand professional racing cyclist, who currently rides for UCI Women's WorldTeam Liv AlUla Jayco. She is the 2024 New Zealand Women's Road Champion.

== Major results ==
2019
Oceania Junior Road Championships

1st Road race
5th Time trial

National Junior Road Championships

1st Time Trial
4th Road Race

10th Time trial, UCI Junior Road World Championships
2020
National Junior Road Championships

3rd Road Race
4th Time Trial

2022
Oceania Under-23 Road Championships

1st Road race
4th Time trial

2nd Time trial, National Under-23 Road Championships
2nd Overall Watersley Womens Challenge

1st Mountains classification

4th Road race, Oceania Road Championships
2023
1st Young rider classification, Itzulia Women
National Under-23 Road Championships

2nd Road race
3rd Time trial

3rd Clasica Femenina Navarra
4th Road race, National Road Championships
8th Overall Tour Down Under
10th Road race, UCI Under-23 Road World Championships
2024
1st Road race, National Road Championships
National Under-23 Road Championships

1st Road race,
1st Time trial

7th Overall Tour Down Under
9th Overall Vuelta a Burgos Feminas
10th Overall Itzulia Women

1st Young rider classification

2026
8th Cadel Evans Great Ocean Road Race
8th Tour Down Under
