= 2021 The Women's Tour =

2021 UCI Women's World Tour, race 17 of 18
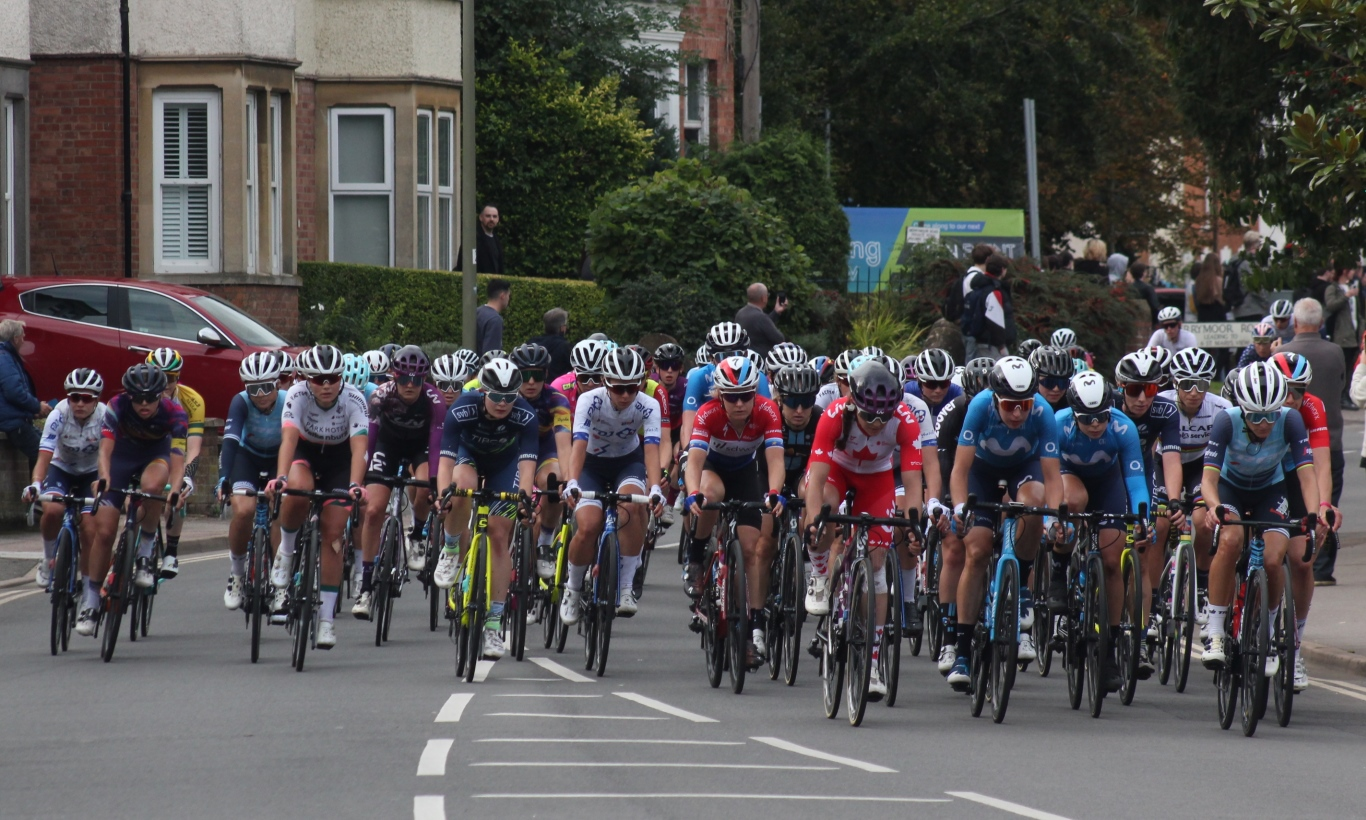
- Stage 1 in Banbury

Race details
- Dates: 4–9 October 2021
- Stages: 6
- Distance: 635 km (394.6 mi)
- Winning time: 15h 54' 38"

Results
Jersey awarded to the overall winner	Winner	Demi Vollering (NED)	(SD Worx)
	Second	Juliette Labous (FRA)	(Team DSM)
	Third	Clara Copponi (FRA)	(FDJ Nouvelle-Aquitaine Futuroscope)
Jersey awarded to the points classification winner	Points	Lorena Wiebes (NED)	(Team DSM)
Jersey awarded to the mountains classification winner	Mountains	Elise Chabbey (SUI)	(Canyon//SRAM)
Jersey awarded to the sprints classification winner	Sprints	Nina Kessler (NED)	(Tibco–Silicon Valley Bank)
	Team	SD Worx	

The 2021 AJ Bell Women's Tour was the seventh staging of The Women's Tour, a women's cycling stage race held in the United Kingdom. It ran from 4 to 9 October 2021, as part of the 2021 UCI Women's World Tour.

The race was won by Dutch rider Demi Vollering of SD Worx, beating French rider Juliette Labous of Team DSM by over a minute. Third place overall was French rider Clara Copponi of FDJ Nouvelle-Aquitaine Futuroscope. The points classification was won by Lorena Wiebes, who won two stages of the race. The mountains classification was won by Elise Chabbey, the sprints classification was won by Nina Kessler, and SD Worx won the team classification.

The race was criticised for not providing live television coverage – a requirement of the UCI Women's World Tour – with highlights available on ITV4 and Eurosport.

== Route ==
Stage schedule
Stage	Date	Course	Distance	Type	Winner
1	4 October	Banbury to Bicester	147.7 km (91.8 mi)	Hilly stage	Marta Bastianelli (ITA)
2	5 October	Walsall to Walsall	102.2 km (63.5 mi)	Hilly stage	Amy Pieters (NED)
3	6 October	Atherstone to Atherstone	16.6 km (10.3 mi)	Individual time trial	Demi Vollering (NED)
4	7 October	Shoeburyness to Southend-on-Sea	117.8 km (73.2 mi)	Flat stage	Lorena Wiebes (NED)
5	8 October	Colchester to Clacton	95.4 km (59.3 mi)	Flat stage	Lorena Wiebes (NED)
6	9 October	Haverhill to Felixstowe	155.3 km (96.5 mi)	Flat stage	Elisa Balsamo (ITA)
Total		635 km (394.6 mi)			

== Classification leadership table ==
Classification leadership by stage
Stage	Winner	General classification	Points classification	Mountains classification	Sprints classification	Team classification
1	Marta Bastianelli	Marta Bastianelli	Marta Bastianelli (Note: On stage 2, Chloe Hosking, who was second in the points classification, wore the cyan jersey, because first-placed Marta Bastianelli wore the blue jersey as the leader of the general classification.)	Demi Vollering	Nina Kessler	SD Worx
2	Amy Pieters	Clara Copponi	Clara Copponi (Note: On stage 3, Sheyla Gutiérrez, who was second in the points classification, wore the cyan jersey, because first-placed Clara Copponi wore the blue jersey as the leader of the general classification.)	Elise Chabbey	Nina Kessler	SD Worx
3	Demi Vollering	Demi Vollering	Clara Copponi	Elise Chabbey	Nina Kessler	SD Worx
4	Lorena Wiebes	Demi Vollering	Sheyla Gutiérrez	Elise Chabbey	Nina Kessler	SD Worx
5	Lorena Wiebes	Demi Vollering	Lorena Wiebes	Elise Chabbey	Nina Kessler	SD Worx
6	Elisa Balsamo	Demi Vollering	Lorena Wiebes	Elise Chabbey	Nina Kessler	SD Worx
Final		Demi Vollering	Lorena Wiebes	Elise Chabbey	Nina Kessler	SD Worx

== Final standings ==
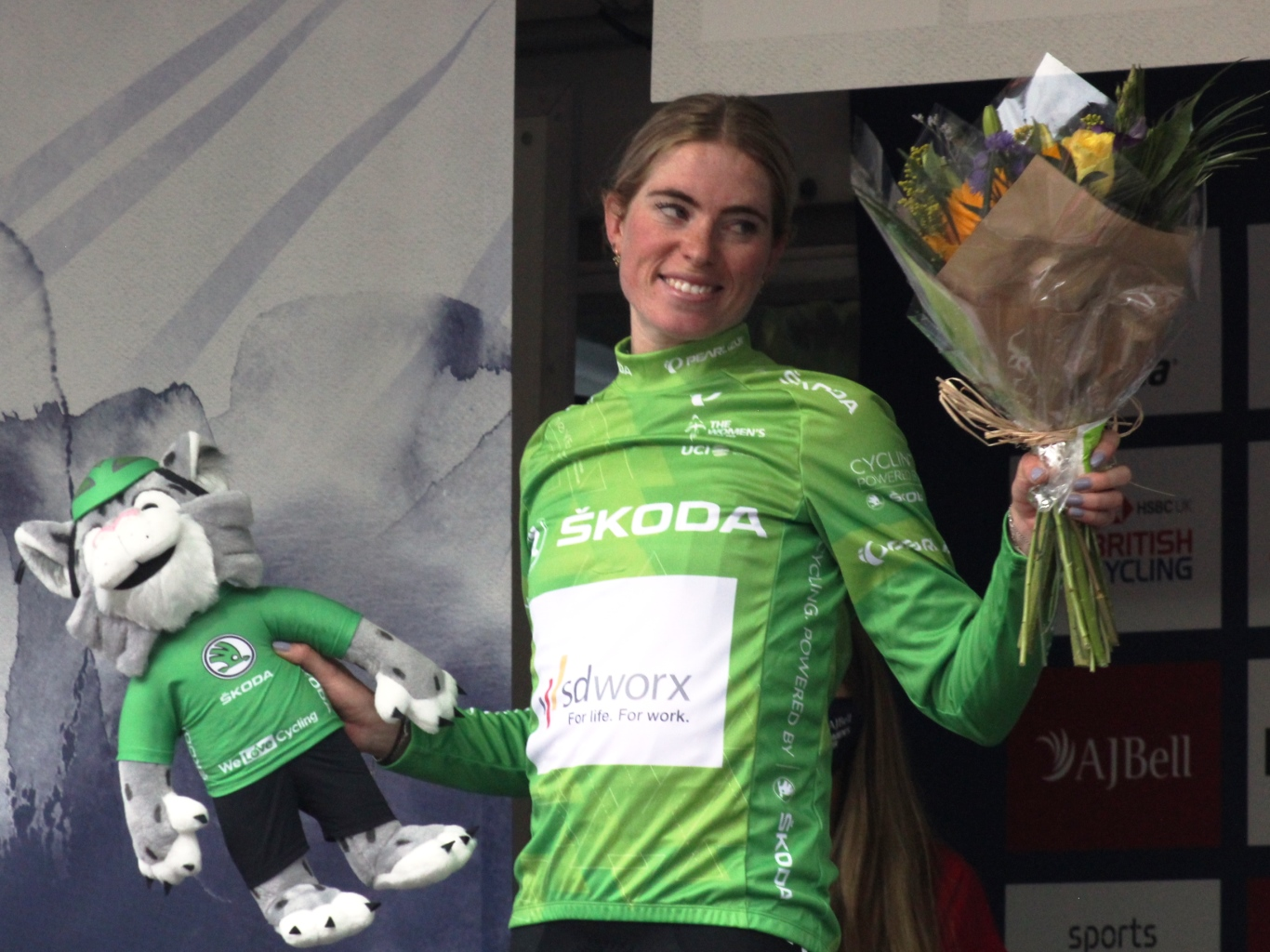
Demi Vollering (wearing the Queen of the Mountains jersey)

Final general classification
Rank	Rider	Team	Time
1	Demi Vollering (NED)	SD Worx	15h 54' 38"
2	Juliette Labous (FRA)	Team DSM	+1' 02"
3	Clara Copponi (FRA)	FDJ Nouvelle-Aquitaine Futuroscope	+1' 05"
4	Amy Pieters (NED)	SD Worx	+1' 07"
5	Aude Biannic (FRA)	Movistar Team	+1' 26"
6	Leah Kirchman (CAN)	Team DSM	+1' 39"
7	Alice Barnes (GBR)	Canyon//SRAM	+1' 41"
8	Pfeiffer Georgi (GBR)	Team DSM	+1' 46"
9	Elise Chabbey (SUI)	Canyon//SRAM	+1' 47"
10	Joscelin Lowden (GBR)	Drops–Le Col	+1' 47"

== See also ==
- 2021 in women's road cycling
