= 2022 Itzulia Women =

Cycling race

2022 UCI Women's World Tour, race 11 of 23

Race details
- Dates: 13–15 May 2022
- Stages: 3
- Distance: 363.6 km (225.9 mi)
- Winning time: 10h 11' 54"

Results
Jersey awarded to the overall winner	Winner	Demi Vollering (NED)	(SD Worx)
	Second	Pauliena Rooijakkers (NED)	(Canyon//SRAM)
	Third	Kristen Faulkner (USA)	(Team BikeExchange–Jayco)
Jersey awarded to the points classification winner	Points	Demi Vollering (NED)	(SD Worx)
Jersey awarded to the mountains classification winner	Mountains	Elise Chabbey (SUI)	(Canyon//SRAM)
Jersey awarded to the youth classification winner	Youth	Niamh Fisher-Black (NZL)	(SD Worx)
	Team	Team DSM	

The 2022 Itzulia Women was a women's cycle stage race that was held in the Basque Country from 13 to 15 May 2022. The 2022 edition of the race was the first running of the Itzulia Women, being held as part of the UCI Women's World Tour.

The race was won by Dutch rider Demi Vollering of SD Worx, who won all three stages of the event.

== Route ==
The race used the hilly landscape of the Basque Country, with thirteen categorised climbs over the 3 stages, including the famed Jaizkibel climb (7.9km at 5.6%) used in the Clásica de San Sebastián.

Stage characteristics and winners
Stage	Date	Route	Distance	Type	Winner	Team
1	13 May	Vitoria-Gasteiz to Labastida	105.9 km (65.8 mi)	Hilly stage	Demi Vollering (NED)	SD Worx
2	14 May	Mallabia to Mallabia	117.9 km (73.3 mi)	Hilly stage	Demi Vollering (NED)	SD Worx
3	15 May	San Sebastián to San Sebastián	139.8 km (86.9 mi)	Hilly stage	Demi Vollering (NED)	SD Worx
Total			363.6 km (225.9 mi)			

== Classification leadership table ==
Classification leadership by stage
Stage	Winner	General classification	Points classification	Mountains classification	Young rider classification	Team classification
1	Demi Vollering	Demi Vollering	Demi Vollering	Elise Chabbey	Niamh Fisher-Black	SD Worx
2	Demi Vollering	Demi Vollering	Demi Vollering	Elise Chabbey	Niamh Fisher-Black	SD Worx
3	Demi Vollering	Demi Vollering	Demi Vollering	Elise Chabbey	Niamh Fisher-Black	Team DSM
Final		Demi Vollering	Demi Vollering	Elise Chabbey	Niamh Fisher-Black	Team DSM

- On stage 2 & 3, Pauliena Rooijakkers, who was second in the points classification, wore the green jersey, because first placed Demi Vollering wore the violet jersey as the leader of the general classification. For the same reason, on stage 2, Heidi Franz, who was second in the mountains classification, wore the red jersey.

== Result ==
Final general classification
Rank	Rider	Team	Time
1	Demi Vollering (NED)	SD Worx	10h 11' 54"
2	Pauliena Rooijakkers (NED)	Canyon//SRAM	+ 47"
3	Kristen Faulkner (USA)	Team BikeExchange–Jayco	+ 1' 07"
4	Marta Cavalli (ITA)	FDJ Nouvelle-Aquitaine Futuroscope	+ 1' 21"
5	Juliette Labous (FRA)	Team DSM	+ 1' 33"
6	Liane Lippert (GER)	Team DSM	+ 1' 44"
7	Niamh Fisher-Black (NZL)	SD Worx	+ 1' 47"
8	Floortje Mackaij (NED)	Team DSM	+ 1' 47"
9	Paula Patiño (COL)	Movistar Team	+ 1' 50"
10	Veronica Ewers (USA)	EF Education–Tibco–SVB	+ 1' 50"

== See also ==
- 2022 in women's road cycling
