= 2021 Liège–Bastogne–Liège Femmes =

Cycling race

2021 UCI Women's World Tour, race 8 of 18
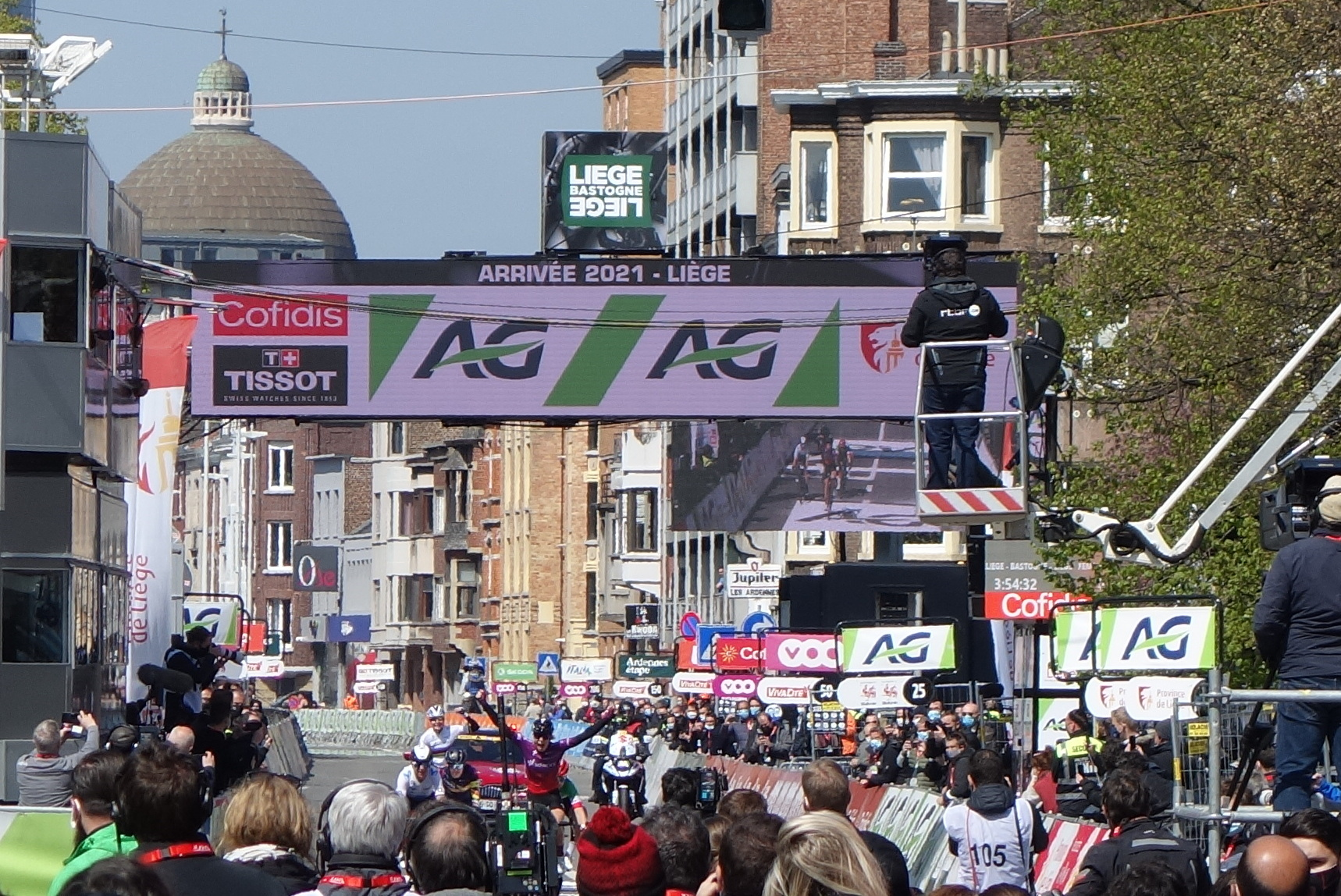
- Vollering wins the sprint in Liège

Race details
- Dates: 25 April 2021
- Distance: 141 km (88 mi)
- Winning time: 3h 54' 31"

Results
	Winner	Demi Vollering (NED)	(SD Worx)
	Second	Annemiek van Vleuten (NED)	(Movistar Team)
	Third	Elisa Longo Borghini (ITA)	(Trek–Segafredo)

The fifth edition of Liège–Bastogne–Liège Femmes, a road cycling one-day race in Belgium, was held on 25 April 2021. It was the eight event of the 2021 UCI Women's World Tour. The race started in Bastogne and finished in Liège; the route included seven categorised climbs over a total distance of 141 km (88 mi).

== Route ==
Similar to the 2019 and 2020 editions, the race finished in Liège. At 141 km (88 mi), the race was approximately half the distance of the men's event. It started in Bastogne, from where it headed north to finish in Liège on the same location as the men's race. The route featured seven categorised climbs: the Côte de Wanne, Côte de la Haute-Levée, Col de Rosier, Côte de Desnié, Côte de La Redoute, Côte des Forges and Côte de la Roche aux Faucons.

== Teams ==
Nine UCI Women's WorldTeams and fourteen UCI Women's Continental Teams competed in the race.

UCI Women's WorldTeams

- Alé BTC Ljubljana
- Canyon//SRAM
- Liv Racing
- FDJ Nouvelle-Aquitaine Futuroscope
- Team BikeExchange
- Movistar Team
- Team DSM
- Trek–Segafredo
- SD Worx

UCI Women's Continental Teams

- A.R. Monex
- Andy Schleck–CP NVST–Immo Losch
- Arkéa Pro Cycling Team
- Bepink
- Bingoal Casino–Chevalmeire
- Ceratizit–WNT Pro Cycling
- Cogeas–Mettler–Look
- Drops–Le Col
- Team Jumbo–Visma
- Lotto–Soudal Ladies
- Parkhotel Valkenburg
- Rally Cycling
- Tibco–Silicon Valley Bank
- Valcar–Travel & Service

== Results ==
Result
Rank	Rider	Team	Time
1	Demi Vollering (NED)	SD Worx	3h 54' 31"
2	Annemiek van Vleuten (NED)	Movistar Team	+ 0"
3	Elisa Longo Borghini (ITA)	Trek–Segafredo	+ 0"
4	Katarzyna Niewiadoma (POL)	Canyon//SRAM	+ 0"
5	Anna van der Breggen (NED)	SD Worx	+ 2"
6	Marianne Vos (NED)	Team Jumbo–Visma	+ 1' 27"
7	Ashleigh Moolman (RSA)	SD Worx	+ 1' 27"
8	Cecilie Uttrup Ludwig (DEN)	FDJ Nouvelle-Aquitaine Futuroscope	+ 1' 27"
9	Lucinda Brand (NED)	Trek–Segafredo	+ 1' 59"
10	Amanda Spratt (AUS)	Team BikeExchange	+ 1' 59"
