= 2023 Itzulia Women =

Cycling race

2023 UCI Women's World Tour, race 16 of 27

Race details
- Dates: 12–14 May 2023
- Stages: 3
- Distance: 370.2 km (230.0 mi)
- Winning time: 9h 57' 24"

Results
Jersey awarded to the overall winner	Winner	Marlen Reusser (SUI)	(SD Worx)
	Second	Demi Vollering (NED)	(SD Worx)
	Third	Katarzyna Niewiadoma (POL)	(Canyon//SRAM)
Jersey awarded to the points classification winner	Points	Marlen Reusser (SUI)	(SD Worx)
Jersey awarded to the mountains classification winner	Mountains	Demi Vollering (NED)	(SD Worx)
Jersey awarded to the youth classification winner	Youth	Ella Wyllie (NZL)	(Lifeplus Wahoo)
	Team	SD Worx	

The 2023 Itzulia Women was a Spanish women's cycle stage race that was held in the Basque Country from 12 to 14 May 2023. The 2023 edition of the race was the second running of Itzulia Women, being held as part of the 2023 UCI Women's World Tour.

The race was won by Swiss rider Marlen Reusser of SD Worx. The SD Worx team dominated the event, winning 4 of the 5 classifications.

== Route ==
The race uses the hilly landscape of the Basque Country, with seven categorised climbs over the 3 stages, including the famed Jaizkibel climb (7.9 km at 5.6%) used in the Clásica de San Sebastián.

Stage characteristics and winners
Stage	Date	Route	Distance	Type	Winner	Team
1	12 May	Eika-Etxebarria to Markina-Xemein	122.2 km (75.9 mi)	Hilly stage	Demi Vollering (NED)	SD Worx
2	13 May	Vitoria-Gasteiz to Amurrio	133.2 km (82.8 mi)	Hilly stage	Demi Vollering (NED)	SD Worx
3	14 May	San Sebastián to San Sebastián	114.8 km (71.3 mi)	Hilly stage	Marlen Reusser (SUI)	SD Worx
Total			370.2 km (230.0 mi)			

== Summary ==
Prior to the race, the 2023 La Vuelta Femenina was fought between Demi Vollering of SD Worx and Annemiek van Vleuten of Movistar Team. These two riders were therefore considered favourites for the race win.

In the race itself, Demi Vollering won the first stage by 47 seconds after a 12 kilometre attack from the Urkaregi climb. Van Vleuten crashed on the wet roads of the final climb, putting her a minute behind Vollering. On the second stage, Vollering won the final sprint, maintaining her lead. On the final stage, Marlen Reusser of SD Worx used a solo attack to win the stage 2' 38" ahead of Vollering. Reusser therefore took the overall win, with a margin of 1' 50".

Four of the classifications were won by SD Worx, with Reusser also winning the points classification, and Vollering winning the mountains classification. SD Worx also took the team classification. The young rider classification was won by New Zealand rider Ella Wyllie of Lifeplus–Wahoo, winning her first classification at a World Tour event.

SD Worx continued their domination of the UCI Women's World Tour rankings, with four riders in the top six and Vollering keeping the leaders jersey.

== Classification leadership table ==
Classification leadership by stage
Stage	Winner	General classification	Points classification	Mountains classification	Young rider classification	Team classification
1	Demi Vollering	Demi Vollering	Demi Vollering	Demi Vollering	Ella Wyllie	SD Worx
2	Demi Vollering	Demi Vollering	Demi Vollering	Demi Vollering	Ella Wyllie	SD Worx
3	Marlen Reusser	Marlen Reusser	Marlen Reusser	Demi Vollering	Ella Wyllie	SD Worx
Final		Marlen Reusser	Marlen Reusser	Demi Vollering	Ella Wyllie	SD Worx

- On stage 2 & 3, Marlen Reusser, who was second in the points classification, wore the green jersey, because first placed Demi Vollering wore the violet jersey as the leader of the general classification. For the same reason, on stage 2, Niamh Fisher-Black, who was second in the mountains classification, wore the red jersey.

== Result ==
Final general classification
Rank	Rider	Team	Time
1	Marlen Reusser (SUI)	SD Worx	9h 57' 24"
2	Demi Vollering (NED)	SD Worx	+ 1' 50"
3	Katarzyna Niewiadoma (POL)	Canyon//SRAM	+ 2' 59"
4	Olivia Baril (CAN)	UAE Team ADQ	+ 3' 00"
5	Annemiek van Vleuten (NED)	Movistar Team	+ 3' 07"
6	Évita Muzic (FRA)	FDJ–Suez	+ 3' 41"
7	Liane Lippert (GER)	Movistar Team	+ 4' 32"
8	Loes Adegeest (NED)	FDJ–Suez	+ 4' 51"
9	Eva van Agt (NED)	Team Jumbo–Visma	+ 6' 04"
10	Pauliena Rooijakkers (NED)	Canyon//SRAM	+ 6' 33"

== See also ==
- 2023 in women's road cycling
