= 2026 Tour of Flanders (women's race) =

Cycling race

2026 UCI Women's World Tour, race 11 of 26
- Event poster with previous winner Lotte Kopecky

Race details
- Dates: 5 April 2026
- Stages: 1
- Distance: 164.1 km (102.0 mi)
- Winning time: 4h 16' 37"

Results
	Winner	Demi Vollering (NED)	(FDJ United–Suez)
	Second	Pauline Ferrand-Prévot (FRA)	(Visma–Lease a Bike)
	Third	Puck Pieterse (NED)	(Fenix–Premier Tech)

The 2026 Tour of Flanders was a Belgian road cycling one-day race that took place on 5 April. It was the 23rd edition of the Tour of Flanders and the 11th event of the 2026 UCI Women's World Tour. The race was won by Dutch rider Demi Vollering of FDJ United–Suez.

== Teams ==
Fourteen UCI Women's WorldTeams, six UCI Women's ProTeams, and two UCI Women's Continental Teams took part in the race.

UCI Women's WorldTeams

- AG Insurance–Soudal
- Canyon//SRAM Zondacrypto
- EF Education–Oatly
- FDJ United–Suez
- Fenix–Premier Tech
- Human Powered Health
- Lidl–Trek
- Liv AlUla Jayco
- Movistar Team
- Team Picnic–PostNL
- Team SD Worx–Protime
- UAE Team ADQ
- Uno-X Mobility
- Visma–Lease a Bike

UCI Women's ProTeams

- Cofidis
- Laboral Kutxa–Fundación Euskadi
- Lotto–Intermarché Ladies
- Mayenne Monbana My Pie
- St. Michel–Preference Home–Auber93
- VolkerWessels Cycling Team

UCI Women's Continental Teams

- Citymesh–Customm Pro Cycling Team
- Minimax Cycling Team

== Result ==
Result
Rank	Rider	Team	Time
1	Demi Vollering (NED)	FDJ United–Suez	4h 16' 37"
2	Pauline Ferrand-Prévot (FRA)	Visma–Lease a Bike	+ 42"
3	Puck Pieterse (NED)	Fenix–Premier Tech	+ 42"
4	Lotte Kopecky (BEL)	Team SD Worx–Protime	+ 1' 04"
5	Zoe Bäckstedt (GBR)	Canyon//SRAM Zondacrypto	+ 1' 04"
6	Karlijn Swinkels (NED)	UAE Team ADQ	+ 1' 04"
7	Silvia Persico (ITA)	UAE Team ADQ	+ 1' 07"
8	Elisa Longo Borghini (ITA)	UAE Team ADQ	+ 1' 07"
9	Mischa Bredewold (NED)	Team SD Worx–Protime	+ 1' 58"
10	Franziska Koch (GER)	FDJ United–Suez	+ 1' 58"
