= 2026 La Flèche Wallonne Femmes =

Cycling race

2026 UCI Women's World Tour, race 14 of 26
- Event poster

Race details
- Dates: 22 April 2026
- Stages: 1
- Distance: 148.2 km (92.1 mi)
- Winning time: 3h 53' 27"

Results
	Winner	Demi Vollering (NED)	(FDJ United–Suez)
	Second	Puck Pieterse (NED)	(Fenix–Premier Tech)
	Third	Paula Blasi (ESP)	(UAE Team ADQ)

The 2026 La Flèche Wallonne Femmes was a road cycling one-day race that took place on 22 April 2026 from the Belgian city of Huy. It was the 29th edition of La Flèche Wallonne Femmes and the 14th event of the 2026 UCI Women's World Tour.

The race was won by Dutch rider Demi Vollering of FDJ United–Suez for the second time, after her previous victory in 2023.

== Course ==
The longest edition of the race featured a 148.2 kilometres (92.1 mi) course starting and finishing in Huy, with the finish line on the top of the final ascent of the Mur de Huy. The final half of the course was two laps of a circuit (identical to the men's race), taking the ascents of Ereffe, Cherave and Huy twice.

The race featured 9 categorised climbs:

- 10.5 km: Côte de Bohissau – 2.2 km climb at 5.5%
- 38.3 km: Côte de Courrière – 1.4 km climb at 7%
- 49.1 km: Côte de Durnal – 2.3 km climb at 4.6%
- 92.6 km: Côte d'Ereffe – 2.1 km climb at 5%
- 105.3 km: Côte de Cherave – 1.3 km climb at 8.1%
- 111 km: Mur de Huy – 1.3 km climb at 9.6%
- 129.8 km: Côte d'Ereffe – 2.1 km climb at 5%
- 142.5 km: Côte de Cherave – 1.3 km climb at 8.1%
- 148.2 km: Mur de Huy – 1.3 km climb at 9.6%

== Teams ==
Twenty-four teams took part in the race.

UCI Women's WorldTeams

- AG Insurance–Soudal
- Canyon//SRAM Zondacrypto
- EF Education–Oatly
- FDJ United–Suez
- Fenix–Premier Tech
- Human Powered Health
- Lidl–Trek
- Liv AlUla Jayco
- Movistar Team
- Team Picnic–PostNL
- Team SD Worx–Protime
- UAE Team ADQ
- Uno-X Mobility
- Visma–Lease a Bike

UCI Women's ProTeams

- Cofidis
- Laboral Kutxa–Fundación Euskadi
- Lotto–Intermarché Ladies
- Ma Petite Entreprise
- Mayenne Monbana My Pie
- St. Michel–Preference Home–Auber93
- VolkerWessels Cycling Team

== Result ==
Result
Rank	Rider	Team	Time
1	Demi Vollering (NED)	FDJ United–Suez	3h 53' 27"
2	Puck Pieterse (NED)	Fenix–Premier Tech	+ 0"
3	Paula Blasi (ESP)	UAE Team ADQ	+ 3"
4	Katarzyna Niewiadoma-Phinney (POL)	Canyon//SRAM Zondacrypto	+ 6"
5	Anna van der Breggen (NED)	Team SD Worx–Protime	+ 11"
6	Magdeleine Vallieres (CAN)	EF Education–Oatly	+ 14"
7	Pauline Ferrand-Prévot (FRA)	Visma–Lease a Bike	+ 28"
8	Niamh Fisher-Black (NZL)	Lidl–Trek	+ 34"
9	Isabella Holmgren (CAN)	Lidl–Trek	+ 40"
10	Nienke Vinke (NED)	Team SD Worx–Protime	+ 40"
