= Red jersey =

The red jersey is a cycling jersey, given to the leader of several classifications.

== Red jersey as general classification leader ==
Since 2010, the leader of the general classification in the Vuelta a España and La Vuelta Femenina wears a red jersey.

== Red jersey as points classification leader ==
In 1968, the leader of the points classification in the Tour de France wore a red jersey. In 1967, 1968 and from 2010 to 2016, the leader of the points classification in the Giro d'Italia wore a red jersey.

== Red jersey as mountains classification leader ==
The red jersey also signifies the mountains classification leader and winner for several stage races, including:

- Paris–Nice
- Tour of Missouri
- Volta a Catalunya
- Tour de Romandie
- Tour of the Basque Country
- Tour of Ireland
- Tour of California (since 2009)

== Red jersey as most aggressive rider ==
The red jersey also signifies the Most Aggressive Rider or Most Combative classification for several stage races including:

- Tour of California (from 2006 until 2008)
- Tour of Missouri
- Tour du Faso

== Others ==
- Between 1984 and 1989, the red jersey was given to the leader of the Intermediate sprints classification in the Tour de France.
