= Côte de La Redoute =

Hill climb Belgium

Coordinates: 50°29′26″N 5°42′19″E

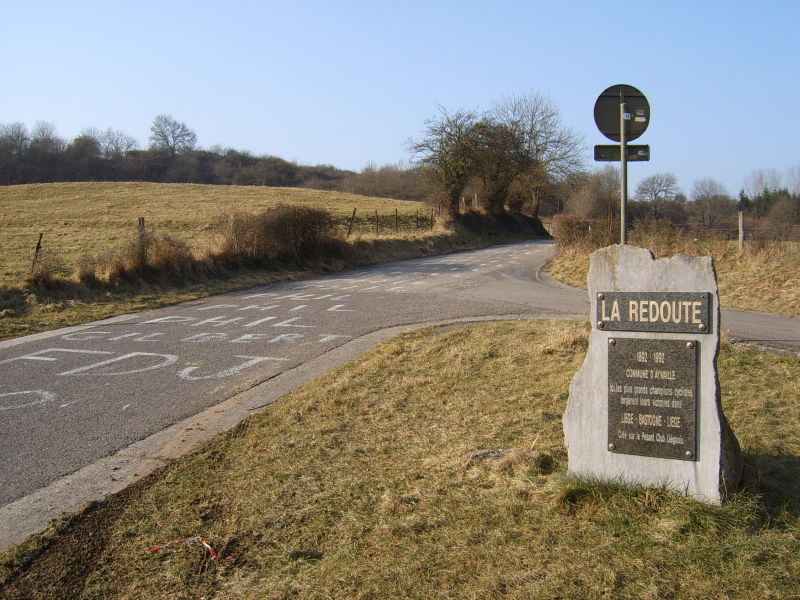
- Lower slopes of the climb of La Redoute
- Location: Wallonia; Belgium
- Start: Remouchamps, Aywaille
- Gain in altitude: 161 m (528 ft)
- Length of climb: 1.65 km (1.03 mi)
- Maximum elevation: 292 m (958 ft)
- Average gradient: 9.5 %
- Maximum gradient: 22 %

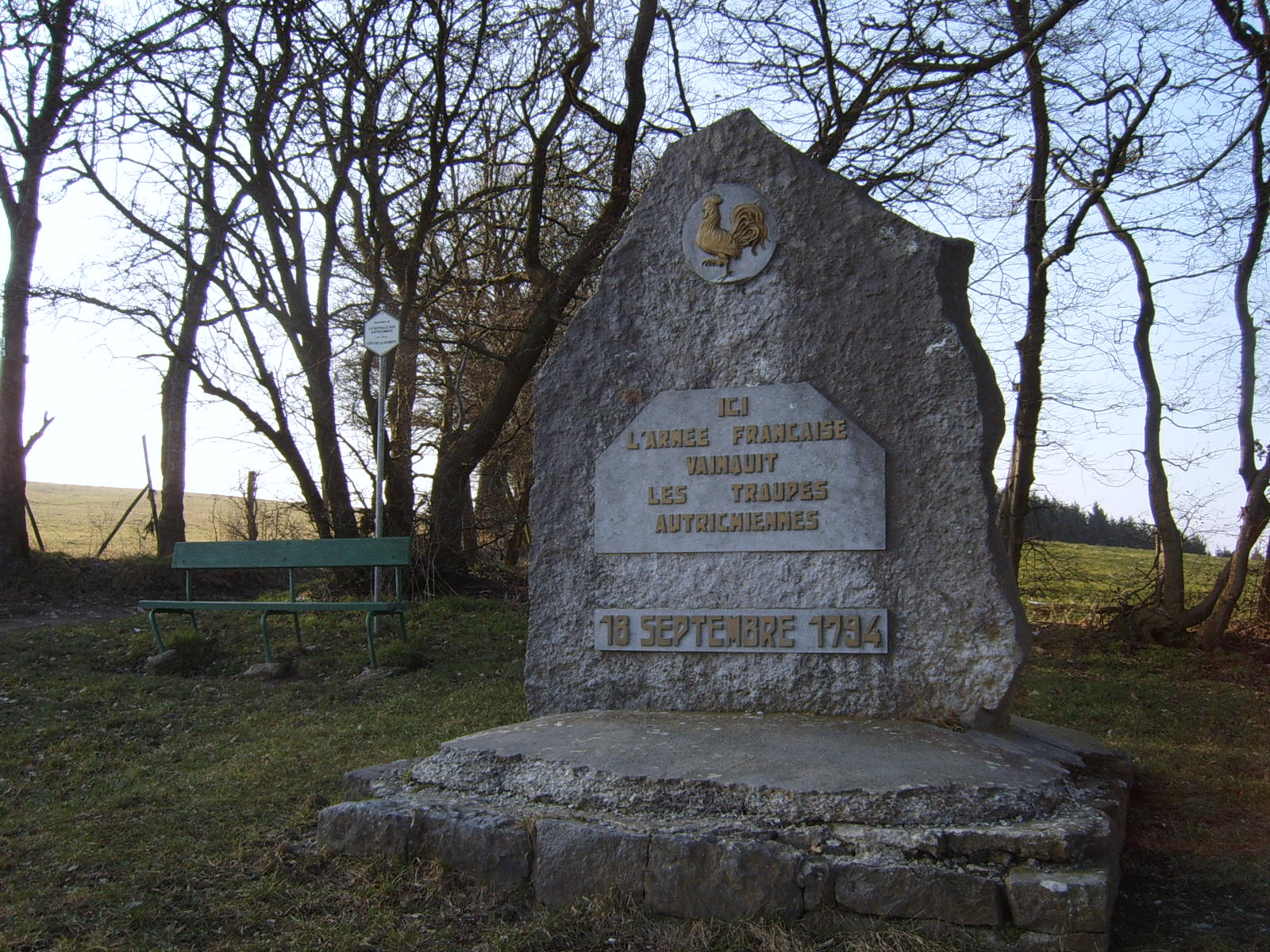
Monument at the top in memory of the French-Austrian War of 1792

The Côte de La Redoute is a climb, often included in the Liège–Bastogne–Liège cycle route. It is located in Wallonia in the municipality of Aywaille and its incline is 1.6 km long with an average of 9.5%. It is named after a redoubt in the battle of Sprimont, which occurred at the village of Fontin, which is located on it, in the municipality of Esneux. It also runs along an access route to autoroute E25 level with the town of Remouchamps. The region is the birthplace of cyclist Philippe Gilbert.
