= 2017 La Course by Le Tour de France =

2017 UCI Women's World Tour (stage 1 only), race 13 of 20
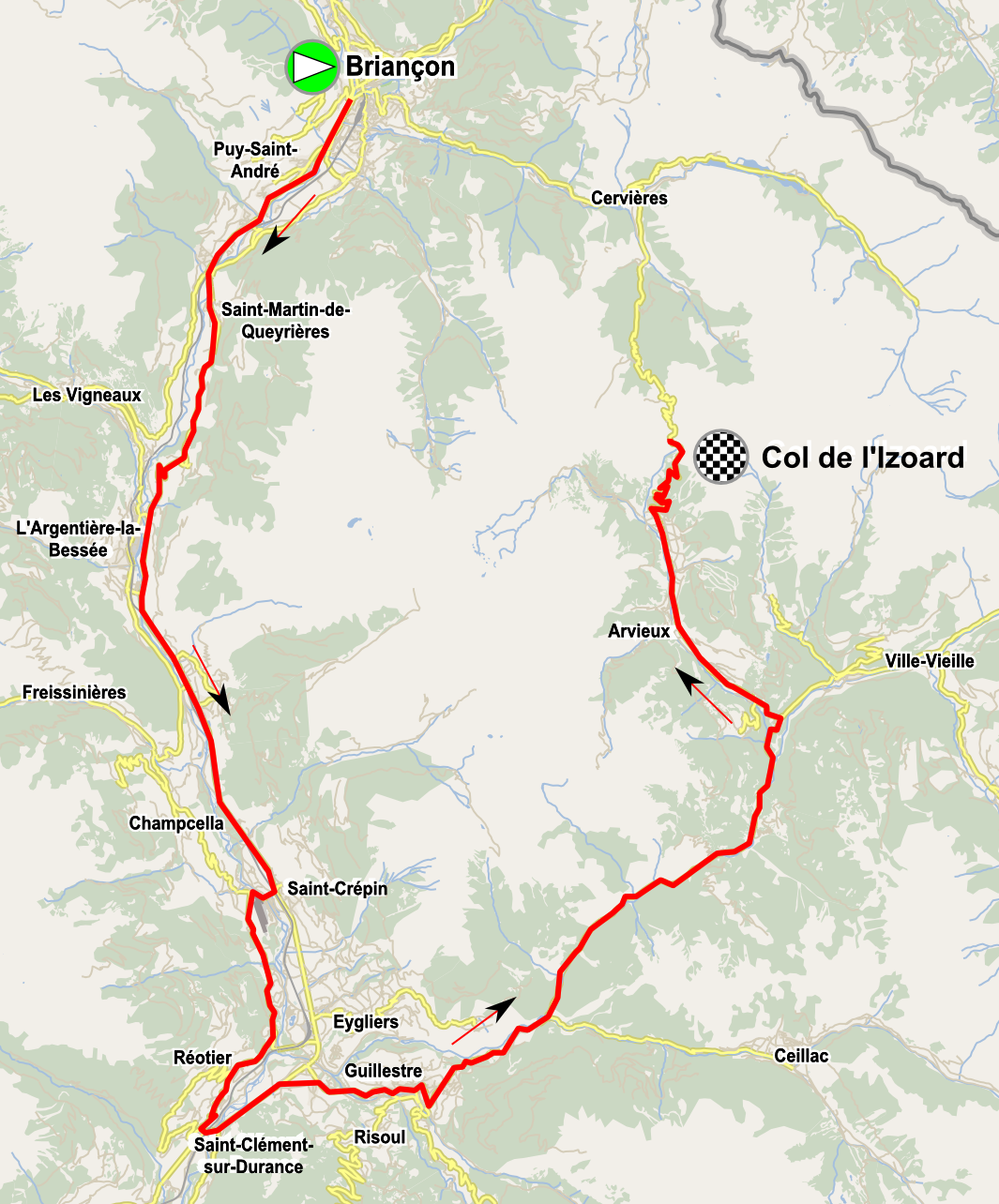

Race details
- Dates: 20 and 22 July 2017
- Stages: 2 (UCI World Tour: 1)
- Distance: 90 km (56 mi)
- Winning time: 2h 40' 10"

Results
	Winner	Annemiek van Vleuten (NED)	(Orica–Scott)
	Second	Lizzie Deignan (GBR)	(Boels–Dolmans)
	Third	Elisa Longo Borghini (ITA)	(Wiggle High5)

The 2017 La Course by Le Tour de France with FDJ was the fourth edition of La Course by Le Tour de France, a women's cycle race held in France. The race was held before stage 18 of the 2017 Tour de France, between Briançon and the Col d'Izoard, on 20 July, and was followed by a pursuit race before stage 20 of the Tour de France. It was organised by the ASO. The first day counted also as the thirteenth race of the 2017 UCI Women's World Tour.

Both races had the same podium; Annemiek van Vleuten (Orica–Scott) won both races ahead of Boels–Dolmans rider Lizzie Deignan, with the podium being completed each time by Wiggle High5's Elisa Longo Borghini.

The event was subsequently criticised, with issues regarding the 'pursuit' format, facilities for riders & teams and the desire for a 'Women's Tour de France'.

== Route and format ==
Following criticism by riders regarding the lack of progress towards a multi stage race, ASO announced in October 2016 that the race would remain a one-day event but move from the Champs-Élysées in Paris to a mountain stage on the Col d'Izoard.

It was then announced that the race would take place over two days. The top twenty finishers on the first day, or those within five minutes of the stage winner on the Col d'Izoard, were eligible to contest a second 22.5-kilometre (14.0 mi) stage, over the same course as the men's time trial in Marseille on 22 July. However, for the purposes of the UCI Women's World Tour, only the results from the first day counted. The pursuit stage was held as a 1.15 categorised event, on the French Cycling Federation (FFC) calendar – and therefore did not count towards the UCI Women's World Tour – with riders starting at their respective time gaps from the Col d'Izoard.

Stage characteristics and winners
Stage	Date	Course	Distance	Type	Winner
1	20 July	Briançon to Col d'Izoard	67.5 km (42 mi)	Mountain stage	Annemiek van Vleuten (NED)
2	22 July	Marseille to Marseille	22.5 km (14 mi)	Pursuit stage	Annemiek van Vleuten (NED)
For the purposes of the UCI Women's World Tour only the results from the first day counted.

== Teams ==
21 teams participated in the 2017 La Course by Le Tour de France. The top 15 UCI Women's World Tour teams were automatically invited, and obliged to attend the race.

UCI Women's Teams

- Alé–Cipollini
- Astana
- Bepink–Cogeas
- Boels–Dolmans
- BTC City Ljubljana
- Canyon//SRAM
- Cervélo–Bigla Pro Cycling
- Cylance Pro Cycling
- FDJ Nouvelle-Aquitaine Futuroscope
- Team Hitec Products
- Lares–Waowdeals
- Lensworld–Kuota
- Lotto–Soudal Ladies
- Orica–Scott
- Servetto Giusta
- Team Sunweb
- Tibco–Silicon Valley Bank
- Wiggle High5
- WM3 Energie
- Team VéloCONCEPT

National teams

- France

== Results ==
=== La Course by Le Tour de France - stage 1 ===
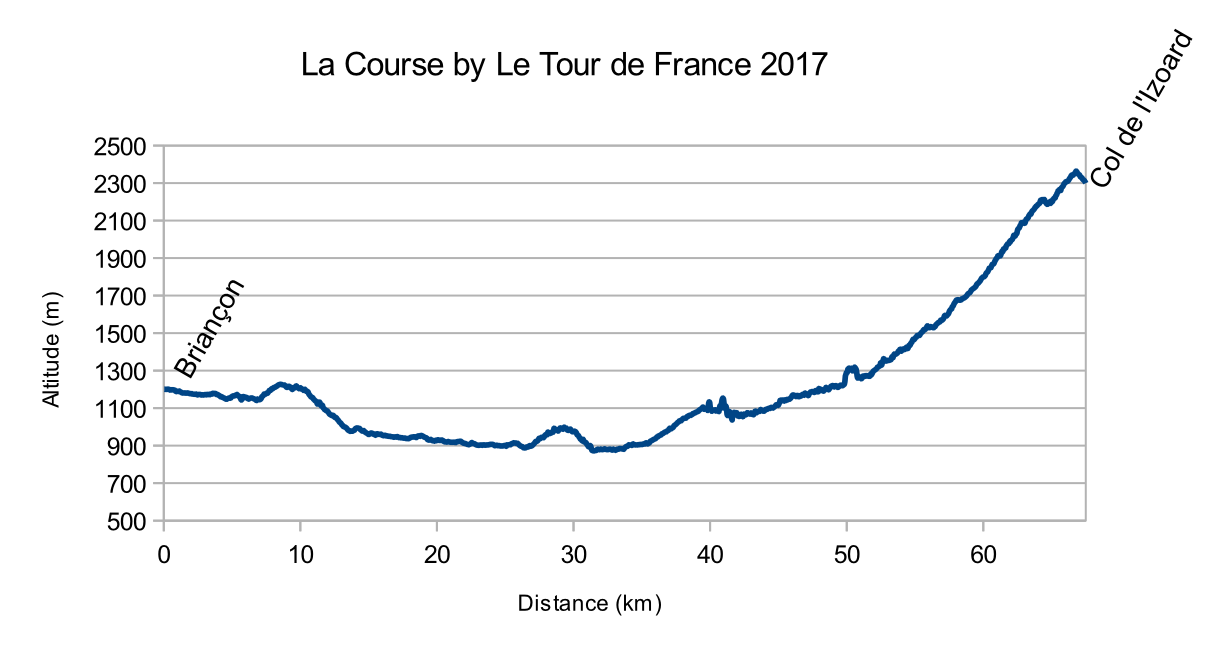
The profile of La Course by Le Tour de France - stage 1

20 July 2017 — Briançon to Col d'Izoard, 67.5 km (41.9 mi)

Of the 119 riders to start the race, 47 completed the race within the time limit. 19 riders qualified for La Course Poursuite, as they finished within five minutes of race winner Annemiek van Vleuten.

Result
Rank	Rider	Team	Time
1	Annemiek van Vleuten (NED)	Orica–Scott	2h 07' 18"
2	Lizzie Deignan (GBR)	Boels–Dolmans	+ 43"
3	Elisa Longo Borghini (ITA)	Wiggle High5	+ 1' 23"
4	Megan Guarnier (USA)	Boels–Dolmans	+ 1' 28"
5	Shara Gillow (AUS)	FDJ Nouvelle-Aquitaine Futuroscope	+ 1' 33"
6	Amanda Spratt (AUS)	Orica–Scott	+ 1' 41"
7	Lauren Stephens (USA)	Tibco–Silicon Valley Bank	+ 1' 51"
8	Ana Sanabria (COL)	Servetto Giusta	+ 2' 24"
9	Katarzyna Niewiadoma (POL)	WM3 Energie	+ 2' 52"
10	Hanna Nilsson (SWE)	BTC City Ljubljana	+ 3' 04"

=== La Course Poursuite - stage 2 ===
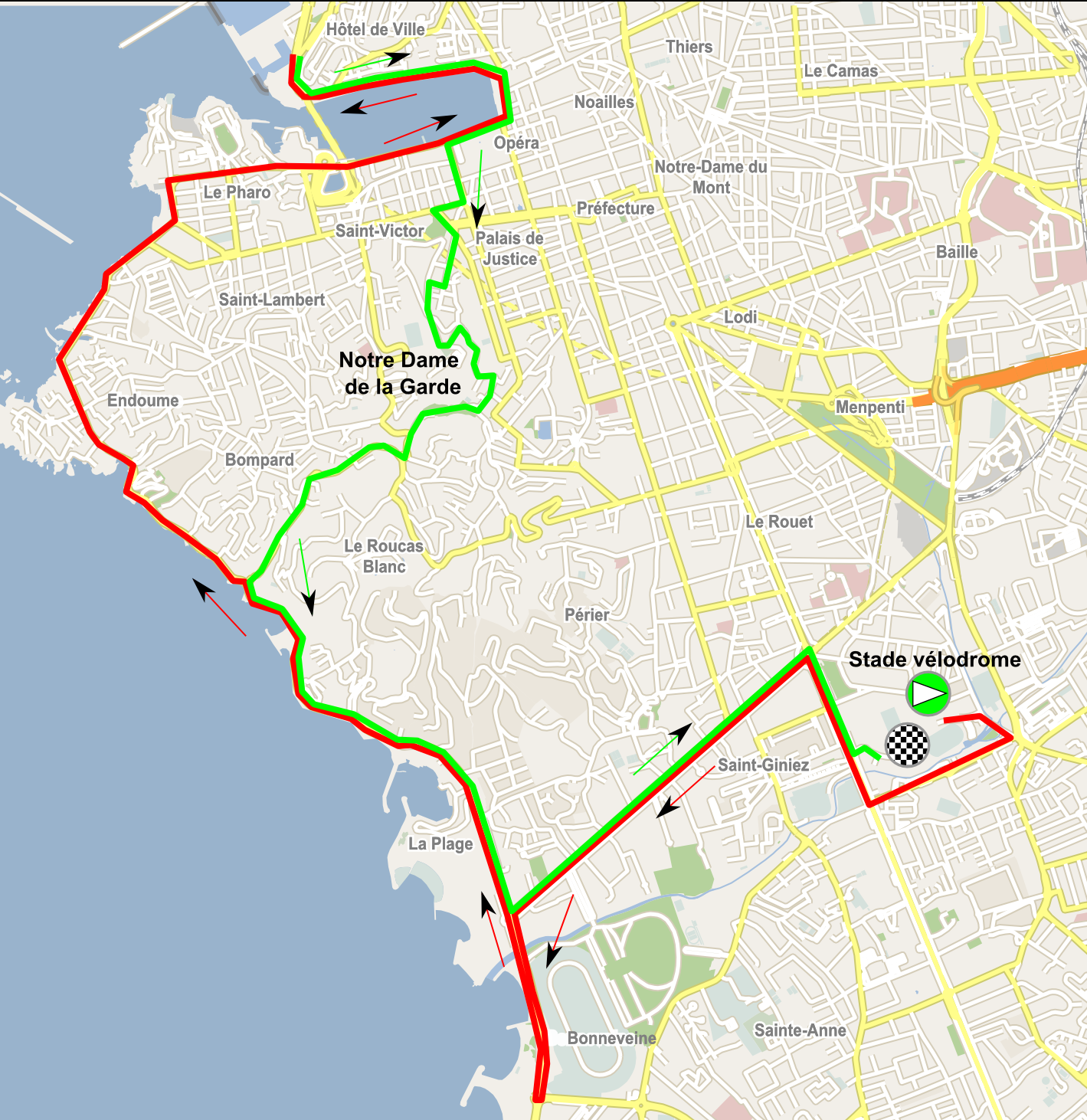
The route of La Course Poursuite - stage 2

22 July 2017 — Marseille to Marseille, 22.5 km (14.0 mi)

Result
Rank	Rider	Team	Time
1	Annemiek van Vleuten (NED)	Orica–Scott	32' 52"
2	Lizzie Deignan (GBR)	Boels–Dolmans	+ 1' 52"
3	Elisa Longo Borghini (ITA)	Wiggle High5	+ 1' 52"
4	Megan Guarnier (USA)	Boels–Dolmans	+ 3' 00"
5	Amanda Spratt (AUS)	Orica–Scott	+ 3' 26"
6	Shara Gillow (AUS)	FDJ Nouvelle-Aquitaine Futuroscope	+ 3' 48"
7	Lauren Stephens (USA)	Tibco–Silicon Valley Bank	+ 3' 53"
8	Katarzyna Niewiadoma (POL)	WM3 Energie	+ 4' 35"
9	Ashleigh Moolman (RSA)	Cervélo–Bigla Pro Cycling	+ 4' 35"
10	Ana Sanabria (COL)	Servetto Giusta	+ 4' 46"

== Criticism ==
Following the event, the race was criticised by the professional peloton and teams.

As only 20 riders qualified for the individual pursuit stage, teams were unable to plan logistics to get riders, equipment and team staff to Marseille. Lizzie Deignan subsequently noted that it took 9 hours to get off the mountain and to Marseille, with no police escort offered by organisers. The format of a 'pursuit' stage was thought not to be a success, as the mountain stage resulting in large time gaps that riders could not make up. Riders also criticised the facilities available in Marseille, with a lack of female toilets. The absence of TV coverage on the screens in the Stade Vélodrome where thee stage started and finished was also criticised.

Teams and riders also criticised the move away from Paris, noting the attraction of the stage for sponsors. Campaigner Kathryn Bertine stated her disappointment that the race had not evolved into a multi day stage race, with former cyclist & commentator Joanna Rowsell stating that "We need mountain climbs, flat stages, time trials and a Champs-Elysees finish".

The 2018 event reverted to a single day event, albeit remaining a mountain stage. In 2022, Tour de France Femmes held its first edition, to praise from the professional peloton, teams and media.

== See also ==
- 2017 in women's road cycling
