= 2027 Tour de France Femmes =

Women's cycling race

2027 UCI Women's World Tour, race 21 of 25

Race details
- Dates: 30 July – 7 August
- Stages: 9
- Distance: 1,156 km (718 mi)

The 2027 Tour de France Femmes (officially Tour de France Femmes avec Zwift) will be the sixth edition of the Tour de France Femmes. The race will take place from 30 July to 7 August 2027, part of the 2027 UCI Women's World Tour. The race will be organised by the Amaury Sport Organisation (ASO), which also organises the men's Tour de France.

== Route and stages ==
In March 2025, it was announced that the 2027 editions of the Tour de France and Tour de France Femmes would have a Grand Départ in the United Kingdom, marking the first time that both the men's and women's races have started in the same nation outside France. In January 2026, more details were announced: the race would start in Leeds, with the first three stages all in the United Kingdom. Prior to the route announcement, there were rumours that the race would visit the La Loge des Gardes ski station (previously used in Paris–Nice) and a summit finish on the Puy de Dôme.

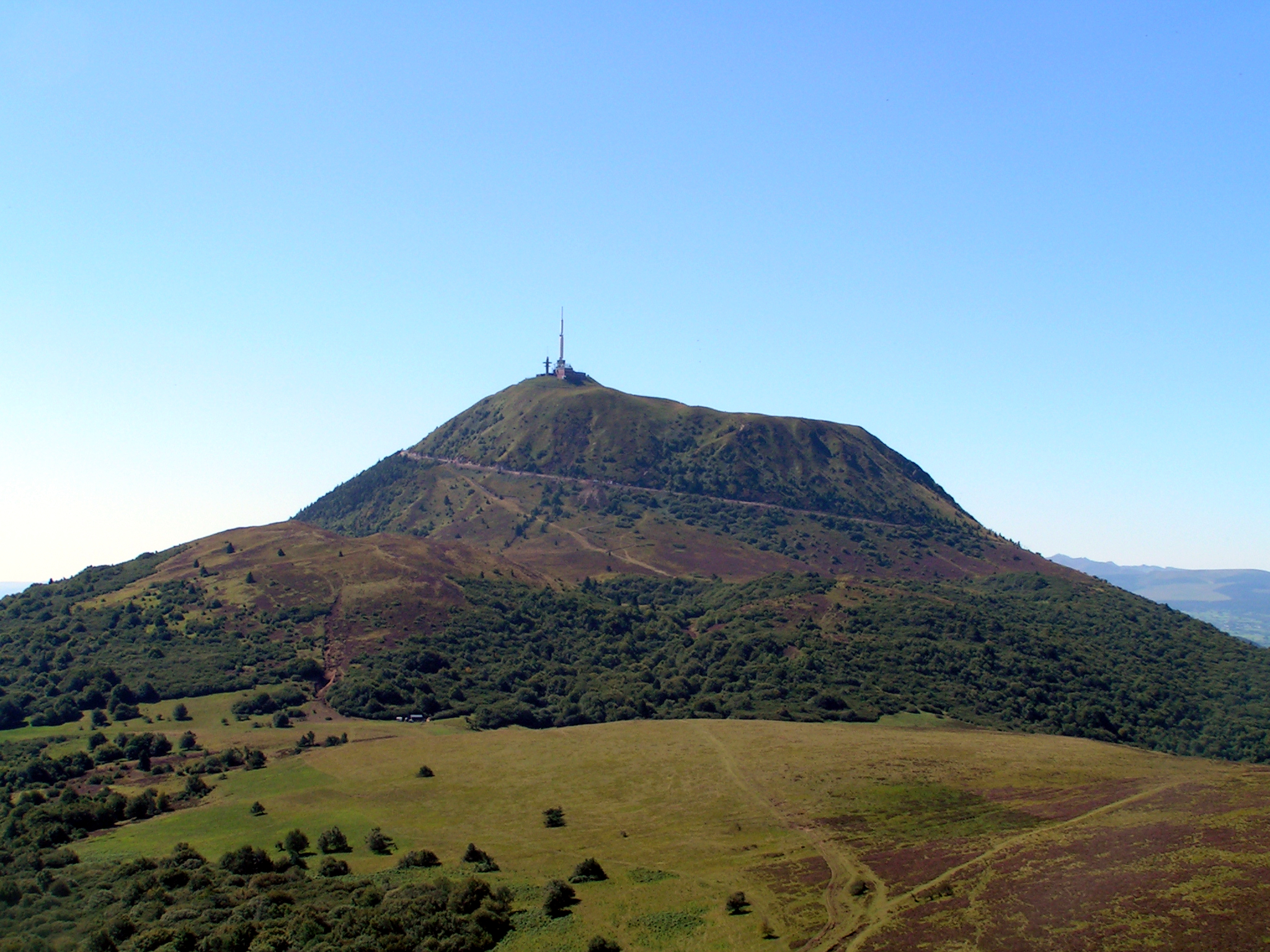
On stage 9, the Tour will have a summit finish at Puy de Dôme at an elevation of 1,465 m (4,806 ft).

In October 2026, the full route was announced by race director Marion Rousse. The route has nine days of racing with nine stages, covering a total of 1,156 km (718 mi) with 17,665 metres (57,956 ft) of elevation gain. The first three stages will take place in the United Kingdom, with a flat stage to Manchester, a hilly stage in the Pennines to Sheffield and a team time trial in London. The route then crosses the English Channel, heading south with 4 stages across northern and central France. The final two stages take place in the Massif Central around Clermont-Ferrand, with the longest stage of the race culminating with a summit finish at Puy de Dôme at an elevation of 1,465 m (4,806 ft).

Reacting to the route, Cycling News called the route "super tough", where "practically every day could invoke GC action". Cycling News was disappointed by the lack of stages in the French Alps or Pyrenees, or an individual time trial – while acknowledging that the race length means that it cannot "go everywhere and do everything". Rouleur also noted the lack of high mountains, considering that the race was for the "puncheuses". L'Équipe stated that the stage to Sheffield was "similar to a mini Liège–Bastogne–Liège" with over 2,800 metres (9,200 ft) of elevation gain. Velo called the Puy de Dôme "one of the Tour de France’s most storied climbs" and that it would deliver a "spectacular final showdown". Cycling Weekly noted that a lack of fans on Puy de Dôme could lead to "an anticlimax" on the final stage. Lizzy Banks on the The Cycling Podcast Féminin agreed, calling it a "massive error" not to finish the race in a "big city like Clermont-Ferrand". Banks expressed disappointment that the race didn't grow in length given the race starts on a Friday, stating that it was "literally the perfect moment and [ASO] didn't take it".

Rousse described the route as "explosive" and that the route was a "classic almost every day [...] nine days of racing without any downtime".

Stage characteristics
Stage	Date	Course	Distance	Type	Winner
1	1 August	Leeds to Manchester (United Kingdom)	86 km (53 mi)	Flat stage	
2	2 August	Manchester to Sheffield (United Kingdom)	154 km (96 mi)	Hilly stage	
3	3 August	London (United Kingdom)	18 km (11 mi)	Team time trial	
4	4 August	Le Touquet-Paris-Plage to Calais	123 km (76 mi)	Flat stage	
5	5 August	Neufchâtel-en-Bray to Magnanville	161 km (100 mi)	Flat stage	
6	6 August	Orléans to Bourges	138 km (86 mi)	Flat stage	
7	7 August	Nevers to La Loge des Gardes	155 km (96 mi)	Hilly stage	
8	8 August	La Bourboule to Clermont-Ferrand	151 km (94 mi)	Mountain stage	
9	9 August	Clermont-Ferrand to Puy de Dôme	170 km (110 mi)	Mountain stage	
Total			1,156 km (718 mi)		
