= La Course by Le Tour de France =

Former cycling one-day race

- Logo of La Course by Le Tour de France

Race details
- Date: July
- Region: France
- Nickname: La Course
- Discipline: Road
- Competition: UCI Women's World Tour
- Organiser: Amaury Sport Organisation
- Race director: Christian Prudhomme
- Web site: www.lacoursebyletourdefrance.com/en/

History
- First edition: 2014
- Editions: 8 (as of 2021)
- Final edition: 2021
- First winner: Marianne Vos (NED)
- Most wins: Annemiek van Vleuten (NED); Marianne Vos (NED) (2 each)
- Final winner: Demi Vollering (NED)

La Course by Le Tour de France was an elite women's professional road bicycle race held in France. First held in 2014 as a one-day race on the Champs-Élysées in Paris, it was part of the UCI Women's WorldTour since 2016 as a one or two day race. The race was organised by the Amaury Sport Organisation (ASO), the organisers of the Tour de France. It was replaced from 2022 onwards by Tour de France Femmes, a multi day stage race organised by ASO.

== History ==
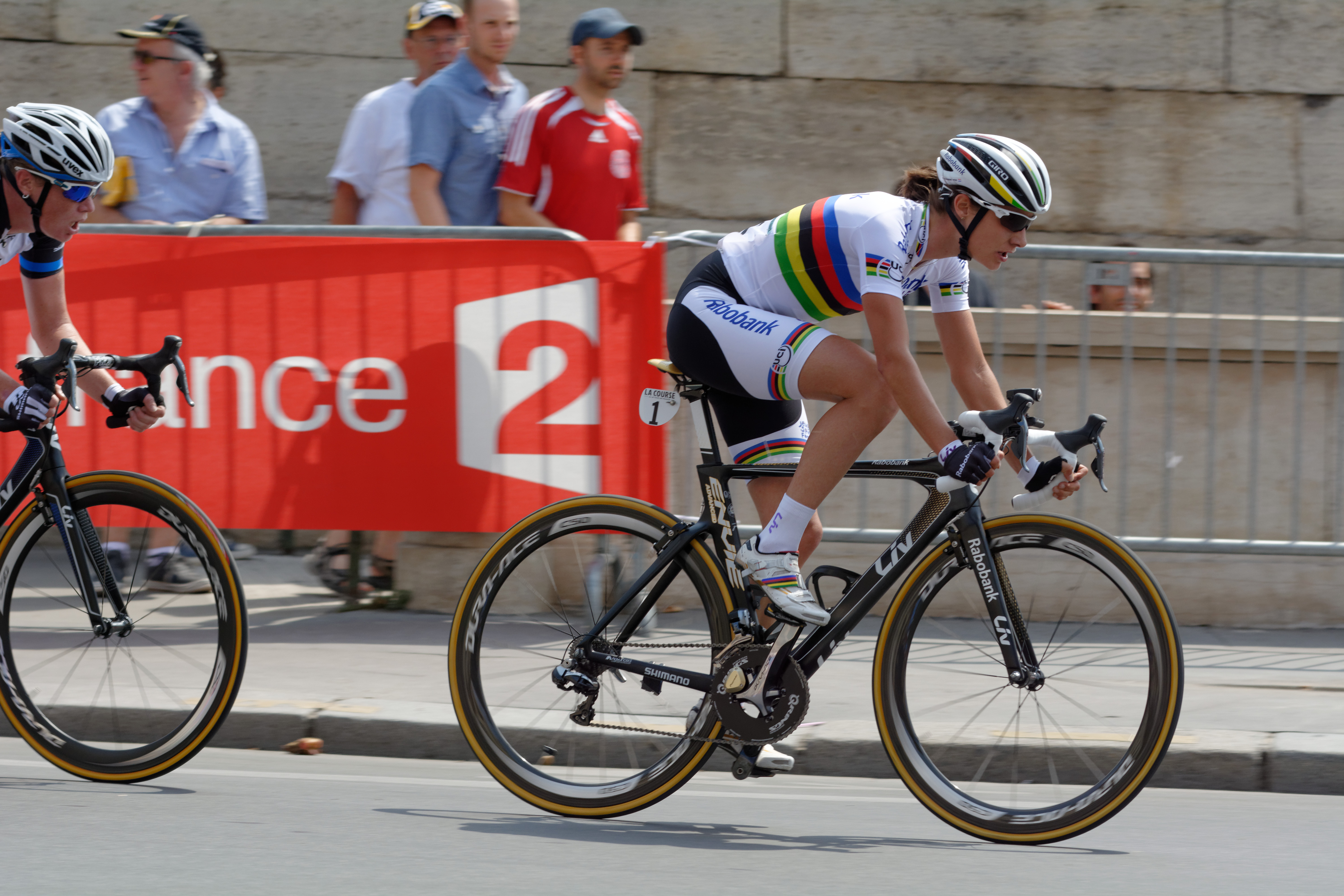
Marianne Vos, winner of the first edition of La Course in 2014

In 2013, professional cyclists Kathryn Bertine, Marianne Vos and Emma Pooley and professional triathlete Chrissie Wellington formed an activist group called Le Tour Entier (“the whole tour”), to petition ASO to launch a women's Tour de France.

Following substantial media coverage, and a petition signed by over 100,000 people, ASO launched La Course by Tour de France in 2014. The race would be held in conjunction with the Tour de France, with the first edition taking place as a one-day race on the Champs-Élysées in advance of the final stage of the men's race. The race was welcomed by the professional peloton and the media, with Vos stating that the race would be a "fantastic showcase after last year's [World Championships] and the 2012 Olympics".

In subsequent years, the race took place in a variety of locations such as Pau, Col de la Colombière and Col d'Izoard in conjunction with the men's race, as the ASO argued that this was the "best way to shine a light on female cycling". The race was initially praised for the exposure gained by 'sharing the stage' with the Tour de France, with sponsors welcoming the visibility of the Champs-Élysées, and live TV coverage in conjunction with the Tour de France.

=== Criticism ===
However, the races were criticised by riders, teams and the media. Some felt that the race was an 'after thought' and were overshadowed by the men's race. ASO were criticised for not doing enough to promote the race. The 2017 edition was specifically criticised for a lack of facilities for riders and teams, no support to get from the Col d'Izoard to Marseille, as well as issues regarding the pursuit time trial format in Marseille. Riders noted that the stages weren't hard enough for the professional peloton, with former cyclist & commentator Joanna Rowsell stating that "We need mountain climbs, flat stages, time trials and a Champs-Elysees finish".

The race was also criticised for not being a "full Tour de France", with campaigner Kathryn Bertine stating her disappointment that the race had not evolved into a multi day stage race. Pushing back on criticism, ASO stated that logistical issues mean that a men's and women's Tour de France would not be able to be staged simultaneously, and that any race must be financially sustainable.

=== Replacement by Tour de France Femmes ===
In June 2021, ASO announced that the Tour de France Femmes – a multi day stage race – would take place for the first time in 2022. This new 8 day race took place following the Tour de France, replacing La Course. The Tour de France Femmes has been highly praised by the public, media, teams and riders – with large crowds and high TV viewership.

== Locations ==
Start and Finish
- 2014-2016 Champs-Élysées, Paris – Champs-Élysées, Paris
- 2017 Briançon – Col d'Izoard and Marseille
- 2018 Lake Annecy – Le Grand-Bornand
- 2019 Pau – Pau
- 2020 Nice – Nice
- 2021 Brest – Landerneau

== Winners ==
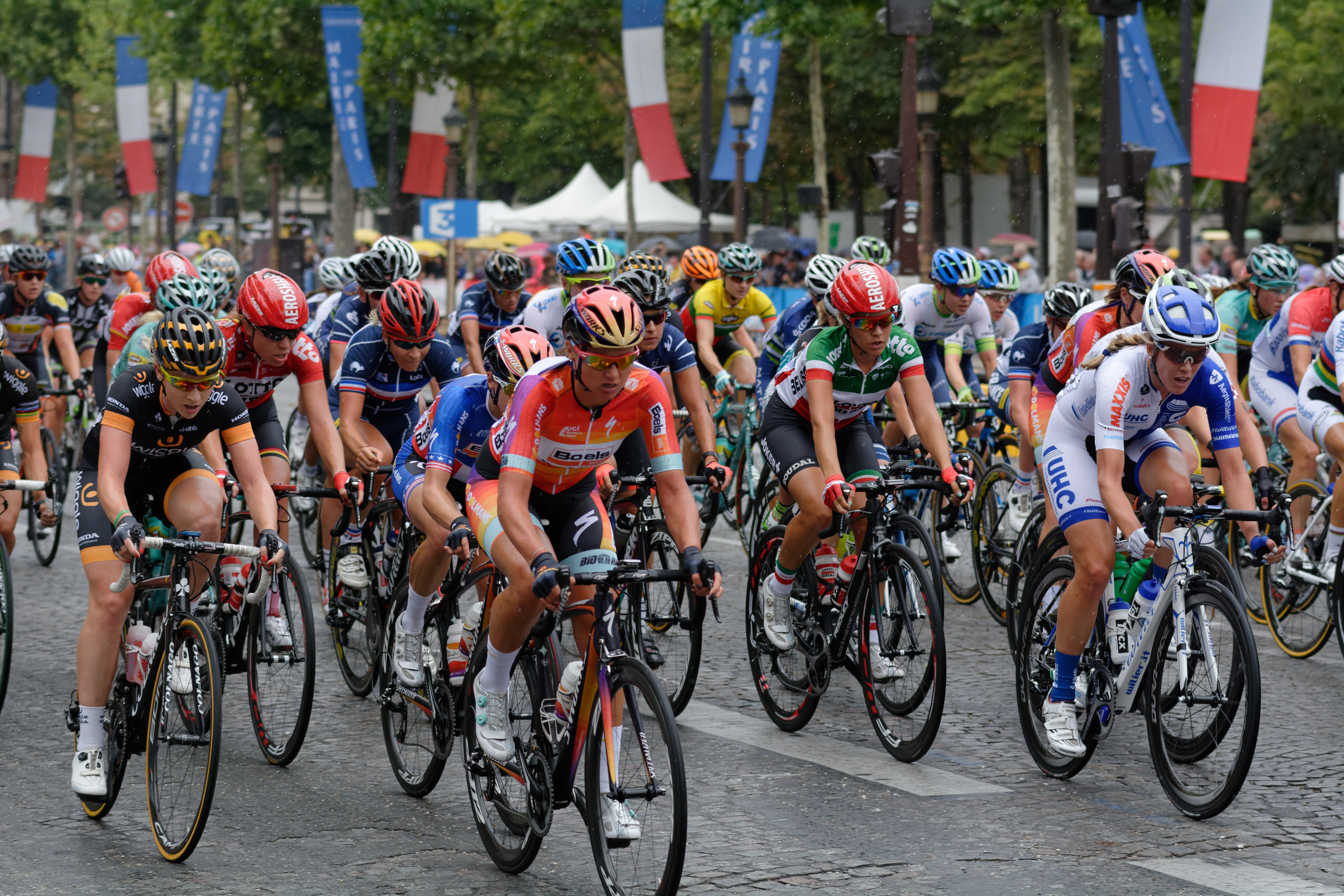
Riders on the Champs-Élysées during the 2015 edition of the race

Year	Country	Rider	Team
2014	Netherlands	Marianne Vos	Rabobank-Liv Woman Cycling Team
2015	Netherlands	Anna van der Breggen	Rabobank-Liv Woman Cycling Team
2016	Australia	Chloe Hosking	Wiggle High5
2017 (Note: Although a pursuit race also scheduled according to the organisation as stage 2, the race results in the UCI database were constituted from the result on the Col d'Izoard. Whether using the terminology of the organisation or the UCI, the winner was the same.)	Netherlands	Annemiek van Vleuten	Orica–Scott
2018	Netherlands	Annemiek van Vleuten	Mitchelton–Scott
2019	Netherlands	Marianne Vos	CCC - Liv
2020	Great Britain	Lizzie Deignan	Trek–Segafredo
2021	Netherlands	Demi Vollering	SD Worx

A total of six of the eight editions were won by cyclists from the Netherlands.
