= The Cyclists' Alliance =

Professional cyclist labor organization

TCA
- The Cyclists' Alliance
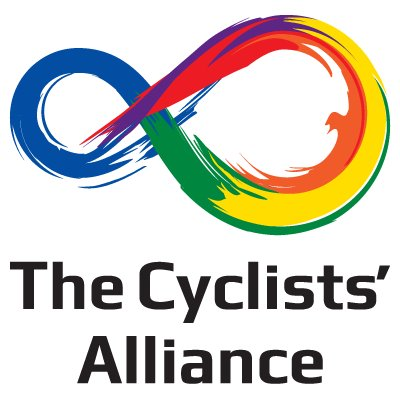
- Founded: 2017; 9 years ago
- Headquarters: Ouderkerk aan de Amstel
- Location: Netherlands
- Key people: Iris Slappendel, Executive Director; Rhian Ravenscroft, Vice Director; Gracie Elvin, Communications Director
- Affiliations: UCI
- Website: cyclistsalliance.org

The Cyclists' Alliance or TCA is the labor organization representing professional cyclists in UCI Women's World Tour (UCIWWT) events. The organisation, which operates out of Ouderkerk aan de Amstel, is led by Executive Director Iris Slappendel.

== Details ==
Founded in December 2017, TCA act as an intermediary between members and the businesses that employ them. The main purpose of the organization is to provide formal representations and give riders the power to negotiate for more favourable working conditions.

In addition to conducting labor negotiations, TCA represents and protects the rights of the athletes; the organization's actions include filing grievances on behalf of athletes. The union is also negotiating for the introduction of a collective bargaining agreement as is available for male cyclists. The union will ensure these commitments are adhered to by the UCI and the teams. It negotiates and monitors retirement and insurance benefits and enhances and defends the image of athletes and their profession.

== History ==
Female professional athletes have been waging a battle for equality in nearly every major sport. In the 21st century, activists have produced watershed wins, such as equal prize money for major tennis events. In contrast, cycling had made little progress prior to 2017. Previous activist work for better women's cycling had occurred, with groups like Le Tour Entier calling for the creation of a women's Tour de France.

The UCI's 18-member management committee includes only two women and reflects the widespread institutional sexism in cycling culture.

The Cyclists' Alliance as an idea came from the recently retired Iris Slappendel following some of her own experiences as a rider and a UCI representative. In February 2017, Slappendel had spoken to the men's cycling union, the Cyclistes Professionnels Associés (CPA), about ways in which they could support women's cycling. The men's association dismissed Slappendel, asserting that CPA did not consider women to be professional.

Slappendel then met with two professional cyclists, Gracie Elvin of Mitchelton–Scott and Carmen Small of Team Virtu Cycling Women, and the group surveyed 450 professional cyclists racing in UCI Women's World Tour events. This survey affirmed that an association of women's professional cyclists would be an important catalyst to push women's teams, the UCI, and race organizers, to work toward greater economic and career opportunities for women. The labor association, The Cyclists’ Alliance was subsequently formed in December 2017.

== Leadership ==
The current executive director of TCA is Iris Slappendel. As of 2018, the rider council consists of the following current athletes: Ashleigh Moolman-Pasio, Amanda Spratt, Leah Kirchman, Ellen van Dijk, Marianne Vos, Audrey Cordon, Christine Majerus, and Ariane Lüthi (MTB).

Position	Name	Year(s)
Executive
Executive Director	Iris Slappendel	September, 2017 –
Vice Director	Rhian Ravenscroft	September, 2019 –
Communications Director	Gracie Elvin (temporarily replaced TBA)	September, 2017 –
Treasurer	Roos Hoogeboom	September, 2019 –
Rider Representative	Ashleigh Moolman-Pasio	September, 2019 –
Board
Gender Rights Advisor	Kristen Worley	
Legal advisor	Eric Vilé	
UCI Athletes Commission Women's Road Representative	Marianne Vos	
Business Consultant	Joe Harris	
Advisor Partnerships	Jack Lindsay	
Sporting Union advisors	Uni World Players Association	
Executive Director, World Players Association. Labour & human rights lawyer	Brendan Schwab	
Athletes Rights advisors	Eu Athletes	
President of EU Athletes	Yves Kummer	
Advisor Governance and Strategy	Andrea Marcellini	
TCAMP Mentor Program	Carmen Small	
