= Le Tour Entier =

Activist group calling for a women's Tour de France

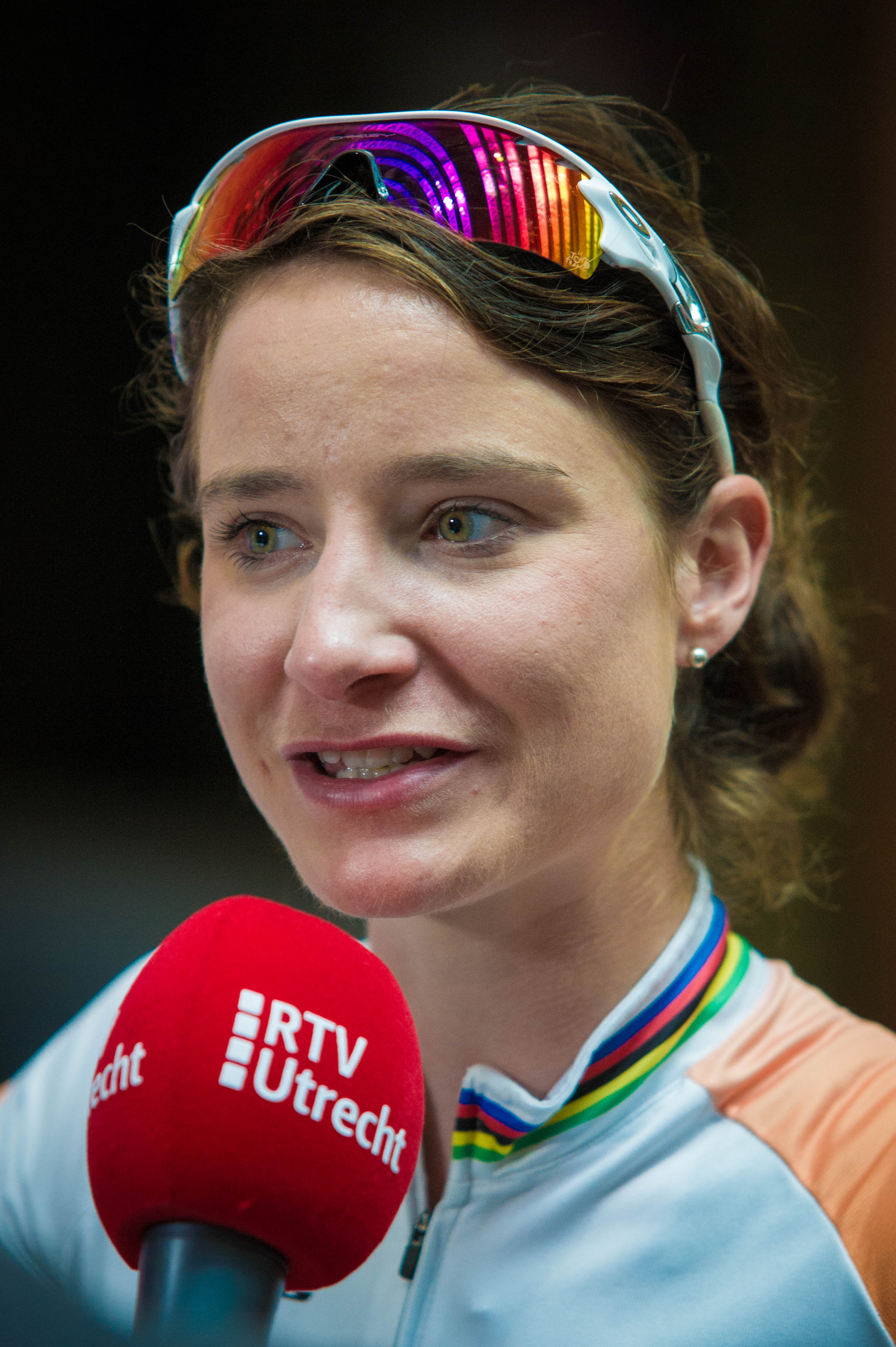
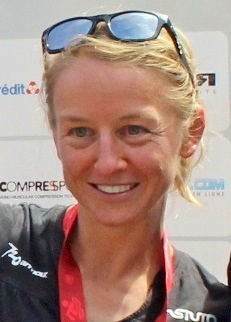
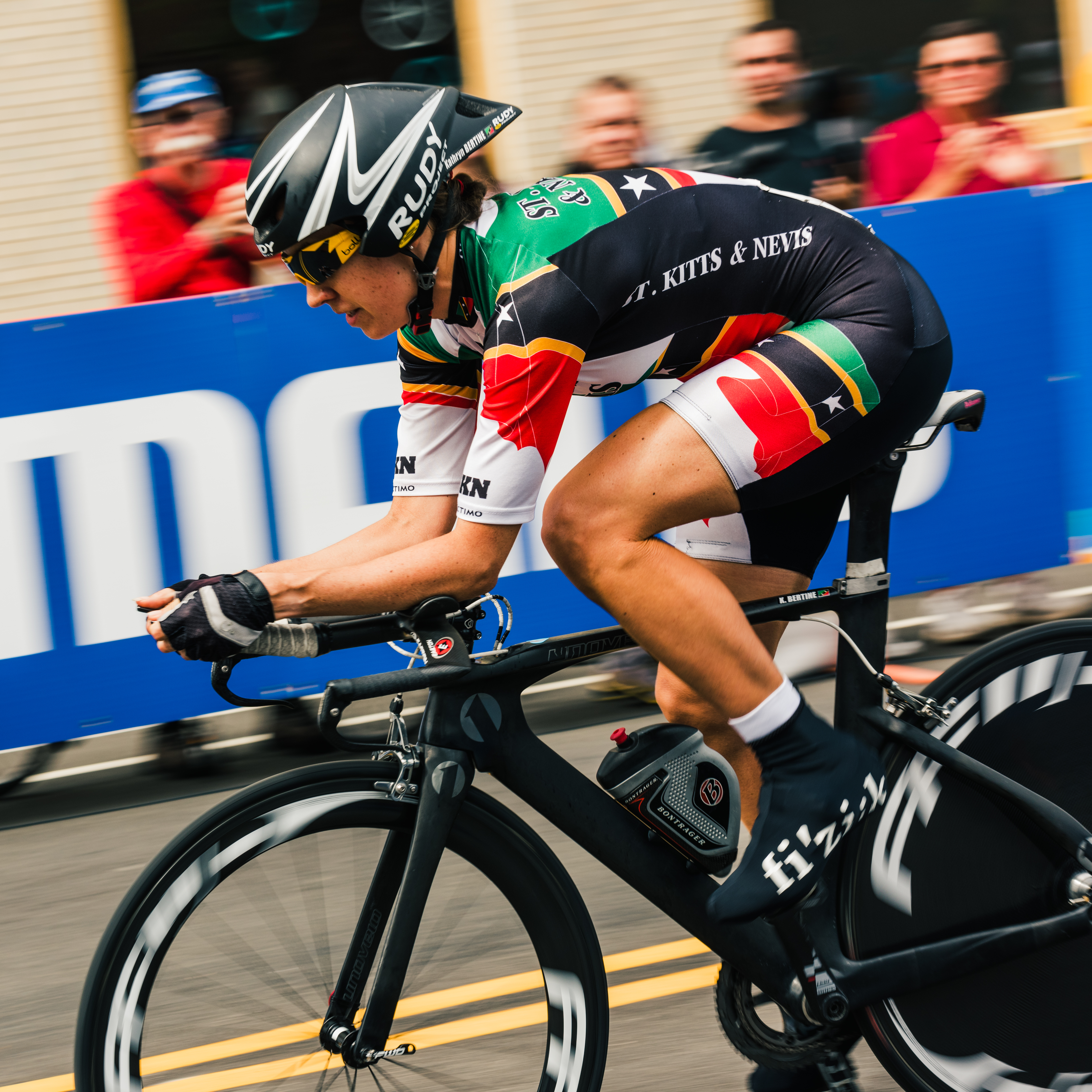
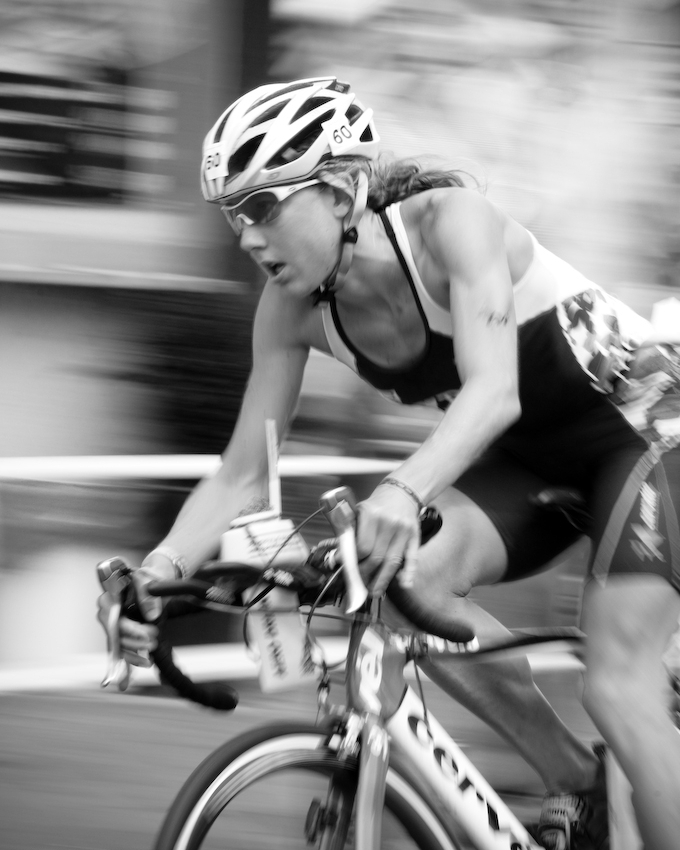
Cyclists Marianne Vos, Emma Pooley & Kathryn Bertine, and triathlete Chrissie Wellington

Le Tour Entier is an activist group to improve women's cycle racing, and call for a women's Tour de France. The group was founded in 2013 by multiple world champion Marianne Vos, Olympic silver medallist Emma Pooley, professional cyclist Kathryn Bertine and multiple world Ironman champion Chrissie Wellington.

== History ==
In 2009, professional cyclist Kathryn Bertine was frustrated why there was no official 'Women's Tour de France'. She wrote to the organisers of the race – Amaury Sport Organisation (ASO) – with a business plan on how such a race could be created. No response was received. Subsequently, Bertine became an activist for women's cycling, and formed the activist group Le Tour Entier (“the whole tour”) with fellow cyclists Marianne Vos and Emma Pooley and triathlete Chrissie Wellington.

They launched a petition in September 2013, calling for a women's Tour de France to be run by Amaury Sport Organisation (ASO), the organisers of the Tour de France. The headline of the petition stated "After a century, it is finally time to allow women to ride their Tour de France as well". The group received substantial media coverage, with over 100,000 signatures received. In October 2013, the group met with ASO to work out how a women's race could be included in the Tour.

A manifesto was published by the group in September 2013, setting out proposed improvements and initiatives to improve women's cycling. This was sent to the governing body of cycling – Union Cycliste Internationale (UCI), as well as to race organisers. The manifesto called for:

- A women's Tour de France to be run alongside the men's race
- Creation of a women's World Tour and other continental tours & championships
- Men's UCI World Tour events should also stage a women's race
- Revision of race and stage length restrictions
- Removal of average age rules for women's UCI teams
- Encouraging UCI WorldTeams to set up female squads
- Greater and improved media coverage of women's cycling
- Greater commercial investment in women's cycling

=== Legacy ===
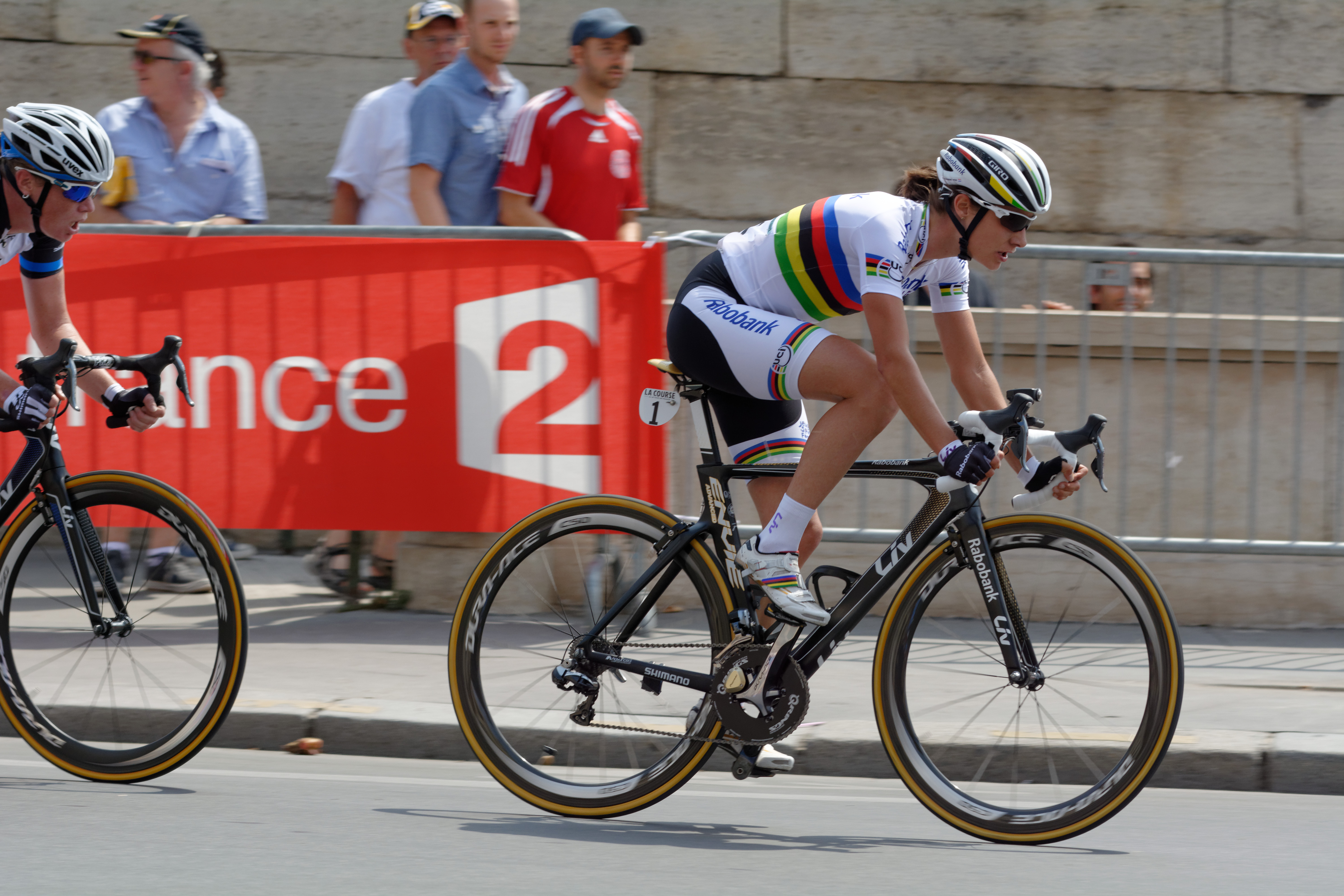
First edition of La Course by Le Tour de France took place in 2014, and was won by Marianne Vos (pictured)

In July 2014, the first edition of La Course by Le Tour de France was staged on the Champs-Élysées in Paris ahead of the final stage of the 2014 Tour de France. Organised by ASO, La Course was welcomed by the professional peloton, media and campaigners, with Le Tour Entier praised for being the "catalyst" behind the push for the race. The race was won by founding member Marianne Vos.

However, La Course did not expand beyond a one day race in subsequent years, and Bertine continued to express disappointment that it had not evolved into a multi day stage race. The professional peloton criticised the lack of difficulty of La Course, with former cyclist & commentator Joanna Rowsell stating that "We need mountain climbs, flat stages, time trials and a Champs-Elysees finish".

Following discussions between the UCI, teams and race organisers, the UCI Women's World Tour was launched in 2016 – with a substantial increase in the number of race days, media coverage and minimum prize money. The World Tour included multi day races, unlike the previous UCI Women's Road World Cup. Several men's UCI World Tour events also now stage a women's race on the same day or weekend – such as Liège–Bastogne–Liège Femmes (first edition in 2017) and Paris–Roubaix Femmes (first edition in 2021).

Several UCI WorldTeams now have female squads, including Movistar (launched 2017), Trek–Segafredo (launched 2018) and Jumbo–Visma (launched 2020). Average age rules for teams were also removed. In 2020, a minimum wage for riders was introduced, with some riders stating their income has doubled or even tripled. UCI has the objective to have equal minimum salaries for both men and women by 2023.

In 2021, ASO announced that the Tour de France Femmes would be held over 8 days in July 2022. The announcement was met with praise by the media, peloton and campaigners. Bertine did caution that the women's race would be significantly shorter than the men's race, with less prize money and TV coverage. The first edition of the race took place in July 2022, to praise from the public, media, teams and riders. The race was met with large crowds and high TV viewership.

Activism in the professional peloton continues, with The Cyclists' Alliance (a union representing the female peloton) pushing for greater live TV coverage, greater prize money and longer races.
