= Tour de France Femmes =

Cycling stage race

- 2027 Tour de France Femmes

Race details
- Date: July
- Region: France
- Local name: Tour de France Femmes (in French)
- Nickname(s): La Grande Boucle, Le Tour Femmes
- Discipline: Road
- Competition: UCI Women's World Tour
- Type: Stage race
- Organiser: Amaury Sport Organization
- Race director: Marion Rousse
- Web site: www.letourfemmes.fr/en/

History
- First edition: 24 July 2022; 4 years ago (Note: Since 1955, various professional women's cycle stage races across France have historically been held as a corresponding event to the Tour de France for women. The Tour de France Femmes does not succeed these historic races, with ASO stating that the 2022 race is the "1st edition" of Tour de France Femmes)
- Editions: 5 (as of 2026)
- First winner: Annemiek van Vleuten (NED)
- Most wins: Demi Vollering (NED) (2 times)
- Most recent: Demi Vollering (NED)

The Tour de France Femmes (French pronunciation: [tuʁ də fʁɑ̃s fam]) is an annual women's cycle stage race around France. It is organised by Amaury Sport Organization (ASO), which also runs the Tour de France. It is part of the UCI Women's World Tour.

Some teams and media have referred to the race as a 'Grand Tour', as it is one of the biggest and longest events on the women's calendar. However, the race does not meet the UCI definition of such an event.

After a one off event in 1955, a corresponding race to the Tour de France for women was held under different names between 1984 and 2009. Over the years, these races struggled with financial difficulties, limited media coverage, sexism, and trademark issues with the organisers of the Tour de France. Following criticism by campaigners and the professional women's peloton, a one/two day race (La Course by Le Tour de France) was held between 2014 and 2021, and Tour de France Femmes staged its first edition in 2022.

The race takes place in July and August after the men's tour, with the 2022–2024 editions of the race featuring eight stages.

All stages are timed to the finish; the riders' times are compounded with their previous stage times. The rider with the lowest cumulative finishing times is the leader of the race and wears the yellow jersey (maillot jaune). While the general classification garners the most attention, there are other contests held within the Tour: the points classification for the sprinters, the mountains classification for the climbers, young rider classification for riders under the age of 23, and the team classification, based on the first three finishers from each team on each stage. Achieving a stage win also provides prestige, often accomplished by a team's sprint specialist or a rider taking part in a breakaway.

== Historic French races ==
Various professional women's cycle stage races across France have been held as corresponding events to the Tour de France for women, with the first of these races staged as a one off in 1955. From 1984, a women's Tour de France was staged consistently, although the name of the event changed several times – such as Tour de France Féminin, Tour of the EEC Women, Tour Cycliste Féminin and Grande Boucle Féminine Internationale. French rider Jeannie Longo won the 1987, 1988 and 1989 editions of the race, gaining fame in the process.

Over the years, these races struggled with financial difficulties, limited media coverage, sexism and trademark issues with the organisers Amaury Sport Organisation (the organisers of the Tour de France). The last of these races took place in 2009, with Emma Pooley joking that the race was "more of a Petite Boucle than Grande."

=== La Course by Le Tour de France ===
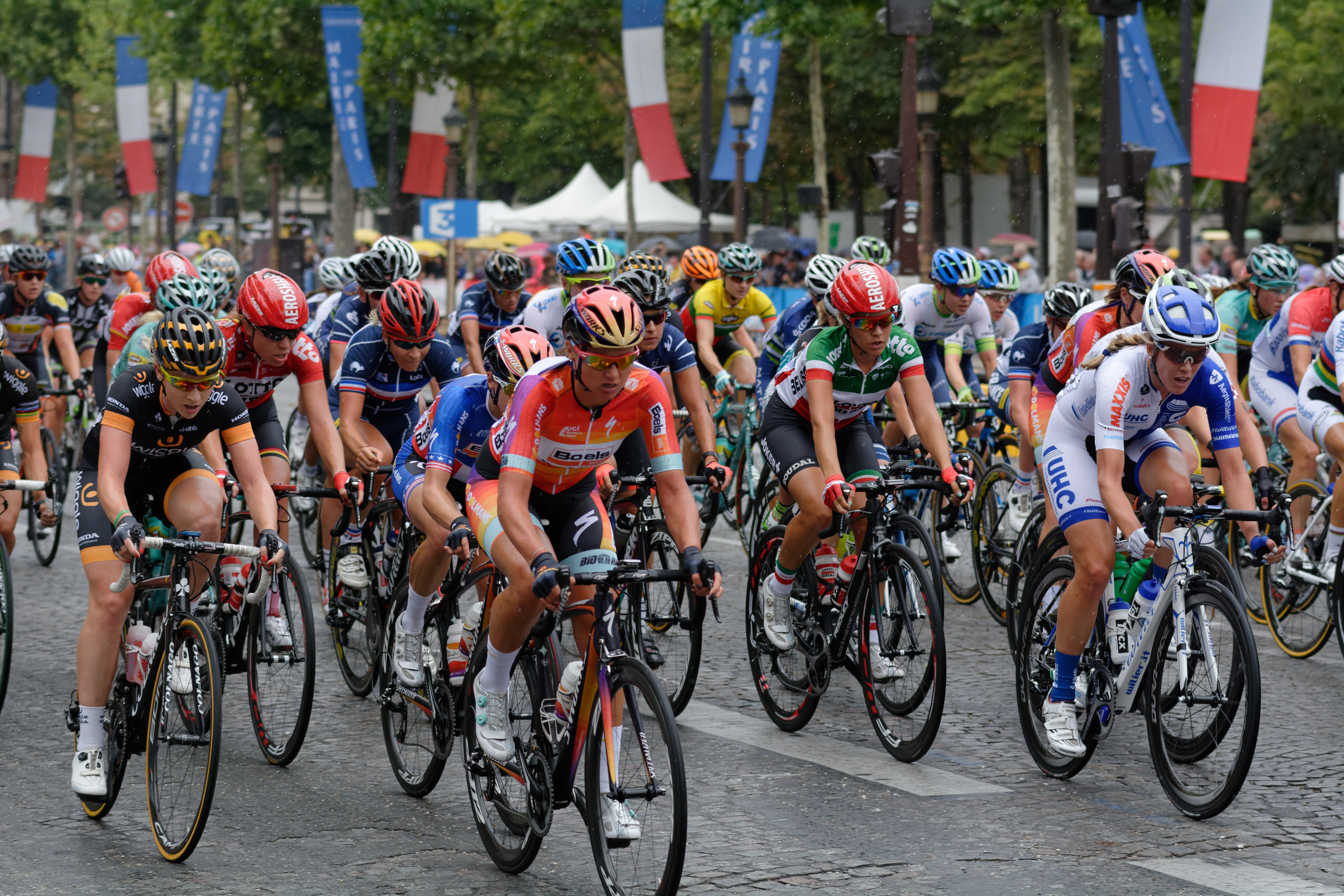
Riders on the Champs-Élysées during the 2015 La Course by Le Tour de France

In 2013, professional cyclists Kathryn Bertine, Marianne Vos and Emma Pooley and professional triathlete Chrissie Wellington formed an activist group called Le Tour Entier (“the whole tour”), to petition ASO to launch a women's Tour de France.

Following substantial media coverage, and a petition signed by over 100,000 people, ASO launched La Course by Tour de France in 2014. This race would be held in conjunction with the Tour de France, with the first edition taking place as a one-day race on the Champs-Élysées in advance of the final stage of the men's race. In subsequent years, the race took place in a variety of locations such as Pau, Col de la Colombière and Col d'Izoard in conjunction with the men's race, as the ASO argued that this was the "best way to shine a light on female cycling".

The race was initially praised for the exposure gained by 'sharing the stage' with the Tour de France, however La Course was criticised for not being a "full Tour de France", being overshadowed by the men's race and not having a challenging enough parcours. ASO were also criticised for not doing enough to promote the race, as well as not providing facilities for the women's peloton at the 2017 edition.

Pushing back on criticism, ASO stated that logistical issues mean that a men's and women's Tour de France would not be able to be staged simultaneously, and that any race must be financially sustainable.

== Tour de France Femmes ==
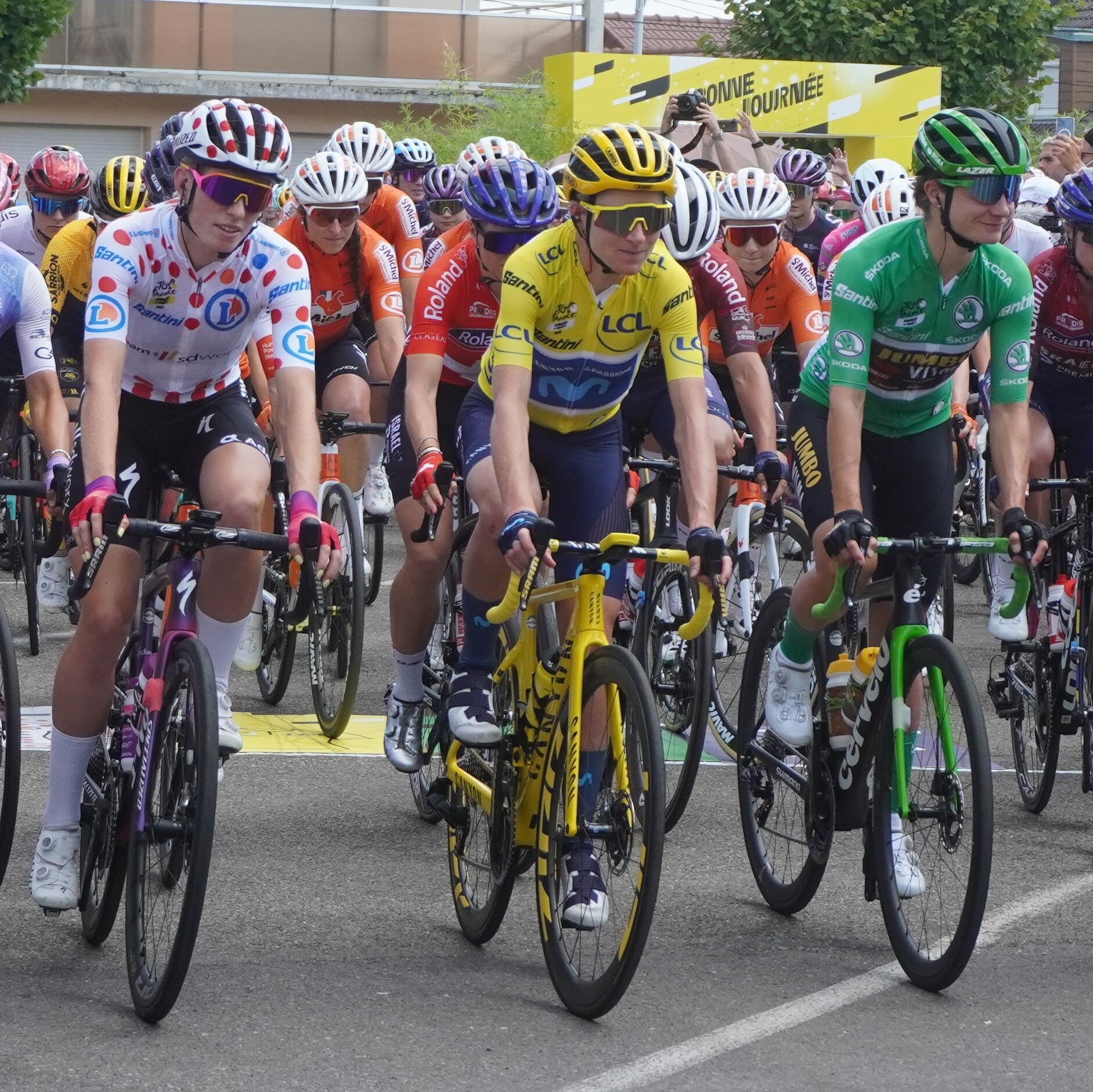
Demi Vollering (left), Annemiek van Vleuten (centre) and Marianne Vos (right) at the 2022 Tour de France Femmes

In June 2021, ASO announced that they would launch a new women's stage race, Tour de France Femmes. The first edition would take place over eight days, following the men’s 2022 Tour de France in July of that year. ASO also announced that Zwift would sponsor the race, with live television coverage provided by France Télévisions in conjunction with the European Broadcasting Union. The men's tour director, Christian Prudhomme stated that lessons must be learned from the failure of previous events like the Grande Boucle Féminine Internationale, and the goal of ASO is to have a financially sustainable event, one "that will still exist in 100 years".

The reaction to the launch of the event from the professional women's peloton was overwhelmingly positive, with Anna van der Breggen stating that it has "long been a dream for many of us to compete in a women's Tour de France" and Cecilie Uttrup Ludwig stating that "this is a day that we’ve waited for, for a long time".

The race has identical classifications to the Tour de France, with the yellow jersey for the general classification, the green jersey for the points classification, the polka dot jersey for the mountains classification, and the white jersey for the young rider (under 23) classification. The jerseys are made by Santini. Main sponsor Zwift have stated that the success of the women's 'virtual Tour de France' during the COVID-19 pandemic encouraged them to commit to sponsoring the race, with other major Tour de France sponsors like LCL, E.Leclerc and Škoda also supporting the event. The race has a prize fund of €250,000, making it the richest race in women's cycling. A report commissioned by Zwift stated that the race has "the biggest audience in women’s professional cycling".

=== Inaugural edition ===
The route of the 2022 edition was announced in October 2021 by race director Marion Rousse. The race started in Paris, with a stage finishing the Champs-Élysées on the morning of the final day of the men's race. The 8 day race culminated in a summit finish at La Planche des Belles Filles.

The first edition of the race took place in July 2022, with Annemiek van Vleuten winning the week long race by nearly 4 minutes, despite suffering from a stomach bug in the early stages of the race. Marianne Vos took the green jersey of the points classification and Demi Vollering took the polka dot jersey of the mountain classification, as well as finishing second overall. The race was highly praised by the public, media, teams and riders – with large crowds and high TV viewership. As the first official women's Tour de France since 1989, the race enjoyed substantial media coverage around the world. Race director Marion Rousse did note that there was room for improvement in future editions, and in women's cycling more generally.

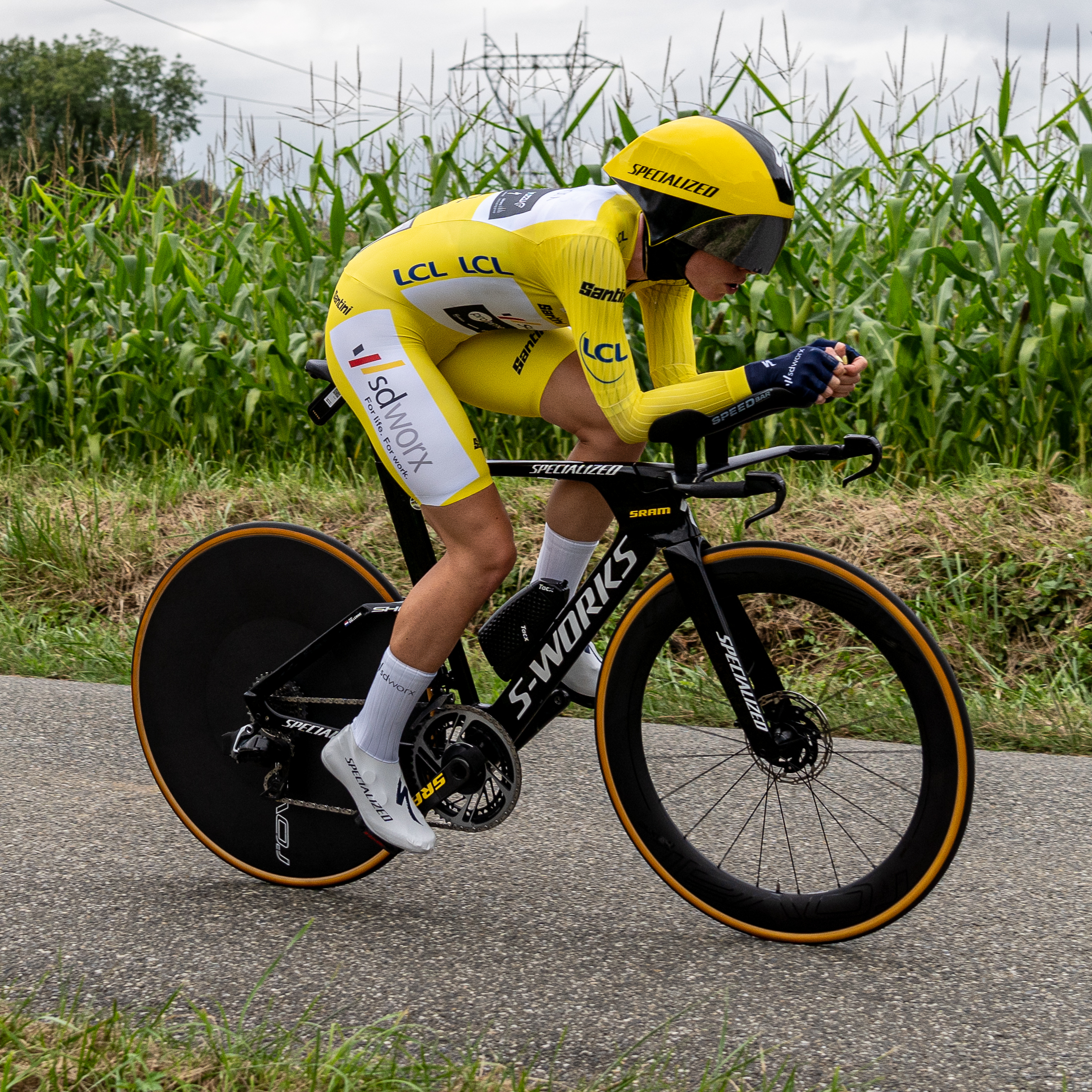
Demi Vollering riding the stage 8 time trial at the 2023 Tour de France Femmes

=== Subsequent editions ===
The route of the 2023 Tour was announced in October 2022 to praise from riders. The race started in Clermont-Ferrand on the day that the 2023 Tour de France finished, before heading south across the Massif Central towards the Pyrenees. The final stage was an individual time trial in Pau. As with the 2022 edition, the race took place over 8 stages. The race was won by Demi Vollering, beating her rival Annemiek van Vleuten with a dominant stage win on the Col du Tourmalet. Lotte Kopecky won the points classification, as well as finishing second overall. Kasia Niewiadoma took the polka-dot jersey as winner of the mountains classification, as well as finishing third overall. For the second year in succession, the race was praised by the public, media, teams and riders. Race director Marion Rousse stated that the 2023 edition "was the year of confirmation: we had to prove that the first edition was not just curiosity".

The route of the 2024 Tour was announced in October 2023. Due to the Paris 2024 Summer Olympics taking place immediately after the 2024 Tour de France, the 2024 edition did not take place immediately after the men's tour. Instead, it took place in the short gap between the Olympic Games and the 2024 Summer Paralympics. The race has its first Grand Départ outside France, starting in Rotterdam, with three stages in the Netherlands. The route headed south towards the Alps, with the final stage having a summit finish at the iconic Alpe d'Huez. The race was won by Kasia Niewiadoma, beating Vollering by just four seconds after Vollering lost time in a crash on stage 5. Marianne Vos took the green jersey of the points classification for the second time, and Justine Ghekiere won the mountains classification. Again, the race was praised by the public, media, teams and riders, with Cycling Weekly noting that the "razor-thin" margin of victory demonstrated the "extraordinary level of competition in women's cycling and the depth of talent in the field".

The route of the 2025 Tour was announced in October 2024. The race had a Grand Départ in Brittany in north-west France, and was extended to nine days in length. The race was won by French rider Pauline Ferrand-Prévot by over three and a half minutes, after two stage wins in the Alps. Vollering finished second overall, with Katarzyna Niewiadoma-Phinney in third. Ferrand-Prévot became the first French winner of the Tour de France Femmes, and the first French win at the Tour de France since Bernard Hinault at the 1985 Tour de France and Jeannie Longo at the 1989 Tour de France Féminin. Lorena Wiebes won the green jersey of the points classification, and Elise Chabbey took the polka-dot jersey as the winner of the mountains classification. The race was widely praised, with large crowds attending the Grand Départ in Brittany, record television audiences in France, and accolades for winner Pauline Ferrand-Prévot – with L'Équipe stating that her victory had led to "unprecedented enthusiasm in women's cycling".

=== 2026 and beyond ===
In June 2025, it was announced that the 2026 edition of the race would have a Grand Départ in Switzerland, with stage starts in Lausanne, Aigle and Geneva. The race would start a week after the men's race, with ASO choosing to avoid an overlap with the men's race to allow for resources to be shared between the two races. The Guardian noted that the "new stand-alone date for the Femmes reveals how quickly the race has established itself and how popular it has become, particularly after the win of France’s Pauline Ferrand-Prévot". The route of the 2026 edition was announced in October 2025, with a summit finish on Mont Ventoux. Zwift announced that they had extended their title sponsorship of the race to 2029. From 2026, the UCI will award more ranking points to Giro d'Italia Women, Tour de France Femmes and the Vuelta Femenina compared to other races in the UCI Women's World Tour – elevating the three races in status.

In March 2025, it was announced that the 2027 edition of the race would start in the United Kingdom. In January 2026, more details were announced: the 2027 edition will start in Leeds, with the first three stages all in the United Kingdom. The 2027 Tour de France will also start in the UK, marking the first time that both the men's and women's races have started in the same nation outside France.

== Winners ==
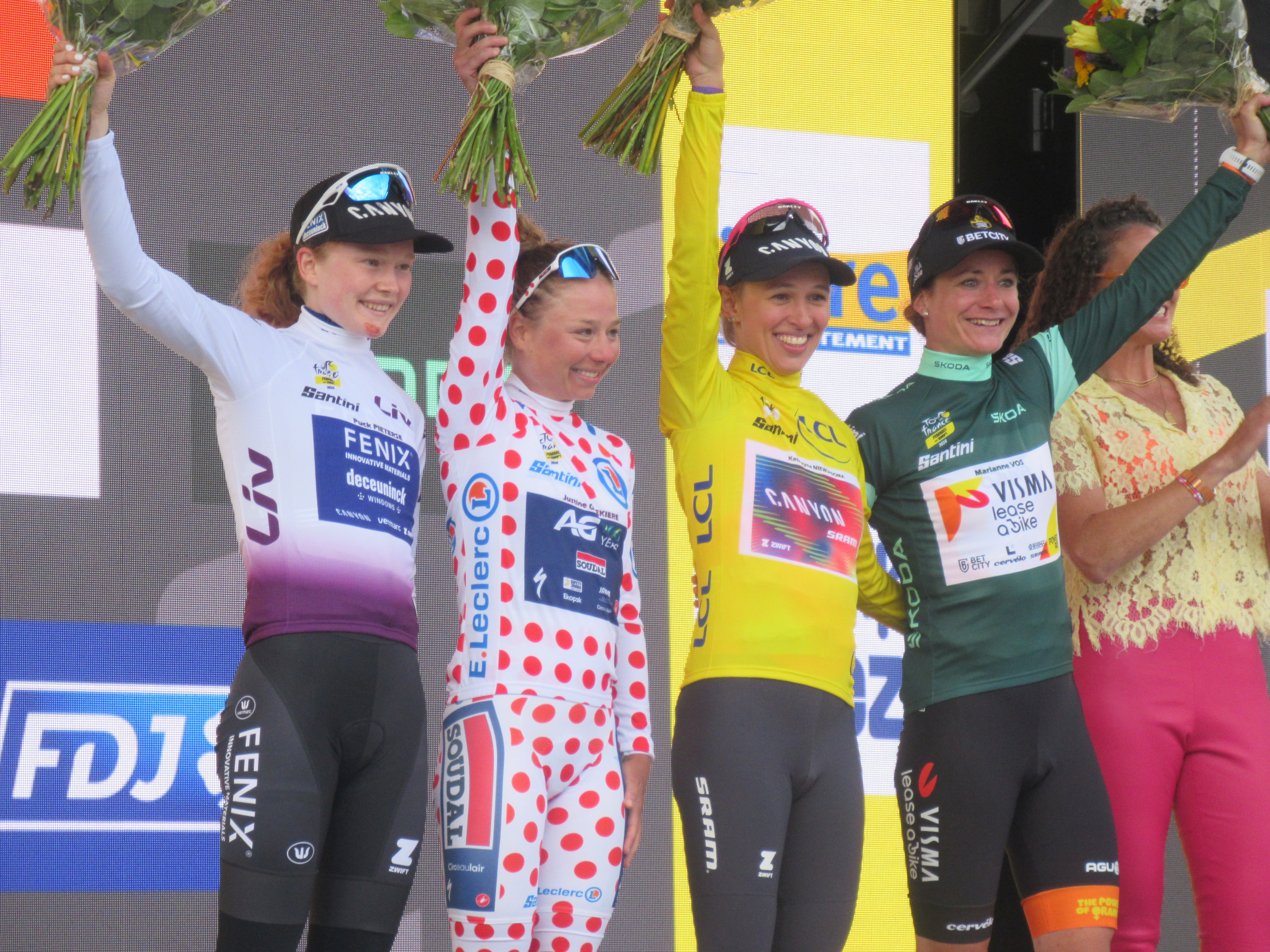
The four jerseys (left to right) for young rider, mountains, general and points classifications

Since 1955, various professional women's cycle stage races across France have historically been held as an equivalent to the Tour de France for women. Winners for those events can be found in the respective articles.

Year	Rider	Team	Time	Margin
2022	Annemiek van Vleuten (NED)	Movistar Team	26h 55' 44"	+ 3' 48"
2023	Demi Vollering (NED)	SD Worx	25h 17' 35"	+ 3' 03"
2024	Katarzyna Niewiadoma (POL)	Canyon//SRAM	24h 36' 07"	+ 4"
2025	Pauline Ferrand-Prévot (FRA)	Visma–Lease a Bike	29h 54' 24"	+ 3' 42"
2026	Demi Vollering (NED)	FDJ United–Suez	30h 54' 51"	+ 1' 18"

=== Secondary classifications ===
While the general classification is the most highly regarded, the race includes other competitions. The points classification goes to the rider who accumulates the most points for high finishes in stages and intermediate sprints, and is typically won by sprinters. The mountains classification gives points for the first rider to the top of specific climbs. The young rider classification is determined by overall time, with the same rules as the general classification, but only riders under the age of 23 are eligible. For the 2026 edition, the young rider classification was changed so riders under 24 could compete for the jersey. This change was not announced publicly until the race was underway, creating confusion for teams and riders.

Year	Points Classification	Mountains Classification	Young Rider Classification
2022	Marianne Vos (NED)	Demi Vollering (NED)	Shirin van Anrooij (NED)
2023	Lotte Kopecky (BEL)	Katarzyna Niewiadoma (POL)	Cédrine Kerbaol (FRA)
2024	Marianne Vos (NED)	Justine Ghekiere (BEL)	Puck Pieterse (NED)
2025	Lorena Wiebes (NED)	Elise Chabbey (SUI)	Nienke Vinke (NED)
2026	Lorena Wiebes (NED)	Puck Pieterse (NED)	Antonia Niedermaier (GER)

== Yellow jersey statistics ==
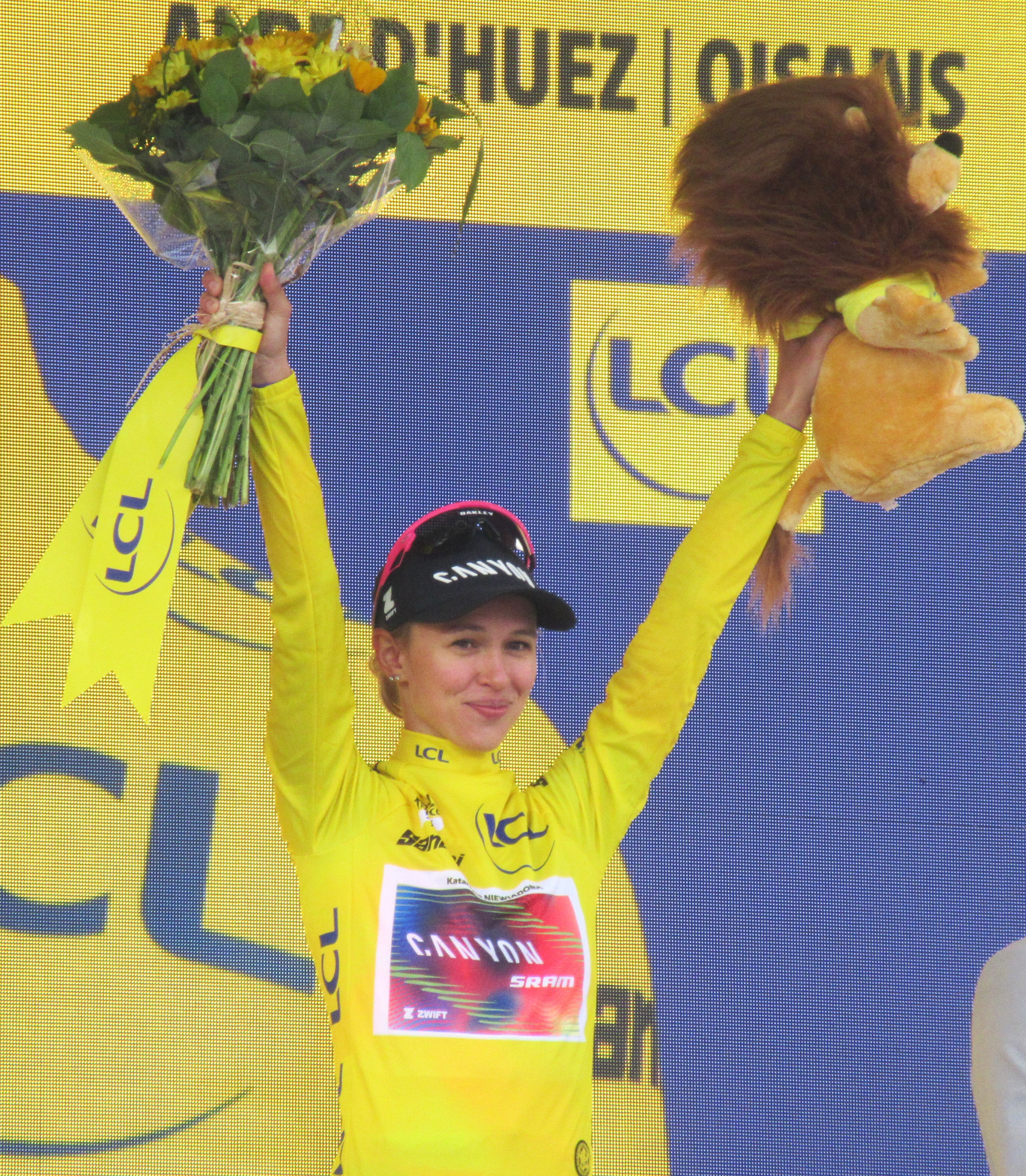
Katarzyna Niewiadoma in the yellow jersey celebrating her victory in the 2024 Tour de France Femmes

The "Jerseys" column lists the number of days that the cyclist wore the yellow jersey; the "Tour wins" column gives the number of times the cyclist won the general classification and the years in which the yellow jersey was worn, with bold years indicating an overall Tour win.

This table was updated after stage 9 of the 2026 Tour de France Femmes.

Key
Cyclists who are still active
Cyclists who won the Tour de France

Rank	Name	Country	Yellow jerseys	Tour wins	Years
1	Marianne Vos	Netherlands	8	0	2022, 2025
=2	Demi Vollering	Netherlands	6	2	2023, 2024, 2026
=2	Lotte Kopecky	Belgium	6	0	2023
4	Katarzyna Niewiadoma-Phinney	Poland	5	1	2024, 2026
5	Kimberley Le Court	Mauritius	4	0	2025
=6	Lorena Wiebes	Netherlands	3	0	2022, 2026
=6	Marlen Reusser	Switzerland	3	0	2026
=8	Annemiek van Vleuten	Netherlands	2	1	2022
=8	Charlotte Kool	Netherlands	2	0	2024
=8	Pauline Ferrand-Prévot	France	2	1	2025

== Multiple stage winners ==
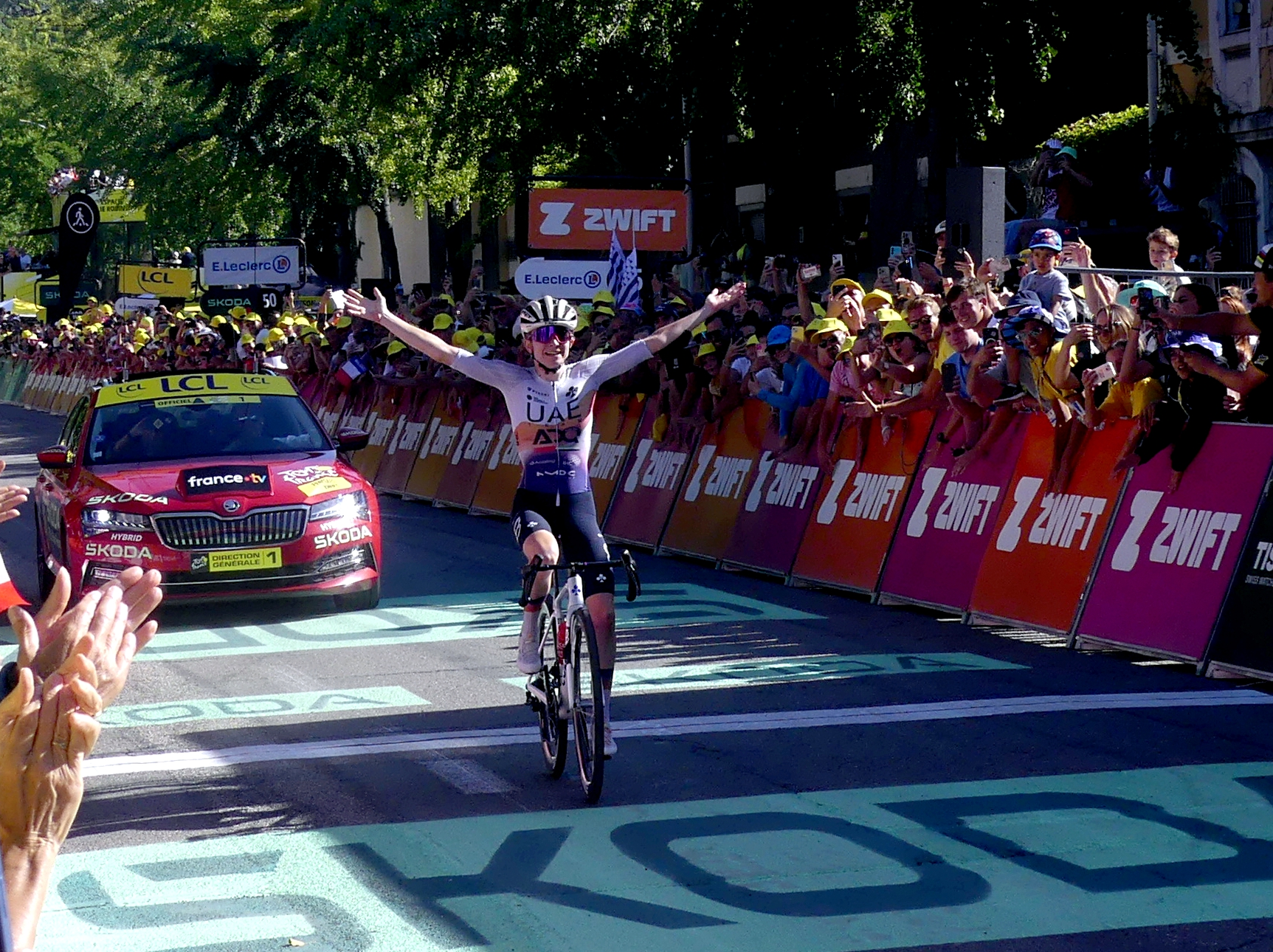
Maëva Squiban celebrating her stage win at the 2025 Tour de France Femmes

The following is a list of riders who have won multiple stages of the Tour de France Femmes. This table was updated after stage 9 of the 2026 Tour de France Femmes.

Key
Cyclists who are still active
Cyclists who won the Tour de France

Rank	Name	Country	Stage wins	Years
1	Lorena Wiebes	Netherlands	7	2022, 2023, 2025, 2026
2	Demi Vollering	Netherlands	6	2023, 2024, 2026
=3	Marianne Vos	Netherlands	3	2022, 2025
=3	Marlen Reusser	Switzerland	3	2022, 2023, 2026
=5	Annemiek van Vleuten	Netherlands	2	2022
=5	Charlotte Kool	Netherlands	2	2024
=5	Maeva Squiban	France	2	2025
=5	Pauline Ferrand-Prévot	France	2	2025
=5	Kimberley Le Court	Mauritius	2	2025, 2026

== Starts abroad ==
The start of the Tour is known as the Grand Départ. The following editions of the Tour started, or are planned to start, outside France:

- 2024: Rotterdam, Netherlands
- 2026: Lausanne, Switzerland

Future

- 2027: Leeds, United Kingdom

== See also ==
- Giro d'Italia Women – a stage race in Italy
- La Vuelta Femenina – a stage race in Spain
