= Kathryn Bertine =

Saint Kitts and Nevis cyclist (born 1975)

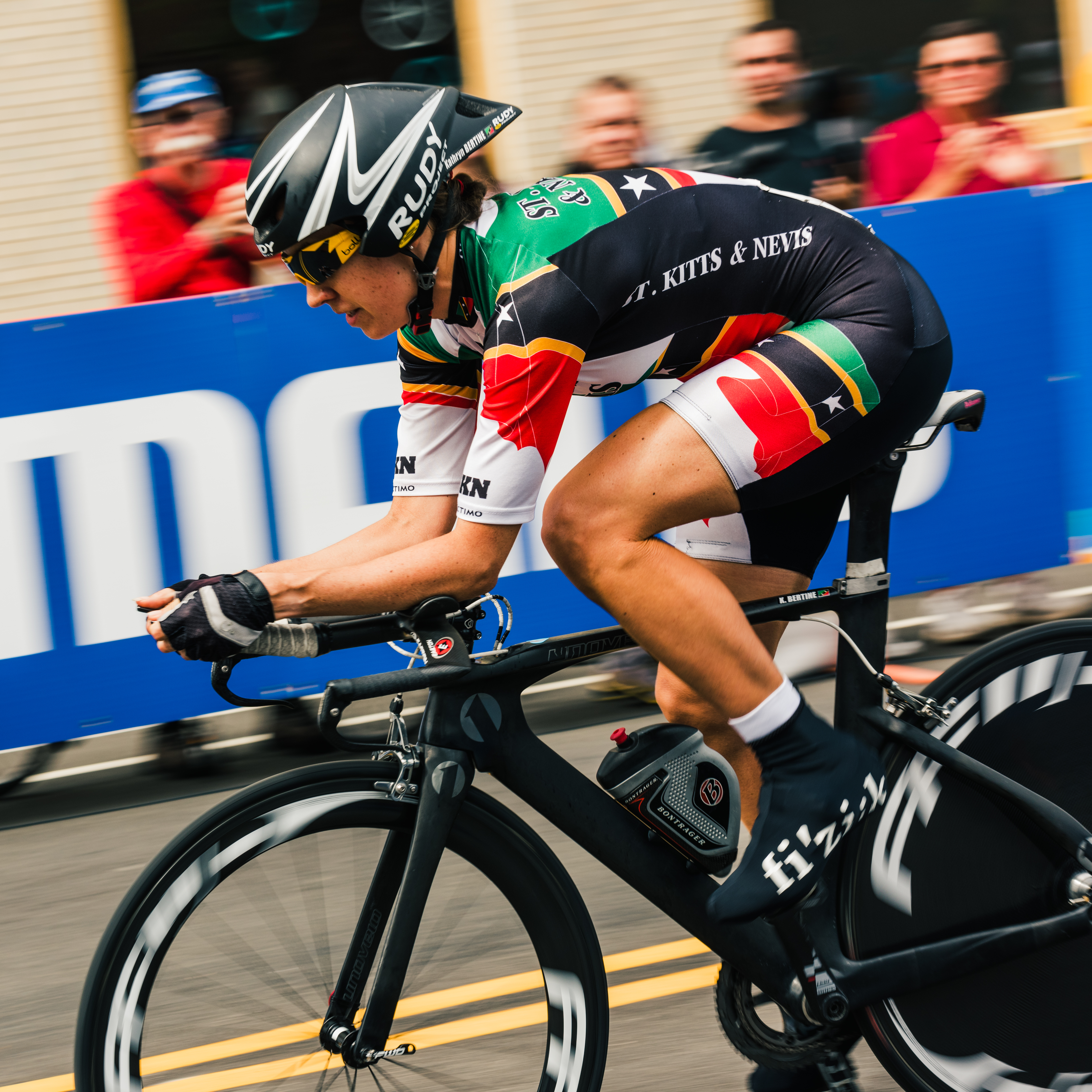
- Bertine at the 2015 UCI Road World Championships

Personal information
- Born: 11 May 1975 (age 51) Bronxville, New York

Cycling career
- Sport: Cycling
- Role: Rider

Amateur teams
- 2009: Specialized D4W/Bicycle Haus
- 2010-2011: TriSports Cycling-Eclipse Racing

Professional teams
- 2007: Sport Beans/NTTC
- 2012-2013: Colavita-espnW Pro Cycling
- 2014: Wiggle High5
- 2015: BMW p/b Happy Tooth Dental
- 2016-2017: Cylance Pro Cycling

Major wins
- Saint Kitts and Nevis National Road Race Champion (2009–2011); Saint Kitts and Nevis National Time Trial Champion (2009–2011)

Kathryn Bertine (born 11 May 1975) is a Saint Kitts and Nevis racing cyclist, author, activist, film-maker and former professional figure skater and professional triathlete. She turned professional in road cycling in 2012 and raced on World Tour teams until 2017. Bertine competed in eight UCI Road World Championships, won three Caribbean Championship titles and six Saint Kitts and Nevis National Championship titles.

She is best known for her activism in petitioning the organisers of the Tour de France, the Amaury Sport Organisation, to launch a women's Tour de France.

== Biography ==
Bertine was born in Bronxville, New York. After a sporting childhood, she became a professional figure skater aged 23, appearing in ice skating shows including the Ice Capades and Holiday on Ice. She undertook her undergraduate education at Colgate University, where she competed in cross country running and rowing alongside skating. After graduating she took a year out to travel and pursue her skating career, before returning to education to study for a Master of Fine Arts degree at the University of Arizona.

Whilst in Arizona she took up competing in triathlon, eventually spending three years as a professional in the sport. Her first book was published in 2003, a memoir of her sporting childhood and professional figure skating career. By 2005, Bertine was a professional triathlete, however this was not financially sustainable.

In 2006, she began working with ESPN on a project to take her to the Olympics. The idea was to see if she, "a decently talented but by no means gifted athlete", could make it to the 2008 Summer Olympics in Beijing. After attempting multiple sports including handball, open water swimming and modern pentathlon, she chose road cycling. In January 2007, she took up Saint Kitts and Nevis citizenship to improve her chances of selection for the Olympics, after failing to make the United States team. Bertine did not make the selection for the Olympics, but continued to compete as a cyclist for Saint Kitts and Nevis, winning the national road race and time trial championships three times between 2009 and 2011.

After experiencing the gender inequities in sport, Bertin became an activist for women's cycling. Frustrated why there was no official 'Women's Tour de France', Bertine wrote to the organisers of the race—Amaury Sport Organisation (ASO)—with a business plan on how such a race could be created. No response was received.

Her cycling career continued, with her first professional contract with Team Colavita in 2012. She also began work on a documentary film about women's cycling, interviewing key members of the peloton, asking them about the inequalities of women's cycling. Bertine subsequently explained that her activism was ignored by the governing body, and that teams asked her to keep quiet about the issue.

In 2013, Bertine and Dutch rider Marianne Vos, English rider Emma Pooley and triathlete Chrissie Wellington formed an activist group called Le Tour Entier (“the whole tour”), to petition ASO to launch a women's Tour de France. A manifesto was published, and over 100,000 signatures were received. In October 2013, the group met with ASO to work out how a women's race could be included in the Tour.

In April 2014, Half the Road, her documentary film on women's cycling was released. In July 2014, the first edition of La Course by Le Tour de France was staged on the Champs-Élysées in Paris, ahead of the final stage of the 2014 Tour de France. Organised by ASO, La Course was welcomed by the professional peloton, media and campaigners, with Bertine praised for being the "catalyst" behind the push for the race. Bertine raced for Wiggle Honda in 2014, taking the start line on the Champs-Élysées.

Bertine joined BMW p/b Happy Tooth Dental in 2015, making her debut with the team at Grand Prix cycliste de Gatineau in June of that year. In November 2015 she was announced as part of the Cylance Pro Cycling team for the 2016 season. Bertine continued to criticise cycling's governing body and race organisers, expressing disappointment that La Course had not evolved into a multi day stage race. In 2017, she retired from professional racing, and created the Homestretch Foundation, which assists female pro athletes who struggle with the gender pay gap. Her fourth book, a memoir on activism, was published in February 2021.

Bertine continued her activism for women's cycling, working with others in the professional peloton to push for a minimum wage for professional cyclists, greater live TV coverage and a continued push for a women's Tour de France. In 2021, ASO announced that the Tour de France Femmes would be held over 8 days in July 2022. The announcement was met with praise by the media, peloton and campaigners including Bertine. She did caution that the women's race would be significantly shorter than the men's race, with less prize money and TV coverage.

== Major results ==
2009
1st Saint Kitts and Nevis National Time Trial Championships
1st Saint Kitts and Nevis National Road Race Championships
2010
10th Pan American Time Trial Championships
1st Saint Kitts and Nevis National Time Trial Championships
1st Saint Kitts and Nevis National Road Race Championships
1st Flapjack Flats Time Trial
2011
1st Saint Kitts and Nevis National Time Trial Championships
1st Saint Kitts and Nevis National Road Race Championships
5th Valley of the Sun Stage Race
2012
2nd Tucson Bicycle Classic
5th Valley of the Sun Stage Race
2013
1st Caribbean Time Trial Championships

2014
1st Caribbean Time Trial Championships

2015
1st Caribbean Time Trial Championships

== Works ==
- STAND: A memoir on activism. A manual for progress. What really happens when we stand on the front lines of change. (2021, New Shelf Press; ISBN 1735901407)
- The Road Less Taken: Lessons from a Life Spent Cycling (2014, Triumph Books; ISBN 1735901423)
- As Good as Gold: 1 Woman, 9 Sports, 10 Countries, and a 2-Year Quest to Make the Summer Olympics (2010, ESPN Books; ISBN 1933060530)
- All the Sundays Yet to Come: A Skater's Journey (2003, Little, Brown and Company; ISBN 0316099015)
