= UCI Women's World Tour =

Premier annual female elite road cycling tour

- Current season, competition or edition: 2026 UCI Women's World Tour
- Sport: Cycling
- Founded: 2016
- Organising body: Union Cycliste Internationale
- No. of teams: 15
- Country: International
- Most recent champions: Individual: Demi Vollering (NED); Teams: SD Worx (2023 UCI Women's World Tour)
- Most titles: Individual: Annemiek van Vleuten (NED) (3 titles); Teams: SD Worx (7 titles)
- Website: www.uci.org/competition-hub/2026-uci-womens-worldtour/6LnilgjMX1hpP07gDyBbGN

The UCI Women's World Tour (stylized as WorldTour) is the premier annual female elite road cycling tour. As of 2025, the tour includes 27 events in Europe, Asia and Oceania – with one-day races such as Strade Bianche Donne and Paris–Roubaix Femmes, stage races such as Women's Tour Down Under, as well as week long stage races (sometimes referred to as a "Grand Tour") such as Tour de France Femmes.

== History ==
From 1998, the Union Cycliste Internationale (UCI) held the UCI Women's Road World Cup, a series of 8 to 10 one-day races held predominantly in Europe. Although similarly branded, races did not have the same level of coverage as men's races. Initially, many classic cycle races did not stage equivalent women's races – the Tour of Flanders for Women was first held in 2004, for example.

In September 2013, Brian Cookson was elected president of the UCI – with his manifesto setting out improvements for women's cycling including a minimum wage, better television coverage, new races and better relationship between the UCI, teams and race organisers. Le Tour Entier – an activist group to improve women's cycle racing – published a manifesto in 2013 calling for a women's Tour de France as well as other improvements for women's cycling including creation of a women's World Tour.

In December 2014, the UCI held a summit to discuss how to increase the coverage of women's cycling, attended by the UCI Women's Working Group, event organisers and the UCI Women's Teams.

In March 2015, the UCI announced that the UCI Women's Road World Cup would be replaced by the UCI Women's World Tour from 2016, creating a season-long competition equivalent to the men's UCI World Tour. The Women's World Tour would have:

- a large increase in the number of racing days, with stage races as well as one-day events
- an increase in the maximum length of stages and races
- minimum levels of prize money
- top 15 teams designated as UCI Women's World Teams, automatically invited to events
- a minimum and maximum number of riders per team, depending on the event
- races broadcast on live television or via streaming
- race organisers providing media information in English and/or French
- an individual and teams champion at the end of each season

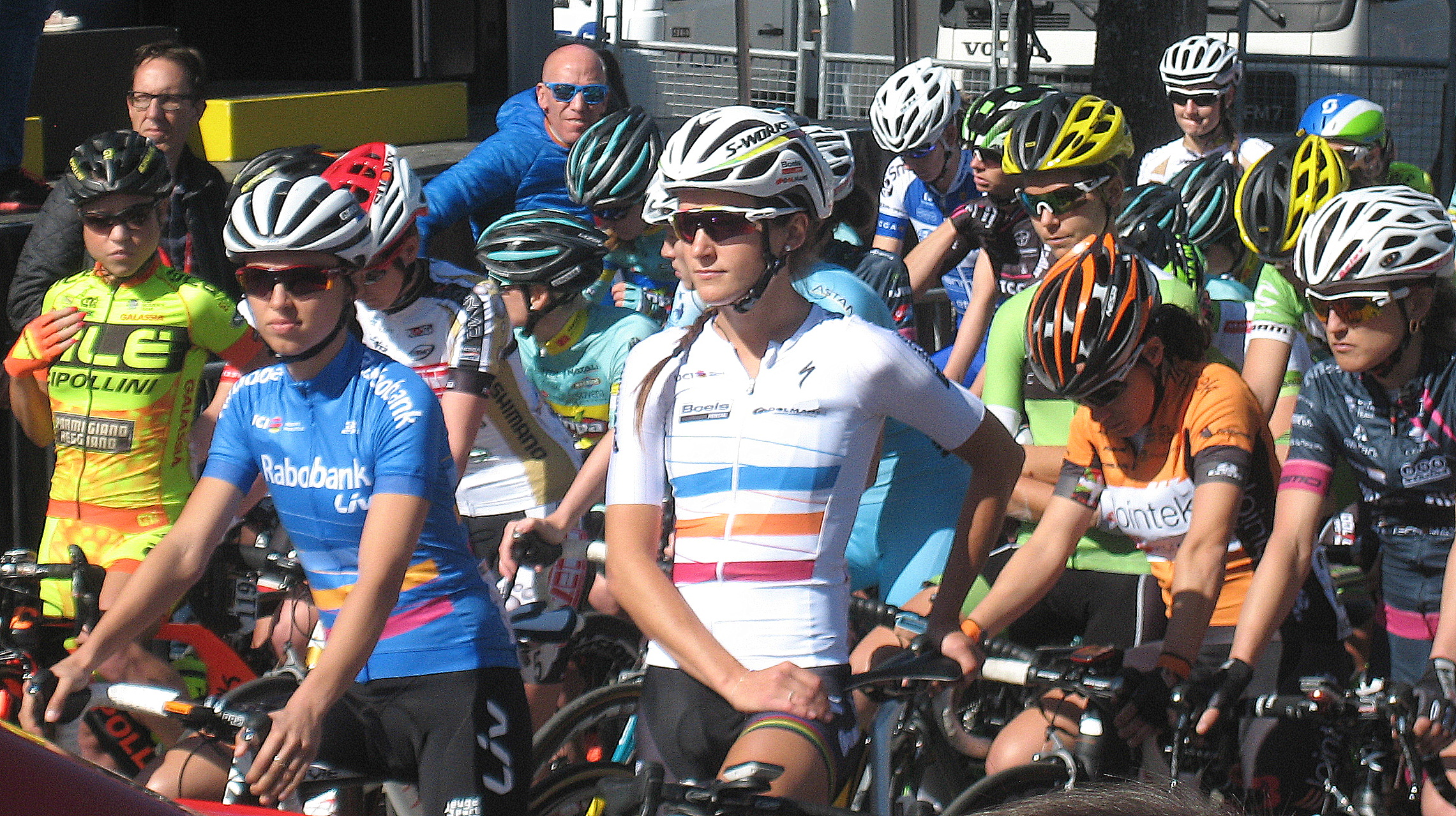
Kasia Niewiadoma (l) and Lizzie Armitstead (r), pictured at the 2016 Flèche Wallonne, wearing the distinctive leader jerseys of the youth classification and individual women's elite classification, respectively.

The announcement was welcomed by teams, with Wiggle-Honda stating that the "new structure for women's cycling has been accepted with open arms" and that the teams and the UCI "all seem to be on the same page and working towards the same goals together".

The calendar for the inaugural season was announced in September 2015, including many of the longstanding one-day events from the UCI Women's Road World Cup (such as Trofeo Alfredo Binda and Tour of Flanders) as well as established stage races such as the Giro d'Italia Femminile. The UCI called the series "a major step forward" for professional women's cycling. Identical branding for both the Women's World Tour and the UCI World Tour was introduced.

Between 2016 and 2024, the tour contained an individual women's elite classification and youth classification, with the leader of each wearing a distinctive jersey – a burgundy jersey for the individual classification and a light blue jersey for the youth classification.

From 2020, a two-tier system of teams was introduced, with the top tier of teams required to have a minimum salary of €15,000 for riders, as well as insurance and rights including maternity leave. This was welcomed by The Cyclists' Alliance – a union of professional riders. Several UCI WorldTeams set up female squads, including Movistar (launched 2017), Trek–Segafredo (launched 2018) and Jumbo–Visma (launched 2020).

The 2020 season was extensively affected by the COVID-19 pandemic, which resulted in two-thirds of the races on the calendar being either postponed or cancelled outright. The UCI ProSeries was also launched in 2020, as a second-tier tour below the World Tour.

The UCI has ensured that events have live television or streaming coverage – the Giro d'Italia Donne was removed from the 2021 calendar after failing to provide adequate live television coverage for the 2020 edition of the race, and the RideLondon Classique was warned that it would be demoted to the UCI ProSeries if live television was not provided for all stages, as only the final stage of the 2022 edition of the race was broadcast. Riders from The Cyclists' Alliance – a union representing the female peloton – stated that live TV coverage for races was their biggest priority, rather than prize money.

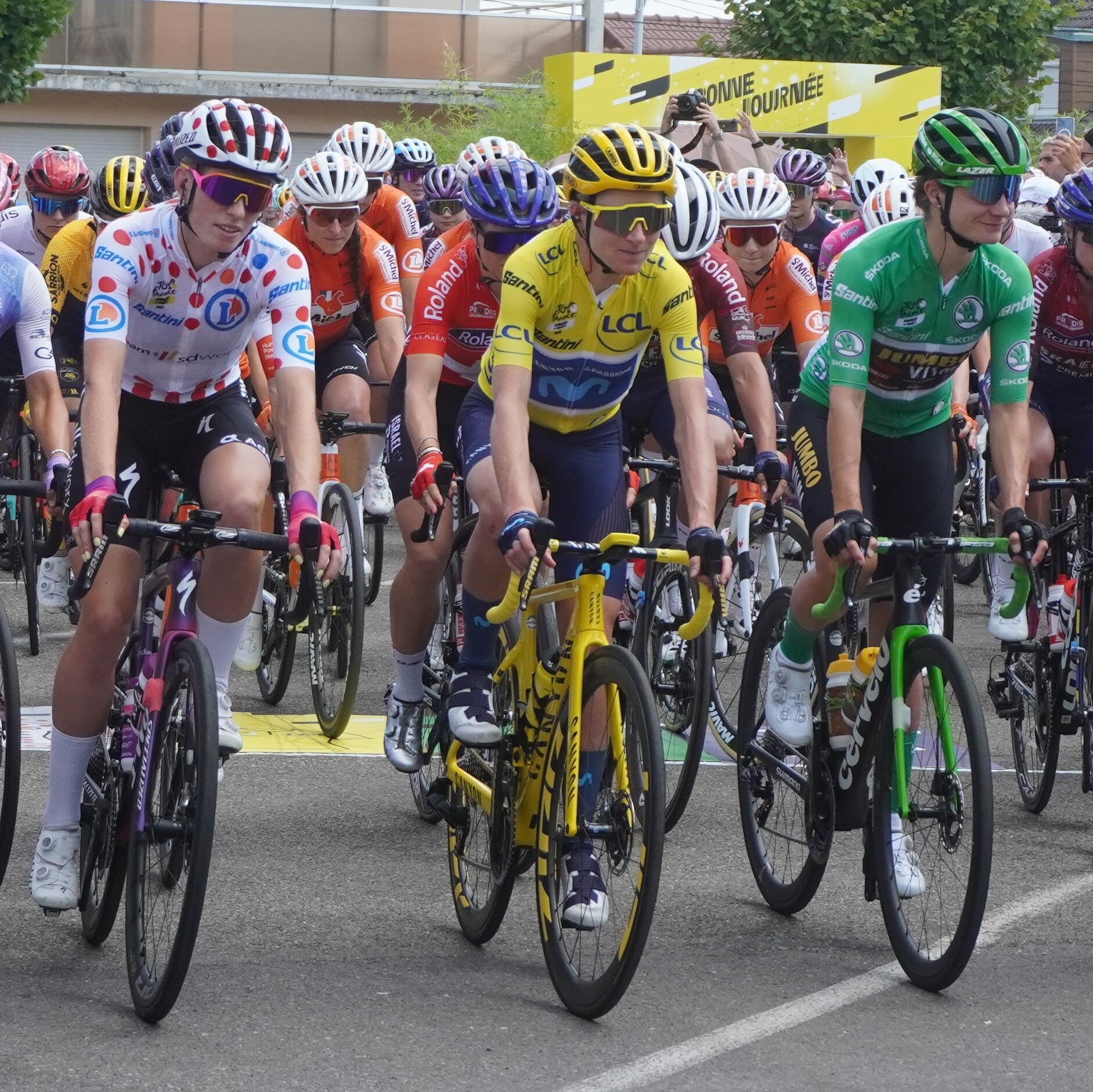
Demi Vollering (left), Annemiek van Vleuten (centre) and Marianne Vos (right) at the 2022 Tour de France Femmes

In 2022, the Tour de France Femmes was staged for the first time, becoming the biggest stage race on the calendar. In 2023, the Challenge by La Vuelta increased in length to 7 days, becoming La Vuelta Femenina. As of 2025, many of the UCI World Tour races hold equivalent races for women, including all three Grand Tour races.

From 2023, the minimum number of riders and members of staff in each team was increased, with the minimum wage having risen to over €30,000. In July 2023, UCI Women's World Tour announced a precautionary ban on trans women from competing.

Since 2025, the Tour has no longer been a ranking competition in its own right, with the rankings having been removed from the UCI's Road Race regulations. The distinctive jerseys for the leaders of the youth classification and individual women's elite classification are no longer used. Media noted that "the Women’s WorldTour leader’s jersey never fully captured public attention".

From 2026, the UCI will award more ranking points to the week long stage races and monuments than other stage or one-day races in the Tour.

== Events ==
As of 2026, the calendar features 27 events, with:

- La Vuelta Femenina, Giro d'Italia Women and Tour de France Femmes, the longest and biggest stage races in the women's calendar. Some media and teams have referred to these events as Grand Tours, as they are the biggest events in the women's calendar.
- 4 cycling monuments (Milan–San Remo Women, Tour of Flanders, Paris–Roubaix Femmes, Liège–Bastogne–Liège Femmes),
- 5 stage races and 10 one-day races in Europe
- 1 stage race in the Middle East
- 1 stage race and 1 one-day race in China
- 1 stage race and 1 one-day race in Australia.

Compared to the UCI Women's Road World Cup, the Women's WorldTour features stage races as well as one-day races. The maximum distance was increased, with one-day races having a maximum length of 160 kilometres, and average stage race stage distance having a maximum length of 140 kilometres. Race organisers are allowed to apply for special dispensation to have longer stages. Campaign groups such as Le Tour Entier and The Cyclists' Alliance continue to push organisers and the UCI to allow for longer stage races for women.

For events to be considered they must have reached the following criteria:

- UCI Class 1 Road status
- Dates of candidate events must not clash with existing Women's World Cup and Class 1 events
- Dates and locations of candidate events must fit with the narrative of the season, whilst also providing some logic for the travel of teams

Current events (as of the 2026 season)
One-day races	Cycling monuments	Stage races	Week long stage races (Grand Tour)
Cadel Evans Great Ocean Road Race	Milan–San Remo Women	Women's Tour Down Under	La Vuelta Femenina
Omloop Het Nieuwsblad	Tour of Flanders	UAE Tour Women	Giro d'Italia Women
Strade Bianche Donne	Paris–Roubaix Femmes	Itzulia Women	Tour de France Femmes
Trofeo Alfredo Binda	Liège–Bastogne–Liège Femmes	Vuelta a Burgos Feminas	
Tour of Bruges		Tour of Britain Women	
Gent–Wevelgem		Tour de Suisse Women	
Dwars door Vlaanderen		Tour de Romandie Féminin	
Amstel Gold Race		Tour of Chongming Island	
La Flèche Wallonne Femmes			
Copenhagen Sprint			
Classic Lorient Agglomération			
Tour of Guangxi			
Former events
One-day races	Cycling monuments	Stage races	Grand Tour
The Philadelphia Cycling Classic		Ladies Tour of Norway	
La Course by Le Tour de France		Tour of California	
Clásica de San Sebastián		Emakumeen Bira	
Open de Suède Vårgårda		Challenge by La Vuelta	
Ronde van Drenthe		RideLondon Classique	
		Tour of Scandinavia	
		Simac Ladies Tour of Holland	

== Winners by race ==
=== 2016–2021 ===
Races in the UCI Women's World Tour
Race	2016	2017	2018	2019	2020	2021
(Australia) Cadel Evans Great Ocean Road Race	Not part of the WWT				(Germany) Lippert	Cancelled
(Italy) Strade Bianche	(United Kingdom) Deignan (1/10)	(Italy) Longo Borghini (1/12)	(Netherlands) van der Breggen (7/17)	(Netherlands) van Vleuten (6/20)	(Netherlands) van Vleuten (9/20)	(Netherlands) van den Broek-Blaak (5/6)
(Italy) Trofeo Alfredo Binda-Comune di Cittiglio	(United Kingdom) Deignan (2/10)	(United States) Rivera (1/4)	(Poland) Niewiadoma (2/5)	(Netherlands) Vos (4/10)	Cancelled	(Italy) Longo Borghini (3/12)
(Belgium) Driedaagse Brugge–De Panne	Not on calendar		(Belgium) D'Hoore (4/5)	(Netherlands) Wild (3/4)	(Netherlands) Wiebes (3/19)	(Australia) Brown (1/3)
(Belgium) Gent–Wevelgem	(Netherlands) Blaak (2/6)	(Finland) Lepistö (1/2)	(Italy) Bastianelli (1/4)	(Netherlands) Wild (4/4)	(Belgium) D'Hoore (5/5)	(Netherlands) Vos (7/10)
(Belgium) Ronde van Vlaanderen	(United Kingdom) Deignan (3/10)	(United States) Rivera (2/4)	(Netherlands) van der Breggen (8/17)	(Italy) Bastianelli (3/4)	(Netherlands) van den Broek-Blaak (4/6)	(Netherlands) van Vleuten (10/20)
(France) Paris–Roubaix	Not on calendar				Cancelled	(United Kingdom) Deignan (10/10)
(Netherlands) Amstel Gold Race	Not on calendar	(Netherlands) van der Breggen (2/17)	(Netherlands) Blaak (3/6)	(Poland) Niewiadoma (3/5)	Cancelled	(Netherlands) Vos (8/10)
(Belgium) La Flèche Wallonne	(Netherlands) van der Breggen (1/17)	(Netherlands) van der Breggen (3/17)	(Netherlands) van der Breggen (9/17)	(Netherlands) van der Breggen (11/17)	(Netherlands) van der Breggen (15/17)	(Netherlands) van der Breggen (16/17)
(Belgium) Liège–Bastogne–Liège	Not on calendar	(Netherlands) van der Breggen (4/17)	(Netherlands) van der Breggen (10/17)	(Netherlands) van Vleuten (7/20)	(United Kingdom) Deignan (9/10)	(Netherlands) Vollering (1/24)
(Spain) Vuelta a Burgos Feminas	Not part of the WWT					(Netherlands) van der Breggen (17/17)
(United Kingdom) RideLondon Classique	(Netherlands) Wild (1/4)	(United States) Rivera (3/4)	(Netherlands) Wild (2/4)	(Netherlands) Wiebes (1/19)	Cancelled	Cancelled
(United States) Amgen Tour of California	(United States) Guarnier (1/3)	(Netherlands) van der Breggen (5/17)	(United States) Hall	(Netherlands) van der Breggen (12/17)	Not on calendar	
(Spain) Emakumeen Bira	Not part of the WWT		(Australia) Spratt	(Italy) Longo Borghini (2/12)	Not on calendar	
(United States) Philadelphia International Cycling Classic	(United States) Guarnier (2/3)	Cancelled	Not on calendar			
(Italy) Giro d'Italia Femminile	(United States) Guarnier (3/3)	(Netherlands) van der Breggen (6/17)	(Netherlands) van Vleuten (3/20)	(Netherlands) van Vleuten (8/20)	(Netherlands) van der Breggen (14/17)	Part of the UCI ProSeries
La Course by Le Tour de France	(Australia) Hosking (2/3)	(Netherlands) van Vleuten (1/20)	(Netherlands) van Vleuten (4/20)	(Netherlands) Vos (5/10)	(United Kingdom) Deignan (8/10)	(Netherlands) Vollering (2/24)
(Spain) Clásica de San Sebastián	Not on calendar			Not part of the WWT	Cancelled	(Netherlands) van Vleuten (11/20)
Vårgårda WestSweden TTT	Boels–Dolmans (1/3)	Boels–Dolmans (2/3)	Boels–Dolmans (3/3)	Trek–Segafredo (1/2)	Cancelled	
Vårgårda WestSweden RR	(Sweden) Fahlin	(Finland) Lepistö (2/2)	(Netherlands) Vos (2/10)	(Italy) Bastianelli (4/4)	Cancelled	
Ladies Tour of Norway TTT	Not on calendar		Team Sunweb	Not on calendar		
Ladies Tour of Norway	Not part of the WWT	(Netherlands) Vos (1/10)	(Netherlands) Vos (3/10)	(Netherlands) Vos (6/10)	Cancelled	(Netherlands) van Vleuten (12/20)
(Netherlands) Boels Ladies Tour	Not part of the WWT	(Netherlands) van Vleuten (2/20)	(Netherlands) van Vleuten (5/20)	(Luxembourg) Majerus	Cancelled	(Netherlands) van den Broek-Blaak (6/6)
(France) GP de Plouay	(Poland) Bujak	(United Kingdom) Deignan (5/10)	(Netherlands) Pieters (2/2)	(Netherlands) van der Breggen (13/17)	(United Kingdom) Deignan (7/10)	(Italy) Longo Borghini (4/12)
(Spain) La Madrid Challenge by La Vuelta	(Belgium) D'Hoore (1/5)	(Belgium) D'Hoore (3/5)	(Netherlands) van Dijk	(Germany) Brennauer (1/2)	(Germany) Brennauer (2/2)	(Netherlands) van Vleuten (13/20)
(United Kingdom) The Women's Tour	(United Kingdom) Deignan (4/10)	(Poland) Niewiadoma (1/5)	(United States) Rivera (4/4)	(United Kingdom) Deignan (6/10)	Cancelled	(Netherlands) Vollering (3/24)
(China) Tour of Chongming Island	(Australia) Hosking (1/3)	(Belgium) D'Hoore (2/5)	(Germany) Becker	(Netherlands) Wiebes (2/19)	Cancelled	
(China) Tour of Guangxi	Not on calendar	Not part of the WWT	(Cuba) Sierra	(Australia) Hosking (3/3)	Cancelled	
(Netherlands) Ronde van Drenthe	(Netherlands) Blaak (1/6)	(Denmark) Dideriksen	(Netherlands) Pieters (1/2)	(Italy) Bastianelli (2/4)	Cancelled	(Netherlands) Wiebes (4/19)

=== 2022–2027 ===
Races in the UCI Women's World Tour
Race	2022	2023	2024	2025	2026	2027
(Australia) Tour Down Under	Cancelled	(Australia) Brown (2/3)	(Australia) Gigante	(Switzerland) Rüegg (1/2)	(Switzerland) Rüegg (2/2)	
(Australia) Cadel Evans Great Ocean Road Race	Cancelled	(Netherlands) Adegeest	(Netherlands) Reijnhout	(New Zealand) Wollaston (1/3)	(New Zealand) Wollaston (3/3)	
(United Arab Emirates) UAE Tour	Not on calendar	(Italy) Longo Borghini (7/12)	(Belgium) Kopecky (6/13)	(Italy) Longo Borghini (10/12)	(Italy) Longo Borghini (12/12)	
(Belgium) Omloop Het Nieuwsblad	Not part of the WWT	(Belgium) Kopecky (3/13)	(Netherlands) Vos (9/10)	(Belgium) Claes	(Netherlands) Vollering (19/24)	
(Italy) Strade Bianche Donne	(Belgium) Kopecky (1/13)	(Netherlands) Vollering (5/24)	(Belgium) Kopecky (7/13)	(Netherlands) Vollering (16/24)	(Switzerland) Chabbey (2/2)	
(Netherlands) Ronde van Drenthe	(Netherlands) Wiebes (5/19)	(Netherlands) Wiebes (8/19)	(Netherlands) Wiebes (9/19)	Cancelled	Not on calendar	
(Italy) Trofeo Alfredo Binda-Comune di Cittiglio	(Italy) Balsamo (1/7)	(Netherlands) van Anrooij	(Italy) Balsamo (4/7)	(Italy) Balsamo (6/7)	(Netherlands) Swinkels	
(Italy) Milano–San Remo Donne	Not on calendar			(Netherlands) Wiebes (12/19)	(Belgium) Kopecky (13/13)	
(Belgium) Tour of Bruges	(Italy) Balsamo (2/7)	(United Kingdom) Georgi	(Italy) Balsamo (5/7)	(Netherlands) Wiebes (13/19)	(United Kingdom) Lloyd	
(Belgium) Gent–Wevelgem	(Italy) Balsamo (3/7)	(Switzerland) Reusser (1/7)	(Netherlands) Wiebes (10/19)	(Netherlands) Wiebes (14/19)	(Netherlands) Wiebes (17/19)	
(Belgium) Dwars door Vlaanderen	Not part of the WWT				(Switzerland) Reusser (6/7)	
(Belgium) Tour of Flanders	(Belgium) Kopecky (2/13)	(Belgium) Kopecky (4/13)	(Italy) Longo Borghini (8/12)	(Belgium) Kopecky (12/13)	(Netherlands) Vollering (20/24)	
(France) Paris–Roubaix Femmes	(Italy) Longo Borghini (5/12)	(Canada) Jackson	(Belgium) Kopecky (8/13)	(France) Ferrand-Prévot (1/2)	(Germany) Koch	
(Netherlands) Amstel Gold Race	(Italy) Cavalli (1/2)	(Netherlands) Vollering (6/24)	(Netherlands) Vos (10/10)	(Netherlands) Bredewold (3/5)	(Spain) Blasi (1/2)	
(Belgium) La Flèche Wallonne Femmes	(Italy) Cavalli (2/2)	(Netherlands) Vollering (7/24)	(Poland) Niewiadoma (4/5)	(Netherlands) Pieterse	(Netherlands) Vollering (21/24)	
(Belgium) Liège–Bastogne–Liège Femmes	(Netherlands) van Vleuten (14/20)	(Netherlands) Vollering (8/24)	(Australia) Brown (3/3)	(Mauritius) Le Court (1/2)	(Netherlands) Vollering (22/24)	
(Spain) La Vuelta Femenina	(Netherlands) van Vleuten (17/20)	(Netherlands) van Vleuten (18/20)	(Netherlands) Vollering (12/24)	(Netherlands) Vollering (17/24)	(Spain) Blasi (2/2)	
(Spain) Itzulia Women	(Netherlands) Vollering (4/24)	(Switzerland) Reusser (2/7)	(Netherlands) Vollering (13/24)	(Netherlands) Vollering (18/24)	(Netherlands) Bredewold (5/5)	
(Spain) Vuelta a Burgos Feminas	(France) Labous	(Netherlands) Vollering (9/24)	(Netherlands) Vollering (14/24)	(Switzerland) Reusser (4/7)	(Netherlands) Kastelijn	
(Italy) Giro d'Italia Women	(Netherlands) van Vleuten (15/20)	(Netherlands) van Vleuten (19/20)	(Italy) Longo Borghini (9/12)	(Italy) Longo Borghini (11/12)	(Netherlands) Vollering (23/24)	
(Denmark) Copenhagen Sprint	Not on calendar			(Netherlands) Wiebes (15/19)	(Netherlands) Wiebes (18/19)	
(Switzerland) Tour de Suisse Women	Not part of the WWT	(Switzerland) Reusser (3/7)	(Netherlands) Vollering (15/24)	(Switzerland) Reusser (5/7)	(Switzerland) Reusser (7/7)	
(United Kingdom) RideLondon Classique	(Netherlands) Wiebes (6/19)	(Netherlands) Kool	(Netherlands) Wiebes (11/19)	Cancelled	Not on calendar	
(United Kingdom) Tour of Britain Women	(Italy) Longo Borghini (6/12)	Cancelled	(Belgium) Kopecky (9/13)	(New Zealand) Wollaston (2/3)	(Mauritius) Le Court (2/2)	
Tour de France Femmes	(Netherlands) van Vleuten (16/20)	(Netherlands) Vollering (10/24)	(Poland) Niewiadoma (5/5)	(France) Ferrand-Prévot (2/2)	(Netherlands) Vollering (24/24)	
Vårgårda WestSweden TTT	Trek–Segafredo (2/2)	Not on calendar				
Vårgårda WestSweden RR	(France) Cordon-Ragot	Not on calendar				
(Norway) (Sweden) (Denmark) Tour of Scandinavia	(Denmark) Ludwig	(Netherlands) van Vleuten (20/20)	Cancelled		Not on calendar	
(France) Classic Lorient Agglomération	(Spain) García	(Netherlands) Bredewold (1/5)	(Netherlands) Bredewold (2/5)	(Netherlands) Bredewold (4/5)	(Italy) Balsamo (7/7)	
(Netherlands) Simac Ladies Tour	(Netherlands) Wiebes (7/19)	(Belgium) Kopecky (5/13)	(Belgium) Kopecky (11/13)	(Netherlands) Wiebes (16/19)	Not on calendar	
(Switzerland) Tour de Romandie Féminin	(South Africa) Moolman	(Netherlands) Vollering (11/24)	(Belgium) Kopecky (10/13)	(Switzerland) Chabbey (1/2)	Cancelled	
(China) Tour of Chongming Island	Cancelled	(Italy) Consonni	(Poland) Lach	(Netherlands) Knijnenburg	(Netherlands) Wiebes (19/19)	
(China) Tour of Guangxi	Cancelled	(Poland) Pikulik	(Spain) Alonso	(United Kingdom) Henderson	Cancelled	Not on calendar

=== Victories ===
Updated: 12 October 2026

Victories by rider
Rank	Rider	No of wins
1	Demi Vollering (NED)	24
2	Annemiek van Vleuten (NED)	20
3	Lorena Wiebes (NED)	19
4	Anna van der Breggen (NED)	17
5	Lotte Kopecky (BEL)	13
6	Elisa Longo Borghini (ITA)	12
7	Lizzie Deignan (GBR)	10
7	Marianne Vos (NED)	10
9	Marlen Reusser (SUI)	7
9	Elisa Balsamo (ITA)	7
10	Chantal van den Broek-Blaak (NED)	6
12	Jolien D'Hoore (BEL)	5
12	Katarzyna Niewiadoma (POL)	5
12	Mischa Bredewold (NED)	5
15	Marta Bastianelli (ITA)	4
15	Coryn Rivera (USA)	4
15	Kirsten Wild (NED)	4

Riders in italics are no longer active.

Victories by team
Rank	Team	No of wins	Riders
1	Team SD Worx–Protime	87	van der Breggen (16), Vollering (15), Kopecky (13), Wiebes (12), Blaak (6), Bredewold (5), Deignan (5), Guarnier (3), Reusser (3), TTT (3), Pieters (2), D'Hoore (1), Dideriksen (1), Majerus (1), Moolman (1)
2	Lidl–Trek	24	Longo Borghini (8), Balsamo (7), Deignan (5), TTT (2), Henderson (1), van Anrooij (1)
3	FDJ United–Suez	21	Vollering (9), Cavalli (2), Brown (2), Chabbey (2), Wollaston (2), Adegeest (1), Koch (1), Ludwig (1)
4	Movistar Team	16	van Vleuten (11), Reusser (4), Lloyd (1)
4	Team Picnic–PostNL	16	Wiebes (5), Rivera (4), Georgi (1), Kool (1), Labous (1), Lippert (1), TTT (1), van Dijk (1)
6	Liv AlUla Jayco	12	van Vleuten (9), Brown (1), D'Hoore (1), Spratt (1)
7	UAE Team L'Imad	11	Longo Borghini (3), Blasi (2), Bastianelli (1), Consonni (1), Fahlin (1), García (1), Hosking (1), Swinkels (1)
8	Liv Racing TeqFind	8	Vos (6), van der Breggen (1), Niewiadoma (1)
9	Visma–Lease a Bike	7	Vos (4) , Ferrand-Prévot (2), Reijnhout (1)
9	Wiggle High5	7	D'Hoore (3), Hosking (2), Longo Borghini (1), Wild (1)
11	Canyon//SRAM	4	Niewiadoma (4)
12	AG Insurance–Soudal	3	Le Court (2), Gigante (1)
12	Team Virtu Cycling	3	Bastianelli (3)
12	VolkerWessels Women Cyclingteam	3	Wiebes (2), Knijnenburg (1)
15	Hitec Products–Fluid Control	2	Becker (1), Wild (1)
15	Équipe Paule Ka	2	Lepistö (2)
15	Ceratizit Pro Cycling	2	Alonso (1), Lach (1)
15	Fenix–Premier Tech	2	Kastelijn (1), Pieterse (1)
19	EF Education–Tibco–SVB	1	Jackson (1)
19	Human Powered Health	1	Pikulik (1)
19	A.R. Monex	1	Sierra (1)
19	Born to Win BTC City Ljubljana Zhiraf	1	Bujak (1)
19	UnitedHealthcare	1	Hall (1)
19	EF Education–Oatly	1	Rüegg (1)
19	Arkéa–B&B Hotels Women	1	Claes (1)

Teams in italics are no longer active.

Victories by nation
Rank	Team	No of wins	Riders
1	Netherlands	116	Vollering (24), van Vleuten (20), Wiebes (19), van der Breggen (17), Vos (10), Blaak (6), Bredewold (5), Wild (4), Pieters (2), Adegeest (1), Kastelijn (1), Knijnenburg (1), Kool (1), Pieterse (1), Reijnhout (1), Swinkels (1), van Anrooij (1), van Dijk (1)
2	Italy	26	Longo Borghini (12), Balsamo (7), Bastianelli (4), Cavalli (2), Consonni (1)
3	Belgium	19	Kopecky (13), D'Hoore (5), Claes (1)
4	Great Britain	13	Deignan (10), Georgi (1), Henderson (1), Lloyd (1)
5	Switzerland	10	Reusser (7), Chabbey (2), Rüegg (1)
6	Australia	8	Brown (3), Hosking (3), Gigante (1), Spratt (1)
6	United States	8	Rivera (4), Guarnier (3), Hall (1)
6	Poland	8	Niewiadoma (5), Bujak (1), Pikulik (1), Lach (1)
9	Germany	5	Brennauer (2), Becker (1), Koch (1), Lippert (1)
10	France	4	Ferrand-Prévot (2), Labous (1), Cordon-Ragot (1)
10	Spain	4	Blasi (2), Alonso (1), García (1)
12	Denmark	2	Dideriksen (1), Ludwig (1)
12	Finland	2	Lepistö (2)
12	Mauritius	2	Le Court (2)
12	New Zealand	2	Wollaston (2)
16	Canada	1	Jackson (1)
16	Cuba	1	Sierra (1)
16	Luxembourg	1	Majerus (1)
16	South Africa	1	Moolman (1)
16	Sweden	1	Fahlin (1)

== Season results ==
Between 2016 and 2024, the tour contained an individual women's elite classification and youth classification, with the leader of each wearing a distinctive jersey – burgundy jersey for the individual classification and a light blue jersey for the youth classification. Since 2025, the UCI women's road world rankings, which includes points earned in races that are not part of the WorldTour, has superseded the points allocations for this series of races as the official rankings table for the sport.

=== Individual ranking ===
Year	1st		2nd		3rd	
2016	(United States) Megan Guarnier; Boels–Dolmans	946 pts	(Canada) Leah Kirchmann; Team Liv–Plantur	624 pts	(United Kingdom) Lizzie Deignan; Boels–Dolmans	545 pts
2017	(Netherlands) Anna van der Breggen; Boels–Dolmans	1016 pts	(Netherlands) Annemiek van Vleuten; Orica–Scott	989 pts	(Poland) Katarzyna Niewiadoma; WM3 Energie	856 pts
2018	(Netherlands) Annemiek van Vleuten; Mitchelton–Scott	1411.86 pts	(Netherlands) Marianne Vos; WaowDeals Pro Cycling	1394.88 pts	(Netherlands) Anna van der Breggen; Boels–Dolmans	1323.33 pts
2019	(Netherlands) Marianne Vos; CCC - Liv	1592 pts	(Netherlands) Annemiek van Vleuten; Mitchelton–Scott	1467.67 pts	(Netherlands) Lorena Wiebes; Parkhotel Valkenburg	1302.33 pts
2020	(United Kingdom) Lizzie Deignan; Trek–Segafredo	1622.33 pts	(Italy) Elisa Longo Borghini; Trek–Segafredo	1567.33 pts	(Germany) Lisa Brennauer; Ceratizit–WNT Pro Cycling	1424.67 pts
2021	(Netherlands) Annemiek van Vleuten; Movistar Team	3177 pts	(Netherlands) Demi Vollering; SD Worx	2563 pts	(Italy) Elisa Longo Borghini; Trek–Segafredo	2509 pts
2022	(Netherlands) Annemiek van Vleuten; Movistar Team	3589.33 pts	(Italy) Elisa Longo Borghini; Trek–Segafredo	2710.33 pts	(Netherlands) Demi Vollering; SD Worx	2681.17 pts
2023	(Netherlands) Demi Vollering; SD Worx	4891.86 pts	(Belgium) Lotte Kopecky; SD Worx	2735 pts	(Switzerland) Marlen Reusser; SD Worx	2512.86 pts
2024	(Belgium) Lotte Kopecky; Team SD Worx–Protime	4596 pts	(Netherlands) Demi Vollering; Team SD Worx–Protime	4183.3 pts	(Italy) Elisa Longo Borghini; Lidl–Trek	3327.1 pts
2025	Individual ranking abolished					

=== Youth ranking ===
Year	1st		2nd		3rd	
2016	(Poland) Katarzyna Niewiadoma; Rabobank-Liv Woman Cycling Team	36 pts	(Netherlands) Floortje Mackaij; Team Liv–Plantur	18 pts	(Spain) Sheyla Gutiérrez; Cylance Pro Cycling	18 pts
2017	(Denmark) Cecilie Uttrup Ludwig; Cervélo–Bigla Pro Cycling	52 pts	(United Kingdom) Alice Barnes; Drops	16 pts	(Denmark) Amalie Dideriksen; Boels–Dolmans	16 pts
2018	(Italy) Sofia Bertizzolo; Astana	42 pts	(Germany) Liane Lippert; Team Sunweb	30 pts	(Netherlands) Jeanne Korevaar; WaowDeals Pro Cycling	22 pts
2019	(Netherlands) Lorena Wiebes; Parkhotel Valkenburg	46 pts	(Italy) Marta Cavalli; Valcar–Cylance	42 pts	(Italy) Sofia Bertizzolo; Team Virtu Cycling	22 pts
2020	(Germany) Liane Lippert; Team Sunweb	28 pts	(New Zealand) Mikayla Harvey; Équipe Paule Ka	22 pts	(Netherlands) Lorena Wiebes; Team Sunweb	16 pts
2021	(New Zealand) Niamh Fisher-Black; SD Worx	34 pts	(France) Evita Muzic; FDJ Nouvelle-Aquitaine Futuroscope	32 pts	(Russia) Mariia Novolodskaia; A.R. Monex	22 pts
2022	(Netherlands) Shirin van Anrooij; Trek–Segafredo	50 pts	(New Zealand) Niamh Fisher-Black; SD Worx	34 pts	(United Kingdom) Pfeiffer Georgi; Team DSM	28 pts
2023	(Netherlands) Shirin van Anrooij; Lidl–Trek	38 pts	(Italy) Gaia Realini; Lidl–Trek	30 pts	(Netherlands) Maike van der Duin; Canyon//SRAM	22 pts
2024	(Netherlands) Shirin van Anrooij; Lidl–Trek	44 pts	(Netherlands) Puck Pieterse; Fenix–Deceuninck	36 pts	(Australia) Neve Bradbury; Canyon//SRAM	32 pts
2025	Youth ranking abolished					

=== Team ranking ===
Year	1st		2nd		3rd	
2016	(Netherlands) Boels–Dolmans	2894 pts	(United Kingdom) Wiggle High5	2245 pts	(Netherlands) Rabobank-Liv Woman Cycling Team	1853 pts
2017	(Netherlands) Boels–Dolmans	3273 pts	(Netherlands) Team Sunweb	2153 pts	(United Kingdom) Wiggle High5	1824 pts
2018	(Netherlands) Boels–Dolmans	4329.99 pts	(Australia) Mitchelton–Scott	4119.02 pts	(Germany) Team Sunweb	3321.99 pts
2019	(Netherlands) Boels–Dolmans	4045 pts	(Netherlands) Team Sunweb	2946 pts	(United States) Trek–Segafredo	2547.98 pts
2020	(United States) Trek–Segafredo	4380.98 pts	(Netherlands) Boels–Dolmans	3177.02 pts	(Netherlands) Team Sunweb	2876.98 pts
2021	(Netherlands) SD Worx	8572 pts	(United States) Trek–Segafredo	5263 pts	(Spain) Movistar Team	5043 pts
2022	(Netherlands) SD Worx	9803.02 pts	(United States) Trek–Segafredo	7998.98 pts	(Netherlands) Team DSM	7536 pts
2023	(Netherlands) SD Worx	19251.52 pts	(Germany) Canyon//SRAM	9007.22 pts	(United States) Lidl–Trek	8787.53 pts
2024	(Netherlands) Team SD Worx–Protime	14384.03 pts	(United States) Lidl–Trek	9840.98 pts	(Germany) Canyon//SRAM	7744 pts
2025	Team ranking abolished					

== Participating teams ==
As of 2026, the fourteen Women's WorldTeams were automatically invited to compete in events. Other ProTeams and Continental women's teams were invited by the organisers of each race.

=== Current UCI Women's WorldTeams (2026 season) ===
Women's WorldTeams were introduced in 2020, with teams automatically invited to World Tour events.

Team	Country	Seasons in World Tour	Became Women's WorldTeam	Previous team name
AG Insurance–Soudal	Belgium	2020–	2024	NXTG Racing (2020–2021), AG Insurance–NXTG (2022), AG Insurance–Soudal–Quick-Step (2023)
Canyon//SRAM	Germany	2016–	2020	Canyon//SRAM (2016–2024), Canyon//SRAM Zondacrypto (2025–2026)
EF Education–Oatly	United States	2024–	2026	EF Education–Cannondale (2024)
FDJ United–Suez	France	2016–	2020	Poitou-Charentes.Futuroscope.86 (2016), FDJ Nouvelle-Aquitaine Futuroscope (2017–2022), FDJ–Suez (2023–2025)
Fenix–Premier Tech	Belgium	2020–	2023	Ciclismo Mundial (2020–2021), Plantur–Pura (2022), Fenix–Deceuninck (2023–2025)
Human Powered Health	United States	2016–	2022	Rally Cycling (2016–2018, 2020–2021), Rally UHC Cycling (2019)
Lidl–Trek	United States	2019–	2020	Trek–Segafredo (2019–2023)
Liv AlUla Jayco	Australia	2016–	2020	Orica–AIS (2016), Orica–Scott (2017), Mitchelton–Scott (2018–2020), Team BikeExchange (2021), Team BikeExchange–Jayco (2022), Team Jayco–AlUla (2023)
Movistar Team	Spain	2018–	2020	
Team Picnic–PostNL	Netherlands	2016–	2020	Team Liv–Plantur (2016), Team Sunweb (2017–2020), Team DSM (2021–2023), Team dsm–firmenich PostNL (2024)
Team SD Worx–Protime	Netherlands	2016–	2021	Boels–Dolmans (2016–2020), SD Worx (2021–2023)
Visma–Lease a Bike	Netherlands	2021–	2022	Team Jumbo–Visma (2021–2023)
UAE Team L'Imad	UAE	2016–	2020	Alé–Cipollini (2016–2019), Alé BTC Ljubljana (2020–2021), UAE Team ADQ (2022–2026)
Uno-X Mobility	Norway	2022–	2022	

=== Current UCI Women's ProTeams (2026 season) ===
UCI Women's ProTeams were introduced for the 2026 season, creating a structure similar to that of the men's teams.

Team	Country	Seasons in World Tour	Became Women's ProTeam	Previous team name
Cofidis	France	2022–	2025	
Laboral Kutxa–Fundación Euskadi	Spain	2021–	2025	
Lotto–Intermarché Ladies	Belgium	2023–	2026	Lotto–Belisol Ladiesteam (2006–2009, 2012–2014), Lotto Ladies Team (2010–2011), Lotto–Soudal Ladies (2015–2022), Lotto–Dstny Ladies (2023–2024), Lotto Ladies (2025)
Ma Petite Entreprise	France	2026–	2026	
Mayenne Monbana My Pie	France	2019–	2026	Charente-Maritime Women Cycling (2019–2020), Stade Rochelais Charente-Maritime (2021–2023), Winspace (2024), Winspace Orange Seal (2025)
St. Michel–Preference Home–Auber93	France	2022–	2025	St. Michel–Auber93 (2022–2023)
VolkerWessels Women Cyclingteam	Netherlands	2016–	2025	Parkhotel Valkenburg Continental Team (2016), Parkhotel Valkenburg–Destil (2017), Parkhotel Valkenburg (2018–2023)

=== Former UCI WorldTeams ===
Teams in italic are no longer active.

Team	Country	Seasons in World Tour	Became Women's WorldTeam	Previous team name
Liv Racing TeqFind	Netherlands	2016–2023	2020	Rabobank-Liv Woman Cycling Team (2016), WM3 Energie (2017) WaowDeals Pro Cycling (2018), CCC - Liv (2019–2020) Liv Racing (2021), Liv Racing Xstra (2022)
EF Education–Tibco–SVB	United States	2016–2023	2022	Tibco–Silicon Valley Bank (2016–2021)
Roland Le Dévoluy	Switzerland	2018–2025	2022	Cogeas–Mettler Pro Cycling Team (2018), Cogeas–Mettler–Look (2019–2021), Roland Cogeas Edelweiss Squad (2022), Israel Premier Tech Roland (2023)
Ceratizit Pro Cycling	Germany	2017–2025	2024	Team WNT (2017), WNT–Rotor Pro Cycling (2018–2019), Ceratizit–WNT Pro Cycling (2020–2024)

== See also ==
- UCI race classifications
