= 2023 La Vuelta Femenina, Stage 1 to Stage 7 =

15th event in the 2023 UCI Women's World Tour

The 2023 La Vuelta Femenina (officially La Vuelta Femenina by Carrefour.es) was the first edition of La Vuelta Femenina, a cycling stage race which takes place in Spain. The race took place from 1 to 7 May 2023, and was the 15th event in the 2023 UCI Women's World Tour.

== Overview ==
Stage characteristics
Stage	Date	Course	Distance	Type	Winner
1	1 May	Torrevieja	14.5 km (9.0 mi)	Team time trial	Team Jumbo–Visma
2	2 May	Orihuela to Pilar de la Horadada	105.8 km (65.7 mi)	Flat stage	Charlotte Kool (NED)
3	3 May	Elche de la Sierra to La Roda	158 km (98 mi)	Flat stage	Marianne Vos (NED)
4	4 May	Cuenca to Guadalajara	133.1 km (82.7 mi)	Hilly stage	Marianne Vos (NED)
5	5 May	La Cabrera to Mirador de Peñas Llanas, Riaza	129.2 km (80.3 mi)	Mountain stage	Demi Vollering (NED)
6	6 May	Castro Urdiales to Laredo	106.7 km (66.3 mi)	Medium-mountain stage	Gaia Realini (ITA)
7	7 May	Pola de Siero to Lagos de Covadonga	93.7 km (58.2 mi)	Mountain stage	Demi Vollering (NED)
Total			741 km (460 mi)		

== Classification standings ==
Legend
Denotes the leader of the general classification	Denotes the leader of the team classification
Denotes the leader of the points classification	Denotes the winner of the combativity award
Denotes the leader of the mountains classification	

== Stage 1 ==
1 May 2023 — Torrevieja, 14.5 km (9.0 mi) (TTT)

The first stage of the inaugural edition of La Vuelta Femenina featured a team time trial (TTT) with a length of 14.5 kilometres (9.0 mi) on the streets of Torrevieja. The course was described as "straightforward", with media noting the rarity of team time trials in the UCI Women's World Tour.

The Sopela Women's Team was the first team off the start ramp, one of nine Spanish teams in the race. Liv Racing TeqFind was the first team to set a time faster than 19 minutes, with Team Jayco–AlUla then beating that time by 11 seconds. The fifteenth team to start was Team Jumbo–Visma, with four of their riders (led by Briton Anna Henderson) setting a time over 30 seconds faster than Jayco–AlUla. None of the eight teams remaining were able to better this time, with Canyon–SRAM getting the closest, setting a time just 1 second slower.

Jumbo–Visma, therefore, won the stage, with Henderson taking the red jersey as the race leader. Amongst the GC contenders, Kasia Niewiadoma (Canyon–SRAM) was the fastest, eight and eleven seconds ahead of Gaia Realini (Trek–Segafredo) and Annemiek van Vleuten (Movistar Team), respectively. The rest of the potential contenders finished within 40 seconds of Jumbo–Visma.

Stage 1 result
Rank	Team	Time
1	(Netherlands) Team Jumbo–Visma	18' 03"
2	(Germany) Canyon//SRAM	+ 1"
3	(United States) Trek–Segafredo	+ 9"
4	(Spain) Movistar Team	+ 12"
5	(Netherlands) SD Worx	+ 14"
6	(France) FDJ–Suez	+ 25"
7	(Netherlands) Team DSM	+ 25"
8	(Australia) Team Jayco–AlUla	+ 31"
9	(United Arab Emirates) UAE Team ADQ	+ 41"
10	(Netherlands) Liv Racing TeqFind	+ 42"

General classification after stage 1
Rank	Rider	Team	Time
1	Anna Henderson (GBR)	Team Jumbo–Visma	18' 03"
2	Amber Kraak (NED)	Team Jumbo–Visma	+ 0"
3	Marianne Vos (NED)	Team Jumbo–Visma	+ 0"
4	Riejanne Markus (NED)	Team Jumbo–Visma	+ 0"
5	Chloé Dygert (USA)	Canyon//SRAM	+ 1"
6	Agnieszka Skalniak-Sójka (POL)	Canyon//SRAM	+ 1"
7	Katarzyna Niewiadoma (POL)	Canyon//SRAM	+ 1"
8	Elise Chabbey (SUI)	Canyon//SRAM	+ 1"
9	Ricarda Bauernfeind (GER)	Canyon//SRAM	+ 1"
10	Lizzie Deignan (GBR)	Trek–Segafredo	+ 9"

== Stage 2 ==
2 May 2023 — Orihuela to Pilar de la Horadada, 105.8 km (65.7 mi)

The second stage took the riders from Orihuela to Pilar de la Horadada over a mostly flat course, with the fourth-category climb of Puerto de Rebate (7.6km at 1.2%) located inside the last 20 kilometres.

Early in the stage, a four-rider breakaway formed, eventually gaining over a minute on the peloton. However, fear of crosswinds meant that the peloton chased and caught the majority of the break with around 50 kilometres remaining. In light of the closeness of the GC, the bonus seconds available at the intermediate sprint were highly fought over. Femke Markus (SD Worx) took six bonus seconds as first across the line, and her sister Riejanne Markus (Team Jumbo–Visma) took the virtual GC lead after claiming four bonus seconds.

Jade Wiel (FDJ–Suez) took the single point available at the top of the Puerto de Rebate, taking the first polka-dot jersey as the leader of the Queen of the Mountains (QoM) classification. The peloton reformed heading into the finish at Pilar de la Horadada, anticipating a bunch sprint. In the final sprint, Chloé Dygert (Canyon–SRAM) gained a gap after attacking with around 500 metres. Marianne Vos (Team Jumbo–Visma) gave chase, catching up to Dygert with around 100 metres to go – however, Charlotte Kool (Team DSM) used Vos' slipstream to outsprint both riders to win the stage.

Vos took the red GC jersey thanks to the 6 bonus seconds available at the finish line, with fifty-one riders within a minute of the GC lead. Kool took the lead of the points classification following her stage victory.

Stage 2 Result
Rank	Rider	Team	Time
1	Charlotte Kool (NED)	Team DSM	2h 41' 27"
2	Marianne Vos (NED)	Team Jumbo–Visma	+ 0"
3	Chloé Dygert (USA)	Canyon//SRAM	+ 0"
4	Blanka Vas (HUN)	SD Worx	+ 0"
5	Rachele Barbieri (ITA)	Liv Racing TeqFind	+ 0"
6	Alba Teruel (ESP)	Laboral Kutxa–Fundación Euskadi	+ 0"
7	Demi Vollering (NED)	SD Worx	+ 0"
8	Nina Kessler (NED)	Team Jayco–AlUla	+ 0"
9	Anna Henderson (GBR)	Team Jumbo–Visma	+ 0"
10	Clara Copponi (FRA)	FDJ–Suez	+ 0"

General classification after Stage 2
Rank	Rider	Team	Time
1	Marianne Vos (NED)	Team Jumbo–Visma	2h 59' 24"
2	Chloé Dygert (USA)	Canyon//SRAM	+ 1"
3	Riejanne Markus (NED)	Team Jumbo–Visma	+ 2"
4	Anna Henderson (GBR)	Team Jumbo–Visma	+ 6"
5	Amber Kraak (NED)	Team Jumbo–Visma	+ 6"
6	Katarzyna Niewiadoma (POL)	Canyon//SRAM	+ 7"
7	Elise Chabbey (SUI)	Canyon//SRAM	+ 7"
8	Ricarda Bauernfeind (GER)	Canyon//SRAM	+ 7"
9	Amanda Spratt (AUS)	Trek–Segafredo	+ 15"
10	Agnieszka Skalniak-Sójka (POL)	Canyon//SRAM	+ 15"

== Stage 3 ==
3 May 2023 — Elche de la Sierra to La Roda, 158 km (98 mi)

The third stage of the race was the longest of the race, taking the riders from Elche de la Sierra to La Roda over a flat course with no QoM points available.

A headwind ensured that no breakaways formed in the first 60 kilometres. However, with around 100 kilometres to go, the course turned and tail-crosswinds began to affect the riders. Movistar worked with Jumbo–Visma to cause a split, with Kristen Faulkner (Team Jayco–AlUla), Marta Cavalli (FDJ–Suez) and Trek–Segafredo teammates Amanda Spratt, Lizzie Deignan and Gaia Realini falling on the wrong side. The gap between the groups grew to around a minute with 60 kilometres remaining. The front peloton had around 50 riders, and teams worked together to ensure a high pace to maximise damage.

The high pace led by Team DSM then caused another split, dropping Évita Muzic (FDJ–Suez) and Silvia Persico (UAE Team ADQ) among others. At the intermediate sprint with around 20 kilometres to go, Marianne Vos took the points at the head of the front group, with Persico's group around 25 seconds back and the group led by Trek–Segafredo a further minute behind. Entering the final kilometre, only 29 riders remained in the front group.

In the final sprint, Vos took the stage win, beating Kool and Dygert in the sprint finish. Vos retained her lead in the GC and Points classifications, with Wiel retaining her polka-dot jersey owing to the lack of QoM points available. The crosswinds had caused substantial damage to some GC riders hopes, with Persico losing 1' 32" of time and Trek–Segafredo riders (including Realini) losing 2' 41". The stage had been the fastest UCI Women's World Tour race ever, at an average speed of 45.6 kilometres per hour (28.3 mph).

Stage 3 Result
Rank	Rider	Team	Time
1	Marianne Vos (NED)	Team Jumbo–Visma	3h 27' 38"
2	Charlotte Kool (NED)	Team DSM	+ 0"
3	Chloé Dygert (USA)	Canyon//SRAM	+ 0"
4	Clara Copponi (FRA)	FDJ–Suez	+ 0"
5	Emma Norsgaard (DEN)	Movistar Team	+ 0"
6	Tamara Dronova	Israel Premier Tech Roland	+ 0"
7	Liane Lippert (GER)	Movistar Team	+ 0"
8	Alba Teruel (ESP)	Laboral Kutxa–Fundación Euskadi	+ 0"
9	Demi Vollering (NED)	SD Worx	+ 0"
10	Marlen Reusser (SUI)	SD Worx	+ 0"

General classification after Stage 3
Rank	Rider	Team	Time
1	Marianne Vos (NED)	Team Jumbo–Visma	6h 26' 46"
2	Chloé Dygert (USA)	Canyon//SRAM	+ 13"
3	Riejanne Markus (NED)	Team Jumbo–Visma	+ 14"
4	Anna Henderson (GBR)	Team Jumbo–Visma	+ 22"
5	Amber Kraak (NED)	Team Jumbo–Visma	+ 22"
6	Elise Chabbey (SUI)	Canyon//SRAM	+ 23"
7	Katarzyna Niewiadoma (POL)	Canyon//SRAM	+ 23"
8	Liane Lippert (GER)	Movistar Team	+ 32"
9	Emma Norsgaard (DEN)	Movistar Team	+ 34"
10	Annemiek van Vleuten (NED)	Movistar Team	+ 34"

== Stage 4 ==
4 May 2023 — Cuenca to Guadalajara, 133.1 km (82.7 mi)

The fourth stage took the riders further north, with a hilly stage from Cuenca to Guadalajara with a third-category climb (Alto de Horche, 4km at 4.9%) located 12 kilometres from the finish.

The hilly course lent itself to a breakaway, with a group gaining nearly 4 minutes. However, the fast pace set by Jumbo–Visma in the peloton behind meant that it was no threat to the peloton. Some riders (such as Olympic champion Anna Kiesenhofer of Israel Premier Tech Roland) attempted to escape prior to Alto de Horche, the single-categorised climb of the day, however, all these attempts were caught prior to the bottom of the climb.

On the climb, Movistar led the pace, causing Cavalli to be dropped. At the top of the climb, Elise Chabbey (Canyon–SRAM) took the QoM points, with Annemiek van Vleuten immediately attacking into the descent, with around 10 kilometres to the finish. She was immediately followed by her main GC rival Demi Vollering (SD Worx). A collection of attacks from GC contenders and counterattacks from the peloton followed, however, all of these were caught by the peloton with around three kilometres remaining.

In the final bunch sprint, Marlen Reusser (SD Worx) attacked with 500 metres to go, with Dygert following her. Vos in the red leader jersey then attacked, overtaking them both to take the stage win. Emma Norsgaard (Team Movistar) took second in Vos' slipstream, with Reusser taking third place. Vos extended her lead in the GC classification to 13 seconds, thanks to the bonus seconds available on the finish line. She also retained her lead in the points classification. Chabbey took the polka-dot jersey of the QoM classification.

Stage 4 Result
Rank	Rider	Team	Time
1	Marianne Vos (NED)	Team Jumbo–Visma	3h 26' 24"
2	Emma Norsgaard (DEN)	Movistar Team	+ 0"
3	Marlen Reusser (SUI)	SD Worx	+ 0"
4	Blanka Vas (HUN)	SD Worx	+ 0"
5	Annemiek van Vleuten (NED)	Movistar Team	+ 0"
6	Lizzie Deignan (GBR)	Trek–Segafredo	+ 0"
7	Elise Chabbey (SUI)	Canyon//SRAM	+ 0"
8	Silvia Persico (ITA)	UAE Team ADQ	+ 0"
9	Chloé Dygert (USA)	Canyon//SRAM	+ 0"
10	Tamara Dronova	Israel Premier Tech Roland	+ 0"

General classification after Stage 4
Rank	Rider	Team	Time
1	Marianne Vos (NED)	Team Jumbo–Visma	9h 53' 14"
2	Chloé Dygert (USA)	Canyon//SRAM	+ 13"
3	Riejanne Markus (NED)	Team Jumbo–Visma	+ 14"
4	Amber Kraak (NED)	Team Jumbo–Visma	+ 18"
5	Elise Chabbey (SUI)	Canyon//SRAM	+ 19"
6	Katarzyna Niewiadoma (POL)	Canyon//SRAM	+ 19"
7	Emma Norsgaard (DEN)	Movistar Team	+ 24"
8	Marlen Reusser (SUI)	SD Worx	+ 28"
9	Annemiek van Vleuten (NED)	Movistar Team	+ 30"
10	Liane Lippert (GER)	Movistar Team	+ 30"

== Stage 5 ==
5 May 2023 — La Cabrera to Mirador de Peñas Llanas, Riaza, 129.2 km (80.3 mi)

The fifth stage was the first mountain stage of the race, taking riders from La Cabrera to Mirador de Peñas Llanas, Riaza. Two categorised climbs featured in the stage – the first-category Puerto de Navafría (11.5km at 5.8%), with the stage finishing at the top of the second-category Mirador de Peñas Llanas (5km at 6.7%).

The start of the first-category Puerto de Navafría climb was reached after just 40 kilometres, with an early breakaway caught by the peloton on the climb. The peloton then split, dropping the red jersey of Marianne Vos, as well as Niewiadoma and Persico. At the top of the climb, Élise Chabbey took more QoM points to extend her lead in the mountains classification. The Vos group was over two and a half minutes back.

The gap gradually reduced to just 30 seconds, however, the connection was not made prior to the bottom of the final climb, Mirador de Peñas Llanas. Gaia Realini led the front group, as riders gradually dropped off leaving a group of just 15 riders. After three kilometres of ascending, Demi Vollering took over from Realini and increased the pace – with only Annemiek van Vleuten and Ricarda Bauernfeind (Canyon–SRAM) able to keep up.

In the final kilometre, van Vleuten attacked on the steepest section of the climb, however, a counterattack by Vollering allowed her to win the stage by 3 seconds. Van Vleuten was second, with Bauernfeind third. Vollering therefore took the lead in the GC, with a 5-second lead over van Vleuten. Riejanne Markus (Team Jumbo-Visma) was third, 12 seconds behind Vollering. Chabbey retained her lead in the QoM classification (as well as moving up to 4th place overall), and Vos retained the green points classification jersey.

Stage 5 Result
Rank	Rider	Team	Time
1	Demi Vollering (NED)	SD Worx	3h 33' 25"
2	Annemiek van Vleuten (NED)	Movistar Team	+ 3"
3	Ricarda Bauernfeind (GER)	Canyon//SRAM	+ 9"
4	Évita Muzic (FRA)	FDJ–Suez	+ 13"
5	Gaia Realini (ITA)	Trek–Segafredo	+ 27"
6	Elise Chabbey (SUI)	Canyon//SRAM	+ 30"
7	Riejanne Markus (NED)	Team Jumbo–Visma	+ 30"
8	Juliette Labous (FRA)	Team DSM	+ 30"
9	Olivia Baril (CAN)	UAE Team ADQ	+ 30"
10	Mavi García (ESP)	Liv Racing TeqFind	+ 50"

General classification after Stage 5
Rank	Rider	Team	Time
1	Demi Vollering (NED)	SD Worx	13h 27' 01"
2	Annemiek van Vleuten (NED)	Movistar Team	+ 5"
3	Riejanne Markus (NED)	Team Jumbo–Visma	+ 12"
4	Elise Chabbey (SUI)	Canyon//SRAM	+ 27"
5	Juliette Labous (FRA)	Team DSM	+ 51"
6	Marlen Reusser (SUI)	SD Worx	+ 1' 00"
7	Olivia Baril (CAN)	UAE Team ADQ	+ 1' 07"
8	Katarzyna Niewiadoma (POL)	Canyon//SRAM	+ 1' 27"
9	Mavi García (ESP)	Liv Racing TeqFind	+ 1' 28"
10	Erica Magnaldi (ITA)	UAE Team ADQ	+ 1' 28"

== Stage 6 ==
6 May 2023 — Castro Urdiales to Laredo, 106.7 km (66.3 mi)

Following a transfer to Spain's northern coast, the sixth stage of the race took the riders from Castro Urdiales to Laredo over a hilly course. It featured two categorised climbs – the second-category Alto de Fuente de las Varas (6.4km at 5.4%) and the second-category Puerto de Campo el Hayal (8.2km at 4.6%).

The key moment of the stage occurred just 35 kilometres into the stage when race leader Demi Vollering (SD Worx) and some of her teammates opted to take a nature break – at the beginning of a crosswind section where Movistar had planned to attack. A large gap of over a minute quickly opened up, with SD Worx unable to catch the leading group prior to the first climb.

On the Alto de Fuente de las Varas climb, Annemiek van Vleuten set a fast pace. Only 4 riders (including Gaia Realini of Trek–Segafredo and Évita Muzic of FDJ–Suez) were able to stay with her. The gap to the red jersey and her teammates doubled to nearly 2 minutes. At the subsequent intermediate sprint, Van Vleuten attacked, taking the six bonus seconds available – and only Realini was able to follow.

The pair rode together over the next climb – the second-category Puerto de Campo el Hayal – and descended towards the finish in Laredo. In the meantime, Vollering and her teammates chased hard to regain lost time, eventually joining the main chasing group.

At the finish in Laredo, Realini and van Vleuten sprinted for the stage victory, with the result being too close to call. After some confusion, a photo finish declared Realini the winner of the stage, the first UCI Women's World Tour victory of her career. The chase group crossed the line 1' 04" behind the pair, containing Vollering and other GC contenders such as Niewiadoma, Muzic, Mavi García (Liv Racing TeqFind) and Juliette Labous (Team DSM).

In the GC, van Vleuten took the red jersey, with Vollering 1' 11" behind and Markus 12 seconds further back. Van Vleuten also took the lead in the QoM classification, with Vos retaining the points classification jersey. Following the stage, SD Worx accused other teams of "capitalizing on a toilet break" while their riders were stopped, with Movistar explaining that they had always planned to attack at that particular section. Vollering noted that she was "hungry for revenge" on the final stage to Lagos de Covadonga.

Stage 6 Result
Rank	Rider	Team	Time
1	Gaia Realini (ITA)	Trek–Segafredo	2h 49' 23"
2	Annemiek van Vleuten (NED)	Movistar Team	+ 0"
3	Loes Adegeest (NED)	FDJ–Suez	+ 1' 04"
4	Silvia Persico (ITA)	UAE Team ADQ	+ 1' 04"
5	Demi Vollering (NED)	SD Worx	+ 1' 04"
6	Mavi García (ESP)	Liv Racing TeqFind	+ 1' 04"
7	Évita Muzic (FRA)	FDJ–Suez	+ 1' 04"
8	Katarzyna Niewiadoma (POL)	Canyon//SRAM	+ 1' 04"
9	Riejanne Markus (NED)	Team Jumbo–Visma	+ 1' 04"
10	Ane Santesteban (ESP)	Team Jayco–AlUla	+ 1' 04"

General classification after Stage 6
Rank	Rider	Team	Time
1	Annemiek van Vleuten (NED)	Movistar Team	16h 16' 17"
2	Demi Vollering (NED)	SD Worx	+ 1' 11"
3	Riejanne Markus (NED)	Team Jumbo–Visma	+ 1' 23"
4	Juliette Labous (FRA)	Team DSM	+ 1' 58"
5	Marlen Reusser (SUI)	SD Worx	+ 2' 11"
6	Olivia Baril (CAN)	UAE Team ADQ	+ 2' 18"
7	Katarzyna Niewiadoma (POL)	Canyon//SRAM	+ 2' 38"
8	Mavi García (ESP)	Liv Racing TeqFind	+ 2' 39"
9	Erica Magnaldi (ITA)	UAE Team ADQ	+ 2' 39"
10	Ricarda Bauernfeind (GER)	Canyon//SRAM	+ 2' 45"

== Stage 7 ==
7 May 2023 — Pola de Siero to Lagos de Covadonga, 93.7 km (58.2 mi)

The final stage of the race took the riders from Pola de Siero to Lagos de Covadonga. It featured two climbs, the second-category La Colada Moandi (12.5km at 4.6%), with a mountain finish at the top of the "category H" climb of Lagos de Covadonga (12.5km at 6.9%).

An early breakaway was caught before the first climb of the day, the second-category La Colada Moandi. On the climb, SD Worx set a high pace so that by the top of the climb only 14 remained. However, this group included key contenders including Demi Vollering, Annemiek Van Vleuten, Gaia Realini, Kasia Niewiadoma, Silvia Persico, Mavi García and Évita Muzic.

On the descent, Marlen Reusser and Loes Adegeest (FDJ–Suez) were able to rejoin, and Reusser then worked with Niewiadoma to establish a break. This grew to over a minute as dropped riders caught up to the front group. Prior to the final climb of Lagos de Covadonga, Movistar and Jumbo-Visma worked to catch the pair.

Starting the climb, Movistar led the pace in defence of the red jersey-wearing van Vleuten, however, Vollering then took over at the head of the race – quickly dropping all but 7 riders. The strong pace by Vollering continued up the climb, with Realini and van Vleuten following her as more riders were dropped. On the steeper parts of the climb, attacks by Realini caused van Vleuten to be dropped. Through the mist at the top of the climb, Vollering continued to push to the top, needing to beat van Vleuten by 1' 12" to take the GC win.

Realini was dropped on a short descent in the last kilometre, and Vollering rode solo to take the stage win at the summit. Realini finished 11 seconds behind Vollering, however, van Vleuten emerged from the mist to cross the line 56 seconds after Vollering, taking the overall victory by just 9 seconds. As well as third place overall, Realini had taken the QoM classification. Riejanne Markus took fourth place overall, with strong performances by Ricarda Bauernfeind and Évita Muzic on the stage elevating them to 5th and 6th place overall.

In the final general classification, Annemiek van Vleuten (Movistar Team) won the La Vuelta Femenina ahead of Demi Vollering (SD Worx) by just 9 seconds while Gaia Realini was third at over two and a half minutes down. Vollering did retain the UCI Women's World Tour leaders jersey. Van Vleuten's victory made her the first woman to win all three of the major stage races in women's cycling (La Vuelta Femenina, Tour de France Femmes and Giro Donne). Realini won the mountains classification while Marianne Vos (Team Jumbo–Visma) won the points classification. The team classification was won by UAE Team ADQ as the team with the lowest aggregate time among their three best-placed riders. Out of 161 starters, 127 finished the event.

Stage 7 Result
Rank	Rider	Team	Time
1	Demi Vollering (NED)	SD Worx	2h 43' 02"
2	Gaia Realini (ITA)	Trek–Segafredo	+ 11"
3	Annemiek van Vleuten (NED)	Movistar Team	+ 56"
4	Évita Muzic (FRA)	FDJ–Suez	+ 1' 59"
5	Ricarda Bauernfeind (GER)	Canyon//SRAM	+ 2' 00"
6	Erica Magnaldi (ITA)	UAE Team ADQ	+ 2' 59"
7	Riejanne Markus (NED)	Team Jumbo–Visma	+ 3' 05"
8	Alena Ivanchenko	UAE Team ADQ	+ 3' 12"
9	Juliette Labous (FRA)	Team DSM	+ 3' 21"
10	Marta Cavalli (ITA)	FDJ–Suez	+ 3' 40"

General classification after Stage 7
Rank	Rider	Team	Time
1	Annemiek van Vleuten (NED)	Movistar Team	19h 00' 11"
2	Demi Vollering (NED)	SD Worx	+ 9"
3	Gaia Realini (ITA)	Trek–Segafredo	+ 2' 41"
4	Riejanne Markus (NED)	Team Jumbo–Visma	+ 3' 36"
5	Ricarda Bauernfeind (GER)	Canyon//SRAM	+ 3' 53"
6	Évita Muzic (FRA)	FDJ–Suez	+ 4' 24"
7	Juliette Labous (FRA)	Team DSM	+ 4' 27"
8	Erica Magnaldi (ITA)	UAE Team ADQ	+ 4' 46"
9	Mavi García (ESP)	Liv Racing TeqFind	+ 6' 31"
10	Katarzyna Niewiadoma (POL)	Canyon//SRAM	+ 7' 22"
