= 2023 Giro Donne, Stage 1 to Stage 9 =

Cycling race stages

The 2023 Giro Donne was the 34th edition of the Giro Donne, a women's road cycling stage race that took place in Italy. The race began on the 30 June and ended on 9 July 2023. It was the 20th race in the 2023 UCI Women's World Tour calendar.

== Overview ==
Stage characteristics
Stage	Date	Course	Distance	Type	Winner
1	30 June	Chianciano	4.4 km (2.7 mi)	Individual time trial	Stage neutralised (Note: Stage 1 was neutralised due to a thunderstorm and flooded roads)
2	1 July	Bagno a Ripoli to Marradi	102.1 km (63.4 mi)	Medium-mountain stage	Annemiek van Vleuten (NED)
3	2 July	Formigine to Modena	118.2 km (73.4 mi)	Flat stage	Lorena Wiebes (NED)
4	3 July	Fidenza to Borgo Val di Taro	134 km (83 mi)	Hilly stage	Elisa Longo Borghini (ITA)
5	4 July	Salassa to Ceres	103.3 km (64.2 mi)	Mountain stage	Antonia Niedermaier (GER)
6	5 July	Canelli to Canelli	104.4 km (64.9 mi)	Hilly stage	Annemiek van Vleuten (NED)
7	6 July	Albenga to Alassio	109.1 km (67.8 mi)	Hilly stage	Annemiek van Vleuten (NED)
	7 July	Transfer to Sardinia			
8	8 July	Nuoro to Sassari	125.7 km (78.1 mi)	Hilly stage	Blanka Vas (HUN)
9	9 July	Sassari to Olbia	126.8 km (78.8 mi)	Medium-mountain stage	Chiara Consonni (ITA)
Total			928 km (577 mi)		

== Classification standings ==
Legend
Denotes the leader of the general classification	Denotes the leader of the mountains classification
Denotes the leader of the points classification	Denotes the leader of the young rider classification
Denotes the leader of the Italian rider classification	Denotes the winner of the team classification

== Stage 1 ==
30 June 2023 — Chianciano, 4.4 km (2.7 mi) (ITT)

The first stage of the 2023 Giro d'Italia Donne featured an individual time trial (ITT) with a length of 4.4 kilometres (2.7 mi) around Chianciano Terme in Tuscany. Heavy rain and thunderstorms affected the stage, with multiple riders crashing including Mavi Garcia and Chloé Dygert of Canyon–SRAM - with Dygert still managing to set the fastest time. 2022 winner van Vleuten then beat Dygert, before the organisers called for a pause due to the weather. Resuming around 20 minutes later, Letizia Paternoster of Team Jayco-AlUla then beat van Vleuten's time by five-hundredths of a second.

With over 100 riders remaining, the organisers paused the stage again due to standing water on the roads and full storm drains. The stage was eventually cancelled on the grounds of rider safety using the Extreme Weather Protocol. van Vlueten called the stage "a lottery" and that it was good that the stage had been cancelled.

All times set were disregarded, and no classification jerseys were awarded. The race therefore started on stage 2 on Saturday 1 July.

== Stage 2 ==
1 July 2023 — Bagno a Ripoli to Marradi, 102.1 km (63.4 mi)

Stage 2 Result
Rank	Rider	Team	Time
1	Annemiek van Vleuten (NED)	Movistar Team	2h 40' 06"
2	Cecilie Uttrup Ludwig (DEN)	FDJ–Suez	+ 45"
3	Juliette Labous (FRA)	Team dsm–firmenich	+ 45"
4	Elisa Longo Borghini (ITA)	Lidl–Trek	+ 45"
5	Ane Santesteban (ESP)	Team Jayco–AlUla	+ 45"
6	Mavi García (ESP)	Liv Racing TeqFind	+ 45"
7	Marta Cavalli (ITA)	FDJ–Suez	+ 45"
8	Erica Magnaldi (ITA)	UAE Team ADQ	+ 45"
9	Veronica Ewers (USA)	EF Education–Tibco–SVB	+ 45"
10	Évita Muzic (FRA)	FDJ–Suez	+ 49"

General classification after Stage 2
Rank	Rider	Team	Time
1	Annemiek van Vleuten (NED)	Movistar Team	2h 39' 56"
2	Cecilie Uttrup Ludwig (DEN)	FDJ–Suez	+ 49"
3	Juliette Labous (FRA)	Team dsm–firmenich	+ 51"
4	Elisa Longo Borghini (ITA)	Lidl–Trek	+ 55"
5	Ane Santesteban (ESP)	Team Jayco–AlUla	+ 55"
6	Mavi García (ESP)	Liv Racing TeqFind	+ 55"
7	Marta Cavalli (ITA)	FDJ–Suez	+ 55"
8	Erica Magnaldi (ITA)	UAE Team ADQ	+ 55"
9	Veronica Ewers (USA)	EF Education–Tibco–SVB	+ 55"
10	Évita Muzic (FRA)	FDJ–Suez	+ 59"

== Stage 3 ==
2 July 2023 — Formigine to Modena, 118.2 km (73.4 mi)

The third stage was neutralised at 1 kilometre (0.62 mi) from the finish line for safety reasons. Times for the general classification were taken from that point, and the stage had no time bonuses.

Stage 3 Result
Rank	Rider	Team	Time
1	Lorena Wiebes (NED)	SD Worx	2h 52' 33"
2	Marianne Vos (NED)	Team Jumbo–Visma	+ 0"
3	Chloé Dygert (USA)	Canyon//SRAM	+ 0"
4	Megan Jastrab (USA)	Team dsm–firmenich	+ 0"
5	Rachele Barbieri (ITA)	Liv Racing TeqFind	+ 0"
6	Georgia Baker (AUS)	Team Jayco–AlUla	+ 0"
7	Daria Pikulik (POL)	Human Powered Health	+ 0"
8	Chiara Consonni (ITA)	UAE Team ADQ	+ 0"
9	Amalie Dideriksen (DEN)	Uno-X Pro Cycling Team	+ 0"
10	Silvia Zanardi (ITA)	Bepink	+ 0"

General classification after Stage 3
Rank	Rider	Team	Time
1	Annemiek van Vleuten (NED)	Movistar Team	5h 32' 29"
2	Cecilie Uttrup Ludwig (DEN)	FDJ–Suez	+ 49"
3	Juliette Labous (FRA)	Team dsm–firmenich	+ 51"
4	Mavi García (ESP)	Liv Racing TeqFind	+ 55"
5	Elisa Longo Borghini (ITA)	Lidl–Trek	+ 55"
6	Veronica Ewers (USA)	EF Education–Tibco–SVB	+ 55"
7	Ane Santesteban (ESP)	Team Jayco–AlUla	+ 55"
8	Marta Cavalli (ITA)	FDJ–Suez	+ 55"
9	Erica Magnaldi (ITA)	UAE Team ADQ	+ 55"
10	Gaia Realini (ITA)	Lidl–Trek	+ 59"

== Stage 4 ==
3 July 2023 — Fidenza to Borgo Val di Taro, 134 km (83 mi)

Stage 4 Result
Rank	Rider	Team	Time
1	Elisa Longo Borghini (ITA)	Lidl–Trek	3h 33' 08"
2	Veronica Ewers (USA)	EF Education–Tibco–SVB	+ 0"
3	Annemiek van Vleuten (NED)	Movistar Team	+ 0"
4	Lorena Wiebes (NED)	SD Worx	+ 40"
5	Marianne Vos (NED)	Team Jumbo–Visma	+ 40"
6	Chloé Dygert (USA)	Canyon//SRAM	+ 40"
7	Silvia Persico (ITA)	UAE Team ADQ	+ 40"
8	Ruby Roseman-Gannon (AUS)	Team Jayco–AlUla	+ 40"
9	Fem van Empel (NED)	Team Jumbo–Visma	+ 40"
10	Anouska Koster (NED)	Uno-X Pro Cycling Team	+ 40"

General classification after Stage 4
Rank	Rider	Team	Time
1	Annemiek van Vleuten (NED)	Movistar Team	9h 05' 33"
2	Elisa Longo Borghini (ITA)	Lidl–Trek	+ 49"
3	Veronica Ewers (USA)	EF Education–Tibco–SVB	+ 53"
4	Cecilie Uttrup Ludwig (DEN)	FDJ–Suez	+ 1' 33"
5	Juliette Labous (FRA)	Team dsm–firmenich	+ 1' 35"
6	Mavi García (ESP)	Liv Racing TeqFind	+ 1' 39"
7	Ane Santesteban (ESP)	Team Jayco–AlUla	+ 1' 39"
8	Marta Cavalli (ITA)	FDJ–Suez	+ 1' 39"
9	Erica Magnaldi (ITA)	UAE Team ADQ	+ 1' 43"
10	Gaia Realini (ITA)	Lidl–Trek	+ 1' 43"

== Stage 5 ==
4 July 2023 — Salassa to Ceres, 103.3 km (64.2 mi)

Stage 5 Result
Rank	Rider	Team	Time
1	Antonia Niedermaier (GER)	Canyon//SRAM	3h 14' 02"
2	Annemiek van Vleuten (NED)	Movistar Team	+ 9"
3	Niamh Fisher-Black (NZL)	SD Worx	+ 1' 26"
4	Juliette Labous (FRA)	Team dsm–firmenich	+ 1' 26"
5	Veronica Ewers (USA)	EF Education–Tibco–SVB	+ 1' 26"
6	Gaia Realini (ITA)	Lidl–Trek	+ 1' 32"
7	Mavi García (ESP)	Liv Racing TeqFind	+ 2' 01"
8	Erica Magnaldi (ITA)	UAE Team ADQ	+ 2' 01"
9	Fem van Empel (NED)	Team Jumbo–Visma	+ 2' 54"
10	Silvia Persico (ITA)	UAE Team ADQ	+ 2' 54"

General classification after Stage 5
Rank	Rider	Team	Time
1	Annemiek van Vleuten (NED)	Movistar Team	12h 19' 36"
2	Antonia Niedermaier (GER)	Canyon//SRAM	+ 2' 07"
3	Veronica Ewers (USA)	EF Education–Tibco–SVB	+ 2' 18"
4	Juliette Labous (FRA)	Team dsm–firmenich	+ 3' 00"
5	Gaia Realini (ITA)	Lidl–Trek	+ 3' 14"
6	Mavi García (ESP)	Liv Racing TeqFind	+ 3' 39"
7	Erica Magnaldi (ITA)	UAE Team ADQ	+ 3' 39"
8	Cecilie Uttrup Ludwig (DEN)	FDJ–Suez	+ 4' 29"
9	Ane Santesteban (ESP)	Team Jayco–AlUla	+ 4' 57"
10	Niamh Fisher-Black (NZL)	SD Worx	+ 5' 03"

== Stage 6 ==
5 July 2023 — Canelli to Canelli, 104.4 km (64.9 mi)

Stage 6 Result
Rank	Rider	Team	Time
1	Annemiek van Vleuten (NED)	Movistar Team	2h 39' 04"
2	Lorena Wiebes (NED)	SD Worx	+ 20"
3	Liane Lippert (GER)	SD Worx	+ 20"
4	Soraya Paladin (ITA)	Canyon//SRAM	+ 25"
5	Silvia Persico (ITA)	UAE Team ADQ	+ 28"
6	Niamh Fisher-Black (NZL)	SD Worx	+ 28"
7	Mavi García (ESP)	Liv Racing TeqFind	+ 28"
8	Ane Santesteban (ESP)	Team Jayco–AlUla	+ 28"
9	Fem van Empel (NED)	Team Jumbo–Visma	+ 31"
10	Ally Wollaston (NZL)	AG Insurance–Soudal–Quick-Step	+ 31"

General classification after Stage 6
Rank	Rider	Team	Time
1	Annemiek van Vleuten (NED)	Movistar Team	14h 58' 29"
2	Veronica Ewers (USA)	EF Education–Tibco–SVB	+ 3' 03"
3	Juliette Labous (FRA)	Team dsm–firmenich	+ 3' 39"
4	Gaia Realini (ITA)	Lidl–Trek	+ 3' 59"
5	Mavi García (ESP)	Liv Racing TeqFind	+ 4' 18"
6	Erica Magnaldi (ITA)	UAE Team ADQ	+ 4' 21"
7	Cecilie Uttrup Ludwig (DEN)	FDJ–Suez	+ 5' 11"
8	Ane Santesteban (ESP)	Team Jayco–AlUla	+ 5' 36"
9	Niamh Fisher-Black (NZL)	SD Worx	+ 5' 42"
10	Silvia Persico (ITA)	UAE Team ADQ	+ 5' 50"

== Stage 7 ==
6 July 2023 — Albenga to Alassio, 109.1 km (67.8 mi)

Stage 7 Result
Rank	Rider	Team	Time
1	Annemiek van Vleuten (NED)	Movistar Team	3h 07' 52"
2	Juliette Labous (FRA)	Team dsm–firmenich	+ 13"
3	Gaia Realini (ITA)	Lidl–Trek	+ 20"
4	Liane Lippert (GER)	Movistar Team	+ 49"
5	Cecilie Uttrup Ludwig (DEN)	FDJ–Suez	+ 55"
6	Silvia Persico (ITA)	UAE Team ADQ	+ 1' 01"
7	Évita Muzic (FRA)	FDJ–Suez	+ 1' 06"
8	Niamh Fisher-Black (NZL)	SD Worx	+ 1' 06"
9	Erica Magnaldi (ITA)	UAE Team ADQ	+ 1' 06"
10	Mavi García (ESP)	Liv Racing TeqFind	+ 1' 57"

General classification after Stage 7
Rank	Rider	Team	Time
1	Annemiek van Vleuten (NED)	Movistar Team	18h 06' 11"
2	Juliette Labous (FRA)	Team dsm–firmenich	+ 3' 56"
3	Gaia Realini (ITA)	Lidl–Trek	+ 4' 25"
4	Veronica Ewers (USA)	EF Education–Tibco–SVB	+ 5' 35"
5	Erica Magnaldi (ITA)	UAE Team ADQ	+ 5' 37"
6	Cecilie Uttrup Ludwig (DEN)	FDJ–Suez	+ 6' 16"
7	Mavi García (ESP)	Liv Racing TeqFind	+ 6' 25"
8	Niamh Fisher-Black (NZL)	SD Worx	+ 6' 58"
9	Silvia Persico (ITA)	UAE Team ADQ	+ 7' 01"
10	Ane Santesteban (ESP)	Team Jayco–AlUla	+ 9' 12"

== Rest day ==
7 July 2023 — Sardinia

== Stage 8 ==
8 July 2023 — Nuoro to Sassari, 125.7 km (78.1 mi)

Stage 8 Result
Rank	Rider	Team	Time
1	Blanka Vas (HUN)	SD Worx	3h 00' 41"
2	Chloé Dygert (USA)	Team dsm–firmenich	+ 0"
3	Liane Lippert (GER)	Movistar Team	+ 0"
4	Silvia Persico (ITA)	UAE Team ADQ	+ 0"
5	Ally Wollaston (NZL)	AG Insurance–Soudal–Quick-Step	+ 0"
6	Cecilie Uttrup Ludwig (DEN)	FDJ–Suez	+ 0"
7	Mavi García (ESP)	Liv Racing TeqFind	+ 0"
8	Greta Marturano (ITA)	Fenix–Deceuninck	+ 0"
9	Ane Santesteban (ESP)	Team Jayco–AlUla	+ 0"
10	Marianne Vos (NED)	Team Jumbo–Visma	+ 0"

General classification after Stage 8
Rank	Rider	Team	Time
1	Annemiek van Vleuten (NED)	Movistar Team	21h 06' 52"
2	Juliette Labous (FRA)	Team dsm–firmenich	+ 3' 56"
3	Gaia Realini (ITA)	Lidl–Trek	+ 4' 23"
4	Erica Magnaldi (ITA)	UAE Team ADQ	+ 5' 34"
5	Veronica Ewers (USA)	EF Education–Tibco–SVB	+ 5' 35"
6	Cecilie Uttrup Ludwig (DEN)	FDJ–Suez	+ 6' 16"
7	Mavi García (ESP)	Liv Racing TeqFind	+ 6' 25"
8	Silvia Persico (ITA)	UAE Team ADQ	+ 7' 01"
9	Niamh Fisher-Black (NZL)	SD Worx	+ 7' 28"
10	Ane Santesteban (ESP)	Team Jayco–AlUla	+ 9' 12"

== Stage 9 ==
9 July 2023 — Sassari to Olbia, 126.8 km (78.8 mi)

Stage 9 Result
Rank	Rider	Team	Time
1	Chiara Consonni (ITA)	UAE Team ADQ	3h 19' 33"
2	Marianne Vos (NED)	Team Jumbo–Visma	+ 0"
3	Ally Wollaston (NZL)	AG Insurance–Soudal–Quick-Step	+ 0"
4	Chloé Dygert (USA)	Canyon//SRAM	+ 0"
5	Megan Jastrab (USA)	Team dsm–firmenich	+ 0"
6	Rachele Barbieri (ITA)	Liv Racing TeqFind	+ 0"
7	Susanne Andersen (NOR)	Uno-X Pro Cycling Team	+ 0"
8	Letizia Paternoster (ITA)	Team Jayco–AlUla	+ 0"
9	Gladys Verhulst (FRA)	FDJ–Suez	+ 0"
10	Silvia Zanardi (ITA)	Bepink	+ 0"

General classification after Stage 9
Rank	Rider	Team	Time
1	Annemiek van Vleuten (NED)	Movistar Team	24h 26' 25"
2	Juliette Labous (FRA)	Team dsm–firmenich	+ 3' 56"
3	Gaia Realini (ITA)	Lidl–Trek	+ 4' 23"
4	Veronica Ewers (USA)	EF Education–Tibco–SVB	+ 5' 34"
5	Erica Magnaldi (ITA)	UAE Team ADQ	+ 5' 34"
6	Cecilie Uttrup Ludwig (DEN)	FDJ–Suez	+ 6' 16"
7	Mavi García (ESP)	Liv Racing TeqFind	+ 6' 25"
8	Silvia Persico (ITA)	UAE Team ADQ	+ 6' 59"
9	Niamh Fisher-Black (NZL)	SD Worx	+ 7' 28"
10	Ane Santesteban (ESP)	Team Jayco–AlUla	+ 9' 12"
