= 2023 La Vuelta Femenina =

Women's cycling race in Spain

2023 UCI Women's World Tour, race 15 of 27

Race details
- Dates: 1–7 May
- Stages: 7
- Distance: 741 km (460 mi)
- Winning time: 19h 00' 11"

Results
Jersey awarded to the overall winner	Winner	Annemiek van Vleuten (NED)	(Movistar Team)
	Second	Demi Vollering (NED)	(SD Worx)
	Third	Gaia Realini (ITA)	(Trek–Segafredo)
Jersey awarded to the points classification winner	Points	Marianne Vos (NED)	(Team Jumbo–Visma)
Jersey awarded to the mountains classification winner	Mountains	Gaia Realini (ITA)	(Trek–Segafredo)
Jersey awarded to the combativity classification winner	Combativity	Marianne Vos (NED)	(Team Jumbo–Visma)
Jersey awarded to the team classification winner	Team	UAE Team ADQ	

The 2023 La Vuelta Femenina (officially La Vuelta Femenina by Carrefour.es) was the first edition of La Vuelta Femenina, a cycling stage race which takes place in Spain. The race took place from 1 to 7 May 2023, and was the 15th event in the 2023 UCI Women's World Tour.

The race was organised by Unipublic and Amaury Sport Organisation (ASO), which also organises the men's Vuelta a España. La Vuelta Femenina replaced the stage race (previously one day race) Challenge by La Vuelta, which was staged at the same time as the men's tour.

The race was won by Dutch rider Annemiek van Vleuten of Movistar Team, making her the first woman to win all three of the major stage races in women's cycling (La Vuelta Femenina, Tour de France Femmes and Giro Donne). She beat her Dutch rival Demi Vollering of SD Worx by just nine seconds, with Italian Gaia Realini of Trek–Segafredo in third place.

== Teams ==
12 UCI Women's WorldTeams were automatically invited, joined by 12 UCI Women's Continental Teams (9 of them from Spain). The teams were announced on 3 March 2023. Each team will have seven riders.

On 26 April, Zaaf Cycling Team withdrew their entry following allegations of unpaid wages. Two days later, the Union Cycliste Internationale (UCI) revoked Zaaf's licence as they lacked the required number of riders. 23 teams therefore took part in the race.

UCI Women's WorldTeams

- Canyon//SRAM
- EF Education–Tibco–SVB
- FDJ–Suez
- Israel Premier Tech Roland
- Liv Racing TeqFind
- Movistar Team
- Team DSM
- Team Jayco–AlUla
- Team Jumbo–Visma
- SD Worx
- Trek–Segafredo
- UAE Team ADQ

UCI Women's Continental Teams

- Bepink
- Bizkaia–Durango
- Eneicat–CMTeam–Seguros Deportivos
- Laboral Kutxa–Fundación Euskadi
- Massi–Tactic
- Cantabria Deporte–Río Miera
- Soltec Team
- Sopela Women's Team
- St. Michel–Mavic–Auber93
- Team Coop–Hitec Products
- Team Farto–BTC
- ~~Zaaf Cycling Team~~

== Route and stages ==
In February 2023, the route was announced by race director Fernando Escartín, who also confirmed that the race will be sponsored by supermarket Carrefour. The race was the first edition of La Vuelta Femenina, however, the media noted that the race had grown from the previous Challenge by La Vuelta races.

The race started in Torrevieja on the Costa Blanca with a team time trial, before heading north with stages through Castilla–La Mancha, Community of Madrid and Castile and León. The final two stages took place in Cantabria and Asturias, with a decisive final climb up the Lagos de Covadonga, a 16 kilometres (9.9 mi) ascent with an average gradient of 7.4%. The first rider to the top of the Lagos de Covadonga climb was awarded the Cima Estela Domínguez, honouring the Spanish rider who was killed while training in 2023.

The previous Challenge by La Vuelta events had been criticised by the women's peloton for not being challenging enough. Three-time Giro Donne winner and 2022 Tour de France Femmes winner Annemiek van Vleuten praised the 2023 route, calling it "a very complete Vuelta", and welcomed that the inclusion of the Lagos de Covadonga climb on the final stage, stating "to end in such a famous location is essential for the race".

Stage characteristics
Stage	Date	Course	Distance	Type	Winner
1	1 May	Torrevieja	14.5 km (9.0 mi)	Team time trial	(Netherlands) Team Jumbo–Visma
2	2 May	Orihuela to Pilar de la Horadada	105.8 km (65.7 mi)	Flat stage	Charlotte Kool (NED)
3	3 May	Elche de la Sierra to La Roda	158 km (98 mi)	Flat stage	Marianne Vos (NED)
4	4 May	Cuenca to Guadalajara	133.1 km (82.7 mi)	Hilly stage	Marianne Vos (NED)
5	5 May	La Cabrera to Mirador de Peñas Llanas, Riaza	129.2 km (80.3 mi)	Mountain stage	Demi Vollering (NED)
6	6 May	Castro Urdiales to Laredo	106.7 km (66.3 mi)	Medium-mountain stage	Gaia Realini (ITA)
7	7 May	Pola de Siero to Lagos de Covadonga	93.7 km (58.2 mi)	Mountain stage	Demi Vollering (NED)
Total			741 km (460 mi)		

== Race overview ==
Prior to the start of the race, Annemiek van Vleuten, Demi Vollering, Gaia Realini, Mavi García, Kasia Niewiadoma and Juliette Labous were all named as pre-race favourites for the general classification (GC), with Charlotte Kool, Emma Norsgaard and Marianne Vos tipped for the points classification. Potential contender for the general classification Elisa Longo Borghini announced that she would miss the race due to a stomach bug.

For the first time in 2023, each team had 7 riders following a UCI rule change mandating this for events longer than six days. The Zaaf Cycling Team withdrew their entry prior to the start of the event following allegations of unpaid wages. Consequently, 161 riders from 23 teams were present at the start of the race.

== Classification leadership table ==
Stage	Winner	General classification	Points classification	Mountains classification	Team classification	Combativity award
1	Team Jumbo–Visma	Anna Henderson	not awarded	not awarded	Team Jumbo–Visma	not awarded
2	Charlotte Kool	Marianne Vos	Charlotte Kool	Jade Wiel	Team Jumbo–Visma	Yurani Blanco
3	Marianne Vos	Marianne Vos	Marianne Vos	Jade Wiel	Team Jumbo–Visma	Alba Teruel
4	Marianne Vos	Marianne Vos	Marianne Vos	Elise Chabbey	Team Jumbo–Visma	Anna Kiesenhofer
5	Demi Vollering	Demi Vollering	Marianne Vos	Elise Chabbey	Canyon//SRAM	Ane Santesteban
6	Gaia Realini	Annemiek van Vleuten	Marianne Vos	Annemiek van Vleuten	UAE Team ADQ	Gaia Realini
7	Demi Vollering	Annemiek van Vleuten	Marianne Vos	Gaia Realini	UAE Team ADQ	Marianne Vos
Final		Annemiek van Vleuten	Marianne Vos	Gaia Realini	UAE Team ADQ	not awarded

== Classification standings ==
Legend
Denotes the winner of the general classification	Denotes the winner of the team classification
Denotes the winner of the points classification	Denotes the winner of the combativity award
Denotes the winner of the mountains classification	

=== General classification ===
Final general classification (1–10)
Rank	Rider	Team	Time
1	Annemiek van Vleuten (NED)	Movistar Team	19h 00' 11"
2	Demi Vollering (NED)	SD Worx	+ 9"
3	Gaia Realini (ITA)	Trek–Segafredo	+ 2' 41"
4	Riejanne Markus (NED)	Team Jumbo–Visma	+ 3' 36"
5	Ricarda Bauernfeind (GER)	Canyon//SRAM	+ 3' 53"
6	Évita Muzic (FRA)	FDJ–Suez	+ 4' 24"
7	Juliette Labous (FRA)	Team DSM	+ 4' 27"
8	Erica Magnaldi (ITA)	UAE Team ADQ	+ 4' 46"
9	Mavi García (ESP)	Liv Racing TeqFind	+ 6' 31"
10	Katarzyna Niewiadoma (POL)	Canyon//SRAM	+ 7' 22"

=== Points classification ===
Final points classification (1–10)
Rank	Rider	Team	Points
1	Marianne Vos (NED)	Team Jumbo–Visma	197
2	Demi Vollering (NED)	SD Worx	142
3	Annemiek van Vleuten (NED)	Movistar Team	138
4	Gaia Realini (ITA)	Trek–Segafredo	121
5	Riejanne Markus (NED)	Team Jumbo–Visma	101
6	Marlen Reusser (SUI)	SD Worx	65
7	Évita Muzic (FRA)	FDJ–Suez	58
8	Emma Norsgaard (DEN)	Movistar Team	58
9	Katarzyna Niewiadoma (POL)	Canyon//SRAM	39
10	Juliette Labous (FRA)	Team DSM	38

=== Mountains classification ===
Final mountains classification (1–10)
Rank	Rider	Team	Points
1	Gaia Realini (ITA)	Trek–Segafredo	43
2	Demi Vollering (NED)	SD Worx	41
3	Annemiek van Vleuten (NED)	Movistar Team	38
4	Évita Muzic (FRA)	FDJ–Suez	22
5	Elise Chabbey (SUI)	Canyon//SRAM	18
6	Amanda Spratt (AUS)	Trek–Segafredo	13
7	Ricarda Bauernfeind (GER)	Canyon//SRAM	12
8	Erica Magnaldi (ITA)	UAE Team ADQ	12
9	Marta Cavalli (ITA)	FDJ–Suez	10
10	Marlen Reusser (SUI)	SD Worx	8

=== Team classification ===
Final team classification (1–10)
Rank	Team	Time
1	UAE Team ADQ	56h 39' 07"
2	FDJ–Suez	+ 6' 00"
3	Canyon//SRAM	+ 7' 14"
4	SD Worx	+ 18' 05"
5	Movistar Team	+ 24' 58"
6	Team Jumbo–Visma	+ 30' 10"
7	Team DSM	+ 31' 45"
8	Trek–Segafredo	+ 37' 01"
9	Team Jayco–AlUla	+ 52' 53"
10	Israel Premier Tech Roland	+ 57' 15"
