= Villacorta, Castile and Leon =

Town in Riaza, Segovia, Spain

Villacorta (Spanish pronunciation: [biʎaˈkoɾta]) is a town, district of the municipality of Riaza, in the old historical comarca of Tierra de Riaza, in the province of Segovia, Castile and Leon, Spain. It is 13 km from Riaza, along the road Santibanez de Ayllón.
