= Church of Santa Quiteria =

- Iglesia Parroquial de Santa Quiteria (Spanish)
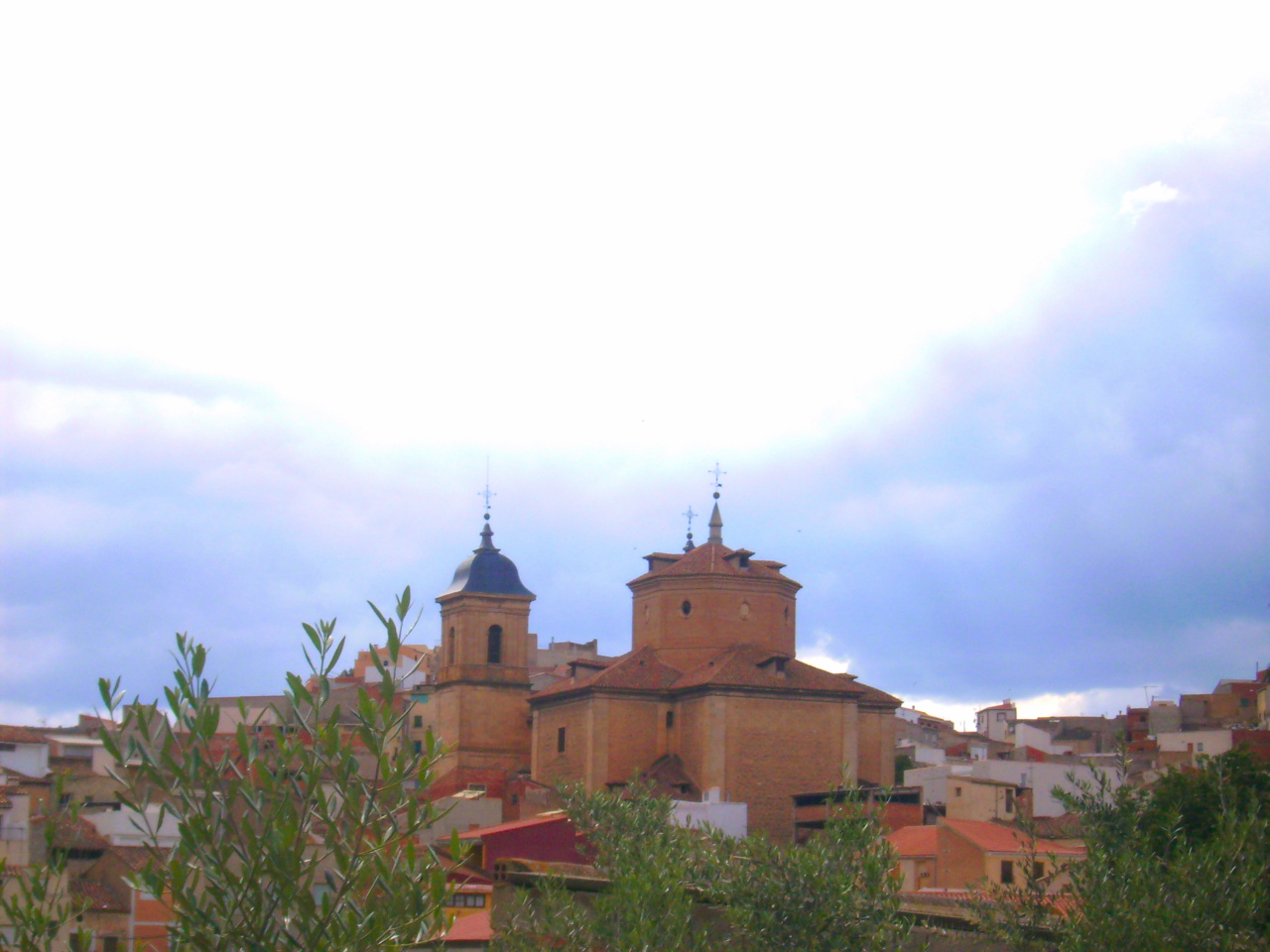

- Location within Spain
- 38.447833°N 2.047572°W
- Location: Elche de la Sierra, Spain

Spanish Cultural Heritage
- Official name: Iglesia Parroquial de Santa Quiteria
- Type: Non-movable
- Criteria: Monument
- Designated: 1992
- Reference no.: RI-51-0007362

The Church of Santa Quiteria (Spanish: Iglesia Parroquial de Santa Quiteria) is a church located in Elche de la Sierra, Spain. It was declared Bien de Interés Cultural in 1992.
