= 2023 Giro Donne =

Italian cycling race

2023 UCI Women's World Tour, race 20 of 27
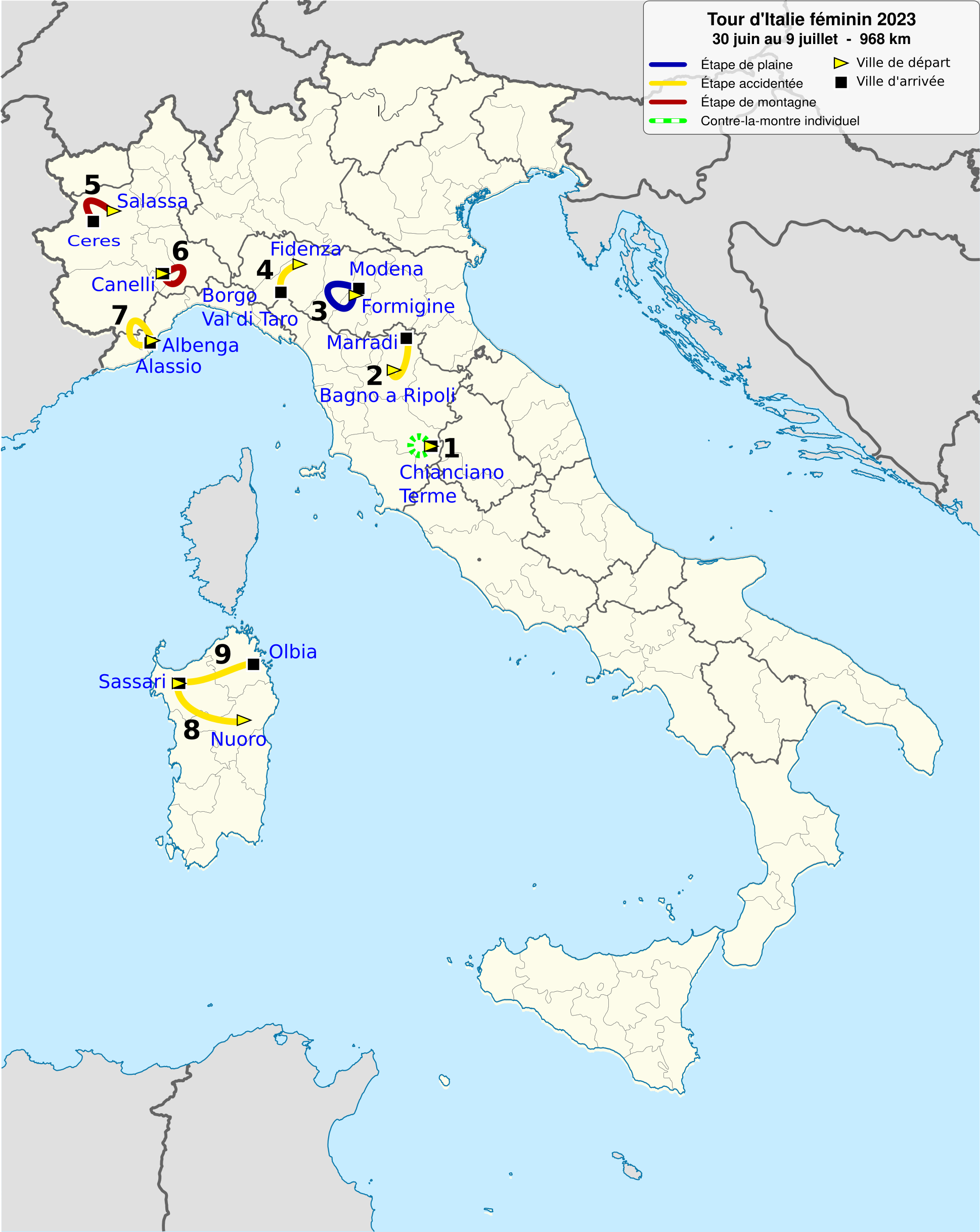

Race details
- Dates: 30 June – 9 July 2023
- Stages: 9
- Distance: 928 km (577 mi)
- Winning time: 24h 26' 25"

Results
Jersey awarded to the overall winner	Winner	Annemiek van Vleuten (NED)	(Movistar Team)
	Second	Juliette Labous (FRA)	(Team dsm–firmenich)
	Third	Gaia Realini (ITA)	(Lidl–Trek)
Jersey awarded to the points classification winner	Points	Annemiek van Vleuten (NED)	(Movistar Team)
Jersey awarded to the mountains classification winner	Mountains	Annemiek van Vleuten (NED)	(Movistar Team)
Jersey awarded to the youth classification winner	Youth	Gaia Realini (ITA)	(Lidl–Trek)
Jersey awarded to the team classification winner	Team	(Spain) Movistar Team	

The 2023 Giro Donne was the 34th edition of the Giro Donne, a women's road cycling stage race that took place in Italy. The race began on the 30 June and ended on 9 July 2023. It was the 20th race in the 2023 UCI Women's World Tour calendar.

The race was won by Annemiek van Vleuten of Movistar Team for the fourth time, beating Juliette Labous by nearly four minutes. Van Vleuten also won the points and mountains classifications, with Gaia Realini winning the youth classification and the Italian rider classification.

== Teams ==
24 teams participated in the race. Each team had seven riders, one more than the 2022 edition. All 15 UCI Women's WorldTeams were automatically invited. They were joined by 9 UCI Women's Continental Teams selected by organisers PMG Sport/Starlight. The teams were announced on 25 May 2023.

UCI Women's WorldTeams

- Canyon//SRAM
- EF Education–Tibco–SVB
- FDJ–Suez
- Fenix–Deceuninck
- Human Powered Health
- Israel Premier Tech Roland
- Lidl–Trek
- Liv Racing TeqFind
- Movistar Team
- Team dsm–firmenich
- Team Jayco–AlUla
- Team Jumbo–Visma
- SD Worx
- UAE Team ADQ
- Uno-X Pro Cycling Team

UCI Women's Continental Teams

- AG Insurance–Soudal–Quick-Step
- Aromitalia–Basso Bikes–Vaiano
- Bepink
- Bizkaia–Durango
- Born To Win-Zhiraf-G20
- GB Junior Team Piemonte
- Isolmant–Premac–Vittoria
- Team Mendelspeck
- Top Girls Fassa Bortolo

== Route ==
In May 2023, the route was announced by organisers PMG Sport/Starlight. The race started in Tuscany with an individual time trial, before heading north-west through the Emilia-Romagna, Piedmont, Liguria regions. After seven stages, the race transferred to Sardinia for the last two stages. The announcement of the route was criticised, taking place around 1 month prior to the event. The route itself was also criticised, with a drop in the total number of stages and stage length compared to previous editions.

As with the previous editions, the route required a waiver from the Union Cycliste Internationale, as Women's WorldTour races have a maximum race length of six days.

Stage characteristics
Stage	Date	Course	Distance	Type	Winner
1	30 June	Chianciano	4.4 km (2.7 mi)	Individual time trial	Stage neutralised (Note: Stage 1 was neutralised due to a thunderstorm and flooded roads)
2	1 July	Bagno a Ripoli to Marradi	102.1 km (63.4 mi)	Medium-mountain stage	Annemiek van Vleuten (NED)
3	2 July	Formigine to Modena	118.2 km (73.4 mi)	Flat stage	Lorena Wiebes (NED)
4	3 July	Fidenza to Borgo Val di Taro	134 km (83 mi)	Hilly stage	Elisa Longo Borghini (ITA)
5	4 July	Salassa to Ceres	103.3 km (64.2 mi)	Mountain stage	Antonia Niedermaier (GER)
6	5 July	Canelli to Canelli	104.4 km (64.9 mi)	Hilly stage	Annemiek van Vleuten (NED)
7	6 July	Albenga to Alassio	109.1 km (67.8 mi)	Hilly stage	Annemiek van Vleuten (NED)
	7 July	Transfer to Sardinia			
8	8 July	Nuoro to Sassari	125.7 km (78.1 mi)	Hilly stage	Blanka Vas (HUN)
9	9 July	Sassari to Olbia	126.8 km (78.8 mi)	Medium-mountain stage	Chiara Consonni (ITA)
Total			928 km (577 mi)		

== Summary ==
Prior to the race, three-time winner Annemiek van Vleuten of Movistar Team was considered the favourite for the victory, with media noting that riders such as Gaia Realini and Elisa Longo Borghini of Lidl–Trek, Mavi Garcia of Liv Racing TeqFind and Niamh Fisher-Black of SD Worx would also be contenders. Marta Bastianelli of UAE Team ADQ will retire from professional cycling following her home race.

One day prior to the event, an official start list was not available. The organisation of the race was criticised by Lizzie Deignan, noting the financial difficulties of the organiser.

== Classification leadership table ==
Classification leadership by stage
Stage	Winner	General classification	Points classification	Mountains classification	Young rider classification	Italian rider classification	Team classification
1	Stage neutralised						
2	Annemiek van Vleuten	Annemiek van Vleuten	Annemiek van Vleuten	Annemiek van Vleuten	Gaia Realini	Elisa Longo Borghini	FDJ–Suez
3	Lorena Wiebes	Annemiek van Vleuten	Annemiek van Vleuten	Marta Cavalli	Gaia Realini	Elisa Longo Borghini	FDJ–Suez
4	Elisa Longo Borghini	Annemiek van Vleuten	Annemiek van Vleuten	Marta Cavalli	Gaia Realini	Elisa Longo Borghini	FDJ–Suez
5	Antonia Niedermaier	Annemiek van Vleuten	Annemiek van Vleuten	Annemiek van Vleuten	Antonia Niedermaier	Gaia Realini	Lidl–Trek
6	Annemiek van Vleuten	Annemiek van Vleuten	Annemiek van Vleuten	Annemiek van Vleuten	Gaia Realini	Gaia Realini	Lidl–Trek
7	Annemiek van Vleuten	Annemiek van Vleuten	Annemiek van Vleuten	Annemiek van Vleuten	Gaia Realini	Gaia Realini	Movistar Team
8	Blanka Vas	Annemiek van Vleuten	Annemiek van Vleuten	Annemiek van Vleuten	Gaia Realini	Gaia Realini	Movistar Team
9	Chiara Consonni	Annemiek van Vleuten	Annemiek van Vleuten	Annemiek van Vleuten	Gaia Realini	Gaia Realini	Movistar Team
Final		Annemiek van Vleuten	Annemiek van Vleuten	Annemiek van Vleuten	Gaia Realini	Gaia Realini	Movistar Team

== Classification standings ==
Legend
Denotes the winner of the general classification	Denotes the winner of the mountains classification
Denotes the winner of the points classification	Denotes the winner of the young rider classification
Denotes the winner of the Italian rider classification	Denotes the winner of the team classification

=== General classification ===
Final general classification (1–10)
Rank	Rider	Team	Time
1	Annemiek van Vleuten (NED)	Movistar Team	24h 26' 25"
2	Juliette Labous (FRA)	Team dsm–firmenich	+ 3' 56"
3	Gaia Realini (ITA)	Lidl–Trek	+ 4' 23"
4	Veronica Ewers (USA)	EF Education–Tibco–SVB	+ 5' 34"
5	Erica Magnaldi (ITA)	UAE Team ADQ	+ 5' 34"
6	Cecilie Uttrup Ludwig (DEN)	FDJ–Suez	+ 6' 16"
7	Mavi García (ESP)	Liv Racing TeqFind	+ 6' 25"
8	Silvia Persico (ITA)	UAE Team ADQ	+ 6' 59"
9	Niamh Fisher-Black (NZL)	SD Worx	+ 7' 28"
10	Ane Santesteban (ESP)	Team Jayco–AlUla	+ 9' 12"

=== Points classification ===
Final points classification (1–10)
Rank	Rider	Team	Points
1	Annemiek van Vleuten (NED)	Movistar Team	67
2	Chloé Dygert (USA)	Canyon//SRAM	35
3	Marianne Vos (NED)	Team Jumbo–Visma	31
4	Juliette Labous (FRA)	Team dsm–firmenich	30
5	Liane Lippert (GER)	Movistar Team	28
6	Silvia Persico (ITA)	UAE Team ADQ	24
7	Cecilie Uttrup Ludwig (DEN)	FDJ–Suez	23
8	Veronica Ewers (USA)	EF Education–Tibco–SVB	20
9	Chiara Consonni (ITA)	UAE Team ADQ	18
10	Mavi García (ESP)	Liv Racing TeqFind	18

=== Mountains classification ===
Final mountains classification (1–10)
Rank	Rider	Team	Points
1	Annemiek van Vleuten (NED)	Movistar Team	71
2	Gaia Realini (ITA)	Lidl–Trek	35
3	Niamh Fisher-Black (NZL)	SD Worx	34
4	Fem van Empel (NED)	Team Jumbo–Visma	24
5	Marta Cavalli (ITA)	FDJ–Suez	23
6	Veronica Ewers (USA)	EF Education–Tibco–SVB	18
7	Anouska Koster (NED)	Uno-X Pro Cycling Team	15
8	Liane Lippert (GER)	Movistar Team	15
9	Juliette Labous (FRA)	Team dsm–firmenich	13
10	Ane Santesteban (ESP)	Team Jayco–AlUla	11

=== Young rider classification ===
Final young rider classification (1–10)
Rank	Rider	Team	Time
1	Gaia Realini (ITA)	Lidl–Trek	24h 30' 48"
2	Fem van Empel (NED)	Team Jumbo–Visma	+ 6' 21"
3	Anna Shackley (GBR)	SD Worx	+ 8' 15"
4	Petra Stiasny (SUI)	Fenix–Deceuninck	+ 25' 48"
5	Shirin van Anrooij (NED)	Lidl–Trek	+ 29' 13"
6	Francesca Barale (ITA)	Team dsm–firmenich	+ 31' 37"
7	Noemi Rüegg (SUI)	Team Jumbo–Visma	+ 37' 27"
8	Blanka Vas (HUN)	SD Worx	+ 45' 32"
9	Gaia Masetti (ITA)	AG Insurance–Soudal–Quick-Step	+ 49' 45"
10	Ally Wollaston (NZL)	AG Insurance–Soudal–Quick-Step	+ 50' 30"

=== Italian rider classification ===
Italian rider classification after stage 8 (1–10)
Rank	Rider	Team	Time
1	Gaia Realini (ITA)	Lidl–Trek	21h 11' 15"
2	Erica Magnaldi (ITA)	UAE Team ADQ	+ 1' 11"
3	Silvia Persico (ITA)	UAE Team ADQ	+ 2' 38"
4	Marta Cavalli (ITA)	FDJ–Suez	+ 12' 28"
5	Barbara Malcotti (ITA)	Human Powered Health	+ 19' 45"
6	Greta Marturano (ITA)	Fenix–Deceuninck	+ 19' 59"
7	Soraya Paladin (ITA)	Canyon//SRAM	+ 28' 38"
8	Francesca Barale (ITA)	Team dsm–firmenich	+ 31' 04"
9	Alessia Viglia (ITA)	Top Girls Fassa Bortolo	+ 35' 33"
10	Francesca Tommasi (ITA)	Team Mendelspeck	+ 38' 06"

=== Team classification ===
Team classification after stage 8 (1–10)
Rank	Team	Time
1	(Spain) Movistar Team	63h 56' 12"
2	(France) FDJ–Suez	+ 46"
3	(United States) Lidl–Trek	+ 10' 45"
4	(Netherlands) Team dsm–firmenich	+ 21' 34"
5	(Germany) Canyon//SRAM	+ 25' 35"
6	(United Arab Emirates) UAE Team ADQ	+ 27' 42"
7	(Netherlands) SD Worx	+ 31' 27"
8	(Australia) Team Jayco–AlUla	+ 37' 28"
9	(Belgium) Fenix–Deceuninck	+ 44' 12"
10	(United States) EF Education–Tibco–SVB	+ 48' 09"

== Broadcasting ==
Prior to the race, organisers PMG Sport/Starlight stated that they could not afford the €730,000 cost of TV coverage, which is required for the UCI Women's World Tour. Media reports suggested that without TV coverage, the race could be cancelled. Subsequently, agreement was made between the Italian Cycling Federation and Italian national broadcaster RAI to broadcast the race. CyclingNews reported that each stage would have "roughly one hour" of live coverage on RAI, Eurosport and Global Cycling Network.
