= Lakes of Covadonga =

Lake Enol and Lake Ercina in Spain

Lagos de Covadonga
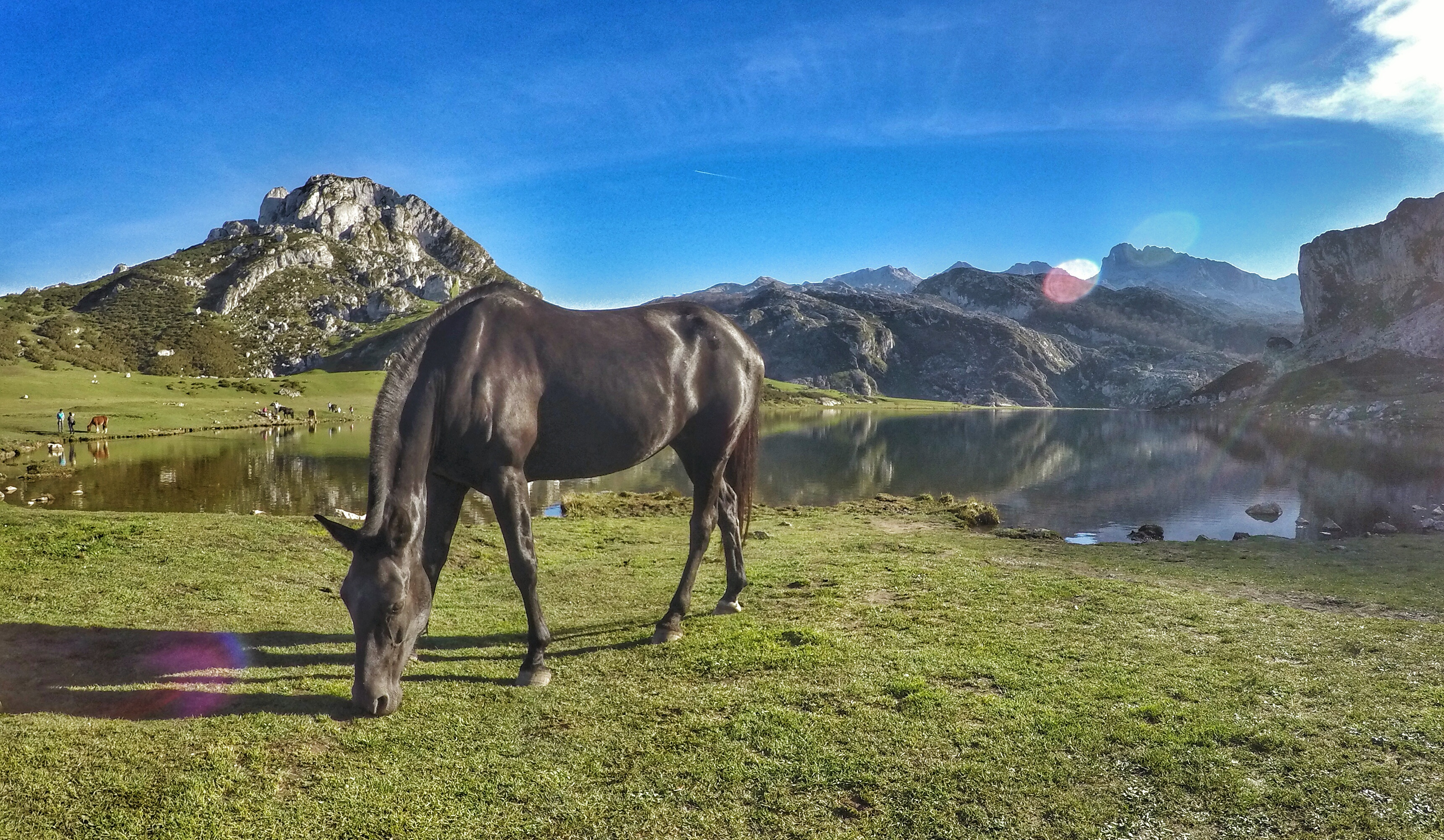
- Interactive map of Lagos de Covadonga
- Location: Picos de Europa, Asturias, Spain
- Coordinates: 43°17′N 4°57′W
- Type: Glacial lakes
- Surface elevation: 1,134 m (3,720 ft)

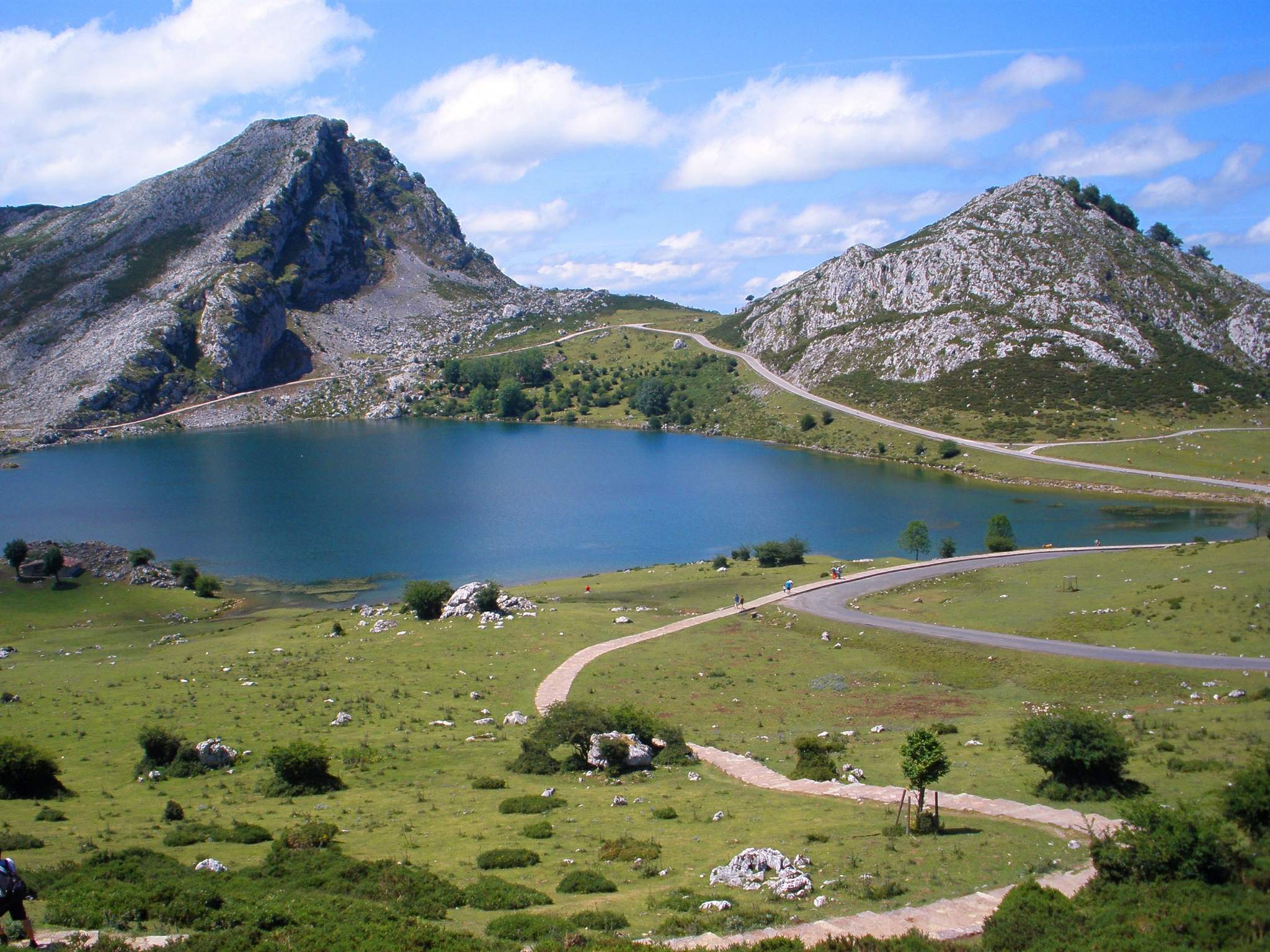
Lago Enol seen from La Picota

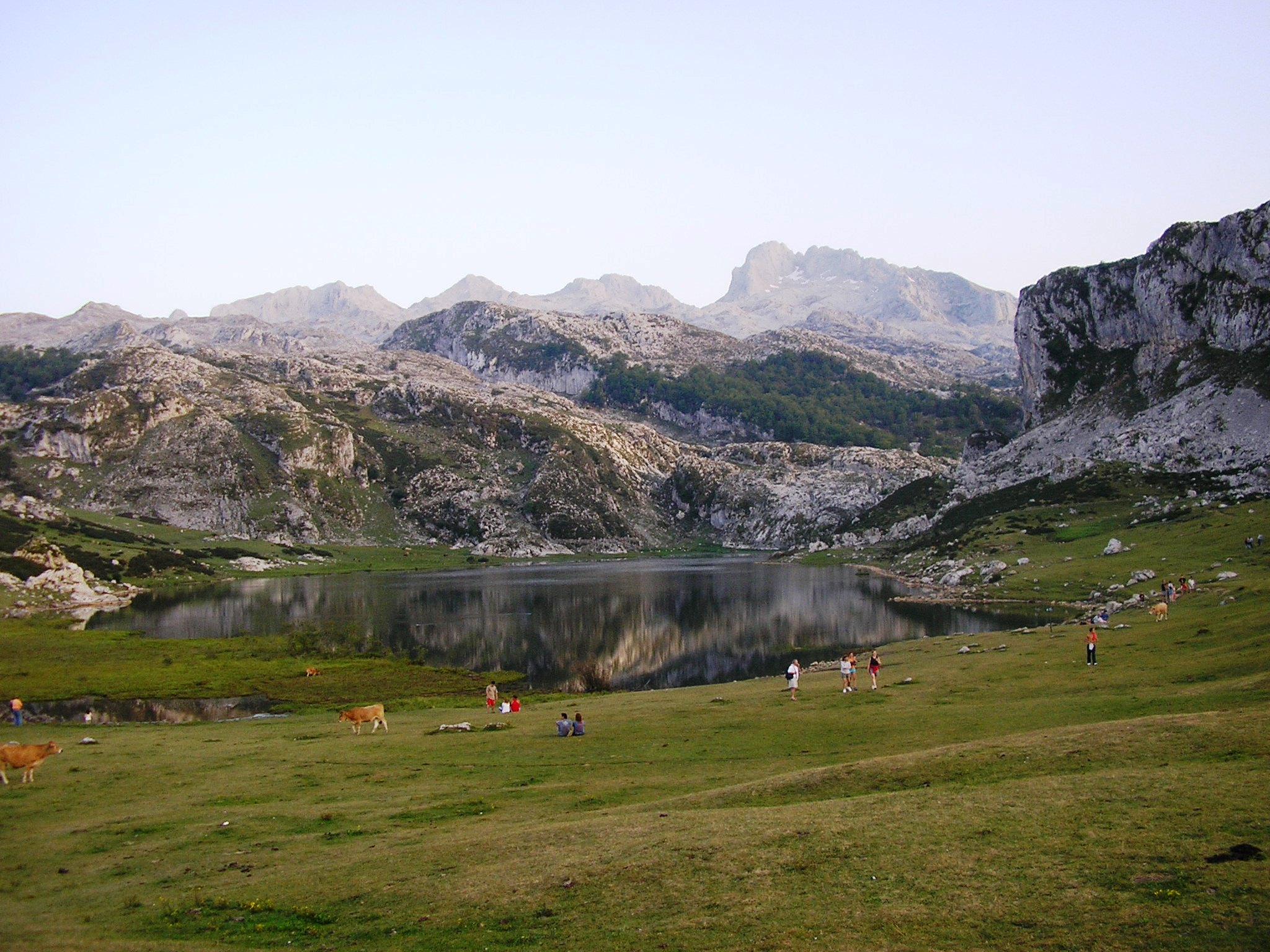
Lago Ercina

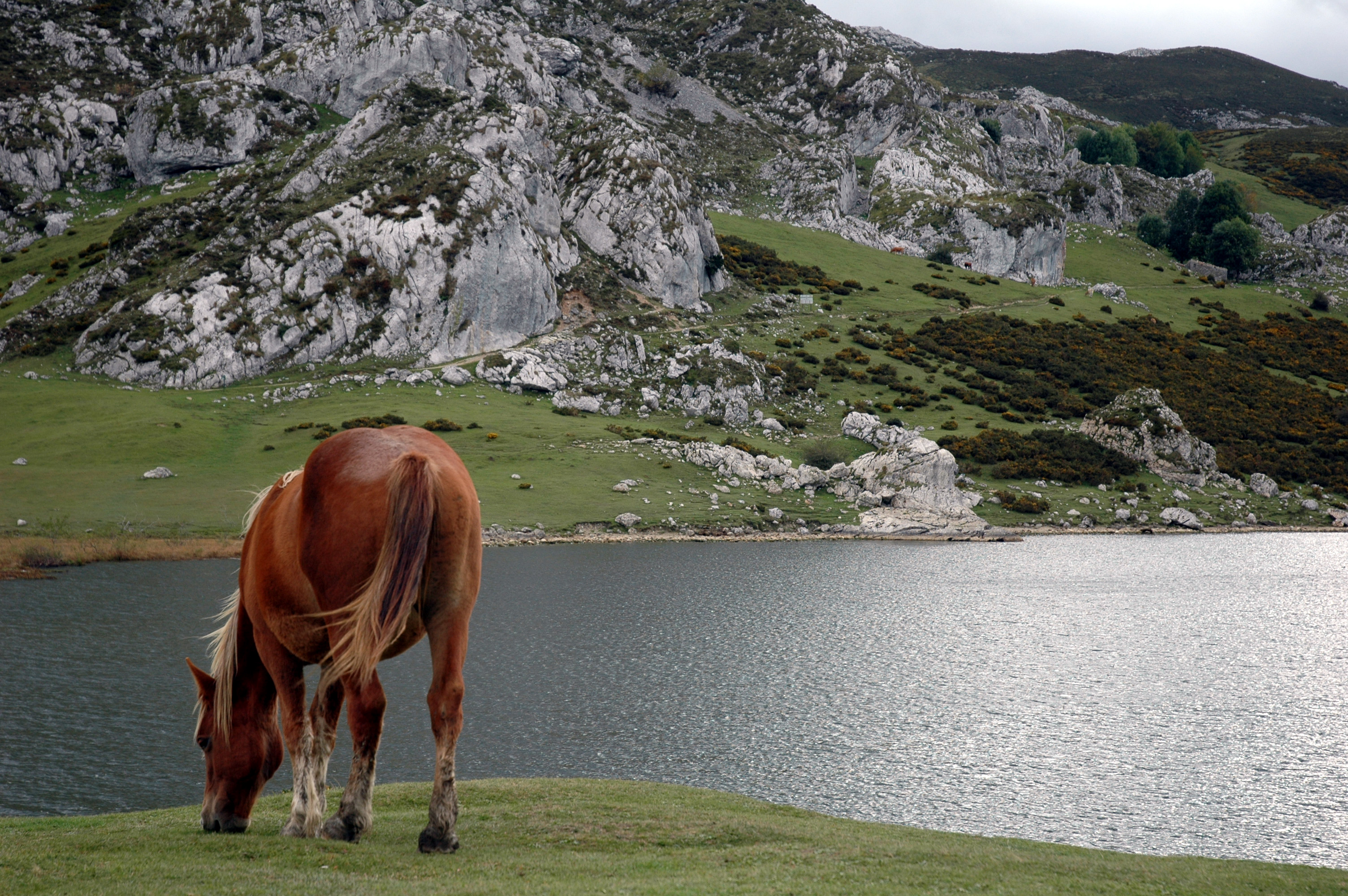
Ercina Lake

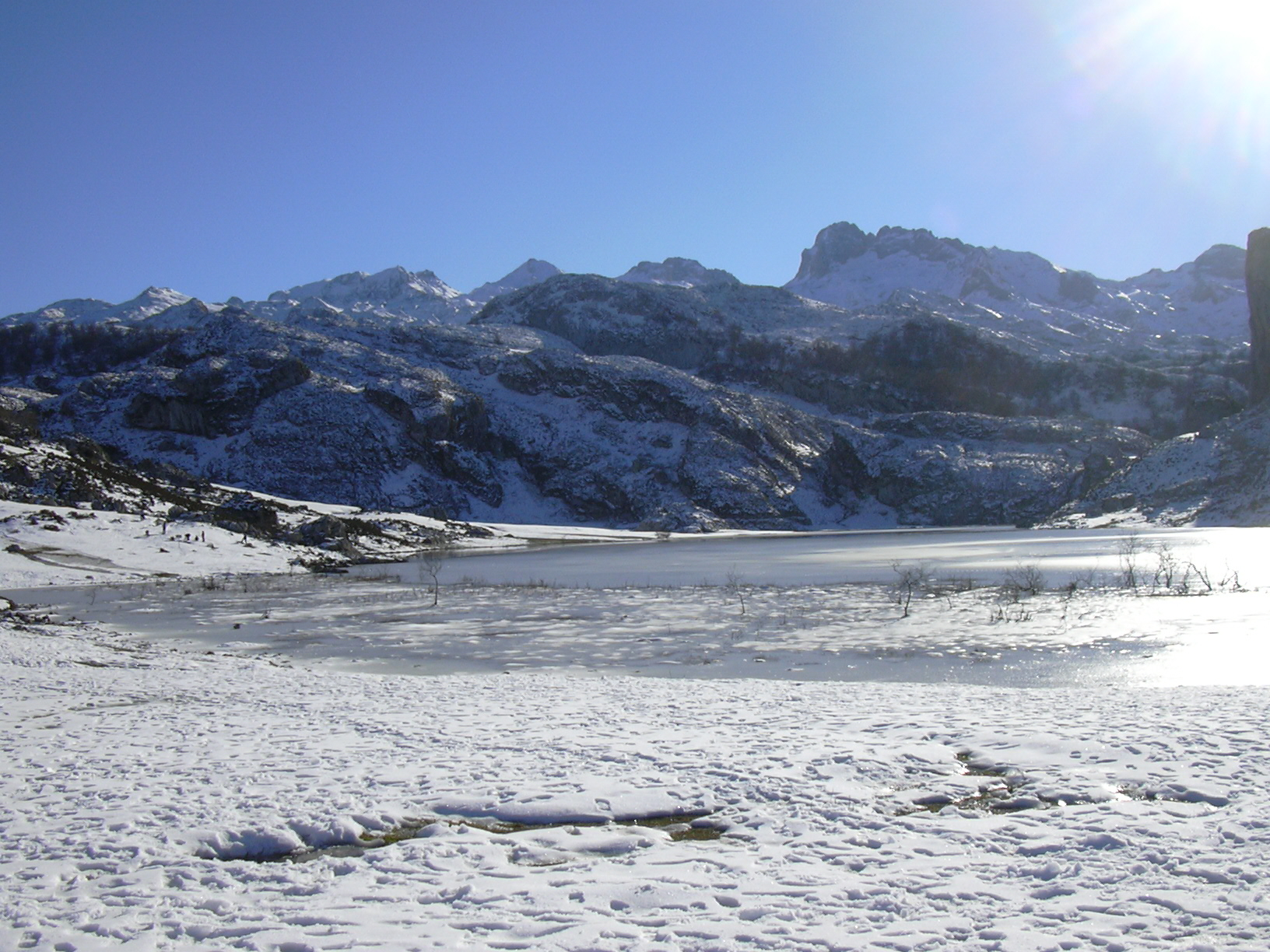
Lago Ercina in winter

The Lakes of Covadonga (el. 1134 m.) (Spanish: Lagos de Covadonga) are two glacial lakes located on the region of Asturias, Spain. These lakes, often also called Lakes of Enol or simply Los Lagos, are Lake Enol and Lake Ercina located in the Picos de Europa range and they are the original center of the Picos de Europa National Park, created in 1918. They are near the Covadonga Sanctuary.

Lake Enol is situated approximately 10 km from Covadonga and 25 km from Cangas de Onís. A curving road is available from Arriondas to the lake. Measuring 0.1 square kilometres (0.039 sq mi), it is one of the biggest lakes in the area. Lake Enol is situated 1,070 metres (3,510 ft) above sea level.

A submerged image of the Virgin Mary is elevated every year on 8 September and then taken out for a procession. Regional dancing occurs at Lake Enol during the Fiesta del Pastor on 25 July.

Lake Ercina is situated at an altitude of 1,108 metres (3,635 ft) and its maximum depth is just over 2 metres (6 ft 7 in). The eutrophic lake covers approximately 8 hectares (20 acres).

== Vuelta a España ==
The road ascending from Covadonga to the lakes is a popular climb in professional road bicycle racing, having been used by Vuelta a España many times in the last 25 years.

Together with Alto de l'Angliru, Lagos de Covadonga is the most important climb in the modern history of the Vuelta. The road that leads to the lakes starts at Covadonga and is 12.6 kilometres long at an average gradient of 7.3% (height gain: 1056 m). The most demanding section is La Huesera, 7 kilometres from the top of the climb, with an average gradient of 15% during 800 meters. It was featured for the first time in 1983 with the victory of Marino Lejarreta, who was in a fierce battle with Bernard Hinault for overall victory. This was the same Vuelta that saw Hinault, Greg LeMond and Laurent Fignon all riding on the same team. Stage 7 of the 2023 La Vuelta Femenina ended at Lagos de Covadonga, with Dutch cyclist Demi Vollering placing first.

=== Winners of the Lakes of Covadonga stage - Men ===
| Year | Name | Country |
|---|---|---|
| 1983 | Marino Lejarreta | Spain |
| 1984 | Raimund Dietzen | Germany |
| 1985 | Pedro Delgado | Spain |
| 1986 | Robert Millar | United Kingdom |
| 1987 | Lucho Herrera | Colombia |
| 1989 | Álvaro Pino | Spain |
| 1991 | Lucho Herrera | Colombia |
| 1992 | Pedro Delgado | Spain |
| 1993 | Oliverio Rincón | Colombia |
| 1994 | Laurent Jalabert | France |
| 1996 | Laurent Jalabert | France |
| 1997 | Pavel Tonkov | Russia |
| 2000 | Andrei Zintchenko | Russia |
| 2001 | Juan Miguel Mercado | Spain |
| 2005 | Eladio Jiménez | Spain |
| 2007 | Vladimir Efimkin | Russia |
| 2010 | Carlos Barredo | Spain |
| 2012 | Antonio Piedra | Spain |
| 2014 | Przemysław Niemiec | Poland |
| 2016 | Nairo Quintana | Colombia |
| 2018 | Thibaut Pinot | France |
| 2021 | Primož Roglič | Slovenia |
| 2024 | Marc Soler | Spain |

=== Winners of the Lakes of Covadonga stage - Women ===
| Year | Name | Country |
|---|---|---|
| 2023 | Demi Vollering | Netherlands |
