= Salassa =

- Comune
- Comune di Salassa
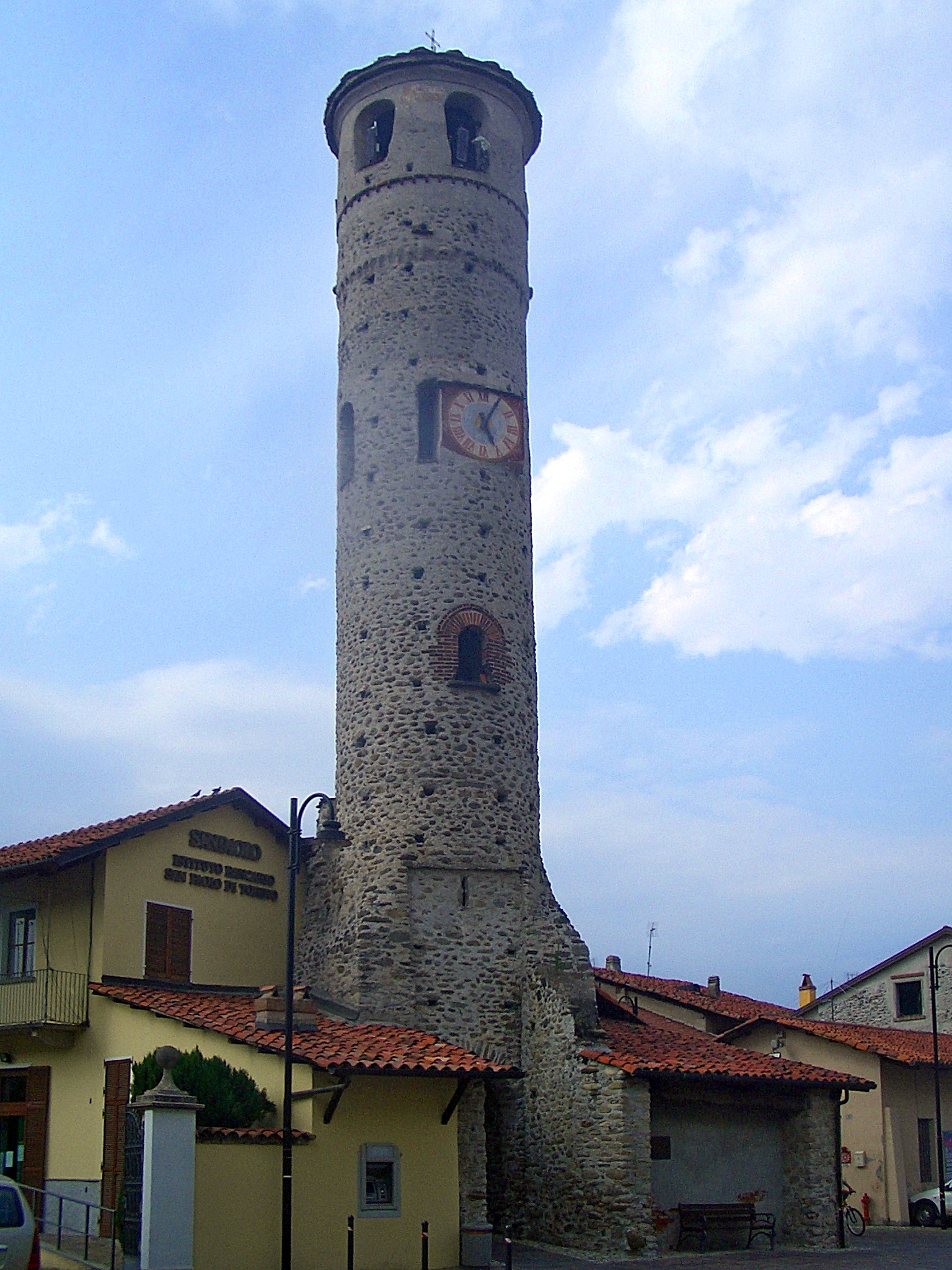
- The cylindrical tower-gate

- Coat of arms

- Location within Italy Location within Piedmont
- Coordinates: 45°22′N 7°41′E
- Country: Italy
- Region: Piedmont
- Metropolitan city: Turin (TO)
- Frazioni: Borgata Valleri, Cascina Fenale, Pianter, Regione Burone

Government
  - Mayor: Sergio Angelo Gelmini

Area
  - Total: 4.95 km^{2} (1.91 sq mi)
- Elevation: 361 m (1,184 ft)

Population (1-1-2017)
  - Total: 1,872
  - Density: 378/km^{2} (979/sq mi)
- Demonym: Salassese(i)
- Time zone: UTC+1 (CET)
  - Summer (DST): UTC+2 (CEST)
- Postal code: 10080
- Dialing code: 0124
- Website: Official website

Salassa is a comune (municipality) in the Metropolitan City of Turin in the Italian region Piedmont, located about 35 kilometres (22 mi) north of Turin in the Canavese traditional region.

The 5th Stage of the 2023 Giro Donne began at Salassa on the 4th of July.

== Main sights ==
- 13th-century cylindrical (with rectangular base) tower-gate, standing at 24 m.
- Parish church of St. John the Baptist, in late Baroque-Neoclassical style.
