= Erica Magnaldi =

Italian racing cyclist (born 1992)

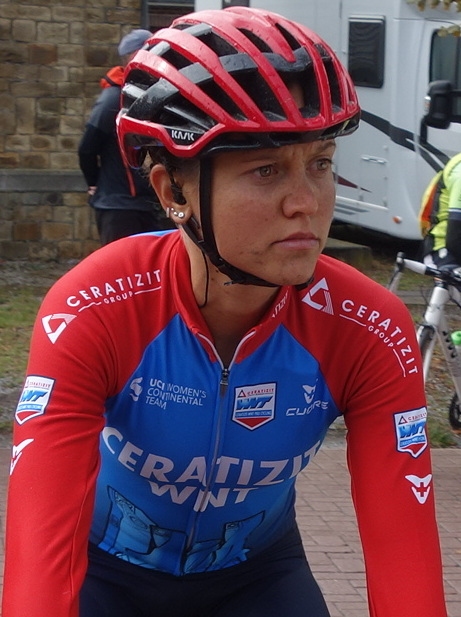
- Erica Magnaldi at the 2020 Flèche Wallonne

Personal information
- Full name: Erica Magnaldi
- Born: 24 August 1992 (age 34) Cuneo, Italy
- Height: 1.61 m (5 ft 3 in)
- Weight: 45 kg (99 lb)

Cycling career
- Sport: Cycling
- Current team: UAE Team L'Imad
- Discipline: Road
- Role: Rider
- Rider type: Climber

Professional teams
- 2017–2018: Bepink–Cogeas
- 2019–2021: WNT–Rotor Pro Cycling
- 2022–: UAE Team ADQ

Major wins
- Gravel European Championships (2025)

Erica Magnaldi [erika maˈɲaldi] (born 24 August 1992) is an Italian racing cyclist, who currently rides for UCI Women's WorldTeam UAE Team L'Imad. She rode in the women's road race event at the 2018 UCI Road World Championships.

== Major results ==
=== Gravel ===
2025
1st UEC European Championships

=== Road ===
2017
10th Giro dell'Emilia Internazionale Donne Elite
2018
4th Overall Tour of California
5th Overall Tour de Yorkshire
7th Overall Tour Cycliste Féminin International de l'Ardèche

1st Stage 2

10th La Course by Le Tour de France
2019
4th Overall Tour Cycliste Féminin International de l'Ardèche
6th Overall Setmana Ciclista Valenciana
8th Overall Giro della Toscana
10th Trofeo Alfredo Binda
2020
5th Emakumeen Nafarroako Klasikoa
8th Overall Setmana Ciclista Valenciana
2021
2nd La Périgord Ladies
7th Gran Premio Ciudad de Eibar
8th Durango-Durango Emakumeen Saria
9th Overall Tour de Suisse
9th Donostia San Sebastián Klasikoa
2022
1st Mountains classification, Setmana Ciclista Valenciana
8th Overall Giro d'Italia Donne
8th Overall Tour de Suisse
9th Overall Vuelta a Andalucía
10th Overall Tour of Scandinavia
2023
2nd Overall Tour Cycliste Féminin International de l'Ardèche
2nd Grand Prix Féminin de Chambéry
4th Vuelta CV Feminas
5th Overall Giro d'Italia Donne
8th Overall La Vuelta Femenina
8th Overall Tour de Romandie
8th Overall Vuelta a Burgos
9th Giro dell'Emilia
2024
3rd Grand Prix Féminin de Chambéry
6th Trofeo Oro in Euro
