= Trofeo Oro in Euro =

Women's cycling race in Italy

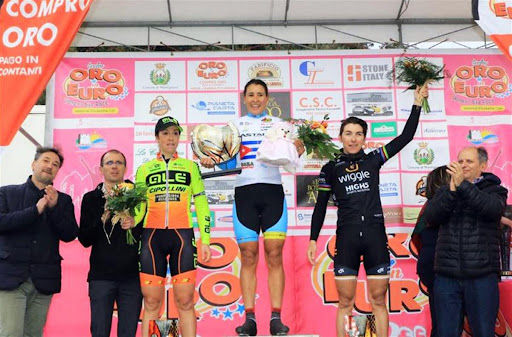
- Podium of the 2017 edition, won by Arlenis Sierra

Race details
- Date: March
- Region: Italy
- Local name: Trofeo Oro in Euro (Italian)
- Discipline: Road
- Type: One-day race
- Organiser: Montignoso Ciclismo
- Web site: www.montignosociclismo.org

History
- First edition: 2008
- Editions: 16 (as of 2025)
- First winner: Laura Doria (ITA)
- Most wins: Elisa Longo Borghini (ITA) (2)
- Most recent: Karlijn Swinkels (NED)

The Trofeo Oro in Euro is a one-day road cycling race held annually in Montignoso, Italy. First organized as a local race in 2008, it gained UCI classification as a 1.2 event in 2022 and was upgraded to 1.1 status in 2023.

In recent years, the race course features two climbs of Fortezza, which is 3.5 kilometres (2.2 mi) at an average gradient of 5.5%. Italian Elisa Longo Borghini is the only multiple-time winner, in 2012 and 2024.

== Winners ==
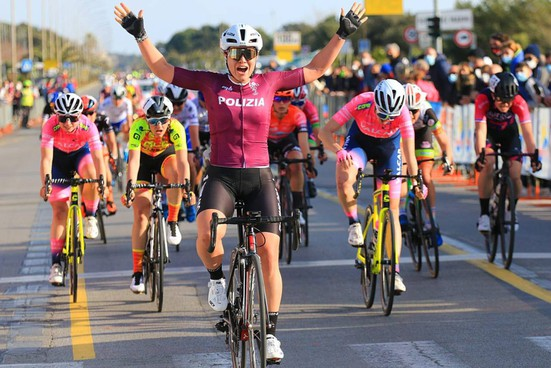
Rachele Barbieri won the 2021 edition in a sprint finish.

| Year | Country | Rider | Team |
|---|---|---|---|
| 2008 | Italy | Laura Doria | |
| 2009 | Switzerland | Jessica Schneeberger | |
| 2010 | Lithuania | Katarzina Sosna | |
| 2011 | No race | | |
| 2012 | Italy | Elisa Longo Borghini | Hitec Products–Mistral Home |
| 2013 | Russia | Tatiana Antoshina | MCipollini–Giordana |
| 2014 | Italy | Elena Berlato | |
| 2015 | Italy | Arianna Fidanza | Alé–Cipollini |
| 2016 | Italy | Sofia Bertizzolo | Astana |
| 2017 | Cuba | Arlenis Sierra | Astana |
| 2018 | Italy | Marta Bastianelli | Alé–Cipollini |
| 2019 | Italy | Laura Tomasi | Top Girls Fassa Bortolo |
| 2021 | Italy | Rachele Barbieri | |
| 2022 | Italy | Sofia Bertizzolo | UAE Team ADQ |
| 2023 | Italy | Gaia Realini | Trek–Segafredo |
| 2024 | Italy | Elisa Longo Borghini | Lidl–Trek |
| 2025 | Netherlands | Karlijn Swinkels | UAE Team ADQ |
