= Veronica Ewers =

American cyclist (born 1994)

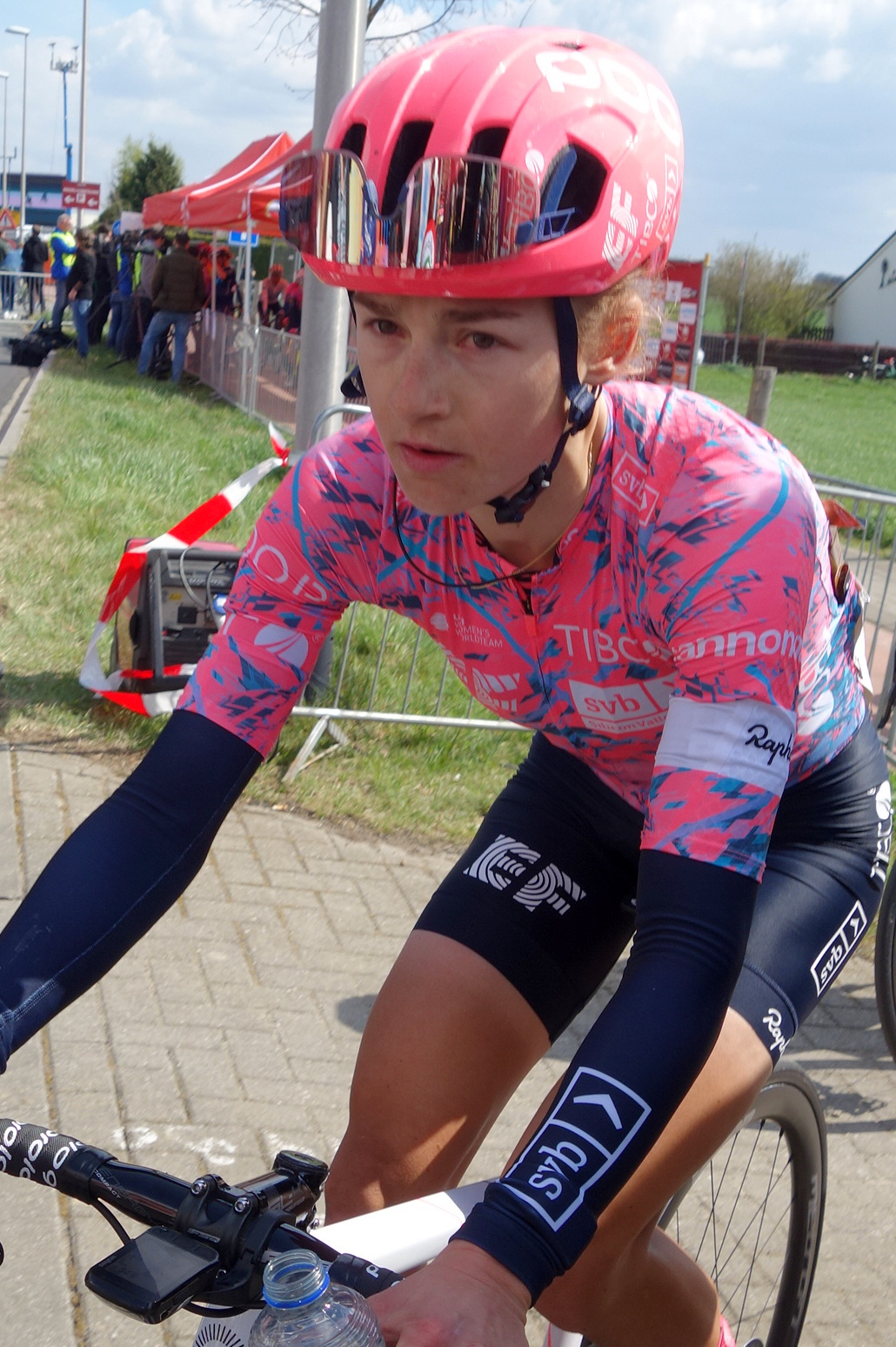
- Ewers at the 2022 Amstel Gold Race

Personal information
- Born: September 1, 1994 (age 32) Moscow, Idaho, USA

Cycling career
- Sport: Cycling
- Current team: EF Education–Oatly
- Discipline: Road
- Role: Rider

Professional teams
- 2021–2023: Tibco–Silicon Valley Bank
- 2024–: EF Education–Cannondale

Veronica Ewers (born September 1, 1994) is an American professional racing cyclist, who currently rides for UCI Women's Continental Team EF Education–Oatly.

== Major results ==
2021
2nd Overall Joe Martin Stage Race
3rd Road race, National Road Championships
5th Overall Tour Cycliste Féminin International de l'Ardèche
2022
1st Clasica Femenina Navarra
2nd Overall Grand Prix Elsy Jacobs

1st Stage 2

2nd Durango-Durango Emakumeen Saria
2nd Emakumeen Nafarroako Klasikoa
5th Overall Tour de Romandie
5th Time trial, National Road Championships
8th Overall The Women's Tour
9th Overall Tour de France
10th Overall Itzulia
2023
4th Overall Giro d'Italia Donne
