= Gaia Realini =

Italian cyclist

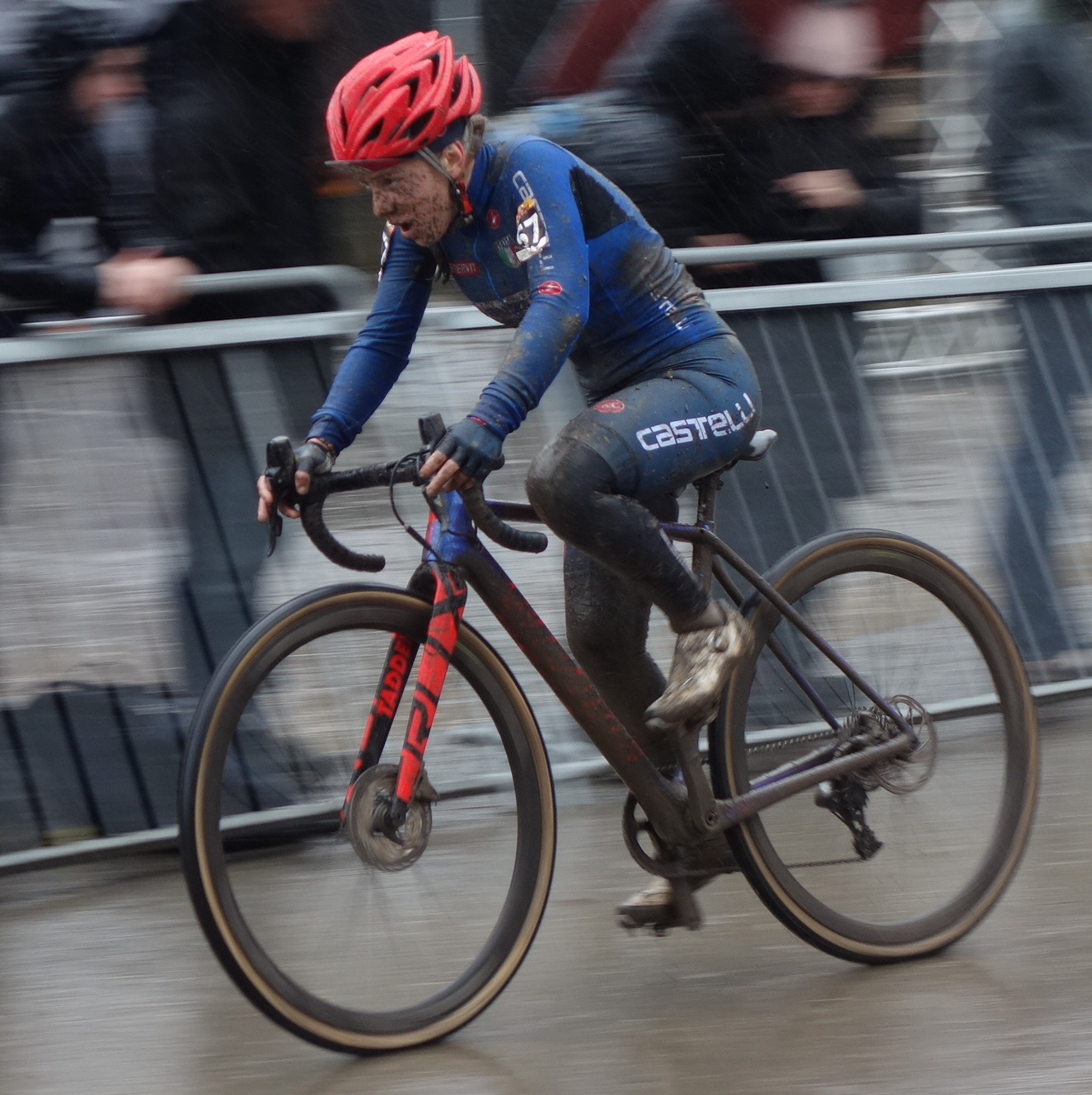
- Realini in 2019

Personal information
- Full name: Gaia Realini
- Born: 19 June 2001 (age 25) Pescara, Italy
- Height: 1.5 m (4 ft 11 in)

Cycling career
- Sport: Cycling
- Current team: Lidl–Trek
- Disciplines: Road; Cyclo-cross
- Role: Rider

Professional teams
- 2021–2022: Isolmant–Premac–Vittoria
- 2023–: Trek–Segafredo

Major wins
- Major Tours Giro Donne Young rider classification (2023) La Vuelta Femenina Mountains classification (2023) 1 individual stage (2023)
Medal record
Women's road bicycle racing
Representing Italy
World Championships
Bronze medal – third place	2024 Zurich	Mixed team relay

Gaia Realini (born 19 June 2001) is an Italian professional racing cyclist, who currently rides for UCI Women's WorldTour Team Lidl–Trek.

== Major results ==
=== Cyclo-cross ===
2019–2020
2nd Citta Di Jesolo
3rd National Under-23 Championships
3rd Saccolongo
3rd Fae' Di Oderzo
2020–2021
2nd National Under-23 Championships
2021–2022
1st Brugherio
2nd Illnau
2nd Citta Di Jesolo
3rd Cremona

=== Road ===
2021
1st Mountains classification, Giro Toscana Int. Femminile
5th Road race, UEC European Under-23 Road Championships
10th Grand Prix Féminin de Chambéry
2022
1st Overall Giro Mediterraneo in Rosa

1st Stage 2

1st Trofeo Città di Cesiomaggiore
1st Mountain Classification Giro Toscana Int. Femminile
5th Memorial Monica Bandini
2023
1st Trofeo Oro in Euro
2nd Overall UAE Tour

1st Young rider classification

3rd La Flèche Wallonne
3rd Overall La Vuelta Femenina

1st Mountains classification
1st Stage 6

3rd Overall Giro d'Italia Donne

1st Young rider classification

3rd Overall Tour de l'Avenir Femmes

1st Stage 4

4th Road race, National Road Championships
4th Giro dell'Emilia Internazionale Donne Elite
7th Liège–Bastogne–Liège Femmes
9th Overall Tour de Romandie Féminin
9th UCI Gravel World Championships
2024
1st Stage 1 (TTT) La Vuelta Femenina
2nd Overall Vuelta Extremadura Féminas
4th Overall UAE Tour
5th Overall Tour de France
5th Overall Setmana Ciclista Valenciana
7th Overall Giro d'Italia
7th Overall Tour de Suisse
10th Trofeo Oro in Euro
