= Elche de la Sierra =

Municipality of Spain

Coordinates: 38°27′N 2°03′W

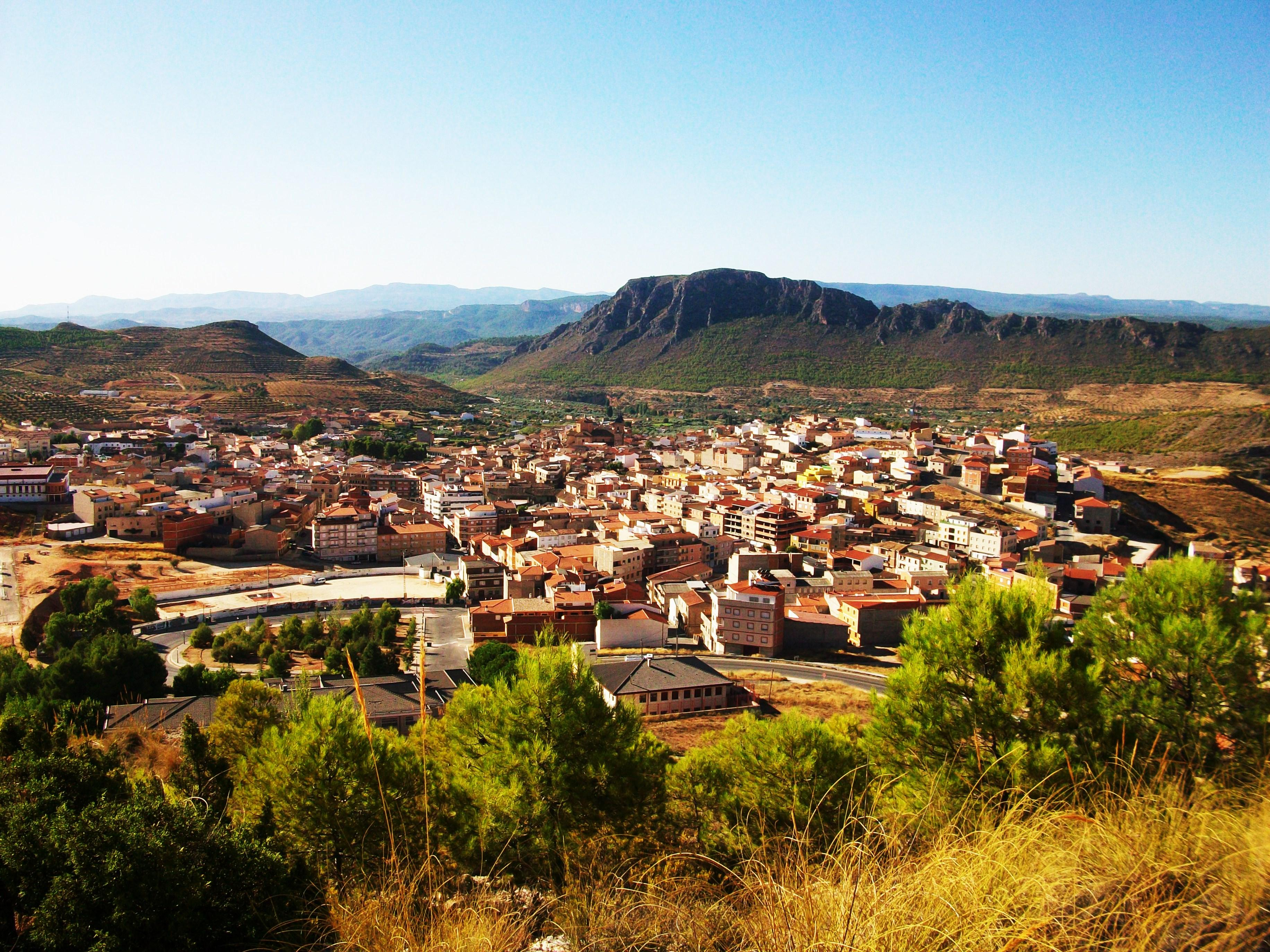

Coat of arms of Elche de la Sierra

Elche de la Sierra is a municipality in Albacete, Castile-La Mancha, Spain. This province belongs to the autonomous community of Castilla-La Mancha. It had a population of 3,943 at the beginning of 2010 as reported by the country's National Statistics Institute.

== Climate ==
Climate data for Albacete
Month	Jan	Feb	Mar	Apr	May	Jun	Jul	Aug	Sep	Oct	Nov	Dec	Year
Mean daily maximum °C (°F)	8 (46)	11 (52)	14 (57)	17 (63)	22 (72)	27 (81)	31 (88)	32 (90)	26 (79)	20 (68)	13 (55)	9 (48)	19 (66)
Daily mean °C (°F)	4 (39)	5 (41)	8 (46)	11 (52)	15 (59)	19 (66)	23 (73)	24 (75)	19 (66)	14 (57)	8 (46)	4 (39)	13 (55)
Mean daily minimum °C (°F)	0 (32)	0 (32)	2 (36)	5 (41)	8 (46)	12 (54)	16 (61)	16 (61)	12 (54)	8 (46)	3 (37)	0 (32)	7 (45)
Average precipitation mm (inches)	21 (0.8)	24 (0.9)	28 (1.1)	48 (1.9)	48 (1.9)	36 (1.4)	12 (0.5)	14 (0.6)	32 (1.3)	42 (1.7)	34 (1.3)	28 (1.1)	367 (14.4)
Average precipitation days (≥ 1 mm)	2	3	4	5	5	4	1	0	4	4	4	2	38
Source: Weatherbase "Albacete, Spain". Weatherbase. November 2010.

== Notable people ==
- Juan Belencoso, footballer

== See also ==
- List of municipalities in Albacete
- Church of Santa Quiteria
