= Riaza =

- Municipality
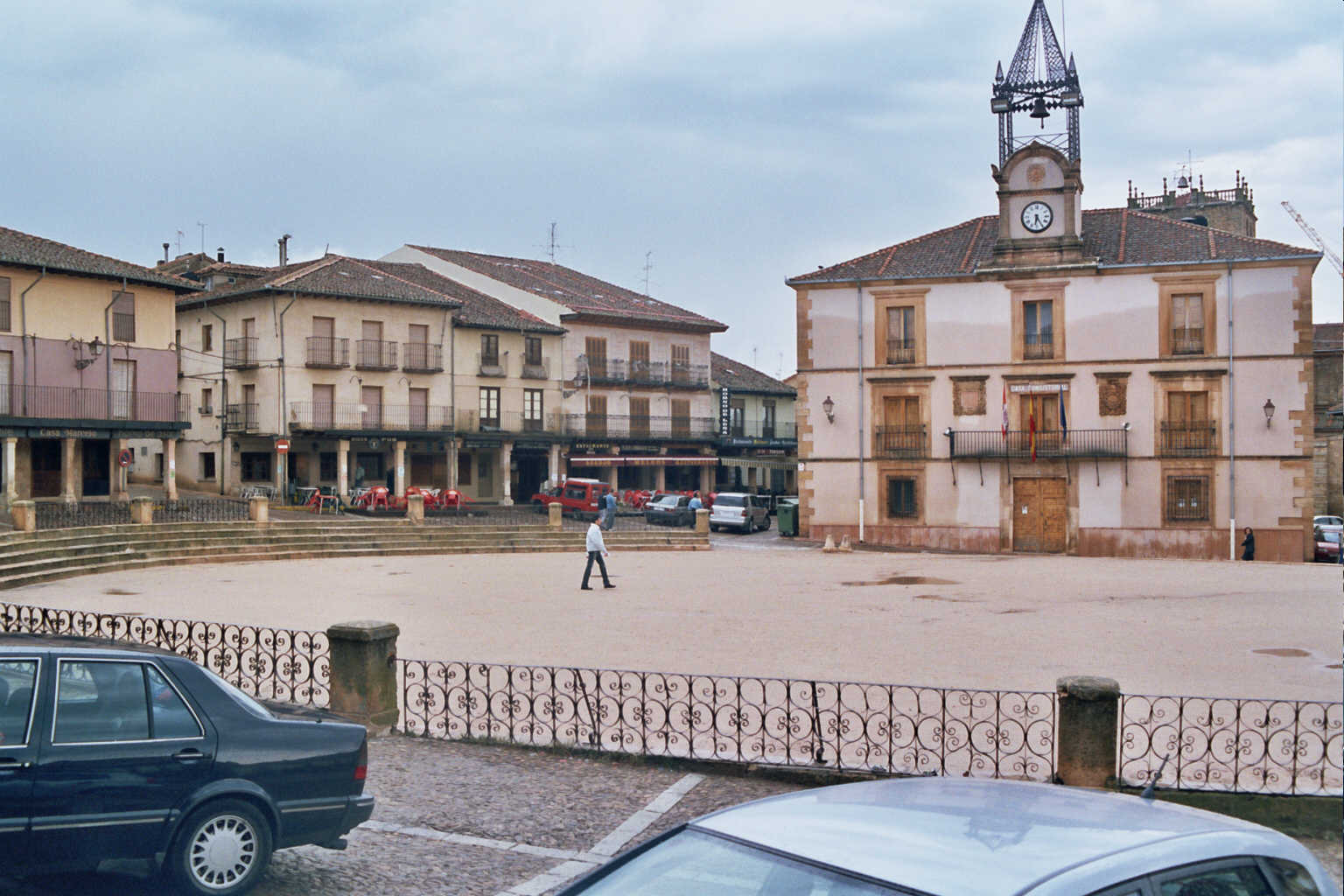
- Main square and town hall of Riaza

- Coat of arms

- Location in Spain. Riaza (Spain)
- Coordinates: 41°16′47″N 3°28′38″W
- Country: Spain
- Autonomous community: Castile and León
- Province: Segovia
- Municipality: Riaza

Area
  - Total: 149.49 km^{2} (57.72 sq mi)
- Elevation: 1,190 m (3,900 ft)

Population (2025-01-01)
  - Total: 2,128
  - Density: 14.24/km^{2} (36.87/sq mi)
- Time zone: UTC+1 (CET)
  - Summer (DST): UTC+2 (CEST)
- Website: Official website

Riaza is a municipality located in the province of Segovia, Castile and León, Spain. According to the 2004 census (INE), the municipality had a population of 2,020 inhabitants.
