= 2026 UCI Road World Championships – Women's time trial =

Cycling event

Women's time trial
2026 UCI Road World Championships

Race details
- Dates: 20 September 2026
- Distance: 39.2 km (24.4 mi)
- Winning time: 50' 24"

Medalists
	Gold	(Switzerland) Marlen Reusser (SUI)
	Silver	(United Kingdom) Zoe Backstedt (GBR)
	Bronze	(Germany) Franziska Koch (GER)

The Women's time trial of the 2026 UCI Road World Championships was a cycling event that took place on 20 September 2026 in Montreal, Canada. It was the 33rd edition of the championship, for which Marlen Reusser of Switzerland was the defending champion, having won in 2025.

The race was won by Swiss rider Marlen Reusser for the second year in a row, beating British rider Zoe Bäckstedt by 40 seconds, with German rider Franziska Koch a further 5 seconds slower.

== Course ==
For the first time since 2022, the time trial course for elite men and women was identical in length – a 39.2-kilometre (24.4-mile) route through Montreal, racing along the Saint Lawrence River, crossing the St. Lawrence River, passing through the Circuit Gilles Villeneuve, and returning via the Concorde Bridge. It was the longest time trial to be tackled by elite women at the UCI Road World Championships.

== Final classification ==
Rank	Rider	Country	Time
1st place, gold medalist(s)	Marlen Reusser	Switzerland	50' 24"
2nd place, silver medalist(s)	Zoe Backstedt	Great Britain	+ 40"
3rd place, bronze medalist(s)	Franziska Koch	Germany	+ 45"
4	Elisa Longo Borghini	Italy	+ 50"
5	Cedrine Kerbaol	France	+ 1' 10"
6	Lotte Kopecky	Belgium	+ 1' 47"
7	Antonia Niedermaier	Germany	+ 1' 49"
8	Demi Vollering	Netherlands	+ 1' 49"
9	Dominika Wlodarczyk	Poland	+ 1' 59"
10	Vittoria Guazzini	Italy	+ 2' 05"
11	Lotte Claes	Belgium	+ 2' 09"
12	Lieke Nooijen	Netherlands	+ 2' 16"
13	Taylor Knibb	United States	+ 2' 18"
14	Lauretta Hanson	Australia	+ 2' 19"
15	Juliette Berthet	France	+ 2' 50"
16	Anna Morris	Great Britain	+ 2' 56"
17	Christina Schweinberger	Austria	+ 3' 02"
18	Paula Blasi	Spain	+ 3' 05"
19	Nadia Gontova	Canada	+ 3' 13"
20	Mireia Benito	Spain	+ 3' 37"
21	Kristen Faulkner	United States	+ 3' 40"
22	Anniina Ahtosalo	Finland	+ 4' 15"
23	Olivia Baril	Canada	+ 4' 46"
24	Nika Bobnar	Slovenia	+ 5' 01"
25	Teniel Campbell	Trinidad and Tobago	+ 5' 07"
26	Lucie de Marigny-Lagesse	Mauritius	+ 5' 38"
27	Valeriia Kononenko	Ukraine	+ 5' 40"
28	Romina Hinojosa	Mexico	+ 5' 42"
29	Ann-Christine Allik	Estonia	+ 5' 46"
30	Diana Peñuela	Colombia	+ 5' 56"
31	Bronwyn MacGregor	New Zealand	+ 6' 08"
32	Zhu Shimeng	China	+ 6' 25"
33	Sara Roel	Mexico	+ 7' 29"
34	Gergana Stoyanova	Bulgaria	+ 8' 11"
35	Tang Xin	China	+ 8' 19"
36	Faina Potapova	Kazakhstan	+ 8' 49"
37	Xaveline Nirere	Rwanda	+ 9' 17"
38	Diane Ingabire	Rwanda	+ 9' 45"
39	Magh Firotika Marenda	Indonesia	+ 11' 35"
40	Skye Davidson	Zimbabwe	+ 11' 37"
41	Mishael Alhazmi	Saudi Arabia	+ 12' 55"
42	Karin Abe	Japan	+ 13' 04"
43	Monica Kiplagat	Kenya	+ 16' 14"
44	Kendra Tabu	Kenya	+ 16' 51"
45	Alyssa Burgess	Cayman Islands	+ 18' 36"
46	Rongina Ngandu	Zimbabwe	+ 22' 38"
47	Sajedeh Siyahian	Iran	+ 28' 50"
