= 2022 UCI Road World Championships – Women's time trial =

Cycling race in New South Wales, Australia

Women's time trial
2022 UCI Road World Championships
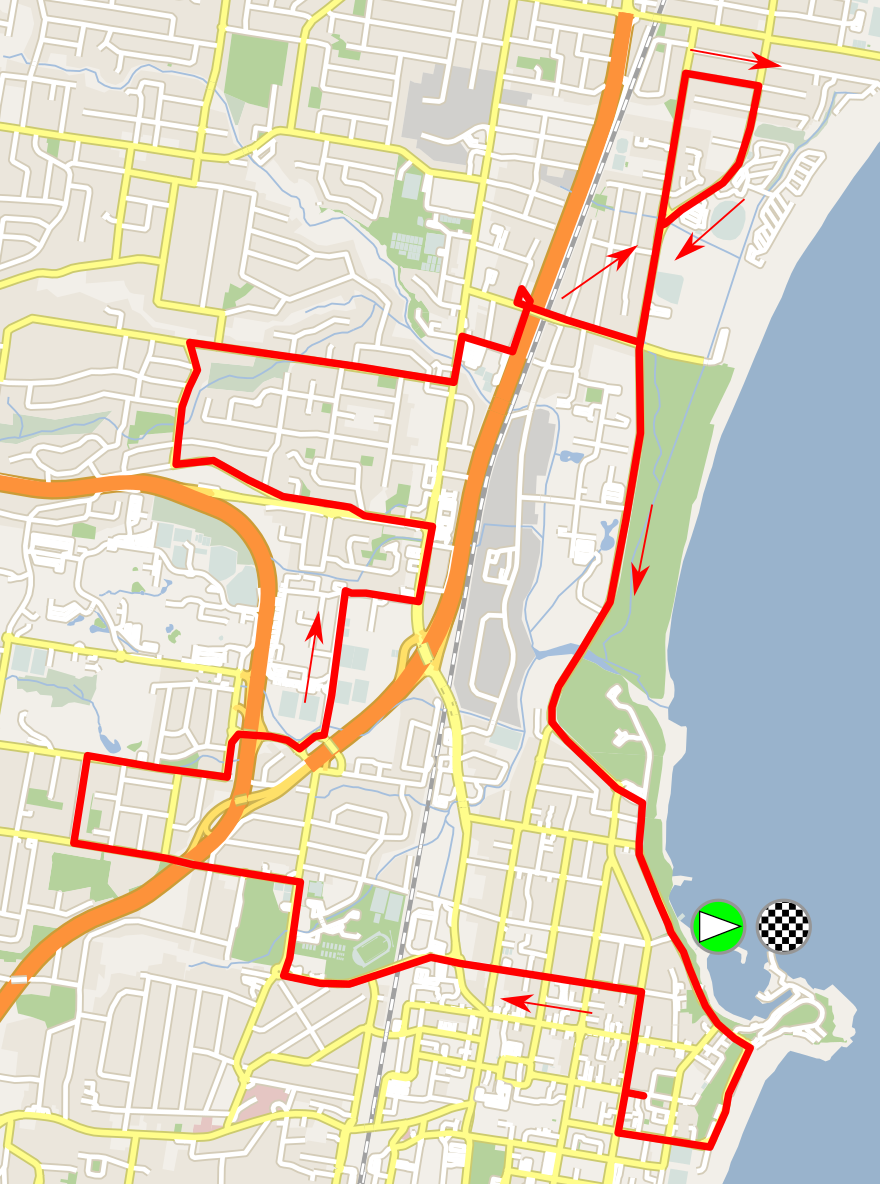

Race details
- Dates: 18 September 2022
- Distance: 34.2 km (21.3 mi)
- Winning time: 44:28

Medalists
	Gold	Ellen van Dijk (NED)
	Silver	Grace Brown (AUS)
	Bronze	Marlen Reusser (SUI)

The Women's time trial of the 2022 UCI Road World Championships was a cycling event that took place on 18 September 2022 at Wollongong, Australia.

== Final classification ==
Rank	Rider	Country	Time
1st place, gold medalist(s)	Ellen van Dijk	Netherlands	44' 28"
2nd place, silver medalist(s)	Grace Brown	Australia	+ 12"
3rd place, bronze medalist(s)	Marlen Reusser	Switzerland	+ 41"
4	Vittoria Guazzini	Italy	+ 52"
5	Leah Thomas	United States	+ 1' 18"
6	Kristen Faulkner	United States	+ 1' 25"
7	Annemiek van Vleuten	Netherlands	+ 1' 43"
8	Georgia Baker	Australia	+ 1' 46"
9	Lotte Kopecky	Belgium	+ 1' 50"
10	Anna Kiesenhofer	Austria	+ 1' 56"
11	Juliette Labous	France	+ 2' 04"
12	Mieke Kröger	Germany	+ 2' 28"
13	Shirin van Anrooij	Netherlands	+ 2' 40"
14	Emma Norsgaard	Denmark	+ 2' 48"
15	Julie Leth	Denmark	+ 2' 53"
16	Ashleigh Moolman	South Africa	+ 3' 00"
17	Leah Kirchmann	Canada	+ 3' 03"
18	Ricarda Bauernfeind	Germany	+ 3' 09"
19	Olga Zabelinskaya	Uzbekistan	+ 3' 31"
20	Marie Le Net	France	+ 3' 35"
21	Marta Jaskulska	Poland	+ 3' 40"
22	Julie Van de Velde	Belgium	+ 3' 41"
23	Arianna Fidanza	Italy	+ 3' 41"
24	Omer Shapira	Israel	+ 4' 01"
25	Agnieszka Skalniak-Sójka	Poland	+ 4' 16"
26	Elena Hartmann	Switzerland	+ 5' 01"
27	Alison Jackson	Canada	+ 5' 01"
28	Urška Žigart	Slovenia	+ 5' 12"
29	Ella Wyllie	New Zealand	+ 5' 28"
30	Lina Hernández	Colombia	+ 5' 30"
31	Sandra Alonso	Spain	+ 6' 19"
32	Lourdes Oyarbide	Spain	+ 6' 22"
33	Maude Le Roux	South Africa	+ 7' 22"
34	Leung Wing Yee	Hong Kong	+ 7' 26"
35	Nora Jenčušová	Slovakia	+ 7' 42"
36	Luciana Roland	Argentina	+ 8' 31"
37	Maryna Varenyk	Ukraine	+ 9' 02"
38	Nesrine Houili	Algeria	+ 10' 15"
39	Safia Al-Sayegh	United Arab Emirates	+ 13' 45"
40	Rabia Garib	Pakistan	+ 21' 36"
41	Zainab Rizwan	Pakistan	+ 23' 01"
	Catalina Soto	Chile	DNF
	Christina Schweinberger	Austria	DNS
