= 2022 UCI Road World Championships – Mixed team relay =

Cycling event

Mixed team relay
2022 UCI Road World Championships

Race details
- Dates: 21 September 2022
- Distance: 28.2 km (17.52 mi)
- Winning time: 33:47.17

Medalists
	Gold	Switzerland
	Silver	Italy
	Bronze	Australia

The mixed team relay of the 2022 UCI Road World Championships was a cycling event that took place on 21 September 2022 in Wollongong, Australia. It was won by Switzerland.

== Final classification ==
Rank	Riders	Team	Time	Behind
1st place, gold medalist(s)	Mauro Schmid; Stefan Küng; Stefan Bissegger; Elise Chabbey; Marlen Reusser; Nicole Koller	Switzerland	33:47.17	–
2nd place, silver medalist(s)	Edoardo Affini; Matteo Sobrero; Filippo Ganna; Elisa Longo Borghini; Elena Cecchini; Vittoria Guazzini	Italy	33:50.09	+2.92
3rd place, bronze medalist(s)	Michael Matthews; Luke Plapp; Luke Durbridge; Georgia Baker; Alexandra Manly; Sarah Roy	Australia	34:25.57	+38.40
4	Miguel Heidemann; Jannik Steimle; Nikias Arndt; Liane Lippert; Mieke Kröger; Romy Kasper	Germany	34:33.06	+45.89
5	Bauke Mollema; Mathieu van der Poel; Daan Hoole; Riejanne Markus; Annemiek van Vleuten; Ellen van Dijk	Netherlands	34:39.10	+51.93
6	Magnus Cort Nielsen; Mikkel Frølich Honoré; Mikkel Bjerg; Julie Leth; Rebecca Koerner; Emma Norsgaard	Denmark	34:45.57	+58.40
7	Eddy Le Huitouze; Bruno Armirail; Rémi Cavagna; Aude Biannic; Coralie Demay; Juliette Labous	France	34:45.89	+58.72
8	Nathan Van Hooydonck; Quinten Hermans; Pieter Serry; Julie De Wilde; Jesse Vandenbulcke; Valerie Demey	Belgium	35:36.61	+1:49.44
9	Mateusz Gajdulewicz; Maciej Bodnar; Kacper Gieryk; Dominika Włodarczyk; Agnieszka Skalniak-Sójka; Marta Jaskulska	Poland	35:38.75	+1:51.58
10	Oier Lazkano; Raúl García Pierna; Ivan Romeo Abad; Lourdes Oyarbide; Sandra Alonso; Idoia Eraso	Spain	36:31.16	+2:43.99
11	Tobias Bayer; Sebastian Schönberger; Felix Gall; Christina Schweinberger; Anna Kiesenhofer; Carina Schrempf	Austria	37:17.47	+3:30.30
12	Vitaliy Buts; Mykhaylo Kononenko; Vitaliy Novakovskyi; Daryna Nahuliak; Maryna Varenyk; Iryna Semenova	Ukraine	38:38.66	+4:51.49
13	Hamza Amari (ALG); Negasi Haylu Abreha (ETH); Kiya Rogora (ETH); Selam Amha Gerefiel (ETH); Maude Elaine le Roux (RSA); Nesrine Houili (ALG)	World Cycling Centre	38:46.28	+4:59.11
14	Taruia Krainer; Kahiri Endeler; Teva Poulain; Élodie Touffet; Kylie Crawford; Tekau Hapairai	Tahiti	40:50.22	+7:03.05
15	Rayann Lacheny; Florian Barket; David Schavits; Manon Brasseur; Sandra Gayral; Patricia Thémereau	New Caledonia	42:08.77	+8:21.60
16	Raea Khan; Wally Collins; Gideon Mulitalo; Pearl Harris-Blain; Jordan Afoa; Urlin Mulitalo	Samoa	51:45.63	+17:58.46
