= 2023 European Road Championships – Women's time trial =

Women's elite time trial
2023 European Road Championships

Race details
- Dates: 20 September 2023
- Stages: 1
- Distance: 28.6 km (17.8 mi)
- Winning time: 35:53.53

Medalists
	Gold	Marlen Reusser (SUI)
	Silver	Anna Henderson (GBR)
	Bronze	Christina Schweinberger (AUT)

The women's elite time trial at the 2023 European Road Championships took place on 20 September 2023, in Drenthe, the Netherlands.

Marlen Reusser won the race for the third straight year.

== Results ==
Rank	#	Cyclist	Nation	Time	Diff.
1st place, gold medalist(s)	1	Marlen Reusser	Switzerland	35:53.53	
2nd place, silver medalist(s)	6	Anna Henderson	Great Britain	36:36.89	+00:43.36
3rd place, bronze medalist(s)	4	Christina Schweinberger	Austria	36:37.58	+00:44.05
4	18	Audrey Cordon-Ragot	France	36:41.14	+00:47.61
5	3	Lotte Kopecky	Belgium	36:42.01	+00:48.48
6	17	Anna Kiesenhofer	Austria	36:49.02	+00:55.49
7	2	Riejanne Markus	Netherlands	36:53.75	+01:00.22
8	25	Eugenia Bujak	Slovenia	37:02.27	+01:08.74
9	21	Elinor Barker	Great Britain	37:05.13	+01:11.60
10	11	Valeriya Kononenko	Ukraine	37:15.38	+01:21.85
11	30	Katharina Fox	Germany	37:20.48	+01:26.95
12	14	Lisa Klein	Germany	37:27.47	+01:33.94
13	12	Kelly Murphy	Ireland	37:29.76	+01:36.23
14	20	Cecilie Uttrup Ludwig	Denmark	37:30.06	+01:36.53
15	24	Marta Jaskulska	Poland	37:30.83	+01:37.30
16	8	Emma Norsgaard	Denmark	37:32.20	+01:38.67
17	7	Katarzyna Niewiadoma	Poland	37:35.55	+01:42.02
18	5	Juliette Labous	France	37:39.21	+01:45.68
19	15	Shirin van Anrooij	Netherlands	37:40.64	+01:47.11
20	9	Vittoria Guazzini	Italy	37:41.87	+01:48.34
21	19	Dana Rožlapa	Latvia	37:43.51	+01:49.98
22	23	Alessia Vigilia	Italy	37:51.59	+01:58.06
23	16	Sara Van de Vel	Belgium	38:11.83	+02:18.30
24	10	Mireia Benito	Spain	38:37.37	+02:43.84
25	28	Yuliia Biriukova	Ukraine	39:21.50	+03:27.97
26	27	Rotem Gafinovitz	Israel	39:27.49	+03:33.96
27	13	Hafdís Sigurðardóttir	Iceland	40:01.70	+04:08.17
28	26	Sandra Alonso	Spain	40:31.58	+04:38.05
29	22	Denisa Slámová	Czech Republic	40:44.14	+04:50.61
30	29	Kristin Edda Sveinsdóttir	Iceland	40:53.61	+05:00.08
