= 2025 Tour de Suisse Women =

2025 UCI Women's World Tour, race 19 of 27

Race details
- Dates: 12–15 June 2025
- Stages: 4
- Distance: 509.7 km (316.7 mi)
- Winning time: 13h 03' 00"

Results
Jersey awarded to the overall winner	Winner	Marlen Reusser (SUI)	(Movistar Team)
	Second	Demi Vollering (NED)	(FDJ–Suez)
	Third	Katarzyna Niewiadoma (POL)	(Canyon//SRAM zondacrypto)
Jersey awarded to the points classification winner	Points	Marlen Reusser (SUI)	(Movistar Team)
Jersey awarded to the mountains classification winner	Mountains	Marta Lach (POL)	(Team SD Worx–Protime)
Jersey awarded to the youth classification winner	Youth	Marion Bunel (FRA)	(Visma–Lease a Bike)
	Team	(United States) Lidl–Trek	

The 2025 Tour de Suisse Women was a women's road cycling stage race held in Switzerland from 12 to 15 June. It was the ninth edition of the Tour de Suisse Women and the nineteenth event of the 2025 UCI Women's World Tour calendar. In 2025, the race took place prior to the men's Tour de Suisse, with both races sharing a 129.4 km (80.4 mi) stage in Küssnacht.

The defending champion was Dutch rider Demi Vollering of FDJ–Suez. Before the race, the favourites were Vollering and Swiss rider Marlen Reusser of Movistar Team.

The race was won by Reusser, beating Vollering by 36 seconds. Reusser won stages 1 and 4, as well as the points classification. Third overall was Katarzyna Niewiadoma of Canyon//SRAM zondacrypto, 1 minute 56 seconds behind Reusser. The mountains classification was won by Marta Lach of Team SD Worx–Protime, the youth classification was won by Marion Bunel of Visma–Lease a Bike and the team classification was won by Lidl–Trek.

== Teams ==
Twelve UCI Women's WorldTeams, one UCI Women's ProTeam and five UCI Women's Continental Teams participated in the race.

UCI Women's WorldTeams

- AG Insurance–Soudal
- Canyon//SRAM zondacrypto
- Ceratizit Pro Cycling
- Fenix–Deceuninck
- FDJ–Suez
- Lidl–Trek
- Liv AlUla Jayco
- Movistar Team
- Roland Le Dévoluy
- Team Picnic–PostNL
- Team SD Worx–Protime
- Visma–Lease a Bike

UCI Women's ProTeams

- EF Education–Oatly

UCI Women's Continental Teams

- Aromitalia 3T Vaiano
- BePink–Imatra–Bongioanni
- DAS–Hutchinson
- DD Group Pro Cycling Team
- Nexetis

== Route and stages ==
Stage characteristics
Stage	Date	Course	Distance	Type	Stage winner
1	12 June	Gstaad to Gstaad	95.5 km (59.3 mi)	Mountain stage	Marlen Reusser (SUI)
2	13 June	Gstaad to Oberkirch	161.7 km (100.5 mi)	Hilly stage	Amber Kraak (NED)
3	14 June	Oberkirch to Küssnacht	123.1 km (76.5 mi)	Hilly stage	Elisa Balsamo (ITA)
4	15 June	Küssnacht to Küssnacht	129.4 km (80.4 mi)	Hilly stage	Marlen Reusser (SUI)
Total			509.7 km (316.7 mi)		

== Stages ==
=== Stage 1 ===
12 June 2025 — Gstaad to Gstaad, 95.5 km (59.3 mi)

Stage 1 Result
Rank	Rider	Team	Time
1	Marlen Reusser (SUI)	Movistar Team	2h 29' 32"
2	Demi Vollering (NED)	FDJ–Suez	+ 0"
3	Katarzyna Niewiadoma (POL)	Canyon//SRAM zondacrypto	+ 1' 42"
4	Niamh Fisher-Black (NZL)	Lidl–Trek	+ 1' 42"
5	Urška Žigart (SLO)	AG Insurance–Soudal	+ 1' 42"
6	Noemi Rüegg (SUI)	EF Education–Oatly	+ 2' 14"
7	Elise Chabbey (SUI)	FDJ–Suez	+ 2' 14"
8	Yara Kastelijn (NED)	Fenix–Deceuninck	+ 2' 14"
9	Mireia Benito (ESP)	AG Insurance–Soudal	+ 2' 14"
10	Mareille Meijering (NED)	Movistar Team	+ 2' 14"

General classification after Stage 1
Rank	Rider	Team	Time
1	Marlen Reusser (SUI)	Movistar Team	2h 29' 17"
2	Demi Vollering (NED)	FDJ–Suez	+ 4"
3	Katarzyna Niewiadoma (POL)	Canyon//SRAM zondacrypto	+ 1' 51"
4	Niamh Fisher-Black (NZL)	Lidl–Trek	+ 1' 57"
5	Urška Žigart (SLO)	AG Insurance–Soudal	+ 1' 57"
6	Noemi Rüegg (SUI)	EF Education–Oatly	+ 2' 29"
7	Elise Chabbey (SUI)	FDJ–Suez	+ 2' 29"
8	Yara Kastelijn (NED)	Fenix–Deceuninck	+ 2' 29"
9	Mireia Benito (ESP)	AG Insurance–Soudal	+ 2' 29"
10	Mareille Meijering (NED)	Movistar Team	+ 2' 29"

=== Stage 2 ===
13 June 2025 — Gstaad to Oberkirch, 161.7 km (100.5 mi)

Stage 2 Result
Rank	Rider	Team	Time
1	Amber Kraak (NED)	FDJ–Suez	4h 14' 31"
2	Marta Lach (POL)	Team SD Worx–Protime	+ 1' 55"
3	Elise Chabbey (SUI)	FDJ–Suez	+ 2' 43"
4	Mavi García (ESP)	Liv AlUla Jayco	+ 2' 43"
5	Katarzyna Niewiadoma (POL)	Canyon//SRAM zondacrypto	+ 2' 43"
6	Marlen Reusser (SUI)	Movistar Team	+ 3' 13"
7	Demi Vollering (NED)	FDJ–Suez	+ 3' 13"
8	Noemi Rüegg (SUI)	EF Education–Oatly	+ 3' 13"
9	Eleonora Ciabocco (ITA)	Team Picnic–PostNL	+ 3' 13"
10	Yara Kastelijn (NED)	Fenix–Deceuninck	+ 3' 17"

General classification after Stage 2
Rank	Rider	Team	Time
1	Marlen Reusser (SUI)	Movistar Team	6h 47' 01"
2	Demi Vollering (NED)	FDJ–Suez	+ 4"
3	Katarzyna Niewiadoma (POL)	Canyon//SRAM zondacrypto	+ 1' 21"
4	Elise Chabbey (SUI)	FDJ–Suez	+ 1' 55"
5	Mavi García (ESP)	Liv AlUla Jayco	+ 1' 59"
6	Niamh Fisher-Black (NZL)	Lidl–Trek	+ 2' 01"
7	Urška Žigart (SLO)	AG Insurance–Soudal	+ 2' 01"
8	Noemi Rüegg (SUI)	EF Education–Oatly	+ 2' 29"
9	Eleonora Ciabocco (ITA)	Team Picnic–PostNL	+ 2' 29"
10	Yara Kastelijn (NED)	Fenix–Deceuninck	+ 2' 33"

=== Stage 3 ===
14 June 2025 — Oberkirch to Küssnacht, 123.1 km (76.5 mi)

Stage 3 Result
Rank	Rider	Team	Time
1	Elisa Balsamo (ITA)	Lidl–Trek	2h 56' 35"
2	Mischa Bredewold (NED)	Team SD Worx–Protime	+ 0"
3	Noemi Rüegg (SUI)	EF Education–Oatly	+ 1"
4	Agnieszka Skalniak-Sójka (POL)	Canyon//SRAM zondacrypto	+ 1"
5	Demi Vollering (NED)	FDJ–Suez	+ 1"
6	Marlen Reusser (SUI)	Movistar Team	+ 1"
7	Caroline Andersson (SWE)	Liv AlUla Jayco	+ 1"
8	Flora Perkins (GBR)	Fenix–Deceuninck	+ 1"
9	Kaja Rysz (POL)	Roland Le Dévoluy	+ 1"
10	Elise Chabbey (SUI)	FDJ–Suez	+ 1"

General classification after Stage 3
Rank	Rider	Team	Time
1	Marlen Reusser (SUI)	Movistar Team	9h 43' 35"
2	Demi Vollering (NED)	FDJ–Suez	+ 3"
3	Katarzyna Niewiadoma (POL)	Canyon//SRAM zondacrypto	+ 1' 23"
4	Elise Chabbey (SUI)	FDJ–Suez	+ 1' 57"
5	Mavi García (ESP)	Liv AlUla Jayco	+ 2' 01"
6	Niamh Fisher-Black (NZL)	Lidl–Trek	+ 2' 03"
7	Urška Žigart (SLO)	AG Insurance–Soudal	+ 2' 03"
8	Noemi Rüegg (SUI)	EF Education–Oatly	+ 2' 27"
9	Eleonora Ciabocco (ITA)	Team Picnic–PostNL	+ 2' 31"
10	Yara Kastelijn (NED)	Fenix–Deceuninck	+ 2' 35"

=== Stage 4 ===
15 June 2025 — Küssnacht to Küssnacht, 129.4 km (80.4 mi)

Stage 4 Result
Rank	Rider	Team	Time
1	Marlen Reusser (SUI)	Movistar Team	3h 19' 36"
2	Katarzyna Niewiadoma (POL)	Canyon//SRAM zondacrypto	+ 28"
3	Demi Vollering (NED)	FDJ–Suez	+ 28"
4	Cédrine Kerbaol (FRA)	EF Education–Oatly	+ 41"
5	Yara Kastelijn (NED)	Fenix–Deceuninck	+ 1' 11"
6	Niamh Fisher-Black (NZL)	Lidl–Trek	+ 1' 11"
7	Urška Žigart (SLO)	AG Insurance–Soudal	+ 1' 11"
8	Sarah Gigante (AUS)	AG Insurance–Soudal	+ 1' 15"
9	Isabella Holmgren (CAN)	Lidl–Trek	+ 1' 53"
10	Marion Bunel (FRA)	Visma–Lease a Bike	+ 1' 54"

General classification after Stage 4
Rank	Rider	Team	Time
1	Marlen Reusser (SUI)	Movistar Team	13h 03' 00"
2	Demi Vollering (NED)	FDJ–Suez	+ 36"
3	Katarzyna Niewiadoma (POL)	Canyon//SRAM zondacrypto	+ 1' 56"
4	Niamh Fisher-Black (NZL)	Lidl–Trek	+ 3' 25"
5	Urška Žigart (SLO)	AG Insurance–Soudal	+ 3' 25"
6	Cédrine Kerbaol (FRA)	EF Education–Oatly	+ 3' 27"
7	Yara Kastelijn (NED)	Fenix–Deceuninck	+ 3' 57"
8	Mavi García (ESP)	Liv AlUla Jayco	+ 4' 29"
9	Marion Bunel (FRA)	Visma–Lease a Bike	+ 4' 40"
10	Eleonora Ciabocco (ITA)	Team Picnic–PostNL	+ 4' 59"

== Classification leadership table ==
Classification leadership by stage
Stage	Winner	General classification	Points classification	Mountains classification	Young rider classification	Team classification
1	Marlen Reusser	Marlen Reusser	Marlen Reusser	Sarah Gigante	Eleonora Ciabocco	AG Insurance–Soudal
2	Amber Kraak	Marlen Reusser	Marlen Reusser	Marta Lach	Eleonora Ciabocco	FDJ–Suez
3	Elisa Balsamo	Marlen Reusser	Marlen Reusser	Marta Lach	Eleonora Ciabocco	FDJ–Suez
4	Marlen Reusser	Marlen Reusser	Marlen Reusser	Marta Lach	Marion Bunel	Lidl–Trek
Final		Marlen Reusser	Marlen Reusser	Marta Lach	Marion Bunel	Lidl–Trek

== Classification standings ==
Legend
Denotes the leader of the general classification	Denotes the leader of the mountains classification
Denotes the leader of the points classification	Denotes the leader of the young rider classification

=== General classification ===
General classification after stage 4 (1–10)
Rank	Rider	Team	Time
1	Marlen Reusser (SUI)	Movistar Team	13h 03' 00"
2	Demi Vollering (NED)	FDJ–Suez	+ 36"
3	Katarzyna Niewiadoma (POL)	Canyon//SRAM zondacrypto	+ 1' 56"
4	Niamh Fisher-Black (NZL)	Lidl–Trek	+ 3' 25"
5	Urška Žigart (SLO)	AG Insurance–Soudal	+ 3' 25"
6	Cédrine Kerbaol (FRA)	EF Education–Oatly	+ 3' 27"
7	Yara Kastelijn (NED)	Fenix–Deceuninck	+ 3' 57"
8	Mavi García (ESP)	Liv AlUla Jayco	+ 4' 29"
9	Marion Bunel (FRA)	Visma–Lease a Bike	+ 4' 40"
10	Eleonora Ciabocco (ITA)	Team Picnic–PostNL	+ 4' 59"

=== Points classification ===
Points classification after stage 4 (1–10)
Rank	Rider	Team	Points
1	Marlen Reusser (SUI)	Movistar Team	28
2	Demi Vollering (NED)	FDJ–Suez	22
3	Katarzyna Niewiadoma (POL)	Canyon//SRAM zondacrypto	16
4	Marta Lach (POL)	Team SD Worx–Protime	14
5	Amber Kraak (NED)	FDJ–Suez	12
6	Elisa Balsamo (ITA)	Lidl–Trek	12
7	Mischa Bredewold (NED)	Team SD Worx–Protime	8
8	Kristen Faulkner (USA)	EF Education–Oatly	6
9	Julia Borgström (SWE)	EF Education–Oatly	6
10	Elise Chabbey (SUI)	FDJ–Suez	6

=== Mountains classification ===
Mountains classification after stage 4 (1–10)
Rank	Rider	Team	Points
1	Marta Lach (POL)	Team SD Worx–Protime	24
2	Sarah Gigante (AUS)	AG Insurance–Soudal	22
3	Carina Schrempf (AUT)	Fenix–Deceuninck	17
4	Katarzyna Niewiadoma (POL)	Canyon//SRAM zondacrypto	12
5	Amber Kraak (NED)	FDJ–Suez	11
6	Kristen Faulkner (USA)	EF Education–Oatly	10
7	Marlen Reusser (SUI)	Movistar Team	10
8	Henrietta Christie (NZL)	EF Education–Oatly	9
9	Niamh Fisher-Black (NZL)	Lidl–Trek	8
10	Morgane Coston (FRA)	Roland Le Dévoluy	6

=== Young rider classification ===
Young rider classification after stage 4 (1–10)
Rank	Rider	Team	Time
1	Marion Bunel (FRA)	Visma–Lease a Bike	13h 07' 40"
2	Eleonora Ciabocco (ITA)	Team Picnic–PostNL	+ 19"
3	Isabella Holmgren (CAN)	Lidl–Trek	+ 1' 46"
4	Nienke Vinke (NED)	Team Picnic–PostNL	+ 3' 16"
5	Gaia Segato (ITA)	BePink–Imatra–Bongioanni	+ 5' 33"
6	Francesca Barale (ITA)	Team Picnic–PostNL	+ 8' 48"
7	Lore De Schepper (BEL)	AG Insurance–Soudal	+ 13' 17"
8	Rosita Reijnhout (NED)	Visma–Lease a Bike	+ 15' 15"
9	Morven Yeoman (GBR)	DAS–Hutchinson	+ 17' 09"
10	Justyna Czapla (GER)	Canyon//SRAM zondacrypto	+ 18' 27"

=== Team classification ===
Team classification after stage 4 (1–10)
Rank	Team	Time
1	(United States) Lidl–Trek	39h 25' 40"
2	(Belgium) AG Insurance–Soudal	+ 52"
3	(France) FDJ–Suez	+ 1' 33"
4	(Australia) Liv AlUla Jayco	+ 3' 31"
5	(Netherlands) Team Picnic–PostNL	+ 8' 41"
6	(United States) EF Education–Oatly	+ 9' 05"
7	(Netherlands) Visma–Lease a Bike	+ 15' 20"
8	(Germany) Canyon//SRAM zondacrypto	+ 15' 45"
9	(Netherlands) Team SD Worx–Protime	+ 21' 15"
10	(Switzerland) Roland Le Dévoluy	+ 36' 56"

== See also ==
- 2025 in women's road cycling
