= 2026 European Road Championships – Women's road race =

Women's road race
2026 European Road Championships

Race details
- Dates: 3 October 2026
- Stages: 1
- Distance: 129.9 km (80.7 mi)
- Winning time: 3:10:33

Medalists
	Gold	Demi Vollering (NED)
	Silver	Puck Pieterse (NED)
	Bronze	Marlen Reusser (SUI)

The women's elite road race at the 2026 European Road Championships took place on 3 October 2026, in Ljubljana, Slovenia.

== Results ==
Rank	#	Cyclist	Nation	Time / Diff.
1st place, gold medalist(s)	1	Demi Vollering	Netherlands	3:10:33
2nd place, silver medalist(s)	5	Puck Pieterse	Netherlands	+0:05
3rd place, bronze medalist(s)	33	Marlen Reusser	Switzerland	s.t.
4	12	Elisa Longo Borghini	Italy	s.t.
5	48	Antonia Niedermaier	Germany	+0:15
6	20	Katarzyna Niewiadoma	Poland	+0:45
7	37	Juliette Berthet	France	+0:59
8	46	Franziska Koch	Germany	+1:55
9	29	Usoa Ostolaza	Spain	s.t.
10	7	Femke de Vries	Netherlands	+1:56
11	43	Évita Muzic	France	s.t.
12	66	Cecilie Uttrup Ludwig	Denmark	s.t.
13	51	Audrey De Keersmaeker	Belgium	s.t.
14	30	Ginia Caluori	Switzerland	s.t.
15	72	Olha Kulynych	Ukraine	+2:00
16	34	Noemi Rüegg	Switzerland	+2:37
17	6	Karlijn Swinkels	Netherlands	s.t.
18	44	Maeva Squiban	France	s.t.
19	3	Riejanne Markus	Netherlands	s.t.
20	47	Liane Lippert	Germany	+2:41
21	42	Emilie Morier	France	+3:10
22	32	Steffi Häberlin	Switzerland	+3:16
23	11	Eleonora Gasparrini	Italy	s.t.
24	31	Lea Fuchs	Switzerland	s.t.
25	57	Katharina Sadnik	Austria	s.t.
26	67	Nina Berton	Luxembourg	+3:41
27	50	Lotte Claes	Belgium	s.t.
28	60	Julia Borgström	Sweden	+4:48
29	55	Tiril Jørgensen	Norway	+5:30
30	4	Lieke Nooijen	Netherlands	+6:49
31	52	Sandrine Tas	Belgium	s.t.
32	39	Cédrine Kerbaol	France	s.t.
33	54	Margot Vanpachtenbeke	Belgium	s.t.
34	35	Léa Stern	Switzerland	+7:10
35	70	Yuliia Biriukova	Ukraine	s.t.
36	22	Nikol Płosaj	Poland	s.t.
37	79	Rasa Leleivytė	Lithuania	s.t.
38	64	Solbjørk Anderson	Denmark	s.t.
39	58	Carina Schrempf	Austria	s.t.
40	36	Petra Stiasny	Switzerland	s.t.
41	16	Debora Silvestri	Italy	s.t.
42	38	Léa Curinier	France	+7:14
43	61	Nika Bobnar	Slovenia	+8:04
44	68	Marie Schreiber	Luxembourg	s.t.
45	76	Varvara Fasoi	Greece	s.t.
46	81	Raquel Queirós	Portugal	s.t.
47	56	Leila Gschwenter	Austria	s.t.
48	53	Marthe Truyen	Belgium	s.t.
49	19	Marta Lach	Poland	s.t.
50	63	Tjaša Sušnik	Slovenia	s.t.
51	62	Špela Kern	Slovenia	s.t.
52	40	Célia Le Mouel	France	s.t.
53	86	Alena Amialiusik	Belarus	s.t.
54	23	Agnieszka Skalniak-Sójka	Poland	s.t.
55	49	Linda Riedmann	Germany	s.t.
56	17	Marta Jaskulska	Poland	s.t.
57	21	Karolina Perekitko	Poland	s.t.
58	9	Francesca Barale	Italy	+8:09
59	15	Silvia Persico	Italy	s.t.
60	41	Marie Le Net	France	s.t.
61	13	Gaia Masetti	Italy	+8:11
62	74	Blanka Vas	Hungary	+8:13
63	14	Soraya Paladin	Italy	s.t.
64	88	Myral Greco	Albania	+11:07
65	10	Letizia Borghesi	Italy	s.t.
66	82	Beatriz Roxo	Portugal	s.t.
67	80	Antri Christoforou	Cyprus	s.t.
68	28	Sara Martín	Spain	+11:14
69	2	Amber Kraak	Netherlands	s.t.
70	27	Alicia González Blanco	Spain	s.t.
71	71	Valeriia Kononenko	Ukraine	+12:36
72	73	Kristýna Burlová	Czechia	+13:08
73	69	Maryna Altukhova	Ukraine	+13:25
74	18	Natalia Krześlak	Poland	+14:19
75	65	Christina Bragh Lorenzen	Denmark	s.t.
OTL	78	Akvilė Gedraitytė	Lithuania	+15:05
DNF	8	Lorena Wiebes	Netherlands	
DNF	24	Dominika Włodarczyk	Poland	
DNF	26	Mavi García	Spain	
DNF	45	Ricarda Bauernfeind	Germany	
DNF	59	Christina Schweinberger	Austria	
DNF	75	Petra Zsankó	Hungary	
DNF	77	Eleftheria Giachou	Greece	
DNF	83	Bríet Kristý Gunnarsdóttir	Iceland	
DNF	85	Alina Abramenka	Belarus	
DNF	87	Elena Petrova	North Macedonia	
DNS	25	Paula Blasi	Spain	
DNS	84	Gergana Stoyanova	Bulgaria	
