= 2022 European Road Championships – Women's time trial =

Women's elite time trial
2022 European Road Championships
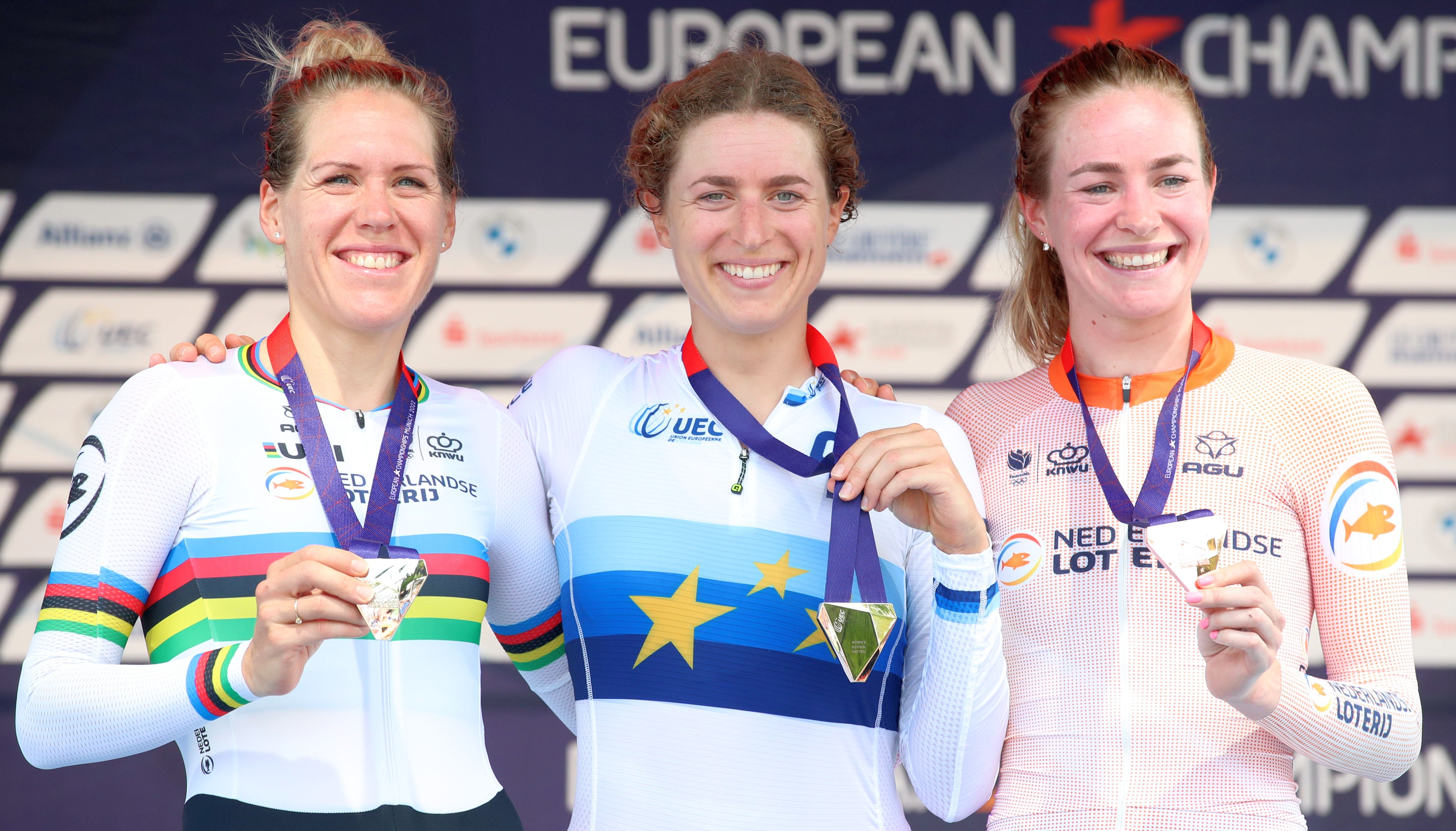

Race details
- Dates: 17 August 2022
- Stages: 1
- Distance: 24.0 km (14.91 mi)

Medalists
	Gold	Marlen Reusser (SUI)
	Silver	Ellen van Dijk (NED)
	Bronze	Riejanne Markus (NED)

The women's elite time trial at the 2022 European Road Championships took place on 17 August 2022, in Munich, Germany. Nations are allowed to enter a maximum of 2 riders into the event.

== Results ==
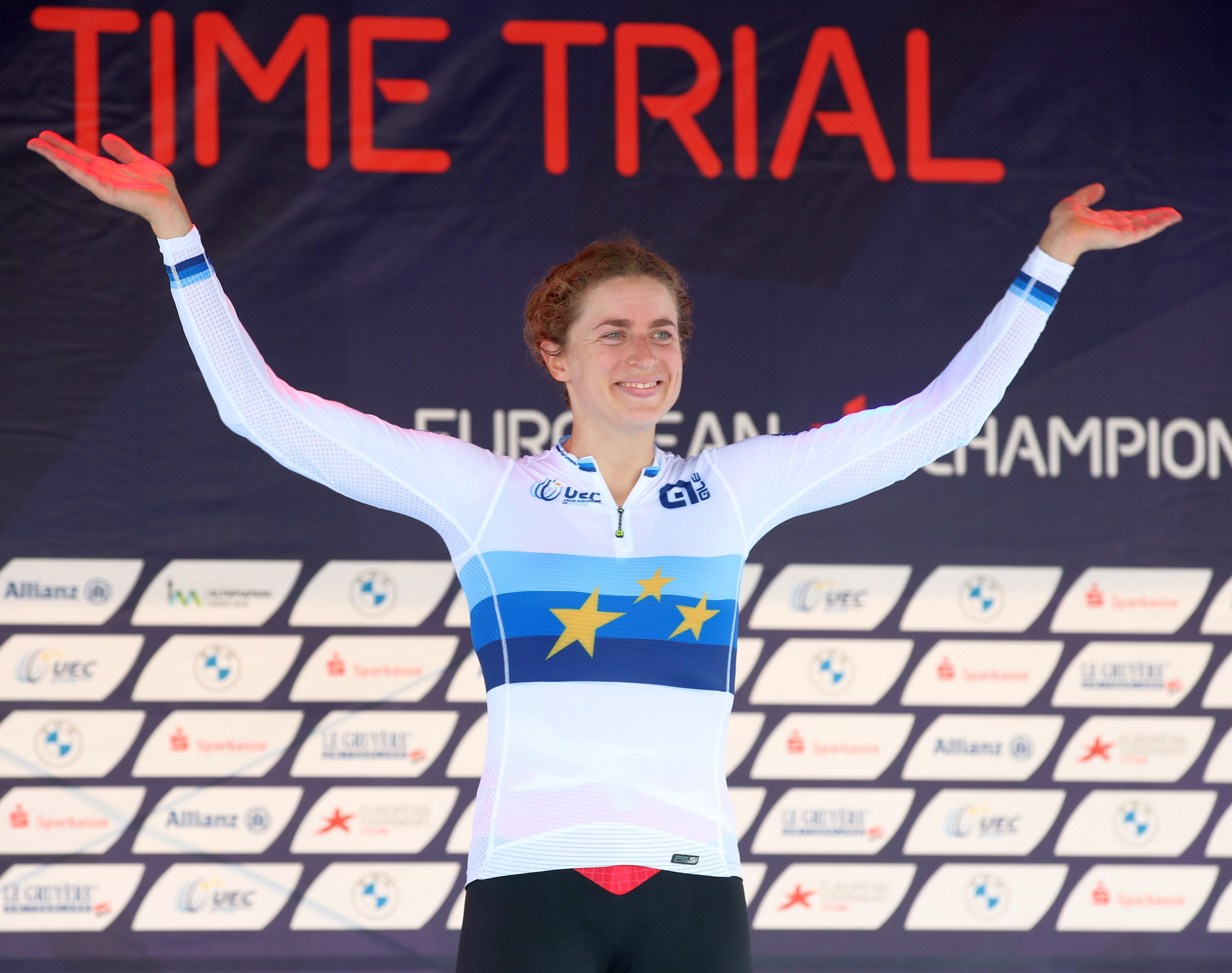
Marlen Reusser

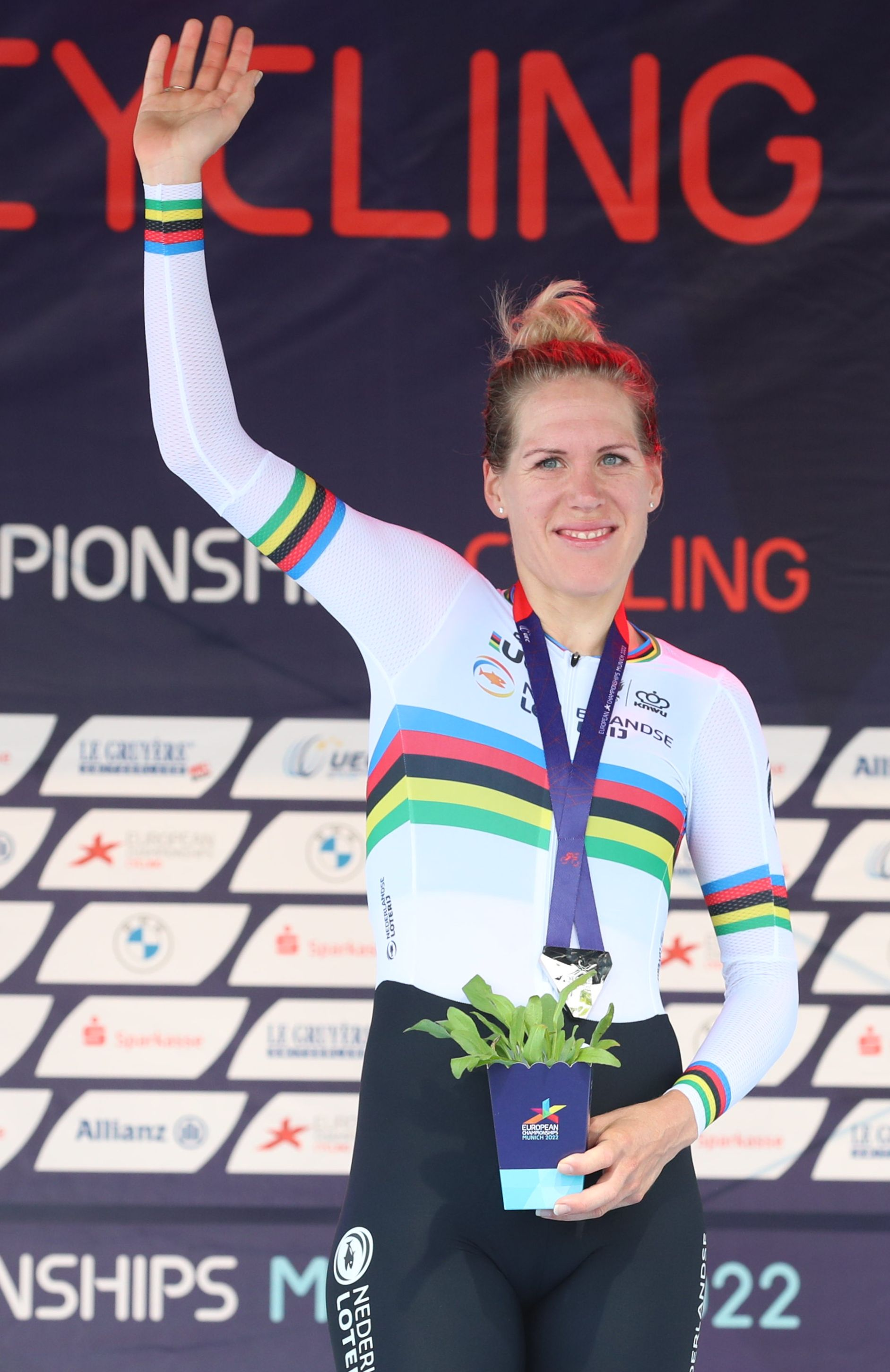
Ellen van Dijk

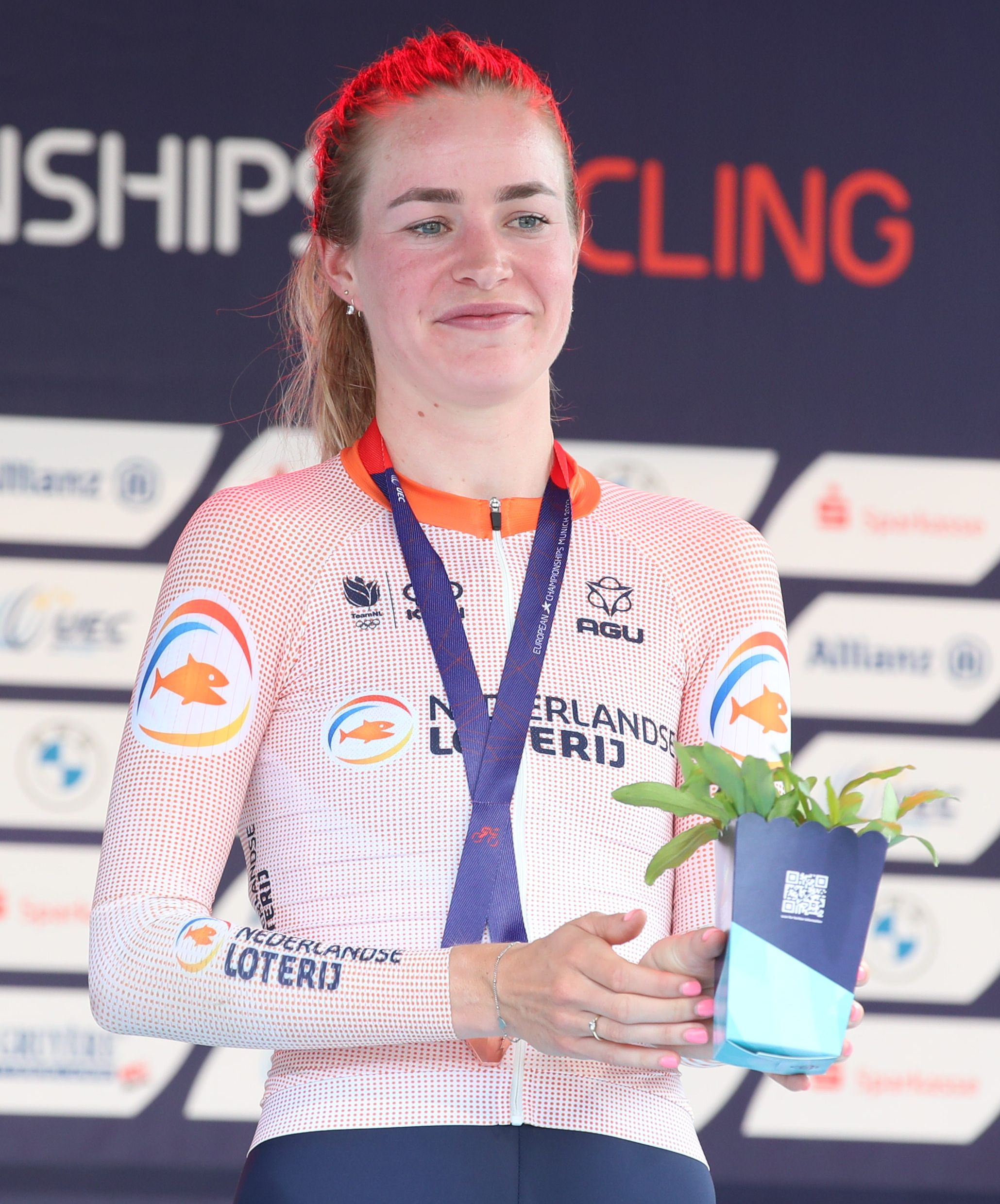
Riejanne Markus

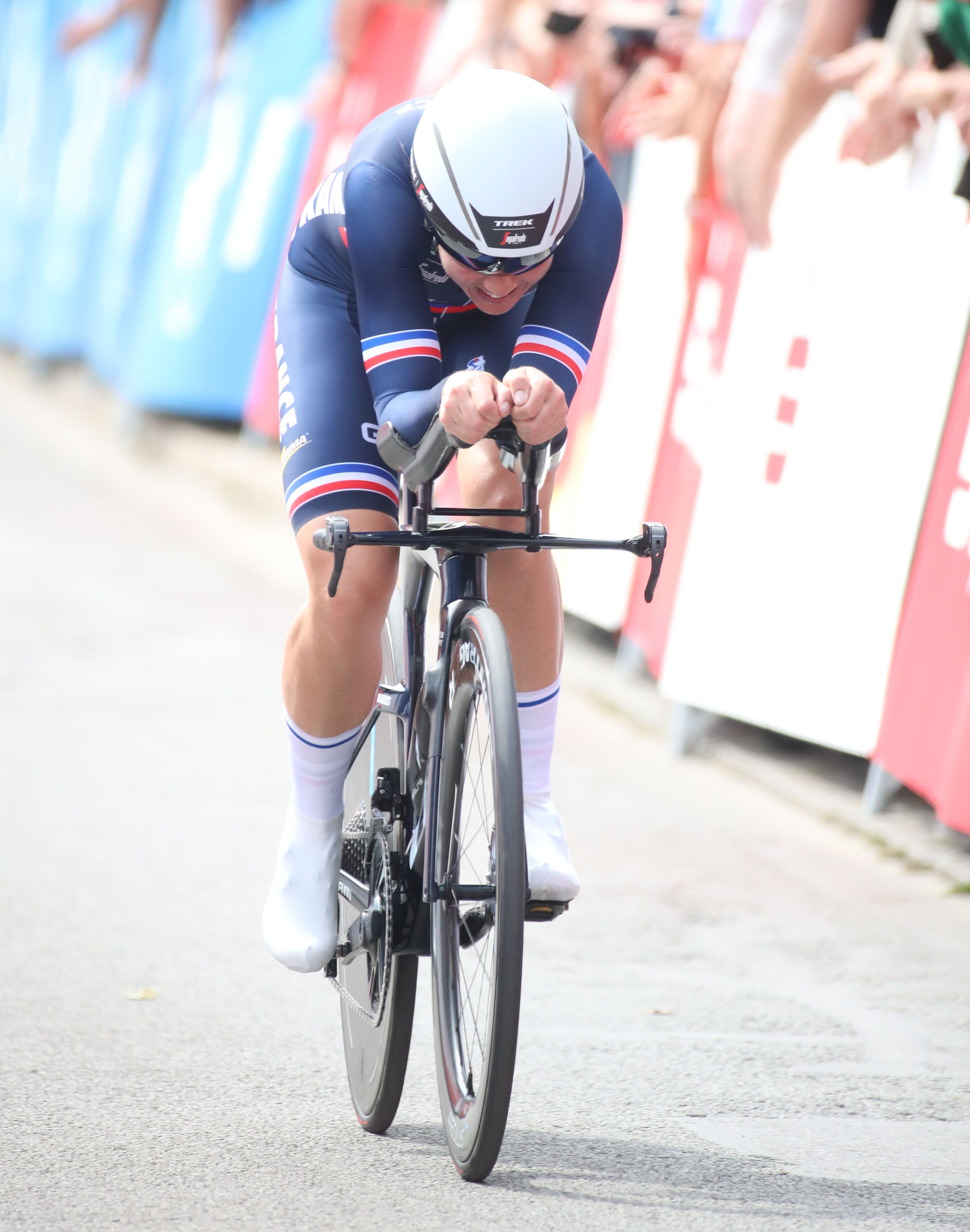
Audrey Cordon-Ragot

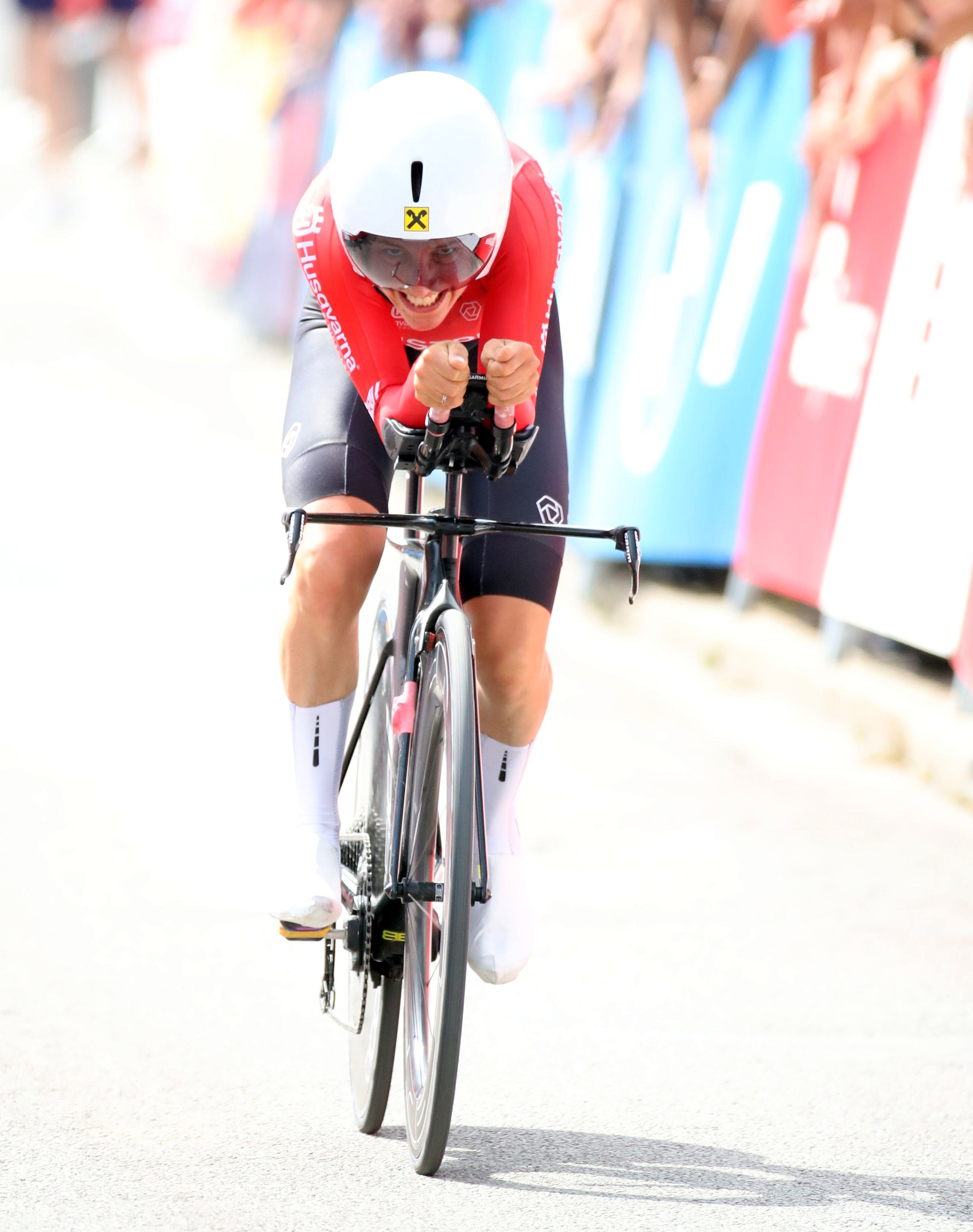
Anna Kiesenhofer

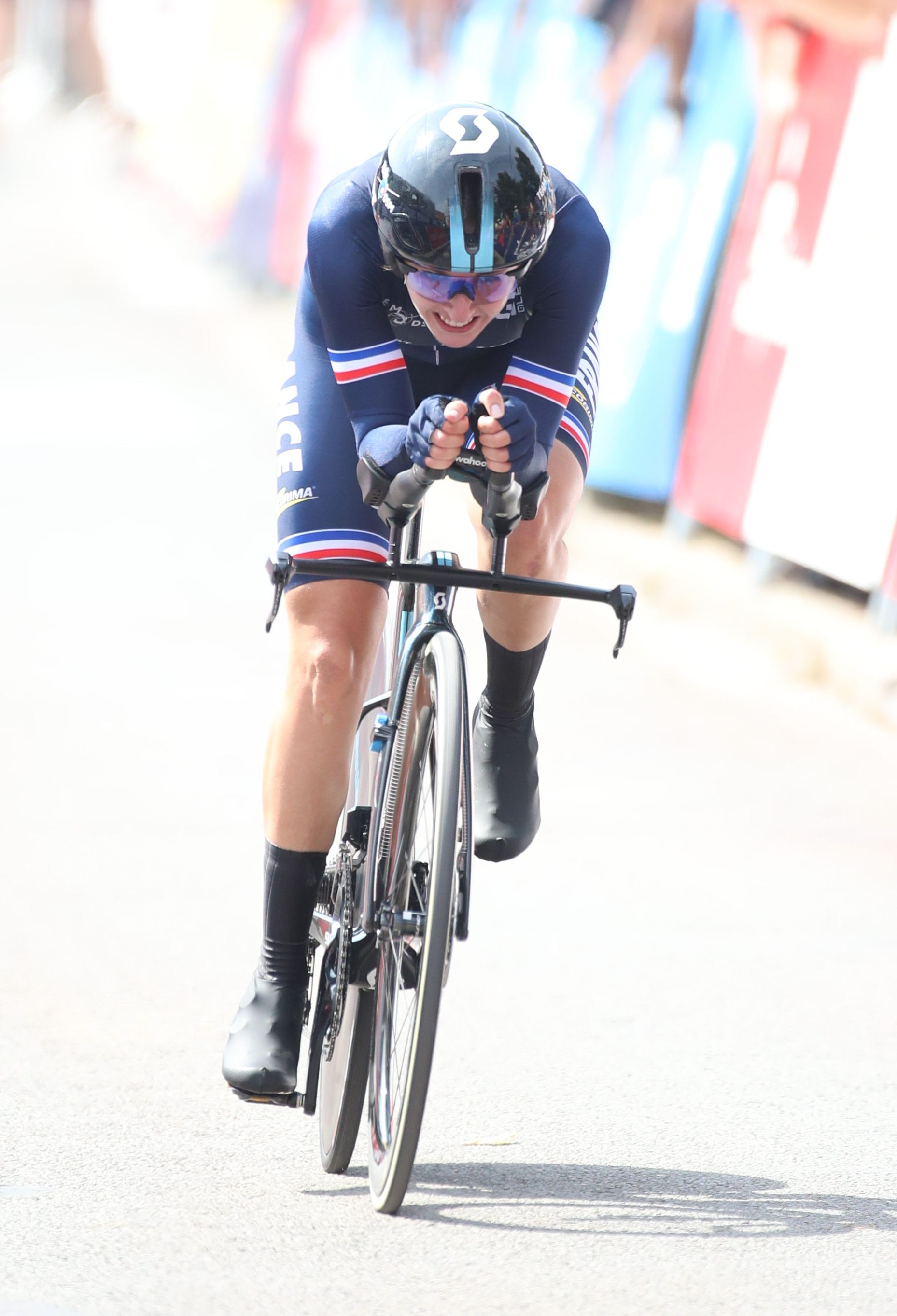
Juliette Labous

Rank	#	Cyclist	Nation	Time	Diff.
1st place, gold medalist(s)	2	Marlen Reusser	Switzerland	30:59.90	
2nd place, silver medalist(s)	1	Ellen van Dijk	Netherlands	31:05.67	+00:05.77
3rd place, bronze medalist(s)	19	Riejanne Markus	Netherlands	31:27.78	+00:27.88
4	5	Audrey Cordon-Ragot	France	31:53.31	+00:53.41
5	4	Anna Kiesenhofer	Austria	32:00.87	+01:00.97
6	21	Juliette Labous	France	32:01.10	+01:01.11
7	14	Julie van de Velde	Belgium	32:30.76	+01:30.86
8	20	Christina Schweinberger	Austria	32:32.76	+01:32.86
9	24	Elena Hartmann	Switzerland	32:37.85	+01:37.95
10	8	Agnieszka Skalniak-Sójka	Poland	32:50.71	+01:50.81
11	22	Emma Cecilie Bjerg	Denmark	32:55.34	+01:55.44
12	3	Lisa Brennauer	Germany	32:57.73	+01:57.83
13	6	Nathalie Eklund	Sweden	33:19.44	+02:19.54
14	23	Alessia Vigilia	Italy	33:23.32	+02:23.42
15	12	Kelly Murphy	Ireland	33:25.84	+02:25.94
16	16	Eugenia Bujak	Slovenia	33:30.81	+02:30.91
17	28	Jo Patterson	Ireland	33:32.56	+02:32.66
18	27	Rotem Gafinovitz	Israel	33:35.56	+02:35.66
19	15	Dana Rožlapa	Latvia	33:41.80	+02:41.18
20	9	Omer Shapira	Israel	33:44.34	+02:44.44
21	11	Arianna Fidanza	Italy	33:54.93	+02:55.03
22	10	Sandra Alonso	Spain	33:59.50	+02:59.15
23	18	Lisa Klein	Germany	34:35.26	+03:35.36
24	25	Ziortza Isasi	Spain	34:49.63	+03:49.73
25	26	Marta Lach	Poland	34:49.88	+03:49.98
26	13	Hafdís Sigurðardóttir	Iceland	34:58.81	+03:58.91
27	17	Inga Cešuliene	Slovenia	35:37.65	+04:37.75
28	29	Silja Rúnarsdóttir	Iceland	35:44.78	+04:44.88
29	7	Mia Sofie Rützou	Denmark	35:48.73	+04:48.83
