= 2023 Tour de Suisse Women =

2023 UCI Women's World Tour, race 19 of 27

Race details
- Dates: 17–20 June 2023
- Stages: 4
- Distance: 303.3 km (188.5 mi)
- Winning time: 10h 48' 51"

Results
| Jersey awarded to the overall winner | Winner | Marlen Reusser (SUI) | (SD Worx) |
| | Second | Demi Vollering (NED) | (SD Worx) |
| | Third | Elisa Longo Borghini (ITA) | (Trek–Segafredo) |
| Jersey awarded to the points classification winner | Points | Marlen Reusser (ITA) | (SD Worx) |
| Jersey awarded to the mountains classification winner | Mountains | Elise Chabbey (SUI) | (Canyon//SRAM) |
| Jersey awarded to the youth classification winner | Youth | Niamh Fisher-Black (NZL) | (SD Worx) |
| | Team | SD Worx | |

The 2023 Tour de Suisse Women was a women's road cycling stage race that was held in Switzerland from 17 to 20 June 2023. It was the seventh edition of the Tour de Suisse and was the nineteenth event on the 2023 UCI Women's World Tour calendar, joining the World Tour for the first time. The race was held following the men's Tour de Suisse.

It was won by Swiss rider Marlen Reusser of SD Worx, in her third win of the season. SD Worx dominated the event, winning 4 out of 5 classifications.

== Teams ==
10 of 14 UCI Women's WorldTeams and 8 UCI Women's Continental Teams made up the eighteen teams that participated in the race.

UCI Women's WorldTeams

- UAE Team ADQ
- Canyon//SRAM
- Liv Racing TeqFind
- Fenix–Deceuninck
- Movistar Team
- Israel Premier Tech Roland
- SD Worx
- Team Jayco–AlUla
- Team DSM
- Trek–Segafredo

UCI Women's Continental Teams

- Arkéa Pro Cycling Team
- Born To Win-Zhiraf-G20
- Cofidis
- Maxx-Solar Rose
- Stade Rochelais Charente-Maritime
- Team Coop–Hitec Products
- Team Grand Est-Komugi-La Fabrique
- WCC Team

== Route ==
The first stage was a circuit race in Weinfelden with 3 climbs, the second stage was an individual time trial from St. Gallen to Abtwil, the third stage was a hilly stage from St. Gallen to Ebnat-Kappel with 2 climbs and the final stage was a hilly stage from Ebnat-Kappel to Ebnat-Kappel with 4 climbs.

Stage characteristics and winners
| Stage | Date | Course | Distance | Type | Winner |
|---|---|---|---|---|---|
| 1 | 17 June | Weinfelden to Weinfelden | 56 km (35 mi) | Hilly stage | Blanka Vas (HUN) |
| 2 | 18 June | St. Gallen to Abtwil | 25.7 km (16.0 mi) | Individual time trial | Marlen Reusser (SUI) |
| 3 | 19 June | St. Gallen to Ebnat-Kappel | 120.8 km (75.1 mi) | Hilly stage | Eleonora Gasparrini (ITA) |
| 4 | 20 June | Ebnat-Kappel to Ebnat-Kappel | 100.8 km (62.6 mi) | Hilly stage | Niamh Fisher-Black (NZL) |
| Total | | 303.3 km (188.5 mi) | | | |

== Result ==
The race was dominated by SD Worx, who won three of the four stages. Both the overall and points classification were won by Swiss rider Marlen Reusser of SD Worx, who also won the stage 2 individual time trial. The youth classification won by stage 4 winner Niamh Fisher-Black of SD Worx. The mountains classification was won by Swiss rider Elise Chabbey of Canyon–SRAM. Vollering retained her lead in the UCI Women's World Tour standings.

Final general classification
| Rank | Rider | Team | Time |
|---|---|---|---|
| 1 | Marlen Reusser (SUI) | SD Worx | 7h 53' 22" |
| 2 | Demi Vollering (NED) | SD Worx | +1' 02" |
| 3 | Elisa Longo Borghini (ITA) | Trek–Segafredo | +1' 17" |
| 4 | Katarzyna Niewiadoma (POL) | Canyon//SRAM | +1' 24" |
| 5 | Elise Chabbey (SUI) | Canyon//SRAM | +3' 35" |
| 6 | Claire Steels (GBR) | Israel Premier Tech Roland | +3' 38" |
| 7 | Urška Žigart (SLO) | Team Jayco–AlUla | +4' 21" |
| 8 | Niamh Fisher-Black (NZL) | SD Worx | +4' 57" |
| 9 | Amber Kraak (NED) | Team Jumbo–Visma | +5' 03" |
| 10 | Eglantine Rayer (FRA) | Team DSM | +5' 12" |

== See also ==
- 2023 in women's road cycling
