= Entre Brenne et Montmorillonnais =

Race details
- Date: May
- Region: Nouvelle-Aquitaine
- Discipline: Road race
- Competition: UCI Europe Tour
- Type: Single day race

History
- First edition: 2011
- Editions: 8 (as of 2019)
- First winner: Pierre Drancourt (FRA)
- Most recent: Alberto Dainese (ITA)

The Entre Brenne et Montmorillonnais is a professional one day cycling race held annually in France. It is part of UCI Europe Tour in category 1.2.

== Winners ==
Year	Winner	Second	Third
Tour du Canton de Saint-Savin
2011	(France) Pierre Drancourt	(France) Blaise Sonnery	(France) Maxime Pinel
2012	(France) Jérémy Fabio	(France) Anthony Thomas	(France) Steven Garcin
À travers le Pays Montmorillonnais
2013	(France) Yannick Martinez	(France) Pierre Moncorgé	(France) Steven Tronet
2014	(Estonia) Alo Jakin	(France) Yoann Barbas	(France) Pierre Lebreton
2015	(France) Jérémy Cabot	(France) Flavien Maurelet	(Italy) Nicola Toffali
Entre Brenne et Montmorillonnais
2016	(Estonia) Silver Mäoma	(France) Damien Touzé	(France) Gwénnaël Tallonneau
2017	No race		
2018	(France) Geoffrey Bouchard	(France) Adrien Guillonnet	(France) Taruia Krainer
2019	(Italy) Alberto Dainese	(Slovenia) Žiga Jerman	(United Kingdom) Matthew Walls
