= Taruia Krainer =

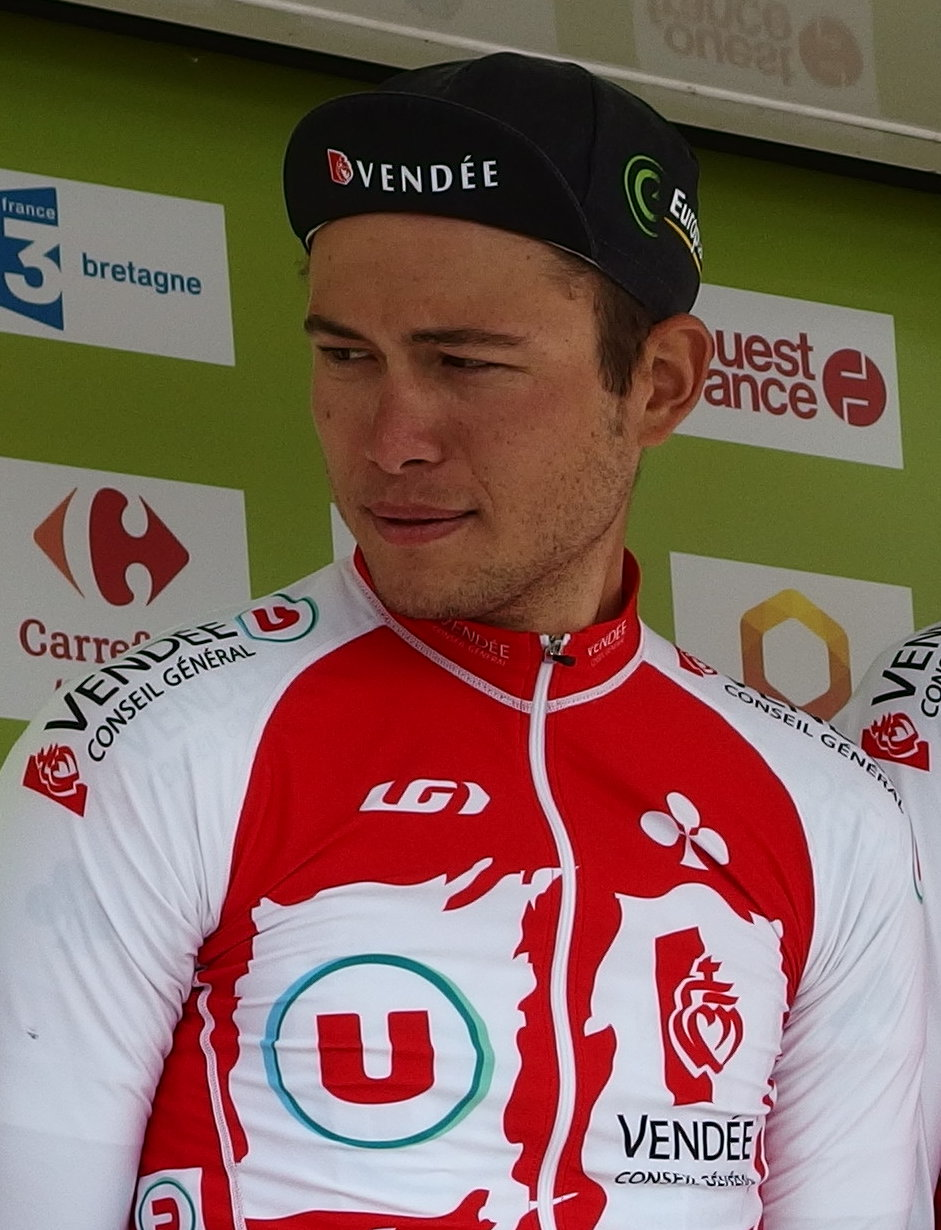
- Taruia Krainer in 2014

Personal information
- Full name: Taruia Franz Krainer
- Born: 1 June 1991 (age 35) Arue, French Polynesia, French Polynesia

Cycling career
- Sport: Cycling
- Current team: UC Cholet 49
- Discipline: Road
- Role: Rider; Directeur sportif

Amateur teams
- 2009–2011: UC Briochine
- 2012–2017: Vendée U
- 2018: VC Rouen 76
- 2019–2020: UC Cholet 49

Professional teams
- 2014: Team Europcar (stagiaire)
- 2015: Team Europcar (stagiaire)

Managerial team
- 2020–: UC Cholet 49

Taruia Franz Krainer (born 1 June 1991) is a French Polynesian road cyclist. He is currently the sports director of team UC Cholet 49.

Krainer was born in Arue, French Polynesia, and was educated at la Mennais high school. He moved to France at the age of 16 to pursue a career in cycling and to study.

He raced with UC Briochine from 2009 to 2011, then joined the Vendée U team in 2012. In 2014 and 2015 he was a stagiaire (intern) with Team Europcar. In 2017 he won the Prix Marcel Bergereau. In 2018 he placed third in the Entre Brenne et Montmorillonnais. He also won the 2018 Tour Tahiti Nui. In June 2020 he was appointed sports director of UC Cholet. In 2022, he competed in the mixed team relay with the French Polynesian team at the 2022 UCI Road World Championships.

== Major results ==
2012
1st Paris–Tours Espoirs
2013
4th Road race, National Under-23 Road Championships
2014
6th Overall Paris–Arras Tour
2015
1st Tour de Nouvelle-Calédonie

1st Stages 4 & 8

8th Overall Le Triptyque des Monts et Châteaux
2016
1st Stages 3, 5a & 9 Tour de Nouvelle-Calédonie
2017
1st Prix Marcel Bergereau
1st Circuit des Deux Provinces
7th Overall Tour de Gironde
2018
1st Overall Trois Jours de Cherbourg
1st Overall Tour Tahiti Nui

1st Staes 2, 4 & 5b

3rd Entre Brenne et Montmorillonnais
4th Grand Prix de la Ville de Nogent-sur-Oise
2019
1st Stage 6 Tour Tahiti Nui
