= 2025 UCI Road World Championships – Women's time trial =

Cycling event

Women's time trial
2025 UCI Road World Championships

Race details
- Dates: 21 September 2025
- Distance: 31.2 km (19.4 mi)
- Winning time: 43' 09"

Medalists
	Gold	(Switzerland) Marlen Reusser (SUI)
	Silver	(Netherlands) Anna van der Breggen (NED)
	Bronze	(Netherlands) Demi Vollering (NED)

The Women's time trial of the 2025 UCI Road World Championships was a cycling event that took place on 21 September 2025 in Kigali, Rwanda. It was the 32nd edition of the championship, for which Grace Brown of Australia was the defending champion, having won in 2024.

== Final classification ==
Rank	Position in the time trial
Time	Time taken to complete the time trial
Diff	Deficit to the winner of the time trial
DNS	Denotes a rider who did not start
DNF	Denotes a rider who did not finish
DSQ	Denotes a rider who was disqualified from the race
OTL	Denotes a rider who finished outside the time limit

Rank	Rider	Country	Time
1st place, gold medalist(s)	Marlen Reusser	Switzerland	43' 09"
2nd place, silver medalist(s)	Anna van der Breggen	Netherlands	+ 51"
3rd place, bronze medalist(s)	Demi Vollering	Netherlands	+ 1' 04"
4	Brodie Chapman	Australia	+ 1' 20"
5	Katrine Aalerud	Norway	+ 1' 24"
6	Antonia Niedermaier	Germany	+ 1' 29"
7	Juliette Labous	France	+ 1' 32"
8	Anna Henderson	United Kingdom	+ 1' 37"
9	Chloé Dygert	United States	+ 2' 25"
10	Mireia Benito	Spain	+ 2' 32"
11	Monica Trinca Colonel	Italy	+ 3' 02"
12	Sigrid Ytterhus Haugset	Norway	+ 3' 15"
13	Cedrine Kerbaol	France	+ 3' 20"
14	Katarzyna Niewiadoma	Poland	+ 3' 22"
15	Yuliia Biriukova	Ukraine	+ 3' 23"
16	Urška Žigart	Slovenia	+ 3' 30"
17	Anna Kiesenhofer	Austria	+ 3' 49"
18	Zhang Hao	China	+ 4' 14"
19	Ruth Edwards	United States	+ 4' 21"
20	Olivia Baril	Canada	+ 4' 34"
21	Marthe Goossens	Belgium	+ 4' 43"
22	Leung Wing Yee	Hong Kong	+ 5' 06"
23	Teniel Campbell	Trinidad and Tobago	+ 5' 15"
24	Diana Peñuela	Colombia	+ 5' 21"
25	Nora Jenčušová	Slovakia	+ 5' 22"
26	Soraya Paladin	Italy	+ 3' 41"
27	Xaveline Nirere	Rwanda	+ 3' 43"
28	Natalia Frolova	Individual Neutral Athletes	+ 3' 43"
29	Lucie de Marigny-Lagesse	Mauritius	+ 8' 05"
30	Faina Potapova	Kazakhstan	+ 8' 18"
31	Yulduz Hashimi	Afghanistan	+ 8' 42"
32	Brhan Abrha	Ethiopia	+ 8' 46"
33	Serkalem Watango	Ethiopia	+ 8' 54"
34	Aurelie Halbwachs	Mauritius	+ 9' 18"
35	Diane Ingabire	Rwanda	+ 9' 48"
36	Akpeiil Ossim	Kazakhstan	+ 9' 50"
37	Kendra Tabu	Kenya	+ 11' 03"
38	Monica Kiplagat	Kenya	+ 14' 46"
39	Hermionne Ahouissou	Benin	+ 15' 12"
40	Jamila Abdullah	Tanzania	+ 15' 14"
41	Lobopo Kono	Botswana	+ 17' 19"
42	Namukasa Trinitah	Uganda	+ 19' 16"
43	Lolwa Al-Marri	Qatar	+ 25' 01"
44	Kholoud Al-Kuwari	Qatar	+ 41' 06"
