= Marlen Reusser =

Swiss cyclist

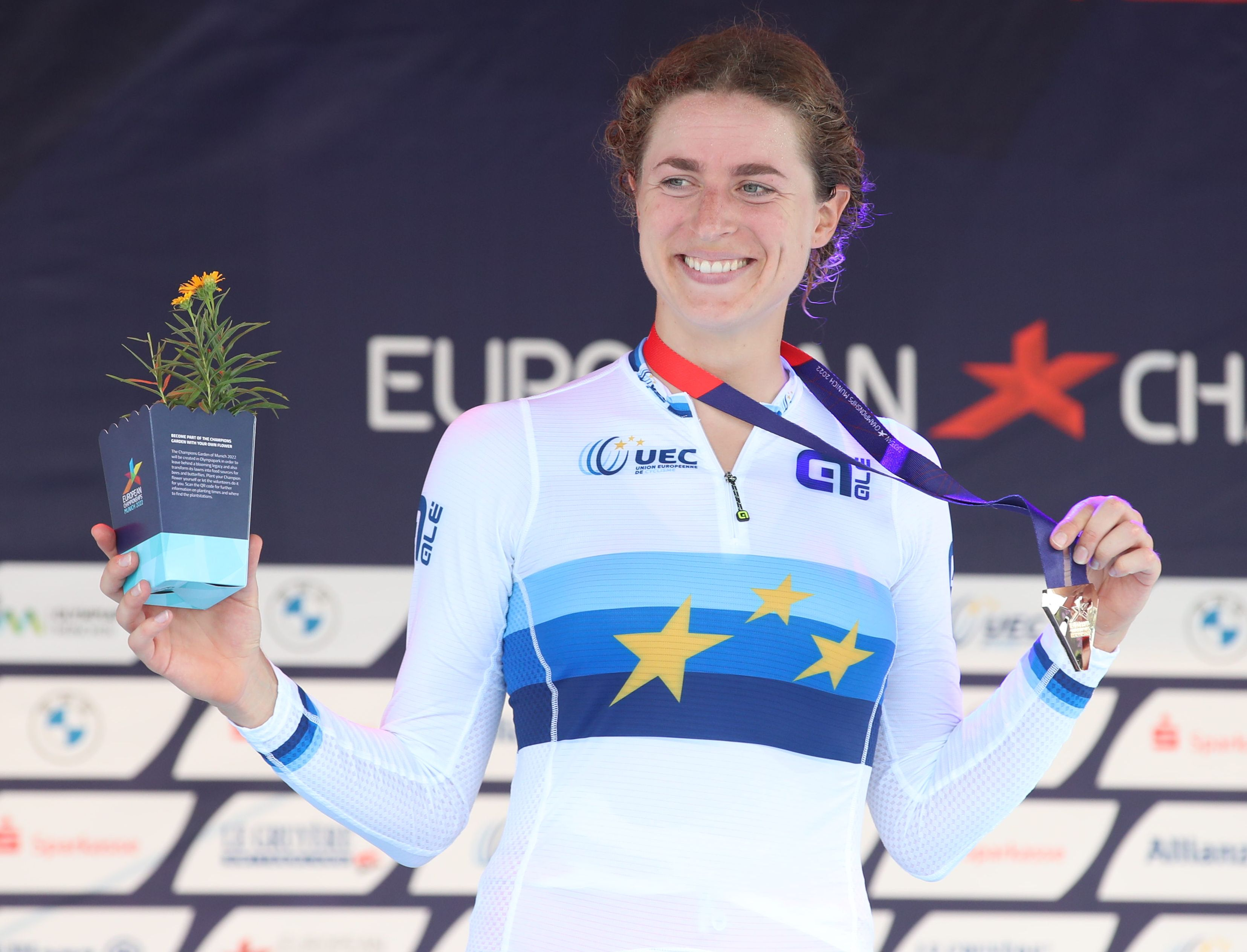
- Reusser at the 2022 European Championships

Personal information
- Full name: Marlen Reusser
- Nickname: The Flying Elephant
- Born: 20 September 1991 (age 35) Jegenstorf, Switzerland
- Height: 180 cm (5 ft 11 in)
- Weight: 70 kg (154 lb)

Cycling career
- Sport: Cycling
- Current team: Movistar Team
- Discipline: Road
- Role: Rider

Professional teams
- 2019: WCC Team
- 2020: Bigla–Katusha
- 2021: Alé BTC Ljubljana
- 2022–2024: SD Worx
- 2025-: Movistar Team

Major wins
- Major Tours Tour de France 3 individual stages (2022, 2023, 2026) Giro d'Italia 1 individual stage (2025) Stage races Tour de Suisse (2023, 2025, 2026) Itzulia Women (2023) Vuelta a Burgos (2025) One-day races and Classics World Time Trial Championships (2025, 2026) European Time Trial Championships (2021, 2022, 2023, 2025, 2026) National Road Race Championships (2019, 2021, 2023) National Time Trial Championships (2017, 2019, 2020, 2021, 2025) Gent–Wevelgem (2023) Dwars door Vlaanderen (2026)
Medal record
Women's road bicycle racing
Representing Switzerland
Olympic Games
Silver medal – second place	2020 Tokyo	Time trial
World Championships
Gold medal – first place	2022 Wollongong	Mixed team relay
Gold medal – first place	2023 Glasgow	Mixed team relay
Gold medal – first place	2025 Kigali	Time trial
Gold medal – first place	2026 Montreal	Time trial
Silver medal – second place	2020 Imola	Time trial
Silver medal – second place	2021 Brugge	Time trial
Bronze medal – third place	2022 Wollongong	Time trial
Bronze medal – third place	2025 Kigali	Mixed team relay
European Championships
Gold medal – first place	2021 Trentino	Time trial
Gold medal – first place	2022 Munich	Time trial
Gold medal – first place	2023 Drenthe	Time trial
Gold medal – first place	2025 Guilherand-Granges	Time trial
Gold medal – first place	2026 Ljubljana	Time trial
Silver medal – second place	2020 Plouay	Mixed team relay
Bronze medal – third place	2020 Plouay	Time trial
Bronze medal – third place	2025 Guilherand-Granges	Mixed team relay
Bronze medal – third place	2026 Ljubljana	Road race
European Games
Gold medal – first place	2019 Minsk	Time trial

Marlen Reusser (born 20 September 1991) is a Swiss racing cyclist, who currently rides for UCI Women's WorldTeam Movistar Team.

== Career ==
She took up competitive cycling whilst at university, riding in the cycling legs of mixed relay triathlons as an amateur. She entered the road events of the Swiss national cycling championships in 2017, a few months after receiving a racing licence and whilst in the final year of studies for a degree in medicine: she won the time trial and was runner up in the road race. Her success earned her selection for that year's European Road Championships. She also rode in the women's time trial event at the 2017 UCI Road World Championships. In 2019 Reusser took up a place at the World Cycling Centre in Aigle, deciding to ride full-time. During her year with the WCC she finished third at the BeNe Ladies Tour and sixth in the World Championship individual time trial.

The following year she took a top 10 finish at Liège–Bastogne–Liège. She also rode in the individual time trial at the 2020 UCI Road World Championships in Imola, where she won the silver medal.

For the 2021 season, Reusser joined the Alé BTC Ljubljana team, following the collapse of Équipe Paule Ka. She rode in the individual time trial at the 2021 UCI Road World Championships in Brugge, where she won the bronze medal.

After one season there, she joined SD Worx in 2022. She won stage 4 of the 2022 Tour de France Femmes in a solo breakaway. She was also named most combative rider for the day. She rode in the individual time trial at the 2022 UCI Road World Championships in Wollongong, where she won the bronze medal - as well as the mixed team relay where she won the gold medal.

In 2023, Reusser won Gent–Wevelgem, as well as the Itzulia Women and Tour de Suisse Women stage races. At the Tour de France Femmes, she won the stage 8 time trial in Pau.

In September, 2025, Reusser won her first UCI Women 's Elite Individual Trial (ITT ) title at the 2025 UCI Road World Championships in Kigali.

In September 2026, she won this title again at the 2026 UCI Road World Championships in Montreal.

== Personal life ==
Marlen Reusser grew up in a farming family in the Swiss Emmental. Until 16 she played violin, and participated at an arts support program at the University of the Arts Bern. In school she started running, after a couple of ankle injuries she switched to swimming and cycling. From 2008 to 2009 she was president of the Bernese Young Greens. After matura she studied medicine and worked as assistant doctor for surgery. From 2017 to 2018 she was in the board of the Emmental Green Party. While preparing for the 2018 World Championship in Innsbruck, she concurrently worked part time as a doctor in the Langnau hospital.

== Major results ==
2017
National Road Championships

1st Time trial
2nd Road race

2018
4th Chrono Champenois – Trophée Européen
5th Time trial, National Road Championships
10th Chrono des Nations
2019
1st Time trial, European Games
National Road Championships

1st Time trial
1st Road race

1st Ljubljana–Domžale–Ljubljana TT
3rd BeNe Ladies Tour
3rd Chrono Champenois – Trophée Européen
4th SwissEver GP Cham–Hagendorn
5th Overall The Princess Maha Chackri Sirindhorn's Cup
6th UCI Road World Championships – Women's time trial
2020
1st Time trial, National Road Championships
2nd UCI Road World Championships – Women's time trial
UEC European Road Championships

2nd Team relay
3rd Time trial

5th Overall Setmana Ciclista Valenciana
7th Liège–Bastogne–Liège
10th UCI Road World Championships – Women's road race
2021
UEC European Road Championships

1st Time trial
7th Road race

National Road Championships

1st Time trial
1st Road race

1st Chrono des Nations
2nd Overall Challenge by La Vuelta

1st Stage 1

2nd Overall Holland Ladies Tour

1st Stage 2 (ITT)

2nd Time trial, Olympic Games
2nd UCI Road World Championships – Women's time trial
3rd Overall Tour de Suisse
4th Overall Tour of Norway
9th Tour of Flanders
2022
1st UCI Road World Championships – Mixed team relay
1st Time trial, UEC European Road Championships
1st Stage 4 Tour de France
3rd UCI Road World Championships – Women's time trial
3rd Overall Bloeizone Fryslân Tour
4th Brabantse Pijl
5th Tour of Flanders
2023
1st Time trial, UEC European Road Championships
1st Overall Tour de Suisse

1st Stage 2 (ITT)

1st Overall Itzulia Women
1st Gent–Wevelgem
1st Stage 8 (ITT) Tour de France
3rd Liège–Bastogne–Liège
5th Vuelta a Burgos
6th Brabantse Pijl
7th Dwars door Vlaanderen
7th Tour of Flanders
2024
1st Overall Vuelta a la Comunitat Valenciana

1st Stage 2

9th Overall Itzulia Women
2025
1st UCI Road World Championships – Women's time trial
1st Time trial, UEC European Road Championships
1st Overall Tour de Suisse

1st Points classification
1st Stages 1 & 4

1st Overall Vuelta a Burgos

1st Points classification
1st Mountains classification
1st Stages 3 & 4

1st Trofeo Palma
Giro d'Italia

1st Stage 1 (ITT)
Held after Stage 1

2nd Overall La Vuelta Femenina
2nd Overall Setmana Ciclista Valenciana
2nd Trofeo Tessile & Moda Donne
6th Liège–Bastogne–Liège
9th UCI Road World Championships – Women's road race
10th Tour of Flanders
2026
1st UCI Road World Championships – Women's time trial
UEC European Road Championships

1st Time trial
3rd Road race

1st Overall Tour de Suisse

1st Points classification
1st Stages 4 & 5

1st Dwars door Vlaanderen
Tour de France

1st Stage 4 (ITT)
Held after Stages 4–6

3rd UCI Road World Championships – Mixed team relay
4th UCI Road World Championships – Women's road race
