= Urška Žigart =

Slovenian cyclist

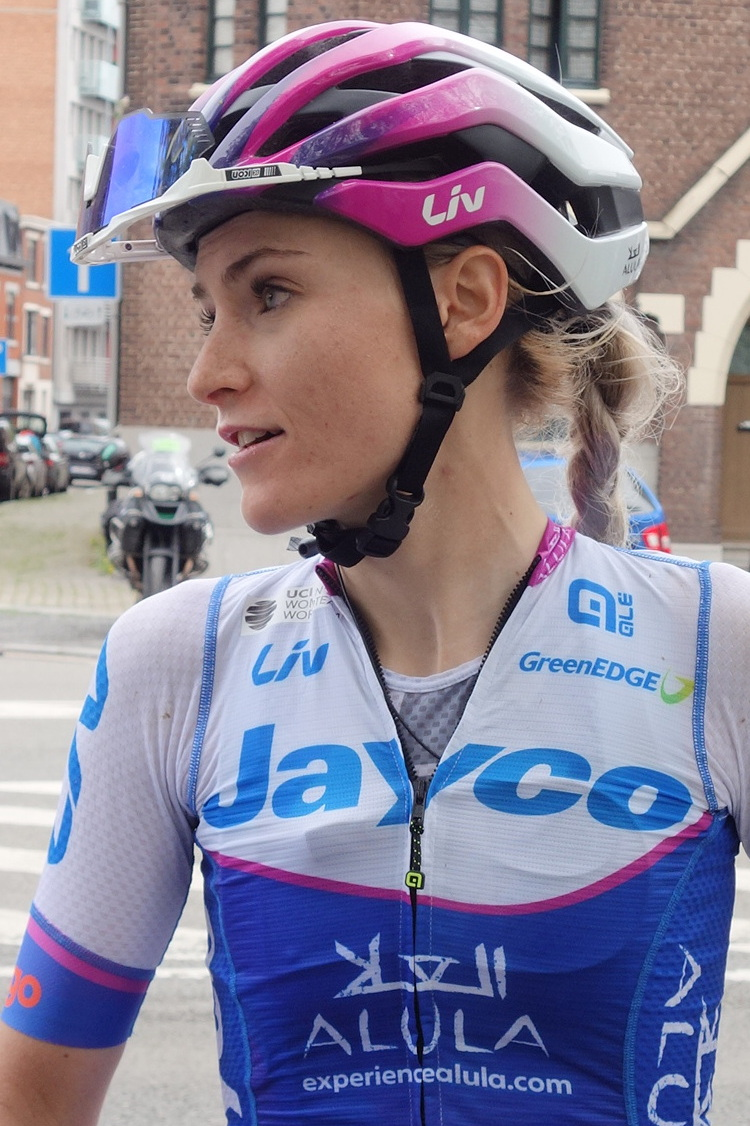
- Žigart in 2023

Personal information
- Full name: Urška Žigart
- Born: 4 December 1996 (age 29) Slovenska Bistrica, Slovenia
- Height: 1.64 m (5 ft 5 in)
- Weight: 50 kg (110 lb)

Cycling career
- Sport: Cycling
- Current team: AG Insurance–Soudal
- Discipline: Road
- Role: Rider

Professional teams
- 2015–2019: BTC City Ljubljana
- 2020: Alé BTC Ljubljana
- 2021–2024: Team BikeExchange
- 2025–: AG Insurance–Soudal

Major wins
- One-day races and Classics National Road Race Championships (2024) National Time Trial Championships (2020, 2022, 2023, 2024)

Urška Žigart (Slovene pronunciation: [ˈùːɾʃka ˈʒìːgaɾt]) (born 4 December 1996) is a Slovenian professional racing cyclist who currently rides for UCI Women's WorldTeam AG Insurance–Soudal. Žigart has won the Slovenian National Time Trial Championships four times (2020, 2022–2024), and won the Slovenian National Road Race Championships in 2024.

== Career ==
In 2020, she won the Slovenian National Time Trial Championships and competed in the Tour de l'Ardeche and Giro Rosa. She finished third in the Slovenian National Road Race Championships behind her teammate Urša Pintar and Špela Kern of the Lviv Cycling Team.

In November 2020, Žigart signed a contract for the 2021 season with the Mitchelton–Scott team, later renamed Team BikeExchange. In 2022, Žigart won the Slovenian national time trial championship for the second time – repeating this in 2023 and 2024. In 2024, Žigart also won the Slovenian national road race championship.

From 2025, Žigart has been a rider on Team AG Insurance–Soudal.

In June 2026, Žigart crashed in the final kilometers of stage 2 of the Tour de Swiss women, suffering a broken jaw.

== Personal life ==
Žigart's partner is cyclist Tadej Pogačar, a five-time Tour de France winner. They were engaged in September 2021. After Pogačar withdrew from the Slovenia team for the Paris Olympics due to "extreme fatigue"(after winning the Tour just a week prior to the Paris Olympics), he said his decision was also swayed by the Slovenian Olympic Committee, which had not selected Žigart, who had won the Slovenian road race and time trial championships that year, to compete at the Games.

== Major results ==
2016
3rd Time trial, National Road Championships
2018
National Road Championships

4th Time trial
5th Road race

7th Road race, Mediterranean Games
2019
National Road Championships

3rd Road race
3rd Time trial

7th Overall Vuelta a Burgos
2020
National Road Championships

1st Time trial
3rd Road race

10th Overall Tour de Feminin
2021
1st Stage 4 Setmana Ciclista Valenciana
National Road Championships

3rd Time trial
4th Road race

7th Overall Tour de Feminin
2022
National Road Championships

1st Time trial
5th Road race

8th Emakumeen Nafarroako
2023
National Road Championships

1st Time trial
2nd Road race

7th Overall Tour de Suisse
9th Durango-Durango Emakumeen Saria
10th Giro dell'Emilia
2024
National Road Championships

1st Road race
1st Time trial

3rd Overall Gracia–Orlová
4th Giro dell'Emilia
9th Overall Tour de Suisse
2025
National Road Championships

2nd Time trial
5th Road race

2nd Tour de Romandie
3rd Trofeo Tessile & Moda Donne
5th Overall Tour de Suisse
9th Overall Giro d'Italia
2026
6th Overall La Vuelta Femenina
8th Overall Giro d'Italia

=== General classification results ===
Major Tour results timeline
Major Tours	2015	2016	2017	2018	2019	2020	2021	2022	2023	2024	2025	2026
La Vuelta Femenina	Race did not exist								40	—	—	6
Giro Rosa	—	—	—	63	50	78	—	—	DNF	12	9	8
Tour de France Femmes	Race did not exist							29	—	—	—	48
Stage race results timeline
Stage race	2015	2016	2017	2018	2019	2020	2021	2022	2023	2024	2025	2026
Emakumeen Bira	—	—	—	60	44	Race no longer exists						
Ladies Tour of Norway	—	—	—	—	—	NH	44	No longer exists				
Lotto Belgium Tour	—	—	—	—	—	NH	73	—	Not held		—	—
UAE Tour	Race did not exist								DNF	—	73	—
Grand Prix Elsy Jacobs	—	—	—	—	—	NH	—	—	—	—	—	—
Itzulia Women	Race did not exist							19	—	28	16	—
Vuelta a Burgos	—	—	—	—	7	NH	—	49	63	—	—	—
Tour de Suisse	Race not held						—	30	7	9	5	—
Tour of Scandinavia	Race did not exist							—	38	NH	NH	—
Tour de Romandie	Race did not exist							37	32	41	2	—
Holland Ladies Tour	—	—	—	66	—	NH	—	—	—	—	—	—

=== Classics results timeline ===
Monument	2015	2016	2017	2018	2019	2020	2021	2022	2023	2024	2025
Tour of Flanders	—	—	—	—	—	—	—	—	—	—	—
Paris–Roubaix	Race did not exist					NH	—	—	—	—	—
Milan-San Remo	Race did not exist										49
Liège–Bastogne–Liège	Race did not exist		—	—	87	—	—	—	64	32	38
Classic	2015	2016	2017	2018	2019	2020	2021	2022	2023	2024	2025
Clásica de San Sebastián	Race did not exist				34	NH	36	No longer exists			
Open de Suède Vårgårda	—	—	—	—	—	Not held		60	No longer exists		
Omloop Het Nieuwsblad	—	—	—	—	83	84	—	—	—	—	—
Strade Bianche	—	—	—	OTL	DNF	—	—	DNF	—	—	51
Trofeo Alfredo Binda	—	—	—	—	DNF	NH	DNF	50	69	40	—
Dwars door Vlaanderen	Race did not exist		—	—	—	NH	104	—	—	—	—
Scheldeprijs	Race did not exist						DNF	—	—	—	—
Brabantse Pijl	N/A	—	—	62	DNF	—	—	DNF	—	—	69
Amstel Gold Race	Not held		—	79	—	NH	—	—	82	—	—
La Flèche Wallonne	—	—	—	55	DNF	—	—	59	43	40	—
GP de Plouay-Bretagne	DNF	—	—	64	—	DNF	—	DNF	—	29	
Giro dell'Emilia	—	—	28	17	42	73	—	12	10	4	
Grand Prix Féminin de Chambéry	—	—	—	—	—	—	—	—	—	—	14

=== Major championships results ===
Event		2015	2016	2017	2018	2019	2020	2021	2022	2023	2024	2025
World Championships	Road race	—	—	—	67	DNF	105	DNF	—	DNF	24	23
World Championships	Time trial	—	—	—	—	—	—	—	28	29	17	16
European Championships	Road race	N/A	—	—	—	—	DNF	23	76	—	—	
European Championships	Time trial	N/A	—	—	—	—	23	—	—	—	—	
National Championships	Road race	7	6	7	5	3	3	4	5	2	1	5
National Championships	Time trial	—	3	—	4	3	1	3	1	1	1	2

== See also ==
- List of 2015 UCI Women's Teams and riders
