= Trofeo Tessile & Moda Donne =

Women's cycling race in Italy

Race details
- Date: October
- Region: Italy
- Local name(s): Trofeo Tessile e Moda Donne (Italian)
- Discipline: Road
- Type: One-day race
- Organiser: Gruppo Sportivo Emilia
- Web site: www.gsemilia.it/corse/trofeo-tessile-e-moda/

History
- First edition: 2025
- Editions: 1 (as of 2025)
- First winner: Elisa Longo Borghini (ITA)
- Most wins: No repeat winners
- Most recent: Elisa Longo Borghini (ITA)

The Trofeo Tessile & Moda Donne is a one-day road cycling race held in the Province of Biella, Italy. It was first held in 2025 and is classified as a 1.1 race by the Union Cycliste Internationale.

The inaugural edition followed a 95.3 kilometres (59.2 mi) route from Valdengo to the Santuario di Oropa, featuring a decisive final 6.7 kilometres (4.2 mi) climb. Italian Elisa Longo Borghini won solo ahead of Marlen Reusser and Urška Žigart.

== Winners ==
Year	Country	Rider	Team
2025	Italy	Elisa Longo Borghini	UAE Team ADQ
