= 2026 European Road Championships – Women's time trial =

Women's elite time trial
2026 European Road Championships

Race details
- Dates: 7 October 2026
- Stages: 1
- Distance: 22 km (14 mi)
- Winning time: 31:30.84

Medalists
	Gold	Marlen Reusser (SUI)
	Silver	Demi Vollering (NED)
	Bronze	Juliette Berthet (FRA)

The women's elite time trial at the 2026 European Road Championships took place on 7 October 2026, in Ljubljana, Slovenia.

== Results ==
Rank	#	Cyclist	Nation	Time	Diff.
1st place, gold medalist(s)	1	Marlen Reusser	Switzerland	31:30.84	
2nd place, silver medalist(s)	2	Demi Vollering	Netherlands	31:54.17	+00:23.33
3rd place, bronze medalist(s)	9	Juliette Berthet	France	32:40.97	+01:10.13
4	4	Elisa Longo Borghini	Italy	32:47.51	+01:16.67
5	6	Dominika Włodarczyk	Poland	33:01.63	+01:30.79
6	5	Cédrine Kerbaol	France	33:30.79	+01:59.95
7	16	Sandrine Tas	Belgium	33:32.71	+02:01.87
8	15	Lauren Dickson	Great Britain	33:53.53	+02:22.69
9	7	Lotte Claes	Belgium	34:08.10	+02:37.26
10	8	Lieke Nooijen	Netherlands	34:10.84	+02:40.00
11	3	Franziska Koch	Germany	34:28.12	+02:57.28
12	13	Yuliia Biriukova	Ukraine	34:50.10	+03:19.26
13	17	Nina Berton	Luxembourg	35:07.43	+03:36.59
14	11	Alessia Vigilia	Italy	35:24.63	+03:53.79
15	12	Steffi Häberlin	Switzerland	35:27.62	+03:56.78
16	14	Marie Schreiber	Luxembourg	35:45.57	+04:14.73
17	10	Nika Bobnar	Slovenia	36:05.47	+04:34.63
18	25	Eleftheria Giachou	Greece	36:21.67	+04:50.83
19	23	Alina Abramenka	Belarus	38:05.64	+06:34.80
20	19	Gergana Stoyanova	Bulgaria	38:36.67	+07:05.83
21	18	Varvara Fasoi	Greece	38:40.31	+07:09.47
22	22	Bríet Kristý Gunnarsdóttir	Iceland	38:52.15	+07:21.31
23	20	Beatriz Roxo	Portugal	39:29.87	+07:59.03
24	24	Anja Perović	Montenegro	48:03.96	+16:33.12
	21	Valeriia Kononenko	Ukraine	DNS	
