= 2026 Dwars door Vlaanderen for Women =

Cycling race

2026 UCI Women's World Tour, race 10 of 26
- Event poster with previous winner Elisa Longo Borghini

Race details
- Dates: 1 April 2026
- Stages: 1
- Distance: 128.8 km (80.0 mi)
- Winning time: 3h 09' 12"

Results
	Winner	Marlen Reusser (SUI)	(Movistar Team)
	Second	Demi Vollering (NED)	(FDJ United–Suez)
	Third	Lieke Nooijen (NED)	(Visma–Lease a Bike)

The 2026 Dwars door Vlaanderen for Women was a road cycling one-day race that took place on 1 April. It was the 14th edition of the women's Dwars door Vlaanderen and the 10th event in the 2026 UCI Women's World Tour. The race was part of the UCI Women's World Tour for the first time, having previously been part of the UCI Women's ProSeries.

The race was won by Swiss rider Marlen Reusser of Movistar Team ahead of Demi Vollering and Lieke Nooijen in a three-way sprint.

== Teams ==
Fourteen UCI Women's WorldTeams and five UCI Women's ProTeams took part in the race.

UCI Women's WorldTeams

- AG Insurance–Soudal
- Canyon//SRAM Zondacrypto
- EF Education–Oatly
- FDJ United–Suez
- Fenix–Premier Tech
- Human Powered Health
- Lidl–Trek
- Liv AlUla Jayco
- Movistar Team
- Team Picnic–PostNL
- Team SD Worx–Protime
- UAE Team ADQ
- Uno-X Mobility
- Visma–Lease a Bike

UCI Women's ProTeams

- Laboral Kutxa–Fundación Euskadi
- Lotto–Intermarché Ladies
- Ma Petite Entreprise
- Mayenne Monbana My Pie
- VolkerWessels Cycling Team

== Result ==
Result
Rank	Rider	Team	Time
1	Marlen Reusser (SUI)	Movistar Team	3h 09' 12"
2	Demi Vollering (NED)	FDJ United–Suez	+ 0"
3	Lieke Nooijen (NED)	Visma–Lease a Bike	+ 0"
4	Zoe Bäckstedt (GBR)	Canyon//SRAM Zondacrypto	+ 7"
5	Eline Jansen (NED)	VolkerWessels Cycling Team	+ 7"
6	Cat Ferguson (GBR)	Movistar Team	+ 7"
7	Charlotte Kool (NED)	Fenix–Premier Tech	+ 7"
8	Franziska Koch (GER)	FDJ United–Suez	+ 7"
9	Karlijn Swinkels (NED)	UAE Team ADQ	+ 7"
10	Thalita de Jong (NED)	Human Powered Health	+ 7"
