= Elena Hartmann =

Swiss cyclist

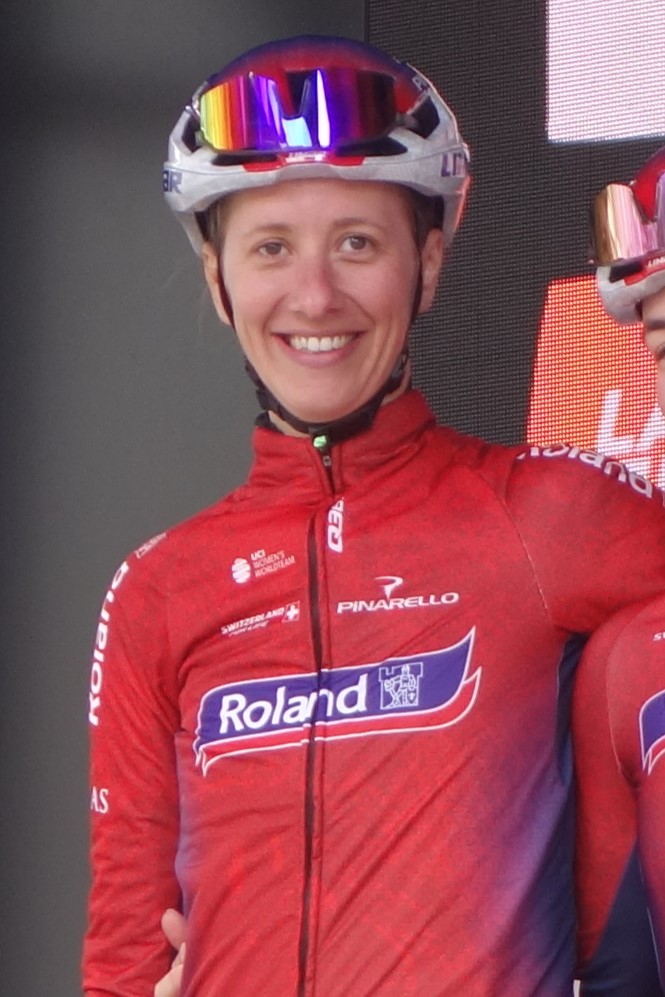
- Hartmann in 2024

Personal information
- Born: 17 April 1994 (age 32)
- Height: 1.78 m (5 ft 10 in)
- Weight: 56 kg (123 lb)

Cycling career
- Sport: Cycling
- Current team: Ceratizit Pro Cycling
- Discipline: Road
- Role: Rider
- Rider type: Time trialist

Professional teams
- 2023: Israel Premier Tech Roland Development
- 2023–2024: Israel Premier Tech Roland
- 2025–: Ceratizit Pro Cycling

Major wins
- One-day races and Classics National Time Trial Championships (2022–2024)

Elena Hartmann (born 12 December 1990) is a Swiss professional racing cyclist, who currently rides for UCI Women's WorldTeam Ceratizit Pro Cycling.

== Major results ==
2021
5th Time trial, National Road Championships
2022
1st Time trial, National Road Championships
6th Chrono des Nations
9th Time trial, UEC European Road Championships
2023
National Road Championships

1st Time trial
2nd Road race

1st Tour de Berlin Feminin
4th Chrono des Nations
6th Chrono Féminin de la Gatineau
2024
National Road Championships

1st Time trial
4th Road race

1st Overall Vuelta a El Salvador

1st Mountains classification
1st Prologue & Stage 1

1st Grand Prix Presidente
4th Grand Prix MOPT
8th Gran Premio Ciudad de Eibar
8th Costa De Almería
