= Roland Cycling =

Swiss cycling team

Team information
- UCI code: CGS
- Registered: Switzerland
- Founded: 2018
- Discipline: Road
- Status: UCI Women's Team (2018–2019); UCI Women's Continental Team (2020–2022); UCI Women's WorldTeam (2023–)

Key personnel
- Team managers: Sergey Klimov; Loïc Hugentobler; Sari Saarelainen

Team name history
- 2018 2018 2019–2021 2022 2023 2024–: Cogeas; Cogeas–Mettler Pro Cycling Team; Cogeas–Mettler–Look; Roland Cogeas Edelweiss Squad; Israel Premier Tech Roland; Roland Cycling

Roland Cycling (UCI team code: CGS) is a professional women's cycling team based in Switzerland which competes in elite road bicycle racing events such as the UCI Women's World Tour.

== Team roster ==
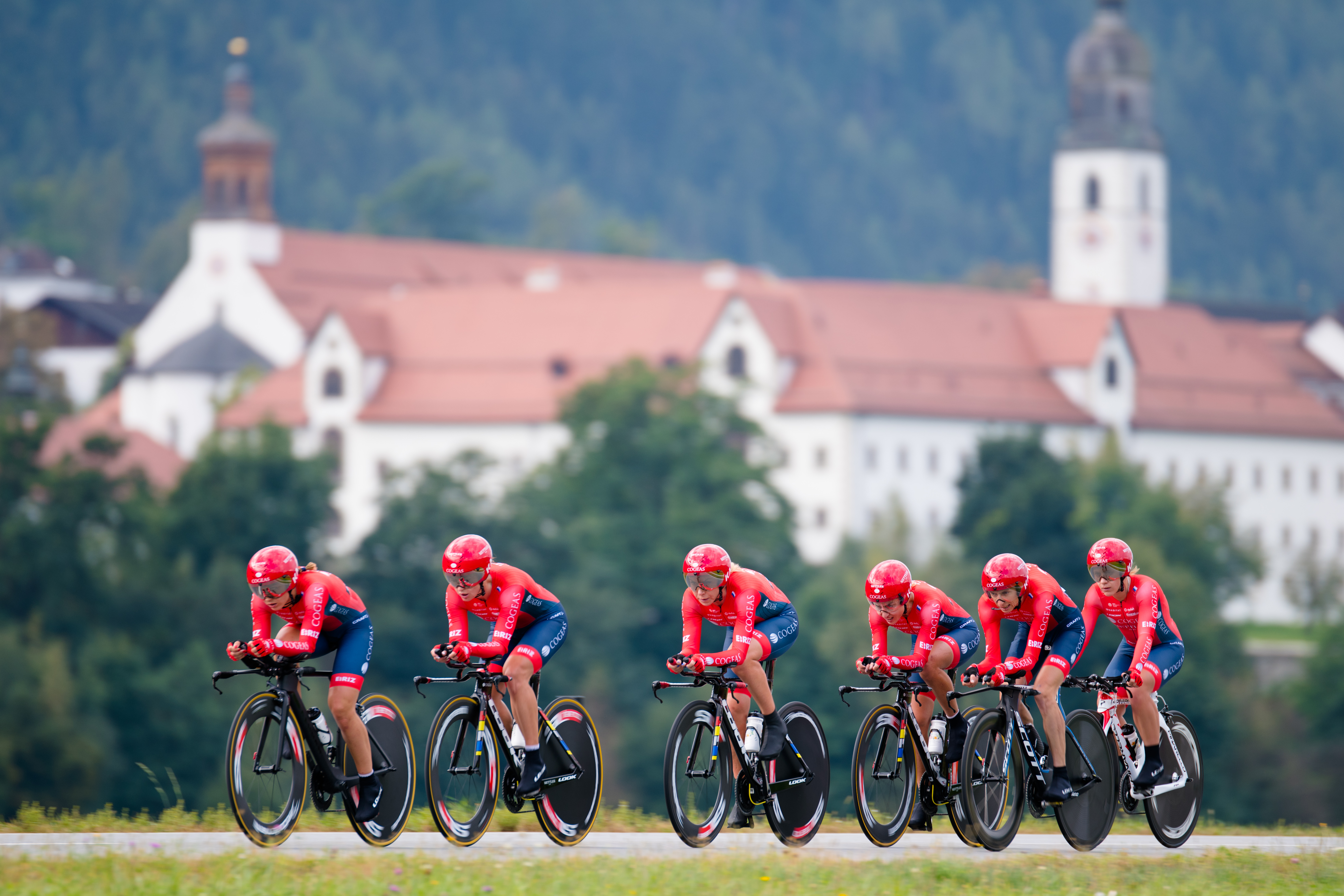
The team at the 2018 UCI Road World Championships.

As of 25 January 2025.

Rider	Date of birth
Antri Christoforou (CYP)	2 April 1992 (age 34)
Morgane Coston (FRA)	28 December 1990 (age 35)
Tamara Dronova (RUS)	13 August 1993 (age 33)
Giulia Giuliani (ITA)	5 July 2002 (age 24)
Mia Griffin (IRL)	30 December 1998 (age 27)
Elena Pirrone (ITA)	21 February 1999 (age 27)

Rider	Date of birth
Vittoria Ruffilli (ITA)	3 April 2002 (age 24)
Kaja Rysz (POL)	10 April 1999 (age 27)
Petra Stiasny (SUI)	10 September 2001 (age 24)
Sylvie Swinkels (NED)	31 July 2000 (age 26)
Giorgia Vettorello (ITA)	6 July 2000 (age 26)

== Major results ==
2018
Overall The Princess Maha Chackri Sirindhorn's Cup "Women's Tour of Thailand", Olga Zabelinskaya
Stage 3 (ITT) Gracia–Orlová, Olga Zabelinskaya
Grand Prix Fémin'Ain d'Izernore, Elyzaveta Oshurkova
VR Women ITT, Antri Christoforou
Ljubljana–Domžale–Ljubljana TT, Olga Zabelinskaya
Youth classification Tour de Feminin-O cenu Českého Švýcarska, Mariia Novolodskaia
Chrono des Nations, Olga Zabelinskaya
2019
Scorpions' Pass Time Trial, Antri Christoforou
Aphrodite Cycling Race Individual Time Trial, Olga Zabelinskaya
Aphrodite Sanctuary Cycling Race, Olga Zabelinskaya
2020
GP Alanya, Diana Klimova
GP Velo Alanya, Diana Klimova
Grand Prix Mount Erciyes 2200 mt, Maria Novolodskaya
Grand Prix World's Best High Altitude, Maria Novolodskaya
2021
Germenica GP, Olga Zabelinskaya
Grand Prix Erciyes, Tamara Dronova
Grand Prix Kayseri, Olga Zabelinskaya
UCI Track World Cup – Saint Petersburg (Madison), Gulnaz Khatuntseva
UCI Track World Cup – Saint Petersburg (Madison), Diana Klimova
2023
reVolta, Claire Steels
Stages 1 & 2 Vuelta Ciclista Andalucia Ruta Del Sol, Tamara Dronova
Tour de Berlin Feminin, Elena Hartmann
Women's Cycling Grand Prix Stuttgart & Region, Elena Pirrone
Chrono Féminin de la Gatineau, Anna Kiesenhofer
2024
Grand Prix Surf City El Salvador, Antri Christoforou
Grand Prix Presidente, Elena Hartmann
Overall Tour El Salvador, Elena Hartmann

Prologue & Stage 1, Elena Hartmann
Stages 3 & 4, Tamara Dronova

== Continental & National champions ==
2018
Cyprus Time Trial, Antri Christoforou
Cyprus Road Race, Antri Christoforou
Russia Time Trial, Olga Zabelinskaya
Russia Track (Omnium), Gulnaz Badykova
Russia Track (Team Pursuit), Evgenia Romanyuta
Russia Track (Team Pursuit), Gulnaz Badykova
Russia Track (Madison), Gulnaz Badykova
European U23 Track (Madison), Maria Novolodskaya
2019
Asian Track (Points Race), Olga Zabelinskaya
Cyprus Time Trial, Antri Christoforou
Cyprus Road Race, Antri Christoforou
Uzbekistan Road Race, Olga Zabelinskaya
Uzbekistan Time Trial, Olga Zabelinskaya
2020
Russia Time Trial, Elizaveta Oshurkova
Croatia Time Trial, Mia Radotić
Russia Road Race, Diana Klimova
European U23 Track (Omnium), Maria Novolodskaya
2021
Russia Time Trial, Tamara Dronova
Croatia Time Trial, Mia Radotić
Russia Track (Omnium), Gulnaz Khatuntseva
2022
Switzerland Road Race, Caroline Baur
2023
Austria Time Trial, Anna Kiesenhofer
Switzerland Time Trial, Elena Hartmann
2024
Switzerland Time Trial, Elena Hartmann
Austria Time Trial, Anna Kiesenhofer
Austria Road Race, Anna Kiesenhofer
Cyprus Time Trial, Antri Christoforou
Cyprus Road Race, Antri Christoforou

== Israel Premier Tech Roland Development ==
Israel Premier Tech Roland Development
Team information
- Registered: Switzerland
- Founded: 2023
- Discipline: Road
- Status: UCI Women's Continental Team (2023–)

Team name history
- 2023–: Israel Premier Tech Roland Development

Israel Premier Tech Roland Development (UCI team code: COG) is a professional women's development cycling team based in Switzerland which competes in elite road bicycle racing events with the aim of developing younger riders.

== National Champions ==
2023
Israel U23 Time Trial, Adar Shriki
