= Anna Kiesenhofer =

Austrian cyclist (born 1991)

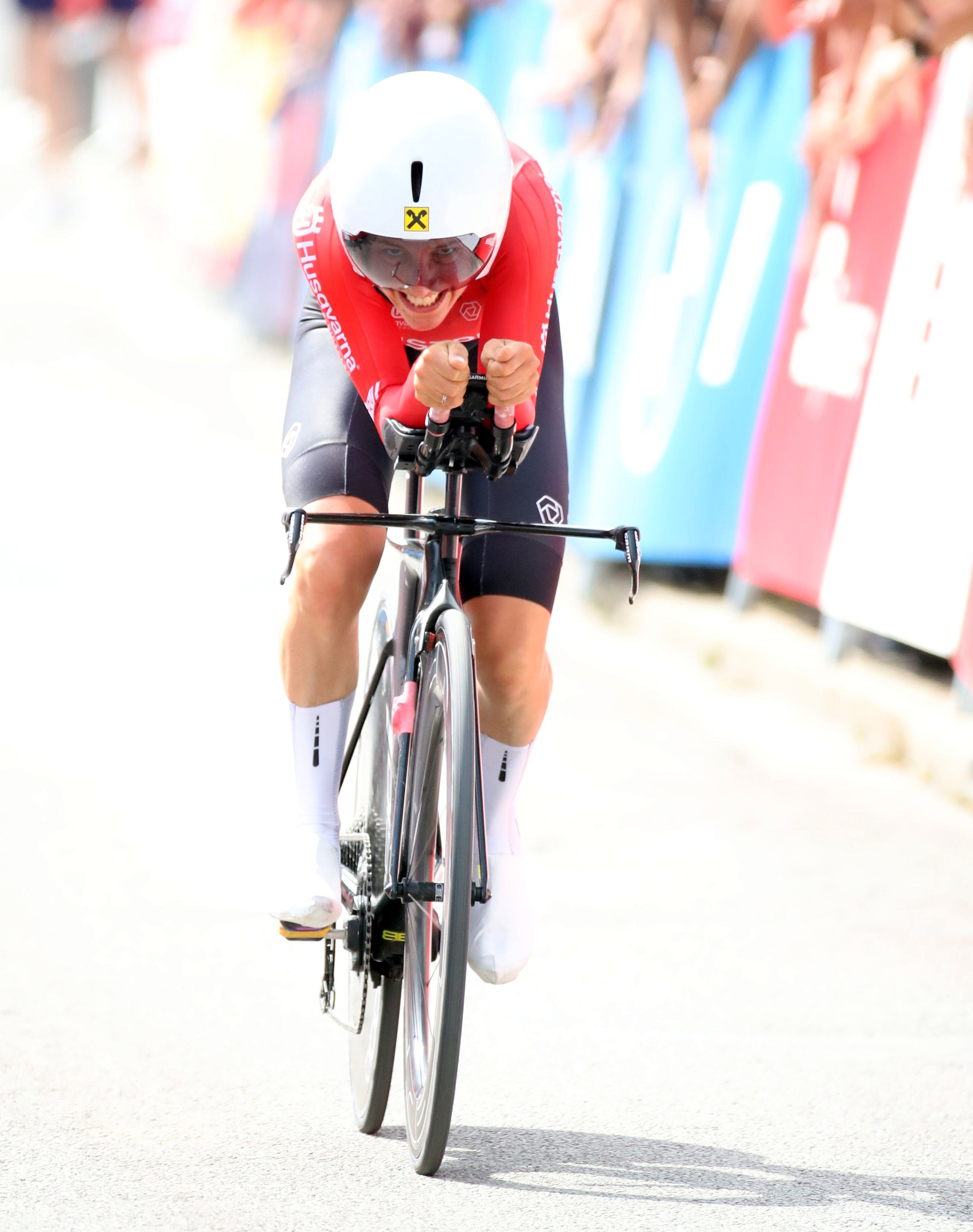
- Kiesenhofer at the 2022 European Championships

Personal information
- Born: 14 February 1991 (age 35) Niederkreuzstetten, Austria

Cycling career
- Sport: Cycling
- Discipline: Road
- Role: Rider
- Rider type: Time trialist

Amateur teams
- 2015–2016: —
- 2018–2019: —
- 2020: Cookina–Graz
- 2021–2022: —

Professional teams
- 2017: Lotto–Soudal Ladies
- 2023–2024: Israel Premier Tech Roland

Major wins
- One-day races and Classics Olympic Road Race (2020) National Road Race Championships (2019, 2024) National Time Trial Championships (2019, 2020, 2021, 2023, 2024)
Medal record
Women's road cycling
Representing Austria
Olympic Games
Gold medal – first place	2020 Tokyo	Road race

Anna Kiesenhofer (German pronunciation: [ˈanaː ˈkiːsn̩ˌhoːfɐ]; born 14 February 1991) is an Austrian professional cyclist and mathematician, who last rode for UCI Women's WorldTeam Roland Le Dévoluy.

Kiesenhofer gained fame when she won the gold medal in the women's individual road race at the 2020 Summer Olympics, the first Summer Olympics gold medal for Austria since 2004 and their first cycling Olympic gold medal since 1896. Unfancied for a medal pre-race, she attacked in the first seconds of the event and soloed to victory, her pursuers mistakenly unaware of her position, in a win described as "one of the greatest upsets in Olympics and cycling history".

== Academic career ==
Kiesenhofer studied mathematics at the Vienna University of Technology (2008–11), completing her Master's degree at Emmanuel College, Cambridge (2011–12). She earned her PhD at the Polytechnic University of Catalonia with her thesis on Integrable systems on b-symplectic manifolds in 2016. From 2017 to 2021 Kiesenhofer was a postdoctoral researcher at the École Polytechnique Fédérale de Lausanne (EPFL) and was part of a group researching nonlinear partial differential equations which arise in mathematical physics. Kiesenhofer has authored several scholarly journal articles including:

- Braddell, R., Kiesenhofer, A., & Miranda, E. (2020). $b$-Structures on Lie groups and Poisson reduction. arXiv:2010.04770
- Kiesenhofer, A., & Krieger, J. (2021). Small data global regularity for half-wave maps in $n=4$ dimensions. Communications in Partial Differential Equations, 46(12), 2305–2324. doi:10.1080/03605302.2021.1936021
- Braddell, R., Kiesenhofer, A., & Miranda, E. (2018). A $b$-symplectic slice theorem. arXiv:1811.11894
- Kiesenhofer, A., & Miranda, E. (2017). Cotangent Models for Integrable Systems. Communications in Mathematical Physics, 350(3), 1123–1145. doi:10.1007/s00220-016-2720-x
- Kiesenhofer, A., & Miranda, E. (2016). Noncommutative integrable systems on b-symplectic manifolds. Regular & Chaotic Dynamics, 21(6), 643–659. doi:10.1134/S1560354716060058

== Cycling career ==
Kiesenhofer participated in triathlon and duathlon from 2011 to 2013. After an injury, she had to limit her running and therefore concentrated on cycling from 2014. She joined the Catalan team Frigoríficos Costa Brava – Naturalium. In 2015 she entered the Tour de l'Ardèche but she was the victim of a fall on the first stage. She failed to recover and after several difficult stages decided to withdraw.

In 2016, she won the Coupe d'Espagne. In September, she took part in the Tour de l'Ardèche in the international team. On the third stage, the first breakaway started at the 12th kilometer. It was composed of Dani Christmas, Anna Plichta, Sara Olsson, Vita Heine and Silvia Valsecchi. Twenty kilometers away, they were joined by Kiesenhofer. In the descent of the pass of Murs, the groups were seven minutes and twenty-five seconds ahead. After Blavac, Anna Plichta went off alone and she had a lead of a minute thirty at the foot of Mont Ventoux. On the ascent, Kiesenhofer joined her. She won the stage by almost four minutes over Flávia Oliveira and she took the lead in the overall standings. The next day, Flávia Oliveira escaped in turn and she took Kiesenhofer's pink jersey. She kept her second place in the overall standings until the end of the race.

In July 2021, as Austria's sole representative in the 137 km-long Olympic women's road race in Tokyo, Japan, she won the gold medal, crossing the finish line 75 seconds in front of Annemiek van Vleuten of the Netherlands. Kiesenhofer trained for the event without a coach or a professional team, and was not viewed as a contender to win a medal. In the race, she initiated a breakaway from the start, and was joined by four other competitors. With 86 km to go, the leading group, now down to Kiesenhofer, Omer Shapira, and Anna Plichta, formed a 10-minute advantage over the chasing peloton. Kiesenhofer broke away by herself for the final 41 km while climbing the Kagosaka Pass, dropping Shapira and Plichta, who were later caught by the peloton. Many in the peloton, including silver medalist Van Vleuten who celebrated mistakenly thinking she had won the gold, finished the race unaware that Kiesenhofer was still in front of them. Kiesenhofer later said she "couldn't believe" she won adding that she would have been happy with a top 25 finish.

After racing as a privateer in 2022, Kiesenhofer rode for Roland Cycling team for the 2023 and 2024 seasons. In 2025, she joined Team Picnic PostNL as a trainer.

== Major results ==
2015
1st Overall Semaine Cantalienne

1st Stages 2 & 6

2016
2nd Overall Tour Cycliste Féminin International de l'Ardèche

1st Stage 3

2nd Time trial, National Road Championships
Copa de España

2nd Gran Premio Comunidad de Cantabria
2nd Trofeo Zamora
4th Trofeo Gobierno de La Rioja
5th Zizurkil-Villabona
7th Trofeo Ria de Marin
10th Trofeo Bicicletas Jonny

2018
5th Thun-West Time trial
2019
National Road Championships

1st Road race
1st Time trial

4th Thun-West Time trial
5th Ljubljana–Domžale–Ljubljana TT
5th Time trial, UEC European Road Championships
8th Chrono des Nations
2020
1st Time trial, National Road Championships
1st Hochkar Bergeinzelzeitfahren Time trial
3rd Overall Tour Cycliste Féminin International de l'Ardèche
2021
1st Road race, Olympic Games
1st Time trial, National Road Championships
2nd Chrono des Nations
7th Time trial, UEC European Road Championships
2022
National Road Championships

2nd Time trial
2nd Road race

5th Time trial, UEC European Road Championships
10th UCI Road World Championships – Women's time trial
2023
National Road Championships

1st Time trial
5th Road race

1st Chrono des Nations
1st Chrono Féminin de la Gatineau
1st Chrono de la Sionge
3rd Championnats d'Europe des Grimpeurs
6th Time trial, UEC European Road Championships
2024
National Road Championships

1st Road race
1st Time trial

3rd Grand Prix MOPT

== Awards ==
Kiesenhofer was awarded the Niki prize as Sportlerin des Jahres 2021 (Sportswoman of the Year) by Sports Media Austria, an association of sports journalists. That year she was also named Lower Austria's sportswoman of the year and won the international success category at Die Presse's Austrian of the Year awards.

Awards
Preceded by Ivona Dadic	Austrian Sportswoman of the year 2021	Succeeded by Incumbent
