= Mireia Benito =

Spanish cyclist (born 1996)

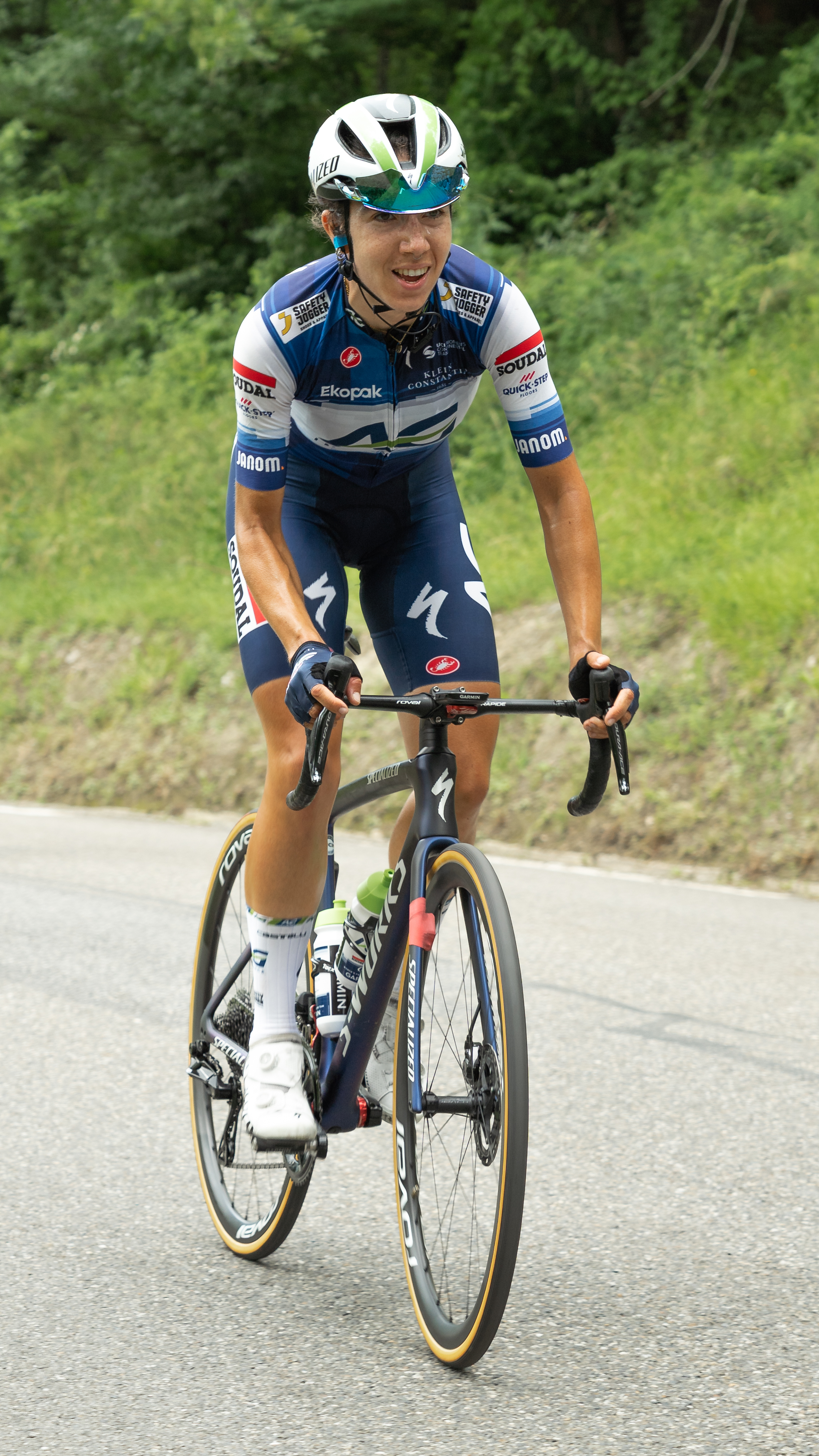
- Benito in 2023

Personal information
- Full name: Mireia Benito Pellicer
- Born: 30 December 1996 (age 29) Baix Penedès, Spain

Cycling career
- Sport: Cycling
- Current team: AG Insurance–Soudal
- Discipline: Road
- Role: Rider

Professional teams
- 2019–2022: Massi–Tactic
- 2023–: AG Insurance–Soudal–Quick-Step

Major wins
- One-day races and Classics National Time Trial Championships (2023–2025)

Mireia Benito Pellicer (born 30 December 1996) is a Spanish professional racing cyclist, who currently rides for UCI Women's WorldTeam AG Insurance–Soudal. In May 2022, when she was racing for UCI Women's Continental Team Massi–Tactic, she became the first rider of the team to get on the podium of a UCI Women's World Tour race, when she was awarded the combativity prize at Itzulia Women.

In 2023, she moved to the AG Insurance–Soudal, a professional cycling team that allowed her to take part in more races. She has received a bachelor's degree in Biotechnology and master's degrees in Molecular Biology and Biomedicine, and Science Education at the University of Girona.

== Major results ==
2019
3rd Road race, National Road Championships
2021
5th Time trial, National Road Championships
2022
4th Navarra Women's Elite Classics
5th Road race, National Road Championships
2023 (1 pro win)
National Road Championships

1st Time trial
3rd Road race

2024 (1)
National Road Championships

1st Time trial
5th Road race

1st Gravel Tres Cantos
4th Gran Premio Ciudad de Eibar
6th Overall Thüringen Ladies Tour
8th Overall Vuelta a Andalucía
2025 (1)
1st Time trial, National Road Championships
1st Gravel Tres Cantos
10th UCI Road World Championships – Women's time trial
2026
3rd Cadel Evans Great Ocean Road Race
4th Overall Vuelta a Burgos Feminas
9th Tour Down Under
