= Juliette Berthet =

French cyclist (born 1998)

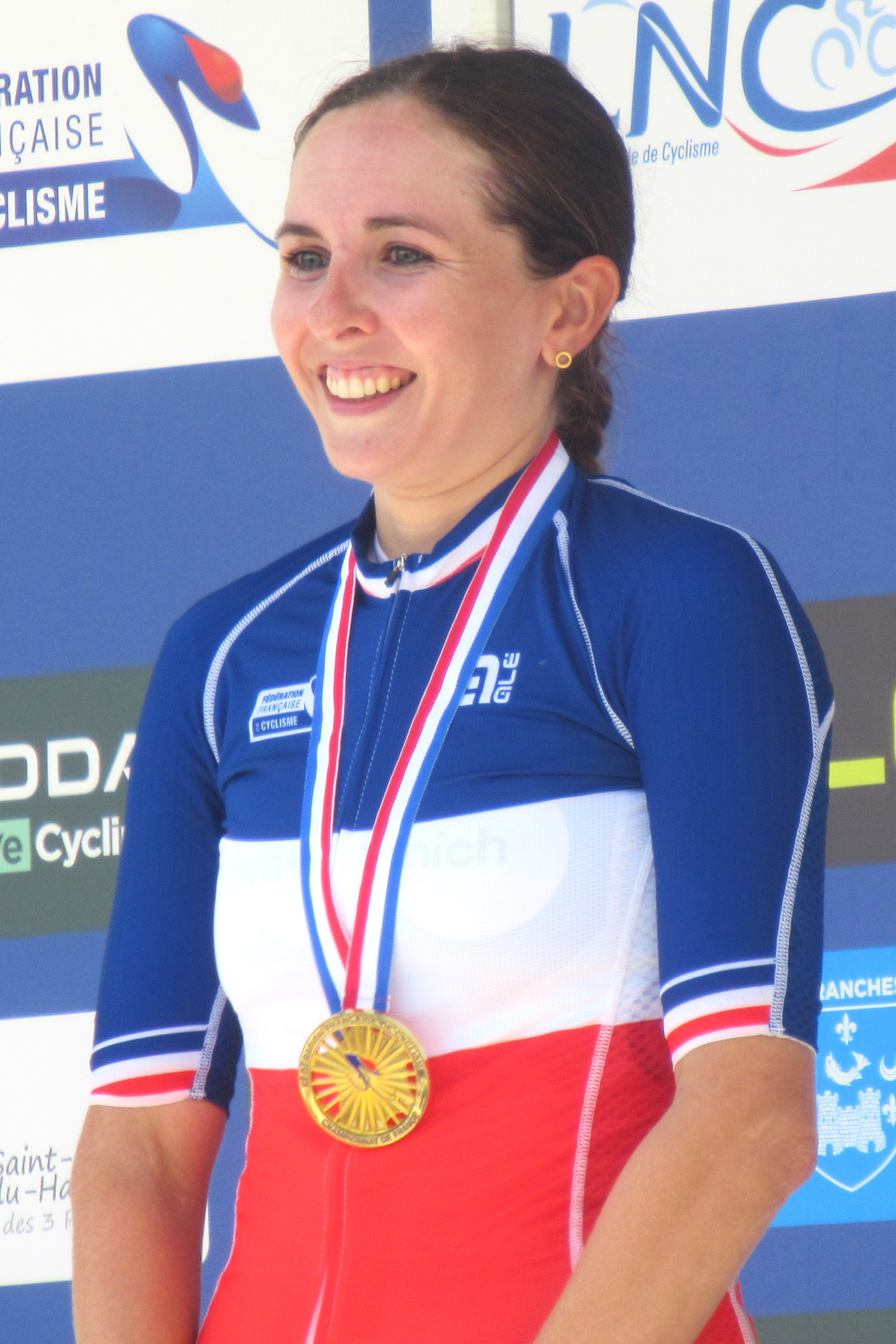
- Berthet in 2024

Personal information
- Born: Juliette Labous; 4 November 1998 (age 28) Roche-lez-Beaupré, France
- Height: 165 cm (5 ft 5 in)
- Weight: 54 kg (119 lb)

Cycling career
- Sport: Cycling
- Current team: FDJ United–Suez
- Disciplines: Road; Cyclo-cross
- Role: Rider

Amateur team
- 2008–2016: VC Morteau Montbenoit

Professional teams
- 2017–2024: Team Sunweb
- 2025–: FDJ–Suez

Major wins
- Major Tours Giro d'Italia Youth classification (2019) 1 individual stage (2022) One-day races and Classics National Road Race Championships (2024) National Time Trial Championships (2020)
Medal record
Women's road bicycle racing
Representing France
World Championships
Silver medal – second place	2023 Glasgow	Mixed team relay
Silver medal – second place	2025 Kigali	Mixed team relay
European Championships
Gold medal – first place	2023 Drenthe	Mixed team relay
Gold medal – first place	2025 Guilherand-Granges	Mixed team relay
Bronze medal – third place	2026 Ljubljana	Time trial

Juliette Berthet, née Labous (French: [ʒyljɛt bɛʁtɛ]; born 4 November 1998), is a French racing cyclist, who rides for UCI Women's WorldTeam FDJ United–Suez. Berthet won the French National Time Trial Championship in 2020, and the French National Road Race Championship in 2024.

== Personal life ==
In October 2025, she married fellow professional cyclist Clément Berthet, and began competing under her married name from the start of the 2026 season.

== Major results ==
2015
National Junior Road Championships

1st Time trial
5th Road race

2nd Trofeo Alfredo Binda Juniors
UEC European Junior Road Championships

4th Road race
5th Time trial

5th Time trial, UCI Road World Junior Championships
2016
National Junior Road Championships

1st Time trial
1st Road race

1st Overall Albstadt-Frauen-Etappenrennen

1st Stage 2b

3rd Time trial, UCI Road World Junior Championships
3rd Time trial, UEC European Junior Road Championships
2017
1st Stage 5 Tour de Feminin-O cenu Českého Švýcarska
4th Time trial, National Road Championships
UEC European Under-23 Road Championships

6th Road race
10th Time trial

9th Overall Tour of Norway
9th La Classique Morbihan
2018
1st Stage 1 (TTT) Giro Rosa
2nd Time trial, National Road Championships
3rd Open de Suède Vårgårda TTT
7th Overall Tour de Yorkshire
9th Overall Tour of California
2019
1st Young rider classification, Giro Rosa
1st Young rider classification, Tour of California
3rd Open de Suède Vårgårda TTT
3rd Overall Tour de Bretagne

1st Young rider classification

4th Time trial, National Road Championships
7th La Classique Morbihan
2020
1st Time trial, National Road Championships
1st Time trial, National Under-23 Road Championships
6th Time trial, UEC European Road Championships
8th Liège–Bastogne–Liège
2021
2nd Overall The Women's Tour
6th UCI Road World Championships – Women's time trial
6th La Flèche Wallonne
6th Brabantse Pijl
8th Overall Tour of Norway
10th Overall Festival Elsy Jacobs
2022
1st Overall Vuelta a Burgos
1st Stage 6 Giro Donne
4th Overall Tour de France
5th Brabantse Pijl
7th Road race, UCI Road World Championships
9th Overall Tour de Romandie
10th Overall Setmana Ciclista Valenciana
2023
UEC European Road Championships

1st Team relay
9th Road race

2nd Overall Giro Donne
5th UCI Road World Championships – Women's time trial
5th Overall Tour de France
7th Overall La Vuelta Femenina
2024
1st Road race, National Road Championships
3rd Overall Itzulia Women
3rd Giro dell'Emilia
4th UCI Road World Championships – Mixed team relay
4th Overall La Vuelta Femenina
4th Time trial, Olympic Games
5th Overall Giro d'Italia
5th Overall Tour de Suisse
6th Overall Tour de Romandie
6th Tre Valli Varesine
7th La Flèche Wallonne
8th Liège–Bastogne–Liège
9th UCI Road World Championships – Women's time trial
9th Overall Tour de France
2025
4th Strade Bianche
4th Amstel Gold Race
5th Tre Valli Varesine
7th Overall Tour de France
7th UCI Road World Championships – Women's time trial
2026
1st Overall Faun Tour Femmes

1st Stage 2 & 3

UCI Road World Championships

2nd Team relay
5th Road race

5th Overall La Vuelta Femenina
8th Overall Itzulia Women
8th Overall Tour de Suisse
9th Liège–Bastogne–Liège
10th Overall UAE Tour
