= 2025 Giro d'Italia Women, Stage 1 to Stage 8 =

Stage of cycling race

The 2025 Giro d'Italia Women is the 36th edition of the Giro d'Italia Women, a women's road cycling stage race in Italy. The race took place from 6 to 13 July 2025 and was the 21st race in the 2025 UCI Women's World Tour calendar. The race was organised by RCS Sport, which also organised the men's Giro d'Italia.

== Classification standings ==
Legend
Denotes the leader of the general classification	Denotes the leader of the mountains classification
Denotes the leader of the points classification	Denotes the leader of the young rider classification

== Stage 1 ==
6 July 2025 — Bergamo, 13.6 km (8.5 mi) (ITT)

Stage 1 Result
Rank	Rider	Team	Time
1	Marlen Reusser (SUI)	Movistar Team	17' 22"
2	Lotte Kopecky (BEL)	Team SD Worx–Protime	+ 12"
3	Elisa Longo Borghini (ITA)	UAE Team ADQ	+ 16"
4	Anna van der Breggen (NED)	Team SD Worx–Protime	+ 20"
5	Lieke Nooijen (NED)	Visma–Lease a Bike	+ 24"
6	Anna Henderson (GBR)	Lidl–Trek	+ 27"
7	Christina Schweinberger (AUT)	Fenix–Deceuninck	+ 30"
8	Alessia Vigilia (ITA)	FDJ–Suez	+ 40"
9	Monica Trinca Colonel (ITA)	Liv AlUla Jayco	+ 41"
10	Shirin van Anrooij (NED)	Lidl–Trek	+ 41"

General classification after Stage 1
Rank	Rider	Team	Time
1	Marlen Reusser (SUI)	Movistar Team	17' 22"
2	Lotte Kopecky (BEL)	Team SD Worx–Protime	+ 12"
3	Elisa Longo Borghini (ITA)	UAE Team ADQ	+ 16"
4	Anna van der Breggen (NED)	Team SD Worx–Protime	+ 20"
5	Lieke Nooijen (NED)	Visma–Lease a Bike	+ 24"
6	Anna Henderson (GBR)	Lidl–Trek	+ 27"
7	Christina Schweinberger (AUT)	Fenix–Deceuninck	+ 30"
8	Alessia Vigilia (ITA)	FDJ–Suez	+ 40"
9	Monica Trinca Colonel (ITA)	Liv AlUla Jayco	+ 41"
10	Shirin van Anrooij (NED)	Lidl–Trek	+ 41"

== Stage 2 ==
7 July 2025 — Clusone to Aprica, 99 km (62 mi)

Stage 2 Result
Rank	Rider	Team	Time
1	Anna Henderson (GBR)	Lidl–Trek	2h 24' 30"
2	Dilyxine Miermont (FRA)	Ceratizit Pro Cycling	+ 0"
3	Soraya Paladin (ITA)	Canyon//SRAM Zondacrypto	+ 26"
4	Eleonora Ciabocco (ITA)	Team Picnic–PostNL	+ 26"
5	Marlen Reusser (SUI)	Movistar Team	+ 26"
6	Elisa Longo Borghini (ITA)	UAE Team ADQ	+ 26"
7	Ashleigh Moolman (RSA)	AG Insurance–Soudal	+ 26"
8	Juliette Labous (FRA)	FDJ–Suez	+ 26"
9	Yara Kastelijn (NED)	Fenix–Deceuninck	+ 26"
10	Shirin van Anrooij (NED)	Lidl–Trek	+ 26"

General classification after Stage 2
Rank	Rider	Team	Time
1	Anna Henderson (GBR)	Lidl–Trek	2h 42' 03"
2	Marlen Reusser (SUI)	Movistar Team	+ 15"
3	Elisa Longo Borghini (ITA)	UAE Team ADQ	+ 31"
4	Anna van der Breggen (NED)	Team SD Worx–Protime	+ 35"
5	Monica Trinca Colonel (ITA)	Liv AlUla Jayco	+ 56"
6	Shirin van Anrooij (NED)	Lidl–Trek	+ 56"
7	Katrine Aalerud (NOR)	Uno-X Mobility	+ 59"
8	Antonia Niedermaier (GER)	Canyon//SRAM Zondacrypto	+ 1' 03"
9	Juliette Labous (FRA)	FDJ–Suez	+ 1' 06"
10	Dilyxine Miermont (FRA)	Ceratizit Pro Cycling	+ 1' 10"

== Stage 3 ==
8 July 2025 — Vezza d'Oglio to Trento, 124 km (77 mi)

Stage 3 Result
Rank	Rider	Team	Time
1	Lorena Wiebes (NED)	Team SD Worx–Protime	2h 59' 07"
2	Josie Nelson (GBR)	Team Picnic–PostNL	+ 0"
3	Lotte Kopecky (BEL)	Team SD Worx–Protime	+ 26"
4	Elisa Longo Borghini (ITA)	UAE Team ADQ	+ 0"
5	Babette van der Wolf (NED)	EF Education–Oatly	+ 0"
6	Christina Schweinberger (AUT)	Fenix–Deceuninck	+ 0"
7	Barbara Guarischi (ITA)	Team SD Worx–Protime	+ 0"
8	Eleonora Gasparrini (ITA)	UAE Team ADQ	+ 0"
9	Marianne Vos (NED)	Visma–Lease a Bike	+ 0"
10	Marthe Truyen (BEL)	Fenix–Deceuninck	+ 0"

General classification after Stage 3
Rank	Rider	Team	Time
1	Anna Henderson (GBR)	Lidl–Trek	5h 41' 10"
2	Marlen Reusser (SUI)	Movistar Team	+ 13"
3	Elisa Longo Borghini (ITA)	UAE Team ADQ	+ 31"
4	Anna van der Breggen (NED)	Team SD Worx–Protime	+ 35"
5	Monica Trinca Colonel (ITA)	Liv AlUla Jayco	+ 56"
6	Shirin van Anrooij (NED)	Lidl–Trek	+ 56"
7	Katrine Aalerud (NOR)	Uno-X Mobility	+ 59"
8	Antonia Niedermaier (GER)	Canyon//SRAM Zondacrypto	+ 1' 03"
9	Juliette Labous (FRA)	FDJ–Suez	+ 1' 06"
10	Dilyxine Miermont (FRA)	Ceratizit Pro Cycling	+ 1' 10"

== Stage 4 ==
9 July 2025 — Castello Tesino to Pianezze (Valdobbiadene), 156 km (97 mi)

Stage 4 Result
Rank	Rider	Team	Time
1	Sarah Gigante (AUS)	AG Insurance–Soudal	3h 56' 22"
2	Elisa Longo Borghini (ITA)	UAE Team ADQ	+ 25"
3	Marlen Reusser (SUI)	Movistar Team	+ 25"
4	Antonia Niedermaier (GER)	Canyon//SRAM Zondacrypto	+ 34"
5	Pauliena Rooijakkers (NED)	Fenix–Deceuninck	+ 50"
6	Barbara Malcotti (ITA)	Human Powered Health	+ 56"
7	Isabella Holmgren (CAN)	Lidl–Trek	+ 1' 01"
8	Lore De Schepper (BEL)	AG Insurance–Soudal	+ 1' 01"
9	Yara Kastelijn (NED)	Fenix–Deceuninck	+ 1' 03"
10	Urška Žigart (SLO)	AG Insurance–Soudal	+ 1' 12"

General classification after Stage 4
Rank	Rider	Team	Time
1	Marlen Reusser (SUI)	Movistar Team	9h 38' 06"
2	Elisa Longo Borghini (ITA)	UAE Team ADQ	+ 16"
3	Sarah Gigante (AUS)	AG Insurance–Soudal	+ 34"
4	Antonia Niedermaier (GER)	Canyon//SRAM Zondacrypto	+ 1' 03"
5	Pauliena Rooijakkers (NED)	Fenix–Deceuninck	+ 1' 48"
6	Anna van der Breggen (NED)	Team SD Worx–Protime	+ 1' 53"
7	Yara Kastelijn (NED)	Fenix–Deceuninck	+ 1' 54"
8	Isabella Holmgren (CAN)	Lidl–Trek	+ 1' 57"
9	Lore De Schepper (BEL)	AG Insurance–Soudal	+ 2' 03"
10	Katrine Aalerud (NOR)	Uno-X Mobility	+ 2' 07"

== Stage 5 ==
10 July 2025 — Mirano to Monselice, 108 km (67 mi)

Stage 5 Result
Rank	Rider	Team	Time
1	Lorena Wiebes (NED)	Team SD Worx–Protime	2h 39' 08"
2	Marianne Vos (NED)	Visma–Lease a Bike	+ 0"
3	Liane Lippert (GER)	Movistar Team	+ 0"
4	Lotte Kopecky (BEL)	Team SD Worx–Protime	+ 0"
5	Marlen Reusser (SUI)	Movistar Team	+ 0"
6	Elisa Longo Borghini (ITA)	UAE Team ADQ	+ 0"
7	Anna van der Breggen (NED)	Team SD Worx–Protime	+ 0"
8	Franziska Brauße (GER)	Ceratizit Pro Cycling	+ 0"
9	Katia Ragusa (ITA)	Human Powered Health	+ 0"
10	Silvia Persico (ITA)	UAE Team ADQ	+ 0"

General classification after Stage 5
Rank	Rider	Team	Time
1	Marlen Reusser (SUI)	Movistar Team	12h 17' 14"
2	Elisa Longo Borghini (ITA)	UAE Team ADQ	+ 16"
3	Anna van der Breggen (NED)	Team SD Worx–Protime	+ 1' 53"
4	Katrine Aalerud (NOR)	Uno-X Mobility	+ 2' 07"
5	Sarah Gigante (AUS)	AG Insurance–Soudal	+ 2' 16"
6	Antonia Niedermaier (GER)	Canyon//SRAM Zondacrypto	+ 2' 45"
7	Silvia Persico (ITA)	UAE Team ADQ	+ 3' 21"
8	Pauliena Rooijakkers (NED)	Fenix–Deceuninck	+ 3' 30"
9	Yara Kastelijn (NED)	Fenix–Deceuninck	+ 3' 36"
10	Isabella Holmgren (CAN)	Lidl–Trek	+ 3' 39"

== Stage 6 ==
11 July 2025 — Bellaria to Igea Marina, 144 km (89 mi)

Stage 6 Result
Rank	Rider	Team	Time
1	Liane Lippert (GER)	Movistar Team	3h 53' 01"
2	Pauliena Rooijakkers (NED)	Fenix–Deceuninck	+ 2"
3	Shirin van Anrooij (NED)	Lidl–Trek	+ 46"
4	Silke Smulders (NED)	Liv AlUla Jayco	+ 1' 05"
5	Lieke Nooijen (NED)	Visma–Lease a Bike	+ 1' 16"
6	Sarah Van Dam (CAN)	Ceratizit–WNT Pro Cycling	+ 1' 24"
7	Juliette Labous (FRA)	FDJ–Suez	+ 1' 24"
8	Katrine Aalerud (NOR)	Uno-X Mobility	+ 1' 24"
9	Elisa Longo Borghini (ITA)	UAE Team ADQ	+ 1' 24"
10	Barbara Malcotti (ITA)	Human Powered Health	+ 1' 24"

General classification after Stage 6
Rank	Rider	Team	Time
1	Marlen Reusser (SUI)	Movistar Team	16h 11' 39"
2	Elisa Longo Borghini (ITA)	UAE Team ADQ	+ 16"
3	Anna van der Breggen (NED)	Team SD Worx–Protime	+ 1' 53"
4	Pauliena Rooijakkers (NED)	Fenix–Deceuninck	+ 2' 02"
5	Katrine Aalerud (NOR)	Uno-X Mobility	+ 2' 07"
6	Sarah Gigante (AUS)	AG Insurance–Soudal	+ 2' 16"
7	Antonia Niedermaier (GER)	Canyon//SRAM Zondacrypto	+ 2' 45"
8	Yara Kastelijn (NED)	Fenix–Deceuninck	+ 3' 36"
9	Isabella Holmgren (CAN)	Lidl–Trek	+ 3' 39"
10	Urška Žigart (SLO)	AG Insurance–Soudal	+ 3' 50"

== Stage 7 ==
12 July 2025 — Fermignano to Monte Nerone, 157 km (98 mi)

Stage 7 Result
Rank	Rider	Team	Time
1	Sarah Gigante (AUS)	AG Insurance–Soudal	4h 44' 14"
2	Elisa Longo Borghini (ITA)	UAE Team ADQ	+ 45"
3	Isabella Holmgren (CAN)	Lidl–Trek	+ 1' 14"
4	Marlen Reusser (SUI)	Movistar Team	+ 1' 17"
5	Antonia Niedermaier (GER)	Canyon//SRAM Zondacrypto	+ 1' 17"
6	Barbara Malcotti (ITA)	Human Powered Health	+ 1' 21"
7	Urška Žigart (SLO)	AG Insurance–Soudal	+ 1' 37"
8	Pauliena Rooijakkers (NED)	Fenix–Deceuninck	+ 1' 48"
9	Évita Muzic (FRA)	FDJ–Suez	+ 2' 17"
10	Anna van der Breggen (NED)	Team SD Worx–Protime	+ 2' 48"

General classification after Stage 7
Rank	Rider	Team	Time
1	Elisa Longo Borghini (ITA)	UAE Team ADQ	20h 56' 48"
2	Marlen Reusser (SUI)	Movistar Team	+ 22"
3	Sarah Gigante (AUS)	AG Insurance–Soudal	+ 1' 11"
4	Pauliena Rooijakkers (NED)	Fenix–Deceuninck	+ 2' 55"
5	Antonia Niedermaier (GER)	Canyon//SRAM Zondacrypto	+ 3' 07"
6	Anna van der Breggen (NED)	Team SD Worx–Protime	+ 3' 46"
7	Isabella Holmgren (CAN)	Lidl–Trek	+ 3' 54"
8	Urška Žigart (SLO)	AG Insurance–Soudal	+ 4' 32"
9	Barbara Malcotti (ITA)	Human Powered Health	+ 4' 44"
10	Katrine Aalerud (NOR)	Uno-X Mobility	+ 5' 01"

== Stage 8 ==
13 July 2025 — Forlì to Imola (Autodromo Enzo and Dino Ferrari), 138 km (86 mi)

Stage 8 Result
Rank	Rider	Team	Time
1	Liane Lippert (GER)	UAE Team ADQ	3h 40' 07"
2	Anna van der Breggen (NED)	Team SD Worx–Protime	+ 0"
3	Marlen Reusser (SUI)	Movistar Team	+ 8"
4	Elisa Longo Borghini (ITA)	UAE Team ADQ	+ 8"
5	Évita Muzic (FRA)	FDJ–Suez	+ 8"
6	Isabella Holmgren (CAN)	Lidl–Trek	+ 8"
7	Pauliena Rooijakkers (NED)	Fenix–Deceuninck	+ 8"
8	Silke Smulders (NED)	Liv AlUla Jayco	+ 8"
9	Antonia Niedermaier (GER)	Canyon//SRAM Zondacrypto	+ 8"
10	Sarah Gigante (AUS)	AG Insurance–Soudal	+ 8"

General classification after Stage 8
Rank	Rider	Team	Time
1	Elisa Longo Borghini (ITA)	UAE Team ADQ	24h 37' 03"
2	Marlen Reusser (SUI)	Movistar Team	+ 18"
3	Sarah Gigante (AUS)	AG Insurance–Soudal	+ 1' 11"
4	Pauliena Rooijakkers (NED)	Fenix–Deceuninck	+ 2' 55"
5	Antonia Niedermaier (GER)	Canyon//SRAM Zondacrypto	+ 3' 07"
6	Anna van der Breggen (NED)	Team SD Worx–Protime	+ 3' 32"
7	Isabella Holmgren (CAN)	Lidl–Trek	+ 3' 54"
8	Barbara Malcotti (ITA)	Human Powered Health	+ 4' 44"
9	Urška Žigart (SLO)	AG Insurance–Soudal	+ 4' 56"
10	Katrine Aalerud (NOR)	Uno-X Mobility	+ 5' 19"
