= List of teams and cyclists in the 2025 Giro d'Italia Women =

List of cyclists

The following is a list of teams and cyclists that competed in the 2025 Giro d'Italia Women.

== Teams ==
22 teams will participate in the race.

UCI Women's WorldTeams

- AG Insurance–Soudal
- Canyon//SRAM Zondacrypto
- Ceratizit Pro Cycling
- FDJ–Suez
- Fenix–Deceuninck
- Human Powered Health
- Lidl–Trek
- Liv AlUla Jayco
- Movistar Team
- Roland Le Dévoluy
- Team Picnic–PostNL
- Team SD Worx–Protime
- UAE Team ADQ
- Uno-X Mobility
- Visma–Lease a Bike

UCI Women's Pro Teams

- EF Education–Oatly
- Laboral Kutxa–Fundación Euskadi

UCI Women's Continental Teams

- Aromitalia 3T Vaiano
- BePink–Imatra–Bongioanni
- Isolmant–Premac–Vittoria
- Team Mendelspeck E-Work
- Top Girls Fassa Bortolo

== Cyclists ==
Legend
No.	Starting number worn by the rider during the Giro
Pos.	Position in the general classification
Time	Deficit to the winner of the general classification
‡	Denotes riders born on or after 1 January 2003 eligible for the young rider classification
General classification	Denotes the winner of the general classification
Points classification	Denotes the winner of the points classification
Mountains classification	Denotes the winner of the mountains classification
Young rider classification	Denotes the winner of the young rider classification (eligibility indicated by ‡)
DNS	Denotes a rider who did not start a stage, followed by the stage before which she withdrew
DNF	Denotes a rider who did not finish a stage, followed by the stage in which she withdrew
DSQ	Denotes a rider who was disqualified from the race, followed by the stage in which this occurred
OTL	Denotes a rider finished outside the time limit, followed by the stage in which they did so
Ages correct as of Sunday 6 July 2025, the date on which the Giro began

=== By starting number ===
No.	Name	Nationality	Team	Age	Pos.	Time	Ref.
1	Elisa Longo Borghini	Italy	UAE Team ADQ	33	1	24h 37' 03"	
2	Alena Amialiusik		UAE Team ADQ	36	DNF-8	–	
3	Brodie Chapman	Australia	UAE Team ADQ	34	43	+ 52' 24"	
4	Eleonora Camilla Gasparrini	Italy	UAE Team ADQ	23	50	+ 58' 10"	
5	Erica Magnaldi	Italy	UAE Team ADQ	32	24	+ 22' 12"	
6	Greta Marturano	Italy	UAE Team ADQ	27	DNF-2	–	
7	Silvia Persico	Italy	UAE Team ADQ	27	28	+ 27' 37"	
11	Ashleigh Moolman	South Africa	AG Insurance–Soudal	39	27	+ 27' 04"	
12	Mireia Benito	Spain	AG Insurance–Soudal	28	31	+ 33' 24"	
13	Lore De Schepper ‡	Belgium	AG Insurance–Soudal	19	22	+ 19' 13"	
14	Sarah Gigante	Australia	AG Insurance–Soudal	24	3	+ 1' 11"	
15	Alexandra Manly	Australia	AG Insurance–Soudal	29	92	+ 1h 43' 27"	
16	Gaia Masetti	Italy	AG Insurance–Soudal	23	80	+ 1h 27' 51"	
17	Urška Žigart	Slovenia	AG Insurance–Soudal	28	9	+ 4' 56"	
21	Irene Affolati	Italy	Aromitalia 3T Vaiano	23	DNF-7	–	
22	Fanny Bonini ‡	Italy	Aromitalia 3T Vaiano	22	112	+ 2h 17' 43"	
23	Lucia Brillante Romeo ‡	Italy	Aromitalia 3T Vaiano	19	109	+ 2h 10' 15"	
24	Rasa Leleivytė	Lithuania	Aromitalia 3T Vaiano	36	107	+ 2h 06' 04"	
25	Argiro Milaki	Greece	Aromitalia 3T Vaiano	33	117	+ 2h 24' 57"	
26	Hanna Tserakh		Aromitalia 3T Vaiano	26	DNF-3	–	
27	Valentina Venerucci	San Marino	Aromitalia 3T Vaiano	31	115	+ 2h 21' 06"	
31	Andrea Casagranda ‡	Italy	BePink–Imatra–Bongioanni	20	81	+ 1h 28' 11"	
32	Elisabeth Ebras ‡	Estonia	BePink–Imatra–Bongioanni	20	105	+ 2h 00' 36"	
33	Nora Jenčušová	Slovakia	BePink–Imatra–Bongioanni	23	100	+ 1h 52' 35"	
34	Linda Laporta	Italy	BePink–Imatra–Bongioanni	25	73	+ 1h 22' 31"	
35	Gaia Segato ‡	Italy	BePink–Imatra–Bongioanni	21	35	+ 42' 01"	
36	Meike Uiterwijk Winkel	Netherlands	BePink–Imatra–Bongioanni	25	DNF-6	–	
37	Elisa Valtulini ‡	Italy	BePink–Imatra–Bongioanni	20	41	+ 49' 23"	
41	Chiara Consonni	Italy	Canyon//SRAM Zondacrypto	26	86	+ 1h 37' 28"	
42	Tiffany Cromwell	Australia	Canyon//SRAM Zondacrypto	37	83	+ 1h 36' 23"	
43	Justyna Czapla ‡	Germany	Canyon//SRAM Zondacrypto	21	74	+ 1h 24' 16"	
44	Cecilie Uttrup Ludwig	Denmark	Canyon//SRAM Zondacrypto	29	17	+ 12' 05"	
45	Antonia Niedermaier ‡	Germany	Canyon//SRAM Zondacrypto	22	5	+ 3' 07"	
46	Soraya Paladin	Italy	Canyon//SRAM Zondacrypto	32	53	+ 1h 02' 41"	
47	Alice Towers	Great Britain	Canyon//SRAM Zondacrypto	22	66	+ 1h 17' 40"	
51	Franziska Brauße	Germany	Ceratizit Pro Cycling	26	DNF-6	–	
52	Sara Fiorin ‡	Italy	Ceratizit Pro Cycling	20	DNF-6	–	
53	Elena Hartmann	Switzerland	Ceratizit Pro Cycling	34	32	+ 38' 43"	
54	Marta Jaskulska	Poland	Ceratizit Pro Cycling	25	82	+ 1h 32' 50"	
55	Dilyxine Miermont	France	Ceratizit Pro Cycling	25	DNS-7	–	
56	Sarah Van Dam	Canada	Ceratizit Pro Cycling	23	21	+ 16' 54"	
57	Petra Zsankó	Hungary	Ceratizit Pro Cycling	24	DNF-4	–	
61	Nina Berton	Luxembourg	EF Education–Oatly	23	48	+ 57' 45"	
62	Kim Cadzow	New Zealand	EF Education–Oatly	23	97	+ 1h 49' 54"	
63	Veronica Ewers	United States	EF Education–Oatly	30	87	+ 1h 39' 04"	
64	Maya Kingma	Netherlands	EF Education–Oatly	29	DNS-3	–	
65	Mirre Knaven ‡	Netherlands	EF Education–Oatly	20	96	+ 1h 49' 20"	
66	Sarah Roy	Australia	EF Education–Oatly	39	63	+ 1h 15' 27"	
67	Babette van der Wolf ‡	Netherlands	EF Education–Oatly	21	88	+ 1h 40' 06"	
71	Juliette Labous	France	FDJ–Suez	26	29	+ 29' 00"	
72	Loes Adegeest	Netherlands	FDJ–Suez	28	DNF-7	–	
73	Léa Curinier	France	FDJ–Suez	24	23	+ 21' 49"	
74	Célia Gery ‡	France	FDJ–Suez	19	DNF-8	–	
75	Évita Muzic	France	FDJ–Suez	26	13	+ 8' 27"	
76	Eglantine Rayer ‡	France	FDJ–Suez	21	78	+ 1h 25' 12"	
77	Alessia Vigilia	Italy	FDJ–Suez	25	51	+ 1h 01' 05"	
81	Yara Kastelijn	Netherlands	Fenix–Deceuninck	27	12	+ 7' 13"	
82	Sara Casasola	Italy	Fenix–Deceuninck	25	15	+ 9' 25"	
83	Pauliena Rooijakkers	Netherlands	Fenix–Deceuninck	32	4	+ 2' 55"	
84	Carina Schrempf	Austria	Fenix–Deceuninck	30	101	+ 1h 54' 42"	
85	Christina Schweinberger	Austria	Fenix–Deceuninck	28	71	+ 1h 20' 51"	
86	Marthe Truyen	Belgium	Fenix–Deceuninck	25	93	+ 1h 45' 49"	
87	Aniek van Alphen	Netherlands	Fenix–Deceuninck	26	49	+ 58' 04"	
91	Ruth Edwards	United States	Human Powered Health	31	46	+ 54' 31"	
92	Iurani Blanco	Spain	Human Powered Health	27	99	+ 1h 52' 09"	
93	Giada Borghesi	Italy	Human Powered Health	22	84	+ 1h 37' 11"	
94	Carlotta Cipressi ‡	Italy	Human Powered Health	22	45	+ 52' 36"	
95	Barbara Malcotti	Italy	Human Powered Health	25	8	+ 4' 44"	
96	Katia Ragusa	Italy	Human Powered Health	28	91	+ 1h 42' 30"	
97	Silvia Zanardi	Italy	Human Powered Health	25	102	+ 1h 58' 29"	
101	Sofia Arici ‡	Italy	Isolmant–Premac–Vittoria	22	103	+ 1h 59' 29"	
102	Valeria Curnis	Italy	Isolmant–Premac–Vittoria	30	113	+ 2h 19' 00"	
103	Sara Pepoli ‡	Italy	Isolmant–Premac–Vittoria	20	121	+ 2h 26' 37"	
104	Federica Damiana Piergiovanni	Italy	Isolmant–Premac–Vittoria	23	72	+ 1h 22' 30"	
105	Emma Redaelli ‡	Italy	Isolmant–Premac–Vittoria	22	122	+ 2h 40' 10"	
106	Beatrice Rossato	Italy	Isolmant–Premac–Vittoria	28	39	+ 47' 33"	
107	Asia Zontone	Italy	Isolmant–Premac–Vittoria	23	111	+ 2h 13' 25"	
111	Ane Santesteban	Spain	Laboral Kutxa–Fundación Euskadi	34	42	+ 52' 06"	
112	Naia Amondarain	Spain	Laboral Kutxa–Fundación Euskadi	24	DNS-6	–	
113	Alice Maria Arzuffi	Italy	Laboral Kutxa–Fundación Euskadi	30	62	+ 1h 14' 28"	
114	Yuliia Biriukova	Ukraine	Laboral Kutxa–Fundación Euskadi	27	47	+ 56' 14"	
115	Arianna Fidanza	Italy	Laboral Kutxa–Fundación Euskadi	30	57	+ 1h 04' 48"	
116	Usoa Ostolaza	Spain	Laboral Kutxa–Fundación Euskadi	27	36	+ 46' 00"	
117	Laura Tomasi	Italy	Laboral Kutxa–Fundación Euskadi	26	DNF-7	–	
121	Lucinda Brand	Netherlands	Lidl–Trek	36	60	+ 1h 10' 52"	
122	Lauretta Hanson	Australia	Lidl–Trek	30	75	+ 1h 24' 26"	
123	Anna Henderson	Great Britain	Lidl–Trek	26	59	+ 1h 05' 06"	
124	Isabella Holmgren ‡	Canada	Lidl–Trek	20	7	+ 3' 54"	
125	Fleur Moors ‡	Belgium	Lidl–Trek	19	DNF-5	–	
126	Amanda Spratt	Australia	Lidl–Trek	37	19	+ 15' 11"	
127	Shirin van Anrooij	Netherlands	Lidl–Trek	23	11	+ 6' 47"	
131	Monica Trinca Colonel	Italy	Liv AlUla Jayco	26	DNF-8	–	
132	Caroline Andersson	Sweden	Liv AlUla Jayco	23	DNF-6	–	
133	Georgia Baker	Australia	Liv AlUla Jayco	30	DNF-6	–	
134	Amber Pate	Australia	Liv AlUla Jayco	30	56	+ 1h 03' 43"	
135	Silke Smulders	Netherlands	Liv AlUla Jayco	24	14	+ 9' 09"	
136	Josie Talbot	Australia	Liv AlUla Jayco	28	79	+ 1h 27' 11"	
137	Quinty Ton	Netherlands	Liv AlUla Jayco	26	69	+ 1h 18' 32"	
141	Liane Lippert	Germany	Movistar Team	27	30	+ 30' 01"	
142	Aude Biannic	France	Movistar Team	34	68	+ 1h 18' 15"	
143	Ana Vitória Magalhães	Brazil	Movistar Team	24	67	+ 1h 18' 00"	
144	Sara Martín	Spain	Movistar Team	26	65	+ 1h 17' 17"	
145	Mareille Meijering	Netherlands	Movistar Team	30	34	+ 41' 56"	
146	Paula Patiño	Colombia	Movistar Team	28	37	+ 46' 21"	
147	Marlen Reusser	Switzerland	Movistar Team	33	2	+ 18"	
151	Tamara Dronova		Roland Le Dévoluy	31	70	+ 1h 18' 40"	
152	Giulia Giuliani	Italy	Roland Le Dévoluy	23	85	+ 1h 37' 21"	
153	Mia Griffin	Ireland	Roland Le Dévoluy	26	DNS-7	–	
155	Vittoria Ruffilli	Italy	Roland Le Dévoluy	23	116	+ 2h 22' 58"	
156	Petra Stiasny	Switzerland	Roland Le Dévoluy	23	18	+ 12' 48"	
157	Giorgia Vettorello	Italy	Roland Le Dévoluy	25	94	+ 1h 46' 41"	
161	Maryna Altukhova	Ukraine	Team Mendelspeck E-Work	25	DNF-4	–	
162	Emma Bernardi ‡	Italy	Team Mendelspeck E-Work	21	DNF-3	–	
163	Michela De Grandis ‡	Italy	Team Mendelspeck E-Work	20	114	+ 2h 20' 35"	
164	Chantelle McCarthy ‡	Australia	Team Mendelspeck E-Work	21	DNF-2	–	
165	Katelyn Nicholson	Australia	Team Mendelspeck E-Work	25	DNF-4	–	
166	Prisca Savi	Italy	Team Mendelspeck E-Work	23	DNF-4	–	
167	Giulia Vallotto ‡	Italy	Team Mendelspeck E-Work	21	118	+ 2h 25' 18"	
171	Marta Cavalli	Italy	Team Picnic–PostNL	27	DNF-4	–	
172	Francesca Barale ‡	Italy	Team Picnic–PostNL	22	64	+ 1h 17' 00"	
173	Eleonora Ciabocco ‡	Italy	Team Picnic–PostNL	21	26	+ 26' 29"	
174	Pfeiffer Georgi	Great Britain	Team Picnic–PostNL	24	DNF-4	–	
175	Megan Jastrab	United States	Team Picnic–PostNL	23	52	+ 1h 02' 31"	
176	Josie Nelson	Great Britain	Team Picnic–PostNL	23	DNF-8	–	
177	Becky Storrie	Great Britain	Team Picnic–PostNL	26	90	+ 1h 42' 26"	
181	Lotte Kopecky	Belgium	Team SD Worx–Protime	29	DNS-6	–	
182	Elena Cecchini	Italy	Team SD Worx–Protime	33	DNF-8	–	
183	Barbara Guarischi	Italy	Team SD Worx–Protime	34	DNF-7	–	
184	Steffi Häberlin	Switzerland	Team SD Worx–Protime	27	40	+ 48' 06"	
185	Mikayla Harvey	New Zealand	Team SD Worx–Protime	26	33	+ 41' 45"	
186	Anna van der Breggen	Netherlands	Team SD Worx–Protime	35	6	+ 3' 32"	
187	Lorena Wiebes	Netherlands	Team SD Worx–Protime	26	61	+ 1h 12' 10"	
191	Marianne Vos	Netherlands	Visma–Lease a Bike	38	DNS-7	–	
192	Viktória Chladoňová ‡	Slovakia	Visma–Lease a Bike	18	16	+ 11' 03"	
193	Mijntje Geurts ‡	Netherlands	Visma–Lease a Bike	21	76	+ 1h 24' 51"	
194	Lieke Nooijen	Netherlands	Visma–Lease a Bike	23	25	+ 23' 57"	
195	Maud Oudeman ‡	Netherlands	Visma–Lease a Bike	21	44	+ 52' 31"	
196	Rosita Reijnhout ‡	Netherlands	Visma–Lease a Bike	21	20	+ 15' 46"	
197	Eva van Agt	Netherlands	Visma–Lease a Bike	28	58	+ 1h 04' 56"	
201	Virginia Bortoli ‡	Italy	Top Girls Fassa Bortolo	21	89	+ 1h 42' 21"	
202	Alice Bulegato ‡	Italy	Top Girls Fassa Bortolo	19	120	+ 2h 25' 28"	
203	Monica Castagna ‡	Italy	Top Girls Fassa Bortolo	22	54	+ 1h 02' 47"	
204	Sara Luccon ‡	Italy	Top Girls Fassa Bortolo	19	104	+ 1h 59' 33"	
205	Marta Pavesi ‡	Italy	Top Girls Fassa Bortolo	19	106	+ 2h 02' 55"	
206	Chiara Reghini ‡	Italy	Top Girls Fassa Bortolo	22	77	+ 1h 25' 02"	
207	Alessia Zambelli ‡	Italy	Top Girls Fassa Bortolo	19	119	+ 2h 25' 25"	
211	Katrine Aalerud	Norway	Uno-X Mobility	30	10	+ 5' 19"	
212	Anniina Ahtosalo ‡	Finland	Uno-X Mobility	21	110	+ 2h 13' 01"	
213	Solbjørk Minke Anderson ‡	Denmark	Uno-X Mobility	20	55	+ 1h 03' 12"	
214	Teuntje Beekhuis	Netherlands	Uno-X Mobility	29	95	+ 1h 47' 59"	
215	Kamilla Aasebø ‡	Norway	Uno-X Mobility	18	98	+ 1h 51' 09"	
216	Rebecca Koerner	Denmark	Uno-X Mobility	24	108	+ 2h 08' 55"	
217	Anouska Koster	Netherlands	Uno-X Mobility	31	38	+ 47' 31"	

=== By team ===
(United Arab Emirates) UAE Team ADQ (UAD)
No.	Rider	Pos.
1	Elisa Longo Borghini (ITA)	1
2	Alena Amialiusik	DNF-8
3	Brodie Chapman (AUS)	43
4	Eleonora Camilla Gasparrini (ITA)	50
5	Erica Magnaldi (ITA)	24
6	Greta Marturano (ITA)	DNF-2
7	Silvia Persico (ITA)	28

(Belgium) AG Insurance–Soudal (AGS)
No.	Rider	Pos.
11	Ashleigh Moolman (RSA)	27
12	Mireia Benito (ESP)	31
13	Lore De Schepper (BEL)	22
14	Sarah Gigante (AUS)	3
15	Alexandra Manly (AUS)	92
16	Gaia Masetti (ITA)	80
17	Urška Žigart (SLO)	9

(Italy) Aromitalia 3T Vaiano (VAI)
No.	Rider	Pos.
21	Irene Affolati (ITA)	DNF-7
22	Fanny Bonini (ITA)	112
23	Lucia Brillante Romeo (ITA)	109
24	Rasa Leleivytė (LTU)	107
25	Argiro Milaki (GRE)	117
26	Hanna Tserakh	DNF-3
27	Valentina Venerucci (SMR)	115

(Italy) BePink–Imatra–Bongioanni (BPK)
No.	Rider	Pos.
31	Andrea Casagranda (ITA)	81
32	Elisabeth Ebras (EST)	105
33	Nora Jenčušová (SVK)	100
34	Linda Laporta (ITA)	73
35	Gaia Segato (ITA)	35
36	Meike Uiterwijk Winkel (NED)	DNF-6
37	Elisa Valtulini (ITA)	41

(Germany) Canyon//SRAM Zondacrypto (CSZ)
No.	Rider	Pos.
41	Chiara Consonni (ITA)	86
42	Tiffany Cromwell (AUS)	83
43	Justyna Czapla (GER)	74
44	Cecilie Uttrup Ludwig (DEN)	17
45	Antonia Niedermaier (GER)	5
46	Soraya Paladin (ITA)	53
47	Alice Towers (GBR)	66

(Germany) Ceratizit Pro Cycling (CTC)
No.	Rider	Pos.
51	Franziska Brauße (GER)	DNF-6
52	Sara Fiorin (ITA)	DNF-6
53	Elena Hartmann (SUI)	32
54	Marta Jaskulska (POL)	82
55	Dilyxine Miermont (FRA)	DNS-7
56	Sarah Van Dam (CAN)	21
57	Petra Zsankó (HUN)	DNF-4

(United States) EF Education–Oatly (EFO)
No.	Rider	Pos.
61	Nina Berton (LUX)	48
62	Kim Cadzow (NZL)	97
63	Veronica Ewers (USA)	87
64	Maya Kingma (NED)	DNS-3
65	Mirre Knaven (NED)	96
66	Sarah Roy (AUS)	63
67	Babette van der Wolf (NED)	88

(France) FDJ–Suez (TFS)
No.	Rider	Pos.
71	Juliette Labous (FRA)	29
72	Loes Adegeest (NED)	DNF-7
73	Léa Curinier (FRA)	23
74	Célia Gery (FRA)	DNF-8
75	Évita Muzic (FRA)	13
76	Eglantine Rayer (FRA)	78
77	Alessia Vigilia (ITA)	51

(Belgium) Fenix–Deceuninck (FDC)
No.	Rider	Pos.
81	Yara Kastelijn (NED)	12
82	Sara Casasola (ITA)	15
83	Pauliena Rooijakkers (NED)	4
84	Carina Schrempf (AUT)	101
85	Christina Schweinberger (AUT)	71
86	Marthe Truyen (BEL)	93
87	Aniek van Alphen (NED)	49

(United States) Human Powered Health (HPH)
No.	Rider	Pos.
91	Ruth Edwards (USA)	46
92	Iurani Blanco (ESP)	99
93	Giada Borghesi (ITA)	84
94	Carlotta Cipressi (ITA)	45
95	Barbara Malcotti (ITA)	8
96	Katia Ragusa (ITA)	91
97	Silvia Zanardi (ITA)	102

(Italy) Isolmant–Premac–Vittoria (SBT)
No.	Rider	Pos.
101	Sofia Arici (ITA)	103
102	Valeria Curnis (ITA)	113
103	Sara Pepoli (ITA)	121
104	Federica Damiana Piergiovanni (ITA)	72
105	Emma Redaelli (ITA)	122
106	Beatrice Rossato (ITA)	39
107	Asia Zontone (ITA)	111

(Spain) Laboral Kutxa–Fundación Euskadi (LKF)
No.	Rider	Pos.
111	Ane Santesteban (ESP)	42
112	Naia Amondarain (ESP)	DNS-6
113	Alice Maria Arzuffi (ITA)	62
114	Yuliia Biriukova (UKR)	47
115	Arianna Fidanza (ITA)	57
116	Usoa Ostolaza (ESP)	36
117	Laura Tomasi (ITA)	DNF-7

(United States) Lidl–Trek (LTK)
No.	Rider	Pos.
121	Lucinda Brand (NED)	60
122	Lauretta Hanson (AUS)	75
123	Anna Henderson (GBR)	59
124	Isabella Holmgren (CAN)	7
125	Fleur Moors (BEL)	DNF-5
126	Amanda Spratt (AUS)	19
127	Shirin van Anrooij (NED)	11

(Australia) Liv AlUla Jayco (LIV)
No.	Rider	Pos.
131	Monica Trinca Colonel (ITA)	DNF-8
132	Caroline Andersson (SWE)	DNF-6
133	Georgia Baker (AUS)	DNF-6
134	Amber Pate (AUS)	56
135	Silke Smulders (NED)	14
136	Josie Talbot (AUS)	79
137	Quinty Ton (NED)	69

(Spain) Movistar Team (MOV)
No.	Rider	Pos.
141	Liane Lippert (GER)	30
142	Aude Biannic (FRA)	68
143	Ana Vitória Magalhães (BRA)	67
144	Sara Martín (ESP)	65
145	Mareille Meijering (NED)	34
146	Paula Patiño (COL)	37
147	Marlen Reusser (SUI)	2

(Switzerland) Roland Le Dévoluy (CGS)
No.	Rider	Pos.
151	Tamara Dronova	70
152	Giulia Giuliani (ITA)	85
153	Mia Griffin (IRL)	DNS-7
155	Vittoria Ruffilli (ITA)	116
156	Petra Stiasny (SUI)	18
157	Giorgia Vettorello (ITA)	94

(Italy) Team Mendelspeck E-Work (MDS)
No.	Rider	Pos.
161	Maryna Altukhova (UKR)	DNF-4
162	Emma Bernardi (ITA)	DNF-3
163	Michela De Grandis (ITA)	114
164	Chantelle McCarthy (AUS)	DNF-2
165	Katelyn Nicholson (AUS)	DNF-4
166	Prisca Savi (ITA)	DNF-4
167	Giulia Vallotto (ITA)	118

(Netherlands) Team Picnic–PostNL (TPP)
No.	Rider	Pos.
171	Marta Cavalli (ITA)	DNF-4
172	Francesca Barale (ITA)	64
173	Eleonora Ciabocco (ITA)	26
174	Pfeiffer Georgi (GBR)	DNF-4
175	Megan Jastrab (USA)	52
176	Josie Nelson (GBR)	DNF-8
177	Becky Storrie (GBR)	90

(Netherlands) Team SD Worx–Protime (SDW)
No.	Rider	Pos.
181	Lotte Kopecky (BEL)	DNS-6
182	Elena Cecchini (ITA)	DNF-8
183	Barbara Guarischi (ITA)	DNF-7
184	Steffi Häberlin (SUI)	40
185	Mikayla Harvey (NZL)	33
186	Anna van der Breggen (NED)	6
187	Lorena Wiebes (NED)	61

(Netherlands) Visma–Lease a Bike (TVL)
No.	Rider	Pos.
191	Marianne Vos (NED)	DNS-7
192	Viktória Chladoňová (SVK)	16
193	Mijntje Geurts (NED)	76
194	Lieke Nooijen (NED)	25
195	Maud Oudeman (NED)	44
196	Rosita Reijnhout (NED)	20
197	Eva van Agt (NED)	58

(Italy) Top Girls Fassa Bortolo (TOP)
No.	Rider	Pos.
201	Virginia Bortoli (ITA)	89
202	Alice Bulegato (ITA)	120
203	Monica Castagna (ITA)	54
204	Sara Luccon (ITA)	104
205	Marta Pavesi (ITA)	106
206	Chiara Reghini (ITA)	77
207	Alessia Zambelli (ITA)	119

(Norway) Uno-X Mobility (UXM)
No.	Rider	Pos.
211	Katrine Aalerud (NOR)	10
212	Anniina Ahtosalo (FIN)	110
213	Solbjørk Minke Anderson (DEN)	55
214	Teuntje Beekhuis (NED)	95
215	Kamilla Aasebø (NOR)	98
216	Rebecca Koerner (DEN)	108
217	Anouska Koster (NED)	38

=== By nationality ===
Country	No. of riders	Finished	Stage wins
Australia	12	9	2 (Sarah Gigante x2)
Austria	2	2	
Belgium	4	2	
Brazil	1	1	
Canada	2	2	
Colombia	1	1	
Denmark	3	3	
Estonia	1	1	
Finland	1	1	
France	7	5	
Germany	4	3	2 (Liane Lippert x2)
Great Britain	5	3	1 (Anna Henderson)
Greece	1	1	
Hungary	1	0	
Ireland	1	0	
Italy	53	43	
Lithuania	1	1	
Luxembourg	1	1	
Netherlands	23	19	2 (Lorena Wiebes x2)
New Zealand	2	2	
Norway	2	2	
Poland	1	1	
San Marino	1	1	
Slovakia	2	2	
Slovenia	1	1	
South Africa	1	1	
Spain	6	5	
Sweden	1	0	
Switzerland	4	4	1 (Marlen Reusser)
Ukraine	2	1	
United States	3	3	
	3	1	
Total	153	122	8
