= 2025 Giro d'Italia Women =

Italian cycling race

2025 UCI Women's World Tour, race 21 of 27
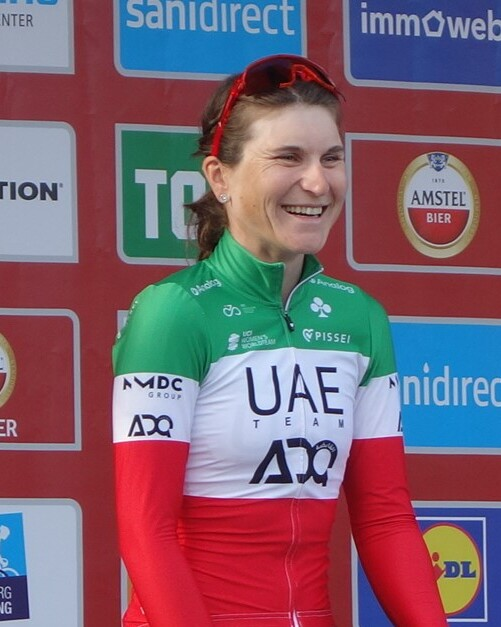
- Winner Elisa Longo Borghini, pictured earlier in 2025

Race details
- Dates: 6–13 July
- Stages: 8
- Distance: 919.2 km (571.2 mi)
- Winning time: 24h 37' 03"

Results
Jersey awarded to the overall winner	Winner	Elisa Longo Borghini (ITA)	(UAE Team ADQ)
	Second	Marlen Reusser (SUI)	(Movistar Team)
	Third	Sarah Gigante (AUS)	(AG Insurance–Soudal)
Jersey awarded to the points classification winner	Points	Lorena Wiebes (NED)	(Team SD Worx–Protime)
Jersey awarded to the mountains classification winner	Mountains	Sarah Gigante (AUS)	(AG Insurance–Soudal)
Jersey awarded to the young rider classification winner	Young rider	Antonia Niedermaier (GER)	(Canyon//SRAM Zondacrypto)
	Team	(Belgium) AG Insurance–Soudal	

The 2025 Giro d'Italia Women was the 36th edition of the Giro d'Italia Women, a women's road cycling stage race in Italy. The race took place from 6 to 13 July, and was the 21st event of the 2025 UCI Women's World Tour calendar. The race was organised by RCS Sport, which also organises the men's Giro d'Italia.

The race was won by Italian rider Elisa Longo Borghini of UAE Team ADQ for the second time, beating Swiss rider Marlen Reusser of Movistar Team by 18 seconds. Third overall was Australian rider Sarah Gigante of AG Insurance–Soudal, 1 minute 11 seconds behind Longo Borghini. Gigante won both mountain stages, taking the mountains classification.

Lorena Wiebes of Team SD Worx–Protime took the points classification, as well as winning stages 3 and 5. The youth classification was won by German rider Antonia Niedermaier of Canyon//SRAM Zondacrypto, with Niedermaier finishing 5th overall. The team classification was won by AG Insurance–Soudal.

== Teams ==
Twenty-two teams took part in the race. The teams were announced on 23 June 2025. All 15 UCI Women's WorldTeams were automatically invited. They were joined by two UCI Women's ProTeams and five UCI Women's Continental Teams.

UCI Women's WorldTeams

- AG Insurance–Soudal
- Canyon//SRAM Zondacrypto
- Ceratizit Pro Cycling
- FDJ–Suez
- Fenix–Deceuninck
- Human Powered Health
- Lidl–Trek
- Liv AlUla Jayco
- Movistar Team
- Roland Le Dévoluy
- Team Picnic–PostNL
- Team SD Worx–Protime
- UAE Team ADQ
- Uno-X Mobility
- Visma–Lease a Bike

UCI Women's Pro Teams

- EF Education–Oatly
- Laboral Kutxa–Fundación Euskadi

UCI Women's Continental Teams

- Aromitalia 3T Vaiano
- BePink–Imatra–Bongioanni
- Isolmant–Premac–Vittoria
- Team Mendelspeck E-Work
- Top Girls Fassa Bortolo

== Route ==
In January 2025, the route was announced by organisers RCS Sport. It comprised eight days of racing with eight stages, covering a total of 919.2 kilometres (571.2 mi). The race started in Bergamo, Lombardy in northern Italy with an individual time trial, before heading east through the Trentino-Alto Adige/Südtirol and Veneto regions, and then south towards Emilia-Romagna and Marche regions. The race passed through San Marino on stage 6. The final stage used the same hilly circuit used at the 2020 UCI Road World Championships, finishing at the Autodromo Internazionale Enzo e Dino Ferrari (a motor racing circuit).

The race featured three summit finishes, with the queen stage on stage 7 with a summit finish at Monte Nerone at an elevation of 1,395 metres (4,577 ft). As the highest climb of the race, the first rider to pass Passo del Tonale on stage 3 (1,883 metres (6,178 ft) in elevation) was awarded the "Cima Alfonsina Strada" – a prize named after Italian cyclist Alfonsina Strada, who took part in the men's Giro d’Italia in 1924. Despite rumours, the route did not feature the Mortirolo climb, last used in the 2016 edition of the race.

Reacting to the route, 2024 winner Elisa Longo Borghini stated that she "really [likes] the route; it suits my characteristics". The race remained at 8 stages in length, with the Tour de France Femmes becoming the longest event on the women's calendar with 9 stages. As with the previous editions, the route required a waiver from the Union Cycliste Internationale, as Women's WorldTour races have a maximum race length of six days.

Stage characteristics
Stage	Date	Course	Distance	Type	Winner
1	6 July	Bergamo	13.6 km (8.5 mi)	Individual time trial	Marlen Reusser (SUI)
2	7 July	Clusone to Aprica	99 km (62 mi)	Hilly stage	Anna Henderson (GBR)
3	8 July	Vezza d'Oglio to Trento	124 km (77 mi)	Hilly stage	Lorena Wiebes (NED)
4	9 July	Castello Tesino to Pianezze (Valdobbiadene)	156 km (97 mi)	Mountain stage	Sarah Gigante (AUS)
5	10 July	Mirano to Monselice	108 km (67 mi)	Flat stage	Lorena Wiebes (NED)
6	11 July	Bellaria to Igea Marina	144 km (89 mi)	Hilly stage	Liane Lippert (GER)
7	12 July	Fermignano to Monte Nerone	157 km (98 mi)	Mountain stage	Sarah Gigante (AUS)
8	13 July	Forlì to Imola (Autodromo Enzo and Dino Ferrari)	138 km (86 mi)	Hilly stage	Liane Lippert (GER)
Total			939.6 km (583.8 mi)		

== Pre-race favourites ==
Prior to the race, defending champion Elisa Longo Borghini (UAE Team ADQ), Marlen Reusser (Movistar Team), Juliette Labous (FDJ–Suez) and four-time winner Anna van der Breggen (Team SD Worx–Protime) were considered favourites for victory. Labous' teammate Demi Vollering did not enter the race, in light of the Tour de France Femmes later in July.

== Race summary ==
Reusser won the opening time trial in Bergamo by 12 seconds, putting her in the maglia rosa of the leaders jersey. On the second stage to Aprica, Anna Henderson (Lidl–Trek) and Dilyxine Miermont (Ceratizit Pro Cycling) escaped the peloton with around 40 km (25 mi) remaining in the stage. In the finish, Henderson outsprinted Miermont to take the stage win. Henderson took the overall race lead, 15 seconds ahead of Reusser. Henderson also took the red jersey of the points classification. Stage 3 to Trento was won in a sprint finish by Lorena Wiebes (Team SD Worx–Protime), with several contenders for the sprint delayed by crashes behind.

Stage 4 to Pianezze (Valdobbiadene) was the first mountain stage of the race, with Sarah Gigante (AG Insurance–Soudal) winning the stage after attacking with 1.5 km (0.93 mi) remaining to the summit finish. Her stage victory allowed her to take the lead in the mountains classification. Finishing together 25 seconds behind Gigante were Reusser and Longo Borghini, with other contenders for the overall victory losing time overall. Reusser retook the overall lead, with a 16 seconds lead ahead of Longo Borghini. Henderson lost over 10 minutes on the stage, but did maintain her lead in the points classification.

Stage 5 to Monselice was won by Wiebes in a sprint finish, however splits behind meant that many contenders lost time to Reusser, with Gigante dropping to 5th overall. Reusser was given a yellow card for "intimidating" Katia Ragusa on the stage – a second yellow card would result in expulsion from the event. Lotte Kopecky (Team SD Worx–Protime) abandoned the race prior to stage 6 with back pain, wishing to recover prior to the start of the Tour de France Femmes.

Stage 6 was a hilly stage to Igea Marina – Liane Lippert (Movistar Team) and Pauliena Rooijakkers (Fenix–Deceuninck) escaped the peloton with 10 km (6.2 mi) remaining, with Lippert outsprinting Rooijakkers to win the stage. Shirin van Anrooij (Lidl–Trek) finished third on the stage, 46 seconds behind. Reusser finished in the peloton and maintained her overall lead over Longo Borghini and van der Breggen, with Rooijakkers moving into fourth overall.

Stage 7 was the second mountain stage of the race, with a summit finish at Monte Nerone at an elevation of 1,525 m (5,003 ft). At the bottom of the climb, Longo Borghini attacked, aiming to take the overall lead from Reusser. On the climb, Gigante caught up with Longo Borghini before soloing to the finish with 2 km (1.2 mi) remaining to win the stage by 45 seconds ahead of Longo Borghini. Reusser was nearly a minute 20 seconds behind Gigante, therefore losing the lead to Longo Borghini. Gigante's performance was praised in the media, with Cycling Weekly stating that she "proves herself one of the world best climbers".

The final stage of the race used a hilly finishing circuit around in Imola. Longo Borghini had to maintain her 22-second lead over Reusser to win the maglia rosa. In the closing part of the stage, Lippert and van der Breggen attacked, with Lippert outsprinting her rival to take her second stage win of the race. Reusser took third on the stage, gaining a four-second time bonus – however this was not enough to deny Longo Borghini the overall victory.

=== Result ===
The race was won by Longo Borghini for the second time, beating Reusser by 18 seconds. Longo Borghini did not win a stage during the race. Following her victory, Longo Borghini stated that the race had been "intense, emotional, unforgettable" and that "I knew I had to dig deep and fight until the very end.” Reusser stated that she'd been sick for the last three days, and that she was "super happy that I could somehow save this second place".

Third overall was Gigante, who also took the mountains classification. Rooijakkers was 4th overall, with Antonia Niedermaier (Canyon//SRAM Zondacrypto) 5th overall to win the youth classification. Wiebes took the points classification, and the team classification was won by AG Insurance–Soudal.

== Classification leadership table ==
Classification leadership by stage
Stage	Winner	General classification	Points classification	Mountains classification	Young rider classification	Team classification
1	Marlen Reusser	Marlen Reusser	Marlen Reusser (Note: On stage two, Lotte Kopecky, who was second in the points classification, wore the red jersey, because first placed Marlen Reusser wore the pink jersey as the leader of the general classification.)	not awarded	Antonia Niedermaier	Team SD Worx–Protime
2	Anna Henderson	Anna Henderson	Anna Henderson (Note: On stage three, Dilyxine Miermont, who was second in the points classification, wore the red jersey, because first placed Anna Henderson wore the pink jersey as the leader of the general classification. For the same reason Lorena Wiebes wore the red jersey in stage 4.)	Anna Henderson (Note: On stage three, Soraya Paladin, who was third in the mountains classification, wore the blue jersey, because first placed Anna Henderson wore the pink jersey as the leader of the general classification and second placed Dilyxine Miermont wore the red jersey.)	Antonia Niedermaier	Lidl–Trek
3	Lorena Wiebes	Anna Henderson	Anna Henderson	Usoa Ostolaza	Antonia Niedermaier	Lidl–Trek
4	Sarah Gigante	Marlen Reusser	Anna Henderson	Sarah Gigante	Antonia Niedermaier	AG Insurance–Soudal
5	Lorena Wiebes	Marlen Reusser	Lorena Wiebes	Sarah Gigante	Antonia Niedermaier	AG Insurance–Soudal
6	Liane Lippert	Marlen Reusser	Lorena Wiebes	Sarah Gigante	Antonia Niedermaier	AG Insurance–Soudal
7	Sarah Gigante	Elisa Longo Borghini	Lorena Wiebes	Usoa Ostolaza	Antonia Niedermaier	AG Insurance–Soudal
8	Liane Lippert	Elisa Longo Borghini	Lorena Wiebes	Sarah Gigante	Antonia Niedermaier	AG Insurance–Soudal
Final		Elisa Longo Borghini	Lorena Wiebes	Sarah Gigante	Antonia Niedermaier	AG Insurance–Soudal

== Classification standings ==
Legend
Denotes the winner of the general classification	Denotes the winner of the mountains classification
Denotes the winner of the points classification	Denotes the winner of the young rider classification

=== General classification ===
Final general classification (1–10)
Rank	Rider	Team	Time
1	Elisa Longo Borghini (ITA)	UAE Team ADQ	24h 37' 03"
2	Marlen Reusser (SUI)	Movistar Team	+ 18"
3	Sarah Gigante (AUS)	AG Insurance–Soudal	+ 1' 11"
4	Pauliena Rooijakkers (NED)	Fenix–Deceuninck	+ 2' 55"
5	Antonia Niedermaier (GER)	Canyon//SRAM Zondacrypto	+ 3' 07"
6	Anna van der Breggen (NED)	Team SD Worx–Protime	+ 3' 32"
7	Isabella Holmgren (CAN)	Lidl–Trek	+ 3' 54"
8	Barbara Malcotti (ITA)	Human Powered Health	+ 4' 44"
9	Urška Žigart (SLO)	AG Insurance–Soudal	+ 4' 56"
10	Katrine Aalerud (NOR)	Uno-X Mobility	+ 5' 19"

=== Points classification ===
Final points classification (1–10)
Rank	Rider	Team	Points
1	Lorena Wiebes (NED)	Team SD Worx–Protime	108
2	Elisa Longo Borghini (ITA)	UAE Team ADQ	78
3	Marlen Reusser (SUI)	Movistar Team	75
4	Liane Lippert (GER)	Movistar Team	68
5	Anna Henderson (GBR)	Lidl–Trek	59
6	Anna van der Breggen (NED)	Team SD Worx–Protime	38
7	Sarah Gigante (AUS)	AG Insurance–Soudal	31
8	Pauliena Rooijakkers (NED)	Fenix–Deceuninck	23
9	Eleonora Camilla Gasparrini (ITA)	UAE Team ADQ	20
10	Isabella Holmgren (CAN)	Lidl–Trek	18

=== Mountains classification ===
Final mountains classification (1–10)
Rank	Rider	Team	Time
1	Sarah Gigante (AUS)	AG Insurance–Soudal	81
2	Usoa Ostolaza (ESP)	Laboral Kutxa–Fundación Euskadi	73
3	Léa Curinier (FRA)	FDJ–Suez	30
4	Mijntje Geurts (NED)	Visma–Lease a Bike	26
5	Elisa Longo Borghini (ITA)	UAE Team ADQ	26
6	Shirin van Anrooij (NED)	Lidl–Trek	21
7	Sara Casasola (ITA)	Fenix–Deceuninck	17
8	Lorena Wiebes (NED)	Team SD Worx–Protime	14
9	Évita Muzic (FRA)	FDJ–Suez	14
10	Marlen Reusser (SUI)	Movistar Team	12

=== Young rider classification ===
Final young rider classification (1–10)
Rank	Rider	Team	Time
1	Antonia Niedermaier (GER)	Canyon//SRAM Zondacrypto	24h 40' 10"
2	Isabella Holmgren (CAN)	Lidl–Trek	+ 47"
3	Viktória Chladoňová (SVK)	Visma–Lease a Bike	+ 7' 56"
4	Rosita Reijnhout (NED)	Visma–Lease a Bike	+ 12' 39"
5	Lore De Schepper (BEL)	AG Insurance–Soudal	+ 16' 06"
6	Eleonora Ciabocco (ITA)	Team Picnic–PostNL	+ 23' 22"
7	Gaia Segato (ITA)	BePink–Imatra–Bongioanni	+ 38' 54"
8	Elisa Valtulini (ITA)	BePink–Imatra–Bongioanni	+ 46' 16"
9	Maud Oudeman (NED)	Visma–Lease a Bike	+ 49' 24"
10	Carlotta Cipressi (ITA)	Human Powered Health	+ 49' 29"

=== Team classification ===
Final team classification (1–10)
Rank	Team	Time
1	(Belgium) AG Insurance–Soudal	74h 04' 12"
2	(Belgium) Fenix–Deceuninck	+ 5' 42"
3	(United States) Lidl–Trek	+ 11' 25"
4	(United Arab Emirates) UAE Team ADQ	+ 29' 48"
5	(Netherlands) Visma–Lease a Bike	+ 34' 50"
6	(France) FDJ–Suez	+ 42' 38"
7	(Germany) Canyon//SRAM Zondacrypto	+ 58' 40"
8	(Spain) Movistar Team	+ 59' 04"
9	(Netherlands) Team SD Worx–Protime	+ 1h 06' 43"
10	(United States) Human Powered Health	+ 1h 27' 48"
