= Giuseppe Toaldo =

Catholic priest and physicist (1719–1797)

Giuseppe Toaldo FRS
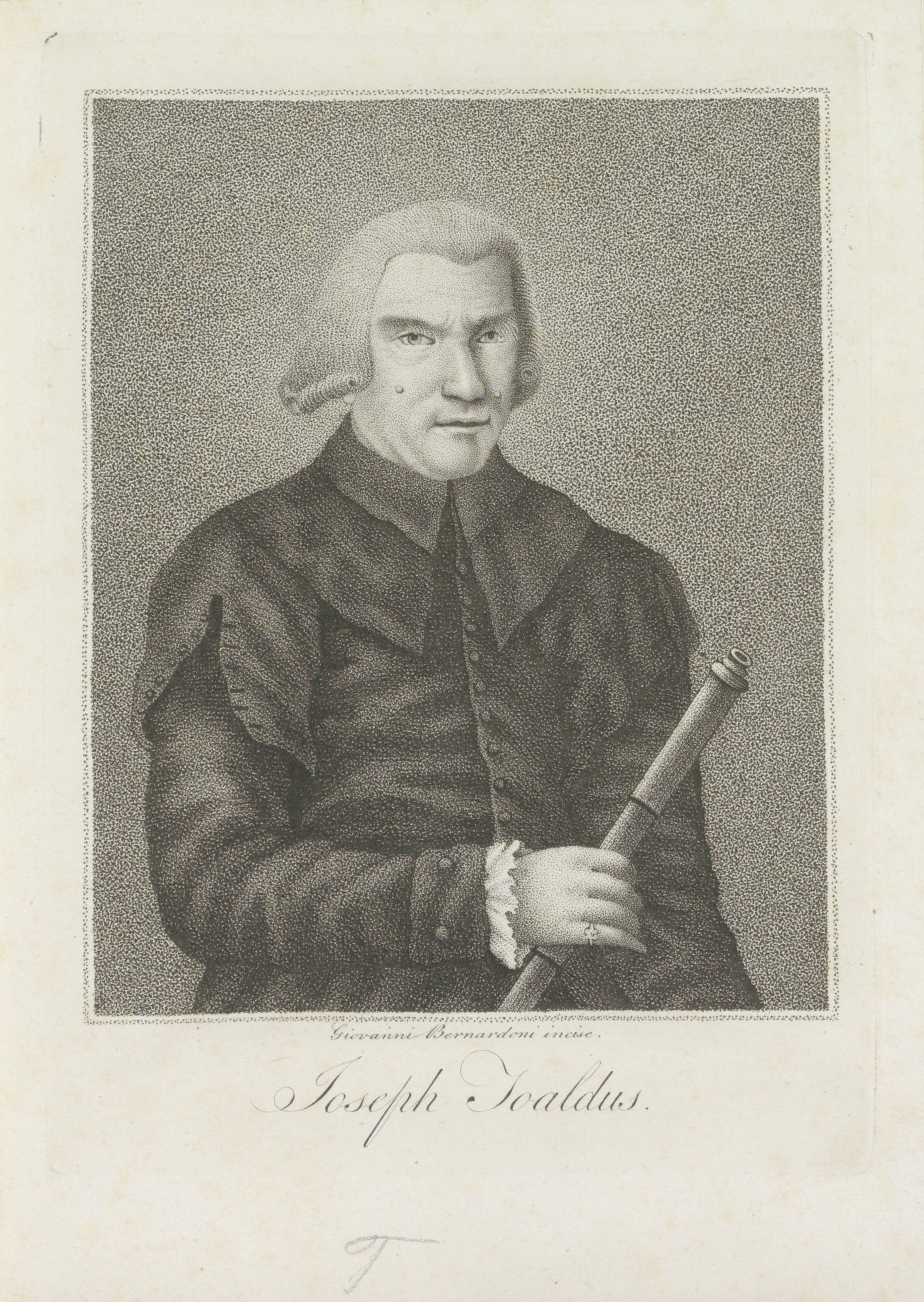
- Portrait of Giuseppe Toaldo
- Born: 11 July 1719; Pianezze, Italy
- Died: 11 November 1797 (aged 78); Padua, Italy
- Scientific career
- Fields: Astronomy
- Workplaces: University of Padua; Astronomical Observatory of Padua

Giuseppe Toaldo or Joseph Toaldo FRS (Pianezze, 11 November 1719 – Padua, 11 July 1797) was an Italian Catholic priest and physicist. He took an interest in astro-meteorology and served as the chair of astronomy at Padua from 1764.

== Biography ==
Giuseppe Toaldo was born on 11 November 1719, in Pianezza. At age fourteen, he entered the seminary of Padua, and spent much of his life in the Serenissima in which he subsequently taught mathematics and Italian literature. While connected with the seminary he edited the works of Galileo (1744), for which he wrote an appreciative preface and critical notes. In this edition, for the first time since Galileo Galilei's condemnation, it was published with ecclesiastical approval the Dialogue Concerning the Two Chief World Systems.

In 1754, he was appointed pastor of Montegalda; and, eight years later, was called to the chair of astronomy in the University of Padua. Toaldo, like his contemporaries, Divisch and Giovanni Battista Beccaria (both priests), gave special attention to the study of atmospheric electricity and to the means of protecting buildings against lightning. He advocated the erection of lightning rods, adopting the views of Benjamin Franklin on their preventive and protective action, rather than those of the French school led by Abbé Nollet. His treatise "Della maniera di difendere gli edificii dal fulmine" (1772) and his pamphlet "Dei conduttori metallici a preservazione degli edifici dal fulmine" (1774) contributed largely to remove the popular prejudices of the time against the use of the "Franklinian rod"; and through his exertions lightning-conductors were placed on Siena Cathedral, on the tower of St. Mark's, Venice, on powder magazines, and ships of the Venetian navy.

Toaldo became especially famous in Europe for his weather prediction theories. He noticed that after 9 years, and then 18 years, meteorological phenomena returned in the same order. This cyclical conception of weather is also shared by Louis Cotte, who argued for the existence of a cycle — known as the Metonic cycle — of approximately 19 years. Cotte suggested that his meteorological cycle was more applicable to northern Europe, whereas Toaldo’s cycles were more effective in southern Europe, although this hypothesis was not really taken up elsewhere in Europe.

He also organised a meteorological network in the Republic of Venice. His call for collaboration circulated above all through his almanac: the Giornale astro-meteorologico, which appeared for the first time in 1773 and continued long after his death. He was able to bring together more than thirty observers, including a noblewoman from Sacile, Angela Borgo.

Toaldo was a member of many of the learned bodies of Europe, notably of the Royal Society, London. The asteroid 23685 Toaldo is named for him.

== Works ==
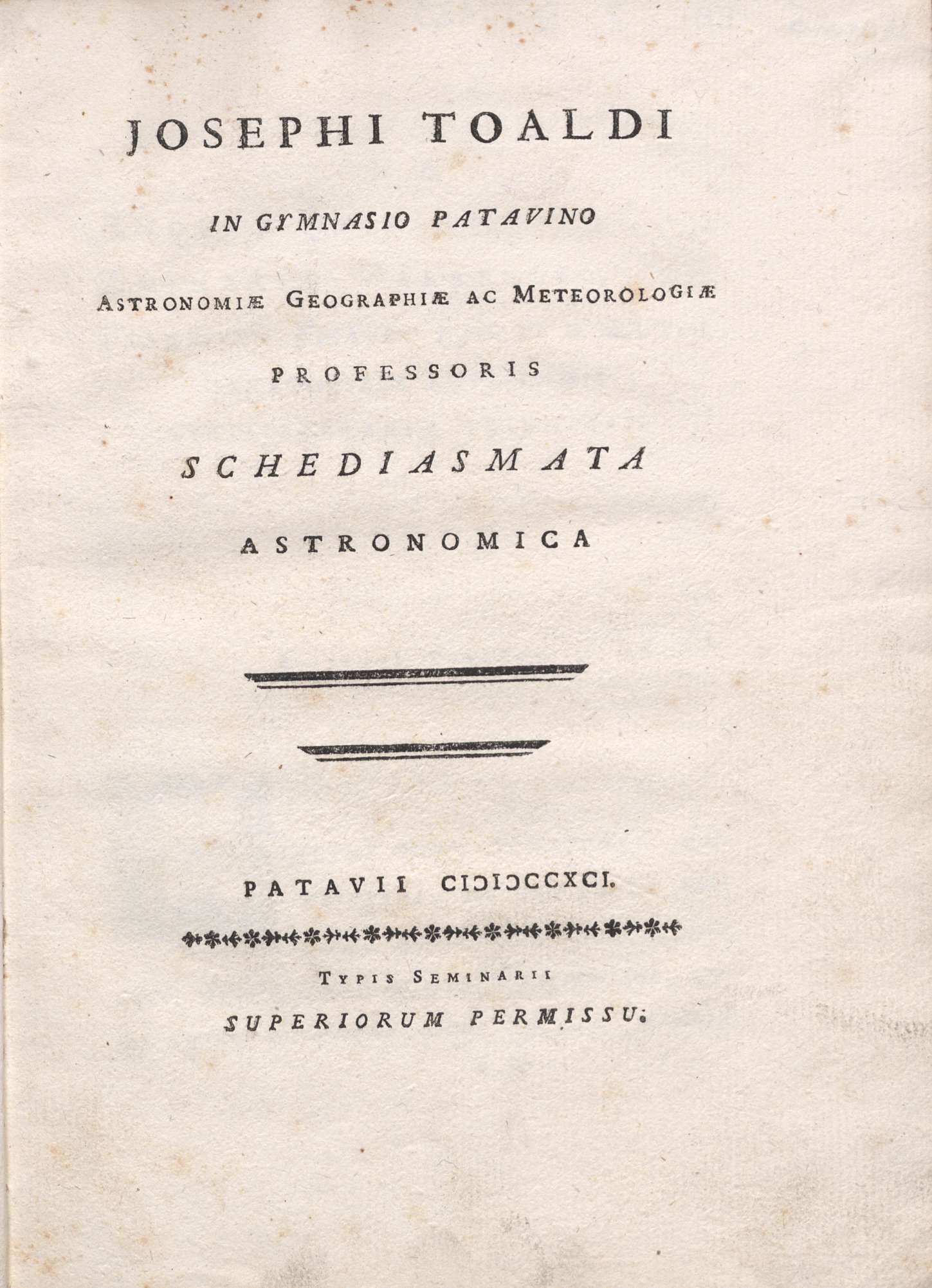
Schediasmata astronomica, 1791

- Della maniera di preservare gli edifici dal fulmine (in Italian). Venezia. 1772.
- Novae tabulae barometri aestusque maris (in Latin). Padova: Tipografia del Seminario. 1773.
- Del conduttore elettrico posto nel campanile di S. Marco in Venezia (in Italian). Venezia: Giovanni Antonio Pinelli, figli. 1776.
- Saggi di studi veneti (in Italian). Venezia: Gasparo Storti (2.). 1782.
- Tavole di vitalità (in Italian). Padova: Giovanni Antonio Conzatti. 1787.

== See also ==
- List of Roman Catholic cleric–scientists
