= 2021 Challenge by La Vuelta =

2021 Ceratizit Challenge by La Vuelta
2021 UCI Women's World Tour, race 15 of 18

Race details
- Dates: 2–5 September 2021
- Stages: 4
- Distance: 341.3 km (212.1 mi)
- Winning time: 8h 40' 18"

Results
Jersey awarded to the overall winner	Winner	Annemiek van Vleuten (NED)	(Movistar Team)
	Second	Marlen Reusser (SUI)	(Alé BTC Ljubljana)
	Third	Elise Chabbey (SUI)	(Canyon//SRAM)
Jersey awarded to the points classification winner	Points	Lotte Kopecky (BEL)	(Liv Racing)
	Team	Canyon//SRAM	

The 2021 Ceratizit Challenge by La Vuelta was a women's road cycling stage race that was held in the region of Galicia in northwestern Spain from 2 to 5 September 2021. It was the seventh edition of the Challenge by La Vuelta and was the fifteenth event on the 2021 UCI Women's World Tour calendar. As with previous editions, the final day of the race coincided with the final day of the Vuelta a España.

== Teams ==
All nine UCI Women's WorldTeams and fifteen UCI Women's Continental Teams made up the twenty-four teams that participated in the race. Several teams did not enter a full squad of six riders: Alé BTC Ljubljana, Eneicat–RBH Global–Martín Villa, FDJ Nouvelle-Aquitaine Futuroscope, InstaFund Racing, and Team BikeExchange each entered five riders, while Ceratizit–WNT Pro Cycling only entered four. In total, 137 riders started the race, of which 111 finished.

UCI Women's WorldTeams

- Alé BTC Ljubljana
- Canyon//SRAM
- FDJ Nouvelle-Aquitaine Futuroscope
- Liv Racing
- Movistar Team
- SD Worx
- Team BikeExchange
- Team DSM
- Trek–Segafredo

UCI Women's Continental Teams

- Bepink
- Bizkaia–Durango
- Burgos Alimenta Women Cycling Sport
- Ceratizit–WNT Pro Cycling
- Eneicat–RBH Global–Martín Villa
- InstaFund Racing
- Laboral Kutxa–Fundación Euskadi
- Massi–Tactic
- Río Miera–Cantabria Deporte
- Sopela Women's Team
- Team Coop–Hitec Products
- Team Farto–BTC
- Team Jumbo–Visma
- Tibco–Silicon Valley Bank
- Valcar–Travel & Service

== Route ==
The 2021 edition increased the number of stages to 4, with the race finishing in Santiago de Compostela. As usual, the final stage took place in conjunction with the final stage of the 2021 Vuelta a España.

Stage characteristics and winners
Stage	Date	Course	Distance	Type	Winner
1	2 September	Estación de Montaña de Manzaneda to A Rúa	118.7 km (73.8 mi)	Hilly stage	Marlen Reusser (SUI)
2	3 September	Estación de Montaña de Manzaneda	7.3 km (4.5 mi)	Mountain time trial	Annemiek van Vleuten (NED)
3	4 September	Estación de Montaña de Manzaneda to O Pereiro de Aguiar	107.9 km (67.0 mi)	Hilly stage	Annemiek van Vleuten (NED)
4	5 September	As Pontes to Santiago de Compostela	107.4 km (66.7 mi)	Flat stage	Lotte Kopecky (BEL)
Total		341.3 km (212.1 mi)			

== Stages ==
=== Stage 1 ===
2 September 2021 — Estación de Montaña de Manzaneda to A Rúa, 118.7 km (73.8 mi)

Stage 1 Result
Rank	Rider	Team	Time
1	Marlen Reusser (SUI)	Alé BTC Ljubljana	3h 07' 46"
2	Coryn Rivera (USA)	Team DSM	+ 22"
3	Elise Chabbey (SUI)	Canyon//SRAM	+ 22"
4	Pauliena Rooijakkers (NED)	Liv Racing	+ 22"
5	Elisa Balsamo (ITA)	Valcar–Travel & Service	+ 1' 48"
6	Anna Henderson (GBR)	Team Jumbo–Visma	+ 1' 48"
7	Lotte Kopecky (BEL)	Liv Racing	+ 1' 48"
8	Alison Jackson (CAN)	Liv Racing	+ 1' 48"
9	Marie Le Net (FRA)	FDJ Nouvelle-Aquitaine Futuroscope	+ 1' 48"
10	Floortje Mackaij (NED)	Team DSM	+ 1' 48"

General classification after Stage 1
Rank	Rider	Team	Time
1	Marlen Reusser (SUI)	Alé BTC Ljubljana	3h 07' 36"
2	Coryn Rivera (USA)	Team DSM	+ 26"
3	Elise Chabbey (SUI)	Canyon//SRAM	+ 28"
4	Pauliena Rooijakkers (NED)	Liv Racing	+ 32"
5	Elisa Balsamo (ITA)	Valcar–Travel & Service	+ 1' 58"
6	Anna Henderson (GBR)	Team Jumbo–Visma	+ 1' 58"
7	Lotte Kopecky (BEL)	Liv Racing	+ 1' 58"
8	Alison Jackson (CAN)	Liv Racing	+ 1' 58"
9	Marie Le Net (FRA)	FDJ Nouvelle-Aquitaine Futuroscope	+ 1' 58"
10	Floortje Mackaij (NED)	Team DSM	+ 1' 58"

=== Stage 2 ===
3 September 2021 — Estación de Montaña de Manzaneda, 7.3 km (4.5 mi) (ITT)

Stage 2 Result
Rank	Rider	Team	Time
1	Annemiek van Vleuten (NED)	Movistar Team	19' 08"
2	Marlen Reusser (SUI)	Alé BTC Ljubljana	+ 20"
3	Marta Cavalli (ITA)	FDJ Nouvelle-Aquitaine Futuroscope	+ 28"
4	Kristen Faulkner (USA)	Tibco–Silicon Valley Bank	+ 48"
5	Leah Thomas (USA)	Movistar Team	+ 59"
6	Juliette Labous (FRA)	Team DSM	+ 1' 00"
7	Liane Lippert (GER)	Team DSM	+ 1' 15"
8	Katarzyna Niewiadoma (POL)	Canyon//SRAM	+ 1' 20"
9	Urška Žigart (SLO)	Team BikeExchange	+ 1' 23"
10	Pauliena Rooijakkers (NED)	Liv Racing	+ 1' 24"

General classification after Stage 2
Rank	Rider	Team	Time
1	Marlen Reusser (SUI)	Alé BTC Ljubljana	3h 27' 03"
2	Pauliena Rooijakkers (NED)	Liv Racing	+ 1' 36"
3	Annemiek van Vleuten (NED)	Movistar Team	+ 1' 39"
4	Coryn Rivera (USA)	Team DSM	+ 1' 45"
5	Elise Chabbey (SUI)	Canyon//SRAM	+ 1' 48"
6	Marta Cavalli (ITA)	FDJ Nouvelle-Aquitaine Futuroscope	+ 2' 06"
7	Kristen Faulkner (USA)	Tibco–Silicon Valley Bank	+ 2' 26"
8	Leah Thomas (USA)	Movistar Team	+ 2' 37"
9	Juliette Labous (FRA)	Team DSM	+ 2' 38"
10	Liane Lippert (GER)	Team DSM	+ 2' 54"

=== Stage 3 ===
4 September 2021 — Estación de Montaña de Manzaneda to O Pereiro de Aguiar, 107.9 km (67.0 mi)

Stage 3 Result
Rank	Rider	Team	Time
1	Annemiek van Vleuten (NED)	Movistar Team	2h 41' 53"
2	Liane Lippert (GER)	Team DSM	+ 2' 48"
3	Katarzyna Niewiadoma (POL)	Canyon//SRAM	+ 2' 48"
4	Elisa Longo Borghini (ITA)	Trek–Segafredo	+ 2' 51"
5	Floortje Mackaij (NED)	Team DSM	+ 2' 55"
6	Kata Blanka Vas (HUN)	SD Worx	+ 3' 01"
7	Elise Chabbey (SUI)	Canyon//SRAM	+ 3' 01"
8	Marta Cavalli (ITA)	FDJ Nouvelle-Aquitaine Futuroscope	+ 3' 01"
9	Marlen Reusser (SUI)	Alé BTC Ljubljana	+ 3' 03"
10	Elisa Balsamo (ITA)	Valcar–Travel & Service	+ 7' 13"

General classification after Stage 3
Rank	Rider	Team	Time
1	Annemiek van Vleuten (NED)	Movistar Team	6h 10' 25"
2	Marlen Reusser (SUI)	Alé BTC Ljubljana	+ 1' 34"
3	Elise Chabbey (SUI)	Canyon//SRAM	+ 3' 20"
4	Marta Cavalli (ITA)	FDJ Nouvelle-Aquitaine Futuroscope	+ 3' 38"
5	Liane Lippert (GER)	Team DSM	+ 4' 07"
6	Katarzyna Niewiadoma (POL)	Canyon//SRAM	+ 4' 14"
7	Elisa Longo Borghini (ITA)	Trek–Segafredo	+ 4' 35"
8	Floortje Mackaij (NED)	Team DSM	+ 4' 46"
9	Kata Blanka Vas (HUN)	SD Worx	+ 5' 07"
10	Pauliena Rooijakkers (NED)	Liv Racing	+ 7' 30"

=== Stage 4 ===
5 September 2021 — As Pontes to Santiago de Compostela, 107.4 km (66.7 mi)

Stage 4 Result
Rank	Rider	Team	Time
1	Lotte Kopecky (BEL)	Liv Racing	2h 29' 37"
2	Elisa Longo Borghini (ITA)	Trek–Segafredo	+ 0"
3	Anna Henderson (GBR)	Team Jumbo–Visma	+ 4"
4	Kata Blanka Vas (HUN)	SD Worx	+ 6"
5	Silvia Zanardi (ITA)	Valcar–Travel & Service	+ 6"
6	Elisa Balsamo (ITA)	Valcar–Travel & Service	+ 6"
7	Katarzyna Niewiadoma (POL)	Canyon//SRAM	+ 6"
8	Liane Lippert (GER)	Team DSM	+ 8"
9	Floortje Mackaij (NED)	Team DSM	+ 8"
10	Riejanne Markus (NED)	Team Jumbo–Visma	+ 8"

General classification after Stage 4
Rank	Rider	Team	Time
1	Annemiek van Vleuten (NED)	Movistar Team	8h 40' 18"
2	Marlen Reusser (SUI)	Alé BTC Ljubljana	+ 1' 34"
3	Elise Chabbey (SUI)	Canyon//SRAM	+ 3' 12"
4	Marta Cavalli (ITA)	FDJ Nouvelle-Aquitaine Futuroscope	+ 3' 30"
5	Liane Lippert (GER)	Team DSM	+ 3' 59"
6	Katarzyna Niewiadoma (POL)	Canyon//SRAM	+ 4' 04"
7	Elisa Longo Borghini (ITA)	Trek–Segafredo	+ 4' 13"
8	Floortje Mackaij (NED)	Team DSM	+ 4' 38"
9	Kata Blanka Vas (HUN)	SD Worx	+ 4' 57"
10	Pauliena Rooijakkers (NED)	Liv Racing	+ 7' 58"

== Classification leadership table ==
Stage	Winner	General classification	Points classification	Team classification
1	Marlen Reusser	Marlen Reusser	Marlen Reusser	Alé BTC Ljubljana
2	Annemiek van Vleuten	Marlen Reusser	Marlen Reusser	Alé BTC Ljubljana
3	Annemiek van Vleuten	Annemiek van Vleuten	Marlen Reusser	Canyon//SRAM
4	Lotte Kopecky	Annemiek van Vleuten	Lotte Kopecky	Canyon//SRAM
Final		Annemiek van Vleuten	Lotte Kopecky	Canyon//SRAM

- On stages 2 and 3, Coryn Rivera, who was second in the points classification, wore the green jersey, because first-placed Marlen Reusser wore the red jersey as the leader of the general classification.

== Current classification standings ==
Legend
Denotes the leader of the general classification	Denotes the leader of the points classification

=== General classification ===
Final general classification (1–10)
Rank	Rider	Team	Time
1	Annemiek van Vleuten (NED)	Movistar Team	8h 40' 18"
2	Marlen Reusser (SUI)	Alé BTC Ljubljana	+ 1' 34"
3	Elise Chabbey (SUI)	Canyon//SRAM	+ 3' 12"
4	Marta Cavalli (ITA)	FDJ Nouvelle-Aquitaine Futuroscope	+ 3' 30"
5	Liane Lippert (GER)	Team DSM	+ 3' 59"
6	Katarzyna Niewiadoma (POL)	Canyon//SRAM	+ 4' 04"
7	Elisa Longo Borghini (ITA)	Trek–Segafredo	+ 4' 13"
8	Floortje Mackaij (NED)	Team DSM	+ 4' 38"
9	Kata Blanka Vas (HUN)	SD Worx	+ 4' 57"
10	Pauliena Rooijakkers (NED)	Liv Racing	+ 7' 58"

=== Points classification ===
Final points classification (1–10)
Rank	Rider	Team	Points
1	Lotte Kopecky (BEL)	Liv Racing	38
2	Elisa Longo Borghini (ITA)	Trek–Segafredo	34
3	Marlen Reusser (SUI)	Alé BTC Ljubljana	32
4	Anna Henderson (GBR)	Team Jumbo–Visma	31
5	Elise Chabbey (SUI)	Canyon//SRAM	29
6	Liane Lippert (GER)	Team DSM	28
7	Elisa Balsamo (ITA)	Valcar–Travel & Service	28
8	Annemiek van Vleuten (NED)	Movistar Team	25
9	Katarzyna Niewiadoma (POL)	Canyon//SRAM	25
10	Floortje Mackaij (NED)	Team DSM	25

=== Team classification ===
Final team classification (1–10)
Rank	Team	Time
1	(Germany) Canyon//SRAM	26h 17' 33"
2	(Spain) Movistar Team	+ 1' 43"
3	(Italy) Alé BTC Ljubljana	+ 3' 33"
4	(United States) Trek–Segafredo	+ 5' 57"
5	(Netherlands) SD Worx	+ 6' 36"
6	(France) FDJ Nouvelle-Aquitaine Futuroscope	+ 6' 37"
7	(Netherlands) Liv Racing	+ 10' 38"
8	(Netherlands) Team Jumbo–Visma	+ 11' 23"
9	(Australia) Team BikeExchange	+ 11' 54"
10	(Italy) Valcar–Travel & Service	+ 13' 23"

== See also ==
- 2021 in women's road cycling
