= 2023 European Road Championships – Women's road race =

Women's elite road race
2023 European Road Championships

Race details
- Dates: 23 September 2023
- Stages: 1
- Distance: 129.6 km (80.5 mi)
- Winning time: 3:04.12

Medalists
	Gold	Mischa Bredewold (NED)
	Silver	Lorena Wiebes (NED)
	Bronze	Lotte Kopecky (BEL)

The women's elite road race at the 2023 European Road Championships took place on 23 September 2023, in Drenthe, the Netherlands.

== Results ==
Rank	#	Cyclist	Nation	Time	Diff.
1st place, gold medalist(s)	2	Mischa Bredewold	Netherlands	3:04.12	
2nd place, silver medalist(s)	8	Lorena Wiebes	Netherlands	3:04.16	+00:04
3rd place, bronze medalist(s)	21	Lotte Kopecky	Belgium	s.t.	
4	31	Pfeiffer Georgi	Great Britain	3:04.20	+00:08
5	14	Silvia Persico	Italy	s.t.	
6	25	Elise Chabbey	Switzerland	s.t.	
7	55	Liane Lippert	Germany	s.t.	
8	32	Anna Henderson	Great Britain	s.t.	
9	39	Juliette Labous	France	3:04.23	+00:11
10	7	Demi Vollering	Netherlands	3:04.25	+00:13
11	47	Katarzyna Niewiadoma	Poland	3:04.27	+00:15
12	62	Cecilie Ludwig	Denmark	3:04.33	+00:21
13	28	Marlen Reusser	Switzerland	3:04.43	+00:31
14	86	Emilia Fahlin	Sweden	3:04.47	+00:35
15	35	Victoire Berteau	France	3:04.49	+00:37
16	72	Susanne Andersen	Norway	3:04.51	+00:39
17	6	Shirin van Anrooij	Netherlands	s.t.	
18	33	Claire Steels	Great Britain	s.t.	
19	20	Mieke Docx	Belgium	3:04.53	+00:41
20	5	Riejanne Markus	Netherlands	s.t.	
21	80	Christine Majerus	Luxembourg	3:04.56	+00:44
22	74	Eugenia Bujak	Slovenia	3:04.57	+00:45
23	58	Emma Norsgaard	Denmark	3:05.08	+00:56
24	11	Elena Cecchini	Italy	3:05.26	+01:14
25	38	Maëlle Grossetête	France	3:05.29	+01:17
26	42	Jade Wiel	France	s.t.	
27	40	Marie Le Net	France	s.t.	
28	85	Tereza Neumanová	Czech Republic	3:06.06	+01:54
29	77	Olha Kulynych	Ukraine	3:06.07	+01:55
30	79	Yuliia Biriukova	Ukraine	s.t.	
31	54	Franziska Koch	Germany	3:06.10	+01:58
32	92	Rasa Leleivytė	Lithuania	3:06:11	+01:59
33	24	Caroline Baur	Switzerland	3:06:13	+02:01
34	73	Marte Berg Edseth	Norway	3:06:15	+02:03
35	23	Marthe Truyen	Belgium	s.t.	
36	17	Fauve Bastiaenssen	Belgium	s.t.	
37	19	Valerie Demey	Belgium	s.t.	
38	22	Marieke Meert	Belgium	s.t.	
39	34	Becky Storrie	Great Britain	3:06:18	+02:06
40	67	Alicia González Blanco	Spain	s.t.	
41	18	Audrey De Keersmaeker	Belgium	3:06.20	+02:08
42	78	Valeriya Kononenko	Ukraine	s.t.	
43	91	Rotem Gafinovitz	Israel	s.t.	
44	69	Sara Martín	Spain	s.t.	
45	87	Hanna Nilsson	Sweden	3:06.25	+02:13
46	52	Romy Kasper	Germany	3:06:29	+02:17
47	4	Floortje Mackaij	Netherlands	s.t.	
48	27	Nicole Koller	Switzerland	3:06:31	+02:19
49	3	Yara Kastelijn	Netherlands	3:06.39	+02:27
50	64	Christina Schweinberger	Austria	3:06:42	+02:30
51	44	Marta Jaskulska	Poland	3:07:01	+02:49
52	88	Jelena Erić	Serbia	s.t.	
53	94	Alice Sharpe	Ireland	3:07.06	+02:54
54	29	Elinor Barker	Great Britain	3:07.18	+03:06
55	10	Sofia Bertizzolo	Italy	3:07.31	+03:19
56	95	Anastasia Carbonari	Latvia	3:07.35	+03:23
57	57	Lea Lin Teutenberg	Germany	3:07.50	+03:38
58	12	Barbara Guarischi	Italy	3:12.48	+08:36
59	46	Marta Lach	Poland	s.t.	
60	9	Elisa Balsamo	Italy	s.t.	
61	48	Daria Pikulik	Poland	s.t.	
62	16	Silvia Zanardi	Italy	s.t.	
63	51	Katharina Fox	Germany	s.t.	
64	36	Aude Biannic	France	s.t.	
65	71	Alba Teruel Ribes	Spain	s.t.	
66	37	Audrey Cordon-Ragot	France	s.t.	
67	26	Lea Fuchs	Switzerland	3:13.04	+08:52
68	83	Nikola Bajgerová	Czech Republic	s.t.	
69	56	Hannah Ludwig	Germany	s.t.	
70	93	Fiona Mangan	Ireland	3:13.08	+08:56
71	89	Maria Martins	Portugal	3:13.52	+09:40
DNF	1	Loes Adegeest	Netherlands		
DNF	13	Soraya Paladin	Italy		
DNF	15	Ilaria Sanguineti	Italy		
DNF	30	Alice Barnes	Great Britain		
DNF	41	Gladys Verhulst	France		
DNF	43	Monika Brzeźna	Poland		
DNF	45	Karolina Kumięga	Poland		
DNF	49	Katarzyna Wilkos	Poland		
DNF	53	Lisa Klein	Germany		
DNF	59	Amalie Dideriksen	Denmark		
DNF	60	Ellen Klinge	Denmark		
DNF	63	Carina Schrempf	Switzerland		
DNF	65	Sandra Alonso	Spain		
DNF	66	Mireia Benito	Spain		
DNF	68	Isabel Martín	Spain		
DNF	70	Usoa Ostolaza	Spain		
DNF	75	Špela Kern	Slovenia		
DNF	76	Maryna Altukhova	Ukraine		
DNF	81	Antonia Gröndahl	Finland		
DNF	82	Laura Vainionpää	Finland		
DNF	84	Jarmila Machačová	Czech Republic		
DNF	90	Zsófia Szabó	Hungary		
DNF	96	Hafdís Sigurðardóttir	Iceland		
DNF	97	Kristin Edda Sveinsdóttir	Iceland		
DNS	61	Rebecca Koerner	Denmark		
