= Cycling at the 2024 Summer Olympics – Women's road time trial =

Women's road time trial at the Games of the XXXIII Olympiad
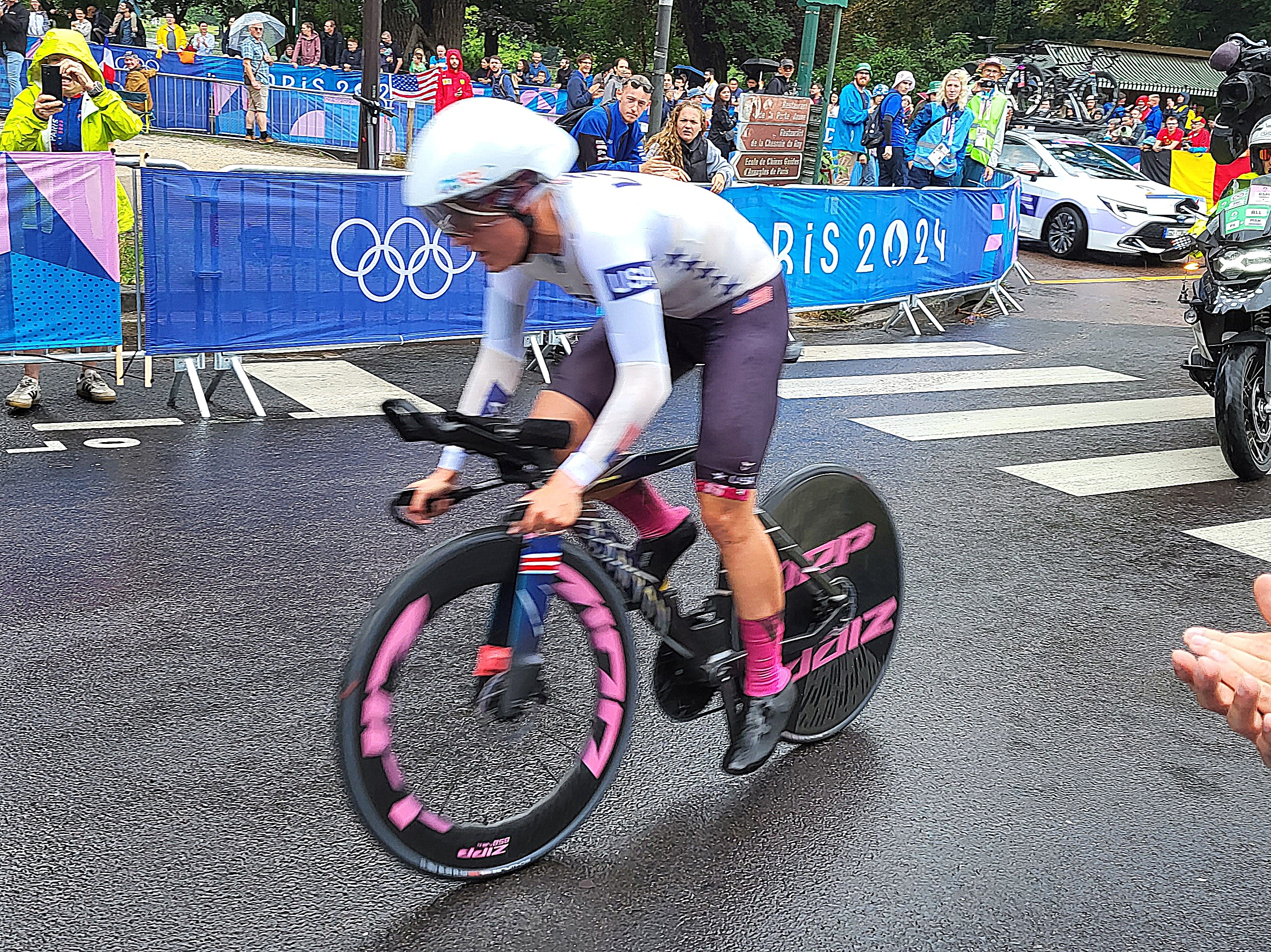
- Bronze medallist Chloé Dygert during the race
- Venues: Pont d'Iéna
- Date: 27 July 2024
- Competitors: 35 from 26 nations
- Winning time: 39:38.24

Medalists
1st place, gold medalist(s)		Grace Brown	Australia
2nd place, silver medalist(s)		Anna Henderson	Great Britain
3rd place, bronze medalist(s)		Chloé Dygert	United States

The women's road time trial event at the 2024 Summer Olympics took place on 27 July 2024 on a course starting at 14:30 at Pont d'Iéna in Paris.

Grace Brown, who started the second last, won the race. Anna Henderson won silver, and Chloé Dygert bronze, despite having fallen. For Brown and Henderson these were the first Olympic medals; Dygert has two medals in team pursuit from 2016 and 2020 Olympics, but never medaled before in road cycling. There were numerous falls as the race was completed in very wet conditions. Taylor Knibb of the United States fell from her bike four times.

== Background ==
This was the 7th appearance of the event, held at every Summer Olympics since 1996.

== Competition format and course ==
The road time trial was a one-day road race event. The course began at Les Invalides and terminates at the Pont Alexandre III taking in the Bastille in its route. The course is broadly flat, and lasts for 32.4 kilometres.

== Race overview ==
The reigning Olympic champion Annemiek van Vleuten retired between the two Games. All three medalists from the most recent World championships were entered, including world champion Chloé Dygert, the last rider starting.

== Results ==
Rank	Bib No.	Start Time	Rider	Nation	Time	Diff.
1st place, gold medalist(s)	2	15:19:30	Grace Brown	Australia	39:38.24	
2nd place, silver medalist(s)	4	15:16:30	Anna Henderson	Great Britain	41:09.83	+1:31.59
3rd place, bronze medalist(s)	1	15:21:00	Chloé Dygert	United States	41:10.70	+1:32.46
4	6	15:13:30	Juliette Labous	France	41:19.90	+1:41.66
5	5	15:15:00	Demi Vollering	Netherlands	41:29.80	+1:51.56
6	9	15:09:00	Lotte Kopecky	Belgium	41:34.82	+1:56.58
7	21	14:51:00	Kim Cadzow	New Zealand	41:46.02	+2:07.78
8	8	15:10:30	Elisa Longo Borghini	Italy	41:49.32	+2:11.08
9	17	14:57:00	Audrey Cordon-Ragot	France	41:51.67	+2:13.43
10	3	15:18:00	Christina Schweinberger	Austria	41:52.02	+2:13.78
11	15	15:00:00	Ellen van Dijk	Netherlands	42:21.76	+2:43.52
12	10	15:07:30	Agnieszka Skalniak-Sójka	Poland	42:24.62	+2:46.38
13	22	14:49:30	Mieke Kröger	Germany	42:28.12	+2:49.88
14	16	14:58:30	Emma Norsgaard	Denmark	42:33.59	+2:55.35
15	13	15:03:00	Antonia Niedermaier	Germany	42:53.79	+3:15.55
16	26	14:43:30	Eugenia Bujak	Slovenia	42:54.96	+3:16.72
17	14	15:01:30	Elena Hartmann	Switzerland	42:58.90	+3:20.66
18	29	14:39:00	Marta Lach	Poland	43:03.43	+3:25.19
19	28	14:40:30	Taylor Knibb	United States	43:03.46	+3:25.22
20	25	14:45:00	Olivia Baril	Canada	43:03.58	+3:25.34
21	23	14:48:00	Tamara Dronova	Individual Neutral Athletes	43:42.16	+4:03.92
22	19	14:54:00	Mireia Benito	Spain	43:48.10	+4:09.86
23	12	15:04:30	Olga Zabelinskaya	Uzbekistan	43:53.51	+4:15.27
24	31	14:36:00	Cecilie Uttrup Ludwig	Denmark	44:10.93	+4:32.69
25	7	15:12:00	Nora Jenčušová	Slovakia	44:22.30	+4:44.06
26	33	14:33:00	Yulduz Hashimi	Afghanistan	44:29.13	+4:50.89
27	27	14:42:00	Yuliia Biriukova	Ukraine	44:43.73	+5:05.49
28	30	14:37:30	Julia Kopecký	Czech Republic	44:53.75	+5:15.51
29	32	14:34:30	Hanna Tserakh	Individual Neutral Athletes	44:57.20	+5:18.96
30	20	14:52:30	Anniina Ahtosalo	Finland	45:05.18	+5:26.94
31	35	14:30:00	Urša Pintar	Slovenia	45:07.15	+5:28.91
32	34	14:31:30	Tang Xin	China	45:59.44	+6:21.20
33	11	15:06:00	Anna Kiesenhofer	Austria	46:28.88	+6:50.64
34	18	14:55:30	Phetdarin Somrat	Thailand	47:25.11	+7:46.87
35	24	14:46:30	Diane Ingabire	Rwanda	48:05.24	+8:27.00
