= Sarah Gigante =

Australian cyclist (born 2000)

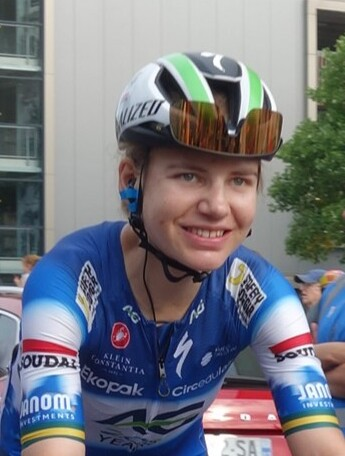
- Gigante in 2024

Personal information
- Full name: Sarah Gigante
- Born: 6 October 2000 (age 26) Melbourne, Victoria, Australia

Cycling career
- Sport: Cycling
- Current team: AG Insurance–Soudal
- Discipline: Road
- Role: Rider

Amateur teams
- 2018: Holden Team Gusto
- 2019: Roxsolt Attaquer

Professional teams
- 2020–2021: Tibco–Silicon Valley Bank
- 2022–2023: Movistar Team
- 2024-: AG Insurance–Soudal

Major wins
- Major Tours Giro d'Italia Mountains classification (2025) 2 individual stages (2025) One day races & Classics National Road Race Championships (2019) National Time Trial Championships (2020, 2021)
Medal record
Women's Cycling Esports
Representing Australia
World Championships
Silver medal – second place	2020 Watopia	Women's Race

Sarah Gigante (born 6 October 2000) is an Australian racing cyclist, who currently rides for UCI Women's WorldTeam AG Insurance–Soudal.

== Career ==
=== Junior and under-23 career ===
In 2018, Gigante was national junior champion in the road race, individual time trial and criterium, won the junior women's road race at the 2018 Oceania Cycling Championships, won the silver medal in the Junior World Track Championships points race,

In 2019, aged 18, Gigante won the elite women's race at the Australian National Road Race Championships. She was awarded the 2019 Amy Gillett Foundation Scholarship to support her development as a professional cyclist.

=== Tibco–Silicon Valley Bank (2020–2021) ===
In December 2019, it was announced that Gigante would turn professional with the Tibco–Silicon Valley Bank team. In January 2020, she won the Australian National Time Trial Championships. She won the overall at the Australian National Road Series. She re-signed with Tibco-SVB for the 2021 season.

Gigante finished second in the inaugural UCI Cycling Esports World Championships.

She had a strong start to the 2021 season in Australia winning the general classification and two stages at the Santos Festival of Cycling. She then defended her national title in the individual time trial.

Gigante was selected to compete in the road race and time trial at the Tokyo Olympics. She finished 40th in the road race and 11th in the time trial.

=== Movistar (2022-2023) ===
Gigante had her first win in Europe at the Emakumeen Nafarroako Klasikoa in May 2022.

=== AG Insurance–Soudal (2024-2026) ===
Through mutual agreement with Movistar, she left the team to join AG Insurance–Soudal without serving the third year of her contract. Gigante won the 2024 Women's Tour Down Under, her first Women's WorldTour victory.

In 2025, Gigante won the two mountain stages at the Giro d'Italia Women, taking the mountains classification and finishing 3rd overall. Her performance at the Giro was praised in the media, with Cycling Weekly stating that she "proves herself one of the world best climbers".

Gigante rose to second position of the general classification of the Tour de France Femmes after finishing second in the mountain top finish of Stage 8. She slipped to sixth on the general classification during Stage 9 after losing contact with the lead group.

Gigante broke her femur in a training accident in mid-August 2025 and underwent surgery. This meant an early end to the season and she would be unable to compete in the World Road Cycling Championships. Her return to racing was further delayed after she required surgery in June 2026 to remove the metal pin from her femur.

Gigante returned to racing for the 2026 season at the Faun Tour Femmes in September. She also signed a one year contract extension with AG Insurance-Soudal. Gigante was selected in the Australian team for the 2026 World Road Cycling Championships in Montreal.

== Personal ==
In 2018, Gigante achieved a perfect high school Australian Tertiary Admission Rank (ATAR) score of 99.95, earning her the prestigious University of Melbourne Chancellor's Scholarship. She has completed a double degree in linguistics and geography.

== Major results ==
2017
2nd Road race, Oceania Junior Road Championships
National Junior Road Championships

2nd Road race
3rd Criterium

2018
1st Road race, Oceania Junior Road Championships
National Junior Road Championships

1st Road race
1st Time trial
1st Criterium

National Junior Track Championships

1st Team pursuit
1st Points race
1st Madison

2nd Points race, UCI Junior Track World Championships
2019
Oceania Road Championships

1st Under-23 road race
1st Under-23 time trial
2nd Road race

National Road Championships

1st Road race
1st Under-23 road race
1st Under-23 time trial

1st Overall Spirit of Tasmania Cycling Tour

1st Stage 1

2020
National Road Championships

1st Time trial
2nd Under-23 road race

1st Overall National Road Series
2nd UCI Esports World Championships
5th Overall Herald Sun Tour
2021
1st Time trial, National Road Championships
1st Overall Santos Festival of Cycling

1st Mountains classification
1st Young rider classification
1st Stages 2 & 3

2022
1st Emakumeen Nafarroako Klasikoa
2024
1st Overall Tour Down Under

1st Stage 3

7th Overall Tour de France
2025
3rd Overall Giro Donne

1st Mountains classification
1st Stage 4 & 7

6th Overall Tour de France
