= Monte Nerone =

Mountain in Italy

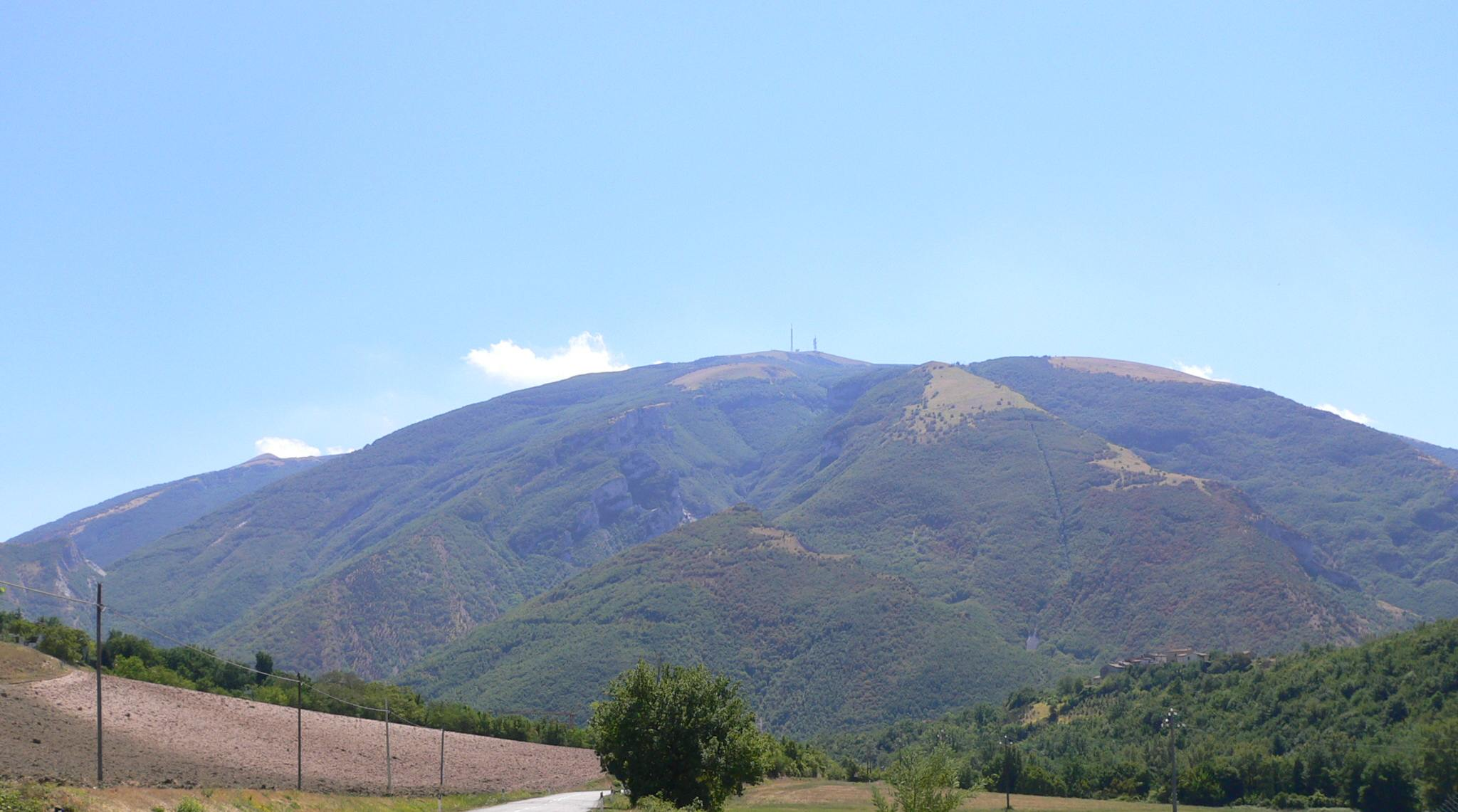
- The mount seen from Piobbico

Highest point
- Elevation: 1,525 m (5,003 ft)
- Prominence: 823 m (2,700 ft)
- Isolation: 15.86 km (9.85 mi)
- Coordinates: 43°33′30″N 12°31′00″E

Geography
- Location within Italy
- Location: Marche, Italy
- Parent range: Central Apennines

The Monte Nerone is a mountain in the Umbrian Apennines, in the province of Pesaro e Urbino, Marche, central Italy. The highest peak is at 1,525 m above sea level.

The Monte Nerone is a limestone massif, including several aspects of Karst topography. The core of the mountain is formed by an oncoidal limestone reef covered by successive pelagic carbonate deposits including ammonite beds. The mountains in this area have been caught up in a long period of compressional tectonics, causing folding and distinct high topographic ridges.

Origins of the name are unclear; it has been suggested it could stem from that of the Roman consul Gaius Claudius Nero, who, in the battle of the Metaurus against the Carthaginians led by Hasdrubal, pursued the Gauls up to the mountain's peak.
