= Liane Lippert =

German cyclist (born 1998)

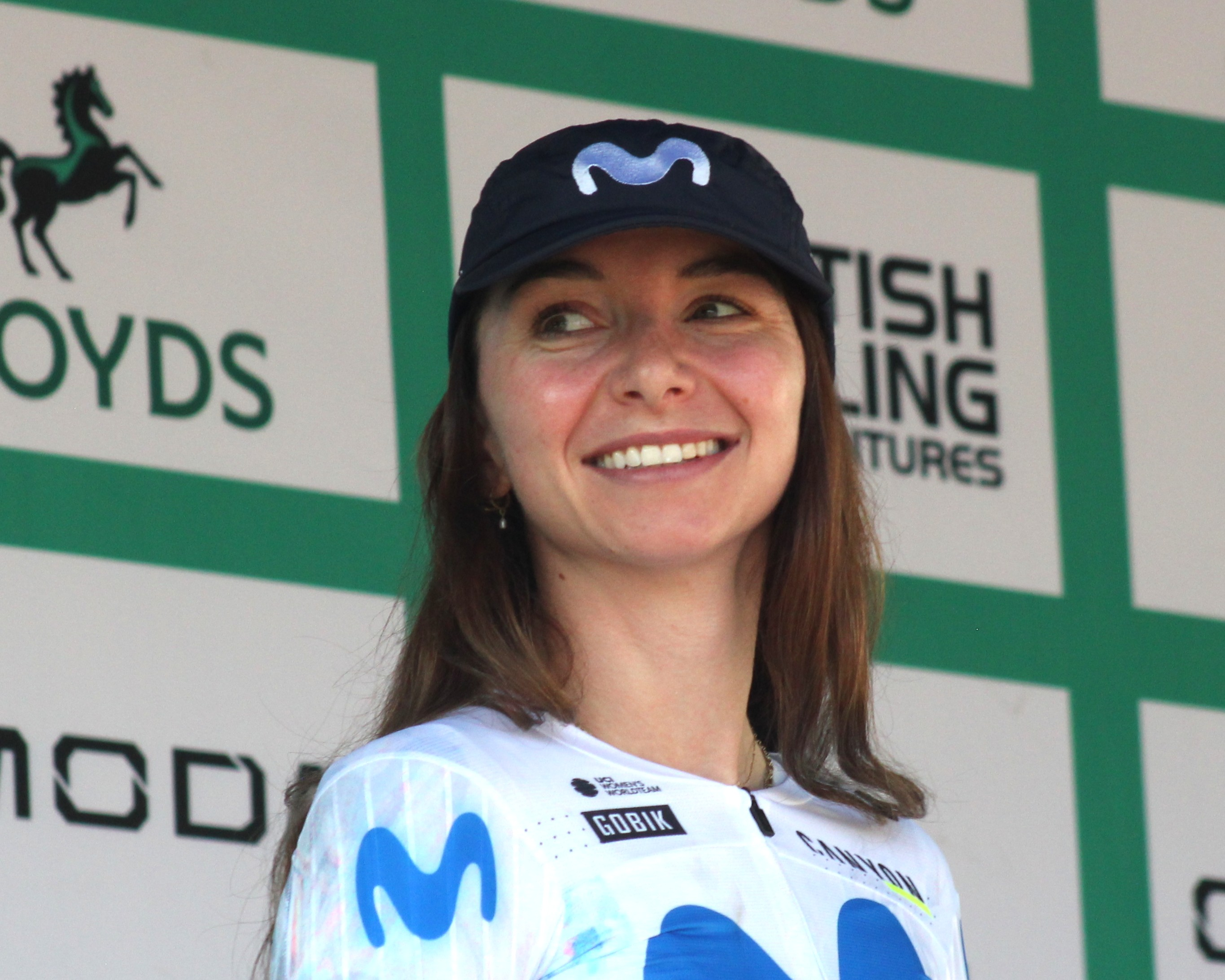
- Lippert in 2026

Personal information
- Full name: Liane Lippert
- Born: 13 January 1998 (age 28) Friedrichshafen, Germany
- Height: 1.68 m (5 ft 6 in)
- Weight: 56 kg (123 lb)

Cycling career
- Sport: Cycling
- Current team: Movistar Team
- Discipline: Road
- Role: Rider

Amateur teams
- 2010–2016: RSV Seerose Friedrichshafen
- 2015–2016: Mangetseder–WRSV

Professional teams
- 2017–2022: Team Sunweb
- 2023–: Movistar Team

Major wins
- Major Tours Tour de France 1 individual stage (2023) Giro Donne 3 individual stages (2024, 2025) One-day races and Classics National Road Race Championships (2018, 2022, 2023) Great Ocean Road Race (2020)
Medal record
Women's road bicycle racing
Representing Germany
World Championships
Silver medal – second place	2024 Zurich	Mixed team relay

Liane Lippert (born 13 January 1998) is a German cyclist, who currently rides for UCI Women's WorldTeam Movistar Team.

== Career ==
Born in Friedrichshafen, Lippert started her career in local club RSV Seerose Friedrichshafen in 2008. In the following years she won the U15 mountain category at Germany's former greatest mountain time track Lightweight Uphill. Since 2013 Lippert was nominated in the German squad until she got her first professional contract. She won the European junior road championship in 2016.

Lippert joined Team Sunweb in 2017 and achieved her first victory at UCI Women's World Tour level in the 2020 Cadel Evans Great Ocean Road Race.

== Major results ==
2016
1st Road race, UEC European Junior Road Championships
6th Overall Trophée d'Or Féminin
2017
9th Overall Lotto Belgium Tour
2018
1st Road race, National Road Championships
1st Overall Lotto Belgium Tour
4th Overall Tour de Yorkshire
6th Overall Thüringen Tour

1st Young rider classification

2019
9th Dwars door Vlaanderen
2020
1st Cadel Evans Great Ocean Road Race
2nd Overall Tour Down Under

1st Mountains classification
1st Youth classification

2nd Brabantse Pijl
2021
2nd Road race, UEC European Road Championships
4th Overall Thüringen Tour
5th Overall Challenge by La Vuelta
8th La Course by Le Tour de France
2022
1st Road race, National Road Championships
3rd Amstel Gold Race
3rd Brabantse Pijl
4th Overall Tour de Romandie

1st Young rider classification

4th Road race, UCI Road World Championships
7th La Flèche Wallonne
8th Liège–Bastogne–Liège
2023
1st Road race, National Road Championships
1st Tre Valli Varesine
1st Stage 2 Tour de France
1st Stage 3 Tour de Romandie
2nd La Flèche Wallonne
4th Overall Tour of Scandinavia
6th Giro dell'Emilia
7th Road race, UEC European Road Championships
7th Strade Bianche
8th Dwars door Vlaanderen
2024
1st Stage 6 Giro d'Italia
UCI Road World Championships

2nd Team relay
4th Road race

2nd Road race, National Road Championships
3rd Classic Lorient Agglomération
3rd Tre Valli Varesine
8th Overall Vuelta a Burgos
2025
1st Stage 6 Giro d'Italia
3rd Tour of Flanders
5th Overall Setmana Ciclista Valenciana
6th Dwars door Vlaanderen
2026
1st Overall Vuelta a la Comunitat Valenciana Feminas
2nd Road race, National Road Championships
3rd Overall Tour of Britain
