= Babette van der Wolf =

Dutch cyclist (born 2004)

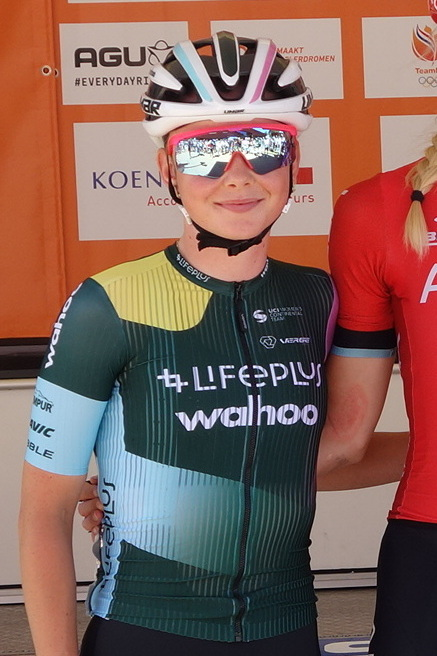
- van der Wolf in 2023

Personal information
- Born: 29 April 2004 (age 22) Rotterdam, Netherlands

Cycling career
- Sport: Cycling
- Current team: EF Education–Oatly
- Disciplines: Road; Track
- Role: Rider

Amateur team
- 2021–2022: WV Schijndel

Professional teams
- 2023–2024: Lifeplus Wahoo
- 2025–: EF Education–Oatly

Babette van der Wolf (born 29 April 2004) is a Dutch cyclist, who currently rides for UCI Women's WorldTeam EF Education–Oatly. Van der Wolf is the younger sister of former racing cyclist Rosalie van der Wolf and daughter of former cyclist Michael van der Wolf.

== Major results ==
2023
8th Grote Prijs Beerens
2024
3rd Antwerp Port Epic Ladies
8th Drentse Acht van Westerveld
