= Bellaria – Igea Marina =

Town and comune in Emilia-Romagna, Italy

Bellaria-Igea Marina
- Comune
- Comune di Bellaria-Igea Marina
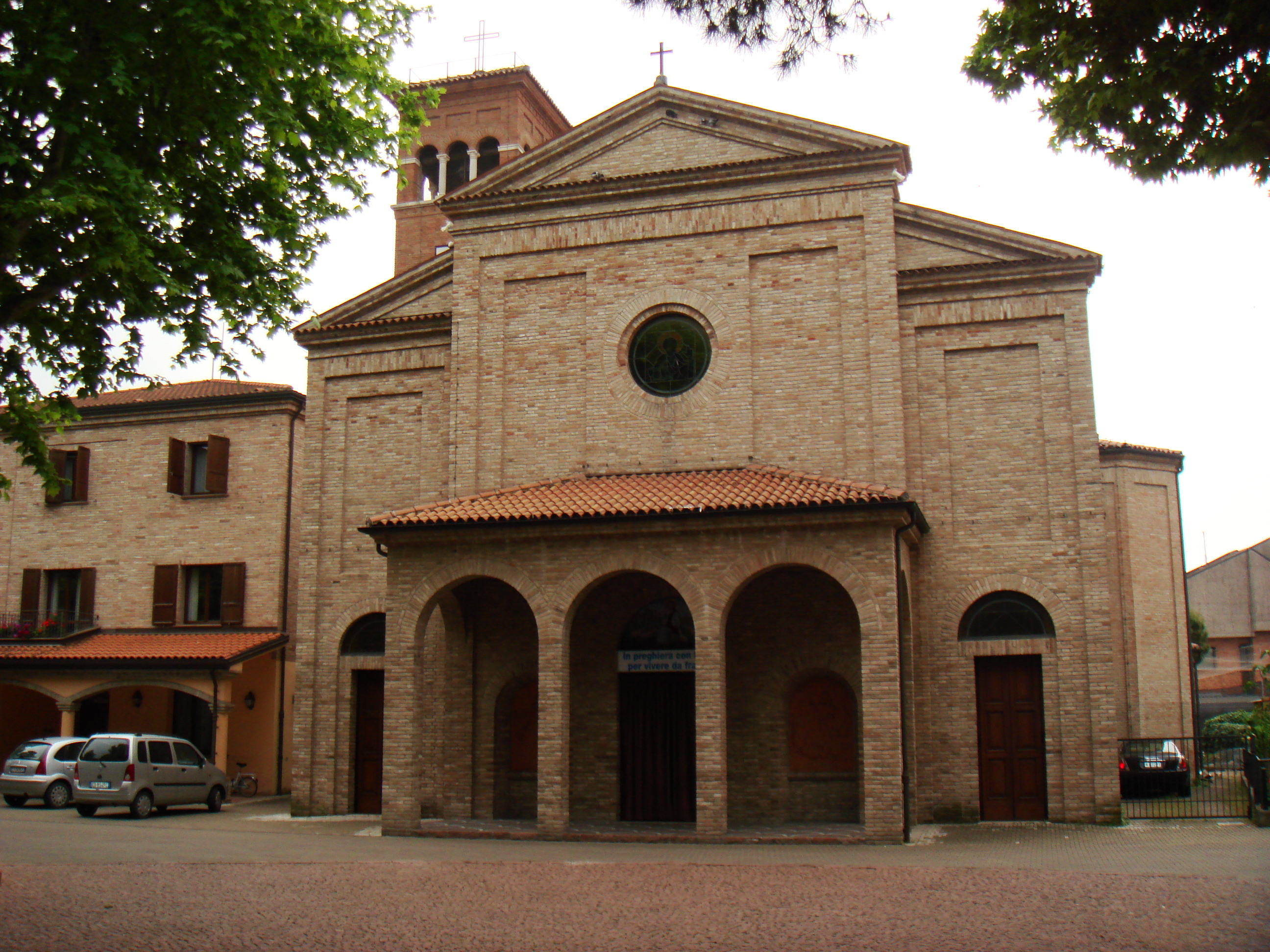
- Church of the Holy Heart in Bellaria.

- Location within Italy Location within Emilia-Romagna
- Coordinates: 44°9′N 12°27′E
- Country: Italy
- Region: Emilia-Romagna
- Province: Rimini (RN)
- Frazioni: Bellaria, Bordonchio, Cagnona, Igea Marina

Government
  - Mayor: Filippo Giorgetti

Area
  - Total: 18 km^{2} (6.9 sq mi)
- Elevation: 3 m (9.8 ft)

Population (2008)
  - Total: 18,319
  - Density: 1,000/km^{2} (2,600/sq mi)
- Demonym: Bellariesi – Igeani
- Time zone: UTC+1 (CET)
  - Summer (DST): UTC+2 (CEST)
- Postal code: 47814 (municipal capital and other frazioni), 47813 (Igea Marina)
- Dialing code: 0541
- Patron saint: Sant'Apollonia
- Saint day: 9 February
- Website: Official website

Bellaria – Igea Marina (Romagnol: Belària – Igea Maròina) is a town and comune in the province of Rimini, northern Italy, with approximately 18,300 inhabitants. It was separated from Rimini in 1956.
