= Pianezze =

- Comune
- Comune di Pianezze
- Location within Italy Location within Veneto
- Coordinates: 45°44′N 11°38′E
- Country: Italy
- Region: Veneto
- Province: Vicenza (VI)

Area
  - Total: 4 km^{2} (1.5 sq mi)

Population (2018-01-01)
  - Total: 1,854
  - Density: 460/km^{2} (1,200/sq mi)
- Time zone: UTC+1 (CET)
  - Summer (DST): UTC+2 (CEST)
- Postal code: 36060
- Dialing code: 0424
- Patron saint: Saint Lawrence the martyr
- Saint day: 10 August
- Website: Official website

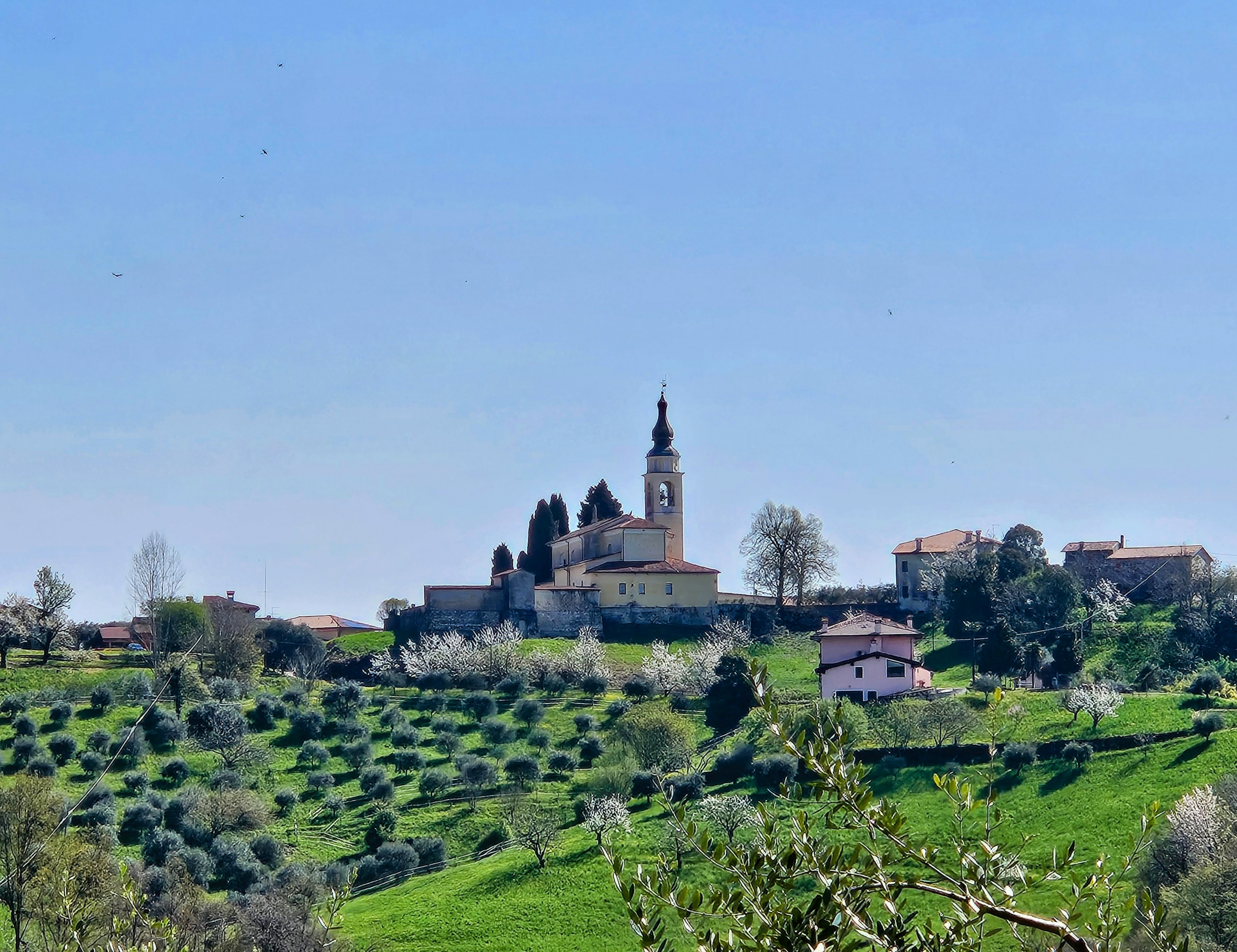
The village of Pianezze seen from Molvena

Pianezze is a town and comune in the province of Vicenza, Veneto, Italy. It is north of SP111. As of 2007 Pianezze had an estimated population of 1,988.
