= Dilyxine Miermont =

French cyclist

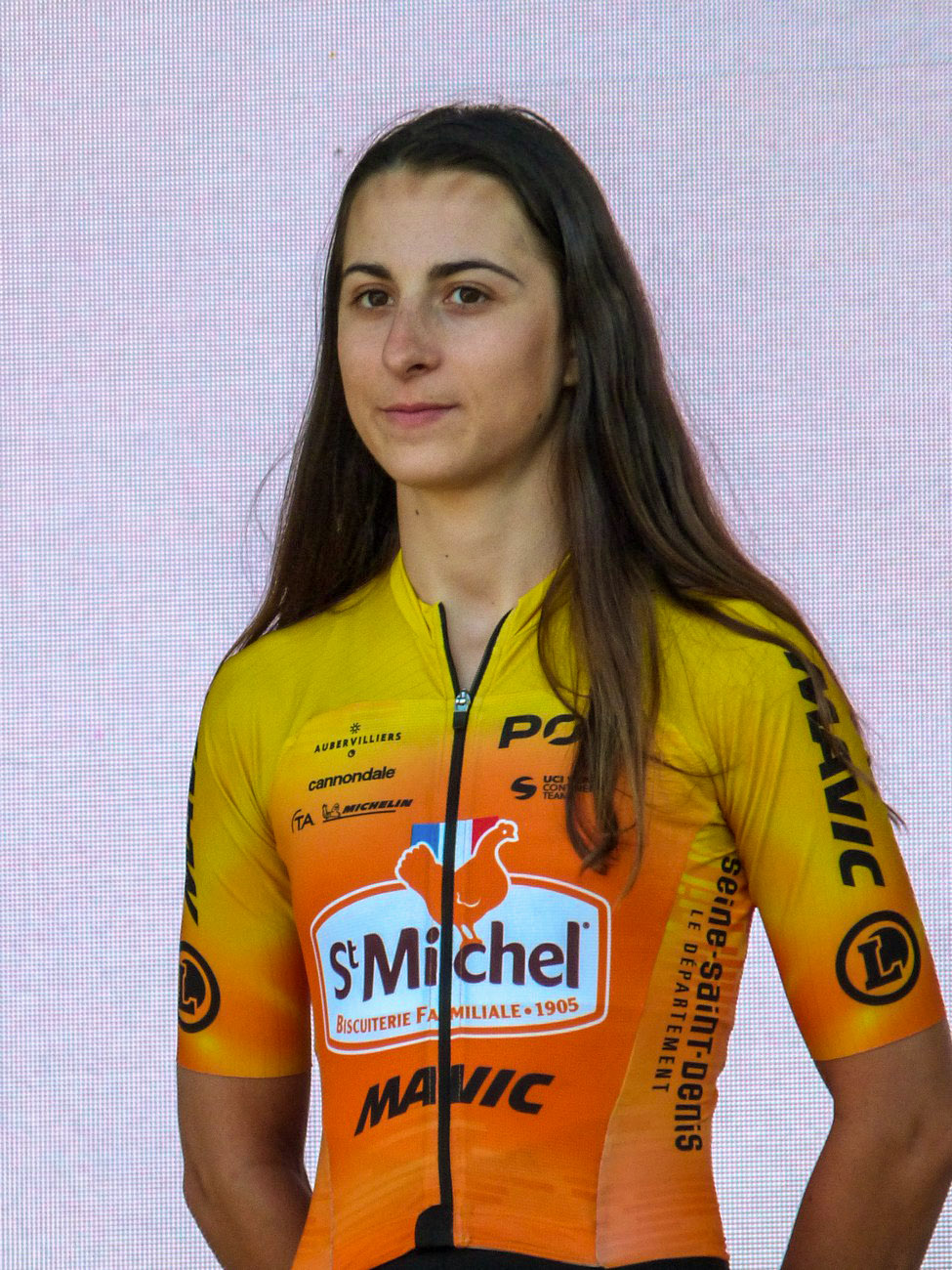
- Miermont in 2024

Personal information
- Born: 16 May 2000 Aurillac, France

Cycling career
- Sport: Cycling
- Current team: Ceratizit Pro Cycling
- Discipline: Road
- Role: Rider

Professional teams
- 2023–2024: St. Michel–Mavic–Auber93
- 2025–: Ceratizit Pro Cycling

Dilyxine Miermont (born 16 May 2000) is a French road cyclist, who currently rides for UCI Women's WorldTeam Ceratizit Pro Cycling.

== Major results ==
2018
National Junior Championships

3rd Time trial
7th Road race

2020
10th Time trial, National Under-23 Championships
2022
National Under-23 Championships

2nd Road race
3rd Time trial

2023
4th Alpes Grésivaudan Classic
National Championships

6th Time trial
7th Road race

2025
8th Cadel Evans Great Ocean Road Race
