= Anna Henderson (cyclist) =

British cyclist (born 1998)

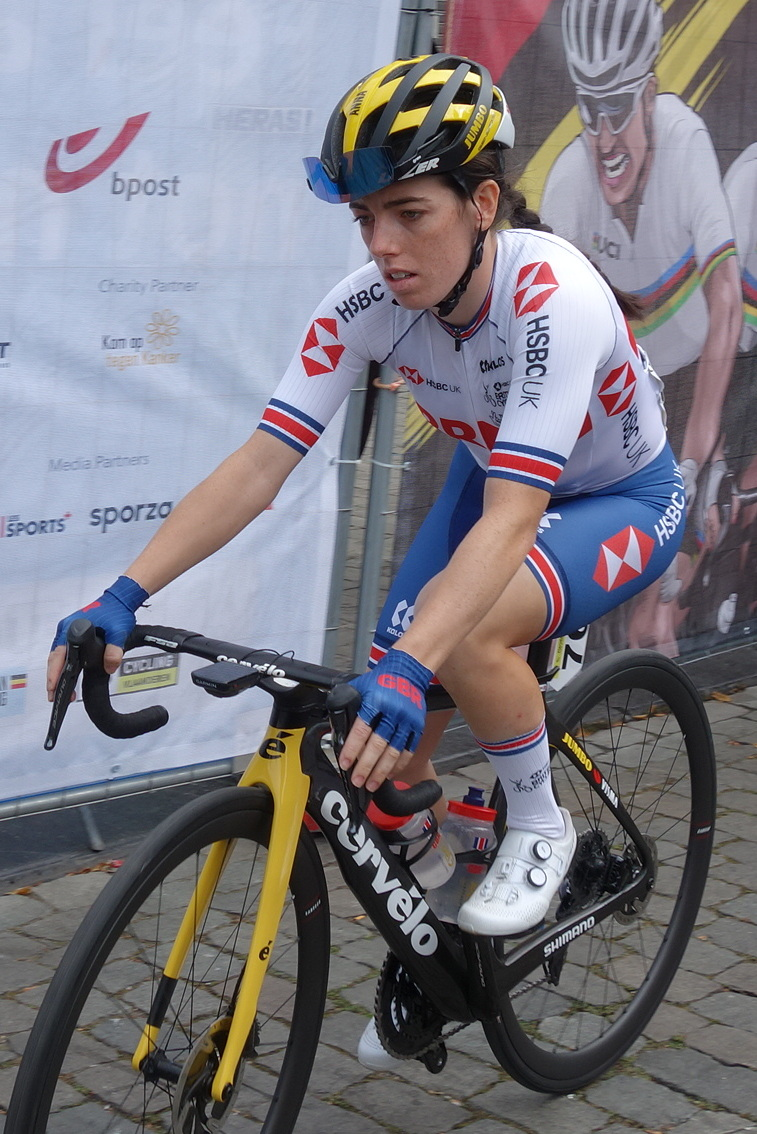
- Henderson at the 2021 UCI Road World Championships.

Personal information
- Full name: Anna Louise Henderson
- Nickname: Hendo
- Born: 14 November 1998 (age 27) Hemel Hempstead
- Height: 5 ft 3 in (160 cm)
- Weight: 56 kg (123 lb)

Cycling career
- Sport: Cycling
- Current team: Lidl–Trek
- Discipline: Road Cycling
- Role: Rider
- Rider type: Time Trial / All Rounder

Amateur teams
- 2016: Lovelo Cinelli RT
- 2017–2019: Team OnForm
- 2019: Tibco–Silicon Valley Bank (stagiaire)

Professional teams
- 2020: Team Sunweb
- 2021–2024: Team Jumbo–Visma
- 2025–: Lidl–Trek

Major wins
- Major Tours Giro d'Italia 1 individual stage (2025) One-day races and Classics National Time Trial Championships (2021, 2024)
Medal record
Women's road bicycle racing
Representing Great Britain
Olympic Games
Silver medal – second place	2024 Paris	Time trial
Commonwealth Games
Silver medal – second place	2022 Birmingham	Time trial
World Championships
Bronze medal – third place	2019 Yorkshire	Mixed team relay
European Championships
Silver medal – second place	2023 Drenthe	Time trial

Anna Louise Henderson (born 14 November 1998) is a British professional racing cyclist, who currently rides for UCI Women's World Tour Team Lidl–Trek. She took a silver medal in the time trial at the 2024 Summer Olympics.

== Early life and career ==
Henderson was born in Hemel Hempstead, Hertfordshire in 1998 and grew up in Edlesborough in Buckinghamshire. She attended Aylesbury High School. Growing up, her ambition was to win an Olympic medal in the Winter Olympics. She was a competitive ski racer, however in 2015, a major crash in the National Championships in Tignes forced Henderson to step back from Skiing and used cycling as a rehab method, she then changed her interest to cycling. She made the decision when she was fifteen. She had broken her leg and cycling was prescribed as helpful to her recovery. As a result, cycling became her focus. In 2021, Henderson graduated from the University of Birmingham, completing a Sports Science degree.

She rode in the women's road race event at the 2018 UCI Road World Championships. In 2018, Henderson won the British National Circuit Race Championships, and the under-23 British National Time Trial Championships in 2019.

In 2022, Henderson secured a silver medal in the Time Trial at the 2022 Commonwealth Games where Grace Brown of Australia took the gold medal. This was Henderson's first major medal representing her country.

In September 2023 she was in the Netherlands at the UEC European Road Championships. She was second in the Women's Time Trial and she was eighth in the Road race. She had come home in the time trial in first position, but Switzerland's Marlen Reusser finished after her with a better time.

Henderson qualified for the time trial at the 2024 Olympics and she was identified in the British press as a potential medalist. They cited her British titles and her success in gaining a silver at the previous year’s European championships, and fourth place in Glasgow at the world championships. She took a silver medal in the time trial at the 2024 Summer Olympics behind Grace Brown of Australia on very wet Parisian roads.

== Major results ==
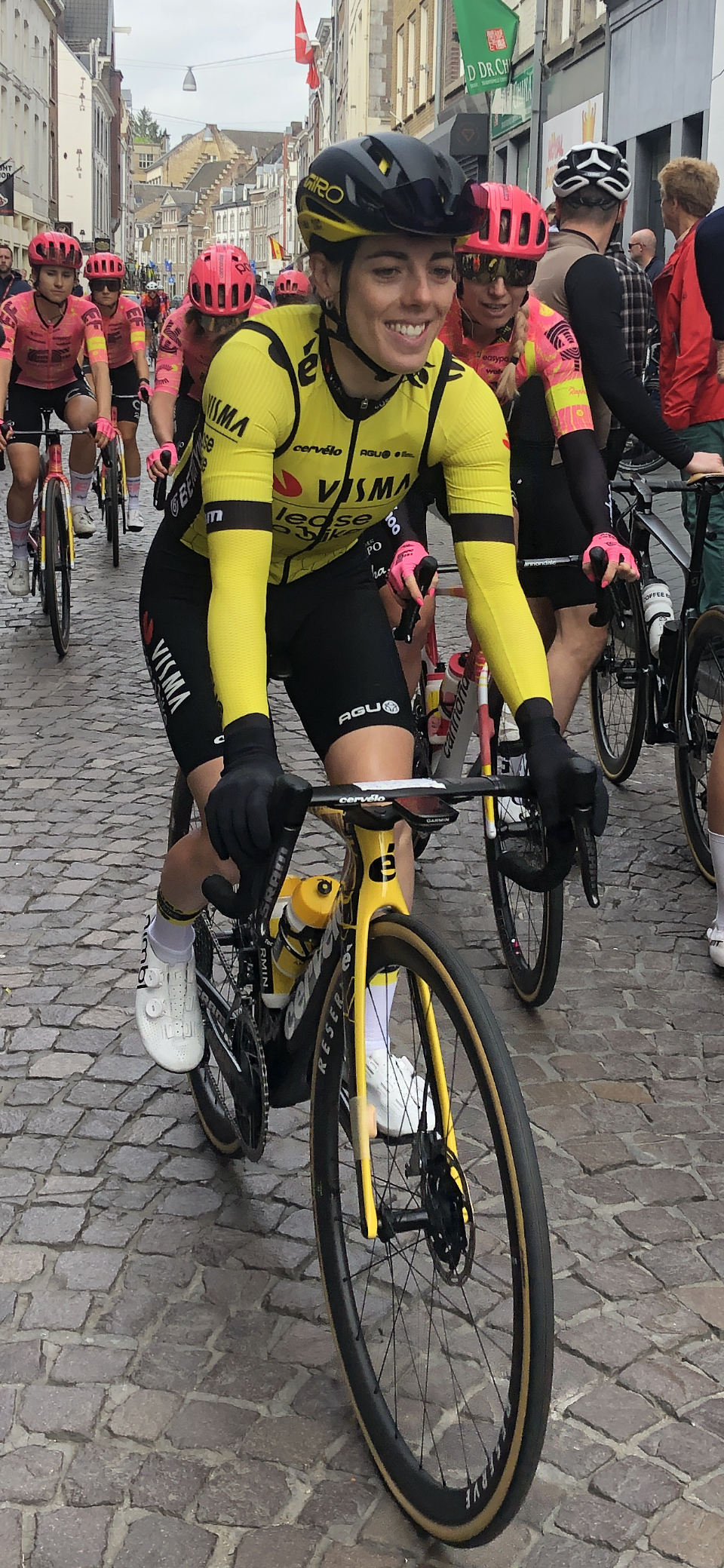
Anna Henderson in 2024 starting the Amstel Gold Race

2018
1st National Criterium Championships
Tour Series

1st Aberystwyth
1st Stevenage

2019
National Under-23 Road Championships

1st Road race
1st Time trial

Tour Series

1st Durham
1st Brooklands

2nd Road race, National Road Championships
3rd Team relay, UCI Road World Championships
2021
1st Time trial, National Road Championships
1st Derny, National Track Championships
1st Overall Kreiz Breizh Elites Dames

1st Stages 1 & 2

7th Dwars door het Hageland WE
8th Le Samyn
10th Overall Healthy Ageing Tour
10th GP de Plouay
2022
1st Prologue Grand Prix Elsy Jacobs
RideLondon Classique

1st Mountains classification
1st British rider classification

2nd Time trial, Commonwealth Games
3rd Road race, National Road Championships
7th Omloop Het Nieuwsblad
2023
La Vuelta Femenina

1st Stage 1 (TTT)
Held after Stage 1

UEC European Road Championships

2nd Time trial
8th Road race

3rd Road race, National Road Championships
3rd Overall Simac Ladies Tour
3rd Overall Baloise Ladies Tour
4th UCI Road World Championships – Women's time trial
8th Nokere Koerse
9th Gent–Wevelgem
9th Tour of Flanders
10th Ronde van Drenthe
2024
National Road Championships

1st Time trial
2nd Road race

2nd Time trial, Olympic Games
2nd Overall Tour of Britain
7th UCI Road World Championships – Women's time trial
2025
Giro d'Italia

1st Stage 2
Held & after Stage 2

2nd Time trial, National Road Championships
8th UCI Road World Championships – Women's time trial
8th Amstel Gold Race
