= Slovenian National Road Race Championships =

National road cycling championship in Slovenia

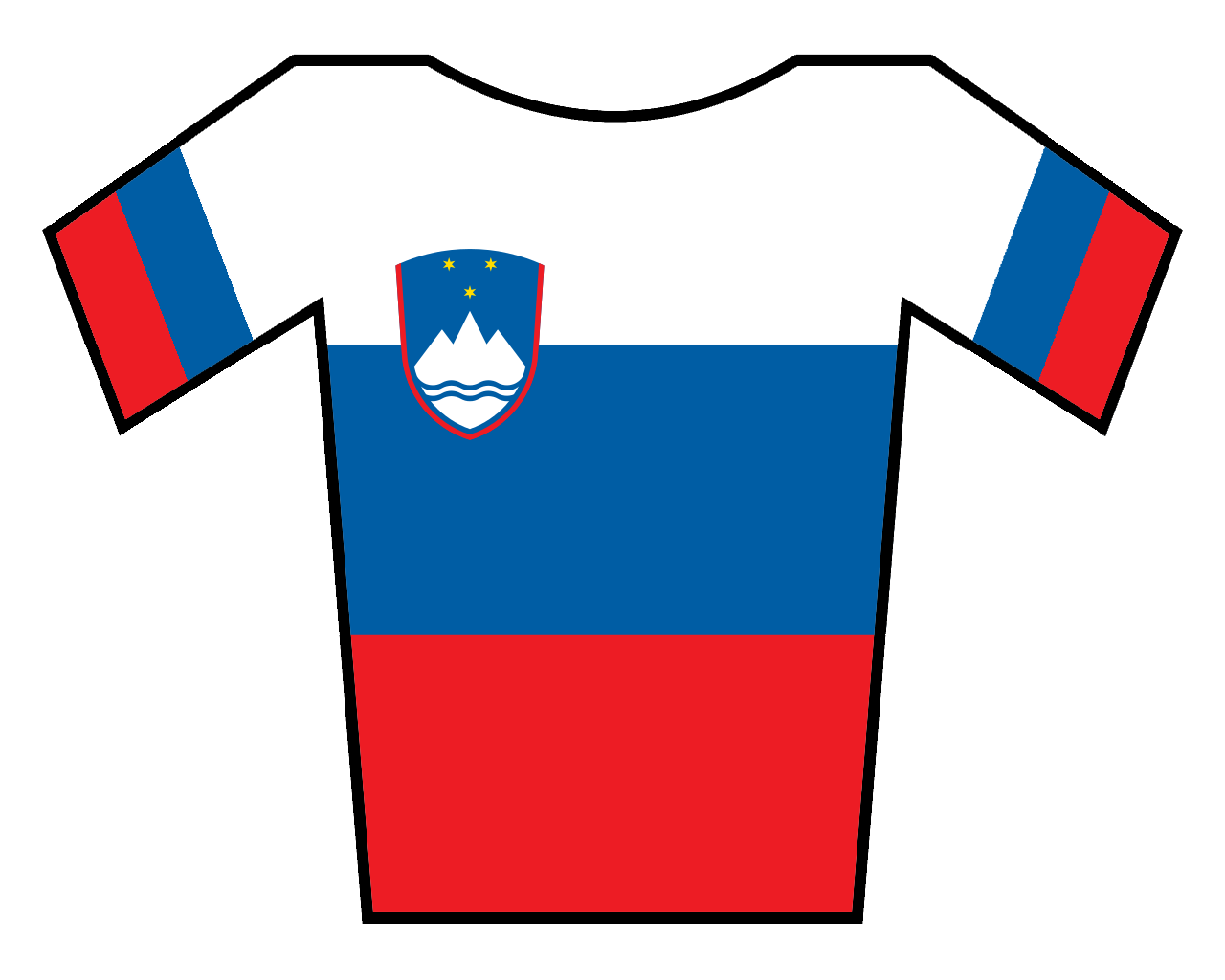

Race details
- Date: 20–30 June
- Discipline: Road race
- Competition: National Championships
- Type: One day circle race
- Organiser: Different clubs

History
- First edition: 2 August 1991
- Editions: 36 (men); 24 (women)
- First winner: Sandi Šmerc (M); Marija Trobec (W)
- Most wins: 9 – Polona Batagelj (W); 2 – Štangelj, Valjavec, Mahorič, Božič, Pibernik, Mohorič, Novak (M)
- Most recent: Roman Ermakov (M); Nika Bobnar (W)

The Slovenian National Road Race Championships have been held since independence in 1991.

Blaž Jarc (U23 cat.) set absolute best time in 2009 Championships and beat all top riders (Elite cat.), and the same thing with U23 also happened at National Time Trials (2006, 2007, 2009). After that, Slovenian Cycling Federation (KZS) decided to change rules and make it more understable to public. Unlike before, when the U23 results were counted only in their own category, from 2010 onwards, the potential U23 winner by time becomes the Elite - absolute champion (the same goes for 2nd, 3rd...etc).

== Statistics ==
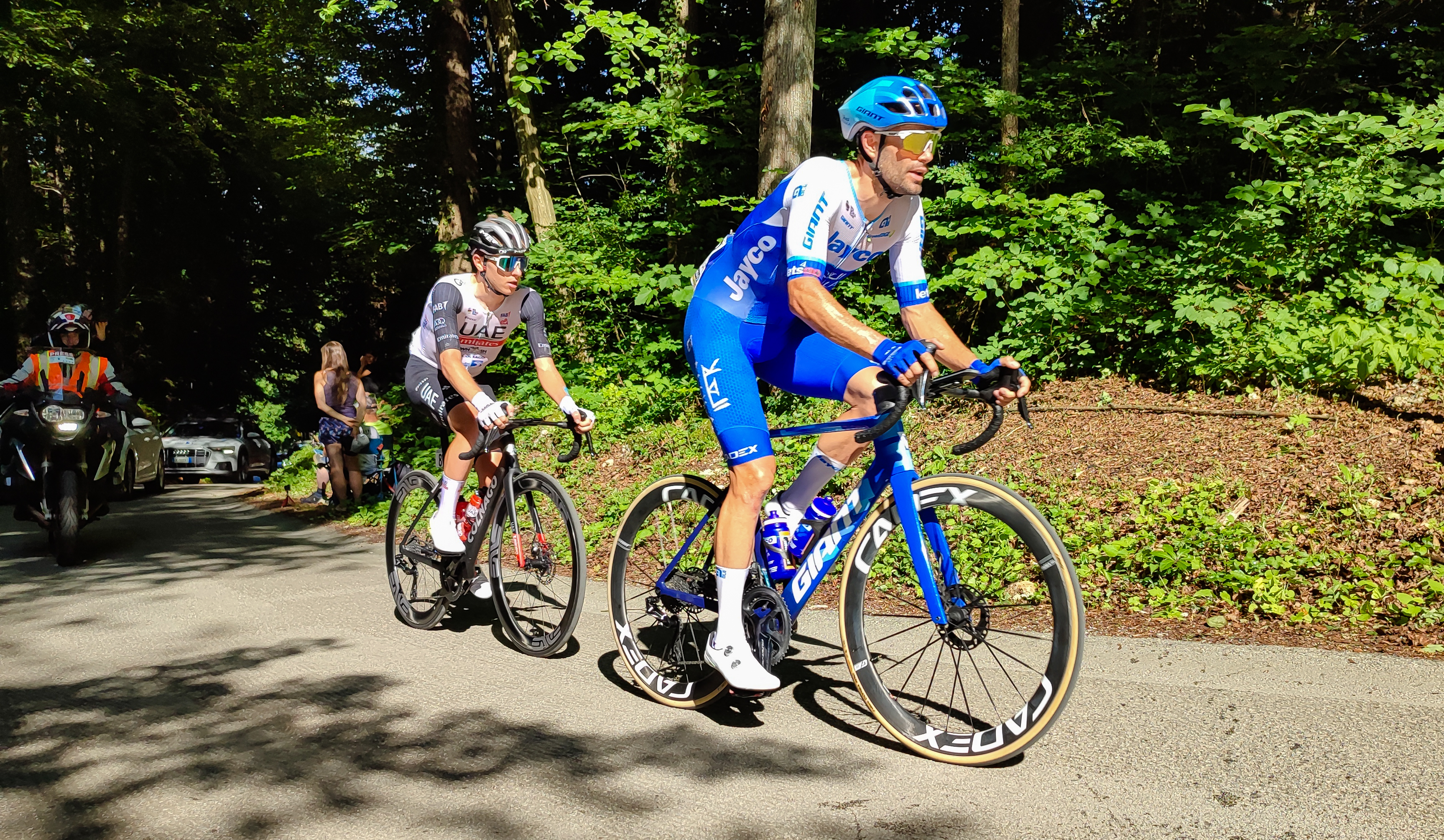
Luka Mezgec (Team Jayco–AlUla) and Tadej Pogačar (UAE Team Emirates) on the 2023 Slovenian National Road Race Championship. Mezgec led Pogačar for most of the race till last two rounds helping to break from Matej Mohorič (Team Bahrain Victorious).

=== Multiple champions ===
Riders that managed to win the Elite race more than once.

Titles	Men	Years
2	Gorazd Štangelj	1995, 2010
2	Tadej Valjavec	2003, 2007
2	Mitja Mahorič	2005, 2009
2	Borut Božič	2008, 2012
2	Luka Pibernik	2013, 2015
2	Matej Mohorič	2018, 2021
2	Domen Novak	2019, 2024
Titles	Women	Years
9	Polona Batagelj	2010, 2011, 2012, 2013, 2014, 2015, 2016, 2017, 2018
4	Eugenia Bujak	2019, 2021, 2022, 2025
3	Minka Logonder	1992, 1993, 1995
2	Vida Uršič	1994, 1996
2	Urša Pintar	2020, 2023

=== Hosts ===
Host	Men
7	Gabrje
6	Ptuj
5	Mirna Peč
2	Tržič
2	Radovljica
1	Slovenske Konjice
1	Lenart
1	Nova Gorica
1	Stari trg ob Kolpi
1	Cerkvenjak
1	Polhov Gradec
1	Kromberk
1	Ihan
1	Kranj
1	Cerklje – Ambrož
1	Koper
1	Maribor
1	Trebnje
1	Celje

Host	Women
4	Mirna Peč
3	Ptuj
3	Gabrje
2	Tržič
2	Radovljica
1	Slovenske Konjice
1	Lenart
1	Kromberk
1	Ihan
1	Kranj
1	Cerklje – Ambrož
1	Koper
1	Maribor
1	Trebnje
1	Celje

== Elite ==
At the 1st Championships held in Slovenske Konjice (1991), Slovenia was already over one month independent (widely recognized early next year), but cyclists were still under Yugoslav Cycling Federation (BSJ). President of BSJ forbade Slovenia to organize Nationals, but they did it anyway. A day later BSJ annulled by their opinion the "illegitimate" event. But Slovenian Cycling Federation recognized it as officially first.

=== Men ===
Map of hosts of all Road Race Championships since 1991

Matej Mohorič	Primož Roglič
100x	100x
2 titles	1 title

Date	Host	Length	Champion	Runner-up	3rd place
(Note: Slovenske Konjice (1991) – original scheduled stage was 183 km long (shortened for 1 lap or 12.2 km, due to upcoming dark))2 August 1991	Sl. Konjice	170.8 km	Sandi Šmerc (KK Merx Celje)	Aleš Pagon (Sava Kranj)	Marko Polanc (Sava Kranj)
13 June 1992	Ptuj	190 km	Valter Bonča (KK Astra Veletrgovina)	Brane Ugrenovič (KK Celje)	Sandi Papež (KD Krka)
8 August 1993	Tržič	150 km	Marko Velkovrh (Rog Ljubljana)	Bogdan Fink (KD Krka)	Jure Robič (Sava Kranj)
14 August 1994	Tržič	154 km	Martin Hvastija (Rog Ljubljana)	Brane Ugrenovič (KD Krka)	Sandi Papež (KD Krka)
20 August 1995	Ptuj	164.5 km	Gorazd Štangelj (KD Krka)	Robert Pintarič (Rog Ljubljana)	Borut Rovšček (Sava Kranj)
23 June 1996	Lenart	152 km	Bogdan Ravbar (KD Krka)	Sandi Papež (KD Krka)	Boštjan Mervar (KD Krka)
29 June 1997	Nova Gorica	163.6 km	Sašo Sviben (Radenska Rog)	Sandi Šmerc (Sava Kranj)	Gorazd Štangelj (Krka-Telekom)
5 July 1998	Gabrje	162 km	Igor Kranjec (Perutnina Ptuj Radenska Rog)	Gorazd Štangelj (Krka-Telekom)	Sandi Šmerc (Sava Kranj)
27 June 1999	Ptuj	157.3 km	Tadej Križnar (Sava Kranj)	Igor Kranjec (Perutnina Ptuj Radenska Rog)	Branko Filip (Gerolsteiner)
(Note: Gabrje (2000) – original winner Gorazd Štangelj was later disqualified due to doping. Then Hauptman became the champ)25 June 2000	Gabrje	162 km	Andrej Hauptman (Vini Caldirola)	Valter Bonča (Bosch Hausgeräte)	Uroš Murn (Mobilvetta Design–Rossin)
1 July 2001	Stari trg ob Kolpi	146 km	Martin Derganc (Perutnina Ptuj-Krka Telekom)	Boštjan Mervar (Perutnina Ptuj-Krka Telekom)	Branko Filip (Perutnina Ptuj-Krka Telekom)
30 June 2002	Ptuj	180 km	Boris Premužič (Perutnina Ptuj-Krka Telekom)	Sašo Sviben (Team Nürnberger)	Gregor Zajc (BK Kamen)
29 June 2003	Gabrje	143 km	Tadej Valjavec (Fassa Bortolo)	Valter Bonča (Perutnina Ptuj-Krka Telekom)	Boštjan Mervar (Perutnina Ptuj-Krka Telekom)
27 June 2004	Cerkvenjak	140 km	Uroš Murn (Phonak)	Boris Premužič (Sava Kranj)	Andrej Hauptman (Lampre)
26 June 2005	Ptuj	180 km	Mitja Mahorič (Perutnina Ptuj)	Gregor Gazvoda (Perutnina Ptuj)	Boštjan Rezman (Sava)
25 June 2006	Gabrje	141 km	Jure Golčer (Perutnina Ptuj)	Tomaž Nose (Adria Mobil)	Uroš Silar (Swiag Pro Cycling Team)
1 July 2007	Polhov Gradec	127.4 km	Tadej Valjavec (Lampre–Fondital)	Tomaž Nose (Adria Mobil)	Matej Gnezda (Radenska-Powerbar)
29 June 2008	Mirna Peč	173 km	Borut Božič (Cycle Collstrop)	Matej Stare (Perutnina Ptuj)	Gregor Gazvoda (Perutnina Ptuj)
(Note: Mirna Peč (2009) – Blaž Jarc (U23) was absolute winner by time, but Mitja Mahorič was the best among Elite)28 June 2009	Mirna Peč	178 km	Mitja Mahorič (Radenska–KD Financial Point)	Jure Kocjan (Carmiooro A Style)	Janez Brajkovič (Astana)
27 June 2010	Ptuj	177 km	Gorazd Štangelj (Astana)	Matej Gnezda (Adria Mobil)	Blaž Furdi (Sava)
25 June 2011	Kromberk	160 km	Grega Bole (Lampre–ISD)	Blaž Furdi (Adria Mobil)	Gregor Gazvoda (Perutnina Ptuj)
24 June 2012	Mirna Peč	166 km	Borut Božič (Astana)	Marko Kump (Adria Mobil)	Luka Pibernik (Radenska)
23 June 2013	Gabrje	143 km	Luka Pibernik (Radenska)	Matej Mugerli (Adria Mobil)	Jure Golčer (Tirol Cycling Team)
29 June 2014	Gabrje	165 km	Matej Mugerli (Adria Mobil)	Luka Mezgec (Giant–Shimano)	Kristjan Fajt (Adria Mobil)
28 June 2015	Mirna Peč	178.3 km	Luka Pibernik (Lampre–Merida)	Kristjan Fajt (Adria Mobil)	Borut Božič (Astana)
26 June 2016	Ihan	168 km	Jan Tratnik (Amplatz–BMC)	Luka Mezgec (Orica-GreenEDGE)	David Per (Adria Mobil)
25 June 2017	Kranj	163 km	Luka Mezgec (Orica-Scott)	Grega Bole (Bahrain-Merida)	Matej Mohorič (UAE Team Emirates)
24 June 2018	Mirna Peč	178.5 km	Matej Mohorič (Bahrain-Merida)	Domen Novak (Bahrain-Merida)	Luka Pibernik (Bahrain-Merida)
30 June 2019	Radovljica	149.8 km	Domen Novak (Bahrain-Merida)	Gašper Katrašnik (Adria Mobil)	Marko Kump (Adria Mobil)
21 June 2020	Cerklje – Ambrož	146 km	Primož Roglič (Team Jumbo–Visma)	Tadej Pogačar (UAE Team Emirates)	Matej Mohorič (Bahrain-McLaren)
20 June 2021	Koper	172 km	Matej Mohorič (Team Bahrain Victorious)	Jan Polanc (UAE Team Emirates)	Luka Mezgec (Team BikeExchange)
26 June 2022	Maribor	167 km	Kristijan Koren (Adria Mobil)	Matevž Govekar (Team Bahrain Victorious)	Luka Mezgec (Team BikeExchange–Jayco)
25 June 2023	Radovljica	156 km	Tadej Pogačar (UAE Team Emirates)	Luka Mezgec (Team Jayco–AlUla)	Matej Mohorič (Team Bahrain Victorious)
23 June 2024	Trebnje	150.5 km	Domen Novak (UAE Team Emirates)	Gal Glivar (UAE Team Emirates Gen Z)	Matej Mohorič (Team Bahrain Victorious)
29 June 2025	Celje	180.8 km	Jakob Omrzel (Bahrain Victorious Dev. Team)	Jaka Marolt (Factor Racing)	Matevž Govekar (Team Bahrain Victorious)
(Note: Gabrje (2026) – men's race was shortened for 2 laps (from 165 to 143 km) due to strong heat.)28 June 2026	Gabrje	143 km	Roman Ermakov (Team Bahrain Victorious)	Jakob Omrzel (Team Bahrain Victorious)	Tilen Finkšt (Solution Tech NIPPO Rali)

=== Women ===
Polona Batagelj	Eugenia Bujak
100x	100x
9 titles	4 titles

Date	Host	Length	Champion	Runner-up	3rd place
2 August 1991	Sl. Konjice	61 km	Marija Trobec (KK Soča)	Melita Podgornik (KK Soča)	Branka Debeljak (KK Soča)
13 June 1992	Ptuj	76 km	Minka Logonder (KK Janez Peternel)	Vida Uršič (KK Janez Peternel)	Marija Trobec (KK Soča)
8 August 1993	Tržič	37.5 km	Minka Logonder (Proloco Scott)	Vida Uršič (Proloco Scott)	Marjeta Sajevec (KD Krka)
14 August 1994	Tržič	30.8 km	Vida Uršič (Proloco Scott)	Minka Logonder (Proloco Scott)	Marjeta Sajevec (KD Krka)
20 August 1995	Ptuj (Note: Ptuj (1995) – Vida Uršič finished as 2nd, was disqualified. As a result of this Marjeta Sajevec (3rd) and Brank (4th), both advanced for one place up.)	70.5 km	Minka Logonder (Proloco Scott)	Marjeta Sajevec (KD Krka)	Brank (Astra)
23 June 1996	Lenart	57 km	Vida Uršič (Stop Team Jezersko)	Marija Trobec (Stop Team Jezersko)	Minka Logonder (Stop Team Jezersko)
1997 – 2008	Women's Slovenian National Road Championships not held				
28 June 2009	Mirna Peč	71.4 km	Sigrid Corneo (Menikini – Selle Italia)	Blaža Klemenčič (Felt International MTB Team)	Polona Batagelj (Pedale Castellano)
25 June 2010	Ptuj	60 km	Polona Batagelj (Klub Polet Garmin)	Sigrid Corneo (Top Girls Fassa Bortolo)	Ajda Opeka (Klub Polet Garmin)
25 June 2011	Kromberk	64 km	Polona Batagelj (Klub Polet Garmin)	Urša Pintar (Klub Polet Garmin)	Živa Verbič (Klub Polet Garmin)
24 June 2012	Mirna Peč	71.4 km	Polona Batagelj (Klub Polet Garmin)	Petra Zrimšek (BePink)	Urša Pintar (Klub Polet Garmin)
23 June 2013	Gabrje	66 km	Polona Batagelj (E.Leclerc - Klub Polet)	Špela Kern (E.Leclerc - Klub Polet)	Urša Pintar (E.Leclerc - Klub Polet)
29 June 2014	Gabrje	66 km	Polona Batagelj (BTC City Ljubljana)	Urša Pintar (BTC City Ljubljana)	Špela Kern (BTC City Ljubljana)
28 June 2015	Mirna Peč	71.4 km	Polona Batagelj (BTC City Ljubljana)	Urša Pintar (BTC City Ljubljana)	Špela Kern (BTC City Ljubljana)
26 June 2016	Ihan	70 km	Polona Batagelj (BTC City Ljubljana)	Urša Pintar (BTC City Ljubljana)	Špela Kern (BTC City Ljubljana)
25 June 2017	Kranj	65.2 km	Polona Batagelj (BTC City Ljubljana)	Špela Kern (Bizkaia–Durango)	Katja Jeretina (Adria Mobil)
24 June 2018	Mirna Peč	107.1 km	Polona Batagelj (BTC City Ljubljana)	Urša Pintar (BTC City Ljubljana)	Špela Kern (Health Mate–Cyclelive Team)
30 June 2019	Radovljica	85.6 km	Eugenia Bujak (BTC City Ljubljana)	Urša Pintar (BTC City Ljubljana)	Urška Žigart (BTC City Ljubljana)
21 June 2020	Cerklje–Ambrož	68 km	Urša Pintar (Alé BTC Ljubljana)	Špela Kern (Lviv Cycling Team)	Urška Žigart (Alé BTC Ljubljana)
20 June 2021	Koper	103 km	Eugenia Bujak (Alé BTC Ljubljana)	Urša Pintar (Alé BTC Ljubljana)	Špela Kern (Massi–Tactic)
26 June 2022	Maribor	100 km	Eugenia Bujak (UAE Team ADQ)	Špela Kern (Massi–Tactic)	Urša Pintar (UAE Team ADQ)
25 June 2023	Radovljica	97.5 km	Urša Pintar (BTC City Ljubljana Scott)	Urška Žigart (Team Jayco–AlUla)	Špela Kern (Cofidis)
23 June 2024	Trebnje	107.5 km	Urška Žigart (Liv AlUla Jayco)	Urša Pintar (BTC City Ljubljana Zhiraf Am.)	Špela Kern (Cofidis)
29 June 2025	Celje	113 km	Eugenia Bujak (Cofidis)	Nika Bobnar (NEXETIS)	Špela Kern (Cofidis)
(Note: Gabrje (2026) – women's race was shortened for 1 lap (from 88 to 77 km) due to strong heat.)28 June 2026	Gabrje	77 km	Nika Bobnar (NEXETIS)	Nika Fajfar (B. to Win BTC City Ljubljana)	Tjaša Sušnik (RC ARBÖ-ASKÖ Rap. Knitt.)

== See also ==
- Slovenian National Time Trial Championships
- National Road Cycling Championships
- Yugoslav National Road Race Championships
