= 2017 UCI Road World Championships – Women's team time trial =

Cycling race

Women's team time trial
2017 UCI Road World Championships

Race details
- Dates: 17 September 2017
- Stages: 1
- Distance: 42.5 km (26.41 mi)
- Winning time: 55' 41.63"

Medalists
	Gold	Team Sunweb
	Silver	Boels–Dolmans
	Bronze	Cervélo–Bigla Pro Cycling

The Women's team time trial of the 2017 UCI Road World Championships was a cycling event that took place on 17 September 2017 in Bergen, Norway. Nine teams and a total of fifty-four riders contested the event, the opening race of the Road World Championships.

Team Sunweb from the Netherlands won the world title for the first time, completing the race at an average speed of 45.786 kilometres per hour (28.450 mph), 12.43 seconds faster than another Dutch team Boels–Dolmans, the defending world champions. The bronze medal went to Cervélo–Bigla Pro Cycling from Germany, 28 seconds behind Boels–Dolmans.

Amongst the winning riders for Team Sunweb, Ellen van Dijk won her fourth team time trial world championships, having won in 2012 and 2013 for Specialized–lululemon and 2016 for Boels–Dolmans. The five remaining riders won their first world title, in a result described as an "upset", as it was the squad's first team time trial win of 2017.

== Final classification ==
All nine teams completed the 42.5-kilometre (26.4 mi)-long course.

Rank	Team	Riders	Time
1	(Netherlands) Team Sunweb	Lucinda Brand (NED); Leah Kirchmann (CAN); Floortje Mackaij (NED); Coryn Rivera (USA); Sabrina Stultiens (NED); Ellen van Dijk (NED)	55' 41.63"
2	(Netherlands) Boels–Dolmans	Chantal Blaak (NED); Karol-Ann Canuel (CAN); Megan Guarnier (USA); Christine Majerus (LUX); Amy Pieters (NED); Anna van der Breggen (NED)	+ 12.43"
3	(Germany) Cervélo–Bigla Pro Cycling	Stephanie Gaumnitz (DEU); Lisa Klein (DEU); Clara Koppenburg (DEU); Lotta Lepistö (FIN); Cecilie Uttrup Ludwig (DEN); Ashleigh Moolman (RSA)	+ 28.03"
4	(Germany) Canyon–SRAM	Hannah Barnes (GBR); Lisa Brennauer (DEU); Elena Cecchini (ITA); Mieke Kröger (DEU); Alexis Ryan (USA); Trixi Worrack (DEU)	+ 1' 04.79"
5	(Denmark) Team Virtu Cycling	Claudia Koster (NED); Christina Siggaard (DEN); Pernille Mathiesen (DEN); Amber Neben (USA); Sara Penton (SWE); Linda Villumsen (NZL)	+ 2' 51.52"
6	(France) FDJ Nouvelle-Aquitaine Futuroscope	Aude Biannic (FRA); Coralie Demay (FRA); Eugénie Duval (FRA); Roxane Fournier (FRA); Shara Gillow (AUS); Roxane Knetemann (NED)	+ 3' 23.04"
7	(Slovenia) BTC City Ljubljana	Polona Batagelj (SLO); Maaike Boogaard (NED); Eugenia Bujak (POL); Corinna Lechner (DEU); Hanna Nilsson (SWE); Urša Pintar (SLO)	+ 3' 46.58"
8	(Italy) Bepink–Cogeas	Alison Jackson (CAN); Francesca Pattaro (ITA); Katia Ragusa (ITA); Ilaria Sanguineti (ITA); Silvia Valsecchi (ITA); Olga Zabelinskaya (RUS)	+ 4' 07.29"
9	(Norway) Team Hitec Products	Charlotte Becker (DEU); Miriam Bjørnsrud (NOR); Simona Frapporti (ITA); Cecilie Gotaas Johnsen (NOR); Nina Kessler (NED); Thea Thorsen (NOR)	+ 4' 58.84"
