= 2015 La Route de France =

Race details
- Dates: 9–15 August 2015
- Stages: 7
- Distance: 668.2 km (415.2 mi)
- Winning time: 17hr 16' 47"

Results
Jersey awarded to the overall winner	Winner	Elisa Longo Borghini (ITA)	(Wiggle–Honda)
	Second	Amber Neben (USA)	(BePink–La Classica)
	Third	Claudia Lichtenberg (GER)	(Team Liv–Plantur)
	Mountains	Tetyana Ryabchenko (UKR)	(Inpa Sottoli Giusfredi)
Jersey awarded to the youth classification winner	Youth	Jenelle Crooks (AUS)	(Australia)

The 2015 La Route de France is an elite women's cycling stage race that took place in France between 9 and 15 August. It was the ninth edition of La Route de France. The race was won by Elisa Longo Borghini (Wiggle–Honda), who won two stages including the queen stage to La Planche des Belles Filles. She finished 1' 18" ahead of Amber Neben (BePink–La Classica), with Claudia Lichtenberg a further eight seconds back in third. The best young rider was Jenelle Crooks (Australia). The mountains classification was won by Tetyana Ryabchenko (Inpa Sottoli Giusfredi).

== Teams ==
16 teams were invited to take part in the race.

UCI Women's Teams

- Team Liv–Plantur
- Topsport Vlaanderen–Pro-Duo
- Lointek
- Team Hitec Products
- Optum–KBS
- Lotto–Soudal Ladies
- Inpa Sottoli Giusfredi
- Wiggle–Honda
- Poitou-Charentes.Futuroscope.86
- BTC City Ljubljana
- BePink–La Classica
- Astana–Acca Due O
- Bizkaia–Durango

National teams

- Australia
- France
- Russia

== Stages ==
=== Prologue ===
9 August 2015 – Enghien-les-Bains to Enghien-les-Bains, 3 km (2 mi) (ITT) The opening prologue was a 3 km loop of left hand bends ideally suited to track cycling specialists. Amy Pieters of Team Liv–Plantur won the opening stage with an average speed of 49.315 km/h.

Result of prologue
Rank	Rider	Team	Time
1	Amy Pieters (NED)	Team Liv–Plantur	3' 39"
2	Eugenia Bujak (POL)	BTC City Ljubljana	+2"
3	Brianna Walle (USA)	Optum–KBS	+3"
4	Jaime Nielsen (NZL)	BePink–La Classica	+3"
5	Annette Edmondson (AUS)	Wiggle–Honda	+3"
6	Leah Kirchmann (CAN)	Optum–KBS	+5"
7	Lauren Kitchen (AUS)	Team Hitec Products	+5"
8	Elisa Longo Borghini (ITA)	Wiggle–Honda	+6"
9	Aude Biannic (FRA)	Poitou-Charentes.Futuroscope.86	+6"
10	Martina Ritter (AUT)	BTC City Ljubljana	+7"
Source: ProCyclingStats

General classification after prologue
Rank	Rider	Team	Time
1	Amy Pieters (NED)	Team Liv–Plantur	3' 39"
2	Eugenia Bujak (POL)	BTC City Ljubljana	+2"
3	Brianna Walle (USA)	Optum–KBS	+3"
4	Jaime Nielsen (NZL)	BePink–La Classica	+3"
5	Annette Edmondson (AUS)	Wiggle–Honda	+3"
6	Leah Kirchmann (CAN)	Optum–KBS	+5"
7	Lauren Kitchen (AUS)	Team Hitec Products	+5"
8	Elisa Longo Borghini (ITA)	Wiggle–Honda	+6"
9	Aude Biannic (FRA)	Poitou-Charentes.Futuroscope.86	+6"
10	Martina Ritter (AUT)	BTC City Ljubljana	+7"
Source: ProCyclingStats

=== Stage 1 ===
10 August 2015 – Avon to Briare, 127.1 km (79.0 mi) The first stage had a delayed start with local organisers in dispute with police around road closures. It was won by Lucy Garner of Team Liv–Plantur.

Result of stage 1
Rank	Rider	Team	Time
1	Lucy Garner (GBR)	Team Liv–Plantur	2hr 47' 49"
2	Annette Edmondson (AUS)	Wiggle–Honda	+0"
3	Roxane Fournier (FRA)	Poitou-Charentes.Futuroscope.86	+0"
4	Anna Trevisi (ITA)	Inpa Sottoli Giusfredi	+0"
5	Aurore Verhoeven (FRA)	Lointek	+0"
6	Giorgia Bronzini (ITA)	Wiggle–Honda	+0"
7	Lauren Kitchen (AUS)	Team Hitec Products	+0"
8	Leah Kirchmann (CAN)	Optum–KBS	+0"
9	Amy Pieters (NED)	Team Liv–Plantur	+0"
10	Kimberley Wells (AUS)	Australia	+0"
Source: ProCyclingStats

General classification after stage 1
Rank	Rider	Team	Time
1	Amy Pieters (NED)	Team Liv–Plantur	2hr 51' 28"
2	Eugenia Bujak (POL)	BTC City Ljubljana	+3"
3	Brianna Walle (USA)	Optum–KBS	+4"
4	Jaime Nielsen (NZL)	BePink–La Classica	+4"
5	Annette Edmondson (AUS)	Wiggle–Honda	+4"
6	Leah Kirchmann (CAN)	Optum–KBS	+5"
7	Lauren Kitchen (AUS)	Team Hitec Products	+6"
8	Elisa Longo Borghini (ITA)	Wiggle–Honda	+6"
9	Aude Biannic (FRA)	Poitou-Charentes.Futuroscope.86	+7"
10	Martina Ritter (AUT)	BTC City Ljubljana	+7"
Source: ProCyclingStats

=== Stage 2 ===
11 August 2015 – Villemandeur to Bourges, 118 km (73 mi) This was another flat stage suited to road sprinters. Two time world champion Giorgia Bronzini of Team Wiggle–Honda won from race leader Amy Pieters (Liv-Plantur) and a fast finishing Kimberley Wells (Australia).

Result of stage 2
Rank	Rider	Team	Time
1	Giorgia Bronzini (ITA)	Wiggle–Honda	2hr 59' 13"
2	Amy Pieters (NED)	Team Liv–Plantur	+0"
3	Kimberley Wells (AUS)	Australia	+0"
4	Annette Edmondson (AUS)	Wiggle–Honda	+0"
5	Lauren Kitchen (AUS)	Team Hitec Products	+0"
6	Aurore Verhoeven (FRA)	Lointek	+0"
7	Roxane Fournier (FRA)	Poitou-Charentes.Futuroscope.86	+0"
8	Anna Trevisi (ITA)	Inpa Sottoli Giusfredi	+0"
9	Oxana Kozonchuk (RUS)	Russia	+0"
10	Claudia Lichtenberg (GER)	Team Liv–Plantur	+0"
Source: ProCyclingStats

General classification after stage 2
Rank	Rider	Team	Time
1	Amy Pieters (NED)	Team Liv–Plantur	5hr 50' 41"
2	Eugenia Bujak (POL)	BTC City Ljubljana	+3"
3	Brianna Walle (USA)	Optum–KBS	+4"
4	Jaime Nielsen (NZL)	BePink–La Classica	+4"
5	Annette Edmondson (AUS)	Wiggle–Honda	+4"
6	Leah Kirchmann (CAN)	Optum–KBS	+5"
7	Lauren Kitchen (AUS)	Team Hitec Products	+6"
8	Elisa Longo Borghini (ITA)	Wiggle–Honda	+6"
9	Aude Biannic (FRA)	Poitou-Charentes.Futuroscope.86	+7"
10	Martina Ritter (AUT)	BTC City Ljubljana	+7"
Source: ProCyclingStats

=== Stage 3 ===
12 August 2015 – Nevers to Avallon, 113.3 km (70.4 mi) Elisa Longo Borghini (Ita) Wiggle–Honda was victorious on a mountainous stage 3 gaining 13 seconds from her nearest rival Eugenia Bujak.

Result of stage 3
Rank	Rider	Team	Time
1	Elisa Longo Borghini (ITA)	Wiggle–Honda	3hr 06' 17"
2	Eugenia Bujak (POL)	BTC City Ljubljana	+13"
3	Brianna Walle (USA)	Optum–KBS	+13"
4	Mayuko Hagiwara (JPN)	Wiggle–Honda	+13"
5	Amy Pieters (NED)	Team Liv–Plantur	+13"
6	Lauren Kitchen (AUS)	Team Hitec Products	+13"
7	Amber Neben (USA)	BePink–La Classica	+13"
8	Ane Santesteban (ESP)	Inpa Sottoli Giusfredi	+13"
9	Jessie Daams (BEL)	LBL	+13"
10	Polona Batagelj (SLO)	BTC City Ljubljana	+13"
Source: ProCyclingStats

General classification after stage 3
Rank	Rider	Team	Time
1	Elisa Longo Borghini (ITA)	Wiggle–Honda	8hr 57' 09"
2	Amy Pieters (NED)	Team Liv–Plantur	+2"
3	Eugenia Bujak (POL)	BTC City Ljubljana	+5"
4	Lauren Kitchen (AUS)	Team Hitec Products	+8"
5	Brianna Walle (USA)	Optum–KBS	+11"
6	Claudia Lichtenberg (GER)	Team Liv–Plantur	+13"
7	Carlee Taylor (AUS)	Lotto–Soudal Ladies	+19"
8	Jessie Daams (BEL)	Lotto–Soudal Ladies	+19"
9	Polona Batagelj (SLO)	BTC City Ljubljana	+20"
10	Amber Neben (USA)	BePink–La Classica	+23"
Source: ProCyclingStats

=== Stage 4 ===
13 August 2015 – Autun to Louhans, 103 km (64 mi) Long-limbed Australian all-rounder Loren Rowney won stage 4 ahead of fellow Australian Annette Edmondson in a sprint finish.

Result of stage 4
Rank	Rider	Team	Time
1	Loren Rowney (AUS)	Australia	2hr 32' 31"
2	Annette Edmondson (AUS)	Wiggle–Honda	+0"
3	Roxane Fournier (FRA)	Poitou-Charentes.Futuroscope.86	+1"
4	Leah Kirchmann (CAN)	Optum–KBS	+1"
5	Fiona Dutriaux (FRA)	France	+3"
6	Elisa Longo Borghini (ITA)	Wiggle–Honda	+3"
7	Aurore Verhoeven (FRA)	Lointek	+3"
8	Anna Trevisi (ITA)	Inpa Sottoli Giusfredi	+3"
9	Daiva Tušlaitė (LIT)	Inpa Sottoli Giusfredi	+3"
10	Jessy Druyts (BEL)	Topsport Vlaanderen–Pro-Duo	+5"
Source: ProCyclingStats

General classification after stage 4
Rank	Rider	Team	Time
1	Elisa Longo Borghini (ITA)	Wiggle–Honda	11hr 29' 43"
2	Amy Pieters (NED)	Team Liv–Plantur	+4"
3	Eugenia Bujak (POL)	BTC City Ljubljana	+7"
4	Lauren Kitchen (AUS)	Team Hitec Products	+10"
5	Brianna Walle (USA)	Optum–KBS	+13"
6	Claudia Lichtenberg (GER)	Team Liv–Plantur	+15"
7	Carlee Taylor (AUS)	Lotto–Soudal Ladies	+21"
8	Jessie Daams (BEL)	Lotto–Soudal Ladies	+21"
9	Polona Batagelj (SLO)	BTC City Ljubljana	+22"
10	Amber Neben (USA)	BePink–La Classica	+25"
Source: ProCyclingStats

=== Stage 5 ===
14 August 2015 – Vesoul to La Planche des Belles Filles, 87.4 km (54.3 mi) Elisa Longo Borghini Wiggle–Honda won again on a mountain-top finish, gaining an additional 45 seconds on second-placed veteran Amber Neben.

Result of stage 5
Rank	Rider	Team	Time
1	Elisa Longo Borghini (ITA)	Wiggle–Honda	2hr 42' 12"
2	Amber Neben (USA)	BePink–La Classica	+45"
3	Claudia Lichtenberg (GER)	Team Liv–Plantur	+1' 03"
4	Tetyana Ryabchenko (UKR)	Inpa Sottoli Giusfredi	+1' 36"
5	Carlee Taylor (AUS)	Lotto–Soudal Ladies	+1' 57"
6	Fanny Leleu (FRA)	France	+2' 01"
7	Marina Likhanova (RUS)	Servetto Footon	+2' 07"
8	Polona Batagelj (SLO)	BTC City Ljubljana	+2' 09"
9	Jenelle Crooks (AUS)	Australia	+2' 29"
10	Eugenia Bujak (POL)	BTC City Ljubljana	+3' 16"
Source: ProCyclingStats

General classification after stage 5
Rank	Rider	Team	Time
1	Elisa Longo Borghini (ITA)	Wiggle–Honda	14hr 11' 55"
2	Amber Neben (USA)	BePink–La Classica	+1' 10"
3	Claudia Lichtenberg (GER)	Team Liv–Plantur	+1' 18"
4	Carlee Taylor (AUS)	Lotto–Soudal Ladies	+2' 18"
5	Tetyana Ryabchenko (UKR)	Inpa Sottoli Giusfredi	+2' 21"
6	Polona Batagelj (SLO)	BTC City Ljubljana	+2' 31"
7	Jenelle Crooks (AUS)	Australia	+2' 56"
8	Eugenia Bujak (POL)	BTC City Ljubljana	+3' 23"
9	Brianna Walle (USA)	Optum–KBS	+3' 38"
10	Jessie Daams (BEL)	Lotto–Soudal Ladies	+4' 11"
Source: ProCyclingStats

=== Stage 6 ===
15 August 2015 – Soultzmatt to Guebwiller, 116.4 km (72.3 mi) Giorgia Bronzini from Wiggle–Honda sprinted to another victory ahead of consistent Loren Rowney, and Amy Pieters.

Result of stage 6
Rank	Rider	Team	Time
1	Giorgia Bronzini (ITA)	Wiggle–Honda	3hr 04' 52"
2	Loren Rowney (AUS)	Velocio–SRAM	+0"
3	Amy Pieters (NED)	Team Liv–Plantur	+0"
4	Leah Kirchmann (CAN)	Optum–KBS	+0"
5	Kaat Hannes (BEL)	Topsport Vlaanderen–Pro-Duo	+0"
6	Lauren Kitchen (AUS)	Team Hitec Products	+0"
7	Aurore Verhoeven (FRA)	Lointek	+0"
8	Eugenia Bujak (POL)	BTC City Ljubljana	+0"
9	Roxane Fournier (FRA)	Poitou-Charentes.Futuroscope.86	+0"
10	Cecilie Gotaas Johnsen (NOR)	Team Hitec Products	+0"
Source: ProCyclingStats

Final general classification
Rank	Rider	Team	Time
1	Elisa Longo Borghini (ITA)	Wiggle–Honda	17hr 16' 47"
2	Amber Neben (USA)	BePink–La Classica	+1' 10"
3	Claudia Lichtenberg (GER)	Team Liv–Plantur	+1' 18"
4	Carlee Taylor (AUS)	Lotto–Soudal Ladies	+2' 18"
5	Tetyana Ryabchenko (UKR)	Inpa Sottoli Giusfredi	+2' 21"
6	Polona Batagelj (SLO)	BTC City Ljubljana	+2' 31"
7	Jenelle Crooks (AUS)	Australia	+2' 56"
8	Eugenia Bujak (POL)	BTC City Ljubljana	+3' 23"
9	Brianna Walle (USA)	Optum–KBS	+3' 38"
10	Jessie Daams (BEL)	Lotto–Soudal Ladies	+4' 11"
Source: ProCyclingStats
