= Špela Kern =

Slovenian cyclist

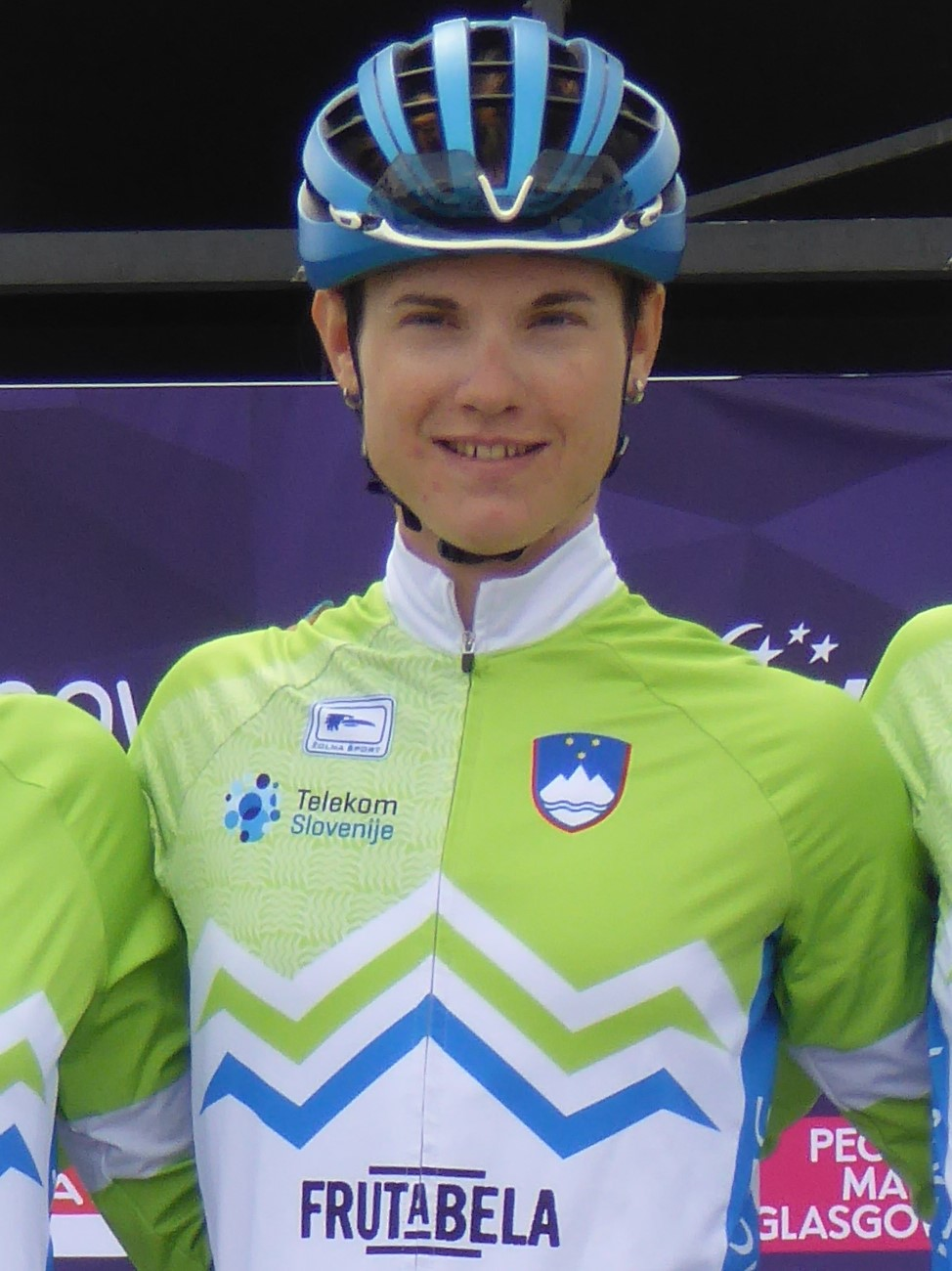
- Kern at the 2018 European Road Cycling Championships.

Personal information
- Full name: Špela Kern
- Born: 24 February 1990 (age 36)

Cycling career
- Sport: Cycling
- Current team: Cofidis
- Discipline: Road
- Role: Rider

Professional teams
- 2014–2016: BTC City Ljubljana
- 2017: Bizkaia–Durango
- 2018: Health Mate–Cyclelive Team
- 2019: BTC City Ljubljana
- 2020: Lviv Cycling Team
- 2021–2022: Massi–Tactic
- 2023–: Cofidis

Špela Kern (born 24 February 1990) is a Slovenian racing cyclist, who rides for UCI Women's Continental Team Cofidis. She has competed in the women's road race at the UCI Road World Championships seven times between 2013, and 2022.

== Major results ==
2013
National Road Championships

2nd Road race
4th Time trial

2014
National Road Championships

3rd Road race
5th Time trial

5th Giro dell'Emilia Internazionale Donne Elite
2015
3rd Road race, National Road Championships
7th Open de Suède Vårgårda TTT
2016
National Road Championships

3rd Road race
4th Time trial

2017
2nd Road race, National Road Championships
2018
National Road Championships

3rd Road race
5th Time trial

6th Road race, Mediterranean Games
2019
4th Time trial, National Road Championships
2020
2nd Road race, National Road Championships
2021
3rd Road race, National Road Championships
7th Overall Setmana Ciclista Valenciana
9th Overall Tour Cycliste Féminin International de l'Ardèche
2022
2nd Road race, National Road Championships
6th Alpes Gresivaudan Classic
10th Mont Ventoux Dénivelé Challenge
