= Urša Pintar =

Slovenian cyclist (born 1985)

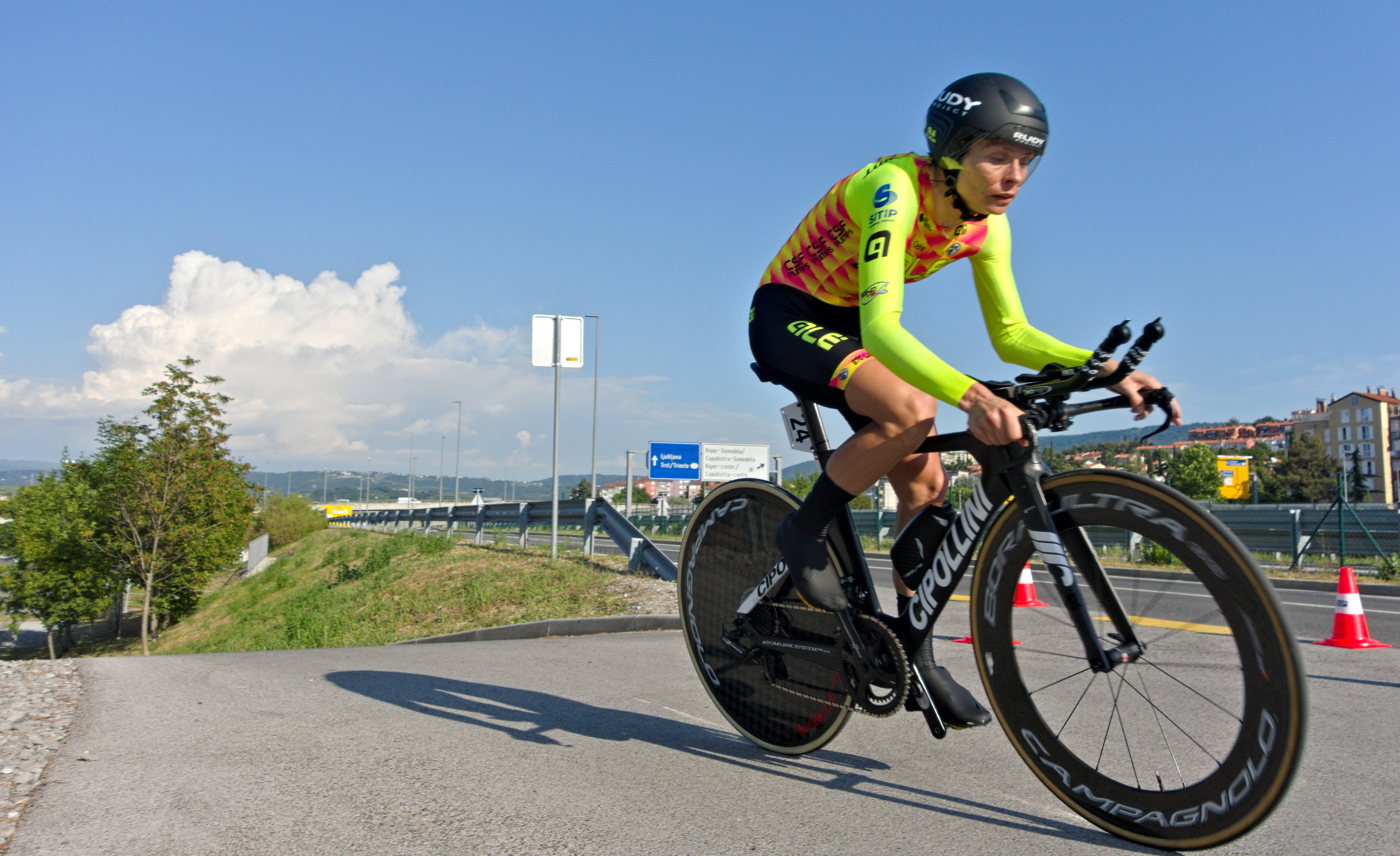
- Pintar at the 2021 Slovenian National Time Trial Championships

Personal information
- Full name: Urška Pintar
- Born: 3 October 1985 (age 41): Ljubljana, SFR Yugoslavia; (now Slovenia)
- Height: 1.69 m (5 ft 7 in)
- Weight: 56 kg (123 lb)

Cycling career
- Sport: Cycling
- Discipline: Road
- Role: Rider
- Rider type: Climber

Amateur team
- 2010–2013: Klub Polet Garmin

Professional teams
- 2014–2019: BTC City Ljubljana
- 2020–2021: Alé BTC Ljubljana
- 2022: UAE Team ADQ
- 2023: BTC City Ljubljana Scott
- 2024: BTC City Ljubljana Zhiraf Ambedo

Major wins
- One-day races and Classics National Time Trial Championships (2016, 2017) National Road Race Championships (2020)

Urša Pintar (born 3 October 1985), also known as Urška Pintar, is a Slovenian racing cyclist, who rides for UCI Women's WorldTeam Born to Win BTC City Ljubljana Zhiraf. She has competed in the women's road race, at the UCI Road World Championships, on ten occasions between 2012 and 2022.

== Major results ==
2010
National Road Championships

5th Time trial
6th Road race

2011
National Road Championships

2nd Road race
4th Time trial

2012
National Road Championships

2nd Time trial
3rd Road race

2013
3rd Road race, National Road Championships
2014
National Road Championships

2nd Road race
6th Time trial

7th Giro dell'Emilia Internazionale Donne Elite
2015
2nd Road race, National Road Championships
7th Crescent Women World Cup Vårgårda TTT
8th Team time trial, UCI Road World Championships
2016
National Road Championships

1st Time trial
2nd Road race

2017
National Road Championships

1st Time trial
4th Road race

5th Giro dell'Emilia Internazionale Donne Elite
7th Team time trial, UCI Road World Championships
2018
National Road Championships

2nd Time trial
2nd Road race

7th Giro dell'Emilia Internazionale Donne Elite
2019
National Road Championships

2nd Time trial
2nd Road race

4th Overall Vuelta a Burgos Feminas
6th Durango-Durango Emakumeen Saria
7th Mixed team relay, UCI Road World Championships
8th Grand Prix de Plumelec-Morbihan Dames
2020
1st Road race, National Road Championships
4th Giro dell'Emilia Internazionale Donne Elite
2021
National Road Championships

2nd Time trial
2nd Road race

10th Overall Tour de Feminin-O cenu Českého Švýcarska
2022
National Road Championships

3rd Time trial
3rd Road race

7th Time trial, Mediterranean Games
