= Johann Zhuber =

Carniolan physician (1790–1865)

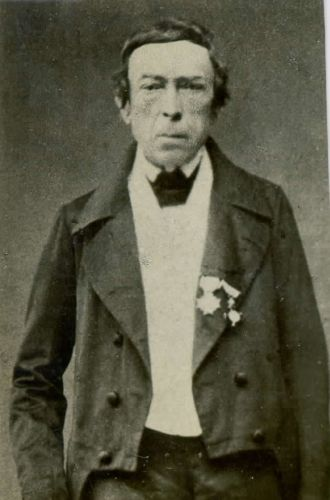
- Born: December 8, 1790; Gabrje, Habsburg Empire
- Died: February 26, 1865 (aged 74); Ljubljana, Austrian Empire
- Occupation: Physician

Johann Zhuber (surname also Tschuber, Slovenized: Ivan Čuber; December 8, 1790 – February 26, 1865) was a Carniolan medical doctor.

== Life and work ==
Zhuber was born in Gabrje, the son of Valentin and Apolonia Zhuber. He attended high school in Novo Mesto and Ljubljana (1801–1807), and he then studied philosophy in Zagreb until 1809. He began his medical studies at the central school in Ljubljana (1810/1811) and then continued in Vienna, where he received his doctorate in 1816 with the dissertation De phthisi pulmonali. At the Ljubljana civil hospital, he first worked as a volunteer, and then as an assistant to and the deputy of Anton Jeuniker. From 1819 he was a professor of theoretical and practical medicine, and from 1834 until the medical and surgical institute closed in 1851 he only taught practical medicine. In 1830, he became the head physician at the provincial general hospital and at the Ljubljana psychiatric hospital in Ajdovščina. In 1851, he was appointed director of the Ljubljana charities, and he retired in 1862. He was a member of the Carniolan Savings Bank (from 1828 onward), the Carniola Credit Society (from 1830 onward), the Poor Committee, the Philharmonic Society, the Historical Society, and the Vienna Medical Society. In 1843, he became a Ljubljana city councilman. He received several decorations: in 1835 he was awarded the Golden Cross of Merit with a crown, in 1837 he was awarded the Knight's Cross of the Saxon Order for civil services, in 1864 he became an honorary citizen of Ljubljana, and in 1865 he was ennobled with the predicate Okrog.

Zhuber was a good educator and a respected practical doctor. He won special renown in 1837, when he successfully treated the King of Saxony, Frederick Augustus II, who fell ill in Ljubljana while on a botanical excursion. His main merit was his persistent fight against the spread of homeopathy in Ljubljana and Carniola. In May 1848, he was one of the signatories of a memorandum requesting the establishment of a Slovenian medical college, but he resisted the request again in November of the same year, saying that there were already enough physicians in the province.
