= Luka Pibernik =

Slovenian cyclist (born 1993)

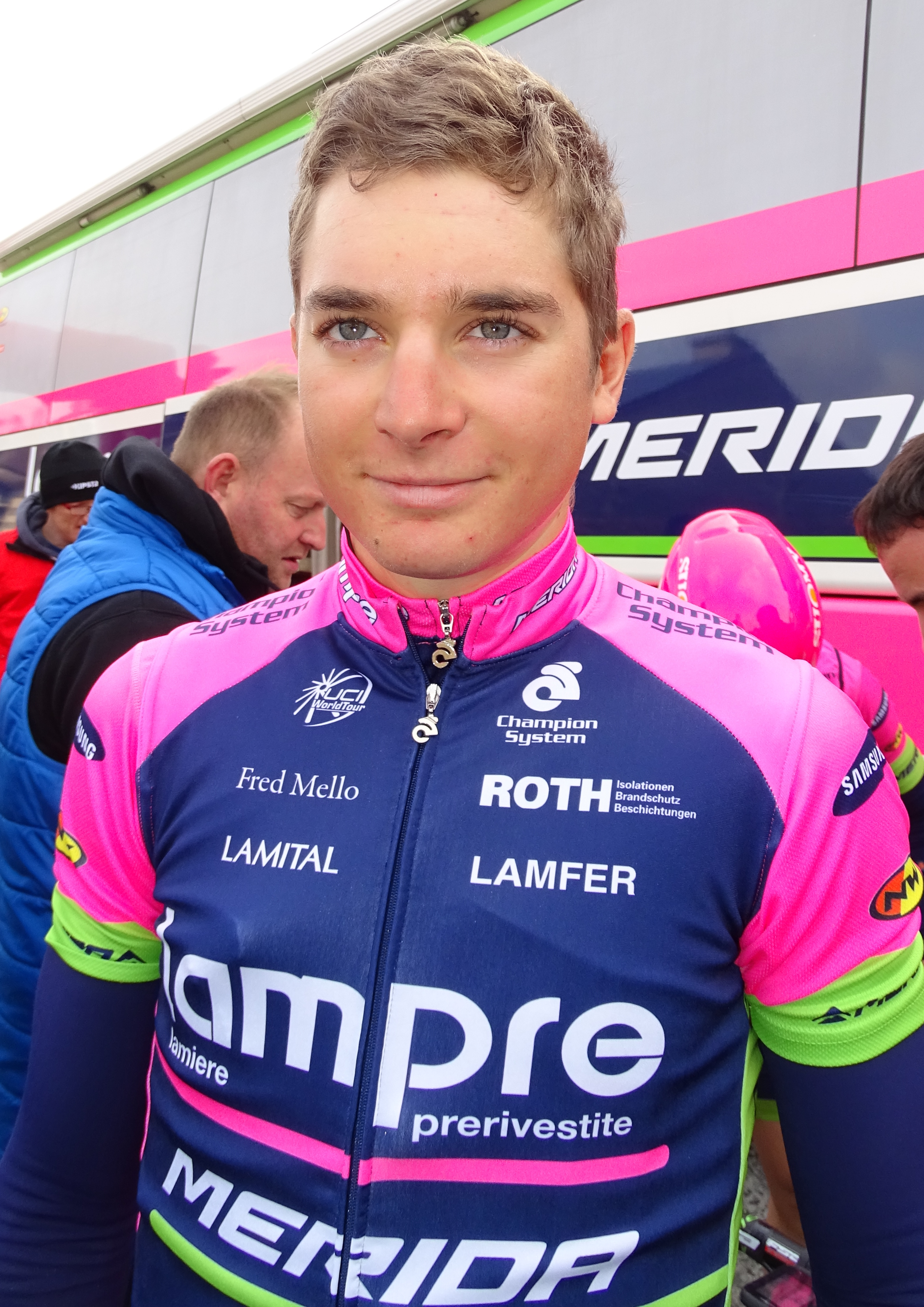
- Pibernik at the 2015 E3 Harelbeke

Personal information
- Full name: Luka Pibernik
- Born: 23 October 1993 (age 32) Ljubljana, Slovenia
- Height: 1.77 m (5 ft 10 in)
- Weight: 60 kg (132 lb)

Cycling career
- Sport: Cycling
- Current team: Pogi Team Gusto Ljubljana
- Discipline: Road
- Role: Rider (retired); Directeur sportif

Professional teams
- 2012–2014: Radenska
- 2015–2016: Lampre–Merida
- 2017–2020: Bahrain–Merida

Managerial team
- 2023–: Ljubljana Gusto Santic

Major wins
- One-day races and Classics National Road Race Championships (2013, 2015)

Luka Pibernik (born 23 October 1993) is a Slovenian former professional cyclist, who rode professionally between 2012 and 2020, for the Radenska, Lampre–Merida and Bahrain–McLaren teams. During his professional career, Pibernik took three victories – two wins at the Slovenian National Road Race Championships in 2013 and 2015, and a stage victory at the 2016 Eneco Tour.

He now works as a directeur sportif for UCI Continental team Pogi Team Gusto Ljubljana.

== Major results ==
2011
2nd Road race, National Junior Road Championships
2012
3rd Road race, National Road Championships
5th Road race, UCI Under-23 Road World Championships
6th Trofeo Internazionale Bastianelli
7th Overall Czech Cycling Tour
2013
1st Road race, National Road Championships
1st Stage 2 Czech Cycling Tour
3rd Overall Peace Race U23

1st Points classification

3rd Gran Premio Palio del Recioto
3rd Grand Prix Královéhradeckého kraje
4th Gran Premio di Poggiana
8th Trofeo Internazionale Bastianelli
8th Trofej Umag
8th Ronde van Vlaanderen Beloften
2014
3rd Time trial, National Under-23 Road Championships
4th Giro del Belvedere
4th GP Hungary
7th GP Czech Republic
7th Gran Premio Palio del Recioto
7th Raiffeisen Grand Prix
8th Gran Premio della Costa Etruschi
8th Gran Premio di Poggiana
8th Gran Premio della Liberazione
9th Grand Prix Královéhradeckého kraje
10th Overall Peace Race U23
2015
1st Road race, National Road Championships
2016
1st Stage 6 Eneco Tour
4th Road race, National Road Championships
2018
3rd Road race, National Road Championships

=== Grand Tour general classification results timeline ===
Grand Tour	2016	2017	2018	2019
Giro d'Italia	—	100	—	—
Tour de France	102	—	—	—
Vuelta a España	—	—	142	109

Legend
—	Did not compete
DNF	Did not finish
