= Ambrož pod Krvavcem =

Ambrož pod Krvavcem Sveti Ambrož (until 1955)
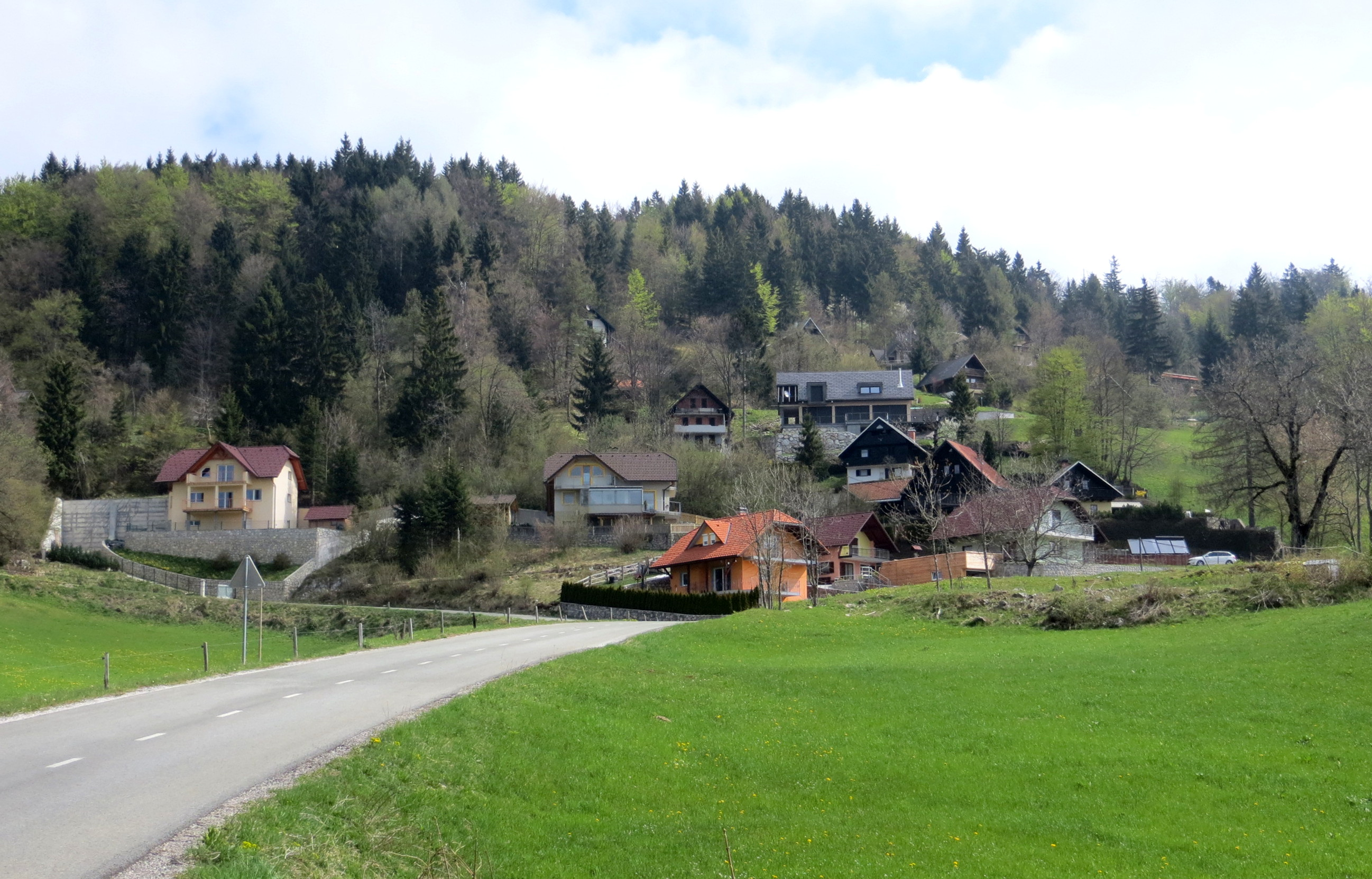

- Location in Slovenia
- Coordinates: 46°16′31.56″N 14°31′40.2″E
- Country: Slovenia
- Traditional Region: Upper Carniola
- Statistical region: Upper Carniola
- Municipality: Cerklje na Gorenjskem
- Elevation: 1,078.8 m (3,539 ft)

Population (2020)
  - Total: 134

Ambrož pod Krvavcem (pronounced [amˈbɾoːʃ pɔt kəɾˈʋaːu̯tsɛm]; German: Sankt Ambrosi) is a high-elevation village in the Municipality of Cerklje na Gorenjskem in the Upper Carniola region of Slovenia.

== Geography ==
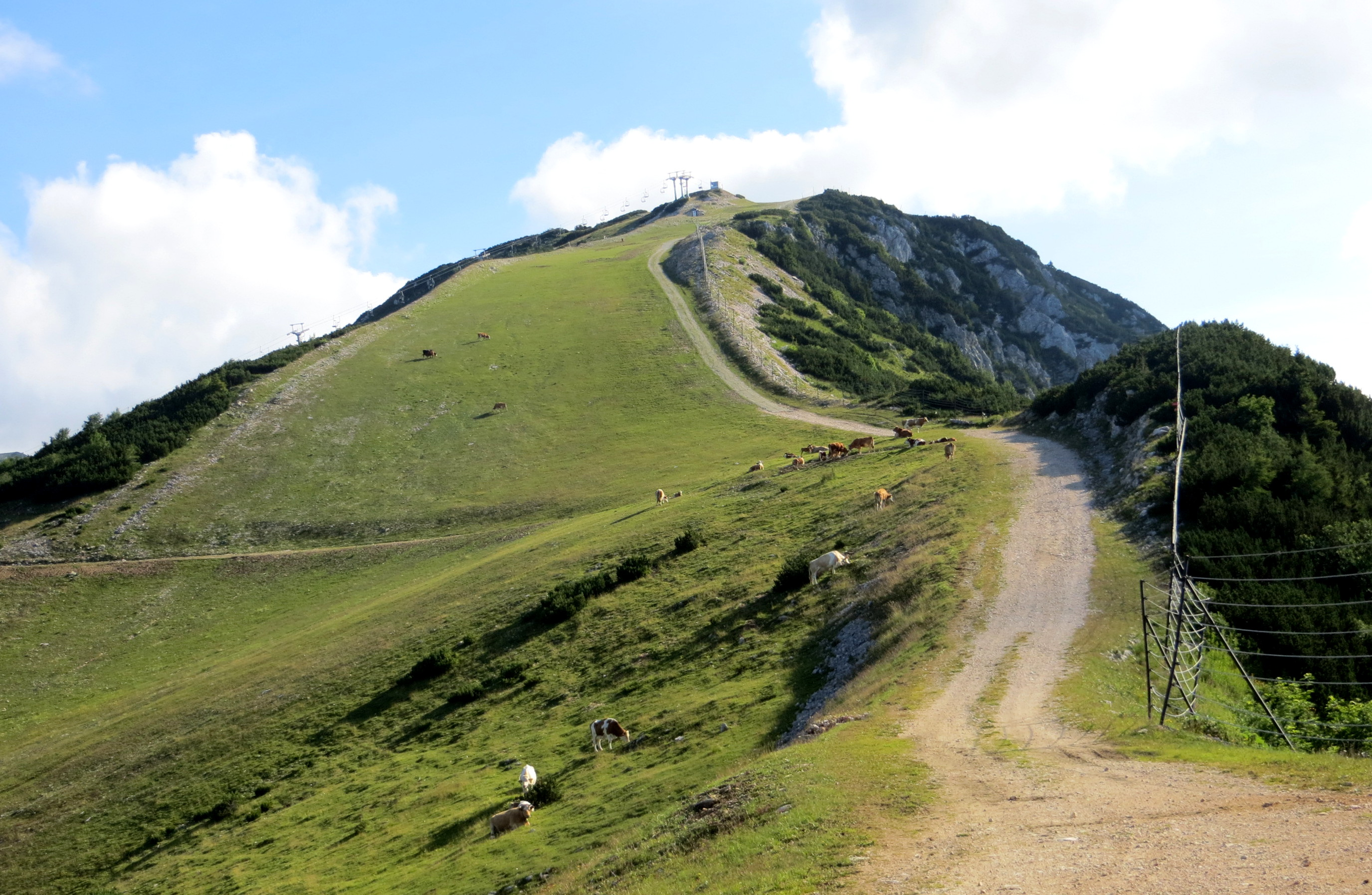
Big Mount Zvoh (Veliki Zvoh)

Ambrož pod Krvavcem is a scattered settlement on the southern slope of Mount Krvavec (1,853 meters or 6,079 feet). The church stands at the highest point in the settlement itself, at 1,085 meters (3,560 ft), and the territory of the village extends further north, reaching its highest elevation at Big Mount Zvoh (Slovene: Veliki Zvoh; 1,971 meters or 6,467 feet) above the Jezerca and Križ pastures. Farms are located on terraces at lower elevations, extending west to Stiška Vas and east to Sveti Lenart.

== Name ==
Ambrož pod Krvavcem was attested in historical sources as S. Ambrosen perg in 1496 and St. Ambrosi in 1499. The name of the settlement was changed from Sveti Ambrož (literally, 'Saint Ambrose') to Ambrož pod Krvavcem (literally, 'Ambrose below Mount Krvavec') in 1955. The name was changed on the basis of the 1948 Law on Names of Settlements and Designations of Squares, Streets, and Buildings as part of efforts by Slovenia's postwar communist government to remove religious elements from toponyms. In the past the German name was Sankt Ambrosi.

== Church ==
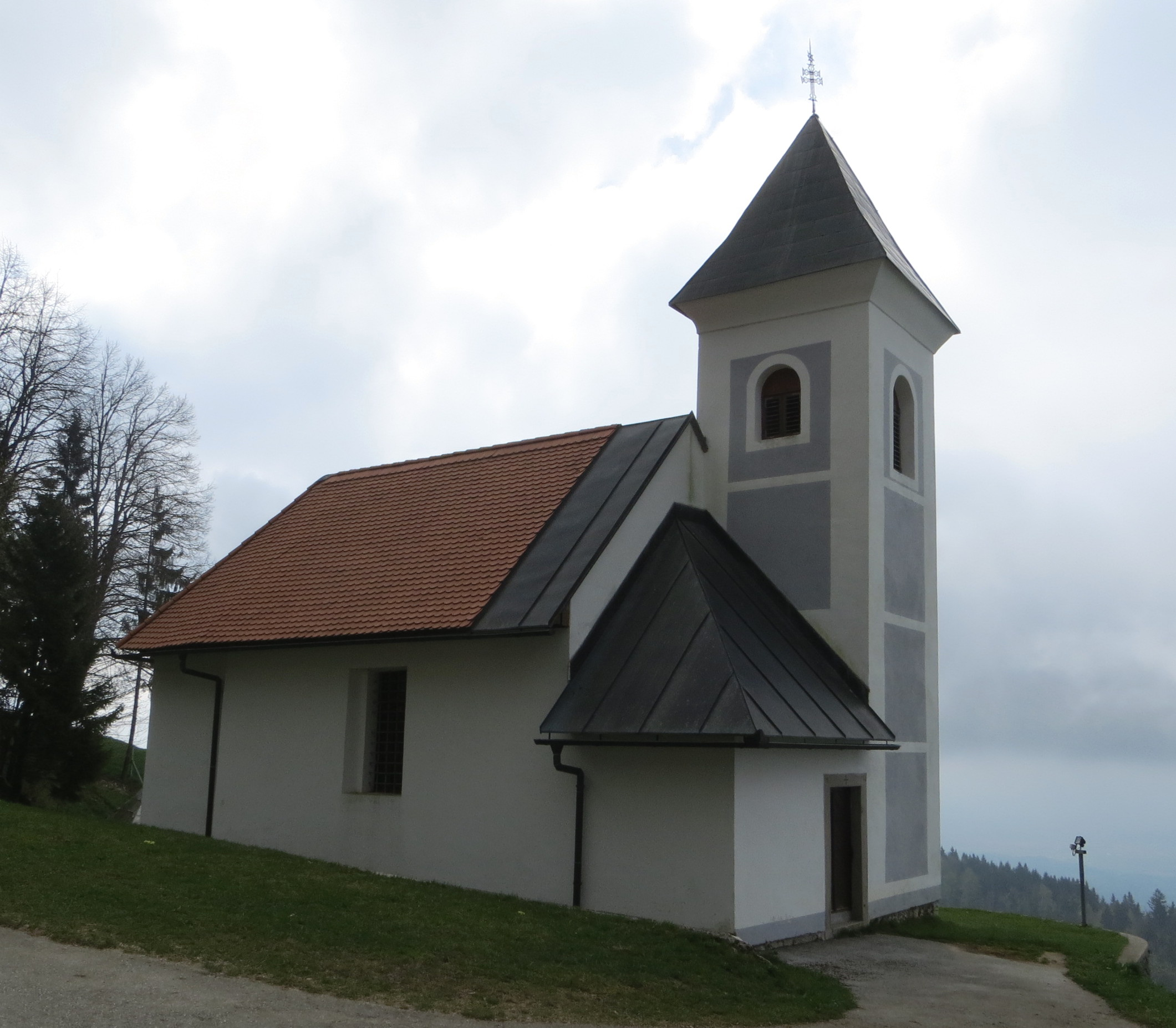
Saint Ambrose's Church

The local church is dedicated to Saint Ambrose, thus also the village's name. The church is said to have been damaged in 1471 during an Ottoman raid, when the Cerklje Basin was also burned by Ottoman forces. According to oral tradition, Ottoman horseshoes were later widely found in the area.
