= Anja Longyka =

Slovenian cyclist

Personal information
- Born: 21 June 1993 (age 33)

Cycling career
- Sport: Cycling
- Discipline: Road
- Role: Rider

Professional team
- 2019: BTC City Ljubljana

Anja Longyka (born 21 June 1993) is a Slovenian professional racing cyclist. She rode for the UCI Women's Team BTC City Ljubljana during the 2019 women's road cycling season.
