= Blaž Furdi =

Slovenian bicycle racer

Personal information
- Full name: Blaž Furdi
- Born: 27 May 1988 (age 38)

Cycling career
- Sport: Cycling
- Current team: Retired
- Discipline: Road
- Role: Rider

Professional teams
- 2007: Adria Mobil
- 2008–2010: Sava
- 2011: Adria Mobil
- 2012: Tirol Cycling Team
- 2014: Meridiana–Kamen

Blaž Furdi (born 27 May 1988) is a Slovenian former professional cyclist.

== Major results ==
2008
3rd Trofeo Città di San Vendemiano
3rd Gara Ciclistica Montappone
2010
1st Road race, National Under-23 Road Championships
1st Gran Premio Palio del Recioto
2nd Overall Istrian Spring Trophy

1st Stage 1

3rd Road race, National Road Championships
2011
2nd Raiffeisen Grand Prix
2nd Memoriał Henryka Łasaka
2nd Road race, National Road Championships
2012
~~2nd Tartu GP~~
~~3rd Tallinn-Tartu GP~~
3rd Trofeo Zsšdi
