= Roman Ermakov =

Russian cyclist

Personal information
- Born: 6 October 2004 (age 22) Vyborg, Russia

Cycling career
- Sport: Cycling
- Current team: Team Bahrain Victorious
- Discipline: Road
- Role: Rider

Amateur teams
- 2022: Cannibal Team
- 2023: mebloJOGI Pro-concrete

Professional teams
- 2023–2024: CTF Victorious
- 2025–: Team Bahrain Victorious

Major wins
- One-day races and Classics National Road Race Championships (2026)

Roman Ermakov (born 6 October 2004) is a Russian-Slovenian cyclist, who currently rides for UCI WorldTeam Team Bahrain Victorious.

== Major results ==
2022
1st Overall Aubel–Thimister–Stavelot

1st Mountains classification

1st Route des Géants
3rd Overall Watersley Junior Challenge
3rd Overall Junioren Rundfahrt
2023
5th GP Kranj
2024
1st Ruota d'Oro
1st GP Kranj
1st Kriterij in nočni kriterij Kranj
1st Trofeo Rezzesi Memorial R.Amantini
2026 (1 pro win)
National Road Championships

1st Road race
2nd Time trial
