= Urška Bravec =

Slovenian cyclist (born 1996)

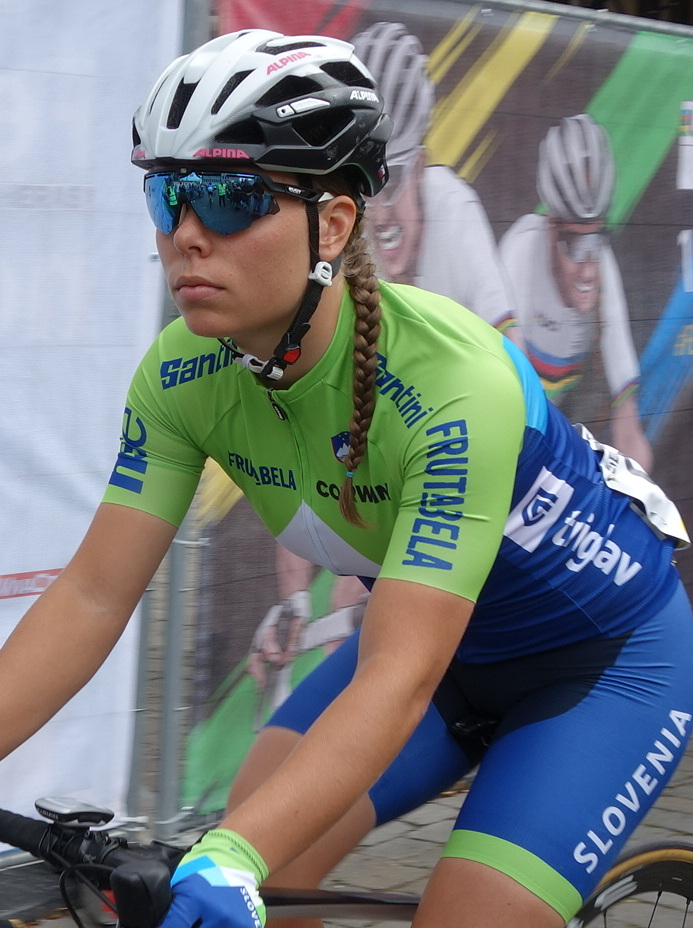
- Bravec at the 2021 World Championships

Personal information
- Born: 14 December 1996 (age 29)

Cycling career
- Sport: Cycling
- Discipline: Road
- Role: Rider

Professional teams
- 2018–2019: BTC City Ljubljana
- 2020: Alé BTC Ljubljana
- 2022: BTC City Ljubljana Scott

Urška Bravec (born 14 December 1996) is a Slovenian racing cyclist, who most recently rode for UCI Women's Continental Team BTC City Ljubljana Scott.
