= Gorazd Štangelj =

Slovenian cyclist

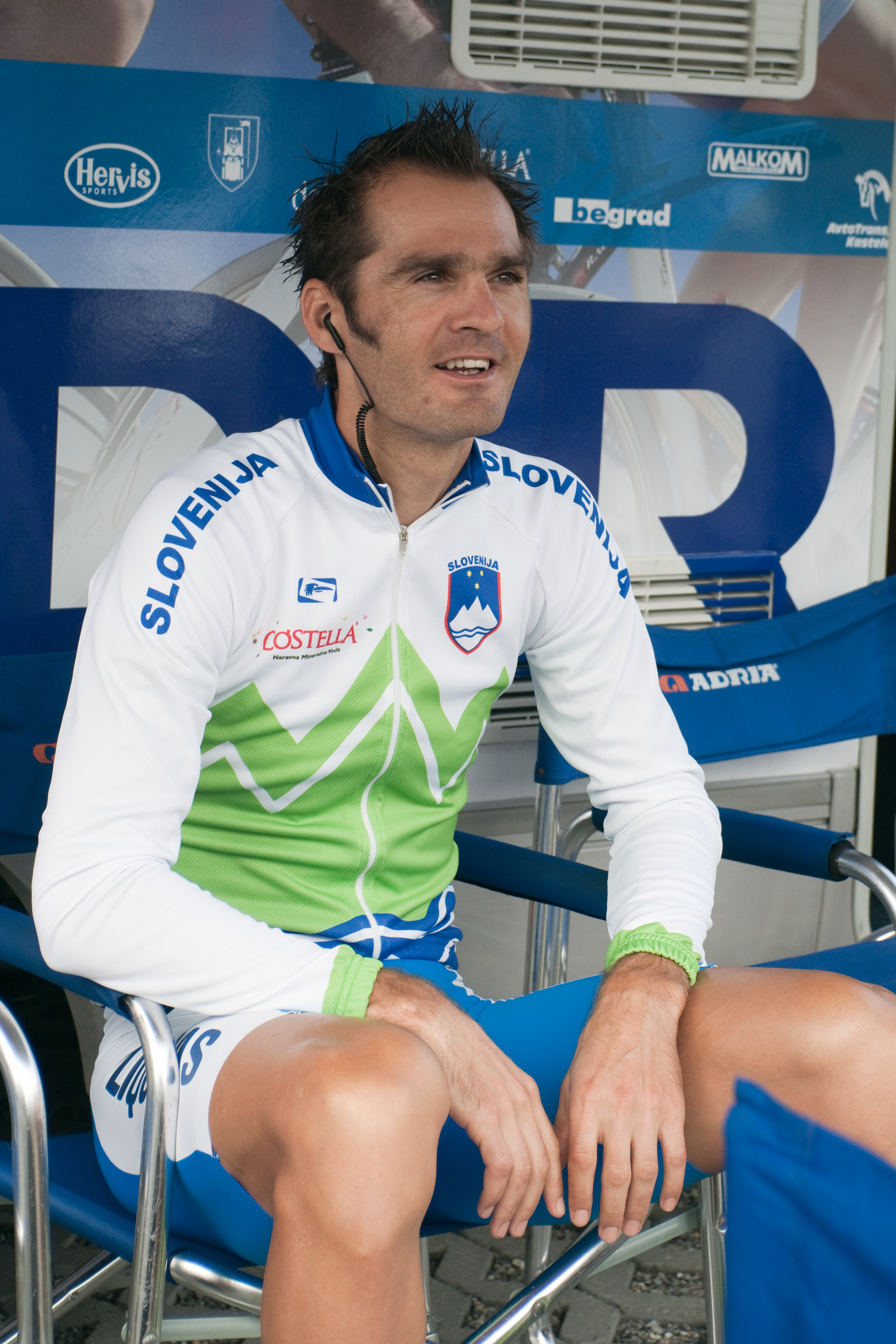

Personal information
- Full name: Gorazd Štangelj
- Born: 27 January 1973 (age 53) Novo Mesto, SR Slovenia, Yugoslavia
- Height: 1.82 m (6 ft 0 in)
- Weight: 68 kg (150 lb)

Cycling career
- Sport: Cycling
- Current team: Team Bahrain Victorious
- Discipline: Road
- Role: Rider (retired); Directeur sportif

Professional teams
- 1997–1998: KRKA–Telekom Slovenije
- 1999: Mobilvetta–Northwave
- 2000–2001: Liquigas–Pata
- 2002–2003: Fassa Bortolo
- 2004: Saeco
- 2005–2008: Lampre–Caffita
- 2009: Liquigas
- 2010–2011: Astana

Managerial teams
- 2012–2016: Astana
- 2017–: Bahrain–Merida

Gorazd Štangelj (born 27 January 1973 in Novo Mesto) is a Slovenian former professional road bicycle racer, who raced as a professional between 1997 and 2011. He currently works as a directeur sportif for UCI WorldTeam Team Bahrain Victorious.

== Major results ==
1991
1st Overall Tour de l'Abitibi
1993
3rd Overall Tour de Slovénie

1st Stage 1 (ITT)

1994
1st GP Kranj
1st Stage 2 Giro delle Regioni
1995
3rd Overall Tour de Normandie
1996
1st Giro del Belvedere
2nd Trofeo Banca Popolare di Vicenza
1997
3rd Road race, National Road Championships
5th GP Kranj
1998
1st Overall GP Kranj

1st Stage 2

1st Stage 5 Niedersachsen-Rundfahrt
2nd Road race, National Road Championships
2nd Overall Tour de Slovénie
3rd Overall Course Cycliste de Solidarnosc et des Champions Olympiques

1st Stage 2

3rd Grand Prix Herning
5th GP Aarhus
8th Gran Premio Bruno Beghelli
1999
1st Overall Commonwealth Bank Classic
3rd GP du canton d'Argovie
2000
~~1st Road race, National Road Championships~~
1st Trofeo Melinda
4th Overall Tour of Austria

1st Stage 2b

5th Overall Grand Prix du Midi Libre

1st Stage 5

5th Paris–Tours
6th Giro del Lazio
6th Giro dell'Emilia
7th Giro della Provincia di Lucca
9th Giro di Lombardia
2001
1st Giro di Toscana
8th Giro della Provincia di Siracusa
9th Trofeo Melinda
9th Giro del Friuli
10th Veenendaal–Veenendaal
10th GP Industria & Commercio di Prato
2002
10th Giro del Friuli
2003
5th Coppa Sabatini
2005
7th Giro di Lombardia
2006
10th Overall Tour de Slovénie
2007
1st Stage 1 (TTT) Tour de Pologne
10th Gran Premio Bruno Beghelli
2008
1st Stage 1 (TTT) Vuelta a España
2009
4th Tre Valli Varesine
10th Overall Tour de Slovénie
2010
1st Road race, National Road Championships
2011
4th Road race, National Road Championships
10th Giro del Friuli

=== Grand Tour general classification results timeline ===
Grand Tour	1999	2000	2001	2002	2003	2004	2005	2006	2007	2008	2009	2010	2011
Giro d'Italia	DNF	—	72	DNF	—	94	67	59	78	—	96	92	86
Tour de France	—	—	—	—	—	—	87	—	—	—	—	—	—
Vuelta a España	—	—	—	74	—	—	—	—	—	109	—	—	—
