= Ihan =

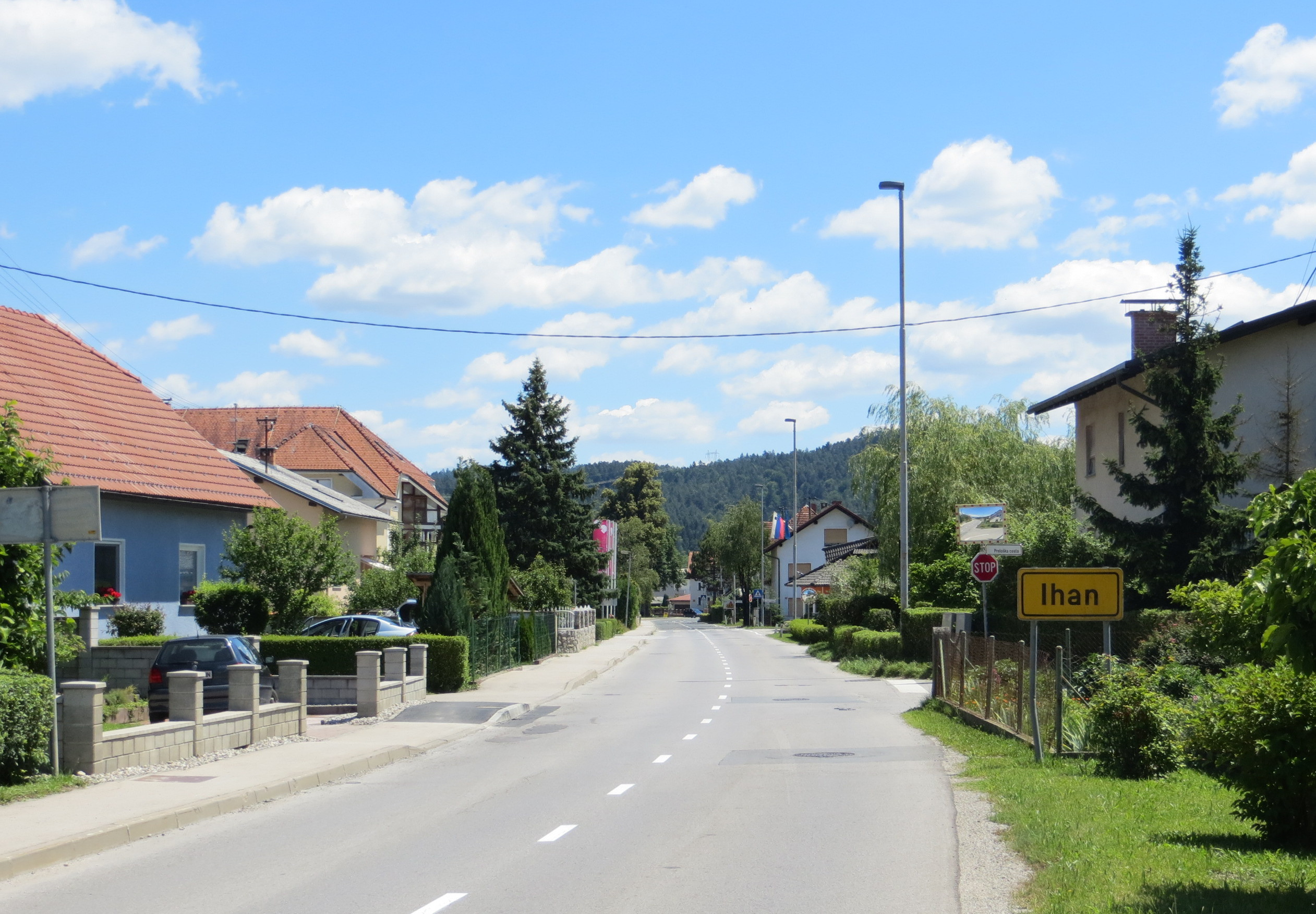

- Location in Slovenia
- Coordinates: 46°7′14.32″N 14°36′56.57″E
- Country: Slovenia
- Traditional region: Upper Carniola
- Statistical region: Central Slovenia
- Municipality: Domžale
- Elevation: 286.7 m (941 ft)

Population (2020)
  - Total: 852

Ihan (pronounced [iˈxan]; German: Jauchen) is a settlement in the Municipality of Domžale in the Upper Carniola region of Slovenia. The settlement used to be part of the Krumperk lordship. Today it is known for its pig farm, which is the largest in Slovenia.

== Name ==
Ihan was attested in written records in 1228 as Uichan (and as Iouchan in 1296, Jowchan in 1330, Jawchan in 1347, and Yawch in 1458). The Slovene name was originally *Juhan, as indicated by the German attestations. The toponym is likely derived from a Slavic personal name such as *Vojuxanъ and unrelated to the German name Johann. In the past the German name was Jauchen.

== Church ==
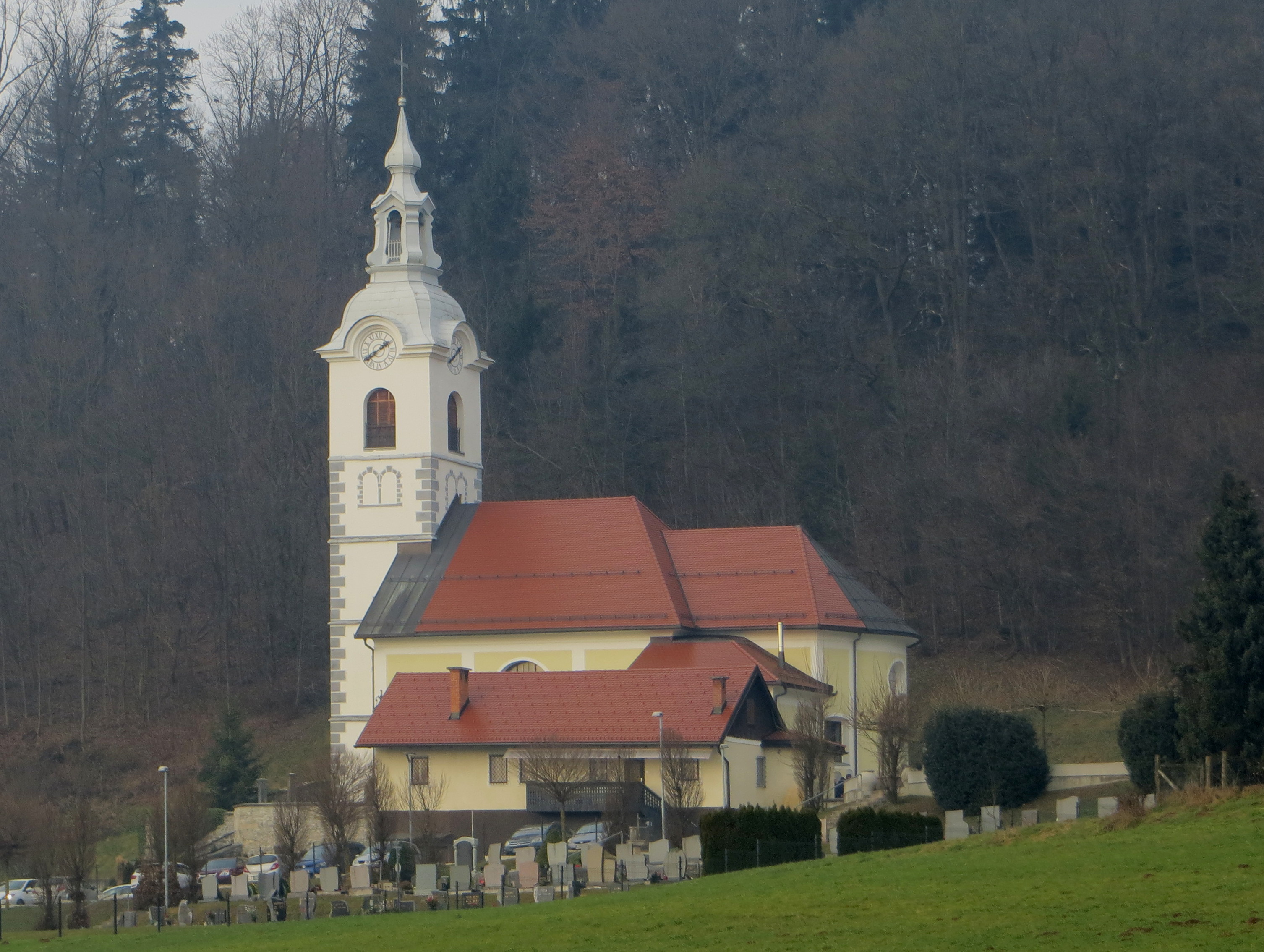
Saint George's Church

The parish church in Ihan stands in the northeast part of the village. It is dedicated to Saint George. There is a cemetery next to the church.

== Notable people ==
Notable people that were born or lived in Ihan include:

- Anton Breznik (1881–1944), linguist and grammarian
- Mihael Kavka (1809–1873), painter
- Bogdan Jordan (1917–1942), geographer
- Ivan Pengov (1879–1932), sculptor
