= Polona Batagelj =

Slovenian road bicycle racer

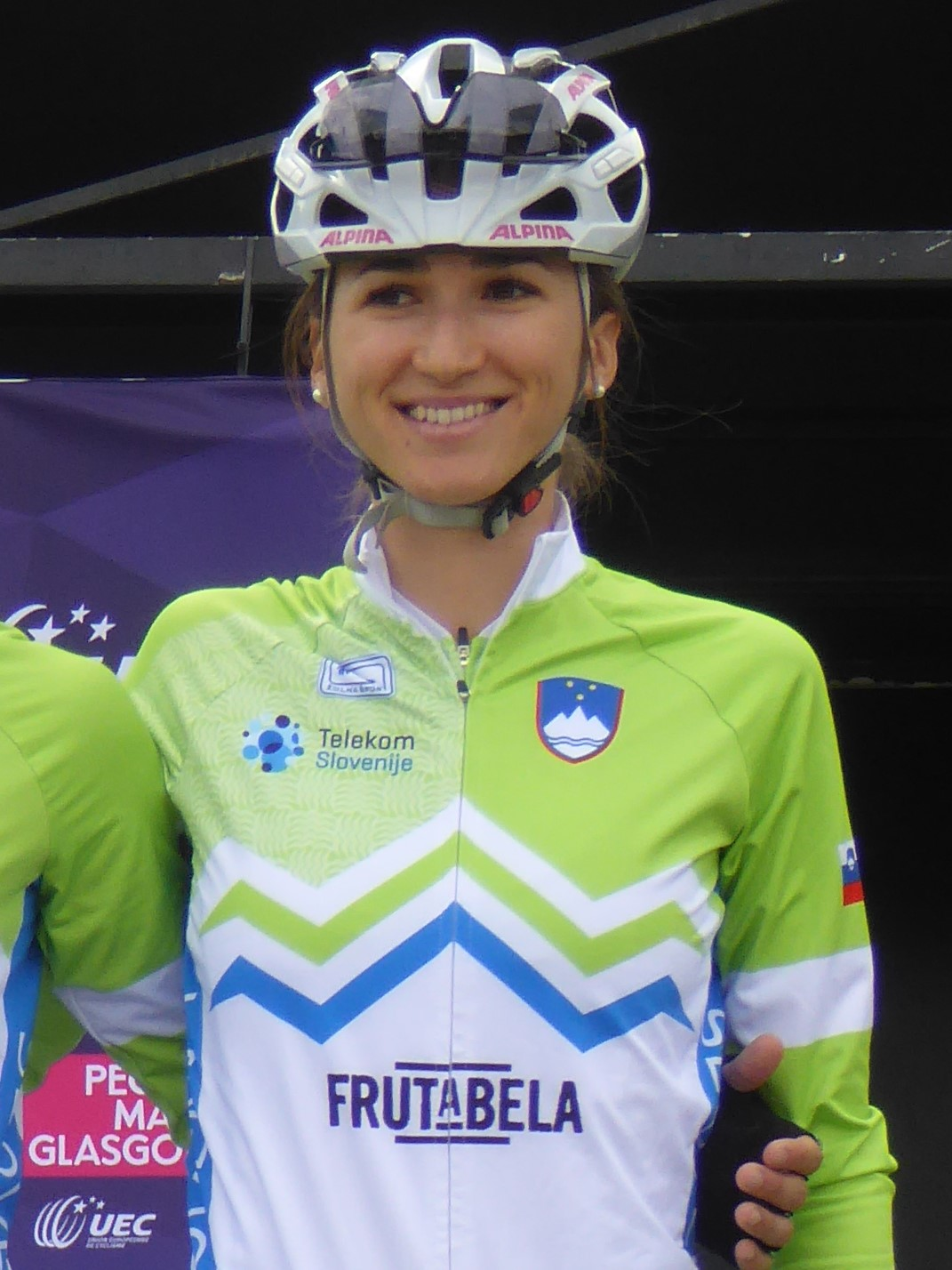
- Batagelj at the 2018 European Road Cycling Championships.

Personal information
- Full name: Polona Batagelj
- Born: 7 June 1989 (age 37): Šempeter pri Gorici, SFR Yugoslavia; (now Slovenia)

Cycling career
- Sport: Cycling
- Current team: Retired
- Discipline: Road
- Role: Rider; Directeur sportif

Professional teams
- 2010–2011: Bizkaia–Durango
- 2012: Diadora–Pasta Zara
- 2013: Bizkaia–Durango
- 2014–2018: BTC City Ljubljana

Managerial team
- 2019: BTC City Ljubljana (directeur sportif)

Polona Batagelj (born 7 June 1989) is a Slovenian former road bicycle racer, who rode professionally between 2010 and 2018 for the Diadora–Pasta Zara, Bizkaia–Durango (two spells) and BTC City Ljubljana squads. She most recently worked as a directeur sportif for her final professional team, UCI Women's Team BTC City Ljubljana. She won the Slovenian National Road Race Championships nine times, successively between 2010 and 2018.

She competed at the 2012 Summer Olympics in the Women's road race, (Note: "Polona Batagelj". London 2012. The London Organising Committee of the Olympic Games and Paralympic Games Limited.) finishing 22nd. At the 2016 Olympics, she finished in 32nd in the women's road race. She was on the start list for 2018 European Road Cycling Championships and finished 27th.

== Personal life ==
In 2020, Batagelj completed her Doctor of Philosophy degree (PhD) in Law at the Nova univerza, having previously completed Bachelor of Arts (BA) and Master of Arts (MA) degrees at the European Faculty of Law.

== Major results ==
2009
National Road Championships

2nd Time trial
3rd Road race

2010
National Road Championships

1st Road race
3rd Time trial

2011
National Road Championships

1st Road race
2nd Time trial

7th Overall Giro della Toscana Int. Femminile – Memorial Michela Fanini
8th Overall Iurreta-Emakumeen Bira
8th Overall Giro del Trentino Alto Adige-Südtirol
8th Durango-Durango Emakumeen Saria
2012
1st Road race, National Road Championships
2013
National Road Championships

1st Road race
2nd Time trial

2014
National Road Championships

1st Road race
1st Time trial

2015
National Road Championships

1st Road race
1st Time trial

3rd Overall Auensteiner–Radsporttage
6th Overall La Route de France
7th Overall Gracia–Orlová
2016
1st Road race, National Road Championships
9th SwissEver GP Cham-Hagendorn
9th La Classique Morbihan
2017
National Road Championships

1st Road race
2nd Time trial

4th Giro dell'Emilia Internazionale Donne Elite
10th Winston-Salem Cycling Classic
10th GP de Plouay – Bretagne
2018
National Road Championships

1st Road race
3rd Time trial

9th Giro dell'Emilia Internazionale Donne Elite
10th Overall Madrid Challenge by La Vuelta
