= Gabrje, Novo Mesto =

Gabrje
- Village
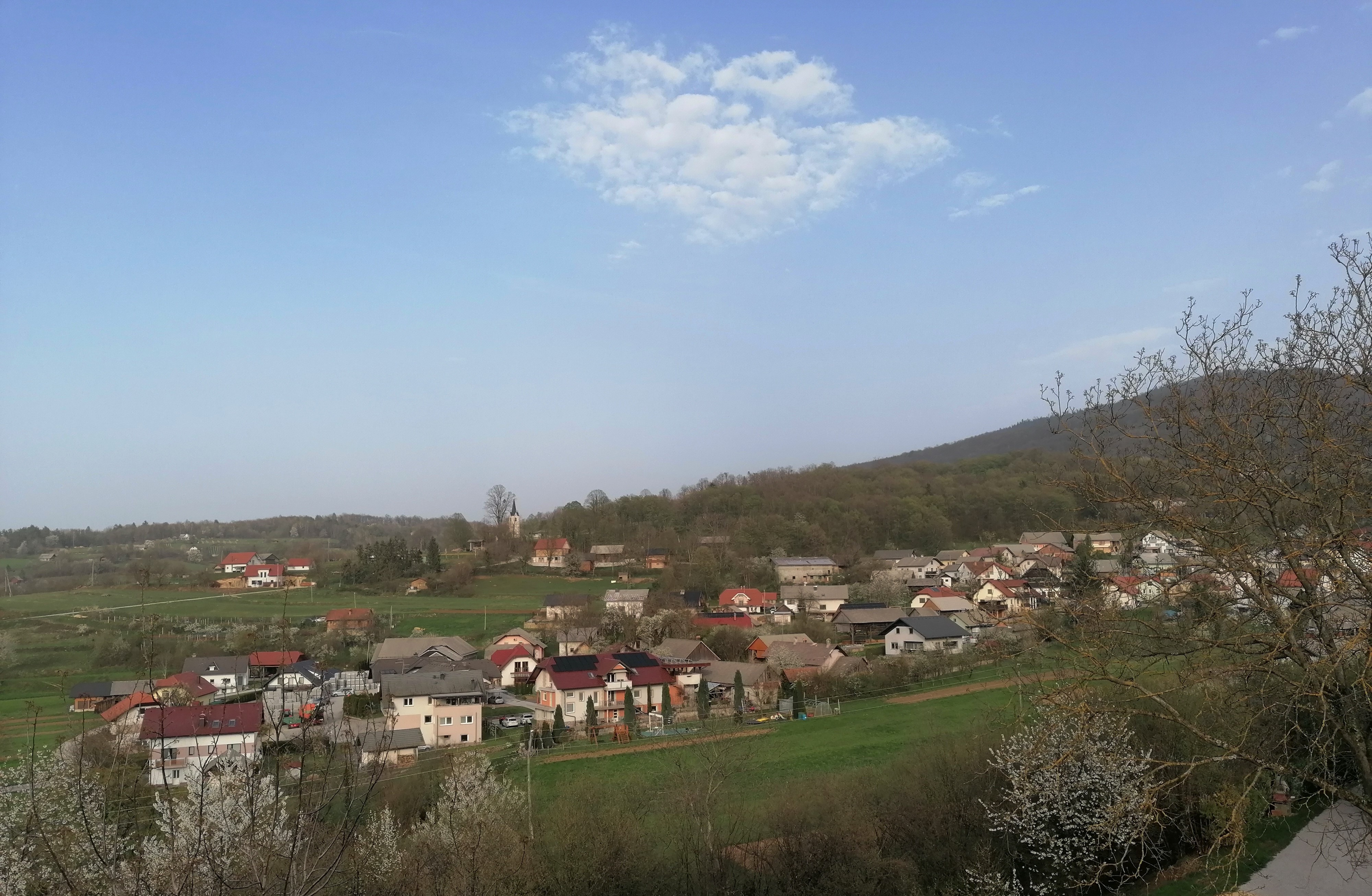

- Location in Slovenia
- Coordinates: 45°46′42.01″N 15°15′55.55″E
- Country: Slovenia
- Traditional region: Lower Carniola
- Statistical region: Southeast Slovenia
- Municipality: Novo Mesto

Area
  - Total: 10.335 km^{2} (3.990 sq mi)
- Elevation: 390.6 m (1,281 ft)

Population (2026)
  - Total: 641
  - Density: 62/km^{2} (160/sq mi)
- Postal code: 8321

Gabrje (pronounced [ˈɡaːbərjɛ]) is a village in the foothills of the Gorjanci Range in the City Municipality of Novo Mesto in southeastern Slovenia, close to the border with Croatia. The entire area is part of the traditional region of Lower Carniola and is now included in the Southeast Slovenia Statistical Region. In January 2026, the population was 641.

== Church ==
The local church is dedicated to John the Baptist and belongs to the Parish of Brusnice. It was built in the late 15th to early 16th centuries. Its three gilded altars date to the 17th century.

== Notable people ==
Notable people that were born or lived in Gabrje include the following:

- Johann Zhuber (1790–1865), physician
