= Eugenia Bujak =

Polish cyclist (born 1989)

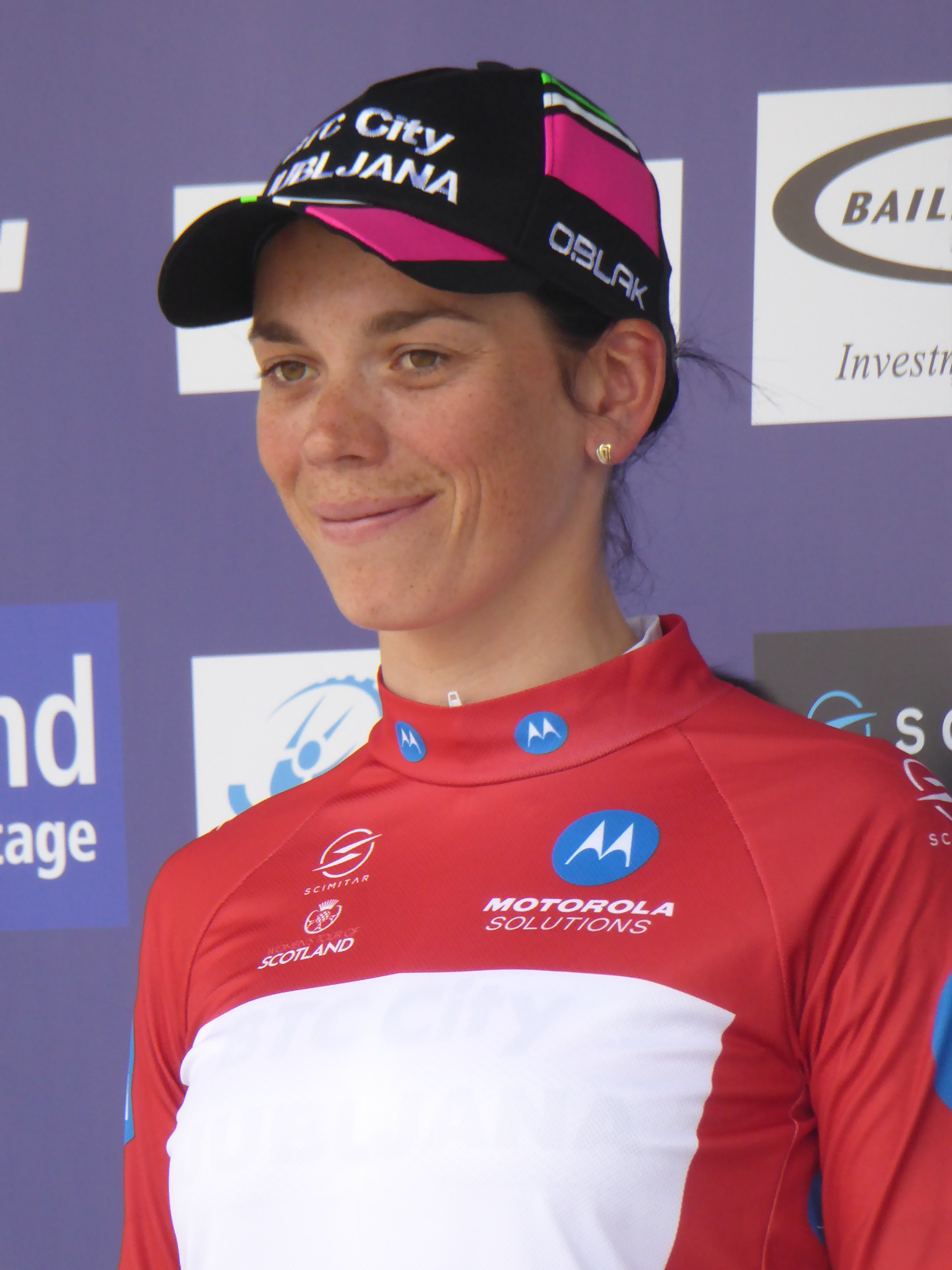
- Bujak at the 2019 Women's Tour of Scotland

Personal information
- Full name: Eugenia Bujak
- Born: 25 June 1989 (age 37): Lentvaris, Lithuanian SSR, Soviet Union; (now Lithuania)

Cycling career
- Sport: Cycling
- Current team: Cofidis
- Disciplines: Road; Track
- Role: Rider

Professional teams
- 2014–2019: BTC City Ljubljana
- 2020–2024: Alé BTC Ljubljana
- 2025–: Cofidis

Major wins
- One-day races and Classics GP de Plouay (2016) Polish National Road Race Championships (2013) Polish National Time Trial Championships (2014, 2015) Slovenian National Road Race Championships (2019, 2021, 2022) Slovenian National Time Trial Championships (2018, 2019, 2021)
Medal record
Representing Poland
Women's track cycling
European Championships
Gold medal – first place	2014 Baie-Mahault	Points race
Silver medal – second place	2012 Panevėžys	Team pursuit
Silver medal – second place	2013 Apeldoorn	Team pursuit
Representing Slovenia
Women's road cycling
Mediterranean Games
Silver medal – second place	2022 Oran	Time trial

Eugenia Bujak (born 25 June 1989) is a racing cyclist, who rides for UCI Women's ProTeam Cofidis.

== Career ==
She competed in the 2013 UCI women's road race in Florence for Poland, and has represented Slovenia in competition since 2018. Since turning professional, Bujak has taken thirteen victories, including the GP de Plouay in 2016 and nine national road titles – three in Poland and six in Slovenia.

== Major results ==
2012
3rd Time trial, Polish National Road Championships (Note: Up until 2018, Bujak rode under Polish nationality; for the 2018 season, she switched to Slovenian nationality.)
2013
Polish National Road Championships

1st Road race
2nd Time trial

Grand Prix Vienna

1st Individual pursuit
1st Points race
1st Scratch
2nd Sprint
2nd Team sprint (with Natalia Rutkowska)
2nd 500m time trial

2014
1st Points race, UEC European Track Championships
1st Time trial, Polish National Road Championships
Panevėžys

1st Individual pursuit
2nd Scratch

2nd GP du Canton d'Argovie
3rd Overall Gracia-Orlová
3rd Winston-Salem Cycling Classic
Grand Prix Galichyna

3rd Individual pursuit
3rd 500m time trial

4th Overall Giro della Toscana Int. Femminile – Memorial Michela Fanini
4th Nagrada Ljubljane TT
4th Giro del Trentino Alto Adige-Südtirol
2015
1st Time trial, Polish National Road Championships
3rd Overall Gracia–Orlová
6th La Madrid Challenge by La Vuelta
8th Overall La Route de France
European Games

9th Road race
9th Time trial

9th Ronde van Gelderland
9th Ljubljana–Domžale–Ljubljana TT
10th Overall Thüringen Rundfahrt der Frauen

1st Stage 2

2016
1st GP de Plouay – Bretagne
3rd Overall La Route de France

1st Stages 1 & 6

4th La Classique Morbihan
5th Omloop van Borsele
6th Ljubljana–Domžale–Ljubljana TT
7th Ronde van Gelderland
8th Madrid Challenge by La Vuelta
9th Grand Prix de Plumelec-Morbihan Dames
10th Overall Tour of Chongming Island
2017
1st Sprints classification, Thüringen Rundfahrt der Frauen
2nd Overall Grand Prix Elsy Jacobs
2nd Omloop van Borsele
2nd Ljubljana–Domžale–Ljubljana TT
4th GP de Plouay – Bretagne
4th Madrid Challenge by La Vuelta
6th Time trial, UEC European Road Championships
7th Overall Belgium Tour
7th Trofeo Alfredo Binda-Comune di Cittiglio
7th Winston-Salem Cycling Classic
8th Tour of Guangxi
2018
1st Time trial, Slovenian National Road Championships
3rd Ljubljana–Domžale–Ljubljana TT
4th Dwars door Vlaanderen
6th Overall BeNe Ladies Tour
7th Time trial, UEC European Road Championships
7th Overall Festival Elsy Jacobs
7th Overall Thüringen Rundfahrt der Frauen
7th Overall The Women's Tour
7th Overall Holland Ladies Tour
7th Chrono des Nations
9th Amstel Gold Race
9th GP de Plouay – Bretagne
10th Postnord UCI WWT Vårgårda WestSweden road race
2019
Slovenian National Road Championships

1st Time trial
1st Road race

4th Overall Women's Tour of Scotland
5th Overall Madrid Challenge by la Vuelta
5th Chrono Champenois
European Games

6th Time trial
10th Road race

7th Ljubljana–Domžale–Ljubljana TT
7th Giro dell'Emilia Internazionale Donne Elite
2020
4th Road race, Slovenian National Road Championships
7th Omloop Het Nieuwsblad
2021
Slovenian National Road Championships

1st Time trial
1st Road race

4th La Classique Morbihan
6th GP de Plouay
8th Dwars door Vlaanderen
2022
Slovenian National Road Championships

1st Road race
2nd Time trial

Mediterranean Games

2nd Time trial
8th Road race

2023
Slovenian National Road Championships

4th Road race
4th Time trial

4th Women Cycling Pro Costa De Almería
5th Overall Baloise Ladies Tour
7th Chrono des Nations
8th Time trial, European Road Championships
2024
7th Omloop van het Hageland
7th GP Oetingen
8th Time trial, European Road Championships
2025
6th GP Oetingen
