= Yugoslav Cycling Federation =

- Sport: Cycling
- Jurisdiction: Yugoslavia
- Abbreviation: BSJ
- Founded: 1948
- (Socialist Federal Republic of Yugoslavia)

The Yugoslav Cycling Federation or BSJ (in Serbo-Croatian: Biciklistički savez Jugoslavije) was the national governing body of cycle racing in Yugoslavia.

The BSJ was a member of the UCI.

== History ==
Yugoslav Cycling Federation was founded in Zagreb as Jugoslovenski koturaški savez in 1920. After World War II it was refounded in Belgrade in 1948. The BSJ organized Yugoslav National Road Race Championships, Yugoslav National Time Trial Championships, Tour of Croatia and Slovenia (from 1937) and Tour of Yugoslavia (from 1947). It was dissolved with the dissolution of SFR Yugoslavia.
