= Sveti Lenart, Cerklje na Gorenjskem =

Sveti Lenart Lenart na Rebri (1955–1994)
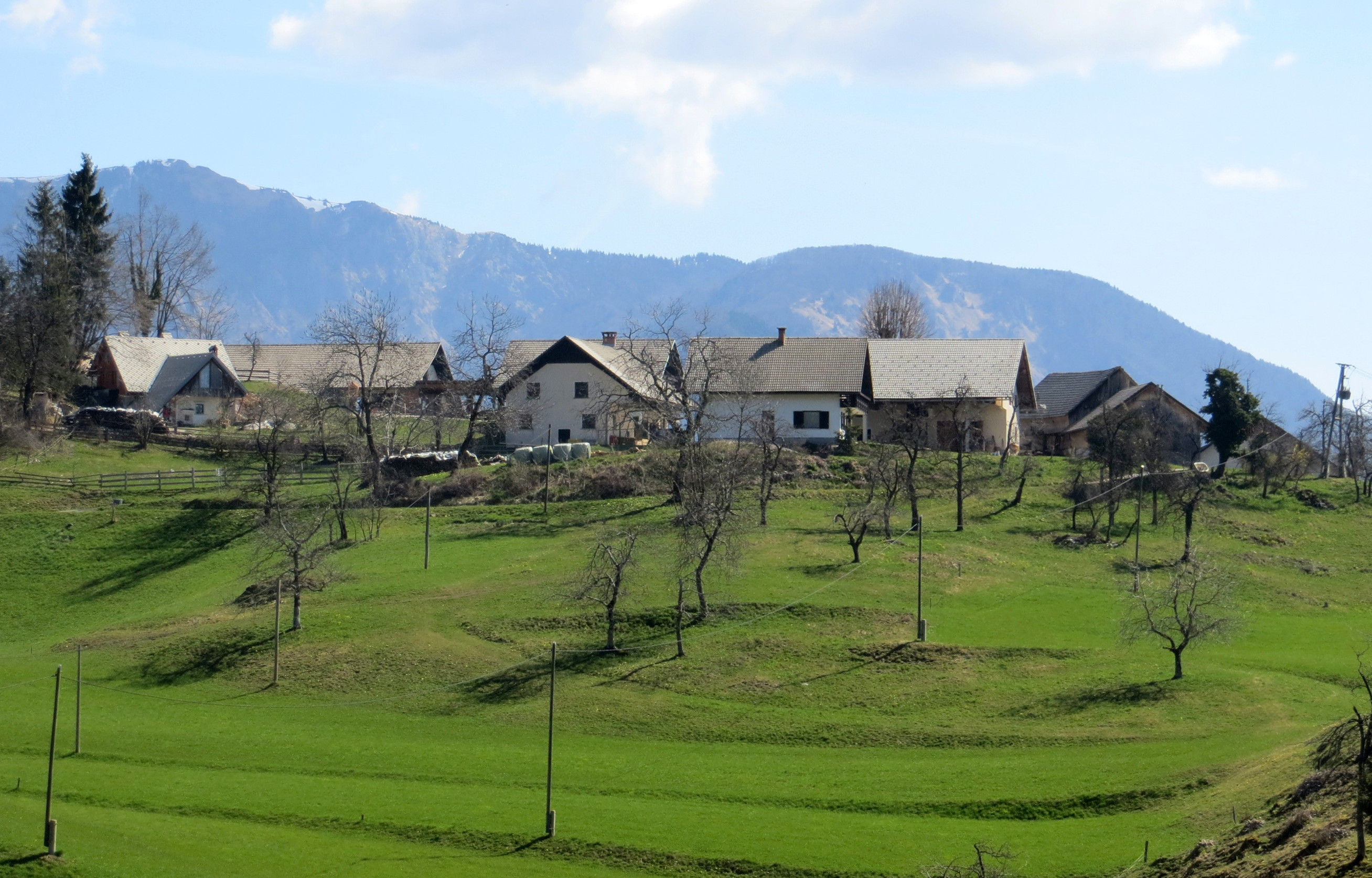

- Location in Slovenia
- Coordinates: 46°16′2.44″N 14°33′8.72″E
- Country: Slovenia
- Traditional Region: Upper Carniola
- Statistical region: Upper Carniola
- Municipality: Cerklje na Gorenjskem
- Elevation: 744.1 m (2,441 ft)

Population (2020)
  - Total: 41

Sveti Lenart (pronounced [ˈsʋeːti ˈleːnaɾt]; German: Sankt Leonhard) is a small settlement in the Municipality of Cerklje na Gorenjskem in the Upper Carniola region of Slovenia.

== Name ==
The name of the settlement was changed from Sveti Lenart na Rebri (literally, 'Saint Leonard on the slope') to Lenart na Rebri (literally, 'Leonard on the slope') in 1955. The name was changed on the basis of the 1948 Law on Names of Settlements and Designations of Squares, Streets, and Buildings as part of efforts by Slovenia's postwar communist government to remove religious elements from toponyms. The name Sveti Lenart was restored in 1994. In the past the German name was Sankt Leonhard.

== Church ==
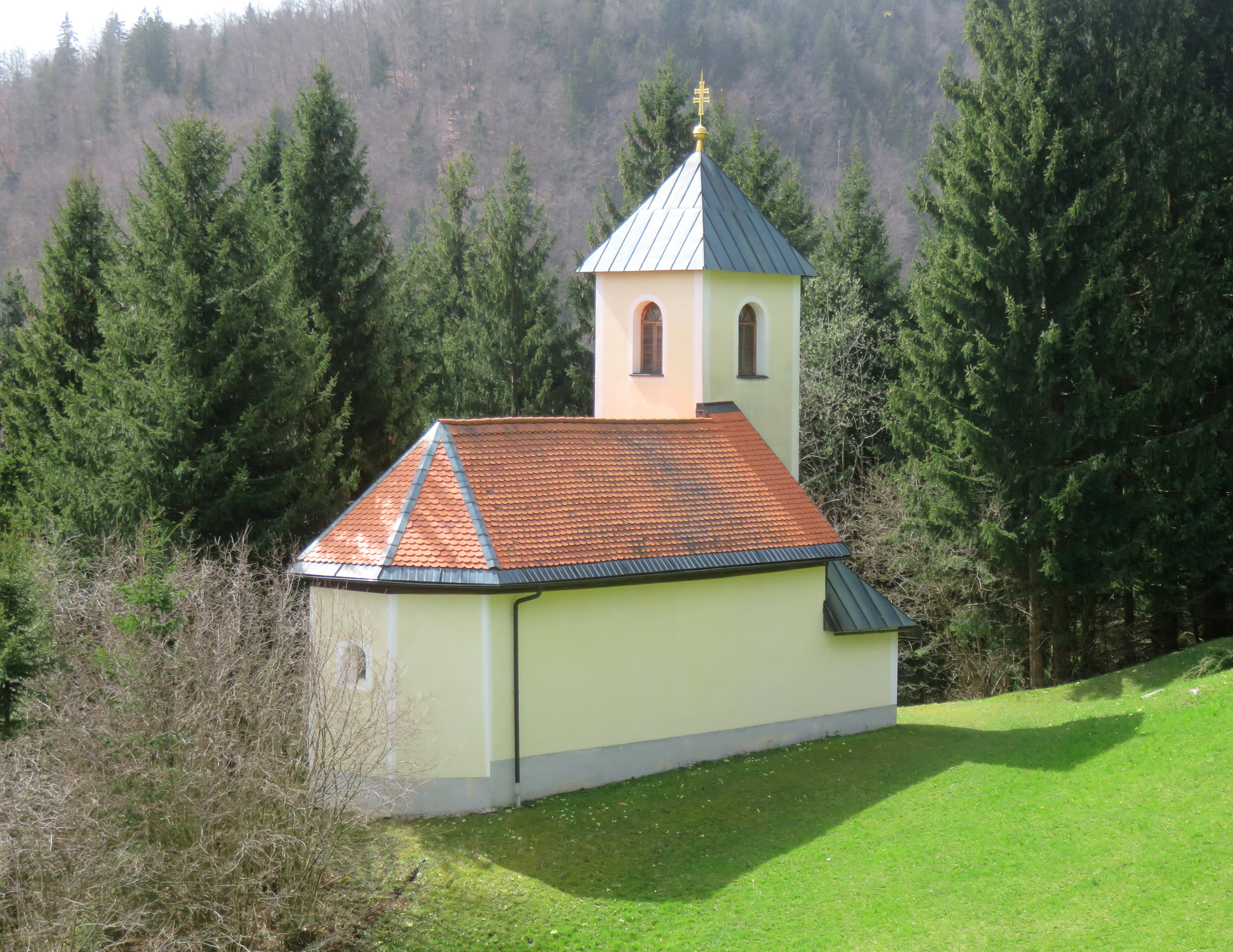
Saint Leonard's Church

The local church is dedicated to Saint Leonard and stands isolated above the village. It was first mentioned in 1499, but it was extensively rebuilt at various stages, most recently in the 19th century.
