= 2015 Crescent Women World Cup Vårgårda TTT =

2015 Crescent Women World Cup Vårgårda Team time trial
2015 UCI Women's Road World Cup, race 8 of 10

Race details
- Dates: 21 August 2015
- Stages: 1
- Distance: 42.5 km (26.4 mi)
- Winning time: 52' 51"

Results
	Winner	Rabobank-Liv Woman Cycling Team
	Second	Velocio–SRAM
	Third	Boels–Dolmans

The 2015 Crescent Women World Cup Vårgårda Team time trial featured as the eighth round of the 2015 UCI Women's Road World Cup. It was held on 21 August 2015, in Vårgårda, Sweden. Rabobank-Liv Woman Cycling Team won, beating Velocio–SRAM and Boels–Dolmans.

== Results ==
Result
Rank	Team	Time
1	Rabobank-Liv Woman Cycling Team Lucinda Brand (NED) Anna van der Breggen (NED); Shara Gillow (AUS) Thalita de Jong (NED)	52' 51"
2	Velocio–SRAM Lisa Brennauer (GER) Trixi Worrack (GER); Karol-Ann Canuel (CAN) Alena Amialiusik (BLR)	+ 26"
3	Boels–Dolmans Lizzie Armitstead (GBR) Chantal Blaak (NED); Evelyn Stevens (USA) Christine Majerus (LUX)	+ 29"
4	Bigla Pro Cycling Team	+ 49"
5	Wiggle–Honda	+ 1' 31"
6	Team Liv–Plantur	+ 2' 10"
7	BTC City Ljubljana	+ 2' 55"
8	Orica–AIS	+ 2' 55"
9	Team Hitec Products	+ 3' 08"
10	BePink–La Classica	+ 3' 39"
Source: ProCyclingStats

== World Cup Standings ==
Individual ranking after 8 of 10 World Cup races
Rank	Rider	Team	Points
1	Lizzie Armitstead (GBR)	Boels–Dolmans	360
2	Anna van der Breggen (NED)	Rabobank-Liv Woman Cycling Team	325
3	Elisa Longo Borghini (ITA)	Wiggle–Honda	312
4	Jolien D'Hoore (BEL)	Wiggle–Honda	271
5	Alena Amialiusik (BLR)	Velocio–SRAM	255
6	Lucinda Brand (NED)	Rabobank-Liv Woman Cycling Team	227
7	Annemiek van Vleuten (NED)	Bigla Pro Cycling Team	226
8	Elena Cecchini (ITA)	Lotto–Soudal Ladies	182
9	Pauline Ferrand-Prévot (FRA)	Rabobank-Liv Woman Cycling Team	175
10	Barbara Guarischi (ITA)	Velocio–SRAM	145
Source: Union Cycliste Internationale
