= BTC City Ljubljana =

Slovenian cycling team

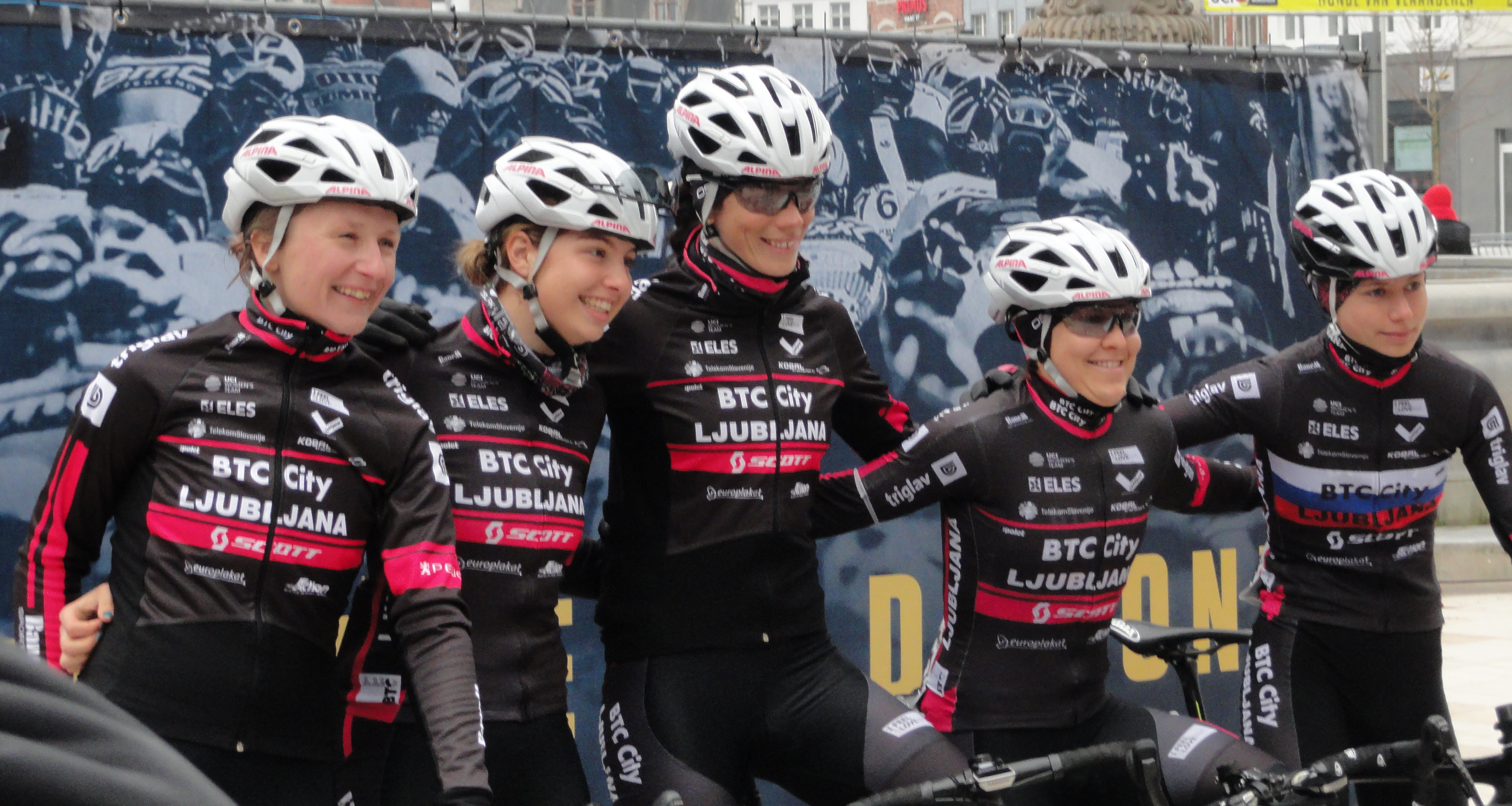

Team information
- UCI code: BTC
- Registered: Slovenia
- Founded: 2010
- Disbanded: 2019
- Discipline: Road
- Status: National (2010–2013); UCI Women's Team (2014–2019)
- Bicycles: Scott

Key personnel
- General manager: Gorazd Penko

Team name history
- 2010–2012 2013 2014–2019: Klub Polet Garmin; E. Leclerc Klub Polet; BTC City Ljubljana

BTC City Ljubljana (UCI team code: BTC) was a professional cycling team based in Slovenia, which competed in elite road bicycle racing events such as the UCI Women's World Tour between 2010 and 2019.

== Team history ==
At the end of the team's first season at UCI level in 2014 the Slovenian Cycling Federation awarded the team a prize for their role in the development of cycling in Slovenia, as well as, for the team's achievements in its first year – culminating in qualifying for the 2014 World Team Time Trial championships.

For the 2020 season, the team merged with Alé–Cipollini to become new UCI Women's World Tour team Alé BTC Ljubljana.

== Final team roster ==
As of 7 July 2019.

Rider	Date of birth
Maaike Boogaard (NED)	24 August 1998 (aged 20)
Urška Bravec (SLO)	14 December 1996 (aged 22)
Eugenia Bujak (POL)	25 June 1989 (aged 30)
Anastasiia Chursina (RUS)	7 April 1995 (aged 24)
Špela Kern (SLO)	24 February 1990 (aged 29)
Anja Longyka (SLO)	21 June 1993 (aged 26)
Hanna Nilsson (SWE)	16 February 1992 (aged 27)

Rider	Date of birth
Urša Pintar (SLO)	3 October 1985 (aged 33)
Mia Radotić (CRO)	2 December 1984 (aged 34)
Rossella Ratto (ITA)	20 October 1993 (aged 25)
Maja Savić (SRB)	27 July 1994 (aged 24)
Hayley Simmonds (GBR)	22 July 1988 (aged 30)
Monique van de Ree (NED)	2 March 1988 (aged 31)
Urška Žigart (SLO)	4 December 1996 (aged 22)

== Major wins ==
2014
Nagrada Ljubljane TT, Martina Ritter
2015
Stage 2 Internationale Thüringen Rundfahrt der Frauen, Eugenia Bujak
2016
Overall Gracia–Orlová, Olena Pavlukhina

Stage 2, Olena Pavlukhina

Stages 1 & 6 Route de France, Eugenia Bujak
GP Plouay, Eugenia Bujak
2017
Sprints classification Thüringen Rundfahrt der Frauen, Eugenia Bujak
Mountains classification Tour Cycliste Féminin International de l'Ardèche, Hanna Nilsson
2018
Youth classification Tour of Chongming Island, Anastasiia Iakovenko
Leo Wirth Gedächtnissrennen, Corinna Lechner
Radfestival Kladow 1, Corinna Lechner
Radfestival Kladow 2, Corinna Lechner
2019
Team classification Vuelta a Burgos Feminas
Erondegemse Pijl (Erpe-Mere), Monique van de Ree

== National and Continental Champions ==
2010
Slovenia Time Trial, Tjasa Rutar
2011
Slovenia Time Trial, Tjasa Rutar
2012
Slovenia Time Trial, Tjasa Rutar
2013
Slovenia Time Trial, Sara Frece
2014
European Track (Points race), Eugenia Bujak
Austrian Time Trial, Martina Ritter
Croatian Cyclo-cross, Mia Radotić
Poland Time Trial, Eugenia Bujak
Slovenian Road Race, Polona Batagelj
Slovenian Time Trial, Polona Batagelj
2015
Austrian Time Trial, Martina Ritter
Austrian Road Race, Martina Ritter
Azerbaijan Road Race, Olena Pavlukhina
Azerbaijan Time Trial, Olena Pavlukhina
Croatia Road Race, Mia Radotić
Croatia Time Trial, Mia Radotić
Poland Time Trial, Eugenia Bujak
Slovenia Time Trila, Polona Batagelj
Slovenia Road Race, Polona Batagelj
2016
Azerbaijan Road Race, Olena Pavlukhina
Azerbaijan Time Trial, Olena Pavlukhina
Slovenia Time Trial, Urša Pintar
Croatia Road Race, Mia Radotić
Croatia Time Trial, Mia Radotić
Austrian Time Trial, Martina Ritter
Serbia Time Trial, Jelena Erić
Serbia Road Race, Jelena Erić
Slovenia Road Race, Polona Batagelj
2017
Slovenia Time Trial, Urša Pintar
Croatian Time Trial, Mia Radotić
Serbia Time Trial, Jelena Erić
Croatian Road Race, Mia Radotić
Slovenia Road Race, Polona Batagelj
2018
Slovenia Time Trial, Eugenia Bujak
Croatian Time Trial, Mia Radotić
Slovenia Road Race, Polona Batagelj
Croatian Road Race, Mia Radotić
Azerbaijan Road Race, Olena Pavlukhina
Azerbaijan Time Trial, Olena Pavlukhina
Russia Track (Team pursuit), Anastasiia Iakovenko
2019
Slovenia Time Trial, Eugenia Bujak
Croatian Time Trial, Mia Radotić
Slovenia Road Race, Eugenia Bujak
