= 2023 UCI Road World Championships – Women's under-23 road race =

Cycling race

Women's under-23 road race
2023 UCI Road World Championships

Race details
- Dates: 13 August 2023
- Stages: 1 in Glasgow, Great Britain
- Distance: 154.1 km (95.75 mi)
- Winning time: 4h 06' 46"

Medalists
	Gold	(Hungary) Blanka Vas (HUN)
	Silver	(Netherlands) Shirin van Anrooij (NED)
	Bronze	(United Kingdom) Anna Shackley (GBR)

The women's under-23 road race title and rankings of the 2023 UCI Road World Championships were derived from the results of age-qualified participants in the women's elite road race that took place on 13 August 2023 in Glasgow, Great Britain. Hungarian cyclist Blanka Vas won the title.

== Final classification ==
Rank	Rider	Country	Time
1	Blanka Vas	Hungary	4h 06' 46"
2	Shirin van Anrooij	Netherlands	+ 0"
3	Anna Shackley	Great Britain	+ 0"
4	Julie de Wilde	Belgium	+ 10' 08"
5	Megan Jastrab	United States	+ 10' 15"
6	Marthe Goossens	Belgium	+ 10' 15"
7	Dominika Wlodarczyk	Poland	+ 10' 15"
8	Linda Riedmann	Germany	+ 10' 15"
9	Sarah van Dam	Canada	+ 10' 15"
10	Ella Wyllie	New Zealand	+ 10' 15"
11	Marie Schreiber	Luxembourg	+ 10' 15"
12	Noëlle Rüetschi	Switzerland	+ 10' 15"
13	Eliška Kvasničková	Czech Republic	+ 10' 15"
14	Lara Gillespie	Ireland	+ 10' 15"
15	Léa Curinier	France	+ 10' 24"
16	Antonia Niedermaier	Germany	+ 10' 27"
17	Yanina Kuskova	Uzbekistan	+ 10' 30"
18	Kim Cadzow	New Zealand	+ 10' 31"
19	Julia Borgström	Sweden	+ 15' 12"
	Eleonora Camilla Gasparini	Italy	DNF
	Ally Wollaston	New Zealand	DNF
	Nina Berton	Luxembourg	DNF
	Linda Zanetti	Switzerland	DNF
	Noemi Rüegg	Switzerland	DNF
	Anniina Ahtosalo	Finland	DNF
	Solbjørk Minke Anderson	Denmark	DNF
	Daniela Campos	Portugal	DNF
	Diane Ingabire	Rwanda	DNF
	Nora Jenčušová	Slovakia	DNF
	Nofar Maoz	Israel	DNF
	Tang Xin	China	DNF
	Margarita Misyurina	Uzbekistan	DNF
	Petra Zsankó	Hungary	DNF
	Fariba Hashimi	Afghanistan	DNF
	Akari Kobayashi	Japan	DNF
	Elisa Winter	Austria	DNF
	Leila Gschwentner	Austria	DNF
	Catalina Soto Campos	Chile	DNF
	Cédrine Kerbaol	France	DNF
	Frances Janse van Rensburg	South Africa	DNF
	Sofiya Karimova	Uzbekistan	DNF
	Kristýna Burlová	Czech Republic	DNF
	Jazilla Mwamikazi	Rwanda	DNF
	Xaveline Nirere	Rwanda	DNF
	Kamonrada Khaoplot	Thailand	DNF
	Nesrine Houili	Algeria	DNF
	Monique du Plessis	Namibia	DNF
	Safia Al Sayegh	United Arab Emirates	DNF
	Lee Sze Wing	Singapore	DNF
	Mary Samuel	Nigeria	DNF
	Raja Chakir	Morocco	DNF
	Yareli Acevedo	Mexico	DNF
	Zahra Rezayee	Afghanistan	DNF
	Bucumi Beolyne	Burundi	DNF
	Emmanuella Rukundo	Burundi	DNF
	Florence Nakagwa	Uganda	DNF
	Fanny Cauchois One	Laos	DNF
