= 2024 UCI Road World Championships – Women's road race =

Cycling race

Women's road race
2024 UCI Road World Championships
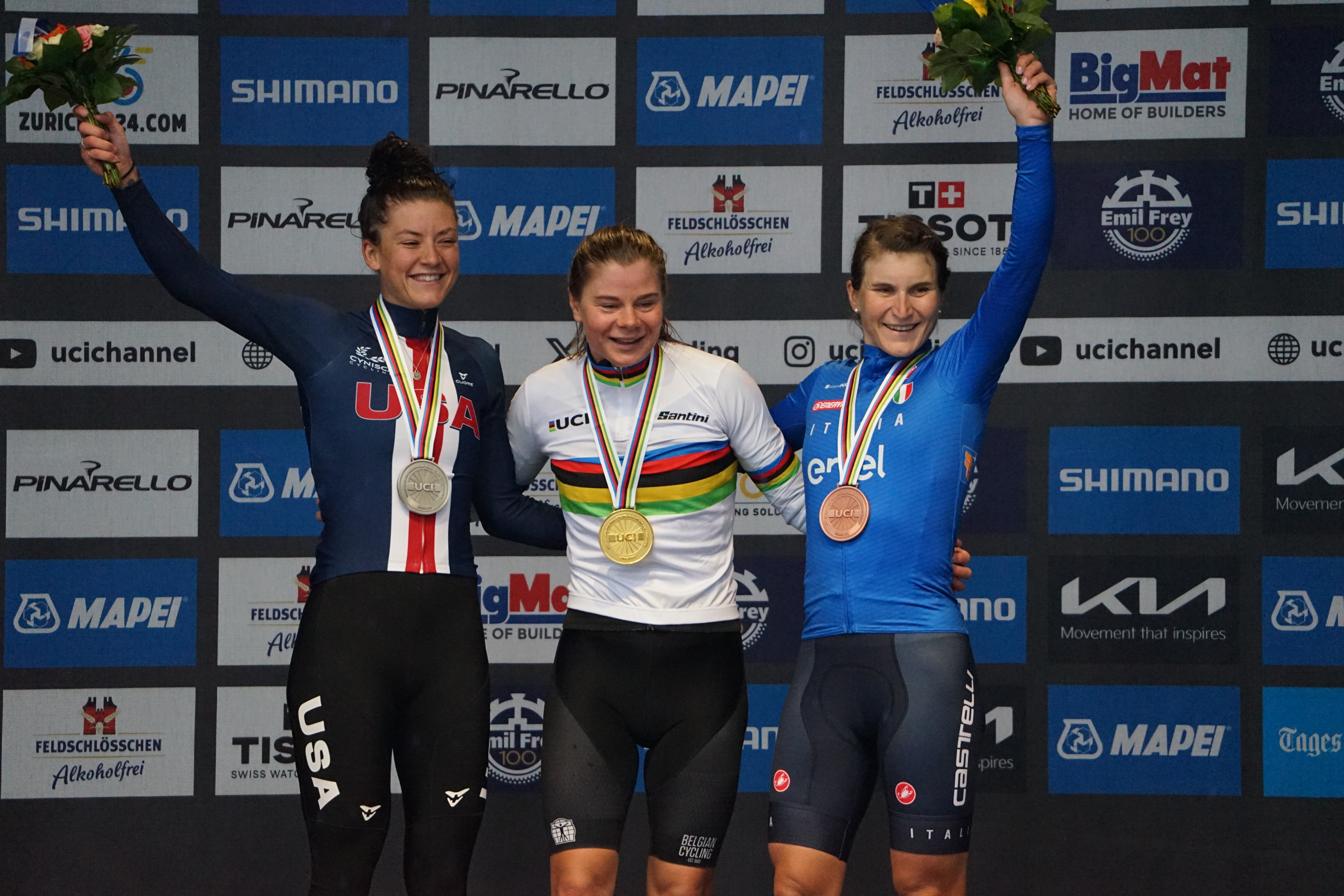
- The race podium

Race details
- Dates: 28 September 2024
- Stages: 1 in Zurich, Switzerland
- Distance: 154.1 km (95.8 mi)
- Winning time: 4h 02' 12"

Medalists
	Gold	(Belgium) Lotte Kopecky (BEL)
	Silver	(United States) Chloé Dygert (USA)
	Bronze	(Italy) Elisa Longo Borghini (ITA)

The women's road race of the 2024 UCI Road World Championships was a cycling event that took place on 28 September 2024 in Zurich, Switzerland. The race was won by Belgian rider Lotte Kopecky for the second year running.

== Qualification ==
Qualification was based mainly on the UCI World Ranking by nations as of 20 August 2024.

=== UCI World Rankings ===
The following nations qualified.

Nations	Riders
Belgium	7
France	7
Italy	7
Poland	7
Netherlands	7
Australia	6
Austria	6
Canada	6
Denmark	6
Germany	6
Great Britain	6
New Zealand	6
Spain	6
Switzerland	6
United States	6
Colombia	5
Cuba	5
Finland	5
Luxembourg	5
Norway	5
South Africa	5

=== Continental champions ===
Name	Country	Reason
Lotte Kopecky	Belgium	Incumbent World Champion
Kristen Faulkner	United States	Olympic Champion
Lauren Stephens	United States	Panamerican Champion
Song Min-ji	South Korea	Asian Champion
Katelyn Nicholson	Australia	Oceanian Champion

=== Participating nations ===
197 cyclists from 67 nations competed in the event. The number of cyclists per nation is shown in parentheses.

- Argentina (1)
- Australia (6)
- Austria (6)
- Afghanistan (2)
- Azerbaijan (1)
- Belgium (7)
- Brazil (1)
- Benin (1)
- Bolivia (2)
- Bulgaria (3)
- Burundi (1)
- Canada (6)
- Chile (1)
- China (3)
- Colombia (4)
- Cyprus (1)
- Czech Republic (3)
- Denmark (6)
- Ecuador (3)
- El Salvador (1)
- Eritrea (1)
- Estonia (2)
- France (7)
- Germany (6)
- Great Britain (6)
- Greece (1)
- Honduras (1)
- Hong Kong (2)
- Hungary (2)
- Indonesia (2)
- Ireland (3)
- Israel (2)
- Italy (7)
- Japan (3)
- Latvia (1)
- Lithuania (1)
- Luxembourg (3)
- Mauritius (1)
- Malta (1)
- Mexico (3)
- Mongolia (3)
- Morocco (1)
- Namibia (1)
- Netherlands (7)
- New Zealand (3)
- Norway (5)
- Paraguay (1)
- Poland (7)
- Portugal (2)
- Romania (2)
- Rwanda (3)
- Serbia (1)
- Slovakia (1)
- Slovenia (3)
- South Africa (4)
- Spain (6)
- Sweden (3)
- Switzerland (6)
- Thailand (1)
- Turkey (2)
- Trinidad and Tobago (1)
- Uganda (1)
- Ukraine (3)
- United Arab Emirates (1)
- Uruguay (1)
- United States (7)
- Uzbekistan (5)
- Venezuela (2)
- Zimbabwe (2)
- Refugee Olympic Team (1)

== Final classification ==
Rank	Rider	Country	Time
1	Lotte Kopecky	Belgium	4h 05' 26"
2	Chloé Dygert	United States	+ 0"
3	Elisa Longo Borghini	Italy	+ 0"
4	Liane Lippert	Germany	+ 0"
5	Demi Vollering	Netherlands	+ 0"
6	Ruby Roseman-Gannon	Australia	+ 0"
7	Justine Ghekiere	Belgium	+ 1' 06"
8	Marianne Vos	Netherlands	+ 1' 06"
9	Riejanne Markus	Netherlands	+ 1' 06"
10	Blanka Vas	Hungary	+ 3' 00"
11	Noemi Ruegg	Switzerland	+ 3' 00"
12	Juliette Labous	France	+ 3' 00"
13	Puck Pieterse	Netherlands	+ 3' 00"
14	Magdeleine Vallieres	Canada	+ 3' 00"
15	Neve Bradbury	Australia	+ 3' 00"
16	Caroline Andersson	Sweden	+ 3' 00"
17	Kasia Niewiadoma	Poland	+ 3' 00"
18	Antonia Niedermaier	Germany	+ 3' 00"
19	Mischa Bredewold	Netherlands	+ 3' 00"
20	Sarah Gigante	Australia	+ 3' 21"
21	Anna Henderson	United Kingdom	+ 4' 19"
22	Ava Holmgren	Canada	+ 4' 19"
23	Elise Chabbey	Switzerland	+ 4' 21"
24	Urška Žigart	Slovenia	+ 4' 21"
25	Niamh Fisher-Black	New Zealand	+ 9' 01"
26	Évita Muzic	France	+ 9' 01"
27	Ingvild Gaskjenn	Norway	+ 10' 10"
28	Carina Schrempf	Australia	+ 10' 10"
29	Yuliia Biriukova	Ukraine	+ 10' 10"
30	Grace Brown	Australia	+ 10' 10"
31	Lauren Stephens	United States	+ 10' 10"
32	Alice Towers	United Kingdom	+ 10' 10"
33	Cecilie Ludwig	Denmark	+ 10' 10"
34	Paula Patiño	Colombia	+ 10' 10"
35	Kristen Faulkner	United States	+ 10' 10"
36	Ashleigh Moolman Pasio	South Africa	+ 10' 10"
37	Mie Ottestad	Norway	+ 10' 10"
38	Brodie Chapman	Australia	+ 10' 10"
39	Katrine Aalerud	Norway	+ 10' 10"
40	Elena Hartmann	Switzerland	+ 10' 10"
41	Olivia Baril	Canada	+ 10' 10"
42	Gaia Realini	Italy	+ 11' 01"
43	Franziska Koch	Germany	+ 11' 01"
44	Christine Majerus	Luxembourg	+ 11' 01"
45	Dominika Włodarczyk	Poland	+ 11' 01"
46	Cedrine Kerbaol	France	+ 11' 01"
47	Teniel Campbell	Trinidad and Tobago	+ 11' 01"
48	Usoa Ostolaza	Spain	+ 11' 01"
49	Eneritz Vadillo Crespo	Spain	+ 11' 01"
50	Alice Arzuffi	Italy	+ 11' 01"
51	Clara Emond	Canada	+ 11' 01"
52	Lotte Claes	Belgium	+ 11' 01"
53	Sara Martín	Spain	+ 11' 01"
54	Sigrid Haugset	Norway	+ 11' 01"
55	Fariba Hashimi	Afghanistan	+ 11' 01"
56	Erica Magnaldi	Italy	+ 11' 01"
57	Marion Bunel	France	+ 11' 01"
58	Barbara Malcotti	Italy	+ 11' 01"
59	Olha Kulynych	Ukraine	+ 11' 07"
60	Soraya Paladin	Italy	+ 11' 07"
61	Elinor Barker	United Kingdom	+ 15' 17"
62	Ruth Edwards	United States	+ 18' 31"
63	Mireia Benito	Spain	+ 18' 31"
64	Alison Jackson	Canada	+ 21' 05"
65	Fiona Mangan	Ireland	+ 21' 05"
66	Yanina Kuskova	Uzbekistan	+ 21' 05"
67	Ana Vitória Magalhães	Brazil	+ 21' 05"
68	Paula Blasi	Spain	+ 21' 05"
69	Marte Edseth	Norway	+ 21' 05"
70	Anastasia Carbonari	Latvia	+ 21' 05"
71	Nina Berton	Luxembourg	+ 21' 05"
72	Jasmin Liechti	Switzerland	+ 21' 05"
73	Eri Yonamine	Japan	+ 21' 05"
74	Yurina Kinoshita	Japan	+ 21' 05"
75	Stina Kagevi	Sweden	+ 21' 05"
76	Rebecca Koerner	Denmark	+ 21' 05"
77	Solbjork Anderson	Denmark	+ 21' 05"
78	Julia Borgstrom	Sweden	+ 21' 05"
79	Julie de Wilde	Belgium	+ 21' 27"
80	Margot Vanpachtenbeke	Belgium	+ 21' 27"
81	Fernanda Yapura	Argentina	+ 26' 57"

Rank	Rider	Country	Time
	Pauliena Rooijakkers	Netherlands	DNF
	Malwina Mul	Poland	DNF
	Agua Marina Espínola	Paraguay	DNF
	Linda Riedmann	Germany	DNF
	Tabea Huys	Austria	DNF
	Adar Shriki	Israel	DNF
	Alberte Greve	Denmark	DNF
	Daniela Campos	Portugal	DNF
	Miryam Núñez	Ecuador	DNF
	Nora Jenčušová	Slovakia	DNF
	Barbora Němcova	Czech Republic	DNF
	Anet Barrera	Mexico	DNF
	Lee Sze Wing	Hong Kong	DNF
	Karolina Perekitko	Poland	DNF
	Henrietta Christie	New Zealand	DNF
	Jelena Erić	Serbia	DNF
	Mara Roldan	Canada	DNF
	Juliana Londoño	Colombia	DNF
	Tiffany Cromwell	Australia	DNF
	Urša Pintar	Slovenia	DNF
	Josie Nelson	United Kingdom	DNF
	Jade Wiel	France	DNF
	Clara Koppenburg	Germany	DNF
	Hannah Ludwig	Germany	DNF
	Caroline Baur	Switzerland	DNF
	Špela Kern	Slovenia	DNF
	Emily Ehrlich	United States	DNF
	Floren Villanueva	Bolivia	DNF
	S'Annara Grove	South Africa	DNF
	Tiffany Keep	South Africa	DNF
	Romina Hinojosa	Mexico	DNF
	Valerie Demey	Belgium	DNF
	Maja Brandt	Denmark	DNF
	Tang Xin	China	DNF
	Marcela Panafiel	Ecuador	DNF
	Estefania Herrera	Colombia	DNF
	Phetdarin Somrat	Thailand	DNF
	Elina Tasane	Estonia	DNF
	Argyro Milaki	Greece	DNF
	Caoimhe O'Brien	Ireland	DNF
	Maho Kakita	Japan	DNF
	Diane Ingabire	Rwanda	DNF
	Zhou Qiuying	China	DNF
	Natalia Vásquez	Ecuador	DNF
	Ayustina Delia Priatna	Indonesia	DNF
	Elisa Balsamo	Italy	DNF
	Thalita de Jong	Netherlands	DNF
	Mavi García	Spain	DNF
	Marie Schreiber	Luxembourg	DNF
	Heidi Franz	United States	DNS
	Julie van de Velde	Belgium	DNF
	Lea Curinier	France	DNF
	Pauline Ferrand-Prevot	France	DNF
	Marta Lach	Poland	DNF
	Marta Jaskulska	Poland	DNF
	Valentina Cavallar	Austria	DNF
	Rasa Leleivytė	Lithuania	DNF
	Antri Christoforou	Cyprus	DNF
	Wing Yee Leung	Hong Kong	DNF
	Marcela Prieto	Mexico	DNF
	Ana Caramelo	Portugal	DNF
	Amber Neben	United States	DNF
	Aoife O'Brien	Ireland	DNF
	Elisa Winter	Austria	DNF
	Lucie de Marignylagesse	Mauritius	DNF
	Zeng Luyao	China	DNF
	Anujin Jinjiibadam	Mongolia	DNF
	Ksanet Weldemikeal	Eritrea	DNF
	Jessicaa Pratt	Malta	DNF
	Sara Torrico	Bolivia	DNF
	Monique du Plessis	Namibia	DNF
	Otto Taneal	South Africa	DNF
	Dewika Mulya Solva	Indonesia	DNF
	Gergana Stoyanova	Bulgaria	DNF
	Diana Peñuela	Colombia	DNF
	Valentine Nzayisenga	Rwanda	DNF
	Neyran Elden Köşker	Turkey	DNF
	Enkhmaa Enkhtur	Mongolia	DNF
	Viktoriya Sidorenko	Azerbaijan	DNF
	Mallika Benallal	Morocco	DNF
	Gissele Andino	Honduras	DNF
	Petya Minkova	Bulgaria	DNF
	Hermionne Ahouissou	Benin	DNF
	Iuliana Cioclu	Romania	DNF
	Sauking Shi	El Salvador	DNF
	Jazilla Mwamikazi	Rwanda	DNF
	Sevim Gercek	Turkey	DNF
	Agnieszka Skalniak-Sójka	Poland	DNF
	Emma Bjerg	Denmark	DNF
	Claire Steels	United Kingdom	DNF
	Kathrin Schweinberger	Austria	DNF
	Laura Sander	Estonia	DNF
	Ella Wyllie	New Zealand	DNF
	Elizabeth Holden	United Kingdom	DNF
	Christina Schweinberger	Austria	DNF
	Ivana Tonkova	Bulgaria	DNF
	Szonja Greman	Hungary	DNF
	Eyeru Gebru	Refugee Olympic Team	DNF
	Lilibeth Chacón	Venezuela	DNF
	Shakhnoza Abdullaeva	Uzbekistan	DNF
	Olha Shekel	Ukraine	DNF
	Safia Al Sayegh	United Arab Emirates	DNF
	Nela Slanikova	Czech Republic	DNF
	Yulduz Hashimi	Afghanistan	DNF
	Catalina Soto	Chile	DNF
	Agustina Reyes	Uruguay	DNF
	Rukundo Emmanuella	Burundi	DNF
	Lore de Schepper	Belgium	DNF
	Linda Zanetti	Switzerland	DNF
	Nikola Noskova	Czech Republic	DNF
	Cătălina Andreea Cătineanu	Romania	DNF
	Solongo Tserenlkham	Mongolia	DNF
	Rotem Gafinovitz	Israel	DNS
