= 2023 UCI Road World Championships – Women's road race =

Cycling race

Women's road race
2023 UCI Road World Championships

Race details
- Dates: 13 August 2023
- Stages: 1 in Balloch, Great Britain
- Distance: 154.1 km (95.8 mi)
- Winning time: 4h 02' 12"

Medalists
	Gold	(Belgium) Lotte Kopecky (BEL)
	Silver	(Netherlands) Demi Vollering (NED)
	Bronze	(Denmark) Cecilie Uttrup Ludwig (DEN)

The women's road race of the 2023 UCI Road World Championships was a cycling event that took place on 13 August 2023 in Balloch, Great Britain. The race was won by Belgian Lotte Kopecky for the first time.

== Qualification ==
Qualification was based mainly on the UCI World Ranking by nations as of 30 June 2023.

=== UCI World Rankings ===
The following nations qualified.

Nations	Riders
Australia	7
Belgium	7
France	7
Italy	7
Netherlands	7
Canada	6
Denmark	6
Germany	6
Great Britain	6
New Zealand	6
Poland	6
South Africa	6
Spain	6
Switzerland	6
United States	6
Neutral athletes of Russian sporting nationality	5
Austria	5
Cuba	5
Norway	5
Uzbekistan	5

=== Continental champions ===
Name	Country	Reason
Annemiek van Vleuten	Netherlands	Incumbent World Champion
Ese Ukpeseraye	Nigeria	African Champion
Skylar Schneider	United States	Panamerican Champion
Nguyễn Thị Thật	Vietnam	Asian Champion

=== Participating nations ===
210 cyclists from 71 nations competed in the event. The number of cyclists per nation is shown in parentheses.

- Argentina (2)
- Algeria (1)
- Australia (7)
- Austria (5)
- Belgium (7)
- Bermuda (1)
- Brazil (1)
- British Virgin Islands (1)
- Burkina Faso (1)
- Canada (6)
- Chile (1)
- China (3)
- Colombia (3)
- Cyprus (1)
- Czech Republic (3)
- Denmark (6)
- Ecuador (1)
- Finland (1)
- France (7)
- Germany (6)
- Great Britain (6)
- Greece (1)
- Hong Kong (3)
- Hungary (2)
- Indonesia (1)
- Ireland (3)
- Israel (2)
- Italy (7)
- Japan (2)
- Kazakhstan (3)
- Latvia (2)
- Luxembourg (3)
- Mauritius (3)
- Morocco (1)
- Namibia (2)
- Netherlands (8)
- New Zealand (5)
- Nigeria (3)
- Norway (5)
- Paraguay (1)
- Poland (6)
- Portugal (2)
- Rwanda (3)
- Serbia (1)
- Slovakia (1)
- Slovenia (3)
- South Africa (6)
- Spain (5)
- Sweden (3)
- Switzerland (6)
- Trinidad and Tobago (1)
- Uganda (1)
- Ukraine (3)
- United Arab Emirates (1)
- United States (7)
- Uzbekistan (5)
- Venezuela (2)
- Zimbabwe (2)

== Final classification ==
Rank	Rider	Country	Time
1	Lotte Kopecky	Belgium	4h 02' 12"
2	Demi Vollering	Netherlands	+ 7"
3	Cecilie Uttrup Ludwig	Denmark	+ 7"
4	Marlen Reusser	Switzerland	+ 12"
5	Christina Schweinberger	Austria	+ 34"
6	Elizabeth Deignan	United Kingdom	+ 34"
7	Elise Chabbey	Switzerland	+ 1' 24"
8	Annemiek van Vleuten	Netherlands	+ 2' 48"
9	Riejanne Markus	Netherlands	+ 3' 51"
10	Mavi García	Spain	+ 4' 05"
11	Kata Blanka Vas	Hungary	+ 4' 34"
12	Silvia Persico	Italy	+ 4' 34"
13	Shirin van Anrooij	Netherlands	+ 4' 34"
14	Agnieszka Skalniak	Poland	+ 4' 34"
15	Ashleigh Moolman Pasio	South Africa	+ 4' 34"
16	Juliette Labous	France	+ 4' 34"
17	Anna Shackley	United Kingdom	+ 4' 34"
18	Lauren Stephens	United States	+ 4' 34"
19	Liane Lippert	Germany	+ 4' 34"
20	Chiara Consonni	Italy	+ 5' 13"
21	Marta Lach	Poland	+ 8' 11"
22	Justine Ghekiere	Belgium	+ 8' 26"
23	Lauretta Hanson	Australia	+ 8' 26"
24	Grace Brown	Australia	+ 8' 26"
25	Jelena Erić	Serbia	+ 8' 26"
26	Audrey Cordon-Ragot	France	+ 8' 26"
27	Paula Patiño	Colombia	+ 8' 26"
28	Pfeiffer Georgi	United Kingdom	+ 8' 26"
29	Elisa Balsamo	Italy	+ 8' 26"
30	Elena Cecchini	Italy	+ 8' 29"
31	Soraya Paladin	Italy	+ 8' 29"
32	Simone Boilard	Canada	+ 9' 11"
33	Alison Jackson	Canada	+ 13' 47"
34	Olivia Baril	Canada	+ 13' 47"
35	Julie de Wilde	Belgium	+ 14' 42"
36	Megan Jastrab	United States	+ 14' 49"
37	Romy Kasper	Germany	+ 14' 49"
38	Kathrin Schweinberger	Austria	+ 14' 49"
39	Anastasia Carbonari	Latvia	+ 14' 49"
40	Marthe Goossens	Belgium	+ 14' 49"
41	Karolina Kumięga	Poland	+ 14' 49"
42	Eri Yonamine	Japan	+ 14' 49"
43	Dominika Wlodarczyk	Poland	+ 14' 49"
44	Linda Riedmann	Germany	+ 14' 49"
45	Loes Adegeest	Netherlands	+ 14' 49"
46	Sarah van Dam	Canada	+ 14' 49"
47	Marianne Vos	Netherlands	+ 14' 49"
48	Carina Schrempf	Austria	+ 14' 49"
49	Sandra Alonso	Spain	+ 14' 15"
50	Teniel Campbell	Trinidad and Tobago	+ 14' 49"
51	Ella Wyllie	New Zealand	+ 14' 49"
52	Franziska Koch	Germany	+ 14' 49"
53	Arlenis Sierra	Cuba	+ 14' 49"
54	Eugenia Bujak	Slovenia	+ 14' 18"
55	Niamh Fisher-Black	New Zealand	+ 14' 18"
56	Tereza Neumanová	Czech Republic	+ 14' 18"
57	Alexandra Manly	Australia	+ 14' 18"
58	Emilia Fahlin	Sweden	+ 14' 18"
57	Claire Steels	United Kingdom	+ 14' 49"
57	Marie Schreiber	Luxembourg	+ 14' 49"
57	Noëlle Rüetschi	Switzerland	+ 14' 49"
62	Eliška Kvasničková	Czech Republic	+ 14' 49"
63	Maggie Coles-Lyster	Australia	+ 14' 49"
64	Kimberley Le Court	Mauritius	+ 14' 49"
65	Zeng Luyao	China	+ 14' 49"
66	Marthe Truyen	Belgium	+ 14' 49"
67	Ricarda Bauernfeind	Germany	+ 14' 49"
68	Lara Gillespie	Ireland	+ 14' 49"
69	Sanne Cant	Belgium	+ 14' 49"
70	Elena Hartmann	Switzerland	+ 14' 58"
71	Rasa Leleivytė	Lithuania	+ 14' 58"
72	Leun Wing Yee	Singapore	+ 14' 58"
73	Léa Curinier	France	+ 14' 58"
74	Antonia Niedermaier	Germany	+ 15' 01"
75	Lilibeth Chacón	Venezuela	+ 15' 01"
76	Amalie Lutro	Norway	+ 15' 04"
77	Yanina Kuskova	Uzbekistan	+ 15' 04"
78	Kim Cadzow	New Zealand	+ 15' 05"
79	Megan Armitage	Ireland	+ 15' 05"
80	Olha Kulynych	Ukraine	+ 15' 05"
81	Diana Peñuela	Colombia	+ 15' 05"
82	Marcela Prieto	Mexico	+ 15' 05"
83	Sara Poidevin	Canada	+ 15' 09"
84	Mischa Bredewold	Netherlands	+ 15' 21"
85	Marte Berg Edseth	Norway	+ 19' 46"
86	Julia Borgström	Sweden	+ 19' 46"

Rank	Rider	Country	Time
	Eleonora Camilla Gasparrini	Italy	DNF
	Ingvild Gaskjenn	Norway	DNF
	Alice Sharpe	Ireland	DNF
	Ally Wollaston	New Zealand	DNF
	Nina Berton	Luxembourg	DNF
	Miryam Núñez	Ecuador	DNF
	Anna Henderson	United Kingdom	DNF
	Aude Biannic	France	DNF
	Clara Copponi	France	DNF
	Amanda Spratt	Australia	DNF
	Urška Žigart	Slovenia	DNF
	Tiffany Keep	South Africa	DNF
	Katrine Aalerud	Norway	DNF
	Olga Zabelinskaya	Uzbekistan	DNF
	Yuliia Biriukova	Ukraine	DNF
	Anabel Yapura	Argentina	DNF
	Amalie Dideriksen	Denmark	DNF
	Linda Zanetti	Switzerland	DNF
	Julie van de Velde	Belgium	DNF
	Sara Martín	Spain	DNF
	Noemi Rüegg	Switzerland	DNF
	Rebecca Koerner	Denmark	DNF
	Anniina Ahtosalo	Finland	DNF
	Solbjørk Minke Anderson	Denmark	DNF
	Christine Majerus	Luxembourg	DNF
	Daniela Campos	Portugal	DNF
	Diane Ingabire	Rwanda	DNF
	Heidi Franz	United States	DNF
	Agua Marina Espínola	Paraguay	DNF
	Lily Williams	United States	DNF
	Alba Teruel	Spain	DNF
	Nora Jenčušová	Slovakia	DNF
	Nofar Maoz	Israel	DNF
	Makhabbat Umutzhanova	Kazakhstan	DNF
	Andrea Ramírez	Mexico	DNF
	Andrea Alzate	Colombia	DNF
	Tang Xin	China	DNF
	Selam Amha	Ethiopia	DNF
	Maude Le Roux	South Africa	DNF
	Antri Christoforou	Cyprus	DNF
	Margarita Misyurina	Uzbekistan	DNF
	Caitlin Conyers	Bermuda	DNF
	Petra Zsankó	Hungary	DNF
	Malin Eriksen	Norway	DNF
	Skye Davidson	Zimbabwe	DNF
	Fariba Hashimi	Afghanistan	DNF
	Brodie Chapman	Australia	DNF
	Lorena Wiebes	Netherlands	DNF
	Akari Kobayashi	Japan	DNS
	Michaela Drummond	New Zealand	DNF
	Georgia Baker	Australia	DNF
	Urška Pintar	Slovenia	DNF
	Elisa Winter	Austria	DNF
	Leila Gschwentner	Austria	DNF
	Catalina Soto	Chile	DNF
	Barbara Guarischi	Italy	DNF
	Sarah Roy	Australia	DNF
	Victoire Berteau	France	DNF
	Cédrine Kerbaol	France	DNF
	Lizzie Holden	United Kingdom	DNF
	Marta Jaskulska	Poland	DNF
	Marita Jensen	Denmark	DNF
	Emma Norsgaard Jørgensen	Denmark	DNF
	Coryn Labecki	United States	DNF
	Skylar Schneider	United States	DNF
	Sheyla Gutierrez	Spain	DNF
	Frances Janse van Rensburg	South Africa	DNF
	Hayley Preen	South Africa	DNF
	Sofiya Karimova	Uzbekistan	DNF
	Nafosat Kozieva	Uzbekistan	DNF
	Olga Shekel	Ukraine	DNF
	Kristýna Burlová	Czech Republic	DNF
	Jazilla Mwamikazi	Rwanda	DNF
	Xaveline Nirere	Rwanda	DNF
	Chaniporn Batriya	Thailand	DNF
	Kamonrada Khaoplot	Thailand	DNF
	Sun Jiajun	China	DNF
	Vera Vilaça	Portugal	DNF
	Aurélie Halbwachs	Mauritius	DNF
	Raphaëlle Lamusse	Mauritius	DNF
	Nesrine Houili	Algeria	DNF
	Monique du Plessis	Namibia	DNF
	Melissa Hinz	Namibia	DNF
	Ana Vitória Magalhães	Brazil	DNF
	Rotem Gafinovitz	Israel	DNF
	Ayustina Delia Priatna	India	DNF
	Safia Al Sayegh	United Arab Emirates	DNF
	Faina Potapova	Kazakhstan	DNF
	Rinata Sultanova	Kazakhstan	DNF
	Lee Sze Wing	Hong Kong	DNF
	Yang Qianyu	Hong Kong	DNF
	Tombrapa Grikpa	Nigeria	DNF
	Mary Samuel	Nigeria	DNF
	Ese Ukpeseraye	Nigeria	DNF
	Vanessa Santeliz	Venezuela	DNF
	Dana Rožlapa	Latvia	DNF
	Raja Chakir	Morocco	DNF
	Helen Mitchell	Zimbabwe	DNF
	Aikaterini Eleftheriadou	Greece	DNF
	Ebtissam Mohamed	Egypt	DNF
	Yareli Acevedo	Mexico	DNF
	Faranak Partoazar	Iran	DNF
	Silja Jóhannesdóttir	Iceland	DNF
	Hafdís Sigurðardóttir	Iceland	DNF
	Kristin Edda Sveinsdóttir	Iceland	DNF
	Dunja Ivanova	North Macedonia	DNF
	Elena Petrova	North Macedonia	DNF
	Yulduz Hashimi	Afghanistan	DNF
	Zahra Rezayee	Afghanistan	DNF
	Olympia aduro Fahie	British Virgin Islands	DNF
	Luciana Roland	Argentina	DNF
	Bucumi Beolyne	Burundi	DNF
	Emmanuella Rukundo	Burundi	DNF
	Julia Mirigu	Kenya	DNF
	Florence Nakagwa	Kenya	DNF
	Fanny Cauchois One	Laos	DNF
	Awa Bamogo	Burkina Faso	DNF
	Katarzyna Niewiadoma	Poland	DNS
	Chloé Dygert	United States	DNS
	Zanri Rossouw	South Africa	DNS
	Jenny Rissveds	Sweden	DNS
