= UCI Road World Championships – Women's under-23 time trial =

World championship individual time trial race for women aged 23 or under

The UCI Road World Championships - Women's under-23 time trial is the annual world championship for road bicycle racing in the discipline of individual time trial for women aged under 23 at the beginning of the relevant calendar year, organised by the world governing body, the Union Cycliste Internationale. The event was first run in 2022. Through 2024, it had been run simultaneously with the elite women's time trial event, and it was possible, although it never happened, for a rider to gain a medal in both categories from the one event. Beginning in 2025, the under-23 women have their own race.

== Medal winners ==
Championships	Gold	Silver	Bronze
2022 Wollongong	Vittoria Guazzini; Italy	Shirin van Anrooij; Netherlands	Ricarda Bauernfeind; Germany
2023 Glasgow	Antonia Niedermaier; Germany	Cédrine Kerbaol; France	Julie De Wilde; Belgium
2024 Zurich	Antonia Niedermaier; Germany	Jasmin Liechti; Switzerland	Julie De Wilde; Belgium
2025 Kigali	Zoe Backstedt; Great Britain	Viktória Chladoňová; Slovakia	Federica Venturelli; Italy

=== Medallists by nation ===
Rank	Nation	Gold	Silver	Bronze	Total
1	Germany	2	0	1	3
2	Italy	1	0	1	2
3	Great Britain	1	0	0	1
4	France	0	1	0	1
4	Netherlands	0	1	0	1
4	Slovakia	0	1	0	1
4	Switzerland	0	1	0	1
8	Belgium	0	0	2	2
Totals (8 entries)		4	4	4	12
