= 2023 Tour de Romandie Féminin =

2023 UCI Women's World Tour, race 25 of 27

Race details
- Dates: 15–17 September
- Stages: 3
- Distance: 386.8 km (240.3 mi)
- Winning time: 10h 12' 50"

Results
Jersey awarded to the overall winner	Winner	Demi Vollering (NED)	(SD Worx)
	Second	Katarzyna Niewiadoma (POL)	(Canyon//SRAM)
	Third	Marlen Reusser (SUI)	(SD Worx)
Jersey awarded to the points classification winner	Points	Sofia Bertizzolo (ITA)	(UAE Team ADQ)
Jersey awarded to the mountains classification winner	Mountains	Loes Adegeest (NED)	(FDJ–Suez)
Jersey awarded to the youth classification winner	Youth	Ricarda Bauernfeind (GER)	(Canyon//SRAM)
	Team	(Netherlands) SD Worx	

The 2023 Tour de Romandie Féminin was the 2nd edition of the Tour de Romandie Féminin road cycling stage race, which was part of the 2023 UCI Women's World Tour. It began on 15 September in Yverdon-les-Bains and finished on 17 September in Nyon.

== Teams ==
Fourteen UCI Women's WorldTeams, two UCI Women's Continental Teams and one national team made up the seventeen teams that took part in the race.

UCI Women's WorldTeams

- SD Worx
- Movistar Team
- Canyon//SRAM
- Lidl–Trek
- Team dsm–firmenich
- FDJ–Suez
- UAE Team ADQ
- Team Jumbo–Visma
- Fenix–Deceuninck
- Team Jayco–AlUla
- Liv Racing TeqFind
- Israel Premier Tech Roland
- EF Education–Tibco–SVB
- Human Powered Health

UCI Women's Continental Teams

- AG Insurance–Soudal–Quick-Step
- Ceratizit–WNT Pro Cycling

National team

- Switzerland

== Route ==
Stage characteristics and winners
Stage	Date	Course	Distance	Type	Stage winner
1	15 September	Yverdon-les-Bains to Yverdon-les-Bains	144.1 km (89.5 mi)	Hilly stage	Sofia Bertizzolo (ITA)
2	16 September	Romont to Torgon	110.8 km (68.8 mi)	Mountain stage	Demi Vollering (NED)
3	17 September	Vernier to Nyon	131.9 km (82.0 mi)	Hilly stage	Liane Lippert (GER)
Total			386.8 km (240.3 mi)		

== Stages ==
=== Stage 1 ===
15 September — Yverdon-les-Bains to Yverdon-les-Bains, 144.1 km (89.5 mi)

Stage 1 Result
Rank	Rider	Team	Time
1	Sofia Bertizzolo (ITA)	UAE Team ADQ	3h 53' 10"
2	Carina Schrempf (AUT)	Fenix–Deceuninck	+ 0"
3	Mischa Bredewold (NED)	SD Worx	+ 0"
4	Soraya Paladin (ITA)	Canyon//SRAM	+ 0"
5	Fem van Empel (NED)	Team Jumbo–Visma	+ 0"
6	Jelena Erić (SRB)	Movistar Team	+ 0"
7	Ruby Roseman-Gannon (AUS)	Team Jayco–AlUla	+ 0"
8	Elise Chabbey (SUI)	Canyon//SRAM	+ 0"
9	Loes Adegeest (NED)	FDJ–Suez	+ 0"
10	Marta Lach (POL)	Ceratizit–WNT Pro Cycling	+ 0"

General classification after Stage 1
Rank	Rider	Team	Time
1	Sofia Bertizzolo (ITA)	UAE Team ADQ	3h 53' 00"
2	Carina Schrempf (AUT)	Fenix–Deceuninck	+ 4"
3	Mischa Bredewold (NED)	SD Worx	+ 6"
4	Soraya Paladin (ITA)	Canyon//SRAM	+ 10"
5	Fem van Empel (NED)	Team Jumbo–Visma	+ 10"
6	Jelena Erić (SRB)	Movistar Team	+ 10"
7	Ruby Roseman-Gannon (AUS)	Team Jayco–AlUla	+ 10"
8	Elise Chabbey (SUI)	Canyon//SRAM	+ 10"
9	Loes Adegeest (NED)	FDJ–Suez	+ 10"
10	Marta Lach (POL)	Ceratizit–WNT Pro Cycling	+ 10"

=== Stage 2 ===
16 September — Romont to Torgon, 110.8 km (68.8 mi)

Stage 2 Result
Rank	Rider	Team	Time
1	Demi Vollering (NED)	SD Worx	3h 01' 19"
2	Katarzyna Niewiadoma (POL)	Canyon//SRAM	+ 2"
3	Marlen Reusser (SUI)	SD Worx	+ 6"
4	Juliette Labous (FRA)	Team dsm–firmenich	+ 17"
5	Niamh Fisher-Black (NZL)	SD Worx	+ 27"
6	Silvia Persico (ITA)	UAE Team ADQ	+ 1' 06"
7	Ricarda Bauernfeind (GER)	Canyon//SRAM	+ 1' 06"
8	Erica Magnaldi (ITA)	UAE Team ADQ	+ 1' 06"
9	Anna Shackley (GBR)	SD Worx	+ 1' 06"
10	Gaia Realini (ITA)	Lidl–Trek	+ 1' 08"

General classification after Stage 2
Rank	Rider	Team	Time
1	Demi Vollering (NED)	SD Worx	6h 54' 19"
2	Katarzyna Niewiadoma (POL)	Canyon//SRAM	+ 6"
3	Marlen Reusser (SUI)	SD Worx	+ 12"
4	Juliette Labous (FRA)	Team dsm–firmenich	+ 27"
5	Niamh Fisher-Black (NZL)	SD Worx	+ 37"
6	Silvia Persico (ITA)	UAE Team ADQ	+ 1' 16"
7	Ricarda Bauernfeind (GER)	Canyon//SRAM	+ 1' 16"
8	Anna Shackley (GBR)	SD Worx	+ 1' 16"
9	Erica Magnaldi (ITA)	UAE Team ADQ	+ 1' 16"
10	Gaia Realini (ITA)	Lidl–Trek	+ 1' 18"

=== Stage 3 ===
17 September — Vernier to Nyon, 131.9 km (82.0 mi)

Stage 3 Result
Rank	Rider	Team	Time
1	Liane Lippert (GER)	Movistar Team	3h 18' 31"
2	Fem van Empel (NED)	Team Jumbo–Visma	+ 0"
3	Silvia Persico (ITA)	UAE Team ADQ	+ 0"
4	Marlen Reusser (SUI)	SD Worx	+ 0"
5	Ashleigh Moolman-Pasio (RSA)	AG Insurance–Soudal–Quick-Step	+ 0"
6	Demi Vollering (NED)	SD Worx	+ 0"
7	Katarzyna Niewiadoma (POL)	Canyon//SRAM	+ 0"
8	Juliette Labous (FRA)	Team dsm–firmenich	+ 0"
9	Yara Kastelijn (NED)	Fenix–Deceuninck	+ 0"
10	Ane Santesteban (ESP)	Team Jayco–AlUla	+ 0"

General classification after Stage 3
Rank	Rider	Team	Time
1	Demi Vollering (NED)	SD Worx	10h 12' 50"
2	Katarzyna Niewiadoma (POL)	Canyon//SRAM	+ 6"
3	Marlen Reusser (SUI)	SD Worx	+ 12"
4	Juliette Labous (FRA)	Team dsm–firmenich	+ 27"
5	Silvia Persico (ITA)	UAE Team ADQ	+ 1' 12"
6	Ricarda Bauernfeind (GER)	Canyon//SRAM	+ 1' 16"
7	Anna Shackley (GBR)	SD Worx	+ 1' 16"
8	Erica Magnaldi (ITA)	UAE Team ADQ	+ 1' 16"
9	Gaia Realini (ITA)	Lidl–Trek	+ 1' 18"
10	Niamh Fisher-Black (NZL)	SD Worx	+ 1' 40"

== Classification leadership table ==
Classification leadership by stage
Stage	Winner	General classification	Points classification	Mountains classification	Young rider classification	Team classification
1	Sofia Bertizzolo	Sofia Bertizzolo	Sofia Bertizzolo	Loes Adegeest	Mischa Bredewold	Canyon//SRAM
2	Demi Vollering	Demi Vollering	Sofia Bertizzolo	Jolanda Neff	Niamh Fisher-Black	SD Worx
3	Liane Lippert	Demi Vollering	Sofia Bertizzolo	Loes Adegeest	Ricarda Bauernfeind	SD Worx
Final		Demi Vollering	Sofia Bertizzolo	Loes Adegeest	Ricarda Bauernfeind	Team SD Worx

== Classification standings ==
Legend
Denotes the winner of the general classification	Denotes the winner of the mountains classification
Denotes the winner of the points classification	Denotes the winner of the young rider classification

=== General classification ===
Final general classification (1–10)
Rank	Rider	Team	Time
1	Demi Vollering (NED)	SD Worx	10h 12' 50"
2	Katarzyna Niewiadoma (POL)	Canyon//SRAM	+ 6"
3	Marlen Reusser (SUI)	SD Worx	+ 12"
4	Juliette Labous (FRA)	Team dsm–firmenich	+ 27"
5	Silvia Persico (ITA)	UAE Team ADQ	+ 1' 12"
6	Ricarda Bauernfeind (GER)	Canyon//SRAM	+ 1' 16"
7	Anna Shackley (GBR)	SD Worx	+ 1' 16"
8	Erica Magnaldi (ITA)	UAE Team ADQ	+ 1' 16"
9	Gaia Realini (ITA)	Lidl–Trek	+ 1' 18"
10	Niamh Fisher-Black (NZL)	SD Worx	+ 1' 40"

=== Points classification ===
Final points classification (1–10)
Rank	Rider	Team	Points
1	Sofia Bertizzolo (ITA)	UAE Team ADQ	80
2	Silvia Persico (ITA)	UAE Team ADQ	51
3	Demi Vollering (NED)	SD Worx	50
4	Liane Lippert (GER)	Movistar Team	50
5	Fem van Empel (NED)	Team Jumbo–Visma	48
6	Marlen Reusser (SUI)	SD Worx	40
7	Katarzyna Niewiadoma (POL)	Canyon//SRAM	37
8	Carina Schrempf (AUT)	Fenix–Deceuninck	36
9	Clara Honsinger (USA)	EF Education–Tibco–SVB	30
10	Juliette Labous (FRA)	Team dsm–firmenich	29

=== Mountains classification ===
Final mountains classification (1–10)
Rank	Rider	Team	Points
1	Loes Adegeest (NED)	FDJ–Suez	22
2	Niamh Fisher-Black (NZL)	SD Worx	20
3	Katarzyna Niewiadoma (POL)	Canyon//SRAM	19
4	Jolanda Neff (SUI)	Switzerland	18
5	Demi Vollering (NED)	SD Worx	12
6	Mireia Benito (ESP)	AG Insurance–Soudal–Quick-Step	10
7	Marlen Reusser (SUI)	SD Worx	6
8	Juliette Labous (FRA)	Team dsm–firmenich	6
9	Elise Chabbey (SUI)	Canyon//SRAM	6
10	Liane Lippert (GER)	Movistar Team	5

=== Young rider classification ===
Final young rider classification (1–10)
Rank	Rider	Team	Time
1	Ricarda Bauernfeind (GER)	Canyon//SRAM	10h 14' 06"
2	Anna Shackley (GBR)	SD Worx	+ 0"
3	Gaia Realini (ITA)	Lidl–Trek	+ 2"
4	Niamh Fisher-Black (NZL)	SD Worx	+ 24"
5	Fem van Empel (NED)	Team Jumbo–Visma	+ 1' 11"
6	Antonia Niedermaier (GER)	Canyon//SRAM	+ 1' 17"
7	Kim Cadzow (NZL)	Team Jumbo–Visma	+ 2' 55"
8	Petra Stiasny (SUI)	Fenix–Deceuninck	+ 5' 15"
9	Caroline Andersson (SWE)	Liv Racing TeqFind	+ 10' 44"
10	Ginia Caluori (SUI)	Switzerland	+ 11' 48"

=== Team classification ===
Final team classification (1–10)
Rank	Team	Time
1	(Netherlands) SD Worx	30h 39' 33"
2	(Germany) Canyon//SRAM	+ 2' 17"
3	(United Arab Emirates) UAE Team ADQ	+ 8' 09"
4	(Netherlands) Team dsm–firmenich	+ 9' 14"
5	(Belgium) Fenix–Deceuninck	+ 10' 12"
6	(Netherlands) Team Jumbo–Visma	+ 10' 35"
7	(Spain) Movistar Team	+ 17' 55"
8	Switzerland	+ 25' 22"
9	(Australia) Team Jayco–AlUla	+ 26' 32"
10	(Netherlands) Liv Racing TeqFind	+ 44' 05"
