= 2025 UCI Road World Championships – Women's road race =

Cycling event

Women's road race
2025 UCI Road World Championships

Race details
- Dates: 27 September 2025
- Distance: 164.6 km (102.3 mi)
- Winning time: 4h 34' 48"

Medalists
	Gold	(Canada) Magdeleine Vallieres (CAN)
	Silver	(New Zealand) Niamh Fisher-Black (NZL)
	Bronze	(Spain) Mavi García (ESP)

The Women's road race of the 2025 UCI Road World Championships was a cycling event that took place on 27 September 2025 in Kigali, Rwanda. It was the 65th edition of the championship, for which Lotte Kopecky of Belgium was the defending champion, having won in 2024.

== Final classification ==
Rank	Position in the road race
Time	Time taken to complete the road race
DNS	Denotes a rider who did not start
DNF	Denotes a rider who did not finish
DSQ	Denotes a rider who was disqualified from the race
OTL	Denotes a rider who finished outside the time limit

Rank	Rider	Country	Time
1st place, gold medalist(s)	Magdeleine Vallieres	Canada	4h 34' 48"
2nd place, silver medalist(s)	Niamh Fisher-Black	New Zealand	+ 23"
3rd place, bronze medalist(s)	Mavi García	Spain	+ 27"
4	Elise Chabbey	Switzerland	+ 41"
5	Riejanne Markus	Netherlands	+ 57"
6	Antonia Niedermaier	Germany	+ 1' 17"
7	Demi Vollering	Netherlands	+ 1' 34"
8	Kimberley Le Court	Mauritius	+ 1' 34"
9	Marlen Reusser	Switzerland	+ 1' 34"
10	Kasia Niewiadoma	Poland	+ 1' 34"
11	Caroline Andersson	Sweden	+ 1' 34"
12	Franziska Koch	Germany	+ 1' 36"
13	Juliette Labous	France	+ 1' 39"
14	Katrine Aalerud	Norway	+ 1' 44"
15	Elisa Longo Borghini	Italy	+ 1' 50"
16	Pauline Ferrand-Prevot	France	+ 1' 50"
17	Chloe Dygert	United States	+ 1' 54"
18	Barbara Malcotti	Italy	+ 1' 58"
19	Brodie Chapman	Australia	+ 2' 04"
20	Noemi Ruegg	Switzerland	+ 2' 16"
21	Ginia Caluori	Switzerland	+ 2' 18"
22	Mireia Benito	Spain	+ 2' 19"
23	Urška Žigart	Slovenia	+ 2' 29"
24	Ella Wyllie	New Zealand	+ 2' 59"
25	Yuliia Biriukova	Ukraine	+ 4' 16"
26	Évita Muzic	France	+ 4' 21"
27	Shirin van Anrooij	Netherlands	+ 4' 42"
28	Sigrid Ytterhus Haugset	Norway	+ 5' 06"
29	Ashleigh Moolman Pasio	South Africa	+ 6' 26"
30	Amanda Spratt	Australia	+ 6' 26"
31	Cedrine Kerbaol	France	+ 8' 15"
32	Jasmin Liechti	Switzerland	+ 8' 37"
33	Lauretta Hanson	Australia	+ 9' 13"
34	Pauliena Rooijakkers	Netherlands	+ 10' 45"
35	Sara Martín	Spain	+ 11' 31"
36	Marie Le Net	France	+ 11' 31"
37	Blanka Vas	Hungary	+ 11' 31"
38	Anna van der Breggen	Netherlands	+ 11' 31"
39	Wing Yee Leung	Hong Kong	+ 11' 31"
40	Marta Lach	Poland	+ 11' 31"
41	Julie van de Velde	Belgium	+ 12' 58"
42	Monica Trinca Colonel	Italy	+ 12' 58"
43	Margot Vanpachtenbeke	Belgium	+ 12' 58"
44	Yara Kastelijn	Netherlands	+ 12' 58"
45	Gabriela Soto	Guatemala	+ 16' 00"
46	Marieke Meert	Belgium	+ 16' 14"
47	Femke de Vries	Netherlands	+ 16' 14"
48	Carina Schrempf	Austria	+ 16' 14"
49	Karolina Perekitko	Poland	+ 16' 16"
50	Paula Patiño	Colombia	+ 16' 16"
51	Olha Kulynych	Ukraine	+ 16' 20"
52	Ruby Roseman-Gannon	Australia	+ 16' 21"
53	Olivia Baril	Canada	+ 16' 21"

Rank	Rider	Country	Time
	Liane Lippert	Germany	DNF
	Maeva Squiban	France	DNF
	Lea Curinier	France	DNF
	Serkalem Watango	Ethiopia	DNF
	Eleonora Gasparrini	Italy	DNF
	Alison Jackson	Canada	DNF
	Émilie Fortin	Canada	DNF
	Lilibeth Chacón	Venezuela	DNF
	Diana Peñuela	Colombia	DNF
	Solbjork Anderson	Denmark	DNF
	Xaveline Nirere	Rwanda	DNF
	Zhang Hao	China	DNF
	Ruth Edwards	United States	DNF
	Alexandra Manly	Australia	DNF
	Usoa Ostolaza	Spain	DNF
	Ane Santesteban	Spain	DNF
	Silvia Persico	Italy	DNF
	Francesca Barale	Italy	DNF
	Soraya Paladin	Italy	DNF
	Romina Hinojosa	Mexico	DNF
	Varvara Fasoi	Greece	DNF
	Haftu Reda	Ethiopia	DNF
	Teniel Campbell	Trinidad and Tobago	DNF
	Yanina Kuskova	Uzbekistan	DNF
	Maude Le Roux	South Africa	DNF
	Alicia González Blanco	Spain	DNF
	Diane Ingabire	Rwanda	DNF
	Natalia Frolova	Individual Neutral Athletes	DNF
	Brhan Abrha	Ethiopia	DNF
	S'Annara Grove	South Africa	DNF
	Zeng Luyao	China	DNF
	Faina Potapova	Kazakhstan	DNF
	Violette Irakoze	Rwanda	DNF
	Akpeiil Ossim	Kazakhstan	DNF
	Yulduz Hashimi	Afghanistan	DNF
	Laury Milette	Canada	DNF
	Valentine Nzayisenga	Rwanda	DNF
	Jamila Abdullah	Tanzania	DNF
	Monica Jelimo Kiplagat	Kenya	DNF
	Kendra Masiga	Kenya	DNF
	Hermionne Ahouissou	Benin	DNF
	Rainatou Kpovihouede	Benin	DNF
	Namukasa Trinitah	Uganda	DNF
	Nancy Akinyi Debe	Kenya	DNF
	Lobopo Kono	Botswana	DNF
	Lucie de Marigny-Lagesse	Mauritius	DNF
	Anta Ndiaye	Senegal	DNF
	Najma Najma	Comoros	DNF
	Dodo Humberto Ié	Guinea-Bissau	DNF
	Mamadama Bangoura	Guinea	DNF
	Aurelie Halbwachs	Mauritius	DNS
