= 2023 UCI Road World Championships – Women's time trial =

Cycling event

Women's time trial
2023 UCI Road World Championships

Race details
- Dates: 10 August 2023
- Distance: 36.2 km (22.5 mi)
- Winning time: 46' 59"

Medalists
	Gold	(United States) Chloé Dygert (USA)
	Silver	(Australia) Grace Brown (AUS)
	Bronze	(Austria) Christina Schweinberger (AUT)

The Women's time trial of the 2023 UCI Road World Championships was a cycling event that took place on 10 August 2023 in Stirling, Scotland. It was the 30th edition of the championship, for which Ellen van Dijk of Netherlands was the defending champion, having won in 2022.

== Participating nations ==
86 cyclists from 55 nations competed in the event. The number of cyclists per nation is shown in parentheses.

- Afghanistan (2)
- Algeria (1)
- Argentina (2)
- Australia (2)
- Austria (2)
- Belgium (2)
- Bermuda (1)
- Bolivia (1)
- British Virgin Islands (1)
- Burkina Faso (1)
- Canada (2)
- Chile (1)
- China (2)
- Colombia (1)
- Cyprus (1)
- Czech Republic (2)
- Denmark (2)
- Ethiopia (1)
- Finland (2)
- France (2)
- Germany (2)
- Great Britain (2)
- Hungary (1)
- Iceland (2)
- Indonesia (1)
- Ireland (1)
- Israel (1)
- Italy (2)
- Kazakhstan (2)
- Kenya (1)
- Laos (1)
- Latvia (1)
- Luxembourg (1)
- Hong Kong (2)
- Mauritius (1)
- Netherlands (2)
- Nigeria (2)
- North Macedonia (2)
- New Zealand (3)
- Panama (1)
- Paraguay (1)
- Poland (2)
- Rwanda (1)
- Slovakia (1)
- Slovenia (2)
- South Africa (1)
- Spain (2)
- Switzerland (2)
- Trinidad and Tobago (1)
- Uganda (1)
- Ukraine (2)
- United States (3)
- Uzbekistan (2)
- Zimbabwe (2)
- UCI Refugee Team (1)

=== Continental champions ===
Name	Country	Reason
Ellen van Dijk	Netherlands	Incumbent World Champion
Aurelie Halbwachs	Mauritius	African Champion
Amber Neben	United States	Panamerican Champion
Olga Zabelinskaya	Uzbekistan	Asian Champion
Georgia Perry	New Zealand	Oceanian Champion

== Final classification ==
Legend
No.	Starting number worn by the rider during the Race
Pos.	Position in the time trial
Time	Deficit to the winner of the time trial
DNS	Denotes a rider who did not start
DNF	Denotes a rider who did not finish
DSQ	Denotes a rider who was disqualified from the race
OTL	Denotes a rider who finished outside the time limit

Rank	Rider	Country	Time
1st place, gold medalist(s)	Chloé Dygert	United States	46' 59"
2nd place, silver medalist(s)	Grace Brown	Australia	+ 5"
3rd place, bronze medalist(s)	Christina Schweinberger	Austria	+ 1' 12"
4	Anna Henderson	United Kingdom	+ 1' 15"
5	Juliette Labous	France	+ 1' 22"
6	Demi Vollering	Netherlands	+ 1' 27"
7	Agnieszka Skalniak-Sójka	Poland	+ 1' 38"
8	Amber Neben	United States	+ 1' 51"
9	Riejanne Markus	Netherlands	+ 2' 07"
10	Georgie Howe	Australia	+ 2' 26"
11	Antonia Niedermaier	Germany	+ 2' 27"
12	Eugenia Bujak	Slovenia	+ 2' 29"
13	Cédrine Kerbaol	France	+ 2' 35"
14	Lizzie Holden	United Kingdom	+ 2' 45"
15	Anna Kiesenhofer	Austria	+ 2' 53"
16	Emma Norsgaard	Denmark	+ 2' 56"
17	Julie De Wilde	Belgium	+ 3' 06"
18	Mieke Kröger	Germany	+ 3' 07"
19	Olivia Baril	Canada	+ 3' 11"
20	Georgia Williams	New Zealand	+ 3' 11"
21	Teniel Campbell	Trinidad and Tobago	+ 3' 12"
22	Lauren Stephens	United States	+ 3' 27"
23	Elena Hartmann	Switzerland	+ 3' 28"
24	Alessia Vigilia	Italy	+ 3' 40"
25	Paula Findlay	Canada	+ 3' 40"
26	Olga Zabelinskaya	Uzbekistan	+ 3' 42"
27	Cecilie Uttrup Ludwig	Denmark	+ 3' 44"
28	Valeriia Kononenko	Ukraine	+ 3' 45"
29	Urška Žigart	Slovenia	+ 3' 59"
30	Kelly Murphy	Ireland	+ 4' 01"
31	Dana Rožlapa	Latvia	+ 4' 08"
32	Vittoria Guazzini	Italy	+ 4' 16"
33	Georgia Perry	New Zealand	+ 4' 33"
34	Anniina Ahtosalo	Finland	+ 4' 35"
35	Marta Lach	Poland	+ 4' 40"
36	Petra Zsankó	Hungary	+ 4' 41"
37	Diana Peñuela	Colombia	+ 4' 43"
38	Nora Jenčušová	Slovakia	+ 5' 00"
39	Antri Christoforou	Cyprus	+ 5' 04"
40	Eliska Kvasničková	Czech Republic	+ 5' 18"
41	Agua Marina Espínola	Paraguay	+ 5' 29"
42	Sandra Alonso	Spain	+ 5' 35"
43	Sara Martín	Spain	+ 5' 40"
44	Ella Wyllie	New Zealand	+ 5' 46"
45	Caitlin Conyers	Bermuda	+ 5' 53"
46	Febe Jooris	Belgium	+ 5' 54"
47	Rotem Gafinovitz	Israel	+ 5' 57"
48	Zanri Rossouw	South Africa	+ 6' 01"
49	Nina Berton	Luxembourg	+ 6' 07"
50	Kristýna Burlová	Czech Republic	+ 6' 15"
51	Tetiana Yashchenko	Ukraine	+ 6' 19"
52	Hafdís Sigurðardóttir	Iceland	+ 6' 22"
53	Lotta Henttala	Finland	+ 6' 23"
54	Catalina Soto	Chile	+ 6' 33"
55	Rinata Sultanova	Kazakhstan	+ 6' 41"
56	Anabel Yapura	Argentina	+ 6' 47"
57	Lu Siying	China	+ 6' 56"
58	Selam Amha Gerefiel	Ethiopia	+ 6' 56"
59	Aurelie Halbwachs	Mauritius	+ 7' 39"
60	Diane Ingabire	Rwanda	+ 7' 42"
61	Makhabbat Umutzhanova	Kazakhstan	+ 8' 24"
62	Margarita Misyurina	Uzbekistan	+ 8' 25"
63	Cui Yuhang	China	+ 8' 39"
64	Annibel Emilia Prieto	Panama	+ 8' 55"
65	Yang Qianyu	Hong Kong	+ 9' 10"
66	Fariba Hashimi	Afghanistan	+ 9' 18"
67	Leung Wing Yee	Hong Kong	+ 9' 23"
68	Kristin Edda Sveinsdóttir	Iceland	+ 9' 41"
69	Nesrine Houili	Algeria	+ 10' 07"
70	Elena Petrova	North Macedonia	+ 10' 15"
71	Skye Davidson	Zimbabwe	+ 10' 32"
72	Luciana Roland	Argentina	+ 10' 47"
73	Ayustina Delia Priatna	Indonesia	+ 10' 56"
74	Dunja Ivanova	North Macedonia	+ 11' 10"
75	Abigail Sarabia	Bolivia	+ 11' 23"
76	Awa Bamogo	Burkina Faso	+ 12' 44"
77	Fanny Cauchois One	Laos	+ 13' 12"
78	Julia Miruigu	Kenya	+ 14' 00"
79	Grace Ayuba	Nigeria	+ 16' 46"
80	Mary Samuel	Nigeria	+ 17' 27"
81	Helen Mitchell	Zimbabwe	+ 18' 11"
82	Florence Nakagwa	Zimbabwe	+ 18' 49"
83	Arefa Amini	Afghanistan	+ 21' 49"
84	Masomah Ali Zada	UCI Refugee Team	+ 22' 46"
85	Olympia Maduro Fahie	British Virgin Islands	+ 26' 11"
—	Marlen Reusser	Switzerland	DNF
