= 2023 UCI Road World Championships – Mixed team relay =

Cycling event

Mixed team relay
2023 UCI Road World Championships

Race details
- Dates: 8 August 2023
- Distance: 40.3 km (25.0 mi)
- Winning time: 54:16.20

Medalists
	Gold	Switzerland
	Silver	France
	Bronze	Germany

The mixed team relay of the 2023 UCI Road World Championships was a cycling event that took place on 8 August 2023 in Glasgow, Great Britain. It was won by Switzerland.

== Final classification ==
Rank	Riders	Team	Time	Behind
1st place, gold medalist(s)	Mauro Schmid; Stefan Küng; Stefan Bissegger; Elise Chabbey; Marlen Reusser; Nicole Koller	Switzerland	54:16.20	–
2nd place, silver medalist(s)	Bruno Armirail; Rémi Cavagna; Bryan Coquard; Audrey Cordon-Ragot; Cédrine Kerbaol; Juliette Labous	France	54:23.28	+7.08
3rd place, bronze medalist(s)	Miguel Heidemann; Jannik Steimle; Maximilian Walscheid; Ricarda Bauernfeind; Lisa Klein; Franziska Koch	Germany	55:07.51	+51.31
4	Daniel Bigham; Josh Charlton; Ethan Vernon; Elynor Backstedt; Pfeiffer Georgi; Anna Shackley	Great Britain	55:19.62	+1:03.42
5	Alberto Bettiol; Mattia Cattaneo; Manlio Moro; Letizia Paternoster; Silvia Persico; Alessia Vigilia	Italy	55:33.21	+1:17.01
6	Luke Durbridge; Michael Matthews; Luke Plapp; Lauretta Hanson; Brodie Chapman; Sarah Roy	Australia	55:53.99	+1:37.79
7	Daan Hoole; Tim van Dijke; Jos van Emden; Loes Adegeest; Shirin van Anrooij; Riejanne Markus	Netherlands	55:59.57	+1:43.37
8	William Barta; Lawson Craddock; Neilson Powless; Megan Jastrab; Coryn Labecki; Skylar Schneider	United States	56:02.05	+1:45.85
9	Patrick Gamper; Lukas Pöstlberger; Sebastian Schönberger; Carina Schrempf; Christina Schweinberger; Kathrin Schweinberger	Austria	56:14.03	+1:57.83
10	Maciej Bodnar; Piotr Brozyna; Mateusz Gajdulewicz; Marta Jaskulska; Marta Lach; Agnieszka Skalniak-Sójka	Poland	57:03.13	+2:46.93
11	Xabier Azparren; Raúl García Pierna; Ivan Romeo Abad; Sandra Alonso; Sara Martín; Alba Teruel	Spain	58:16.13	+3:59.93
12	Igor Chzhan; Yevgeniy Fedorov; Dmitriy Gruzdev; Faina Potapova; Rinata Sultanova; Makhabbat Umutzhanova	Kazakhstan	59:29.30	+5:13.10
13	Dmitriy Bocharov; Aleksey Fomovskiy; Muradjan Khalmuratov; Sofiya Karimova; Yanina Kuskova; Olga Zabelinskaya	Uzbekistan	59:42.10	+5:25.90
14	Amir Arslan Ansari; Kiya Rogora (ETH); Ahmad Badreddin Wais; Selam Amha (ETH); Maude Elaine le Roux (RSA); Elina Tasane (EST)	World Cycling Centre	1:00:48.47	+6:32.27
15	Maksym Bilyi; Vitaliy Novakovskyi; Dmytro Polupan; Yuliia Biriukova; Daryna Nahuliak; Olga Shekel	Ukraine	1:01:00.47	+6:44.27
16	Aurelien de Comarmond; Alexandre Mayer; Christopher Rougier-Lagane; Aurélie Halbwachs; Raphaëlle Lamusse; Kimberley Le Court de Billot	Mauritius	1:01:24.02	+7:07.82
17	Ju Jinyang; Li Tiancheng; Xue Ming; Cui Yuhang; Zeng Luyao; Sun Jiajun	China	1:01:28.50	+7:12.30
18	Qais Haidari; Mohamed Islam Jorat; Ahmad Mirzaee; Fariba Hashimi; Yulduz Hashimi; Zahra Rezayee	Afghanistan	1:12:04.95	+17:48.75
