= 2023 UCI Road World Championships – Women's under-23 time trial =

Cycling race

Women's under-23 time trial
2023 UCI Road World Championships

Race details
- Dates: 10 August 2023
- Stages: 1 in Stirling, Scotland
- Distance: 36.4 km (22.62 mi)
- Winning time: 49' 27.26"

Medalists
	Gold	(Germany) Antonia Niedermaier (GER)
	Silver	(France) Cédrine Kerbaol (FRA)
	Bronze	(Belgium) Julie De Wilde (BEL)

The women's under-23 time trial title and rankings of the 2023 UCI Road World Championships were derived from the results of those born in 2001 or later who took part in the women's time trial event of that championships, which took place on 10 August 2023 in Stirling, Scotland.

== Final classification ==
Rank	Rider	Country	Time
1	Antonia Niedermaier	Germany	49' 27.26"
2	Cédrine Kerbaol	France	+7.85"
3	Julie De Wilde	Belgium	+ 39.13"
4	Anniina Ahtosalo	Finland	+ 2' 08.36"
5	Petra Zsankó	Hungary	+ 2' 14.22"
6	Nora Jenčušová	Slovakia	+ 2' 32.91"
7	Eliška Kvasničková	Czech Republic	+ 2' 50.60"
8	Ella Wyllie	New Zealand	+ 3' 19.26"
9	Febe Jooris	Belgium	+ 3' 26.58"
10	Nina Berton	Luxembourg	+ 3' 39.70"
11	Kristýna Burlová	Czech Republic	+ 3' 47.92"
12	Tetiana Yashchenko	Ukraine	+ 3' 51.95"
13	Catalina Soto Campos	Chile	+ 4' 06.51"
14	Diane Ingabire	Rwanda	+ 5' 14.89"
15	Margarita Misyurina	Uzbekistan	+ 5' 57.71"
16	Yuhang Cui	China	+ 6' 12.44"
17	Fariba Hashimi	Afghanistan	+ 6' 50.77"
18	Nesrine Houili	Algeria	+ 7' 40.22"
19	Abigail Sarabia Ricaldez	Bolivia	+ 8' 56.06"
20	Fanny Cauchois One	Laos	+ 10' 45.34"
21	Grace Ayuba	Nigeria	+ 14' 19.34"
22	Mary Samuel	Nigeria	+ 14' 59.54"
23	Florence Nakagwa	Uganda	+ 16' 21.89"
