= 2023 Tour Féminin des Pyrénées =

Abandoned French cycling race

2023 Tour Féminin International des Pyrénées
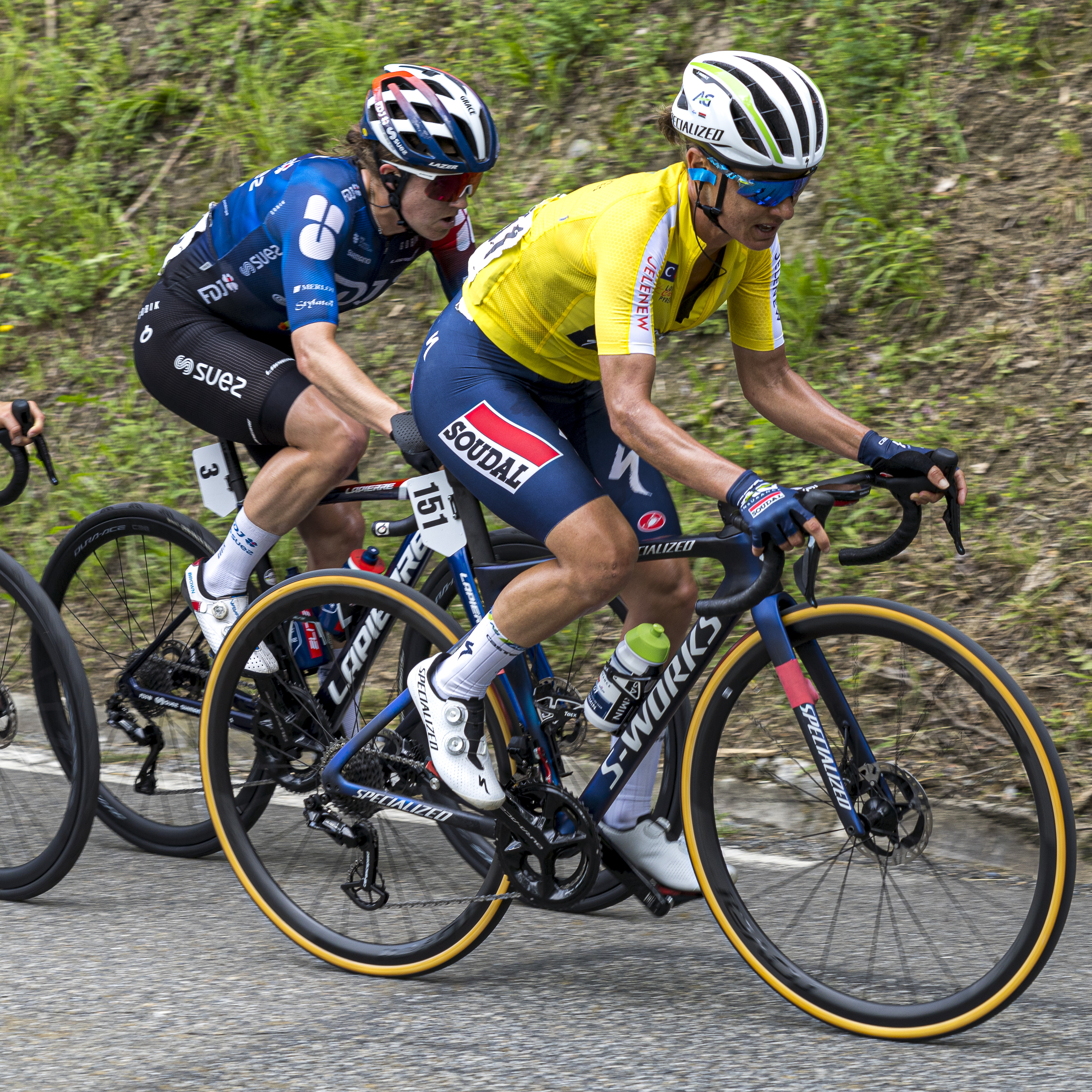
- Ashleigh Moolman Pasio and Grace Brown at the 2023 Tour Féminin des Pyrénées

Race details
- Dates: 9–10 June (Note: The third stage, which was scheduled for 11 June was abandoned.)
- Stages: 2

Results
	Winner	Marta Cavalli (ITA)	(FDJ–Suez)
	Second	Ashleigh Moolman Pasio (RSA)	(AG Insurance–Soudal–Quick-Step)
	Third	Antonia Niedermaier (GER)	(Canyon//SRAM)

The 2023 Tour Féminin des Pyrénées (officially CIC-Tour Féminin International des Pyrénées) was the second edition of the Tour Féminin International des Pyrénées, a women's road cycling stage race in France. Scheduled to be held between 9 and 11 June, the third stage was abandoned for safety reasons. Marta Cavalli won the general classification at the race; Ashleigh Moolman Pasio and Antonia Niedermaier finished second and third respectively.

== Background ==
The 2023 Tour Féminin Pyrénées was scheduled to feature three stages in the Pyrénées-Atlantiques and Hautes-Pyrénées departments of France. The race started in Argelès-Gazost, and was scheduled to end in Bosdarros. The race was on an open course, meaning that non-race vehicles could use the roads during the event. Pre-race favourites included Ashleigh Moolman Pasio, Gaia Masetti, Cecilie Uttrup Ludwig, Clara Koppenburg and Claire Steels.

== Route and stages ==
Stage summaries
Stage	Date	Course	Distance	Type	Winner	Ref
1	9 June	Argelès-Gazost to Lourdes	129 km (80 mi)	Hilly stage	Ashleigh Moolman Pasio (RSA)	
2	10 June	Pierrefitte-Nestalas to Hautacam	70.8 km (44.0 mi) (Note: Stage 2 was originally scheduled for 96 kilometres (60 mi). The first 25 kilometres (16 mi) of the stage was neutralised.)	Mountain stage	Marta Cavalli (ITA)	
3	11 June	Nay to Bosdarros	126 km (78 mi)	Hilly stage	Stage cancelled.	

== Race summary ==
The first stage started in Argelès-Gazost and ended in Lourdes. There were multiple incidents on the stage, including oncoming vehicles and cars blocking the cyclists' route. Multiple riders had falls and had to be taken to hospital. Cecilie Uttrup-Ludwig almost crashed into a moving car in the last 3 kilometres (1.9 mi) of the event.

The second stage was scheduled for 96 kilometres (60 mi) of racing. Following discussion between teams, the Union Cycliste Internationale and the Cyclistes professionnels associés (CPA), the first 25 kilometres (16 mi) of the stage was neutralised. The competitors were given a choice about racing, and after 28 kilometres (17 mi) of cycling, they came to a stop for safety reasons, primarily after complaints of course motorbikes being too close to the riders. The riders contested the 13.3-kilometre (8.3 mi) climb to Hautacam. With 3.5 kilometres (2.2 mi) of the stage to go, FDJ–Suez took control of the front of the peloton, and the race finished in a sprint between Marta Cavalli, Ashleigh Moolman Pasio and Antonia Niedermaier. Cavalli won the stage and also took the leader's jersey by three seconds from Moolman Pasio. Niedermaier was in third on the stage at a deficit of eight seconds.

=== Abandonment ===
After the second stage, multiple teams including Team Jumbo–Visma and Human Powered Health announced that they planned to withdraw from the race due to safety concerns including pedestrians on the roads, and reckless drivers.

On Sunday morning, 17 of the 23 teams voted to abandon the final stage. As a result, the third stage of the race was officially abandoned; Marta Cavalli was declared the race winner. Following the race abandonment, race director Pascal Baudron criticised the riders, saying that their safety expectations were "not in line with their level" and claiming that they were children for not racing the third stage. CPA president Adam Hansen announced that the race's safety issues would be discussed in a future meeting.

=== General classification ===
Final general classification (1–10)
Rank	Rider	Team	Time
1	Marta Cavalli (ITA)	FDJ–Suez	5h 30' 51"
2	Ashleigh Moolman Pasio (RSA)	AG Insurance–Soudal–Quick-Step	+ 0' 03"
3	Antonia Niedermaier (GER)	Canyon//SRAM	+ 0' 05"
4	Cecilie Uttrup Ludwig (DEN)	FDJ–Suez	+ 0' 38"
5	Neve Bradbury (AUS)	Canyon//SRAM	+ 1' 14"
6	Grace Brown (AUS)	FDJ–Suez	+ 1' 38"
7	Clara Koppenburg (GER)	Cofidis	+ 1' 46"
8	Pauliena Rooijakkers (NED)	Canyon//SRAM	+ 2' 16"
9	Cédrine Kerbaol (FRA)	Ceratizit–WNT Pro Cycling	+ 2' 27"
10	Lotte Claes (BEL)	Stade Rochelais Charente-Maritime	+ 2' 32"
