= Jannik Steimle =

German cyclist (born 1996)

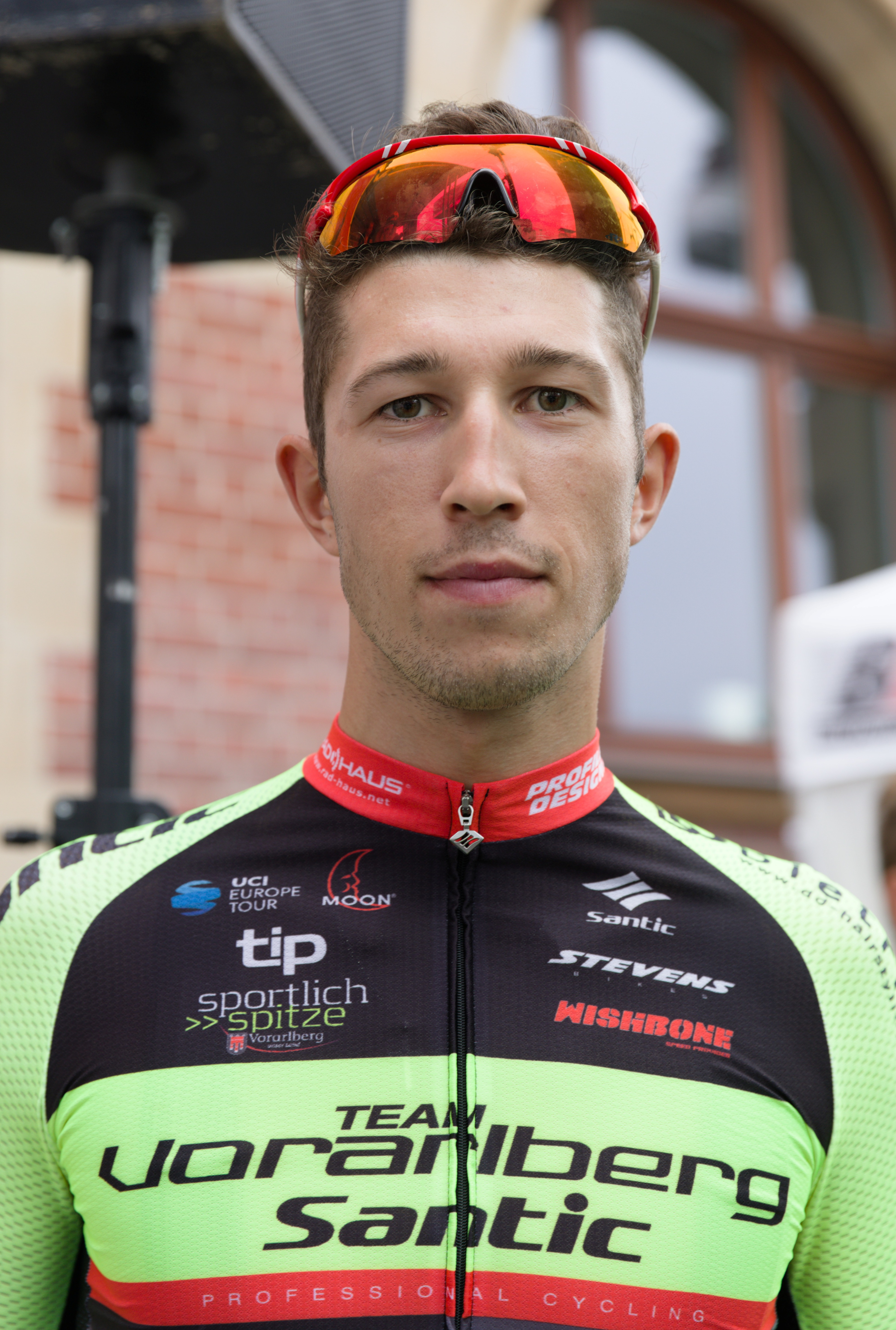
- Steimle in 2018

Personal information
- Full name: Jannik Steimle
- Born: 4 April 1996 (age 30) Weilheim an der Teck, Germany
- Height: 1.87 m (6 ft 2 in)
- Weight: 73 kg (161 lb)

Cycling career
- Sport: Cycling
- Discipline: Road
- Role: Rider

Professional teams
- 2016–2017: Team Felbermayr–Simplon Wels
- 2018–2019: Team Vorarlberg Santic
- 2019: Deceuninck–Quick-Step (stagiaire)
- 2020–2023: Deceuninck–Quick-Step
- 2024–2025: Q36.5 Pro Cycling Team

Major wins
- One-day races and Classics GP de Denain (2024)
Medal record
Men's road bicycle racing
Representing Germany
World Championships
Bronze medal – third place	2023 Glasgow	Mixed team relay
European Championships
Silver medal – second place	2024 Limburg	Mixed team relay
Bronze medal – third place	2023 Drenthe	Mixed team relay

Jannik Steimle (born 4 April 1996) is a German former professional road cyclist, who last rode for UCI ProTeam Q36.5 Pro Cycling Team.

In August 2019, Steimle joined UCI WorldTeam Deceuninck–Quick-Step as a stagiaire for the second half of the season. In mid-September Steimle signed a two-year contract with the team, and a few days later won his first race, the Kampioenschap van Vlaanderen, after a solo effort with 10 kilometres (6.2 miles) to go. In October 2020, he was named in the startlist for the 2020 Vuelta a España.

He announced his retirement in November 2025, saying that the birth of his son had made him "think differently" about the risks of competing in the sport.

== Major results ==
2016
1st Croatia–Slovenia
2018
Kreiz Breizh Elites

1st Mountains classification
1st Stage 2

3rd Overall Paris–Arras Tour

1st Young rider classification

4th Overall Okolo Jižních Čech

1st Mountains classification
1st Stage 5

5th GP Izola
6th Overall Flèche du Sud

1st Mountains classification

8th Rund um Köln
2019 (3 pro wins)
1st Overall Oberösterreichrundfahrt

1st Stage 1

1st Kampioenschap van Vlaanderen
Tour of Austria

1st Prologue & Stage 5

1st Stage 4 Flèche du Sud
3rd Overall CCC Tour

1st Stage 1a (ITT)

5th International Rhodes Grand Prix
2020 (2)
1st Overall Okolo Slovenska

1st Stage 1b (ITT)

2021 (1)
2nd Overall Okolo Slovenska

1st Stage 2

2022
2nd Time trial, National Road Championships
10th Nokere Koerse
2023
3rd Team relay, UCI Road World Championships
3rd Team relay, UEC European Road Championships
4th Road race, National Road Championships
2024 (1)
1st Grand Prix de Denain
4th Time trial, National Road Championships

=== Grand Tour general classification results timeline ===
Grand Tour	2020
Giro d'Italia	—
Tour de France	—
Vuelta a España	83

Legend
—	Did not compete
DNF	Did not finish
