= 2023 UCI Road World Championships =

Cycling world championships

- Location within Scotland
- Venue: Glasgow and across Scotland
- Date: 5–13 August 2023
- Coordinates: 55°51′38.5″N 4°14′58.7″W
- Events: 13

The 2023 UCI Road World Championships were the 96th edition of the UCI Road World Championships, the annual world championships for road bicycle racing. They were held between 5 and 13 August 2023 in Scotland, as part of the inaugural UCI Cycling World Championships.

A total of thirteen events were held, consisting of six road races (all finishing in Glasgow city centre), six individual time trials (starting and finishing in Stirling) and a team time trial mixed relay (also held in Glasgow).

== Routes ==
In March 2023, the routes for the championships were announced by the Union Cycliste Internationale (UCI).

=== Road races ===
For all the road races, a 14.3-kilometre (8.9-mile) finishing circuit was used, the majority of which had previously been used in the road races at the 2013 British National Road Championships, the 2014 Commonwealth Games, and the 2018 European Road Cycling Championships. However, the circuit began at George Square rather than starting in Glasgow Green. The circuit then headed towards Kelvingrove Park via – amongst others – Queen Street, Argyle Street, Buchanan Street, St. Vincent Street, North Street and Sauchiehall Street. After exiting the park, the riders passed the University of Glasgow before descending into the West End at Byres Road. Passing through Kelvingrove Park for a second time, the riders went through the Park District as they headed back towards the city centre. Having traversed the city, the riders passed through the Rottenrow, High Street, Ingram Street and George Street before reaching Montrose Street, a 0.2-kilometre (0.12-mile) climb at an average gradient of nearly 8%. From there, the riders descended back into George Square, passing Glasgow Queen Street railway station and Nelson Mandela Square, before a pair of 90-degree left-handed corners onto the finishing straight. Both junior road races were held over the circuit, with the women completing five laps and the men completing nine laps. (Note: A 1.5-kilometre (0.93-mile) neutralised section was held on the first lap of the junior races.)

The men's road race on the first weekend started at Holyrood Park in Edinburgh on a 271.1-kilometre (168.5-mile) route, heading towards Fife via the Queensferry Crossing. The riders then headed alongside the Firth of Forth before crossing the estuary again at the Clackmannanshire Bridge into the Falkirk council area. After passing through Falkirk, Bonnybridge, Denny and Fintry, the riders climbed the Crow Road, a 5.7-kilometre (3.5-mile) climb with an average gradient of 4.2%. Following this, the riders descended into Glasgow via Lennoxtown, Torrance and Bearsden, entering the finishing circuit at Byres Road – 6 kilometres (3.7 miles) around the lap – after 119.8 kilometres (74.4 miles). Ten full laps of the circuit were completed before the race's conclusion, following 3,570 metres (11,710 feet) of total elevation.

The men's under-23 and women's road races on the second weekend both started on the banks of Loch Lomond, at Balloch. The race followed the A811 road in the Loch Lomond and The Trossachs National Park to Gartocharn and Drymen, before passing through Balfron and Fintry, before joining the same route as the men's race ahead of the Crow Road. Both races entered the finishing circuit after 60 kilometres (37 miles) of racing; the women completed six full laps of the circuit for a total distance of 154.1 kilometres (95.8 miles) and 2,229 metres (7,313 feet) of total elevation, with the under-23 men completing one additional lap, for a total distance of 168.4 kilometres (104.6 miles) and 2,436 metres (7,992 feet) of total elevation.

=== Time trials ===
The team time trial mixed relay was held over two laps of a 20.15-kilometre (12.52-mile) circuit, which started on Argyle Street and followed the circuit used in the road races through to Byres Road. Thereafter, the route extended onto the A82 road between Hillhead and Kelvinside, before doubling back on itself, with the riders then rejoining the original circuit until High Street. An additional loop in and around Glasgow Green took the riders alongside the River Clyde, rejoining the original circuit via the Saltmarket.

All the individual time trial races were held over three days in and around Stirling, with all the races finishing at Stirling Castle. On the first day, the men's under-23 race was held over a 36.4-kilometre (22.6-mile) route, following the A811 road out of Stirling towards Gargunnock. After a right-hand turn, the route headed towards Blair Drummond Safari Park from the south, before turning away to the left. After following several B-roads, the route returned to the A811 road in the other direction, and deviated first into Gargunnock and then for a second time towards Cambusbarron via Touch Road, passing near to Touch House. The route headed back towards Stirling thereafter, and was also used for the women's time trial the following day. Also on the second day, the junior women's event was held over a distance of 13.6 kilometres (8.5 miles), following the A811 road to the junction with Touch Road, before turning back on itself, following the route to Cambusbarron and the finish in Stirling city centre.

On the third day, the junior men competed over a 23-kilometre (14-mile) route, utilising the A811 road for around 10 kilometres (6.2 miles) to Gargunnock, before turning towards the village and following the final 13 kilometres (8.1 miles) of the men's under-23 route. The last of the races, the men's event, was held over the longest distance at 48.1 kilometres (29.9 miles) in length. It followed the same route as the men's under-23 event for the first quarter, before heading towards the village of Thornhill. Turning left back to the south, the route passed the Flanders Moss national nature reserve, before rejoining the A811 road in the same direction as before. The race turned back before reaching the hamlet of Arnprior, passing through Kippen and then ultimately rejoining the route from Gargunnock to Stirling via Cambusbarron as before.

== Schedule ==
All times listed below are for the local time – British Summer Time or UTC+01:00.

=== Road races ===
Date	Timings		Event	Location (start)	Location (finish)	Distance	Laps (Note: This denotes the number of full laps completed of the 14.3-kilometre (8.9-mile) Glasgow city centre circuit.)
5 August	10:00	12:00	Junior women	Glasgow	Glasgow	70 km (43 mi)	5
5 August	13:00	16:00	Junior men	Glasgow	Glasgow	127.2 km (79.0 mi)	9
6 August	09:30	16:00	Elite men	Edinburgh	Glasgow	271.1 km (168.5 mi)	10
12 August	12:00	16:00	Under-23 men	Balloch	Glasgow	168.4 km (104.6 mi)	7
13 August	12:00	16:00	Elite women	Balloch	Glasgow	154.1 km (95.8 mi)	6
13 August	12:00	16:00	Under-23 women (Note: These events are held within the elite women's events.)	Balloch	Glasgow	154.1 km (95.8 mi)	6

=== Mixed event ===
Date	Timings		Event	Location (start)	Location (finish)	Distance	Laps (Note: This denotes the number of laps of the 20.15-kilometre (12.52-mile) circuit; the first lap is completed by three male riders, with the second lap completed by three female riders.)
8 August	13:00	16:00	Mixed team relay	Glasgow		40.3 km (25.0 mi)	2

=== Individual time trials ===
Date	Timings		Event	Location (start)	Location (finish)	Distance
9 August	14:30	17:00	Under-23 men	Stirling		36.4 km (22.6 mi)
10 August	11:15	13:00	Junior women	Stirling		13.6 km (8.5 mi)
10 August	14:00	16:30	Elite women	Stirling		36.4 km (22.6 mi)
10 August	14:00	16:30	Under-23 women	Stirling		36.4 km (22.6 mi)
11 August	10:00	12:30	Junior men	Stirling		23 km (14 mi)
11 August	14:35	17:00	Elite men	Stirling		48.1 km (29.9 mi)

== Medal summary ==
=== Elite events ===
Event	Gold		Silver		Bronze	
Men's Events
Men's road race	Mathieu van der Poel; Netherlands	6h 07' 27"	Wout van Aert; Belgium	+ 1' 37"	Tadej Pogačar; Slovenia	+ 1' 45"
Men's time trial	Remco Evenepoel; Belgium	55' 19.23"	Filippo Ganna; Italy	+ 12.28"	Josh Tarling; Great Britain	+ 48.20"
Women's Events
Women's road race	Lotte Kopecky; Belgium	4h 02' 12"	Demi Vollering; Netherlands	+ 7"	Cecilie Uttrup Ludwig; Denmark	+ 7"
Women's time trial	Chloé Dygert; United States	46' 59.80"	Grace Brown; Australia	+ 5.67"	Christina Schweinberger; Austria	+ 1' 12.95"
Mixed Event
Mixed relay	Switzerland; Stefan Bissegger; Elise Chabbey; Nicole Koller; Stefan Küng; Marlen Reusser; Mauro Schmid	54' 16.20"	France; Bruno Armirail; Rémi Cavagna; Bryan Coquard; Audrey Cordon-Ragot; Cédrine Kerbaol; Juliette Labous	+ 7.08"	Germany; Miguel Heidemann; Jannik Steimle; Maximilian Walscheid; Ricarda Bauernfeind; Lisa Klein; Franziska Koch	+ 51.31"

=== Under-23 events ===
Event	Gold		Silver		Bronze	
Men's Under-23 Events
Men's under-23 road race	Axel Laurance; France	4h 04' 58"	António Morgado; Portugal	+ 2"	Martin Svrček; Slovakia	+ 2"
Men's under-23 time trial	Lorenzo Milesi; Italy	43' 00"	Alec Segaert; Belgium	+ 11"	Hamish McKenzie; Australia	+ 51"
Women's Under-23 Events
Women's under-23 road race	Blanka Vas; Hungary	4h 06' 46"	Shirin van Anrooij; Netherlands	+ 0"	Anna Shackley; Great Britain	+ 0"
Women's under-23 time trial	Antonia Niedermaier; Germany	49' 27.26"	Cédrine Kerbaol; France	+ 7.85"	Julie De Wilde; Belgium	+ 39.13"

=== Junior events ===
Event	Gold		Silver		Bronze	
Men's Juniors Events
Men's junior road race	Albert Philipsen; Denmark	3h 06' 26"	Paul Fietzke; Germany	+ 1' 19"	Felix Ørn-Kristoff; Norway	+ 1' 19"
Men's junior time trial	Oscar Chamberlain; Australia	29' 29.62"	Ben Wiggins; Great Britain	+ 24.87"	Louis Leidert; Germany	+ 34.11"
Women's Juniors Events
Women's junior road race	Julie Bego; France	1h 54' 53"	Cat Ferguson; Great Britain	+ 9"	Fleur Moors; Belgium	+ 9"
Women's junior time trial	Felicity Wilson-Haffenden; Australia	19' 31.51"	Isabel Sharp; Great Britain	+ 16.59"	Federica Venturelli; Italy	+ 29.30"

== Medal table ==
* Host nation (Great Britain)

Rank	Nation	Gold	Silver	Bronze	Total
1	Belgium	2	2	2	6
2	France	2	2	0	4
3	Australia	2	1	1	4
4	Netherlands	1	2	0	3
5	Germany	1	1	2	4
6	Italy	1	1	1	3
7	Denmark	1	0	1	2
8	Hungary	1	0	0	1
8	Switzerland	1	0	0	1
8	United States	1	0	0	1
11	Great Britain*	0	3	2	5
12	Portugal	0	1	0	1
13	Austria	0	0	1	1
13	Norway	0	0	1	1
13	Slovakia	0	0	1	1
13	Slovenia	0	0	1	1
Totals (16 entries)		13	13	13	39

== Broadcasters ==
Africa

- Sub-Saharian Africa: SuperSport

Americas

- Canada: FloSports

Asia

- Brunei: Astro
- China: China Central Television
- Japan: NHK, Nippon TV and J Sports
- Malaysia: Astro
- Philippines: TAP
- Singapore: StarHub
- Thailand: JKN and TrueVisions

Europe

- Belgium: RTBF and VRT
- Czech Republic: ČT Sport
- Denmark: TV2 Sport
- France: France TV
- Germany: ZDF
- United Kingdom: BBC
- Italy: RAI
- Netherlands: NOS
- Norway: TV2
- Poland: TVP
- Slovenia: RTV Slovenia
- Sweden: SVT
- Switzerland: SRG SSR
- Spain: Televisión Española
- Pan-Europe: Eurosport
