= Anna Shackley =

British cyclist

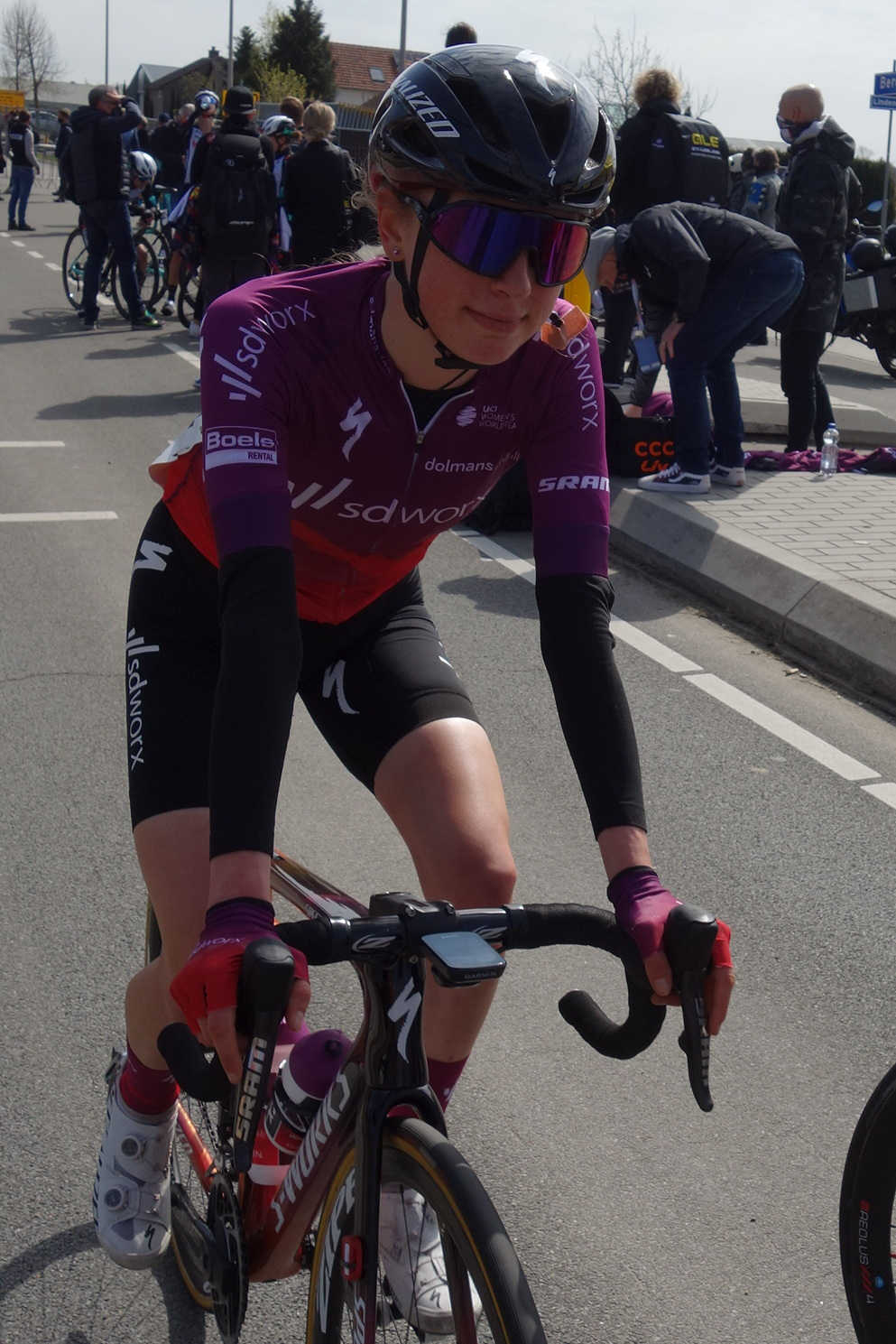
- Shackley at the 2021 Amstel Gold Race

Personal information
- Full name: Anna Shackley
- Born: 17 May 2001 (age 25) Milngavie, Scotland

Cycling career
- Sport: Cycling
- Current team: Cynisca Cycling
- Disciplines: Road; Track
- Role: Rider (retired); Directeur sportif
- Rider type: Endurance (track); Climber (road)

Amateur teams
- 2011–2017: Glasgow Riderz
- 2018–2019: Team 22
- 2020: Team Breeze

Professional team
- 2021–2024: SD Worx

Managerial teams
- 2024: Alba Development Road Team
- 2025–: Cynisca Cycling
Medal record
Women's road bicycle racing
Representing Great Britain
World Championships
Bronze medal – third place	2023 Glasgow	Under-23 road race
European Championships
Silver medal – second place	2023 Drenthe	Under-23 road race

Anna Shackley (born 17 May 2001) is a British former road and track cyclist from Scotland, who competed professionally between 2021 and 2024 for UCI Women's WorldTeam Team SD Worx–Protime. She won medals at the under-23 road race of both the European Championships and the World Championships in 2023, before she was forced to retire due to cardiac arrhythmia.

Since her retirement, Shackley has worked as a directeur sportif for UCI Women's Continental Teams Alba Development Road Team and Cynisca Cycling.

== Career ==
At the 2020 British National Track Championships, Shackley won the national titles in the points race and the team pursuit events. She was signed by UCI Women's WorldTeam SD Worx for the 2021 season.

Shackley was chosen to be part of Great Britain's cycling squad at the postponed 2020 Tokyo Olympics where she would contest the time trial and the road race. She competed at the 2022 Commonwealth Games where she finished 10th in the women's road time trial event and 21st in the women's road race.

In 2023 Shackley competed in the inaugural Tour de l'Avenir Femmes, where she placed 2nd in the final general classification. She also won medals at the under-23 road race of both the European Championships (silver) and the World Championships (bronze) during the season.

Shackley announced her retirement in April 2024 because of her heart condition, cardiac arrhythmia.

== Major results ==
=== Road ===
2019
3rd Overall Watersley Ladies Challenge
2021
National Championships

1st Under-23 time trial
5th Road race

1st Overall Rás na mBan

1st Mountains classification
1st Stage 4

2022
5th Road race, UCI World Under-23 Championships
5th Time trial, National Championships
7th Ceratizit Challenge by La Vuelta
10th Time trial, Commonwealth Games
10th Overall Tour de Romandie
2023
2nd Road race, UEC European Under-23 Championships
2nd Overall Tour de l'Avenir
3rd Road race, UCI World Under-23 Championships
4th Overall UAE Tour
5th Road race, National Championships
7th Overall Tour de Romandie

=== Track ===
2020
National Championships

1st Team pursuit
1st Points race
