= Cédrine Kerbaol =

French cyclist (born 2001)

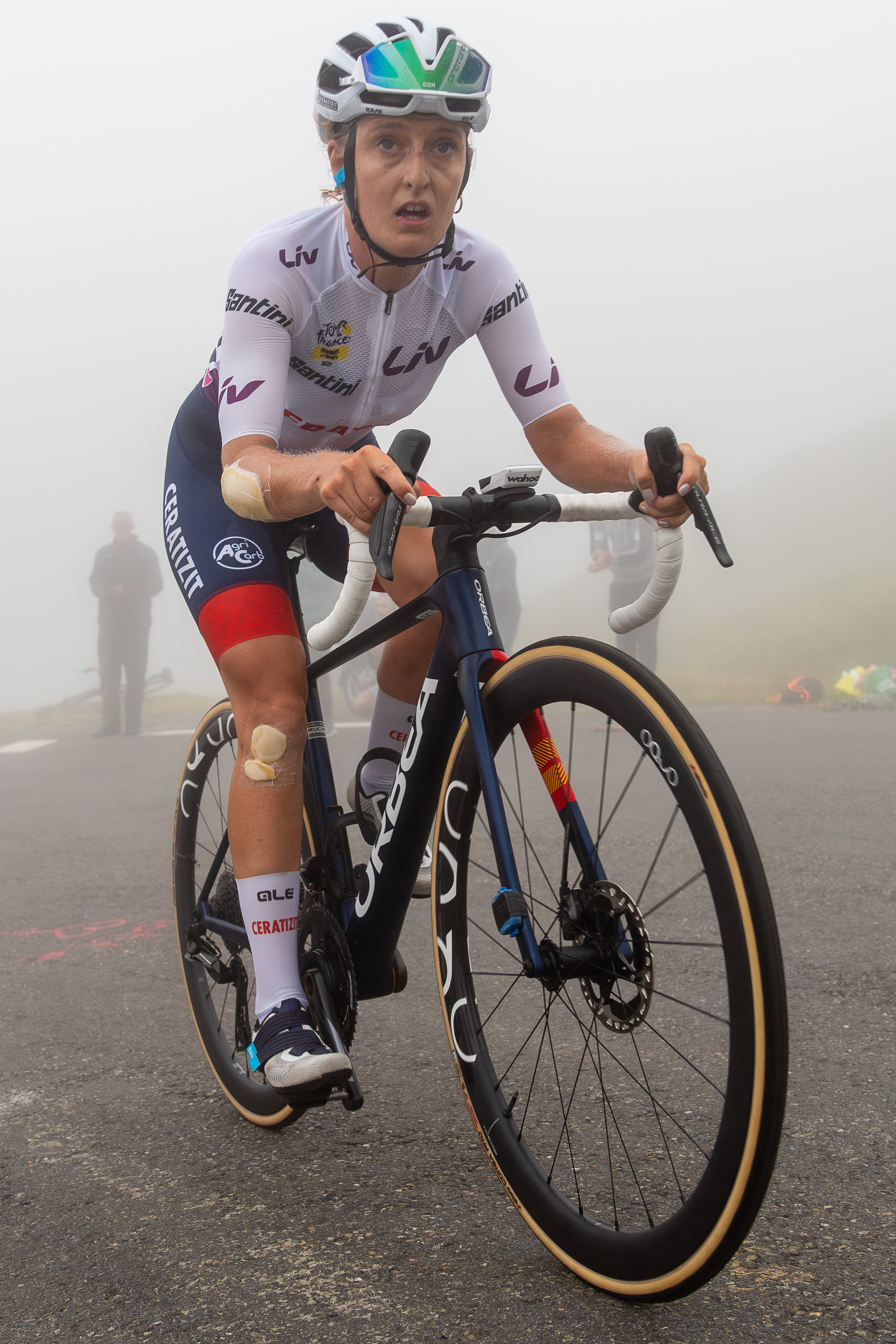
- Kerbaol at the 2023 Tour de France Femmes

Personal information
- Born: 15 May 2001 (age 25) Brest, France
- Height: 1.66 m (5 ft 5 in)
- Weight: 57 kg (126 lb)

Cycling career
- Sport: Cycling
- Current team: EF Education–Oatly
- Discipline: Road
- Role: Rider

Amateur team
- 2018–2020: Breizh Ladies

Professional teams
- 2021: Arkéa Pro Cycling Team
- 2022: Cofidis
- 2023-2024: Ceratizit–WNT Pro Cycling
- 2025-: EF Education–Oatly

Major wins
- Major Tours Tour de France Young rider classification (2023) 1 individual stage (2024) La Vuelta Femenina 1 individual stage (2026) One-day races and Classics National Time Trial Championships (2023, 2025) Tre Valli Varesine (2024)
Medal record
Women's road bicycle racing
Representing France
World Championships
Silver medal – second place	2023 Glasgow	Mixed team relay
Silver medal – second place	2023 Glasgow	Under-23 time trial
Silver medal – second place	2025 Kigali	Mixed team relay
European Championships
Gold medal – first place	2023 Drenthe	Mixed team relay
Gold medal – first place	2025 Guilherand-Granges	Mixed team relay
Mediterranean Games
Bronze medal – third place	2022 Oran	Time trial

Cédrine Kerbaol (born 15 May 2001) is a French road racing cyclist, who rides for UCI Women's ProTeam EF Education–Oatly. She rode for UCI Women's World Team Ceratizit Pro Cycling until late 2024 following administrative delays that allowed her contract to be broken.

== Career ==
In 2023, she won the inaugural Tour de Normandie women's race, as well as winning the time trial at the French National Championships.

== Major results ==
2018
7th Chrono des Nations WJ
2019
National Junior Road Championships

1st Road race
3rd Time trial

2020
7th La Périgord Ladies
2021
1st Time trial, National Under-23 Road Championships
3rd Time trial, National Road Championships
4th Grote Prijs Beerens
2022
2nd Overall Bretagne Ladies Tour
3rd Time trial, Mediterranean Games
3rd Time trial, National Road Championships
2023
1st Team relay, UEC European Road Championships
1st Time trial, National Road Championships
1st Tour de Normandie Féminin

1st Young rider classification
1st Stage 2

1st Young rider classification, Tour de France
2nd Time trial, UCI Road World Under-23 Championships
2nd Grand Prix du Morbihan
6th RideLondon Classique
7th Bretagne Ladies Tour
9th Tour Féminin des Pyrénées
10th Grand Prix Elsy Jacobs
2024
1st Tre Valli Varesine
1st Vuelta Comunitat Valenciana
1st Durango-Durango Emakumeen Saria
5th Grand Prix Féminin de Chambéry
6th Overall Tour de France

1st Stage 6
Combativity award Stage 6

6th Overall Volta a Catalunya
9th Overall Tour de Romandie
9th Clasica Femenina Navarra
9th Classic Lorient Agglomération
10th Kreiz Breizh Elites
2025
3rd Trofeo Binissalem-Andratx
4th Liège–Bastogne–Liège
8th Overall Tour de France
2026
1st Stage 3 La Vuelta Femenina
2nd UCI Road World Championships – Mixed team relay
2nd Overall Tour de Suisse

1st Young rider classification

5th UCI Road World Championships – Women's time trial
8th Overall Vuelta a Burgos

=== General classification results timeline ===
Major Tour results timeline
Stage race	2019	2020	2021	2022	2023	2024	2025	2026
La Vuelta Femenina (Note: Known as the Challenge by La Vuelta from 2020 to 2022)	—	—	—	—	—	—	4	18
Giro d'Italia Femminile	—	—	—	—	—	DNF	—	
Tour de France Femmes	Race did not exist			—	12	6	8	
Stage race results timeline
Stage race	2019	2020	2021	2022	2023	2024	2025	2026
Grand Prix Elsy Jacobs	—	NH	—	—	10	Not held		
Tour de Normandie Féminin	Race did not exist				1	12	NH	
Bretagne Ladies Tour	40	Not held		2	7	—	NH	
RideLondon Classique	—	Not held		—	6	25	NH	
Tour de Romandie Féminin	Race did not exist			—	—	9	—	
One day race results timeline
Stage race			2021	2022	2023	2024	2025	2026
Omloop Het Nieuwsblad			—	—	—	—	—	32
Liège–Bastogne–Liège Femmes			61	54	16	16	4	24
Paris–Roubaix Femmes			DNF	60	—	—	—	—
La Flèche Wallonne Femmes			—	69	—	—	28	—
Strade Bianche Donne			—	—	46	42	33	17

=== Major championship results timeline ===
Event		2020	2021	2022	2023	2024	2025
Olympic Games	Time trial	NH	—	Not held		—	NH
Olympic Games	Road race	NH	—	Not held		—	NH
World Championships	Time trial	—	—	—	13	14	13
World Championships	Road race	—	—	—	DNF	46	31
World Championships	Team relay	NH	—	—	2	4	2
European Championships	Time trial	—	—	—	—	—	9
European Championships	Road race	—	—	—	—	—	9
European Championships	Team relay	—	—	NH	1	—	1
National Championships	Time trial	11	3	3	1	2	1
National Championships	Road race	26	DNF	48	10	7	18

Legend
—	Did not compete
DNF	Did not finish
NH	Not held
