= Carina Schrempf =

Austrian cyclist (born 1994)

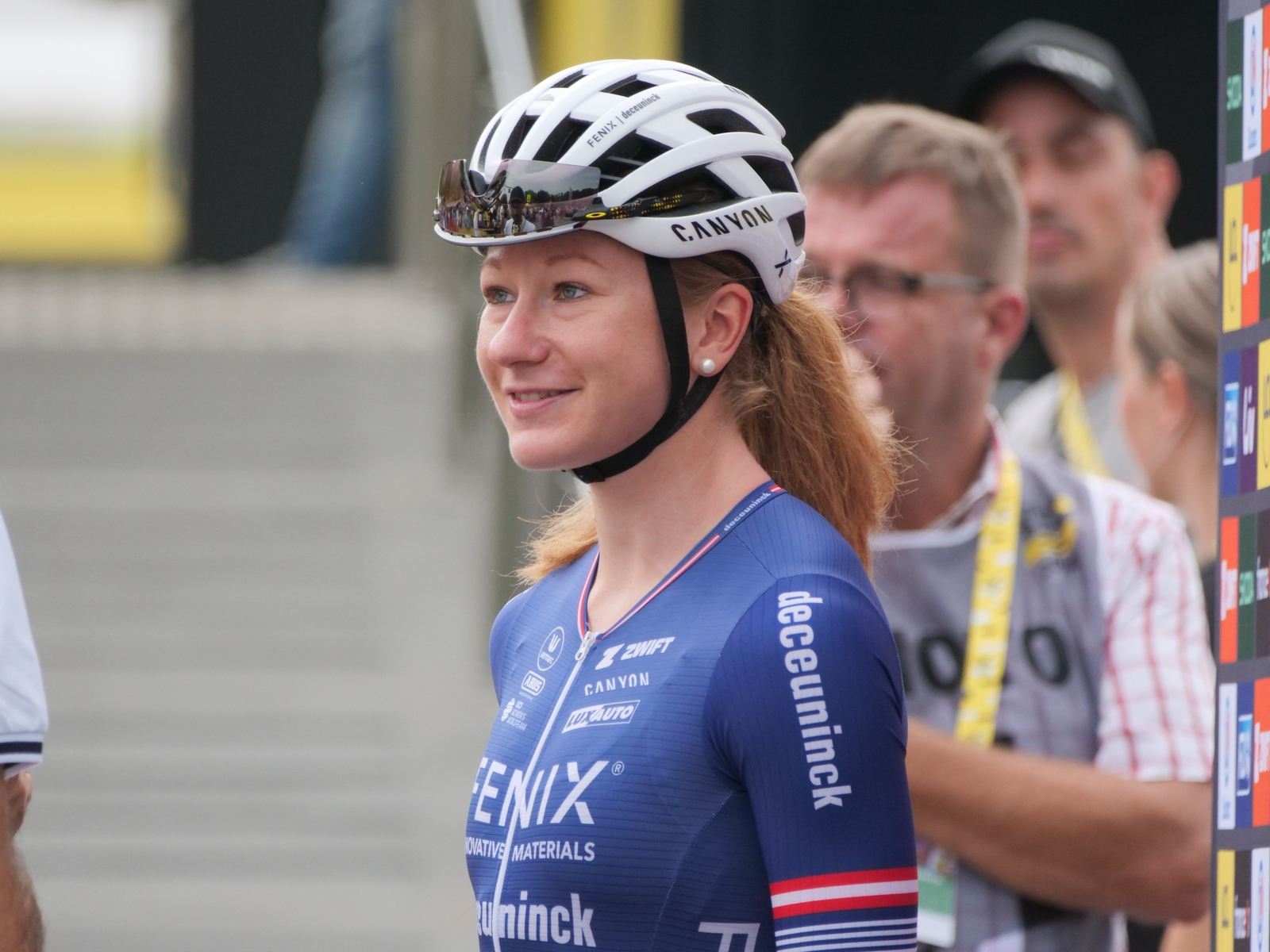
- Schrempf in 2024

Personal information
- Born: 16 October 1994 (age 32) Sankt Martin am Grimming, Austria
- Height: 1.70 m (5 ft 7 in)

Cycling career
- Sport: Cycling
- Current team: Fenix–Premier Tech
- Discipline: Road
- Role: Rider

Professional team
- 2023–: Fenix–Deceuninck

Major wins
- One-day races and Classics National Road Race Championships (2023)
Medal record
Women's athletics
Representing Austria
European Games
Gold medal – first place	2015 Baku	Mixed team

Carina Schrempf (born 16 October 1994) is an Austrian professional racing cyclist and former middle-distance runner, who currently rides for UCI Women's WorldTeam Fenix–Premier Tech.

== Running career ==
As a runner, she specialized in the 400 and 800 meters, and competed at the 2015 European Games. In 2016, Schrempf became the Austrian national champion in the 400 meters and in 2017, 2019 and 2020 in the 800 meters. She was also the indoor champion in the 800 meters in 2016, 2017 and 2021, the 400 meters in 2017 and in the 1500 meters in 2022, in addition to the 4 x 200-meter relay in 2017.

=== Personal bests ===
- 400 metres – 54.01 (Lexington, KY 2015)
  - Indoor – 55.36 (Vienna 2017)
- 800 metres – 2:04.76 (Jacksonville 2015)
  - Indoor – 2:07.88 (Vienna 2017)
- 1500 metres – 4:28.88i (Linz 2022)

== Cycling career ==
After an Achilles tendon injury in 2022, she began cycling, turning professional the following year with Fenix–Deceuninck. That year, she won the Austrian National Road Race Championships and competed in the mixed team relay at the UCI Road World Championships.

=== Major results ===
2022
5th Road race, National Road Championships
Visegrad 4 Ladies Series

6th Slovakia
7th Hungary

8th Overall Gracia–Orlová

1st Mountains classification

2023
1st Road race, National Road Championships
10th Ladies Tour of Estonia
