= Julie De Wilde =

Belgian cyclist

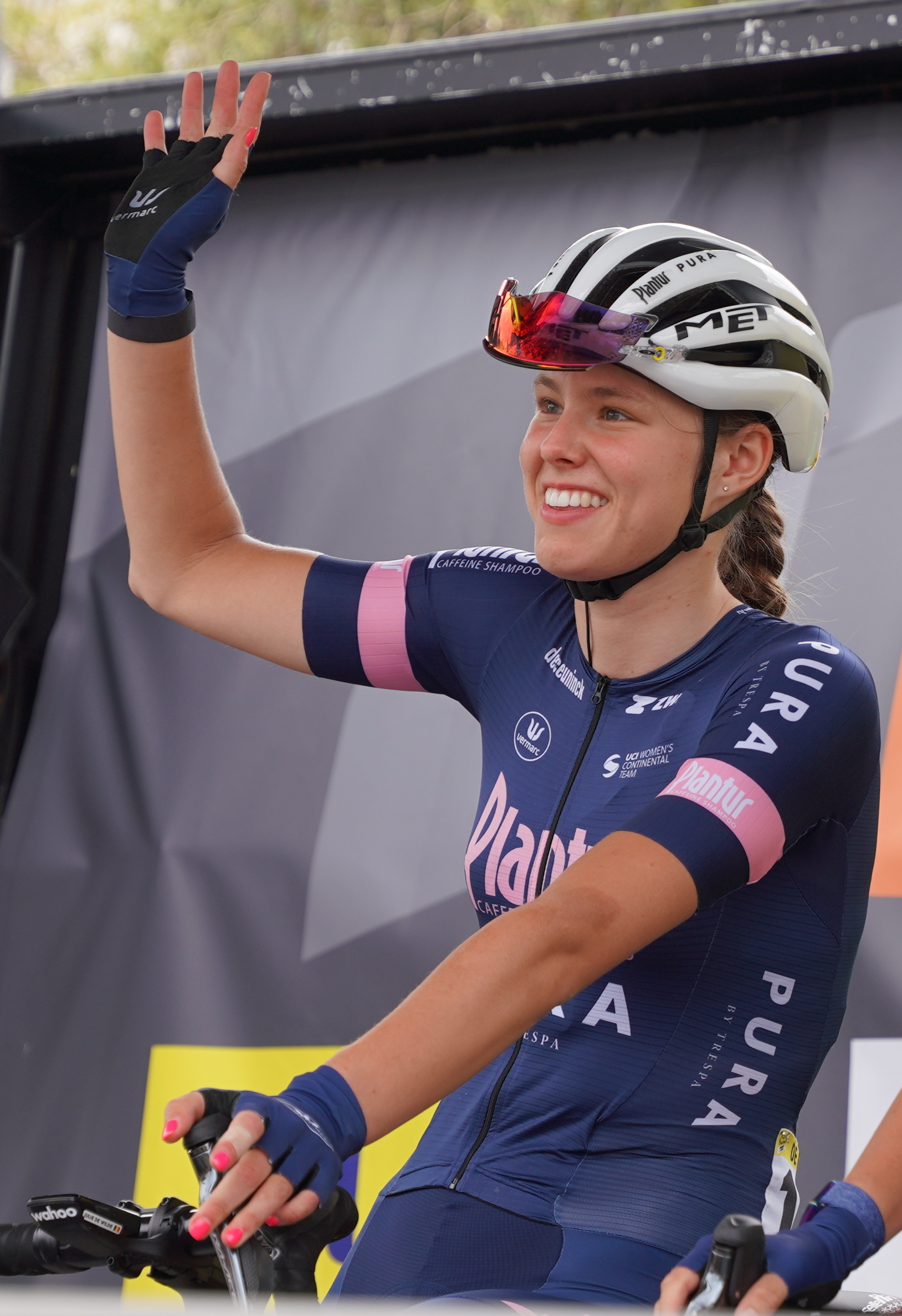
- 2022 Tour de France Femmes

Personal information
- Full name: Julie De Wilde
- Born: December 8, 2002 (age 23) Ghent, Belgium
- Height: 1.8 m (5 ft 11 in)
- Weight: 62 kg (137 lb)

Cycling career
- Sport: Cycling
- Current team: Fenix–Premier Tech (road); IKO–Crelan (cyclo-cross)
- Disciplines: Road; Cyclo-cross
- Role: Rider
- Rider type: Sprinter

Professional teams
- 2019–2020: Doltcini–NM Transport
- 2021–: Fenix–Deceuninck
Medal record
Representing Belgium
Women's road bicycle racing
World Championships
Bronze medal – third place	2023 Glasgow	Under-23 time trial
Bronze medal – third place	2024 Zurich	Under-23 time trial

Julie De Wilde (born 8 December 2002) is a Belgian professional racing cyclist, who currently rides for UCI Women's World Team Fenix–Premier Tech in road cycling, and in cyclo-cross for UCI Cyclo-cross team IKO–Crelan.

Turning professional in 2019, she joined the Doltcini - NM Transport team. Later that year, she won the Belgian junior time trial title, before finishing 2nd at the 2019 UCI World Championships - Junior women's road race in Yorkshire, and placing 5th at the 2019 European Road Championships. Despite a disrupted 2020 season due to the COVID-19 pandemic, she won the Belgian National junior Cyclo-cross Championship. She joined the Plantur–Pura team at the start of 2021, taking part in her first UCI Women's World Tour event later that year. In 2022, she finished second at Dwars door Vlaanderen in Belgium, before wearing the white jersey at the Tour de France Femmes for three stages as the best placed rider under the age of 23.

== Major results ==
2019
1st Time trial, National Junior Road Championships
2nd Road race, UCI Junior Road World Championships
5th Road race, UEC European Junior Road Championships
2020
3rd Road race, National Junior Road Championships
7th Time trial, UEC European Junior Road Championships
2021
2nd Time trial, National Under-23 Road Championships
3rd Time trial, National Road Championships
8th Overall Tour de Feminin – O cenu Českého Švýcarska
9th Time trial, UEC European Under-23 Road Championships
2022
1st Grisette Grand Prix de Wallonie
1st Konvert Koerse
2nd Dwars door Vlaanderen
Tour de France Femmes

Held after stages 3–5

4th MerXem Classic
5th La Choralis Fourmies Féminine
7th Scheldeprijs
8th Road race, UCI Under-23 Road World Championships
9th GP Oetingen
10th Overall Holland Ladies Tour
2023
1st Flanders Diamond Tour
2nd Konvert Koerse
UCI Road World Under-23 Championships

2nd Time trial
4th Road race

4th Road race, National Road Championships
6th Time trial, UEC European Under-23 Road Championships
6th Dwars door de Westhoek
7th Omloop van het Hageland
7th Nokere Koerse
7th GP Oetingen
2024
3rd Time trial, UCI Road World Under-23 Championships
10th GP Eco-Struct
10th Dwars door Vlaanderen
2025
1st GP Oetingen
