= Antonia Niedermaier =

German cyclist and ski mountaineer (born 2003)

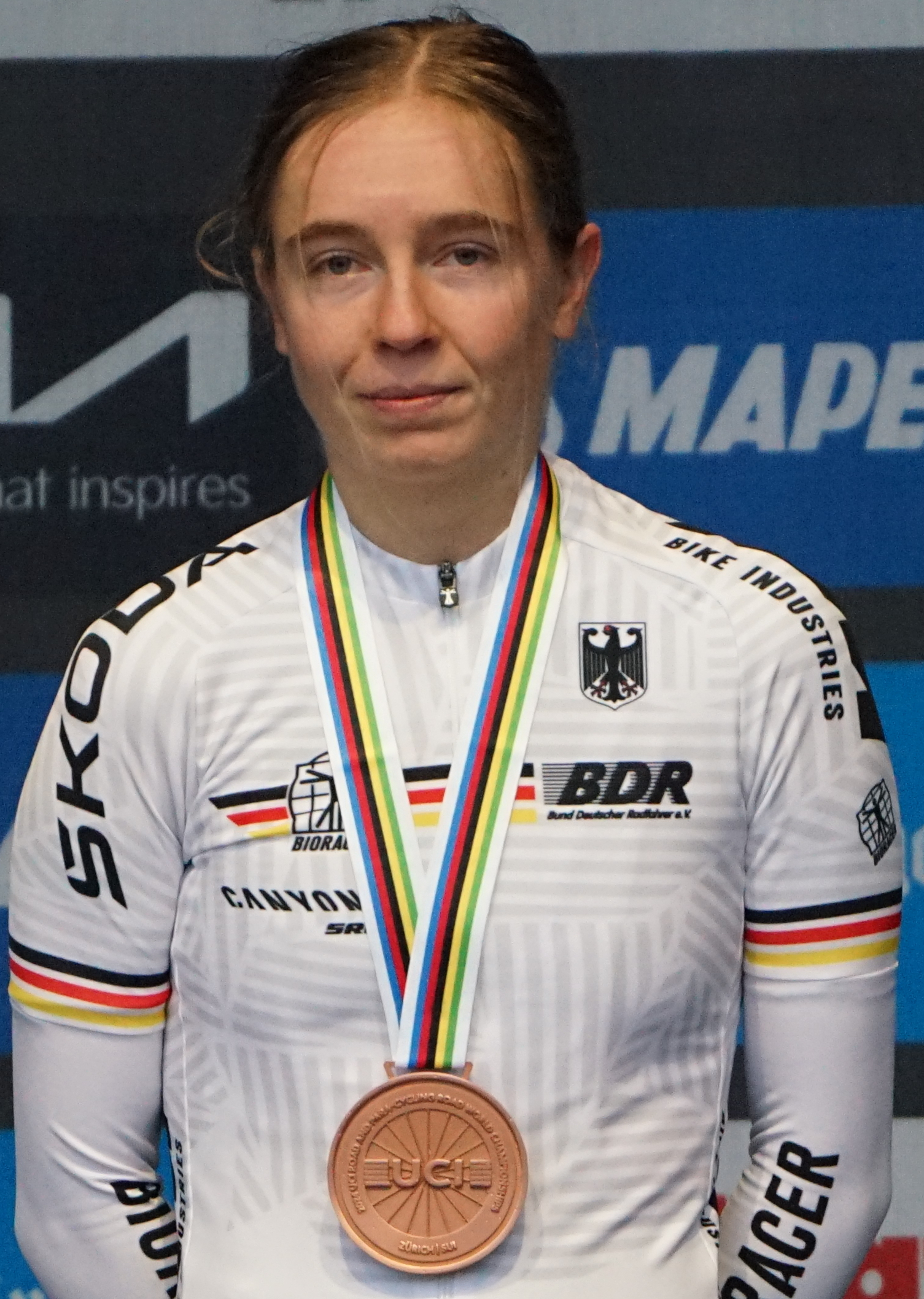
- Niedermaier at the 2024 UCI Road World Championships

Personal information
- Born: 20 February 2003 (age 23) Rosenheim, Bavaria, Germany
- Height: 1.63 m (5 ft 4 in)
- Weight: 52 kg (115 lb)

Cycling career
- Sport: Cycling
- Current team: Canyon//SRAM
- Role: Rider
- Rider type: All-rounder

Amateur team
- 2021: Mangertseder Bayern

Professional teams
- 2022: Canyon–SRAM Generation
- 2023–: Canyon//SRAM

Major wins
- Major Tours Tour de France Young rider classification (2026) Giro d'Italia Young rider classification (2025) 1 individual stage (2023)
Medal record
Women's road bicycle racing
Representing Germany
World Championships
Gold medal – first place	2023 Glasgow	Under-23 time trial
Gold medal – first place	2024 Zurich	Under-23 time trial
Silver medal – second place	2024 Zurich	Mixed team relay
Bronze medal – third place	2021 Flanders	Under-23 time trial
Bronze medal – third place	2024 Zurich	Under-23 road race
European Championships
Silver medal – second place	2023 Drenthe	Under-23 time trial
Silver medal – second place	2024 Limburg	Under-23 time trial

Antonia Niedermaier (born 20 February 2003) is a German cyclist and ski mountaineer. She rides for UCI Women's World Tour team Canyon//SRAM.

Niedermaier has performed strongly at the Giro d'Italia Women – winning a stage in 2023, winning the young rider classification in 2025 (finishing 5th overall), and finishing 2nd overall in 2026. Niedermaier won the under 23 individual time trial at the UCI Road World Championships on two occasions – 2023 and 2024. In 2025, she won the German National Time Trial Championships. In 2026, she performed strongly at the Tour de France Femmes, finishing 4th overall and winning the young rider classification.

== Early life ==
Niedermaier was born in Rosenheim, Bavaria, Germany. She later lived in Bad Aibling and Bruckmühl. At the age of 15, she started mountain running, but gave up the sport in 2019 due to injury.

== Ski mountaineering career ==
Niedermaier started ski mountaineering in 2019. That year, she finished third at the Junior World Championships, her first major event. She competed at the 2020 Winter Youth Olympics, finishing sixth in the individual event and 17th in the sprint competition. She was part of the German team that finished third in the mixed relay. Niedermaier won the 2020–21 U-20 Ski Mountaineering World Cup in both the individual and vertical events. She won multiple races in the World Cup season. Niedermaier planned to compete at the 2023 Ski Mountaineering World Championships, but was unable to after requiring knee surgery.

== Cycling career ==
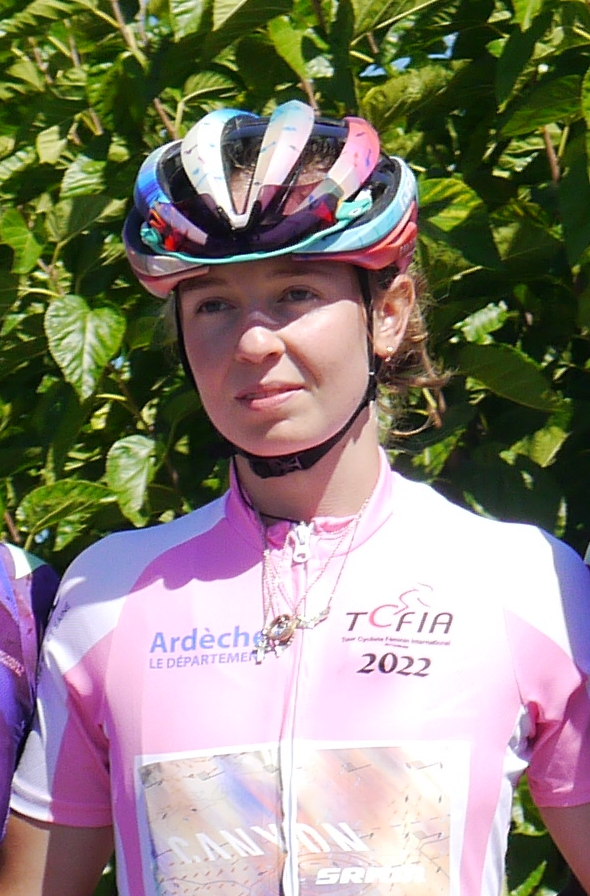
Niedermaier in 2022

=== Early career ===
Niedermaier started competing for the junior squad of local team Mangertseder Bayern. She won the 2021 German U-19 Road Championships time trial event, and came third in the road race. She also finished third at the World U-23 Road Championships, and second at the European U-23 Road Championships.

In 2022, Niedermaier started competing for Canyon-SRAM Generation. Niedermaier missed the first half of the 2022 season to focus on her studying. In 2022, she won two stages and the general classification at the Tour Cycliste Féminin International de l'Ardèche. She took the leader's jersey at the Tour de l'Ardèche after winning from a 83 km (52 mi) solo breakaway ride. That year, she also won the Classica de l'Arros and finished third at the German U-23 Road Championships.

=== Canyon–SRAM ===
Ahead of the 2023 season, Niedermaier was promoted to the UCI Women's World Tour team Canyon//SRAM. Her first race for the team was the Thüringen Ladies Tour; she crashed out on the third stage of the event. She finished third on the second stage of the 2023 Tour Féminin des Pyrénées, and won the Queen of the Mountains and young rider classifications. She won the time trial at the German U-23 Road Championships, and came sixth in the road race.

Later in 2023, Niedermaier competed at the 2023 Giro Donne, her first UCI Women's World Tour event. She won the fifth stage of the Giro Donne, the queen stage of the race, after attacking on the penultimate climb, around 25 kilometres (16 mi) from the finish. After the stage, she moved up to second in the race's general classification, and was leader of the young rider classification. She abandoned the race the following day following a crash with Urška Žigart.

Niedermaier won the women's under-23 time trial event at both the 2023 UCI Road World Championships and 2024 UCI Road World Championships.

In 2025, Niedermaier won the young rider classifications at the UAE Tour Women and Itzulia Women. Later that year, she extended her contract with Canyon//SRAM Zondacrypto to the end of the 2028 season. In July, she finished 5th overall in the Giro d'Italia Women and won the young rider classification, having worn the Maglia Bianca for the entire race.

In 2026, Niedermaier finished 2nd overall at the 2026 Giro d'Italia Women, behind winner Demi Vollering. She performed strongly throughout the race, finishing in the top 5 on four stages. She performed strongly at the Tour de France Femmes, with Cycling News praising her performance after she finished 4th overall and won the young rider classification.

== Major results ==
2021
2nd Time trial, UEC European Junior Road Championships
3rd Time trial, UCI World Junior Road Championships
2022
1st Overall Tour Cycliste Féminin International de l'Ardèche

1st Young rider classification
1st Stages 4 & 5

2nd Road race, National Under-23 Road Championships
5th Road race, National Road Championships
8th Visegrad 4 Ladies Race Slovakia
2023
1st Time trial, UCI Road World Under-23 Championships
1st Time trial, National Under-23 Road Championships
1st Stage 5 Giro Donne
2nd Time trial, UEC European Under-23 Road Championships
3rd Overall Tour Féminin des Pyrénées

1st Mountains classification
1st Young rider classification

4th Overall Tour de l'Avenir

1st Young rider classification
1st Stage 1 (ITT)

2024
1st Time trial, UCI Road World Under-23 Championships
4th UCI Road World Championships – Women's time trial
8th Grand Prix de Chambéry
2025
National Championships

1st Time trial
2nd Road Race

5th Overall Giro d'Italia

1st Young rider classification

6th UCI Road World Championships – Women's road race
6th UCI Road World Championships – Women's time trial
7th Overall UAE Tour

1st Young rider classification

7th Overall Itzulia Women

1st Young rider classification

8th Road Race, UEC European Championships
2026
2nd Overall Giro d'Italia
4th Overall Tour de France

1st Young rider classification

5th Overall Itzulia Women
7th UCI Road World Championships – Women's time trial
