= Marta Cavalli =

Italian cyclist (born 1998)

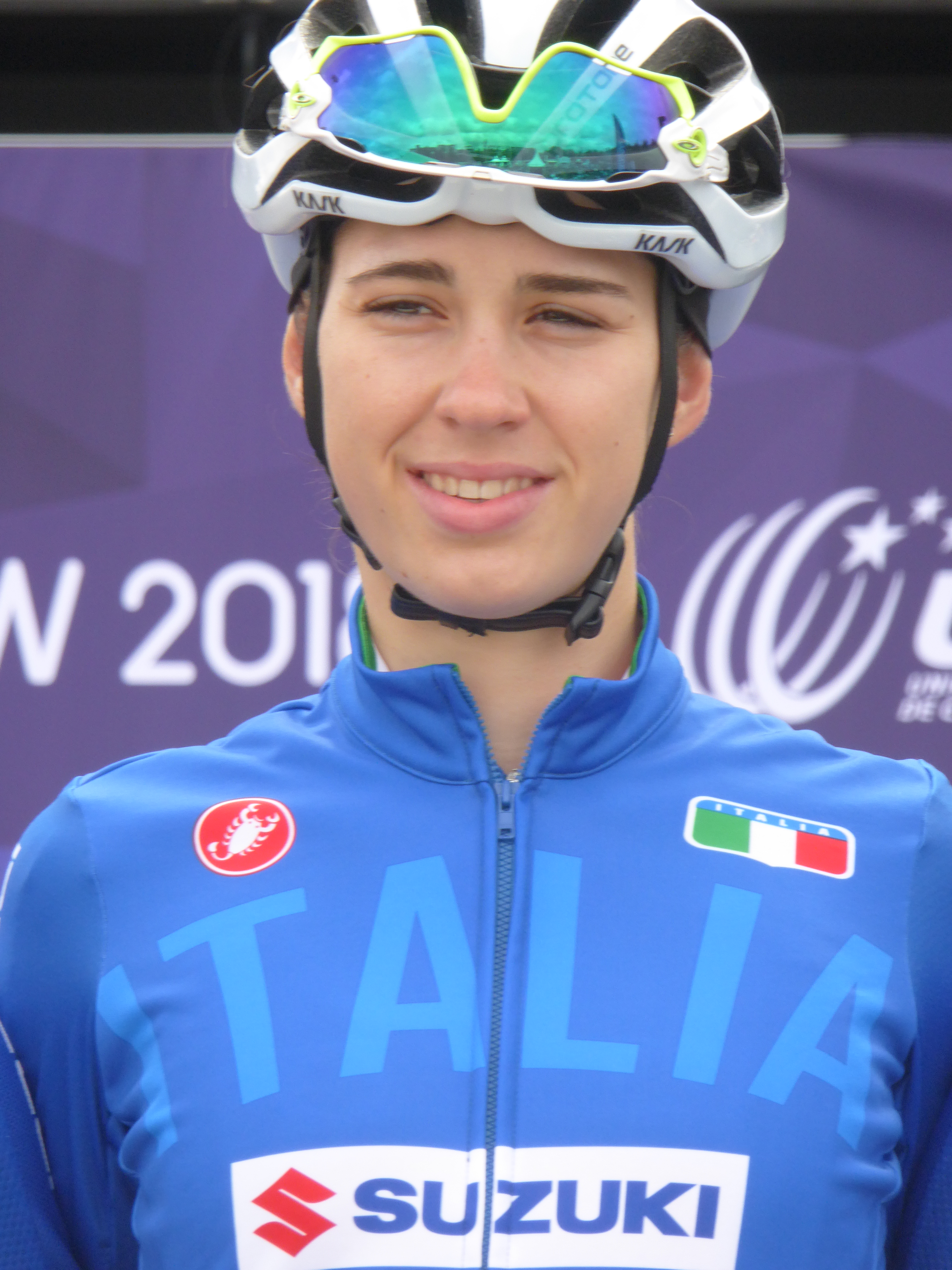
- Cavalli at the 2018 European Road Cycling Championships.

Personal information
- Full name: Marta Cavalli
- Born: 18 March 1998 (age 28) Cremona, Italy
- Height: 1.67 m (5 ft 6 in)
- Weight: 53 kg (117 lb)

Cycling career
- Sport: Cycling
- Current team: Team Picnic–PostNL
- Disciplines: Road; Track
- Role: Rider

Professional teams
- 2017–2020: Valcar–PBM
- 2021–2024: FDJ Nouvelle-Aquitaine Futuroscope
- 2025–: Team Picnic–PostNL

Major wins
- National Road Race Championships (2018); Amstel Gold Race (2022); La Flèche Wallonne Féminine (2022)
Medal record
Representing Italy
Women's track cycling
European Games
Gold medal – first place	2019 Minsk	Team pursuit
Silver medal – second place	2019 Minsk	Individual pursuit
European Championships
Silver medal – second place	2018 Glasgow	Team pursuit
Bronze medal – third place	2019 Apeldoorn	Team pursuit
Women's road bicycle racing
World Championships
Bronze medal – third place	2021 Flanders	Mixed team relay
European Championships
Gold medal – first place	2021 Trentino	Mixed team relay

Marta Cavalli (born 18 March 1998) is an Italian racing cyclist, who currently rides for UCI Women's WorldTeam Team Picnic–PostNL. In 2018, she won the Italian National Road Race Championships. She competed at the 2020 Summer Olympics, in the road race – finishing 8th overall.

In 2022, Cavalli won two of the Ardennes classics – Amstel Gold Race and La Flèche Wallonne Féminine. She then finished second at Giro Donne. In July 2022, she was named as one of the pre-race favourites for the first edition of the Tour de France Femmes, however Cavalli crashed heavily on stage 2 and had to abandon the race. This impacted her, with Cavalli not immediately returning to the same form as previously. Two further injuries in 2024 disrupted her full return to racing, with Cavalli announcing that she would leave the FDJ–Suez team at the end of the season to join Team Picnic PostNL.

== Major results ==
=== Road ===
2015
3rd Time trial, National Juniors Road Championships
2018
1st Road race, National Road Championships
8th Trofee Maarten Wynants
9th Omloop Het Nieuwsblad
2019
2nd Overall Giro delle Marche in Rosa

1st Stage 1

2nd Brabantse Pijl
2020
5th Emakumeen Saria
5th Gent–Wevelgem
2021
UEC European Road Championships

1st Team relay
6th Road race

4th Overall Challenge by La Vuelta
5th Emakumeen Nafarroako Klasikoa
6th Tour of Flanders
8th Strade Bianche
9th Paris–Roubaix
2022
1st Amstel Gold Race
1st La Flèche Wallonne Féminine
1st Mont Ventoux Dénivelé Challenge
2nd Overall Giro Donne
3rd Time trial, National Road Championships
3rd Overall Setmana Ciclista Valenciana
4th Overall Itzulia Women
5th Paris–Roubaix
6th Liège–Bastogne–Liège
6th Giro dell'Emilia Internazionale Donne Elite
2023
1st Overall Tour Cycliste Féminin International de l'Ardèche

1st Mountains classification
1st Stage 5

1st Overall Tour Féminin International des Pyrénées

1st Stage 2

National Road Championships

2nd Time trial
3rd Road race

2nd Giro dell'Emilia Internazionale Donne Elite
2024
9th La Flèche Wallonne

==== Classics results timeline ====
Monument	2017	2018	2019	2020	2021	2022	2023	2024	2025
Milan–San Remo Women	Not held								13
Tour of Flanders	—	DNF	11	10	6	27	—	—	
Paris–Roubaix	Race did not exist			NH	—	5	—	—	
Liège–Bastogne–Liège	—	—	27	18	14	6	23	71	
Classic	2017	2018	2019	2020	2021	2022	2023	2024	2025
Omloop Het Nieuwsblad	—	9	—	—	9	—	DNF	—	—
Strade Bianche	DNF	OTL	40	DNF	8	—	—	—	36
Ronde van Drenthe	—	70	DNF	NH	—	—	—	—	NH
Trofeo Alfredo Binda	DNF	—	13	NH	35	23	13	49	22
Gent–Wevelgem	—	DNF	10	5	26	41	—	—	
Amstel Gold Race	—	DNF	33	NH	83	1	DNF	—	
La Flèche Wallonne	—	—	30	17	DNS	1	79	9	
Open de Suède Vårgårda	—	19	6	Not held		—	Not held		

Legend
—	Did not compete
DNS	Did not start
DNF	Did not finish
OTL	Over the time limit
IP	In progress
NH	Not held

=== Track ===
2015
1st Team Pursuit, European Juniors Track Championships

2016
1st Team Pursuit, National Juniors Track Championships

2017
1st Team Pursuit, European U23 Track Championships
UCI Track Cycling World Cup – Santiago

2nd Team Pursuit
3rd Madison

2018
European Under–23 Track Championships

1st Individual Pursuit
1st Team Pursuit

2nd Team Pursuit, European Track Championships
2nd Madison, National Track Championships
UCI Track Cycling World Cup

2nd Team Pursuit – Minsk
2nd Team Pursuit – Milton
3rd Team Pursuit – London
3rd Team Pursuit – Saint-Quentin-en-Yvelines

2019
European Games

1st Team Pursuit
2nd Individual Pursuit

UEC European Track Championships

1st Derny
3rd Team Pursuit

1st Team Pursuit, European U23 Track Championships
UCI Track Cycling World Cup

1st Team Pursuit – Hong Kong
3rd Team Pursuit – Cambridge
3rd Team Pursuit – Minsk

2020
1st Team Pursuit, European U23 Track Championships

== See also ==
- List of 2018 UCI Women's Teams and riders
