= 2022 Tour de France Femmes =

Cycling race

2022 UCI Women's World Tour, race 16 of 23
- Route of the 2022 Tour de France Femmes

Race details
- Dates: 24–31 July 2022
- Stages: 8
- Distance: 1,033.6 km (642.2 mi)
- Winning time: 26 h 55 m 44 s

Results
Jersey awarded to the overall winner	Winner	Annemiek van Vleuten (NED)	(Movistar Team)
	Second	Demi Vollering (NED)	(SD Worx)
	Third	Katarzyna Niewiadoma (POL)	(Canyon//SRAM)
Jersey awarded to the points classification winner	Points	Marianne Vos (NED)	(Team Jumbo–Visma)
Jersey awarded to the mountains classification winner	Mountains	Demi Vollering (NED)	(SD Worx)
Jersey awarded to the young rider classification winner	Young rider	Shirin van Anrooij (NED)	(Trek–Segafredo)
Jersey awarded to the combativity classification winner	Combativity	Marianne Vos (NED)	(Team Jumbo–Visma)
Jersey awarded to the team classification winner	Team	(Germany) Canyon//SRAM	

The 2022 Tour de France Femmes (officially 2022 Tour de France Femmes avec Zwift) was the first edition of the Tour de France Femmes, a professional women's cycling race which took place from 24 to 31 July. It was the 16th event in the 2022 UCI Women's World Tour. The Tour consisted of 8 stages, covering a distance of 1,033 kilometres (642 mi).

Starting in 1955, various cycling races for women have been held similar to the Tour de France for men, using different names (for example, Tour de France Féminin and Grande Boucle Féminine Internationale) and to a shorter length, unlike the three-weeks races for the men. The first edition of Tour de France Femmes followed years of campaigning by the women's professional peloton for an equivalent race to the men's Tour de France.

The race was won by Annemiek van Vleuten (Movistar Team), taking the general classification (GC) leader's yellow jersey by winning both mountain stages in the latter part of the race. Demi Vollering (SD Worx) finished in second place after placing behind van Vleuten on both mountain stages. Vollering also took the polka-dot jersey as winner of the Queen of the Mountains (QoM) classification. Third place went to Katarzyna Niewiadoma (Canyon//SRAM), who secured a podium position after top five finishes on both mountain stages.

Marianne Vos (Team Jumbo–Visma) won the green jersey for the points classification following top five finishes in the first six stages, including two wins, as well as the super-combativity award for the most combative rider. Another two stages were won by sprinter Lorena Wiebes (Team DSM). Shirin van Anrooij (Trek–Segafredo) took the white jersey as the winner of the young rider classification, which was awarded to the best-placed GC rider under the age of 23. Canyon//SRAM won the team classification as the team with the lowest aggregate time among their three best-placed riders. Overall, the race drew large crowds, had substantial international media coverage, and was highly praised by the public, media, teams, and riders.

== Background ==
The Tour de France is an annual men's multiple-stage bicycle race held primarily in France, with the first race in 1903. It takes place over 21 stages across three weeks in July. Various professional women's cycle stage races across France have been held as an equivalent race for women, with the first taking place as a one off event in 1955. Between 1984 and 2009, a women's Tour de France was staged consistently, using the Tour de France Féminin name from 1984 to 1989. Several race organisers subsequently ran events such as the Tour Cycliste Féminin and Grande Boucle Féminine Internationale. These races struggled with financial difficulties, limited media coverage, sexism, and trademark issues with the organisers of the Tour de France, Amaury Sport Organisation (ASO).

=== La Course by Le Tour de France ===
In 2013, activist group Le Tour Entier (“the whole tour”) began pushing for a revival of the women's Tour de France and other improvements to women's cycling. Following substantial media coverage, and a petition signed by over 100,000 people, ASO launched La Course by Le Tour de France in 2014. The one-day stage race took place prior to the final stage of the men's race in Paris. Between 2014 and 2021, La Course was held in a variety of locations across France in conjunction with the men's race, with ASO arguing that this was the "best way to shine a light on female cycling".

La Course was initially praised, with sponsors welcoming the live TV coverage and visibility of taking place alongside the men's race. However, La Course was criticised by campaigners and riders for being overshadowed by the men's Tour de France, not having enough stages, and not being challenging enough for the professional peloton. Organisers were also criticised for not doing enough to promote the race. Riders and campaigners pushed for La Course to evolve into a longer race with more stages, with mountain stages and time trials. Pushing back at criticism, ASO noted that they were unable to stage a men's and women's Tour de France simultaneously due to logistical issues, and that races must be financially sustainable.

=== Tour de France Femmes ===
In May 2021, ASO announced that they would launch a new women's stage race, Tour de France Femmes. The first edition was to be held over 8 days in July 2022, following the 2022 Tour de France. The men's tour director, Christian Prudhomme commented that lessons must be learned from the failure of previous events, with the aim of a financially sustainable event, one "that will still exist in 100 years". The reaction from the professional women's peloton was overwhelmingly positive, with Dutch rider Anna van der Breggen stating "it's long been a dream for many of us to compete in a women's Tour de France", and Danish rider Cecilie Uttrup Ludwig commenting "this is a day that we’ve waited for, for a long time". ASO also announced that multiplayer online cycling platform Zwift had signed a four-year agreement to sponsor the race, as Tour de France Femmes avec Zwift.

== Teams ==
The 24 teams which participated in the race were announced on 30 March 2022. All 14 UCI Women's WorldTeams were automatically invited. They were joined by 10 UCI Women's Continental Teams: the three best 2021 UCI Women's Continental Teams (Ceratizit–WNT Pro Cycling, Parkhotel Valkenburg and Valcar–Travel & Service) received an automatic invitation, and the other seven teams were selected by the organisers of the Tour. A total of 144 riders from 25 nationalities started the race, with the Netherlands having the largest contingent (29 riders).

UCI Women's WorldTeams

- Canyon//SRAM
- EF Education–Tibco–SVB
- FDJ Suez Futuroscope
- Human Powered Health
- Liv Racing Xstra
- Movistar Team
- Roland Cogeas Edelweiss Squad
- SD Worx
- Team BikeExchange–Jayco
- Team DSM
- Team Jumbo–Visma
- Trek–Segafredo
- UAE Team ADQ
- Uno-X Pro Cycling Team

UCI Women's Continental Teams

- AG Insurance–NXTG
- Arkéa Pro Cycling Team
- Ceratizit–WNT Pro Cycling
- Cofidis
- Le Col–Wahoo
- Parkhotel Valkenburg
- Plantur–Pura
- Stade Rochelais Charente-Maritime
- St. Michel–Auber93
- Valcar–Travel & Service

== Route and stages ==
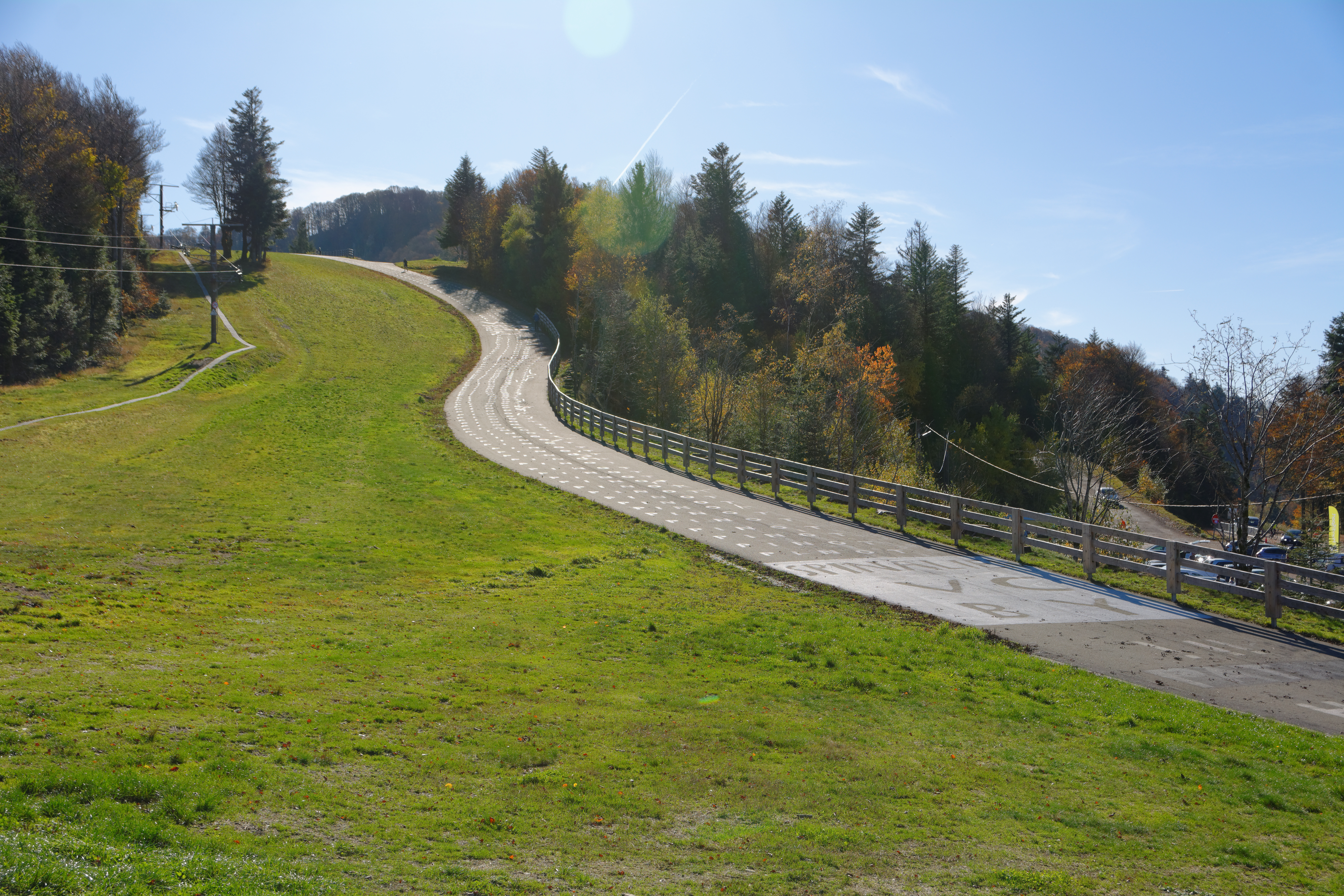
The final stage of the race finished at the La Super Planche des Belles Filles climb.

In October 2021, the route was announced by race director Marion Rousse. It comprised eight consecutive days of racing, covering a total of 1,033 kilometres (642 mi). The race started with a stage on the Champs-Élysées in Paris, on the same day as the final stage of the men's tour. The route generally headed eastwards from Paris, with gravel sections in Champagne vineyards on stage 4, stages in the Vosges mountains (including the longest, stage 5), and a summit finish on stage 8 at La Super Planche des Belles Filles. Climbs were categorised from category 4 (the easiest) to category 1 (the most difficult), with no hors catégorie (English: beyond category) climbs on the route.

The route was welcomed by the professional peloton and campaigners such as Kathryn Bertine, with praise for the variety of stages. Rouleur considered that the mountainous terrain of the last two stages could mean that the winner could be unknown "until the riders cross the finish line on the final stage". The overall length of the event was met with agreement, with some teams noting that they do not "yet have the staff or numbers" for a race three weeks in length (such as the men's Tour de France).

The route itself required a waiver from the Union Cycliste Internationale (UCI), as Women's WorldTour races in 2022 have a maximum stage length of 160 kilometres (99 mi) and a maximum race length of six days. The restrictions were criticised by the professional peloton and campaigners as "sexist", as the UCI does not allow women to compete over identical distances as men.

Stage characteristics
Stage	Date	Course	Distance	Type	Winner
1	24 July	Paris: Tour Eiffel to Champs-Élysées	81.6 km (50.7 mi)	Flat stage	Lorena Wiebes (NED)
2	25 July	Meaux to Provins	136.4 km (84.8 mi)	Hilly stage	Marianne Vos (NED)
3	26 July	Reims to Épernay	133.6 km (83.0 mi)	Hilly stage	Cecilie Uttrup Ludwig (DEN)
4	27 July	Troyes to Bar-sur-Aube	126.8 km (78.8 mi)	Medium-mountain stage	Marlen Reusser (SUI)
5	28 July	Bar-le-Duc to Saint-Dié-des-Vosges	175.6 km (109.1 mi)	Flat stage	Lorena Wiebes (NED)
6	29 July	Saint-Dié-des-Vosges to Rosheim	129.2 km (80.3 mi)	Hilly stage	Marianne Vos (NED)
7	30 July	Sélestat to Le Markstein	127.1 km (79.0 mi)	Mountain stage	Annemiek van Vleuten (NED)
8	31 July	Lure to La Super Planche des Belles Filles	123.3 km (76.6 mi)	Mountain stage	Annemiek van Vleuten (NED)
Total			1,033.6 km (642.2 mi)		

== Race overview ==
Annemiek van Vleuten, Demi Vollering, Elisa Longo Borghini, Ashleigh Moolman, Cecilie Uttrup Ludwig, Marta Cavalli and Katarzyna Niewiadoma were all named as pre-race favourites for the general classification (GC), which determines the overall winner of the race. The sprinters tipped for winning the points classification were Lorena Wiebes and Elisa Balsamo. The Queen of the Mountains (QoM) classification (similar to King of the Mountains classification in the men's race) would be won by the best climber in the race, with the media noting Uttrup Ludwig, Niewiadoma and Vollering as contenders. Overall, the field of 144 was described as "packed with talent", with the top 28 riders in the UCI rankings all taking part.

Media coverage prior to the event was positive, calling the race a "historic moment for women's cycling" and "game changing". There was some criticism of the €250,000 prize fund, compared to the €2.2 million prize fund for the men's race. ASO noted that the prize fund was larger than men's races of similar length – such as the Critérium du Dauphiné. Riders from The Cyclists' Alliance – a union representing the female peloton – stated that live TV coverage for races was their biggest priority, rather than prize money.

=== Stages 1 to 6 ===
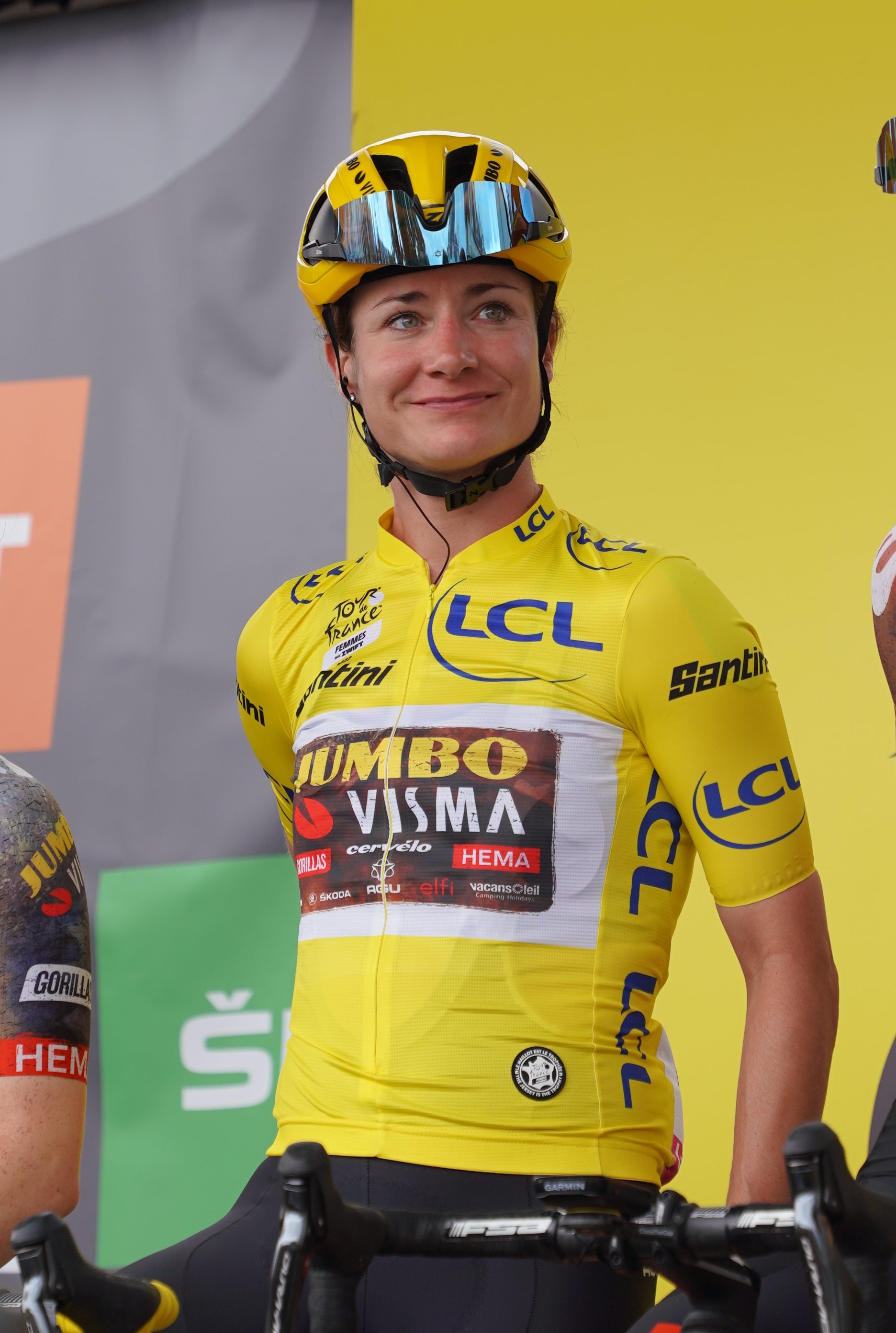
Winner of stages 2 and 6, Marianne Vos

Stage 1 of the Tour took place on 24 July in Paris, with a start beneath the Eiffel Tower and eight laps around the Champs-Élysées (on the traditional circuit which concluded the men's tour later that day). In a bunch sprint finish, Wiebes (Team DSM) outsprinted Marianne Vos (Jumbo–Visma) to take the first yellow jersey of the race, as well as the green jersey of the points classification. Stage 2 to Provins was marred by multiple crashes in the final 30 kilometres (19 mi), with Cavalli (FDJ Suez Futuroscope) having to abandon the race as a result. Van Vleuten (Movistar Team) also came close to abandoning the race after suffering from a stomach infection and being unable to eat or drink. At the finish, Vos outsprinted a small group to take the yellow and green jerseys, assisted by bonus seconds available to the first 3 finishers.

Stage 3 took place on rolling terrain, with a final loop into Épernay. On the Côte de Mutigny, several riders contending for the general classification broke away from the peloton. On the final steep climb to the finish, Uttrup Ludwig (FDJ Suez Futuroscope) outsprinted the group to take the stage while Femke Gerritse (Parkhotel Valkenburg) took the lead in the QoM classification.

Stage 4 to Bar-sur-Aube was another hilly stage, its final half having four gravel sections in Champagne vineyards. Multiple riders including Niewiadoma (Canyon//SRAM), Longo Borghini (Trek–Segafredo), Uttrup Ludwig and van Vleuten suffered punctures and other issues but most of them were able to rejoin the peloton and not lose time. Mavi García (UAE Team ADQ) was hit by her team car while trying to catch up to the main field after two punctures, causing her to lose time. With around 25 kilometres (16 mi) remaining, Marlen Reusser (SD Worx) attacked, riding solo to win the stage by nearly a minute and a half.

Continuing east across France, stage 5 to Saint-Dié-des-Vosges was the longest of the 2022 Women's WorldTour calendar at 175.6 kilometres (109.1 mi). With around 45 kilometres (28 mi) left, a crash in the peloton took down several riders, with Emma Norsgaard (Movistar Team) having to abandon. In the final sprint, Wiebes overtook Balsamo and Vos to secure her second stage win. In the GC, Vos kept the yellow jersey, extending her advantage to 20 seconds due to bonuses. Stage 6 to Rosheim was a hilly stage, with four categorised climbs and another climb with bonus seconds at the top. On the descent of the penultimate climb, a small group including Wiebes and Lotte Kopecky (SD Worx) crashed, but everyone involved ultimately finished the stage. A group of 14 riders who had been ahead of the peloton in a breakaway were caught in the closing kilometres, with the stage win contested by a large group of riders in a bunch sprint. Vos outsprinted Marta Bastianelli (UAE Team ADQ) and Kopecky to win her second stage of the race. In the GC, Vos extended her advantage due to the ten bonus seconds she gained for the stage win.

=== Mountain stages ===
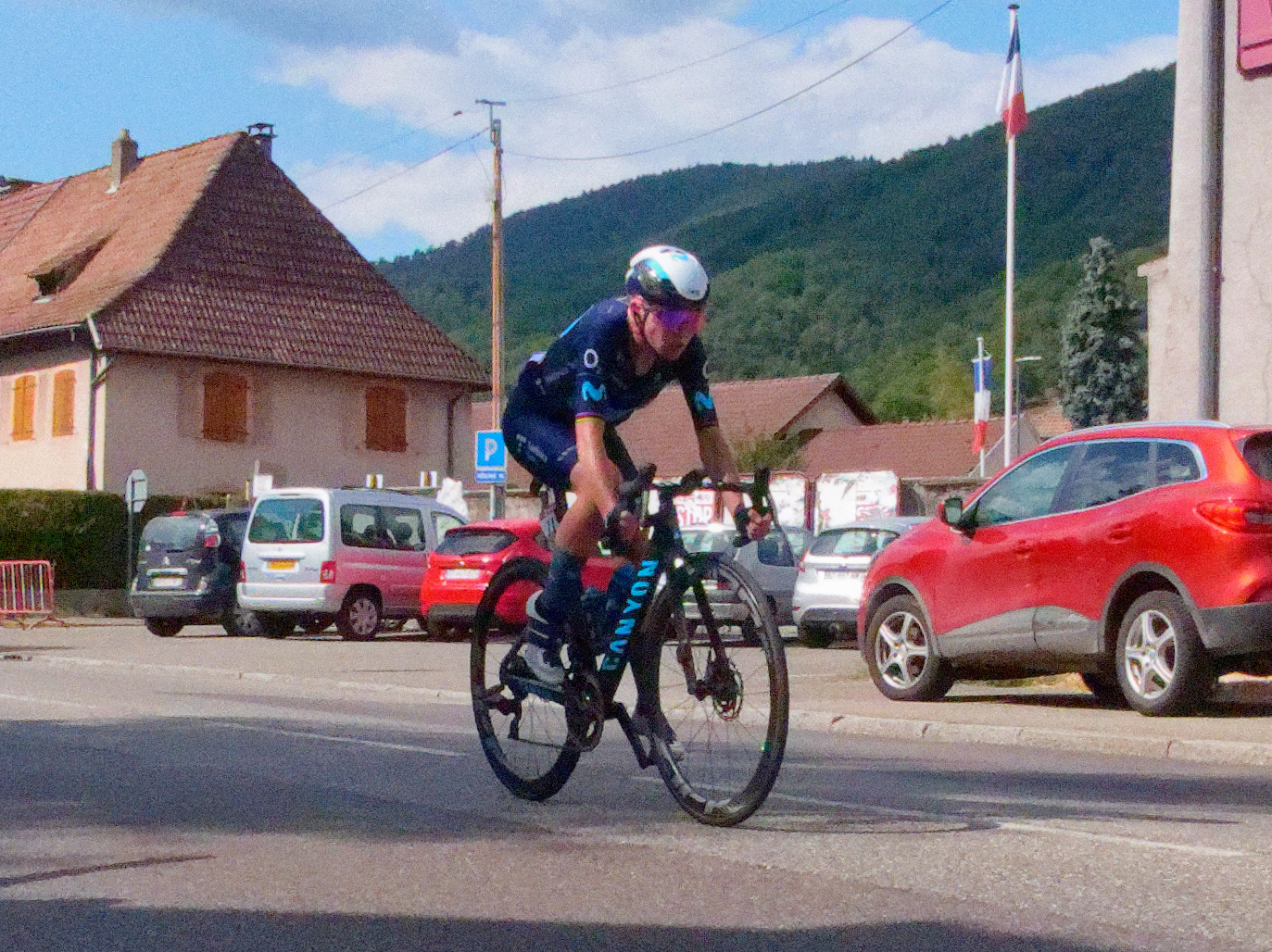
Annemiek van Vleuten on her solo attack for the yellow jersey on stage 7

Stages 7 and 8 took place in the Vosges mountains in Grand Est, with five category 1 climbs over the two days, and two summit finishes. The difficulty of the two stages meant they were considered to be queen stages, likely to decide the eventual winner of the GC.

Stage 7 was 127.1 km (79.0 mi) in length, with 3,000 metres (9,800 ft) of climbing, including the Grand Ballon. On Petit Ballon, the first climb of the day, Vos could not keep with the pace of the GC contenders, and fell behind with a group of slower riders. Meanwhile, having started the stage with stitches in her elbow following her crash on stage 6, Wiebes abandoned the race. On the Petit Ballon, with 86 kilometres (53 mi) remaining, van Vleuten broke away from the peloton with only Demi Vollering (SD Worx) able to match her pace. A chase group with most of the other GC contenders formed behind them. A kilometre (0.6 mi) from the top of the Col du Platzerwasel, the second climb of the day, van Vleuten accelerated ahead of Vollering. Van Vleuten extended her lead to almost four minutes by the final climb of the Grand Ballon. Van Vleuten lost some time to Vollering on the final plateau section, but nevertheless won the stage, 3 min 26 s ahead of Vollering, who took the polka-dot jersey as leader of the QoM. In the GC, van Vleuten took the yellow jersey, more than three minutes ahead of Vollering while Niewiadoma took third place, four and a half minutes behind van Vleuten. Vos finished the stage over 24 minutes behind the stage winner, losing the yellow jersey. Despite this, she continued to hold the green jersey, owing to the large number of points she had collected in previous stages.

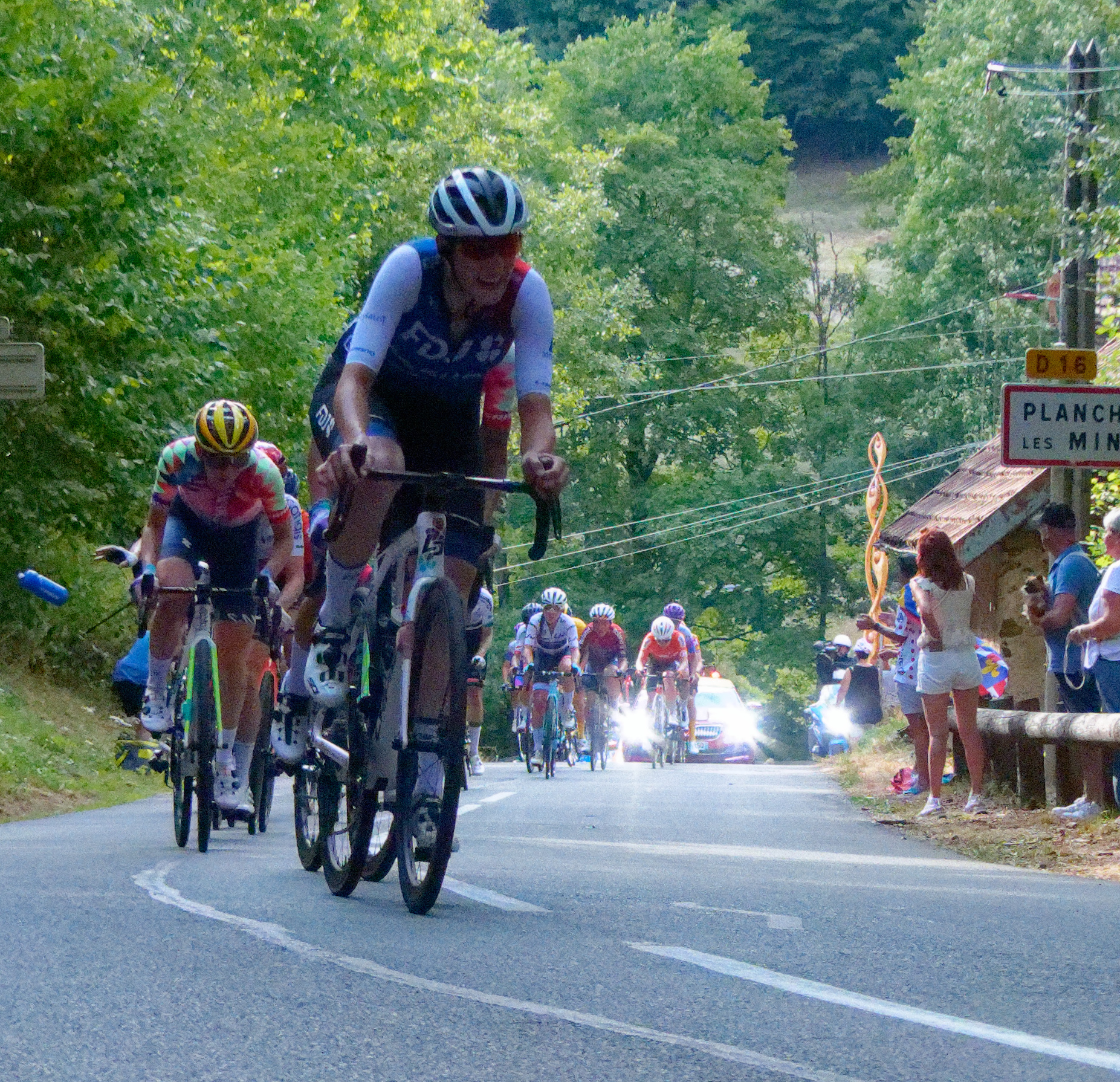
Riders on Stage 8 at Plancher-les-Mines

Stage 8 was the second mountain stage of the Tour, with three categorised climbs during the 123.3 km (76.6 mi) long stage. The final climb to La Super Planche des Belles Filles was 7 kilometres (4.3 mi) long with an average gradient of 8.7 percent, with the last kilometre featuring an extended gravel section with gradients as high as 24 percent. On the first climb, no break had been established and Vollering was able to take maximum points to extend her lead in the QoM classification. A group of ten riders broke away from the main field, however the peloton did not give them a large headway, given the two large climbs later on the stage. With 57 kilometres (35 mi) to go, van Vleuten suffered an issue with her bike and SD Worx and Trek–Segafredo increased the pace of the peloton. Van Vleuten rejoined the peloton with around 45 kilometres (28 mi) left in the stage at the foot of the second climb, the Ballon d'Alsace. On the climb, van Vleuten made four more bike changes but she quickly made it back to the peloton each time. On the final climb to La Super Planche des Belles Filles, van Vleuten launched a solo attack from the peloton with 6 kilometres (3.7 mi) remaining. She passed the remnants of the breakaway group with Vollering in pursuit. Much like the previous day, a chase group of GC contenders formed behind them. Van Vleuten gradually extended her lead and won the stage and the Tour title. Vollering finished 30 seconds behind, confirming her win in the QoM classification.

=== Results ===
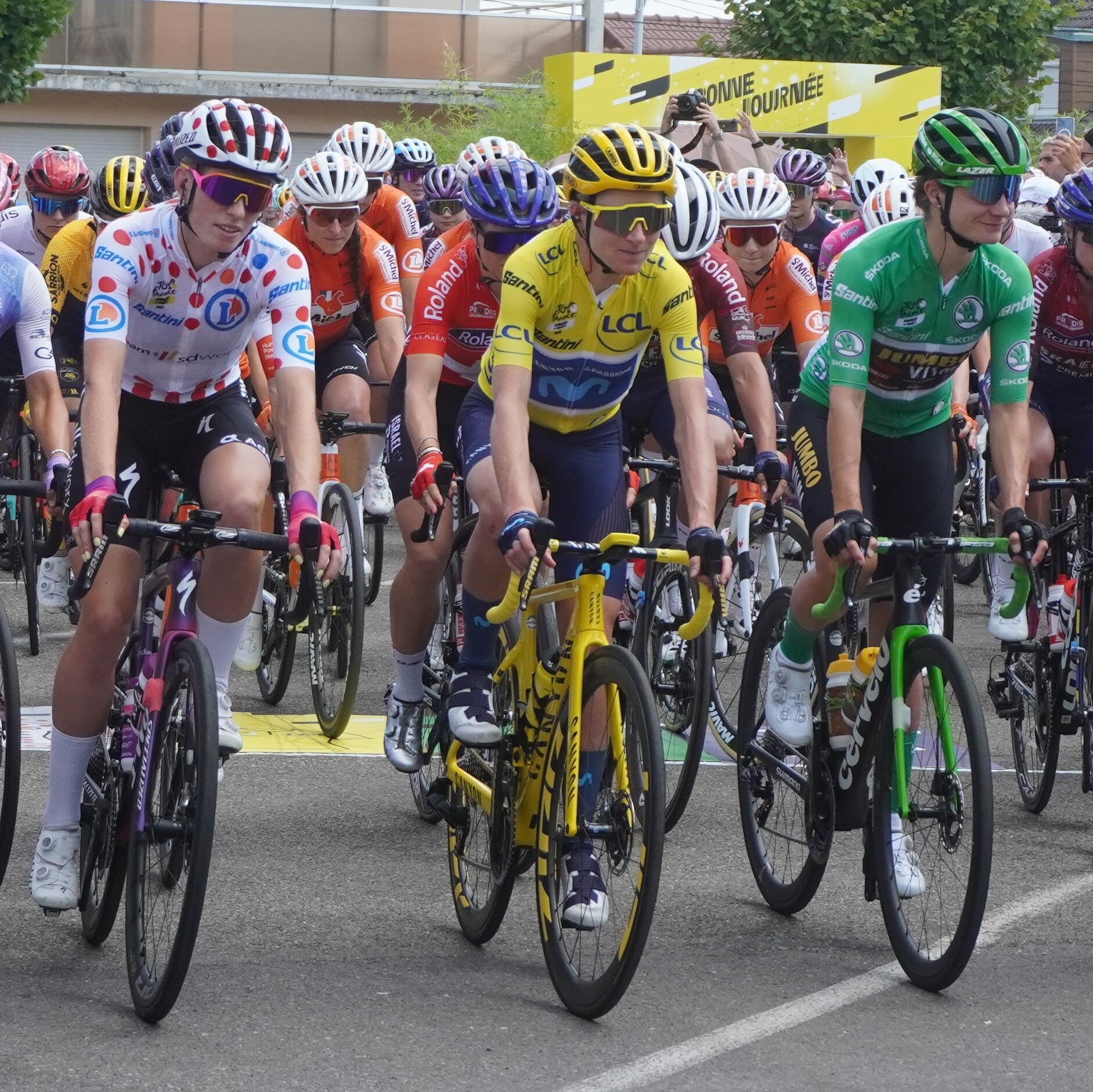
Annemiek van Vleuten in the yellow jersey (centre), Marianne Vos in the green jersey (right) and Demi Vollering in the polka-dot jersey (left)

Van Vleuten (Movistar Team) won the Tour de France Femmes with an advantage over Vollering (SD Worx) of almost four minutes. Niewiadoma took third place overall, six and a half minutes behind van Vleuten, maintaining her position by finishing in the top five on both mountain stages. Vollering won the Queen of the Mountains (QoM) classification while Vos (Team Jumbo–Visma) won the points classification and the super-combativity award for the most combative rider, after finishing in the top five on the first six stages, with wins on stages 2 and 6. Shirin van Anrooij (Trek–Segafredo) won the young rider classification for the best-placed GC rider under the age of 23. The team classification was won by Canyon//SRAM as the team with the lowest aggregate time among their three best-placed riders. Out of 144 starters, 109 finished the event.

Van Vleuten expressed that she was "super proud" to have won, saying that winning in yellow was "a dream come true". Vollering considered that she had performed well throughout the race and therefore had "nothing to regret". Other riders praised the event, with Niewiadoma noting it was one of the most difficult races that the women's peloton has taken part in, and fourth-placed Juliette Labous (Team DSM) explained that she was surprised by the large crowds, stating "I didn't expect this much, I knew there would be a lot of people but I didn't expect as much as this."

== Classification leadership ==
There were four main individual classifications contested in the 2022 Tour de France Femmes, as well as a team competition. The most important was the general classification, which was calculated by adding each rider's finishing times on each stage. Bonus seconds were awarded at all stage finishes – with ten, six and four bonus seconds awarded to the first three finishers. Bonus seconds were also available on certain mountain climbs during the race – with three, two and one bonus seconds awarded to the first three riders to reach the top of the climb. The rider with the lowest cumulative time was the winner of the general classification and was considered the overall winner of the Tour de France Femmes. The rider leading the classification wore a yellow jersey.

The second classification was the points classification. Riders received points for finishing in the top fifteen positions in a stage finish, or in intermediate sprints during the stage. The points available for each stage finish were determined by the stage's type, with flat stages awarding more points than mountain stages. The leader was identified by a green jersey.

The third classification was the mountains classification. Most stages of the race included one or more categorised climbs, in which points were awarded to the riders that reached the summit first. Climbs were categorised with category 4 being the easiest and category 1 the hardest. There were no hors catégorie climbs on the route. Category 4 awarded two riders, the first with 2 points, and the second with 1 point; category 3 awarded three riders, the first with 3 points; category 2 awarded four riders, the first with 5 points; and category 1 awarded six riders, the first with 10 points. The leader wore a white jersey with red polka dots.

The final individual classification was the young rider classification. This was calculated the same way as the general classification, but the classification was restricted to riders under the age of 23. The leader wore a white jersey.

The final classification was a team classification. This was calculated using the finishing times of the best three riders per team on each stage; the leading team was the team with the lowest cumulative time. The number of stage victories and placings per team determined the outcome of a tie. The riders in the team that lead this classification were identified with yellow number bibs on the back of their jerseys.

In addition, there was a combativity award given after each stage to the rider considered, by a jury, to have demonstrated effort and sportsmanship. The winner wore a red number bib the following stage. At the conclusion of the Tour, the jury awarded the super-combativity award to the rider who demonstrated this throughout the race.

Classification leadership by stage
Stage	Winner	General classification	Points classification	Mountains classification	Young rider classification	Team classification	Combativity award
1	Lorena Wiebes	Lorena Wiebes	Lorena Wiebes (Note: On stage 2, Lotte Kopecky, who was second in the points classification, wore the green jersey, because first placed Lorena Wiebes wore the yellow jersey as the leader of the general classification.)	Femke Markus	Maike van der Duin	Canyon//SRAM	Gladys Verhulst
2	Marianne Vos	Marianne Vos	Marianne Vos (Note: On stages 3–7, Lorena Wiebes, who was second in the points classification, wore the green jersey, because first placed Marianne Vos wore the yellow jersey as the leader of the general classification.)	Femke Markus	Maike van der Duin	Canyon//SRAM	Maike van der Duin
3	Cecilie Uttrup Ludwig	Marianne Vos	Marianne Vos	Femke Gerritse	Julie De Wilde	Canyon//SRAM	Alena Amialiusik
4	Marlen Reusser	Marianne Vos	Marianne Vos	Femke Gerritse	Julie De Wilde	SD Worx	Marlen Reusser
5	Lorena Wiebes	Marianne Vos	Marianne Vos	Femke Gerritse	Julie De Wilde	SD Worx	Victoire Berteau
6	Marianne Vos	Marianne Vos	Marianne Vos	Femke Gerritse	Julia Borgström	SD Worx	Marie Le Net
7	Annemiek van Vleuten	Annemiek van Vleuten	Marianne Vos	Demi Vollering	Shirin van Anrooij	Canyon//SRAM	Annemiek van Vleuten
8	Annemiek van Vleuten	Annemiek van Vleuten	Marianne Vos	Demi Vollering	Shirin van Anrooij	Canyon//SRAM	Mavi García
Final		Annemiek van Vleuten	Marianne Vos	Demi Vollering	Shirin van Anrooij	Canyon//SRAM	Marianne Vos

== Final classification standings ==
Legend
Denotes the leader of the General classification	Denotes the leader of the Mountains classification
Denotes the leader of the Points classification	Denotes the leader of the Young rider (under 23) classification
Denotes the leader of the Team classification	Denotes the winner of the Combativity award

=== General classification ===
Final general classification (1–10)
Rank	Rider	Team	Time
1	Annemiek van Vleuten (NED)	Movistar Team	26 h 55 min 44 s
2	Demi Vollering (NED)	SD Worx	+ 3 min 48 s
3	Katarzyna Niewiadoma (POL)	Canyon//SRAM	+ 6 min 35 s
4	Juliette Labous (FRA)	Team DSM	+ 7 min 28 s
5	Silvia Persico (ITA)	Valcar–Travel & Service	+ 8 min 00 s
6	Elisa Longo Borghini (ITA)	Trek–Segafredo	+ 8 min 26 s
7	Cecilie Uttrup Ludwig (DEN)	FDJ Suez Futuroscope	+ 8 min 59 s
8	Évita Muzic (FRA)	FDJ Suez Futuroscope	+ 13 min 54 s
9	Veronica Ewers (USA)	EF Education–Tibco–SVB	+ 15 min 05 s
10	Mavi García (ESP)	UAE Team ADQ	+ 15 min 15 s

Final general classification (11–109)
Rank	Rider	Team	Time
11	Elise Chabbey (SUI)	Canyon//SRAM	+ 16 min 44 s
12	Riejanne Markus (NED)	Team Jumbo–Visma	+ 18 min 27 s
13	Yara Kastelijn (NED)	Plantur–Pura	+ 19 min 53 s
14	Shirin van Anrooij (NED)	Trek–Segafredo	+ 25 min 50 s
15	Tamara Dronova	Roland Cogeas Edelweiss Squad	+ 28 min 51 s
16	Liane Lippert (GER)	Team DSM	+ 29 min 49 s
17	Mie Bjørndal Ottestad (NOR)	Uno-X Pro Cycling Team	+ 29 min 50 s
18	Erica Magnaldi (ITA)	UAE Team ADQ	+ 30 min 15 s
19	Alena Amialiusik	Canyon//SRAM	+ 30 min 51 s
20	Grace Brown (AUS)	FDJ Suez Futuroscope	+ 31 min 01 s
21	Mischa Bredewold (NED)	Parkhotel Valkenburg	+ 31 min 31 s
22	Pauliena Rooijakkers (NED)	Canyon//SRAM	+ 35 min 08 s
23	Paula Patiño (COL)	Movistar Team	+ 35 min 19 s
24	Coralie Demay (FRA)	St. Michel–Auber93	+ 35 min 31 s
25	Nina Buijsman (NED)	Human Powered Health	+ 36 min 00 s
26	Marianne Vos (NED)	Team Jumbo–Visma	+ 36 min 56 s
27	Arlenis Sierra (CUB)	Movistar Team	+ 40 min 45 s
28	Rachel Neylan (AUS)	Cofidis	+ 40 min 59 s
29	Urška Žigart (SLO)	Team BikeExchange–Jayco	+ 41 min 11 s
30	Ellen van Dijk (NED)	Trek–Segafredo	+ 41 min 37 s
31	Jeanne Korevaar (NED)	Liv Racing Xstra	+ 42 min 14 s
32	Julia Borgström (SWE)	AG Insurance–NXTG	+ 42 min 33 s
33	Karlijn Swinkels (NED)	Team Jumbo–Visma	+ 42 min 44 s
34	Krista Doebel-Hickok (USA)	EF Education–Tibco–SVB	+ 43 min 45 s
35	Romy Kasper (GER)	Team Jumbo–Visma	+ 45 min 46 s
36	Lizzie Holden (GBR)	Le Col–Wahoo	+ 47 min 05 s
37	Elisa Balsamo (ITA)	Trek–Segafredo	+ 48 min 41 s
38	Lotte Kopecky (BEL)	SD Worx	+ 49 min 30 s
39	Vittoria Guazzini (ITA)	FDJ Suez Futuroscope	+ 49 min 38 s
40	Kristen Faulkner (USA)	Team BikeExchange–Jayco	+ 50 min 10 s
41	Alexandra Manly (AUS)	Team BikeExchange–Jayco	+ 50 min 34 s
42	Ruby Roseman-Gannon (AUS)	Team BikeExchange–Jayco	+ 51 min 24 s
43	Marie Le Net (FRA)	FDJ Suez Futuroscope	+ 53 min 25 s
44	Sandra Alonso (ESP)	Ceratizit–WNT Pro Cycling	+ 53 min 27 s
45	Morgane Coston (FRA)	Arkéa Pro Cycling Team	+ 53 min 54 s
46	Julie De Wilde (BEL)	Plantur–Pura	+ 54 min 04 s
47	Joss Lowden (GBR)	Uno-X Pro Cycling Team	+ 54 min 59 s
48	Valerie Demey (BEL)	Liv Racing Xstra	+ 55 min 56 s
49	Chantal van den Broek-Blaak (NED)	SD Worx	+ 57 min 17 s
50	Pfeiffer Georgi (GBR)	Team DSM	+ 57 min 44 s
51	Séverine Eraud (FRA)	Stade Rochelais Charente-Maritime	+ 58 min 06 s
52	Eva van Agt (NED)	Le Col–Wahoo	+ 58 min 08 s
53	Leah Thomas (USA)	Trek–Segafredo	+ 58 min 29 s
54	Maaike Boogaard (NED)	UAE Team ADQ	+ 58 min 33 s
55	Greta Richioud (FRA)	Arkéa Pro Cycling Team	+ 58 min 48 s
56	Quinty Schoens (NED)	Parkhotel Valkenburg	+ 58 min 55 s
57	Laura Asencio (FRA)	Ceratizit–WNT Pro Cycling	+ 1 h 00 min 49 s
58	Lisa Brennauer (GER)	Ceratizit–WNT Pro Cycling	+ 1 h 01 min 01 s
59	Henrietta Christie (NZL)	Human Powered Health	+ 1 h 01 min 04 s
60	Ane Santesteban (ESP)	Team BikeExchange–Jayco	+ 1 h 01 min 30 s
61	Marta Bastianelli (ITA)	UAE Team ADQ	+ 1 h 01 min 54 s
62	Sanne Cant (BEL)	Plantur–Pura	+ 1 h 02 min 20 s
63	Marit Raaijmakers (NED)	Human Powered Health	+ 1 h 02 min 56 s
64	Alice Maria Arzuffi (ITA)	Valcar–Travel & Service	+ 1 h 02 min 59 s
65	Kathrin Hammes (GER)	EF Education–Tibco–SVB	+ 1 h 03 min 13 s
66	Magdeleine Vallieres (CAN)	EF Education–Tibco–SVB	+ 1 h 04 min 19 s
67	Tiffany Cromwell (AUS)	Canyon//SRAM	+ 1 h 04 min 31 s
68	Victoire Berteau (FRA)	Cofidis	+ 1 h 04 min 44 s
69	Thalita de Jong (NED)	Liv Racing Xstra	+ 1 h 04 min 55 s
70	Antri Christoforou (CYP)	Human Powered Health	+ 1 h 05 min 54 s
71	Simone Boilard (CAN)	St. Michel–Auber93	+ 1 h 06 min 41 s
72	Christine Majerus (LUX)	SD Worx	+ 1 h 07 min 39 s
73	Femke Markus (NED)	Parkhotel Valkenburg	+ 1 h 08 min 44 s
74	Femke Gerritse (NED)	Parkhotel Valkenburg	+ 1 h 09 min 23 s
75	Maria Giulia Confalonieri (ITA)	Ceratizit–WNT Pro Cycling	+ 1 h 09 min 49 s
76	Amandine Fouquenet (FRA)	Arkéa Pro Cycling Team	+ 1 h 10 min 52 s
77	Soraya Paladin (ITA)	Canyon//SRAM	+ 1 h 11 min 06 s
78	Audrey Cordon-Ragot (FRA)	Trek–Segafredo	+ 1 h 11 min 33 s
79	Silke Smulders (NED)	Liv Racing Xstra	+ 1 h 12 min 06 s
80	Christina Schweinberger (AUT)	Plantur–Pura	+ 1 h 12 min 43 s
81	Julie Leth (DEN)	Uno-X Pro Cycling Team	+ 1 h 13 min 01 s
82	Margot Pompanon (FRA)	St. Michel–Auber93	+ 1 h 13 min 10 s
83	Jesse Vandenbulcke (BEL)	Le Col–Wahoo	+ 1 h 14 min 32 s
84	Maike van der Duin (NED)	Le Col–Wahoo	+ 1 h 16 min 02 s
85	Barbara Fonseca (FRA)	St. Michel–Auber93	+ 1 h 16 min 05 s
86	Sabrina Stultiens (NED)	Liv Racing Xstra	+ 1 h 17 min 10 s
87	Sandrine Bideau (FRA)	St. Michel–Auber93	+ 1 h 17 min 38 s
88	Valentine Fortin (FRA)	Cofidis	+ 1 h 19 min 05 s
89	Sandra Levenez (FRA)	Cofidis	+ 1 h 20 min 12 s
90	Ilaria Sanguineti (ITA)	Valcar–Travel & Service	+ 1 h 20 min 31 s
91	Anne Dorthe Ysland (NOR)	Uno-X Pro Cycling Team	+ 1 h 21 min 23 s
92	Caroline Baur (SUI)	Roland Cogeas Edelweiss Squad	+ 1 h 21 min 34 s
93	Ilse Pluimers (NED)	AG Insurance–NXTG	+ 1 h 22 min 44 s
94	Aude Biannic (FRA)	Movistar Team	+ 1 h 23 min 00 s
95	Pauline Allin (FRA)	Arkéa Pro Cycling Team	+ 1 h 25 min 25 s
96	Sheyla Gutiérrez (ESP)	Movistar Team	+ 1 h 26 min 44 s
97	Olga Zabelinskaya (UZB)	Roland Cogeas Edelweiss Squad	+ 1 h 27 min 01 s
98	Lily Williams (USA)	Human Powered Health	+ 1 h 29 min 07 s
99	Kathrin Schweinberger (AUT)	Ceratizit–WNT Pro Cycling	+ 1 h 29 min 51 s
100	Hannah Barnes (GBR)	Uno-X Pro Cycling Team	+ 1 h 31 min 21 s
101	Rotem Gafinovitz (ISR)	Roland Cogeas Edelweiss Squad	+ 1 h 32 min 50 s
102	Lone Meertens (BEL)	AG Insurance–NXTG	+ 1 h 33 min 18 s
103	Eugenia Bujak (SLO)	UAE Team ADQ	+ 1 h 34 min 06 s
104	Olivia Baril (CAN)	Valcar–Travel & Service	+ 1 h 34 min 22 s
105	Noemi Rüegg (SUI)	Team Jumbo–Visma	+ 1 h 35 min 37 s
106	Hannah Ludwig (GER)	Uno-X Pro Cycling Team	+ 1 h 38 min 41 s
107	Anya Louw (AUS)	AG Insurance–NXTG	+ 1 h 42 min 00 s
108	Alison Avoine (FRA)	St. Michel–Auber93	+ 1 h 44 min 29 s
109	Kim de Baat (BEL)	Plantur–Pura	+ 1 h 54 min 06 s

=== Points classification ===
Final points classification (1–10)
Rank	Rider	Team	Points
1	Marianne Vos (NED)	Team Jumbo–Visma	272
2	Lotte Kopecky (BEL)	SD Worx	174
3	Maria Giulia Confalonieri (ITA)	Ceratizit–WNT Pro Cycling	127
4	Silvia Persico (ITA)	Valcar–Travel & Service	106
5	Demi Vollering (NED)	SD Worx	104
6	Elisa Longo Borghini (ITA)	Trek–Segafredo	104
7	Katarzyna Niewiadoma (POL)	Canyon//SRAM	97
8	Elisa Balsamo (ITA)	Trek–Segafredo	85
9	Cecilie Uttrup Ludwig (DEN)	FDJ Suez Futuroscope	77
10	Annemiek van Vleuten (NED)	Movistar Team	76

=== Mountains classification ===
Final mountains classification (1–10)
Rank	Rider	Team	Points
1	Demi Vollering (NED)	SD Worx	42
2	Annemiek van Vleuten (NED)	Movistar Team	38
3	Katarzyna Niewiadoma (POL)	Canyon//SRAM	15
4	Elisa Longo Borghini (ITA)	Trek–Segafredo	14
5	Mavi García (ESP)	UAE Team ADQ	11
6	Pauliena Rooijakkers (NED)	Canyon//SRAM	11
7	Grace Brown (AUS)	FDJ Suez Futuroscope	10
8	Femke Gerritse (NED)	Parkhotel Valkenburg	9
9	Silvia Persico (ITA)	Valcar–Travel & Service	8
10	Juliette Labous (FRA)	Team DSM	6

=== Young rider classification ===
Final young rider classification (1–10)
Rank	Rider	Team	Time
1	Shirin van Anrooij (NED)	Trek–Segafredo	27 h 21 min 34 s
2	Mischa Bredewold (NED)	Parkhotel Valkenburg	+ 5 min 41 s
3	Julia Borgström (SWE)	AG Insurance–NXTG	+ 16 min 43 s
4	Vittoria Guazzini (ITA)	FDJ Suez Futuroscope	+ 23 min 48 s
5	Marie Le Net (FRA)	FDJ Suez Futuroscope	+ 27 min 35 s
6	Julie De Wilde (BEL)	Plantur–Pura	+ 28 min 14 s
7	Pfeiffer Georgi (GBR)	Team DSM	+ 31 min 54 s
8	Henrietta Christie (NZL)	Human Powered Health	+ 35 min 14 s
9	Magdeleine Vallieres (CAN)	EF Education–Tibco–SVB	+ 38 min 29 s
10	Victoire Berteau (FRA)	Cofidis	+ 38 min 54 s

=== Team classification ===
Final team classification (1–10)
Rank	Team	Time
1	Canyon//SRAM	81 h 27 min 09 s
2	FDJ Suez Futuroscope	+ 14 min 19 s
3	Trek–Segafredo	+ 24 min 34 s
4	SD Worx	+ 32 min 09 s
5	Movistar Team	+ 33 min 24 s
6	Team BikeExchange–Jayco	+ 52 min 32 s
7	Team DSM	+ 54 min 59 s
8	Team Jumbo–Visma	+ 58 min 00 s
9	UAE Team ADQ	+ 1 h 00 min 59 s
10	EF Education–Tibco–SVB	+ 1 h 15 min 37 s

== Reception ==
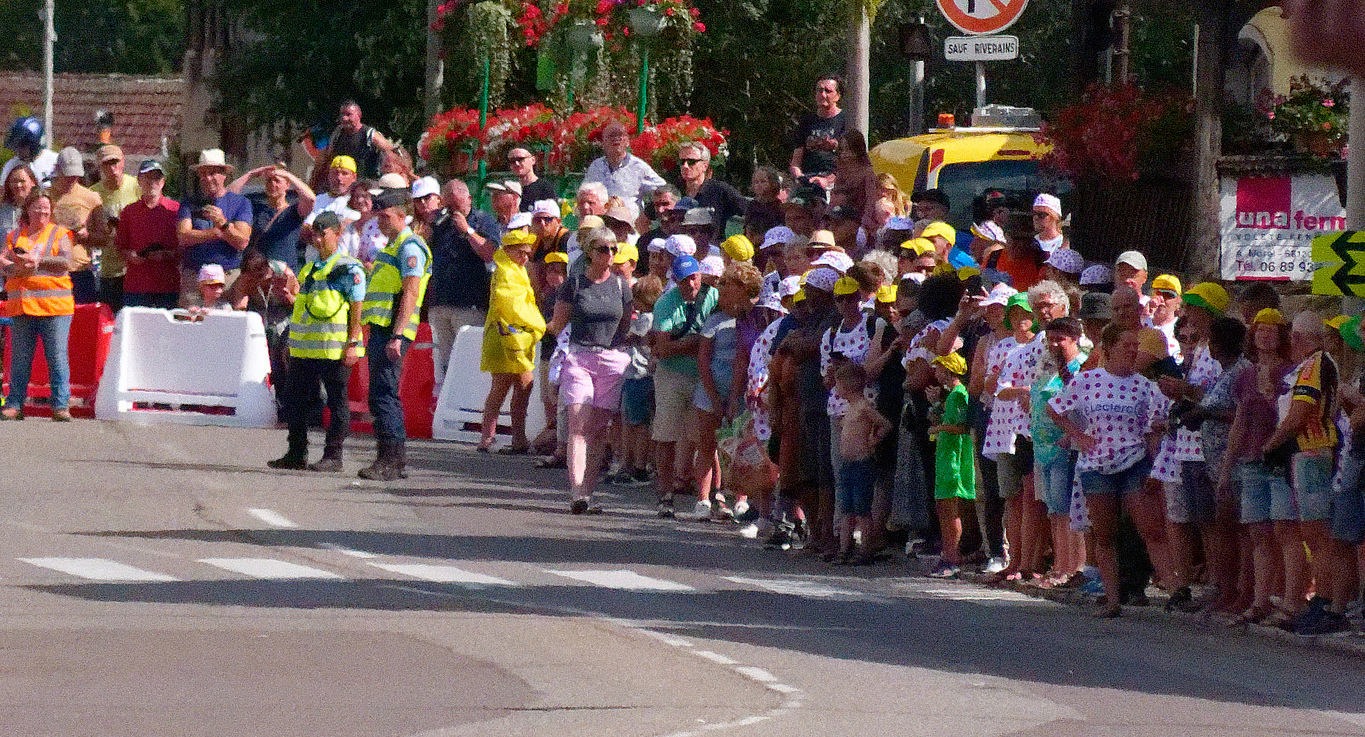
Large crowds greeted the Tour.

Worldwide media coverage praised the event. CNN called the race a "rebirth", Cycling Weekly commented that the race was a "huge step for the women's sport", and L'Équipe said that people came to see "the Tour de France without making the slightest distinction between men and women". Race director Marion Rousse stated that "it's a proper Tour de France, with the caravan, the crowds, placards, flags" and Le Tour Entier co-founder Kathryn Bertine called it a "wonderful edition".

Future improvements to the race were also discussed, including increasing the riders in each team, more days of racing (including an individual time trial and stages in the Alps or Pyrenees mountains), and increased sponsorship. It was also noted that work was still required to improve the competitive depth and "economic model" of the women's peloton, with L'Équipe referencing the "enormous difference in level between the ... runners-up and the rest of the peloton". The 2023 edition of the race subsequently featured both an individual time trial and mountain stages in the Pyrenees, and the 2024 edition visited the Alps.

== Broadcasting ==
Live television coverage was provided by France Télévisions in conjunction with the European Broadcasting Union. There were over 22 hours of live coverage over the eight stages, with some viewers requesting that live TV coverage be expanded to encompass the entire length of the stage. The race was broadcast around the world, including on NBC's Peacock in the United States, on Eurosport across Europe and by a variety of national broadcasters such as France 3, RTVE, and SBS.

Following the event, broadcasters reported high viewing figures, with a cumulative live audience of 23.2 million. In France, France 3 reported an average of 2.25 million viewers over the eight stages (a 26% audience share), and a peak of 5.1 million watching the final part of stage 8 (a 45% audience share). This was just under half the audience of the 2022 men's tour. In the Netherlands, a 45% audience share was reported at peak times. Eurosport reported a reach of over 14 million across Europe. France Télévisions commented that the audience figures were a good surprise, and that they were "a very solid basis on which the world of cycling will be able to build".
