= 2024 Classic Brugge–De Panne Women =

Cycling race

2024 Classic Brugge–De Panne
2024 UCI Women's World Tour, race 8 of 27
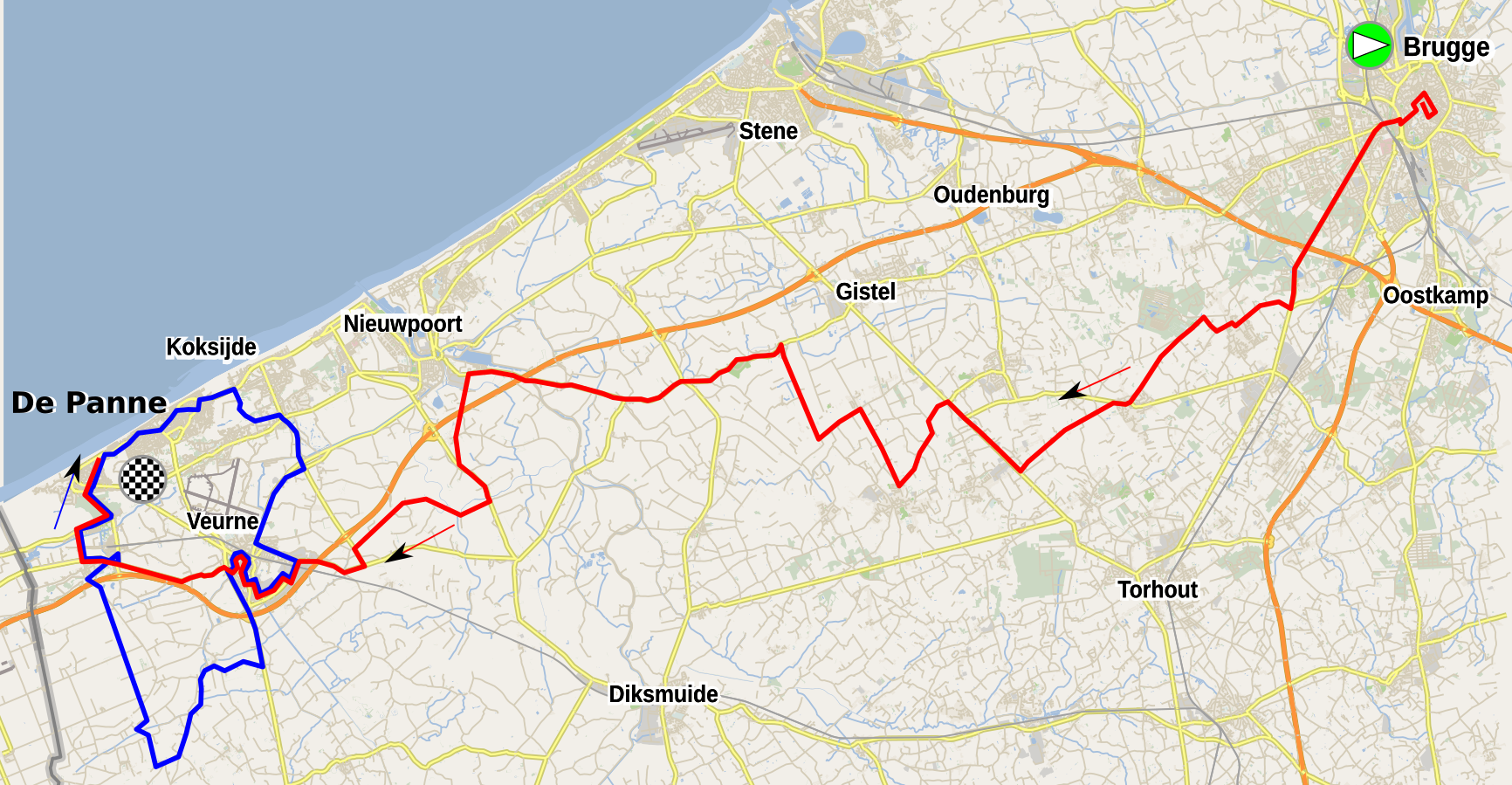

Race details
- Dates: 21 March 2024
- Stages: 1
- Distance: 155 km (96 mi)
- Winning time: 3h 49' 56"

Results
	Winner	Elisa Balsamo (ITA)	(Lidl–Trek)
	Second	Charlotte Kool (NED)	(Team dsm–firmenich PostNL)
	Third	Daria Pikulik (POL)	(Human Powered Health)

The 2024 Classic Brugge–De Panne was a Belgian road cycling one-day race that took place on 21 March. It was the 7th edition of Classic Brugge–De Panne and the 8th event of the 2024 UCI Women's World Tour. The race was won by Italian rider Elisa Balsamo of Lidl–Trek.

== Teams ==
Twenty teams took part in the event, including fourteen UCI Women's WorldTeams and six Women's continental teams.

UCI Women's WorldTeams

- AG Insurance–Soudal
- Canyon//SRAM
- Ceratizit–WNT Pro Cycling
- FDJ–Suez
- Fenix–Deceuninck
- Human Powered Health
- Lidl–Trek
- Liv AlUla Jayco
- Movistar Team
- Roland
- Team dsm–firmenich PostNL
- UAE Team ADQ
- Uno-X Mobility
- Visma–Lease a Bike

UCI Women's Continental Teams

- Chevalmeire
- Doltcini O'Shea
- EF Education–Cannondale
- Lotto–Dstny Ladies
- Proximus-Cyclis CT
- VolkerWessels Women Cyclingteam

== Result ==
Result
Rank	Rider	Team	Time
1	Elisa Balsamo (ITA)	Lidl–Trek	3h 49' 56"
2	Charlotte Kool (NED)	Team dsm–firmenich PostNL	+ 0"
3	Daria Pikulik (POL)	Human Powered Health	+ 0"
4	Chiara Consonni (ITA)	UAE Team ADQ	+ 0"
5	Georgia Baker (AUS)	Liv AlUla Jayco	+ 0"
6	Chloé Dygert (USA)	Canyon//SRAM	+ 0"
7	Emma Norsgaard (DEN)	Movistar Team	+ 0"
8	Anniina Ahtosalo (FIN)	Uno-X Mobility	+ 0"
9	Kimberley Le Court (MRI)	AG Insurance–Soudal	+ 0"
10	Vittoria Guazzini (ITA)	FDJ–Suez	+ 0"
