= 2025 Trofeo Alfredo Binda-Comune di Cittiglio =

Cycling race

2025 Trofeo Alfredo Binda - Comune di Cittiglio
2025 UCI Women's World Tour, race 6 of 27

Race details
- Dates: 16 March 2025
- Stages: 1
- Distance: 152 km (94 mi)
- Winning time: 4h 00' 19"

Results
	Winner	Elisa Balsamo (ITA)	(Lidl–Trek)
	Second	Blanka Vas (HUN)	(Team SD Worx–Protime)
	Third	Cat Ferguson (GBR)	(Movistar Team)

The 2025 Trofeo Alfredo Binda - Comune di Cittiglio (officially Trofeo Alfredo Binda - Comune di Cittiglio - Gran Premio Almar) was an Italian road cycling one-day race that took place on 16 March. It was the 49th edition of Trofeo Alfredo Binda and the 6th event of the 2025 UCI Women's World Tour. The race was won by Italian rider Elisa Balsamo of Lidl–Trek for the third time.

== Route ==
The race took place on a 152.0-kilometre (94.4 mi) course. The route started in Luino on the eastern edge of Lake Maggiore and initially followed the shoreline towards Porto Valtravaglia before turning back towards Germignaga. The riders then headed inland, climbing the Masciago Primo (the highest point of the race) before entering the Cittiglio finishing circuit. Six laps of the 18.4-kilometre (11.4 mi) circuit took place, with climbs of Casalzuigno (800 m at 6.9%) and Orino (2.5 km at 5%) returning from the previous edition.

== Teams ==
Twenty-four teams took part in the event, including fifteen UCI Women's WorldTeams, three UCI Women's ProTeams and six women's continental teams.

UCI Women's WorldTeams

- AG Insurance–Soudal
- Canyon//SRAM zondacrypto
- Ceratizit Pro Cycling
- FDJ–Suez
- Fenix–Deceuninck
- Human Powered Health
- Lidl–Trek
- Liv AlUla Jayco
- Movistar Team
- Roland
- Team SD Worx–Protime
- Team Picnic–PostNL
- UAE Team ADQ
- Uno-X Mobility
- Visma–Lease a Bike

UCI Women's ProTeams

- Cofidis
- EF Education–Oatly
- Laboral Kutxa–Fundación Euskadi

UCI Women's Continental Teams

- Aromitalia 3T Vaiano
- BePink–Imatra–Bongioanni
- BTC City Ljubljana Zhiraf Ambedo
- Isolmant–Premac–Vittoria
- Team Mendelspeck E-Work
- Top Girls Fassa Bortolo

== Result ==
Result
Rank	Rider	Team	Time
1	Elisa Balsamo (ITA)	Lidl–Trek	4h 00' 19"
2	Blanka Vas (HUN)	Team SD Worx–Protime	+ 0"
3	Cat Ferguson (GBR)	Movistar Team	+ 0"
4	Marianne Vos (NED)	Visma–Lease a Bike	+ 0"
5	Letizia Paternoster (ITA)	Liv AlUla Jayco	+ 0"
6	Noemi Rüegg (SUI)	EF Education–Oatly	+ 0"
7	Puck Pieterse (NED)	Fenix–Deceuninck	+ 0"
8	Monica Trinca Colonel (ITA)	Liv AlUla Jayco	+ 0"
9	Kimberley Le Court (MUS)	AG Insurance–Soudal	+ 0"
10	Elisa Longo Borghini (ITA)	UAE Team Emirates XRG	+ 0"
