= 2024 Omloop Het Nieuwsblad (women's race) =

Bicycle race

2024 UCI Women's World Tour, race 4 of 27
- Event poster with previous winners Lotte Kopecky and Dylan van Baarle

Race details
- Dates: 24 February 2024
- Stages: 1
- Distance: 127.1 km (79.0 mi)
- Winning time: 3h 27' 15"

Results
	Winner	Marianne Vos (NED)	(Visma–Lease a Bike)
	Second	Lotte Kopecky (BEL)	(Team SD Worx–Protime)
	Third	Elisa Longo Borghini (ITA)	(Lidl–Trek)

The 2024 Omloop Het Nieuwsblad was the 19th edition of the women's Omloop Het Nieuwsblad road cycling one-day race which took place on 24 February, starting in Ghent and finishing in Ninove. It was the fourth event of the 2024 UCI Women's World Tour.

The race was won by Dutch rider Marianne Vos of Visma–Lease a Bike in a sprint finish. Second-placed finisher Lotte Kopecky of Team SD Worx–Protime took the lead in the UCI Women's World Tour standings.

Final part of the 2024 Omloop Het Nieuwsblad for women

== Teams ==
Twenty-four teams took part in the event, including thirteen UCI Women's WorldTeams and eleven Women's continental teams.

UCI Women's WorldTeams

- AG Insurance–Soudal
- Canyon//SRAM
- FDJ–Suez
- Fenix–Deceuninck
- Human Powered Health
- Lidl–Trek
- Liv AlUla Jayco
- Movistar Team
- Team dsm–firmenich PostNL
- Team SD Worx–Protime
- Visma–Lease a Bike
- UAE Team ADQ
- Uno-X Mobility

UCI Women's Continental Teams

- Arkéa–B&B Hotels Women
- Bepink–Bongioanni
- Chevalmeire
- Cofidis
- EF Education–Cannondale
- Hess Cycling Team
- Lotto–Dstny Ladies
- Proximus-Cyclis CT
- Team Coop–Repsol
- Team Komugi–Grand Est
- VolkerWessels Women Cyclingteam

== Result ==
Final general classification
Rank	Rider	Team	Time
1	Marianne Vos (NED)	Visma–Lease a Bike	3h 27' 15"
2	Lotte Kopecky (BEL)	Team SD Worx–Protime	+ 0"
3	Elisa Longo Borghini (ITA)	Lidl–Trek	+ 0"
4	Shirin van Anrooij (NED)	Lidl–Trek	+ 0"
5	Thalita de Jong (NED)	Lotto–Dstny Ladies	+ 1' 08"
6	Demi Vollering (NED)	Team SD Worx–Protime	+ 1' 08"
7	Katarzyna Niewiadoma (POL)	Canyon//SRAM	+ 1' 08"
8	Puck Pieterse (NED)	Fenix–Deceuninck	+ 1' 08"
9	Lorena Wiebes (NED)	Team SD Worx–Protime	+ 1' 53"
10	Elisa Balsamo (ITA)	Lidl–Trek	+ 2' 08"
