= 2024 Trofeo Alfredo Binda-Comune di Cittiglio =

Cycling race

2024 Trofeo Alfredo Binda - Comune di Cittiglio
2024 UCI Women's World Tour, race 7 of 27
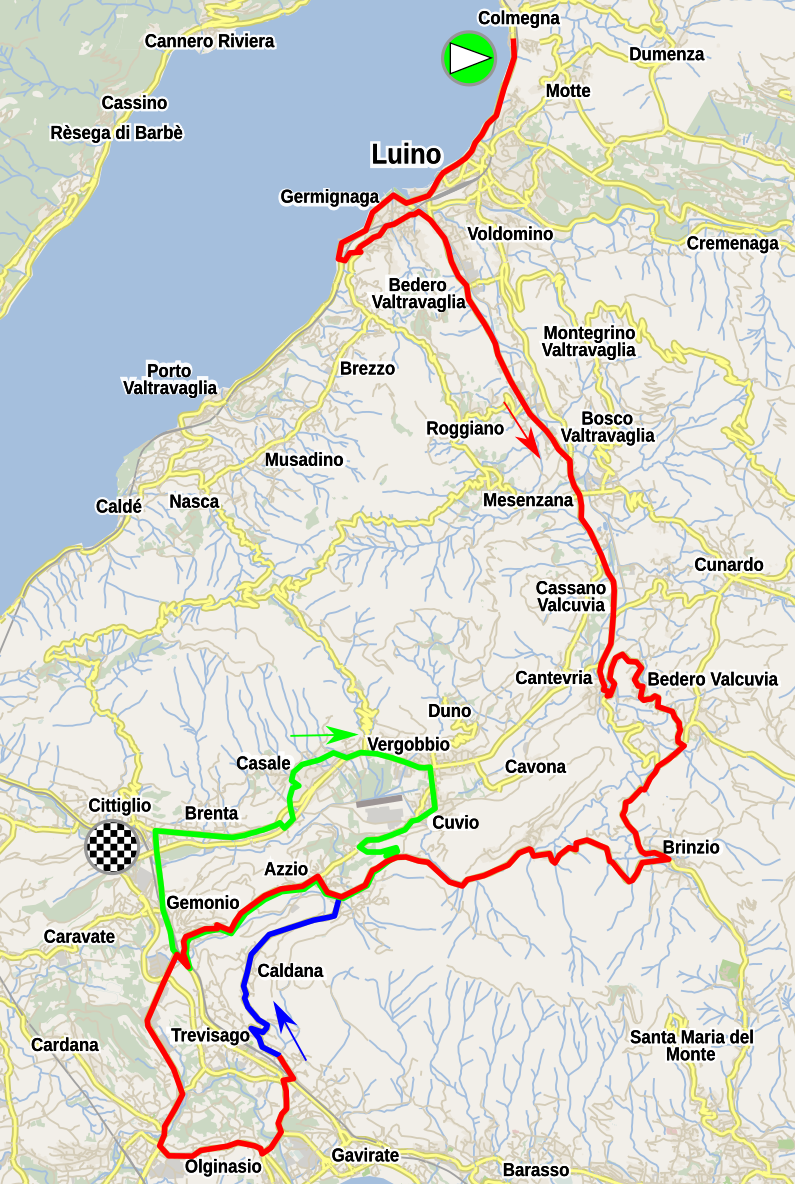

Race details
- Dates: 17 March 2024
- Stages: 1
- Distance: 140.5 km (87.3 mi)
- Winning time: 3h 40' 09"

Results
| | Winner | Elisa Balsamo (ITA) | (Lidl–Trek) |
| | Second | Lotte Kopecky (BEL) | (Team SD Worx–Protime) |
| | Third | Puck Pieterse (NED) | (Fenix–Deceuninck) |

The 2024 Trofeo Alfredo Binda - Comune di Cittiglio (officially Alfredo Binda - Comune di Cittiglio - Gran Premio Almar) was an Italian road cycling one-day race that took place on 17 March. It was the 48th edition of Trofeo Alfredo Binda and the 7th event of the 2024 UCI Women's World Tour.

The race was won by Italian rider Elisa Balsamo of Lidl–Trek for the second time.

== Route ==
The race took place on a 140.5 kilometres (87.3 mi) course. The route started at Maccagno con Pino e Veddasca on the shoreline of Lake Maggiore. The route then turned inland, climbing the Masciago Primo (5.1km at 4.6%) before entering the Cittiglio finishing circuit. Four laps of the 17.7 kilometres (11.0 mi) circuit would take place, with climbs of Casalzuigno (800m at 7%) and Orino (2.6km at 5%).

== Teams ==
Twenty-three teams took part in the event, including twelve UCI Women's WorldTeams and eleven Women's continental teams.

UCI Women's WorldTeams

- AG Insurance–Soudal
- Canyon//SRAM
- FDJ–Suez
- Fenix–Deceuninck
- Human Powered Health
- Lidl–Trek
- Liv AlUla Jayco
- Movistar Team
- Roland
- Team dsm–firmenich PostNL
- Team SD Worx–Protime
- UAE Team ADQ

UCI Women's Continental Teams

- Aromitalia 3T Vaiano
- A.S.D. K2 Women Team
- Bepink–Bongioanni
- BTC City Ljubljana Zhiraf Ambedo
- Cofidis
- EF Education–Cannondale
- Eneicat–CMTeam
- Isolmant–Premac–Vittoria
- Laboral Kutxa–Fundación Euskadi
- Team Mendelspeck Ge-Man
- Top Girls Fassa Bortolo

== Result ==
Result
| Rank | Rider | Team | Time |
|---|---|---|---|
| 1 | Elisa Balsamo (ITA) | Lidl–Trek | 3h 40' 09" |
| 2 | Lotte Kopecky (BEL) | Team SD Worx–Protime | + 1" |
| 3 | Puck Pieterse (NED) | Fenix–Deceuninck | + 1" |
| 4 | Soraya Paladin (ITA) | Canyon//SRAM | + 1" |
| 5 | Pfeiffer Georgi (GBR) | Team dsm–firmenich PostNL | + 1" |
| 6 | Karlijn Swinkels (NED) | UAE Team ADQ | + 1" |
| 7 | Olivia Baril (CAN) | Movistar Team | + 1" |
| 8 | Silvia Persico (ITA) | UAE Team ADQ | + 1" |
| 9 | Évita Muzic (FRA) | FDJ–Suez | + 1" |
| 10 | Niamh Fisher-Black (NZL) | Team SD Worx–Protime | + 1" |
