= 2023 Trofeo Alfredo Binda-Comune di Cittiglio =

2023 Alfredo Binda - Comune di Cittiglio - Gran Premio Almar
2023 UCI Women's World Tour, race 7 of 27
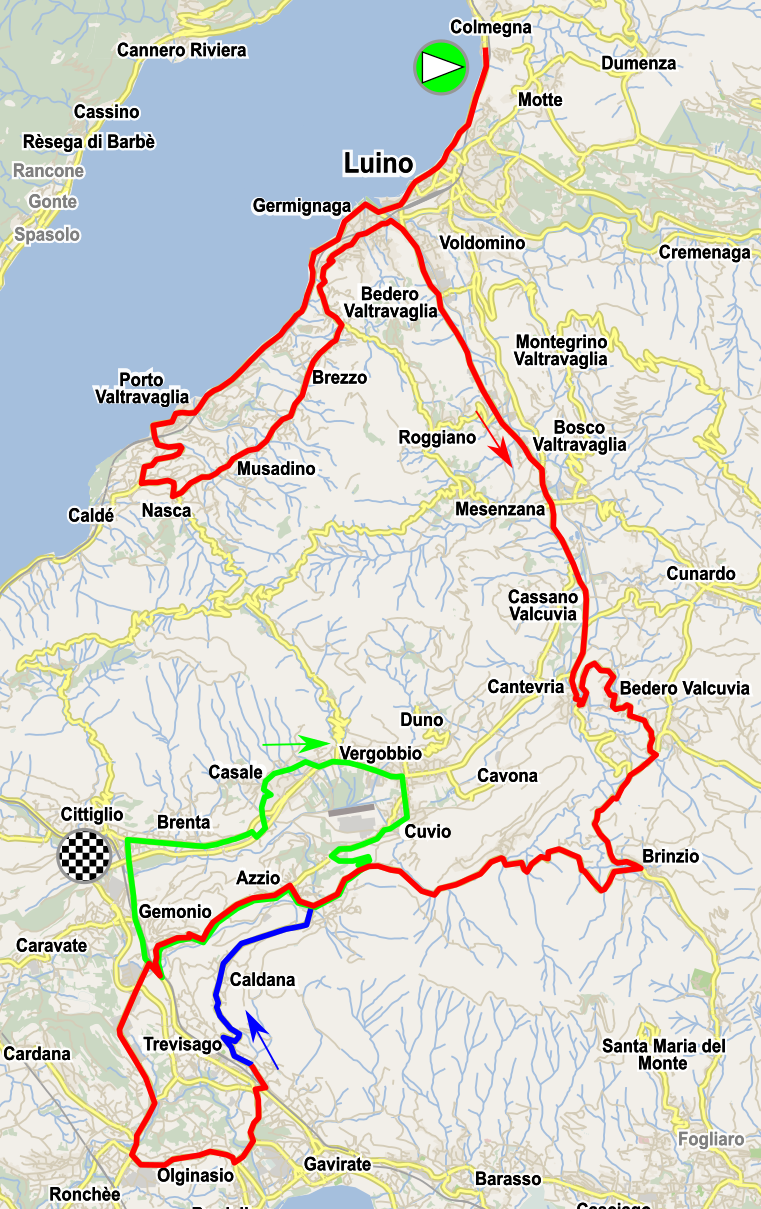

Race details
- Dates: 19 March 2023
- Stages: 1
- Distance: 139 km (86 mi)
- Winning time: 3h 39' 32"

Results
	Winner	Shirin Van Anrooij (NED)	(Trek–Segafredo)
	Second	Elisa Balsamo (ITA)	(Trek–Segafredo)
	Third	Vittoria Guazzini (ITA)	(FDJ–Suez)

The 2023 Trofeo Alfredo Binda - Comune di Cittiglio (officially Alfredo Binda - Comune di Cittiglio - Gran Premio Almar) was an Italian road cycling one-day race that took place on 19 March 2023. It was the 47th edition of Trofeo Alfredo Binda and the 7th event of the 2023 UCI Women's World Tour.

The race was won by Dutch rider Shirin Van Anrooij of Trek–Segafredo after a solo attack with 25 kilometres (16 mi) remaining.

== Route ==
The race took place on a 139 kilometres (86 mi) course. The route started at Maccagno con Pino e Veddasca on the shoreline of Lake Maggiore. The route then turned inland, climbing the Masciago Primo (5.1km at 4.6%) before entering the Cittiglio finishing circuit. Four laps of the 17.7 kilometres (11.0 mi) circuit would take place, with climbs of Casalzuigno (800m at 7%) and Orino (2.6km at 5%).

== Teams ==
24 teams took part in the race, made up of twelve UCI Women's WorldTeams and twelve UCI Women's Continental Teams, seven of which were Italian teams.

UCI Women's WorldTeams

- Canyon//SRAM
- FDJ–Suez
- Liv Racing TeqFind
- Movistar Team
- Israel Premier Tech Roland
- Team Jayco–AlUla
- Team DSM
- Team Jumbo–Visma
- SD Worx
- Trek–Segafredo
- UAE Team ADQ
- Fenix–Deceuninck

UCI Women's Continental Teams

- Ceratizit–WNT Pro Cycling
- AG Insurance–Soudal–Quick-Step
- Laboral Kutxa–Fundación Euskadi
- Massi–Tactic
- Bepink
- Born to Win G20 Ambedo
- Aromitalia–Basso Bikes–Vaiano
- GB Junior Team Piemonte Pedale Castanese A.S.D.
- Isolmant–Premac–Vittoria
- Zaaf Cycling Team
- Team Mendelspeck
- Top Girls Fassa Bortolo

== Summary ==
Two time winner of the event Elisa Longo Borghini missed the event after testing positive for COVID-19, with 2022 winner Elisa Balsamo of Trek–Segafredo tipped for victory.

In the first half of the race, no decisive breakaway escaped, with the peloton entering the finishing circuit with 70 kilometres remaining. On the second lap, a group of seven riders including four-time winner Marianne Vos of Team Jumbo–Visma and 2018 winner Katarzyna Niewiadoma of Canyon–SRAM escaped on the descent from the Casalzuigno climb, gaining around a 10 second lead. Led by Grace Brown of FDJ–Suez, the peloton quickly shut down the gap, reabsorbing the group.

During the Orino climb and the subsequent descent, a group of three riders slowly escaped the peloton, eventually gaining a lead of around a minute entering the penultimate lap. On the next ascent of the Orino climb, an attack led by Gaia Realini of Trek–Segafredo closed the gap. Her teammate Shirin van Anrooij then launched a solo attack at the top of the climb with around 25 kilometres (16 mi) remaining.

Starting the final lap, van Anrooij had a 11 second lead over a large chase group of 30 seconds behind. However, the chase group did not make ground on van Anrooij, as key contenders like Brown, Elise Chabbey of Canyon–SRAM and Mavi García of Movistar attempted attacks of their own from the chasing group. Vos faded away due to leg cramps on the final climb of Orino.

Over the top of the final ascent of Orino, van Anrooij had a lead of around 25 seconds, which she held to the finishing line in Cittiglio. It was van Anrooij's first major win on the road, after multiple major cyclo-cross wins. In a sprint finish for second place, Balsamo made it a 1-2 finish for Trek–Segafredo, beating Vittoria Guazzini of FDJ–Suez for third place. Lorena Wiebes maintained her leaders jersey of the UCI Women's World Tour.

== Result ==
Result
Rank	Rider	Team	Time
1	Shirin Van Anrooij (NED)	Trek–Segafredo	3h 39' 32"
2	Elisa Balsamo (ITA)	Trek–Segafredo	+ 23"
3	Vittoria Guazzini (ITA)	FDJ–Suez	+ 23"
4	Arlenis Sierra (CUB)	Movistar Team	+ 23"
5	Soraya Paladin (ITA)	Canyon//SRAM	+ 23"
6	Silvia Persico (ITA)	UAE Team ADQ	+ 23"
7	Elise Uijen (NED)	Team DSM	+ 23"
8	Justine Ghekiere (BEL)	AG Insurance–Soudal–Quick-Step	+ 23"
9	Claire Steels (GBR)	Israel Premier Tech Roland	+ 23"
10	Mavi García (ESP)	Liv Racing TeqFind	+ 23"

== See also ==
- 2023 in women's road cycling
