= 2022 Classic Brugge–De Panne (women's race) =

2022 Exterioo Classic Brugge–De Panne
2022 UCI Women's World Tour, race 4 of 23

Race details
- Dates: 24 March 2022
- Stages: 1
- Distance: 162.8 km (101.2 mi)
- Winning time: 3h 52' 11"

Results
	Winner	Elisa Balsamo (ITA)	(Trek–Segafredo)
	Second	Lorena Wiebes (NED)	(Team DSM)
	Third	Marta Bastianelli (ITA)	(UAE Team ADQ)

The 2022 Exterioo Classic Brugge–De Panne was a Belgian road cycling one-day race that took place on 24 March 2022. It was the 5th edition of Classic Brugge–De Panne and the 4th event of the 2022 UCI Women's World Tour.

The race was won by Italian rider Elisa Balsamo of Trek–Segafredo in a sprint. For the first time, the women's race had the same prize money as the men's race - with a total prize of €40,000.

== Teams ==
Twelve UCI Women's WorldTeams (Team Jumbo Visma and EF Education–Tibco–SVB chose not to start this race) and eleven UCI Women's Continental Teams competed in the race.

UCI Women's WorldTeams

- Canyon//SRAM
- FDJ Nouvelle-Aquitaine Futuroscope
- Human Powered Health
- Liv Racing Xstra
- Movistar Team
- Roland Cogeas Edelweiss Squad
- Team BikeExchange–Jayco
- Team DSM
- SD Worx
- Trek–Segafredo
- UAE Team ADQ
- Uno-X Pro Cycling Team

UCI Women's Continental Teams

- Ceratizit–WNT Pro Cycling
- Parkhotel Valkenburg
- Valcar–Travel & Service
- Bingoal Casino–Chevalmeire–Van Eyck Sport
- IBCT
- Le Col–Wahoo
- Lotto–Soudal Ladies
- Multum Accountants Ladies
- AG Insurance–NXTG
- Plantur–Pura
- Team Coop–Hitec Products

== Results ==
Result
Rank	Rider	Team	Time
1	Elisa Balsamo (ITA)	Trek–Segafredo	3h 52' 11"
2	Lorena Wiebes (NED)	Team DSM	+ 0"
3	Marta Bastianelli (ITA)	UAE Team ADQ	+ 0"
4	Lonneke Uneken (NED)	SD Worx	+ 0"
5	Maria Martins (POR)	Le Col–Wahoo	+ 0"
6	Emma Norsgaard Jørgensen (DEN)	Movistar Team	+ 0"
7	Chiara Consonni (ITA)	Valcar–Travel & Service	+ 0"
8	Alice Barnes (GBR)	Canyon//SRAM	+ 0"
9	Lotte Kopecky (BEL)	SD Worx	+ 3"
10	Clara Copponi (FRA)	FDJ Nouvelle-Aquitaine Futuroscope	+ 3"
