= 2021 Omloop Het Nieuwsblad (women's race) =

2021 UCI Women's ProSeries, race 1 of 7

Race details
- Dates: 27 February 2021
- Stages: 1
- Distance: 124.4 km (77.3 mi)
- Winning time: 3h 21' 00"

Results
	Winner	Anna van der Breggen (NED)	(SD Worx)
	Second	Emma Norsgaard Jørgensen (DEN)	(Movistar Team)
	Third	Amy Pieters (NED)	(SD Worx)

The 2021 Omloop Het Nieuwsblad was the 16th edition of the women's Omloop Het Nieuwsblad road cycling one-day race which was held on 27 February. The race was a 1.Pro event on the women's international calendar, part of the UCI Women's ProSeries. The race followed a similar route to that of the men's race, but was shorter and more straightforward at only 124.4 kilometres (77.3 mi), starting in Ghent and finishing in Ninove. For the first time, the women's race finished an hour after the men's race, allowing for the final hour to be broadcast live on television.

The race was won by Dutch rider Anna van der Breggen of SD Worx for the second time.

== Teams ==
Twenty-four teams, made up of all nine UCI Women's WorldTeams and fifteen UCI Women's Continental Teams, participated in the race. Each team entered a squad of six riders for a total of 144 riders, of which 111 finished.

UCI Women's WorldTeams

- Alé BTC Ljubljana
- Canyon//SRAM
- FDJ Nouvelle-Aquitaine Futuroscope
- Liv Racing
- Movistar Team
- SD Worx
- Team BikeExchange
- Team DSM
- Trek–Segafredo

UCI Women's Continental Teams

- Arkéa Pro Cycling Team
- Bingoal Casino–Chevalmeire
- Burgos Alimenta Women Cycling Sport
- Ceratizit–WNT Pro Cycling
- Doltcini–Van Eyck–Proximus
- Drops–Le Col
- Lotto–Soudal Ladies
- Multum Accountants Ladies
- NXTG Racing
- Parkhotel Valkenburg
- Team Hitec Products
- Team Jumbo–Visma
- Team Rupelcleaning–Champion Lubricants
- Tibco–Silicon Valley Bank
- Valcar–Travel & Service

== Result ==
Final general classification
Rank	Rider	Team	Time
1	Anna van der Breggen (NED)	SD Worx	3h 21' 00"
2	Emma Norsgaard Jørgensen (DEN)	Movistar Team	+ 23"
3	Amy Pieters (NED)	SD Worx	+ 23"
4	Lotte Kopecky (BEL)	Liv Racing	+ 23"
5	Hannah Barnes (GBR)	Canyon//SRAM	+ 23"
6	Marta Bastianelli (ITA)	Alé BTC Ljubljana	+ 23"
7	Lisa Brennauer (GER)	Ceratizit–WNT Pro Cycling	+ 23"
8	Grace Brown (AUS)	Team BikeExchange	+ 23"
9	Marta Cavalli (ITA)	FDJ Nouvelle-Aquitaine Futuroscope	+ 23"
10	Elisa Longo Borghini (ITA)	Trek–Segafredo	+ 26"

== See also ==
- 2021 in women's road cycling
