= 2022 Trofeo Alfredo Binda-Comune di Cittiglio =

2022 UCI Women's World Tour, race 3 of 23
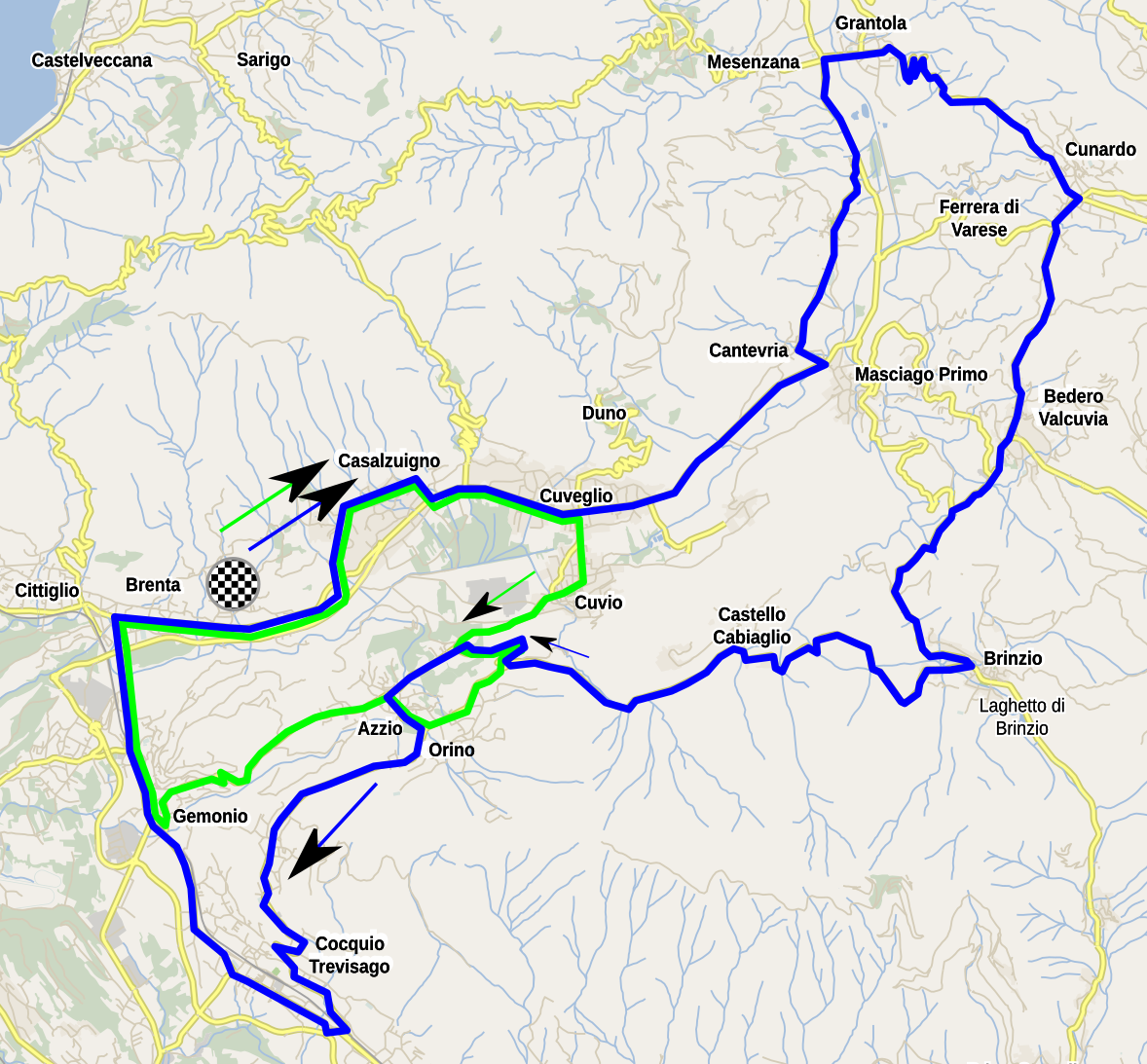

Race details
- Dates: 20 March 2022
- Stages: 1
- Distance: 141.8 km (88.1 mi)

Results
	Winner	Elisa Balsamo (ITA)	(Trek–Segafredo)
	Second	Sofia Bertizzolo (ITA)	(UAE Team ADQ)
	Third	Soraya Paladin (ITA)	(Canyon//SRAM)

The 2022 Trofeo Alfredo Binda-Comune di Cittiglio was an Italian road cycling one-day race that took place on 20 March. It was the 46th edition of Trofeo Alfredo Binda and the 3rd event of the 2022 UCI Women's World Tour. The race started in Cocquio-Trevisago and finished in Cittiglio, on the outskirts of Lago Maggiore in Northwest Italy. The race was won by the world champion Elisa Balsamo of Trek–Segafredo in a sprint finish.

== Teams ==
24 teams took part in the race. The Human Powered Health and Uno-X Pro Cycling WorldTeams did not participate in this race.

UCI Women's WorldTeams

- Canyon//SRAM
- EF Education–Tibco–SVB
- FDJ Nouvelle-Aquitaine Futuroscope
- Liv Racing Xstra
- Movistar Team
- Roland Cogeas Edelweiss Squad
- Team BikeExchange–Jayco
- Team DSM
- Team Jumbo–Visma
- SD Worx
- Trek–Segafredo
- UAE Team ADQ

UCI Women's Continental Teams

- Ceratizit–WNT Pro Cycling
- Parkhotel Valkenburg
- Valcar–Travel & Service
- Cofidis
- NXTG by Experza
- Aromitalia–Basso Bikes–Vaiano
- Bepink
- Born to Win G20 Ambedo
- Isolmant–Premac–Vittoria
- Servetto–Makhymo–Beltrami TSA
- Team Mendelspeck
- Top Girls Fassa Bortolo

== Result ==
Final general classification

Rank	Rider	Team	Time
1	Elisa Balsamo (ITA)	Trek–Segafredo	3h 36' 29"
2	Sofia Bertizzolo (ITA)	UAE Team ADQ	s.t.
3	Soraya Paladin (ITA)	Canyon//SRAM	s.t.
4	Chantal van den Broek-Blaak (NED)	SD Worx	s.t.
5	Elena Cecchini (ITA)	SD Worx	s.t.
6	Coryn Labecki (USA)	Team Jumbo–Visma	s.t.
7	Elise Chabbey (SUI)	Canyon//SRAM	s.t.
8	Silvia Persico (ITA)	Valcar–Travel & Service	s.t.
9	Cecilie Uttrup Ludwig (DEN)	FDJ Nouvelle-Aquitaine Futuroscope	s.t.
10	Ashleigh Moolman-Pasio (RSA)	SD Worx	s.t.

== See also ==
- 2022 in women's road cycling
