= Silvia Persico =

Italian cyclist (born 1997)

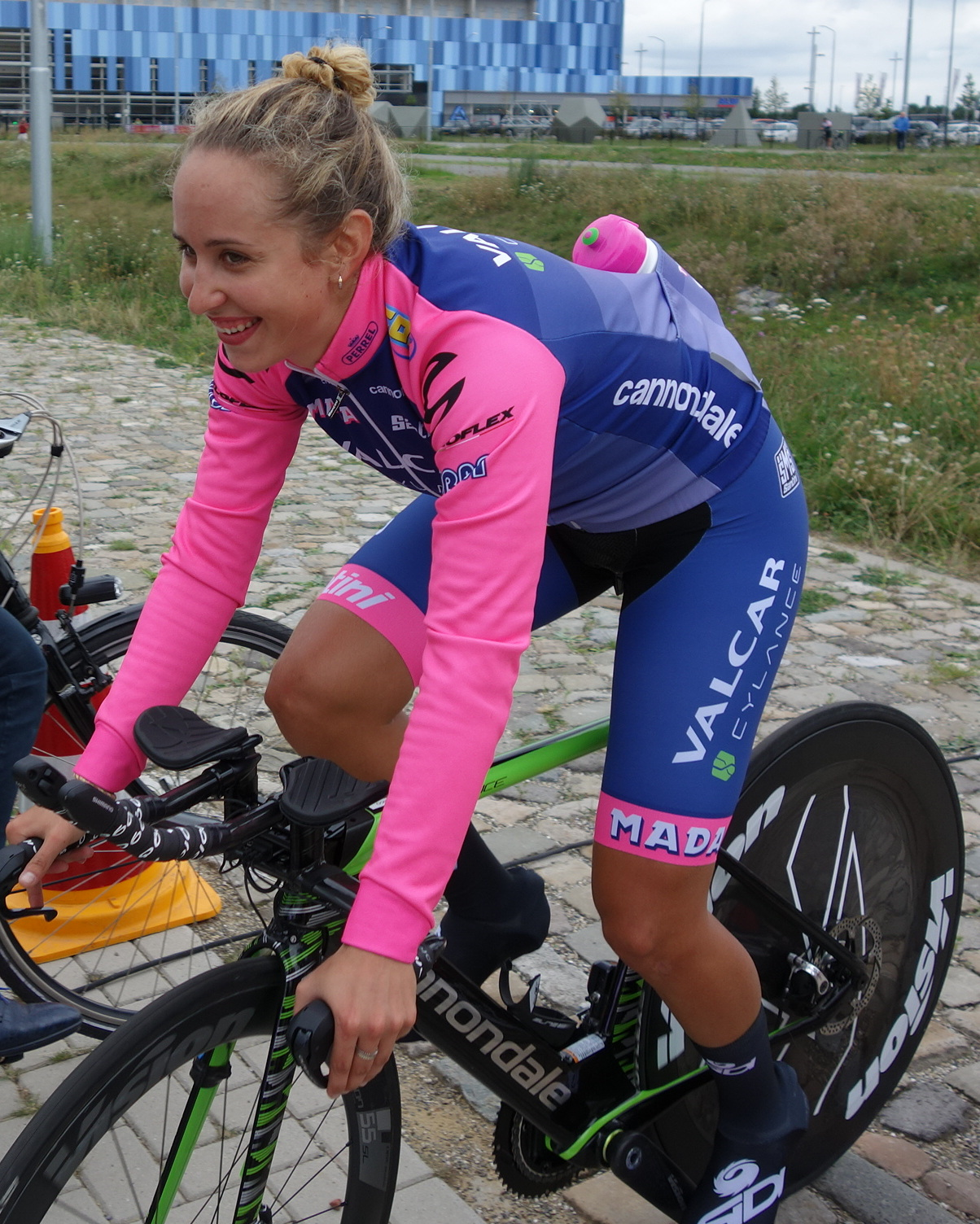
- Persico in 2019

Personal information
- Full name: Silvia Persico
- Born: 25 July 1997 (age 29) Alzano Lombardo, Italy
- Height: 1.64 m (5 ft 5 in)
- Weight: 53 kg (117 lb)

Cycling career
- Sport: Cycling
- Current team: UAE Team L'Imad
- Disciplines: Road; Cyclo-cross
- Role: Rider

Professional teams
- 2017–2022: Valcar–PBM
- 2023–: UAE Team ADQ

Major wins
- Cyclo-cross National Championships (2022, 2023) Road One-day races and Classics Brabantse Pijl (2023)
Medal record
Representing Italy
Women's Cyclo-cross
World Championships
Bronze medal – third place	2022 Fayetteville	Elite
Women's road cycling
World Championships
Bronze medal – third place	2022 Wollongong	Elite road race
Women's gravel bicycle racing
European Championships
Silver medal – second place	2024 Asiago	Elite

Silvia Persico (born 25 July 1997) is an Italian professional racing cyclist, who currently rides for UCI Women's WorldTeam UAE Team L'Imad.

== Major results ==
=== Cyclo-cross ===
2016–2017
2nd National Under-23 Championships
3rd Vittorio Veneto
2017–2018
3rd National Under-23 Championships
3rd Vittorio Veneto
3rd Gorizia
2018–2019
2nd National Under-23 Championships
3rd Vittorio Veneto
2019–2020
3rd Jesolo
2021–2022
1st National Championships
1st Cremona
2nd Fae' Di Oderzo
3rd UCI World Championships
3rd Jesolo
2022–2023
1st National Championships
Swiss Cup

1st Meilen

1st San Colombano Certenoli
1st Vittorio Veneto
1st Fae' Di Oderzo
1st Jesolo

=== Gravel ===
2023
2nd UCI World Championships
2024
2nd UEC European Championships
2025
3rd UCI World Championships

=== Road ===
2016
6th Gran Premio della Liberazione
2017
5th Gran Premio della Liberazione
7th Diamond Tour
8th Erondegemse Pijl
2018
5th Road race, National Championships
7th Diamond Tour
2019
4th Vuelta a la Comunitat Valenciana
2021
6th Diamond Tour
9th Vuelta a la Comunitat Valenciana
2022
1st Gran Premio della Liberazione
1st Memorial Monica Bandini
1st Stage 4 Ceratizit Challenge by La Vuelta
2nd Overall Kreiz Breizh Elites
3rd Overall Grand Prix Elsy Jacobs
3rd MerXem Classic
3rd Road race, UCI World Championships
5th Overall Tour de France
7th Brabantse Pijl
7th Overall Giro Donne
7th Overall Vuelta a Burgos
7th Overall RideLondon Classique
8th Trofeo Alfredo Binda
9th Gent–Wevelgem
10th Strade Bianche
2023
1st Brabantse Pijl
3rd Overall UAE Tour
4th Tour of Flanders
5th Road race, UEC European Championships
6th Trofeo Alfredo Binda
8th La Flèche Wallonne
9th Amstel Gold Race
9th Overall Vuelta a Burgos
2024
1st Grand Prix du Morbihan
2nd Gran Premio della Liberazione
2nd Tre Valli Varesine
5th Trofeo Palma
7th Tour of Flanders
8th Trofeo Oro in Euro
8th Trofeo Alfredo Binda
10th Trofeo Binissalem-Andratx
2025
2nd Overall UAE Tour
2nd Trofeo Binissalem-Andratx
3rd Trofeo Palma
5th Amstel Gold Race
2026
7th Tour of Flanders
