= Emma Norsgaard =

Danish cyclist (born 1999)

Emma Cecilie Norsgaard Bjerg
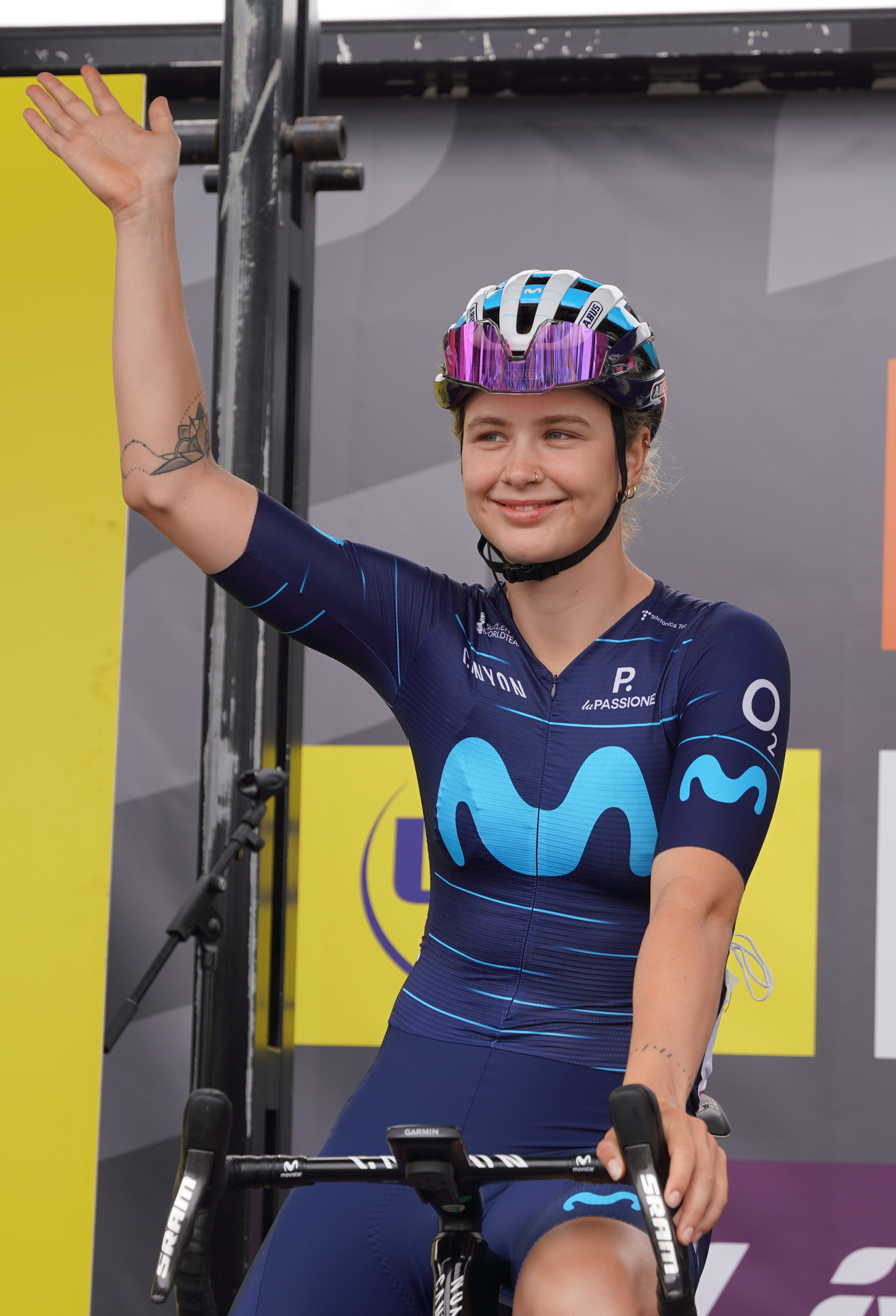
- Norsgaard at the 2022 Tour de France Femmes.

Personal information
- Full name: Emma Cecilie Norsgaard Bjerg
- Born: Emma Cecilie Norsgaard Jørgensen; 26 July 1999 (age 27) Silkeborg, Denmark
- Height: 1.72 m (5 ft 8 in)

Cycling career
- Sport: Cycling
- Current team: Lidl–Trek
- Disciplines: Road; Gravel
- Role: Rider
- Rider type: Sprinter; Time trialist

Amateur team
- 2016–2017: Team Rytger

Professional teams
- 2018–2020: Cervélo–Bigla Pro Cycling
- 2021–2024: Movistar Team
- 2025-: Lidl–Trek

Major wins
- Major Tours Tour de France 1 individual stage (2023) Giro Donne 1 individual stage (2021) One-day races and Classics National Road Race Championships (2016, 2020) National Time Trial Championships (2021, 2023, 2024)

Emma Cecilie Norsgaard Bjerg née Jørgensen (born 26 July 1999) is a Danish cyclist, who currently rides for UCI Women's WorldTeam Lidl-Trek. Her major victories include winning stage six of the 2021 Giro Rosa (now called the Giro Donne) and stage six of the 2023 Tour de France Femmes.

== Personal life ==
Her brother Mathias Norsgaard is also a professional cyclist, with the Movistar Team. Norsgaard married cyclist Mikkel Bjerg in 2021.

== Major results ==
2015
3rd Overall Rás na mBan

1st Young rider classification
1st Stage 2

2016
1st Road race, National Road Championships
6th Road race, UCI Junior Road World Championships
2017
1st Time trial, National Junior Road Championships
2nd Road race, UCI Junior Road World Championships
UEC European Junior Road Championships

2nd Road race
3rd Time trial

3rd Overall Energiewacht Tour Juniors
2018
2nd Road race, National Road Championships
2020
1st Road race, National Road Championships
1st Stage 1 Setmana Ciclista Valenciana
3rd Omloop van het Hageland
7th UCI Road World Championships – Women's time trial
2021
1st Time trial, National Road Championships
1st Overall Festival Elsy Jacobs

1st Points classification
1st Young rider classification
1st Stages 1 & 2

1st Stage 6 Giro Rosa
2nd Omloop Het Nieuwsblad
2nd Le Samyn
2nd Scheldeprijs
3rd Overall Healthy Ageing Tour

1st Young rider classification

3rd Overall Thüringen Ladies Tour

1st Young rider classification
1st Stage 1

6th Paris–Roubaix
8th Nokere Koerse
9th Gent–Wevelgem
2022
1st Le Samyn
2nd Omloop van het Hageland
5th Gent–Wevelgem
6th Omloop Het Nieuwsblad
6th Classic Brugge–De Panne
2023
1st Time trial, National Road Championships
1st National Gravel Championships
1st Stage 6 Tour de France
2nd Overall Baloise Ladies Tour
2nd Costa De Almería
4th Omloop Het Nieuwsblad
2024
National Road Championships

1st Time trial
3rd Road race

UCI Gravel World Series

1st Blaavands Huk

2nd La Picto–Charentaise
5th Omloop van het Hageland
7th Classic Brugge–De Panne
7th Nokere Koerse
