= Angelica Brogi =

Italian racing cyclist (born 1998)

Personal information
- Full name: Angelica Brogi
- Born: 20 October 1998 (age 27)

Cycling career
- Sport: Cycling
- Current team: BTC City Ljubljana Zhiraf Ambedo
- Discipline: Road
- Role: Rider

Amateur teams
- 2017: Still Bike Team
- 2017: Aromitalia Vaiano (stagiaire)

Professional teams
- 2018–2020: Aromitalia Vaiano
- 2021–: Born to Win G20 Ambedo

Angelica Brogi (born 20 October 1998) is an Italian professional racing cyclist, who currently rides for UCI Women's Continental Team BTC City Ljubljana Zhiraf Ambedo.
