= Elisa Balsamo (cyclist) =

2021 World Road Champion Italian road and track cyclist

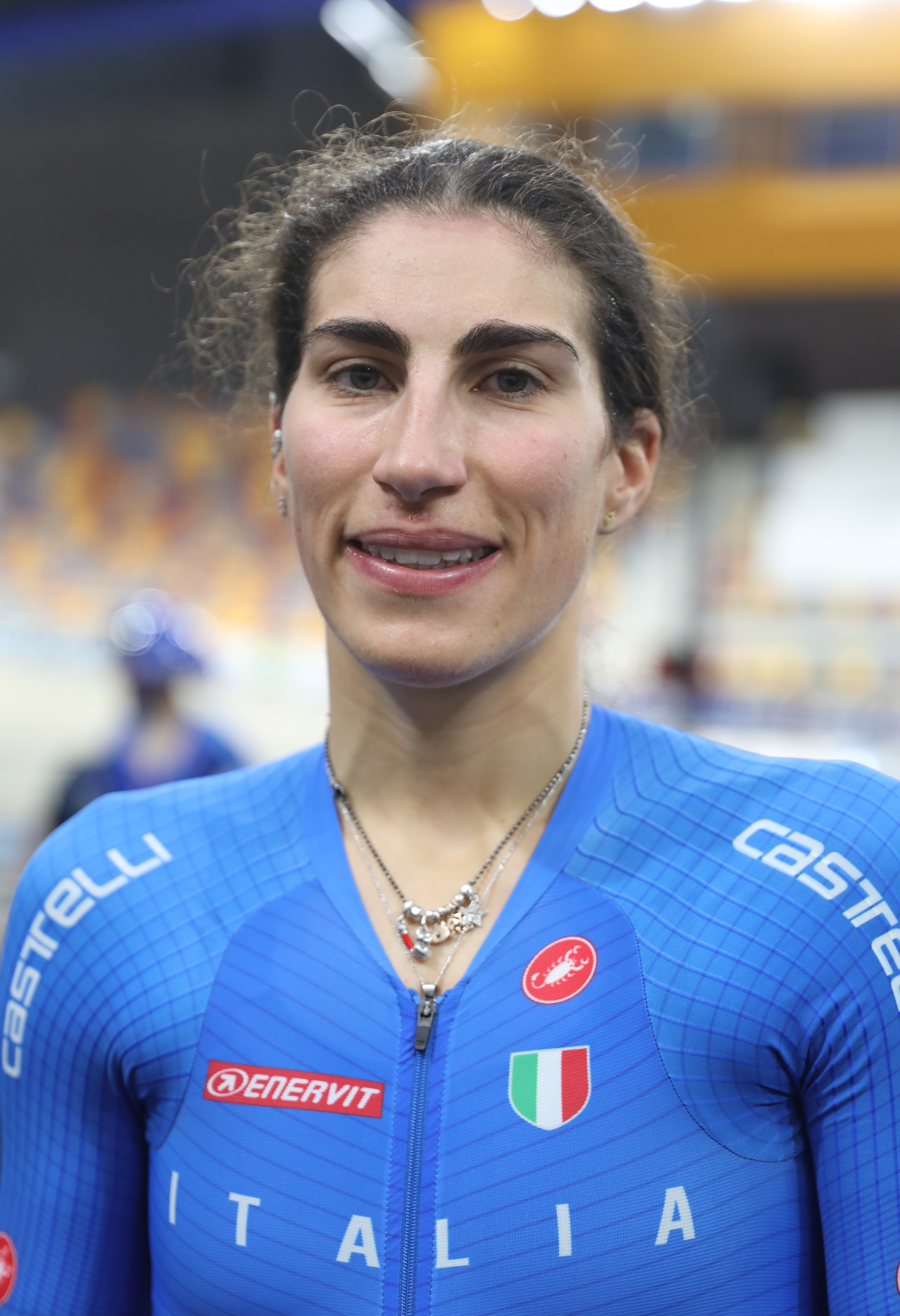
- Balsamo in 2024

Personal information
- Born: 27 February 1998 (age 28) Cuneo, Italy
- Height: 1.65 m (5 ft 5 in)
- Weight: 53 kg (117 lb)

Cycling career
- Sport: Cycling
- Current team: Lidl–Trek
- Disciplines: Road; Track
- Role: Rider
- Rider type: All-rounder

Professional teams
- 2017–2021: Valcar–PBM
- 2022–: Trek–Segafredo

Major wins
- Road Major Tours Giro d'Italia Points classification (2026) 6 individual stages (2022, 2026) One-day races and Classics World Road Race Championships (2021) National Road Race Championships (2022) Trofeo Alfredo Binda (2022, 2024, 2025) Classic Brugge–De Panne (2022, 2024) Gent–Wevelgem (2022) Track World Championships Team pursuit (2022)
Medal record
Representing Italy
Women's track cycling
World Championships
Gold medal – first place	2022 Saint-Quentin-en-Yvelines	Team pursuit
Silver medal – second place	2021 Roubaix	Team pursuit
Silver medal – second place	2026 Shanghai	Team pursuit
Bronze medal – third place	2018 Apeldoorn	Team pursuit
Bronze medal – third place	2020 Berlin	Madison
Bronze medal – third place	2021 Roubaix	Omnium
European Games
Gold medal – first place	2019 Minsk	Team pursuit
Bronze medal – third place	2019 Minsk	Omnium
European Championships
Gold medal – first place	2016 Yvelines	Team pursuit
Gold medal – first place	2017 Berlin	Team pursuit
Gold medal – first place	2020 Plovdiv	Omnium
Gold medal – first place	2020 Plovdiv	Madison
Gold medal – first place	2024 Apeldoorn	Team pursuit
Silver medal – second place	2018 Glasgow	Team pursuit
Silver medal – second place	2020 Plovdiv	Team pursuit
Silver medal – second place	2023 Grenchen	Team pursuit
Bronze medal – third place	2017 Berlin	Omnium
Bronze medal – third place	2019 Apeldoorn	Team pursuit
Bronze medal – third place	2023 Grenchen	Madison
Bronze medal – third place	2024 Apeldoorn	Madison
Bronze medal – third place	2026 Konya	Team pursuit
Bronze medal – third place	2026 Konya	Madison
Junior World Championships
Gold medal – first place	2015 Astana	Scratch
Gold medal – first place	2016 Aigle	Team pursuit
Gold medal – first place	2016 Aigle	Omnium
U23 & Junior European Championships
Gold medal – first place	2015 Athens	Junior Team pursuit
Gold medal – first place	2016 Montichiari	Junior Team pursuit
Gold medal – first place	2016 Montichiari	Junior Omnium
Gold medal – first place	2017 Sangalhos	U23 Team pursuit
Gold medal – first place	2017 Sangalhos	U23 Omnium
Gold medal – first place	2018 Aigle	U23 Team pursuit
Gold medal – first place	2019 Ghent	U23 Team pursuit
Gold medal – first place	2019 Ghent	U23 Madison
Bronze medal – third place	2017 Sangalhos	U23 Madison
Bronze medal – third place	2018 Aigle	U23 Madison
Women's road bicycle racing
World Championships
Gold medal – first place	2016 Doha	Junior Road race
Gold medal – first place	2021 Flanders	Road race
European Championships
Gold medal – first place	2020 Plouay	U23 Road race
Silver medal – second place	2016 Plumelec	Junior Road race
Silver medal – second place	2022 Munich	Road race
Silver medal – second place	2024 Limburg	Road race

Elisa Balsamo (born 27 February 1998) is an Italian road and track cyclist, who currently rides for UCI Women's World Team Lidl–Trek, and represents Italy at international competitions.

After competing at the 2015 UCI Road World Championships in the women's junior road race she became junior world champion at the 2016 UCI Road World Championships in the junior's road race. She won the gold medal at the 2016 UEC European Track Championships in the team pursuit.

== Early life ==
Balsamo was born in Cuneo in 1998. Her father was an amateur cyclist. Before taking up cycling, she had competed in a number of skiing disciplines, as well as biathlon and swimming.

== Career ==
Balsamo's first major win came at the 2016 UCI Road World Championships in Doha, where she won the Junior Road Race in a bunch sprint ahead of Skylar Schneider. She signed for Valcar–PBM for the 2017 season. Her first professional win came at the Omloop van Borsele in April 2018, followed by a win at the GP Bruno Beghelli later in the year.

In 2019, Balsamo finished first in a bunch sprint at the Dwars door de Westhoek, as well as stages at the Tour of California and the Giro delle Marche in Rosa. In 2020, Balsamo won the final stage of the Madrid Challenge, overtaking Lorena Wiebes in the final 50 metres.

Balsamo began the 2021 season with a win at the GP Oetingen. She competed for Italy at the 2020 Summer Olympics; whilst she broke the Italian record as part of the team pursuit, she finished in 8th position in the madison and outside the Top 10 in the omnium. After a period of stage racing in Spain and The Netherlands, during which she finished second in the Grand Prix d'Isbergues, she was selected as part of the Italian team for the UCI Road World Championships. After a number of attempts by the Dutch team to break away from the group, Balsamo won the bunch sprint from the remaining group of around 25 riders, ahead of Marianne Vos. Her first win as World Champion came at The Women's Tour, in which she won the final stage.

In 2026, Balsamo finished stage 1 of the Giro d'Italia Women second and was awarded first place after Lorena Wiebes was disqualified. Balsamo went on to finish first in stages 2 and 3 of the Giro, keeping the leaders jersey. She lost the general classification lead to Anna van der Breggen in stage 4, the mountain time trial, but continued to do well, winning the 6th stage of the Giro.

== Major results ==
=== Road ===
2015
3rd Road race, National Junior Championships
5th Trofeo Avis Suvereto
6th Road race, UCI World Junior Championships
6th Giro della Provincia di Pordenone
2016
1st Road race, UCI World Junior Championships
1st Road race, National Junior Championships
2nd Road race, UEC European Junior Championships
2nd Gent–Wevelgem Juniors
3rd Trofeo Mendelspeck
4th Gran Premio Hotel Fiera Bolzano
7th Trofeo Oro
8th Memorial Diego e Stefano Trovó
2017
1st Giro Dei Due Comuni
1st Grand Prix Crevoisier
1st Sprints classification, Giro della Toscana
2nd Gran Premio Bruno Beghelli
2nd Sparkassen Giro
2nd Memorial F. Basso
7th SwissEver GP Cham-Hagendorn
2018 (2 pro wins)
1st Omloop van Borsele
1st Gran Premio Bruno Beghelli
2nd Grand Prix de Dottignies
5th Time trial, UEC European Under-23 Championships
2019 (4)
1st Trofee Maarten Wynants
1st Dwars door de Westhoek
1st Stage 3 Tour of California
1st Stage 2 Giro delle Marche in Rosa
2nd Omloop van Borsele
2020 (1)
1st Road race, UEC European Under-23 Championships
1st Stage 3 Ceratizit Challenge by La Vuelta
2021 (3)
1st Road race, UCI World Championships
1st Stage 6 The Women's Tour
3rd Scheldeprijs
3rd Brabantse Pijl
4th Gent–Wevelgem
7th Trofeo Alfredo Binda
7th Dwars door de Westhoek
10th Road race, UEC European Championships
2022 (9)
1st Road race, National Championships
1st Trofeo Alfredo Binda
1st Classic Brugge–De Panne
1st Gent–Wevelgem
Giro Donne

1st Stages 1 & 4

Challenge by La Vuelta

1st Stages 1 (TTT) & 5

1st Stage 1 Setmana Ciclista Valenciana
1st Stage 3 Tour de Suisse
2nd Road race, UEC European Championships
2nd Ronde van Drenthe
4th Tre Valli Varesine
8th Amstel Gold Race
2023 (3)
Setmana Ciclista Valenciana

1st Stages 1 & 2

1st Stage 1 Simac Ladies Tour
2nd Trofeo Alfredo Binda
2nd Classic Brugge–De Panne
4th Ronde van Drenthe
4th Nokere Koerse
2024 (5)
1st Trofeo Alfredo Binda
1st Classic Brugge–De Panne
Volta a Catalunya

1st Stages 1 & 3

Tour de Romandie

1st Points classification
1st Stage 1

2nd Road race, UEC European Championships
2nd Paris–Roubaix
2nd Ronde van Drenthe
2nd Gent–Wevelgem
4th Classic Lorient Agglomération
7th Scheldeprijs
10th Omloop Het Nieuwsblad
2025 (5)
1st Trofeo Alfredo Binda
1st Scheldeprijs
1st Stage 3 Tour de Suisse
2nd Gent–Wevelgem
2nd Copenhagen Sprint
3rd Classic Brugge–De Panne
3rd Dwars door Vlaanderen
4th Overall Setmana Ciclista Valenciana

1st Points classification
1st Stages 3 & 4

7th Milan–San Remo
9th Paris–Roubaix
2026 (6)
Giro d'Italia

1st Points classification
1st Stages 1, 2, 3 & 6

1st Classic Lorient Agglomération
1st Egmont Cycling Race
2nd Tour of Bruges
2nd Overall Tour de Pologne Women
3rd Scheldeprijs
6th Copenhagen Sprint
8th Milan–San Remo

=== Classics results timeline ===
Monuments	2017	2018	2019	2020	2021	2022	2023	2024	2025
Milan–San Remo	Not held								7
Tour of Flanders	—	74	DNF	—	15	28	38	47	
Paris–Roubaix	Race did not exist			NH	57	DSQ	58	2	9
Liège–Bastogne–Liège	—	DNF	83	38	—	—	—	—	
Classic	2017	2018	2019	2020	2021	2022	2023	2024	2025
Omloop Het Nieuwsblad	—	—	—	—	19	4	61	10	31
Strade Bianche	76	—	—	33	55	45	31	—	—
Ronde van Drenthe	—	25	DNF	NH	—	2	4	2	NH
Trofeo Alfredo Binda	35	11	42	NH	7	1	2	1	1
Classic Brugge–De Panne	—	11	5	15	5	1	2	1	3
Gent–Wevelgem	—	54	9	—	DNF	1	68	2	2
Amstel Gold Race	—	38	10	NH	49	8	76	—	
La Flèche Wallonne	—	38	54	46	—	—	—	—	
GP de Plouay	—	—	15	—	—	15	15	4	
Open de Suède Vårgårda	—	19	—	Not held		—	Not held		

=== Track ===
2015
1st Scratch, UCI World Junior Championships
1st Team pursuit, UEC European Junior Championships
1st Team pursuit, National Junior Championships
2016
1st Team pursuit, UEC European Championships
UCI World Junior Championships

1st Omnium
1st Team pursuit

UEC European Junior Championships

1st Omnium
1st Team pursuit

1st Scratch, National Junior Championships
1st Individual pursuit, 3 Jours d'Aigle
2nd Team pursuit, UCI World Cup, Glasgow
2017
UEC European Championships

1st Team pursuit
3rd Omnium

UEC European Under-23 Championships

1st Omnium
1st Team pursuit
3rd Madison

UCI World Cup, Pruszków

1st Team pursuit
3rd Individual pursuit
3rd Madison (with Maria Giulia Confalonieri)

6 Giorni di Torino internazionale

1st Omnium
1st Points

Belgian International Meeting

2nd Omnium
3rd Madison (with Rachele Barbieri)

2nd Omnium, Prilba Moravy
2018
UEC European Under-23 Championships

1st Team pursuit
3rd Madison

1st Madison, National Championships
2nd Team pursuit, UEC European Championships
3rd Team pursuit, UCI World Championships
2022
1st Team pursuit, UCI World Championships
