= Lara Krähemann =

Swiss cyclist

Personal information
- Born: 12 October 1999 (age 27)

Cycling career
- Sport: Cycling
- Discipline: Road
- Role: Rider

Amateur team
- 2017–2019: Brunex Felt Team

Professional team
- 2020: Cogeas–Mettler–Look

Lara Krähemann (born 12 October 1999) is a Swiss professional racing cyclist, who most recently rode for UCI Women's Continental Team Cogeas–Mettler–Look. In August 2020, she rode in the 2020 Strade Bianche Women's race in Italy.
