= 2022 Gent–Wevelgem (women's race) =

Cycling race

2022 UCI Women's World Tour, race 5 of 23
- Event poster with previous winners Marianne Vos and Wout van Aert

Race details
- Dates: 27 March 2022
- Stages: 1
- Distance: 159 km (99 mi)
- Winning time: 3h 39' 15"

Results
	Winner	Elisa Balsamo (ITA)	(Trek–Segafredo)
	Second	Marianne Vos (NED)	(Team Jumbo–Visma)
	Third	Maria Giulia Confalonieri (ITA)	(Ceratizit–WNT Pro Cycling)

The eleventh edition of the Gent–Wevelgem's women's race was held on Sunday 27 March 2022. It was the fifth event of the 2022 UCI Women's World Tour.

The race was won by Italian rider Elisa Balsamo of Trek–Segafredo in a sprint finish.

== Teams ==
All fourteen UCI Women's WorldTeams and ten UCI Women's Continental Teams will compete in the race.

UCI Women's WorldTeams

- Canyon//SRAM
- EF Education–Tibco–SVB
- FDJ Nouvelle-Aquitaine Futuroscope
- Human Powered Health
- Team Jumbo–Visma
- Liv Racing Xstra
- Movistar Team
- Roland Cogeas Edelweiss Squad
- SD Worx
- Team BikeExchange–Jayco
- Team DSM
- Trek–Segafredo
- UAE Team ADQ
- Uno-X Pro Cycling Team

UCI Women's Continental Teams

- Valcar–Travel & Service
- Ceratizit–WNT Pro Cycling
- Parkhotel Valkenburg
- Bingoal Casino–Chevalmeire–Van Eyck Sport
- Cofidis
- Lotto–Soudal Ladies
- Le Col–Wahoo
- Multum Accountants Ladies
- AG Insurance–NXTG
- Plantur–Pura

== Result ==
Result (1–10)
Rank	Rider	Team	Time
1	Elisa Balsamo (ITA)	Trek–Segafredo	3h 39' 15"
2	Marianne Vos (NED)	Team Jumbo–Visma	+ 0"
3	Maria Giulia Confalonieri (ITA)	Ceratizit–WNT Pro Cycling	+ 0"
4	Lotte Kopecky (BEL)	SD Worx	+ 0"
5	Emma Norsgaard Jørgensen (DEN)	Movistar Team	+ 0"
6	Marta Bastianelli (ITA)	UAE Team ADQ	+ 0"
7	Susanne Andersen (NOR)	Uno-X Pro Cycling Team	+ 0"
8	Tamara Dronova	Roland Cogeas Edelweiss Squad	+ 0"
9	Silvia Persico (ITA)	Valcar–Travel & Service	+ 0"
10	Clara Copponi (FRA)	FDJ Nouvelle-Aquitaine Futuroscope	+ 0"

== See also ==
- 2022 in women's road cycling
