= Rouleur (magazine) =

British cycling magazine

- The first issue of Rouleur, July 2005
- Editor: Edward Pickering
- Former editors: Guy Andrews, Ian Cleverly, Andy McGrath
- Categories: Cycling
- Frequency: 8 issues a year
- Publisher: Sterling
- Founder: Guy Andrews
- Founded: 2005
- First issue: July 2005; 20 years ago
- Company: Gruppo Media
- Country: United Kingdom
- Based in: London
- Language: English
- Website: rouleur.cc
- ISSN: 1752-962X

Rouleur is a British cycling magazine founded by Guy Andrews and first published in 2005 by sportswear brand Rapha and later as a part of Gruppo Media Ltd.

In November 2015 the magazine hosted its first live event, called 'Rouleur Classic'. The event is held annually in November and changed its name to 'Rouleur Live' in 2021. The event is focused around cycling culture and showcases the biggest brands in the sport as well as guest speakers from the cycling world.

== Content ==
The magazine is edited by Edward Pickering with Richard Windsor as digital editor. Art direction is by Enric Adell. Staff writer is Rachel Jary. Contributors vary but have included; Matt Seaton, Morten Okbo, Ned Boulting, Paul Fournel and Jorgen Leth amongst others.
