= Born to Win BTC City Ljubljana =

Italian cycling team

Team information
- UCI code: BTW
- Registered: Italy
- Founded: 2016
- Discipline: Road
- Status: National (2018–2020); UCI Women's Team (2021–)
- Bicycles: Guerciotti

Team name history
2016-2019	Born To Win
2020	Born To Win G20–Boiler Parts–Ambedo
2021–2022	Born to Win G20 Ambedo
2023	Born To Win-Zhiraf-G20
2024	BTC City Ljubljana Zhiraf Ambedo
2025	Born to Win BTC City Ljubljana Zhiraf
2026-	Born to Win BTC City Ljubljana

Born to Win BTC City Ljubljana is a professional Women's road bicycle racing team based in Italy.

== History ==
The team were founded in 2016 under the name Born to Win. Founded initially as an amateur team, the team began competing in professional races in 2017 and expanded their roster in 2018. Following the Giro Donne in 2021, in which rider Anastasia Carbonari was involved in a breakaway, Zhiraf joined the team as a sponsor, with BTC City joining in 2024.

In 2025, the team partnered with Ljubljana to become known as Born to Win BTC City Ljubljana Zhiraf. As of 2026 the team goes by the name Born to Win BTC City Ljubljana.

== Team roster ==
As of 28 February 2021.

Rider	Date of birth
Francesca Balducci (ITA)	1 May 1996 (age 30)
Angelica Brogi (ITA)	20 October 1998 (age 27)
Anastasia Carbonari (ITA)	11 September 1999 (age 27)
Caris Cosentino (ITA)	18 September 1999 (age 27)
Elena Franchi (ITA)	26 August 1996 (age 30)

Rider	Date of birth
Leonora Geppi (ITA)	9 December 1999 (age 26)
Alice Palazzi (ITA)	25 January 2002 (age 24)
Martina Sgrisleri (ITA)	14 November 2001 (age 24)
Giorgia Simoni (ITA)	24 March 2002 (age 24)

== Major results ==
2022
Bergrennen Silenen–Amsteg–Bristen, Lara Krähemann

2023
Berner Rundfahrt, Lea Fuchs
GP Cham–Hagendorn, Lea Fuchs
