= Lidl–Trek (women's team) =

American cycling team

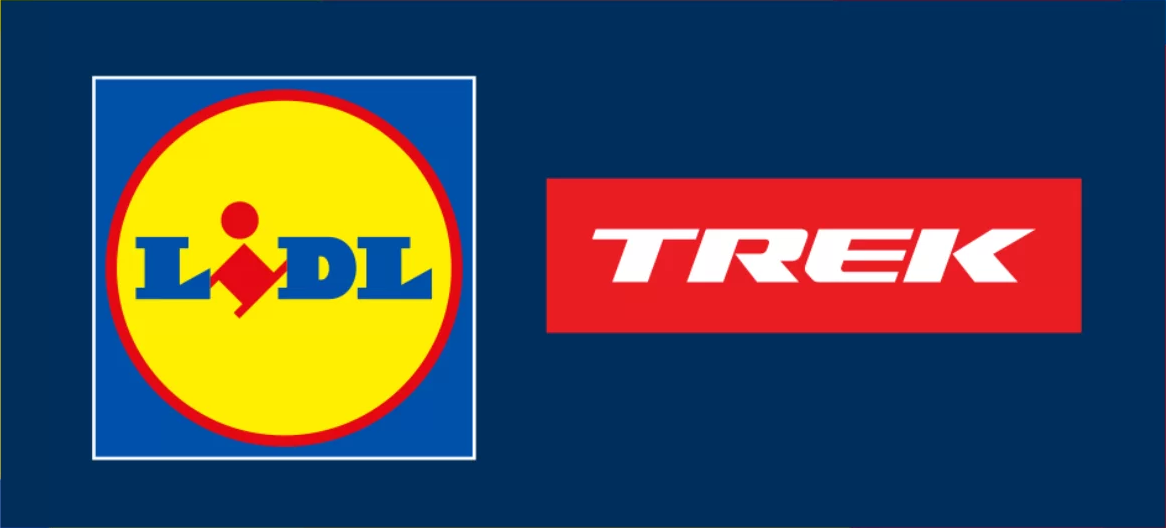

Team information
- UCI code: LTK
- Registered: United States; Germany (2026–present)
- Founded: 2018
- Discipline: Road
- Status: UCI Women's Team (2018–2019); UCI Women's WorldTeam (2020–present)
- Bicycles: Trek
- Components: SRAM
- Website: Team home page

Key personnel
- General manager: Luca Guercilena
- Team manager: Ina-Yoko Teutenberg

Team name history
- 2018 2019–2023 2023–: Trek Factory Racing; Trek–Segafredo; Lidl–Trek

Lidl–Trek is a professional cycling team that competes in elite road bicycle racing events such as the UCI Women's World Tour.

== History ==
In July 2018, Cyclingnews reported that a new UCI Women's team would be set up by the same management as the men's UCI WorldTeam Trek–Segafredo program. Days later the team announced that Boels–Dolmans rider Lizzie Deignan would lead the team. The following month Elisa Longo Borghini (Wiggle High5) confirmed that she would also be joining the team.

In August Ina-Yoko Teutenberg announced that she would be directing the newly announced team as their head directeur sportif. The same month Giorgia Bronzini announced that she would retire at the end of the season and become a DS with the team in 2019.

In September, it was announced that the team had secured further sponsorship from the Massimo Zanetti Beverage Group, owner of the Italian coffee brand Segafredo, in a deal covering a two-year co-title partnership, and the women's team would then be known as Trek–Segafredo, like the men's.

In 2023, it was announced that both the men's and women's teams would rebrand as Lidl–Trek, thanks to sponsorship from supermarket chain Lidl. This rebrand would come into effect on June 30, prior to the Giro Donne and the Tour de France / Tour de France Femmes. In October 2025 Lidl became majority owner of the team.

== Team roster ==
As of 17 January 2025.

Rider	Date of birth
Elisa Balsamo (ITA)	27 February 1998 (age 28)
Lucinda Brand (NED)	2 July 1989 (age 37)
Clara Copponi (FRA)	12 January 1999 (age 27)
Lizzie Deignan (GBR)	18 December 1988 (age 37)
Niamh Fisher-Black (NZL)	12 August 2000 (age 26)
Lauretta Hanson (AUS)	29 October 1994 (age 31)
Anna Henderson (GBR)	14 October 1998 (age 27)
Ava Holmgren (CAN)	22 May 2005 (age 21)
Isabella Holmgren (CAN)	22 May 2005 (age 21)
Riejanne Markus (NED)	9 January 1994 (age 32)

Rider	Date of birth
Fleur Moors (BEL)	11 October 2005 (age 20)
Emma Norsgaard (DEN)	26 July 1999 (age 27)
Gaia Realini (ITA)	19 June 2001 (age 25)
Ilaria Sanguineti (ITA)	15 April 1994 (age 32)
Izzy Sharp (GBR)	29 June 2005 (age 21)
Amanda Spratt (AUS)	17 September 1987 (age 38)
Shirin van Anrooij (NED)	5 February 2002 (age 24)
Ellen van Dijk (NED)	11 February 1987 (age 39)
Felicity Wilson-Haffenden (AUS)	16 July 2005 (age 21)

== Major results ==
2019
Stage 1 Women's Tour Down Under, Letizia Paternoster
Stage 1 Setmana Ciclista Valenciana, Ruth Winder
Stages 2 & 4 Setmana Ciclista Valenciana, Lotta Lepistö
Drentse Acht van Westerveld, Audrey Cordon-Ragot
Dwars door Vlaanderen, Ellen van Dijk
Stage 4a (ITT) Healthy Ageing Tour, Ellen van Dijk
Overall Emakumeen Bira, Elisa Longo Borghini

Points classification
Mountains classification
Stage 3, Tayler Wiles
Stage 4, Elisa Longo Borghini

Overall The Women's Tour, Lizzie Deignan

Points classification, Lizzie Deignan
British rider classification, Lizzie Deignan
Team classification (Note: The winning riders were Lizzie Deignan, Elisa Longo Borghini, Anna Plichta, Ellen van Dijk, Abi Van Twisk, and Trixi Worrack.)
Stage 5, Lizzie Deignan

Postnord UCI WWT Vårgårda West Sweden TTT (Note: The winning riders were Audrey Cordon-Ragot, Elisa Longo Borghini, Ellen van Dijk, Tayler Wiles, Ruth Winder, and Trixi Worrack.)
2020
Overall Women's Tour Down Under, Ruth Winder

Stage 2, Ruth Winder

GP de Plouay, Lizzie Deignan
La Course by Le Tour de France, Lizzie Deignan
Stage 1 (TTT), Giro Rosa (Note: The winning riders were Audrey Cordon-Ragot, Lizzie Deignan, Elisa Longo Borghini, Ellen van Dijk, Tayler Wiles, and Ruth Winder.)
2021
Overall Healthy Ageing Tour, Ellen van Dijk

Combined classification, Ellen van Dijk
Stage 2 (ITT), Ellen van Dijk

Trofeo Alfredo Binda, Elisa Longo Borghini
Brabantse Pijl Dames Gooik, Ruth Winder
Overall Thüringen Ladies Tour, Lucinda Brand

Stages 3 & 5, Lucinda Brand
Team classification (Note: The winning riders were Lucinda Brand, Audrey Cordon-Ragot, Lizzie Deignan, Ellen van Dijk, and Trixi Worrack.)

Prologue Lotto Belgium Tour, Ellen van Dijk
Stage 1 (TTT), Giro Rosa (Note: The winning riders were Lucinda Brand, Lizzie Deignan, Elisa Longo Borghini, Ellen van Dijk, Tayler Wiles, and Ruth Winder.)
Stage 4 Ladies Tour of Norway, Chloe Hosking
GP de Plouay, Elisa Longo Borghini
Tour Cycliste Féminin International de l'Ardèche

Stage 3, Chloe Hosking
Stage 4, Ruth Winder
Stage 7, Lucinda Brand

Paris–Roubaix, Lizzie Deignan
2022
Stage 1 Setmana Ciclista Valenciana, Elisa Balsamo
Stage 2 Setmana Ciclista Valenciana, Ellen van Dijk
Overall Bloeizone Fryslân Tour, Ellen van Dijk

Stage 1 (ITT), Ellen van Dijk

Trofeo Alfredo Binda, Elisa Balsamo
Classic Brugge–De Panne, Elisa Balsamo
Gent–Wevelgem, Elisa Balsamo
Paris–Roubaix, Elisa Longo Borghini
Postnord UCI WWT Vårgårda West Sweden TTT (Note: The winning riders were Audrey Cordon-Ragot, Amalie Dideriksen, Ellen van Dijk, Shirin van Anrooij, and Ellen van Dijk.)

== National and Continental Champions ==
2019
Swiss Cyclo-cross, Jolanda Neff
Poland Time Trial, Anna Plichta
United States Road Race, Ruth Winder
European Time Trial, Ellen van Dijk
2020
Poland Time Trial, Anna Plichta
Italy Time Trial, Elisa Longo Borghini
Italy Road Race, Elisa Longo Borghini
France Road Race, Audrey Cordon-Ragot
2021
France Time Trial, Audrey Cordon-Ragot
Italy Time Trial, Elisa Longo Borghini
Italy Road Race, Elisa Longo Borghini
Denmark Road Race, Amalie Dideriksen
European Road Race, Ellen van Dijk
World Time Trial, Ellen van Dijk
World Track (Elimination race), Letizia Paternoster
European Cyclo-cross, Lucinda Brand
European U23 Cyclo-cross, Shirin van Anrooij
Denmark Track (Points race), Amalie Dideriksen
Denmark Track (Omnium), Amalie Dideriksen
Denmark Track (Madison), Amalie Dideriksen
2022
Netherlands Time Trial, Ellen van Dijk
Italy Time Trial, Elisa Longo Borghini
Netherlands U23 Time Trial, Shirin van Anrooij
France Time Trial, Audrey Cordon-Ragot
United States Time Trial, Leah Thomas
France Road Race, Audrey Cordon-Ragot
2023
Australia Road Race, Brodie Chapman
Italy Time Trial, Elisa Longo Borghini
Italy Road Race, Elisa Longo Borghini
