= List of teams and cyclists in the 2022 Tour de France Femmes =

List of cyclists

144 riders across 24 six-member teams took part in the 2022 Tour de France Femmes. Twenty-five nationalities took part, with the largest percentage being Dutch (20% of the peloton). 109 riders finished the event.

== Teams ==
UCI Women's WorldTeams

- Canyon//SRAM
- EF Education–Tibco–SVB
- FDJ Suez Futuroscope
- Human Powered Health
- Liv Racing Xstra
- Movistar Team
- Roland Cogeas Edelweiss Squad
- SD Worx
- Team BikeExchange–Jayco
- Team DSM
- Team Jumbo–Visma
- Trek–Segafredo
- UAE Team ADQ
- Uno-X Pro Cycling Team

UCI Women's Continental Teams

- AG Insurance–NXTG
- Arkéa–B&B Hotels Women
- Ceratizit–WNT Pro Cycling
- Cofidis
- Le Col–Wahoo
- Parkhotel Valkenburg
- Plantur–Pura
- Stade Rochelais Charente-Maritime
- St. Michel–Auber93
- Valcar–Travel & Service

== Cyclists ==
Legend
No.	Starting number worn by the rider during the Tour
Pos.	Position in the general classification
Time	Deficit to the winner of the general classification
†	Denotes riders born on or after 1 January 2000 eligible for the Young rider classification
General classification	Denotes the winner of the general classification
Points classification	Denotes the winner of the points classification
Mountains classification	Denotes the winner of the mountains classification
Young rider classification	Denotes the winner of the young rider classification (eligibility indicated by †)
Team classification	Denotes riders that represent the winner of the team classification
Super-combativity award	Denotes the winner of the super-combativity award
DNS	Denotes a rider who did not start a stage, followed by the stage before which she withdrew
DNF	Denotes a rider who did not finish a stage, followed by the stage in which she withdrew
DSQ	Denotes a rider who was disqualified from the race, followed by the stage in which this occurred
OTL	Denotes a rider finished outside the time limit, followed by the stage in which they did so
COV	Denotes a rider who withdrawn because of COVID-19 either because she tested positive or two members of team tested positive, followed by the stage before which she withdrew
Ages correct as of Sunday 24 July 2022, the date on which the Tour began

=== By starting number ===
No.	Name	Nationality	Team	Age	Pos.	Time	Ref.
1	Elisa Balsamo	Italy	Trek–Segafredo	24	37	+ 48' 41"	
2	Elisa Longo Borghini	Italy	Trek–Segafredo	30	6	+ 8' 26"	
3	Audrey Cordon-Ragot	France	Trek–Segafredo	32	78	+ 1h 11' 13"	
4	Leah Thomas	United States	Trek–Segafredo	33	53	+ 58' 29"	
5	Shirin van Anrooij †	Netherlands	Trek–Segafredo	20	14	+ 25' 50"	
6	Ellen van Dijk	Netherlands	Trek–Segafredo	35	30	+ 41' 37"	
11	Annemiek van Vleuten	Netherlands	Movistar Team	39	1	26h 55' 44"	
12	Aude Biannic	France	Movistar Team	31	94	+ 1h 23' 00"	
13	Sheyla Gutiérrez	Spain	Movistar Team	28	96	+ 1h 26' 44"	
14	Emma Norsgaard	Denmark	Movistar Team	22	DNF-5	–	
15	Paula Andrea Patiño	Colombia	Movistar Team	25	23	+ 35' 19"	
16	Arlenis Sierra	Cuba	Movistar Team	29	27	+ 40' 45"	
21	Demi Vollering	Netherlands	SD Worx	25	2	+ 3' 48"	
22	Lotte Kopecky	Belgium	SD Worx	26	38	+ 49' 30"	
23	Christine Majerus	Luxembourg	SD Worx	35	72	+ 1h 07' 39"	
24	Ashleigh Moolman	South Africa	SD Worx	36	DNS-8	–	
25	Marlen Reusser	Switzerland	SD Worx	30	DNS-7	–	
26	Chantal van den Broek-Blaak	Netherlands	SD Worx	32	49	+ 57' 17"	
31	Cecilie Uttrup Ludwig	Denmark	FDJ Suez Futuroscope	26	7	+ 8' 59"	
32	Grace Brown	Australia	FDJ Suez Futuroscope	30	20	+ 31' 01"	
33	Marta Cavalli	Italy	FDJ Suez Futuroscope	24	DNF-2	–	
34	Vittoria Guazzini †	Italy	FDJ Suez Futuroscope	21	39	+ 49' 38"	
35	Marie Le Net †	France	FDJ Suez Futuroscope	22	43	+ 53' 25"	
36	Évita Muzic	France	FDJ Suez Futuroscope	23	8	+ 13' 54"	
41	Marianne Vos	Netherlands	Team Jumbo–Visma	35	26	+ 36' 56"	
42	Anna Henderson	Great Britain	Team Jumbo–Visma	23	DNS-8	–	
43	Riejanne Markus	Netherlands	Team Jumbo–Visma	27	12	+ 18' 27"	
44	Romy Kasper	Germany	Team Jumbo–Visma	34	35	+ 45' 46"	
45	Noemi Rüegg †	Switzerland	Team Jumbo–Visma	21	105	+ 1h 35' 37"	
46	Karlijn Swinkels	Netherlands	Team Jumbo–Visma	23	33	+ 42' 44"	
51	Juliette Labous	France	Team DSM	23	4	+ 7' 28"	
52	Pfeiffer Georgi †	Great Britain	Team DSM	21	50	+ 57' 44"	
53	Franziska Koch †	Germany	Team DSM	22	OTL-7	–	
54	Charlotte Kool	Netherlands	Team DSM	23	DNF-4	–	
55	Liane Lippert	Germany	Team DSM	24	16	+ 29' 49"	
56	Lorena Wiebes	Netherlands	Team DSM	23	DNF-7	–	
61	Katarzyna Niewiadoma	Poland	Canyon//SRAM	27	3	+ 6' 35"	
62	Alena Amialiusik	(Note: As of 1 March 2022, the UCI announced that cyclists from Russia and Belarus would no longer compete under the name or flag of those respective countries due to the Russian invasion of Ukraine.)	Canyon//SRAM	33	19	+ 30' 51"	
63	Elise Chabbey	Switzerland	Canyon//SRAM	29	11	+ 16' 44"	
64	Tiffany Cromwell	Australia	Canyon//SRAM	34	67	+ 1h 04' 31"	
65	Soraya Paladin	Italy	Canyon//SRAM	29	77	+ 1h 11' 06"	
66	Pauliena Rooijakkers	Netherlands	Canyon//SRAM	29	22	+ 35' 08"	
71	Mavi García	Spain	UAE Team ADQ	38	10	+ 15' 15"	
72	Marta Bastianelli	Italy	UAE Team ADQ	35	61	+ 1h 01' 54"	
73	Urša Pintar	Slovenia	UAE Team ADQ	36	OTL-2	–	
74	Maaike Boogaard	Netherlands	UAE Team ADQ	23	54	+ 58' 33"	
75	Eugenia Bujak	Slovenia	UAE Team ADQ	33	103	+ 1h 34' 06"	
76	Erica Magnaldi	Italy	UAE Team ADQ	29	18	+ 30' 15"	
81	Amanda Spratt	Australia	Team BikeExchange–Jayco	34	DNS-3	–	
82	Kristen Faulkner	United States	Team BikeExchange–Jayco	29	40	+ 50' 10"	
83	Alexandra Manly	Australia	Team BikeExchange–Jayco	26	41	+ 50' 34"	
84	Ruby Roseman-Gannon	Australia	Team BikeExchange–Jayco	23	42	+ 51' 24"	
85	Ane Santesteban	Spain	Team BikeExchange–Jayco	31	60	+ 1h 01' 30"	
86	Urška Žigart	Slovenia	Team BikeExchange–Jayco	25	29	+ 41' 11"	
91	Lisa Brennauer	Germany	Ceratizit–WNT Pro Cycling	34	58	+ 1h 01' 01"	
92	Sandra Alonso	Spain	Ceratizit–WNT Pro Cycling	23	44	+ 53' 27"	
93	Laura Asencio	France	Ceratizit–WNT Pro Cycling	24	57	+ 1h 00' 49"	
94	Maria Giulia Confalonieri	Italy	Ceratizit–WNT Pro Cycling	29	75	+ 1h 09' 49"	
95	Marta Lach	Poland	Ceratizit–WNT Pro Cycling	25	DNS-6	–	
96	Kathrin Schweinberger	Austria	Ceratizit–WNT Pro Cycling	25	99	+ 1h 29' 51"	
101	Olivia Baril	Canada	Valcar–Travel & Service	24	104	+ 1h 34' 22"	
102	Alice Maria Arzuffi	Italy	Valcar–Travel & Service	27	64	+ 1h 02' 59"	
103	Eleonora Camilla Gasparrini †	Italy	Valcar–Travel & Service	20	DNS-6	–	
104	Silvia Persico	Italy	Valcar–Travel & Service	24	5	+ 8' 00"	
105	Ilaria Sanguineti	Italy	Valcar–Travel & Service	28	90	+ 1h 20' 31"	
106	Margaux Vigie	France	Valcar–Travel & Service	27	OTL-7	–	
111	Rachel Neylan	Australia	Cofidis	40	28	+ 40' 59"	
112	Martina Alzini	Italy	Cofidis	25	DNF-6	–	
113	Victoire Berteau †	France	Cofidis	21	68	+ 1h 04' 44"	
114	Alana Castrique	Belgium	Cofidis	23	DNF-1	–	
115	Valentine Fortin	France	Cofidis	23	88	+ 1h 19' 05"	
116	Sandra Lévénez	France	Cofidis	43	89	+ 1h 20' 12"	
121	Jeanne Korevaar	Netherlands	Liv Racing Xstra	25	31	+ 42' 14"	
122	Rachele Barbieri	Italy	Liv Racing Xstra	25	DNS-7	–	
123	Thalita de Jong	Netherlands	Liv Racing Xstra	28	69	+ 1h 04' 55"	
124	Valerie Demey	Belgium	Liv Racing Xstra	28	48	+ 55' 56"	
125	Silke Smulders †	Netherlands	Liv Racing Xstra	21	79	+ 1h 12' 06"	
126	Sabrina Stultiens	Netherlands	Liv Racing Xstra	29	86	+ 1h 17' 10"	
131	Veronica Ewers	United States	EF Education–Tibco–SVB	27	9	+ 15' 05"	
132	Letizia Borghesi	Italy	EF Education–Tibco–SVB	23	DNF-7	–	
133	Krista Doebel-Hickok	United States	EF Education–Tibco–SVB	33	34	+ 43' 45"	
134	Kathrin Hammes	Germany	EF Education–Tibco–SVB	33	65	+ 1h 03' 13"	
135	Emily Newsom	United States	EF Education–Tibco–SVB	38	OTL-7	–	
136	Magdeleine Vallieres †	Canada	EF Education–Tibco–SVB	20	66	+ 1h 04' 19"	
141	Julie de Wilde †	Belgium	Plantur–Pura	19	46	+ 54' 04"	
142	Sanne Cant	Belgium	Plantur–Pura	31	62	+ 1h 02' 20"	
143	Kim de Baat	Belgium	Plantur–Pura	31	109	+ 1h 54' 06"	
144	Yara Kastelijn	Netherlands	Plantur–Pura	24	13	+ 19' 53"	
145	Christina Schweinberger	Austria	Plantur–Pura	25	80	+ 1h 12' 43"	
146	Laura Süßemilch	Germany	Plantur–Pura	25	DNF-2	–	
151	Elizabeth Holden	Great Britain	Le Col–Wahoo	24	36	+ 47' 05"	
152	Eva van Agt	Netherlands	Le Col–Wahoo	25	52	+ 58' 08"	
153	Maike van der Duin †	Netherlands	Le Col–Wahoo	20	84	+ 1h 16' 02"	
154	Marjolein van 't Geloof	Netherlands	Le Col–Wahoo	26	DNS-6	–	
155	Jesse Vandenbulcke	Belgium	Le Col–Wahoo	26	83	+ 1h 14' 32"	
156	Gladys Verhulst	France	Le Col–Wahoo	25	DNF-7	–	
161	Femke Gerritse †	Netherlands	Parkhotel Valkenburg	21	74	+ 1h 09' 23"	
162	Mischa Bredewold †	Netherlands	Parkhotel Valkenburg	22	21	+ 31' 31"	
163	Nicole Frain	Australia	Parkhotel Valkenburg	29	DNF-7	–	
164	Femke Markus	Netherlands	Parkhotel Valkenburg	25	73	+ 1h 08' 44"	
165	Quinty Schoens	Netherlands	Parkhotel Valkenburg	23	56	+ 58' 55"	
166	Anne van Rooijen †	Netherlands	Parkhotel Valkenburg	22	DNF-7	–	
171	Julia Borgström †	Sweden	AG Insurance–NXTG	21	32	+ 42' 33"	
172	Anya Louw †	Australia	AG Insurance–NXTG	21	107	+ 1h 42' 00"	
173	Gaia Masetti †	Italy	AG Insurance–NXTG	20	DNF-2	–	
174	Lone Meertens	Belgium	AG Insurance–NXTG	24	102	+ 1h 33' 18"	
175	Ilse Pruimers †	Netherlands	AG Insurance–NXTG	20	93	+ 1h 22' 44"	
176	Ally Wollaston †	New Zealand	AG Insurance–NXTG	21	DNS-3	–	
181	Morgane Coston	France	Arkéa Pro Cycling Team	31	45	+ 53' 54"	
182	Pauline Allin	France	Arkéa Pro Cycling Team	27	95	+ 1h 25' 55"	
183	Yuliia Biriukova	Ukraine	Arkéa Pro Cycling Team	24	OTL-7	–	
184	Amandine Fouquenet †	France	Arkéa Pro Cycling Team	21	76	+ 1h 10' 52"	
185	Anais Morichon	France	Arkéa Pro Cycling Team	22	OTL-7	–	
186	Greta Richioud	France	Arkéa Pro Cycling Team	25	55	+ 58' 48"	
191	Joscelin Lowden	Great Britain	Uno-X Pro Cycling Team	34	47	+ 54' 59"	
192	Hannah Barnes	Great Britain	Uno-X Pro Cycling Team	29	100	+ 1h 31' 21"	
193	Julie Leth	Denmark	Uno-X Pro Cycling Team	30	81	+ 1h 13' 01"	
194	Hannah Ludwig †	Germany	Uno-X Pro Cycling Team	22	106	+ 1h 38' 41"	
195	Mie Bjørndal Ottestad	Norway	Uno-X Pro Cycling Team	25	17	+ 29' 50"	
196	Anne Dorthe Ysland †	Norway	Uno-X Pro Cycling Team	20	91	+ 1h 21' 93"	
201	Séverine Eraud	France	Stade Rochelais Charente-Maritime	27	51	+ 58' 06"	
202	Noémie Abgrall	France	Stade Rochelais Charente-Maritime	22	OTL-3	–	
203	India Grangier †	France	Stade Rochelais Charente-Maritime	22	OTL-7	–	
204	Natalie Grinczer	Great Britain	Stade Rochelais Charente-Maritime	28	DNF-3	–	
205	Frances Janse van Rensburg †	South Africa	Stade Rochelais Charente-Maritime	21	OTL-3	–	
206	Maeva Squiban †	France	Stade Rochelais Charente-Maritime	20	DNF-3	–	
211	Simone Boilard †	Canada	St. Michel–Auber93	22	71	+ 1h 06' 41"	
212	Alison Avoine †	France	St. Michel–Auber93	22	108	+ 1h 44' 29"	
213	Sandrine Bideau	France	St. Michel–Auber93	33	87	+ 1h 17' 38"	
214	Coralie Demay	France	St. Michel–Auber93	29	24	+ 35' 31"	
215	Barbara Fonseca	France	St. Michel–Auber93	31	85	+ 1h 16' 05"	
216	Margot Pompanon	France	St. Michel–Auber93	25	82	+ 1h 13' 10"	
221	Tamara Dronova		Roland Cogeas Edelweiss Squad	28	15	+ 28' 51"	
222	Caroline Baur	Switzerland	Roland Cogeas Edelweiss Squad	28	92	+ 1h 21' 34"	
223	Hannah Buch †	Germany	Roland Cogeas Edelweiss Squad	19	DNF-3	–	
224	Rotem Gafinovitz	Israel	Roland Cogeas Edelweiss Squad	30	101	+ 1h 32' 50"	
225	Petra Stiasny †	Switzerland	Roland Cogeas Edelweiss Squad	20	OTL-1	–	
226	Olga Zabelinskaya	Uzbekistan	Roland Cogeas Edelweiss Squad	42	97	+ 1h 27' 01"	
231	Henrietta Christie †	New Zealand	Human Powered Health	20	59	+ 1h 01' 04"	
232	Nina Buijsman	Netherlands	Human Powered Health	24	25	+ 36' 00"	
233	Antri Christoforou	Cyprus	Human Powered Health	30	70	+ 1h 05' 54"	
234	Barbara Malcotti †	Italy	Human Powered Health	22	DSQ-5	–	
235	Marit Raaijmakers	Netherlands	Human Powered Health	23	63	+ 1h 02' 56"	
236	Lily Williams	United States	Human Powered Health	28	98	+ 1h 29' 07"	

=== By team ===
(United States) Trek–Segafredo (TFS)
No.	Rider	Pos.
1	Elisa Balsamo (ITA)	37
2	Elisa Longo Borghini (ITA)	6
3	Audrey Cordon-Ragot (FRA)	78
4	Leah Thomas (USA)	53
5	Shirin van Anrooij (NED)	14
6	Ellen van Dijk (NED)	30

(Spain) Movistar Team (MOV)
No.	Rider	Pos.
11	Annemiek van Vleuten (NED)	1
12	Aude Biannic (FRA)	94
13	Sheyla Gutiérrez (ESP)	96
14	Emma Norsgaard (DEN)	DNF-5
15	Paula Andrea Patiño (COL)	23
16	Arlenis Sierra (CUB)	27

(Netherlands) SD Worx (SDW)
No.	Rider	Pos.
21	Demi Vollering (NED)	2
22	Lotte Kopecky (BEL)	38
23	Christine Majerus (LUX)	72
24	Ashleigh Moolman (RSA)	DNS-8
25	Marlen Reusser (SUI)	DNS-7
26	Chantal van den Broek-Blaak (NED)	49

(France) FDJ Suez Futuroscope (FDJ)
No.	Rider	Pos.
31	Cecilie Uttrup Ludwig (DEN)	7
32	Grace Brown (AUS)	20
33	Marta Cavalli (ITA)	DNF-2
34	Vittoria Guazzini (ITA)	39
35	Marie Le Net (FRA)	43
36	Évita Muzic (FRA)	8

(Netherlands) Team Jumbo–Visma (JVW)
No.	Rider	Pos.
41	Marianne Vos (NED)	26
42	Anna Henderson (GBR)	DNS-8
43	Riejanne Markus (NED)	12
44	Romy Kasper (GER)	35
45	Noemi Rüegg (SUI)	105
46	Karlijn Swinkels (NED)	33

(Netherlands) Team DSM (DSM)
No.	Rider	Pos.
51	Juliette Labous (FRA)	4
52	Pfeiffer Georgi (GBR)	50
53	Franziska Koch (GER)	OTL-7
54	Charlotte Kool (NED)	DNF-4
55	Liane Lippert (GER)	16
56	Lorena Wiebes (NED)	DNF-7

(Germany) Canyon//SRAM (CSR)
No.	Rider	Pos.
61	Katarzyna Niewiadoma (POL)	3
62	Alena Amialiusik	19
63	Elise Chabbey (SUI)	11
64	Tiffany Cromwell (AUS)	67
65	Soraya Paladin (ITA)	77
66	Pauliena Rooijakkers (NED)	22

(Italy) UAE Team ADQ (UAD)
No.	Rider	Pos.
71	Mavi García (ESP)	10
72	Marta Bastianelli (ITA)	61
73	Urša Pintar (SLO)	OTL-2
74	Maaike Boogaard (NED)	54
75	Eugenia Bujak (SLO)	103
76	Erica Magnaldi (ITA)	18

(Australia) Team BikeExchange–Jayco (BEX)
No.	Rider	Pos.
81	Amanda Spratt (AUS)	DNS-3
82	Kristen Faulkner (USA)	40
83	Alexandra Manly (AUS)	41
84	Ruby Roseman-Gannon (AUS)	42
85	Ane Santesteban (ESP)	60
86	Urška Žigart (SLO)	29

(Germany) Ceratizit–WNT Pro Cycling (WNT)
No.	Rider	Pos.
91	Lisa Brennauer (GER)	58
92	Sandra Alonso (ESP)	44
93	Laura Asencio (FRA)	57
94	Maria Giulia Confalonieri (ITA)	75
95	Marta Lach (POL)	DNS-6
96	Kathrin Schweinberger (AUT)	99

(Italy) Valcar–Travel & Service (VAL)
No.	Rider	Pos.
101	Olivia Baril (CAN)	104
102	Alica Maria Arzuffi (ITA)	64
103	Eleonora Camilla Gasparrini (ITA)	DNS-6
104	Silvia Persico (ITA)	5
105	Ilaria Sanguinetti (ITA)	90
106	Margaux Vigie (FRA)	OTL-7

(France) Cofidis (COD)
No.	Rider	Pos.
111	Rachel Neylan (AUS)	28
112	Martina Alzini (ITA)	DNF-6
113	Victoire Berteau (FRA)	68
114	Alana Castrique (BEL)	DNF-1
115	Valentine Fortin (FRA)	88
116	Sandra Lévénez (FRA)	89

(Netherlands) Liv Racing Xstra (DSB)
No.	Rider	Pos.
121	Jeanne Korevaar (NED)	31
122	Rachele Barbieri (ITA)	DNS-7
123	Thalita de Jong (NED)	69
124	Valerie Demey (BEL)	48
125	Silke Smulders (NED)	79
126	Sabrina Stultiens (NED)	86

(United States) EF Education–Tibco–SVB (EFE)
No.	Rider	Pos.
131	Veronica Ewers (USA)	9
132	Letizia Borghesi (ITA)	DNF-7
133	Krista Doebel-Hickok (USA)	34
134	Kathrin Hammes (GER)	65
135	Emily Newsom (USA)	OTL-7
136	Magdeleine Vallieres (CAN)	66

(Belgium) Plantur–Pura (PLP)
No.	Rider	Pos.
141	Julie de Wilde (BEL)	46
142	Sanne Cant (BEL)	62
143	Kim de Baat (BEL)	109
144	Yara Kastelijn (NED)	13
145	Christina Schweinberger (AUT)	80
146	Laura Süßemilch (GER)	DNF-2

(United Kingdom) Le Col–Wahoo (DRP)
No.	Rider	Pos.
151	Elizabeth Holden (GBR)	36
152	Eva van Agt (NED)	52
153	Maike van der Duin (NED)	84
154	Marjolein van 't Geloof (NED)	DNS-6
155	Jesse Vandenbulcke (BEL)	83
156	Gladys Verhulst (FRA)	DNF-7

(Netherlands) Parkhotel Valkenburg (PHV)
No.	Rider	Pos.
161	Femke Gerritse (NED)	74
162	Mischa Bredwold (NED)	21
163	Nicole Frain (AUS)	DNF-7
164	Femke Markus (NED)	73
165	Quinty Schoens (NED)	56
166	Anne van Rooijen (NED)	DNF-7

(Netherlands) AG Insurance–NXTG (NXG)
No.	Rider	Pos.
171	Julia Borgström (SWE)	32
172	Anya Louw (AUS)	107
173	Gaia Masetti (ITA)	DNF-2
174	Lone Meertens (BEL)	102
175	Ilse Pruimers (NED)	93
176	Ally Wollaston (NZL)	DNS-3

(France) Arkéa Pro Cycling Team (ARK)
No.	Rider	Pos.
181	Morgane Coston (FRA)	45
182	Pauline Allin (FRA)	95
183	Yuliia Biriukova (UKR)	OTL-7
184	Amandine Fouquenet (FRA)	76
185	Anais Morichon (FRA)	OTL-7
186	Greta Richioud (FRA)	55

(Norway) Uno-X Pro Cycling Team (UXT)
No.	Rider	Pos.
191	Joscelin Lowden (GBR)	47
192	Hannah Barnes (GBR)	100
193	Julie Leth (DEN)	81
194	Hannah Ludwig (GER)	106
195	Mie Bjørndal Ottestad (NOR)	17
196	Anne Dorthe Ysland (NOR)	91

(France) Stade Rochelais Charente-Maritime (SRC)
No.	Rider	Pos.
201	Séverine Eraud (FRA)	51
202	Noémi Abgrall (FRA)	OTL-3
203	India Grangier (FRA)	OTL-7
204	Natalie Grinczer (GBR)	DNF-3
205	Frances Janse van Rensburg (RSA)	OTL-3
206	Maeva Squiban (FRA)	DNF-3

(France) St. Michel–Auber93 (AUB)
No.	Rider	Pos.
211	Simone Boilard (CAN)	71
212	Alison Avoine (FRA)	108
213	Sandrine Bideau (FRA)	87
214	Coralie Demay (FRA)	24
215	Barbara Fonseca (FRA)	85
216	Margot Pompanon (FRA)	82

(Switzerland) Roland Cogeas Edelweiss Squad (CGS)
No.	Rider	Pos.
221	Tamara Dronova	15
222	Caroline Baur (SUI)	92
223	Hannah Buch (GER)	DNF-3
224	Rotem Gafinovitz (ISR)	101
225	Petra Stiasny (SUI)	OTL-1
226	Olga Zabelinskaya (UZB)	97

(United States) Human Powered Health (HPW)
No.	Rider	Pos.
231	Henrietta Christie (NZL)	59
232	Nina Buijsman (NED)	25
233	Antri Christoforou (CYP)	70
234	Barbara Malcotti (ITA)	DSQ-5
235	Marit Raaijmakers (NED)	63
236	Lily Williams (USA)	98

=== By nationality ===
Country	No. of riders	Finished	Stage wins
Australia	8	6	
Austria	2	2	
Belgium	8	7	
Canada	3	3	
Colombia	1	1	
Cuba	1	1	
Cyprus	1	1	
Denmark	3	2	1 (Cecilie Uttrup Ludwig)
France	25	19	
Germany	8	5	
Great Britain	6	4	
Israel	1	1	
Italy	17	10	
Luxembourg	1	1	
Netherlands	28	24	6 (Lorena Wiebes x2, Marianne Vos x2, Annemiek van Vleuten x2)
New Zealand	2	1	
Norway	2	2	
Poland	2	1	
Slovenia	2	1	
South Africa	3	1	
Spain	4	4	
Sweden	1	1	
Switzerland	5	3	1 (Marlen Reusser)
Ukraine	1	0	
United States	6	5	
Uzbekistan	1	1	
	2	2	
Total	144	109	8
