= 2022 Tour de France Femmes, Stage 1 to Stage 8 =

Cycling race stages

The 2022 Tour de France Femmes, (officially Tour de France Femmes avec Zwift), was the first edition of the current Tour de France Femmes, one of women's cycling's two grand tours. The race started on 24 July and finished on 31 July 2022, and is the 16th event in the 2022 UCI Women's World Tour.

== Overview ==
Stage characteristics
Stage	Date	Course	Distance	Type	Winner
1	24 July	Paris: Tour Eiffel to Champs-Élysées	81.6 km (50.7 mi)	Flat stage	Lorena Wiebes (NED)
2	25 July	Meaux to Provins	136.4 km (84.8 mi)	Hilly stage	Marianne Vos (NED)
3	26 July	Reims to Épernay	133.6 km (83.0 mi)	Hilly stage	Cecilie Uttrup Ludwig (DEN)
4	27 July	Troyes to Bar-sur-Aube	126.8 km (78.8 mi)	Medium-mountain stage	Marlen Reusser (SUI)
5	28 July	Bar-le-Duc to Saint-Dié-des-Vosges	175.6 km (109.1 mi)	Flat stage	Lorena Wiebes (NED)
6	29 July	Saint-Dié-des-Vosges to Rosheim	129.2 km (80.3 mi)	Hilly stage	Marianne Vos (NED)
7	30 July	Sélestat to Le Markstein	127.1 km (79.0 mi)	Mountain stage	Annemiek van Vleuten (NED)
8	31 July	Lure to La Super Planche des Belles Filles	123.3 km (76.6 mi)	Mountain stage	Annemiek van Vleuten (NED)
Total			1,033.6 km (642.2 mi)		

== Classification standings ==
Legend
Denotes the leader of the General classification	Denotes the leader of the Mountains classification
Denotes the leader of the Points classification	Denotes the leader of the Young rider classification
Denotes the leader of the Team classification	Denotes the winner of the Combativity award

== Stage 1 ==
24 July 2022 – Paris (Tour Eiffel) to Champs-Élysées, 81.6 km (50.7 mi)

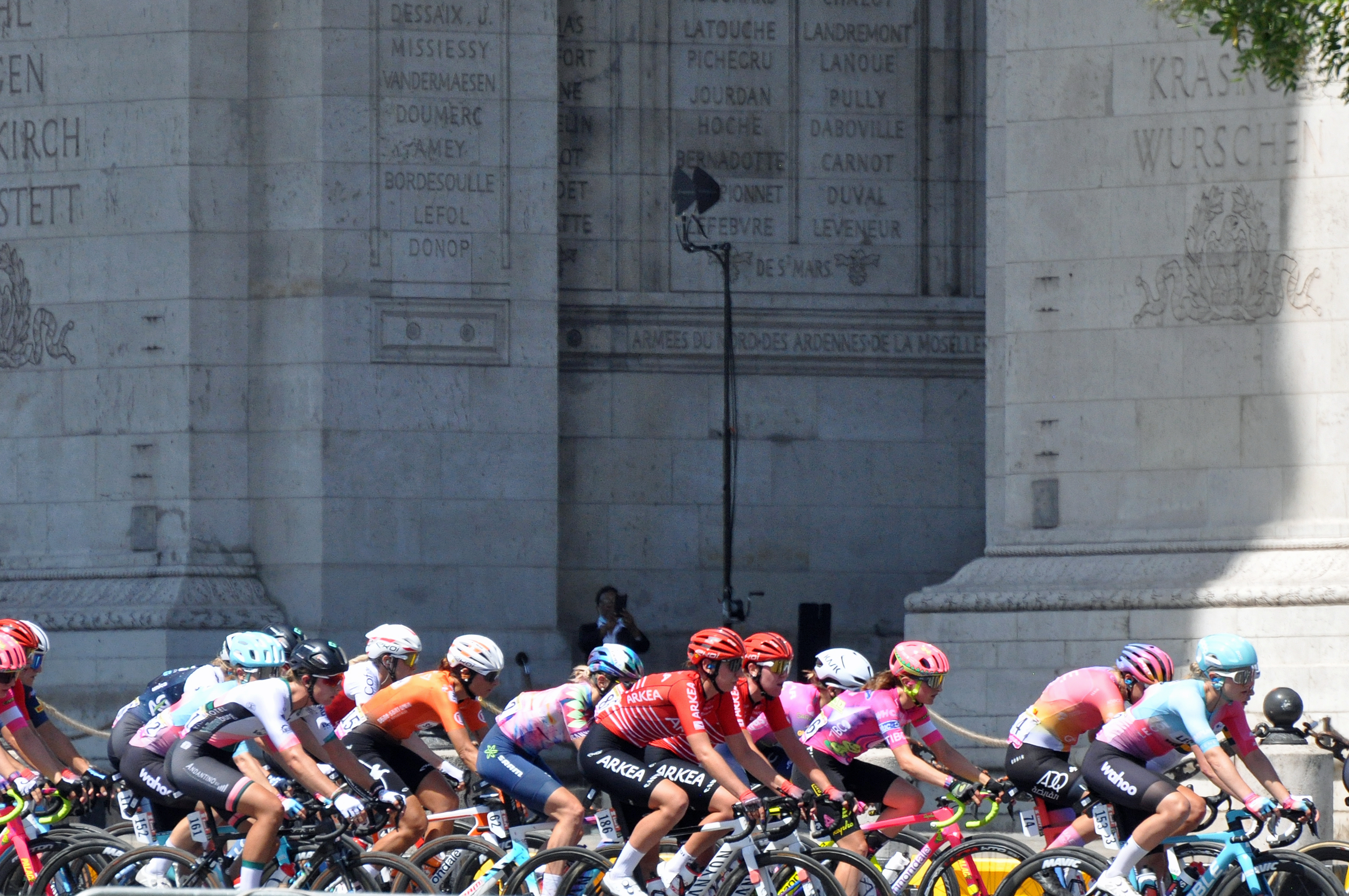
Riders on Stage 1 in Paris

The first stage of the inaugural edition of the Tour de France Femmes took place entirely in Paris, with the riders tackling 11 laps of a circuit around the Champs-Élysées. The circuit is identical to the one tackled by the men's peloton during the final stage of the Tour. There were two intermediate sprints situated after 34.8 kilometres (21.6 mi) and 55.2 kilometres (34.3 mi) of racing. With 19.2 kilometres (11.9 mi) remaining, there was a short climb that was categorized as a fourth-category climb.

The start of the stage was marked by multiple attacks as several riders tried to get into the break. For the first half of the stage, there were several situations where a solo rider or a group of riders built a small gap before the peloton brought them back. As the riders reached the first intermediate sprint, Marianne Vos (Team Jumbo–Visma) passed through ahead of Lorena Wiebes (Team DSM) to take the provisional lead in the points classification. Shortly after, Pauline Allin (Arkéa–B&B Hotels Women) built a lead of around half a minute. After a few kilometres of being solo at the front, she would soon be joined by Henrietta Christie (Human Powered Health), but both riders were caught just before the second intermediate sprint. At the sprint, Vos and Wiebes did not contest for the points, with Lotte Kopecky (SD Worx) taking maximum points ahead of Alexandra Manly (Team BikeExchange–Jayco).

Shortly after the second intermediate sprint, a trio of riders, Marta Lach (Ceratizit–WNT Pro Cycling), Femke Markus (Parkhotel Valkenburg), and Anne Dorthe Ysland (Uno-X Pro Cycling Team), escaped from the peloton. At the first categorised climb of the race, Markus got to the top first to take the first polka-dot jersey as the leader of the Queen of the Mountains (QoM) classification. The lead trio were caught shortly after the climb. With 17 kilometres (11 mi) left, Gladys Verhulst (Le Col–Wahoo) attacked from the peloton. She built a lead of around 40 seconds as the sprinters' teams were not in a hurry to catch her. 13 kilometres (8.1 mi) from the finish, Christine Majerus (SD Worx) and Alana Castrique (Cofidis) went down in a crash. Although Majerus got back on her bike, Castrique abandoned the race. There was another crash involving Amanda Spratt (Team BikeExchange–Jayco) and Laura Süßemilch (Plantur–Pura) but neither rider was seriously injured. As the riders headed towards the finish, Verhulst's lead quickly decreased until she was caught with less than 2 kilometres (1.2 mi) to go.

The stage win was decided by a sprint, with Anna Henderson (Team Jumbo–Visma) leading it out. In the sprint, Wiebes and Vos went head-to-head, with Wiebes edging out Vos to win the sprint and take the first maillot jaune of the race. Aside from leading the general classification (GC), Wiebes also took the first green jersey as the leader of the points classification.

Stage 1 Result
Rank	Rider	Team	Time
1	Lorena Wiebes (NED)	Team DSM	1h 54' 00"
2	Marianne Vos (NED)	Team Jumbo–Visma	+ 0"
3	Lotte Kopecky (BEL)	SD Worx	+ 0"
4	Rachele Barbieri (ITA)	Liv Racing Xstra	+ 0"
5	Emma Norsgaard (DEN)	Movistar Team	+ 0"
6	Maike van der Duin (NED)	Le Col–Wahoo	+ 0"
7	Elisa Balsamo (ITA)	Trek–Segafredo	+ 0"
8	Simone Boilard (CAN)	St. Michel–Auber93	+ 0"
9	Tamara Dronova	Roland Cogeas Edelweiss Squad	+ 0"
10	Vittoria Guazzini (ITA)	FDJ Suez Futuroscope	+ 0"

General classification after Stage 1
Rank	Rider	Team	Time
1	Lorena Wiebes (NED)	Team DSM	1h 53' 50"
2	Marianne Vos (NED)	Team Jumbo–Visma	+ 4"
3	Lotte Kopecky (BEL)	SD Worx	+ 6"
4	Rachele Barbieri (ITA)	Liv Racing Xstra	+ 10"
5	Emma Norsgaard (DEN)	Movistar Team	+ 10"
6	Maike van der Duin (NED)	Le Col–Wahoo	+ 10"
7	Elisa Balsamo (ITA)	Trek–Segafredo	+ 10"
8	Simone Boilard (CAN)	St. Michel–Auber93	+ 10"
9	Tamara Dronova	Roland Cogeas Edelweiss Squad	+ 10"
10	Vittoria Guazzini (ITA)	FDJ Suez Futuroscope	+ 10"

== Stage 2 ==
25 July 2022 – Meaux to Provins, 136.4 km (84.8 mi)

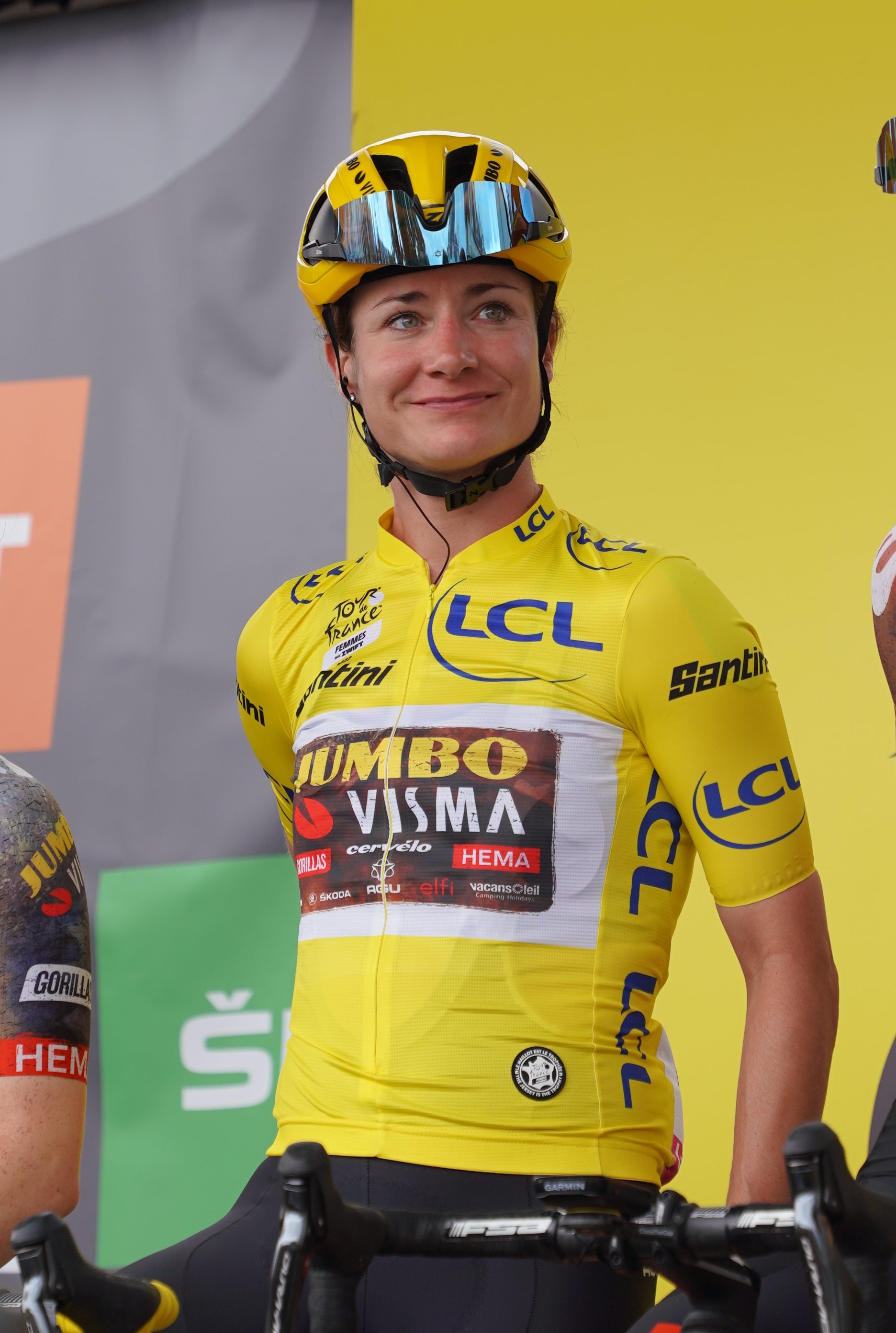
Winner of stage 2, Marianne Vos

The second stage took the riders from Meaux to Provins for a mostly flat stage that featured a few lumps. After 16.9 kilometres (10.5 mi), the riders tackled the only categorised climb of the day, the fourth-category Côte de Tigeaux. Afterwards, the riders made their way towards Provins, with the riders travelling on a mostly flat terrain for the next 100 kilometres (62 mi). With 19.7 kilometres (12.2 mi) left, the riders passed through the finish line for the first time, with the line acting as an intermediate sprint on this occasion. The riders then looped around before making their way back towards the finish line. The finish of the stage was slightly uphill, with the final kilometre averaging 4 percent.

As soon as the stage started, a group of four riders, Sabrina Stultiens (Liv Racing Xstra), Femke Gerritse (Parkhotel Valkenburg), Rotem Gafinovitz (Roland Cogeas Edelweiss Squad), and Marit Raaijmakers (Human Powered Health), managed to build a gap over the peloton. The quartet contested the QoM points on Côte de Tigeaux, with Gerritse taking maximum points to match the total of Femke Markus (Parkhotel Valkenburg), the current QoM leader. The break extended their advantage to around two minutes as Team DSM controlled the gap. Their advantage gradually decreased until they were caught with around 80 kilometres (50 mi) to go. As the riders rode on the flat part of the stage, the peloton went on a steady pace, with no riders attacking. In the final 30 kilometres (19 mi), the stage was marked by multiple crashes, with several riders going down at separate times. The biggest victim of these crashes was Marta Cavalli (FDJ Suez Futuroscope), one of the favourites for the maillot jaune. Although she managed to get back on her bike, she eventually had to abandon the race.

With 27 kilometres (17 mi) to go, Maike van der Duin (Le Col–Wahoo), the leader of the young riders classification, attacked from the peloton. She went on to take maximum points at the intermediate sprint while Lorena Wiebes (Team DSM) led the peloton across to take the remaining maximum points. As Elisa Balsamo (Trek–Segafredo) set the pace in the peloton, a split occurred behind her, with five riders including herself going clear. Balsamo, Marianne Vos (Team Jumbo–Visma), Katarzyna Niewiadoma (Canyon//SRAM), Elisa Longo Borghini (Trek–Segafredo), and Silvia Persico (Valcar–Travel & Service) bridged up to van der Duin, with the sextet gradually increasing their gap on the peloton. As the lead group neared the flamme rouge, Balsamo was dropped after having worked for Longo Borghini.

In the final sprint, Niewiadoma launched her sprint first but Vos went around her to win the stage. Persico finished in second, ahead of Niewiadoma, while Longo Borghini took fourth, two seconds behind. With Wiebes leading the peloton across at 29 seconds down, Vos took the maillot jaune as well as the green jersey.

Stage 2 Result
Rank	Rider	Team	Time
1	Marianne Vos (NED)	Team Jumbo–Visma	3h 14' 02"
2	Silvia Persico (ITA)	Valcar–Travel & Service	+ 0"
3	Katarzyna Niewiadoma (POL)	Canyon//SRAM	+ 0"
4	Elisa Longo Borghini (ITA)	Trek–Segafredo	+ 2"
5	Maike van der Duin (NED)	Le Col–Wahoo	+ 12"
6	Lorena Wiebes (NED)	Team DSM	+ 29"
7	Julie de Wilde (BEL)	Plantur–Pura	+ 29"
8	Rachele Barbieri (ITA)	Liv Racing Xstra	+ 29"
9	Lotte Kopecky (BEL)	SD Worx	+ 29"
10	Maria Giulia Confalonieri (ITA)	Ceratizit–WNT Pro Cycling	+ 29"

General classification after Stage 2
Rank	Rider	Team	Time
1	Marianne Vos (NED)	Team Jumbo–Visma	5h 07' 46"
2	Silvia Persico (ITA)	Valcar–Travel & Service	+ 10"
3	Katarzyna Niewiadoma (POL)	Canyon//SRAM	+ 12"
4	Elisa Longo Borghini (ITA)	Trek–Segafredo	+ 18"
5	Maike van der Duin (NED)	Le Col–Wahoo	+ 28"
6	Lorena Wiebes (NED)	Team DSM	+ 35"
7	Lotte Kopecky (BEL)	SD Worx	+ 41"
8	Rachele Barbieri (ITA)	Liv Racing Xstra	+ 45"
9	Julie de Wilde (BEL)	Plantur–Pura	+ 45"
10	Demi Vollering (NED)	SD Worx	+ 45"

== Stage 3 ==
26 July 2022 – Reims to Épernay, 133.6 km (83.0 mi)

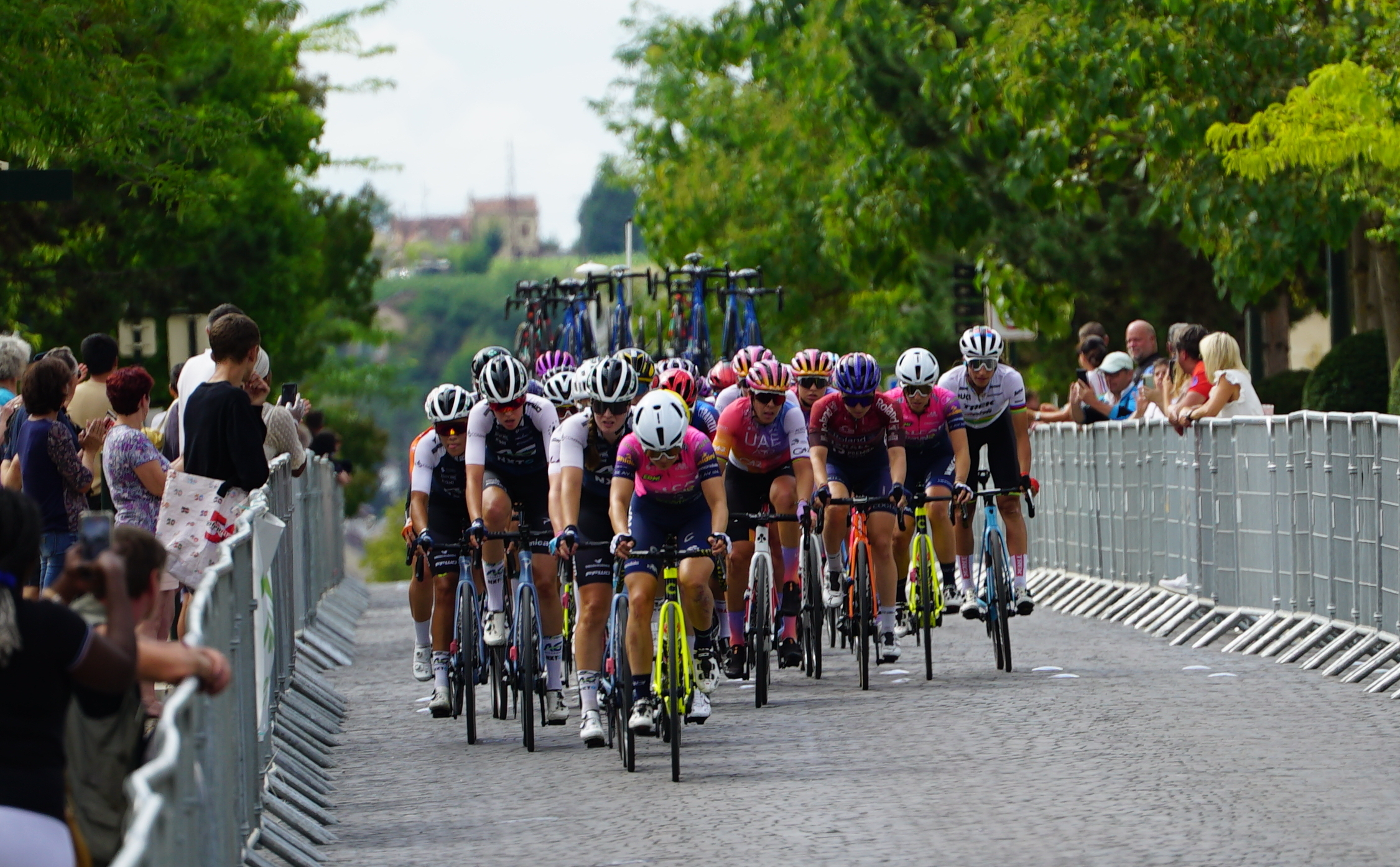
Peloton in Épernay

The third stage featured a rolling terrain that took the riders from Reims to Épernay. The first 86.5 kilometres (53.7 mi) of the stage were mostly flat, with the riders tackling the fourth-category climbs of Côte de Trépail and Côte de Vertus after 21.6 kilometres (13.4 mi) and 78.9 kilometres (49.0 mi), respectively. The final 47.1 kilometres (29.3 mi) featured several short climbs on the way to the finish. After climbing the fourth-category Côte du Mesnil-sur-Oger, the riders rode on an undulating part of the route before crossing the finish line in Épernay for the first time with 24.2 kilometres (15.0 mi) left. Shortly after passing through the intermediate sprint at 21 kilometres (13 mi) from the finish, the riders went up the third-category Côte de Mutigny, a 900-metre (3,000 ft) climb with an average gradient of 12.2 percent. The climb was crested with 15.8 kilometres (9.8 mi) remaining. A short flat section led the riders to the climb of Mont Bernon, which is 1 kilometre (0.62 mi) long with an average gradient of 4.6 percent. At the top, 3.9 kilometres (2.4 mi) from the finish, 3, 2, and 1 bonus seconds were offered to the first three riders across. A short descent led the riders back to the finish in Épernay, with the last 500 metres (1,600 ft) averaging 8 percent.

The first part of the stage featured several attacks as riders tried to establish a breakaway. At one point, the maillot jaune, Marianne Vos (Team Jumbo–Visma), and Ellen van Dijk (Trek–Segafredo) were involved in separate moves but they were not able to break away. On the first three categorised climbs on the stage, Femke Gerritse (Parkhotel Valkenburg) took maximum points to take the lead in the QoM classification. As the riders travelled on the flat part of the stage, Femke Markus (Parkhotel Valkenburg) and Pauline Allin (Arkéa Pro Cycling Team) got a gap over the peloton. However, they only held an advantage of around half a minute before they were reeled in with 74 kilometres (46 mi) to go. After the riders climbed the Côte du Mesnil-sur-Oger, Alena Amialiusik (Canyon//SRAM) attacked from the peloton. Letizia Borghesi (EF Education–Tibco–SVB), Mischa Bredewold (Parkhotel Valkenburg), and Maria Giulia Confalonieri (Ceratizit–WNT Pro Cycling) tried to bridge up to her at separate times but they were unable to do so and they were reeled in one by one. Amialiusik led by almost a minute as she took maximum points at the intermediate sprint.

As the riders approached the climb of Côte de Mutigny, Amialiusik's advantage gradually decreased until she was caught right at the bottom of the climb. The peloton split on the climb, with a select group of seven riders containing most of the GC contenders going off the front at the top. On the descent, Liane Lippert (Team DSM) and Demi Vollering (SD Worx) went down in the front group. Although Vollering managed to get back to a chase group, which included Vos, Lippert lost almost a minute and dropped back to a third chase group. With 6.8 kilometres (4.2 mi) left, the first chase group caught up with the lead group, making it 11 riders out front. On the climb of Mont Bernon, Katarzyna Niewiadoma (Canyon//SRAM) and Elisa Longo Borghini (Trek–Segafredo) increased the pace as they fought for the bonus seconds, with Longo Borghini edging out Niewiadoma. The pace dropped Kristen Faulkner (Team BikeExchange–Jayco) as well as Annemiek van Vleuten (Movistar Team), the main pre-race favourite. On the short descent, van Vleuten gradually reeled herself back to the lead group to contest for the stage win.

In the sprint, Niewiadoma launched her sprint with around 300 metres (980 ft) to go, with Vos immediately following her wheel. From behind them, Cecilie Uttrup Ludwig (FDJ Suez Futuroscope) surged ahead to immediately build a two-second gap, holding off Vos to win the stage. Vollering lost eight seconds in the sprint while van Vleuten finished 20 seconds down. Vos kept the maillot jaune, extending her advantage to 16 seconds over Silvia Persico (Valcar–Travel & Service), who was also in the lead group, and Niewiadoma.

Stage 3 Result
Rank	Rider	Team	Time
1	Cecilie Uttrup Ludwig (DEN)	FDJ Suez Futuroscope	3h 22' 54"
2	Marianne Vos (NED)	Team Jumbo–Visma	+ 2"
3	Ashleigh Moolman (RSA)	SD Worx	+ 2"
4	Silvia Persico (ITA)	Valcar–Travel & Service	+ 2"
5	Elisa Longo Borghini (ITA)	Trek–Segafredo	+ 2"
6	Katarzyna Niewiadoma (POL)	Canyon//SRAM	+ 2"
7	Mavi García (ESP)	UAE Team ADQ	+ 6"
8	Demi Vollering (NED)	SD Worx	+ 8"
9	Juliette Labous (FRA)	Team DSM	+ 11"
10	Annemiek van Vleuten (NED)	Movistar Team	+ 20"

General classification after Stage 3
Rank	Rider	Team	Time
1	Marianne Vos (NED)	Team Jumbo–Visma	8h 30' 36"
2	Silvia Persico (ITA)	Valcar–Travel & Service	+ 16"
3	Katarzyna Niewiadoma (POL)	Canyon//SRAM	+ 16"
4	Elisa Longo Borghini (ITA)	Trek–Segafredo	+ 21"
5	Ashleigh Moolman (RSA)	SD Worx	+ 51"
6	Mavi García (ESP)	UAE Team ADQ	+ 55"
7	Demi Vollering (NED)	SD Worx	+ 57"
8	Juliette Labous (FRA)	Team DSM	+ 1' 05"
9	Annemiek van Vleuten (NED)	Movistar Team	+ 1' 14"
10	Cecilie Uttrup Ludwig (DEN)	FDJ Suez Futuroscope	+ 1' 48"

== Stage 4 ==
27 July 2022 – Troyes to Bar-sur-Aube, 126.8 km (78.8 mi)

For the fourth stage of the Tour, the riders travelled through a hilly parcours that featured four sectors of gravel (chemin blanc) in the final half of the stage. The first 67 kilometres (42 mi) were flat, with the riders passing through the intermediate sprint in Bar-sur-Seine after 60.4 kilometres (37.5 mi). After cresting the third-category Côte de Celles-sur-Ource with 58.7 kilometres (36.5 mi) remaining, the riders immediately rode through the first sector of gravel, the Chemin blanc de Celles, which is 2.3 kilometres (1.4 mi) in length. After a descent and a short flat section, the riders climbed up the third-category Côte du Val des Clos before immediately going through the second gravel sector, the Chemin blanc des Hautes Forêts, which is 3.2 kilometres (2.0 mi) long. Around 8.7 kilometres (5.4 mi) after this sector, the riders tackled the next sector of gravel, the 4.4-kilometre (2.7 mi) long Chemin blanc du plateau de Blu, which is gradually uphill. After tackling the fourth-category Côte de Maître Jean with 28.2 kilometres (17.5 mi) to go, a short descent and flat section led to the fourth-category Côte de Vitry. Immediately afterwards, the riders went through the final gravel sector, the 3-kilometre (1.9 mi) long Chemin blanc de Vitry, with the sector ending with 17.4 kilometres (10.8 mi) left. Another short flat section led to the back-to-back climbs of Côte des Bergères, which featured bonus seconds at the top, and the fourth-category Côte du Val Perdu, which was crested with 5.1 kilometres (3.2 mi) to go. A short descent and flat section led to the finish in Bar-sur-Aube.

The first part of the stage featured attempts from riders who tried to get into the break. Eventually, after 43 kilometres (27 mi), a group containing Coralie Demay (St. Michel–Auber93), Laura Asencio (Ceratizit–WNT Pro Cycling), and Valerie Demey (Liv Racing Xstra) escaped from the peloton. The break built a maximum advantage of around two and a half minutes as the peloton maintained a steady tempo. On the first gravel sector, Demey was dropped from the front group while the peloton began to diminish in number. On the descent, Asencio distanced Demay but the latter came back to the former's wheel. On the second climb, the Côte du Val des Clos, Demay dropped Asencio, with the peloton hovering at around a minute down. The peloton continued to decrease Demay's advantage, closing in on her on the second gravel sector. However, back on the tarmac, the peloton slowed down, allowing Demay to increase her advantage again.

On the third chemin blanc sector, the peloton finally caught Demay. Midway through the sector, Cecilie Uttrup Ludwig (FDJ Suez Futuroscope) and Mavi García (UAE Team ADQ), two riders in the top ten, suffered from punctures, with the latter having to stop twice. Katarzyna Niewiadoma (Canyon//SRAM) also had to change her bike after riding through the sector. All three riders would eventually get back to the peloton. With 23.1 kilometres (14.4 mi) remaining, Marlen Reusser (SD Worx) attacked from the peloton, quickly attaining an advantage of around half a minute. On the fourth sector, Niewiadoma tried to lift the pace but no one was dropped. Elisa Longo Borghini (Trek–Segafredo) and Annemiek van Vleuten (Movistar Team) also suffered from mechanicals on this sector but both riders were able to get back to the peloton. Meanwhile, Garcia changed her bike for a third time. As she was trying to get back, she was hit by her team car, causing her to go down. She would get back on her bike but she would lose around a minute and a half at the end of the day.

Following the last gravel sector, Reusser's advantage ballooned to more than a minute as the peloton slowed down. In the final 15 kilometres (9.3 mi), Alena Amialiusik (Canyon//SRAM), Évita Muzic (FDJ Suez Futuroscope), and Veronica Ewers (EF Education–Tibco–SVB) formed a chase group in pursuit of Reusser. However, they continued to lose time to Reusser, who eventually powered to a solo stage win. The chasing trio finished 1' 24" down while Marianne Vos (Team Jumbo–Visma), who kept the maillot jaune, led the reduced peloton across at 1' 40" down. The only change in the top ten on GC was Garcia dropping out after her mechanicals and crash, with Elise Chabbey (Canyon//SRAM) entering the top ten as a result.

Stage 4 Result
Rank	Rider	Team	Time
1	Marlen Reusser (SUI)	SD Worx	3h 16' 30"
2	Évita Muzic (FRA)	FDJ Suez Futuroscope	+ 1' 24"
3	Alena Amialiusik	Canyon//SRAM	+ 1' 24"
4	Veronica Ewers (USA)	EF Education–Tibco–SVB	+ 1' 24"
5	Marianne Vos (NED)	Team Jumbo–Visma	+ 1' 40"
6	Lotte Kopecky (BEL)	SD Worx	+ 1' 40"
7	Silvia Persico (ITA)	Valcar–Travel & Service	+ 1' 40"
8	Ruby Roseman-Gannon (AUS)	Team BikeExchange–Jayco	+ 1' 40"
9	Elisa Longo Borghini (ITA)	Trek–Segafredo	+ 1' 40"
10	Demi Vollering (NED)	SD Worx	+ 1' 40"

General classification after Stage 4
Rank	Rider	Team	Time
1	Marianne Vos (NED)	Team Jumbo–Visma	11h 48' 46"
2	Silvia Persico (ITA)	Valcar–Travel & Service	+ 16"
3	Katarzyna Niewiadoma (POL)	Canyon//SRAM	+ 16"
4	Elisa Longo Borghini (ITA)	Trek–Segafredo	+ 21"
5	Ashleigh Moolman (RSA)	SD Worx	+ 51"
6	Demi Vollering (NED)	SD Worx	+ 57"
7	Juliette Labous (FRA)	Team DSM	+ 1' 05"
8	Annemiek van Vleuten (NED)	Movistar Team	+ 1' 14"
9	Cecilie Uttrup Ludwig (DEN)	FDJ Suez Futuroscope	+ 1' 48"
10	Elise Chabbey (SUI)	Canyon//SRAM	+ 2' 20"

== Stage 5 ==
28 July 2022 – Bar-le-Duc to Saint-Dié-des-Vosges, 175.6 km (109.1 mi)

The fifth stage is the longest of the Women's WorldTour calendar, at 175.6 kilometres (109.1 mi). It featured a mostly flat parcours that was expected to suit the sprinters. There were a few lumps on the route as well as the fourth-category climbs of Côte de Pagny-la-Blanche-Côte and Côte de Gripport after 61.4 kilometres (38.2 mi) and 105.5 kilometres (65.6 mi) of racing, respectively. Following the second categorized climb, the riders passed through the intermediate sprint in Charmes with 61.5 kilometres (38.2 mi) left. After a long flat section, the riders went up the short climb of Col du Haut du Bois, which was crested with 20.4 kilometres (12.7 mi) to go. There were bonus seconds on offer to the first three riders at the top. A short descent and flat section led to the finish in Saint-Dié-des-Vosges.

Around 16 kilometres (9.9 mi) after the stage's official start, there was an attack by Emily Newsom (EF Education–Tibco–SVB) and Anya Louw (AG Insurance–NXTG). After a few kilometers, Antri Christoforou (Human Powered Health) and Victoire Berteau (Cofidis) bridged up to the duo up front, making it four riders in the break. The quartet extended their advantage to around three and a half minutes before Team DSM set the tempo in the peloton. Over the next part of the stage, the break's lead gradually decreased as more teams went to the front of the peloton. With around 45 kilometres (28 mi) left, a crash took several riders in the peloton. The biggest victim of the crash was Emma Norsgaard (Movistar Team), who had to withdraw from the race. 21 kilometres (13 mi) from the finish, with the peloton at around a minute down, Berteau attacked from the break, dropping Newsom and Louw. The lead pair continued to work together as the peloton came to within half a minute of the duo. However, the peloton reeled them in inside the final 3 kilometres (1.9 mi).

With around 1.5 kilometres (0.93 mi) remaining, there was a crash that involved Elise Chabbey (SD Worx), who was in the top ten on GC, causing her to finish a minute and a half down. In the final kilometer, as Trek–Segafredo was setting up their train for Elisa Balsamo, their GC leader, Elisa Longo Borghini, went the wrong way. She immediately turned around, but she initially lost nine seconds. With both of these events happening in the final 3 kilometres (1.9 mi), they were given the same time as the peloton. In the finale, Lorena Wiebes launched her sprint first and no one would get close to her as she took her second stage win. Balsamo took second while Marianne Vos (Team Jumbo–Visma) finished third. In the GC, Vos kept the maillot jaune, extending her advantage to 20 seconds due to bonus seconds. There were no other changes in the top ten, or the classifications.

Stage 5 Result
Rank	Rider	Team	Time
1	Lorena Wiebes (NED)	Team DSM	4h 32' 16"
2	Elisa Balsamo (ITA)	Trek–Segafredo	+ 0"
3	Marianne Vos (NED)	Team Jumbo–Visma	+ 0"
4	Rachele Barbieri (ITA)	Liv Racing Xstra	+ 0"
5	Maike van der Duin (NED)	Le Col–Wahoo	+ 0"
6	Maria Giulia Confalonieri (ITA)	Ceratizit–WNT Pro Cycling	+ 0"
7	Silvia Persico (ITA)	Valcar–Travel & Service	+ 0"
8	Vittoria Guazzini (ITA)	FDJ Suez Futuroscope	+ 0"
9	Tamara Dronova	Roland Cogeas Edelweiss Squad	+ 0"
10	Alexandra Manly (AUS)	Team BikeExchange–Jayco	+ 0"

General classification after Stage 5
Rank	Rider	Team	Time
1	Marianne Vos (NED)	Team Jumbo–Visma	16h 20' 58"
2	Silvia Persico (ITA)	Valcar–Travel & Service	+ 20"
3	Katarzyna Niewiadoma (POL)	Canyon//SRAM	+ 20"
4	Elisa Longo Borghini (ITA)	Trek–Segafredo	+ 25"
5	Ashleigh Moolman (RSA)	SD Worx	+ 55"
6	Demi Vollering (NED)	SD Worx	+ 1' 01"
7	Juliette Labous (FRA)	Team DSM	+ 1' 09"
8	Annemiek van Vleuten (NED)	Movistar Team	+ 1' 18"
9	Cecilie Uttrup Ludwig (DEN)	FDJ Suez Futuroscope	+ 1' 52"
10	Elise Chabbey (SUI)	Canyon//SRAM	+ 2' 24"

== Stage 6 ==
29 July 2022 – Saint-Dié-des-Vosges to Rosheim, 129.2 km (80.3 mi)

The sixth stage of the Tour featured a hilly parcours from Saint-Dié-des-Vosges to Rosheim. After a flat start, the riders went up the fourth-category Col d’Urbeis. Following a descent, the riders travelled on an undulating terrain where they climbed up the fourth-category Côte de Klingenthal and the third-category Côte de Grendelbruch, with the latter climb being crested at around the halfway point of the stage. The descent led to a long flat section where the riders passed through the intermediate sprint at Urmatt with 44.3 kilometres (27.5 mi) left. At the end of the flat section, the riders tackled the climb of Route de Mollkirch, which featured bonus seconds at the top. Following the descent, the riders passed through the finish line in Rosheim for the first time with 20.2 kilometres (12.6 mi) left. Afterwards, the riders tackled the fourth-category Côte de Boersch before looping back towards the finish in Rosheim.

The start of the stage was marked by a furious fight for the break. It took around 45 kilometres (28 mi) before a break of 14 riders managed to escape from the peloton. Marta Bastianelli (UAE Team ADQ) tried to bridge up to the lead group but she was eventually reeled in. The break led by as much as two minutes, with Valcar–Travel & Service and UAE Team ADQ controlling the gap. With 62 kilometres (39 mi) left, Joss Lowden (Le Col–Wahoo) accelerated from the break but she was caught shortly after. The break's advantage soon gradually decreased, going down to around a minute where it stabilized for a while. On the descent of Route de Mollkirch, Anna Henderson (Team Jumbo–Visma) and Christine Majerus (SD Worx) attacked from the break but they were quickly caught. In the peloton, on the same descent, there was a crash that involved Lorena Wiebes (Team DSM), Lotte Kopecky (SD Worx), and Alena Amialiusik (Canyon//SRAM). All three would get back on their bike although only Kopecky managed to get back to the peloton.

With around 16 kilometres (9.9 mi) left, the break split as Marie Le Net (FDJ Suez Futuroscope) and Henderson attacked. Lowden joined them shortly after to make it a trio out front. At this point, the peloton was less than a minute down, with Trek–Segafredo setting the pace. The remnants of the break was soon caught as the peloton came closer to catching the lead group. Under 10 kilometres (6.2 mi) from the finish, Le Net dropped Henderson and Lowden. She hovered solo at the front until she was caught by the peloton with around 5 kilometres (3.1 mi) remaining. The stage win came down to a bunch sprint, with Trek–Segafredo leading it out for Elisa Balsamo. In the sprint, the maillot jaune, Marianne Vos (Team Jumbo–Visma) launched with 200 metres (660 ft) to go. She held off Bastianelli and Kopecky to win her second stage of the race. In the GC, Vos extended her advantage due to the ten bonus seconds she gained for the stage win as the race headed towards the mountains.

Stage 6 Result
Rank	Rider	Team	Time
1	Marianne Vos (NED)	Team Jumbo–Visma	3h 09' 26"
2	Marta Bastianelli (ITA)	UAE Team ADQ	+ 0"
3	Lotte Kopecky (BEL)	SD Worx	+ 0"
4	Elisa Balsamo (ITA)	Trek–Segafredo	+ 0"
5	Silvia Persico (ITA)	Valcar–Travel & Service	+ 0"
6	Maria Giulia Confalonieri (ITA)	Ceratizit–WNT Pro Cycling	+ 0"
7	Vittoria Guazzini (ITA)	FDJ Suez Futuroscope	+ 0"
8	Katarzyna Niewiadoma (POL)	Canyon//SRAM	+ 0"
9	Rachele Barbieri (ITA)	Liv Racing Xstra	+ 0"
10	Elisa Longo Borghini (ITA)	Trek–Segafredo	+ 0"

General classification after Stage 6
Rank	Rider	Team	Time
1	Marianne Vos (NED)	Team Jumbo–Visma	19h 30' 14"
2	Silvia Persico (ITA)	Valcar–Travel & Service	+ 30"
3	Katarzyna Niewiadoma (POL)	Canyon//SRAM	+ 30"
4	Elisa Longo Borghini (ITA)	Trek–Segafredo	+ 35"
5	Ashleigh Moolman (RSA)	SD Worx	+ 1' 05"
6	Demi Vollering (NED)	SD Worx	+ 1' 11"
7	Juliette Labous (FRA)	Team DSM	+ 1' 19"
8	Annemiek van Vleuten (NED)	Movistar Team	+ 1' 28"
9	Cecilie Uttrup Ludwig (DEN)	FDJ Suez Futuroscope	+ 2' 02"
10	Elise Chabbey (SUI)	Canyon//SRAM	+ 2' 34"

== Stage 7 ==
30 July 2022 – Sélestat to Le Markstein, 127.1 km (79.0 mi)

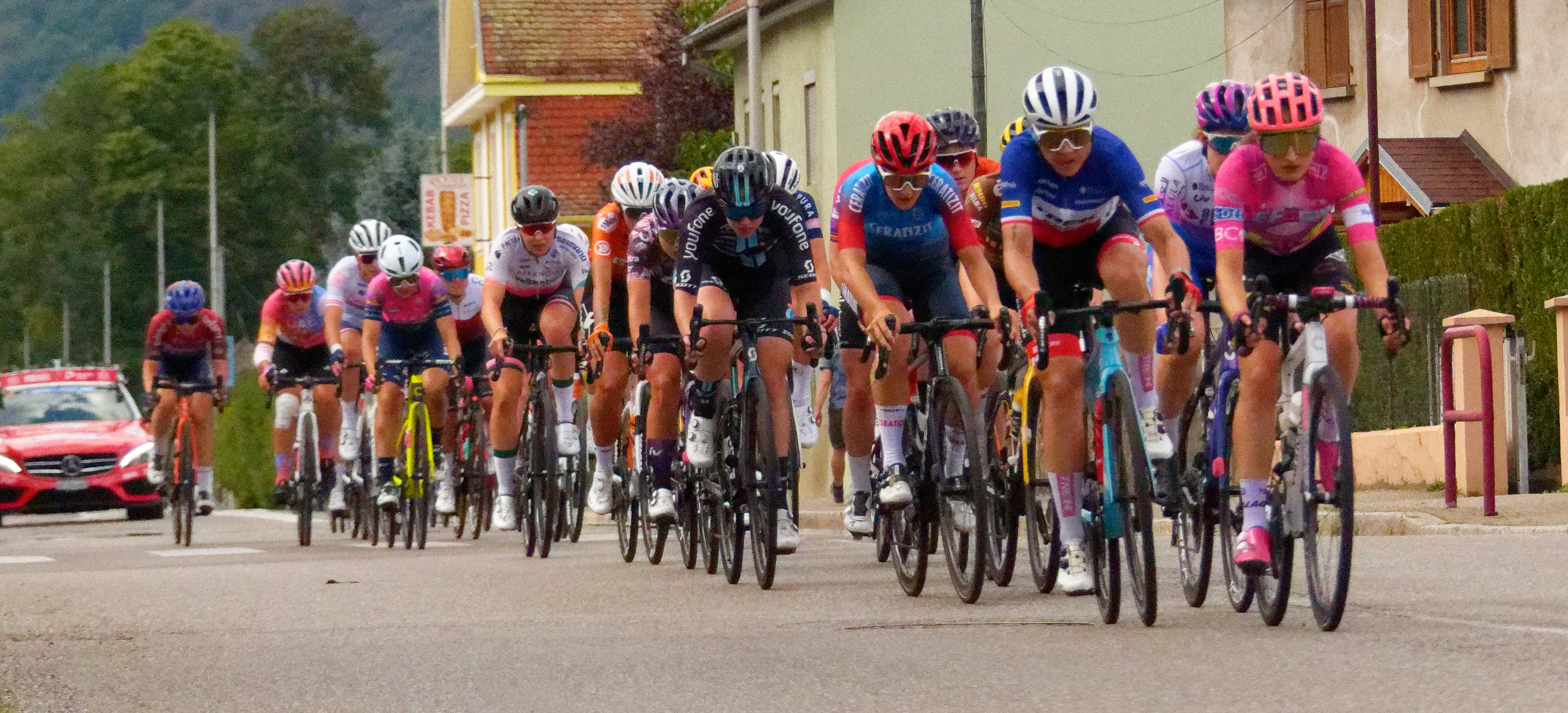
Riders on Stage 7 in Willer-sur-Thur

The seventh stage featured the first mountain stage of the Tour, with the GC contenders expected to come to the fore. The first 39.3 kilometres (24.4 mi) were mostly flat before the riders climbed up the first-category Petit Ballon, a 9.3-kilometre (5.8 mi) climb with an average of 8.1 percent. The descent immediately led to the foot of the first-category Col du Platzerwasel, which is 7.1 kilometres (4.4 mi) long with an average of 8.3 percent. After cresting the top at 61.3 kilometres (38.1 mi) from the finish, the riders travelled on a short plateau section where they passed through the finish line in Le Markstein for the first time. A long, gradual descent and a valley section followed afterwards, with the riders passing through the intermediate sprint in Oderen with 34 kilometres (21 mi) left. With 20.7 kilometres (12.9 mi) remaining, the riders tackled the final climb, the first-category Grand Ballon. The climb is 13.5 kilometres (8.4 mi) long with an average of 6.7 percent and the toughest gradients are located in the final half of the climb. The top was crested with 7.2 kilometres (4.5 mi) left, with the riders facing a plateau section towards the finish in Le Markstein. With 3,000 metres (9,800 ft) of vertical climbing, the stage was considered as the queen stage of the race.

On the flat part ahead of the climbs, a group of 33 riders managed to break away from the peloton. Lorena Wiebes in the green jersey abandoned the race, following injuries from her crash on stage 6. However, the attack was short-lived, and they were caught at the bottom of the first climb, the Petit Ballon. On the climb, the maillot jaune, Marianne Vos (Team Jumbo–Visma), was dropped, ensuring that the jersey would change hands at the end of the day. With 86 kilometres (53 mi) still to go, the race exploded as Annemiek van Vleuten (Movistar Team) launched an attack. Only Demi Vollering (SD Worx) was able to follow her move while a chase group containing most of the other GC contenders formed behind them. Elisa Longo Borghini (Trek–Segafredo) soon went in pursuit of the lead duo but she continued to lose time on the climb. At the top, van Vleuten and Vollering led Longo Borghini by a minute and a half while the chase group were two and a half minutes down at this point.

On the descent of Petit Ballon, Vollering tried to distance van Vleuten, but the latter was able to come back to the former's wheel ahead of the climb of Col du Platzerwasel. On the climb, van Vleuten set the pace at the front, further increasing their lead over the chasers. Around a kilometer from the top, van Vleuten put in an acceleration that dropped Vollering. At the top, van Vleuten increased her advantage over Vollering to around 20 seconds while Longo Borghini was already more than three minutes down at this point. As the riders passed through the finish line for the first time, van Vleuten found herself almost a minute ahead of Vollering. Longo Borghini's deficit increased to four minutes while the chase group, which was composed of Katarzyna Niewiadoma (Canyon//SRAM), Juliette Labous (Team DSM), Silvia Persico (Valcar–Travel & Service), Urška Žigart (Team BikeExchange–Jayco), and the FDJ Suez Futuroscope duo of Cecilie Uttrup Ludwig and Évita Muzic, were already around five and a half minutes down at this point. Over the descent and the valley section before Grand Ballon, van Vleuten continued to increase her lead. Meanwhile, Longo Borghini began to lose ground to the chase group, which was now within a minute of catching the Italian.

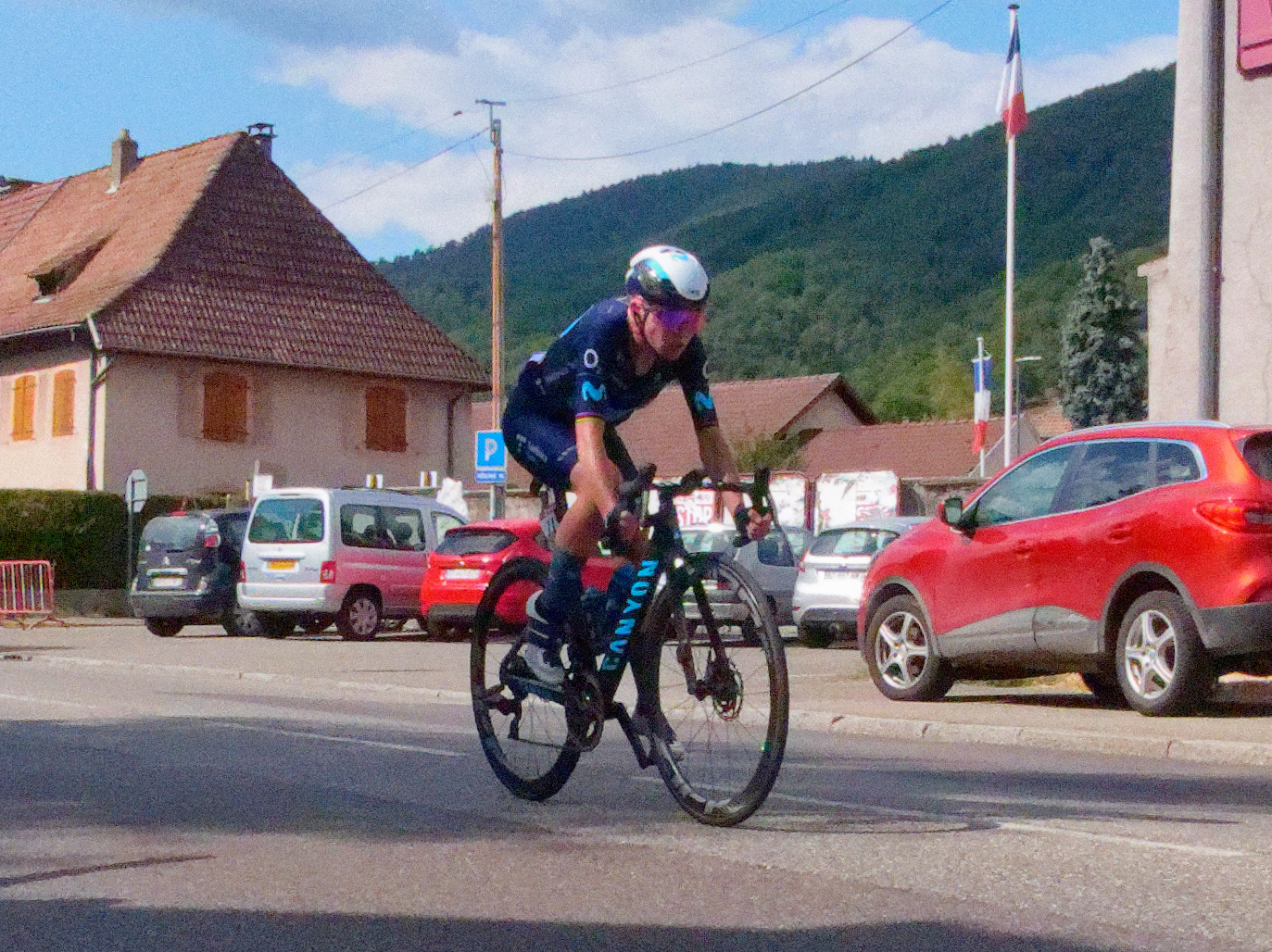
Annemiek van Vleuten on her solo attack for the yellow jersey on stage 7

On the final climb of the Grand Ballon, van Vleuten's lead over Vollering increased to almost four minutes while Longo Borghini was swept up by the chase group. Towards the early parts of the climb, Muzic was dropped from the chase group. As the chase group went on the climb's steeper final half, Niewiadoma, Ludwig, and Labous dropped Longo Borghini, Persico, and Žigart while up front, the gap between van Vleuten and Vollering stabilized. Van Vleuten lost some time to Vollering on the final plateau section, but she nevertheless powered away to a dominant stage win, 3' 26" ahead of Vollering, who took the polka-dot jersey as leader of the QoM classification. Almost two minutes later, Ludwig sprinted to third place, two seconds ahead of Labous and Niewiadoma. Persico and Longo Borghini finished almost seven minutes down, with Žigart finishing a further half a minute behind.

In the GC, van Vleuten took the maillot jaune, more than three minutes ahead of Vollering while Niewiadoma rounded out the podium at four and a half minutes down. Labous, Ludwig, Persico, and Longo Borghini occupied the next four spots, separated by only 53 seconds. With a ninth-place finish on the day, Muzic entered the top ten at more than ten minutes down. Mavi García (UAE Team ADQ) and Elise Chabbey (Canyon//SRAM) rounded out the top ten after finishing in the top 15 on the stage.

Stage 7 Result
Rank	Rider	Team	Time
1	Annemiek van Vleuten (NED)	Movistar Team	3h 47' 02"
2	Demi Vollering (NED)	SD Worx	+ 3' 26"
3	Cecilie Uttrup Ludwig (DEN)	FDJ Suez Futuroscope	+ 5' 16"
4	Juliette Labous (FRA)	Team DSM	+ 5' 18"
5	Katarzyna Niewiadoma (POL)	Canyon//SRAM	+ 5' 18"
6	Silvia Persico (ITA)	Valcar–Travel & Service	+ 6' 56"
7	Elisa Longo Borghini (ITA)	Trek–Segafredo	+ 6' 56"
8	Urška Žigart (SLO)	Team BikeExchange–Jayco	+ 7' 23"
9	Évita Muzic (FRA)	FDJ Suez Futuroscope	+ 8' 27"
10	Pauliena Rooijakkers (NED)	Canyon//SRAM	+ 10' 10"

General classification after Stage 7
Rank	Rider	Team	Time
1	Annemiek van Vleuten (NED)	Movistar Team	23h 18' 31"
2	Demi Vollering (NED)	SD Worx	+ 3' 14"
3	Katarzyna Niewiadoma (POL)	Canyon//SRAM	+ 4' 33"
4	Juliette Labous (FRA)	Team DSM	+ 5' 22"
5	Cecilie Uttrup Ludwig (DEN)	FDJ Suez Futuroscope	+ 5' 59"
6	Silvia Persico (ITA)	Valcar–Travel & Service	+ 6' 11"
7	Elisa Longo Borghini (ITA)	Trek–Segafredo	+ 6' 15"
8	Évita Muzic (FRA)	FDJ Suez Futuroscope	+ 10' 13"
9	Mavi García (ESP)	UAE Team ADQ	+ 12' 06"
10	Elise Chabbey (SWI)	Canyon//SRAM	+ 12' 24"

== Stage 8 ==
31 July 2022 – Lure to La Super Planche des Belles Filles, 123.3 km (76.6 mi)

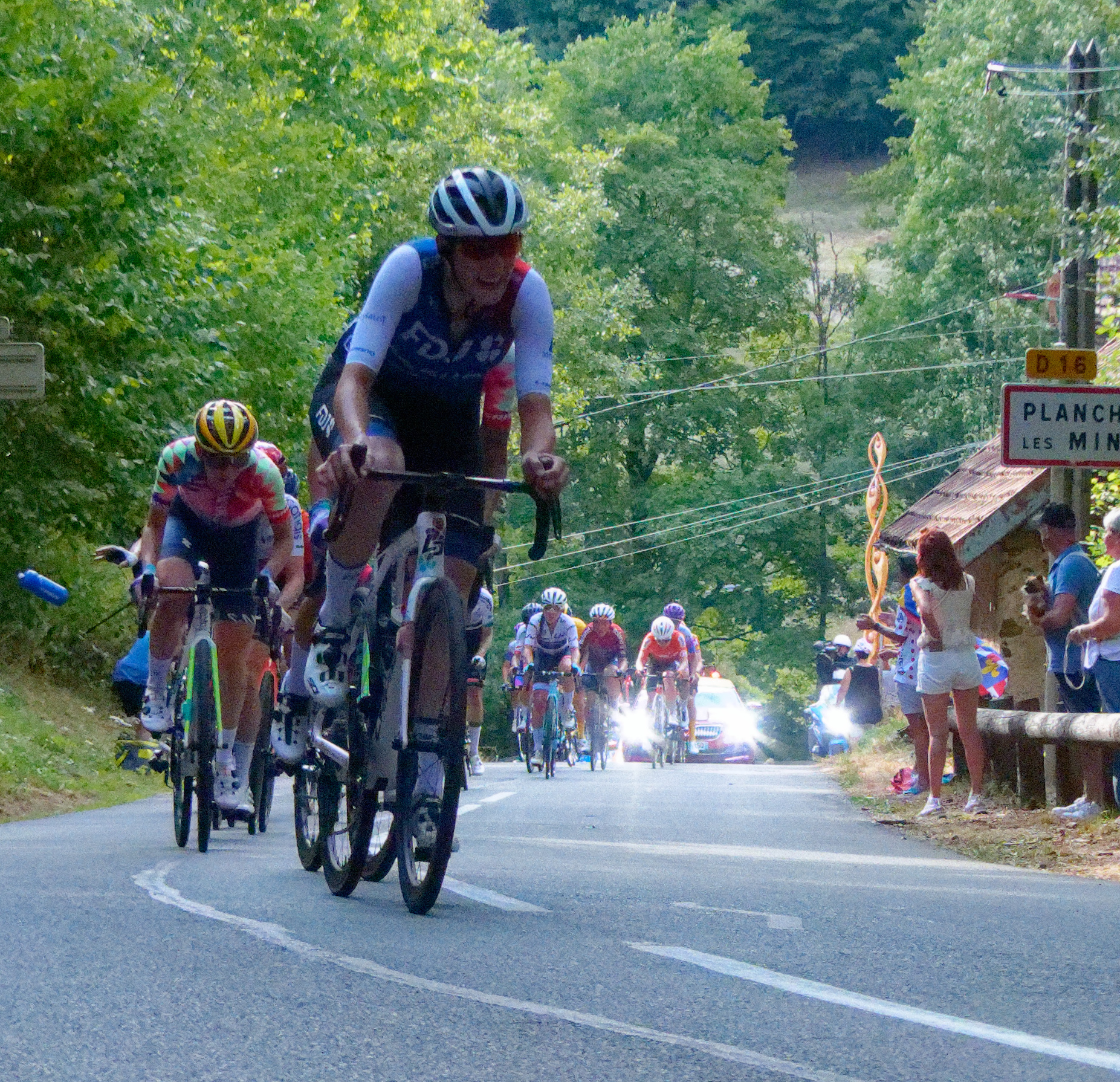
Riders on Stage 8 at Plancher-les-Mines

The final stage of the Tour featured another mountain stage, with the riders finishing atop La Super Planche des Belles Filles. The first 50 kilometres (31 mi) were mostly flat, featuring few lumps as well as the intermediate sprint in Faucogney-et-la-Mer after 47.4 kilometres (29.5 mi). Afterwards, the riders went up the second-category Côte d’Esmoulières, which is only 2.3 kilometres (1.4 mi) long but averages 8.5 percent. At the top, the riders continued on a false flat uphill for around 11 kilometres (6.8 mi) before descending into Le Thillot. A short valley section led to the foot of the first-category Ballon d'Alsace, an 8.7-kilometre (5.4 mi) climb with an average of 6.9 percent. The top was crested with 38.7 kilometres (24.0 mi) remaining. After a descent and a long valley section totalling almost 32 kilometres (20 mi) in length, the riders reached the foot of the final climb, the first-category La Super Planche des Belles Filles. The climb is 7 kilometres (4.3 mi) long with an average of 8.7 percent. Much like stage 7 of the men's edition, the final kilometer featured the extended gravel section where the gradients rise to as high as 24 percent near the finish.

The start of the stage was marked by several attacks as riders attempted to get into the break. As the riders went up the first climb, the Côte d’Esmoulières, no break had been established yet. As a result, Demi Vollering (SD Worx) took maximum points at the top to extend her lead in the QoM classification. Just after the climb, with 69 kilometres (43 mi) to go, Leah Thomas (Trek–Segafredo) and Pauliena Rooijakkers (Canyon//SRAM) attacked. They were joined by eight other riders to make it ten riders in the break. Among the riders in the break were Mavi García (UAE Team ADQ) and Elise Chabbey (Canyon//SRAM), two riders in the top ten on GC. Several chase groups formed behind them, with a chasing quartet eventually bridging up to the lead group. However, the break was kept on a tight leash with their advantage hovering at around a minute and a half.

With 57 kilometres (35 mi) to go, the maillot jaune, Annemiek van Vleuten (Movistar Team), suffered a mechanical. SD Worx and Trek–Segafredo soon lifted the pace in the peloton, with van Vleuten being forced to chase a deficit of almost a minute. After a while, van Vleuten eventually made it back to the peloton right at the foot of the second climb, the Ballon d'Alsace. On the climb, van Vleuten made four more bike changes but she quickly made it back to the peloton each time. At the top, García led the break across with an advantage of around a minute on the peloton. On the valley section before the final climb, the peloton slowed down, allowing the break to increase their lead to almost two minutes. Thomas soon dropped back from the break to pace the peloton, gradually decreasing the break's advantage. As the riders made it to the foot of La Super Planche des Belles Filles, the break's lead was down to around 20 seconds.

On the climb, the break fractured as Rooijakkers launched an attack. García rode in close proximity before eventually passing and dropping Rooijakkers. With 6 kilometres (3.7 mi) remaining, van Vleuten attacked from the peloton. She passed the remnants of the break while Vollering went in pursuit of the race leader. Much like the previous day, a chase group composed of Katarzyna Niewiadoma (Canyon//SRAM), Juliette Labous (Team DSM), Silvia Persico (Valcar–Travel & Service), Elisa Longo Borghini (Trek–Segafredo), Veronica Ewers (EF Education–EasyPost), and Cecilie Uttrup Ludwig (FDJ Suez Futuroscope) formed behind the duo. Van Vleuten gradually extended her lead over Vollering towards the finish as she took her second successive stage win, sealing the Tour title in the process. Vollering finished 30 seconds down while also confirming her win in the QoM classification. Persico took third at 1' 43" down while the rest of the chase group scattered across the line within 30 seconds of Persico. Meanwhile, Ludwig was dropped from the chase group as she finished almost three minutes behind.

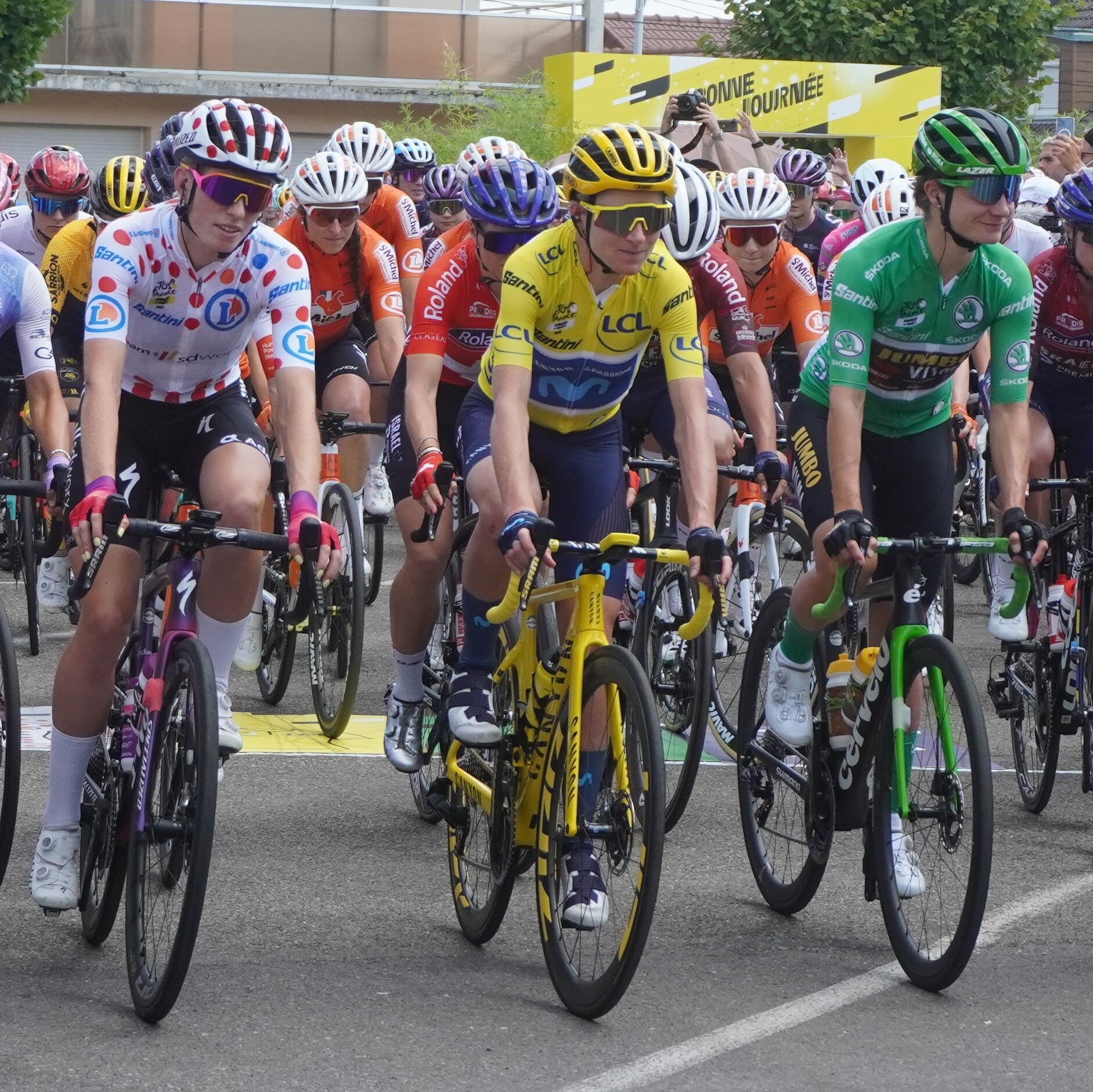
Annemiek van Vleuten in the yellow jersey (centre), Marianne Vos in the green jersey (right) and Demi Vollering in the polka dot jersey (left)

In the final GC classification, Annemiek van Vleuten (Movistar Team) won the Tour de France Femmes with an advantage over Demi Vollering (SD Worx) of almost four minutes, with Vollering winning the mountains classification. Katarzyna Niewiadoma was third overall at more than six and a half minutes down. Persico and Longo Borghini each went up a spot in the top ten while Ludwig dropped to seventh. With a strong ride on the final stage, Ewers entered the top ten on GC.

Marianne Vos (Team Jumbo–Visma) and Shirin van Anrooij (Trek–Segafredo) finished the stage safely to confirm their victories in the points and young riders classifications, respectively. The team classification was won by Canyon//SRAM as the team with the lowest aggregate time among their three best-placed riders. The super-combativity award was won by Marianne Vos. Out of 144 starters, 109 finished the event. Award ceremony commenced shortly after the finish of the stage.

Stage 8 Result
Rank	Rider	Team	Time
1	Annemiek van Vleuten (NED)	Movistar Team	3h 37' 23"
2	Demi Vollering (NED)	SD Worx	+ 30"
3	Silvia Persico (ITA)	Valcar–Travel & Service	+ 1' 43"
4	Katarzyna Niewiadoma (POL)	Canyon//SRAM	+ 1' 52"
5	Juliette Labous (FRA)	Team DSM	+ 1' 56"
6	Elisa Longo Borghini (ITA)	Trek–Segafredo	+ 2' 01"
7	Veronica Ewers (USA)	EF Education–EasyPost	+ 2' 13"
8	Cecilie Uttrup Ludwig (DEN)	FDJ Suez Futuroscope	+ 2' 50"
9	Mavi García (ESP)	UAE Team ADQ	+ 2' 59"
10	Liane Lippert (GER)	Team DSM	+ 3' 01"

Final general classification
Rank	Rider	Team	Time
1	Annemiek van Vleuten (NED)	Movistar Team	26h 55' 44"
2	Demi Vollering (NED)	SD Worx	+ 3' 48"
3	Katarzyna Niewiadoma (POL)	Canyon//SRAM	+ 6' 35"
4	Juliette Labous (FRA)	Team DSM	+ 7' 28"
5	Silvia Persico (ITA)	Valcar–Travel & Service	+ 8' 00"
6	Elisa Longo Borghini (ITA)	Trek–Segafredo	+ 8' 26"
7	Cecilie Uttrup Ludwig (DEN)	FDJ Suez Futuroscope	+ 8' 59"
8	Évita Muzic (FRA)	FDJ Suez Futuroscope	+ 13' 54"
9	Veronica Ewers (USA)	EF Education–EasyPost	+ 15' 05"
10	Mavi García (ESP)	UAE Team ADQ	+ 15' 15"
