= Emotional.fr–Tornatech–GSC Blagnac VS31 =

Canadian cycling team

Team information
- UCI code: ESG (2008–2010); GSD (2012–2013); SMM (2014–2016); SAS (2017); MAG (2018–2019); MTG (2020–)
- Registered: Canada
- Founded: 2008
- Discipline: Road
- Status: UCI Women's Team (2008–2013); National (2014–2016); UCI Women's Team (2017); National (2018–2019); UCI Women's Continental Team (2020–)

Key personnel
- General manager: Gérard Penarroya
- Team manager: Daniel Fedon

Team name history
- 2008–2010 2011–2012 2013 2014–2015 2016 2017 2018 2019 2020–2021 2022–: ESGL 93–GSD Gestion; Team GSD Gestion; GSD Gestion–Kallisto; SAS–Mazda–Macogep powered by Specialized; SAS–Macogep–Acquisio powered by Mazda; SAS–Macogep; Macogep–Argon18–Girondins p/b Mazda; Macogep–Tornatech–Specialized p/b Mazda; Macogep Tornatech Girondins de Bordeaux; Emotional.fr–Tornatech–GSC Blagnac VS31
Emotional.fr–Tornatech–GSC Blagnac VS31 jersey
Jersey

Emotional.fr–Tornatech–GSC Blagnac VS31 is a women's professional cycling team initially based in France and then later in Canada that competes in elite road bicycle racing.

== Team roster ==
As of 12 February 2021.

Rider	Date of birth
Luce Bourbeau (CAN)	6 March 1991 (age 35)
Morgane Coston (FRA)	28 December 1990 (age 35)
Chloe Fraser (GBR)	20 September 1993 (age 32)
Kerry Jonker (RSA)	21 May 1996 (age 30)
Frédérique Larose-Gingras (CAN)	12 January 1994 (age 32)
Juliette Larose-Gingras (CAN)	26 November 2002 (age 23)

Rider	Date of birth
Mireille Larose-Gingras (CAN)	18 February 2000 (age 26)
Andrea Martínez (MEX)	21 January 1994 (age 32)
Laury Milette (CAN)	20 November 2002 (age 23)
Florence Normand (CAN)	5 January 2002 (age 24)
Callie Swan (CAN)	9 March 1998 (age 28)
Balladyne Tritsch (FRA)	6 May 1995 (age 31)

== Major results ==
2008
GP de Chambéry-le-Vieux, Sophie Creux
Ronde du Mont Pujols, Béatrice Thomas
Chambéry Criterium, Sophie Creux
Le Pré-Saint-Gervais, Béatrice Thomas
Cergy Criterium, Sandrine Bideau
Classic Féminine Vienne Poitou-Charentes, Leda Cox
2009
Stages 2 & 3 Tucson Bicycle Classic, Joëlle Numainville
Stage 4 Trophée d'Or Féminin, Béatrice Thomas
Stage 5 Trophée d'Or Féminin, Joëlle Numainville
2011
Kasseien Omloop Exloo, Christine Majerus
2013
Aguascalientes Team Pursuit, Stephanie Roorda
Aguascalientes Points race, Katarzyna Pawłowska
Guadalajara Team Pursuit (F) : Stephanie Roorda
Aguascalientes 3km Pursuit, Katarzyna Pawłowska
Stage 3 Tour de Bretagne, Katarzyna Pawłowska
Overall Tour Féminin en Limousin, Katarzyna Pawłowska

Stages 3 & 4, Katarzyna Pawłowska

Prostějov Points race, Katarzyna Pawłowska
Pruszków Scratch, Katarzyna Pawłowska
Los Angeles Team Pursuit, Stephanie Roorda
2017
Jeux de la Francophonie Road Race, Pauline Allin

== World, Continental & National Champions ==
2008
Luxembourg Road Race, Christine Majerus
2009
Luxembourg Road Race, Christine Majerus
Canada U23 Road Race, Joëlle Numainville
Pan American Road Race, Joëlle Numainville
2010
Luxembourg Cyclo-cross, Christine Majerus
France Road Race Mélodie Lesueur
Luxembourg Time Trial, Christine Majerus
Luxembourg Road Race, Christine Majerus
2011
Luxembourg Cyclo-cross, Christine Majerus
Luxembourg Time Trial, Christine Majerus
Luxembourg Road Race, Christine Majerus
2012
Luxembourg Cyclo-cross, Christine Majerus
Luxembourg Time Trial, Christine Majerus
Luxembourg Road Race, Christine Majerus
Switzerland Time Trial, Patricia Schwager
Germany Track (Team pursuit), Lina-Kristin Schink
2013
World Track (Scratch race), Katarzyna Pawłowska
Poland Time Trial, Katarzyna Pawłowska
Poland Track (Individual pursuit), Katarzyna Pawłowska
Poland Track (Omnium), Katarzyna Pawłowska
2017
Costa Rica Time Trial, Milagro Mena
Canada Cyclo-cross, Christel Ferrier-Bruneau
2022
France U23 Time Trial, Célia Le Mouel

== Former rosters ==
2017

Team members as of 1 October 2017.

Rider	Date of birth
Pauline Allin (FRA)	2 May 1995 (age 31)
Marjolaine Bazin (FRA)	23 May 1986 (age 40)
Emma Bedard (CAN)	24 July 1989 (age 37)
Veronique Bilodeau (CAN)	15 November 1989 (age 36)
Christel Ferrier-Bruneau (CAN)	8 July 1979 (age 47)
Pascale Jeuland (FRA)	2 June 1987 (age 39)
Soline Lamboley (FRA)	11 October 1996 (age 29)

Rider	Date of birth
Frederique Larose Gingras (CAN)	12 January 1994 (age 32)
Milagro Mena Solano (CRC)	30 April 1993 (age 33)
Irena Ossola (USA)	18 April 1988 (age 38)
Adriane Provost (CAN)	19 December 1992 (age 33)
Sarah Rasmussen (CAN)	27 October 1992 (age 33)
Emilie Rochedy (FRA)	November 5, 1994 (age 31)
Iris Sachet (FRA)	29 May 1994 (age 32)
