= Irena Ossola =

American cyclist

Personal information
- Full name: Irena Ossola
- Born: April 19, 1988 (age 38)

Cycling career
- Sport: Cycling
- Discipline: Road
- Role: Rider

Professional teams
- 2017: SAS–Macogep
- 2019: Servetto–Piumate–Beltrami TSA

Irena Ossola (born April 19, 1988) is an American professional racing cyclist. who last rode for the UCI Women's Team Servetto–Piumate–Beltrami TSA during the 2019 women's road cycling season.
