= Balladyne Tritsch =

French cyclist

Personal information
- Born: 6 May 1995 (age 31)

Cycling career
- Sport: Cycling
- Current team: Emotional.fr–Tornatech–GSC Blagnac
- Discipline: Road
- Role: Rider

Amateur team
- 2018: SA Mérignac

Professional teams
- 2019–2020: Charente-Maritime Women Cycling
- 2021–: Macogep Tornatech Girondins de Bordeaux

Balladyne Tritsch (born 6 May 1995) is a French professional racing cyclist, who currently rides for UCI Women's Continental Team Emotional.fr–Tornatech–GSC Blagnac. In August 2020, she rode in the 2020 La Course by Le Tour de France race.
