= Chloe Fraser =

British cyclist

Personal information
- Full name: Chloe Fraser
- Born: 20 September 1993 (age 33)

Cycling career
- Sport: Cycling
- Current team: Emotional.fr–Tornatech–GSC Blagnac
- Discipline: Road
- Role: Rider

Amateur teams
- 2017–2020: The Racing Chance Foundation
- 2018: Macogep–Argon18–Girondins (guest)

Professional teams
- 2015: Team Rytger
- 2016: Lointek
- 2021–: Macogep Tornatech Girondins de Bordeaux

Chloe Fraser (born 20 September 1993) is a British professional racing cyclist from Scotland, who currently rides for UCI Women's Continental Team Emotional.fr–Tornatech–GSC Blagnac. From Dingwall, Fraser was the winner of the road race, at the 2015 Scottish Road Championships.

== See also ==
- List of 2015 UCI Women's Teams and riders
