= Megan Armitage =

Irish cyclist (born 1996)

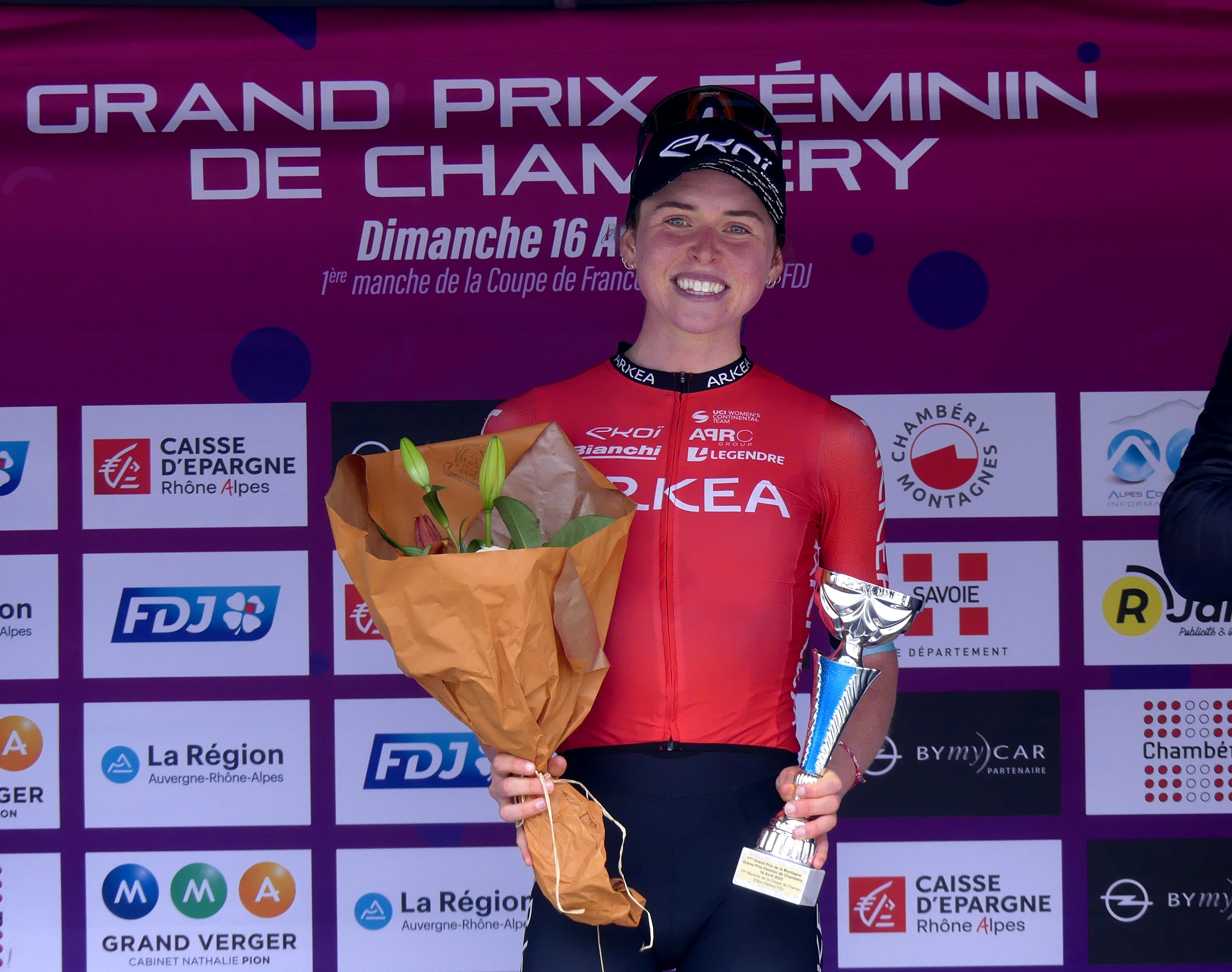
- Armitage in 2023

Personal information
- Born: 12 August 1996 (age 30)

Cycling career
- Sport: Cycling
- Current team: EF Education–Cannondale
- Discipline: Road
- Role: Rider

Professional teams
- 2021–2022: Team Rupelcleaning–Champion Lubricants
- 2023: Arkéa Pro Cycling Team
- 2024–: EF Education–Cannondale

Megan Armitage (born 12 August 1996) is an Irish racing cyclist, who rides for UCI Women's Continental Team EF Education–Cannondale.

== Early life ==
From Offaly, Armitage was a marathon runner while studying law and French at University College Dublin, and started cycling seriously during the COVID-19 pandemic.

== Career ==
=== 2023 ===
She became the first Irish female to win a UCI-ranked stage race with her GC victory at the Vuelta Extremadura Féminas in March 2023. She was selected by Arkéa Pro Cycling Team to ride the 2023 Tour de France Femmes, however she had to pull-out after a crash shortly before the grand start that involved a concussion after a head-on collision with a bus. She rode for Team Ireland at the 2023 UCI World Championships in Glasgow in August 2023. She finished fifth overall at the AG Tour de la Semois in Belgium in September 2023.

=== 2024 ===
She signed for UCI Women's Continental Team EF Education–Oatly, on a three-year contract, ahead of the 2024 season. She was selected to ride the Giro d'Italia Women in July 2024, However, she was unable to start the race due to sickness.

In July 2024, she was selected for the Irish team to compete in the road race at the 2024 Paris Olympics.

== Major results ==
2021
2nd Road race, National Road Championships
2023
1st Overall Vuelta Extremadura Féminas

1st Points classification
1st Stages 1 (TTT) & 3

3rd Road race, National Road Championships
4th Grand Prix de Chambéry
5th Overall Tour de la Semois
5th Overall Giro della Toscana Int. Femminile – Memorial Michela Fanini
