= Lone Meertens =

Belgian cyclist

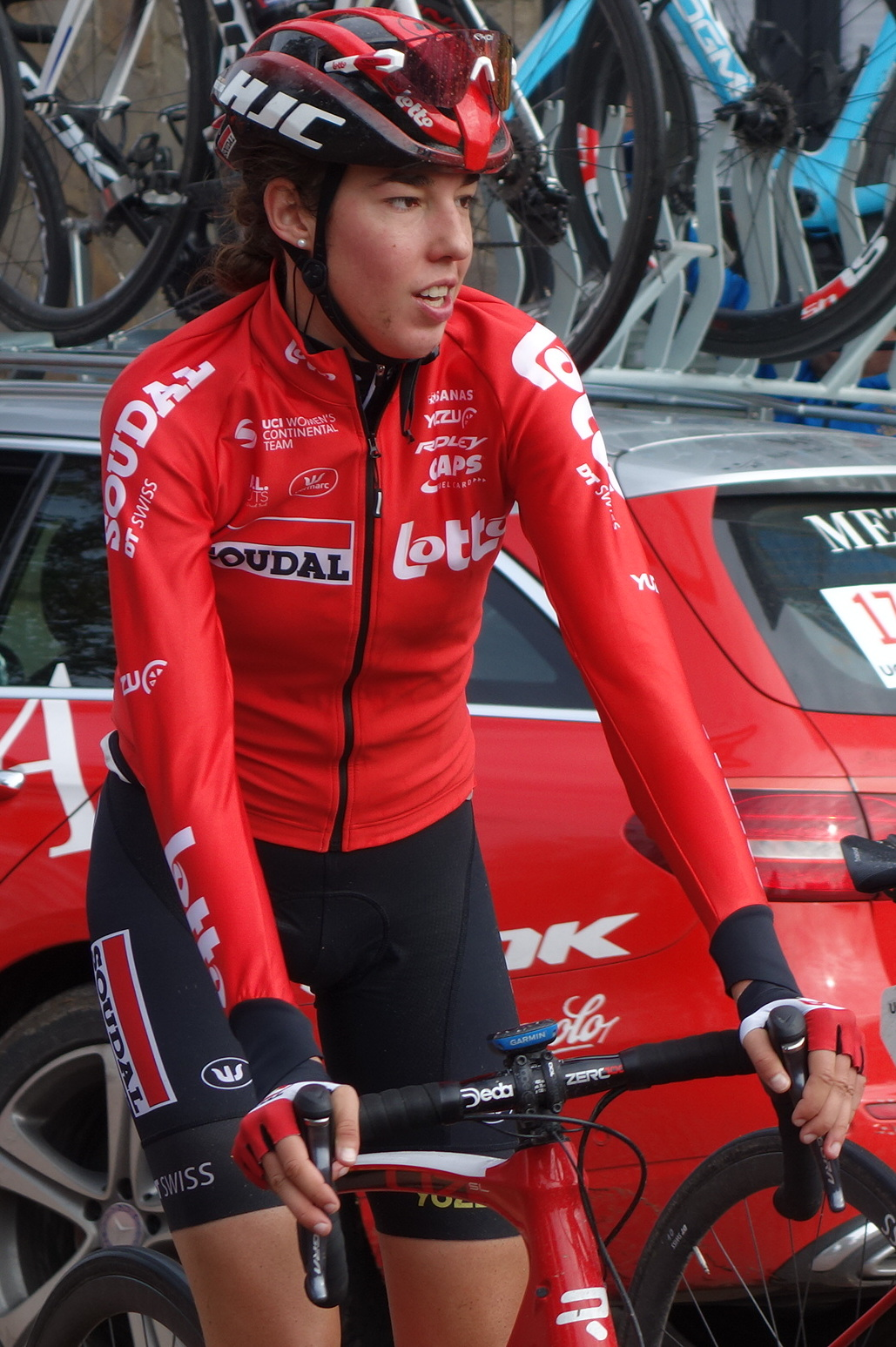
- Meertens at the 2020 Flèche Wallonne

Personal information
- Born: 16 April 1998 (age 28)

Cycling career
- Sport: Cycling
- Current team: VELOPRO - Alphamotorhomes CT
- Discipline: Road
- Role: Rider

Amateur team
- 2018–2019: Keukens Redant Cycling Team

Professional teams
- 2020–2021: Lotto–Soudal Ladies
- 2022–2023: NXTG by Experza
- 2024–: Proximus - Cyclis CT

Lone Meertens (born 16 April 1998) is a Belgian professional racing cyclist, who currently rides for UCI Women's Continental Team VELOPRO - Alphamotorhomes CT. She rode in the women's road race event at the 2020 UCI Road World Championships.
