= Sandrine Bideau =

French cyclist (born 1989)

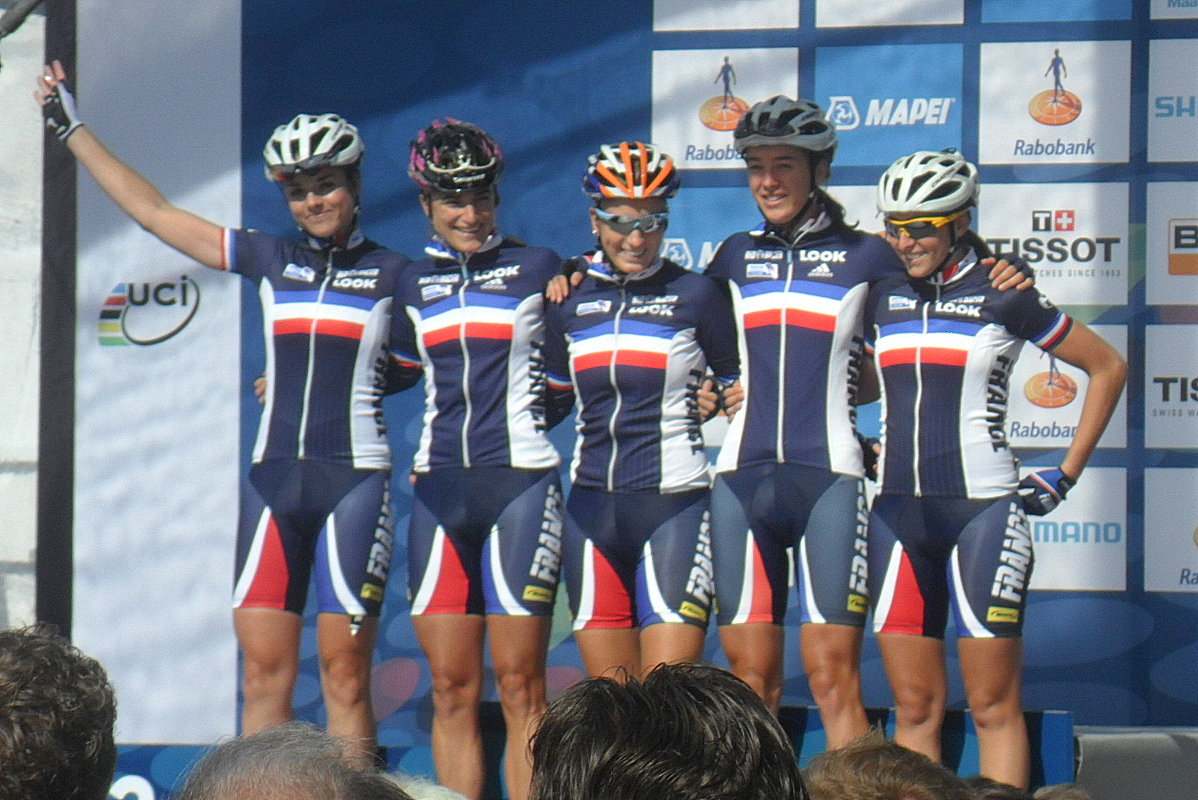
- Bideau (far right) at the 2012 UCI Road World Championships

Personal information
- Born: 12 April 1989 (age 37) Le Blanc-Mesnil, France

Cycling career
- Sport: Cycling
- Current team: St. Michel–Preference Home–Auber93
- Discipline: Road
- Role: Rider

Amateur teams
- 2015–2017: Team Féminin Région Centre
- 2018–2021: St. Michel–Auber93

Professional teams
- 2008–2009: Specialized Carrefour Multisport GSD Gestion
- 2012–2014: Vienne Futuroscope
- 2022–: St. Michel–Auber93

Sandrine Bideau (born 12 April 1989) is a French road cyclist, who currently rides for UCI Women's Continental Team St. Michel–Preference Home–Auber93. She participated at the 2012 UCI Road World Championships.

In 2015, Bideau finished second at the Grand Prix de Plumelec-Morbihan Dames and seventh at La Classique Morbihan.

Bideau was injured in June 2016 when she was struck by a following emergency car during the Vesoul One Day Race.
