= Vuelta a Extremadura Femenina =

Race details
- Date: March
- Region: Spain
- Discipline: Road
- Competition: UCI 2.2 (2023–2024); UCI 2.1 (2025–)
- Type: Stage race

History
- First edition: 2023
- Editions: 3 (as of 2025)
- First winner: Megan Armitage (IRL)
- Most recent: Ellen van Dijk (NED)

The Vuelta a Extremadura Femenina is an annual professional road bicycle race for women in Spain. First held in 2023, it is a UCI category 2.1 event. The race is held over three stages that cross the autonomous community of Extremadura in western Spain.

== Winners ==
Year	Winner	Second	Third
2023	(Republic of Ireland) Megan Armitage	(Canada) Clara Emond	(Netherlands) Maaike Coljé
2024	(Netherlands) Mareille Meijering	(Italy) Gaia Realini	(Australia) Brodie Chapman
2025	(Netherlands) Ellen van Dijk	(Norway) Mie Bjørndal Ottestad	(Italy) Greta Marturano
