= Arkéa–B&B Hotels Women =

French cycling team

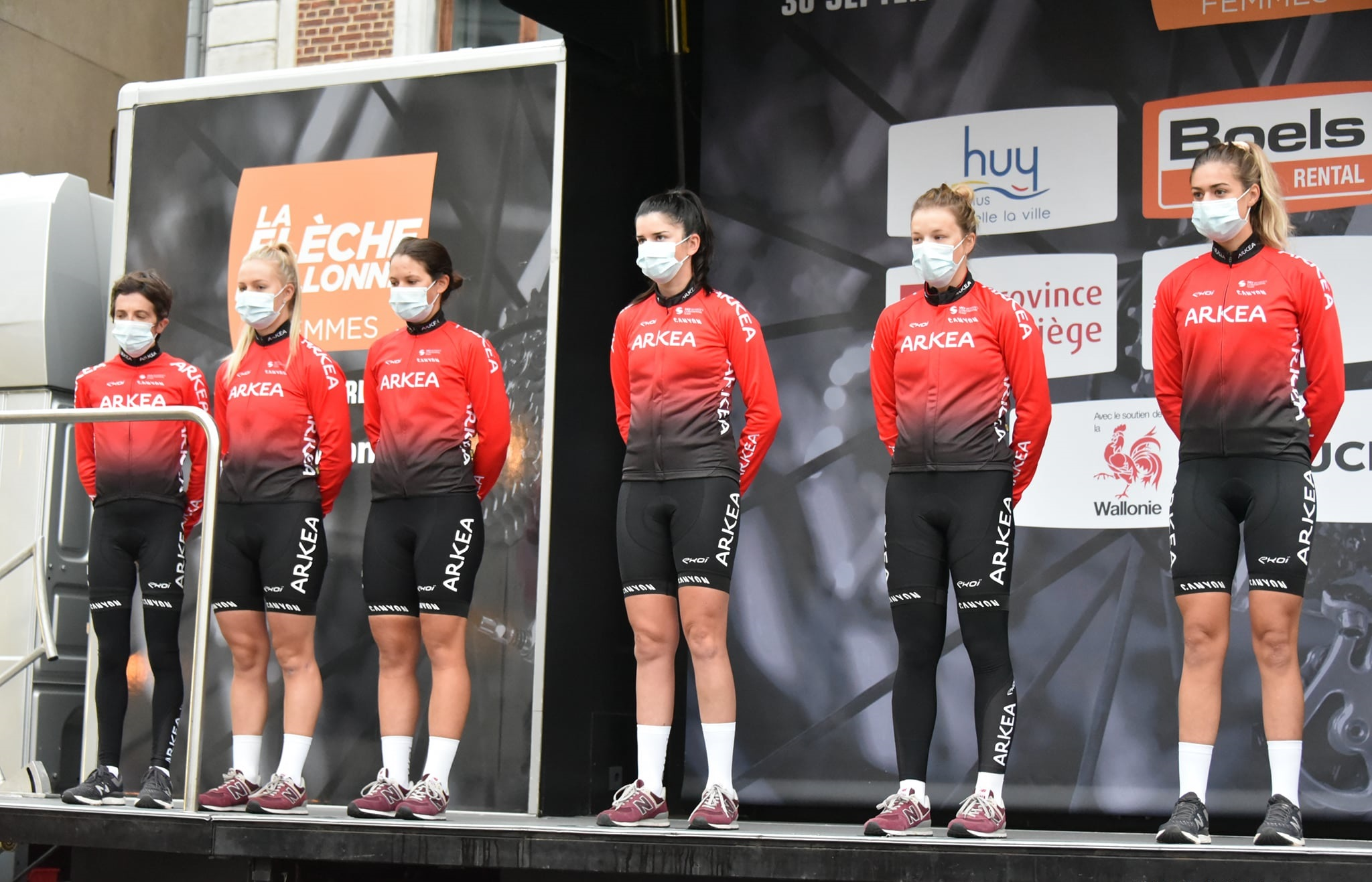

Team information
- UCI code: ARK (2020–)
- Registered: France
- Founded: 2020
- Disbanded: 2025
- Status: UCI Women's Continental Team (2020–2024); UCI Women's ProTeam (2025)

Team name history
- 2020–2023 2024–2025: Arkéa Pro Cycling Team; Arkéa–B&B Hotels Women

Arkéa–B&B Hotels Women is a French women's road bicycle racing team which participates in elite women's races. The team was established in 2020, and ended in 2025 after failing to find a sponsor for the 2026 season.

== Team roster ==
As of 3 March 2025.

Rider	Date of birth
Laura Asencio (FRA)	14 May 1998 (age 28)
Valentina Cavallar (AUT)	7 March 2001 (age 25)
Lotte Claes (BEL)	5 May 1993 (age 33)
Maaike Coljé (NED)	5 February 1997 (age 29)
Danielle De Francesco (AUS)	26 May 1992 (age 34)
Michaela Drummond (NZ)	5 May 1998 (age 28)

Rider	Date of birth
Emilia Fahlin (SWE)	24 October 1988 (age 37)
Amandine Fouquenet (FRA)	19 February 2001 (age 25)
Océane Mahe (FRA)	12 February 2002 (age 24)
Titia Ryo (FRA)	7 January 2005 (age 21)
Maurene Tregouet (FRA)	28 February 2004 (age 22)
Maria Apolonia Van 'T Geloof (NED)	27 March 1996 (age 30)

== Major results ==
2020
Stage 6 Tour de l'Ardèche, Pauline Allin
Topolcianky Cyclo-cross, Anaïs Morichon

2021
Chambéry road race, Gladys Verhulst
Boulzicourt Cyclo-cross, Amandine Fouquenet
Quelneuc Cyclo-cross I, Amandine Fouquenet
Quelneuc, Cyclo-cross II, Amandine Fouquenet
Bagnoles-de-l'Orne Cyclo-cross I, Amandine Fouquenet
Bagnoles-de-l'Orne Cyclo-cross II, Amandine Fouquenet
La Grandville Cyclo-cross, Léa Curinier

2022
GP de Semsales, Morgane Coston
Stage 5 Thüringen Ladies Tour, Yuliia Biriukova
Classic Féminine Vienne-Nouvelle-Aquitaine, Marie-Morgane Le Deunff
Grand Prix de Nantes, Amandine Fouquenet
Boulzicourt Cyclo-cross, Amandine Fouquenet

2023
Overall Vuelta Extremadura Féminas, Megan Armitage

Points classification, Megan Armitage
Stages 1 & 3, Megan Armitage

Stage 2 Giro della Toscana Int. Femminile – Memorial Michela Fanini, Anastasiya Kolesava

2025
Omloop Het Nieuwsblad, Lotte Claes

== National Champions ==
2021
France Cyclo-cross, Amandine Fouquenet
France Track (Madison), Marie-Morgane Le Deunff
2022
France U23 Road Race, Amandine Fouquenet
