= Morgane Coston =

French cyclist

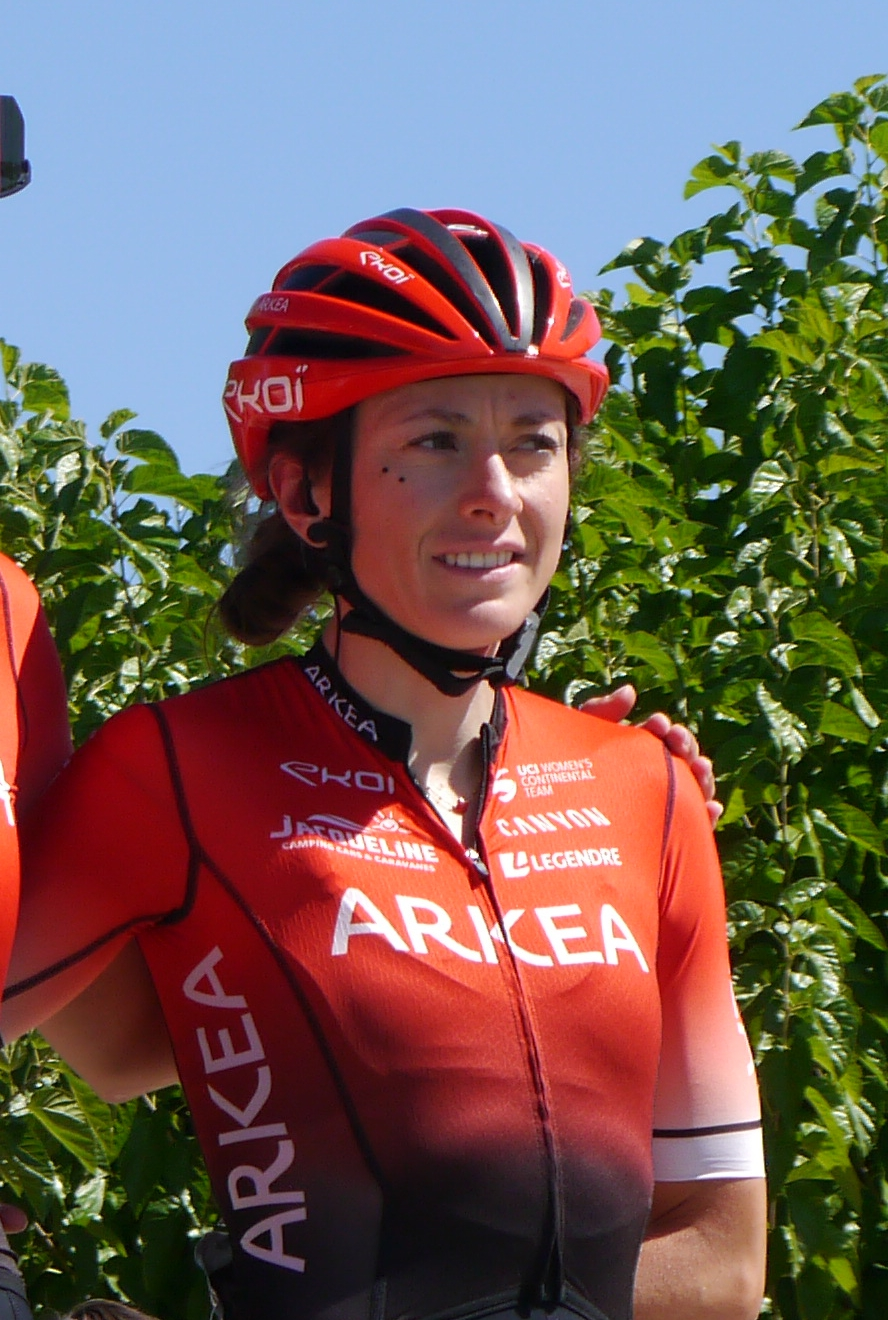
- Morgane Coston, TCFIA 2022.

Personal information
- Full name: Morgane Coston
- Born: 28 December 1990 (age 35)

Cycling career
- Sport: Cycling
- Current team: Roland Le Dévoluy
- Discipline: Road
- Role: Rider

Amateur teams
- 2017–2018: BioFrais–VC Saint-Julien-en-Genevois
- 2020: Chambéry CC

Professional teams
- 2019: Servetto–Piumate–Beltrami TSA
- 2021–2022: Macogep Tornatech Girondins de Bordeaux
- 2022: Arkéa Pro Cycling Team
- 2023–2024: Cofidis
- 2025: Roland Le Dévoluy
- 2026: Ma Petite Entreprise

Morgane Coston (born 28 December 1990 in Bellevue-la-Montagne) is a French racing cyclist, who currently rides for UCI Women's WorldTeam Roland Le Dévoluy.

== Career ==
She had signed to ride for the UCI Women's Team Servetto–Piumate–Beltrami TSA for the 2019 women's road cycling season, but elected to retire that February due to injury. She returned to racing 18 months later, signing for Chambéry CC. In October 2020, it was announced that Coston would return to the professional peloton in 2021, with the Macogep Tornatech Girondins de Bordeaux team. After a season with Roland Le Dévoluy, the team withdrew from the Women's World Tour to become a club team. Coston signed for Ma Petite Enterprise.

== Major results ==
2021
1st Mountains classification Kreiz Breizh Elites Dames
2nd Overall Tour de Feminin
9th Road race, National Road Championships
