= Emily Newsom =

American cyclist

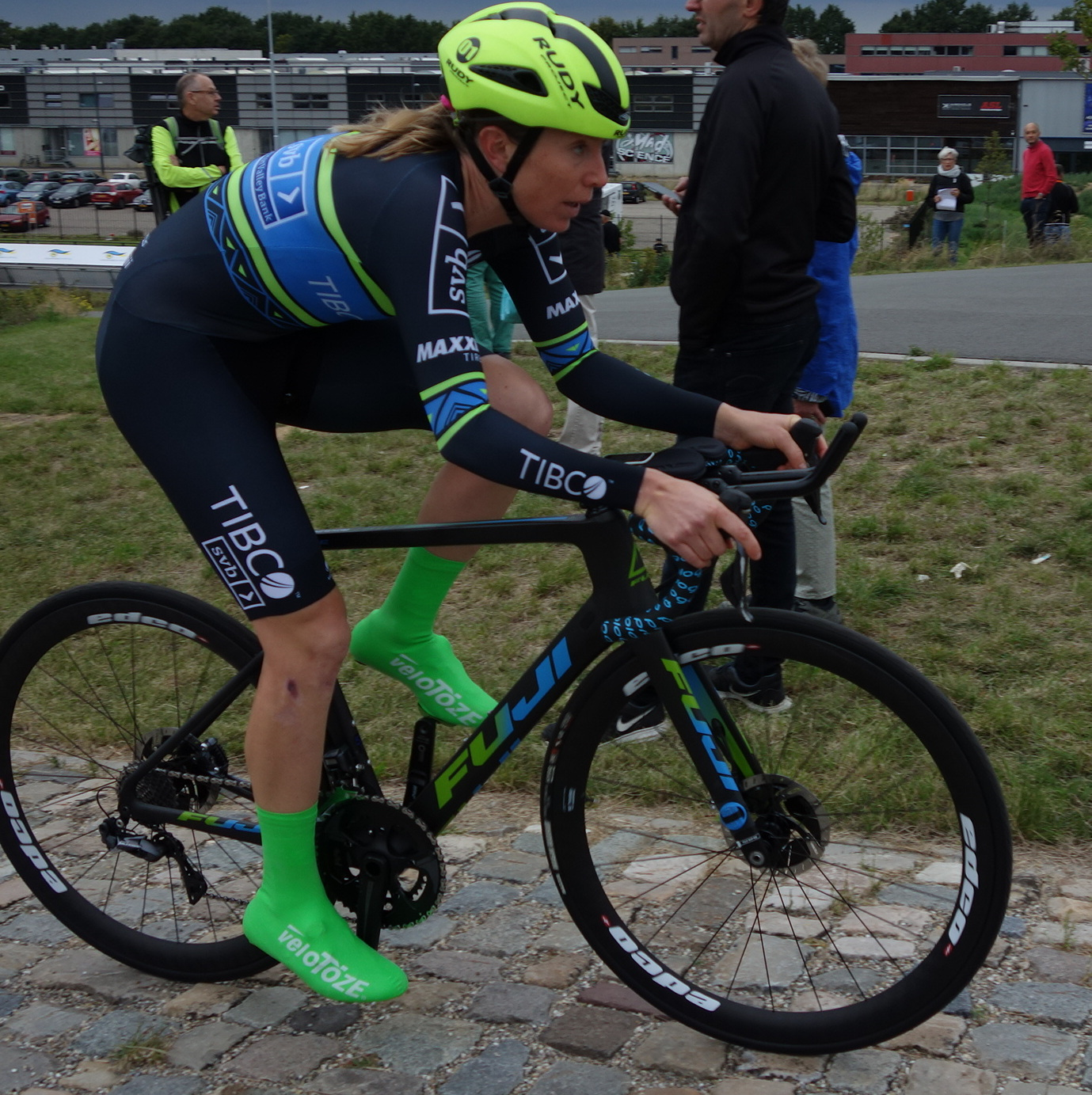
- Newsom in 2019

Personal information
- Full name: Emily Joy Newsom
- Born: September 4, 1983 (age 43) Burlington, Washington

Cycling career
- Sport: Cycling
- Current team: PAS Racing
- Disciplines: Road; Gravel
- Role: Rider

Amateur teams
- 2023: ROXO Racing
- 2025–: PAS Racing

Professional team
- 2018–2022: Tibco–Silicon Valley Bank

Emily Joy Newsom (born September 4, 1983) is an American professional racing cyclist, who currently rides for club team PAS Racing. Newsom won the inaugural Gravel Locos 150 in Hico, Texas in May 2021.
