= Cofidis Women Team =

French cycling team

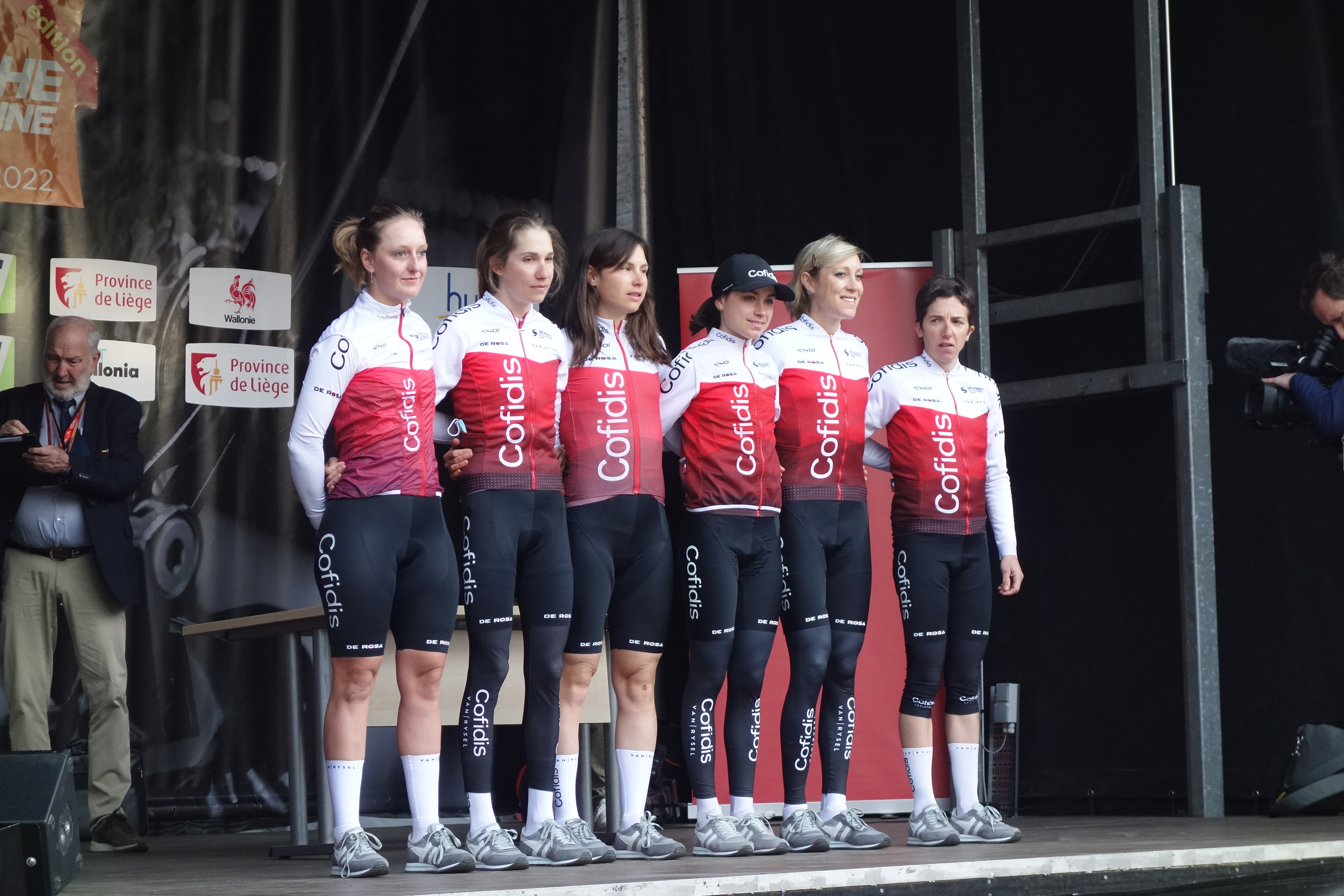

Team information
- UCI code: COF (2022–2024); CWT (2025–)
- Registered: France
- Founded: 2022
- Discipline: Road
- Status: UCI Women's Continental Team (2022–2024); UCI Women's ProTeam (2025–)
- Bicycles: De Rosa
- Components: Campagnolo
- Website: Team home page

Team name history
- 2022–: Cofidis Women Team

Cofidis Women Team is a professional road bicycle racing women's team which participates in elite women's races. The title sponsor is the French money lending company Cofidis.

== Team roster ==
As of 16 August 2023.

Rider	Date of birth
Martina Alzini (ITA)	7 October 1997 (age 28)
Julie Bego (FRA)	9 January 2005 (age 21)
Victoire Berteau (FRA)	16 August 2000 (age 26)
Flavie Boulais (FRA)	6 June 2003 (age 23)
Alana Castrique (BEL)	8 May 1999 (age 27)
Morgane Coston (FRA)	28 December 1990 (age 35)
Severine Eraud (FRA)	24 February 1995 (age 31)

Rider	Date of birth
Valentine Fortin (FRA)	24 April 1999 (age 27)
Špela Kern (SLO)	24 February 1990 (age 36)
Clara Koppenburg (GER)	3 August 1995 (age 31)
Lise Menage (FRA)	26 August 2004 (age 22)
Rachel Neylan (AUS)	9 March 1982 (age 44)
Gabrielle Pilote Fortin (CAN)	26 April 1993 (age 33)
Josie Talbot (AUS)	9 August 1996 (age 30)

== Major results ==
2022
Stage 4 Bretagne Ladies Tour, Martina Alzini
Strijpen road race, Alana Castrique

== World champions ==
World Track (Team pursuit), Martina Alzini
