= Alana Castrique =

Belgian sport cyclist

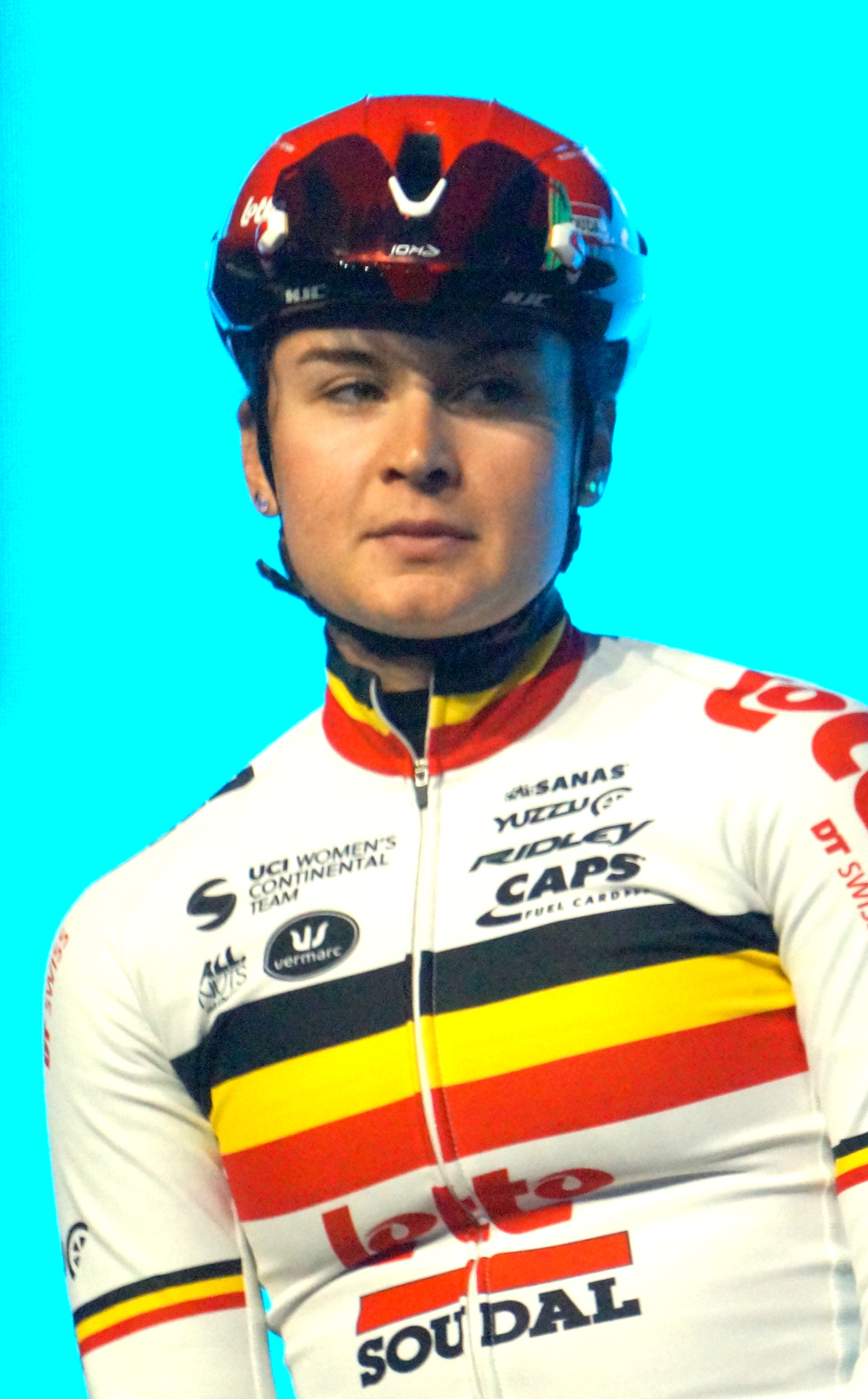

Personal information
- Full name: Alana Castrique
- Born: 8 May 1999 (age 27)

Cycling career
- Sport: Cycling
- Current team: AG Insurance–Soudal
- Discipline: Road
- Role: Rider

Professional teams
- 2018–2021: Lotto–Soudal Ladies
- 2022–2024: Cofidis
- 2025–: AG Insurance–Soudal
Medal record
Women's road bicycle racing
Representing Belgium
European Championships
Bronze medal – third place	2024 Limburg	Mixed team relay

Alana Castrique (born 8 May 1999) is a Belgian professional racing cyclist, who currently rides for UCI Women's WorldTeam AG Insurance–Soudal.

== Major results ==
2017
2nd Time trial, National Junior Road Championships
2018
2nd Time trial, National Under-23 Road Championships
2019
1st Time trial, National Under-23 Road Championships
5th Road race, National Road Championships
2021
3rd Road race, National Road Championships
3rd Time trial, National Under-23 Road Championships
2024
1st National Gravel Championships
