= Pauline Allin =

French cyclist (born 1995)

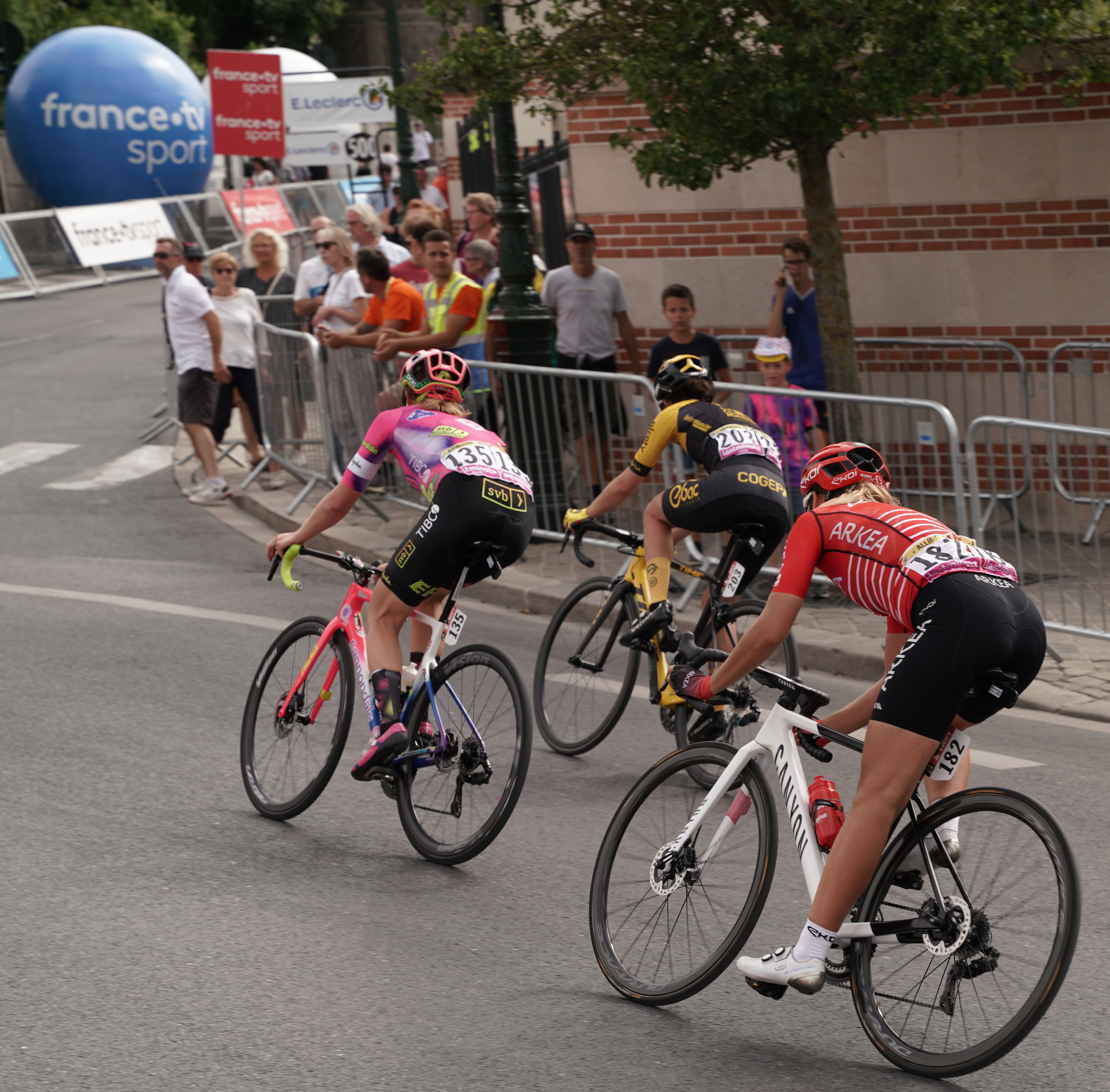

Personal information
- Full name: Pauline Allin
- Born: 2 May 1995 (age 31)

Cycling career
- Sport: Cycling
- Discipline: Road
- Role: Rider
- Rider type: Puncheur

Amateur teams
- 2016: VC Morteau-Montbenoît
- 2017–2018: DN 17 Nouvelle Aquitaine

Professional teams
- 2017: SAS–Macogep
- 2019: Charente-Maritime Women Cycling
- 2020–2022: Arkéa Pro Cycling Team
- 2023–2024: Cynisca Cycling

Pauline Allin (born 2 May 1995) is a French professional racing cyclist, who most recently rode for UCI Women's Continental Team Cynisca Cycling. Allin was a member of the Charente-Maritime Women Cycling team, from 2017 to its first UCI season in 2019.

== Major results ==
2017
1st Jeux de la Francophonie
2020
1st Stage 6 Tour Cycliste Féminin International de l'Ardèche
