= 2019 UCI Women's World Tour =

Series of women's road cycling races

- Fourth edition of the UCI Women's World Tour

Details
- Dates: 9 March – 22 October 2019
- Location: Europe; USA; China
- Races: 23

Champions
- Individual champion: Marianne Vos (Netherlands) (CCC - Liv)
- Teams' champion: Boels–Dolmans

The 2019 UCI Women's World Tour was a competition that included twenty-three road cycling events throughout the 2019 women's cycling season. It was the fourth edition of the ranking system launched by the Union Cycliste Internationale (UCI) in 2016. The competition began with the Strade Bianche on 9 March and concluded with the Tour of Guangxi on 22 October.

After just missing out in 2018, Marianne Vos (CCC - Liv) clinched her first UCI Women's World Tour title after a third-place finish in the final event of the season, the Tour of Guangxi. Vos, who finished with 1592 points, took three overall victories during the season at Trofeo Alfredo Binda-Comune di Cittiglio, La Course by Le Tour de France and the Ladies Tour of Norway and podiumed at three further events. 2018 winner Annemiek van Vleuten of the Mitchelton–Scott team led the standings for the majority of the season, but was surpassed by Vos at the final event; van Vleuten's tally of 1467.67 points included a trio of victories at Strade Bianche, Liège–Bastogne–Liège and the Giro Rosa and three second-place finishes in the month of April. The top-three overall was completed by the season's best young rider, Parkhotel Valkenburg's Lorena Wiebes on 1302.33 points. Wiebes took two overall victories during the season; she was the benefactor of Kirsten Wild's disqualification from victory at the Prudential RideLondon Classique, while at the Tour of Chongming Island, Wiebes won all three stages, as well as the general, points and young rider classifications. From the 22 individual events, a total of 12 riders won races while the World Tour lead changed five times between van Vleuten, Vos and Marta Bastianelli (Team Virtu Cycling).

With 46 points, Wiebes was the winner of the youth classification for riders under the age of 23. Wiebes took seven victories during the season including three consecutive races at the Prudential RideLondon Classique, the Postnord UCI WWT Vårgårda West Sweden race and the Ladies Tour of Norway. Second place went to Valcar–Cylance rider Marta Cavalli with 42 points, who won four races during the 2019 season. In the World Tour's other classification, the teams classification, Boels–Dolmans made it four consecutive titles with a total of 4045 points; three of their riders – Anna van der Breggen (three wins), Amy Pieters and Christine Majerus (one win) – all finished inside the top-ten of the individual standings. They finished well clear of second-place Team Sunweb on 2946 points – who failed to take an overall victory – and the new-for-2019 Trek–Segafredo team, who took three victories, finished third with 2547.98 points.

== Teams ==
For the 2019 season the following teams were not listed by the UCI at UCI Women's team level: Alasayl Cycling Team, Cylance Pro Cycling, Experza–Footlogix, S.C. Michela Fanini Rox, Storey Racing, UnitedHealthcare and Wiggle High5.

2019 UCI Women's Teams
Code	Official Team Name	Country
ALE	Alé–Cipollini	Italy
VAI	Aromitalia–Basso Bikes–Vaiano	Italy
ASA	Astana	Kazakhstan
BPK	Bepink	Italy
BPC	Biehler Pro Cycling	Netherlands
CBT	Bigla Pro Cycling	Denmark
BDM	Bizkaia–Durango	Spain
DLT	Boels–Dolmans	Netherlands
BTC	BTC City Ljubljana	Slovenia
LPR	Canyon//SRAM	Germany
CCC	CCC - Liv	Netherlands
CMW	Charente-Maritime Women Cycling	France
GPC	China Liv Pro Cycling	Hong Kong
CGS	Cogeas–Mettler–Look	Russia
CZF	Conceria Zabri–Fanini	Albania
DVE	Doltcini–Van Eyck Sport	Belgium
DRP	Drops	Great Britain
EIC	Eneicat	Spain
SBT	Eurotarget–Bianchi–Vittoria	Italy
FDJ	FDJ Nouvelle-Aquitaine Futuroscope	France
HBS	Hagens Berman–Supermint	United States
HCT	Health Mate–Cyclelive Team	Belgium
HPU	Hitec Products–Birk Sport	Norway
LSL	Lotto–Soudal Ladies	Belgium
LCW	Lviv Cycling Team	Ukraine
MAT	Massi–Tactic	Spain
MEM	Memorial–Santos	Brazil
MCC	Minsk Cycling Club	Belarus
MTS	Mitchelton–Scott	Australia
MOV	Movistar Team	Spain
PHV	Parkhotel Valkenburg	Netherlands
RLW	Rally UHC Cycling	United States
SER	Servetto–Piumate–Beltrami TSA	Italy
SWT	Sopela Women's Team	Spain
SWA	Swapit–Agolíco	Mexico
TDP	Team Dukla Praha	Czech Republic
ILU	Team Illuminate	United States
SUN	Team Sunweb	Netherlands
TVC	Team Virtu Cycling	Denmark
TWC	Thailand Women's Cycling Team	Thailand
TIB	Tibco–Silicon Valley Bank	United States
TOG	Top Girls Fassa Bortolo	Italy
TFS	Trek–Segafredo	United States
T20	Sho-Air Twenty20	United States
VAL	Valcar–Cylance	Italy
WCC	WCC Team	Stateless
WNT	WNT–Rotor Pro Cycling	Germany

== Events ==
For the 2019 season, the calendar consisted of 23 races, down from 24 in 2018.

2019 UCI Women's World Tour
Race	Date	First	Second	Third	Leader
(Italy) Strade Bianche	9 March	Annemiek van Vleuten (NED); Mitchelton–Scott	Annika Langvad (DNK); Boels–Dolmans	Katarzyna Niewiadoma (POL); Canyon//SRAM	Annemiek van Vleuten (NED); Mitchelton–Scott
(Netherlands) Ronde van Drenthe	17 March	Marta Bastianelli (ITA); Team Virtu Cycling	Chantal Blaak (NED); Boels–Dolmans	Ellen van Dijk (NED); Trek–Segafredo	Marta Bastianelli (ITA); Team Virtu Cycling
(Italy) Trofeo Alfredo Binda-Comune di Cittiglio	24 March	Marianne Vos (NED); CCC - Liv	Amanda Spratt (AUS); Mitchelton–Scott	Cecilie Uttrup Ludwig (DNK); Bigla Pro Cycling	Marta Bastianelli (ITA); Team Virtu Cycling
(Belgium) Three Days of De Panne	28 March	Kirsten Wild (NED); WNT–Rotor Pro Cycling	Lorena Wiebes (NED); Parkhotel Valkenburg	Lotte Kopecky (BEL); Lotto–Soudal Ladies	Marta Bastianelli (ITA); Team Virtu Cycling
(Belgium) Gent–Wevelgem	31 March	Kirsten Wild (NED); WNT–Rotor Pro Cycling	Lorena Wiebes (NED); Parkhotel Valkenburg	Letizia Paternoster (ITA); Trek–Segafredo	Marta Bastianelli (ITA); Team Virtu Cycling
(Belgium) Tour of Flanders	7 April	Marta Bastianelli (ITA); Team Virtu Cycling	Annemiek van Vleuten (NED); Mitchelton–Scott	Cecilie Uttrup Ludwig (DNK); Bigla Pro Cycling	Marta Bastianelli (ITA); Team Virtu Cycling
(Netherlands) Amstel Gold Race	21 April	Katarzyna Niewiadoma (POL); Canyon//SRAM	Annemiek van Vleuten (NED); Mitchelton–Scott	Marianne Vos (NED); CCC - Liv	Marta Bastianelli (ITA); Team Virtu Cycling
(Belgium) La Flèche Wallonne	24 April	Anna van der Breggen (NED); Boels–Dolmans	Annemiek van Vleuten (NED); Mitchelton–Scott	Annika Langvad (DNK); Boels–Dolmans	Marta Bastianelli (ITA); Team Virtu Cycling
(Belgium) Liège–Bastogne–Liège	28 April	Annemiek van Vleuten (NED); Mitchelton–Scott	Floortje Mackaij (NED); Team Sunweb	Demi Vollering (NED); Parkhotel Valkenburg	Annemiek van Vleuten (NED); Mitchelton–Scott
(China) Tour of Chongming Island	9–11 May	Lorena Wiebes (NED); Parkhotel Valkenburg	Jutatip Maneephan (THA); Thailand Women's Cycling Team	Lotte Kopecky (BEL); Lotto–Soudal Ladies	Annemiek van Vleuten (NED); Mitchelton–Scott
(United States) Tour of California	16–18 May	Anna van der Breggen (NED); Boels–Dolmans	Katie Hall (USA); Boels–Dolmans	Ashleigh Moolman (RSA); CCC - Liv	Annemiek van Vleuten (NED); Mitchelton–Scott
(Spain) Emakumeen Euskal Bira	22–25 May	Elisa Longo Borghini (ITA); Trek–Segafredo	Amanda Spratt (AUS); Mitchelton–Scott	Soraya Paladin (ITA); Alé–Cipollini	Annemiek van Vleuten (NED); Mitchelton–Scott
(United Kingdom) Ovo Energy Women's Tour	10–15 June	Lizzie Deignan (GBR); Trek–Segafredo	Katarzyna Niewiadoma (POL); Canyon//SRAM	Amy Pieters (NED); Boels–Dolmans	Annemiek van Vleuten (NED); Mitchelton–Scott
(Italy) Giro Rosa	5–14 July	Annemiek van Vleuten (NED); Mitchelton–Scott	Anna van der Breggen (NED); Boels–Dolmans	Amanda Spratt (AUS); Mitchelton–Scott	Annemiek van Vleuten (NED); Mitchelton–Scott
La Course by Le Tour de France	19 July	Marianne Vos (NED); CCC - Liv	Leah Kirchmann (CAN); Team Sunweb	Cecilie Uttrup Ludwig (DNK); Bigla Pro Cycling	Annemiek van Vleuten (NED); Mitchelton–Scott
(United Kingdom) Prudential RideLondon Classique	3 August	Lorena Wiebes (NED); Parkhotel Valkenburg	Elisa Balsamo (ITA); Valcar–Cylance	Coryn Rivera (USA); Team Sunweb	Annemiek van Vleuten (NED); Mitchelton–Scott
Postnord UCI WWT Vårgårda West Sweden TTT	17 August	Trek–Segafredo	Canyon//SRAM	Team Sunweb	Annemiek van Vleuten (NED); Mitchelton–Scott
Postnord UCI WWT Vårgårda West Sweden	18 August	Marta Bastianelli (ITA); Team Virtu Cycling	Marianne Vos (NED); CCC - Liv	Lorena Wiebes (NED); Parkhotel Valkenburg	Annemiek van Vleuten (NED); Mitchelton–Scott
Ladies Tour of Norway	22–25 August	Marianne Vos (NED); CCC - Liv	Coryn Rivera (USA); Team Sunweb	Leah Kirchmann (CAN); Team Sunweb	Marianne Vos (NED); CCC - Liv
(France) GP de Plouay - Lorient Agglomération Trophée WNT	31 August	Anna van der Breggen (NED); Boels–Dolmans	Coryn Rivera (USA); Team Sunweb	Amy Pieters (NED); Boels–Dolmans	Marianne Vos (NED); CCC - Liv
(Netherlands) Boels Ladies Tour	3–8 September	Christine Majerus (LUX); Boels–Dolmans	Lorena Wiebes (NED); Parkhotel Valkenburg	Lisa Klein (DEU); Canyon//SRAM	Annemiek van Vleuten (NED); Mitchelton–Scott
(Spain) Ceratizit Madrid Challenge by la Vuelta	14–15 September	Lisa Brennauer (DEU); WNT–Rotor Pro Cycling	Lucinda Brand (NED); Team Sunweb	Pernille Mathiesen (DNK); Team Sunweb	Annemiek van Vleuten (NED); Mitchelton–Scott
(China) Tour of Guangxi Women's WorldTour race	22 October	Chloe Hosking (AUS); Alé–Cipollini	Alison Jackson (CAN); Tibco–Silicon Valley Bank	Marianne Vos (NED); CCC - Liv	Marianne Vos (NED); CCC - Liv

== Points standings ==
For the 2019 season, the point-scoring system introduced by the Union Cycliste Internationale (UCI) in 2018, rewarding the top 40 riders remained in place.

=== Individual ===
Riders tied with the same number of points were classified by number of victories, then number of second places, third places, and so on, in World Tour events and stages.

Individual rankings
Rank	Name	Team	Points
1	Marianne Vos (NED)	CCC - Liv	1592
2	Annemiek van Vleuten (NED)	Mitchelton–Scott	1467.67
3	Lorena Wiebes (NED)	Parkhotel Valkenburg	1302.33
4	Katarzyna Niewiadoma (POL)	Canyon//SRAM	1240.17
5	Anna van der Breggen (NED)	Boels–Dolmans	1095
6	Marta Bastianelli (ITA)	Team Virtu Cycling	1077
7	Amy Pieters (NED)	Boels–Dolmans	841
8	Lucinda Brand (NED)	Team Sunweb	797.50
9	Christine Majerus (LUX)	Boels–Dolmans	690.67
10	Amanda Spratt (AUS)	Mitchelton–Scott	680.67
11	Soraya Paladin (ITA)	Alé–Cipollini	660
12	Cecilie Uttrup Ludwig (DNK)	Bigla Pro Cycling	651.33
13	Elisa Longo Borghini (ITA)	Trek–Segafredo	646.33
14	Demi Vollering (NED)	Parkhotel Valkenburg	614.33
15	Coryn Rivera (USA)	Team Sunweb	596.83
16	Ashleigh Moolman (RSA)	CCC - Liv	582
17	Lotte Kopecky (BEL)	Lotto–Soudal Ladies	574
18	Leah Kirchmann (CAN)	Team Sunweb	563.50
19	Kirsten Wild (NED)	WNT–Rotor Pro Cycling	509.67
20	Floortje Mackaij (NED)	Team Sunweb	476.50
272 riders have scored points

=== Youth ===
The top three riders in the final results of each World Tour event's young rider classification received points towards the standings. Six points were awarded to first place, four points to second place and two points to third place.

Youth rankings
Rank	Name	Team	Points
1	Lorena Wiebes (NED)	Parkhotel Valkenburg	46
2	Marta Cavalli (ITA)	Valcar–Cylance	42
3	Sofia Bertizzolo (ITA)	Team Virtu Cycling	22
4	Évita Muzic (FRA)	FDJ Nouvelle-Aquitaine Futuroscope	22
5	Elisa Balsamo (ITA)	Valcar–Cylance	20
6	Juliette Labous (FRA)	Team Sunweb	16
7	Paula Patiño (COL)	Movistar Team	10
8	Letizia Paternoster (ITA)	Trek–Segafredo	10
9	Chiara Consonni (ITA)	Valcar–Cylance	8
10	Liane Lippert (GER)	Team Sunweb	8
11	Pernille Mathiesen (DNK)	Team Sunweb	6
12	Nikola Nosková (CZE)	Bigla Pro Cycling	6
13	Ella Harris (NZL)	Canyon//SRAM	6
14	Hanna Tserakh (BLR)	Minsk Cycling Club	4
15	Maaike Boogaard (NED)	BTC City Ljubljana	4
16	Mikayla Harvey (NZL)	Bigla Pro Cycling	4
17	Susanne Andersen (NOR)	Team Sunweb	4
18	Amber van der Hulst (NED)	Netherlands (national team)	4
19	Franziska Koch (GER)	Team Sunweb	4
20	Katia Ragusa (ITA)	Bepink	4
27 riders have scored points

=== Team ===
Team rankings were calculated by adding the ranking points of all the riders of a team in the table.

Rank	Team	Points	Scoring riders
1	Boels–Dolmans	4045	11 riders Van der Breggen (1095), Pieters (841), Majerus (690.67), Langvad (395), Hall (284.33), Blaak (280.33), Dideriksen (127.67), Canuel (122), D'Hoore (95), van den Bos (69.67), Buurman (44.33)
2	Team Sunweb	2946	11 riders Brand (797.50), Rivera (596.83), Kirchmann (563.50), Mackaij (476.50), Mathiesen (165.50), Labous (107.50), Andersen (107), Koch (73), Lippert (42), Soek (11.67), Georgi (5)
3	Trek–Segafredo	2547.98	12 riders Longo Borghini (646.33), Deignan (469), Paternoster (355), van Dijk (296.33), Wiles (248.33), Winder (229.33), Lepistö (118), Plichta (76), Cordon-Ragot (61.33), Worrack (35.33), Neff (10), Van Twisk (3)
4	Mitchelton–Scott	2517.02	10 riders Van Vleuten (1467.67), (Note: Van Vleuten was given a five-point sanction, as per Article 2.12.007 of the UCI road racing regulations.) Spratt (680.67), Roy (134.67), Elvin (80), Kennedy (58.67), Brown (27.67), Tenniglo (26.67), Williams (20), Allen (14), Manly (7)
5	CCC - Liv	2451	Vos (1592), Moolman (582), R. Markus (109), Rooijakkers (56), Korevaar (47), Lach (23), Demey (21), Skalniak (13), Kuijpers (8)
6	Canyon//SRAM	2215.02	13 riders Niewiadoma (1240.17), Klein (282), Cecchini (233), Amialiusik (121.17), Shapira (78.17), Erath (70), A. Barnes (69), H. Barnes (57.17), Cromwell (39.17), A. Ryan (9.17), Gafinovitz (6), Harris (5), Ludwig (5)
7	Parkhotel Valkenburg	2072.98 (Note: Listed by the UCI on 2058.65 points, missing Roxane Knetemann's points.)	Wiebes (1302.33), Vollering (614.33), De Vuyst (109), F. Markus (23.33), Knetemann (14.33), (Note: Not listed by the UCI.) Buysman (6.33), Raaijmakers (3.33)
8	WNT–Rotor Pro Cycling	1578.02 (Note: Listed by the UCI on 1557.35 points, missing Kathrin Hammes' points.)	11 riders Wild (509.67), Brennauer (448), Santesteban (206.67), Koppenburg (149), Magnaldi (124.67), Ensing (73.67), (Note: Ensing scored 53 points with Team Sunweb prior to leaving the team in May 2019. Ensing then joined WNT–Rotor Pro Cycling later that month, and all points were transferred.) Vieceli (24.67), Hammes (20.67), Teutenberg (8), C. Koster (8), Rijkes (5)
9	Team Virtu Cycling	1548	13 riders Bastianelli (1077), Bertizzolo (154.20), Aalerud (90.20), Neylan (74.20), A. Koster (48.45), Siggaard (27.25), Kröger (24.25), Guarischi (24), Norman Hansen (21.25), Penton (3), Moberg (3), Krogsgaard (1.20)
10	Alé–Cipollini	1315	10 riders S. Paladin (660), Hosking (443), Kasper (76), Yonamine (57), Swinkels (28), Quagliotto (20), Trevisi (14), van't Geloof (6), Peñuela (6), Na (5)
11	Valcar–Cylance	1231	12 riders Balsamo (376), Cavalli (364), Confalonieri (174), Consonni (138), Sanguineti (103), Arzuffi (19), Guazzini (15), Vigilia (15), Persico (11), Pirrone (10), (Note: Pirrone was given a five-point sanction, as per Article 2.12.007 of the UCI road racing regulations.) Pollicini (3), A. Paladin (3)
12	Bigla Pro Cycling	1115.98	10 riders Uttrup Ludwig (651.33), Thomas (143.33), Banks (140.33), Leth (47), Chabbey (40.33), Nosková (35.33), Norsgaard (21), Harvey (16.33), Wright (11), Sperotto (10)
13	Lotto–Soudal Ladies	706	Kopecky (574), Van de Velde (55), Braam (20), Van den Steen (18), D. de Jong (14), Dom (11), Christmas (8), Nguyễn (6)
14	Movistar Team	694.98	10 riders García (215), Fournier (166), Jasińska (86.33), Gutiérrez (85.33), Merino (63.33), Biannic (44.33), Oyarbide (12), Patiño (11.33), Rodríguez (8.33), Llamas (3)
15	Tibco–Silicon Valley Bank	655	11 riders Jackson (265.75), Chapman (157), Kessler (150), Stephens (40), Slik (10), Lucas (8.75), Dixon (6.75), Henderson (5), K. Ryan (5), Malseed (3.75), Newsom (3)
16	FDJ Nouvelle-Aquitaine Futuroscope	637	13 riders Fahlin (175), Duval (146), Borgli (119), Gillow (61), Muzic (37), Guilman (22), Grossetête (21), Kitchen (19), Demay (18), Becker (6), Wiel (5), Copponi (5), Bravard (3)
17	BTC City Ljubljana	511.02	12 riders Chursina (152.17), Bujak (143.17), Boogaard (57.17), Nilsson (57.17), Pintar (37.17), van de Ree (30), Radotić (18), Simmonds (4.17), Kern (3), Bravec (3), Ratto (3), Žigart (3)
18	Hitec Products–Birk Sport	416	Tagliaferro (149), van der Haar (143), Uneken (62), Heine (48), (Note: Heine's tally includes 5 points earned at the Postnord UCI WWT Vårgårda West Sweden race, where Hitec Products–Birk Sport were not competing.) Gåskjenn (5), Meyer Solvang (3), Lorvik (3), Feldmann (3)
19	Astana	239	Sierra (226), Moreno (5), Blais (5), Salazar (3)
20	Thailand Women's Cycling Team	190	Maneephan (190)
41 teams have scored points
