= Coryn Labecki =

American cyclist

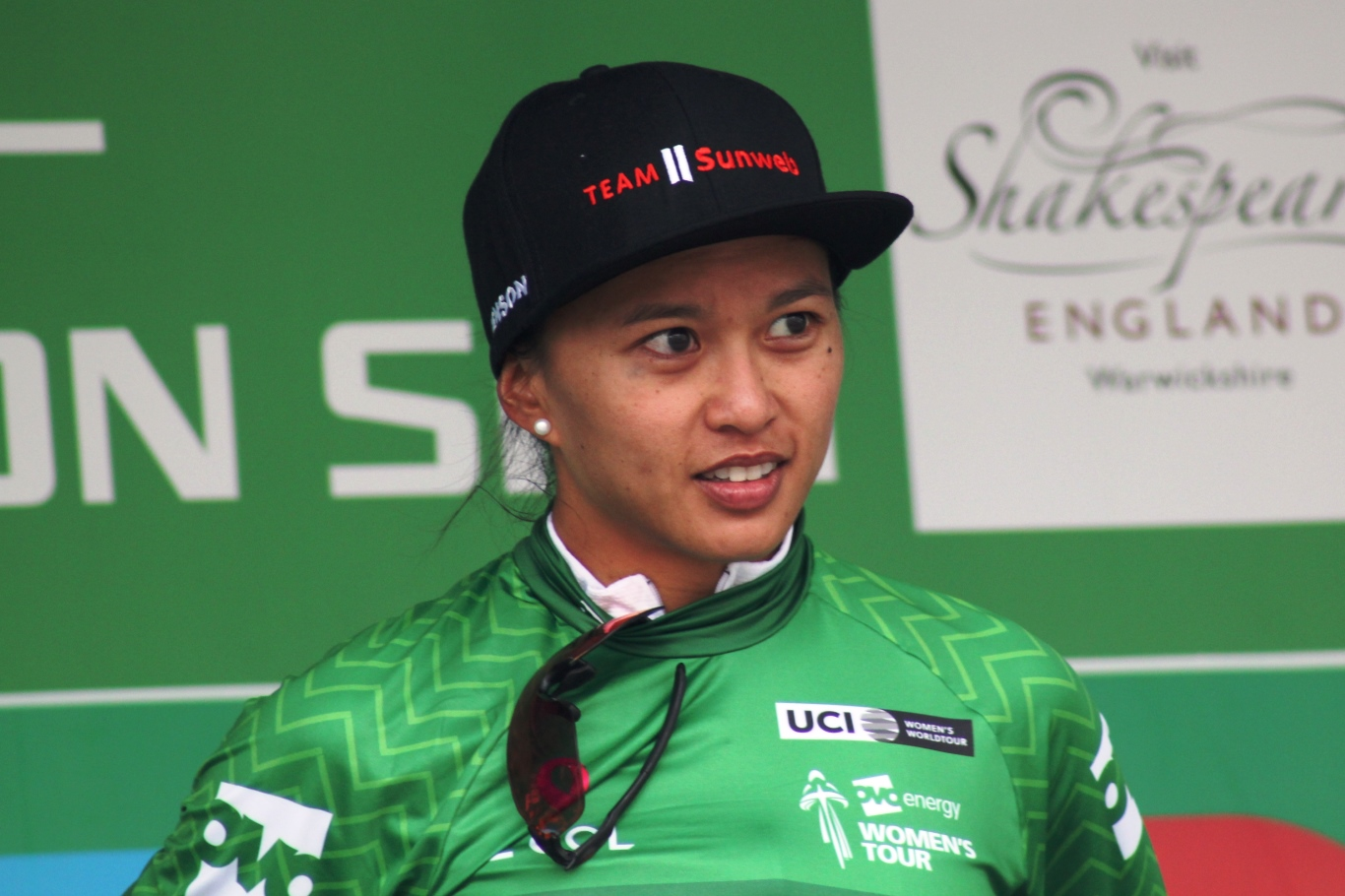
- Labecki at the 2018 The Women's Tour

Personal information
- Nickname: Coco
- Born: Coryn Rivera; August 26, 1992 (age 34) Garden Grove, California, U.S.
- Height: 5 ft 1 in (155 cm)

Cycling career
- Sport: Cycling
- Current team: EF Education–Oatly
- Discipline: Road
- Role: Rider
- Rider type: Sprinter

Amateur teams
- 2009: Metro Volkswagen Cycling Team
- 2009: Proman Hit Squad
- 2010: Peanut Butter & Co. Twenty 12

Professional teams
- 2010–: USA National Team
- 2011–2012: Twenty12
- 2013: Breast Cancer Care Cycling Team
- 2014–2016: UnitedHealthcare
- 2017–2021: Team Sunweb
- 2022–2023: Team Jumbo–Visma
- 2024: EF Education–Cannondale

Major wins
- Major Tours Giro d'Italia 1 individual stage (2021) Stage races The Women's Tour (2018) One-day races and Classics World Team Time Trial Championships (2017) Tour of Flanders for Women (2017) Trofeo Alfredo Binda (2017) Prudential RideLondon Classique (2017)
Medal record
Women's road bicycle racing
Representing United States
Pan American Championships
| Silver medal – second place | 2015 León | Road race |

Coryn Labecki (née Rivera; born August 26, 1992) is a former American racing cyclist of Filipino descent, who last rode for UCI Women's Continental Team EF Education–Oatly. She was previously a member of Jumbo-Visma from 2022 to 2023 and Team DSM from 2017 to 2021.

Labecki won 74 national titles. She won her first elite level national championship with the 2014 USA National Criterium Championships. In 2017, she won the World Team Time Trial Championships, the Tour of Flanders for Women, the Trofeo Alfredo Binda, and the Prudential RideLondon Classique. In 2018, she won the Elite Women's Road Race USA national title and the Tour of Britain Women. Most recently, she won the US National Criterium Championships in 2023 and 2024.

== Major results ==
=== Road ===
2006
National Junior Road Championships

1st Road race
1st Time trial
1st Criterium

2007
National Debutant Road Championships

1st Road race
1st Time trial
1st Criterium

1st Criterium, California State Championships
1st Overall Le Tour de L'Avenir du Saguenay
2008
National Novice Road Championships

1st Road race
1st Time trial

1st Criterium, California State Championships
2009
National Junior Road Championships

1st Road race
2nd Time trial

1st Cascade Cycling Classic Criterium
1st San Rafael Twilight Criterium
1st Manhattan Beach Grand Prix
1st San Pedro Grand Prix
2010
National Junior Road Championships

1st Road race
1st Time trial
1st Criterium

1st Sacramento Grand Prix
1st Stage 3 Tulsa Tough
3rd Road race, UCI Juniors Road World Championships
3rd Dana Point Grand Prix
2011
1st Criterium, National Under-23 Road Championships
1st Criterium, California State Championships
1st Pittsburgh Twilight Criterium
1st San Rafael Twilight Criterium
1st Watsonville Strawberry Criterium
2nd Quad Cities Criterium
7th Overall Tour Féminin en Limousin

1st Young rider classification
1st Stage 1

2012
National Collegiate Road Championships

1st Team time trial (with Sinead Miller, Jackie Kurth & Kaitlin Antonneau)
1st Team road race

2013
5th Sparkassen Giro Bochum
2014
1st Criterium, National Road Championships
1st River Parks Criterium
1st River Parks Omnium
1st Tour of Utah
1st Tour de Lafayette
1st Tour de Francis Park
1st Giro della Montagna
1st TD Bank Mayor's Cup
North Star Grand Prix

1st Sprints classification
1st Stages 2 & 4

6th La Course by Le Tour de France
2015
1st Overall Armed Forces Association Cycling Classic

1st Crystal Cup

Redlands Bicycle Classic

1st Stages 4 & 5

1st Stage 5 Thüringen Rundfahrt der Frauen
1st Stage 3 Women's USA Pro Cycling Challenge
2nd Road race, Pan American Road Championships
2nd Road race, National Road Championships
4th Omloop van het Hageland
4th Winston-Salem Cycling Classic
5th Philadelphia Cycling Classic
6th Overall Joe Martin Stage Race

1st Points classification
1st Stage 3

2016
1st Overall Joe Martin Stage Race

1st Points classification
1st Stages 2 & 3

1st Charlotte Criterium
1st Cannon Falls Road Race, North Star Bicycle Festival
1st Clarendon Cup
1st Stage 1 Tour Femenino de San Luis
2nd Road race, National Road Championships
2nd Gran Prix San Luis Femenino
3rd Winston-Salem Cycling Classic
9th Overall Tour of California
9th Acht van Westerveld
10th Overall Thüringen Rundfahrt der Frauen

1st Stage 7

2017
1st Team time trial, UCI Road World Championships
1st Trofeo Alfredo Binda-Comune di Cittiglio
1st Tour of Flanders for Women
1st Prudential RideLondon Classique
1st East West Bikes Anniversary Challenge
2nd Road race, National Road Championships
2nd Women's Tour de Yorkshire
2nd Madrid Challenge by La Vuelta
3rd Gent–Wevelgem
4th Acht van Westerveld
4th Erondegemse Pijl
6th Overall Tour of California

1st Stage 3

6th Overall Belgium Tour
6th Amstel Gold Race
7th La Flèche Wallonne Féminine
2018
1st Road race, National Road Championships
1st Overall The Women's Tour

1st Sprints classification
1st Stage 2

Ladies Tour of Norway

1st Team time trial
3rd Overall Stage race

2nd Overall Madrid Challenge by La Vuelta

1st Stage 1 (TTT)

Open de Suède Vårgårda

2nd Team time trial
8th Road race

3rd Team time trial, UCI Road World Championships
3rd GP de Plouay – Bretagne
4th Overall Thüringen Rundfahrt der Frauen

1st Points classification
1st Stages 1 & 3

5th Omloop Het Nieuwsblad
6th Ronde van Drenthe
6th Prudential RideLondon Classique
2019
2nd Road race, National Road Championships
2nd Overall Ladies Tour of Norway
2nd GP de Plouay – Bretagne
3rd Brabantse Pijl
3rd RideLondon Classique
3rd MerXem Classic
3rd Postnord UCI WWT Vårgårda West Sweden TTT
4th Overall Belgium Tour

1st Points classification
1st Stages 3 & 4

8th Trofeo Alfredo Binda-Comune di Cittiglio
10th Road race, UCI Road World Championships
2021
1st Stage 10 Giro Rosa
2nd Road race, National Road Championships
7th Road race, Summer Olympics
8th GP de Plouay
10th Road race, UCI Road World Championships
2022
6th Trofeo Alfredo Binda-Comune di Cittiglio
9th Amstel Gold Race

2023
National Road Championships

1st Criterium, National Road Championships
2nd Road Race

1st Stage 1 (ITT) La Vuelta
3rd Stage 1 Setmana Ciclista-Volta Comunitat Valenciana Fèmines
8th Mixed relay TTT, World Championships

2024
National Road Championships

1st Criterium
9th ITT

==== Classics results timeline ====
Monuments results timeline
| Monument | 2015 | 2016 | 2017 | 2018 | 2019 | 2020 | 2021 | 2022 |
| Tour of Flanders | — | 16 | 1 | 34 | DNF | 45 | — | 73 |
| Liège–Bastogne–Liège | Did not exist | | — | — | 77 | — | — | — |
Classics results timeline
| Classic | 2015 | 2016 | 2017 | 2018 | 2019 | 2020 | 2021 | 2022 |
| Omloop Het Nieuwsblad | 28 | 80 | — | 5 | — | 34 | — | — |
| Strade Bianche Donne | — | — | 41 | DNF | 60 | DNF | — | 21 |
| Ronde van Drenthe | 42 | DNF | 29 | 6 | — | NH | — | — |
| Classic Brugge–De Panne | Did not exist | | | 14 | — | — | — | — |
| Gent–Wevelgem | — | 41 | 3 | 69 | 23 | 67 | — | 39 |
| Trofeo Alfredo Binda-Comune di Cittiglio | — | 11 | 1 | 15 | 8 | NH | — | 6 |
| Amstel Gold Race | Did not exist | | 6 | 60 | DNF | NH | 26 | 9 |
| La Flèche Wallonne | — | — | 7 | DNF | DNF | — | 40 | — |
| GP de Plouay – Bretagne | — | — | 26 | 3 | 2 | — | 8 | |
| Open de Suède Vårgårda | — | — | — | 8 | 49 | Not held | | |

Legend
| — | Did not compete |
| DNF | Did not finish |
| NH | Not held |

=== Track ===
2006
1st Team sprint, National Junior Championships (with Colleen Hayduk)
2007
National Debutant Championships

1st Team sprint
1st Omnium

1st Omnium, California State Championships
2008
1st Team sprint, National Junior Championships (with Colleen Hayduk)
National Novice Championships

1st 500m time trial
1st Scratch
1st Points race
1st Omnium
2nd Sprint

California State Championships

1st Omnium
1st Team sprint (with Christine Barron)

2009
National Junior Championships

1st Individual pursuit
1st Team sprint
2nd Points race

2010
National Junior Championships

1st Keirin
1st Points race
1st Individual pursuit
1st Sprint
2nd Scratch
3rd Team sprint

3rd Omnium, UCI Junior Track Cycling World Championships
2011
National Collegiate Championships

1st Omnium
1st Team omnium
1st Individual pursuit
1st Team pursuit
1st Points race
1st Sprint

=== Cyclo-cross ===
2006
1st Debutants race, National Championships
1st California State Championships
2007
1st Debutants race, National Championships
1st California State Championships
2008
1st Junior race, National Championships
1st California State Championships
2009
1st Junior race, National Championships
2012
1st National Collegiate Championships
National Championships

2nd Under-23 race
5th Elite race
