= 2019 RideLondon Classique =

2019 UCI Women's World Tour, race 16 of 23
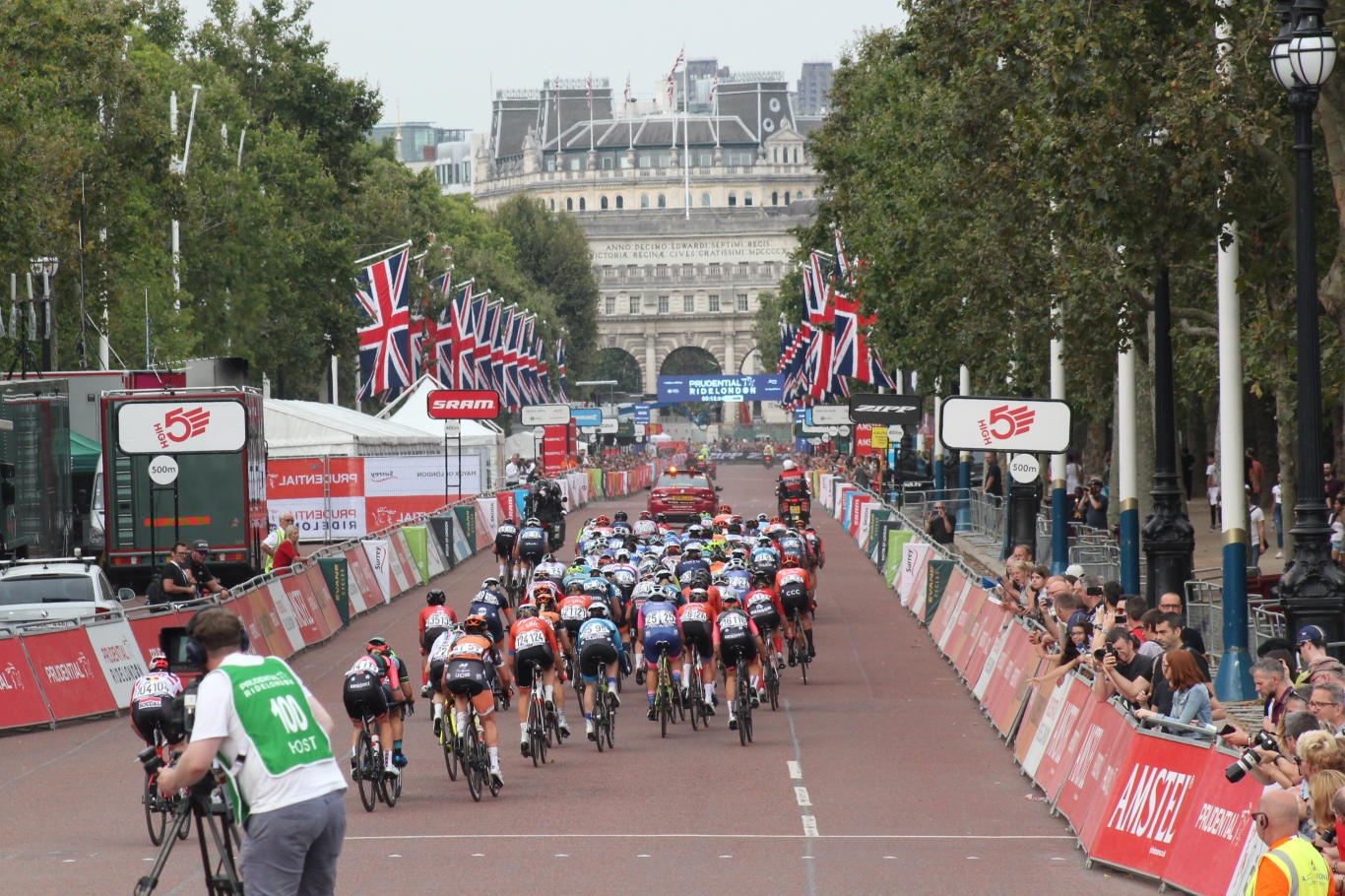
- The race started and finished on The Mall

Race details
- Dates: 3 August 2019
- Stages: 1
- Distance: 68 km (42 mi)
- Winning time: 1h 33' 56"

Results
	Winner	Lorena Wiebes (NED)	(Parkhotel Valkenburg)
	Second	Elisa Balsamo (ITA)	(Valcar–Cylance)
	Third	Coryn Rivera (USA)	(Team Sunweb)
	Sprints	Susanne Andersen (NOR)	(Team Sunweb)
	Combativity	Maëlle Grossetête (FRA)	(FDJ Nouvelle-Aquitaine Futuroscope)

The seventh edition of the Prudential RideLondon Classique was a UCI Women's WorldTour race on the Saturday evening on a 3.4 km circuit in central London, beginning and finishing on The Mall. The women's elite race, previously known as the Grand Prix pro race, was given UCI World Tour Status in 2016 and has the highest ever value prize money for a women's one-day race.

It was won by Lorena Wiebes after Kirsten Wild, who passed the finish first, was disqualified for causing a crash in the sprint.

== Teams ==
Sixteen teams professional teams each with a maximum of six riders, will start the race:

Professional women's teams

- Boels–Dolmans
- Canyon//SRAM
- Trek–Segafredo
- Parkhotel Valkenburg
- FDJ Nouvelle-Aquitaine Futuroscope
- Team Sunweb
- Alé–Cipollini
- CCC - Liv
- WNT–Rotor Pro Cycling
- Valcar–Cylance
- Tibco–Silicon Valley Bank
- Drops
- Hitec Products–Birk Sport
- Lotto–Soudal Ladies
- Rally UHC Cycling
- Team Virtu Cycling

== Results ==
Result
Rank	Rider	Team	Time
1	Lorena Wiebes (NED)	Parkhotel Valkenburg	1h 33' 55"
2	Elisa Balsamo (ITA)	Valcar–Cylance	s.t.
3	Coryn Rivera (USA)	Team Sunweb	s.t.
4	Lotte Kopecky (BEL)	Lotto–Soudal Ladies	s.t.
5	Letizia Paternoster (ITA)	Trek–Segafredo	s.t.
6	Marianne Vos (NED)	CCC - Liv	s.t.
7	Christine Majerus (LUX)	Boels–Dolmans	s.t.
8	Marta Tagliaferro (ITA)	Hitec Products–Birk Sport	s.t.
9	Maria Giulia Confalonieri (ITA)	Valcar–Cylance	s.t.
10	Eugénie Duval (FRA)	FDJ Nouvelle-Aquitaine Futuroscope	s.t.

== See also ==
- 2019 in women's road cycling
