= 2019 Ladies Tour of Norway =

2019 UCI Women's World Tour, race 19 of 23

Race details
- Dates: 22–25 August 2019
- Stages: 4

Results
Jersey awarded to the overall winner	Winner	Marianne Vos (NED)	(CCC - Liv)
	Second	Coryn Rivera (USA)	(Team Sunweb)
	Third	Leah Kirchmann (CAN)	(Team Sunweb)
Jersey awarded to the points classification winner	Points	Emilie Moberg (SWE)	(Team Virtu Cycling)
Jersey awarded to the mountains classification winner	Mountains	Soraya Paladin (ITA)	(Alé–Cipollini)
Jersey awarded to the youth classification winner	Youth	Lorena Wiebes (NED)	(Parkhotel Valkenburg)
	Team	Team Sunweb	

The 2019 Ladies Tour of Norway is the seventh edition of the Ladies Tour of Norway, a women's cycling stage race in Norway and part of the 2019 UCI Women's World Tour.

== Teams ==
Nineteen professional teams, and one national team, each with a maximum of six riders, will start the race:

Professional women's teams

- Trek–Segafredo
- Rally UHC Cycling
- Parkhotel Valkenburg
- Doltcini–Van Eyck Sport
- CCC - Liv
- Movistar Team
- Tibco–Silicon Valley Bank
- Team Virtu Cycling
- BTC City Ljubljana
- Valcar–Cylance
- Bepink
- FDJ Nouvelle-Aquitaine Futuroscope
- Alé–Cipollini
- Mitchelton–Scott
- Canyon//SRAM
- Team Sunweb
- Boels–Dolmans
- Drops
- Hitec Products–Birk Sport

National teams:

- Norway

== Stages ==
=== Stage 1 ===
22 August 2019 – Åsgårdstrand to Horten, 128 km (79.5 mi)

Stage 1 result
Rank	Rider	Team	Time
1	Lorena Wiebes (NED)	Parkhotel Valkenburg	3h 16' 27"
2	Chloe Hosking (AUS)	Alé–Cipollini	+ 0"
3	Amalie Dideriksen (DEN)	Boels–Dolmans	+ 0"
4	Letizia Paternoster (ITA)	Trek–Segafredo	+ 0"
5	Marianne Vos (NED)	CCC - Liv	+ 0"
6	Susanne Andersen (NOR)	Team Sunweb	+ 0"
7	Sheyla Gutiérrez Ruiz (ESP)	Movistar Team	+ 0"
8	Sarah Roy (AUS)	Mitchelton–Scott	+ 0"
9	Marta Bastianelli (ITA)	Team Virtu Cycling	+ 0"
10	Eugénie Duval (FRA)	FDJ Nouvelle-Aquitaine Futuroscope	+ 0"

General classification after Stage 1
Rank	Rider	Team	Time
1	Lorena Wiebes (NED)	Parkhotel Valkenburg	3h 16' 17"
2	Chloe Hosking (AUS)	Alé–Cipollini	+ 4"
3	Amalie Dideriksen (DEN)	Boels–Dolmans	+ 6"
4	Letizia Paternoster (ITA)	Trek–Segafredo	+ 10"
5	Marianne Vos (NED)	CCC - Liv	+ 10"
6	Susanne Andersen (NOR)	Team Sunweb	+ 10"
7	Sheyla Gutiérrez Ruiz (ESP)	Movistar Team	+ 10"
8	Sarah Roy (AUS)	Mitchelton–Scott	+ 10"
9	Marta Bastianelli (ITA)	Team Virtu Cycling	+ 10"
10	Eugénie Duval (FRA)	FDJ Nouvelle-Aquitaine Futuroscope	+ 10"

=== Stage 2 ===
23 August 2019 – Mysen to Askim, 131 km (81.4 mi)

Stage 2 result
Rank	Rider	Team	Time
1	Marianne Vos (NED)	CCC - Liv	3h 19' 33"
2	Alice Barnes (UK)	Canyon//SRAM	+ 0"
3	Marta Bastianelli (ITA)	Team Virtu Cycling	+ 0"
4	Coryn Rivera (USA)	Team Sunweb	+ 0"
5	Letizia Paternoster (ITA)	Trek–Segafredo	+ 0"
6	Chloe Hosking (AUS)	Alé–Cipollini	+ 0"
7	Lorena Wiebes (NED)	Parkhotel Valkenburg	+ 0"
8	Aude Biannic (FRA)	FDJ Nouvelle-Aquitaine Futuroscope	+ 0"
9	Eugenia Bujak (SLO)	BTC City Ljubljana	+ 0"
10	Ilaria Sanguineti (ITA)	Valcar–Cylance	+ 0"

General classification after Stage 2
Rank	Rider	Team	Time
1	Marianne Vos (NED)	CCC - Liv	6h 35' 50"
2	Lorena Wiebes (NED)	Parkhotel Valkenburg	+ 0"
3	Chloe Hosking (AUS)	Alé–Cipollini	+ 4"
4	Marta Bastianelli (ITA)	Team Virtu Cycling	+ 6"
5	Amalie Dideriksen (DEN)	Boels–Dolmans	+ 6"
6	Letizia Paternoster (ITA)	Trek–Segafredo	+ 10"
7	Aude Biannic (FRA)	FDJ Nouvelle-Aquitaine Futuroscope	+ 10"
8	Eugenia Bujak (SLO)	BTC City Ljubljana	+ 10"
9	Floortje Mackaij (NED)	Team Sunweb	+ 10"
10	Sheyla Gutiérrez Ruiz (ESP)	Movistar Team	+ 10"

=== Stage 3 ===
24 August 2019 – Moss to Halden, 125 km (77.7 mi)

Stage 3 result
Rank	Rider	Team	Time
1	Marianne Vos (NED)	CCC - Liv	3h 24' 20"
2	Coryn Rivera (USA)	Team Sunweb	+ 4"
3	Demi Vollering (NED)	Parkhotel Valkenburg	+ 11"
4	Leah Kirchmann (CAN)	Team Sunweb	+ 11"
5	Katarzyna Niewiadoma (POL)	Canyon//SRAM	+ 11"
6	Lucy Kennedy (AUS)	Alé–Cipollini	+ 12"
7	Floortje Mackaij (NED)	Team Sunweb	+ 15"
8	Mavi García (ESP)	Movistar Team	+ 17"
9	Soraya Paladin (ITA)	Alé–Cipollini	+ 17"
10	Vita Heine (NOR)	Hitec Products–Birk Sport	+ 17"

General classification after Stage 3
Rank	Rider	Team	Time
1	Marianne Vos (NED)	CCC - Liv	10h 00' 00"
2	Coryn Rivera (USA)	Team Sunweb	+ 18"
3	Leah Kirchmann (CAN)	Team Sunweb	+ 31"
4	Katarzyna Niewiadoma (POL)	Canyon//SRAM	+ 31"
5	Lorena Wiebes (NED)	Parkhotel Valkenburg	+ 32"
6	Floortje Mackaij (NED)	Team Sunweb	+ 35"
7	Christine Majerus (LUX)	Boels–Dolmans	+ 45"
8	Marta Bastianelli (ITA)	Team Virtu Cycling	+ 48"
9	Riejanne Markus (NED)	CCC - Liv	+ 50"
10	Hanna Nilsson (SWE)	BTC City Ljubljana	+ 50"

=== Stage 4 ===
25 August 2019 – Svinesund to Halden, 154 km (95.7 mi)

Stage 4 result
Rank	Rider	Team	Time
1	Marianne Vos (NED)	CCC - Liv	3h 52' 24"
2	Marta Bastianelli (ITA)	Team Virtu Cycling	+ 0"
3	Ilaria Sanguineti (ITA)	Valcar–Cylance	+ 0"
4	Chloe Hosking (AUS)	Alé–Cipollini	+ 0"
5	Alice Barnes (UK)	Canyon//SRAM	+ 0"
6	Leah Kirchmann (CAN)	Team Sunweb	+ 0"
7	Coryn Rivera (USA)	Team Sunweb	+ 0"
8	Silvia Persico (ITA)	Valcar–Cylance	+ 0"
9	Lorena Wiebes (NED)	Parkhotel Valkenburg	+ 0"
10	Christine Majerus (LUX)	Boels–Dolmans	+ 0"

General classification after Stage 4
Rank	Rider	Team	Time
1	Marianne Vos (NED)	CCC - Liv	13h 52' 14"
2	Coryn Rivera (USA)	Team Sunweb	+ 29"
3	Leah Kirchmann (CAN)	Team Sunweb	+ 41"
4	Katarzyna Niewiadoma (POL)	Canyon//SRAM	+ 41"
5	Lorena Wiebes (NED)	Parkhotel Valkenburg	+ 42"
6	Floortje Mackaij (NED)	Team Sunweb	+ 45"
7	Marta Bastianelli (ITA)	Team Virtu Cycling	+ 52"
8	Christine Majerus (LUX)	Boels–Dolmans	+ 55"
9	Hanna Nilsson (SWE)	BTC City Ljubljana	+ 1' 00"
10	Eugénie Duval (FRA)	FDJ Nouvelle-Aquitaine Futuroscope	+ 1' 02"

== Classification progress ==
Stage	Winner	General classification	Points classification	Mountains classification	Intermediate sprints classification	Youth classification	Norwegian rider classification	Team classification
1	Lorena Wiebes	Lorena Wiebes	Lorena Wiebes	Soraya Paladin	Lisa Klein	Lorena Wiebes	Susanne Andersen	Team Sunweb
2	Marianne Vos	Marianne Vos	Emilie Moberg	Soraya Paladin		Lorena Wiebes	Susanne Andersen	Team Sunweb
3	Marianne Vos	Marianne Vos	Emilie Moberg	Soraya Paladin		Lorena Wiebes	Susanne Andersen	Team Sunweb
4	Marianne Vos	Marianne Vos	Emilie Moberg	Soraya Paladin		Lorena Wiebes		
Final		Marianne Vos	Emilie Moberg	Soraya Paladin		Lorena Wiebes		
