= 2019 Three Days of Bruges–De Panne (women's race) =

2019 Women's Three Days of Bruges–De Panne
2019 UCI Women's World Tour, race 4 of 23
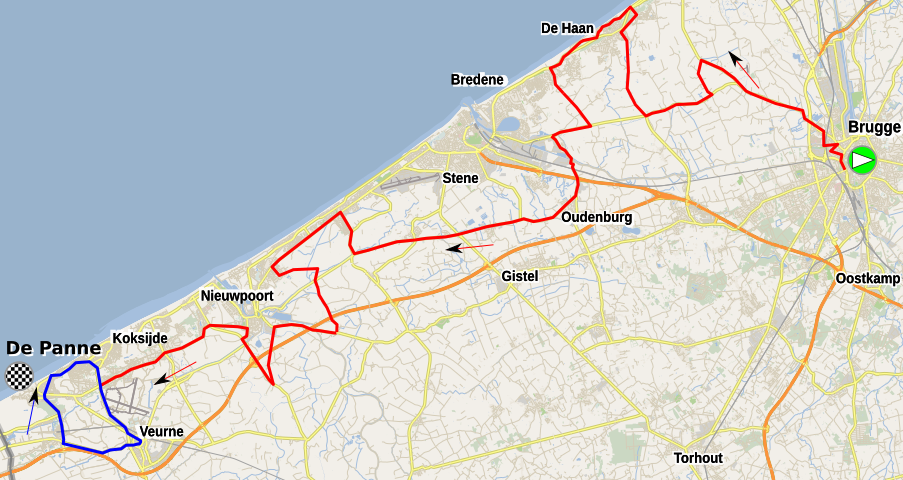

Race details
- Dates: 28 March 2019
- Stages: 1
- Distance: 134.4 km (83.5 mi)
- Winning time: 3h 13' 07"

Results
	Winner	Kirsten Wild (NED)	(WNT–Rotor Pro Cycling)
	Second	Lorena Wiebes (NED)	(Parkhotel Valkenburg)
	Third	Lotte Kopecky (BEL)	(Lotto–Soudal Ladies)

Youtube race summary

The second running of the women's event of the Three Days of Bruges–De Panne, also called Lotto Women Classic Bruges–De Panne, was held on 28 March 2019. The race started in Bruges and finished in De Panne with two 15 km (9.3 mi) loops between De Panne and Koksijde, totalling 134.4 km (83.5 mi). It was the fourth leg of the 2019 UCI Women's World Tour. Defending champion Jolien D'Hoore did not compete after breaking her collar bone in the Drentse 8.

The race was tightly controlled from the start and no breakaway managed to stay away. With 35km to go, Lizzy Banks crashed and took Elisa Longo Borghini down with her. Longo Borghini, frustrated by the crash, threw Banks' bike on the pavement after untangling the bikes. After the race, she issued a public apology for this. The race finished in a bunch sprint won by Kirsten Wild.

== Teams ==
20 teams competed in the race.

Professional women's teams

- Alé–Cipollini
- Astana
- Bigla Pro Cycling
- Boels–Dolmans
- Canyon//SRAM
- CCC - Liv
- Doltcini–Van Eyck Sport
- FDJ Nouvelle-Aquitaine Futuroscope
- Health Mate–Cyclelive Team
- Lotto–Soudal Ladies
- Mitchelton–Scott
- Movistar Team
- Parkhotel Valkenburg
- Team Sunweb
- Tibco–Silicon Valley Bank
- Team Virtu Cycling
- Trek–Segafredo
- Valcar–Cylance
- WNT–Rotor Pro Cycling
- BTC City Ljubljana

== Result ==
Final general classification

Rank	Rider	Team	Time
1	Kirsten Wild (NED)	WNT–Rotor Pro Cycling	3h 13' 07"
2	Lorena Wiebes (NED)	Parkhotel Valkenburg	s.t.
3	Lotte Kopecky (BEL)	Lotto–Soudal Ladies	s.t.
4	Lotta Lepistö (FIN)	Trek–Segafredo	s.t.
5	Susanne Andersen (NOR)	Team Sunweb	s.t.
6	Elisa Balsamo (ITA)	Valcar–Cylance	s.t.
7	Marta Bastianelli (ITA)	Team Virtu Cycling	s.t.
8	Emilia Fahlin (SWE)	FDJ Nouvelle-Aquitaine Futuroscope	s.t.
9	Arlenis Sierra (CUB)	Astana	s.t.
10	Marianne Vos (NED)	CCC - Liv	s.t.
