= 2019 Trofeo Alfredo Binda-Comune di Cittiglio =

2019 UCI Women's World Tour, race 3 of 23
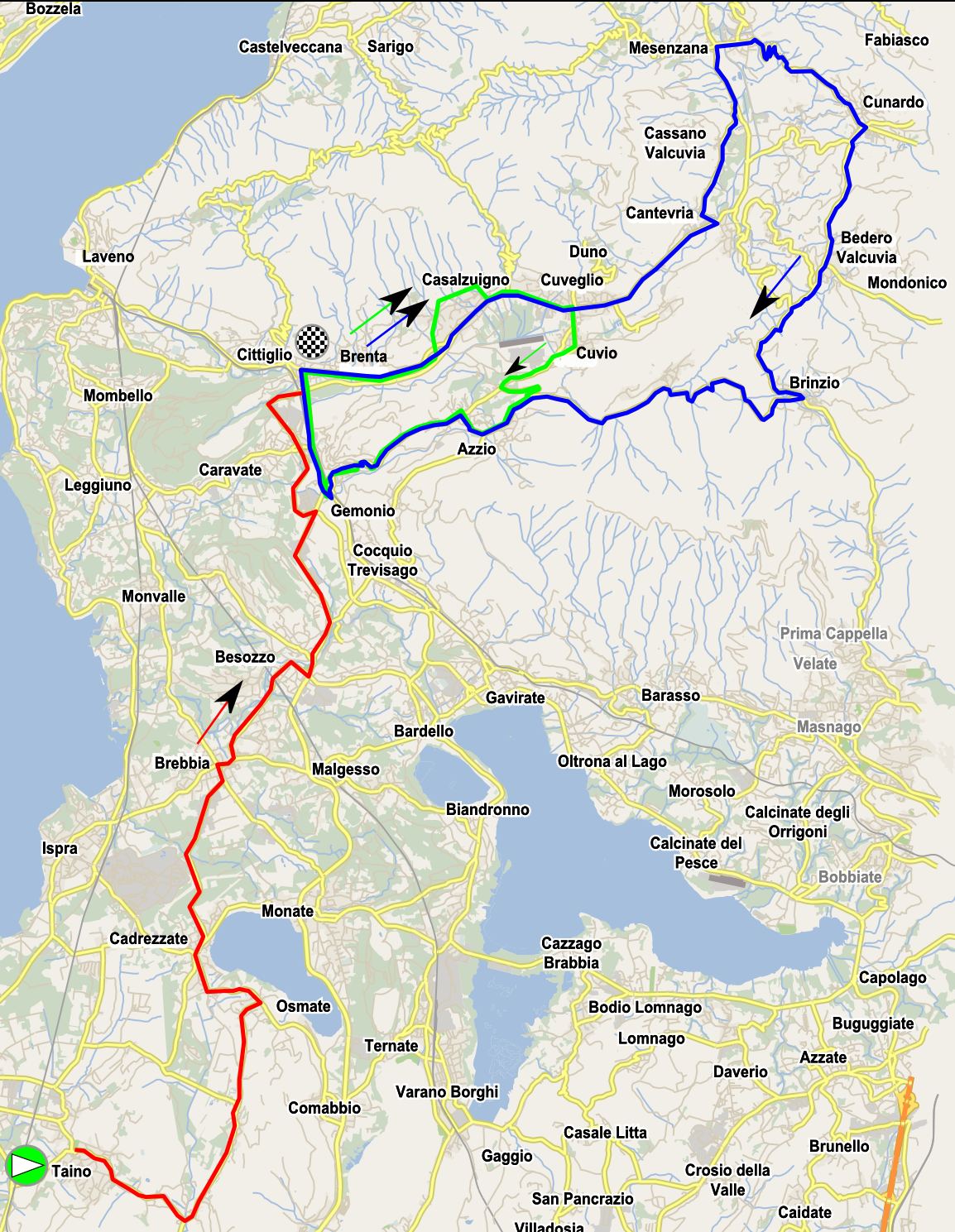
- Route of the event

Race details
- Dates: 24 March 2018
- Distance: 131.1 km (81.5 mi)
- Winning time: 3h 27' 07"

Results
| | Winner | Marianne Vos (NED) | (CCC - Liv) |
| | Second | Amanda Spratt (AUS) | (Mitchelton–Scott) |
| | Third | Cecilie Uttrup Ludwig (DEN) | (Bigla Pro Cycling) |

Youtube race summary

The 2019 Trofeo Alfredo Binda-Comune di Cittiglio was the 44th running of the Trofeo Alfredo Binda, a women's cycling race in Italy. It was the third event of the 2019 UCI Women's World Tour season and was held on 24 March 2019. The race started in Gavirate and finished in Cittiglio, on the outskirts of Lago Maggiore in Northwest Italy.

Marianne Vos won the race for the fourth time and is now tied with Maria Canins for most wins.

== Teams ==
24 teams competed in the race.

Professional women's teams

- Alé–Cipollini
- Astana
- Bigla Pro Cycling
- Boels–Dolmans
- Canyon//SRAM
- CCC - Liv
- FDJ Nouvelle-Aquitaine Futuroscope
- Mitchelton–Scott
- Movistar Team
- Parkhotel Valkenburg
- Team Sunweb
- Tibco–Silicon Valley Bank
- Trek–Segafredo
- Valcar–Cylance
- WNT–Rotor Pro Cycling
- Aromitalia–Basso Bikes–Vaiano
- Bepink
- BTC City Ljubljana
- Eurotarget–Bianchi–Vittoria
- Servetto–Piumate–Beltrami TSA
- Top Girls Fassa Bortolo
- Team Virtu Cycling

== Result ==
Final general classification

| Rank | Rider | Team | Time |
|---|---|---|---|
| 1 | Marianne Vos (NED) | CCC - Liv | 3h 27' 07" |
| 2 | Amanda Spratt (AUS) | Mitchelton–Scott | s.t. |
| 3 | Cecilie Uttrup Ludwig (DEN) | Bigla Pro Cycling | s.t. |
| 4 | Anastasiia Chursina (RUS) | BTC City Ljubljana | s.t. |
| 5 | Elena Cecchini (ITA) | Canyon//SRAM | + 1" |
| 6 | Katarzyna Niewiadoma (POL) | Canyon//SRAM | s.t. |
| 7 | Emilia Fahlin (SWE) | FDJ Nouvelle-Aquitaine Futuroscope | s.t. |
| 8 | Coryn Rivera (USA) | Team Sunweb | s.t. |
| 9 | Soraya Paladin (ITA) | Alé–Cipollini | s.t. |
| 10 | Erica Magnaldi (ITA) | WNT–Rotor Pro Cycling | s.t. |

== See also ==
- 2019 in women's road cycling
