= 2019 Postnord UCI WWT Vårgårda West Sweden =

2019 UCI Women's World Tour, race 18 of 23

Race details
- Dates: 18 August 2019
- Stages: 1
- Distance: 145.3 km (90.3 mi)
- Winning time: 3h 37' 43"

Results
	Winner	Marta Bastianelli (ITA)	(Team Virtu Cycling)
	Second	Marianne Vos (NED)	(CCC - Liv)
	Third	Lorena Wiebes (NED)	(Parkhotel Valkenburg)

The 2019 Postnord UCI WWT Vårgårda West Sweden was a women's bicycle race and was the 18th round of the 2019 UCI Women's World Tour. It was held on 18 August 2019, in Vårgårda, Sweden, the day after the 2019 Postnord UCI WWT Vårgårda West Sweden TTT.

The road race covered 145.3 km starting and finishing in Vårgårda and included eight gravel sections.

== Teams ==
Fifteen professional teams, and two national teams, each with a maximum of six riders, started the race:

Professional women's teams

- Alé–Cipollini
- Boels–Dolmans
- BTC City Ljubljana
- Canyon//SRAM
- CCC - Liv
- FDJ Nouvelle-Aquitaine Futuroscope
- Mitchelton–Scott
- Movistar Team
- Parkhotel Valkenburg
- Team Sunweb
- Tibco–Silicon Valley Bank
- Team Virtu Cycling
- Valcar–Cylance
- Trek–Segafredo
- WNT–Rotor Pro Cycling

National teams:

- Sweden
- Norway

== Results ==
Final general classification

Rank	Rider	Team	Time
1	Marta Bastianelli (ITA)	Team Virtu Cycling	3h 37' 43"
2	Marianne Vos (NED)	CCC - Liv	s.t.
3	Lorena Wiebes (NED)	Parkhotel Valkenburg	s.t.
4	Chloe Hosking (AUS)	Alé–Cipollini	s.t
5	Amy Pieters (NED)	Boels–Dolmans	+ 1"
6	Marta Cavalli (ITA)	Valcar–Cylance	+ 2"
7	Maria Giulia Confalonieri (ITA)	Valcar–Cylance	+ 3"
8	Ruth Winder (USA)	Trek–Segafredo	s.t.
9	Stine Borgli (NOR)	FDJ Nouvelle-Aquitaine Futuroscope	s.t.
10	Leah Kirchmann (CAN)	Team Sunweb	s.t.
