= 2019 Ronde van Drenthe =

2019 UCI Women's World Tour, race 2 of 23
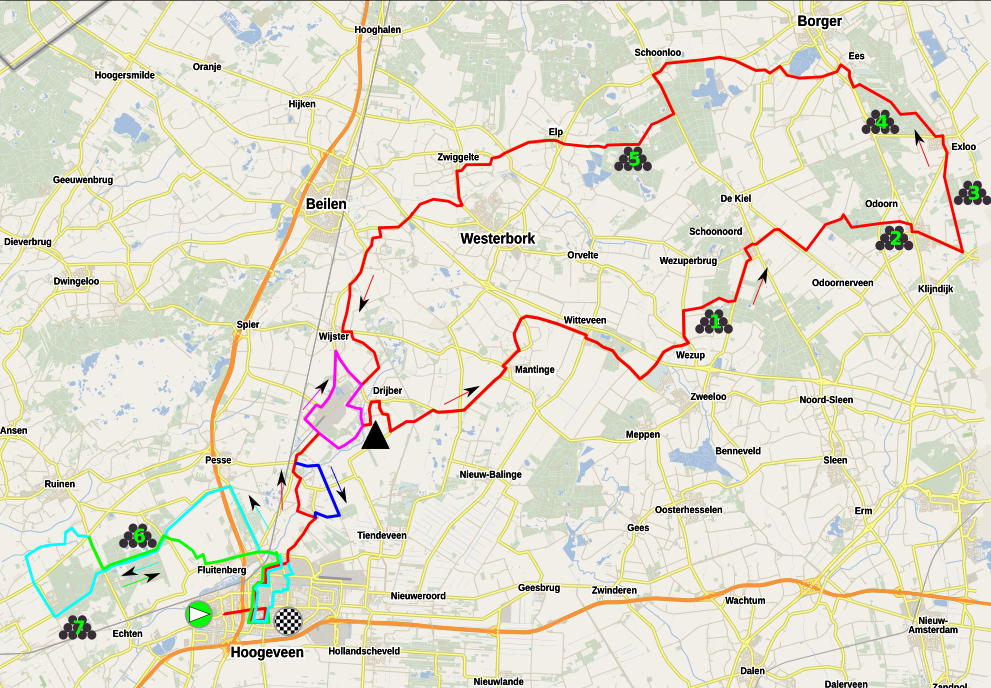
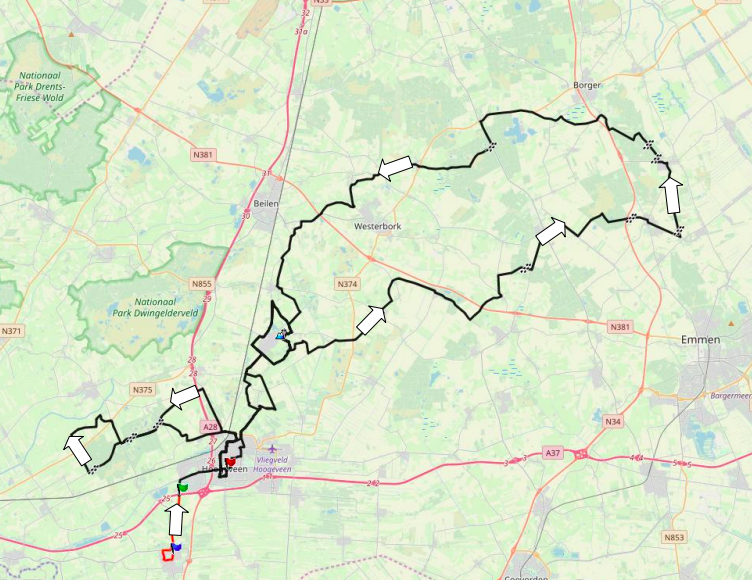
- Route

Race details
- Dates: 17 March 2019
- Stages: 1
- Distance: 165.7 km (103.0 mi)
- Winning time: 4h 24' 14"

Results
	Winner	Marta Bastianelli (ITA)	(Team Virtu Cycling)
	Second	Chantal Blaak (NED)	(Boels–Dolmans)
	Third	Ellen van Dijk (NED)	(Trek–Segafredo)

The 13th edition of the Ronde van Drenthe, a women's cycling race in the Netherlands, was held on 17 March 2019. Italian Marta Bastianelli won the race in a three-way sprint before Dutch riders Chantal Blaak and Ellen van Dijk. The race was held over a distance of 165.7 kilometres (103.0 miles), starting and finishing in Hoogeveen. The race covered 11 cobbled sections and three ascents of the VAM-berg. It was the second race of the 2019 UCI Women's World Tour. It was the longest UCI Women's World Tour race ever.

== Teams ==
20 UCI teams entered the race, as well as a Dutch national team. Each team has a maximum of six riders:

UCI women's teams

- Boels–Dolmans
- Canyon//SRAM
- Alé–Cipollini
- Bigla Pro Cycling
- CCC - Liv
- FDJ Nouvelle-Aquitaine Futuroscope
- Mitchelton–Scott
- Parkhotel Valkenburg
- Tibco–Silicon Valley Bank
- Team Virtu Cycling
- Trek–Segafredo
- Valcar–Cylance
- WNT–Rotor Pro Cycling
- Biehler Pro Cycling
- Bizkaia–Durango
- Hitec Products–Birk Sport
- Lotto–Soudal Ladies
- Movistar Team
- Team Sunweb
- Health Mate–Cyclelive Team

== Result ==
Final general classification

Rank	Rider	Team	Time
1	Marta Bastianelli (ITA)	Team Virtu Cycling	4h 24' 14"
2	Chantal Blaak (NED)	Boels–Dolmans	s.t.
3	Ellen van Dijk (NED)	Trek–Segafredo	s.t.
4	Amy Pieters (NED)	Boels–Dolmans	+ 20"
5	Lotte Kopecky (BEL)	Lotto–Soudal Ladies	s.t.
6	Amalie Dideriksen (DEN)	Boels–Dolmans	s.t.
7	Floortje Mackaij (NED)	Team Sunweb	s.t.
8	Kirsten Wild (NED)	WNT–Rotor Pro Cycling	s.t.
9	Romy Kasper (GER)	Alé–Cipollini	s.t.
10	Jip van den Bos (NED)	Boels–Dolmans	s.t.
