= 2019 Gent–Wevelgem (women's race) =

2019 UCI Women's World Tour, race 5 of 23
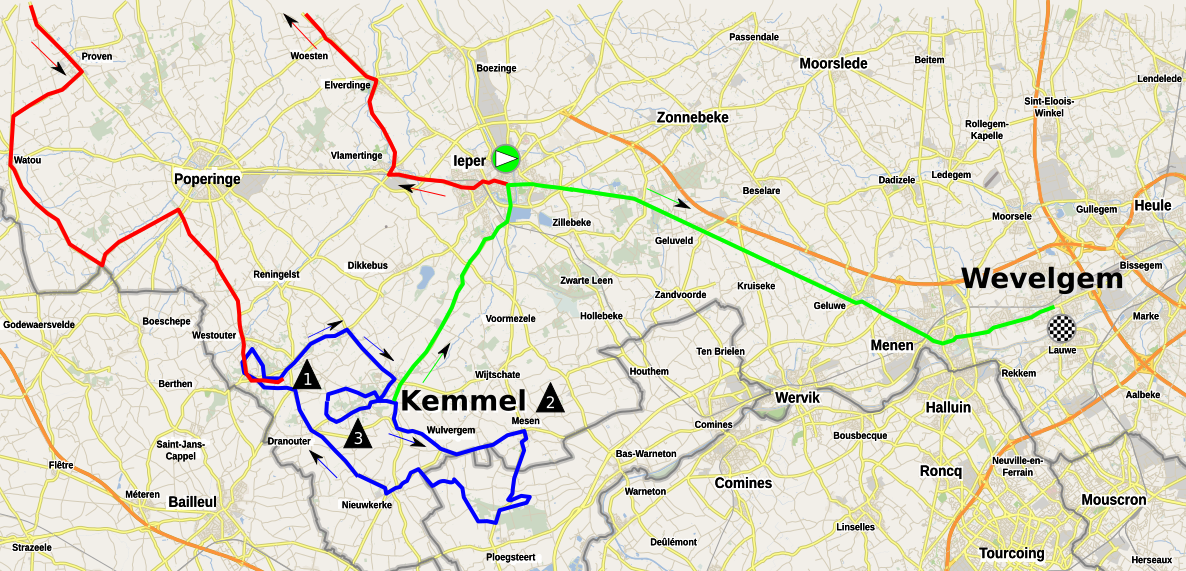

Race details
- Dates: 31 March 2019
- Stages: 1
- Distance: 136.9 km (85.1 mi)
- Winning time: 3hr 33' 34"

Results
	Winner	Kirsten Wild (NED)	(WNT–Rotor Pro Cycling)
	Second	Lorena Wiebes (NED)	(Parkhotel Valkenburg)
	Third	Letizia Paternoster (ITA)	(Trek–Segafredo)

Youtube race summary

The eighth running of Gent–Wevelgem's women's race was held on Sunday 31 March 2019. It was the fifth event of the 2019 UCI Women's World Tour. The race started in Ypres and finished in Wevelgem, covering a distance of 136.9 km. Italian Marta Bastianelli won the previous edition in 2018.

== Teams ==
24 teams competed in the race.

Professional women's teams

- Team Virtu Cycling
- Lotto–Soudal Ladies
- Boels–Dolmans
- Alé–Cipollini
- Aromitalia–Basso Bikes–Vaiano
- Astana
- Biehler Pro Cycling
- Bigla Pro Cycling
- BTC City Ljubljana
- Canyon//SRAM
- CCC - Liv
- Doltcini–Van Eyck Sport
- Drops
- FDJ Nouvelle-Aquitaine Futuroscope
- Health Mate–Cyclelive Team
- Hitec Products–Birk Sport
- Mitchelton–Scott
- Movistar Team
- Parkhotel Valkenburg
- Team Sunweb
- Tibco–Silicon Valley Bank
- Trek–Segafredo
- Valcar–Cylance
- WNT–Rotor Pro Cycling

== Results ==
Final general classification

Rank	Rider	Team	Time
1	Kirsten Wild (NED)	WNT–Rotor Pro Cycling	3h 33' 34"
2	Lorena Wiebes (NED)	Parkhotel Valkenburg	s.t.
3	Letizia Paternoster (ITA)	Trek–Segafredo	s.t.
4	Marta Bastianelli (ITA)	Team Virtu Cycling	s.t.
5	Amy Pieters (NED)	Bigla Pro Cycling	s.t.
6	Lotte Kopecky (BEL)	Lotto–Soudal Ladies	s.t.
7	Michela Balducci (ITA)	Aromitalia–Basso Bikes–Vaiano	s.t.
8	Elena Cecchini (ITA)	Canyon//SRAM	s.t.
9	Elisa Balsamo (ITA)	Valcar–Cylance	s.t.
10	Marta Cavalli (ITA)	Valcar–Cylance	s.t.

== See also ==
- 2019 in women's road cycling
