= Team VéloCONCEPT =

Team Véloconcept may refer to:

- Team VéloCONCEPT (men's team), a professional cycling team that competes on the UCI Continental Circuits.
- Team VéloCONCEPT Women, a professional cycling team that competes on the UCI Women's World Tour.
