= 2019 Strade Bianche Women =

2019 UCI Women's World Tour, race 1 of 23
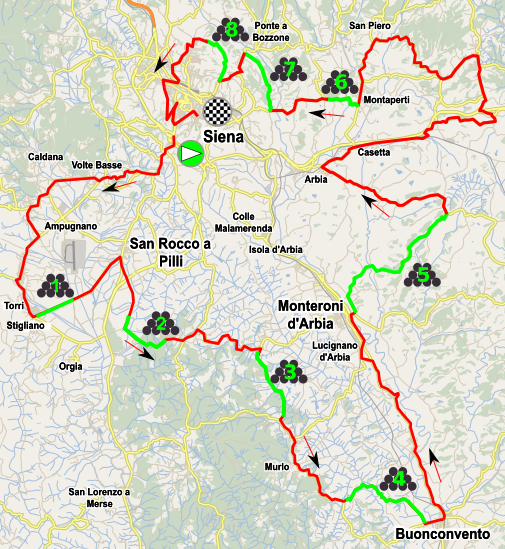

Race details
- Dates: 9 March 2019
- Stages: 1
- Distance: 136 km (85 mi)
- Winning time: 3h 48' 49"

Results
	Winner	Annemiek van Vleuten (NED)	(Mitchelton–BikeExchange)
	Second	Annika Langvad (DEN)	(Boels–Dolmans)
	Third	Kasia Niewiadoma (POL)	(Canyon//SRAM)

Youtube race summary

The fifth edition of the Strade Bianche Donne was held on 9 March 2019. Dutch rider Annemiek van Vleuten won the race after breaking clear on the final gravel sector. Denmark's Annika Langvad finished second, Poland's Kasia Niewiadoma third. Starting and finishing in Siena, Italy, it was the opening event of the 2019 UCI Women's World Tour.

The route was identical to that of the previous year, containing 30 km (19 mi) of gravel roads spread over eight sectors, for a total distance of 136 km (85 mi). The race was run in sunny weather and mild temperatures. Annemiek van Vleuten broke clear from the lead group on the final gravel sector of Le Tolfe, at 12 km (7.5 mi) from the finish, and held her lead on the steep final climb of Via Santa Caterina to finish solo on the Piazza del Campo in Siena.

== Teams ==
123 participants from 21 teams entered the race. Each team had a maximum of six riders:

Professional women's teams

- Alé–Cipollini
- Bigla Pro Cycling
- Boels–Dolmans
- Canyon//SRAM
- CCC - Liv
- FDJ Nouvelle-Aquitaine Futuroscope
- Mitchelton–Scott
- Movistar Team
- Team Sunweb
- Tibco–Silicon Valley Bank
- Trek–Segafredo
- Valcar–Cylance
- WNT–Rotor Pro Cycling
- Aromitalia–Basso Bikes–Vaiano
- Bepink
- BTC City Ljubljana
- Eurotarget–Bianchi–Vittoria
- Lotto–Soudal Ladies
- Servetto–Piumate–Beltrami TSA
- Top Girls Fassa Bortolo
- Team Virtu Cycling

== Results ==
Final general classification

Rank	Rider	Team	Time
1	Annemiek van Vleuten (NED)	Mitchelton–Scott	3h 48' 49"
2	Annika Langvad (DEN)	Boels–Dolmans	+ 37"
3	Katarzyna Niewiadoma (POL)	Canyon//SRAM	+ 40"
4	Marta Bastianelli (ITA)	Team Virtu Cycling	+ 44"
5	Cecilie Uttrup Ludwig (DEN)	Bigla Pro Cycling	s.t.
6	Ashleigh Moolman (RSA)	CCC - Liv	+ 51"
7	Marianne Vos (NED)	CCC - Liv	+ 52"
8	Janneke Ensing (NED)	Team Sunweb	+ 54"
9	Anna van der Breggen (NED)	Boels–Dolmans	+ 1' 28"
10	Chantal Blaak (NED)	Boels–Dolmans	+ 1' 50"
