= 2019 Liège–Bastogne–Liège Femmes =

2019 UCI Women's World Tour, race 9 of 23
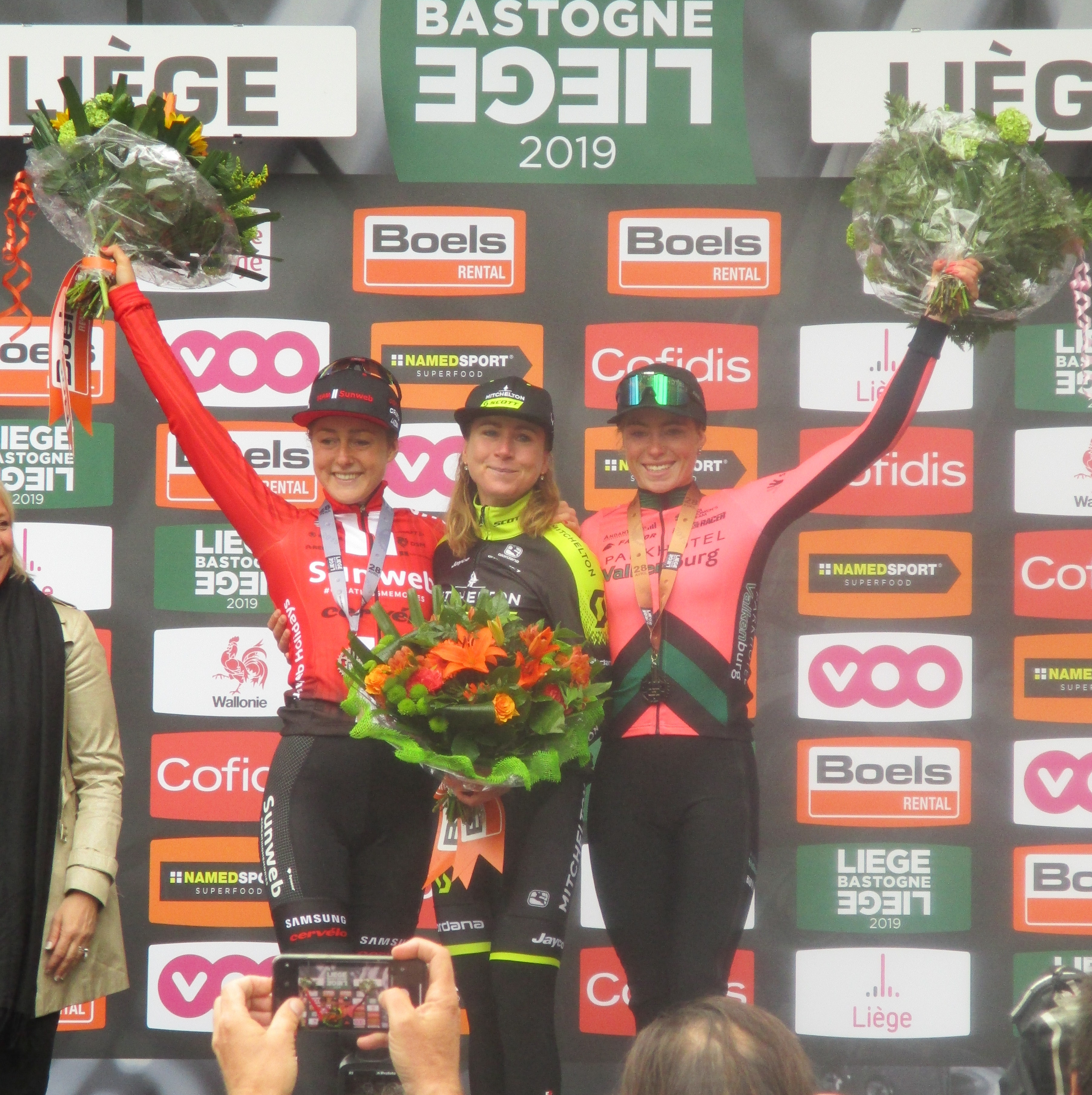
- Podium: 2. Mackaij, 1. Van Vleuten, 3. Vollering

Race details
- Dates: 28 April 2019
- Distance: 138.5 km (86.1 mi)
- Winning time: 3h 42' 10"

Results
	Winner	Annemiek van Vleuten (NED)	(Mitchelton–Scott)
	Second	Floortje Mackaij (NED)	(Team Sunweb)
	Third	Demi Vollering (NED)	(Parkhotel Valkenburg)

The third edition of Liège–Bastogne–Liège Femmes, a road cycling one-day race in Belgium, was held on 28 April 2019. It was the ninth event of the 2019 UCI Women's World Tour. The race started in Bastogne and finished in Liège, including five categorised climbs, covering a total distance of 138.5 km. It was won by Annemiek van Vleuten.

== Route ==
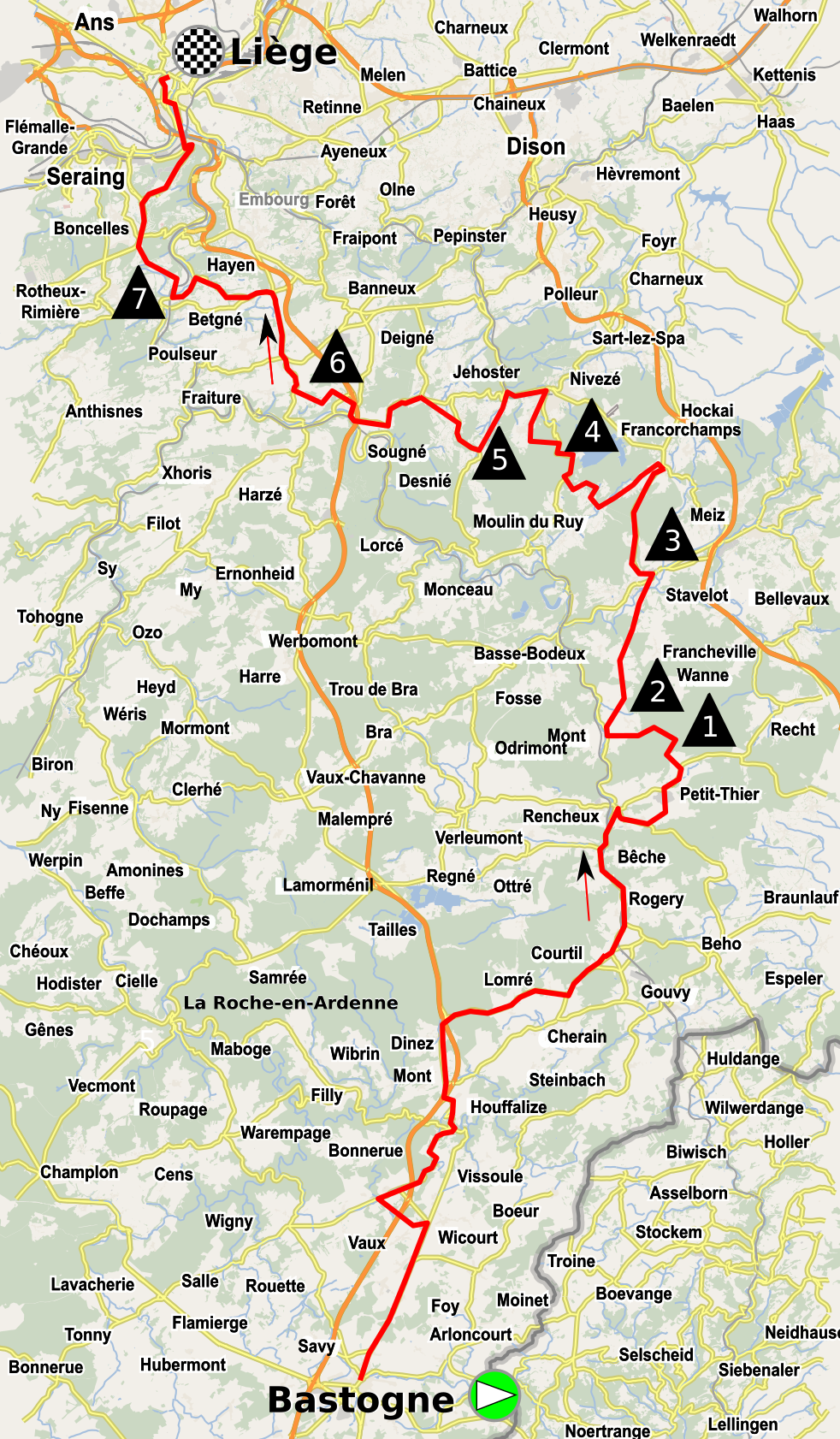
Route from Bastogne to Liège

Youtube race summary

The route is changed from previous editions with the finish now in Liège, rather than Ans. At 138.5 km, the race is approximately half the distance of the men's event. It starts in Bastogne, from where it heads north to finish in Liège on the same location as the men's race. The route features five categorised climbs: the Côte de Wanne, Côte de Brume, Côte de la Vecquée, Côte de La Redoute, and Côte de la Roche aux Faucons.

== Teams ==
Twenty four teams, each with a maximum of six riders, started the race:

Professional women's teams

- Boels–Dolmans
- Mitchelton–Scott
- CCC - Liv
- Trek–Segafredo
- Canyon//SRAM
- FDJ Nouvelle-Aquitaine Futuroscope
- Team Sunweb
- WNT–Rotor Pro Cycling
- Tibco–Silicon Valley Bank
- BTC City Ljubljana
- Team Virtu Cycling
- Alé–Cipollini
- Movistar Team
- Bigla Pro Cycling
- Astana
- Lotto–Soudal Ladies
- Aromitalia–Basso Bikes–Vaiano
- Parkhotel Valkenburg
- Bepink
- Valcar–Cylance
- Health Mate–Cyclelive Team
- Hagens Berman–Supermint
- Cogeas–Mettler–Look
- Doltcini–Van Eyck Sport

== Result ==
Final general classification

Rank	Rider	Team	Time
1	Annemiek van Vleuten (NED)	Mitchelton–Scott	3h 42' 10"
2	Floortje Mackaij (NED)	Team Sunweb	+ 1' 39"
3	Demi Vollering (NED)	Parkhotel Valkenburg	+ 1' 43"
4	Soraya Paladin (ITA)	Alé–Cipollini	s.t.
5	Lucinda Brand (NED)	Team Sunweb	s.t.
6	Katarzyna Niewiadoma (POL)	Canyon//SRAM	s.t.
7	Lizzie Deignan (UK)	Boels–Dolmans	s.t.
8	Alena Amialiusik (BLR)	Canyon//SRAM	s.t.
9	Elisa Longo Borghini (ITA)	Trek–Segafredo	s.t.
10	Cecilie Uttrup Ludwig (DEN)	Bigla Pro Cycling	s.t.
