= 2019 Amstel Gold Race (women's race) =

2019 UCI Women's World Tour, race 7 of 23

Race details
- Dates: 21 April 2018
- Stages: 1
- Distance: 127 km (79 mi)
- Winning time: 3h 25' 48"

Results
	Winner	Katarzyna Niewiadoma (POL)	(Canyon//SRAM)
	Second	Annemiek van Vleuten (NED)	(Mitchelton–Scott)
	Third	Marianne Vos (NED)	(CCC - Liv)

Youtube race summary

The sixth edition of the Amstel Gold Race for Women was a road cycling one-day race held on 21 April 2019 in the Netherlands. It was the seventh event of the 2019 UCI Women's World Tour. The race started in Maastricht and finished in Berg en Terblijt, containing 19 categorised climbs and covering a total distance of 127 km. It was won by Katarzyna Niewiadoma.

== Teams ==
Eighteen teams participated in the race. Each team has a maximum of six riders:

Professional women teams

- Alé–Cipollini
- Bigla Pro Cycling
- Boels–Dolmans
- Canyon//SRAM
- CCC - Liv
- Doltcini–Van Eyck Sport
- FDJ Nouvelle-Aquitaine Futuroscope
- Health Mate–Cyclelive Team
- Lotto–Soudal Ladies
- Mitchelton–Scott
- Movistar Team
- Parkhotel Valkenburg
- Team Sunweb
- Tibco–Silicon Valley Bank
- Trek–Segafredo
- Valcar–Cylance
- Team Virtu Cycling
- WNT–Rotor Pro Cycling

== Result ==
Final general classification

Rank	Rider	Team	Time
1	Katarzyna Niewiadoma (POL)	Canyon//SRAM	3h 25' 48"
2	Annemiek van Vleuten (NED)	Mitchelton–Scott	s.t.
3	Marianne Vos (NED)	CCC - Liv	+ 10"
4	Annika Langvad (DEN)	Boels–Dolmans	s.t.
5	Soraya Paladin (ITA)	Alé–Cipollini	s.t.
6	Cecilie Uttrup Ludwig (DEN)	Bigla Pro Cycling	s.t.
7	Demi Vollering (NED)	Parkhotel Valkenburg	s.t.
8	Marta Bastianelli (ITA)	Team Virtu Cycling	+ 30"
9	Alison Jackson (CAN)	Tibco–Silicon Valley Bank	s.t.
10	Elisa Balsamo (ITA)	Valcar–Cylance	s.t.
