= 2016 Acht van Westerveld =

Race details
- Dates: 13 March 2016
- Stages: 1
- Distance: 140.5 km (87.3 mi)
- Winning time: 3h 22' 45"

Results
	Winner	Leah Kirchmann (CAN)	(Team Liv–Plantur)
	Second	Christine Majerus (LUX)	(Boels–Dolmans)
	Third	Anouska Koster (NED)	(Rabobank-Liv Woman Cycling Team)

The 2016 Acht van Westerveld was the tenth running of the women's Drentse Acht van Westerveld, a women's bicycle race. It was held on 13 March 2016 over a distance of 140.5 kilometres (87.3 miles). It was rated by the UCI as a 1.2 category race.

== Result ==
Result
Rank	Rider	Team	Time
1	Leah Kirchmann (CAN)	Team Liv–Plantur	3:32:45
2	Christine Majerus (LUX)	Boels–Dolmans	s.t.
3	Anouska Koster (NED)	Rabobank-Liv Woman Cycling Team	s.t.
4	Tiffany Cromwell (AUS)	Canyon//SRAM	s.t.
5	Emilia Fahlin (SWE)	Alé–Cipollini	s.t.
6	Chloe Hosking (AUS)	Wiggle High5	s.t.
7	Gracie Elvin (AUS)	Orica–AIS	s.t.
8	Emma Johansson (SWE)	Wiggle High5	+ 2"
9	Coryn Rivera (USA)	UnitedHealthcare	+ 2"
10	Marianne Vos (NED)	Rabobank-Liv Woman Cycling Team	+ 2"
