= Maëlle Grossetête =

French cyclist

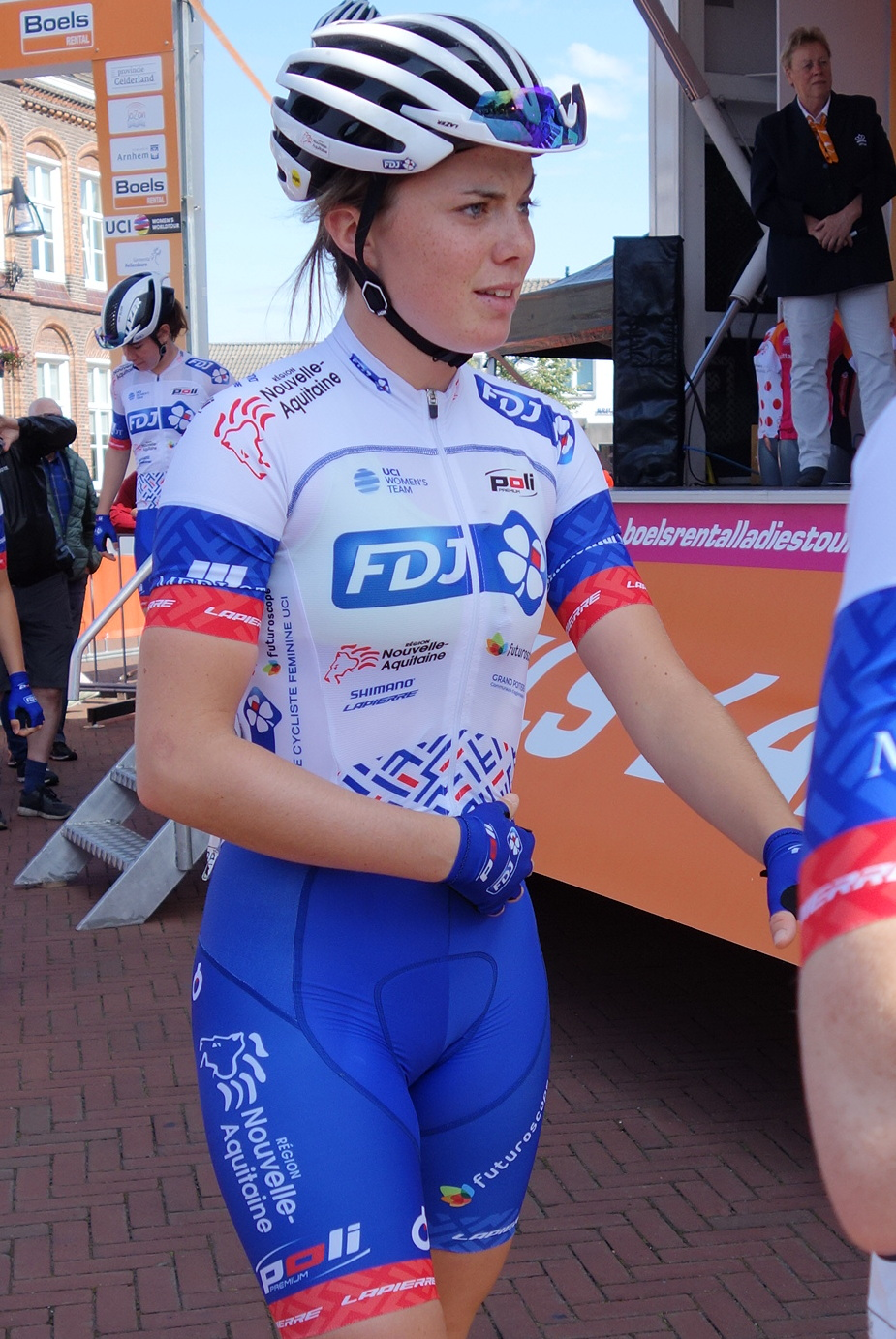
- Grossetête in 2019

Personal information
- Full name: Maëlle Grossetête
- Born: 10 April 1998 (age 28) Sallanches, France
- Height: 1.72 m (5 ft 7 1/2 in)
- Weight: 60 kg (132 lb; 9 st 6 lb)

Cycling career
- Sport: Cycling
- Current team: Human Powered Health
- Discipline: Road
- Role: Rider

Professional teams
- 2018–2023: FDJ Nouvelle-Aquitaine Futuroscope
- 2024–: Human Powered Health

Maëlle Grossetête (born 10 April 1998) is a French professional racing cyclist, who currently rides for UCI Women's WorldTeam Human Powered Health.

== Major results ==
2015
National Junior Road Championships

2nd Time trial
6th Road race

4th Trofeo Da Moreno - Piccolo Trofeo Alfredo Binda
2016
3rd Time trial, National Junior Road Championships
6th Overall Albstadt-Frauen-Etappenrennen
2017
10th Time trial, National Road Championships
2018
2nd Kreiz Breizh Elites Dames
6th Time trial, UEC European Under–23 Road Championships
7th Time trial, National Road Championships
2019
1st Time trial, National Under–23 Road Championships
5th Grand Prix International d'Isbergues
2021
7th Ronde de Mouscron
2022
6th A Travers les Hauts de France
2023
4th Grand Prix International d'Isbergues
10th La Périgord Ladies
