= Giro delle Marche in Rosa =

Race details
- Date: September
- Region: Italy
- Discipline: Road
- Competition: National (2018); UCI 2.2 (2019–)
- Type: Stage race

History
- First edition: 2018
- Editions: 2 (as of 2019)
- First winner: Sofia Bertizzolo (ITA)
- Most recent: Soraya Paladin (ITA)

Giro delle Marche in Rosa is a multi-day women's road cycling race held in Italy. The first edition was held in 2019 as a 2.2 category race on the UCI women's road cycling calendar.

== Past winners ==
| Year | Country | Rider | Team |
|---|---|---|---|
| 2018 | Italy | Sofia Bertizzolo | Team Virtu Cycling |
| 2019 | Italy | Soraya Paladin | Alé–Cipollini |
