= Leah Kirchmann =

Canadian cyclist (born 1990)

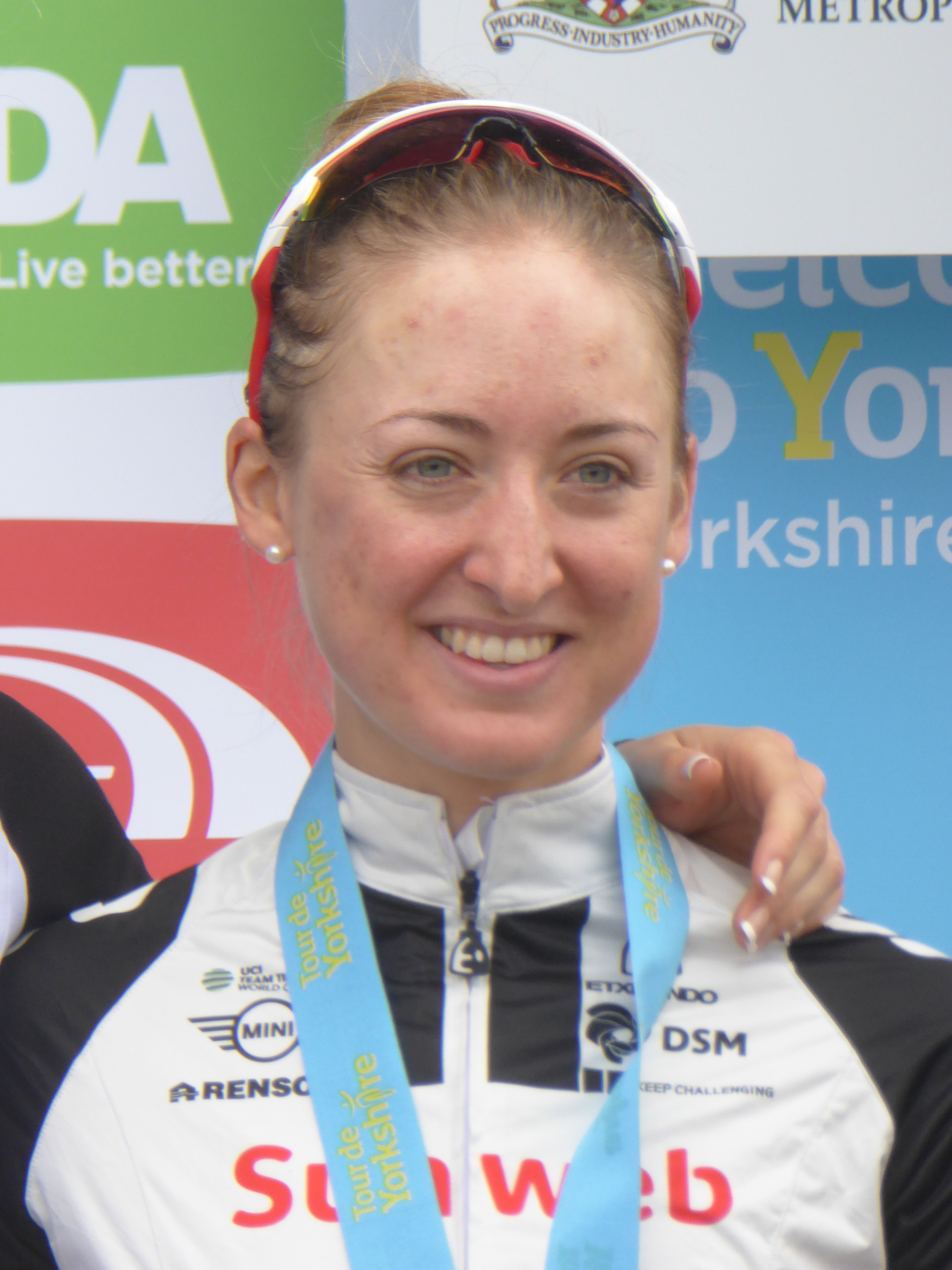
- Kirchmann at the 2018 Women's Tour de Yorkshire

Personal information
- Born: 30 June 1990 (age 36) Winnipeg, Manitoba, Canada
- Height: 166 cm (5 ft 5 in)
- Weight: 59 kg (130 lb)

Cycling career
- Sport: Cycling
- Discipline: Road
- Role: Rider
- Rider type: All-rounder

Professional teams
- 2011: Colavita–Forno d'Asolo
- 2012–2015: Optum Pro Cycling
- 2016–2022: Team Liv–Plantur

Major wins
- 2016 Giro d'Italia prologue victory 2017 TTT World Champion 10x Canadian National Champion
Medal record
Women's road bicycle racing
Representing Canada
Pan American Championships
Silver medal – second place	2012 Mar del Plata	Road race

Leah Kirchmann (born 30 June 1990) is a Canadian racing cyclist. She competed for Team Canada at the Rio 2016, and Tokyo 2021 Olympic Games in the sport of road cycling. In 2017, she won the Team-Time-Trial World Championships with Team Sunweb in Bergen, Norway. At the 2014 Global Relay Canadian Road Championships, held in Lac-Mégantic, Quebec, she won the road race, time trial and the criterium, becoming the first woman to win all three titles in the same year.

== Career ==
Kirchmann's first sport was cross-country skiing. She continued to compete as a skier until about the age of 18. Kirchmann originally started mountain biking as summer training for ski racing. She turned professional in 2011 with the Colavita–Forno d'Asolo team. When the team dissolved at the end of 2011, Kirchmann followed director Rachel Heal to the new Optum Pro Cycling team in 2012. Kirchmann signed for Team Liv–Plantur on 8 October 2015 for the 2016 season, and remained with the team (Team Sunweb / Team DSM) until 2022.

In June 2016, she was officially named in Canada's 2016 Olympic team. She also qualified to represent Canada at the 2020 Summer Olympics.

In August 2022, Kirchmann announced that she would retire from professional cycling at the end of the 2022 season. However, in December 2022, it was announced that Kirchmann would form part of the roster for the Denver Disruptors, for the inaugural season of the National Cycling League in 2023.

== Major results ==
2006
1st Cross-country, National Junior Mountain Bike Championships
2009
1st Criterium, Canada Summer Games
2010
National Road Championships

1st Criterium
1st Under-23 road race

6th Grand Prix Cycliste de Gatineau
2011
1st Criterium, National Road Championships
1st Overall Tour of Elk Grove
Nature Valley Grand Prix

1st Mountains classification
1st Sprints classification
1st Stage 5

4th Grand Prix Cycliste de Gatineau
10th Road race, Pan American Road Championships
2012
1st Sprints classification, Energiewacht Tour
2nd Road race, Pan American Road Championships
4th Liberty Classic
9th Overall Tour Cycliste Féminin International de l'Ardèche

1st Young rider classification

2013
National Road Championships

1st Criterium
2nd Road race

1st White Spot / Delta Road Race
2014
National Road Championships

1st Time trial
1st Road race
1st Criterium

1st White Spot / Delta Road Race
San Dimas Stage Race

1st Sprints classification
1st Young rider classification
1st Stage 3

2nd Chrono Gatineau
3rd Overall Redlands Bicycle Classic

1st Points classification
1st Stages 3 & 4

3rd La Course by Le Tour de France
4th EPZ Omloop van Borsele
6th Overall BeNe Ladies Tour
7th Grand Prix cycliste de Gatineau
8th Road race, Commonwealth Games
2015
National Road Championships

2nd Road race
3rd Time trial
3rd Criterium

2nd Overall Tour of California

1st Points classification
1st Stages 2 & 3

2nd White Spot / Delta Road Race
4th Overall Joe Martin Stage Race

1st Stage 2

6th Grand Prix cycliste de Gatineau
7th Overall San Dimas Stage Race
7th Overall The Women's Tour
7th Philadelphia Cycling Classic
8th Overall Tour of the Gila
2016
1st Drentse Acht van Westerveld
2nd Omloop van het Hageland
3rd Road race, National Road Championships
3rd Overall Tour of Chongming Island
3rd Grand Prix Cycliste de Gatineau
3rd RideLondon Grand Prix
4th Omloop Het Nieuwsblad
6th Overall The Women's Tour
6th Chrono Gatineau
6th GP de Plouay
7th Gent–Wevelgem
8th Overall Giro d'Italia Femminile

1st Prologue

10th Overall Holland Ladies Tour
10th Strade Bianche
10th Ronde van Drenthe
2017
1st Team time trial, UCI Road World Championships
1st Grand Prix Cycliste de Gatineau
2nd Time trial, National Road Championships
3rd Crescent Vårgårda Road Race
4th Overall The Women's Tour
4th White Spot / Delta Road Race
9th Chrono Gatineau
9th Madrid Challenge by La Vuelta
2018
National Road Championships

1st Time trial
5th Road race

1st Team time trial, Ladies Tour of Norway
1st Stage 1 (TTT) Giro Rosa
2nd Brabantse Pijl
2nd Crescent Vårgårda TTT
3rd UCI Road World Championships – Women's team time trial
4th UCI Road World Championships – Women's time trial
4th Overall Madrid Challenge by La Vuelta

1st Stage 1 (TTT)

5th Overall Holland Ladies Tour
2019
National Road Championships

1st Time trial
2nd Road race

1st Grand Prix Cycliste de Gatineau
2nd Chrono Gatineau
2nd La Course by Le Tour de France
3rd Overall Ladies Tour of Norway
3rd Omloop van het Hageland
3rd Postnord UCI WWT Vårgårda West Sweden TTT
6th Overall The Women's Tour
8th Brabantse Pijl
10th Postnord UCI WWT Vårgårda West Sweden
2020
5th Overall Challenge by La Vuelta
5th Cadel Evans Great Ocean Road Race
6th Overall Women's Tour Down Under

1st Sprints classification

9th Race Torquay
2021
2nd Overall Festival Elsy Jacobs
6th Overall The Women's Tour
2022
3rd Time trial, National Road Championships
