= 2019 La Course by Le Tour de France =

2019 UCI Women's World Tour, race 15 of 23
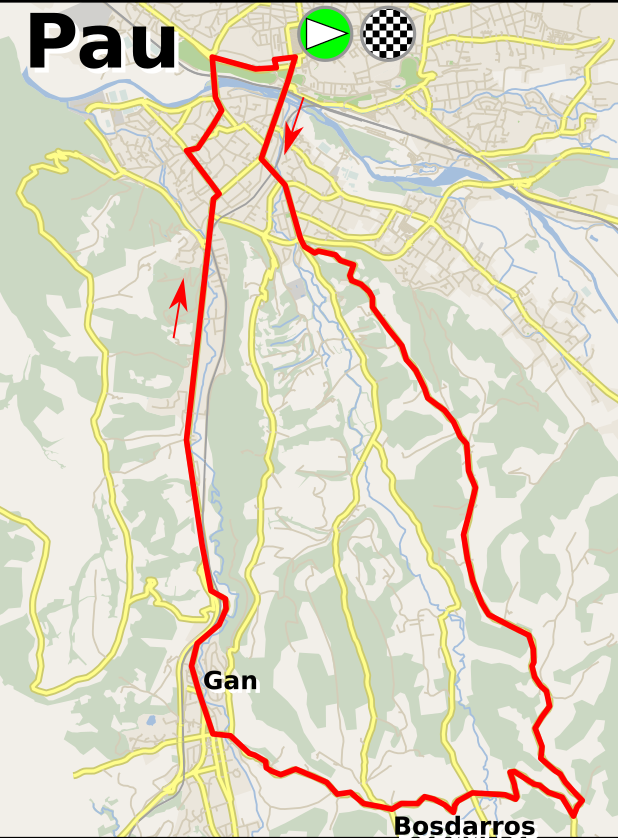

Race details
- Dates: 19 July 2019
- Stages: 1
- Distance: 121 km (75 mi)
- Winning time: 3h 15' 20"

Results
	Winner	Marianne Vos (NED)	(CCC - Liv)
	Second	Leah Kirchmann (CAN)	(Team Sunweb)
	Third	Cecilie Uttrup Ludwig (DEN)	(Bigla Pro Cycling)

The 2019 La Course by Le Tour de France was the sixth edition of La Course by Le Tour de France, a women's cycling race held in France. It took place on 19 July 2019 and was the fifteenth event on the 2019 UCI Women's World Tour. The event was organised by ASO, which also organises the Tour de France. The race was won by Dutch rider Marianne Vos of CCC Liv.

== Route ==
The race started and finished in Pau, taking in five laps of a hilly circuit covering 121 km. It was held before stage 13 of the men's 2019 Tour de France, which used one lap of the circuit as an individual time trial. A similar course was subsequently used as the eighth stage of the 2023 Tour de France Femmes as an individual time trial.

== Results ==
The race was won by Dutch rider Marianne Vos of CCC Liv, who caught the solo breakaway rider Amanda Spratt of Mitchelton-Scott on the final slopes in Pau.

Result
Rank	Rider	Team	Time
1	Marianne Vos (NED)	CCC - Liv	3h 15' 20"
2	Leah Kirchmann (CAN)	Team Sunweb	+ 3"
3	Cecilie Uttrup Ludwig (DEN)	Bigla Pro Cycling	+ 3"
4	Lucinda Brand (NED)	Team Sunweb	+ 4"
5	Ashleigh Moolman-Pasio (RSA)	CCC - Liv	+ 6"
6	Elisa Longo Borghini (ITA)	Trek–Segafredo	+ 6"
7	Annemiek van Vleuten (NED)	Mitchelton–Scott	+ 7"
8	Soraya Paladin (ITA)	Alé–Cipollini	+ 7"
9	Ane Santesteban (ESP)	WNT–Rotor Pro Cycling	+ 7"
10	Anna van der Breggen (NED)	Boels–Dolmans	+ 7"

== See also ==
- 2019 in women's road cycling
