= Soraya Paladin =

Italian cyclist (born 1993)

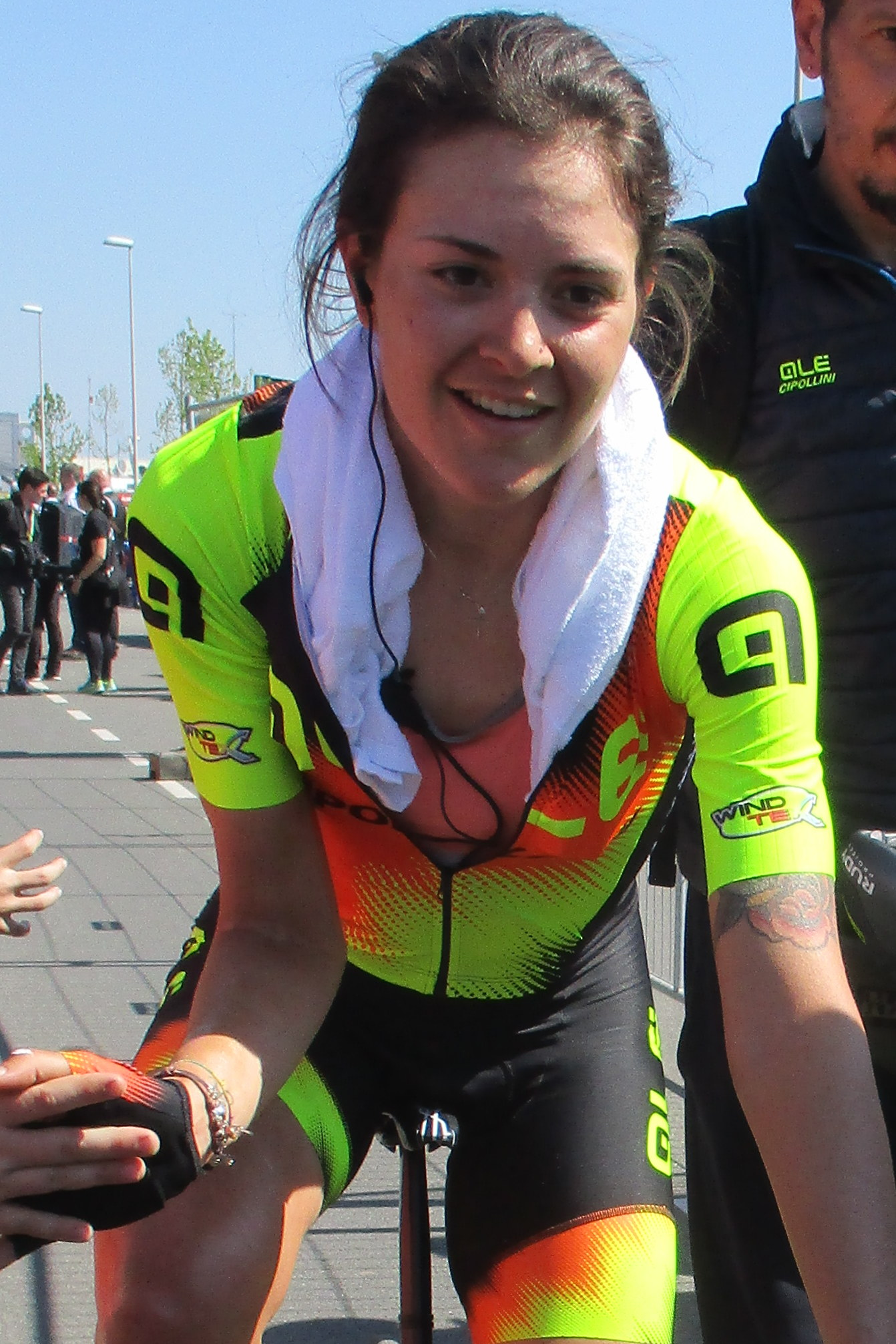
- Paladin at the 2019 Amstel Gold Race

Personal information
- Full name: Soraya Paladin
- Born: 4 May 1993 (age 33) Treviso, Italy
- Height: 1.66 m (5 ft 5 in)
- Weight: 59 kg (130 lb)

Cycling career
- Sport: Cycling
- Current team: Canyon//SRAM
- Discipline: Road
- Role: Rider

Professional teams
- 2012–2016: Fassa Bortolo–Servetto
- 2017–2019: Alé–Cipollini
- 2020–2021: Liv Racing
- 2022–: Canyon//SRAM
Medal record
Women's road bicycle racing
Representing Italy
World Championships
Bronze medal – third place	2024 Zurich	Mixed team relay
European Championships
Silver medal – second place	2023 Drenthe	Mixed team relay

Soraya Paladin (born 4 May 1993) is an Italian professional racing cyclist, who currently rides for UCI Women's WorldTeam Canyon//SRAM. She rode in the 2014 Tour de Bretagne Féminin. Her sister Asja Paladin also competed professionally as a cyclist. She competed at the 2020 Summer Olympics, in Road race.

== Major results ==
2016
3rd Overall Giro del Trentino Alto Adige - Südtirol
National Road Championships

5th Road race
8th Time trial

6th Overall Giro della Toscana
7th Overall Tour de Pologne
9th Gran Premio della Liberazione
9th Overall Trophée d'Or Féminin
2017
3rd Road race, National Road Championships
3rd Gran Premio della Liberazione
5th Giro del Trentino Alto Adige-Südtirol
2018
1st Overall Giro della Toscana

1st Stage 2

4th Le Samyn
6th Grand Prix de Dottignies
2019
1st Overall Giro delle Marche in Rosa

1st Mountains classification
1st Sprints classification
1st Stage 3

1st Mountains classification, Tour of Norway
2nd Overall Vuelta a Burgos

1st Points classification
1st Stages 2 & 3

2nd Overall Setmana Ciclista Valenciana

1st Mountains classification

2nd Overall Giro della Toscana

1st Mountains classification
1st Stages 2

3rd Overall Emakumeen Euskal Bira
3rd Overall Tour de Yorkshire
3rd Emakumeen Saria
4th Liège–Bastogne–Liège
5th Amstel Gold Race
6th Giro dell'Emilia
8th La Course by Le Tour de France
9th Trofeo Alfredo Binda
9th Overall Giro Rosa
9th Crescent Vårgårda TTT
10th Emakumeen Nafarroako Klasikoa
2020
6th Giro dell'Emilia
9th La Course by Le Tour de France
2021
2nd Time trial, National Road Championships
5th Trofeo Alfredo Binda
5th Amstel Gold Race
7th La Course by Le Tour de France
2022
1st Points classification, Tour de Romandie
3rd Trofeo Alfredo Binda
6th Emakumeen Saria
2023
2nd Team relay, UEC European Road Championships
5th Trofeo Alfredo Binda
5th Amstel Gold Race
7th Overall UAE Tour
8th Overall Vuelta a Burgos
9th Omloop Het Nieuwsblad
9th Liège–Bastogne–Liège
9th De Brabantse Pijl
9th Overall RideLondon Classique
2024
4th Trofeo Alfredo Binda-Comune di Cittiglio
6th Overall RideLondon Classique
7th Overall Vuelta a Burgos
10th Amstel Gold Race
2025
5th Trofeo Palma Femina
