= Grand Prix International d'Isbergues =

Race details
- Date: September
- Region: France
- Discipline: Road

History
- First edition: 2019
- Editions: 5 (as of 2023)
- First winner: Christine Majerus (LUX)
- Most wins: No repeat winners
- Most recent: Valentine Fortin (FRA)

Grand Prix International d'Isbergues (also known as Grand Prix International d'Isbergues - Pas de Calais Féminin) is an elite women's professional one-day road bicycle race held in France and is currently rated by the UCI as a 1.2 race.

== Past winners ==
Year	Country	Rider	Team
2019	Luxembourg	Christine Majerus	Boels–Dolmans
2020	Australia	Chloe Hosking	Rally Cycling
2021	Netherlands	Charlotte Kool	NXTG Racing
2022	Italy	Chiara Consonni	Valcar–Travel & Service
2023	France	Valentine Fortin	Cofidis
