= Ladies Tour of Norway =

Bicycle race in Østfold, Norway

Race details
- Date: August
- Region: Norway
- Discipline: Road
- Type: Stage race
- Organiser: Ladies Tour of Norway AS
- Web site: www.ladiestour.no

History
- First edition: 2014
- Editions: 7 (as of 2021)
- Final edition: 2021
- First winner: Anna van der Breggen (NED)
- Most wins: Marianne Vos (NED) (3 wins)
- Final winner: Annemiek van Vleuten (NED)

The Ladies Tour of Norway was a women's cycle stage race. The first edition of the race was held from 15 to 17 August 2014 based in the town of Halden in south east Norway. It consisted of an individual time trial prologue and two road race stages. Since 2017 the race is part of the UCI Women's World Tour, cycling's season-long competition of top-tier events.

From 2022, the event was replaced by the Tour of Scandinavia – a multi-day stage race held across Norway, Sweden and Denmark. However the Tour of Scandinavia only lasted two editions before being cancelled, due to lack of interest from sponsors and host broadcasters.

In 2025, Tour of Norway organisers introduced Tour of Norway Women; however this race was not a continuation of Ladies Tour of Norway.

== Overall winners ==
| Year | Winner | Second | Third |
|---|---|---|---|
| 2014 | Anna van der Breggen (NED) | Marianne Vos (NED) | Katarzyna Niewiadoma (POL) |
| 2015 | Megan Guarnier (USA) | Shelley Olds (USA) | Amanda Spratt (AUS) |
| 2016 | Lucinda Brand (NED) | Thalita de Jong (NED) | Anouska Koster (NED) |
| 2017 | Marianne Vos (NED) | Megan Guarnier (USA) | Ellen van Dijk (NED) |
| 2018 | Marianne Vos (NED) | Emilia Fahlin (SWE) | Coryn Rivera (USA) |
| 2019 | Marianne Vos (NED) | Coryn Rivera (USA) | Leah Kirchmann (CAN) |
| 2020 | Race cancelled due to COVID-19 pandemic | | |
| 2021 | Annemiek van Vleuten (NED) | Ashleigh Moolman (RSA) | Kristen Faulkner (USA) |
