= Silvia Pollicini =

Italian cyclist

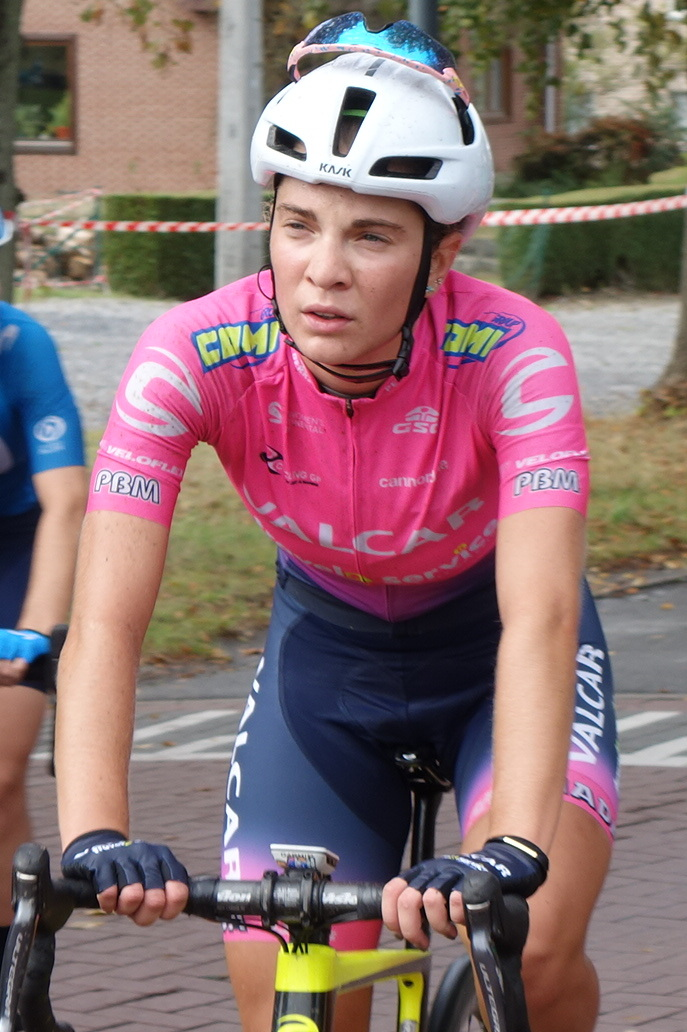
- Pollicini at the 2020 La Flèche Wallonne Femmes

Personal information
- Full name: Silvia Pollicini
- Born: 31 December 1998 (age 27)

Cycling career
- Sport: Cycling
- Current team: Retired
- Discipline: Road
- Role: Rider

Professional team
- 2017–2021: Valcar–PBM

Silvia Pollicini (born 31 December 1998) is an Italian former professional racing cyclist, who rode professionally between 2017 and 2021 for UCI Women's Continental Team Valcar–Travel & Service.
