= Ronde de Mouscron =

Belgian one-day road cycling race

Race details
- Date: April
- Region: Mouscron, Belgium
- Discipline: Road

History
- First edition: 2021
- Editions: 6 (as of 2026)
- First winner: Chiara Consonni (ITA)
- Most wins: No repeat winners
- Most recent: Clara Copponi (FRA)

The Ronde de Mouscron is an elite women's professional one-day road bicycle race held annually in Mouscron, Belgium. The event was initially planned to take place in 2020, but was cancelled due to the COVID-19 pandemic. Therefore, it first held in 2021 as the successor to the Grand Prix de Dottignies and is currently rated by the UCI as a 1.1 category race.

== Past winners ==
Year	Country	Rider	Team
2021	Italy	Chiara Consonni	Valcar–Travel & Service
2022	Netherlands	Thalita de Jong	JEGG-DJR Academy
2023	Italy	Martina Fidanza	Ceratizit–WNT Pro Cycling
2024	Poland	Daria Pikulik	Human Powered Health
2025	Norway	Susanne Andersen	Uno-X Mobility
2026	France	Clara Copponi	Lidl–Trek
