= Birgitte Krogsgaard =

Danish cyclist

Personal information
- Full name: Birgitte Krogsgaard Andersen
- Born: 27 October 1991 (age 34)

Cycling career
- Sport: Cycling
- Discipline: Road
- Role: Rider

Amateur teams
- 2018: Marselisborg CC
- 2020: Aura Energi–CK Aarhus

Professional team
- 2019: Team Virtu Cycling

Birgitte Krogsgaard Andersen (born 27 October 1991) is a Danish racing cyclist, who competed for the UCI Women's Team Team Virtu Cycling during the 2019 women's road cycling season.
