= 2019 Postnord UCI WWT Vårgårda West Sweden TTT =

2019 Postnord UCI WWT Vårgårda West Sweden Team time trial
2019 UCI Women's World Tour, race 17 of 23

Race details
- Dates: 17 August 2019
- Stages: 1
- Distance: 36 km (22 mi)
- Winning time: 43' 53"

Results
| | Winner | Trek–Segafredo |
| | Second | Canyon//SRAM |
| | Third | Team Sunweb |

The 2019 Postnord UCI WWT Vårgårda West Sweden Team time trial features as the 17th round of the 2019 UCI Women's World Tour. It was held on 17 August 2019, in Vårgårda, Sweden. The team time trial was ridden on a 36 kilometres (22 mi) long course, starting in Vårgårda and going out and back to Herrljunga.

The race was won by the Trek–Segafredo team.

== Teams ==
Fourteen professional teams each with a maximum of six riders took part in the race:

UCI Women's WorldTeams

- Alé–Cipollini
- Boels–Dolmans
- BTC City Ljubljana
- Canyon//SRAM
- CCC - Liv
- FDJ Nouvelle-Aquitaine Futuroscope
- Mitchelton–Scott
- Movistar Team
- Parkhotel Valkenburg
- Team Sunweb
- Team Virtu Cycling
- Tibco–Silicon Valley Bank
- Trek–Segafredo
- Valcar–Cylance

== Results ==
Result
| Rank | Team | Time |
|---|---|---|
| 1 | Trek–Segafredo | 43' 53" |
| 2 | Canyon//SRAM | + 25" |
| 3 | Team Sunweb | + 46" |
| 4 | Boels–Dolmans | + 1' 17" |
| 5 | Team Virtu Cycling | + 1' 48" |
| 6 | Mitchelton–Scott | + 1' 50" |
| 7 | Valcar–Cylance | + 2' 35" |
| 8 | CCC - Liv | + 3' 04" |
| 9 | Alé–Cipollini | + 3' 04" |
| 10 | Movistar Team | + 3' 19" |
| 11 | FDJ Nouvelle-Aquitaine Futuroscope | + 3' 20" |
| 12 | BTC City Ljubljana | + 3' 24" |
| 13 | Parkhotel Valkenburg | + 3' 31" |
| 14 | Tibco–Silicon Valley Bank | + 7' 27" |
