= Susanne Andersen =

Norwegian cyclist (born 1998)

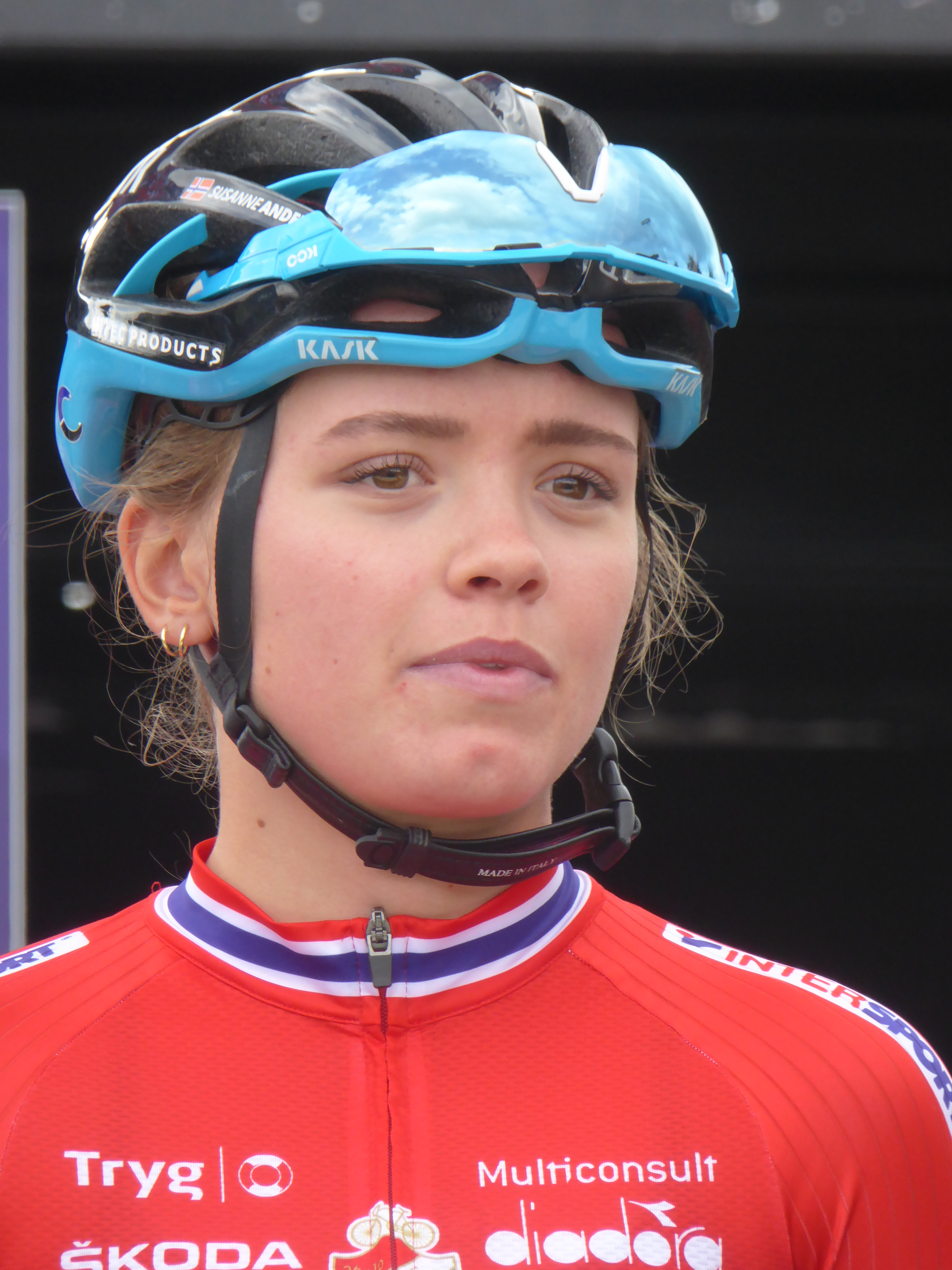
- Andersen at the 2018 European Road Cycling Championships.

Personal information
- Full name: Susanne Andersen
- Born: 23 July 1998 (age 28) Stavanger, Norway

Cycling career
- Sport: Cycling
- Current team: Uno-X Mobility
- Discipline: Road
- Role: Rider

Amateur team
- 2012–2016: Stavanger SK

Professional teams
- 2016–2018: Team Hitec Products
- 2019–2021: Team Sunweb
- 2022–: Uno-X Pro Cycling Team
Medal record
Women's road cycling
Representing Norway
World Championships
Bronze medal – third place	2016 Doha	Junior road race

Susanne Andersen (born 23 July 1998) is a Norwegian professional racing cyclist, who currently rides for UCI Women's WorldTeam Uno-X Mobility. At the 2016 UCI Road World Championships in Qatar, Andersen finished 13th in the junior individual time trial. On her way back to the hotel she was hit by a motorist; despite her injuries she won the bronze medal in the junior road race four days later.

== Major results ==
2015
National Junior Road Championships

1st Time trial
2nd Road race

1st National Junior Cyclo-cross Championships
5th UCI Junior Road Race World Championships
2016
National Junior Road Championships

1st Road race
1st Time trial

3rd UCI Junior Road Race World Championships
2017
1st Criterium, National Road Championships
1st Norwegian rider classification Ladies Tour of Norway
2nd Road race, UEC European Under-23 Road Championships
7th Road race, UCI Road World Championships
2018
Combativity award Stage 1 The Women's Tour
2nd Road race, National Road Championships
2021
2nd GP Eco-Struct
2022
4th Vuelta a la Comunitat Valenciana Feminas
4th Le Samyn
6th GP Oetingen
7th Gent–Wevelgem
2023
1st Road race, National Road Championships
2nd Ronde van Drenthe
2025
1st Ronde de Mouscron
1st Antwerp Port Epic
3rd Omloop van het Hageland
7th Copenhagen Sprint
