= Valcar–Travel & Service =

Italian cycling team

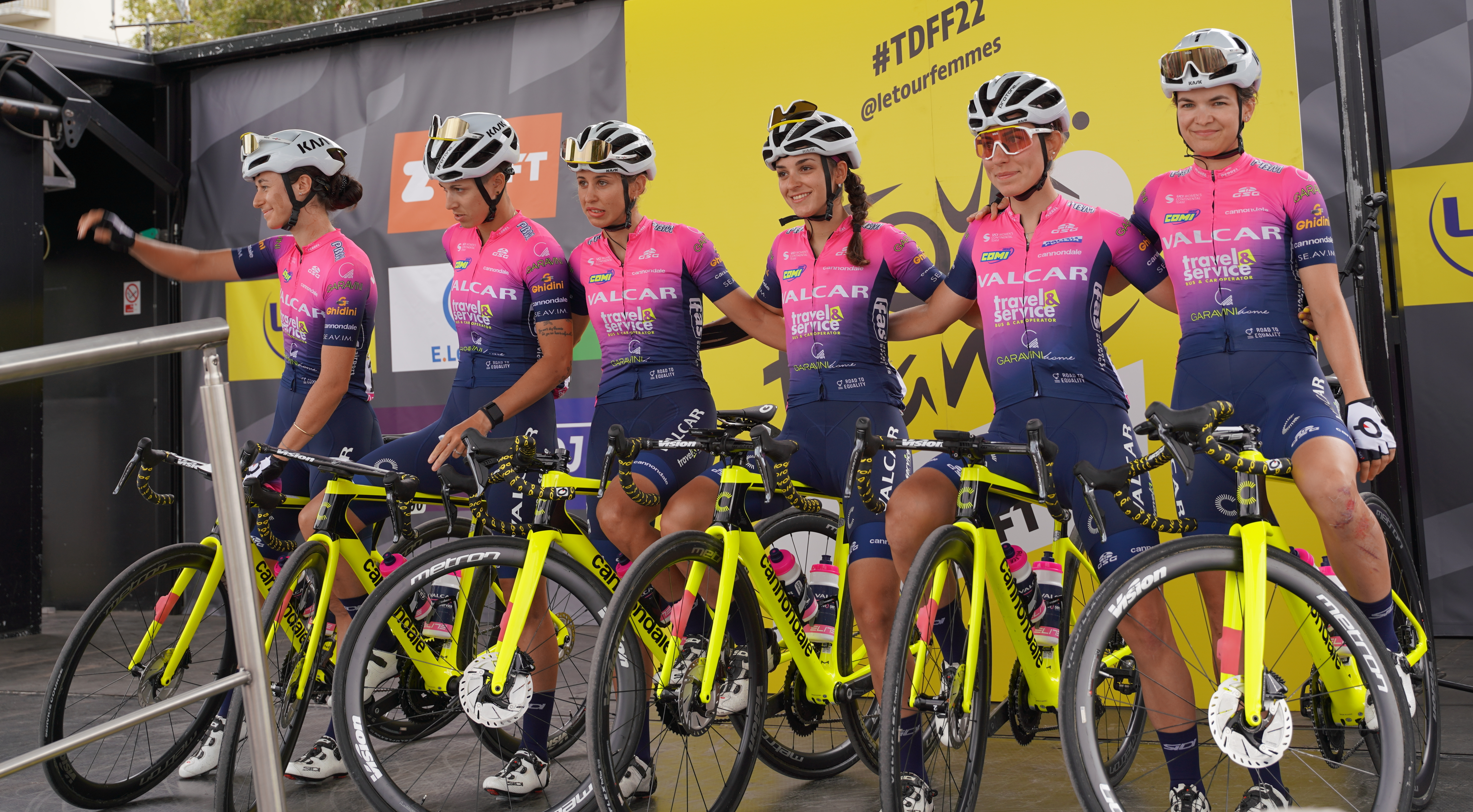
- Riders at the 2022 Tour de France Femmes

Team information
- UCI code: VAL
- Registered: Italy
- Founded: 2017
- Status: UCI Women's Team (2017–2019); UCI Women's Continental Team (2020–present)
- Bicycles: Cannondale

Team name history
- 2017–2018 2019 2020–: Valcar–PBM; Valcar–Cylance; Valcar–Travel & Service

Valcar–Travel & Service is a professional road bicycle racing women's team which participates in elite women's races.

== Team roster ==
As of 28 January 2021.

Rider	Date of birth
Martina Alzini (ITA)	10 February 1997 (age 29)
Alice Maria Arzuffi (ITA)	19 November 1994 (age 31)
Matilde Bertolini (ITA)	24 September 2002 (age 23)
Chiara Consonni (ITA)	24 June 1999 (age 27)
Eleonora Gasparrini (ITA)	25 March 2002 (age 24)
Vittoria Guazzini (ITA)	26 December 2000 (age 25)
Silvia Magri (ITA)	17 October 2000 (age 25)

Rider	Date of birth
Barbara Malcotti (ITA)	19 February 2000 (age 26)
Silvia Persico (ITA)	25 July 1997 (age 29)
Federica Piergiovanni (ITA)	30 July 2001 (age 25)
Elena Pirrone (ITA)	21 February 1999 (age 27)
Silvia Pollicini (ITA)	31 December 1998 (age 27)
Ilaria Sanguineti (ITA)	15 April 1994 (age 32)
Miriam Vece (ITA)	16 March 1997 (age 29)
Margaux Vigie (FRA)	21 July 1995 (age 31)

== Major results ==
2017
Sprints classification Giro della Toscana Int. Femminile – Memorial Michela Fanini, Elisa Balsamo

2018
Omloop van Borsele, Elisa Balsamo
Points classification Giro Toscana Int. Femminile - Memorial Michela Fanini, Maria Giulia Confalonieri
Young rider classification Giro delle Marche, Dalia Muccioli

Stage 1, Dalia Muccioli

Points classification Madrid Challenge by la Vuelta, Ilaria Sanguineti
Gran Premio Bruno Beghelli Internazionale Donne Elite, Elisa Balsamo

2019
Trofee Maarten Wynants, Elisa Balsamo
Stage 3 Tour of California, Elisa Balsamo
Dwars door de Westhoek, Elisa Balsamo
Stage 5 Boels Ladies Tour, Chiara Consonni
Stage 1 Giro delle Marche in Rosa, Marta Cavalli
Stage 2 Giro delle Marche in Rosa, Elisa Balsamo

2021
Ronde de Mouscron, Chiara Consonni

2022
Dwars door Vlaanderen, Chiara Consonni
Gran Premio della Liberazione, Silvia Persico
Gran Premio Ciudad de Eibar, Olivia Baril
Memorial Monica Bandini, Silvia Persico
Team classification RideLondon Classique
Dwars door de Westhoek, Chiara Consonni
Dwars door het Hageland, Ilaria Sanguinetti
SPAR Flanders Diamond Tour, Chiara Consonni
Stage 10 Giro Donne, Chiara Consonni
MerXem Classic, Eleonora Gasparini
Stage 3 Giro Toscana Int. Femminile - Memorial Michela Fanini, Karolina Kumiega
Stage 4 Ceratizit Challenge by La Vuelta, Silvia Persico
Grand Prix International d'Isbergues, Chiara Consonni

== National & continental champions ==
2017
European U23 Track (Team pursuit), Marta Cavalli
European U23 Track (Team pursuit), Elisa Balsamo
European U23 Track (Omnium), Elisa Balsamo
European Track (Team pursuit), Elisa Balsamo
2018
Italian Road Race, Marta Cavalli
European Track (Points race), Maria Giulia Confalonieri
Italian Track (Madison), Elisa Balsamo
Italian Track (Madison), Maria Giulia Confalonieri
2019
European Track (Points race), Maria Giulia Confalonieri
2020
European U23 Track (Team pursuit), Vittoria Guazzini
European U23 Track (Team pursuit), Marta Cavalli
European U23 Track (Team pursuit), Chiara Consonni
Italian Track (500m Time Trial), Miriam Vece
Italian Track (Individual Sprint), Miriam Vece
2022
Latvia Road Race, Anastasia Carbonari
Afghanistan Time Trial, Fariba Hashimi
Afghanistan Road Race, Fariba Hashimi
