= Team Virtu Cycling Women =

Danish women's cycling team

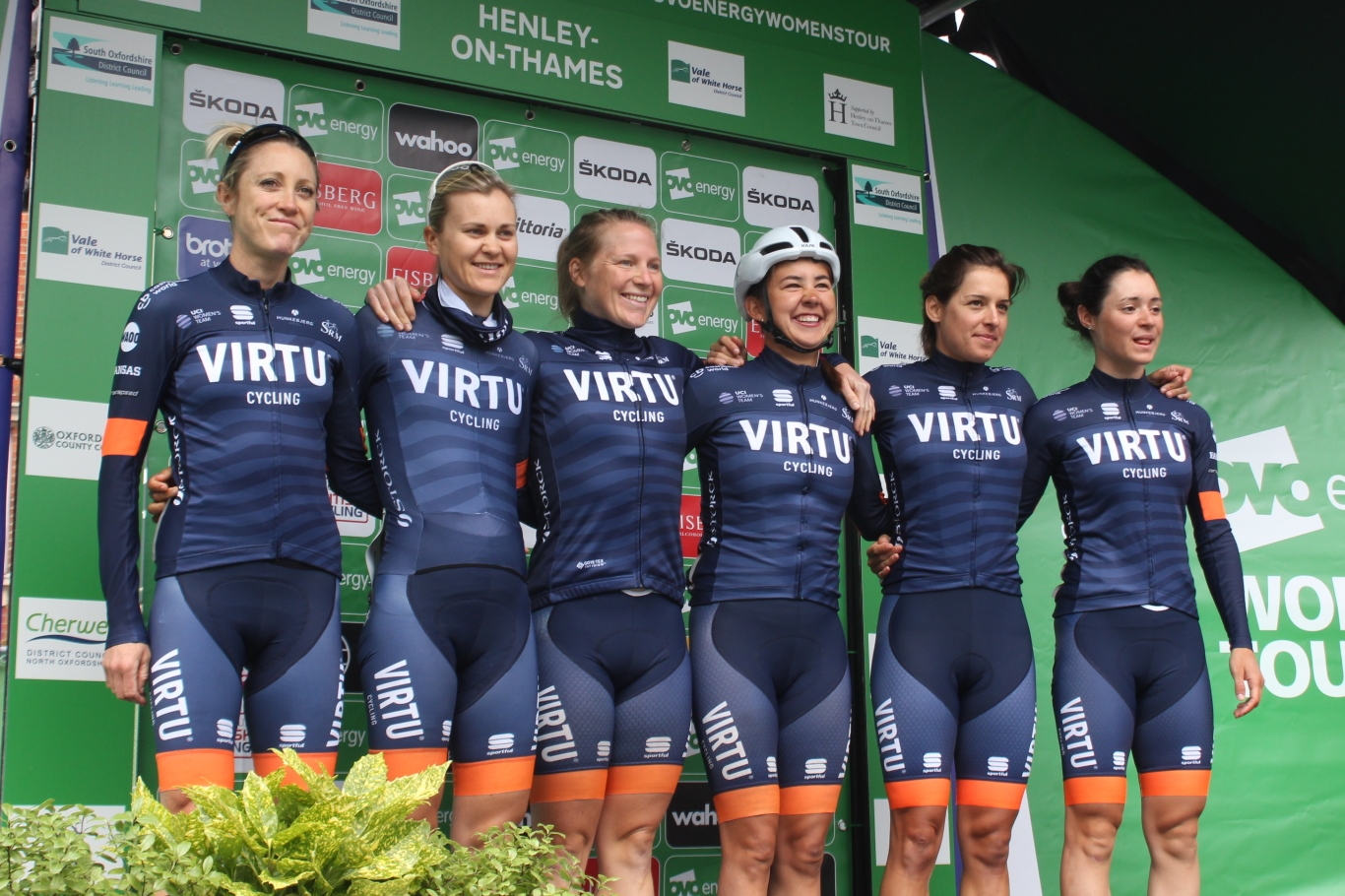

Team information
- UCI code: BMS (2015–2016); TVW (2017); TVC (2017–2019)
- Registered: Denmark
- Founded: 2015
- Disbanded: 2019
- Discipline: Road
- Status: National (2015); UCI Women (2016–2019)
- Bicycles: Storck
- Website: Team home page

Key personnel
- Team managers: Bo Handberg Madsen; Allan Porsmose; Carmen Small; Shani Bloch

Team name history
- 2015–2016 2017 2017–2019: Team BMS BIRN; Team VéloCONCEPT Women; Team Virtu Cycling Women

Team Virtu Cycling Women was a UCI Women's cycling team based in Denmark, that competed between 2015 and 2019.

== Team history ==
In November 2016 it was announced that Bjarne Riis and Lars Seier (Riis-Seier Project) took over the women's team BMS BIRN and the men's team Team Virtu Pro–Véloconcept, with the latter being renamed Team VéloCONCEPT and the former becoming Team VéloCONCEPT Women for the 2017 season. After the addition of a new investor into the team in September 2017, Brøndby IF football team chairman Jan Beck Andersen, the cycling team's name changed to Team Virtu Cycling.

== Final team roster ==
As of 3 March 2019.

Rider	Date of birth
Katrine Aalerud (NOR)	4 December 1994 (aged 25)
Marta Bastianelli (ITA)	30 April 1987 (aged 32)
Sofia Bertizzolo (ITA)	21 August 1997 (aged 22)
Barbara Guarischi (ITA)	2 October 1990 (aged 29)
Anouska Koster (NED)	20 August 1993 (aged 26)
Mieke Kröger (GER)	18 July 1993 (aged 26)
Birgitte Krogsgaard (DNK)	27 October 1991 (aged 28)

Rider	Date of birth
Emilie Moberg (NOR)	12 July 1991 (aged 28)
Rachel Neylan (AUS)	9 March 1982 (aged 37)
Louise Norman Hansen (DNK)	12 February 1995 (aged 24)
Katarzyna Pawłowska (POL)	16 August 1989 (aged 30)
Sara Penton (SWE)	15 November 1988 (aged 31)
Trine Schmidt (DNK)	3 June 1988 (aged 31)
Christina Siggaard (DNK)	24 March 1994 (aged 25)

== Major wins ==
2016
Overall Tour de Feminin-O cenu Českého Švýcarska, Cecilie Uttrup Ludwig

Youth classification, Cecilie Uttrup Ludwig
Stages 1 & 5, Cecilie Uttrup Ludwig

Mountains classification Ladies Tour of Norway, Cecilie Uttrup Ludwig

2017
Combativity classification, Stage 4 Holland Ladies Tour, Pernille Mathiesen

2018
Omloop Het Nieuwsblad, Christina Siggaard
Sprints classification Emakumeen Euskal Bira, Katarzyna Pawłowska

2019
Omloop van het Hageland, Marta Bastianelli
Women's WorldTour Ronde van Drenthe, Marta Bastianelli
Tour of Flanders, Marta Bastianelli
Stage 2 Healthy Ageing Tour, Mieke Kröger
Overall Gracia–Orlová, Marta Bastianelli

Stages 1 & 3, Marta Bastianelli
Stages 2a (ITT) & 4 Gracia–Orlová, Mieke Kröger
Stage 2b Gracia–Orlová, Rachel Neylan

Sprints classification Thüringen Rundfahrt der Frauen, Barbara Guarischi

Stage 1, Barbara Guarischi
Stage 2, Marta Bastianelli

Postnord UCI WWT Vårgårda WestSweden Road Race, Marta Bastianelli
Stage 4 Tour Cycliste Féminin International de l'Ardèche, Anouska Koster
Stage 5 Tour Cycliste Féminin International de l'Ardèche, Marta Bastianelli

== National and continental champions ==
2016
Denmark Time Trial, Cecilie Uttrup Ludwig
Denmark Junior Time Trial, Simone Eg

2017
Israel Time Trial, Shani Bloch-Davidov
USA Time Trial, Amber Neben
Denmark Road Race, Camilla Møllebro
Sweden Road Race, Sara Penton
European U23 Time Trial, Pernille Mathiesen
European U23 Road Race, Pernille Mathiesen

2019
Denmark Time Trial, Louise Norman Hansen
Italy Road Race, Marta Bastianelli
