= 2020 UCI Women's World Tour =

Series of women's road cycling races

- Fifth edition of the UCI Women's World Tour

Details
- Dates: 1 February – 8 November 2020
- Location: Europe; Australia
- Races: 11

Champions
- Individual champion: Lizzie Deignan (Great Britain) (Trek–Segafredo)
- Teams' champion: Trek–Segafredo

The 2020 UCI Women's World Tour was a competition that initially included twenty-one road cycling events throughout the 2020 women's cycling season. It was the fifth edition of the ranking system launched by the Union Cycliste Internationale (UCI) in 2016. The competition began with the Cadel Evans Great Ocean Road Race Women on 1 February. The schedule was extensively affected by the COVID-19 pandemic, which resulted in two-thirds of the races on the calendar being either postponed or cancelled outright. As a result, the season was extended until 8 November, when the final stage of the Ceratizit Challenge by la Vuelta took place.

Great Britain's Lizzie Deignan became the fifth rider in as many years to win the overall classification, amassing a tally of 1622.33 points for Trek–Segafredo. Deignan won consecutive races in August at the GP de Plouay and La Course by Le Tour de France, before adding a season-high third victory at Liège–Bastogne–Liège. Deignan finished 55 points clear of her Trek–Segafredo team mate Elisa Longo Borghini; Longo Borghini failed to win any overall classifications, recording a best finish of second place at the season-ending Ceratizit Challenge by la Vuelta. She also finished in third place at the Giro Rosa, and had six other top-ten finishes during the season. Lisa Brennauer of Ceratizit–WNT Pro Cycling finished third in the overall classification with 1424.67 points, after recording podium finishes in three of the season's final four races: third at Gent–Wevelgem, second at the Three Days of Bruges–De Panne, and victory at the Ceratizit Challenge by la Vuelta. From the 11 individual events, a total of 8 riders won races while the World Tour lead was held during the season by Liane Lippert (Team Sunweb), Deignan and Anna van der Breggen (Boels–Dolmans), who was the only other rider to win multiple races, at the Giro Rosa and La Flèche Wallonne.

With 28 points, Lippert was the winner of the youth classification for riders under the age of 23. Lippert led the classification from start to finish, having scored points in each of the first seven races on the schedule, including her overall victory at the season-opening Cadel Evans Great Ocean Road Race – the only race to be held prior to the COVID-19 pandemic-enforced stoppage of racing. Second place in the standings went to Mikayla Harvey with 22 points, who won the classification 3 times during the season, however her season was cut short following the disbandment of Équipe Paule Ka due to financial issues. Lorena Wiebes (Team Sunweb), the defending champion of the classification, finished third, following victories in each of the final two races. For the first time, Trek–Segafredo won the teams classification, with a total of 4380.98 points and Deignan's three victories. Second place went to Boels–Dolmans, the previous winners of the classification in each of the first four years of the UCI Women's World Tour, with 3177.02 points and four victories – van der Breggen's pair of victories, Jolien D'Hoore's win at Gent–Wevelgem, while Chantal van den Broek-Blaak won the Tour of Flanders. Team Sunweb completed the final top three with 2876.98 points and the two victories earned by Wiebes (Three Days of Bruges–De Panne) and Lippert. Other than Ceratizit–WNT Pro Cycling, Mitchelton–Scott were the other team to win during 2020 with Annemiek van Vleuten's victory at Strade Bianche.

== Events ==
For the 2020 season, the calendar consisted of 21 races, down from 23 in 2019. The RideLondon Classique lost its place in the Women's World Tour due to scheduling conflicts resulting from the Olympic races, and the Emakumeen Euskal Bira and Tour of California was cancelled due to financial pressures.

Due to the COVID-19 pandemic, the UCI announced that all UCI races in China in April and May would be cancelled or rescheduled, including the Tour of Chongming Island. Due to further outbreaks in Italy, Strade Bianche was postponed to an undetermined date, Trofeo Alfredo Binda-Comune di Cittiglio was delayed until June. On 12 March, the Ronde van Drenthe was cancelled due to the COVID-19 pandemic in the Netherlands. while all Belgian races were cancelled until 3 April, removing the Three Days of Bruges–De Panne (postponed to a later date), and Gent–Wevelgem from the schedule. The following day, The Women's Tour was postponed due to the COVID-19 pandemic in the United Kingdom. Three Belgian races were postponed on 17 March, with the Amstel Gold Race also postponed the following day. By mid-April, only one race had been completed, while thirteen other races had been either postponed or cancelled outright; no racing was rescheduled before July.

On 5 May 2020, a revised calendar was announced by the UCI, with 18 races to be held between 1 August and 8 November, including the introduction of a women's Paris–Roubaix. In June, in line with the men's race, the Tour of Guangxi was moved from 20 October to 10 November.

2020 UCI Women's World Tour
Race	Date	First	Second	Third	Leader
(Australia) Cadel Evans Great Ocean Road Race	1 February	Liane Lippert (GER)	Arlenis Sierra (CUB)	Amanda Spratt (AUS)	Liane Lippert (GER)
(Italy) Strade Bianche	1 August (Note: Strade Bianche was scheduled for 7 March, but was postponed due to the COVID-19 pandemic in Italy.)	Annemiek van Vleuten (NED)	Margarita Victoria García (ESP)	Leah Thomas (USA)	Liane Lippert (GER)
(France) GP de Plouay	25 August (Note: The GP de Plouay – Lorient Agglomération Trophée WNT was initially scheduled for 22 August, but was moved after that date was designated for national road cycling championships events.)	Lizzie Deignan (GBR)	Lizzy Banks (GBR)	Chiara Consonni (ITA)	Liane Lippert (GER)
La Course by Le Tour de France	29 August (Note: La Course by Le Tour de France was scheduled for 19 July, but was postponed after the Tour de France was postponed from its original dates.)	Lizzie Deignan (GBR)	Marianne Vos (NED)	Demi Vollering (NED)	Lizzie Deignan (GBR)
(Italy) Giro Rosa	11–19 September (Note: The Giro Rosa was initially scheduled for 26 June – 5 July.)	Anna van der Breggen (NED)	Katarzyna Niewiadoma (POL)	Elisa Longo Borghini (ITA)	Lizzie Deignan (GBR)
(Belgium) La Flèche Wallonne	30 September (Note: La Flèche Wallonne (22 April) and Liège–Bastogne–Liège (26 April) were rescheduled four days apart, after being postponed due to the COVID-19 pandemic in Belgium.)	Anna van der Breggen (NED)	Cecilie Uttrup Ludwig (DEN)	Demi Vollering (NED)	Anna van der Breggen (NED)
(Belgium) Liège–Bastogne–Liège	4 October	Lizzie Deignan (GBR)	Grace Brown (AUS)	Ellen van Dijk (NED)	Lizzie Deignan (GBR)
(Belgium) Gent–Wevelgem	11 October (Note: Gent–Wevelgem and the Tour of Flanders were scheduled for consecutive Sundays on 29 March and 5 April, but were postponed due to the COVID-19 pandemic in Belgium. These were rescheduled for consecutive Sundays in October.)	Jolien D'Hoore (BEL)	Lotte Kopecky (BEL)	Lisa Brennauer (GER)	Lizzie Deignan (GBR)
(Belgium) Tour of Flanders	18 October	Chantal van den Broek-Blaak (NED)	Amy Pieters (NED)	Lotte Kopecky (BEL)	Lizzie Deignan (GBR)
(Belgium) Three Days of Bruges–De Panne	20 October (Note: The Three Days of Bruges–De Panne was scheduled for 26 March, but was postponed due to the COVID-19 pandemic in Belgium.)	Lorena Wiebes (NED)	Lisa Brennauer (GER)	Lotte Kopecky (BEL)	Lizzie Deignan (GBR)
(Spain) Ceratizit Challenge by La Vuelta	6–8 November (Note: The Ceratizit Challenge by La Vuelta was scheduled for 5–6 September, but was postponed after the Vuelta a España was postponed from its original dates.)	Lisa Brennauer (GER)	Elisa Longo Borghini (ITA)	Lorena Wiebes (NED)	Lizzie Deignan (GBR)

=== Cancelled events ===
Three events that were initially postponed in the first half of 2020, due to the COVID-19 pandemic, were not able to rescheduled during the season; these were the Ronde van Drenthe due to be held on 15 March, the Trofeo Alfredo Binda-Comune di Cittiglio due to be held on 2 June (initially 22 March), and The Women's Tour due to be held from 8 to 13 June.

Following the release of the revised calendar on 5 May, the Postnord UCI WWT Vårgårda West Sweden TTT and Postnord UCI WWT Vårgårda West Sweden, scheduled for 8 and 9 August, were cancelled on 14 May. The Ladies Tour of Norway, scheduled between 13–16 August, was cancelled on 4 June. The Holland Ladies Tour, scheduled for 1–6 September (initially 25–30 August), was cancelled on 27 July. In August, the Chinese races at the Tour of Chongming Island (23–25 October, initially 7–9 May) and the Tour of Guangxi (10 November, initially 20 October) were cancelled. On 30 September, the Amstel Gold Race (initially scheduled for 19 April, and then rescheduled to 10 October), was cancelled following a surge of cases attributed to the COVID-19 pandemic in the Netherlands. On 9 October, the inaugural Paris–Roubaix (scheduled for 25 October) was delayed until 2021, following a surge of cases attributed to the COVID-19 pandemic in France.

== Points standings ==
For the 2020 season, a revised point-scoring system was introduced by the Union Cycliste Internationale (UCI). As had been the case since 2018, the top 40 riders in each race accumulated points towards the individual and team rankings. Instead of receiving 200 points, each race winner received 400 points, 320 points were given for a runner-up placing, 260 points for third place and so forth down to 8 points for finishes between 31st and 40th. There were also tweaks to the stage points and points for wearing the leader's jersey in stage races.

=== Individual ===
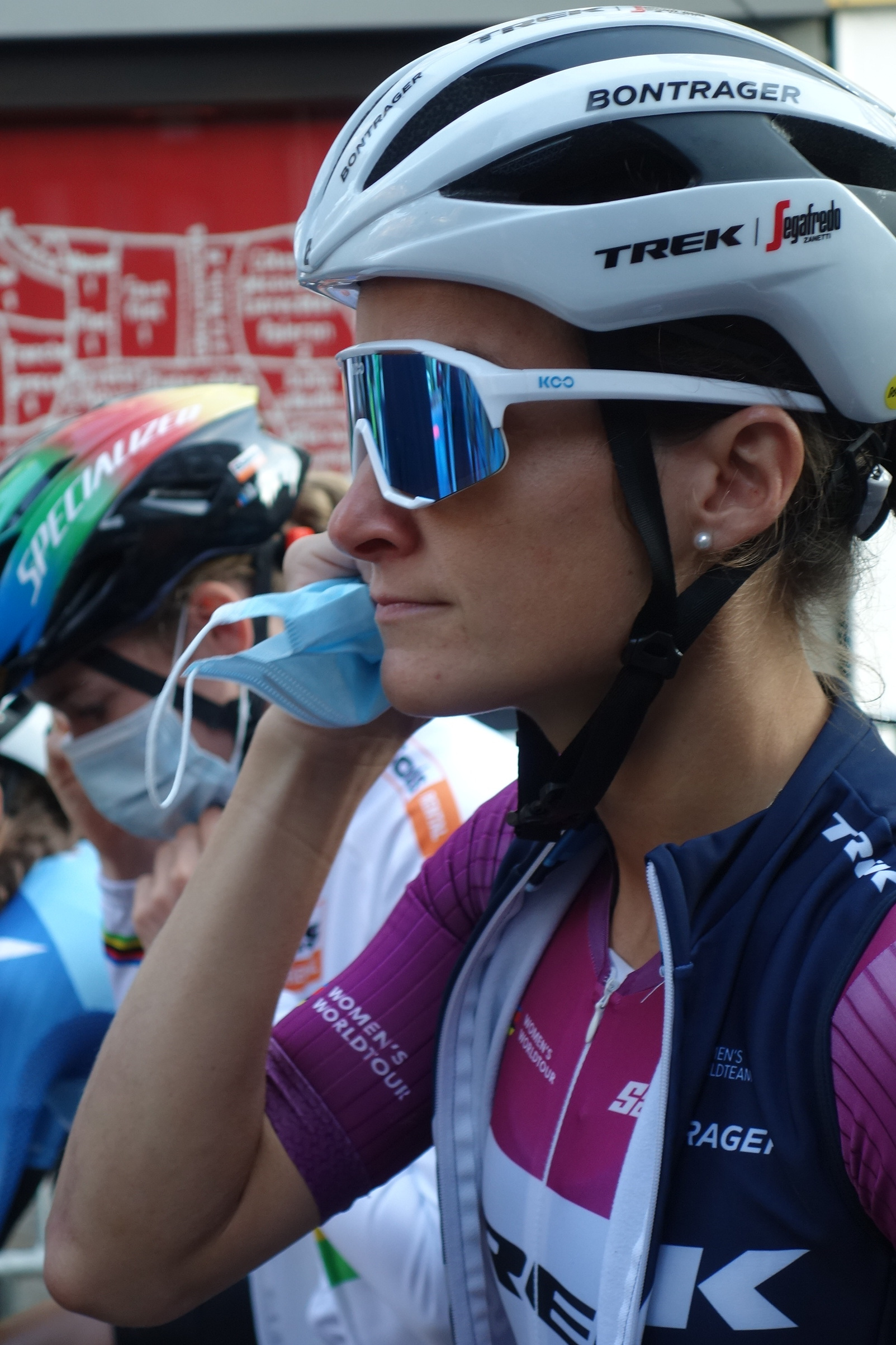
Lizzie Deignan (pictured at La Flèche Wallonne), the winner of the individual classification.

Riders tied with the same number of points were classified by number of victories, then number of second places, third places, and so on, in World Tour events and stages.

Individual rankings
Rank	Name	Team	Points
1	Lizzie Deignan (GBR)	Trek–Segafredo	1622.33
2	Elisa Longo Borghini (ITA)	Trek–Segafredo	1567.33
3	Lisa Brennauer (GER)	Ceratizit–WNT Pro Cycling	1424.67
4	Anna van der Breggen (NED)	Boels–Dolmans	1221.67
5	Lotte Kopecky (BEL)	Lotto–Soudal Ladies	1050
6	Marianne Vos (NED)	CCC - Liv	974.50
7	Annemiek van Vleuten (NED)	Mitchelton–Scott	942
8	Demi Vollering (NED)	Parkhotel Valkenburg	856
9	Liane Lippert (GER)	Team Sunweb	838.33
10	Cecilie Uttrup Ludwig (DEN)	FDJ Nouvelle-Aquitaine Futuroscope	832
11	Lorena Wiebes (NED)	Team Sunweb	814
12	Sarah Roy (AUS)	Mitchelton–Scott	777
13	Katarzyna Niewiadoma (POL)	Canyon//SRAM	747
14	Ellen van Dijk (NED)	Trek–Segafredo	718.33
15	Amy Pieters (NED)	Boels–Dolmans	704.67
16	Chantal van den Broek-Blaak (NED)	Boels–Dolmans	510.67
17	Mikayla Harvey (NZL)	Équipe Paule Ka	501.17
18	Leah Kirchmann (CAN)	Team Sunweb	463.33
19	Margarita Victoria García (ESP)	Alé BTC Ljubljana	459.33
20	Jolien D'Hoore (BEL)	Boels–Dolmans	454.67
179 riders scored points

=== Youth ===
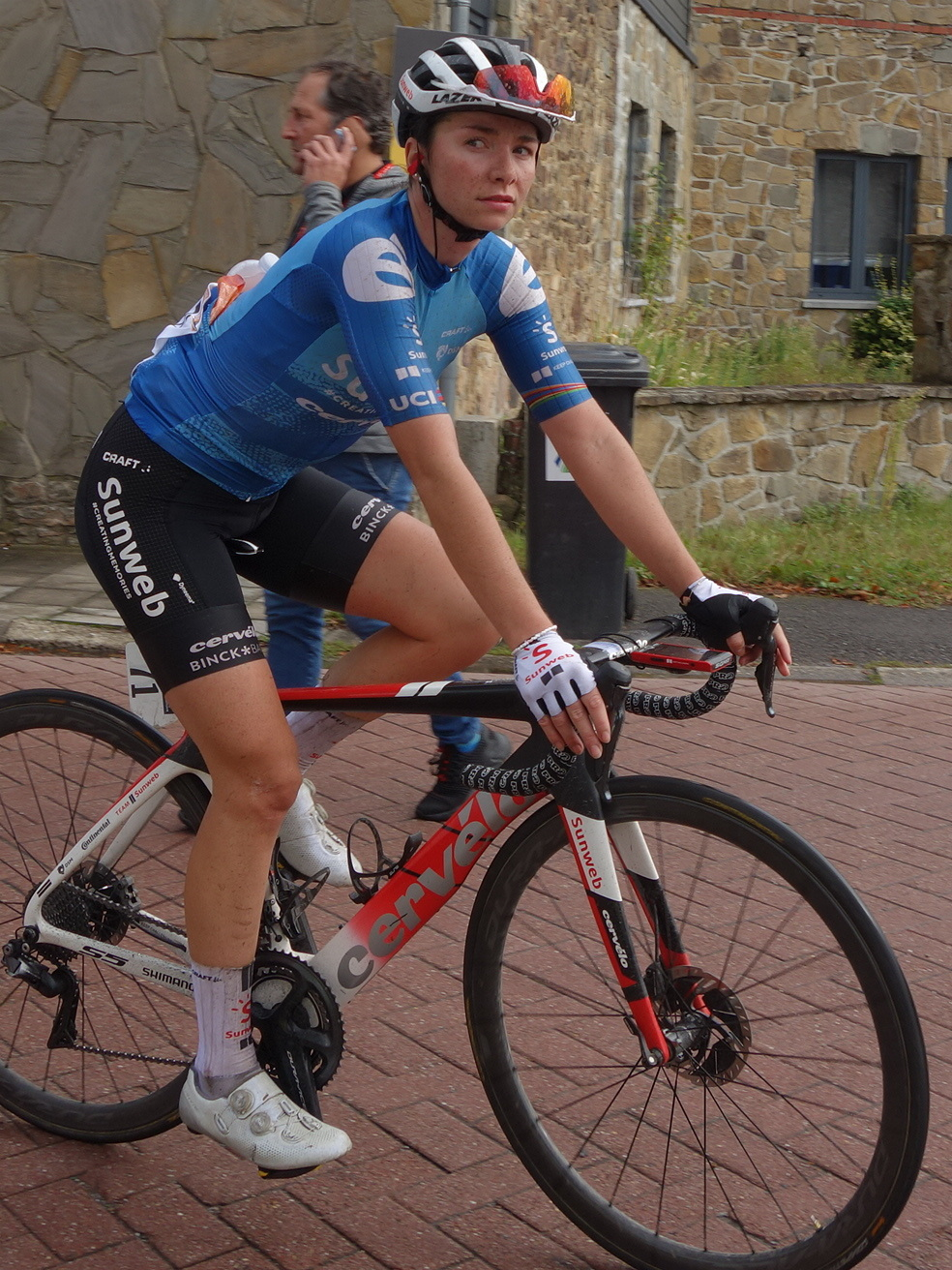
Liane Lippert (pictured at La Flèche Wallonne), the winner of the youth classification.

The top three riders in the final results of each World Tour event's young rider classification received points towards the standings. Six points were awarded to first place, four points to second place and two points to third place.

Youth rankings
Rank	Name	Team	Points
1	Liane Lippert (GER)	Team Sunweb	28
2	Mikayla Harvey (NZL)	Équipe Paule Ka	22
3	Lorena Wiebes (NED)	Team Sunweb	16
4	Marta Cavalli (ITA)	Valcar–Travel & Service	14
5	Juliette Labous (FRA)	Team Sunweb	8
6	Elisa Balsamo (ITA)	Valcar–Travel & Service	8
7	Chiara Consonni (ITA)	Valcar–Travel & Service	6
8	Vittoria Guazzini (ITA)	Valcar–Travel & Service	6
9	Maaike Boogaard (NED)	Alé BTC Ljubljana	4
10	Lonneke Uneken (NED)	Boels–Dolmans	4
11	Évita Muzic (FRA)	FDJ Nouvelle-Aquitaine Futuroscope	4
12	Ella Harris (NZL)	Canyon//SRAM	4
13	Clara Copponi (FRA)	FDJ Nouvelle-Aquitaine Futuroscope	2
14	Nicole Steigenga (NED)	Doltcini–Van Eyck–Proximus	2
15	Niamh Fisher-Black (NZL)	Équipe Paule Ka	2
16	Letizia Borghesi (ITA)	Aromitalia–Basso Bikes–Vaiano	2

=== Team ===
Team rankings were calculated by adding the ranking points of all the riders of a team in the table.

Rank	Team	Points	Scoring riders
1	Trek–Segafredo	4380.98	Deignan (1622.33), Longo Borghini (1567.33), van Dijk (718.33), Wiles (228.33), Winder (164.33), Cordon-Ragot (40.33), Henttala (32), Worrack (8)
2	Boels–Dolmans	3177.02	Van der Breggen (1221.67), Pieters (704.67), van den Broek-Blaak (510.67), D'Hoore (454.67), Canuel (94.67), Majerus (80), Uneken (48), Dideriksen (40), Buurman (22.67)
3	Team Sunweb	2876.98	13 riders Lippert (838.33), Wiebes (814), Kirchmann (463.33), Labous (221.33), Mackaij (169.33), Jackson (149.33), Rivera (53.33), Soek (48), Henderson (40), Georgi (24), Koch (24), Andersen (16), Olausson (16)
4	Mitchelton–Scott	2601	Van Vleuten (942), Roy (777), Brown (421), Spratt (311), Kennedy (77), Roberts (28), G. Williams (24), Ensing (16), Tenniglo (5)
5	CCC - Liv	2137	10 riders Vos (974.50), Moolman (368.50), Bertizzolo (196.50), S. Paladin (186.50), Lach (120), R. Markus (96), Rooijakkers (65.50), Stultiens (49.50), Korevaar (48), Demey (32)
6	Canyon//SRAM	1961	14 riders Niewiadoma (747), H. Barnes (275), A. Barnes (250), Cecchini (199), Amialiusik (191), Harris (80), Shapira (59), Ludwig (54), Cromwell (40), A. Ryan (31), Gafinovitz (16), Riffel (8), Erath (8), Klein (3)
7	Ceratizit–WNT Pro Cycling	1908.02	Brennauer (1424.67), Santesteban (188.67), Confalonieri (165.67), Magnaldi (67.67), Leth (40), Asencio (18), Vieceli (1.67), Wild (1.67)
8	Équipe Paule Ka	1648.02	Harvey (501.17), Banks (446.17), Thomas (276), Reusser (148.17), Fisher-Black (132.17), Chabbey (108.17), Norsgaard (36.17)
9	FDJ Nouvelle-Aquitaine Futuroscope	1558	11 riders Uttrup Ludwig (832), Fahlin (144), Muzic (134), Borgli (132), Duval (108), Chapman (92), Copponi (40), Kitchen (28), Gillow (24), Grossetête (16), Wiel (8)
10	Lotto–Soudal Ladies	1326	Kopecky (1050), A. Fidanza (172), Vandenbulcke (24), Beekhuis (24), Van de Velde (16), Parkinson (16), Christmas (16), Braam (8)
11	Valcar–Travel & Service	1279	10 riders Cavalli (426), Consonni (301), Balsamo (290), Guazzini (103), Sanguineti (100), Persico (32), Pollicini (16), Pirrone (9), Campbell (1), Malcotti (1)
12	Alé BTC Ljubljana	1229.98	10 riders García (459.33), Bastianelli (326), Bujak (211.33), Boogaard (125.33), Guderzo (41.33), Pintar (32), Chursina (24), Yonamine (8), Trevisi (1.33), Žigart (1.33)
13	Parkhotel Valkenburg	1056	Vollering (856), Kasper (56), Nilsson (40), van der Burg (32), A. Koster (32), K. Swinkels (24), F. Markus (8), Buysman (8)
14	Movistar Team	650	Aalerud (201), Erić (113), Patiño (106), Biannic (92), A. González (80), Guarischi (42), Merino (16)
15	Astana	527	Sierra (378), Ragusa (149)
16	Tibco–Silicon Valley Bank	480	Stephens (400), Faulkner (40), Gigante (16), Peñuela (16), Kessler (8)
17	Rally Cycling	156	Hosking (148), L. Williams (8)
18	Bepink	126	Zanardi (46), Valsecchi (24), Frapporti (24), Canvelli (16), Alessio (16)
19	Hitec Products–Birk Sport	115	Kröger (83), Heine (32)
20	Aromitalia–Basso Bikes–Vaiano	72	Leleivytė (64), Borghesi (8)
32 teams scored points
