= 2020 Challenge by La Vuelta =

2020 Ceratizit Challenge by La Vuelta
2020 UCI Women's World Tour, race 11 of 11

Race details
- Dates: 6–8 November 2020
- Stages: 3
- Distance: 191.8 km (119.2 mi)
- Winning time: 4h 29' 21"

Results
Jersey awarded to the overall winner	Winner	Lisa Brennauer (GER)	(Ceratizit–WNT Pro Cycling)
	Second	Elisa Longo Borghini (ITA)	(Trek–Segafredo)
	Third	Lorena Wiebes (NED)	(Team Sunweb)
Jersey awarded to the points classification winner	Points	Lisa Brennauer (GER)	(Ceratizit–WNT Pro Cycling)
	Team	Trek–Segafredo	

The 2020 Ceratizit Challenge by La Vuelta was a women's road cycling stage race held in and near the Spanish capital of Madrid from 6 to 8 November 2020. It was the sixth edition of the Challenge by La Vuelta.

A third day of racing was added, and the race dropped Madrid from the title to become the Challenge by La Vuelta as stages were held outside the borders of the Autonomous Community of Madrid. The rescheduled 2020 edition consisted of 2 short stages and an individual time trial. As with previous editions, the final day of the race coincided with the final day of the Vuelta a España.

== Teams ==
Six of the eight UCI Women's WorldTeams and ten UCI Women's Continental Teams participated in the race. Each team was allowed to enter six riders, although eight teams entered less: Cronos–Casa Dorada, Río Miera–Cantabria Deporte, Sopela Women's Team, and Team Sunweb each entered five, while Bizkaia–Durango, Doltcini–Van Eyck–Proximus, Hitec Products–Birk Sport, and Trek–Segafredo each entered four. This meant that there were 84 starters, of which 67 finished.

UCI Women's WorldTeams

- Alé BTC Ljubljana
- Canyon//SRAM
- Mitchelton–Scott
- Movistar Team
- Team Sunweb
- Trek–Segafredo

UCI Women's Continental Teams

- Bepink
- Bizkaia–Durango
- Ceratizit–WNT Pro Cycling
- Cronos–Casa Dorada
- Doltcini–Van Eyck–Proximus
- Hitec Products–Birk Sport
- Massi–Tactic
- Río Miera–Cantabria Deporte
- Sopela Women's Team
- Valcar–Travel & Service

== Route and organization ==
The race was increased from two stages in the past two editions to three in 2020, which race officials cited was due to the "uninterrupted growth dynamic that [the race] has maintained since its creation." The race started with a 83 km (52 mi) hilly stage from Toledo to Escalona, followed by the traditional 9.3 km (5.8 mi) individual time trial in Boadilla del Monte. The final stage was a 100.5 km (62.4 mi) criterium in Madrid that used the same finishing circuit that was used for stage 21 of the 2020 Vuelta.

The event was organised by ASO, which also organises the Vuelta a España. It was the 11th and final race of the 2020 UCI Women's World Tour.

Stage characteristics and winners
Stage	Date	Course	Distance	Type	Winner
1	6 November	Toledo to Escalona	83 km (52 mi)	Flat stage	Lorena Wiebes (NED)
2	7 November	Boadilla del Monte to Boadilla del Monte	9.3 km (5.8 mi)	Individual time trial	Lisa Brennauer (GER)
3	8 November	Madrid to Madrid	100.5 km (62.4 mi)	Flat stage	Elisa Balsamo (ITA)
Total		191.8 km (119.2 mi)			

== Stages ==
=== Stage 1 ===
6 November 2020 — Toledo to Escalona, 83 km (52 mi)

Stage 1 Result
Rank	Rider	Team	Time
1	Lorena Wiebes (NED)	Team Sunweb	2h 00' 16"
2	Elisa Balsamo (ITA)	Valcar–Travel & Service	+ 0"
3	Lisa Brennauer (GER)	Ceratizit–WNT Pro Cycling	+ 0"
4	Jelena Erić (SRB)	Movistar Team	+ 0"
5	Alice Barnes (GBR)	Canyon//SRAM	+ 3"
6	Silvia Zanardi (ITA)	Bepink	+ 4"
7	Alexis Ryan (USA)	Canyon//SRAM	+ 4"
8	Laura Asencio (FRA)	Ceratizit–WNT Pro Cycling	+ 4"
9	Vittoria Guazzini (ITA)	Valcar–Travel & Service	+ 4"
10	Sarah Roy (AUS)	Mitchelton–Scott	+ 4"

General classification after Stage 1
Rank	Rider	Team	Time
1	Lorena Wiebes (NED)	Team Sunweb	2h 00' 01"
2	Elisa Balsamo (ITA)	Valcar–Travel & Service	+ 5"
3	Lisa Brennauer (GER)	Ceratizit–WNT Pro Cycling	+ 10"
4	Jelena Erić (SRB)	Movistar Team	+ 15"
5	Alice Barnes (GBR)	Canyon//SRAM	+ 18"
6	Silvia Zanardi (ITA)	Bepink	+ 19"
7	Alexis Ryan (USA)	Canyon//SRAM	+ 19"
8	Laura Asencio (FRA)	Ceratizit–WNT Pro Cycling	+ 19"
9	Vittoria Guazzini (ITA)	Valcar–Travel & Service	+ 19"
10	Sarah Roy (AUS)	Mitchelton–Scott	+ 19"

=== Stage 2 ===
7 November 2020 — Boadilla del Monte to Boadilla del Monte, 9.3 km (5.8 mi) (ITT)

Stage 2 Result
Rank	Rider	Team	Time
1	Lisa Brennauer (GER)	Ceratizit–WNT Pro Cycling	12' 40"
2	Elisa Longo Borghini (ITA)	Trek–Segafredo	+ 1"
3	Ellen van Dijk (NED)	Trek–Segafredo	+ 4"
4	Annemiek van Vleuten (NED)	Mitchelton–Scott	+ 8"
5	Leah Kirchmann (CAN)	Team Sunweb	+ 14"
6	Sarah Roy (AUS)	Mitchelton–Scott	+ 18"
7	Mieke Kröger (GER)	Hitec Products–Birk Sport	+ 21"
8	Alice Barnes (GBR)	Canyon//SRAM	+ 25"
9	Maaike Boogaard (NED)	Alé BTC Ljubljana	+ 26"
10	Hannah Ludwig (GER)	Canyon//SRAM	+ 28"

General classification after Stage 2
Rank	Rider	Team	Time
1	Lisa Brennauer (GER)	Ceratizit–WNT Pro Cycling	2h 12' 51"
2	Elisa Longo Borghini (ITA)	Trek–Segafredo	+ 10"
3	Ellen van Dijk (NED)	Trek–Segafredo	+ 13"
4	Annemiek van Vleuten (NED)	Mitchelton–Scott	+ 17"
5	Lorena Wiebes (NED)	Team Sunweb	+ 18"
6	Leah Kirchmann (CAN)	Team Sunweb	+ 23"
7	Sarah Roy (AUS)	Mitchelton–Scott	+ 27"
8	Mieke Kröger (GER)	Hitec Products–Birk Sport	+ 30"
9	Alice Barnes (GBR)	Canyon//SRAM	+ 33"
10	Maaike Boogaard (NED)	Alé BTC Ljubljana	+ 35"

=== Stage 3 ===
8 November 2020 — Madrid to Madrid, 100.5 km (62.4 mi)

Stage 3 Result
Rank	Rider	Team	Time
1	Elisa Balsamo (ITA)	Valcar–Travel & Service	2h 16' 49"
2	Lorena Wiebes (NED)	Team Sunweb	+ 0"
3	Marta Bastianelli (ITA)	Alé BTC Ljubljana	+ 0"
4	Chiara Consonni (ITA)	Valcar–Travel & Service	+ 0"
5	Silvia Zanardi (ITA)	Bepink	+ 0"
6	Barbara Guarischi (ITA)	Movistar Team	+ 0"
7	Lisa Brennauer (GER)	Ceratizit–WNT Pro Cycling	+ 0"
8	Sandra Alonso (ESP)	Cronos–Casa Dorada	+ 0"
9	Jelena Erić (SRB)	Movistar Team	+ 0"
10	Elisa Longo Borghini (ITA)	Trek–Segafredo	+ 0"

General classification after Stage 3
Rank	Rider	Team	Time
1	Lisa Brennauer (GER)	Ceratizit–WNT Pro Cycling	4h 29' 21"
2	Elisa Longo Borghini (ITA)	Trek–Segafredo	+ 12"
3	Lorena Wiebes (NED)	Team Sunweb	+ 13"
4	Ellen van Dijk (NED)	Trek–Segafredo	+ 31"
5	Leah Kirchmann (CAN)	Team Sunweb	+ 42"
6	Annemiek van Vleuten (NED)	Mitchelton–Scott	+ 44"
7	Sarah Roy (AUS)	Mitchelton–Scott	+ 46"
8	Maaike Boogaard (NED)	Alé BTC Ljubljana	+ 52"
9	Alice Barnes (GBR)	Canyon//SRAM	+ 52"
10	Mieke Kröger (GER)	Hitec Products–Birk Sport	+ 57"

== Classification leadership table ==
Stage	Winner	General classification	Points classification	Teams classification
1	Lorena Wiebes	Lorena Wiebes	Lorena Wiebes	Ceratizit–WNT Pro Cycling
2	Lisa Brennauer	Lisa Brennauer	Lisa Brennauer	Trek–Segafredo
3	Elisa Balsamo	Lisa Brennauer	Lisa Brennauer	Trek–Segafredo
Final		Lisa Brennauer	Lisa Brennauer	Trek–Segafredo

- On stage 2, Elisa Balsamo, who was second in the points classification, wore the green jersey, because first placed Lorena Wiebes wore the red jersey as the leader of the general classification.
- On stage 3, Lorena Wiebes, who was second in the points classification, wore the green jersey, because first placed Lisa Brennauer wore the red jersey as the leader of the general classification.

== Final classification standings ==
Legend
Denotes the winner of the general classification	Denotes the winner of the points classification

=== General classification ===
Final general classification (1–10)
Rank	Rider	Team	Time
1	Lisa Brennauer (GER)	Ceratizit–WNT Pro Cycling	4h 29' 21"
2	Elisa Longo Borghini (ITA)	Trek–Segafredo	+ 12"
3	Lorena Wiebes (NED)	Team Sunweb	+ 13"
4	Ellen van Dijk (NED)	Trek–Segafredo	+ 31"
5	Leah Kirchmann (CAN)	Team Sunweb	+ 42"
6	Annemiek van Vleuten (NED)	Mitchelton–Scott	+ 44"
7	Sarah Roy (AUS)	Mitchelton–Scott	+ 46"
8	Maaike Boogaard (NED)	Alé BTC Ljubljana	+ 52"
9	Alice Barnes (GBR)	Canyon//SRAM	+ 52"
10	Mieke Kröger (GER)	Hitec Products–Birk Sport	+ 57"

=== Points classification ===
Final points classification (1–10)
Rank	Rider	Team	Points
1	Lisa Brennauer (GER)	Ceratizit–WNT Pro Cycling	38
2	Lorena Wiebes (NED)	Team Sunweb	36
3	Elisa Longo Borghini (ITA)	Trek–Segafredo	30
4	Elisa Balsamo (ITA)	Valcar–Travel & Service	15
5	Silvia Zanardi (ITA)	Bepink	14
6	Hannah Ludwig (GER)	Canyon//SRAM	13
7	Jessica Roberts (GBR)	Mitchelton–Scott	11
8	Janneke Ensing (NED)	Mitchelton–Scott	9
9	Maaike Boogaard (NED)	Alé BTC Ljubljana	8
10	Wilma Olausson (SWE)	Team Sunweb	8

=== Teams classification ===
Final teams classification (1–10)
Rank	Team	Time
1	(United States) Trek–Segafredo	13h 30' 16"
2	(Australia) Mitchelton–Scott	+ 26"
3	(Germany) Team Sunweb	+ 32"
4	(Germany) Canyon//SRAM	+ 1' 02"
5	(Italy) Alé BTC Ljubljana	+ 1' 23"
6	(Italy) Valcar–Travel & Service	+ 1' 30"
7	(Germany) Ceratizit–WNT Pro Cycling	+ 1' 30"
8	(Spain) Movistar Team	+ 2' 19"
9	(Norway) Hitec Products–Birk Sport	+ 2' 43"
10	(Italy) Bepink	+ 2' 58"

== See also ==
- 2020 in women's road cycling
