= 2020 Gent–Wevelgem (women's race) =

Cycling race

2020 UCI Women's World Tour, race 8 of 11

Race details
- Dates: 11 October 2020
- Stages: 1
- Distance: 141.1 km (87.7 mi)
- Winning time: 3h 33' 15"

Results
	Winner	Jolien D'Hoore (BEL)	(Boels–Dolmans)
	Second	Lotte Kopecky (BEL)	(Lotto–Soudal Ladies)
	Third	Lisa Brennauer (GER)	(Ceratizit–WNT Pro Cycling)

The ninth edition of the Gent–Wevelgem's women's race was held on Sunday 11 October 2020, rescheduled from the original date of 29 March 2020 due to the COVID-19 pandemic. In the rescheduled season, it was the eight event of the 2020 UCI Women's World Tour.

== Route ==
Due to the COVID-19 pandemic in Belgium, the race organisers had asked spectators to follow the race from home and had not released any information on the course to the public before the race started. The start times of the races were also adapted to avoid a clash with the 2020 Giro d'Italia. For the first time, the men's race started before the women's race.

== Teams ==
Eight UCI Women's WorldTeams and sixteen UCI Women's Continental Teams were to compete in the race. However, due to a positive covid-19 test in the team, Alé BTC Ljubljana decided to pull out of the race.

UCI Women's WorldTeams

- Canyon//SRAM
- CCC - Liv
- FDJ Nouvelle-Aquitaine Futuroscope
- Mitchelton–Scott
- Movistar Team
- Team Sunweb
- Trek–Segafredo

UCI Women's Continental Teams

- Astana
- Boels–Dolmans
- Ceratizit–WNT Pro Cycling
- Chevalmeire Cycling Team
- Ciclotel
- Cogeas–Mettler–Look
- Doltcini–Van Eyck–Proximus
- Drops
- Équipe Paule Ka
- Hitec Products–Birk Sport
- Lotto–Soudal Ladies
- Multum Accountants–LSK Ladies
- NXTG Racing
- Parkhotel Valkenburg
- Tibco–Silicon Valley Bank
- Valcar–Travel & Service

== Results ==
Result
Rank	Rider	Team	Time
1	Jolien D'Hoore (BEL)	Boels–Dolmans	3h 33' 15"
2	Lotte Kopecky (BEL)	Lotto–Soudal Ladies	+ 0"
3	Lisa Brennauer (GER)	Ceratizit–WNT Pro Cycling	+ 0"
4	Sarah Roy (AUS)	Mitchelton–Scott	+ 0"
5	Marta Cavalli (ITA)	Valcar–Travel & Service	+ 0"
6	Lauren Stephens (USA)	Tibco–Silicon Valley Bank	+ 0"
7	Demi Vollering (NED)	Parkhotel Valkenburg	+ 0"
8	Lizzie Deignan (GBR)	Trek–Segafredo	+ 0"
9	Amy Pieters (NED)	Boels–Dolmans	+ 5"
10	Elisa Longo Borghini (ITA)	Trek–Segafredo	+ 8"

== See also ==
- 2020 in women's road cycling
