= 2020 La Flèche Wallonne Femmes =

Cycling race

2020 UCI Women's World Tour, race 6 of 11
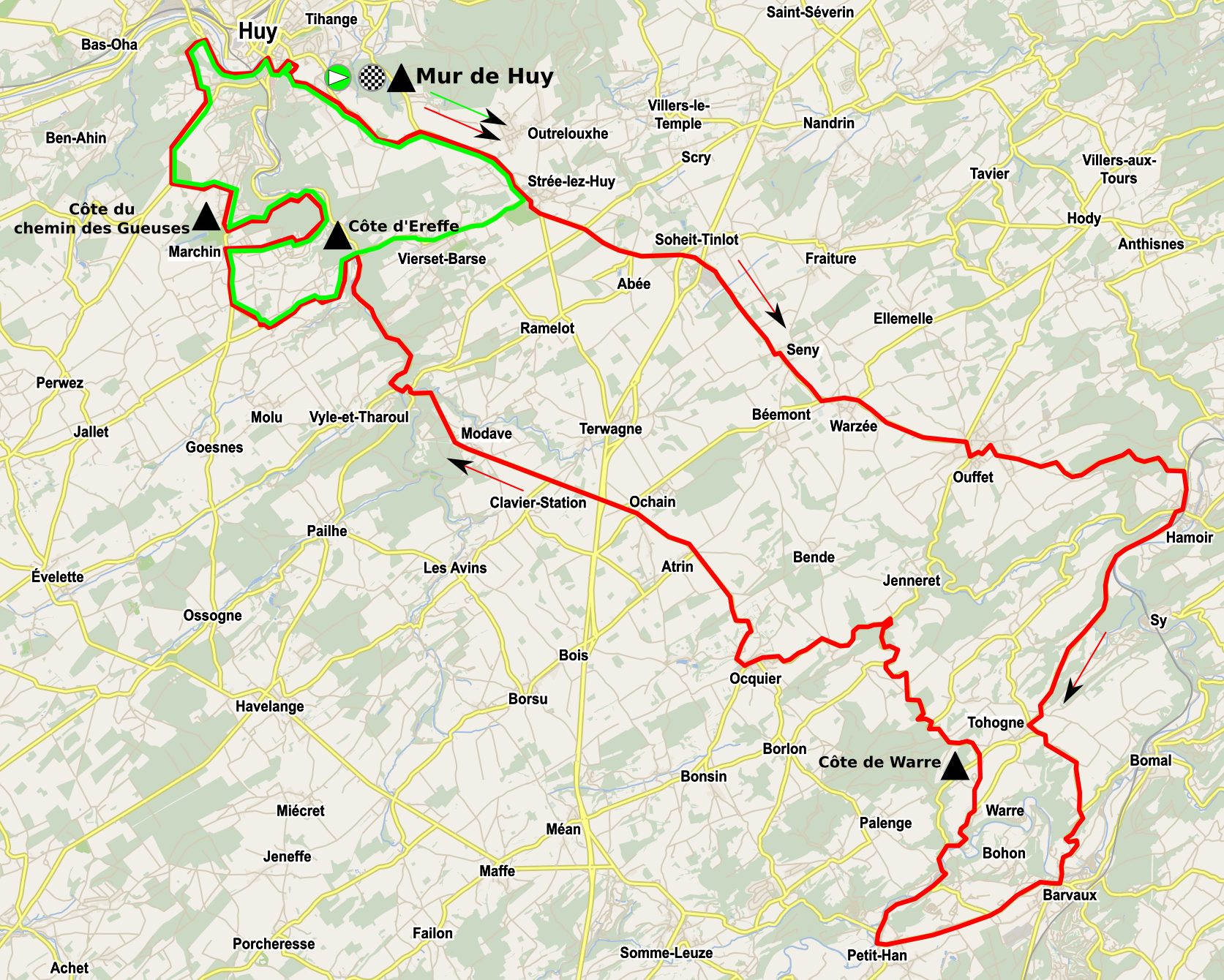

Race details
- Dates: 30 September 2020
- Stages: 1
- Distance: 124 km (77 mi)
- Winning time: 3h 17' 28"

Results
| | Winner | Anna van der Breggen (NED) | (Boels–Dolmans) |
| | Second | Cecilie Uttrup Ludwig (DEN) | (FDJ Nouvelle-Aquitaine Futuroscope) |
| | Third | Demi Vollering (NED) | (Parkhotel Valkenburg) |

Youtube race summary

The 23rd running of the women's Flèche wallonne was originally planned on 22 April 2020, but was rescheduled to 30 September 2020 due to the COVID-19 pandemic. The race started and finished in Huy. The route featured seven categorized climbs, including two ascents of the Mur de Huy. The finish line was on the top of the final ascent of the Mur. For the first time in its 23-year history, the women's race was broadcast live. The organisation provided almost an hour of live coverage.

The race was won for the sixth consecutive time by Dutch rider Anna van der Breggen.

== Route ==
The race started and finished in Huy, following a similar route as the 2019 race. The final 32 km loop was covered twice, totalling 124 km.

There were 7 categorised climbs:

- 45 km: Côte de Warre – 2.2 km climb at 4.9%
- 72.5 km: Côte d'Ereffe – 2.1 km climb at 5%
- 82 km: Côte de Cherave – 1.3 km climb at 8.1%
- 92 km: Mur de Huy – 1.3 km climb at 9.6%
- 104.5 km: Côte d'Ereffe – 2.1 km climb at 5%
- 114 km: Côte de Cherave – 1.3 km climb at 8.1%
- 124 km: Mur de Huy – 1.3 km climb at 9.6%

== Teams ==
Eight UCI Women's WorldTeams and sixteen UCI Women's Continental Teams competed.

UCI Women's WorldTeams

- Alé BTC Ljubljana
- Canyon//SRAM
- CCC - Liv
- FDJ Nouvelle-Aquitaine Futuroscope
- Mitchelton–Scott
- Movistar Team
- Team Sunweb
- Trek–Segafredo

UCI Women's Continental Teams

- Arkéa Pro Cycling Team
- Aromitalia–Basso Bikes–Vaiano
- Astana
- Boels–Dolmans
- Ceratizit–WNT Pro Cycling
- Charente-Maritime Women Cycling
- Chevalmeire Cycling Team
- Ciclotel
- Cogeas–Mettler–Look
- Doltcini–Van Eyck–Proximus
- Équipe Paule Ka
- Lotto–Soudal Ladies
- Massi–Tactic
- Parkhotel Valkenburg
- Tibco–Silicon Valley Bank
- Valcar–Travel & Service

== Result ==
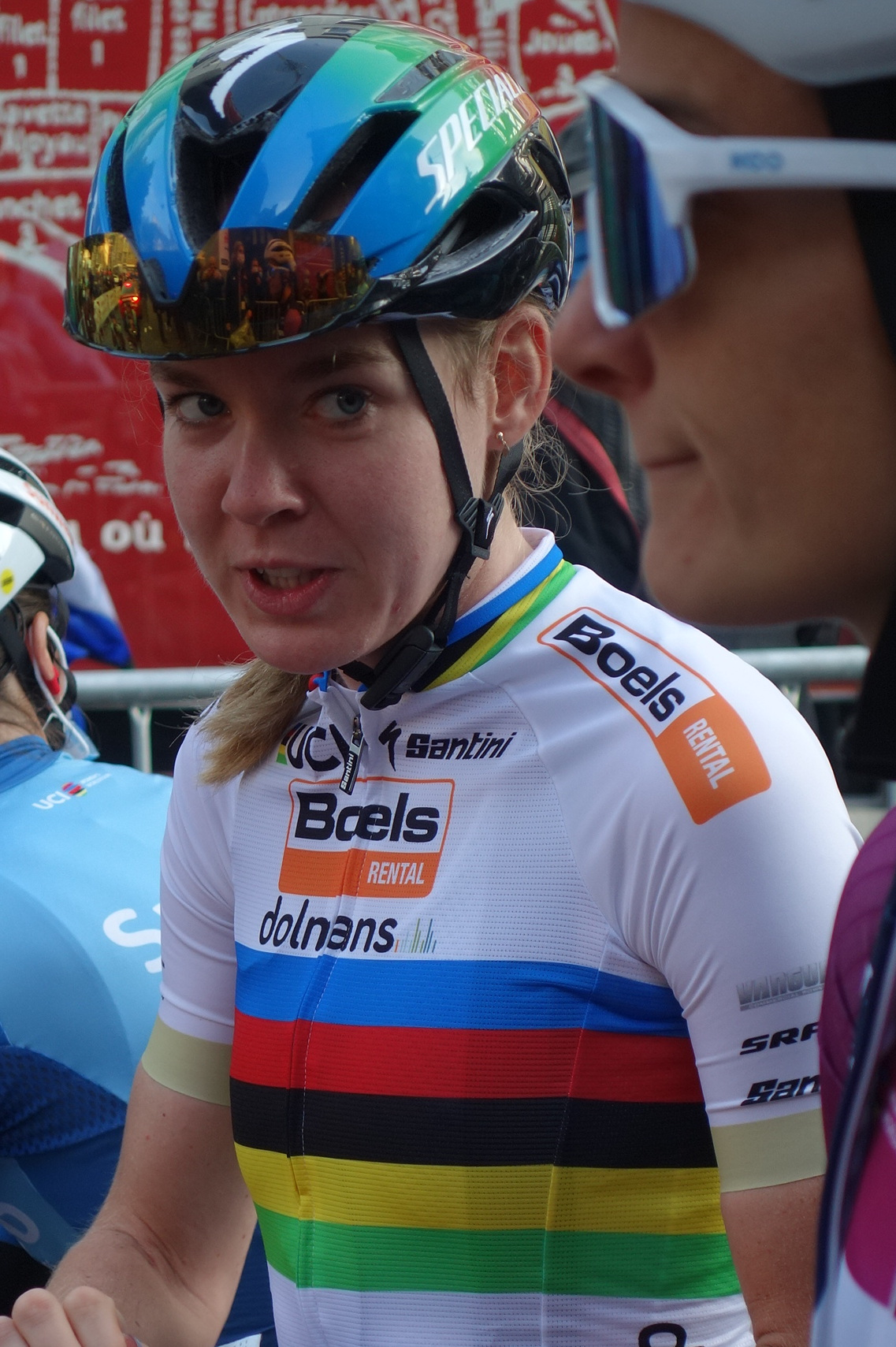
Anna van der Breggen at the start.

Final general classification

| Rank | Rider | Team | Time |
|---|---|---|---|
| 1 | Anna van der Breggen (NED) | Boels–Dolmans | 3h 17' 28" |
| 2 | Cecilie Uttrup Ludwig (DEN) | FDJ Nouvelle-Aquitaine Futuroscope | + 2" |
| 3 | Demi Vollering (NED) | Parkhotel Valkenburg | + 6" |
| 4 | Lizzie Deignan (UK) | Trek–Segafredo | + 11" |
| 5 | Elisa Longo Borghini (ITA) | Trek–Segafredo | + 11" |
| 6 | Ashleigh Moolman-Pasio (RSA) | CCC - Liv | + 11" |
| 7 | Mikayla Harvey (NZL) | Équipe Paule Ka | + 21" |
| 8 | Liane Lippert (GER) | Team Sunweb | + 18" |
| 9 | Marianne Vos (NED) | CCC - Liv | + 22" |
| 10 | Katarzyna Niewiadoma (POL) | Canyon//SRAM | + 25" |

== See also ==
- 2020 in women's road cycling
