= 2020 Three Days of Bruges–De Panne (women's race) =

2020 Women's Three Days of Bruges–De Panne
2020 UCI Women's World Tour, race 10 of 11

Race details
- Dates: 20 October 2020
- Stages: 1
- Distance: 155 km (96 mi)
- Winning time: 3h 39' 43"

Results
	Winner	Lorena Wiebes (NED)	(Team Sunweb)
	Second	Lisa Brennauer (GER)	(Ceratizit–WNT Pro Cycling)
	Third	Lotte Kopecky (BEL)	(Lotto–Soudal Ladies)

The third running of the women's event of the Three Days of Bruges–De Panne, also called Lotto Women Classic Bruges–De Panne, was held on 20 October 2020. It was the tenth race of the rescheduled 2020 UCI Women's World Tour. The race was won by Dutch rider Lorena Wiebes of Team Sunweb in a sprint finish.

== Teams ==
17 teams, consisting of seven of the eight UCI Women's WorldTeams and ten UCI Women's Continental Teams, competed in the race. Most teams competed with six riders; the exceptions were Multum Accountants–LSK Ladies and NXTG Racing with five each, and Cogeas–Mettler–Look with four. 69 of the 98 participants finished.

UCI Women's WorldTeams

- Alé BTC Ljubljana
- Canyon//SRAM
- CCC - Liv
- FDJ Nouvelle-Aquitaine Futuroscope
- Mitchelton–Scott
- Team Sunweb
- Trek–Segafredo

UCI Women's Continental Teams

- Boels–Dolmans
- Ceratizit–WNT Pro Cycling
- Ciclotel
- Cogeas–Mettler–Look
- Doltcini–Van Eyck–Proximus
- Hitec Products–Birk Sport
- Lotto–Soudal Ladies
- Multum Accountants–LSK Ladies
- NXTG Racing
- Parkhotel Valkenburg
- Valcar–Travel & Service

== Results ==
Result
Rank	Rider	Team	Time
1	Lorena Wiebes (NED)	Team Sunweb	3h 39' 43"
2	Lisa Brennauer (GER)	Ceratizit–WNT Pro Cycling	+ 0"
3	Lotte Kopecky (BEL)	Lotto–Soudal Ladies	+ 0"
4	Sarah Roy (AUS)	Mitchelton–Scott	+ 0"
5	Sofia Bertizzolo (ITA)	CCC - Liv	+ 0"
6	Alice Barnes (GBR)	Canyon//SRAM	+ 0"
7	Elisa Longo Borghini (ITA)	Trek–Segafredo	+ 0"
8	Ellen van Dijk (NED)	Trek–Segafredo	+ 0"
9	Alison Jackson (CAN)	Team Sunweb	+ 0"
10	Eugénie Duval (FRA)	FDJ Nouvelle-Aquitaine Futuroscope	+ 0"
