= Valentina Landuzzi =

Italian cyclist

Personal information
- Born: 18 May 1994 (age 32)

Cycling career
- Sport: Cycling
- Discipline: Road
- Role: Rider

Professional team
- 2020: Bepink

Valentina Landuzzi (born 18 May 1994) is an Italian professional racing cyclist, who most recently rode for UCI Women's Continental Team Bepink. In August 2020, she rode in the 2020 Strade Bianche Women's race in Italy.
