= 2020 in cycling =

2020 in cycling included the following:

- 2020 in men's road cycling
- 2020 in women's road cycling
