= 2020 La Course by Le Tour de France =

Cycling race

2020 UCI Women's World Tour, race 4 of 11
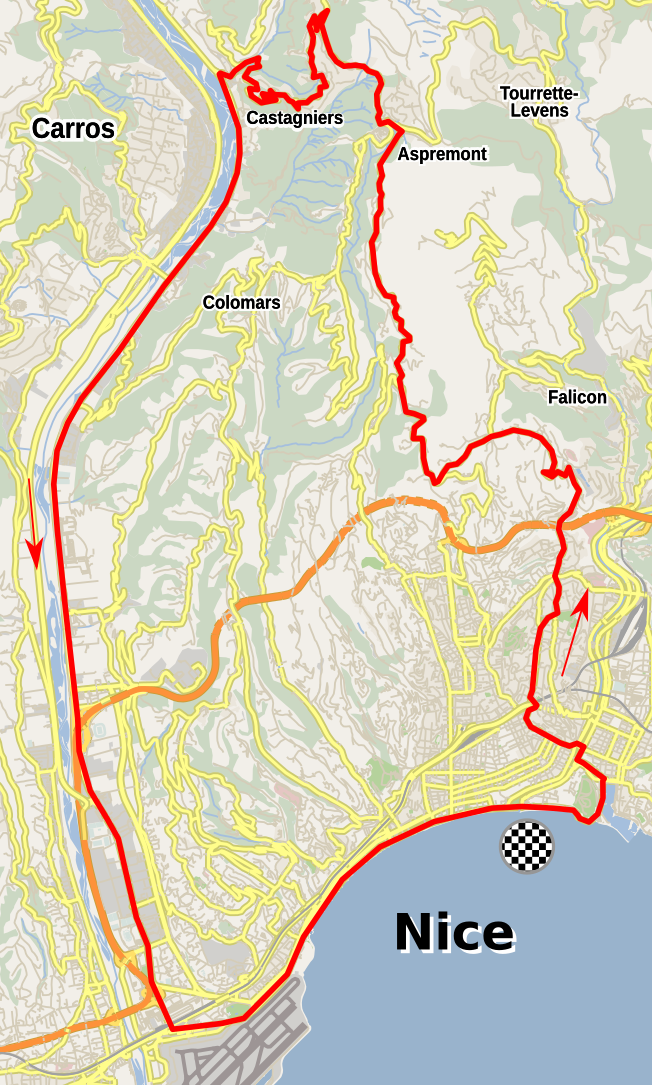

Race details
- Dates: 29 August 2020
- Stages: 1
- Distance: 96 km (60 mi)
- Winning time: 2h 22' 51"

Results
	Winner	Lizzie Deignan (GBR)	(Trek–Segafredo)
	Second	Marianne Vos (NED)	(CCC - Liv)
	Third	Demi Vollering (NED)	(Parkhotel Valkenburg)

The 2020 La Course by Le Tour de France was the seventh edition of La Course by Le Tour de France, a women's cycling race held in France. It took place on 29 August 2020 and was the fourth event on the 2020 UCI Women's World Tour. The event was organised by ASO, which also organises the Tour de France. Originally, the event was supposed held on 19 July, but was postponed due to the COVID-19 pandemic in France.

The race was won by British rider Lizzie Deignan of Trek–Segafredo in a sprint finish.

== Route ==
The race started and finished in Nice, taking in two laps of a hilly circuit covering 96 km (60 mi) in total. It was held before stage 1 of the men's 2020 Tour de France, which took in three laps of the same circuit.

The original route for the race would have taken place in Paris featuring circuits along the Champs-Élysées, a choice that was criticised by the professional peloton.

== Teams ==
Eight UCI Women's WorldTeams and fifteen UCI Women's Continental Teams made up the twenty-three teams that competed in the race. Each team entered six riders except for CCC - Liv and Tibco–Silicon Valley Bank, which entered five each. Of the 136 riders in the race, only 62 finished, while a further 51 riders finished over the time limit.

UCI Women's WorldTeams

- Alé BTC Ljubljana
- Canyon//SRAM
- CCC - Liv
- FDJ Nouvelle-Aquitaine Futuroscope
- Mitchelton–Scott
- Movistar Team
- Team Sunweb
- Trek–Segafredo

UCI Women's Continental Teams

- Arkéa Pro Cycling Team
- Aromitalia–Basso Bikes–Vaiano
- Astana
- Bizkaia–Durango
- Boels–Dolmans
- Ceratizit–WNT Pro Cycling
- Charente-Maritime Women Cycling
- Cogeas–Mettler–Look
- Équipe Paule Ka
- Hitec Products–Birk Sport
- Lotto–Soudal Ladies
- Parkhotel Valkenburg
- Rally Cycling
- Tibco–Silicon Valley Bank
- Valcar–Travel & Service

== Results ==
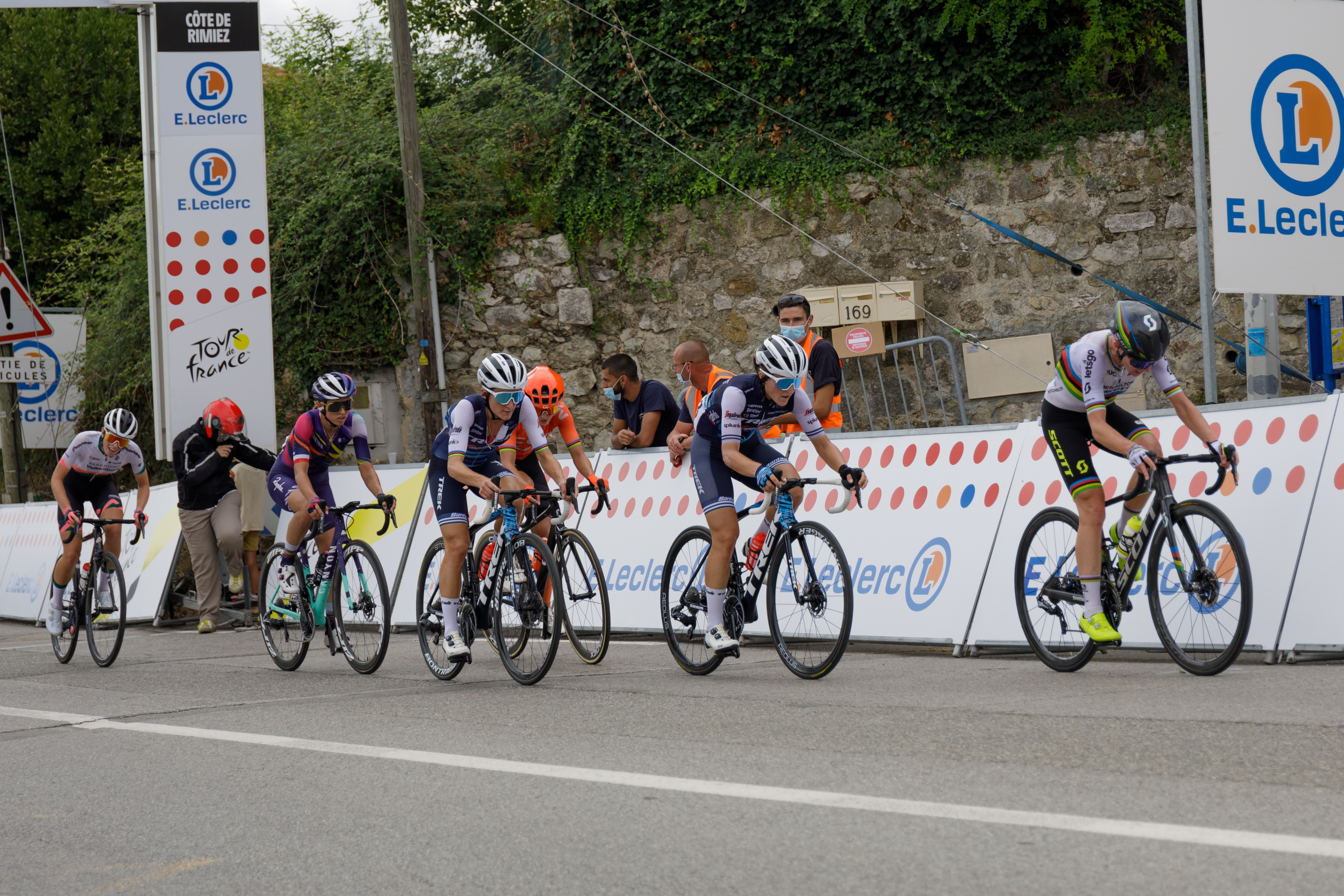
Annemiek van Vleuten leading the first group on the col de Rimiez

Result
Rank	Rider	Team	Time
1	Lizzie Deignan (GBR)	Trek–Segafredo	2h 22' 51"
2	Marianne Vos (NED)	CCC - Liv	+ 0"
3	Demi Vollering (NED)	Parkhotel Valkenburg	+ 0"
4	Katarzyna Niewiadoma (POL)	Canyon//SRAM	+ 0"
5	Annemiek van Vleuten (NED)	Mitchelton–Scott	+ 0"
6	Elisa Longo Borghini (ITA)	Trek–Segafredo	+ 7"
7	Emilia Fahlin (SWE)	FDJ Nouvelle-Aquitaine Futuroscope	+ 1' 50"
8	Elisa Balsamo (ITA)	Valcar–Travel & Service	+ 1' 50"
9	Soraya Paladin (ITA)	CCC - Liv	+ 1' 50"
10	Liane Lippert (GER)	Team Sunweb	+ 1' 50"

== Prize money ==
The total amount of prize money for the 2020 edition of the race was €20,000 The majority of the prize money was allocated according to the final result.

Finish place	prize money	Finish place	prize money
1	€ 6000	11	€ 145
2	€ 4000	12	€ 145
3	€ 2000	13	€ 145
4	€ 1000	14	€ 145
5	€ 750	15	€ 145
6	€ 650	16	€ 110
7	€ 525	17	€ 110
8	€ 350	18	€ 110
9	€ 270	19	€ 110
10	€ 180	20	€ 110

In addition to the 20 first finishers, there were also prizes in the Queen of the Mountains classification (€300, €200, and €100 for the first 3 riders on each of the two climbs) and a €2000 prize for the most combative competitor which was won by Annemiek van Vleuten.

== See also ==
- 2020 in women's road cycling
