= 2020 Tour of Flanders for Women =

Cycling race

2020 UCI Women's World Tour, race 9 of 11
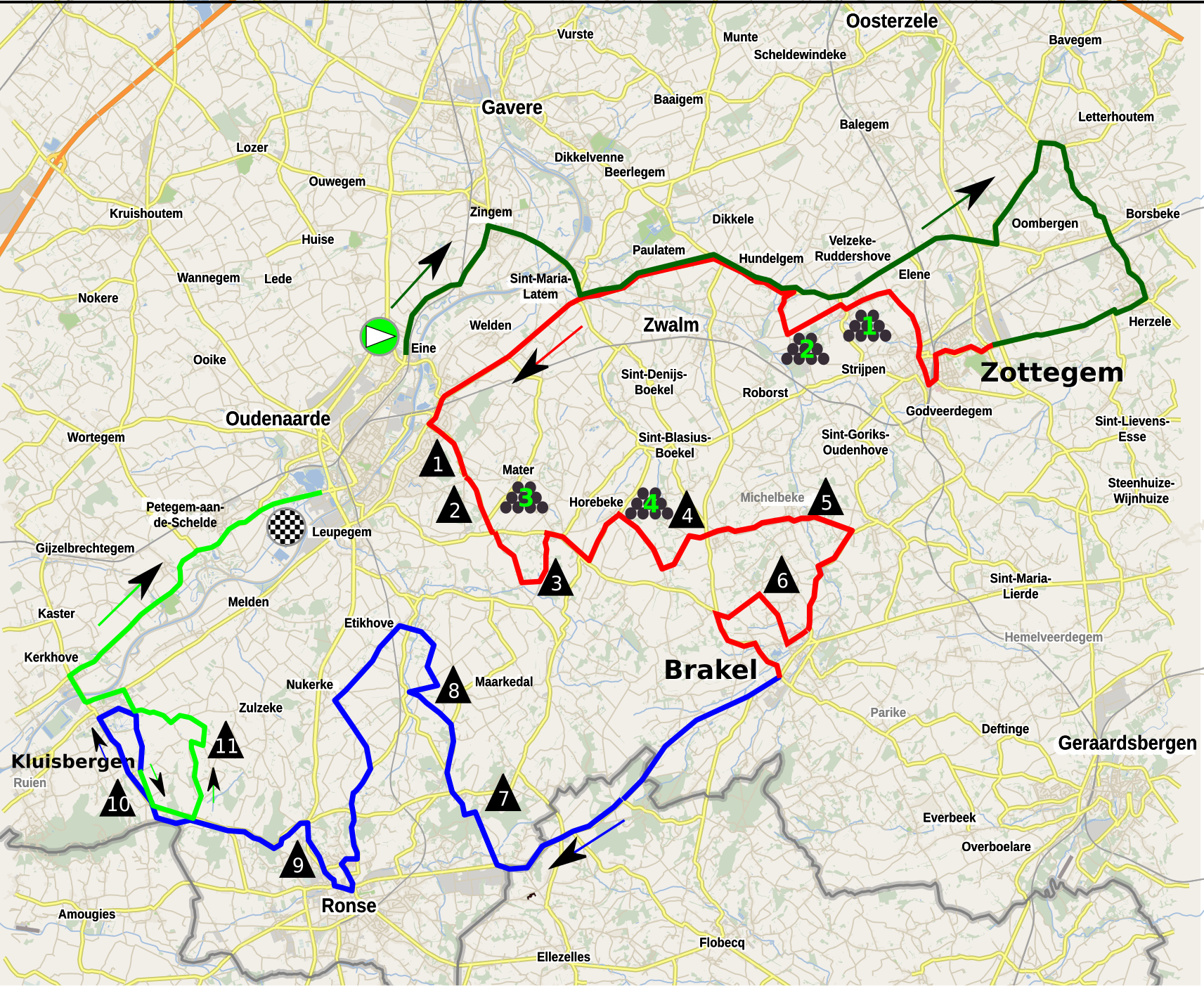

Race details
- Dates: 18 October 2020
- Stages: 1
- Distance: 135 km (84 mi)
- Winning time: 3h 29' 57"

Results
	Winner	Chantal van den Broek-Blaak (NED)	(Boels–Dolmans)
	Second	Amy Pieters (NED)	(Boels–Dolmans)
	Third	Lotte Kopecky (BEL)	(Lotto–Soudal Ladies)

The 17th running of the Tour of Flanders for Women, a women's cycling race in Belgium, was held on 18 October 2020, serving as the 9th event of the 2020 UCI Women's World Tour. Chantal van den Broek-Blaak of the Netherlands won the race, finishing just over a minute ahead of Amy Pieters.

The race was originally scheduled on 5 April 2020, but was postponed due to the COVID-19 pandemic. Because of the unprecedented intensity of the October campaign, the event is reduced by 20 km, cutting the Muur van Geraardsbergen from the route, bringing the distance to 135 km.

== Teams ==
Originally, eight UCI Women's WorldTeams and sixteen UCI Women's Continental Teams were set to compete in the race. Due to positive COVID-19 tests, Alé BTC Ljubljana, Astana and Chevalmeire Cycling Team decided to pull out of the race. Équipe Paule Ka was forced to pull out of the race after sponsor Paule Ka failed to fulfill their financial responsibilities forcing the team to fold on 16 October.

UCI Women's WorldTeams

- Canyon//SRAM
- CCC - Liv
- FDJ Nouvelle-Aquitaine Futuroscope
- Mitchelton–Scott
- Movistar Team
- Team Sunweb
- Trek–Segafredo

UCI Women's Continental Teams

- Boels–Dolmans
- Ceratizit–WNT Pro Cycling
- Ciclotel
- Cogeas–Mettler–Look
- Doltcini–Van Eyck–Proximus
- Hitec Products–Birk Sport
- Lotto–Soudal Ladies
- Massi–Tactic
- Multum Accountants–LSK Ladies
- Parkhotel Valkenburg
- Rally Cycling
- Tibco–Silicon Valley Bank
- Valcar–Travel & Service

== Results ==
Result
Rank	Rider	Team	Time
1	Chantal van den Broek-Blaak (NED)	Boels–Dolmans	3h 29' 57"
2	Amy Pieters (NED)	Boels–Dolmans	+ 1' 01"
3	Lotte Kopecky (BEL)	Lotto–Soudal Ladies	+ 1' 01"
4	Lisa Brennauer (GER)	Ceratizit–WNT Pro Cycling	+ 1' 01"
5	Sarah Roy (AUS)	Mitchelton–Scott	+ 1' 01"
6	Alena Amialiusik (BLR)	Canyon//SRAM	+ 1' 01"
7	Demi Vollering (NED)	Parkhotel Valkenburg	+ 1' 01"
8	Elisa Longo Borghini (ITA)	Trek–Segafredo	+ 1' 01"
9	Lauren Stephens (USA)	Tibco–Silicon Valley Bank	+ 1' 01"
10	Marta Cavalli (ITA)	Valcar–Travel & Service	+ 1' 01"

== See also ==
- 2020 in women's road cycling
