= Imogen Cotter =

Irish cyclist

Personal information
- Born: 5 July 1993 (age 33) London

Cycling career
- Sport: Cycling
- Discipline: Road
- Role: Rider

Professional teams
- 2020: Ciclotel
- 2022–2023: Plantur–Pura
- 2024: Hess Cycling Team

Major wins
- National Road Race Championship (2021)

Imogen Cotter (born 5 July 1993) is an Irish former professional racing cyclist.

Cotter was born in London to Irish parents and spent the first four years of her life there, before the family moved to Ruan, County Clare. Cotter won medals at All-Ireland cross-country and 3,000 and 5,000 metres running events in her teens before switching to track cycling in 2017. She was part of the Irish national track squad based in Mallorca in 2018 but was not selected for the European Championships and subsequently moved to Belgium, where she began to race for the Keukens Redant club. While based in Belgium and still an amateur rider, she won one of five places available at Movistar's e-cycling team through her performances on Zwift.

In October 2020, she rode in the Tour of Flanders for Women race in Belgium for Ciclotel, having recently joined the team for the rest of the season as a stagiaire.

In autumn 2021, shortly after winning the Irish National Road Race Championship, Cotter signed her first professional contract, with the Plantur–Pura team. However, before she could make her debut for the team, on 26 January 2022, during a training ride in Spain she suffered injuries including a broken patella and radius and ruptured tendons after being hit by a van that was driving on the wrong side of the road while overtaking another cyclist at 60 km/h (37 mph).

In January 2023, it was announced that Cotter would continue to ride for the Fenix–Deceuninck Development Team (a renamed Plantur–Pura) as she attempted to restart her career. Despite coming 14th in the Gracia–Orlová in April, Cotter then did not ride for Fenix-Deceuninck for two months due to the strength of the squad's roster, instead racing against men in Irish races to build fitness. In August 2023, she suffered injuries in a crash on the second stage of the Giro della Toscana, later telling the Irish Times that "I thought that that might be it for cycling". However, in November 2023, she signed a contract with the British-based Hess Cycling Team. She announced her retirement on 15 April 2024, citing continuing psychological trauma from the January 2022 incident.
