= 2020 Women's Herald Sun Tour =

Race details
- Dates: 5–6 February 2020
- Stages: 2
- Distance: 136.8 km (85.0 mi)

Results
Jersey awarded to the overall winner	Winner	Lucy Kennedy (AUS)	(Mitchelton–Scott)
	Second	Jaime Gunning (AUS)	(Specialized Women's Racing)
	Third	Arlenis Sierra (CUB)	(Astana)
Jersey awarded to the mountains classification winner	Mountains	Ella Harris (NZL)	(New Zealand (National Team))
Jersey awarded to the youth classification winner	Youth	Jaime Gunning (AUS)	(Specialized Women's Racing)
Jersey awarded to the sprints classification winner	Sprints	Arlenis Sierra (CUB)	(Astana)
	Team	Agolico	

The 2020 Women's Herald Sun Tour sponsored by Lexus of Blackburn was a women's cycle stage race held in Victoria, Australia, from 5 to 6 February 2020. The 2020 edition was the third edition of the race and centred around Shepparton and Falls Creek.

== Route ==
List of stages
Stage	Date	Course	Distance	Type	Winner	Team
1	5 February	Shepparton to Shepparton	92.8 km (57.7 mi)	Flat stage	Arlenis Sierra (CUB)	Astana
2	6 February	Falls Creek to Falls Creek	44 km (27.3 mi)	Hilly stage	Ella Harris (NZL)	New Zealand (National team)

== Classification leadership table ==
Stage	Winner	General classification	Sprint classification	Mountains classification	Young rider classification	Team classification
1	Arlenis Sierra	Arlenis Sierra	Arlenis Sierra	Not awarded	Ruby Roseman-Gannon	Specialized Women's Racing
2	Ella Harris	Lucy Kennedy	Arlenis Sierra	Ella Harris	Jaime Gunning	Agolico
Final		Lucy Kennedy	Arlenis Sierra	Ella Harris	Jaime Gunning	Agolico
