= 2020 GP de Plouay =

Cycling race

2020 UCI Women's World Tour, race 3 of 11

Race details
- Dates: 25 August 2020
- Stages: 1
- Distance: 101.1 km (62.8 mi)
- Winning time: 2h 43' 40"

Results
	Winner	Lizzie Deignan (UK)	(Trek–Segafredo)
	Second	Lizzy Banks (UK)	(Équipe Paule Ka)
	Third	Chiara Consonni (ITA)	(Valcar–Travel & Service)

The 2020 GP de Plouay featured as the third round of the 2020 UCI Women's World Tour and was held on 25 August 2020, in Plouay, France. The race was held on the same day as the men's Bretagne Classic, during the 2020 European Road Championships which were also held in Plouay.

== Teams ==
176 riders from 18 teams started the race. Each team has a maximum of six riders. 76 riders finished the race within the time limit.

UCI Women's WorldTeams

- Alé BTC Ljubljana
- Canyon//SRAM
- CCC - Liv
- FDJ Nouvelle-Aquitaine Futuroscope
- Mitchelton–Scott
- Movistar Team
- Team Sunweb
- Trek–Segafredo

UCI Women's Continental Teams

- Boels–Dolmans
- Parkhotel Valkenburg
- Arkéa Pro Cycling Team
- Cogeas–Mettler–Look
- Équipe Paule Ka
- Charente-Maritime Women Cycling
- Ceratizit–WNT Pro Cycling
- Valcar–Travel & Service
- Lotto–Soudal Ladies
- WCC Team

== Results ==
Final general classification

Rank	Rider	Team	Time
1	Lizzie Deignan (UK)	Trek–Segafredo	2h 43' 40"
2	Lizzy Banks (UK)	Équipe Paule Ka	s.t.
3	Chiara Consonni (ITA)	Valcar–Travel & Service	+ 1' 13"
4	Marta Bastianelli (ITA)	Alé BTC Ljubljana	s.t.
5	Elena Cecchini (ITA)	Canyon//SRAM	s.t.
6	Arianna Fidanza (ITA)	Lotto–Soudal Ladies	s.t.
7	Marta Lach (POL)	CCC - Liv	s.t.
8	Maria Giulia Confalonieri (ITA)	Ceratizit–WNT Pro Cycling	s.t.
9	Alicia Gonzalez (ESP)	Movistar Team	s.t.
10	Stine Borgli (NOR)	FDJ Nouvelle-Aquitaine Futuroscope	s.t.
