= Iuliia Galimullina =

Russian cyclist

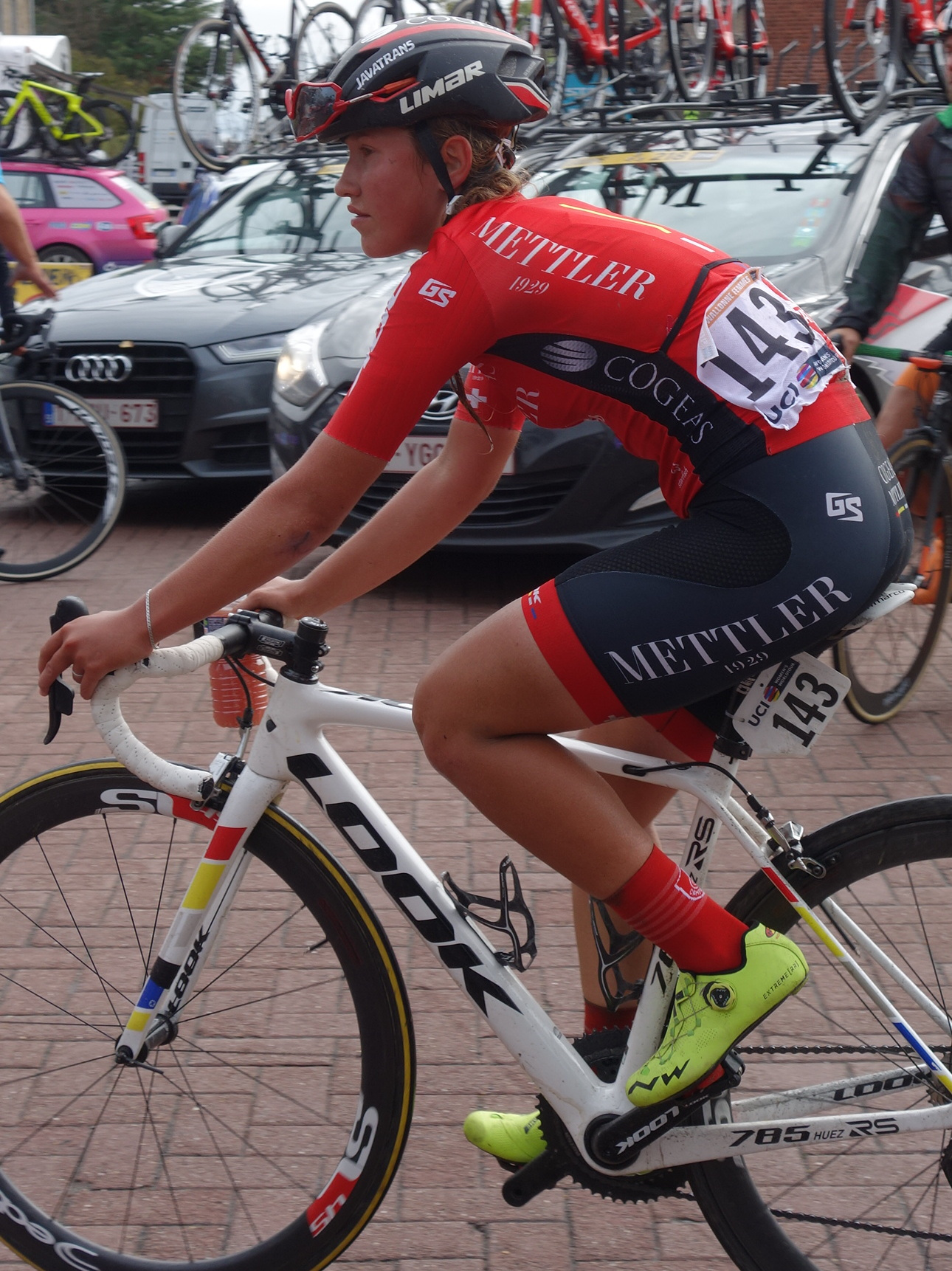
- Galimullina in 2020

Personal information
- Born: 20 September 2001 (age 25)

Cycling career
- Sport: Cycling
- Current team: Roland Le Dévoluy
- Discipline: Road
- Role: Rider

Professional team
- 2020–: Cogeas–Mettler–Look

Iuliia Galimullina (born 20 September 2001) is a Russian professional racing cyclist, who currently rides for UCI Women's Continental Team Roland Le Dévoluy. In October 2020, she rode in the women's edition of the 2020 Liège–Bastogne–Liège race in Belgium.
