= 2022 Ronde van Drenthe (women's race) =

2022 UCI Women's World Tour, race 2 of 23
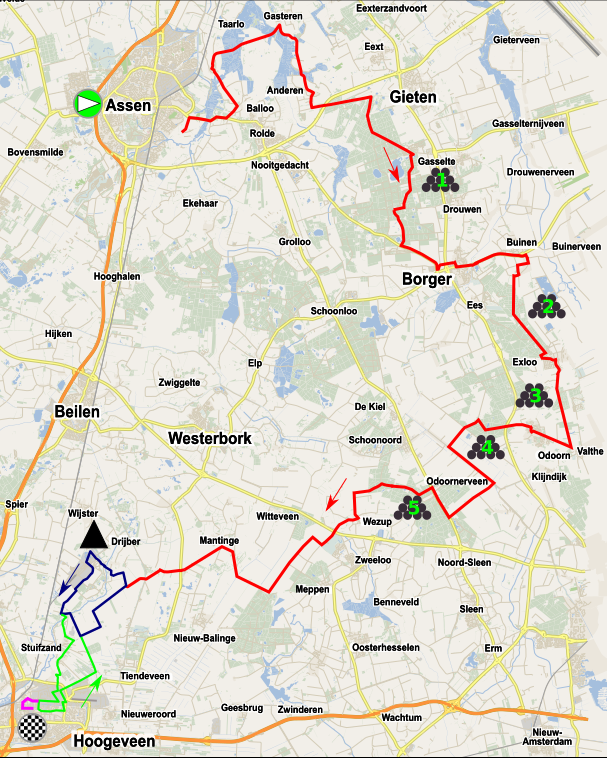

Race details
- Dates: 12 March 2022
- Stages: 1
- Distance: 156 km (97 mi)
- Winning time: 4h 03' 31"

Results
| | Winner | Lorena Wiebes (NED) | (Team DSM) |
| | Second | Elisa Balsamo (ITA) | (Trek–Segafredo) |
| | Third | Lotte Kopecky (BEL) | (SD Worx) |

The 2022 Ronde van Drenthe was a Dutch road cycling one-day race that took place on 12 March 2022. It was the 15th edition of Ronde van Drenthe and the 2nd event of the 2022 UCI Women's World Tour. It was won by Lorena Wiebes in a sprint finish.

== Teams ==
Eleven UCI Women's WorldTeams, seven UCI Women's Continental Teams, and the national Dutch team make up the twenty teams that will compete in the race. Three Women's WorldTeams, EF Education–Tibco–SVB, Roland Cogeas Edelweiss Squad and Team Movistar skipped this race.

UCI Women's WorldTeams

- Canyon//SRAM
- FDJ Nouvelle-Aquitaine Futuroscope
- Human Powered Health
- Liv Racing Xstra
- SD Worx
- Team BikeExchange–Jayco
- Team DSM
- Team Jumbo–Visma
- Trek–Segafredo
- UAE Team ADQ
- Uno-X Pro Cycling Team

UCI Women's Continental Teams

- Valcar–Travel & Service
- Ceratizit–WNT Pro Cycling
- Parkhotel Valkenburg
- Andy Schleck–CP NVST–Immo Losch
- Bizkaia–Durango
- GT Krush Tunap
- NXTG by Experza

National Teams

- Netherlands

== Route ==
The 156 kilometres (97 mi) route from Assen to Hoogeveen uses generally flat roads in the Drenthe region of the Netherlands, with the challenge being four ascents of the VAMberg - a hill built on a landfill site. The climb is 750m in length with an average gradient of 4.2% and a maximum gradient of 20%. Other difficulties are the ten cobbled sections on the route.

== Summary ==
The multiple ascents of the VAMberg climb led to a race full of attacks and breakaways. The distance from the last ascent of the climb to the finish in Hoogeveen was 14 km, with a four-woman group caught within the final kilometre. Lorena Wiebes of Team DSM outsprinted world champion Elisa Balsamo to win in a bunch sprint, despite a suffering puncture in the closing stages of the race.

== Result ==
Result
| Rank | Rider | Team | Time |
|---|---|---|---|
| 1 | Lorena Wiebes (NED) | Team DSM | 4h 03' 31" |
| 2 | Elisa Balsamo (ITA) | Trek–Segafredo | + 1" |
| 3 | Lotte Kopecky (BEL) | SD Worx | + 1" |
| 4 | Clara Copponi (FRA) | FDJ Nouvelle-Aquitaine Futuroscope | + 1" |
| 5 | Marta Bastianelli (ITA) | UAE Team ADQ | + 1" |
| 6 | Alice Barnes (GBR) | Canyon//SRAM | + 1" |
| 7 | Chiara Consonni (ITA) | Valcar–Travel & Service | + 1" |
| 8 | Nina Kessler (NED) | Team BikeExchange–Jayco | + 1" |
| 9 | Jip van den Bos (NED) | Team Jumbo–Visma | + 1" |
| 10 | Sarah Roy (AUS) | Canyon//SRAM | + 1" |
