= 2020 Strade Bianche Women =

Cycling race

2020 UCI Women's World Tour, race 2 of 11
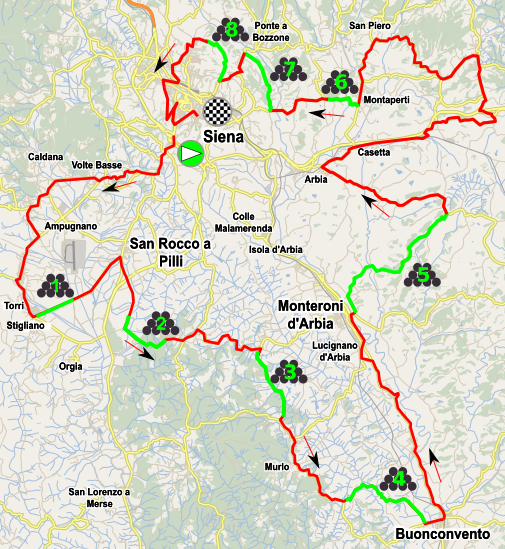

Race details
- Dates: ~~7 March 2020~~; 1 August 2020
- Stages: 1
- Distance: 136 km (85 mi)
- Winning time: 4h 03' 54"

Results
	Winner	Annemiek van Vleuten (NED)	(Mitchelton–Scott)
	Second	Margarita Victoria García (ESP)	(Alé BTC Ljubljana)
	Third	Leah Thomas (USA)	(Équipe Paule Ka)

== Race ==
Strade Bianche (both the men's race and the women's race) was originally scheduled for 7 March 2020 but was postponed to 1 August 2020 due to the COVID-19 pandemic.

== Route ==
Starting and finishing in Siena, Italy, Strade Bianche is the second event of the 2020 UCI Women's World Tour. The route is identical to that of the previous years, containing 30 km (19 mi) of gravel roads spread over eight sectors, for a total distance of 136 km (85 mi).

Sectors of strade bianche
No.	Name	Distance from		Length (km)	Category
No.	Name	Start (km)	Finish (km)	Length (km)	Category
1	Vidritta	17.6	118.4	2.1	*
2	Bagnaia	25	111.0	5.8	*
3	Radi	36.9	99.1	4.4	*
4	La piana	47.6	88.4	5.5	*
5	San Martino in Grania	67.5	68.5	9.5	*
6	Monteaperti	111.3	24.7	0.8	*
7	Colle Pinzuto	116.6	19.4	2.4	*
8	Le Tolfe	123.6	12.4	1.1	*

== Teams ==
Eight UCI Women's WorldTeams and fourteen UCI Women's Continental Teams made up the twenty-two teams that competed in the race. Most teams entered the maximum of six riders; however, Eurotarget–Bianchi–Vittoria and Servetto–Piumate–Beltrami TSA entered five each, while Astana, Cogeas–Mettler–Look, and Tibco–Silicon Valley Bank only entered four each. The day before the race, Ashleigh Moolman of CCC - Liv, Ella Harris of Canyon//SRAM, and Clara Koppenburg of Équipe Paule Ka sustained various injuries in separate training ride crashes and were forced to pull out of the race. This reduced the starting peloton to 121 riders. Of these riders, only 45 finished, while a further 13 riders finished over the time limit.

UCI Women's WorldTeams

- Alé BTC Ljubljana
- Canyon//SRAM
- CCC - Liv
- FDJ Nouvelle-Aquitaine Futuroscope
- Mitchelton–Scott
- Movistar Team
- Team Sunweb
- Trek–Segafredo

UCI Women's Continental Teams

- Aromitalia–Basso Bikes–Vaiano
- Astana
- Bepink
- Boels–Dolmans
- Ceratizit–WNT Pro Cycling
- Cogeas–Mettler–Look
- Équipe Paule Ka
- Eurotarget–Bianchi–Vittoria
- Lotto–Soudal Ladies
- Parkhotel Valkenburg
- Servetto–Piumate–Beltrami TSA
- Tibco–Silicon Valley Bank
- Top Girls Fassa Bortolo
- Valcar–Travel & Service

== Result ==
Result
Rank	Rider	Team	Time
1	Annemiek van Vleuten (NED)	Mitchelton–Scott	4h 03' 54"
2	Mavi García (ESP)	Alé BTC Ljubljana	+ 22"
3	Leah Thomas (USA)	Équipe Paule Ka	+ 1' 53"
4	Anna van der Breggen (NED)	Boels–Dolmans	+ 2' 05"
5	Elisa Longo Borghini (ITA)	Trek–Segafredo	+ 2' 11"
6	Marianne Vos (NED)	CCC - Liv	+ 2' 26"
7	Cecilie Uttrup Ludwig (DEN)	FDJ Nouvelle-Aquitaine Futuroscope	+ 2' 40"
8	Lisa Brennauer (GER)	Ceratizit–WNT Pro Cycling	+ 3' 26"
9	Karol-Ann Canuel (CAN)	Boels–Dolmans	+ 4' 20"
10	Marta Bastianelli (ITA)	Alé BTC Ljubljana	+ 5' 20"
