= Maaike Boogaard =

Dutch cyclist (born 1998)

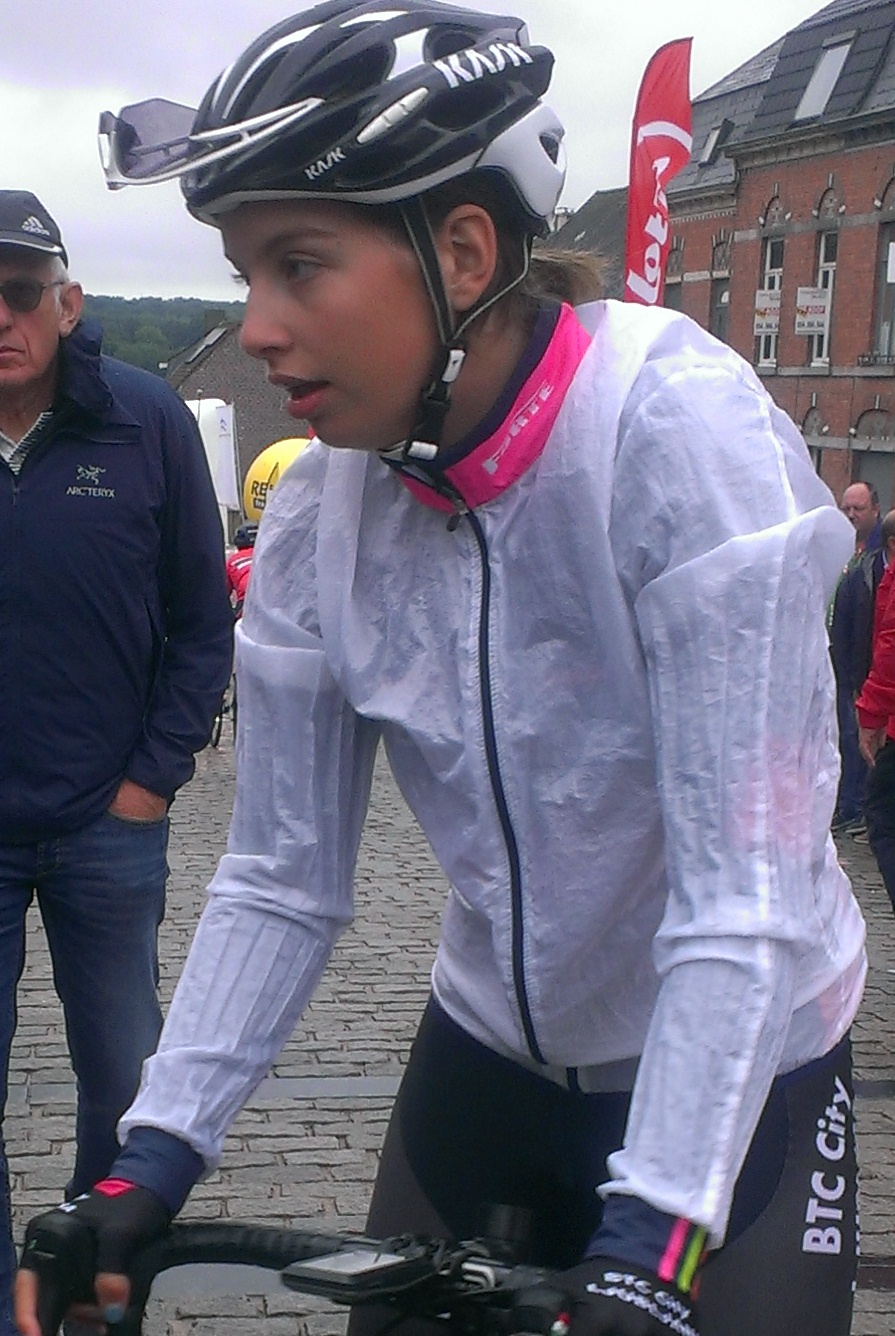
- Boogaard in 2017.

Personal information
- Full name: Maaike Boogaard
- Born: 24 August 1998 (age 28) Hoorn, Netherlands

Cycling career
- Sport: Cycling
- Current team: VolkerWessels Women Cyclingteam
- Discipline: Road
- Role: Rider

Professional teams
- 2017–2019: BTC City Ljubljana
- 2020–2022: Alé BTC Ljubljana
- 2023–2024: AG Insurance–Soudal–Quick-Step.
- 2025–: VolkerWessels Women Cyclingteam

Maaike Boogaard (born 24 August 1998) is a Dutch racing cyclist, who currently rides for UCI Women's ProTeam VolkerWessels Women Cyclingteam. She competed with BTC City Ljubljana in the women's team time trial event at the 2017 UCI Road World Championships.

== Major results ==
2013
4th Amstel Curaçao Race
2018
Combativity award Stage 2 The Women's Tour
2019
9th Time trial, European Under-23 Road Championships
9th Overall Tour of Chongming Island
9th Overall Vuelta a Burgos Feminas
2020
6th Time trial, European Under-23 Road Championships
8th Overall Challenge by La Vuelta
2022
1st Omloop van Borsele
8th Overall Grand Prix Elsy Jacobs
8th Overall Bretagne Ladies Tour
2023
3rd GP Oetingen
2024
1st Grand Prix International d'Isbergues
