= Alice Barnes =

English cyclist (born 1995)

Alice Wood
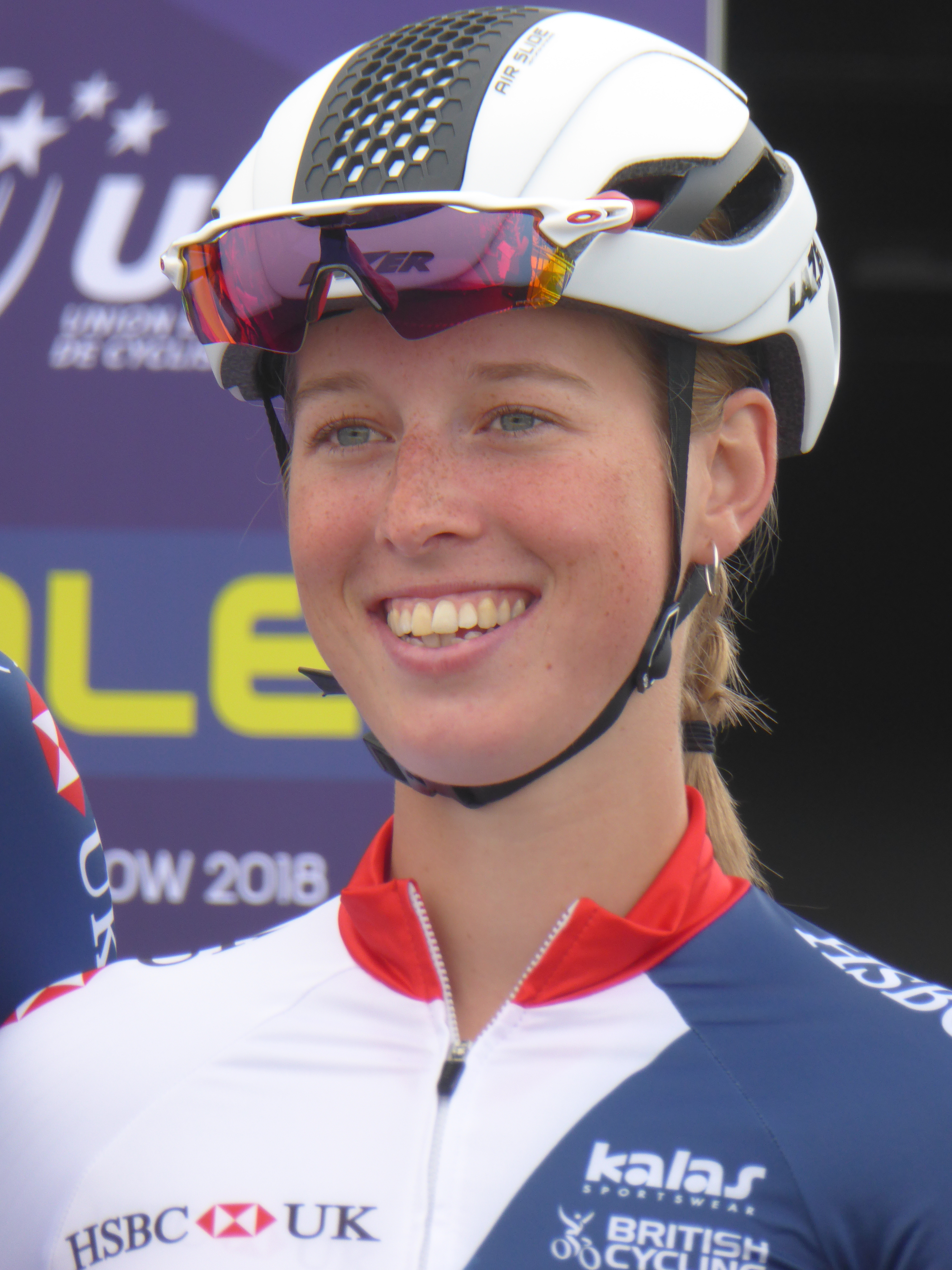
- Barnes at the 2018 European Road Cycling Championships.

Personal information
- Full name: Alice Wood
- Born: 17 July 1995 (age 31)

Cycling career
- Sport: Cycling
- Disciplines: Road; Mountain biking
- Role: Rider
- Rider type: All-rounder

Amateur teams
- 2012: Twenty3c–Orbea
- 2013: Scott Contessa Epic

Professional teams
- 2016–2017: Drops
- 2018–2022: Canyon//SRAM
- 2023–2024: Human Powered Health

Alice Wood (née Barnes) (born 17 July 1995) is an English former racing cyclist, who last rode for UCI Women's WorldTeam Human Powered Health.

== Career ==
Barnes enjoyed success at the UK School Games in Sheffield in 2011, where she not only won the individual mountain bike event, but also rode solo in the relay, beating the fastest of the four-rider teams by several seconds. She joined the British Cycling Olympic Academy Programme in 2013. Barnes was selected for the England team for the 2014 Commonwealth Games in Glasgow, where she finished fifth in the mountain bike race. She also rode at the 2014 UCI Road World Championships.

She finished second to Lizzie Armitstead in the elite women's race at the 2015 British National Road Race Championships in Lincoln, becoming national under-23 champion in the process. Later that year she was part of the Great Britain team that helped to deliver Armitstead to the World Championship elite road race title in Richmond, Virginia. On the road Barnes won the opening event of the Tour Series in Redditch. Racing in the 2017 National Women's Road Series, she won the Lincoln Grand Prix.

In September 2017, Barnes signed a contract with the Canyon//SRAM team. She remained with the team until the end of the 2022 season, before joining Human Powered Health on a two-year contract.

In June 2018, Barnes finished runner-up at the British National Time Trial Championships. Her older sister Hannah took the title.

== Personal life ==
She is the sister of fellow racing cyclist Hannah Barnes.

== Major results ==
2010
1st Cross-country, National Youth Mountain Bike Championships
2011
1st Cross-country, National Youth Mountain Bike Championships
2nd Criterium, National Youth Road Championships
National Youth Track Championships

2nd Madison (with Melissa Lowther)
2nd Points race

2013
1st Junior race, National Cyclo-cross Championships
2014
5th Cross-country, Commonwealth Games
7th Under-23 cross-country, UCI Mountain Bike & Trials World Championships
2015
National Road Championships

1st Under-23 road race
2nd Road race

2nd Cross-country, National Mountain Bike Championships
5th Women's Tour de Yorkshire
2016
National Road Championships

1st Under-23 road race
2nd Road race
2nd Criterium

1st London Nocturne
2nd Madison, National Track Championships (with Ellie Dickinson)
4th Women's Tour de Yorkshire
5th Overall Tour de Feminin-O cenu Českého Švýcarska
10th RideLondon Grand Prix
2017
2nd Overall BeNe Ladies Tour

1st Young rider classification
1st Stage 1

3rd Road race, UEC European Under-23 Road Championships
3rd Time trial, National Under-23 Road Championships
6th Overall The Women's Tour
7th Gent–Wevelgem
8th Ronde van Drenthe
9th Overall Women's Tour Down Under
2018
1st Team time trial, UCI Road World Championships
1st Stage 6 Thüringen Rundfahrt der Frauen
2nd Time trial, National Road Championships
9th RideLondon Classique
2019
National Road Championships

1st Road race
1st Time trial

2nd Vuelta a la Comunitat Valenciana Feminas
2nd Postnord UCI WWT Vårgårda West Sweden TTT
European Games

4th Road race
4th Time trial

UEC European Road Championships

5th Road race
9th Time trial

5th Overall Healthy Ageing Tour
2020
6th Three Days of Bruges–De Panne
9th Overall Challenge by La Vuelta
10th Grand Prix International d'Isbergues
2021
1st Stage 3 Setmana Ciclista Valenciana
7th Overall Healthy Ageing Tour
7th Overall The Women's Tour
8th Classic Brugge–De Panne
2022
5th Overall Bloeizone Fryslân Tour

1st Points classification

6th Ronde van Drenthe
8th Classic Brugge–De Panne
8th Le Samyn des Dames
10th Road race, Commonwealth Games
