= Wilma Olausson =

Swedish cyclist

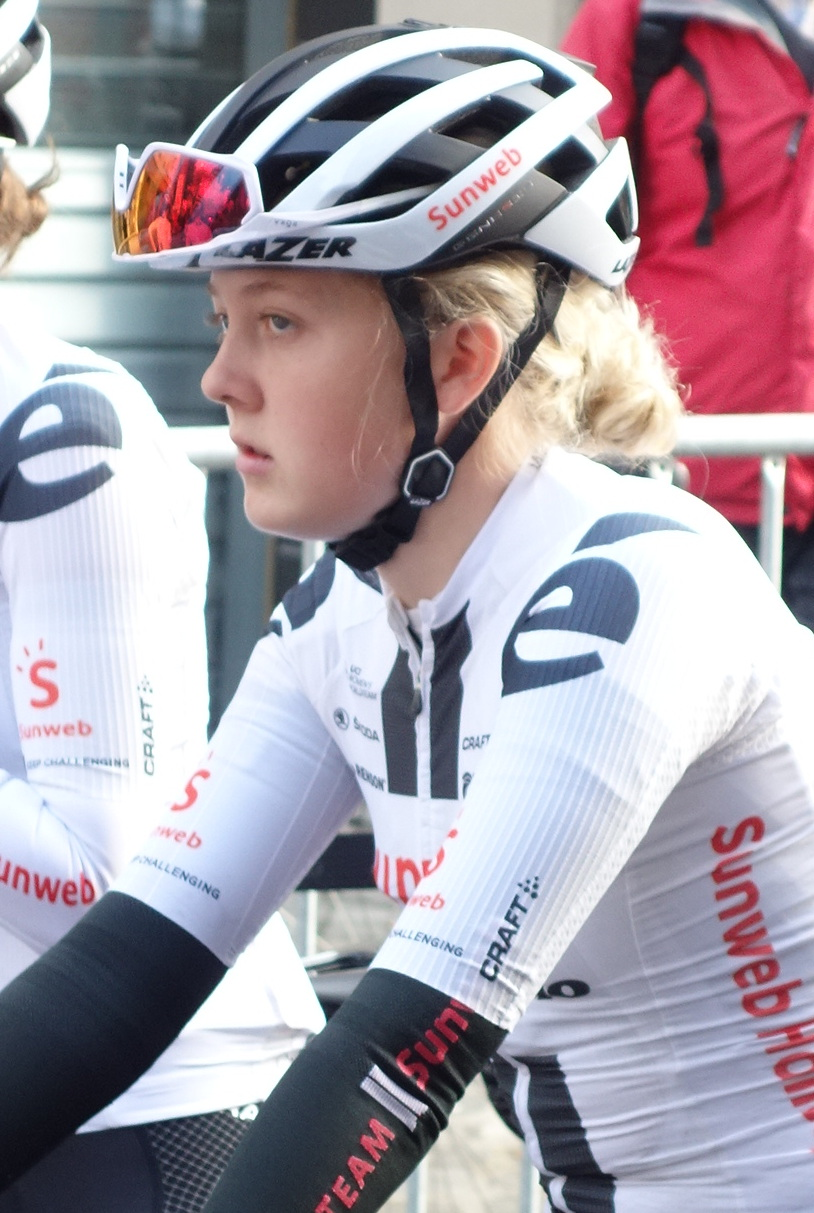
- Olausson in 2020

Personal information
- Born: 9 April 2001 (age 25)

Cycling career
- Sport: Cycling
- Current team: Team Friis ABC ACR
- Discipline: Road
- Role: Rider

Amateur teams
- 2018–2019: Team Rytger
- 2026–: Team Friis ABC ACR

Professional teams
- 2020–2021: Team Sunweb
- 2022–2024: Uno-X Pro Cycling Team

Wilma Olausson (born 9 April 2001) is a Swedish professional racing cyclist, who currently rides for danish Team Friis ABC ACR. In October 2020, she rode in the women's edition of the 2020 Liège–Bastogne–Liège race in Belgium.
