= 2020 Liège–Bastogne–Liège Femmes =

Cycling race

2020 UCI Women's World Tour, race 7 of 11
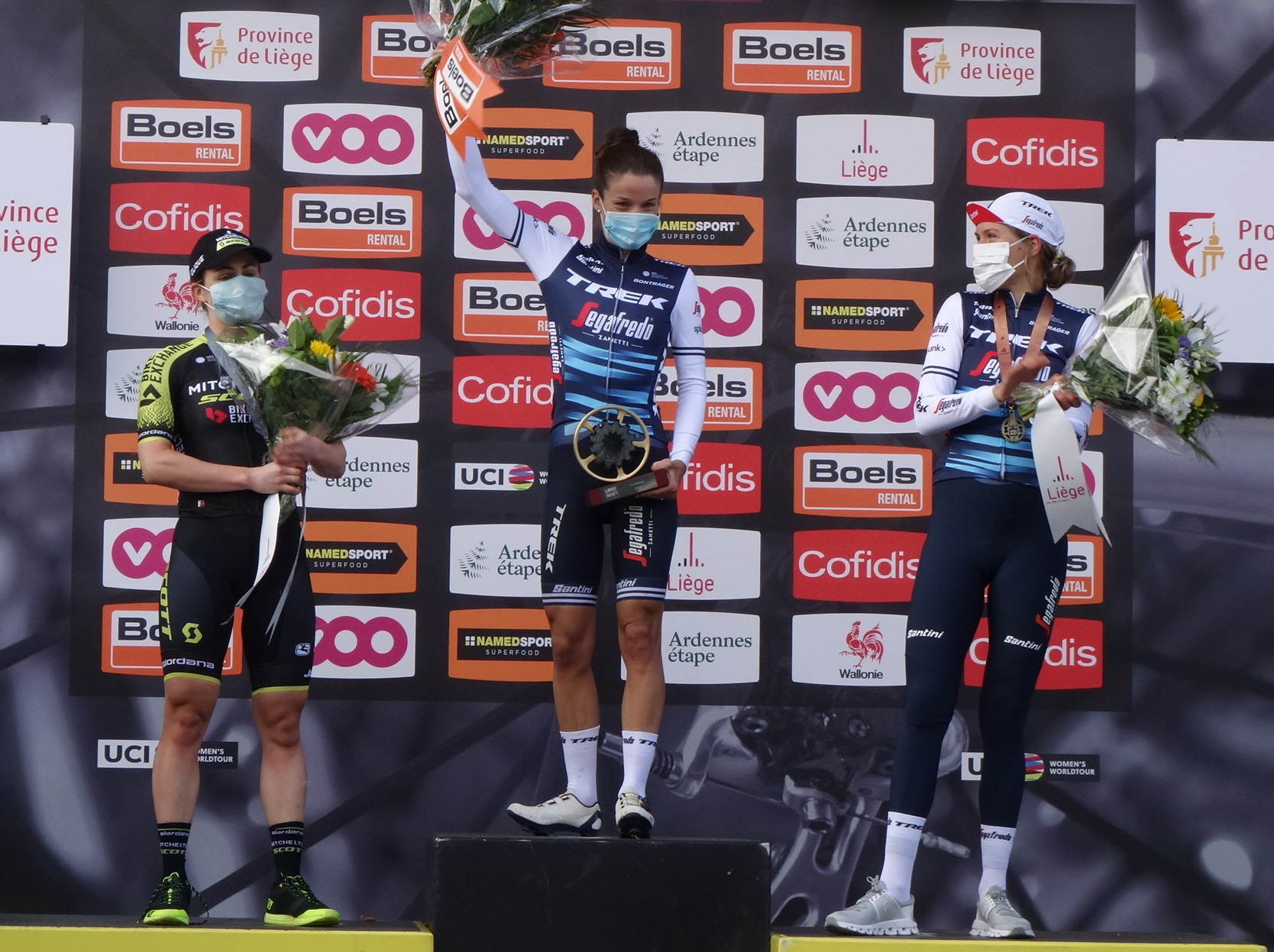

Race details
- Dates: 4 October 2020
- Distance: 135 km (84 mi)
- Winning time: 3h 29' 48"

Results
	Winner	Lizzie Deignan (UK)	(Trek–Segafredo)
	Second	Grace Brown (AUS)	(Mitchelton–Scott)
	Third	Ellen van Dijk (NED)	(Trek–Segafredo)

The fourth edition of Liège–Bastogne–Liège Femmes, a road cycling one-day race in Belgium, was held on 4 October 2020. It was originally planned to be held on 26 April, but was cancelled and rescheduled due to the COVID-19 pandemic. It was the seventh event of the shortened 2020 UCI Women's World Tour. The race started in Bastogne and finished in Liège; the route included five categorised climbs over a total distance of 135 km (84 mi).

== Route ==
Similar to the 2019 edition, the race finished in Liège. At 135 km (84 mi), the race was approximately half the distance of the men's event. It started in Bastogne, from where it headed north to finish in Liège on the same location as the men's race. The route featured five categorised climbs: the Côte de Wanne, Côte de la Haute-Levée, Côte de la Vecquée, Côte de La Redoute, and Côte de la Roche aux faucons.

== Teams ==
Eight UCI Women's WorldTeams and sixteen UCI Women's Continental Teams competed in the race. Six of the twenty-four teams did not enter the maximum of six riders; Astana, Charente-Maritime Women Cycling, Ciclotel, Équipe Paule Ka, and Hitec Products–Birk Sport entered only five, while Chevalmeire Cycling Team entered only four. Of these 137 riders, 56 finished the race.

UCI Women's WorldTeams

- Alé BTC Ljubljana
- Canyon//SRAM
- CCC - Liv
- FDJ Nouvelle-Aquitaine Futuroscope
- Mitchelton–Scott
- Movistar Team
- Team Sunweb
- Trek–Segafredo

UCI Women's Continental Teams

- Arkéa Pro Cycling Team
- Aromitalia–Basso Bikes–Vaiano
- Astana
- Boels–Dolmans
- Ceratizit–WNT Pro Cycling
- Charente-Maritime Women Cycling
- Chevalmeire Cycling Team
- Ciclotel
- Cogeas–Mettler–Look
- Doltcini–Van Eyck–Proximus
- Équipe Paule Ka
- Hitec Products–Birk Sport
- Lotto–Soudal Ladies
- Parkhotel Valkenburg
- Tibco–Silicon Valley Bank
- Valcar–Travel & Service

== Result ==
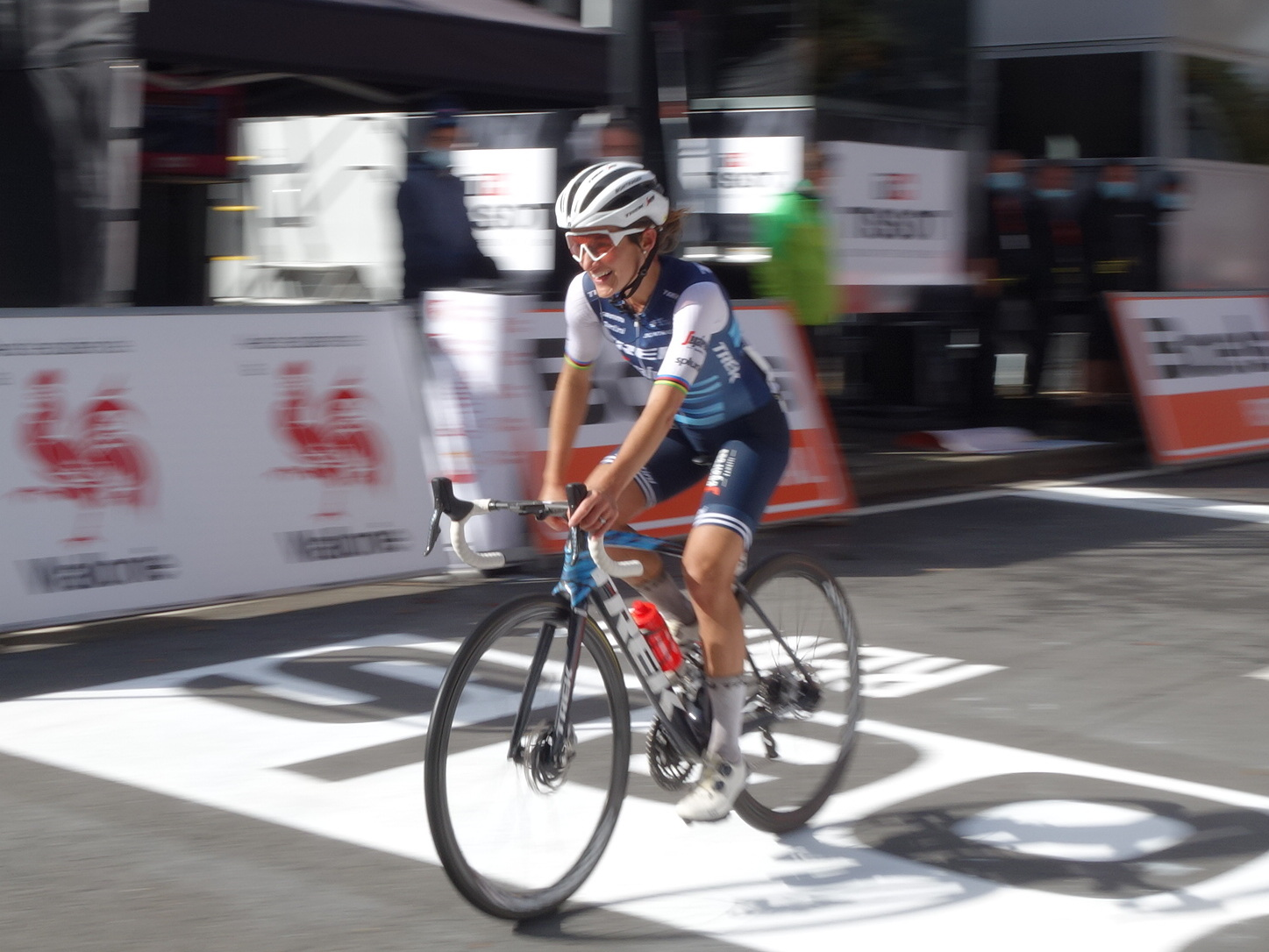
Lizzie Deignan crosses the line solo.

Result
Rank	Rider	Team	Time
1	Lizzie Deignan (GBR)	Trek–Segafredo	3h 29' 48"
2	Grace Brown (AUS)	Mitchelton–Scott	+ 9"
3	Ellen van Dijk (NED)	Trek–Segafredo	+ 2' 19"
4	Marianne Vos (NED)	CCC - Liv	+ 2' 19"
5	Amy Pieters (NED)	Boels–Dolmans	+ 2' 19"
6	Hannah Barnes (GBR)	Canyon//SRAM	+ 2' 21"
7	Marlen Reusser (SUI)	Équipe Paule Ka	+ 2' 21"
8	Juliette Labous (FRA)	Team Sunweb	+ 2' 21"
9	Katrine Aalerud (NOR)	Movistar Team	+ 2' 26"
10	Liane Lippert (GER)	Team Sunweb	+ 3' 27"
