= Sarah Roy =

Australian cyclist (born 1986)

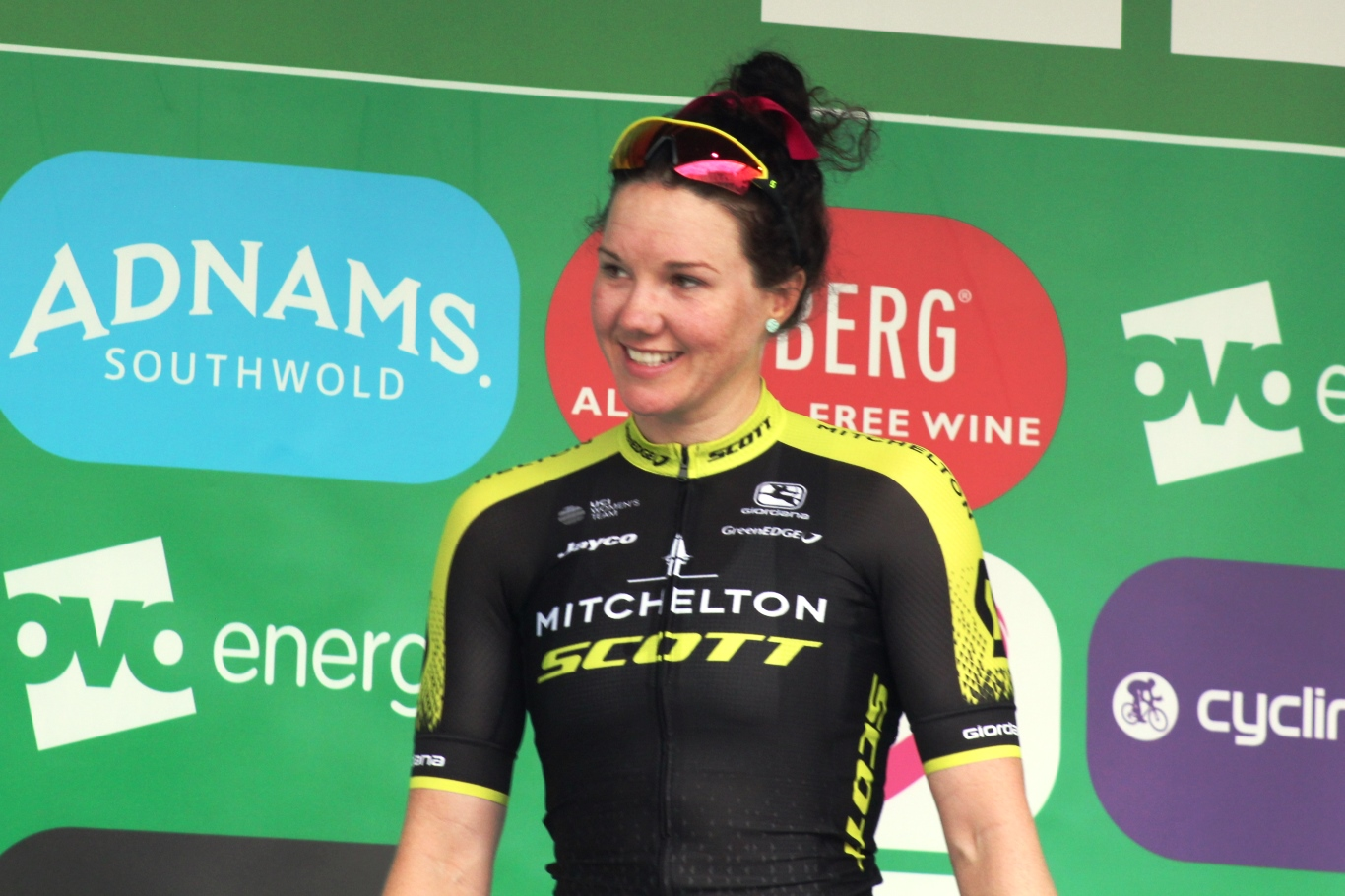
- Roy in 2018

Personal information
- Full name: Sarah Roy
- Born: 27 February 1986 (age 40) Sydney, New South Wales, Australia

Cycling career
- Sport: Cycling
- Discipline: Road
- Role: Rider
- Rider type: Sprinter

Amateur teams
- 2013: Crino Cycles–Casa & Bottega
- 2013–2014: Roxsolt Sydney Uni Velo

Professional teams
- 2013: Team Futurumshop.nl–Polaris (stagiaire)
- 2014: Poitou-Charentes.Futuroscope.86
- 2015–2021: Orica–AIS
- 2022–2023: Canyon//SRAM
- 2024: Cofidis
- 2025: EF Education–Oatly
Medal record
Women's road bicycle racing
Representing Australia
World Championships
Bronze medal – third place	2022 Wollongong	Mixed team relay

Sarah Roy (born 27 February 1986) is a retired Australian professional racing cyclist, who last rode for UCI Women's ProTeam EF Education–Oatly.

Before focussing on racing on the road in 2009, Roy was a triathlete, but injured herself six months later which resulted in knee surgery. After two years off from cycling, Roy made her comeback over two years before her first professional contract at Poitou-Charentes.Futuroscope.86 in 2014.

== Major results ==
2014
1st Criterium, National Road Championships
2016
1st Stage 4 Boels Rental Ladies Tour
2017
1st SwissEver GP Cham-Hagendorn
1st Stage 4 OVO Energy Women's Tour
3rd GP de Plouay – Bretagne
3rd Omloop van het Hageland
2018
1st Gooik–Geraardsbergen–Gooik
1st Stage 3 The Women's Tour
2nd Criterium, National Road Championships
5th Road race, Commonwealth Games
2019
1st Clasica Femenina Navarra
3rd Road race, National Road Championships
2020
4th Gent–Wevelgem
4th Three Days of Bruges–De Panne
5th Tour of Flanders
7th Overall Ceratizit Challenge by La Vuelta
2021
1st Road race, National Road Championships
7th Scheldeprijs
8th Gent–Wevelgem
10th GP Oetingen
2022
3rd Team relay, UCI Road World Championships
8th Overall Bloeizone Fryslân Tour
10th Ronde van Drenthe
