= Ella Harris =

New Zealand cyclist

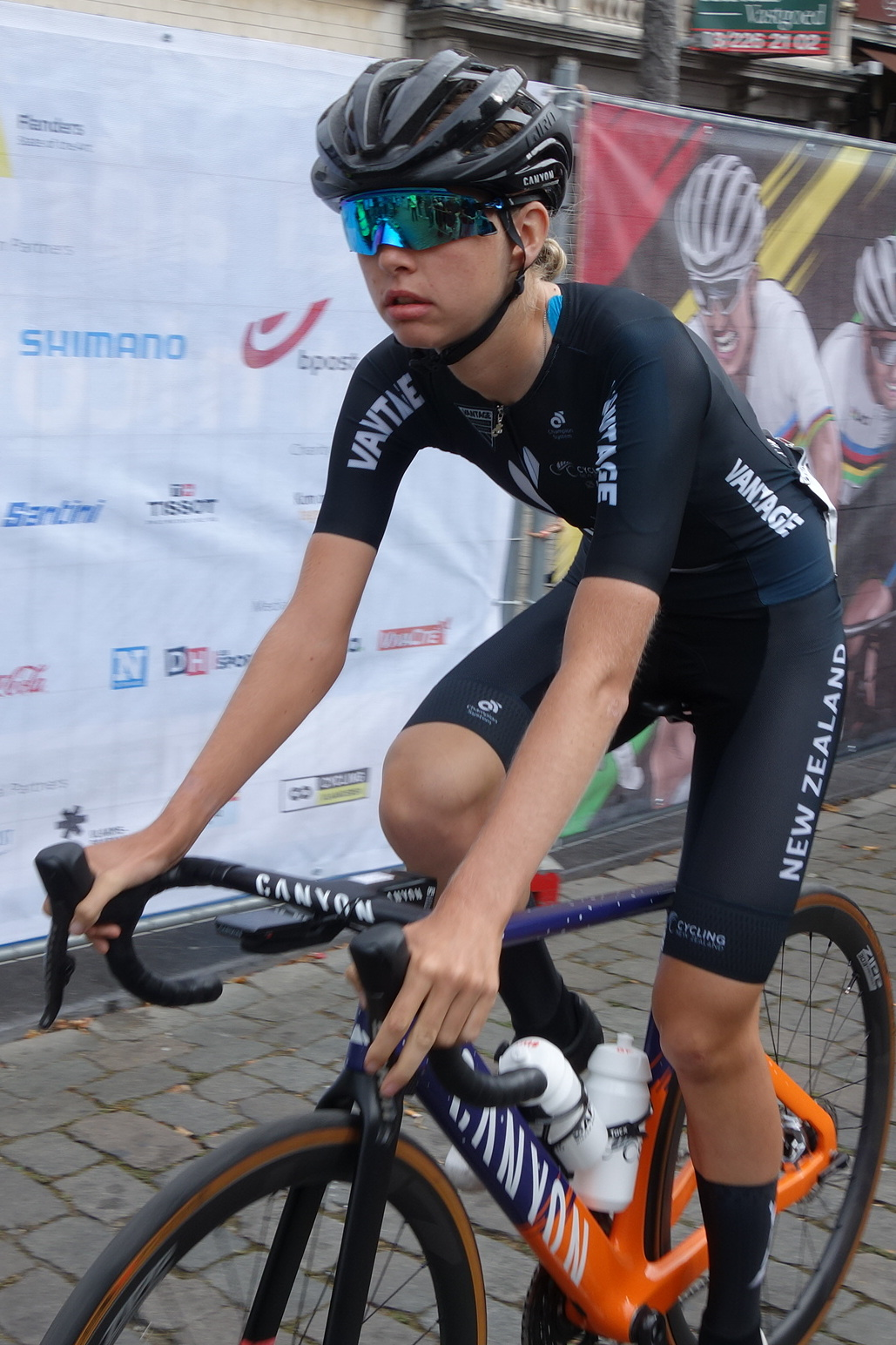
- Harris in 2021

Personal information
- Born: 18 July 1998 (age 28) Cashmere Hills, New Zealand

Cycling career
- Sport: Cycling
- Discipline: Road
- Role: Rider

Amateur team
- 2018: Mike Greer Homes Women's Cycling Team

Professional teams
- 2019–2022: Canyon//SRAM
- 2023-2024: Lifeplus Wahoo

Ella Harris (born 18 July 1998) is a New Zealand former professional racing cyclist. As of 2025, Harris is a marketing communications assistant with Canyon//SRAM.

== Major results ==
2016
7th Time trial, Oceania Junior Road Championships
2019
4th Overall Colorado Classic
7th Gravel and Tar La Femme
8th Overall Vuelta a Burgos Feminas

1st Young rider classification

2020
1st Time trial, National Under-23 Road Championships
2nd New Zealand National Road Race Championships
4th Overall Women's Herald Sun Tour

1st Mountains classification
1st Stage 2

7th Emakumeen Nafarroako Klasikoa
9th Cadel Evans Great Ocean Road Race
