= Ciclotel =

Belgian cycling team

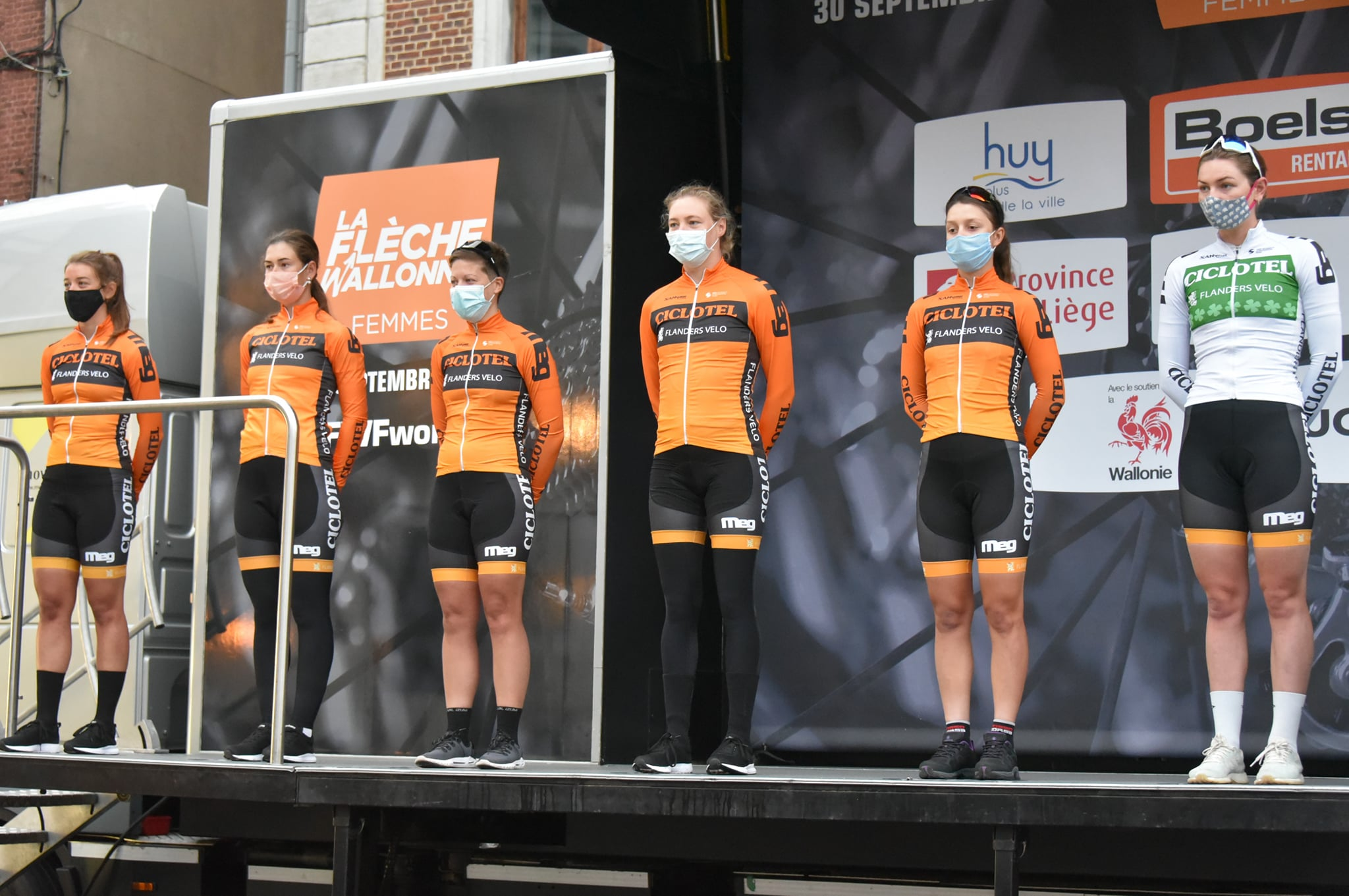

Team information
- UCI code: CTL (2020–)
- Registered: Belgium
- Founded: 2019
- Disbanded: 2020
- Discipline: Road
- Status: UCI Women's Continental Team (2020)

Team name history
- 2020: Ciclotel

Ciclotel was a Belgian women's road bicycle racing team, established in 2019, which participates in elite women's races.

== Team roster ==
As of 16 October 2020.

Rider	Date of birth
Imogen Cotter (IRL)	5 July 1993 (age 33)
Kim de Baat (BEL)	29 May 1991 (age 35)
Stéphanie Duprez (BEL)	25 August 1987 (age 39)
Valeriya Kononenko (UKR)	14 May 1990 (age 36)
Olha Kulynych (UKR)	1 January 2000 (age 26)
Maroesjka Matthee (RSA)	10 January 1989 (age 37)

Rider	Date of birth
Daniela Reis (POR)	6 April 1993 (age 33)
Alice Sharpe (IRL)	3 May 1994 (age 32)
Hayley Simmonds (GBR)	22 July 1988 (age 38)
Sara Van de Vel (BEL)	6 August 1994 (age 32)
Kirstie van Haaften (NED)	21 January 1999 (age 27)
