= 2020 in women's road cycling =

2020 in women's road cycling is about the 2020 women's bicycle races ruled by the UCI and the 2020 UCI Women's Teams.

== Olympic Games ==
The 2020 Olympics, set to be held in Tokyo, Japan, were postponed to 2021 due to the COVID-19 pandemic with the road cycling events taking place from 23 July to 8 August 2021.

== World Championships ==
The World Road Championships were originally set to be held in Aigle and Martigny, Switzerland, from 20 to 27 September 2020. However, due to the COVID-19 pandemic in Switzerland the races in Switzerland were cancelled. The UCI are intending to run the World Championships on the original dates at a new to be confirmed locations. The final location of the World Road Championships is Imola in Italy.

Events at the 2020 UCI Road World Championships
| Race | Date | Winner | Second | Third | Ref |
|---|---|---|---|---|---|
| World Championship Time Trial (elite) | September 24 | Anna van der Breggen (NED) | Marlen Reusser (SWI) | Ellen van Dijk (NED) | |
| World Championship Road Race (elite) | September 26 | Anna van der Breggen (NED) | Annemiek van Vleuten (NED) | Elisa Longo Borghini (ITA) | |

== Single day races (1.Pro, 1.1 and 1.2) ==
| Race | Date | Cat. † | Winner | Second | Third |
|---|---|---|---|---|---|
| (New Zealand) Gravel and Tar | January 25 | 1.2 | Niamh Fisher-Black (NZL) | Samara Sheppard (NZL) | Ella Bloor (AUS) |
| (Turkey) GP Belek | January 25 | 1.2 | Olha Kulynych (UKR) | Olena Sharga (UKR) | Viktoriia Melnychuk (UKR) |
| (Australia) Race Torquay | January 30 | 1.1 | Brodie Chapman (AUS) | Emily Herfoss (AUS) | Tayler Wiles (USA) |
| (Spain) Vuelta a la Comunitat Valenciana Feminas | February 9 | 1.1 | Marta Bastianelli (ITA) | Barbara Guarischi (ITA) | Teniel Campbell (TTO) |
| (Turkey) Grand Prix Alanya | February 13 | 1.2 | Diana Klimova (RUS) | Hanna Tserakh (BLR) | Anna Nahirna (UKR) |
| (Turkey) Grand Prix Gazipaşa | February 14 | 1.2 | Olga Shekel (UKR) | Polina Kirillova (RUS) | Galina Chernyshova (RUS) |
| (Belgium) Omloop Het Nieuwsblad | February | 1.1 | Annemiek van Vleuten (NED) | Marta Bastianelli (ITA) | Floortje Mackaij (NED) |
| (Turkey) Grand Prix Velo Alanya | February | 1.2 | Daria Malkova (RUS) | Mariia Miliaeva (RUS) | Margarita Syradoeva (RUS) |
| (Belgium) Omloop van het Hageland | March 1 | 1.1 | Lorena Wiebes (NED) | Marta Bastianelli (ITA) | Emma Cecilie Norsgaard (DEN) |
| (Turkey) Grand Prix Manavgat | March 1 | 1.2 | Hanna Tserakh (BLR) | Iulia Galimullina (RUS) | Margarita Syradoeva (RUS) |
| (Belgium) Le Samyn des Dames | March 3 | 1.2 | Chantal van den Broek-Blaak (NED) | Christine Majerus (LUX) | Lotte Kopecky (BEL) |
| (Spain) Emakumeen Nafarroako Klasikoa | July 23 | 1.1 | Annemiek van Vleuten (NED) | Mavi García (ESP) | Anna van der Breggen (NED) |
| (Spain) Clasica Femenina Navarra | July 24 | 1.1 | Annemiek van Vleuten (NED) | Elisa Longo Borghini (ITA) | Maria Giulia Confalonieri (ITA) |
| (Spain) Durango-Durango Emakumeen Saria | July 26 | 1.1 | Annemiek van Vleuten (NED) | Anna van der Breggen (NED) | Elisa Longo Borghini (ITA) |
| (France) La Périgord Ladies | August 15 | 1.2 | Sheyla Gutiérrez (ESP) | Sandra Levenez (FRA) | Tanja Erath (GER) |
| (Italy) Giro dell'Emilia Internazionale Donne Elite | August 18 | 1.Pro | Cecilie Uttrup Ludwig (DEN) | Rasa Leleivytė (LTU) | Pauliena Rooijakkers (NED) |
| (Belgium) Grote Prijs Euromat | August 31 | 1.2 | Lorena Wiebes (NED) | Charlotte Kool (NED) | Susanne Andersen (NOR) |
| (Turkey) Grand Prix Develi | September 3 | 1.2 | Laura Milena Toconás (COL) | Anastasia Chursina (RUS) | Aigul Gareeva (RUS) |
| (Turkey) Grand Prix Cappadocia | September 4 | 1.2 | Valeriya Kononenko (UKR) | Olha Kulynych (UKR) | Aigul Gareeva (RUS) |
| (Turkey) Grand Prix Mount Erciyes 2200 mt | September 5 | 1.2 | Maria Novolodskaya (RUS) | Valeriya Kononenko (UKR) | Aigul Gareeva (RUS) |
| (Turkey) Grand Prix World's Best High Altitude | September 6 | 1.2 | Maria Novolodskaya (RUS) | Anastasia Chursina (RUS) | Carolina Upegui (COL) |
| (Turkey) Grand Prix Velo Erciyes | September 14 | 1.2 | Valeriya Kononenko (UKR) | Iuliia Galimullina (RUS) | Anastasia Pecherskikh (RUS) |
| (Turkey) Grand Prix Central Anatolia | September 15 | 1.2 | Tamara Balabolina (RUS) | Valeriya Kononenko (UKR) | Elizaveta Oshurkova (RUS) |
| (Belgium) Trophée des Grimpeuses | September 19 | 1.2 | Inge van der Heijden (NED) | Yara Kastelijn (NED) | Kristabel Doebel-Hickok (USA) |
| (France) Grand Prix d'Isbergues | September 20 | 1.2 | Chloe Hosking (AUS) | Chiara Consonni (ITA) | Lauren Kitchen (AUS) |
| (Belgium) Brabantse Pijl Dames Gooik | October 7 | 1.1 | Grace Brown (AUS) | Liane Lippert (GER) | Floortje Mackaij (NED) |
| (Panama) Elite Road Central American Championships | November 21 | 1.2 | Maria José Silva (NCA) | Jasmin Soto (GUA) | Annibel Emilia Prieto (PAN) |
| (Panama) Elite Road Central American Championships | November 22 | 1.2 | Milagro Mena (CRC) | María José Vargas (CRC) | Sharon Ramírez Moya (CRC) |

== Stage races (2.Pro, 2.1 and 2.2) ==
| Race | Date | Cat. | Winner | Second | Third |
|---|---|---|---|---|---|
| (Australia) Santos Women's Tour | 16-19 Jan | 2.Pro | Ruth Winder (USA) | Liane Lippert (GER) | Amanda Spratt (AUS) |
| (Australia) Women's Herald Sun Tour | 5–6 Feb | 2.1 | Lucy Kennedy (AUS) | Jaime Gunning (AUS) | Arlenis Sierra (CUB) |
| (United Arab Emirates) Dubai Women's Tour | 17–20 Feb | 2.2 | Lucy van der Haar (GBR) | Tatsiana Sharakova (BLR) | Samah Khaled (JOR) |
| (Spain) Setmana Ciclista Valenciana | 20-23 Feb | 2.2 | Anna van der Breggen (NED) | Clara Koppenburg (GER) | Demi Vollering (NED) |
| (France) Tour Cycliste Féminin International de l'Ardèche | September 3–9 | 2.1 | Lauren Stephens (USA) | Mavi García (ESP) | Anna Kiesenhofer (AUT) |
| (Thailand) The Princess Maha Chackri Sirindhon's Cup | October 14–16 | 2.1 | Jutatip Maneephan (THA) | Supaksorn Nuntana (THA) | Chaniporn Batriya (THA) |
| Vuelta a Colombia Femenina | November 7–11 | 2.2 | Miryan Nuñez (ECU) | Lorena Colmenares (COL) | Lina Hernández (COL) |

== Junior races ==
| Race | Date | Cat. † | Winner | Second | Third |
|---|---|---|---|---|---|
| (Turkey) Velo Alanya Junior | January 15–January 16 | 2.1WJ | Kristina Ivanova (RUS) | Ulyana Sukhorebrik (KAZ) | Arina Muraveva (RUS) |
| (Turkey) Manavgat Side Junior | January 27–January 28 | 2.1WJ | Elena Boikova (RUS) | Sofia Balaeva (RUS) | Arina Muraveva (RUS) |
| (Spain) Bizkaikoloreak | September 12–September 13 | 2.NcupWJ | Inés Cantera (ESP) | Idoia Eraso (ESP) | Marina Garau (ESP) |

== Continental Championships ==
| Championships | Race | Winner | Second | Third |
|---|---|---|---|---|
| European Road Championships; France August 24–26 (2020 summary) | Road race | Annemiek van Vleuten (NED) | Elisa Longo Borghini (ITA) | Katarzyna Niewiadoma (POL) |
| European Road Championships; France August 24–26 (2020 summary) | Individual time trial | Anna van der Breggen (NED) | Ellen van Dijk (NED) | Marlen Reusser (SUI) |
| European Road Championships; France August 24–26 (2020 summary) | Road race (U23) | Elisa Balsamo (ITA) | Lonneke Uneken (NED) | Emma Cecilie Norsgaard (DEN) |
| European Road Championships; France August 24–26 (2020 summary) | Individual time trial (U23) | Hannah Ludwig (GER) | Franziska Koch (GER) | Marta Jaskulska (POL) |
| European Road Championships; France August 24–26 (2020 summary) | Road race (Junior) | Eleonora Camilla Gasparrini (ITA) | Marith Vanhove (BEL) | Katrijn de Clercq (BEL) |
| European Road Championships; France August 24–26 (2020 summary) | Individual time trial (Junior) | Elise Uijen (NED) | Maeva Squiban (FRA) | Carlotta Cipressi (ITA) |
| European Road Championships; France August 24–26 (2020 summary) | Mixed Road Race | Germany (GER); Lisa Brennauer; Mieke Kröger; Lisa Klein; Miguel Heidemann; Justin Wolf; Michel Hessmann | Switzerland (SUI); Kathrin Stirnemann; Marlen Reusser; Elise Chabbey; Claudio Imhof; Stefan Bissegger; Robin Froidevaux | Italy (ITA); Vittoria Bussi; Elena Cecchini; Vittoria Guazzini; Liam Bertazzo; Edoardo Affini; Davide Plebani |

== Teams ==
UCI Women's WorldTeams
Alé BTC Ljubljana
Canyon//SRAM
CCC - Liv
FDJ Nouvelle-Aquitaine Futuroscope
Mitchelton–Scott
Movistar Team
Team Sunweb
Trek–Segafredo
UCI Women's Continental Teams
Agolíco–BMC–PatoBike
Arkéa Pro Cycling Team
Aromitalia–Basso Bikes–Vaiano
Astana
Bepink
Biehler Krush Pro Cycling
Bigla–Katusha
Bizkaia–Durango
Boels–Dolmans
CAMS–Tifosi
Ceratizit–WNT Pro Cycling
Charente-Maritime Women Cycling
Chevalmeire Cycling Team
Ciclotel
Cogeas–Mettler–Look
Cronos–Casa Dorada
DNA Pro Cycling
Doltcini–Van Eyck–Proximus
Drops
Eneicat–RBH Global
Eurotarget–Bianchi–Vittoria
Hitec Products–Birk Sport
InstaFund La Prima
Lotto–Soudal Ladies
Lviv Cycling Team
Macogep Tornatech Girondins de Bordeaux
Massi–Tactic
Minsk Cycling Club
Multum Accountants–LSK Ladies
NXTG Racing
Parkhotel Valkenburg
Pro Cycling Team Fanini
Rally Cycling
Río Miera–Cantabria Deporte
Roxsolt Attaquer
Servetto–Piumate–Beltrami TSA
Sestroretsk
Sopela Women's Team
Team Illuminate
Tibco–Silicon Valley Bank
Thailand Women's Cycling Team
Top Girls Fassa Bortolo
Valcar–Travel & Service
VIB–Natural Greatness
WCC Team

== Deaths ==
- April 29 - Eva Mottet, 25, French road cyclist.
