= 2024 in women's road cycling =

2024 in women's road cycling is about the 2024 women's bicycle races ruled by the UCI and the 2024 UCI Women's Teams.

== World Championships ==
Race	Date	Cat. †	Winner	Second	Third	Ref
(Switzerland) UCI Road World Championships ITT	22 September 2024	WC	Grace Brown (AUS)	Demi Vollering (NED)	Chloé Dygert (USA)	
(Switzerland) UCI Road World Championships ITT Junior	24 September 2023	WC	Cat Ferguson (GBR)	Viktória Chladoňová (SVK)	Imogen Wolff (GBR)	
(Switzerland) UCI Road World Championships RR	28 September 2024	WC	Lotte Kopecky (BEL)	Chloé Dygert (USA)	Elisa Longo Borghini (ITA)	
(Switzerland) UCI Road World Championships RR U23	28 September 2024	WC	Puck Pieterse (NED)	Neve Bradbury (AUS)	Antonia Niedermaier (GER)	
(Switzerland) UCI Road World Championships RR Junior	26 September 2024	WC	Cat Ferguson (GBR)	Paula Ostiz (ESP)	Viktória Chladoňová (SVK)	
(Switzerland) UCI Road World Championships TTT	25 September 2024	WC	Australia (AUS); Grace Brown; Brodie Chapman; Ben O'Connor; Ruby Roseman-Gannon; Jay Vine; Michael Matthews	Germany (GER); Marco Brenner; Miguel Heidemann; Franziska Koch; Liane Lippert; Antonia Niedermaier; Max Schachmann	Italy (ITA); Edoardo Affini; Mattia Cattaneo; Filippo Ganna; Elisa Longo Borghini; Soraya Paladin; Gaia Realini	

== UCI Women's WorldTour ==
Date	Race	Podium		Podium	Podium
12–14 January 2024	(Australia); 2024 Women's Tour Down Under	1	(New Zealand) Ally Wollaston; AG Insurance–Soudal	(Australia) Georgia Baker; Liv AlUla Jayco	(Italy) Sofia Bertizzolo; UAE Team ADQ
12–14 January 2024	(Australia); 2024 Women's Tour Down Under	2	(Denmark) Cecilie Uttrup Ludwig; FDJ–Suez	(Italy) Soraya Paladin; Canyon//SRAM	(Italy) Sofia Bertizzolo; UAE Team ADQ
12–14 January 2024	(Australia); 2024 Women's Tour Down Under	3	(Australia) Sarah Gigante; AG Insurance–Soudal	(Netherlands) Nienke Vinke; Team dsm–firmenich PostNL	(Australia) Neve Bradbury; Canyon//SRAM
12–14 January 2024	(Australia); 2024 Women's Tour Down Under	Overall	(Australia) Sarah Gigante; AG Insurance–Soudal; Winner	(Netherlands) Nienke Vinke; Team dsm–firmenich PostNL; 2nd place	(Australia) Neve Bradbury; Canyon//SRAM; 3rd place
27 January 2024	(Australia); 2024 Cadel Evans Great Ocean Road Race	1	(Netherlands) Rosita Reijnhout; Visma–Lease a Bike	(Poland) Dominika Włodarczyk; UAE Team ADQ	(Denmark) Cecilie Uttrup Ludwig; FDJ–Suez
8–11 February 2024	(United Arab Emirates); 2024 UAE Tour Women	1	(Netherlands) Lorena Wiebes; Team SD Worx–Protime	(Italy) Rachele Barbieri; Team dsm–firmenich PostNL	(Italy) Chiara Consonni; UAE Team ADQ
8–11 February 2024	(United Arab Emirates); 2024 UAE Tour Women	2	(Netherlands) Lorena Wiebes; Team SD Worx–Protime	(Italy) Chiara Consonni; UAE Team ADQ	(France) Clara Copponi; Lidl–Trek
8–11 February 2024	(United Arab Emirates); 2024 UAE Tour Women	3	(Belgium) Lotte Kopecky; Team SD Worx–Protime	(Australia) Neve Bradbury; Canyon//SRAM	(Spain) Mavi García; Liv AlUla Jayco
8–11 February 2024	(United Arab Emirates); 2024 UAE Tour Women	4	(Netherlands) Amber Kraak FDJ–Suez	(Netherlands) Lorena Wiebes Team SD Worx–Protime	(Poland) Daria Pikulik Human Powered Health
8–11 February 2024	(United Arab Emirates); 2024 UAE Tour Women	Overall	(Belgium) Lotte Kopecky; Team SD Worx–Protime; Winner	(Australia) Neve Bradbury; Canyon//SRAM; 2nd place	(Spain) Mavi García; Liv AlUla Jayco; 3rd place
24 February 2024	(Belgium); 2024 Omloop Het Nieuwsblad Women Elite	1	(Netherlands) Marianne Vos; Visma–Lease a Bike; Winner	(Belgium) Lotte Kopecky; Team SD Worx–Protime; 2nd place	(Italy) Elisa Longo Borghini; Lidl–Trek; 3rd place
2 March 2024	(Italy); 2024 Strade Bianche Donne	1	(Belgium) Lotte Kopecky; Team SD Worx–Protime; Winner	(Italy) Elisa Longo Borghini; Lidl–Trek; 2nd place	(Netherlands) Demi Vollering; Team SD Worx–Protime; 3rd place
10 March 2024	(Netherlands); 2024 Ronde van Drenthe Women Elite	1	(Netherlands) Lorena Wiebes; Team SD Worx–Protime; Winner	(Italy) Elisa Balsamo; Lidl–Trek; 2nd place	(Netherlands) Puck Pieterse; Fenix–Deceuninck
17 March 2024	(Italy); 2024 Trofeo Alfredo Binda-Comune di Cittiglio	1	(Italy) Elisa Balsamo; Lidl–Trek; Winner	(Belgium) Lotte Kopecky; Team SD Worx–Protime; 2nd place	(Netherlands) Puck Pieterse; Fenix–Deceuninck; 3rd place
21 March 2024	(Belgium); 2024 Classic Brugge–De Panne	1	(Italy) Elisa Balsamo; Lidl–Trek; Winner	(Netherlands) Charlotte Kool; Team dsm–firmenich PostNL; 2nd place	(Poland) Daria Pikulik; Human Powered Health; 3rd place
24 March 2024	(Belgium); 2024 Gent–Wevelgem	1	(Netherlands) Lorena Wiebes; Team SD Worx–Protime; Winner	(Italy) Elisa Balsamo; Lidl–Trek; 2nd place	(Italy) Chiara Consonni; UAE Team ADQ; 3rd place
31 March 2024	(Belgium); 2024 Tour of Flanders	1	(Italy) Elisa Longo Borghini; Lidl–Trek; Winner	(Poland) Katarzyna Niewiadoma; Canyon//SRAM; 2nd place	(Netherlands) Shirin van Anrooij; Lidl–Trek; 3rd place
6 April 2024	(France); 2024 Paris-Roubaix Femmes	1	(Belgium) Lotte Kopecky; Team SD Worx–Protime; Winner	(Italy) Elisa Balsamo; Lidl–Trek; 2nd place	(United Kingdom) Pfeiffer Georgi; Team dsm–firmenich PostNL; 3rd place
14 April 2024	(Netherlands); 2024 Amstel Gold Race Ladies Edition	1	(Netherlands) Marianne Vos; Visma–Lease a Bike; Winner	(Netherlands) Lorena Wiebes; Team SD Worx–Protime; 2nd place	(Norway) Ingvild Gåskjenn; Liv AlUla Jayco; 3rd place
17 April 2024	(Belgium); 2024 La Flèche Wallonne Féminine	1	(Poland) Katarzyna Niewiadoma; Canyon//SRAM; Winner	(Netherlands) Demi Vollering; Team SD Worx–Protime; 2nd place	(Italy) Elisa Longo Borghini; Lidl–Trek; 3rd place
21 April 2024	(Belgium); 2024 Liège–Bastogne–Liège Femmes	1	(Australia) Grace Brown; FDJ–Suez; Winner	(Italy) Elisa Longo Borghini; Lidl–Trek; 2nd place	(Netherlands) Lorena Wiebes; Team SD Worx–Protime; 3rd place
28 April – 2024	(Spain); 2024 La Vuelta Femenina	1	(United States) Lidl–Trek; Gaia Realini; Elisa Longo Borghini; Elynor Bäckstedt; Brodie Chapman; Lizzie Deignan; Amanda Spratt; Ellen van Dijk	(Netherlands) Visma–Lease a Bike; Riejanne Markus; Marianne Vos; Sophie von Berswordt; Anna Henderson; Eva van Agt; Maud Oudeman; Carlijn Achtereekte	(Netherlands) Team SD Worx–Protime; Demi Vollering; Mischa Bredewold; Niamh Fisher-Black; Blanka Vas; Marlen Reusser; Elena Cecchini; Barbara Guarischi
28 April – 2024	(Spain); 2024 La Vuelta Femenina	2	(Canada) Alison Jackson; EF Education–EasyPost	(Hungary) Blanka Vas; Team SD Worx–Protime	(Netherlands) Karlijn Swinkels; UAE Team ADQ
28 April – 2024	(Spain); 2024 La Vuelta Femenina	3	(Netherlands) Marianne Vos; Visma–Lease a Bike	(Netherlands) Charlotte Kool; Team dsm–firmenich PostNL	(Canada) Olivia Baril; Movistar Team
28 April – 2024	(Spain); 2024 La Vuelta Femenina	4	(United States) Kristen Faulkner; EF Education–EasyPost	(Australia) Georgia Baker; Liv AlUla Jayco	(Netherlands) Marianne Vos; Visma–Lease a Bike
28 April – 2024	(Spain); 2024 La Vuelta Femenina	5	(Netherlands) Demi Vollering; Team SD Worx–Protime	(Netherlands) Yara Kastelijn; Fenix–Deceuninck	(Italy) Elisa Longo Borghini; Lidl–Trek
28 April – 2024	(Spain); 2024 La Vuelta Femenina	6	(France) Évita Muzic; FDJ–Suez	(Netherlands) Demi Vollering; Team SD Worx–Protime	(Netherlands) Yara Kastelijn; Fenix–Deceuninck
28 April – 2024	(Spain); 2024 La Vuelta Femenina	7	(Netherlands) Marianne Vos; Visma–Lease a Bike	(United States) Kristen Faulkner; EF Education–EasyPost	(Italy) Elisa Longo Borghini; Lidl–Trek
28 April – 2024	(Spain); 2024 La Vuelta Femenina	8	(Netherlands) Demi Vollering; Team SD Worx–Protime	(France) Évita Muzic; FDJ–Suez	(Netherlands) Riejanne Markus; Visma–Lease a Bike
28 April – 2024	(Spain); 2024 La Vuelta Femenina	Overall	(Netherlands) Demi Vollering; Team SD Worx–Protime; Winner	(Netherlands) Riejanne Markus; Visma–Lease a Bike; 2nd place	(Italy) Elisa Longo Borghini; Lidl–Trek; 3rd place
10–12 May 2024	(Spain); 2024 Itzulia Women	1	(Netherlands) Mischa Bredewold; Team SD Worx–Protime	(Cuba) Arlenis Sierra; Movistar Team	(Netherlands) Demi Vollering; Team SD Worx–Protime
10–12 May 2024	(Spain); 2024 Itzulia Women	2	(Netherlands) Mischa Bredewold; Team SD Worx–Protime	(Spain) Mavi García; Liv AlUla Jayco	(France) Juliette Labous; Team dsm–firmenich PostNL
10–12 May 2024	(Spain); 2024 Itzulia Women	3	(Netherlands) Demi Vollering; Team SD Worx–Protime	(Netherlands) Thalita de Jong; Lotto–Dstny Ladies	(Netherlands) Mischa Bredewold; Team SD Worx–Protime
10–12 May 2024	(Spain); 2024 Itzulia Women	Overall	(Netherlands) Demi Vollering; Team SD Worx–Protime; Winner	(Netherlands) Mischa Bredewold; Team SD Worx–Protime; 2nd place	(France) Juliette Labous; Team dsm–firmenich PostNL; 3rd place
16–18 May 2024	(Spain); 2024 Vuelta a Burgos Feminas	1	(Finland) Lotta Henttala; EF Education–EasyPost	(Austria) Carina Schrempf; Fenix–Deceuninck	(Netherlands) Lorena Wiebes; Team SD Worx–Protime
16–18 May 2024	(Spain); 2024 Vuelta a Burgos Feminas	2	(Netherlands) Demi Vollering; Team SD Worx–Protime	(France) Évita Muzic; FDJ–Suez	(Netherlands) Karlijn Swinkels; UAE Team ADQ
16–18 May 2024	(Spain); 2024 Vuelta a Burgos Feminas	3	(Netherlands) Lorena Wiebes; Team SD Worx–Protime	(France) Clara Copponi; Lidl–Trek	(Netherlands) Maike van der Duin; Canyon//SRAM
16–18 May 2024	(Spain); 2024 Vuelta a Burgos Feminas	4	(Netherlands) Demi Vollering; Team SD Worx–Protime	(Netherlands) Lucinda Brand; Lidl–Trek	(France) Évita Muzic; FDJ–Suez
16–18 May 2024	(Spain); 2024 Vuelta a Burgos Feminas	Overall	(Netherlands) Demi Vollering; Team SD Worx–Protime; Winner	(France) Évita Muzic; FDJ–Suez; 2nd place	(Netherlands) Karlijn Swinkels; UAE Team ADQ; 3rd place
24–26 May 2024	(United Kingdom); 2024 RideLondon-Classique	1	(Netherlands) Lorena Wiebes; Team SD Worx–Protime	(Italy) Letizia Paternoster; Liv AlUla Jayco	(France) Clara Copponi; Lidl–Trek
24–26 May 2024	(United Kingdom); 2024 RideLondon-Classique	2	(Netherlands) Lorena Wiebes; Team SD Worx–Protime	(Netherlands) Charlotte Kool; Team dsm–firmenich PostNL	(Belgium) Lotte Kopecky; Team SD Worx–Protime
24–26 May 2024	(United Kingdom); 2024 RideLondon-Classique	3	(Netherlands) Lorena Wiebes; Team SD Worx–Protime	(Netherlands) Charlotte Kool; Team dsm–firmenich PostNL	(Belgium) Lotte Kopecky; Team SD Worx–Protime
24–26 May 2024	(United Kingdom); 2024 RideLondon-Classique	Overall	(Netherlands) Lorena Wiebes; Team SD Worx–Protime; Winner	(Netherlands) Charlotte Kool; Team dsm–firmenich PostNL; 2nd place	(Belgium) Lotte Kopecky; Team SD Worx–Protime; 3rd place
6–9 June 2024	(United Kingdom); 2024 Tour of Britain Women	1	(Belgium) Lotte Kopecky; Team SD Worx–Protime	(Italy) Letizia Paternoster; Liv AlUla Jayco	(United Kingdom) Pfeiffer Georgi; Team dsm–firmenich PostNL
6–9 June 2024	(United Kingdom); 2024 Tour of Britain Women	2	(Belgium) Lotte Kopecky; Team SD Worx–Protime	(United Kingdom) Anna Henderson; Great Britain (national team)	(Netherlands) Lorena Wiebes; Team SD Worx–Protime
6–9 June 2024	(United Kingdom); 2024 Tour of Britain Women	3	(Netherlands) Lorena Wiebes; Team SD Worx–Protime	(Netherlands) Charlotte Kool; Team dsm–firmenich PostNL	(Australia) Georgia Baker; Liv AlUla Jayco
6–9 June 2024	(United Kingdom); 2024 Tour of Britain Women	4	(Australia) Ruby Roseman-Gannon; Liv AlUla Jayco	(Luxembourg) Christine Majerus; Team SD Worx–Protime	(Netherlands) Lorena Wiebes; Team SD Worx–Protime
6–9 June 2024	(United Kingdom); 2024 Tour of Britain Women	Overall	(Belgium) Lotte Kopecky; Team SD Worx–Protime; Winner	(United Kingdom) Anna Henderson; Great Britain (national team); 2nd place	(Luxembourg) Christine Majerus; Team SD Worx–Protime; 3rd place
15–18 June 2024	(Switzerland); 2024 Tour de Suisse Women	1	(Netherlands) Demi Vollering; Team SD Worx–Protime	(Italy) Gaia Realini; Lidl–Trek	(Switzerland) Elise Chabbey; Canyon//SRAM
15–18 June 2024	(Switzerland); 2024 Tour de Suisse Women	2	(Netherlands) Demi Vollering; Team SD Worx–Protime	(Italy) Elisa Longo Borghini; Lidl–Trek	(New Zealand) Kim Cadzow; EF Education–EasyPost
15–18 June 2024	(Switzerland); 2024 Tour de Suisse Women	3	(Australia) Neve Bradbury; Canyon//SRAM	(Poland) Katarzyna Niewiadoma; Canyon//SRAM	(Netherlands) Femke de Vries; Visma–Lease a Bike
15–18 June 2024	(Switzerland); 2024 Tour de Suisse Women	4	(Netherlands) Demi Vollering; Team SD Worx–Protime	(Italy) Elisa Longo Borghini; Lidl–Trek	(Australia) Neve Bradbury; Canyon//SRAM
15–18 June 2024	(Switzerland); 2024 Tour de Suisse Women	Overall	(Netherlands) Demi Vollering; Team SD Worx–Protime; Winner	(Australia) Neve Bradbury; Canyon//SRAM; 2nd place	(Italy) Elisa Longo Borghini; Lidl–Trek; 3rd place
7–14 July 2024	(Italy); 2024 Giro d'Italia Women	1	(Italy) Elisa Longo Borghini; Lidl–Trek	(Australia) Grace Brown; FDJ–Suez	(Australia) Brodie Chapman; Lidl–Trek
7–14 July 2024	(Italy); 2024 Giro d'Italia Women	2	(Italy) Chiara Consonni; UAE Team ADQ	(Belgium) Lotte Kopecky; Team SD Worx–Protime	(Italy) Elisa Balsamo; Lidl–Trek
7–14 July 2024	(Italy); 2024 Giro d'Italia Women	3	(New Zealand) Niamh Fisher-Black; Team SD Worx–Protime	(Belgium) Lotte Kopecky; Team SD Worx–Protime	(France) Juliette Labous; Team dsm–firmenich PostNL
7–14 July 2024	(Italy); 2024 Giro d'Italia Women	4	(Canada) Clara Emond; EF Education–EasyPost	(Italy) Soraya Paladin; Canyon//SRAM	(Denmark) Cecilie Uttrup Ludwig; FDJ–Suez
7–14 July 2024	(Italy); 2024 Giro d'Italia Women	5	(Belgium) Lotte Kopecky; Team SD Worx–Protime	(Italy) Chiara Consonni; UAE Team ADQ	(Cuba) Arlenis Sierra; Movistar Team
7–14 July 2024	(Italy); 2024 Giro d'Italia Women	6	(Germany) Liane Lippert; Movistar Team	(United States) Ruth Winder; Human Powered Health	(Italy) Erica Magnaldi; UAE Team ADQ
7–14 July 2024	(Italy); 2024 Giro d'Italia Women	7	(Australia) Neve Bradbury; Canyon//SRAM	(Belgium) Lotte Kopecky; Team SD Worx–Protime	(Italy) Elisa Longo Borghini; Lidl–Trek
7–14 July 2024	(Italy); 2024 Giro d'Italia Women	8	(Mauritius) Kimberley Le Court; AG Insurance–Soudal	(United States) Ruth Winder; Human Powered Health	(Germany) Franziska Koch; Team dsm–firmenich PostNL
7–14 July 2024	(Italy); 2024 Giro d'Italia Women	Overall	(Italy) Elisa Longo Borghini; Lidl–Trek; Winner	(Belgium) Lotte Kopecky; Team SD Worx–Protime; 2nd place	(Australia) Neve Bradbury; Canyon//SRAM; 3rd place
12–18 August 2024	2024 Tour de France Femmes	1	(Netherlands) Charlotte Kool; Team dsm–firmenich PostNL	(Finland) Anniina Ahtosalo; Uno-X Mobility	(Italy) Elisa Balsamo; Lidl–Trek
12–18 August 2024	2024 Tour de France Femmes	2	(Netherlands) Charlotte Kool; Team dsm–firmenich PostNL	(Netherlands) Lorena Wiebes; Team SD Worx–Protime	(Netherlands) Marianne Vos; Visma–Lease a Bike
12–18 August 2024	2024 Tour de France Femmes	3	(Netherlands) Demi Vollering; Team SD Worx–Protime	(United States) Chloé Dygert; Canyon//SRAM	(Netherlands) Loes Adegeest; FDJ–Suez
12–18 August 2024	2024 Tour de France Femmes	4	(Netherlands) Puck Pieterse; Fenix–Deceuninck	(Netherlands) Demi Vollering; Team SD Worx–Protime	(Poland) Katarzyna Niewiadoma; Canyon//SRAM
12–18 August 2024	2024 Tour de France Femmes	5	(Hungary) Blanka Vas; Team SD Worx–Protime	(Poland) Katarzyna Niewiadoma; Canyon//SRAM	(Germany) Liane Lippert; Movistar Team
12–18 August 2024	2024 Tour de France Femmes	6	(France) Cédrine Kerbaol; Ceratizit–WNT Pro Cycling	(Netherlands) Marianne Vos; Visma–Lease a Bike	(Germany) Liane Lippert; Movistar Team
12–18 August 2024	2024 Tour de France Femmes	7	(Belgium) Justine Ghekiere; AG Insurance–Soudal	(France) Maëva Squiban; Arkéa–B&B Hotels Women	(Netherlands) Demi Vollering; Team SD Worx–Protime
12–18 August 2024	2024 Tour de France Femmes	8	(Netherlands) Demi Vollering; Team SD Worx–Protime	(Netherlands) Pauliena Rooijakkers; Fenix–Deceuninck	(France) Évita Muzic; FDJ–Suez
12–18 August 2024	2024 Tour de France Femmes	Overall	(Poland) Katarzyna Niewiadoma; Canyon//SRAM; Winner	(Netherlands) Demi Vollering; Team SD Worx–Protime; 2nd place	(Netherlands) Pauliena Rooijakkers; Fenix–Deceuninck; 3rd place
24 August 2024	(France); 2024 Classic Lorient Agglomération-Trophée Ceratizit	1	(Netherlands) Mischa Bredewold; Team SD Worx–Protime	(United States) Chloé Dygert; Canyon//SRAM	(Germany) Liane Lippert; Movistar Team
6–8 September 2024	(Switzerland); 2024 Tour de Romandie Féminin	1	(Italy) Elisa Balsamo; Lidl–Trek	(Belgium) Lotte Kopecky; Team SD Worx–Protime	(Germany) Liane Lippert; Movistar Team
6–8 September 2024	(Switzerland); 2024 Tour de Romandie Féminin	2	(Netherlands) Demi Vollering; Team SD Worx–Protime	(Belgium) Lotte Kopecky; Team SD Worx–Protime	(Italy) Gaia Realini; Lidl–Trek
6–8 September 2024	(Switzerland); 2024 Tour de Romandie Féminin	3	(Netherlands) Riejanne Markus; Visma–Lease a Bike	(New Zealand) Niamh Fisher-Black; Team SD Worx–Protime	(Belgium) Lotte Kopecky; Team SD Worx–Protime
6–8 September 2024	(Switzerland); 2024 Tour de Romandie Féminin	Overall	(Belgium) Lotte Kopecky; Team SD Worx–Protime; Winner	(Netherlands) Demi Vollering; Team SD Worx–Protime; 2nd place	(Italy) Gaia Realini; Lidl–Trek; 3rd place
8–13 October 2024	(Netherlands); 2024 Simac Ladies Tour	1	(United Kingdom) Zoe Bäckstedt; Canyon//SRAM	(Netherlands) Lieke Nooijen; Visma–Lease a Bike	(Netherlands) Ellen van Dijk; Lidl–Trek
8–13 October 2024	(Netherlands); 2024 Simac Ladies Tour	2	(Netherlands) Lorena Wiebes; Team SD Worx–Protime	(Italy) Elisa Balsamo; Lidl–Trek	(Netherlands) Charlotte Kool; Team dsm–firmenich PostNL
8–13 October 2024	(Netherlands); 2024 Simac Ladies Tour	3	(Netherlands) Lorena Wiebes; Team SD Worx–Protime	(Italy) Elisa Balsamo; Lidl–Trek	(Belgium) Lotte Kopecky; Team SD Worx–Protime
8–13 October 2024	(Netherlands); 2024 Simac Ladies Tour	4	(Italy) Barbara Guarischi; Team SD Worx–Protime	(New Zealand) Ally Wollaston; AG Insurance–Soudal	(Italy) Maria Giulia Confalonieri; Uno-X Mobility
8–13 October 2024	(Netherlands); 2024 Simac Ladies Tour	5	(Netherlands) Lorena Wiebes; Team SD Worx–Protime	(Italy) Elisa Balsamo; Lidl–Trek	(Netherlands) Nienke Veenhoven; Visma–Lease a Bike
8–13 October 2024	(Netherlands); 2024 Simac Ladies Tour	6	(Belgium) Lotte Kopecky; Team SD Worx–Protime	(Netherlands) Lorena Wiebes; Team SD Worx–Protime	(Belgium) Marthe Truyen; Fenix–Deceuninck
8–13 October 2024	(Netherlands); 2024 Simac Ladies Tour	Overall	(Belgium) Lotte Kopecky; Team SD Worx–Protime; Winner	(Germany) Franziska Koch; Team dsm–firmenich PostNL; 2nd place	(United Kingdom) Zoe Bäckstedt; Canyon//SRAM; 3rd place
15–17 October 2024	(China); 2024 Tour of Chongming Island	1	(Netherlands) Mylène de Zoete; Ceratizit–WNT Pro Cycling	(Czech Republic) Tereza Neumanová; UAE Team ADQ	(Italy) Silvia Zanardi; Human Powered Health
15–17 October 2024	(China); 2024 Tour of Chongming Island	2	(Poland) Marta Lach; Ceratizit–WNT Pro Cycling	(Netherlands) Mylène de Zoete; Ceratizit–WNT Pro Cycling	(Austria) Kathrin Schweinberger; Ceratizit–WNT Pro Cycling
15–17 October 2024	(China); 2024 Tour of Chongming Island	3	(Poland) Marta Lach; Ceratizit–WNT Pro Cycling	(Netherlands) Scarlett Souren; Ceratizit–WNT Pro Cycling	(Netherlands) Sofie van Rooijen; Ceratizit–WNT Pro Cycling
15–17 October 2024	(China); 2024 Tour of Chongming Island	Overall	(Poland) Marta Lach; Ceratizit–WNT Pro Cycling; Winner	(Netherlands) Mylène de Zoete; Ceratizit–WNT Pro Cycling; 2nd place	(Netherlands) Scarlett Souren; Ceratizit–WNT Pro Cycling; 3rd place
20 October 2024	(China); 2024 Tour of Guangxi	Overall	(Spain) Sandra Alonso; Ceratizit–WNT Pro Cycling	(Italy) Giada Borghesi; Human Powered Health	(Poland) Marta Lach; Ceratizit–WNT Pro Cycling

== UCI Women's ProSeries ==
Date	Race	Podium		Podium	Podium
15–18 February 2024	(Spain); 2024 Setmana Valenciana / Vuelta CV Féminas	1	(Italy) Elisa Balsamo; Lidl–Trek	(Netherlands) Marianne Vos; Visma–Lease a Bike	(Switzerland) Noemi Rüegg; EF Education–EasyPost
15–18 February 2024	(Spain); 2024 Setmana Valenciana / Vuelta CV Féminas	2	(Switzerland) Marlen Reusser; Team SD Worx–Protime	(Netherlands) Marianne Vos; Visma–Lease a Bike	(France) Évita Muzic; FDJ–Suez
15–18 February 2024	(Spain); 2024 Setmana Valenciana / Vuelta CV Féminas	3	(New Zealand) Niamh Fisher-Black; Team SD Worx–Protime	(Italy) Gaia Realini; Lidl–Trek	(Poland) Katarzyna Niewiadoma; Canyon//SRAM
15–18 February 2024	(Spain); 2024 Setmana Valenciana / Vuelta CV Féminas	4	(Italy) Elisa Balsamo; Lidl–Trek	(Cuba) Arlenis Sierra; Movistar Team	(Italy) Nadia Quagliotto; Laboral Kutxa–Fundación Euskadi
15–18 February 2024	(Spain); 2024 Setmana Valenciana / Vuelta CV Féminas	Overall	(Switzerland) Marlen Reusser; Team SD Worx–Protime; Winner	(Poland) Katarzyna Niewiadoma; Canyon//SRAM; 2nd place	(New Zealand) Niamh Fisher-Black; Team SD Worx–Protime; 3rd place
13 March 2024	(Belgium); 2024 Danilith Nokere Koerse voor Dames	1	(Belgium) Lotte Kopecky; Team SD Worx–Protime; Winner	(Netherlands) Lorena Wiebes; Team SD Worx–Protime; 2nd place	(United States) Lily Williams; Human Powered Health; 3rd place
27 March 2024	(Belgium); 2024 Dwars door Vlaanderen	1	(Netherlands) Marianne Vos; Visma–Lease a Bike; Winner	(Netherlands) Shirin van Anrooij; Lidl–Trek; 2nd place	(Italy) Letizia Paternoster; Liv AlUla Jayco; 3rd place
10 April 2024	(Belgium); 2024 De Brabantse Pijl-La Flèche Brabançonne	1	(Italy) Elisa Longo Borghini; Lidl–Trek; Winner	(Netherlands) Demi Vollering; Team SD Worx–Protime; 2nd place	(Australia) Alexandra Manly; Liv AlUla Jayco; 3rd place
9 May 2024	(Spain); 2024 Navarra Women's Elite Classic	1	(Germany) Hannah Ludwig; Cofidis; Winner	(Cuba) Arlenis Sierra; Movistar Team; 2nd place	(Netherlands) Shirin van Anrooij; Lidl–Trek; 3rd place
26 May 2024	(Spain); 2024 Gran Premio Femenino Ciudad de Eibar	1	(Spain) Yurani Blanco; Laboral Kutxa–Fundación Euskadi; Winner	(Spain) Usoa Ostolaza; Laboral Kutxa–Fundación Euskadi; 2nd place	(New Zealand) Henrietta Christie; Human Powered Health; 3rd place
25–30 June 2024	(Germany); 2024 Thüringen Ladies Tour	1	(Belgium) Margot Vanpachtenbeke; VolkerWessels Cycling Team	(United States) Ruth Winder; Human Powered Health	Linda Riedmann; Germany (national team)
25–30 June 2024	(Germany); 2024 Thüringen Ladies Tour	2	(Italy) Martina Fidanza; Ceratizit–WNT Pro Cycling	(Italy) Barbara Guarischi; Team SD Worx–Protime	(Italy) Maria Giulia Confalonieri; Uno-X Mobility
25–30 June 2024	(Germany); 2024 Thüringen Ladies Tour	3	(Italy) Martina Fidanza; Ceratizit–WNT Pro Cycling	(Italy) Barbara Guarischi; Team SD Worx–Protime	(Canada) Maggie Coles-Lyster; Roland
25–30 June 2024	(Germany); 2024 Thüringen Ladies Tour	4	(Netherlands) Lucinda Brand; Lidl–Trek	(Netherlands) Karlijn Swinkels; UAE Team ADQ	(Netherlands) Mischa Bredewold; Team SD Worx–Protime
25–30 June 2024	(Germany); 2024 Thüringen Ladies Tour	5	(Netherlands) Mischa Bredewold; Team SD Worx–Protime	(Australia) Brodie Chapman; Lidl–Trek	(Austria) Christina Schweinberger; Fenix–Deceuninck
25–30 June 2024	(Germany); 2024 Thüringen Ladies Tour	6	(Spain) Sandra Alonso; Ceratizit–WNT Pro Cycling	(Canada) Maggie Coles-Lyster; Roland	(Netherlands) Lucinda Brand; Lidl–Trek
25–30 June 2024	(Germany); 2024 Thüringen Ladies Tour	Overall	(United States) Ruth Winder; Human Powered Health; Winner	(Netherlands) Mischa Bredewold; Team SD Worx–Protime; 2nd place	(Australia) Brodie Chapman; Lidl–Trek; 3rd place
15 September 2024	(Germany); 2024 Women's Cycling Grand Prix Stuttgart & Region	1	(Italy) Eleonora Gasparrini; UAE Team ADQ; Winner	(Netherlands) Lieke Nooijen; Visma–Lease a Bike; 2nd place	(Netherlands) Mareille Meijering; Movistar Team; 3rd place
5 October 2024	(Italy); 2024 Giro dell'Emilia Internazionale Donne Elite	1	(Italy) Elisa Longo Borghini; Lidl–Trek; Winner	(France) Évita Muzic; FDJ–Suez; 2nd place	(France) Juliette Labous; Team dsm–firmenich PostNL; 3rd place
8 October 2024	(Italy); 2024 Tre Valli Varesine	1	(France) Cédrine Kerbaol; Ceratizit–WNT Pro Cycling; Winner	(Italy) Silvia Persico; UAE Team ADQ; 2nd place	(Germany) Liane Lippert; Movistar Team; 3rd place

== Single day races (1.1 and 1.2) ==
Race	Date	Cat. †	Winner	Second	Third	Ref
(New Zealand) Gravel and Tar La Femme	20 January 2024	1.2	(New Zealand) Kate McCarthy	(New Zealand) Sammie Maxwell	(New Zealand) Charlotte Clarke	
(Spain) Trofeo Felanitx-Colònia de Sant Jordi	20 January 2024	1.1	(Switzerland) Noemi Rüegg; EF Education–EasyPost	(Cuba) Arlenis Sierra; Movistar Team	(Italy) Chiara Consonni; UAE Team ADQ	
(Spain) Trofeo Palma Femina	21 January 2024	1.1	(Canada) Magdeleine Vallieres; EF Education–EasyPost	(South Africa) Ashleigh Moolman Pasio; AG Insurance–Soudal	(Spain) Mavi García	
(Spain) Trofeo Binissalem-Andratx	22 January 2024	1.1	(Italy) Eleonora Gasparrini; UAE Team ADQ	(Switzerland) Noemi Rüegg; EF Education–EasyPost	(Italy) Nadia Quagliotto; Laboral Kutxa–Fundación Euskadi	
(Spain) Women Cycling Pro Costa De Almería	28 January 2024	1.1	(Canada) Olivia Baril; Movistar Team	(Spain) Ane Santesteban; Laboral Kutxa–Fundación Euskadi	(Poland) Karolina Perekitko; Winspace	
(Spain) Vuelta CV Feminas	4 February 2024	1.1	(France) Cédrine Kerbaol; Ceratizit Pro Cycling	(Netherlands) Marit Raaijmakers; Human Powered Health	(Italy) Federica Damiana Piergiovanni; Uno-X Mobility Development Team	
(Spain) Clasica de Almeria Femina	25 February 2024	1.1	(United States) Lauren Stephens; Cynisca Cycling	(Ukraine) Yuliia Biriukova; Human Powered Health	(Switzerland) Linda Zanetti; Human Powered Health	
(Belgium) Omloop van het Hageland Women's Elite	25 February 2024	1.1	(United States) Kristen Faulkner; EF Education–EasyPost	(Netherlands) Mischa Bredewold; Team SD Worx–Protime	(United Kingdom) Pfeiffer Georgi; Team dsm–firmenich PostNL	
(Belgium) Le Samyn des Dames	27 February 2024	1.1	(Italy) Vittoria Guazzini; Team dsm–firmenich PostNL	(Finland) Anniina Ahtosalo; Uno-X Mobility	(Austria) Christina Schweinberger; Fenix–Deceuninck	
(Croatia) Umag Trophy Ladies	28 February 2024	1.2	(Italy) Sara Fiorin; Uno-X Mobility	(Italy) Michela De Grandis; Team Mendelspeck E-Work	(Italy) Emma Bernardi; Team Mendelspeck E-Work	
(Italy) Trofeo Oro in Euro Women's Bike Race	3 March 2024	1.1	(Italy) Elisa Longo Borghini; Lidl–Trek	(Netherlands) Karlijn Swinkels; UAE Team ADQ	(United States) Ruth Edwards; Human Powered Health	
(Croatia) Poreč Trophy Ladies	3 March 2024	1.2	(Hungary) Petra Zsankó	(Estonia) Elisabeth Ebras; Uno-X Mobility	(Slovenia) Urša Pintar; Born to Win BTC City Ljubljana Zhiraf	
Grand Prix Suf City El Salvador	4 March 2024	1.1	(Cyprus) Antri Christoforou; Roland	(Italy) Elena Pirrone; Roland	(Colombia) Lorena Villamizar; Boneshaker Project p/b Roxo	
Grand Prix El Salvador	5 March 2024	1.1	(Italy) Valentina Basilico; Eneicat–CMTeam	Tamara Dronova; Roland	(Netherlands) Sylvie Swinkels; Roland	
(Belgium) GP Oetingen	6 March 2024	1.1	(Netherlands) Lorena Wiebes; Team SD Worx–Protime	(Netherlands) Thalita de Jong; Lotto–Intermarché Ladies	(United Kingdom) Josie Nelson; Team dsm–firmenich PostNL	
(El Salvador) Grand Prix Presidente	6 March 2024	1.1	(Switzerland) Elena Hartmann; Roland	(Italy) Giorgia Vettorello; Roland	Tamara Dronova; Roland	
(Netherlands) Drentse Acht van Westerveld	9 March 2024	1.1	(Netherlands) Sofie van Rooijen; VolkerWessels Cycling Team	(Italy) Chiara Consonni; UAE Team ADQ	(Italy) Rachele Barbieri; Team dsm–firmenich PostNL	
(El Salvador) Grand Prix MOPT	13 March 2024	1.1	(Chile) Aranza Villalón; Soltec Iberoamérica	Tamara Dronova; Roland	(Austria) Anna Kiesenhofer; Roland	
(Belgium) Ronde de Mouscron	1 April 2024	1.1	(Poland) Daria Pikulik; Human Powered Health	(Finland) Anniina Ahtosalo; Uno-X Mobility	(Italy) Martina Fidanza; Ceratizit–WNT Pro Cycling	
(France) Région Pays de la Loire Tour - Féminin	3 April 2024	1.1	Michaela Drummond (NZL); Arkéa–B&B Hotels Women	Victorie Guilman (FRA); St. Michel–Mavic–Auber93	Lucinda Stewart (AUS); ARA Skip Capital	
(Belgium) Scheldeprijs vrouwen elite	3 April 2024	1.1	Lorena Wiebes (NED); Team SD Worx–Protime	Charlotte Kool (NED); Team dsm–firmenich PostNL	Martina Fidanza (ITA); Ceratizit–WNT Pro Cycling	
(France) Grand Prix Féminin de Chambéry	14 April 2024	1.1	Lore De Schepper (BEL); AG Insurance–NXTG U23 Team	Évita Muzic (FRA); FDJ–Suez	Erica Magnaldi (ITA); UAE Development Team	
(Netherlands) EPZ Omloop van Borsele	20 April 2024	1.1	Sofie van Rooijen (NED); VolkerWessels Cycling Team	Daria Pikulik (POL); Human Powered Health	Elynor Bäckstedt (GBR); Lidl–Trek	
(Italy) Gran Premio della Liberazione	25 April 2024	1.1	Chiara Consonni (ITA); UAE Team ADQ	Silvia Persico (ITA); UAE Team ADQ	Eleonora Gasparrini (ITA); UAE Team ADQ	
(Luxembourg) CERATIZIT Festival Elsy Jacobs Garnich	27 April 2024	1.2	Marta Lach (POL); Ceratizit Pro Cycling	Christine Majerus (LUX); Team SD Worx–Protime	Katrine Aalerud (NOR); Uno-X Mobility	
CERATIZIT Festival Elsy Jacobs Luxembourg	28 April 2024	1.2	Marta Lach (POL); Ceratizit Pro Cycling	Scarlett Souren (NED); Ceratizit Pro Cycling	Anouska Koster (NED); Uno-X Mobility	
(Belgium) Cyclis Classic	1 May 2024	1.2	Anne Knijnenburg (NED); VolkerWessels Cycling Team	Federica Venturelli (ITA); UAE Team Emirates XRG	Scarlett Souren (NED); VolkerWessels Cycling Team	
(France) La Classique Morbihan	3 May 2024	1.2	Eleonora Gasparrini (ITA); UAE Team ADQ	Marta Lach (POL); Ceratizit Pro Cycling	Jade Wiel (FRA); FDJ–Suez	
(France) Grand Prix du Morbihan Femmes	4 May 2024	1.1	Silvia Persico (ITA); UAE Team ADQ	Victoire Berteau (FRA); Cofidis	Marta Lach (POL); Ceratizit Pro Cycling	
(Belgium) GP Eco-Struct	4 May 2024	1.1	Chiara Consonni (ITA); UAE Team ADQ	Anniina Ahtosalo (FIN); Uno-X Mobility	Daria Pikulik (POL); Human Powered Health	
(Belgium) Trofee Maarten Wynants	5 May 2024	1.1	Anniina Ahtosalo (FIN); Uno-X Mobility	Scarlett Souren (NED); Ceratizit Pro Cycling	Chiara Consonni (ITA); UAE Team ADQ	
(Serbia) Belgrade GP Woman Tour	12 May 2024	1.2	Hanna Tserakh; Born to Win BTC City Ljubljana Zhiraf	Petra Zsankó (HUN); RC ARBÖ-ASKÖ Rapso Knittelfeld	Lara Crestanello (ITA); Born to Win BTC City Ljubljana Zhiraf	
(Spain) Durango - Durango Emakumeen Saria	14 May 2024	1.1	Cédrine Kerbaol (FRA); Ceratizit–WNT Pro Cycling	Évita Muzic (FRA); FDJ–Suez	Thalita de Jong (NED); Lotto–Dstny Ladies	
(Netherlands) Veenendaal - Veenendaal Classic	17 May 2024	1.1	Riejanne Markus (NED); Visma–Lease a Bike	Barbara Guarischi (ITA); Team SD Worx–Protime	Marthe Truyen (BEL); Fenix–Deceuninck	
(Belgium) Antwerp Port Epic Ladies	19 May 2024	1.1	Lara Gillespie (IRL); UAE Development Team	Zoe Bäckstedt (GBR); Canyon–SRAM Generation	Babette van der Wolf (NED); Lifeplus Wahoo	
(Netherlands) ZLM Omloop der Kempen Ladies	25 May 2024	1.2	Sara Fiorin (ITA); UAE Development Team	Lara Gillespie (IRL); UAE Development Team	Marjolein van 't Geloof (NED); Hess Cycling Team	
Ladies Tour of Estonia	25 May 2024	1.2	Eline van Rooijen (NED); Hitec Products–Fluid Control	Olivija Baleišytė (LTU); Lithuania (national team)	Laura Lizette Sander (EST); Estonia (national team)	
(Belgium) Dwars door de Westhoek	2 June 2024	1.1	Kathrin Schweinberger (AUT); Ceratizit Pro Cycling	Lauretta Hanson (AUS); Lidl–Trek	Lily Williams (AUS); Human Powered Health	
(France) Alpes Gresivaudan Classic	2 June 2024	1.1	Marion Bunel (FRA); St. Michel–Preference Home–Auber93	Évita Muzic (FRA); FDJ United–Suez	Julie Bego (FRA); Cofidis	
(Honduras) Elite Road Central American Championships ITT	6 June 2024	1.2	Annibel Prieto (PAN); Panama (national team)	Gabriela Soto (GUA); Guatemala (national team)	Wendy Ducreux (PAN); Panama (national team)	
(Honduras) Elite Road Central American Championships TTT	7 June 2024	1.2	Guatemala (national team); Cintia Lee; Bridggett Rodríguez; Ashley Méndez; Gabriela Soto	Costa Rica (national team); Alondra Granados; Sofía Quirós; Diandra Ramírez; María Fernanda Sánchez	Panama (national team); Iris León; Maraya López; Annibel Prieto; Wendy Ducreux	
(Belgium) Elmos Dwars door het Hageland	8 June 2024	1.1	Lucinda Brand (NED); Lidl–Trek	Thalita de Jong (NED); Lotto–Intermarché Ladies	Karlijn Swinkels (NED); UAE Team ADQ	
(Belgium) SPAR Flanders Diamond Tour	9 June 2024	1.1	Chiara Consonni (ITA); UAE Team ADQ	Anniina Ahtosalo (FIN); Uno-X Mobility	Kathrin Schweinberger (AUT); Ceratizit Pro Cycling	
(Honduras) Elite Road Central American Championships RR	9 June 2024	1.2	Gabriela Soto (GUA); Guatemala (national team)	Wendy Ducreux (PAN); Panama (national team)	Cintia Lee (GUA); Guatemala (national team)	
Groupama Ladies Race Slovakia	6 July 2024	1.2	Viktória Chladoňová (SVK); Euromix	Karolina Perekitko (POL); Poland (national team)	Urša Pintar (SVN); Born to Win BTC City Ljubljana Zhiraf	
(Belgium) Argenta Classic	7 July 2024	1.1	Daria Pikulik (POL); Human Powered Health	Scarlett Souren (NED); VolkerWessels Cycling Team	Flora Perkins (GBR); Fenix–Premier Tech	
(Belgium) Grote Prijs CHW Beveren	14 July 2024	1.2	Fien van Eynde (BEL); Fenix-Deceuninck Development Team	Anna Vanderaerden (BEL); Fenix-Deceuninck Development Team	Febe Poppe (BEL); Proximus–Cyclis	
(France) La Périgord Ladies	20 July 2024	1.2	Josie Talbot (AUS); Cofidis	Margot Vanpachtenbeke (BEL); VolkerWessels Cycling Team	Nina Buijsman (NED); FDJ–Suez	
(France) La Picto - Charentaise	21 July 2024	1.2	Sheyla Gutiérrez (ESP); Movistar Team	Emma Norsgaard (DEN); Movistar Team	Eline Jansen (NED); VolkerWessels Cycling Team	
(France) Kreiz Breizh Elites Féminin	30 July 2024	1.1	Anouska Koster (NED); Uno-X Mobility	Alice Barnes (GBR); Human Powered Health	Marta Jaskulska (POL); Ceratizit Pro Cycling	
(Belgium) Grote Prijs Yvonne Reynders	15 August 2024	1.1	Scarlett Souren (NED); VolkerWessels Cycling Team	Evy Kuijpers (NED); Fenix–Deceuninck	Femke Beuling (NED); VolkerWessels Cycling Team	
(Belgium) Egmont Cycling Race Women	20 August 2024	1.2	Lieke Nooijen (NED); Visma–Lease a Bike	Sofie van Rooijen (NED); VolkerWessels Cycling Team	Nienke Veenhoven (NED); Visma–Lease a Bike	
(Belgium) GP Lucien Van Impe	22 August 2024	1.2	Evy Kuijpers (NED); Fenix–Deceuninck	Anastasiya Kolesava (); Canyon–SRAM Generation	Sofie van Rooijen (NED); VolkerWessels Cycling Team	
(Belgium) Konvert Koerse	23 August 2024	1.2	Sofie van Rooijen (NED); VolkerWessels Cycling Team	Chiara Consonni (ITA); UAE Development Team	Daria Pikulik (POL); Human Powered Health	
(Belgium) Grote prijs Beerens	1 September 2024	1.1	Sofie van Rooijen (NED); VolkerWessels Cycling Team	Anna van Wersch (NED); Lotto–Dstny Ladies	Victoire Berteau (FRA); Cofidis	
(Switzerland) Chrono «Roland bouge !»	1 September 2024	1.2	Cédrine Kerbaol (FRA); Ceratizit–WNT Pro Cycling	Marta Jaskulska (POL); Ceratizit–WNT Pro Cycling	Elena Hartmann (SUI); Roland	
(France) La Choralis Fourmies Féminine	8 September 2024	1.1	Silvia Zanardi (ITA); Human Powered Health	Cat Ferguson (GBR); Movistar Team	Martina Alzini (ITA); Cofidis	
(France) Grand Prix International d'Isbergues	15 September 2024	1.1	Maaike Boogaard (NED); AG Insurance–Soudal	Victoire Berteau (FRA); Cofidis	Alba Teruel Ribes (ESP); Laboral Kutxa–Fundación Euskadi	
(Spain) Pionera Race	15 September 2024	1.2	Debora Silvestri (ITA); Laboral Kutxa–Fundación Euskadi	Catalina Soto (CHI); Laboral Kutxa–Fundación Euskadi	Awen Roberts (GBR); Canyon–SRAM Generation	
(Belgium) Saint-Feuillien Grand Prix de Wallonie	18 September 2024	1.1	Karlijn Swinkels (NED); UAE Team ADQ	Elisa Longo Borghini (ITA); Lidl–Trek	Anouska Koster (NED); Uno-X Mobility	
(Canada) Chrono Gatineau	20 September 2024	1.1	Franziska Brauße (GER); Ceratizit–WNT Pro Cycling	Nadia Gontova (CAN); DNA Pro Cycling	Marta Jaskulska (POL); Ceratizit–WNT Pro Cycling	
(Canada) Tour de Gatineau	21 September 2024	1.1	Letizia Paternoster (ITA); Liv AlUla Jayco	Marlies Mejías (CUB); Virginia's Blue Ridge–Twenty24	Sarah Van Dam (CAN); DNA Pro Cycling	
(Belgium) Binche-Chimay-Binche pour Dames	1 October 2024	1.1	Cat Ferguson (GBR); Movistar Team	Christina Schweinberger (AUT); Fenix–Deceuninck	Anniina Ahtosalo (FIN); Uno-X Mobility	
(France) Chrono des Nations	13 October 2024	1.1	Grace Brown (AUS); FDJ–Suez	Vittoria Guazzini (ITA); FDJ–Suez	Anna Kiesenhofer (AUT); Roland	

== Stage races (2.1 and 2.2) ==
Race	Date	Cat. †	Winner	Second	Third	Ref
26–29 October 2023	Vuelta Femenina al Ecuador	1	(Ecuador) Esther Galarza; Eagle Bikes	(Ecuador) María Paula Pazmiño; Team Toscana	Natalia Vásquez; Best PC Ecuador	
26–29 October 2023	Vuelta Femenina al Ecuador	2	Marcela Peñafiel; Best PC Ecuador	(Ecuador) Esther Galarza; Eagle Bikes	Natalia Vásquez; Best PC Ecuador	
26–29 October 2023	Vuelta Femenina al Ecuador	3	Marcela Peñafiel; Best PC Ecuador	(Ecuador) Esther Galarza; Eagle Bikes	Natalia Vásquez; Best PC Ecuador	
26–29 October 2023	Vuelta Femenina al Ecuador	4	Natalia Vásquez; Best PC Ecuador	Marcela Peñafiel; Best PC Ecuador	(Ecuador) Carol Masabanda; Team Banco Guayaquil	
26–29 October 2023	Vuelta Femenina al Ecuador	Overall	(Ecuador) Esther Galarza; Eagle Bikes; Winner	(Ecuador) Marcela Peñafiel; Best PC Ecuador; 2nd place	(Ecuador) Natalia Vásquez; Best PC Ecuador; 3rd place	
5–8 March 2024	(Italy); Trofeo Ponente in Rosa	Prologue	Alessandra Keller; Switzerland	Linda Indergand; Switzerland	Linda Zanetti; Switzerland	
5–8 March 2024	(Italy); Trofeo Ponente in Rosa	1	(New Zealand) Kim Cadzow; EF Education–EasyPost	(United States) Kristen Faulkner; EF Education–EasyPost	Linda Zanetti; Switzerland	
5–8 March 2024	(Italy); Trofeo Ponente in Rosa	2	(United States) Kristen Faulkner; EF Education–EasyPost	(New Zealand) Kim Cadzow; EF Education–EasyPost	(Germany) Leonie Laubig; Primeau Vélo - Groupe Abadie	
5–8 March 2024	(Italy); Trofeo Ponente in Rosa	3	(United States) Kristen Faulkner; EF Education–EasyPost	(France) Ema Comte; Team Féminin Chambéry	(Brazil) Ana Vitória Magalhães; Vini Fantini–BePink	
5–8 March 2024	(Italy); Trofeo Ponente in Rosa	Overall	(New Zealand) Kim Cadzow; EF Education–EasyPost; Winner	(United States) Kristen Faulkner; EF Education–EasyPost; 2nd place	(Canada) Clara Emond; EF Education–EasyPost; 3rd place	
8–10 March 2024	(Spain); Vuelta Extremadura Féminas	1	(Canada) Olivia Baril; Movistar Team	(Australia) Brodie Chapman; Lidl–Trek	(Netherlands) Mareille Meijering; Movistar Team	
8–10 March 2024	(Spain); Vuelta Extremadura Féminas	2	(Netherlands) Mareille Meijering; Movistar Team	(Italy) Gaia Realini; Lidl–Trek	(France) Océane Mahé; Arkéa–B&B Hotels Women	
8–10 March 2024	(Spain); Vuelta Extremadura Féminas	3	(Netherlands) Ellen van Dijk; Lidl–Trek	(Australia) Brodie Chapman; Lidl–Trek	(Sweden) Stina Kagevi; Team Coop–Repsol	
8–10 March 2024	(Spain); Vuelta Extremadura Féminas	Overall	(Netherlands) Mareille Meijering; Movistar Team; Winner	(Italy) Gaia Realini; Lidl–Trek; 2nd place	(Australia) Brodie Chapman; Lidl–Trek; 3rd place	
8–12 March 2024	Vuelta a El Salvador Femenina	Prologue	(Switzerland) Elena Hartmann; Roland	Tamara Dronova; Roland	(Canada) Kiara Lylyk; Boneshaker Project p/b Orange Seal	
8–12 March 2024	Vuelta a El Salvador Femenina	1	(Switzerland) Elena Hartmann; Roland	(Canada) Emily Marcolini; Boneshaker Project p/b Orange Seal	(Italy) Giorgia Vettorello; Roland	
8–12 March 2024	Vuelta a El Salvador Femenina	2	(Italy) Valentina Basilico; Eneicat–CMTeam	(Colombia) Karen González; Sistecredito GW	Tamara Dronova; Roland	
8–12 March 2024	Vuelta a El Salvador Femenina	3	Tamara Dronova; Roland	(Colombia) Andrea Alzate; Eneicat–CMTeam	(Chile) Aranza Villalón; Soltec Iberoamérica	
8–12 March 2024	Vuelta a El Salvador Femenina	4	Tamara Dronova; Roland	Olga Shekel; Ukraine (national team)	(Netherlands) Sylvie Swinkels; Roland	
8–12 March 2024	Vuelta a El Salvador Femenina	Overall	(Switzerland) Elena Hartmann; Roland; Winner	Tamara Dronova; Roland; 2nd place	(Cyprus) Antri Christoforou; Roland; 3rd place	
14–17 March 2024	(France); Tour de Normandie féminin	1	(Netherlands) Ellen van Dijk; Lidl–Trek	(Netherlands) Riejanne Markus; Visma–Lease a Bike	(Netherlands) Lieke Nooijen; Visma–Lease a Bike	
14–17 March 2024	(France); Tour de Normandie féminin	2	(Spain) Sandra Alonso; Ceratizit–WNT Pro Cycling	(Netherlands) Thalita de Jong; Lotto–Intermarché Ladies	(Italy) Maria Giulia Confalonieri; Uno-X Mobility	
14–17 March 2024	(France); Tour de Normandie féminin	3	(United States) Lauren Stephens; Cynisca Cycling	(France) Victoire Berteau; Cofidis	(France) Gladys Verhulst; Groupama–FDJ	
14–17 March 2024	(France); Tour de Normandie féminin	4	(United Kingdom) Josie Nelson; Team dsm–firmenich PostNL	(Canada) Ava Holmgren; Lidl–Trek	(Norway) Mie Bjørndal Ottestad; Uno-X Mobility	
14–17 March 2024	(France); Tour de Normandie féminin	Overall	(Norway) Mie Bjørndal Ottestad; Uno-X Mobility; Winner	(United Kingdom) Josie Nelson; Team dsm–firmenich PostNL; 2nd place	(Netherlands) Ellen van Dijk; Lidl–Trek; 3rd place	
14–17 March 2024	Vuelta Femenina a Guatemala	1	(Italy) Valentina Basilico; Eneicat–CMTeam	(Colombia) Nicoll García; Pato Bike BMC Team	(Colombia) Lina Rojas; Pato Bike BMC Team	
14–17 March 2024	Vuelta Femenina a Guatemala	2	(United States) Kira Payer; Boneshaker Project p/b Orange Seal	(Colombia) Natalia Garzon; Sistecredito - GW	(Mexico) Marcela Prieto; Pato Bike BMC Team	
14–17 March 2024	Vuelta Femenina a Guatemala	3	(Colombia) Karen Villamizar; Boneshaker Project p/b Orange Seal	(Colombia) Lina Rojas; Pato Bike BMC Team	(Italy) Valentina Basilico; Eneicat–CMTeam	
14–17 March 2024	Vuelta Femenina a Guatemala	4	(Portugal) Daniela Campos; Eneicat–CMTeam	(Italy) Valentina Basilico; Eneicat–CMTeam	(Colombia) Lina Rojas; Pato Bike BMC Team	
14–17 March 2024	Vuelta Femenina a Guatemala	Overall	(Italy) Valentina Basilico; Eneicat–CMTeam; Winner	(Colombia) Lina Rojas; Pato Bike BMC Team; 2nd place	(Colombia) Natalia Garzon; Sistecredito - GW; 3rd place	
8–10 April 2024	Women's Tour of Thailand	1	Nguyễn Thị Thật; Vietnam (national team)	Jutatip Maneephan; Thailand Women's Cycling Team	(Australia) Claudia Marcks; Bikewheels.com.au Cycling Team	
8–10 April 2024	Women's Tour of Thailand	2	Nguyễn Thị Thật; Vietnam (national team)	Jutatip Maneephan; Thailand Women's Cycling Team	Nur Aisyah Mohamad Zubir; Malaysia (national team)	
8–10 April 2024	Women's Tour of Thailand	3	Jutatip Maneephan; Thailand Women's Cycling Team	(Australia) Claudia Marcks; Bikewheels.com.au Cycling Team	Nguyễn Thị Thật; Vietnam (national team)	
8–10 April 2024	Women's Tour of Thailand	Overall	Jutatip Maneephan; Thailand Women's Cycling Team; Winner	Nguyễn Thị Thật; Vietnam (national team); 2nd place	(Australia) Claudia Marcks; Bikewheels.com.au Cycling Team; 3rd place	
19–23 April 2024	(Italy); Giro Mediterraneo Rosa	1	(Italy) Giada Borghesi; BTC City Ljubljana Zhiraf Ambedo	(Republic of Ireland) Lara Gillespie; UAE Development Team	(Italy) Federica Venturelli; UAE Development Team	
19–23 April 2024	(Italy); Giro Mediterraneo Rosa	2	(Republic of Ireland) Lara Gillespie; UAE Development Team	(Italy) Federica Venturelli; UAE Development Team	(Italy) Giada Borghesi; BTC City Ljubljana Zhiraf Ambedo	
19–23 April 2024	(Italy); Giro Mediterraneo Rosa	3	(Republic of Ireland) Lara Gillespie; UAE Development Team	(Poland) Karolina Kumięga; UAE Development Team	(Kazakhstan) Akpeiil Ossim; Astana Dewi Women Team	
19–23 April 2024	(Italy); Giro Mediterraneo Rosa	4	(Italy) Federica Venturelli; UAE Development Team	(Republic of Ireland) Lara Gillespie; UAE Development Team	(Italy) Asia Zontone; Isolmant–Premac–Vittoria	
19–23 April 2024	(Italy); Giro Mediterraneo Rosa	5	(Italy) Federica Venturelli; UAE Development Team	(Mexico) Romina Hinojosa; A.R. Monex Pro Cycling Team	(Argentina) Fernanda Yapura; Team Abadie-Magnan	
19–23 April 2024	(Italy); Giro Mediterraneo Rosa	Overall	(Republic of Ireland) Lara Gillespie; UAE Development Team; Winner	(Italy) Federica Venturelli; UAE Development Team; 2nd place	(Italy) Giada Borghesi; BTC City Ljubljana Zhiraf Ambedo; 3rd place	
24–28 April 2024	(United States); Tour of the Gila	1	(United States) Lauren Stephens; Cynisca Cycling	(Canada) Nadia Gontova; DNA Pro Cycling	(Mexico) Marcela Prieto; PAS - Steve Tilford Foundation	
24–28 April 2024	(United States); Tour of the Gila	2	(Cuba) Marlies Mejías; Virginia's Blue Ridge–Twenty28	(Uzbekistan) Yanina Kuskova; Tashkent City Women Professional Cycling Team	(United States) Lauren Stephens; Cynisca Cycling	
24–28 April 2024	(United States); Tour of the Gila	3	(United States) Lauren Stephens; Cynisca Cycling	(United States) Alia Shafi; Fount Cycling Guild	(France) Cécile Lejeune; PAS - Steve Tilford Foundation	
24–28 April 2024	(United States); Tour of the Gila	4	(United States) Chloe Patrick; Cynisca Cycling	(Cuba) Marlies Mejías; Virginia's Blue Ridge–Twenty28	(United States) Lauren Stephens; Cynisca Cycling	
24–28 April 2024	(United States); Tour of the Gila	5	(United States) Elizabeth Dixon; Fount Cycling Guild	(United States) Lauren Stephens; Cynisca Cycling	(Belgium) Eleanor Wiseman; Fount Cycling Guild	
24–28 April 2024	(United States); Tour of the Gila	Overall	(United States) Lauren Stephens; Cynisca Cycling; Winner	(Canada) Nadia Gontova; DNA Pro Cycling; 2nd place	(Belgium) Eleanor Wiseman; Fount Cycling Guild; 3rd place	
25–28 April 2024	(Czech Republic); Gracia–Orlová	1	(Germany) Corinna Lechner; Wheel Divas	(Belgium) Lore De Schepper; AG Insurance–NXTG U23 Team	Urša Pintar; Slovenia (national team)	
25–28 April 2024	(Czech Republic); Gracia–Orlová	2	(Netherlands) Mirre Knaven; AG Insurance–NXTG U23 Team	(Belgium) Xaydée Van Sinaey; Fenix-Deceuninck Development Team	(Germany) Corinna Lechner; Wheel Divas	
25–28 April 2024	(Czech Republic); Gracia–Orlová	3	(Austria) Tabea Huys; Maxx-Solar Rose Women Racing	(Germany) Corinna Lechner; Wheel Divas	(Belgium) Marion Norbert-Riberolle; Fenix-Deceuninck Development Team	
25–28 April 2024	(Czech Republic); Gracia–Orlová	4	(United Kingdom) Emma Jeffers; Liv AlUla Jayco Women's Continental Team	(Netherlands) Mirre Knaven; AG Insurance–NXTG U23 Team	(Poland) Olga Wankiewicz; MAT Atom Deweloper Wrocław	
25–28 April 2024	(Czech Republic); Gracia–Orlová	5	(United Kingdom) Emma Jeffers; Liv AlUla Jayco Women's Continental Team	(Poland) Olga Wankiewicz; MAT Atom Deweloper Wrocław	(Czech Republic) Nikola Bajgerová; MAT Atom Deweloper Wrocław	
25–28 April 2024	(Czech Republic); Gracia–Orlová	Overall	(Germany) Corinna Lechner; Wheel Divas; Winner	(Netherlands) Mirre Knaven; AG Insurance–NXTG U23 Team; 2nd place	(Slovenia) Urška Žigart; Liv AlUla Jayco Women's Continental Team; 3rd place	
22–24 May 2024	(France); Bretagne Ladies Tour	1	(Australia) Grace Brown; FDJ United–Suez	(Netherlands) Amber Kraak; FDJ United–Suez	(France) Marie Le Net; FDJ United–Suez	
22–24 May 2024	(France); Bretagne Ladies Tour	2	(Australia) Sarah Roy; Cofidis	(Italy) Alessia Vigilia; FDJ United–Suez	(Belgium) Sanne Cant; Fenix–Premier Tech	
22–24 May 2024	(France); Bretagne Ladies Tour	3	(Australia) Grace Brown; FDJ United–Suez	(Netherlands) Thalita de Jong; Lotto–Intermarché Ladies	(Belgium) Fien van Eynde; Fenix–Premier Tech	
22–24 May 2024	(France); Bretagne Ladies Tour	Overall	(Australia) Grace Brown; FDJ United–Suez; Winner	(Italy) Alessia Vigilia; FDJ United–Suez; 2nd place	(Netherlands) Amber Kraak; FDJ United–Suez; 3rd place	
23–26 May 2024	(Czech Republic); Tour de Feminin	1	(Czech Republic) Julia Kopecký; AG Insurance–NXTG U23 Team	(Netherlands) Maud Rijnbeek; AG Insurance–NXTG U23 Team	(Belgium) Lore De Schepper; AG Insurance–NXTG U23 Team	
23–26 May 2024	(Czech Republic); Tour de Feminin	2	(Czech Republic) Julia Kopecký; AG Insurance–NXTG U23 Team	(Netherlands) Femke de Vries; GT Krush Rebellease	(United Kingdom) Eilidh Shaw; Alba Development Road Team	
23–26 May 2024	(Czech Republic); Tour de Feminin	3	(Czech Republic) Nikola Bajgerová; MAT Atom Deweloper Wrocław	(Netherlands) Mirre Knaven; AG Insurance–NXTG U23 Team	(Netherlands) Femke de Vries; GT Krush Rebellease	
23–26 May 2024	(Czech Republic); Tour de Feminin	4	(Netherlands) Mirre Knaven; AG Insurance–NXTG U23 Team	(Czech Republic) Julia Kopecký; AG Insurance–NXTG U23 Team	(United Kingdom) Eilidh Shaw; Alba Development Road Team	
23–26 May 2024	(Czech Republic); Tour de Feminin	Overall	(Czech Republic) Julia Kopecký; AG Insurance–NXTG U23 Team; Winner	(Netherlands) Femke de Vries; GT Krush Rebellease; 2nd place	Xaydée Van Sinaey; Belgium (national team); 3rd place	
27–29 May 2024	(Uzbekistan); 2024 Tour of Bostonliq Ladies	1	(Uzbekistan) Yanina Kuskova; Samarkand Region	(Kazakhstan) Faina Potapova; Astana Dewi Women Team	(Kazakhstan) Akpeiil Ossim; Astana Dewi Women Team	
27–29 May 2024	(Uzbekistan); 2024 Tour of Bostonliq Ladies	2	(South Korea) Lee Eun-hee; Samyang Women's Cycling Team	(Uzbekistan) Margarita Misyurina; Samarkand Region	(Uzbekistan) Yanina Kuskova; Samarkand Region	
27–29 May 2024	(Uzbekistan); 2024 Tour of Bostonliq Ladies	3	(Kazakhstan) Bota Batyrbekova; Astana Dewi Women Team	(Kazakhstan) Violetta Kazakova; Astana Dewi Women Team	(Iran) Somayeh Yazdani; MIX Az Watuba UAE	
27–29 May 2024	(Uzbekistan); 2024 Tour of Bostonliq Ladies	Overall	(Uzbekistan) Yanina Kuskova; Samarkand Region; Winner	(Kazakhstan) Faina Potapova; Astana Dewi Women Team; 2nd place	(Kazakhstan) Akpeiil Ossim; Astana Dewi Women Team; 3rd place	
29 May – 1 June 2024	(Spain); 2024 Vuelta Andalucía Elite Women	1	(Netherlands) Silke Smulders; Liv AlUla Jayco	(Spain) Mavi García; Liv AlUla Jayco	(New Zealand) Ella Wyllie; Liv AlUla Jayco	
29 May – 1 June 2024	(Spain); 2024 Vuelta Andalucía Elite Women	2	(Spain) Mavi García; Liv AlUla Jayco	(Netherlands) Silke Smulders; Liv AlUla Jayco	(Norway) Mie Bjørndal Ottestad; Uno-X Mobility	
29 May – 1 June 2024	(Spain); 2024 Vuelta Andalucía Elite Women	3	(New Zealand) Ella Wyllie; Liv AlUla Jayco	(Spain) Mavi García; Liv AlUla Jayco	(Netherlands) Silke Smulders; Liv AlUla Jayco	
29 May – 1 June 2024	(Spain); 2024 Vuelta Andalucía Elite Women	4	(Cuba) Arlenis Sierra; Movistar Team	(Netherlands) Quinty Ton; Liv AlUla Jayco	Alena Amialiusik; Uno-X Mobility	
29 May – 1 June 2024	(Spain); 2024 Vuelta Andalucía Elite Women	Overall	(Spain) Mavi García; Liv AlUla Jayco; Winner	(Netherlands) Silke Smulders; Liv AlUla Jayco; 2nd place	(New Zealand) Ella Wyllie; Liv AlUla Jayco; 3rd place	
7–9 June 2024	(Spain); Volta Femenina Ciclista a Catalunya	1	(New Zealand) Ally Wollaston; AG Insurance–Soudal	(Netherlands) Marianne Vos; Visma–Lease a Bike	(Cuba) Arlenis Sierra; Movistar Team	
7–9 June 2024	(Spain); Volta Femenina Ciclista a Catalunya	2	(Netherlands) Marianne Vos; Visma–Lease a Bike	(Netherlands) Riejanne Markus; Visma–Lease a Bike	(Norway) Katrine Aalerud; Uno-X Mobility	
7–9 June 2024	(Spain); Volta Femenina Ciclista a Catalunya	3	(New Zealand) Ally Wollaston; AG Insurance–Soudal	(Netherlands) Marianne Vos; Visma–Lease a Bike	(Italy) Vittoria Guazzini; FDJ United–Suez	
7–9 June 2024	(Spain); Volta Femenina Ciclista a Catalunya	Overall	(Netherlands) Marianne Vos; Visma–Lease a Bike; Winner	(Netherlands) Riejanne Markus; Visma–Lease a Bike; 2nd place	(Norway) Katrine Aalerud; Uno-X Mobility; 3rd place	
14–16 June 2024	(France); Tour féminin international des Pyrénées	1	(Italy) Vittoria Guazzini; FDJ United–Suez	(Australia) Josie Talbot; Cofidis	(Mexico) Marcela Prieto; Pato Bike BMC Team	
14–16 June 2024	(France); Tour féminin international des Pyrénées	2	(Spain) Usoa Ostolaza; Laboral Kutxa–Fundación Euskadi	(Austria) Valentina Cavallar; Arkéa–B&B Hotels Women	(Spain) Yurani Blanco; Laboral Kutxa–Fundación Euskadi	
14–16 June 2024	(France); Tour féminin international des Pyrénées	3	(Australia) Josie Talbot; Cofidis	(Belgium) Lotte Claes; Arkéa–B&B Hotels Women	(Italy) Giada Borghesi; BTC City Ljubljana Zhiraf Ambedo	
14–16 June 2024	(France); Tour féminin international des Pyrénées	Overall	(Spain) Usoa Ostolaza; Laboral Kutxa–Fundación Euskadi; Winner	(Austria) Valentina Cavallar; Arkéa–B&B Hotels Women; 2nd place	(Spain) Yurani Blanco; Laboral Kutxa–Fundación Euskadi; 3rd place	
28–30 June 2024	(Poland); Tour de Pologne Women	1	(Sweden) Stina Kagevi; Hitec Products–Fluid Control	(Finland) Wilma Aintila; Lotto–Intermarché Ladies	(Denmark) Christina Bragh; Danmark (national team)	
28–30 June 2024	(Poland); Tour de Pologne Women	2	(Netherlands) Laura Molenaar; VolkerWessels Cycling Team	(Poland) Katarzyna Wilkos; MAT Atom Deweloper Wrocław	(Netherlands) Scarlett Souren; VolkerWessels Cycling Team	
28–30 June 2024	(Poland); Tour de Pologne Women	3	(Netherlands) Scarlett Souren; VolkerWessels Cycling Team	(Netherlands) Anna Van Wersch; Lotto–Intermarché Ladies	Kaja Rysz; Poland (national team)	
28–30 June 2024	(Poland); Tour de Pologne Women	Overall	(Netherlands) Laura Molenaar; VolkerWessels Cycling Team; Winner	(Netherlands) Scarlett Souren; VolkerWessels Cycling Team; 2nd place	(Poland) Katarzyna Wilkos; MAT Atom Deweloper Wrocław; 3rd place	
3–7 July 2024	Volta a Portugal Feminina	1	(New Zealand) Michaela Drummond; Arkéa–B&B Hotels Women	(France) Maurène Trégouët; Arkéa–B&B Hotels Women	(France) India Grangier; Team Coop–Repsol	
3–7 July 2024	Volta a Portugal Feminina	2	(Canada) Mara Roldan; Cynisca Cycling	(United Kingdom) Francesca Hall; DAS–Hutchinson	(United States) Ashley Frye; Cynisca Cycling	
3–7 July 2024	Volta a Portugal Feminina	3	(New Zealand) Michaela Drummond; Arkéa–B&B Hotels Women	(France) India Grangier; Team Coop–Repsol	(France) Marie-Morgane le Deunff; Arkéa–B&B Hotels Women	
3–7 July 2024	Volta a Portugal Feminina	4	(France) India Grangier; Team Coop–Repsol	(France) Titia Ryo; Arkéa–B&B Hotels Women	(United States) Nicole Steinmetz; Cynisca Cycling	
3–7 July 2024	Volta a Portugal Feminina	5	(Sweden) Stina Kagevi; Team Coop–Repsol	(Portugal) Daniela Campos; Eneicat–CMTeam	(Norway) Sigrid Ytterhus Haugset; Team Coop–Repsol	
3–7 July 2024	Volta a Portugal Feminina	Overall	(France) India Grangier; Team Coop–Repsol; Winner	(France) Titia Ryo; Arkéa–B&B Hotels Women; 2nd place	(Portugal) Daniela Campos; Eneicat–CMTeam; 3rd place	
17–21 July 2024	(Belgium); Baloise Ladies Tour	Prologue	(Netherlands) Lorena Wiebes; Team SD Worx–Protime	(Belgium) Fien van Eynde; Fenix–Deceuninck	(Netherlands) Charlotte Kool; Team dsm–firmenich PostNL	
17–21 July 2024	(Belgium); Baloise Ladies Tour	1	(Netherlands) Lorena Wiebes; Team SD Worx–Protime	(Netherlands) Charlotte Kool; Team dsm–firmenich PostNL	(Italy) Rachele Barbieri; Team dsm–firmenich PostNL	
17–21 July 2024	(Belgium); Baloise Ladies Tour	2	(Netherlands) Charlotte Kool; Team dsm–firmenich PostNL	(Poland) Daria Pikulik; Human Powered Health	(Italy) Sara Fiorin; UAE Development Team	
17–21 July 2024	(Belgium); Baloise Ladies Tour	3a	(Netherlands) Lorena Wiebes; Team SD Worx–Protime	(Netherlands) Charlotte Kool; Team dsm–firmenich PostNL	(Poland) Daria Pikulik; Human Powered Health	
17–21 July 2024	(Belgium); Baloise Ladies Tour	3b	(Netherlands) Lorena Wiebes; Team SD Worx–Protime	(Belgium) Marion Norbert-Riberolle; Fenix–Deceuninck	(Netherlands) Thalita de Jong; Lotto–Dstny Ladies	
17–21 July 2024	(Belgium); Baloise Ladies Tour	4	(Netherlands) Lorena Wiebes; Team SD Worx–Protime	(Finland) Lotta Henttala; EF Education–EasyPost	(Netherlands) Charlotte Kool; Team dsm–firmenich PostNL	
17–21 July 2024	(Belgium); Baloise Ladies Tour	Overall	(Netherlands) Lorena Wiebes; Team SD Worx–Protime; Winner	(United Kingdom) Pfeiffer Georgi; Team dsm–firmenich PostNL; 2nd place	(Netherlands) Thalita de Jong; Lotto–Dstny Ladies; 3rd place	
25–28 July 2024	(Poland); Princess Anna Vasa Tour	1	(Netherlands) Visma–Lease a Bike; Carlijn Achtereekte; Mijntje Geurts; Lieke Nooijen; Margaux Vigie; Nienke Veenhoven; Riejanne Markus	(Poland) MAT Atom Deweloper Wrocław; Katarzyna Wilkos; Malwina Mul; Maja Tracka; Olga Wankiewicz; Martyna Szczęsna; Monika Brzeźna	(Netherlands) VolkerWessels Cycling Team; Scarlett Souren; Laura Molenaar; Sofie van Rooijen; Anneke Dijkstra; Marieke Meert; Meis Poland	
25–28 July 2024	(Poland); Princess Anna Vasa Tour	2	(Netherlands) Sofie van Rooijen; VolkerWessels Cycling Team	Karolina Kumięga; Poland (national team)	(Netherlands) Scarlett Souren; VolkerWessels Cycling Team	
25–28 July 2024	(Poland); Princess Anna Vasa Tour	3	(Netherlands) Lieke Nooijen; Visma–Lease a Bike	(Poland) Katarzyna Wilkos; MAT Atom Deweloper Wrocław	(Colombia) Juliana Londoño; WCC Team	
25–28 July 2024	(Poland); Princess Anna Vasa Tour	4	(Netherlands) Lieke Nooijen; Visma–Lease a Bike	(Netherlands) Riejanne Markus; Visma–Lease a Bike	(Netherlands) Carlijn Achtereekte; Visma–Lease a Bike	
25–28 July 2024	(Poland); Princess Anna Vasa Tour	Overall	(Netherlands) Lieke Nooijen; Visma–Lease a Bike; Winner	(Netherlands) Riejanne Markus; Visma–Lease a Bike; 2nd place	(Netherlands) Carlijn Achtereekte; Visma–Lease a Bike; 3rd place	
20–25 August 2024	Vuelta a Colombia Femenina	1	Elizabeth Castaño; Colombia Potencia de la Vida–Strongman	(Colombia) Diana Peñuela; DNA Pro Cycling	(Italy) Valentina Basilico; Eneicat–CMTeam	
20–25 August 2024	Vuelta a Colombia Femenina	2	Paula Carrasco; Colombia Potencia de la Vida–Strongman	María Latriglia; Colombia Potencia de la Vida–Strongman	(Colombia) Lorena Villamizar; Boneshaker Project presented by ROXO	
20–25 August 2024	Vuelta a Colombia Femenina	3	(Ecuador) Esther Galarza; PatoBike–Juquilita	(Colombia) Estefanía Herrera; Mujeres Ant-Org Paisa	(Venezuela) Lilibeth Chacón; PatoBike–Juquilita	
20–25 August 2024	Vuelta a Colombia Femenina	4	(Italy) Valentina Basilico; Eneicat–CMTeam	(New Zealand) Rylee McMullen; DNA Pro Cycling	(Bolivia) Floren Villanueva; Quici Sport – Escarabajos	
20–25 August 2024	Vuelta a Colombia Femenina	5	(Venezuela) Lilibeth Chacón; PatoBike–Juquilita	(Canada) Nadia Gontova; DNA Pro Cycling	(Spain) Ariana Gilabert; Eneicat–CMTeam	
20–25 August 2024	Vuelta a Colombia Femenina	6	(Portugal) Daniela Campos; Eneicat–CMTeam	(Canada) Nadia Gontova; DNA Pro Cycling	(Colombia) Lorena Villamizar; Boneshaker Project presented by ROXO	
20–25 August 2024	Vuelta a Colombia Femenina	Overall	(Venezuela) Lilibeth Chacón; PatoBike–Juquilita; Winner	(Canada) Nadia Gontova; DNA Pro Cycling; 2nd place	(Colombia) Estefanía Herrera; Mujeres Ant-Org Paisa; 3rd place	
21–24 August 2024	(France); Tour de l'Avenir Femmes	Prologue	Lore De Schepper; Belgium	Isabella Holmgren; Canada	Nienke Vinke; Netherlands	
21–24 August 2024	(France); Tour de l'Avenir Femmes	1	Marion Bunel; France	Isabella Holmgren; Canada	Lore De Schepper; Belgium	
21–24 August 2024	(France); Tour de l'Avenir Femmes	2	Églantine Rayer; France	Marie Schreiber; Luxembourg	(United Kingdom) Josie Nelson; Great Britain	
21–24 August 2024	(France); Tour de l'Avenir Femmes	3	Marion Bunel; France	Isabella Holmgren; Canada	Paula Blasi; Spain	
21–24 August 2024	(France); Tour de l'Avenir Femmes	Overall	(France) Marion Bunel; France; Winner	(Canada) Isabella Holmgren; Canada; 2nd place	(Spain) Eneritz Vadillo; Spain; 3rd place	
29 August – 1 September 2024	(Italy); Giro della Toscana Int. Femminile – Memorial Michela Fanini	Prologue	(Netherlands) Scarlett Souren; VolkerWessels Cycling Team	(Belgium) Marion Norbert-Riberolle; Fenix–Premier Tech Continental	(Denmark) Christina Bragh; Team Interklima ABC Copenhagen	
29 August – 1 September 2024	(Italy); Giro della Toscana Int. Femminile – Memorial Michela Fanini	1	(Lithuania) Rasa Leleivytė; Aromitalia Vaiano	(Italy) Elisa De Vallier; Top Girls Fassa Bortolo	(Belgium) Margot Vanpachtenbeke; VolkerWessels Cycling Team	
29 August – 1 September 2024	(Italy); Giro della Toscana Int. Femminile – Memorial Michela Fanini	2	(Belgium) Margot Vanpachtenbeke; VolkerWessels Cycling Team	(Lithuania) Rasa Leleivytė; Aromitalia Vaiano	(Ukraine) Olha Kulynych; Fenix–Premier Tech Continental	
29 August – 1 September 2024	(Italy); Giro della Toscana Int. Femminile – Memorial Michela Fanini	3	(Lithuania) Rasa Leleivytė; Aromitalia Vaiano	(Belgium) Margot Vanpachtenbeke; VolkerWessels Cycling Team	(Ukraine) Olha Kulynych; Fenix–Premier Tech Continental	
29 August – 1 September 2024	(Italy); Giro della Toscana Int. Femminile – Memorial Michela Fanini	Overall	(Belgium) Margot Vanpachtenbeke; VolkerWessels Cycling Team; Winner	(Lithuania) Rasa Leleivytė; Aromitalia Vaiano; 2nd place	(Ukraine) Olha Kulynych; Fenix–Premier Tech Continental; 3rd place	
3–8 September 2024	(France); Tour Cycliste Féminin International de l'Ardèche	1	(Netherlands) Thalita de Jong; Lotto–Dstny Ladies	(Poland) Karolina Perekitko; Winspace	(Italy) Debora Silvestri; Laboral Kutxa–Fundación Euskadi	
3–8 September 2024	(France); Tour Cycliste Féminin International de l'Ardèche	2	(Netherlands) Thalita de Jong; Lotto–Dstny Ladies	(Canada) Sarah Van Dam; DNA Pro Cycling	(Netherlands) Eline Jansen; VolkerWessels Cycling Team	
3–8 September 2024	(France); Tour Cycliste Féminin International de l'Ardèche	3	(Netherlands) Nina Buijsman; FDJ–Suez	(Spain) Usoa Ostolaza; Laboral Kutxa–Fundación Euskadi	(Canada) Nadia Gontova; DNA Pro Cycling	
3–8 September 2024	(France); Tour Cycliste Féminin International de l'Ardèche	4	(France) Maëva Squiban; Arkéa–B&B Hotels Women	(Poland) Dominika Włodarczyk; UAE Team ADQ Development Team	(Netherlands) Nina Buijsman; FDJ–Suez	
3–8 September 2024	(France); Tour Cycliste Féminin International de l'Ardèche	5	(Afghanistan) Fariba Hashimi; WCC Team	(Poland) Dominika Włodarczyk; UAE Team ADQ Development Team	(Netherlands) Thalita de Jong; Lotto–Dstny Ladies	
3–8 September 2024	(France); Tour Cycliste Féminin International de l'Ardèche	6	(Netherlands) Eline Jansen; VolkerWessels Cycling Team	(Italy) Letizia Borghesi; EF Education–Cannondale	(France) Maëva Squiban; Arkéa–B&B Hotels Women	
3–8 September 2024	(France); Tour Cycliste Féminin International de l'Ardèche	Overall	(Netherlands) Thalita de Jong; Lotto–Dstny Ladies; Winner	(France) Marion Bunel; St. Michel–Mavic–Auber93; 2nd place	(Italy) Monica Trinca Colonel; Bepink–Bongioanni; 3rd place	
21–22 September 2024	(Belgium); Tour de la Semois	1	(United Kingdom) Cat Ferguson; Movistar Team	(France) Maëva Squiban; Arkéa–B&B Hotels Women	Karlijn Swinkels (NED); UAE Team ADQ Development	
21–22 September 2024	(Belgium); Tour de la Semois	2	(Netherlands) Thalita de Jong; Lotto–Dstny Ladies	(Netherlands) Karlijn Swinkels; UAE Team ADQ Development	(Netherlands) Mareille Meijering; Movistar Team	
21–22 September 2024	(Belgium); Tour de la Semois	Overall	(Netherlands) Karlijn Swinkels; UAE Team ADQ Development; Winner	(Netherlands) Thalita de Jong; Lotto–Dstny Ladies; 2nd place	(France) Maëva Squiban; Arkéa–B&B Hotels Women; 3rd place	
17– October 2024	Vuelta Internacional Femenina a Costa Rica	1	(Colombia) Katherin Montoya; Boneshaker Project p/b Orange Seal	(Colombia) Milena Salcedo; Pato Bike BMC Team	(Mexico) Andrea Ramírez; Boneshaker Project p/b Orange Seal	
17– October 2024	Vuelta Internacional Femenina a Costa Rica	2	(Colombia) Milena Salcedo; Pato Bike BMC Team	(Colombia) Lorena Villamizar; Boneshaker Project p/b Orange Seal	(Ecuador) Esther Galarza; Pato Bike BMC Team	
17– October 2024	Vuelta Internacional Femenina a Costa Rica	3	(Ecuador) Esther Galarza; Pato Bike BMC Team	(Guatemala) Gabriela Soto; Macizo GW Banrural	(Colombia) Lorena Villamizar; Boneshaker Project p/b Orange Seal	
17– October 2024	Vuelta Internacional Femenina a Costa Rica	4	(Colombia) Lina Maria Rojas; Pato Bike BMC Team	(Mexico) Andrea Ramírez; Boneshaker Project p/b Orange Seal	Marcela Itzae Peñafiel; Best PC Ecuador	
17– October 2024	Vuelta Internacional Femenina a Costa Rica	Overall	(Ecuador) Esther Galarza; Pato Bike BMC Team; Winner	(Guatemala) Gabriela Soto; Macizo GW Banrural; 2nd place	(Colombia) Lorena Villamizar; Boneshaker Project p/b Orange Seal; 3rd place	

== Junior races ==
Race	Date	Cat. †	Winner	Second	Third	Ref
(Australia) Australian Junior Criterium National Championships	5 January 2024	1.WJ	(Australia) Nicole Duncan; Team BridgeLane	(Australia) Anna Dubier	(Australia) Scarlett Sibbel	
New Zealand Junior Criterium National Championships	22 January 2024	1.WJ	(New Zealand) Ava Maddison; Black Magic Women's Cycling	(New Zealand) Alex Rawlinson; Black Magic Women's Cycling	(New Zealand) Elena Worrall	
(Turkey) International Kleopatra Beach Criterium	24 February 2024	1.WJ	(Turkey) Sude Nur Satıcı	(Turkey) Nilsu Karasay	(Turkey) Esma Duman	
(Spain) Errenteriako Ane Santesteban Txirrindulari Saria	25 February 2024	1.WJ	Ainhoa Sanz (ESP)	Intza Navarro (ESP)	Irati Michelena (ESP)	
(Turkey) International Alanya Castle Criterium	3 March 2024	1.WJ	(Turkey) Yaren Yaman	(Turkey) Gizem Tamer	(Turkey) Esma Duman	
(Spain) GP Cantabria Deporte	3 March 2024	1.WJ	Paula Ostiz Taco (ESP)	Florencia Revetria (URU)	Izaro Etxarri (ESP)	
(Belgium) De Klijte	3 March 2024	1.WJ	Anna Lloyd (GBR)	Lien Schampaert (BEL)	Eline De Winter (BEL)	
(Italy) Trofeo Tecnomeccanica Donne Junior	3 March 2024	1.WJ	Linda Sanarini (ITA)	Chantal Pegolo (ITA)	Virginia Iaccarino (ITA)	
(Netherlands) Adsteeg Omloop Beek	3 March 2024	1.WJ	Auke De Buysser (BEL)	Fee Knaven (NED)	Alexandra Volstad (CAN)	
(Belgium) Beernem	10 March 2024	1.NE	Auke De Buysser (BEL)	Alexandra Volstad (CAN)	Isere Koster (NED)	
(Italy) Trofeo Città di Nonantola	10 March 2024	1.WJ	Erja Giulia Bianchi (ITA)	Asia Sgaravato (ITA)	Matilde Cenci (ITA)	
(Italy) Piccolo Trofeo Alfredo Binda	17 March 2024	1.NcupWJ	Imogen Wolff (GBR)	Cat Ferguson (GBR)	Auke De Buysser (BEL)	
(Netherlands) Tijdrit Biddinghuizen	17 March 2024	1.WJ	Benedicte Heinsman (NED)	Noï Moes (NED)	Viivi Turpeinen (FIN)	
(Italy) Trofeo Vini Terre Gaie	24 March 2024	1.WJ	Marta Grassi (ITA)	Ginevra Sambi (ITA)	Sveva Bertolucci (ITA)	
(Italy) ASD Ciclismo Buttrio	24 March 2024	1.WJ	Alessia Zambelli (ITA)	Chantal Pegolo (ITA)	Giada Silo (ITA)	
(Netherlands) Bergomloop Berg en Terblijt	24 March 2024	1.WJ	Megan Arens (NED)	Fee Knaven (NED)	Roxanne Takken (NED)	
(Italy) Trofeo Rosa Città di Cantù	March 2024	1.WJ				
(Netherlands) Ronde van de Uithof	30 March 2024	1.WJ	Mirthe Boneschansker (NED)	Sveva Klok (NED)	Emilie Fransen (NED)	
(Belgium) Gent-Wevelgem	21 April 2024	1.1	Amelia Cebak (GBR)	Rebecca Gardiner (GBR)	Amalia Debarges (FRA)	

== Junior races (2.NCup) ==
Race	Date	Cat. †	Winner	Second	Third	Ref
19–21 April 2024	(Netherlands); EPZ Omloop van Borsele	1	(United Kingdom) Cat Ferguson	(France) Célia Gery	(Netherlands) Fee Knaven	
19–21 April 2024	(Netherlands); EPZ Omloop van Borsele	2	(United Kingdom) Carys Lloyd	(United Kingdom) Cat Ferguson	(Belgium) Auke De Buysser	
19–21 April 2024	(Netherlands); EPZ Omloop van Borsele	3	(United Kingdom) Carys Lloyd	(United Kingdom) Cat Ferguson	(Denmark) Mathilde Cramer	
19–21 April 2024	(Netherlands); EPZ Omloop van Borsele	Overall	(United Kingdom) Cat Ferguson; Winner	(France) Célia Gery; 2nd place	(Netherlands) Fee Knaven; 3rd place	
30 August – 1 September 2024	(Netherlands); Watersley Ladies Challenge	1	(France) Célia Gery	(Republic of Ireland) Lucy Bénézet Minns	(Spain) Paula Ostiz	
30 August – 1 September 2024	(Netherlands); Watersley Ladies Challenge	2	(France) Célia Gery	(Belgium) Auke De Buysser	(Spain) Paula Ostiz	
30 August – 1 September 2024	(Netherlands); Watersley Ladies Challenge	3	(Netherlands) Puck Langenbarg	(Spain) Paula Ostiz	(United Kingdom) Esther Wong	
30 August – 1 September 2024	(Netherlands); Watersley Ladies Challenge	Overall	(Spain) Paula Ostiz; Winner	(Netherlands) Puck Langenbarg; 2nd place	(United Kingdom) Esther Wong; 3rd place	

== Continental championships ==
Championships	Race	Winner	Second	Third
Arab Road Cycling Championships; Saudi Arabia 17–23 December 2023 (2024 summary)	Road race	Ebtissam Mohamed (EGY)	Nesrine Houili (ALG)	Yasmine El Meddah (ALG)
Arab Road Cycling Championships; Saudi Arabia 17–23 December 2023 (2024 summary)	Individual time trial	Ebtissam Mohamed (EGY)	Dahat Qadr (IRQ)	Khadidja Araoui (ALG)
Arab Road Cycling Championships; Saudi Arabia 17–23 December 2023 (2024 summary)	Individual time trial (U23)	Nesrine Houili (ALG)	Zahra Hussain (UAE)	Salma Hariri (MAR)
Arab Road Cycling Championships; Saudi Arabia 17–23 December 2023 (2024 summary)	Road race (Junior)	Siham Bousba (ALG)	Marwa Kahwar (UAE)	Lanya Sabir (IRQ)
Arab Road Cycling Championships; Saudi Arabia 17–23 December 2023 (2024 summary)	Individual time trial (Junior)	Siham Bousba (ALG)	Marwa Kahwar (UAE)	Alaliaa Darwish (EGY)
Arab Road Cycling Championships; Saudi Arabia 17–23 December 2023 (2024 summary)	Team Time Trial	Algeria (ALG); Nesrine Houili; Yasmine El Meddah; Khadidja Araoui; Imene Maldji	Saudi Arabia (KSA); Monirah Aldraiweesh; Fatima Aleisa; Razan Zadah; Hind Basuwitin	
Arab Road Cycling Championships; Saudi Arabia 17–23 December 2023 (2024 summary)	Junior Team Time Trial	Algeria (ALG); Yamna Bouyacor; Siham Bousba; Mechab Malik; Hanine Belatrous	Tunisia (TUN); Emna Mootamed; Brini Mariem; Alma Abroud; Chehaibi Yassmine	United Arab Emirates (UAE); Marwa Kahwar; Alia Ali; Ranad Alyafei
Oceania Road Cycling Championships; Australia 12–14 April 2024 (2024 summary)	Road race	Katelyn Nicholson (AUS)	Keely Bennett (AUS)	Haylee Fuller (AUS)
Oceania Road Cycling Championships; Australia 12–14 April 2024 (2024 summary)	Individual time trial	Isabelle Carnes (AUS)	Katelyn Nicholson (AUS)	Maddison Taylor (AUS)
Oceania Road Cycling Championships; Australia 12–14 April 2024 (2024 summary)	U23 Individual time trial	Sophia Sammons (AUS)	Talia Appleton (AUS)	Haylee Fuller (AUS)
Oceania Road Cycling Championships; Australia 12–14 April 2024 (2024 summary)	Road race (Junior)	Lauren Bates (AUS)	Kirsty Watts (NZL)	Alex Rawlinson (NZL)
Oceania Road Cycling Championships; Australia 12–14 April 2024 (2024 summary)	Individual time trial (Junior)	Lilyth Jones (AUS)	Kirsty Watts (NZL)	Nicole Duncan (AUS)
Pan American Cycling Championships; Brazil 21–24 May 2024 (2024 summary)	Road race	Lauren Stephens (USA)	Wellyda Rodrigues (BRA)	Catalina Soto (CHI)
Pan American Cycling Championships; Brazil 21–24 May 2024 (2024 summary)	Individual time trial	Amber Neben (USA)	Lauren Stephens (USA)	Aranza Villalón (CHI)
Pan American Cycling Championships; Brazil 21–24 May 2024 (2024 summary)	Road race (Junior)	Luciana Osorio (COL)	Javiera Mansilla (CHI)	Florencia Revetria (URU)
Pan American Cycling Championships; Brazil 21–24 May 2024 (2024 summary)	Individual time trial (Junior)	Luciana Osorio (COL)	Natalie Revelo (ECU)	María Fernanda Torres (CHI)
Asian Cycling Championships; Kazakhstan 5–12 June 2024 (2024 summary)	Road race	Song Min-ji (KOR)	Thị Thật Nguyễn (VIE)	Tang Xin (CHN)
Asian Cycling Championships; Kazakhstan 5–12 June 2024 (2024 summary)	Individual time trial	Olga Zabelinskaya (UZB)	Yanina Kuskova (UZB)	Rinata Sultanova (KAZ)
Asian Cycling Championships; Kazakhstan 5–12 June 2024 (2024 summary)	Individual time trial (U23)	Hongyang He (CHN)	Dewika Mulya Sova (INA)	Akpeiil Ossim (KAZ)
Asian Cycling Championships; Kazakhstan 5–12 June 2024 (2024 summary)	Road race (Junior)	Shang Ying Liu (TPE)	Angelina Burenkova (KAZ)	Yevgeniya Zaam (KAZ)
Asian Cycling Championships; Kazakhstan 5–12 June 2024 (2024 summary)	Individual time trial (Junior)	Mariya Yelkina (KAZ)	Samira Ismailova (UZB)	Harshita Jakhar (IND)
Asian Cycling Championships; Kazakhstan 5–12 June 2024 (2024 summary)	Women's Mixed Team Time Trial Relay	Kazakhstan (KAZ); Rinata Sultanova; Makhabbat Umutzhanova; Faina Potapova	Uzbekistan (UZB); Olga Zabelinskaya; Yanina Kuskova; Margarita Misyurina	Hong Kong (HKG); Lee Sze Wing; Leung Bo Yee; Wing Yee Leung
Asian Cycling Championships; Kazakhstan 5–12 June 2024 (2024 summary)	Junior Mixed Team Time Trial Relay	Kazakhstan (KAZ); Ekaterina Udovykina; Yevgeniya Zaam; Angelina Burenkova	Uzbekistan (UZB); Samira Ismailova; Viktoriya Polzunova; Madina Davronova	Thailand (THA); Pittayapron Seatun; Natacha Songken; Suphannika Chantorn
European Road Cycling Championships; Belgium 11–15 September 2024 (2024 summary)	Road race	Lorena Wiebes (NED)	Elisa Balsamo (ITA)	Daria Pikulik (POL)
European Road Cycling Championships; Belgium 11–15 September 2024 (2024 summary)	Individual time trial	Lotte Kopecky (BEL)	Ellen van Dijk (NED)	Christina Schweinberger (AUT)
European Road Cycling Championships; Belgium 11–15 September 2024 (2024 summary)	Road race (U23)	Sofie van Rooijen (NED)	Scarlett Souren (NED)	Eleonora Gasparrini (ITA)
European Road Cycling Championships; Belgium 11–15 September 2024 (2024 summary)	Individual time trial (U23)	Anniina Ahtosalo (FIN)	Antonia Niedermaier (GER)	Marie Schreiber (LUX)
European Road Cycling Championships; Belgium 11–15 September 2024 (2024 summary)	Road race (Junior)	Puck Langenbarg (NED)	Messane Bräutigam (GER)	Štěpánka Dubcová (CZE)
European Road Cycling Championships; Belgium 11–15 September 2024 (2024 summary)	Individual time trial (Junior)	Paula Ostiz (ESP)	Fee Knaven (NED)	Viktória Chladoňová (SVK)
European Road Cycling Championships; Belgium 11–15 September 2024 (2024 summary)	Mixed Team Time Trial Relay	Italy (ITA); Mattia Cattaneo; Elena Cecchini; Vittoria Guazzini; Mirco Maestri; Gaia Masetti; Edoardo Affini	Germany (GER); Jannik Steimle; Max Walscheid; Nils Politt; Mieke Kröger; Franziska Koch; Lisa Klein	Belgium (BEL); Alana Castrique; Marion Norbert-Riberolle; Noah Vandenbranden; Victor Vercouillie; Jesse Vandenbulcke; Edward Theuns
European Road Cycling Championships; Belgium 11–15 September 2024 (2024 summary)	Junior Mixed Team Time Trial Relay	Netherlands (NED); Sara Sonnemans; Jente Koops; Joeri Schaper; Roos Müller; Gijs Schoonvelde; Michiel Mouris	Germany (GER); Messane Bräutigam; Paul Fietzke; Ian Kings; Magdalena Leis; Joelle Amelie Messemer; Paul-Felix Petry	Norway (NOR); Mia Kronheim Gjertsen; Felix Ørn-Kristoff; Matilde Skjelde; Andreas Flaatten; Marius Innhaug Dahl; Kamilla Aasebø
African Road Championships; Kenya 9– October 2024 (2024 summary)	Road race	Ashleigh Moolman Pasio (RSA)	Adiam Dawit (ERI)	Diane Ingabire (RWA)
African Road Championships; Kenya 9– October 2024 (2024 summary)	Individual time trial	Lucy Young (RSA)	Ashleigh Moolman Pasio (RSA)	Melissa Hinz (NAM)
African Road Championships; Kenya 9– October 2024 (2024 summary)	Individual time trial (U23)	Suzana Fisehaye (ERI)	Adiam Dawit (ERI)	Gebregzabiher Mieraf Aregawi (ETH)
African Road Championships; Kenya 9– October 2024 (2024 summary)	Road race (Junior)	Nardos Tsegay (ERI)	Nantume Miria (UGA)	Eldana Bereket (ERI)
African Road Championships; Kenya 9– October 2024 (2024 summary)	Individual time trial (Junior)	Betiel Efrem (ERI)	Alaliaa Darwish (EGY)	Kahsay Tsige Kiros (ETH)
African Road Championships; Kenya 9– October 2024 (2024 summary)	Mixed Team Time Trial Relay	Rwanda (RWA); Diane Ingabire; Valentine Nzayisenga; Josiane Mukashema; Vainqueur Masengesho; Etienne Tuyizere; Moise Mugisha	Eritrea (ERI); Hebron Berhane; Milkias Maekele; Meron Teshome; Adiam Dawit; Milena Gebrekrstos; Suzana Fisehaye	Ethiopia (ETH); Gebregzabiher Mieraf Aregawi; Hadush Merhawit Asgodom; Serkalen Taye Watango; Negasi Haylu Abreha; Gereziher Geremedhin Hailemaryam; Kiya Rogora

== Others ==
Championships	Race	Winner	Second	Third
2023 African Games; Ghana 9 and 14 March 2024 (2024 summary)	Road race	Hayley Preen (RSA)	Aurelie Halbwachs (MRI)	Ese Ukpeseraye (NGR)
2023 African Games; Ghana 9 and 14 March 2024 (2024 summary)	Road race U23	Adiam Dawit (ERI)	Anika Visser (RSA)	Ksanet Weldemikeal Teages (ERI)
2023 African Games; Ghana 9 and 14 March 2024 (2024 summary)	Individual time trial	Aurelie Halbwachs (MRI)	Ese Ukpeseraye (NGR)	Lucy Young (RSA)
2023 African Games; Ghana 9 and 14 March 2024 (2024 summary)	Individual time trial U23	Nesrine Houili (ALG)	Adiam Dawit (ERI)	Monalisa Araya (ERI)
2023 African Games; Ghana 9 and 14 March 2024 (2024 summary)	Criterium	Hayley Preen (RSA)	Anri Greeff (NAM)	Diane Ingabire (RWA)
2023 African Games; Ghana 9 and 14 March 2024 (2024 summary)	Team time trial	Eritrea; Adiam Dawit; Birikti Fessehaye; Monalisa Araya; Suzana Fisehaye	South Africa; Hayley Preen; Sonica Klopper; Anika Visser	Mauritius; Lucie de Marigny-Lagesse; Aurelie Halbwachs; Raphaëlle Lamusse
2023 African Games; Ghana 9 and 14 March 2024 (2024 summary)	Mixed Team time trial	Mauritius; Aurelien de Comarmond; Lucie de Marigny-Lagesse; Aurelie Halbwachs; Raphaëlle Lamusse; Alexandre Mayer; Christopher Lagane	South Africa; Brandon Downes; Dillon Geary; Blaine Kieck; Sonica Klopper; Anika Visser; Lucy Young	Eritrea; Birikti Fessehaye; Suzana Fisehaye; Merhawi Kudus; Adiam Dawit; Dawit Yemane; Nahom Zerai
2024 Bolivarian Youth Games; Bolivia 4–14 April 2024 (2024 summary)	Road race	Luciana Osorio (COL)	Marlén Rojas (CHI)	Manuela Cantor (COL)
2024 Bolivarian Youth Games; Bolivia 4–14 April 2024 (2024 summary)	Time trial	Luciana Osorio (COL)	Natalie Revelo (ECU)	Marlén Rojas (CHI)

== National champions ==
Date	Venue	Podium (Road Race)		Team	Podium (ITT)	Team
3–7 January 2024	Australia; Buninyong	1	Ruby Roseman-Gannon	Liv AlUla Jayco	Grace Brown	FDJ–Suez
3–7 January 2024	Australia; Buninyong	2	Lauretta Hanson	Lidl–Trek	Brodie Chapman	Lidl–Trek
3–7 January 2024	Australia; Buninyong	3	Alexandra Manly	Liv AlUla Jayco	Georgie Howe	Liv AlUla Jayco
9–11 January 2024	India; Bijapur	1	Swasti Singh		Monika Jat	
9–11 January 2024	India; Bijapur	2	Soumya Antapur		Pranita Soman	
9–11 January 2024	India; Bijapur	3	Ranjita Ghorpade		Kavita Siyag	
20–21 January 2024	Thailand	1	Phetdarin Somrat	Thailand Women's Cycling Team	Phetdarin Somrat	Thailand Women's Cycling Team
20–21 January 2024	Thailand	2	Chaniporn Batriya	Thailand Women's Cycling Team	Rungnapha Kuson	
20–21 January 2024	Thailand	3	Kamonrada Khaoplot		Chaniporn Batriya	Thailand Women's Cycling Team
25–26 January 2024	Colombia	1	Paula Patiño	Movistar Team	Diana Peñuela	DNA Pro Cycling
25–26 January 2024	Colombia	2	Diana Peñuela	DNA Pro Cycling	Karen Villamizar	Boneshaker Project presented by ROXO
25–26 January 2024	Colombia	3	Jessenia Meneses	Laboral Kutxa–Fundación Euskadi	Ana Sanabria	
26–28 January 2024	Namibia	1	Vera Looser		Vera Looser	
26–28 January 2024	Namibia	2	Melissa Hinz		Melissa Hinz	
26–28 January 2024	Namibia	3	Anri Greeff		Anri Greeff	
1–3 February 2024	Ecuador	1	Miryam Núñez	Primeau Velo Racing	Miryam Núñez	Primeau Velo Racing
1–3 February 2024	Ecuador	2	Esther Galarza		Esther Galarza	
1–3 February 2024	Ecuador	3	Elizabeth Bravo		María Paula Pazmiño	MEB Liv Toscana
2–4 February 2024	South Africa	1	Carla Oberholzer		Hayley Preen	
2–4 February 2024	South Africa	2	Hayley Preen		Emma Pallant	
2–4 February 2024	South Africa	3	S'annara Grove	O'Shea Redchilli Bikes	Lucy Young	
6–8 February 2024	Philippines	1	Mathilda Krog		Jermyn Prado	
6–8 February 2024	Philippines	2	Wenizah Claire Vinoya		Phoebe Salazar	
6–8 February 2024	Philippines	3	Raven Joy Valdez		Shagne Yao	
8–10 February 2024	New Zealand	1	Ella Wyllie	Liv AlUla Jayco	Kim Cadzow	EF Education–EasyPost
8–10 February 2024	New Zealand	2	Kim Cadzow	EF Education–EasyPost	Mikayla Harvey	UAE Team ADQ
8–10 February 2024	New Zealand	3	Sammie Maxwell		Kate McCarthy	
26–28 February 2024	Pakistan	1	Bisma Choudhury			
26–28 February 2024	Pakistan	2	Tayyaba			
26–28 February 2024	Pakistan	3	Rimsha			
1–2 March 2024	Bahrain	1	Fatima Murad		Fatima Murad	
1–2 March 2024	Bahrain	2				
1–2 March 2024	Bahrain	3				
8–10 March 2024	Malaysia	1	Nur Fitrah Shaari			
8–10 March 2024	Malaysia	2	Jupha Somnet			
8–10 March 2024	Malaysia	3	Phi Kun Pan			
6–7 April 2024	Paraguay	1	Sonia Olmedo		Araceli Galeano	
6–7 April 2024	Paraguay	2	Susana Andrea Guillén		Sonia Olmedo	
6–7 April 2024	Paraguay	3	Jule Lena Michaelis		Susana Andrea Guillén	
6–7 June 2024	Angola	1	Carla Araújo		Yolanda Mendes	
6–7 June 2024	Angola	2	Yolanda Mendes		Carla Araújo	
6–7 June 2024	Angola	3	Megan Brechet		Megan Brechet	
13–15 June 2024	Eritrea	1				
13–15 June 2024	Eritrea	2				
13–15 June 2024	Eritrea	3				
14–16 June 2024	Finland	1	Anniina Ahtosalo	Uno-X Mobility	Anniina Ahtosalo	Uno-X Mobility
14–16 June 2024	Finland	2	Wilma Aintila	Lotto–Dstny Ladies	Essi Pelto-Arvo	
14–16 June 2024	Finland	3	Ursula Lindén	Baloise-WB Ladies	Ruska Saarela	
15–21 June 2024	Bulgaria	1	Ivana Tonkova		Gergana Stoyanova	Cycling Team Palashev
15–21 June 2024	Bulgaria	2	Gergana Stoyanova		Petya Minkova	
15–21 June 2024	Bulgaria	3	Petya Minkova		Iveta Kostadinova	
15–21 June 2024	Lithuania	1	Olivija Baleišytė	Aromitalia 3T Vaiano	Olivija Baleišytė	Aromitalia 3T Vaiano
15–21 June 2024	Lithuania	2	Akvilė Gedraitytė	Dubai Police Cycling Team	Skaistė Mikašauskaitė	
15–21 June 2024	Lithuania	3	Daiva Ragažinskienė		Eglė Dubauskaitė	
15–23 June 2024	Netherlands	1	Chantal van den Broek-Blaak	Team SD Worx–Protime	Riejanne Markus	Visma–Lease a Bike
15–23 June 2024	Netherlands	2	Mischa Bredewold	Team SD Worx–Protime	Lieke Nooijen	Visma–Lease a Bike
15–23 June 2024	Netherlands	3	Nina Kessler	EF Education–EasyPost	Demi Vollering	Team SD Worx–Protime
16–23 June 2024	Guatemala	1	Gabriela Soto		Gabriela Soto	
16–23 June 2024	Guatemala	2	Lidia Inay		Cintia Lee	
16–23 June 2024	Guatemala	3	Valeska Gómez		Fátima Cristales	
16–23 June 2024	Mauritius	1	Kimberley Le Court	AG Insurance–Soudal	Kimberley Le Court	AG Insurance–Soudal
16–23 June 2024	Mauritius	2	Raphaëlle Lamusse		Nadine van Rensburg	
16–23 June 2024	Mauritius	3	Julie Staub		Noemie Marie Shania Martin	
17–22 June 2024	China	1	Hao Zhang		Jia Sun	
17–22 June 2024	China	2	Wei Qianqian		Sun Yuqing	
17–22 June 2024	China	3	Luyao Zeng		Yan Sheng	
18–19 June 2024	Cuba	1	Arlenis Sierra	Movistar Team	Arlenis Sierra	Movistar Team
18–19 June 2024	Cuba	2	Daymelín Pérez		Daymelín Pérez	
18–19 June 2024	Cuba	3	Eylin Delgado		Mailen Ramos	
18–22 June 2024	Estonia	1	Laura Lizette Sander	AG Insurance–NXTG U23 Team	Laura Lizette Sander	AG Insurance–NXTG U23 Team
18–22 June 2024	Estonia	2	Elisabeth Ebras	UAE Development Team	Elisabeth Ebras	UAE Development Team
18–22 June 2024	Estonia	3	Kristel Sandra Soonik	Keukens Redant Cycling Team	Aidi Gerde Tuisk	Team Coop–Repsol
18–23 June 2024	Sweden	1	Mika Söderström		Lisa Nordén	
18–23 June 2024	Sweden	2	Matilda Frantzich	Team Sydbank BACH Advokater	Ebba Granqvist	
18–23 June 2024	Sweden	3	Clara Lundmark	Hess Cycling Team	Stina Kagevi	Team Coop–Repsol
18–23 June 2024	Ukraine	1	Olga Shekel		Yuliia Biriukova	Human Powered Health
18–23 June 2024	Ukraine	2	Maryna Altukhova		Valeriya Kononenko	
18–23 June 2024	Ukraine	3	Valeriya Kononenko		Tetiana Yashchenko	
18–25 June 2024	Mongolia	1	Enkhjin Gantogtokh		Anujin Jinjiibadam	
18–25 June 2024	Mongolia	2	Anujin Jinjiibadam		Solongo Tserenlkham	
18–25 June 2024	Mongolia	3	Solongo Tserenlkham		Enkhmaa Enkhtur	
19–23 June 2024	Latvia	1	Anastasia Carbonari	UAE Team ADQ	Kitija Siltumēna	Keukens Redant Cycling Team
19–23 June 2024	Latvia	2	Kitija Siltumēna	Keukens Redant Cycling Team	Krista Pūcīte	
19–23 June 2024	Latvia	3	Laura Belohvoščika		Madara Āboma	
19–23 June 2024	United Kingdom	1	Pfeiffer Georgi	Team dsm–firmenich PostNL	Anna Henderson	Visma–Lease a Bike
19–23 June 2024	United Kingdom	2	Anna Henderson	Visma–Lease a Bike	Claire Steels	Movistar Team
19–23 June 2024	United Kingdom	3	Lizzie Deignan	Lidl–Trek	Elinor Barker	Uno-X Mobility
19–23 June 2024	Poland	1	Dominika Włodarczyk	UAE Team ADQ	Marta Jaskulska	Ceratizit–WNT Pro Cycling
19–23 June 2024	Poland	2	Marta Jaskulska	Ceratizit–WNT Pro Cycling	Marta Lach	Ceratizit–WNT Pro Cycling
19–23 June 2024	Poland	3	Zuzanna Chylińska	TKK Pacific Nestlé Fitness	Agnieszka Skalniak-Sójka	Canyon//SRAM
19–23 June 2024	Kazakhstan	1	Rinata Sultanova		Rinata Sultanova	
19–23 June 2024	Kazakhstan	2	Violetta Kazakova	Astana Dewi Women Team	Akpeiil Ossim	
19–23 June 2024	Kazakhstan	3	Yelizaveta Sklyarova	Born to Win BTC City Ljubljana Zhiraf	Makhabbat Umutzhanova	
19–30 June 2024	Hungary	1	Blanka Vas	Team SD Worx–Protime	Petra Zsankó	RC ARBÖ-ASKÖ Rapso Knittelfeld
19–30 June 2024	Hungary	2	Petra Zsankó	RC ARBÖ-ASKÖ Rapso Knittelfeld	Johanna Borissza	
19–30 June 2024	Hungary	3	Szonja Greman		Fanni Hajdu	
19–30 June 2024	Italy	1	Elisa Longo Borghini	Lidl–Trek	Vittoria Guazzini	FDJ–Suez
19–30 June 2024	Italy	2	Chiara Consonni	UAE Team ADQ	Elisa Longo Borghini	Lidl–Trek
19–30 June 2024	Italy	3	Eleonora Gasparrini	UAE Team ADQ	Elena Pirrone	Roland
20–22 June 2024	Zimbabwe	1	Skye Davidson	Jadan Vive le Velo	Skye Davidson	Jadan Vive le Velo
20–22 June 2024	Zimbabwe	2	Andie Kuipers		Helen Mitchell	
20–22 June 2024	Zimbabwe	3	Faith Tuhwe		Faith Tuhwe	
20–23 June 2024	Ireland	1	Fiona Mangan	Cynisca Cycling	Fiona Mangan	Cynisca Cycling
20–23 June 2024	Ireland	2	Grace Reynolds	Brother UK - Orientation Marketing	Annalise Murphy	
20–23 June 2024	Ireland	3	Lara Gillespie	UAE Development Team	Roisin Thomas	
20–23 June 2024	Bermuda	1	Gabriella Arnold	LA Sweat	Liana Medeiros	
20–23 June 2024	Bermuda	2	Panzy Olander		Panzy Olander	
20–23 June 2024	Bermuda	3	Liana Medeiros			
20–23 June 2024	Czech Republic	1	Barbora Němcová	Team Dukla Praha	Julia Kopecký	AG Insurance–NXTG U23 Team
20–23 June 2024	Czech Republic	2	Nikola Bajgerová	MAT Atom Deweloper Wrocław	Nikola Nosková	Cofidis
20–23 June 2024	Czech Republic	3	Julia Kopecký	AG Insurance–NXTG U23 Team	Jana Milec-Jiřincová	
20–23 June 2024	Norway	1	Mie Bjørndal Ottestad	Uno-X Mobility	Katrine Aalerud	Uno-X Mobility
20–23 June 2024	Norway	2	Emma Dyrhovden		Mie Bjørndal Ottestad	Uno-X Mobility
20–23 June 2024	Norway	3	Katrine Aalerud	Uno-X Mobility	Sigrid Ytterhus Haugset	Team Coop–Repsol
20–23 June 2024	Slovenia	1	Urška Žigart	Liv AlUla Jayco	Urška Žigart	Liv AlUla Jayco
20–23 June 2024	Slovenia	2	Urša Pintar	Born to Win BTC City Ljubljana Zhiraf	Hana Žumer	Born to Win BTC City Ljubljana Zhiraf
20–23 June 2024	Slovenia	3	Špela Kern	Cofidis	Ema Pirš	Born to Win BTC City Ljubljana Zhiraf
20–23 June 2024	Dominican Republic	1	Flor Espiritusanto Estévez		Flor Espiritusanto Estévez	
20–23 June 2024	Dominican Republic	2	Gabriella Tejada Batista		Ana Guzmán Castillo	
20–23 June 2024	Dominican Republic	3	Ana Guzmán Castillo		Yanilka Seara Vega Polanco	
20–23 June 2024	France	1	Juliette Labous	Team dsm–firmenich PostNL	Audrey Cordon-Ragot	Human Powered Health
20–23 June 2024	France	2	Gladys Verhulst	FDJ–Suez	Cédrine Kerbaol	Ceratizit–WNT Pro Cycling
20–23 June 2024	France	3	Jade Wiel	FDJ–Suez	Marion Borras	St. Michel–Mavic–Auber93
20–23 June 2024	Switzerland	1	Noemi Rüegg	EF Education–EasyPost	Elena Hartmann	Roland
20–23 June 2024	Switzerland	2	Linda Zanetti	Human Powered Health	Melanie Maurer	
20–23 June 2024	Switzerland	3	Caroline Baur	Orbea Women's Racing	Noemi Rüegg	EF Education–EasyPost
20–23 June 2024	Slovakia	1	Nora Jenčušová	Bepink–Bongioanni	Nora Jenčušová	Bepink–Bongioanni
20–23 June 2024	Slovakia	2	Terézia Ciriaková	WCC Team	Zuzana Michaličková	
20–23 June 2024	Slovakia	3	Alžbeta Bačíková	Dukla Women Cycling	Alžbeta Bačíková	Dukla Women Cycling
20–28 June 2024	Belgium	1	Lotte Kopecky	Team SD Worx–Protime	Lotte Kopecky	Team SD Worx–Protime
20–28 June 2024	Belgium	2	Sanne Cant	Fenix–Deceuninck	Marthe Goossens	AG Insurance–Soudal
20–28 June 2024	Belgium	3	Justine Ghekiere	AG Insurance–Soudal	Marion Norbert-Riberolle	Fenix-Deceuninck Development Team
21–22 June 2024	Algeria	1	Yasmine El Meddah		Imene Maldji	
21–22 June 2024	Algeria	2	Imene Maldji		Yasmine El Meddah	
21–22 June 2024	Algeria	3	Nesrine Houili		Khadidja Araoui	
21–22 June 2024	Israel	1	Rotem Gafinovitz	Hess Cycling Team	Rotem Gafinovitz	Hess Cycling Team
21–22 June 2024	Israel	2	Adar Shriki	Doltcini O'Shea	Adar Shriki	Doltcini O'Shea
21–22 June 2024	Israel	3	Hili Biderman		Maayan Tal	KDM-Pack Cycling Team
21–23 June 2024	Kosovo	1	Nita Latifi		Dafina Zylfiu	
21–23 June 2024	Kosovo	2	Dafina Zylfiu			
21–23 June 2024	Kosovo	3	Florentina Ramadani			
21–23 June 2024	Indonesia	1	Ayustina Delia Priatna	Astana Dewi Women Team	Dewika Mulya Sova	
21–23 June 2024	Indonesia	2	Dewika Mulya Sova		Firotika Magh Marenda	
21–23 June 2024	Indonesia	3	Firotika Magh Marenda		Ayustina Delia Priatna	Astana Dewi Women Team
21–23 June 2024	Costa Rica	1	Dixiana Quesada		Natalia Navarro Cerdas	
21–23 June 2024	Costa Rica	2	Adriana Rojas Cubero		María Fernanda Sánchez Vargas	
21–23 June 2024	Costa Rica	3	Natalia Navarro Cerdas		Krissia Araya Vega	
21–23 June 2024	Venezuela	1	Maria Andreina Daza		Angy Luna	
21–23 June 2024	Venezuela	2	Andrea Contreras		Maria Andreina Daza	
21–23 June 2024	Venezuela	3	Yngrid Porras			
21–23 June 2024	Romania	1	Manuela Mureșan	Soltec Iberoamérica	Manuela Mureșan	Soltec Iberoamérica
21–23 June 2024	Romania	2	Raissa Costea		Cătălina Cătineanu	
21–23 June 2024	Romania	3	Alexandra Iuliana Cioclu		Alexandra Iuliana Cioclu	
21–23 June 2024	Canada	1	Olivia Baril	Movistar Team	Paula Findlay	
21–23 June 2024	Canada	2	Magdeleine Vallieres	EF Education–EasyPost	Olivia Baril	Movistar Team
21–23 June 2024	Canada	3	Mara Roldan	Cynisca Cycling	Sarah Van Dam	DNA Pro Cycling

== U23 national champions ==
Date	Venue	Podium (Road Race)		Team	Podium (ITT)	Team
3–7 January 2024	Australia; Buninyong	1			Ella Simpson	ARA Skip Capital
3–7 January 2024	Australia; Buninyong	2			Felicity Wilson-Haffenden	Lidl–Trek
3–7 January 2024	Australia; Buninyong	3			Neve Bradbury	Canyon//SRAM
20 January 2024	Thailand	1			Kamonrada Khaoplot	
20 January 2024	Thailand	2			Abhichaya Hantayoong	
20 January 2024	Thailand	3			Naphatsawan Kaewthip	
25 January 2024	Colombia	1			Carolina Vargas	Eneicat–CMTeam
25 January 2024	Colombia	2			Elvia Cárdenas	
25 January 2024	Colombia	3			Gabriela López	
26 January 2024	Namibia	1			Monique Du Plessis	
26 January 2024	Namibia	2			Olivia Shililifa	
26 January 2024	Namibia	3				
1–3 February 2024	Ecuador	1	Natalia Vasquez	Best PC Ecuador	Natalia Vasquez	Best PC Ecuador
1–3 February 2024	Ecuador	2	Itzae Penafiel		Camila Salomé Vega	Best PC Ecuador
1–3 February 2024	Ecuador	3	Carol Masabanda		Carol Masabanda	
2–4 February 2024	South Africa	1			Anika Visser	
2–4 February 2024	South Africa	2			Lize-Ann Louw	WCC Team
2–4 February 2024	South Africa	3			Arina Niyaki	
6–8 February 2024	Philippines	1			Angelica Mae Altamarino	
6–8 February 2024	Philippines	2			Angela Joy Marie Bermejo	
6–8 February 2024	Philippines	3			Lynnel Martus	
8–10 February 2024	New Zealand	1			Ella Wyllie	Liv AlUla Jayco
8–10 February 2024	New Zealand	2			Charlotte Clarke	Black Magic Women's Cycling
8–10 February 2024	New Zealand	3			Maia Barclay	Black Magic Women's Cycling
12–13 April 2024	Greece	1	Eleftheria Giachou		Eleftheria Giachou	
12–13 April 2024	Greece	2	Vasiliki Kokkali		Vasiliki Kokkali	
12–13 April 2024	Greece	3	Eirini Maria Karousou		Eirini Maria Karousou	
13–15 June 2024	Eritrea	1				
13–15 June 2024	Eritrea	2				
13–15 June 2024	Eritrea	3				
14–16 June 2024	Finland	1			Wilma Aintila	Lotto–Intermarché Ladies
14–16 June 2024	Finland	2			Emilia Holmila	
14–16 June 2024	Finland	3			Anni Tapio	
16–23 June 2024	Guatemala	1			Fatima Queme Coti	
16–23 June 2024	Guatemala	2			Dulce Escobar Bautista	
16–23 June 2024	Guatemala	3			Jessica Nicho	
17–22 June 2024	China	1	Haixin Dong		Haixin Dong	
17–22 June 2024	China	2	Danna Yiman		Qianqian Gao	
17–22 June 2024	China	3	Qianqian Gao		Menghan Zhou	Bodywrap LTwoo Women's Cycling Team
18–22 June 2024	Estonia	1	Laura Lizette Sander	AG Insurance–NXTG U23 Team		
18–22 June 2024	Estonia	2	Aidi Gerde Tuisk	Team Coop–Repsol		
18–22 June 2024	Estonia	3	Elina Tasane	Doltcini O'Shea		
18–23 June 2024	Ukraine	1			Alina Bohdan	Pro Cycling Team p/b Guerciotti
18–23 June 2024	Ukraine	2			Arina Korotieieva	
18–23 June 2024	Ukraine	3			Anna Kolyzhuk	WCC Team
19–23 June 2024	Latvia	1	Kitija Siltumēna	Keukens Redant Cycling Team		
19–23 June 2024	Latvia	2	Evelina Ermane-Marcenko			
19–23 June 2024	Latvia	3	Laura Belohvoščika			
19–23 June 2024	United Kingdom	1			Josie Nelson	Team dsm–firmenich PostNL
19–23 June 2024	United Kingdom	2			Maddie Leech	Lifeplus Wahoo
19–23 June 2024	United Kingdom	3			Flora Perkins	Fenix–Deceuninck
19–23 June 2024	Poland	1			Zuzanna Chylińska	TKK Pacific Nestlé Fitness
19–23 June 2024	Poland	2			Natalia Krześlak	TKK Pacific Nestlé Fitness
19–23 June 2024	Poland	3			Olga Wankiewicz	MAT Atom Deweloper Wrocław
19–30 June 2024	Hungary	1			Dorka Jordán	Watersley R&D Road Team
19–30 June 2024	Hungary	2			Bettina Tímea Németh	Team Cookina Graz
19–30 June 2024	Hungary	3			Janka Farkas	Team Cookina Graz
20–23 June 2024	Norway	1	Magdalene Lind	Team Coop–Repsol		
20–23 June 2024	Norway	2	Camilla Rånes Bye	Team Coop–Repsol		
20–23 June 2024	Norway	3	Julie Berg Sjøbrend			
20–23 June 2024	Indonesia	1	Dewika Mulya Sova		Dewika Mulya Sova	
20–23 June 2024	Indonesia	2	Farrenty Putri		Anp I Hadenova Majid	
20–23 June 2024	Indonesia	3	Putri Sefia Ardianti		Cherlyn Novyta Sari	
20–23 June 2024	Slovenia	1			Nika Bobnar	WCC Team
20–23 June 2024	Slovenia	2			Špela Colnar	Born to Win BTC City Ljubljana Zhiraf
20–23 June 2024	Slovenia	3				
20–23 June 2024	Dominican Republic	1			Melsey Yamely Perez Vega	
20–23 June 2024	Dominican Republic	2			Awdrey Esther Martes Simon	
20–23 June 2024	Dominican Republic	3			Amelia Rosin Uribe Abreu	
20–23 June 2024	Switzerland	1			Jasmin Liechti	WCC Team
20–23 June 2024	Switzerland	2			Linda Zanetti	Human Powered Health
20–23 June 2024	Switzerland	3			Annika Liehner	Hess Cycling Team
21–22 June 2024	Algeria	1			Nesrine Houili	
21–22 June 2024	Algeria	2			Fatma Serine Houmel	
21–22 June 2024	Algeria	3			Siham Bousba	
21–23 June 2024	Kosovo	1			Florentina Ramadani	
21–23 June 2024	Kosovo	2				
21–23 June 2024	Kosovo	3				
21–23 June 2024	Costa Rica	1	Alondra Granados		Sofía Quiros Salas	
21–23 June 2024	Costa Rica	2	Fiorella Zamora		Marisol García Quirós	
21–23 June 2024	Costa Rica	3	Sofía Quiros Salas		Alondra Granados	
21–23 June 2024	Venezuela	1	Marliany González		Marliany González	
21–23 June 2024	Venezuela	2	Raybeli Moreno		Raybeli Moreno	
21–23 June 2024	Venezuela	3	Valeria Becerra Muñoz			
21–23 June 2024	Canada	1			Mara Roldan	Cynisca Cycling
21–23 June 2024	Canada	2			Ava Holmgren	Lidl–Trek
21–23 June 2024	Canada	3			Isabella Holmgren	Lidl–Trek

== Junior National Champions ==
Date	Venue	Podium (Road Race)		Team	Podium (ITT)	Team
3–7 January 2024	Australia; Buninyong	1	Lauren Bates	ARA Skip Capital	Lauren Bates	ARA Skip Capital
3–7 January 2024	Australia; Buninyong	2	Emily Dixon		Nicole Duncan	Team BridgeLane
3–7 January 2024	Australia; Buninyong	3	Hannah Gianatti		Emily Dixon	
9–11 January 2024	India; Bijapur	1	N Kasthuri		Harshita Jakhar	
9–11 January 2024	India; Bijapur	2	R Tamilarasi		Nanda Chichakhandi	
9–11 January 2024	India; Bijapur	3	Snehal Mali		Anupama Guled	
20 January 2024	Thailand	1	Suphannika Chantorn		Chin Rungchotwattana	
20 January 2024	Thailand	2	Natcha Songkhen		Natcha Songkhen	
20 January 2024	Thailand	3	Chin Rungchotwattana		Kawisara Umkamnerd	
26–28 January 2024	Namibia	1	Delsia Janse van Vuuren		Delsia Janse van Vuuren	
26–28 January 2024	Namibia	2	Maja Brinkmann		Kylie Dickerson	
26–28 January 2024	Namibia	3	Eden Spangenberg		Angela Kamati	
1–3 February 2024	Ecuador	1			Daniela Carphio	
1–3 February 2024	Ecuador	2			Katherine Jhanin Josa	
1–3 February 2024	Ecuador	3			Camila Salgado	
2–4 February 2024	South Africa	1	Errin Mackridge		Megan Botha	
2–4 February 2024	South Africa	2	Megan Botha		Errin Mackridge	
2–4 February 2024	South Africa	3	Chloe Chesterton		Carla Kotze	
6–8 February 2024	Philippines	1	Kim Syrel Bonilla		Kim Syrel Bonilla	
6–8 February 2024	Philippines	2	Rosalie Dela Cruz		Janine Dauba	
6–8 February 2024	Philippines	3	Jazmine Kaye Vinoya		Rosalie Dela Cruz	
8–10 February 2024	New Zealand	1	Kirsty Watts		Kirsty Watts	
8–10 February 2024	New Zealand	2	Elena Worrall		Sophie Maxwell	
8–10 February 2024	New Zealand	3	Finella Guttmann		Ava Maddison	Black Magic Women's Cycling
26–28 February 2024	Pakistan	1	Aneesa			
26–28 February 2024	Pakistan	2				
26–28 February 2024	Pakistan	3	Urooj			
23–24 March 2024	Chile	1	Javiera Mansilla		Maite Ibarra	
23–24 March 2024	Chile	2	Florencia Monsalvez		Marlen Rojas	
23–24 March 2024	Chile	3	Maite Ibarra		Javiera Mansilla	
6–7 April 2024	Paraguay	1	Milagros Ferreira		Milagros Ferreira	
6–7 April 2024	Paraguay	2				
6–7 April 2024	Paraguay	3				
12–13 April 2024	Greece	1	Eirini Papadimitriou		Eirini Papadimitriou	
12–13 April 2024	Greece	2	Kalliopi Souliou		Niki Frintzila	
12–13 April 2024	Greece	3	Niki Frintzila		Georgia Rompotou	
7–9 June 2024	Costa Rica	1	Yailin Gómez		Yailin Gómez	
7–9 June 2024	Costa Rica	2	Karla Bustos		Isabel García Quirós	
7–9 June 2024	Costa Rica	3	Dennis Juliana Rahilly Araya		Melissa Ávila Miller	Ciclismo Avimil
13–15 June 2024	Eritrea	1				
13–15 June 2024	Eritrea	2				
13–15 June 2024	Eritrea	3				
14–16 June 2024	Finland	1			Anni Teronen	
14–16 June 2024	Finland	2			Viivi Turpeinen	
14–16 June 2024	Finland	3			Elisabet Kapanen	
15–21 June 2024	Bulgaria	1	Yoana Valkanova		Nikol Kolisheva	
15–21 June 2024	Bulgaria	2	Nikol Kolisheva		Nikol Angelova	
15–21 June 2024	Bulgaria	3	Lyudmila Kirova		Todora Mateeva	
15–23 June 2024	Netherlands	1	Puck Langenbarg	WV Schijndel	Fee Knaven	AG Insurance–Soudal
15–23 June 2024	Netherlands	2	Megan Arens	Restore Cycling Ladies	Puck Langenbarg	WV Schijndel
15–23 June 2024	Netherlands	3	Esmee Blok	Restore Cycling Ladies	Megan Arens	Restore Cycling Ladies
16–23 June 2024	Guatemala	1	Hiayra Leonardo Cristales		Jazmin Puac Elias	
16–23 June 2024	Guatemala	2	Jazmin Puac Elias		Ashley Méndez	
16–23 June 2024	Guatemala	3	Ashley Méndez		Melany Alvarenga	
17–22 June 2024	China	1	Xiaoyan Xu		Shiyu Wang	
17–22 June 2024	China	2	Kuang Yueyue		Zihan Lin	
17–22 June 2024	China	3	Mu Gaoxue		Xiaoyan Xu	
18–22 June 2024	Estonia	1	Zlata Bronishevskaja		Liisi Lohk	
18–22 June 2024	Estonia	2	Liisi Lohk			Zlata Bronishevskaja
18–22 June 2024	Estonia	3	Lauren Pohl			Lauren Pohl
18–23 June 2024	Sweden	1	Elin Ålsjö		Anna Söderqvist	
18–23 June 2024	Sweden	2	Anna Söderqvist		Julia Lindström	
18–23 June 2024	Sweden	3	Julia Lindström		Elin Ålsjö	
18–23 June 2024	Ukraine	1	Milana Ushakova	Van Moer Logistics Cycling Team	Milana Ushakova	Van Moer Logistics Cycling Team
18–23 June 2024	Ukraine	2	Yelyzaveta Frolova		Maryna Romanenko	
18–23 June 2024	Ukraine	3	Anastasiia Furnyk		Karyna Potomko	
18–25 June 2024	Mongolia	1	Otgontenger Khuvizaya		Otgontenger Khuvizaya	
18–25 June 2024	Mongolia	2	Enkhchimeg Enkhtuul		Enkhchimeg Enkhtuul	
18–25 June 2024	Mongolia	3	Erdenetungalag Khash-Erdene		Erdenetungalag Khash-Erdene	
19–23 June 2024	Latvia	1	Līva Šlosberga		Beate Bula	
19–23 June 2024	Latvia	2	Amanda Reilija Zariņa		Līva Šlosberga	
19–23 June 2024	Latvia	3			Amanda Reilija Zariņa	
19–23 June 2024	Poland	1	Kornelia Braun		Alicja Matuła	
19–23 June 2024	Poland	2	Zuzanna Marecka		Weronika Wąsaty	
19–23 June 2024	Poland	3	Milena Tarasewicz		Pola Błońska	
19–23 June 2024	Kazakhstan	1	Aruzhan Rakhmzhan		Mariya Yelkina	
19–23 June 2024	Kazakhstan	2	Yevgeniya Zaam		Angelina Burenkova	
19–23 June 2024	Kazakhstan	3	Yuliya Li		Dinara Kopzhassarova	
19–30 June 2024	Hungary	1	Réka Tóth		Réka Tóth	
19–30 June 2024	Hungary	2	Málna Mudra		Málna Mudra	
19–30 June 2024	Hungary	3	Panna Bagi		Panna Bagi	
19–30 June 2024	Italy	1	Giada Silo	BFT Burzoni	Linda Sanarini	BFT Burzoni
19–30 June 2024	Italy	2	Silvia Milesi	Biesse–Carrera	Irma Siri	U.C. Conscio Pedale del Sile
19–30 June 2024	Italy	3	Chantal Pegolo	U.C. Conscio Pedale del Sile	Elena De Laurentiis	Team Di Federico
20–23 June 2024	Ireland	1	Lucy Bénézet Minns	Tofauti Everyone Active	Lucy Bénézet Minns	Tofauti Everyone Active
20–23 June 2024	Ireland	2	Aliyah Rafferty	Tofauti Everyone Active	Aliyah Rafferty	Tofauti Everyone Active
20–23 June 2024	Ireland	3	Áine Doherty		Kate Murphy	Sliabh Luachra Cycling Club
20–23 June 2024	Czech Republic	1	️Daniela Hezinová	Watersley R&D Road Team	Nela Kaňkovská	AG Insurance-Soudal Quick-Step U19 Team
20–23 June 2024	Czech Republic	2	Nela Kaňkovská	AG Insurance-Soudal Quick-Step U19 Team	Anna Hanáková	
20–23 June 2024	Czech Republic	3	Kateřina Douděrová	BB.com Cycling Team	️Daniela Hezinová	Watersley R&D Road Team
20–23 June 2024	Norway	1	Kamilla Aasebø	Airtox–Carl Ras Junior Women	Kamilla Aasebø	Airtox–Carl Ras Junior Women
20–23 June 2024	Norway	2	Marte Dolven		Mia Gjertsen	Airtox–Carl Ras Junior Women
20–23 June 2024	Norway	3	Matilde Skjelde	Airtox–Carl Ras Junior Women	Matilde Skjelde	Airtox–Carl Ras Junior Women
20–23 June 2024	Indonesia	1	Andini Putri Anatasya		Salsa Zahra	
20–23 June 2024	Indonesia	2	Shafira Nur Azizah Gunawan Putri		Andini Putri Anatasya	
20–23 June 2024	Indonesia	3	Salsa Zahra		Shafira Nur Azizah Gunawan Putri	
20–23 June 2024	Slovenia	1	Maruša Tereza Šerkezi		Zoja Ferlež	Born to Win BTC City Ljubljana Zhiraf
20–23 June 2024	Slovenia	2	Sara Pestotnik		Eva Potočnik	
20–23 June 2024	Slovenia	3	Zoja Ferlež	Born to Win BTC City Ljubljana Zhiraf	Anet Trakonja	
20–23 June 2024	Dominican Republic	1	Feline Mendoza Toribio		Christal Cornelio Almonte	
20–23 June 2024	Dominican Republic	2	Christal Cornelio Almonte		Feline Mendoza Toribio	
20–23 June 2024	Dominican Republic	3	Winifer Lisbeth Aquino			
20–23 June 2024	Switzerland	1	Chiara Mettier		Lara Liehner	Thömus - Akros - Youngstars
20–23 June 2024	Switzerland	2	Muriel Furrer	BIXS Performance Race Team	Muriel Furrer	BIXS Performance Race Team
20–23 June 2024	Switzerland	3	Lara Liehner	Thömus - Akros - Youngstars	Ainura Gut	
20–23 June 2024	Slovakia	1	Viktória Chladoňová	Climberg SportTeam	Viktória Chladoňová	Climberg SportTeam
20–23 June 2024	Slovakia	2	Anna Ržoncová		Nina Andacká	
20–23 June 2024	Slovakia	3	Sofia Ungerová		Sofia Ungerová	
21–22 June 2024	Algeria	1	Malak Mechab		Malak Mechab	
21–22 June 2024	Algeria	2	Yamna Bouyacor		Yamna Bouyacor	
21–22 June 2024	Algeria	3	Marya Abbou		Marya Abbou	
21–22 June 2024	Israel	1	Tamar Bezalel		Tamar Bezalel	
21–22 June 2024	Israel	2	Oran Herman		Amit Geismar	
21–22 June 2024	Israel	3	Amit Geismar		Amit Eisenberg	
21–23 June 2024	Kosovo	1			Fakresa Gërbeshi	
21–23 June 2024	Kosovo	2				
21–23 June 2024	Kosovo	3				
21–23 June 2024	Venezuela	1	Yeniret Roa		Johaneth Vargas	
21–23 June 2024	Venezuela	2	Johaneth Vargas		Oliviangel Castillo	
21–23 June 2024	Venezuela	3	Fabiana Candelas Sanabria		Fabiana Candelas Sanabria	
21–23 June 2024	Romania	1	Elisa Natalia Mare		Ana-Elena Gheorghe	
21–23 June 2024	Romania	2	Iana-Alesia Balteş		Elisa Natalia Mare	
21–23 June 2024	Romania	3	Ana-Elena Gheorghe		Iana-Alesia Balteş	
21–23 June 2024	Canada	1	Alexandra Volstad	Watersley R&D Road Team	Sidney Swierenga	
21–23 June 2024	Canada	2	Naomie Julien	Watersley R&D Road Team	Larissa Pedersen	TaG Cycling
21–23 June 2024	Canada	3	Addison Frank		Florence St-Onge	
21–23 June 2024	Serbia	1	Iva Škrbić		Iva Škrbić	
21–23 June 2024	Serbia	2	Nikolija Kulinčević		Nikolija Kulinčević	
21–23 June 2024	Serbia	3	Marija Bajeva		Marija Pavlović	

== Champions in UCI Women's teams ==
UCI Women's WorldTeams
Team	Road Race Champions	Time Trial Champions
AG Insurance–Soudal	Kimberley Le Court (MRI)	Kimberley Le Court (MRI); Mireia Benito (ESP)
Canyon//SRAM		
Ceratizit–WNT Pro Cycling		Marta Jaskulska (POL)
FDJ–Suez		Grace Brown (AUS)
Fenix–Deceuninck		
Human Powered Health		Audrey Cordon-Ragot (FRA); Yuliia Biriukova (UKR)
Lidl–Trek	Elisa Longo Borghini (ITA)	Vittoria Guazzini (ITA)
Liv AlUla Jayco	Ruby Roseman-Gannon (AUS); Ella Wyllie (NZL); Urška Žigart (SLO); Teniel Campbell (TTO)	Urška Žigart (SLO); Teniel Campbell (TTO)
Movistar Team	Olivia Baril (CAN); Paula Patiño (COL); Arlenis Sierra (CUB); Jelena Erić (SRB)	Arlenis Sierra (CUB); Emma Norsgaard (DEN)
Roland	Anna Kiesenhofer (AUT); Antri Christoforou (CYP)	Anna Kiesenhofer (AUT); Elena Hartmann (SUI); Antri Christoforou (CYP)
Team dsm–firmenich PostNL	Juliette Labous (FRA); Franziska Koch (GER); Pfeiffer Georgi (GBR)	
Team SD Worx–Protime	Lotte Kopecky (BEL); Marie Schreiber (LUX); Chantal van den Broek-Blaak (NED); Blanka Vas (HUN)	Lotte Kopecky (BEL); Christine Majerus (LUX)
Visma–Lease a Bike		Riejanne Markus (NED); Anna Henderson (GBR)
UAE Team ADQ	Anastasia Carbonari (LAT); Dominika Włodarczyk (POL); Safia Al Sayegh (UAE)	Safia Al Sayegh (UAE)
Uno-X Mobility	Rebecca Koerner (DEN); Anniina Ahtosalo (FIN); Mie Bjørndal Ottestad (NOR)	Anniina Ahtosalo (FIN); Katrine Aalerud (NOR)

UCI Women's Continental Teams
Team	Road Race Champions	Time Trial Champions
A.S.D. K2 Women Team		
AG Insurance–NXTG U23 Team	Laura Sander (EST)	Julia Kopecký (CZE); Laura Sander (EST)
Alba Development Road Team		
ARA Skip Capital		
Arkéa–B&B Hotels Women		
Aromitalia 3T Vaiano		
Astana Dewi Women Team	Agustina Delia Priatna (IDN)	
Bepink–Bongioanni	Nora Jenčušová (SVK)	Nora Jenčušová (SVK); Ana Vitória Magalhães (BRA)
Bodywrap LTwoo Women's Cycling Team		
Boneshaker Project presented by ROXO		
BTC City Ljubljana Zhiraf Ambedo		
Canyon–SRAM Generation		
Chevalmeire		
China Liv Pro Cycling	Zhang Hao (CHN)	
Cofidis		
Colombia Potencia de la Vida–Strongman Femenino		
Cycleversum Women Team		
Cynisca Cycling	Fiona Mangan (IRL)	Fiona Mangan (IRL)
DAS–Hutchinson–Brother–UK		
DNA Pro Cycling		Diana Peñuela (COL)
Doltcini O'Shea		
EF Education–Cannondale	Noemi Rüegg (SUI); Kristen Faulkner (USA)	Kim Cadzow (NZL)
Eneicat–CMTeam	Daniela Campos (POR)	Daniela Campos (POR)
Fenix–Deceuninck Development Team		
GT Krush Rebellease		
Hess Cycling Team	Rotem Gafinovitz (ISR)	Rotem Gafinovitz (ISR)
HKSI Pro Cycling Team	Lee Sze Wing (HKG)	Leung Wing Yee (HKG)
Isolmant–Premac–Vittoria		
Laboral Kutxa–Fundación Euskadi	Eri Yonamine (JPN); Usoa Ostolaza (ESP)	
Li Ning Star Ladies		
Lifeplus Wahoo		
Liv AlUla Jayco Women's Continental Team		
LKT Team		
Lotto–Dstny Ladies		
MAT Atom Deweloper Wrocław		
Maxx-Solar Rose Women Racing		
Primeau Vélo - Groupe Abadie	Miryam Núñez (ECU)	Miryam Núñez (ECU)
Pro-Noctis–200° Coffee–Hargreaves Contracting		
Proximus-Cyclis CT		
Soltec Iberoamérica	Manuela Mureșan (ROM)	Aranza Villalón (CHI); Manuela Mureșan (ROM)
St. Michel–Mavic–Auber93		
Standard Insurance PHI		
Tashkent City Women Professional Cycling Team	Yanina Kuskova (UZB)	Margarita Misyurina (UZB)
Team Bridgelane WE		
Team Coop–Repsol		
Team Dukla Praha	Barbora Němcová (CZE)	
Team Komugi–Grand Est		
Thailand Women's Cycling Team	Phetdarin Somrat (THA)	Phetdarin Somrat (THA)
Top Girls Fassa Bortolo		
Torelli		
UAE Development Team		
Virginia's Blue Ridge–Twenty24		
VolkerWessels Women Cyclingteam		
WCC Team		
Winspace		
