= Laura Molenaar =

Dutch cyclist (born 2002)

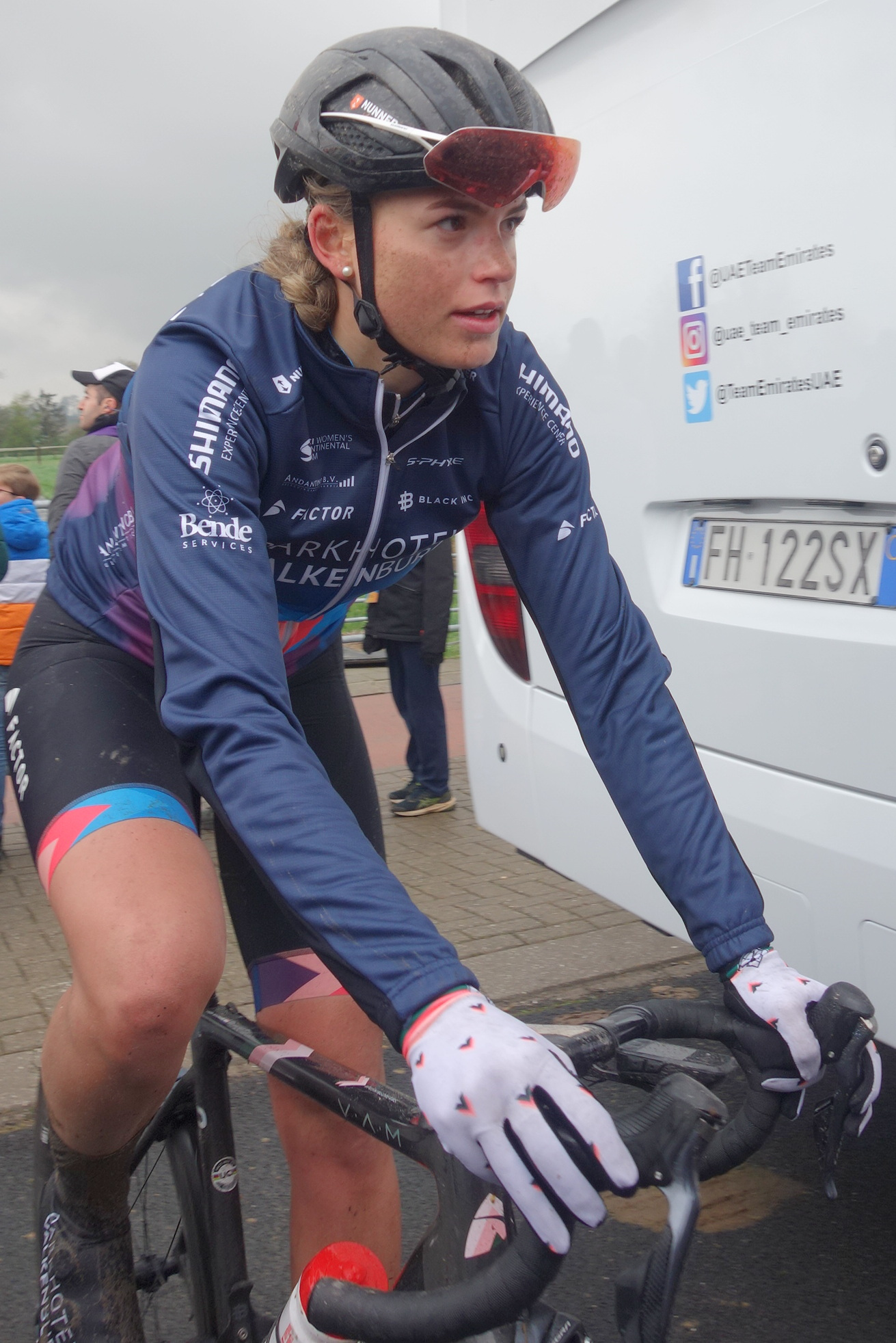
- Molenaar in 2023

Personal information
- Born: 26 February 2002 (age 24) Oud-Beijerland, Netherlands

Cycling career
- Sport: Cycling
- Current team: VolkerWessels Women Cyclingteam
- Discipline: Road
- Role: Rider

Amateur team
- 2021-2022: WV Schijndel

Professional team
- 2023–: Parkhotel Valkenburg

Laura Molenaar (born 26 February 2002) is a Dutch cyclist, who currently rides for UCI Women's ProTeam VolkerWessels Women Cyclingteam. Her brother is fellow professional cyclist Alex Molenaar.

== Major results ==
2024
1st Overall Tour de Pologne

1st Stage 2

=== Grand Tour general classification results timeline ===
Grand Tour	2024	2025	2026
La Vuelta	84	—	—
Giro d'Italia	—	—	—
Tour de France	—	85	DNF
