= Maxx–Solar Rose Women Racing =

Italian cycling team

Team information
- Registered: Germany
- Founded: 2016
- Discipline: Road
- Status: National (2016, 2018, 2022); UCI Women's Continental Team (2023–)

Team name history
- 2016 2018 2022 2023–: Maxx–Solar Women; Maxx–Solar–Lindig; Maxx–Solar–Lindig; Maxx–Solar Rose Women Racing

Maxx–Solar Rose Women Racing is a German women's road cycling team that was founded in 2016 and registering as a professional team with the UCI for the 2023 season.

== Major results ==
2022
Int. Braunauer Radsporttage Kriterium, Lydia Ventker
2023
Eröffnungsrennen Leonding, Katharina Fox
Radkriterium St. Anton am Arlberg, Leila Gschwentner

== National Champions ==
2023
Austria U23 Time Trial, Leila Gschwentner
