= Emily Marcolini =

Canadian cyclist

Personal information
- Full name: Emily Marcolini
- Born: 12 November 1995 (age 30)

Cycling career
- Sport: Cycling
- Discipline: Road
- Role: Rider

Professional team
- 2019: Tibco–Silicon Valley Bank

Emily Marcolini (born 12 November 1995) is a Canadian professional racing cyclist, who last rode for the UCI Women's Team Tibco–Silicon Valley Bank during the 2019 women's road cycling season.

== Major results ==
2022
6th Overall Tour of the Gila

1st Stage 5
