= Primeau Velo Racing =

Italian cycling team

Team information
- Registered: Canada
- Founded: 2023
- Discipline: Road
- Status: UCI Women's Continental Team (2023–)

Team name history
- 2023–: Primeau Velo Racing

Primeau Velo Racing is a Canadian women's road cycling team that was founded in 2023.

== Major results ==
2023
Stage 3 Tucson Bicycle Classic, Penelope Primeau
Stages 1 & 2 GP Charlevoix, Penelope Primeau
