= Team Grand Est–Komugi–La Fabrique =

Team information
- Registered: France
- Founded: 2019
- Discipline: Road
- Status: National (2019–2022); UCI Women's Continental Team (2023–)

Team name history
- 2019–2022 2023–: Team Macadam's Cowboys WE; Team Grand Est–Komugi–La Fabrique

Team Grand Est–Komugi–La Fabrique is a French women's road cycling team that was founded in 2019.

== Major results ==
202
Route Féminine de Loire Atlantique, Maria Yapura
Grand-Prix Oberbaselbiet, Maria Yapura
2023
Overall Loire Ladies Tour, Chloé Charpentier

Stages 1 & 2, Chloé Charpentier

Stage 4 Tour de Feminin, Chloé Charpentier
Stage 3 Tour de Charente-Maritime Féminin, Maria Yapura
Grand-Prix Oberbaselbiet, Maria Yapura

== National Champions ==
2023
Argentina Time Trial, Maria Yapura
