= List of teams and cyclists in the 2024 Giro d'Italia Women =

List of cyclists

The following is a list of teams and cyclists that will compete in the 2024 Giro d'Italia Women.

== Teams ==
22 teams will participate in the race.

Each team will start with seven riders. All 15 UCI Women's WorldTeams were automatically invited. They will be joined by five UCI Women's Continental Teams selected by organisers RCS Sport. The two best UCI Women's Continental Teams of the 2023 season also gained automatic invitation. The teams were announced on 7 June 2024.

UCI Women's WorldTeams

- AG Insurance–Soudal
- Canyon–SRAM
- Ceratizit–WNT Pro Cycling
- FDJ–Suez
- Fenix–Deceuninck
- Human Powered Health
- Roland
- Lidl–Trek
- Liv AlUla Jayco
- Movistar Team
- Team dsm–firmenich PostNL
- Team SD Worx–Protime
- UAE Team ADQ
- Uno-X Mobility
- Visma–Lease a Bike

UCI Women's Continental Teams

- Bepink–Bongioanni
- Cofidis
- EF Education–Cannondale
- Isolmant–Premac–Vittoria
- Laboral Kutxa–Fundación Euskadi
- Tashkent City Women Professional Cycling Team
- Top Girls Fassa Bortolo

== Cyclists ==
Legend
No.	Starting number worn by the rider during the Giro
Pos.	Position in the general classification
Time	Deficit to the winner of the general classification
‡	Denotes riders born on or after 1 January 2002 eligible for the young rider classification
General classification	Denotes the winner of the general classification
Points classification	Denotes the winner of the points classification
Mountains classification	Denotes the winner of the mountains classification
Young rider classification	Denotes the winner of the young rider classification (eligibility indicated by ‡)
DNS	Denotes a rider who did not start a stage, followed by the stage before which she withdrew
DNF	Denotes a rider who did not finish a stage, followed by the stage in which she withdrew
DSQ	Denotes a rider who was disqualified from the race, followed by the stage in which this occurred
OTL	Denotes a rider finished outside the time limit, followed by the stage in which they did so
Ages correct as of Sunday 7 July 2024, the date on which the Giro began

=== By starting number ===
No.	Name	Nationality	Team	Age	Pos.	Time	Ref.
1	Lotte Kopecky	Belgium	Team SD Worx–Protime	28	2	+ 21"	
2	Elena Cecchini	Italy	Team SD Worx–Protime	32	71	+ 1h 51' 41"	
3	Niamh Fisher-Black	New Zealand	Team SD Worx–Protime	23	10	+ 5' 55"	
4	Femke Gerritse	Netherlands	Team SD Worx–Protime	23	46	+ 1h 19' 40"	
5	Barbara Guarischi	Italy	Team SD Worx–Protime	33	100	+ 2h 38' 03"	
6	Chantal van den Broek-Blaak	Netherlands	Team SD Worx–Protime	34	DNF-7	–	
7	Blanka Vas	Hungary	Team SD Worx–Protime	22	41	+ 1h 10' 07"	
11	Kimberley Le Court	Mauritius	AG Insurance–Soudal	28	18	+ 16' 22"	
12	Julia Borgström	Sweden	AG Insurance–Soudal	23	DNF-7	–	
13	Lore De Schepper ‡	Belgium	AG Insurance–Soudal	18	47	+ 1h 20' 29"	
14	Justine Ghekiere	Belgium	AG Insurance–Soudal	28	32	+ 54' 13"	
15	Marthe Goossens ‡	Belgium	AG Insurance–Soudal	22	DNF-7	–	
16	Gaia Masetti	Italy	AG Insurance–Soudal	22	48	+ 1h 21' 19"	
17	Maud Rijnbeek ‡	Netherlands	AG Insurance–Soudal	21	DNF-7	–	
21	Monica Trinca Colonel	Italy	Bepink–Bongioanni	25	23	+ 32' 30"	
22	Andrea Casagranda ‡	Italy	Bepink–Bongioanni	19	96	+ 2h 29' 29"	
23	Carmela Cipriani	Italy	Bepink–Bongioanni	27	64	+ 1h 37' 23"	
24	Ana Vitória Magalhães	Brazil	Bepink–Bongioanni	23	73	+ 1h 52' 40"	
25	Nora Jenčušová ‡	Slovakia	Bepink–Bongioanni	22	90	+ 2h 19' 09"	
26	Angela Oro ‡	Italy	Bepink–Bongioanni	22	93	+ 2h 26' 11"	
27	Elisa Valulini ‡	Italy	Bepink–Bongioanni	19	29	+ 45' 43"	
31	Elise Chabbey	Switzerland	Canyon–SRAM	31	DNS-7	–	
32	Neve Bradbury ‡	Australia	Canyon–SRAM	22	3	+ 1' 16"	
33	Antonia Niedermaier ‡	Germany	Canyon–SRAM	21	6	+ 2' 41"	
34	Soraya Paladin	Italy	Canyon–SRAM	31	52	+ 1h 23' 57"	
35	Agnieszka Skalniak-Sójka	Poland	Canyon–SRAM	27	50	+ 1h 21' 54"	
36	Alice Towers ‡	Great Britain	Canyon–SRAM	21	DNF-4	–	
37	Maike van der Duin	Netherlands	Canyon–SRAM	22	DNF-6	–	
41	Cédrine Kerbaol	France	Ceratizit–WNT Pro Cycling	23	DNF-4	–	
42	Alice Maria Arzuffi	Italy	Ceratizit–WNT Pro Cycling	29	17	+ 14' 38"	
43	Laura Asencio	France	Ceratizit–WNT Pro Cycling	26	31	+ 49' 45"	
44	Mylène de Zoete	Netherlands	Ceratizit–WNT Pro Cycling	25	99	+ 2h 37' 22"	
45	Arianna Fidanza	Italy	Ceratizit–WNT Pro Cycling	29	82	+ 2h 02' 49"	
46	Marta Jaskulska	Poland	Ceratizit–WNT Pro Cycling	24	81	+ 2h 02' 00"	
47	Kathrin Schweinberger	Austria	Ceratizit–WNT Pro Cycling	27	92	+ 2h 23' 07"	
51	Hannah Ludwig	Germany	Cofidis	24	45	+ 1h 19' 22"	
52	Martina Alzini	Italy	Cofidis	27	DNF-7	–	
53	Julie Bego	France	Cofidis	19	DNF-5	–	
54	Morgane Coston	France	Cofidis	33	83	+ 2h 02' 58"	
55	Séverine Eraud	France	Cofidis	29	DNF-5	–	
56	Nikola Nosková	Czechia	Cofidis	27	DNF-7	–	
57	Sarah Roy	Australia	Cofidis	38	70	+ 1h 47' 10"	
61	Kim Cadzow	New Zealand	EF Education–Cannondale	22	DNF-7	–	
63	Letizia Borghesi	Italy	EF Education–Cannondale	25	DNF-7	–	
64	Clara Emond	Canada	EF Education–Cannondale	27	DNF-7	–	
65	Nina Kessler	Netherlands	EF Education–Cannondale	36	DNS-6	–	
66	Clara Koppenburg	Germany	EF Education–Cannondale	28	68	+ 1h 41' 13"	
67	Magdeleine Vallieres	Canada	EF Education–Cannondale	22	38	+ 1h 04' 56"	
71	Cecilie Uttrup Ludwig	Denmark	FDJ–Suez	28	8	+ 4' 31"	
72	Loes Adegeest	Netherlands	FDJ–Suez	27	62	+ 1h 35' 16"	
73	Grace Brown	Australia	FDJ–Suez	32	34	+ 59' 46"	
74	Nina Buijsman	Netherlands	FDJ–Suez	26	27	+ 41' 33"	
75	Vittoria Guazzini	Italy	FDJ–Suez	23	DNS-7	–	
76	Alessia Vigilia	Italy	FDJ–Suez	24	77	+ 1h 56' 59"	
77	Jade Wiel	France	FDJ–Suez	24	DNS-6	–	
81	Pauliena Rooijakkers	Netherlands	Fenix–Deceuninck	31	4	+ 2' 05"	
82	Aniek van Alphen	Netherlands	Fenix–Deceuninck	25	76	+ 1h 55' 29"	
83	Ceylin del Carmen Alvarado	Netherlands	Fenix–Deceuninck	25	58	+ 1h 30' 33"	
84	Sanne Cant	Belgium	Fenix–Deceuninck	33	37	+ 1h 03' 17"	
85	Millie Couzens ‡	Great Britain	Fenix–Deceuninck	20	DNF-6	–	
86	Evy Kuijpers	Netherlands	Fenix–Deceuninck	29	95	+ 2h 28' 52"	
87	Greta Marturano	Italy	Fenix–Deceuninck	26	DNF-7	–	
91	Ruth Edwards	United States	Human Powered Health	30	30	+ 45' 57"	
92	Giada Borghesi ‡	Italy	Human Powered Health	21	DNF-7	–	
93	Romy Kasper	Germany	Human Powered Health	36	60	+ 1h 32' 23"	
94	Barbara Malcotti	Italy	Human Powered Health	24	15	+ 13' 29"	
95	Katia Ragusa	Italy	Human Powered Health	27	80	+ 2h 00' 48"	
96	Silvia Zanardi	Italy	Human Powered Health	24	91	+ 2h 19' 37"	
97	Linda Zanetti ‡	Switzerland	Human Powered Health	22	87	+ 2h 13' 01"	
101	Beatrica Rossato	Italy	Isolmant–Premac–Vittoria	27	63	+ 1h 36' 53"	
102	Sofia Arici ‡	Italy	Isolmant–Premac–Vittoria	21	98	+ 2h 34' 50"	
103	Valeria Curnis	Italy	Isolmant–Premac–Vittoria	29	DNF-6	–	
104	Sara Mazzorana	Italy	Isolmant–Premac–Vittoria	28	DNF-5	–	
105	Sara Pepoli ‡	Italy	Isolmant–Premac–Vittoria	19	86	+ 2h 10' 35"	
106	Emanuela Zanetti	Italy	Isolmant–Premac–Vittoria	24	DNF-6	–	
107	Asia Zontone	Italy	Isolmant–Premac–Vittoria	22	88	+ 2h 14' 46"	
111	Ane Santesteban	Spain	Laboral Kutxa–Fundación Euskadi	33	21	+ 32' 10"	
112	Usoa Ostolaza	Spain	Laboral Kutxa–Fundación Euskadi	26	16	+ 13' 35"	
113	Nadia Quagliotto	Italy	Laboral Kutxa–Fundación Euskadi	27	67	+ 1h 40' 16"	
114	Aileen Schweikart	Germany	Laboral Kutxa–Fundación Euskadi	28	53	+ 1h 25' 00"	
115	Debora Silvestri	Italy	Laboral Kutxa–Fundación Euskadi	26	25	+ 35' 56"	
116	Laura Tomasi	Italy	Laboral Kutxa–Fundación Euskadi	25	DNF-8	–	
117	Cristina Tonetti ‡	Italy	Laboral Kutxa–Fundación Euskadi	22	84	+ 2h 05' 18"	
121	Elisa Longo Borghini	Italy	Lidl–Trek	32	1	24h 02' 16"	
122	Elisa Balsamo	Italy	Lidl–Trek	26	DNF-5	–	
123	Lucinda Brand	Netherlands	Lidl–Trek	35	57	+ 1h 30' 09"	
124	Brodie Chapman	Australia	Lidl–Trek	33	22	+ 32' 15"	
125	Elizabeth Deignan	Great Britain	Lidl–Trek	35	55	+ 1h 26' 27"	
126	Lauretta Hanson	Australia	Lidl–Trek	29	74	+ 1h 54' 11"	
127	Gaia Realini	Italy	Lidl–Trek	23	7	+ 3' 41"	
131	Mavi García	Spain	Liv AlUla Jayco	40	9	+ 5' 17"	
132	Ingvild Gåskjenn	Norway	Liv AlUla Jayco	26	DNF-6	–	
133	Amber Pate	Australia	Liv AlUla Jayco	29	75	+ 1h 54' 14"	
134	Ruby Roseman-Gannon	Australia	Liv AlUla Jayco	25	65	+ 1h 39' 26"	
135	Silke Smulders	Netherlands	Liv AlUla Jayco	23	13	+ 11' 49"	
136	Ella Wyllie ‡	New Zealand	Liv AlUla Jayco	21	40	+ 1h 07' 23"	
137	Urška Žigart	Slovenia	Liv AlUla Jayco	27	12	+ 9' 09"	
141	Arlenis Sierra	Cuba	Movistar Team	31	56	+ 1h 28' 10"	
142	Jelena Erić	Serbia	Movistar Team	28	66	+ 1h 39' 29"	
143	Liane Lippert	Germany	Movistar Team	26	DNF-8	–	
144	Sara Martín	Spain	Movistar Team	25	54	+ 1h 25' 53"	
145	Mareille Meijering	Netherlands	Movistar Team	29	11	+ 6' 05"	
146	Paula Patiño	Colombia	Movistar Team	27	DNF-7	–	
147	Claire Steels	Great Britain	Movistar Team	37	26	+ 36' 56"	
151	Elena Hartmann	Switzerland	Roland	33	DNF-4	–	
152	Antri Christoforou	Cyprus	Roland	32	DNF-6	–	
153	Sofia Collinelli	Italy	Roland	22	DNF-7	–	
154	Nathalie Eklund	Sweden	Roland	33	89	+ 2h 17' 13"	
155	Nguyễn Thị Thật	Vietnam	Roland	31	DNF-7	–	
156	Elena Pirrone	Italy	Roland	25	DNS-6	–	
157	Giorgia Vettorello	Italy	Roland	24	59	+ 1h 31' 02"	
161	Olga Zabelinskaya	Uzbekistan	Tashkent City Women Professional Cycling Team	44	DNF-7	–	
162	Mohinabonu Elmurodova ‡	Uzbekistan	Tashkent City Women Professional Cycling Team	18	DNF-6	–	
163	Madina Kakhorova ‡	Uzbekistan	Tashkent City Women Professional Cycling Team	22	DNF-6	–	
164	Nafosat Kozieva	Uzbekistan	Tashkent City Women Professional Cycling Team	25	DNF-6	–	
165	Anna Kuskova ‡	Uzbekistan	Tashkent City Women Professional Cycling Team	20	DNF-3	–	
166	Yanina Kuskova	Uzbekistan	Tashkent City Women Professional Cycling Team	22	85	+ 2h 10' 18"	
167	Margarita Misyurina ‡	Uzbekistan	Tashkent City Women Professional Cycling Team	21	DNF-6	–	
171	Juliette Labous	France	Team dsm–firmenich PostNL	25	5	+ 2' 15"	
172	Francesca Barale ‡	Italy	Team dsm–firmenich PostNL	21	51	+ 1h 22' 29"	
173	Eleonora Ciabocco ‡	Italy	Team dsm–firmenich PostNL	20	DNF-8	–	
174	Franziska Koch	Germany	Team dsm–firmenich PostNL	23	49	+ 1h 21' 23"	
175	Josie Nelson ‡	Great Britain	Team dsm–firmenich PostNL	22	97	+ 2h 29' 38"	
176	Becky Storrie	Great Britain	Team dsm–firmenich PostNL	25	DNF-4	–	
177	Nienke Vinke ‡	Netherlands	Team dsm–firmenich PostNL	20	43	+ 1h 12' 36"	
181	Fem van Empel ‡	Netherlands	Visma–Lease a Bike	21	DNF-5	–	
182	Carlijn Achtereekte	Netherlands	Visma–Lease a Bike	34	69	+ 1h 44' 04"	
183	Femke de Vries	Netherlands	Visma–Lease a Bike	30	20	+ 29' 21"	
184	Mijntje Geurts ‡	Netherlands	Visma–Lease a Bike	20	DNS-4	–	
185	Lieke Nooijen	Netherlands	Visma–Lease a Bike	22	42	+ 1h 12' 28"	
186	Maud Oudeman ‡	Netherlands	Visma–Lease a Bike	20	DNS-7	–	
187	Rosita Reijnhout ‡	Netherlands	Visma–Lease a Bike	20	DNS-5	–	
191	Giorgia Bariani	Italy	Top Girls Fassa Bortolo	23	DNF-6	–	
192	Virginia Bortoli ‡	Italy	Top Girls Fassa Bortolo	20	DNF-7	–	
193	Alessia Missiaggia	Italy	Top Girls Fassa Bortolo	25	102	+ 2h 41' 51"	
194	Iris Monticolo	Italy	Top Girls Fassa Bortolo	23	DNF-8	–	
195	Alice Palazzi ‡	Italy	Top Girls Fassa Bortolo	22	101	+ 2h 39' 05"	
196	Elisa De Vallier ‡	Italy	Top Girls Fassa Bortolo	20	79	+ 1h 59' 36"	
197	Gaia Segato ‡	Italy	Top Girls Fassa Bortolo	20	39	+ 1h 05' 08"	
201	Chiara Consonni	Italy	UAE Team ADQ	25	DNS-7	–	
202	Alena Amialiusik		UAE Team ADQ	35	72	+ 1h 51' 41"	
203	Eleonora Camilla Gasparrini ‡	Italy	UAE Team ADQ	22	35	+ 1h 00' 02"	
204	Elizabeth Holden	Great Britain	UAE Team ADQ	26	78	+ 1h 58' 18"	
205	Erica Magnaldi	Italy	UAE Team ADQ	31	14	+ 13' 22"	
206	Silvia Persico	Italy	UAE Team ADQ	26	36	+ 1h 00' 05"	
207	Dominika Włodarczyk	Poland	UAE Team ADQ	23	28	+ 44' 35"	
211	Anouska Koster	Netherlands	Uno-X Mobility	30	44	+ 1h 14' 19"	
212	Katrine Aalerud	Norway	Uno-X Mobility	29	33	+ 55' 39"	
213	Solbjørk Minke Anderson ‡	Denmark	Uno-X Mobility	19	19	+ 19' 18"	
214	Marte Berg Edseth	Norway	Uno-X Mobility	25	61	+ 1h 34' 35"	
215	Rebecca Koerner	Denmark	Uno-X Mobility	23	94	+ 2h 27' 22"	
216	Joscelin Lowden	Great Britain	Uno-X Mobility	36	DNF-7	–	
217	Mie Bjørndal Ottestad	Norway	Uno-X Mobility	26	24	+ 32' 38"	

=== By team ===
(Netherlands) Team SD Worx–Protime (SDW)
No.	Rider	Pos.
1	Lotte Kopecky (BEL)	2
2	Elena Cecchini (ITA)	71
3	Niamh Fisher-Black (NZL)	10
4	Femke Gerritse (NED)	46
5	Barbara Guarischi (ITA)	100
6	Chantal van den Broek-Blaak (NED)	DNF-7
7	Blanka Vas (HUN)	41

(Belgium) AG Insurance–Soudal (AGS)
No.	Rider	Pos.
11	Kimberley Le Court (MRI)	18
12	Julia Borgström (SWE)	DNF-7
13	Lore De Schepper (BEL)	47
14	Justine Ghekiere (BEL)	32
15	Marthe Goossens (BEL)	DNF-7
16	Gaia Masetti (ITA)	48
17	Maud Rijnbeek (NED)	DNF-7

(Italy) Bepink–Bongioanni (BPK)
No.	Rider	Pos.
21	Monica Trinca Colonel (ITA)	23
22	Andrea Casagranda (ITA)	96
23	Carmela Cipriani (ITA)	64
24	Ana Vitória Magalhães (BRA)	73
25	Nora Jenčušová (SVK)	90
26	Angela Oro (ITA)	93
27	Elisa Valtulini (ITA)	29

(Germany) Canyon–SRAM (CSR)
No.	Rider	Pos.
31	Elise Chabbey (SUI)	DNS-7
32	Neve Bradbury (AUS)	3
33	Antonia Niedermaier (GER)	6
34	Soraya Paladin (ITA)	52
35	Agnieszka Skalniak-Sójka (POL)	50
36	Alice Towers (GBR)	DNF-4
37	Maike van der Duin (NED)	DNF-6

(Germany) Ceratizit–WNT Pro Cycling (WNT)
No.	Rider	Pos.
41	Cédrine Kerbaol (FRA)	DNF-4
42	Alice Maria Arzuffi (ITA)	17
43	Laura Asencio (FRA)	31
44	Mylène de Zoete (NED)	99
45	Arianna Fidanza (ITA)	82
46	Marta Jaskulska (POL)	81
47	Kathrin Schweinberger (AUT)	92

(France) Cofidis (COF)
No.	Rider	Pos.
51	Hannah Ludwig (GER)	45
52	Martina Alzini (ITA)	DNF-7
53	Julie Bego (FRA)	DNF-5
54	Morgane Coston (FRA)	83
55	Séverine Eraud (FRA)	DNF-5
56	Nikola Nosková (CZE)	DNF-7
57	Sarah Roy (AUS)	70

(United States) EF Education–Cannondale (EFC)
No.	Rider	Pos.
61	Kim Cadzow (NZL)	DNF-7
63	Letizia Borghesi (ITA)	DNF-7
64	Clara Emond (CAN)	DNF-7
65	Nina Kessler (NED)	DNS-6
66	Clara Koppenburg (GER)	68
67	Magdeleine Vallieres (CAN)	38

(France) FDJ–Suez (FST)
No.	Rider	Pos.
71	Cecilie Uttrup Ludwig (DEN)	8
72	Loes Adegeest (NED)	62
73	Grace Brown (AUS)	34
74	Nina Buijsman (NED)	27
75	Vittoria Guazzini (ITA)	DNS-7
76	Alessia Vigilia (ITA)	77
77	Jade Wiel (FRA)	DNS-6

(Netherlands) Fenix–Deceuninck (FED)
No.	Rider	Pos.
81	Pauliena Rooijakkers (NED)	4
82	Aniek van Alphen (NED)	76
83	Ceylin del Carmen Alvarado (NED)	58
84	Sanne Cant (BEL)	37
85	Millie Couzens (GBR)	DNF-6
86	Evy Kuijpers (NED)	95
87	Greta Marturano (ITA)	DNF-7

(United States) Human Powered Health (HPH)
No.	Rider	Pos.
91	Ruth Edwards (USA)	30
92	Giada Borghesi (ITA)	DNF-7
93	Romy Kasper (GER)	60
94	Barbara Malcotti (ITA)	15
95	Katia Ragusa (ITA)	80
96	Silvia Zanardi (ITA)	91
97	Linda Zanetti (SUI)	87

(Italy) Isolmant–Premac–Vittoria (SBT)
No.	Rider	Pos.
101	Beatrice Rossato (ITA)	63
102	Sofia Arici (ITA)	98
103	Valeria Curnis (ITA)	DNF-6
104	Sara Mazzorana (ITA)	DNF-5
105	Sara Pepoli (ITA)	86
106	Emanuela Zanetti (ITA)	DNF-6
107	Asia Zontone (ITA)	88

(Spain) Laboral Kutxa–Fundación Euskadi (LKF)
No.	Rider	Pos.
111	Ane Santesteban (ESP)	21
112	Usoa Ostolaza (ESP)	16
113	Nadia Quagliotto (ITA)	67
114	Aileen Schweikart (GER)	53
115	Debora Silvestri (ITA)	25
116	Laura Tomasi (ITA)	DNF-8
117	Cristina Tonetti (ITA)	84

(United States) Lidl–Trek (LTK)
No.	Rider	Pos.
121	Elisa Longo Borghini (ITA)	1
122	Elisa Balsamo (ITA)	DNF-5
123	Lucinda Brand (NED)	57
124	Brodie Chapman (AUS)	22
125	Elizabeth Deignan (GBR)	55
126	Lauretta Hanson (AUS)	74
127	Gaia Realini (ITA)	7

(Australia) Liv AlUla Jayco (LAJ)
No.	Rider	Pos.
131	Mavi García (ESP)	9
132	Ingvild Gåskjenn (NOR)	DNF-6
133	Amber Pate (AUS)	75
134	Ruby Roseman-Gannon (AUS)	65
135	Silke Smulders (NED)	13
136	Ella Wyllie (NZL)	40
137	Urška Žigart (SLO)	12

(Spain) Movistar Team (MOV)
No.	Rider	Pos.
141	Arlenis Sierra (CUB)	56
142	Jelena Erić (SRB)	66
143	Liane Lippert (GER)	DNF-8
144	Sara Martín (ESP)	54
145	Mareille Meijering (NED)	11
146	Paula Patiño (COL)	DNF-7
147	Claire Steels (GBR)	26

(Switzerland) Roland (CGS)
No.	Rider	Pos.
151	Elena Hartmann (SUI)	DNF-4
152	Antri Christoforou (CYP)	DNF-6
153	Sofia Collinelli (ITA)	DNF-7
154	Nathalie Eklund (SWE)	89
155	Nguyễn Thị Thật (VIE)	DNF-7
156	Elena Pirrone (ITA)	DNS-6
157	Giorgia Vettorello (ITA)	59

(Uzbekistan) Tashkent City Women Professional Cycling Team (TCW)
No.	Rider	Pos.
161	Olga Zabelinskaya (UZB)	DNF-7
162	Mohinabonu Elmurodova (UZB)	DNF-6
163	Madina Kakhorova (UZB)	DNF-6
164	Nafosat Kozieva (UZB)	DNF-6
165	Anna Kuskova (UZB)	DNF-3
166	Yanina Kuskova (UZB)	85
167	Margarita Misyurina (UZB)	DNF-6

(Netherlands) Team dsm–firmenich PostNL (DFP)
No.	Rider	Pos.
171	Juliette Labous (FRA)	5
172	Francesca Barale (ITA)	51
173	Eleonora Ciabocco (ITA)	DNF-8
174	Franziska Koch (GER)	49
175	Josie Nelson (GBR)	97
176	Becky Storrie (GBR)	DNF-4
177	Nienke Vinke (NED)	43

(Netherlands) Visma–Lease a Bike (TVL)
No.	Rider	Pos.
181	Fem van Empel (NED)	DNF-5
182	Carlijn Achtereekte (NED)	69
183	Femke de Vries (NED)	20
184	Mijntje Geurts (NED)	DNS-4
185	Lieke Nooijen (NED)	42
186	Maud Oudeman (NED)	DNS-7
187	Rosita Reijnhout (NED)	DNS-5

(Italy) Top Girls Fassa Bortolo (TOP)
No.	Rider	Pos.
191	Giorgia Bariani (ITA)	DNF-6
192	Virginia Bortoli (ITA)	DNF-7
193	Alessia Missiaggia (ITA)	102
194	Iris Monticolo (ITA)	DNF-8
195	Alice Palazzi (ITA)	101
196	Elisa De Vallier (ITA)	79
197	Gaia Segato (ITA)	39

(United Arab Emirates) UAE Team ADQ (UAD)
No.	Rider	Pos.
201	Chiara Consonni (ITA)	DNS-7
202	Alena Amialiusik	72
203	Eleonora Gasparrini (ITA)	35
204	Elizabeth Holden (GBR)	78
205	Erica Magnaldi (ITA)	14
206	Silvia Persico (ITA)	36
207	Dominika Włodarczyk (POL)	28

(Norway) Uno-X Mobility (UXM)
No.	Rider	Pos.
211	Anouska Koster (NED)	44
212	Katrine Aalerud (NOR)	33
213	Solbjørk Minke Anderson (DEN)	19
214	Marte Berg Edseth (NOR)	61
215	Rebecca Koerner (NOR)	94
216	Joscelin Lowden (GBR)	DNF-7
217	Mie Bjørndal Ottestad (NOR)	24

=== By nationality ===
Country	No. of riders	Finished	Stage wins
Australia	7	7	1 (Neve Bradbury)
Austria	1	1	
Belgium	5	4	1 (Lotte Kopecky)
Brazil	1	1	
Canada	2	1	1 (Clara Emond)
Colombia	1	0	
Cuba	1	1	
Cyprus	1	0	
Czechia	1	0	
Denmark	3	3	
France	7	3	
Germany	7	6	1 (Liane Lippert)
Great Britain	8	4	
Hungary	1	1	
Italy	50	33	2 (Chiara Consonni, Elisa Longo Borghini)
Mauritius	1	1	1 (Kimberley Le Court)
Netherlands	24	16	
New Zealand	3	2	1 (Niamh Fisher-Black)
Norway	4	3	
Poland	3	3	
Serbia	1	1	
Slovakia	1	1	
Slovenia	1	1	
Spain	4	4	
Sweden	2	1	
Switzerland	3	1	
United States	1	1	
Uzbekistan	7	1	
Vietnam	1	0	
	1	1	
Total	153	102	8
