= List of teams and cyclists in the 2024 La Vuelta Femenina =

List of cyclists

The following is a list of teams and cyclists who will participate in the 2024 La Vuelta Femenina.

== Teams ==
Thirteen UCI Women's WorldTeams and eight UCI Women's Continental Teams will be participating in the race.

UCI Women's WorldTeams

- AG Insurance–Soudal
- Canyon//SRAM
- FDJ–Suez
- Fenix–Deceuninck
- Human Powered Health
- Lidl–Trek
- Liv AlUla Jayco
- Movistar Team
- Roland
- Team dsm–firmenich PostNL
- Team SD Worx–Protime
- Visma–Lease a Bike
- UAE Team ADQ

UCI Women's Continental Teams

- Bepink–Bongioanni
- EF Education–Cannondale
- Eneicat–CMTeam
- Laboral Kutxa–Fundación Euskadi
- Lotto–Dstny Ladies
- Team Coop–Repsol
- VolkerWessels Women Cyclingteam
- Winspace

== Cyclists ==
Legend
| No. | Starting number worn by the rider during the race |
| Pos. | Position in the general classification |
| Time | Deficit to the winner of the general classification |
| | Denotes the winner of the general classification |
| | Denotes the winner of the points classification |
| | Denotes the winner of the mountains classification |
| | Denotes riders that represent the winner of the team classification |
| DNS | Denotes a rider who did not start a stage, followed by the stage before which she withdrew |
| DNF | Denotes a rider who did not finish a stage, followed by the stage in which she withdrew |
| DSQ | Denotes a rider who was disqualified from the race, followed by the stage in which this occurred |
| OTL | Denotes a rider finished outside the time limit, followed by the stage in which they did so |
Ages correct as of Sunday 28 April 2024, the date on which the race begins

=== By starting number ===
| No. | Name | Nationality | Team | Age | Pos. | Time | Ref. |
|---|---|---|---|---|---|---|---|
| 1 | Liane Lippert | Germany | Movistar Team | 26 | 31 | + 22' 51" | |
| 2 | Olivia Baril | Canada | Movistar Team | 26 | 30 | + 22' 31" | |
| 3 | Emma Norsgaard | Denmark | Movistar Team | 24 | DNF-3 | – | |
| 4 | Jelena Erić | Serbia | Movistar Team | 28 | 77 | + 1h 08' 14" | |
| 5 | Sheyla Gutiérrez | Spain | Movistar Team | 30 | 66 | + 1h 02' 16" | |
| 6 | Sara Martín | Spain | Movistar Team | 25 | DNS-8 | – | |
| 7 | Mareille Meijering | Netherlands | Movistar Team | 29 | 67 | + 1h 02' 38" | |
| 11 | Niamh Fisher-Black | New Zealand | Team SD Worx–Protime | 23 | 7 | + 5' 14" | |
| 12 | Mischa Bredewold | Netherlands | Team SD Worx–Protime | 23 | 40 | + 31' 12" | |
| 13 | Elena Cecchini | Italy | Team SD Worx–Protime | 31 | 56 | + 54' 35" | |
| 14 | Barbara Guarischi | Italy | Team SD Worx–Protime | 33 | 95 | + 1h 29' 03" | |
| 15 | Marlen Reusser | Switzerland | Team SD Worx–Protime | 32 | 13 | + 7' 15" | |
| 16 | Blanka Vas | Hungary | Team SD Worx–Protime | 22 | 57 | + 54' 52" | |
| 17 | Demi Vollering | Netherlands | Team SD Worx–Protime | 27 | 1 | 23h 30' 55" | |
| 21 | Elynor Bäckstedt | Great Britain | Lidl–Trek | 22 | 104 | + 1h 43' 34" | |
| 22 | Brodie Chapman | Australia | Lidl–Trek | 33 | 43 | + 35' 47" | |
| 23 | Elizabeth Deignan | Great Britain | Lidl–Trek | 35 | 58 | + 56' 15" | |
| 24 | Elisa Longo Borghini | Italy | Lidl–Trek | 32 | 3 | + 2' 00" | |
| 25 | Gaia Realini | Italy | Lidl–Trek | 22 | DNS-6 | – | |
| 26 | Amanda Spratt | Australia | Lidl–Trek | 36 | 18 | + 13' 30" | |
| 27 | Ellen van Dijk | Netherlands | Lidl–Trek | 37 | DNS-4 | – | |
| 31 | Neve Bradbury | Australia | Canyon//SRAM | 22 | DNS-1 | – | |
| 32 | Zoe Bäckstedt | Great Britain | Canyon//SRAM | 19 | 93 | + 1h 25' 59" | |
| 33 | Ricarda Bauernfeind | Germany | Canyon//SRAM | 24 | 6 | + 4' 33" | |
| 35 | Antonia Niedermaier | Germany | Canyon//SRAM | 21 | 11 | + 7' 08" | |
| 36 | Katarzyna Niewiadoma | Poland | Canyon//SRAM | 29 | DNS-6 | – | |
| 37 | Maike van der Duin | Netherlands | Canyon//SRAM | 22 | 86 | + 1h 19' 24" | |
| 41 | Mikayla Harvey | New Zealand | UAE Team ADQ | 25 | 49 | + 41' 02" | |
| 42 | Alena Amialiusik | | UAE Team ADQ | 35 | DNF-8 | – | |
| 43 | Eugenia Bujak | Slovenia | UAE Team ADQ | 34 | 60 | + 57' 39" | |
| 44 | Alena Ivanchenko | | UAE Team ADQ | 20 | 23 | + 17' 26" | |
| 45 | Erica Magnaldi | Italy | UAE Team ADQ | 31 | 15 | + 12' 17" | |
| 46 | Tereza Neumanova | Czechia | UAE Team ADQ | 25 | DNF-5 | – | |
| 47 | Karlijn Swinkels | Netherlands | UAE Team ADQ | 25 | 36 | + 26' 13" | |
| 51 | Juliette Labous | France | Team dsm–firmenich PostNL | 25 | 4 | + 2' 58" | |
| 52 | Rachele Barbieri | Italy | Team dsm–firmenich PostNL | 27 | 92 | + 1h 25' 33" | |
| 53 | Eleonora Ciabocco | Italy | Team dsm–firmenich PostNL | 20 | 44 | + 37' 22" | |
| 54 | Daniek Hengeveld | Netherlands | Team dsm–firmenich PostNL | 21 | 100 | + 1h 37' 10" | |
| 55 | Charlotte Kool | Netherlands | Team dsm–firmenich PostNL | 24 | 91 | + 1h 23' 52" | |
| 56 | Abi Smith | Great Britain | Team dsm–firmenich PostNL | 22 | 65 | + 1h 01' 09" | |
| 57 | Nienke Vinke | Netherlands | Team dsm–firmenich PostNL | 19 | 34 | + 24' 44" | |
| 61 | Marianne Vos | Netherlands | Visma–Lease a Bike | 36 | 24 | + 17' 51" | |
| 62 | Carlijn Achtereekte | Netherlands | Visma–Lease a Bike | 34 | 59 | + 57' 07" | |
| 63 | Anna Henderson | Great Britain | Visma–Lease a Bike | 25 | DNS-3 | – | |
| 64 | Riejanne Markus | Netherlands | Visma–Lease a Bike | 29 | 2 | + 1' 49" | |
| 65 | Maud Oudeman | Netherlands | Visma–Lease a Bike | 20 | 48 | + 40' 43" | |
| 66 | Eva van Agt | Netherlands | Visma–Lease a Bike | 27 | DNS-8 | – | |
| 67 | Sophie von Berswordt | Netherlands | Visma–Lease a Bike | 27 | 38 | + 28' 31" | |
| 71 | Évita Muzic | France | FDJ–Suez | 24 | 5 | + 3' 15" | |
| 72 | Grace Brown | Australia | FDJ–Suez | 31 | 17 | + 12' 47" | |
| 73 | Marta Cavalli | Italy | FDJ–Suez | 26 | DNS-3 | – | |
| 74 | Coralie Demay | France | FDJ–Suez | 31 | 73 | + 1h 07' 07" | |
| 75 | Vittoria Guazzini | Italy | FDJ–Suez | 23 | DNF-3 | – | |
| 76 | Amber Kraak | Netherlands | FDJ–Suez | 29 | 45 | + 37' 31" | |
| 77 | Alessia Vigilia | Italy | FDJ–Suez | 24 | 55 | + 53' 10" | |
| 81 | Yara Kastelijn | Netherlands | Fenix–Deceuninck | 26 | 8 | + 5' 27" | |
| 82 | Greta Marturano | Italy | Fenix–Deceuninck | 25 | 22 | + 17' 21" | |
| 83 | Flora Perkins | Great Britain | Fenix–Deceuninck | 20 | 61 | + 58' 11" | |
| 84 | Pauliena Rooijakkers | Netherlands | Fenix–Deceuninck | 30 | 9 | + 5' 42" | |
| 85 | Carina Schrempf | Austria | Fenix–Deceuninck | 29 | 75 | + 1h 07' 48" | |
| 86 | Petra Stiasny | Switzerland | Fenix–Deceuninck | 22 | 51 | + 46' 03" | |
| 87 | Aniek van Alphen | Netherlands | Fenix–Deceuninck | 25 | DNF-6 | – | |
| 91 | Debora Silvestri | Italy | Laboral Kutxa–Fundación Euskadi | 25 | DNS-7 | – | |
| 92 | Idoia Eraso | Spain | Laboral Kutxa–Fundación Euskadi | 22 | 114 | + 2h 02' 44" | |
| 93 | Lourdes Oyarbide | Spain | Laboral Kutxa–Fundación Euskadi | 30 | 107 | + 1h 47' 11" | |
| 94 | Nadia Quagliotto | Italy | Laboral Kutxa–Fundación Euskadi | 27 | 50 | + 45' 11" | |
| 95 | Aileen Schweikart | Germany | Laboral Kutxa–Fundación Euskadi | 28 | 25 | + 18' 47" | |
| 96 | Laura Tomasi | Italy | Laboral Kutxa–Fundación Euskadi | 24 | 64 | + 1h 01' 01" | |
| 97 | Cristina Tonetti | Italy | Laboral Kutxa–Fundación Euskadi | 21 | 88 | + 1h 21' 07" | |
| 101 | Mavi García | Spain | Liv AlUla Jayco | 40 | 20 | + 15' 57" | |
| 102 | Caroline Andersson | Sweden | Liv AlUla Jayco | 22 | 32 | + 24' 13" | |
| 103 | Georgia Baker | Australia | Liv AlUla Jayco | 29 | 81 | + 1h 15' 46" | |
| 104 | Teniel Campbell | Trinidad and Tobago | Liv AlUla Jayco | 26 | 83 | + 1h 16' 01" | |
| 105 | Ingvild Gåskjenn | Norway | Liv AlUla Jayco | 25 | 14 | + 10' 12" | |
| 106 | Georgie Howe | Australia | Liv AlUla Jayco | 30 | 109 | + 1h 50' 45" | |
| 107 | Silke Smulders | Netherlands | Liv AlUla Jayco | 23 | 21 | + 16' 41" | |
| 111 | Tamara Dronova | | Roland | 30 | 35 | + 26' 09" | |
| 112 | Antri Christoforou | Cyprus | Roland | 32 | 94 | + 1h 28' 13" | |
| 113 | Maggie Coles-Lyster | Canada | Roland | 25 | 96 | + 1h 31' 03" | |
| 114 | Natalie Grinczer | Great Britain | Roland | 30 | DNF-3 | – | |
| 115 | Elena Hartmann | Switzerland | Roland | 33 | DNF-5 | – | |
| 116 | Anna Kiesenhofer | Austria | Roland | 33 | 108 | + 1h 47' 25" | |
| 117 | Giorgia Vettorello | Italy | Roland | 23 | 69 | + 1h 04' 41" | |
| 121 | Sarah Gigante | Australia | AG Insurance–Soudal | 23 | 19 | + 14' 48" | |
| 122 | Mireia Benito | Spain | AG Insurance–Soudal | 27 | 41 | + 32' 16" | |
| 123 | Justine Ghekiere | Belgium | AG Insurance–Soudal | 27 | DNS-4 | – | |
| 124 | Anya Louw | Australia | AG Insurance–Soudal | 23 | 85 | + 1h 18' 43" | |
| 125 | Ilse Pluimers | Netherlands | AG Insurance–Soudal | 21 | 70 | + 1h 04' 45" | |
| 126 | Maud Rijnbeek | Netherlands | AG Insurance–Soudal | 21 | 72 | + 1h 05' 10" | |
| 127 | Julie Van de Velde | Belgium | AG Insurance–Soudal | 30 | DNF-8 | – | |
| 131 | Yuliia Biriukova | Ukraine | Human Powered Health | 26 | 68 | + 1h 03' 51" | |
| 132 | Henrietta Christie | New Zealand | Human Powered Health | 22 | 28 | + 22' 08" | |
| 134 | Romy Kasper | Germany | Human Powered Health | 35 | 62 | + 58' 32" | |
| 135 | Marit Raaijmakers | Netherlands | Human Powered Health | 24 | DNF-5 | – | |
| 136 | Lily Williams | United States | Human Powered Health | 29 | 54 | + 53' 00" | |
| 137 | Silvia Zanardi | Italy | Human Powered Health | 24 | 98 | + 1h 31' 53" | |
| 141 | Clara Emond | Canada | EF Education–Cannondale | 27 | DNS-3 | – | |
| 142 | Kim Cadzow | New Zealand | EF Education–Cannondale | 22 | 10 | + 6' 19" | |
| 143 | Veronica Ewers | United States | EF Education–Cannondale | 29 | 46 | + 37' 42" | |
| 144 | Kristen Faulkner | United States | EF Education–Cannondale | 31 | 12 | + 7' 14" | |
| 145 | Alison Jackson | Canada | EF Education–Cannondale | 35 | 63 | + 58' 44" | |
| 146 | Clara Koppenburg | Germany | EF Education–Cannondale | 28 | 39 | + 30' 46" | |
| 147 | Magdeleine Vallieres | Canada | EF Education–Cannondale | 22 | 29 | + 22' 29" | |
| 151 | Laura Molenaar | Netherlands | VolkerWessels Women Cyclingteam | 22 | 84 | + 1h 18' 02" | |
| 152 | Valerie Demay | Belgium | VolkerWessels Women Cyclingteam | 30 | 52 | + 46' 08" | |
| 153 | Anneke Dijkstra | Netherlands | VolkerWessels Women Cyclingteam | 26 | 33 | + 24' 31" | |
| 154 | Eline Jansen | Netherlands | VolkerWessels Women Cyclingteam | 22 | 27 | + 21' 38" | |
| 155 | Quinty Schoens | Netherlands | VolkerWessels Women Cyclingteam | 25 | 37 | + 27' 37" | |
| 156 | Sabrina Stultiens | Netherlands | VolkerWessels Women Cyclingteam | 30 | DNS-3 | – | |
| 157 | Marith Vanhove | Belgium | VolkerWessels Women Cyclingteam | 21 | DNF-4 | – | |
| 161 | Thalita de Jong | Netherlands | Lotto–Dstny Ladies | 30 | 16 | + 12' 34" | |
| 162 | Wilma Aintala | Finland | Lotto–Dstny Ladies | 20 | 80 | + 1h 15' 17" | |
| 163 | Maureen Arens | Netherlands | Lotto–Dstny Ladies | 21 | 102 | + 1h 40' 23" | |
| 164 | Fauve Bastiaenssen | Belgium | Lotto–Dstny Ladies | 26 | 101 | + 1h 40' 02" | |
| 165 | Audrey De Keersmaeker | Belgium | Lotto–Dstny Ladies | 24 | 97 | + 1h 31' 42" | |
| 166 | Mieke Docx | Belgium | Lotto–Dstny Ladies | 27 | 113 | + 1h 59' 37" | |
| 167 | Esmée Gielkens | Belgium | Lotto–Dstny Ladies | 22 | 99 | + 1h 33' 05" | |
| 171 | Andrea Alzate | Colombia | Eneicat–CMTeam | 27 | DNF-7 | – | |
| 172 | Valentina Basilico | Italy | Eneicat–CMTeam | 21 | 105 | + 1h 45' 09" | |
| 173 | Daniela Campos | Portugal | Eneicat–CMTeam | 22 | 74 | + 1h 07' 22" | |
| 174 | Ariana Gilabert | Spain | Eneicat–CMTeam | 24 | 78 | + 1h 09' 10" | |
| 175 | Adèle Normand | Canada | Eneicat–CMTeam | 22 | DNF-3 | – | |
| 176 | Claudia San Justo | Spain | Eneicat–CMTeam | 20 | 116 | + 2h 24' 33" | |
| 177 | Carolina Vargas | Colombia | Eneicat–CMTeam | 21 | DNF-8 | – | |
| 181 | Monica Trinca Colonel | Italy | Bepink–Bongioanni | 24 | 26 | + 21' 02" | |
| 182 | Andrea Casagranda | Italy | Bepink–Bongioanni | 19 | 87 | + 1h 20' 30" | |
| 183 | Selene Colombi | Italy | Bepink–Bongioanni | 33 | DNS-4 | – | |
| 184 | Ana Vitória Magalhães | Brazil | Bepink–Bongioanni | 23 | 89 | + 1h 22' 13" | |
| 185 | Nora Jenčušová | Slovakia | Bepink–Bongioanni | 22 | 90 | + 1h 23' 20" | |
| 186 | Angela Oro | Italy | Bepink–Bongioanni | 21 | 110 | + 1h 51' 38" | |
| 187 | Beatrice Pozzobon | Italy | Bepink–Bongioanni | 22 | 115 | + 2h 05' 55" | |
| 191 | Karolina Perekitko | Poland | Winspace | 25 | 42 | + 34' 18" | |
| 192 | Noémi Abgrall | France | Winspace | 24 | 71 | + 1h 04' 51" | |
| 193 | Marine Allione | France | Winspace | 23 | 53 | + 51' 33" | |
| 194 | Floraine Bernard | France | Winspace | 21 | DNF-3 | – | |
| 195 | Aurela Nerlo | Poland | Winspace | 26 | 111 | + 1h 51' 47" | |
| 196 | Tang Xin | China | Winspace | 23 | 112 | + 1h 52' 49" | |
| 197 | Constance Valentin | France | Winspace | 26 | 106 | + 1h 45' 50" | |
| 201 | India Grangier | France | Team Coop–Repsol | 24 | DNF-3 | – | |
| 202 | Camilla Rånes Bye | Norway | Team Coop–Repsol | 19 | DNS-6 | – | |
| 203 | Stine Dale | Norway | Team Coop–Repsol | 25 | 79 | + 1h 15' 08" | |
| 204 | Sigrid Ytterhus Haugset | Norway | Team Coop–Repsol | 25 | 47 | + 37' 52" | |
| 205 | Stina Kagevi | Sweden | Team Coop–Repsol | 18 | 76 | + 1h 07' 57" | |
| 206 | Magdalene Lind | Norway | Team Coop–Repsol | 21 | 82 | + 1h 15' 51" | |
| 207 | Eline van Rooijen | Netherlands | Team Coop–Repsol | 22 | 103 | + 1h 40' 25" | |

=== By team ===
(Spain) Movistar Team (MOV)
| No. | Rider | Pos. |
|---|---|---|
| 1 | Liane Lippert (GER) | 31 |
| 2 | Olivia Baril (CAN) | 30 |
| 3 | Emma Norsgaard (DEN) | DNF-3 |
| 4 | Jelena Erić (SRB) | 77 |
| 5 | Sheyla Gutiérrez (ESP) | 66 |
| 6 | Sara Martín (ESP) | DNS-8 |
| 7 | Mareille Meijering (NED) | 67 |

(Netherlands) Team SD Worx–Protime (SDW)
| No. | Rider | Pos. |
|---|---|---|
| 11 | Niamh Fisher-Black (NZL) | 7 |
| 12 | Mischa Bredewold (NED) | 40 |
| 13 | Elena Cecchini (ITA) | 56 |
| 14 | Barbara Guarischi (ITA) | 95 |
| 15 | Marlen Reusser (SUI) | 13 |
| 16 | Blanka Vas (HUN) | 57 |
| 17 | Demi Vollering (NED) | 1 |

(United States) Lidl–Trek (LTK)
| No. | Rider | Pos. |
|---|---|---|
| 21 | Elynor Bäckstedt (GBR) | 104 |
| 22 | Brodie Chapman (AUS) | 43 |
| 23 | Elizabeth Deignan (GBR) | 58 |
| 24 | Elisa Longo Borghini (ITA) | 3 |
| 25 | Gaia Realini (ITA) | DNS-6 |
| 26 | Amanda Spratt (AUS) | 18 |
| 27 | Ellen van Dijk (NED) | DNS-4 |

(Germany) Canyon//SRAM (CSR)
| No. | Rider | Pos. |
|---|---|---|
| 31 | Neve Bradbury (AUS) | DNS-1 |
| 32 | Zoe Bäckstedt (GBR) | 93 |
| 33 | Ricarda Bauernfeind (GER) | 6 |
| 35 | Antonia Niedermaier (GER) | 11 |
| 36 | Katarzyna Niewiadoma (POL) | DNS-6 |
| 37 | Maike van der Duin (NED) | 86 |

(United Arab Emirates) UAE Team ADQ (UAD)
| No. | Rider | Pos. |
|---|---|---|
| 41 | Mikayla Harvey (NZL) | 49 |
| 42 | Alena Amialiusik | DNF-8 |
| 43 | Eugenia Bujak (SLO) | 60 |
| 44 | Alena Ivanchenko | 23 |
| 45 | Erica Magnaldi (ITA) | 15 |
| 46 | Tereza Neumanova (CZE) | DNF-5 |
| 47 | Karlijn Swinkels (NED) | 36 |

(Netherlands) Team dsm–firmenich PostNL (DFP)
| No. | Rider | Pos. |
|---|---|---|
| 51 | Juliette Labous (NED) | 4 |
| 52 | Rachele Barbieri (ITA) | 92 |
| 53 | Eleonora Ciabocco (ITA) | 44 |
| 54 | Daniek Hengeveld (NED) | 100 |
| 55 | Charlotte Kool (NED) | 91 |
| 56 | Abi Smith (GBR) | 65 |
| 57 | Nienke Vinke (NED) | 34 |

(Netherlands) Visma–Lease a Bike (TVL)
| No. | Rider | Pos. |
|---|---|---|
| 61 | Marianne Vos (NED) | 24 |
| 62 | Carlijn Achtereekte (NED) | 59 |
| 63 | Anna Henderson (GBR) | DNS-3 |
| 64 | Riejanne Markus (NED) | 2 |
| 65 | Maud Oudeman (NED) | 48 |
| 66 | Eva van Agt (NED) | DNS-8 |
| 67 | Sophie von Berswordt (NED) | 38 |

(France) FDJ–Suez (FST)
| No. | Rider | Pos. |
|---|---|---|
| 71 | Évita Muzic (FRA) | 5 |
| 72 | Grace Brown (AUS) | 17 |
| 73 | Marta Cavalli (ITA) | DNS-3 |
| 74 | Coralie Demay (FRA) | 73 |
| 75 | Vittoria Guazzini (ITA) | DNF-3 |
| 76 | Amber Kraak (NED) | 45 |
| 77 | Alessia Vigilia (ITA) | 55 |

(Belgium) Fenix–Deceuninck (FED)
| No. | Rider | Pos. |
|---|---|---|
| 81 | Yara Kastelijn (NED) | 8 |
| 82 | Greta Marturano (ITA) | 22 |
| 83 | Flora Perkins (GBR) | 61 |
| 84 | Pauliena Rooijakkers (NED) | 9 |
| 85 | Carina Schrempf (AUT) | 75 |
| 86 | Petra Stiasny (SUI) | 51 |
| 87 | Aniek van Alphen (NED) | DNF-6 |

(Spain) Laboral Kutxa–Fundación Euskadi (LKF)
| No. | Rider | Pos. |
|---|---|---|
| 91 | Debora Silvestri (ITA) | DNS-7 |
| 92 | Idoia Eraso (ESP) | 114 |
| 93 | Lourdes Oyarbide (ESP) | 107 |
| 94 | Nadia Quagliotto (ITA) | 50 |
| 95 | Aileen Schweikart (GER) | 25 |
| 96 | Laura Tomasi (ITA) | 64 |
| 97 | Cristina Tonetti (ITA) | 88 |

(Australia) Liv AlUla Jayco (LAJ)
| No. | Rider | Pos. |
|---|---|---|
| 101 | Mavi García (ESP) | 20 |
| 102 | Caroline Andersson (SWE) | 32 |
| 103 | Georgia Baker (AUS) | 81 |
| 104 | Teniel Campbell (TTO) | 83 |
| 105 | Ingvild Gåskjenn (NOR) | 14 |
| 106 | Georgie Howe (AUS) | 109 |
| 107 | Silke Smulders (NED) | 21 |

(Switzerland) Roland (CGS)
| No. | Rider | Pos. |
|---|---|---|
| 111 | Tamara Dronova | 35 |
| 112 | Antri Christoforou (CYP) | 94 |
| 113 | Maggie Coles-Lyster (CAN) | 96 |
| 114 | Natalie Grinczer (GBR) | DNF-3 |
| 115 | Elena Hartmann (SUI) | DNF-5 |
| 116 | Anna Kiesenhofer (AUT) | 108 |
| 117 | Giorgia Vettorello (ITA) | 69 |

(Belgium) AG Insurance–Soudal (AGS)
| No. | Rider | Pos. |
|---|---|---|
| 121 | Sarah Gigante (AUS) | 19 |
| 122 | Mireia Benito (ESP) | 41 |
| 123 | Justine Ghekiere (BEL) | DNS-4 |
| 124 | Anya Louw (AUS) | 85 |
| 125 | Ilse Pluimers (NED) | 70 |
| 126 | Maud Rijnbeek (NED) | 72 |
| 127 | Julie Van de Velde (BEL) | DNF-8 |

(United States) Human Powered Health (HPH)
| No. | Rider | Pos. |
|---|---|---|
| 131 | Yuliia Biriukova (UKR) | 68 |
| 132 | Henrietta Christie (NZL) | 28 |
| 134 | Romy Kasper (GER) | 62 |
| 135 | Marit Raaijmakers (NED) | DNF-5 |
| 136 | Lily Williams (USA) | 54 |
| 137 | Silvia Zanardi (ITA) | 98 |

(United States) EF Education–Cannondale (EFC)
| No. | Rider | Pos. |
|---|---|---|
| 141 | Clara Emond (CAN) | DNS-3 |
| 142 | Kim Cadzow (NZL) | 10 |
| 143 | Veronica Ewers (USA) | 46 |
| 144 | Kristen Faulkner (USA) | 12 |
| 145 | Alison Jackson (CAN) | 63 |
| 146 | Clara Koppenburg (GER) | 39 |
| 147 | Magdeleine Vallieres (CAN) | 29 |

(Netherlands) VolkerWessels Women Cyclingteam (VWT)
| No. | Rider | Pos. |
|---|---|---|
| 151 | Laura Molenaar (NED) | 84 |
| 152 | Valerie Demey (BEL) | 52 |
| 153 | Anneke Dijkstra (NED) | 33 |
| 154 | Eline Jansen (NED) | 27 |
| 155 | Quinty Schoens (NED) | 37 |
| 156 | Sabrina Stultiens (NED) | DNS-3 |
| 157 | Marith Vanhove (BEL) | DNF-4 |

(Belgium) Lotto–Dstny Ladies (LDL)
| No. | Rider | Pos. |
|---|---|---|
| 161 | Thalita de Jong (NED) | 16 |
| 162 | Wilma Aintila (FIN) | 80 |
| 163 | Maureen Arens (NED) | 102 |
| 164 | Fauve Bastiaenssen (BEL) | 101 |
| 165 | Audrey De Keersmaker (BEL) | 97 |
| 166 | Mieke Docx (BEL) | 113 |
| 167 | Esmée Gielkens (BEL) | 99 |

(Spain) Eneicat–CMTeam (EIC)
| No. | Rider | Pos. |
|---|---|---|
| 171 | Andrea Alzate (COL) | DNF-7 |
| 172 | Valentina Basilico (ITA) | 105 |
| 173 | Daniela Campos (POR) | 74 |
| 174 | Ariana Gilabert (ESP) | 78 |
| 175 | Adèle Normand (CAN) | DNF-3 |
| 176 | Claudia San Justo (ESP) | 116 |
| 177 | Carolina Vargas (COL) | DNF-8 |

(Italy) Bepink–Bongioanni (BPK)
| No. | Rider | Pos. |
|---|---|---|
| 181 | Monica Trinca Colonel (ITA) | 26 |
| 182 | Andrea Casagranda (ITA) | 87 |
| 183 | Selene Colombi (ITA) | DNS-4 |
| 184 | Ana Vitória Magalhães (BRA) | 89 |
| 185 | Nora Jenčušová (SVK) | 90 |
| 186 | Angela Oro (ITA) | 110 |
| 187 | Beatrice Pozzobon (ITA) | 115 |

(France) Winspace (WIN)
| No. | Rider | Pos. |
|---|---|---|
| 191 | Karolina Perekitko (POL) | 42 |
| 192 | Noémie Abgrall (FRA) | 71 |
| 193 | Marine Allione (FRA) | 53 |
| 194 | Floraine Bernard (FRA) | DNF-3 |
| 195 | Aurela Nerlo (POL) | 111 |
| 196 | Tang Xin (CHN) | 112 |
| 197 | Constance Valentin (FRA) | 106 |

(Norway) Team Coop–Repsol (HPU)
| No. | Rider | Pos. |
|---|---|---|
| 201 | India Grangier (FRA) | DNF-3 |
| 202 | Camilla Rånes Bye (NOR) | DNS-6 |
| 203 | Stine Dale (NOR) | 79 |
| 204 | Sigrid Ytterhus Haugset (NOR) | 47 |
| 205 | Stina Kagevi (SWE) | 76 |
| 206 | Magdalene Lind (NOR) | 82 |
| 207 | Eline van Rooijen (NED) | 103 |

=== By nationality ===
| Country | No. of riders | Finishers | Stage wins |
|---|---|---|---|
| Australia | 8 | 7 | |
| Austria | 2 | 2 | |
| Belgium | 8 | 5 | |
| Brazil | 1 | 1 | |
| Canada | 6 | 4 | 1 (Alison Jackson) |
| China | 1 | 1 | |
| Colombia | 2 | 0 | |
| Cyprus | 1 | 1 | |
| Czechia | 1 | 0 | |
| Denmark | 1 | 0 | |
| Finland | 1 | 1 | |
| France | 8 | 6 | 1 (Évita Muzic) |
| Germany | 6 | 6 | |
| Great Britain | 7 | 5 | |
| Hungary | 1 | 1 | |
| Italy | 23 | 18 | |
| Netherlands | 31 | 26 | 4 (Demi Vollering x2, Marianne Vos x2) |
| New Zealand | 4 | 4 | |
| Norway | 5 | 4 | |
| Poland | 3 | 2 | |
| Portugal | 1 | 1 | |
| Serbia | 1 | 1 | |
| Slovakia | 1 | 1 | |
| Slovenia | 1 | 1 | |
| Spain | 8 | 7 | |
| Sweden | 2 | 2 | |
| Switzerland | 3 | 2 | |
| Trinidad and Tobago | 1 | 1 | |
| Ukraine | 1 | 1 | |
| United States | 3 | 3 | 1 (Kristen Faulkner) |
| | 3 | 2 | |
| Total | 145 | 116 | 7 |
