= 2024 Giro d'Italia Women, Stage 1 to Stage 8 =

Cycling race stages

The 2024 Giro d'Italia Women was the 35th edition of the Giro d'Italia Women, a women's road cycling stage race in Italy. The race took place from 7 to 14 July 2024 and was the 21st race in the 2024 UCI Women's World Tour calendar. The race was organised by RCS Sport, which also organised the men's Giro d'Italia.

== Overview ==
Stage characteristics
Stage	Date	Course	Distance	Type	Winner
1	7 July	Brescia	15.7 km (9.8 mi)	Individual time trial	Elisa Longo Borghini (ITA)
2	8 July	Sirmione to Volta Mantovana	110 km (68 mi)	Flat stage	Chiara Consonni (ITA)
3	9 July	Sabbioneta to Toano	113 km (70 mi)	Hilly stage	Niamh Fisher-Black (NZL)
4	10 July	Imola to Urbino	134 km (83 mi)	Hilly stage	Clara Emond (CAN)
5	11 July	Frontone to Foligno	108 km (67 mi)	Hilly stage	Lotte Kopecky (BEL)
6	12 July	San Benedetto del Tronto to Chieti	159 km (99 mi)	Hilly stage	Liane Lippert (GER)
7	13 July	Lanciano to Blockhaus	120 km (75 mi)	Mountain stage	Neve Bradbury (AUS)
8	14 July	Pescara to L'Aquila	117 km (73 mi)	Mountain stage	Kimberley Le Court (MRI)
Total			876.7 km (544.8 mi)		

== Classification standings ==
Legend
Denotes the leader of the general classification	Denotes the leader of the mountains classification
Denotes the leader of the points classification	Denotes the leader of the young rider classification

== Stage 1 ==
7 July 2024 — Brescia, 15.7 km (9.8 mi) (ITT)

Stage 1 Result
Rank	Rider	Team	Time
1	Elisa Longo Borghini (ITA)	Lidl–Trek	20' 37"
2	Grace Brown (AUS)	FDJ–Suez	+ 1"
3	Brodie Chapman (AUS)	Lidl–Trek	+ 13"
4	Lieke Nooijen (NED)	Visma–Lease a Bike	+ 23"
5	Lotte Kopecky (BEL)	Team SD Worx–Protime	+ 25"
6	Elena Hartmann (SUI)	Roland	+ 28"
7	Juliette Labous (FRA)	Team dsm–firmenich PostNL	+ 29"
8	Ruth Edwards (USA)	Human Powered Health	+ 30"
9	Cédrine Kerbaol (FRA)	Ceratizit–WNT Pro Cycling	+ 38"
10	Loes Adegeest (NED)	FDJ–Suez	+ 38"

General classification after Stage 1
Rank	Rider	Team	Time
1	Elisa Longo Borghini (ITA)	Lidl–Trek	20' 37"
2	Grace Brown (AUS)	FDJ–Suez	+ 1"
3	Brodie Chapman (AUS)	Lidl–Trek	+ 13"
4	Lieke Nooijen (NED)	Visma–Lease a Bike	+ 23"
5	Lotte Kopecky (BEL)	Team SD Worx–Protime	+ 25"
6	Elena Hartmann (SUI)	Roland	+ 28"
7	Juliette Labous (FRA)	Team dsm–firmenich PostNL	+ 29"
8	Ruth Edwards (USA)	Human Powered Health	+ 30"
9	Cédrine Kerbaol (FRA)	Ceratizit–WNT Pro Cycling	+ 38"
10	Loes Adegeest (NED)	FDJ–Suez	+ 38"

== Stage 2 ==
8 July 2024 — Sirmione to Volta Mantovana, 110 km (68 mi)

Stage 2 Result
Rank	Rider	Team	Time
1	Chiara Consonni (ITA)	UAE Team ADQ	2h 41' 58"
2	Lotte Kopecky (BEL)	Team SD Worx–Protime	+ 0"
3	Elisa Balsamo (ITA)	Lidl–Trek	+ 0"
4	Arlenis Sierra (CUB)	Movistar Team	+ 0"
5	Mylène de Zoete (NED)	Ceratizit–WNT Pro Cycling	+ 0"
6	Kimberley Le Court (MRI)	AG Insurance–Soudal	+ 0"
7	Silvia Zanardi (ITA)	Human Powered Health	+ 0"
8	Letizia Borghesi (ITA)	EF Education–Cannondale	+ 0"
9	Elisa Longo Borghini (ITA)	Lidl–Trek	+ 0"
10	Kathrin Schweinberger (AUT)	Ceratizit–WNT Pro Cycling	+ 0"

General classification after Stage 2
Rank	Rider	Team	Time
1	Elisa Longo Borghini (ITA)	Lidl–Trek	3h 02' 25"
2	Grace Brown (AUS)	FDJ–Suez	+ 1"
3	Brodie Chapman (AUS)	Lidl–Trek	+ 13"
4	Lotte Kopecky (BEL)	Team SD Worx–Protime	+ 19"
5	Juliette Labous (FRA)	Team dsm–firmenich PostNL	+ 29"
6	Ruth Edwards (USA)	Human Powered Health	+ 30"
7	Cédrine Kerbaol (FRA)	Ceratizit–WNT Pro Cycling	+ 38"
8	Loes Adegeest (NED)	FDJ–Suez	+ 38"
9	Katrine Aalerud (NOR)	Uno-X Mobility	+ 45"
10	Franziska Koch (GER)	Team dsm–firmenich PostNL	+ 47"

== Stage 3 ==
9 July 2024 — Sabbioneta to Toano, 113 km (70 mi)

Stage 3 Result
Rank	Rider	Team	Time
1	Niamh Fisher-Black (NZL)	Team SD Worx–Protime	2h 49' 19"
2	Lotte Kopecky (BEL)	Team SD Worx–Protime	+ 6"
3	Juliette Labous (FRA)	Team dsm–firmenich PostNL	+ 6"
4	Elisa Longo Borghini (ITA)	Lidl–Trek	+ 6"
5	Pauliena Rooijakkers (NED)	Fenix–Deceuninck	+ 10"
6	Mavi García (ESP)	Liv AlUla Jayco	+ 12"
7	Neve Bradbury (AUS)	Canyon//SRAM	+ 14"
8	Cecilie Uttrup Ludwig (DEN)	FDJ–Suez	+ 14"
9	Antonia Niedermaier (GER)	Canyon//SRAM	+ 17"
10	Kimberley Le Court (MRI)	AG Insurance–Soudal	+ 24"

General classification after Stage 3
Rank	Rider	Team	Time
1	Elisa Longo Borghini (ITA)	Lidl–Trek	5h 52' 00"
2	Lotte Kopecky (BEL)	Team SD Worx–Protime	+ 13"
3	Juliette Labous (FRA)	Team dsm–firmenich PostNL	+ 25"
4	Antonia Niedermaier (GER)	Canyon//SRAM	+ 59"
5	Niamh Fisher-Black (NZL)	Team SD Worx–Protime	+ 1' 00"
6	Mavi García (ESP)	Liv AlUla Jayco	+ 1' 26"
7	Katrine Aalerud (NOR)	Uno-X Mobility	+ 1' 27"
8	Pauliena Rooijakkers (NED)	Fenix–Deceuninck	+ 1' 27"
9	Cecilie Uttrup Ludwig (DEN)	FDJ–Suez	+ 1' 30"
10	Kimberley Le Court (MRI)	AG Insurance–Soudal	+ 1' 31"

== Stage 4 ==
10 July 2024 — Imola to Urbino, 134 km (83 mi)

Stage 4 Result
Rank	Rider	Team	Time
1	Clara Emond (CAN)	EF Education–Cannondale	3h 35' 45"
2	Soraya Paladin (ITA)	Canyon//SRAM	+ 17"
3	Cecilie Uttrup Ludwig (DEN)	FDJ–Suez	+ 20"
4	Elise Chabbey (SUI)	Canyon//SRAM	+ 26"
5	Kimberley Le Court (MRI)	AG Insurance–Soudal	+ 28"
6	Giada Borghesi (ITA)	Human Powered Health	+ 35"
7	Jelena Erić (SRB)	Movistar Team	+ 41"
8	Elisa Longo Borghini (ITA)	Lidl–Trek	+ 1' 08"
9	Lotte Kopecky (BEL)	Team SD Worx–Protime	+ 1' 08"
10	Mie Bjørndal Ottestad (NOR)	Uno-X Mobility	+ 1' 12"

General classification after Stage 4
Rank	Rider	Team	Time
1	Elisa Longo Borghini (ITA)	Lidl–Trek	9h 28' 53"
2	Lotte Kopecky (BEL)	Team SD Worx–Protime	+ 13"
3	Cecilie Uttrup Ludwig (DEN)	FDJ–Suez	+ 38"
4	Juliette Labous (FRA)	Team dsm–firmenich PostNL	+ 49"
5	Kimberley Le Court (MRI)	AG Insurance–Soudal	+ 51"
6	Antonia Niedermaier (GER)	Canyon//SRAM	+ 1' 06"
7	Niamh Fisher-Black (NZL)	Team SD Worx–Protime	+ 1' 07"
8	Mavi García (ESP)	Liv AlUla Jayco	+ 1' 33"
9	Katrine Aalerud (NOR)	Uno-X Mobility	+ 1' 34"
10	Pauliena Rooijakkers (NED)	Fenix–Deceuninck	+ 1' 34"

== Stage 5 ==
11 July 2024 — Frontone to Foligno, 108 km (67 mi)

Stage 5 Result
Rank	Rider	Team	Time
1	Lotte Kopecky (BEL)	Team SD Worx–Protime	2h 38' 54"
2	Chiara Consonni (ITA)	UAE Team ADQ	+ 0"
3	Arlenis Sierra (CUB)	Movistar Team	+ 0"
4	Kathrin Schweinberger (AUT)	Ceratizit–WNT Pro Cycling	+ 0"
5	Barbara Guarischi (ITA)	Team SD Worx–Protime	+ 0"
6	Vittoria Guazzini (ITA)	FDJ–Suez	+ 0"
7	Ruby Roseman-Gannon (NZL)	Liv AlUla Jayco	+ 0"
8	Martina Alzini (ITA)	Cofidis	+ 0"
9	Laura Tomasi (ITA)	Laboral Kutxa–Fundación Euskadi	+ 0"
10	Franziska Koch (GER)	Team dsm–firmenich PostNL	+ 0"

General classification after Stage 5
Rank	Rider	Team	Time
1	Elisa Longo Borghini (ITA)	Lidl–Trek	12h 07' 47"
2	Lotte Kopecky (BEL)	Team SD Worx–Protime	+ 3"
3	Cecilie Uttrup Ludwig (DEN)	FDJ–Suez	+ 38"
4	Juliette Labous (FRA)	Team dsm–firmenich PostNL	+ 49"
5	Kimberley Le Court (MRI)	AG Insurance–Soudal	+ 51"
6	Antonia Niedermaier (GER)	Canyon//SRAM	+ 1' 06"
7	Niamh Fisher-Black (NZL)	Team SD Worx–Protime	+ 1' 07"
8	Mavi García (ESP)	Liv AlUla Jayco	+ 1' 33"
9	Katrine Aalerud (NOR)	Uno-X Mobility	+ 1' 34"
10	Pauliena Rooijakkers (NED)	Fenix–Deceuninck	+ 1' 34"

== Stage 6 ==
12 July 2024 — San Benedetto del Tronto to Chieti, 159 km (99 mi)

Stage 6 Result
Rank	Rider	Team	Time
1	Liane Lippert (GER)	Movistar Team	4h 16' 21"
2	Ruth Edwards (USA)	Human Powered Health	+ 0"
3	Erica Magnaldi (ITA)	UAE Team ADQ	+ 1"
4	Elisa Longo Borghini (ITA)	Lidl–Trek	+ 21"
5	Neve Bradbury (AUS)	Canyon//SRAM	+ 21"
6	Juliette Labous (FRA)	Team dsm–firmenich PostNL	+ 21"
7	Lotte Kopecky (BEL)	Team SD Worx–Protime	+ 21"
8	Antonia Niedermaier (GER)	Canyon//SRAM	+ 21"
9	Cecilie Uttrup Ludwig (DEN)	FDJ–Suez	+ 21"
10	Mavi García (ESP)	Liv AlUla Jayco	+ 21"

General classification after Stage 6
Rank	Rider	Team	Time
1	Elisa Longo Borghini (ITA)	Lidl–Trek	16h 24' 29"
2	Lotte Kopecky (BEL)	Team SD Worx–Protime	+ 3"
3	Cecilie Uttrup Ludwig (DEN)	FDJ–Suez	+ 38"
4	Juliette Labous (FRA)	Team dsm–firmenich PostNL	+ 49"
5	Antonia Niedermaier (GER)	Canyon//SRAM	+ 1' 06"
6	Kimberley Le Court (MRI)	AG Insurance–Soudal	+ 1' 28"
7	Niamh Fisher-Black (NZL)	Team SD Worx–Protime	+ 1' 29"
8	Mavi García (ESP)	Liv AlUla Jayco	+ 1' 33"
9	Pauliena Rooijakkers (NED)	Fenix–Deceuninck	+ 1' 34"
10	Gaia Realini (ITA)	Lidl–Trek	+ 1' 44"

== Stage 7 ==
13 July 2024 — Lanciano to Blockhaus, 120 km (75 mi)

Stage 7 Result
Rank	Rider	Team	Time
1	Neve Bradbury (AUS)	Canyon//SRAM	4h 17' 34"
2	Lotte Kopecky (BEL)	Team SD Worx–Protime	+ 44"
3	Elisa Longo Borghini (ITA)	Lidl–Trek	+ 44"
4	Pauliena Rooijakkers (NED)	Fenix–Deceuninck	+ 1' 07"
5	Antonia Niedermaier (GER)	Canyon//SRAM	+ 2' 02"
6	Juliette Labous (FRA)	Team dsm–firmenich PostNL	+ 2' 02"
7	Niamh Fisher-Black (NZL)	Team SD Worx–Protime	+ 2' 05"
8	Gaia Realini (ITA)	Lidl–Trek	+ 2' 15"
9	Mareille Meijering (NED)	Movistar Team	+ 4' 20"
10	Mavi García (ESP)	Liv AlUla Jayco	+ 4' 20"

General classification after Stage 7
Rank	Rider	Team	Time
1	Elisa Longo Borghini (ITA)	Lidl–Trek	20h 42' 43"
2	Lotte Kopecky (BEL)	Team SD Worx–Protime	+ 1"
3	Neve Bradbury (AUS)	Canyon//SRAM	+ 1' 12"
4	Pauliena Rooijakkers (NED)	Fenix–Deceuninck	+ 2' 01"
5	Juliette Labous (FRA)	Team dsm–firmenich PostNL	+ 2' 11"
6	Antonia Niedermaier (GER)	Canyon//SRAM	+ 2' 28"
7	Niamh Fisher-Black (NZL)	Team SD Worx–Protime	+ 2' 54"
8	Gaia Realini (ITA)	Lidl–Trek	+ 3' 19"
9	Cecilie Uttrup Ludwig (DEN)	FDJ–Suez	+ 4' 18"
10	Mavi García (ESP)	Liv AlUla Jayco	+ 5' 13"

== Stage 8 ==
14 July 2024 — Pescara to L'Aquila, 117 km (73 mi)

Stage 8 Result
Rank	Rider	Team	Time
1	Kimberley Le Court (MRI)	AG Insurance–Soudal	3h 19' 08"
2	Ruth Edwards (USA)	Human Powered Health	+ 0"
3	Franziska Koch (GER)	Team dsm–firmenich PostNL	+ 0"
4	Elisa Longo Borghini (ITA)	Lidl–Trek	+ 25"
5	Juliette Labous (FRA)	Team dsm–firmenich PostNL	+ 29"
6	Pauliena Rooijakkers (NED)	Fenix–Deceuninck	+ 29"
7	Neve Bradbury (AUS)	Canyon//SRAM	+ 29"
8	Mavi García (ESP)	Liv AlUla Jayco	+ 29"
9	Mareille Meijering (NED)	Movistar Team	+ 32"
10	Justine Ghekiere (BEL)	AG Insurance–Soudal	+ 32"

General classification after Stage 8
Rank	Rider	Team	Time
1	Elisa Longo Borghini (ITA)	Lidl–Trek	24h 02' 16"
2	Lotte Kopecky (BEL)	Team SD Worx–Protime	+ 21"
3	Neve Bradbury (AUS)	Canyon//SRAM	+ 1' 16"
4	Pauliena Rooijakkers (NED)	Fenix–Deceuninck	+ 2' 05"
5	Juliette Labous (FRA)	Team dsm–firmenich PostNL	+ 2' 15"
6	Antonia Niedermaier (GER)	Canyon//SRAM	+ 2' 41"
7	Gaia Realini (ITA)	Lidl–Trek	+ 3' 41"
8	Cecilie Uttrup Ludwig (DEN)	FDJ–Suez	+ 4' 31"
9	Mavi García (ESP)	Liv AlUla Jayco	+ 5' 17"
10	Niamh Fisher-Black (NZL)	Team SD Worx–Protime	+ 5' 55"
