= 2024 Tour de Suisse Women =

2024 UCI Women's World Tour, race 20 of 27

Race details
- Dates: 15–18 June 2024
- Stages: 4
- Distance: 327.4 km (203.4 mi)
- Winning time: 9h 03' 17"

Results
| Jersey awarded to the overall winner | Winner | Demi Vollering (NED) | (Team SD Worx–Protime) |
| | Second | Neve Bradbury (AUS) | (Canyon//SRAM) |
| | Third | Elisa Longo Borghini (ITA) | (Lidl–Trek) |
| Jersey awarded to the points classification winner | Points | Demi Vollering (NED) | (Team SD Worx–Protime) |
| Jersey awarded to the mountains classification winner | Mountains | Elise Chabbey (SUI) | (Canyon//SRAM) |
| Jersey awarded to the youth classification winner | Youth | Neve Bradbury (AUS) | (Canyon//SRAM) |
| | Team | (Germany) Canyon//SRAM | |

The 2024 Tour de Suisse Women was a women's road cycling stage race that was held in Switzerland from 15 to 18 June. It was the eighth edition of the Tour de Suisse and was the 20th event of the 2024 UCI Women's World Tour calendar. The race was held following the men's Tour de Suisse.

The race was won by Dutch rider Demi Vollering (Team SD Worx–Protime), who finished nearly a minute and a half ahead of Australian rider Neve Bradbury (Canyon//SRAM). On her way to victory, Vollering won three of the four stages, as well as the points classification. Third overall was Italian Elisa Longo Borghini (Lidl–Trek). The mountains classification was won by Swiss rider Elise Chabbey (Canyon//SRAM), and Bradbury took the youth classification. The team classification was won by Canyon//SRAM, with three riders finishing in the top 10 overall.

== Teams ==
Ten UCI Women's WorldTeams, 7 UCI Women's Continental Teams, and the Swiss national team made up the eighteen teams that participated in the race.

UCI Women's WorldTeams

- Canyon//SRAM
- FDJ–Suez
- Fenix–Deceuninck
- Lidl–Trek
- Liv AlUla Jayco
- Roland
- Team dsm–firmenich PostNL
- Team SD Worx–Protime
- UAE Team ADQ
- Visma–Lease a Bike

UCI Women's Continental Teams

- ARA Skip Capital
- Bepink–Bongioanni
- EF Education–Cannondale
- St. Michel–Mavic–Auber93
- Tashkent City Women Professional Cycling Team
- Team Bridgelane WE
- VolkerWessels Women Cyclingteam

National Teams

- Switzerland

== Route and stages ==
Stage characteristics
| Stage | Date | Course | Distance | Type | Stage winner |
|---|---|---|---|---|---|
| 1 | 15 June | Villars-sur-Ollon to Villars-sur-Ollon | 58.6 km (36.4 mi) | Mountain stage | Demi Vollering (NED) |
| 2 | 16 June | Aigle to Villars-sur-Ollon | 15.7 km (9.8 mi) | Mountain time trial | Demi Vollering (NED) |
| 3 | 17 June | Vevey to Champagne | 125.6 km (78.0 mi) | Hilly stage | Neve Bradbury (AUS) |
| 4 | 18 June | Champagne to Champagne | 127.5 km (79.2 mi) | Hilly stage | Demi Vollering (NED) |
| Total | | | 327.4 km (203.4 mi) | | |

== Stages ==
=== Stage 1 ===
15 June 2024 — Villars-sur-Ollon to Villars-sur-Ollon, 58.6 km (36.4 mi)

Stage 1 Result
| Rank | Rider | Team | Time |
|---|---|---|---|
| 1 | Demi Vollering (NED) | Team SD Worx–Protime | 1h 47' 10" |
| 2 | Gaia Realini (ITA) | Lidl–Trek | + 22" |
| 3 | Elise Chabbey (SUI) | Canyon//SRAM | + 46" |
| 4 | Elisa Longo Borghini (ITA) | Lidl–Trek | + 58" |
| 5 | Kim Cadzow (NZL) | EF Education–Cannondale | + 1' 03" |
| 6 | Juliette Labous (FRA) | Team dsm–firmenich PostNL | + 1' 17" |
| 7 | Marion Bunel (FRA) | St. Michel–Mavic–Auber93 | + 1' 17" |
| 8 | Neve Bradbury (AUS) | Canyon//SRAM | + 1' 17" |
| 9 | Urška Žigart (SLO) | Liv AlUla Jayco | + 1' 17" |
| 10 | Amanda Spratt (AUS) | Lidl–Trek | + 1' 29" |

General classification after Stage 1
| Rank | Rider | Team | Time |
|---|---|---|---|
| 1 | Demi Vollering (NED) | Team SD Worx–Protime | 1h 47' 00" |
| 2 | Gaia Realini (ITA) | Lidl–Trek | + 26" |
| 3 | Elise Chabbey (SUI) | Canyon//SRAM | + 49" |
| 4 | Elisa Longo Borghini (ITA) | Lidl–Trek | + 1' 08" |
| 5 | Kim Cadzow (NZL) | EF Education–Cannondale | + 1' 13" |
| 6 | Juliette Labous (FRA) | Team dsm–firmenich PostNL | + 1' 27" |
| 7 | Marion Bunel (FRA) | St. Michel–Mavic–Auber93 | + 1' 27" |
| 8 | Neve Bradbury (AUS) | Canyon//SRAM | + 1' 27" |
| 9 | Urška Žigart (SLO) | Liv AlUla Jayco | + 1' 27" |
| 10 | Amanda Spratt (AUS) | Lidl–Trek | + 1' 39" |

=== Stage 2 ===
16 June 2024 — Aigle to Villars-sur-Ollon, 15.7 km (9.8 mi) (ITT)

Stage 2 Result
| Rank | Rider | Team | Time |
|---|---|---|---|
| 1 | Demi Vollering (NED) | Team SD Worx–Protime | 39' 47" |
| 2 | Elisa Longo Borghini (ITA) | Lidl–Trek | + 18" |
| 3 | Kim Cadzow (NZL) | EF Education–Cannondale | + 26" |
| 4 | Juliette Labous (FRA) | Team dsm–firmenich PostNL | + 47" |
| 5 | Antonia Niedermaier (GER) | Canyon//SRAM | + 1' 01" |
| 6 | Gaia Realini (ITA) | Lidl–Trek | + 1' 02" |
| 7 | Brodie Chapman (AUS) | Lidl–Trek | + 1' 24" |
| 8 | Amanda Spratt (AUS) | Lidl–Trek | + 1' 49" |
| 9 | Neve Bradbury (AUS) | Canyon//SRAM | + 2' 18" |
| 10 | Femke de Vries (NED) | Visma–Lease a Bike | + 2' 36" |

General classification after Stage 2
| Rank | Rider | Team | Time |
|---|---|---|---|
| 1 | Demi Vollering (NED) | Team SD Worx–Protime | 2h 26' 47" |
| 2 | Elisa Longo Borghini (ITA) | Lidl–Trek | + 1' 26" |
| 3 | Gaia Realini (ITA) | Lidl–Trek | + 1' 28" |
| 4 | Kim Cadzow (NZL) | EF Education–Cannondale | + 1' 39" |
| 5 | Juliette Labous (FRA) | Team dsm–firmenich PostNL | + 2' 14" |
| 6 | Antonia Niedermaier (GER) | Canyon//SRAM | + 2' 40" |
| 7 | Amanda Spratt (AUS) | Lidl–Trek | + 3' 28" |
| 8 | Brodie Chapman (AUS) | Lidl–Trek | + 3' 41" |
| 9 | Neve Bradbury (AUS) | Canyon//SRAM | + 3' 45" |
| 10 | Elise Chabbey (SUI) | Canyon//SRAM | + 4' 13" |

=== Stage 3 ===
17 June 2024 — Vevey to Champagne, 125.6 km (78.0 mi)

Stage 3 Result
| Rank | Rider | Team | Time |
|---|---|---|---|
| 1 | Neve Bradbury (AUS) | Canyon//SRAM | 3h 16' 36" |
| 2 | Katarzyna Niewiadoma (POL) | Canyon//SRAM | + 0" |
| 3 | Femke de Vries (NED) | Visma–Lease a Bike | + 1' 55" |
| 4 | Amanda Spratt (AUS) | Lidl–Trek | + 1' 55" |
| 5 | Elisa Longo Borghini (ITA) | Lidl–Trek | + 2' 11" |
| 6 | Demi Vollering (NED) | Team SD Worx–Protime | + 2' 11" |
| 7 | Gaia Realini (ITA) | Lidl–Trek | + 2' 11" |
| 8 | Kim Cadzow (NZL) | EF Education–Cannondale | + 2' 11" |
| 9 | Elena Pirrone (ITA) | Roland | + 2' 49" |
| 10 | Brodie Chapman (AUS) | Lidl–Trek | + 2' 53" |

General classification after Stage 3
| Rank | Rider | Team | Time |
|---|---|---|---|
| 1 | Demi Vollering (NED) | Team SD Worx–Protime | 5h 45' 34" |
| 2 | Neve Bradbury (AUS) | Canyon//SRAM | + 1' 22" |
| 3 | Elisa Longo Borghini (ITA) | Lidl–Trek | + 1' 26" |
| 4 | Gaia Realini (ITA) | Lidl–Trek | + 1' 28" |
| 5 | Kim Cadzow (NZL) | EF Education–Cannondale | + 1' 39" |
| 6 | Katarzyna Niewiadoma (POL) | Canyon//SRAM | + 2' 14" |
| 7 | Juliette Labous (FRA) | Team dsm–firmenich PostNL | + 2' 56" |
| 8 | Amanda Spratt (AUS) | Lidl–Trek | + 3' 11" |
| 9 | Antonia Niedermaier (GER) | Canyon//SRAM | + 3' 22" |
| 10 | Femke de Vries (NED) | Visma–Lease a Bike | + 4' 11" |

=== Stage 4 ===
18 June 2024 — Champagne to Champagne, 127.5 km (79.2 mi)

Stage 4 Result
| Rank | Rider | Team | Time |
|---|---|---|---|
| 1 | Demi Vollering (NED) | Team SD Worx–Protime | 3h 17' 53" |
| 2 | Elisa Longo Borghini (ITA) | Lidl–Trek | + 0" |
| 3 | Neve Bradbury (AUS) | Canyon//SRAM | + 0" |
| 4 | Katarzyna Niewiadoma (POL) | Canyon//SRAM | + 0" |
| 5 | Steffi Häberlin (SUI) | Switzerland | + 42" |
| 6 | Évita Muzic (FRA) | FDJ–Suez | + 42" |
| 7 | Juliette Labous (FRA) | Team dsm–firmenich PostNL | + 42" |
| 8 | Niamh Fisher-Black (NZL) | Team SD Worx–Protime | + 42" |
| 9 | Rosita Reijnhout (NED) | Visma–Lease a Bike | + 42" |
| 10 | Urška Žigart (SLO) | Liv AlUla Jayco | + 42" |

General classification after Stage 4
| Rank | Rider | Team | Time |
|---|---|---|---|
| 1 | Demi Vollering (NED) | Team SD Worx–Protime | 9h 03' 17" |
| 2 | Neve Bradbury (AUS) | Canyon//SRAM | + 1' 28" |
| 3 | Elisa Longo Borghini (ITA) | Lidl–Trek | + 1' 30" |
| 4 | Katarzyna Niewiadoma (POL) | Canyon//SRAM | + 2' 24" |
| 5 | Juliette Labous (FRA) | Team dsm–firmenich PostNL | + 3' 47" |
| 6 | Antonia Niedermaier (GER) | Canyon//SRAM | + 4' 11" |
| 7 | Gaia Realini (ITA) | Lidl–Trek | + 5' 33" |
| 8 | Kim Cadzow (NZL) | EF Education–Cannondale | + 5' 44" |
| 9 | Urška Žigart (SLO) | Liv AlUla Jayco | + 6' 00" |
| 10 | Évita Muzic (FRA) | FDJ–Suez | + 6' 49" |

== Classification leadership table ==
Classification leadership by stage
| Stage | Winner | General classification | Points classification | Mountains classification | Young rider classification | Team classification |
|---|---|---|---|---|---|---|
| 1 | Demi Vollering | Demi Vollering | Demi Vollering | Elise Chabbey | Gaia Realini | Lidl–Trek |
| 2 | Demi Vollering | Demi Vollering | Demi Vollering | Elise Chabbey | Gaia Realini | Lidl–Trek |
| 3 | Neve Bradbury | Demi Vollering | Demi Vollering | Elise Chabbey | Neve Bradbury | Lidl–Trek |
| 4 | Demi Vollering | Demi Vollering | Demi Vollering | Elise Chabbey | Neve Bradbury | Canyon//SRAM |
| Final | | Demi Vollering | Demi Vollering | Elise Chabbey | Neve Bradbury | Canyon//SRAM |

== Classification standings ==
Legend
| Denotes the winner of the general classification | Denotes the winner of the mountains classification |
| Denotes the winner of the points classification | Denotes the winner of the young rider classification |

=== General classification ===
Final general classification (1–10)
| Rank | Rider | Team | Time |
|---|---|---|---|
| 1 | Demi Vollering (NED) | Team SD Worx–Protime | 9h 03' 17" |
| 2 | Neve Bradbury (AUS) | Canyon//SRAM | + 1' 28" |
| 3 | Elisa Longo Borghini (ITA) | Lidl–Trek | + 1' 30" |
| 4 | Katarzyna Niewiadoma (POL) | Canyon//SRAM | + 2' 24" |
| 5 | Juliette Labous (FRA) | Team dsm–firmenich PostNL | + 3' 47" |
| 6 | Antonia Niedermaier (GER) | Canyon//SRAM | + 4' 11" |
| 7 | Gaia Realini (ITA) | Lidl–Trek | + 5' 33" |
| 8 | Kim Cadzow (NZL) | EF Education–Cannondale | + 5' 44" |
| 9 | Urška Žigart (SLO) | Liv AlUla Jayco | + 6' 00" |
| 10 | Évita Muzic (FRA) | FDJ–Suez | + 6' 49" |

=== Points classification ===
Final points classification (1–10)
| Rank | Rider | Team | Points |
|---|---|---|---|
| 1 | Demi Vollering (NED) | Team SD Worx–Protime | 36 |
| 2 | Elisa Longo Borghini (ITA) | Lidl–Trek | 22 |
| 3 | Neve Bradbury (AUS) | Canyon//SRAM | 20 |
| 4 | Katarzyna Niewiadoma (POL) | Canyon//SRAM | 12 |
| 5 | Femke de Vries (NED) | Visma–Lease a Bike | 10 |
| 6 | Elise Chabbey (SUI) | Canyon//SRAM | 10 |
| 7 | Gaia Realini (ITA) | Lidl–Trek | 8 |
| 8 | Kim Cadzow (NZL) | EF Education–Cannondale | 8 |
| 9 | Antonia Niedermaier (GER) | Canyon//SRAM | 6 |
| 10 | Juliette Labous (FRA) | Team dsm–firmenich PostNL | 5 |

=== Mountains classification ===
Final mountains classification (1–10)
| Rank | Rider | Team | Points |
|---|---|---|---|
| 1 | Elise Chabbey (SUI) | Canyon//SRAM | 24 |
| 2 | Gaia Realini (ITA) | Lidl–Trek | 18 |
| 3 | Antonia Niedermaier (GER) | Canyon//SRAM | 9 |
| 4 | Demi Vollering (NED) | Team SD Worx–Protime | 9 |
| 5 | Neve Bradbury (AUS) | Canyon//SRAM | 7 |
| 6 | Katarzyna Niewiadoma (POL) | Canyon//SRAM | 6 |
| 7 | Femke de Vries (NED) | Visma–Lease a Bike | 4 |
| 8 | Elisa Longo Borghini (ITA) | Lidl–Trek | 4 |
| 9 | Kim Cadzow (NZL) | EF Education–Cannondale | 3 |
| 10 | Amanda Spratt (AUS) | Lidl–Trek | 3 |

=== Young rider classification ===
Final young rider classification (1–10)
| Rank | Rider | Team | Time |
|---|---|---|---|
| 1 | Neve Bradbury (AUS) | Canyon//SRAM | 9h 04' 45" |
| 2 | Antonia Niedermaier (GER) | Canyon//SRAM | + 2' 43" |
| 3 | Gaia Realini (ITA) | Lidl–Trek | + 4' 05" |
| 4 | Kim Cadzow (NZL) | EF Education–Cannondale | + 4' 16" |
| 5 | Évita Muzic (FRA) | FDJ–Suez | + 5' 21" |
| 6 | Nienke Vinke (NED) | Team dsm–firmenich PostNL | + 8' 31" |
| 7 | Monica Trinca Colonel (ITA) | Bepink–Bongioanni | + 8' 33" |
| 8 | Rosita Reijnhout (NED) | Visma–Lease a Bike | + 10' 22" |
| 9 | Marion Bunel (FRA) | St. Michel–Mavic–Auber93 | + 10' 47" |
| 10 | Inge van der Heiden (NED) | Fenix–Deceuninck | + 11' 12" |

=== Team classification ===
Final team classification (1–10)
| Rank | Team | Time |
|---|---|---|
| 1 | (Germany) Canyon//SRAM | 27h 17' 24" |
| 2 | (United States) Lidl–Trek | + 5' 00" |
| 3 | (Australia) Liv AlUla Jayco | + 23' 44" |
| 4 | (Netherlands) Visma–Lease a Bike | + 25' 17" |
| 5 | (Netherlands) Team dsm–firmenich PostNL | + 29' 47" |
| 6 | (United States) EF Education–Cannondale | + 34' 39" |
| 7 | (France) FDJ–Suez | + 38' 46" |
| 8 | (Netherlands) Team SD Worx–Protime | + 39' 31" |
| 9 | (Belgium) Fenix–Deceuninck | + 40' 00" |
| 10 | (United Arab Emirates) UAE Team ADQ | + 45' 25" |

== See also ==
- 2024 in women's road cycling
