= 2024 Giro d'Italia Women =

Italian cycling race

2024 UCI Women's World Tour, race 21 of 27

Race details
- Dates: 7–14 July 2024
- Stages: 8
- Distance: 876.7 km (544.8 mi)

Results
Jersey awarded to the overall winner	Winner	Elisa Longo Borghini (ITA)	(Lidl–Trek)
	Second	Lotte Kopecky (BEL)	(Team SD Worx–Protime)
	Third	Neve Bradbury (AUS)	(Canyon//SRAM)
Jersey awarded to the points classification winner	Points	Lotte Kopecky (BEL)	(Team SD Worx–Protime)
Jersey awarded to the mountains classification winner	Mountains	Justine Ghekiere (BEL)	(AG Insurance–Soudal)
Jersey awarded to the young rider classification winner	Young rider	Neve Bradbury (AUS)	(Canyon//SRAM)
	Team	(Australia) Liv AlUla Jayco	

The 2024 Giro d'Italia Women was the 35th edition of the Giro d'Italia Women, a women's road cycling stage race in Italy. The race took place from 7 to 14 July and was the 21st event of the 2024 UCI Women's World Tour calendar. The race was organised by RCS Sport, which also organised the men's Giro d'Italia. The race was won by Italian rider Elisa Longo Borghini of Lidl–Trek, the first Italian winner since 2008.

== Teams ==
22 teams participated in the race. Each team started with seven riders. All 15 UCI Women's WorldTeams were automatically invited. They were joined by five UCI Women's Continental Teams selected by organisers RCS Sport. The two best UCI Women's Continental Teams of the 2023 season also gained automatic invitations. The teams were announced on 7 June 2024.

UCI Women's WorldTeams

- AG Insurance–Soudal
- Canyon//SRAM
- Ceratizit–WNT Pro Cycling
- FDJ–Suez
- Fenix–Deceuninck
- Human Powered Health
- Roland
- Lidl–Trek
- Liv AlUla Jayco
- Movistar Team
- Team dsm–firmenich PostNL
- Team SD Worx–Protime
- UAE Team ADQ
- Uno-X Mobility
- Visma–Lease a Bike

UCI Women's Continental Teams

- Bepink–Bongioanni
- Cofidis
- EF Education–Cannondale
- Isolmant–Premac–Vittoria
- Laboral Kutxa–Fundación Euskadi
- Tashkent City Women Professional Cycling Team
- Top Girls Fassa Bortolo

== Route ==
In December 2023, the route was announced by new organisers RCS Sport. The race started in Brescia, Lombardy in northern Italy with an individual time trial, before heading south through the Emilia-Romagna, Marche, Umbria and Abruzzo regions. The final two stages were in the southern Apennines mountains, with the queen stage on stage 7 with a summit finish at Blockhaus at an elevation of 1,680 metres (5,510 ft). As the highest climb of the race, the first rider to pass Blockhaus was awarded the "Cima Alfonsina Strada" – a prize named after Italian cyclist Alfonsina Strada, who took part in the men's Giro d’Italia in 1924. The total race distance of 856 km (532 mi) was the shortest since 2013, with the previous 10 editions of the race averaging over 950 kilometres (590 mi) in length.

Following criticism of previous editions of the race, the 2024 route was considered to be "impressive" and a "positive step", with praise for the last two mountain stages. As with the previous editions, the route required a waiver from the Union Cycliste Internationale, as Women's WorldTour races have a maximum race length of six days.

Stage characteristics
Stage	Date	Course	Distance	Type	Winner
1	7 July	Brescia	15.7 km (9.8 mi)	Individual time trial	Elisa Longo Borghini (ITA)
2	8 July	Sirmione to Volta Mantovana	110 km (68 mi)	Flat stage	Chiara Consonni (ITA)
3	9 July	Sabbioneta to Toano	113 km (70 mi)	Hilly stage	Niamh Fisher-Black (NZL)
4	10 July	Imola to Urbino	134 km (83 mi)	Hilly stage	Clara Emond (CAN)
5	11 July	Frontone to Foligno	108 km (67 mi)	Hilly stage	Lotte Kopecky (BEL)
6	12 July	San Benedetto del Tronto to Chieti	159 km (99 mi)	Hilly stage	Liane Lippert (GER)
7	13 July	Lanciano to Blockhaus	120 km (75 mi)	Mountain stage	Neve Bradbury (AUS)
8	14 July	Pescara to L'Aquila	117 km (73 mi)	Mountain stage	Kimberley Le Court (MRI)
Total			876.7 km (544.8 mi)		

== Classification leadership table ==
Classification leadership by stage
Stage	Winner	General classification	Points classification	Mountains classification	Young rider classification	Team classification
1	Elisa Longo Borghini	Elisa Longo Borghini	Elisa Longo Borghini (Note: On stage two, Grace Brown, who was second in the points classification, wore the red jersey, because first placed Elisa Longo Borghini wore the pink jersey as the leader of the general classification.)	not awarded	Antonia Niedermaier	Lidl–Trek
2	Chiara Consonni	Elisa Longo Borghini	Chiara Consonni	Ana Vitória Magalhães	Antonia Niedermaier	Lidl–Trek
3	Niamh Fisher-Black	Elisa Longo Borghini	Lotte Kopecky	Niamh Fisher-Black	Antonia Niedermaier	Lidl–Trek
4	Clara Emond	Elisa Longo Borghini	Lotte Kopecky	Clara Emond	Antonia Niedermaier	Canyon//SRAM
5	Lotte Kopecky	Elisa Longo Borghini	Lotte Kopecky	Clara Emond	Antonia Niedermaier	Canyon//SRAM
6	Liane Lippert	Elisa Longo Borghini	Lotte Kopecky	Clara Emond	Antonia Niedermaier	Liv AlUla Jayco
7	Neve Bradbury	Elisa Longo Borghini	Lotte Kopecky	Justine Ghekiere	Neve Bradbury	Liv AlUla Jayco
8	Kimberley Le Court	Elisa Longo Borghini	Lotte Kopecky	Justine Ghekiere	Neve Bradbury	Liv AlUla Jayco
Final		Elisa Longo Borghini	Lotte Kopecky	Justine Ghekiere	Neve Bradbury	Liv AlUla Jayco

== Classification standings ==
Legend
Denotes the leader of the general classification	Denotes the leader of the mountains classification
Denotes the leader of the points classification	Denotes the leader of the young rider classification

=== General classification ===
Final general classification (1–10)
Rank	Rider	Team	Time
1	Elisa Longo Borghini (ITA)	Lidl–Trek	24h 02' 16"
2	Lotte Kopecky (BEL)	Team SD Worx–Protime	+ 21"
3	Neve Bradbury (AUS)	Canyon//SRAM	+ 1' 16"
4	Pauliena Rooijakkers (NED)	Fenix–Deceuninck	+ 2' 05"
5	Juliette Labous (FRA)	Team dsm–firmenich PostNL	+ 2' 15"
6	Antonia Niedermaier (GER)	Canyon//SRAM	+ 2' 41"
7	Gaia Realini (ITA)	Lidl–Trek	+ 3' 41"
8	Cecilie Uttrup Ludwig (DEN)	FDJ–Suez	+ 4' 31"
9	Mavi García (ESP)	Liv AlUla Jayco	+ 5' 17"
10	Niamh Fisher-Black (NZL)	Team SD Worx–Protime	+ 5' 55"

=== Points classification ===
Final points classification (1–10)
Rank	Rider	Team	Points
1	Lotte Kopecky (BEL)	Team SD Worx–Protime	154
2	Elisa Longo Borghini (ITA)	Lidl–Trek	68
3	Niamh Fisher-Black (NZL)	Team SD Worx–Protime	59
4	Arlenis Sierra (CUB)	Movistar Team	55
5	Silvia Zanardi (ITA)	Human Powered Health	51
6	Kimberley Le Court (MRI)	AG Insurance–Soudal	47
7	Soraya Paladin (ITA)	Canyon//SRAM	40
8	Juliette Labous (FRA)	Team dsm–firmenich PostNL	39
9	Neve Bradbury (AUS)	Canyon//SRAM	35
10	Cecilie Uttrup Ludwig (DEN)	FDJ–Suez	35

=== Mountains classification ===
Final mountains classification (1–10)
Rank	Rider	Team	Time
1	Justine Ghekiere (BEL)	AG Insurance–Soudal	68
2	Lotte Kopecky (BEL)	Team SD Worx–Protime	35
3	Neve Bradbury (AUS)	Canyon//SRAM	30
4	Elisa Longo Borghini (ITA)	Lidl–Trek	25
5	Pauliena Rooijakkers (NED)	Fenix–Deceuninck	22
6	Antonia Niedermaier (GER)	Canyon//SRAM	22
7	Niamh Fisher-Black (NZL)	Team SD Worx–Protime	20
8	Lucinda Brand (NED)	Lidl–Trek	16
9	Ana Vitória Magalhães (BRA)	Bepink–Bongioanni	13
10	Gaia Realini (ITA)	Lidl–Trek	11

=== Young rider classification ===
Final young rider classification (1–10)
Rank	Rider	Team	Time
1	Neve Bradbury (AUS)	Canyon//SRAM	24h 03' 32"
2	Antonia Niedermaier (GER)	Canyon//SRAM	+ 1' 25"
3	Solbjørk Minke Anderson (DEN)	Uno-X Mobility	+ 18' 02"
4	Elisa Valtulini (ITA)	Bepink–Bongioanni	+ 44' 27"
5	Eleonora Camilla Gasparrini (ITA)	UAE Team ADQ	+ 58' 46"
6	Gaia Segato (ITA)	Top Girls Fassa Bortolo	+ 1h 03' 52"
7	Ella Wyllie (NZL)	Liv AlUla Jayco	+ 1h 06' 07"
8	Nienke Vinke (NED)	Team dsm–firmenich PostNL	+ 1h 11' 20"
9	Lore De Schepper (BEL)	AG Insurance–Soudal	+ 1h 19' 13"
10	Francesca Barale (ITA)	Team dsm–firmenich PostNL	+ 1h 21' 13"

=== Team classification ===
Final team classification (1–10)
Rank	Team	Time
1	(Australia) Liv AlUla Jayco	72h 31' 43"
2	(United States) Lidl–Trek	+ 9' 23"
3	(Germany) Canyon//SRAM	+ 38' 19"
4	(Netherlands) Team SD Worx–Protime	+ 40' 37"
5	(Spain) Laboral Kutxa–Fundación Euskadi	+ 51' 14"
6	(France) FDJ–Suez	+ 1h 09' 04"
7	(United Arab Emirates) UAE Team ADQ	+ 1h 09' 31"
8	(Spain) Movistar Team	+ 1h 13' 04"
9	(Norway) Uno-X Mobility	+ 1h 15' 41"
10	(Belgium) AG Insurance–Soudal	+ 1h 33' 02"
