= Maud Oudeman =

Dutch cyclist (born 2003)

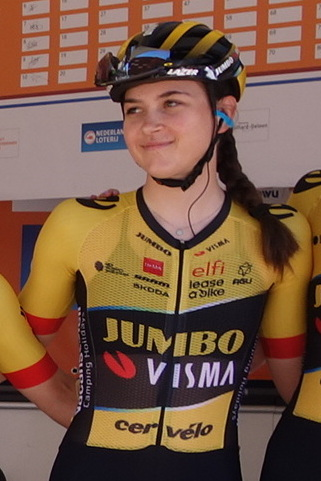
- Roldan in 2023

Personal information
- Full name: Maud Oudeman
- Born: 29 September 2003 (age 23) Nijmegen, Netherlands

Cycling career
- Sport: Cycling
- Current team: Visma–Lease a Bike
- Discipline: Road
- Role: Rider

Professional teams
- 2022: Canyon//SRAM
- 2023–: Team Jumbo–Visma

Maud Oudeman (born 29 September 2003) is a Dutch professional cyclist, who currently rides for UCI Women's WorldTeam Visma–Lease a Bike.

== Early life ==
Oudeman was raised in Nijmegen in the eastern Netherlands. Her father, Menno Oudeman was a professional triathlete, and Maud pursued triathlon for before switching to cycling.

== Career ==
In 2021, Oudeman won the Zwift Academy, an international competition using the Zwift platform to identify cycling talent. Oudeman beat out over 150,000 other competitors over an eight-week competition, and after being declared the winner she was granted a one-year contract with Canyon//SRAM. Already on the team was previous Zwift Academy winner Neve Bradbury.

== Major results ==
2021
4th Junior time trial, National Championships
2024
9th Overall Volta Ciclista a Catalunya Femenina
10th Overall Vuelta a Burgos Feminas
2025
6th Road race, European Under-23 Road Championships
10th GP Oetingen
2026
10th Overall Vuelta a Burgos Feminas
