= Frontone =

- Comune
- Comune di Frontone
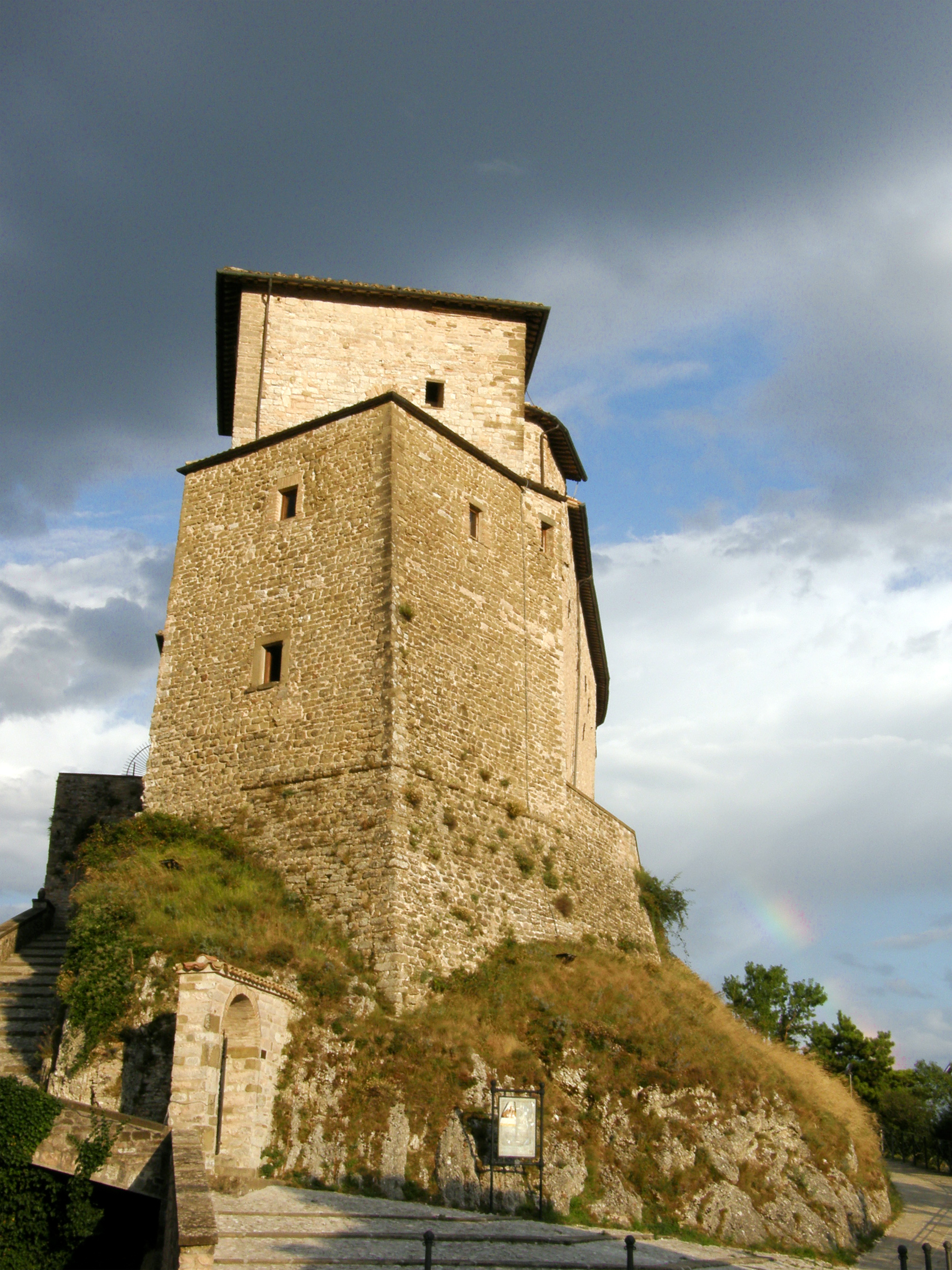
- Rocca (Castle) of Frontone

- Coat of arms

- Location within Italy Location within Marche
- Coordinates: 43°31′N 12°44′E
- Country: Italy
- Region: Marche
- Province: Pesaro e Urbino (PU)
- Frazioni: Castello, Colombara, Foce

Area
  - Total: 36.0 km^{2} (13.9 sq mi)
- Elevation: 412 m (1,352 ft)

Population (28 February 2009)
  - Total: 1,355
  - Density: 37.6/km^{2} (97.5/sq mi)
- Demonym: Frontonesi
- Time zone: UTC+1 (CET)
  - Summer (DST): UTC+2 (CEST)
- Postal code: 61040
- Dialing code: 0721
- Patron saint: St. Theodore
- Saint day: 9 September

Frontone is a comune (municipality) in the Province of Pesaro e Urbino in the Italian region of Marche, located about 60 kilometres (37 mi) west of Ancona and about 45 kilometres (28 mi) southwest of Pesaro.

Frontone borders the following municipalities: Cagli, Cantiano, Pergola, Scheggia e Pascelupo, Serra Sant'Abbondio.

The town is home to a Rocca (castle), designed, among the others, by Francesco di Giorgio Martini.

== Climate ==
Climate data for Frontone (1991-2020), elevation:570m
Month	Jan	Feb	Mar	Apr	May	Jun	Jul	Aug	Sep	Oct	Nov	Dec	Year
Mean daily maximum °C (°F)	6.9 (44.4)	8.0 (46.4)	12.0 (53.6)	16.2 (61.2)	21.3 (70.3)	26.3 (79.3)	29.4 (84.9)	29.1 (84.4)	22.8 (73.0)	17.1 (62.8)	11.6 (52.9)	7.8 (46.0)	17.4 (63.3)
Daily mean °C (°F)	4.6 (40.3)	5.2 (41.4)	8.4 (47.1)	11.9 (53.4)	16.6 (61.9)	21.2 (70.2)	24.0 (75.2)	23.8 (74.8)	18.4 (65.1)	13.9 (57.0)	9.2 (48.6)	5.5 (41.9)	13.6 (56.4)
Mean daily minimum °C (°F)	2.4 (36.3)	2.6 (36.7)	5.2 (41.4)	8.1 (46.6)	12.3 (54.1)	16.6 (61.9)	19.1 (66.4)	19.1 (66.4)	14.6 (58.3)	11.0 (51.8)	6.9 (44.4)	3.4 (38.1)	10.1 (50.2)
Average precipitation mm (inches)	65.1 (2.56)	77.9 (3.07)	82.2 (3.24)	93.3 (3.67)	86.1 (3.39)	70.3 (2.77)	51.2 (2.02)	57.4 (2.26)	103.4 (4.07)	107.8 (4.24)	137.7 (5.42)	103.9 (4.09)	1,036.3 (40.8)
Average precipitation days (≥ 1.0 mm)	8.10	8.77	8.63	9.77	9.20	6.77	4.97	5.40	8.83	9.77	11.47	9.90	101.58
Average relative humidity (%)	75.62	71.86	67.57	66.05	64.49	58.67	53.79	55.94	68.13	76.23	79.78	77.03	67.93
Average dew point °C (°F)	0.4 (32.7)	-0.0 (32.0)	2.1 (35.8)	4.9 (40.8)	9.1 (48.4)	11.7 (53.1)	12.6 (54.7)	13.1 (55.6)	11.8 (53.2)	9.7 (49.5)	5.9 (42.6)	1.7 (35.1)	6.9 (44.5)
Source: NOAA
