= Kim Cadzow =

New Zealand cyclist (born 2001)

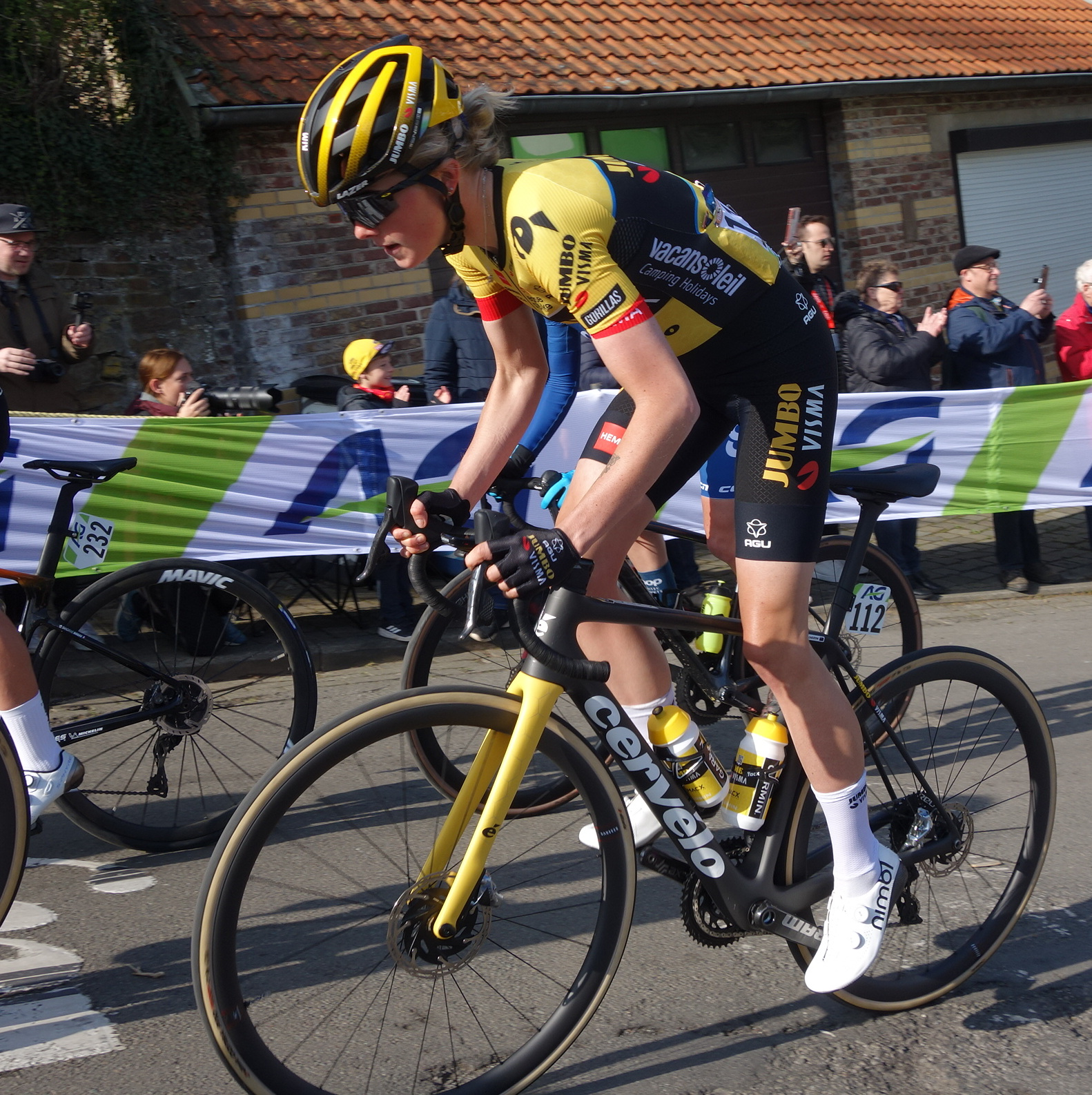
- Cadzow in 2023

Personal information
- Born: 18 December 2001 (age 24) Tauranga, New Zealand

Cycling career
- Sport: Cycling
- Discipline: Road
- Role: Rider

Professional teams
- 2022: Torelli–Cayman Islands–Scimitar
- 2023: Team Jumbo–Visma
- 2024–2026: EF Education–Oatly

Major wins
- One-day races and Classics National Time trial Championships (2024, 2025) National Road Race Championships (2025)

Kim Cadzow (born 18 December 2001) is a retired New Zealand professional racing cyclist, who most recently rode for the UCI Women's WorldTeam EF Education–Oatly. She is the 2025 New Zealand Time Trial and Road Race Champion.

Cadzow's sporting background was as a swimmer and professional triathlete competing mainly in 70.3 triathlon races. Kim swam for Greerton Swim Club in Tauranga, New Zealand specialising in backstroke and Individual Medley races. She was a regular competitor at National Age Group Championshipss and New Zealand Open Championships.

Her brief period in 70.3 triathlon saw her progress to pro level quickly but she decided to concentrate on cycling after her first attempt at 2021 New Zealand Age Group Nationals produced 3rd place in both the time trial and road race.

In 2022 Cadzow entered the Elite National Championships in New Zealand and won the Under-23 Time Trial. Shortly afterwards she achieved 2nd in the Oceania Under 23 Time Trial and headed to Europe for her first season with Torelli-Cayman Islands-Scimitar. A standout performance in the Mount Ventoux Denivele Challenge attracted attention from several World Tour Teams, and a move to Team Jumbo-Visma was secured for 2023.

A 2023 highlight was a 3rd place at the 2nd stage of Tour of Scandinavia where Cadzow showed her climbing ability on the Norefjell. At the end of 2023, Cadzow ended her contract with Jumbo-Visma and secured a move to EF Education-Cannondale.

2024 was a breakout year for Cadzow, with EF-Education-Cannondale winning the NZ Time Trial event and 2nd in the road race. A GC win at Trofeo Ponente in Rosa, 6th at Liege-Bastogne-Liege, 8th on GC at Tour de Suisse, 10th on GC at La Vuelta Feminina and 7th place in the Time Trial at the Paris Summer Olympics.

2025 began with wins at NZ Elite nationals in both the time trial and road races.

Cadzow announced her immediate retirement from professional cycling on 29 July 2026.

== Major results ==
2022
1st Time trial, National Under-23 Road Championships
2nd Time trial, Oceania Under-23 Road Championships
5th Mont Ventoux Dénivelé Challenge
2024
National Road Championships

1st Time trial
2nd Road race
5th Criterium

1st Overall Trofeo Ponente in Rosa

1st Stage 1

5th Trofeo Oro in Euro
6th Liège–Bastogne–Liège Femmes
7th Time trial, Olympic Games
8th Overall Tour de Suisse
10th Overall La Vuelta Femenina
2025
National Road Championships

1st Time trial
1st Road Race
