= Justine Ghekiere =

Belgian cyclist (born 1996)

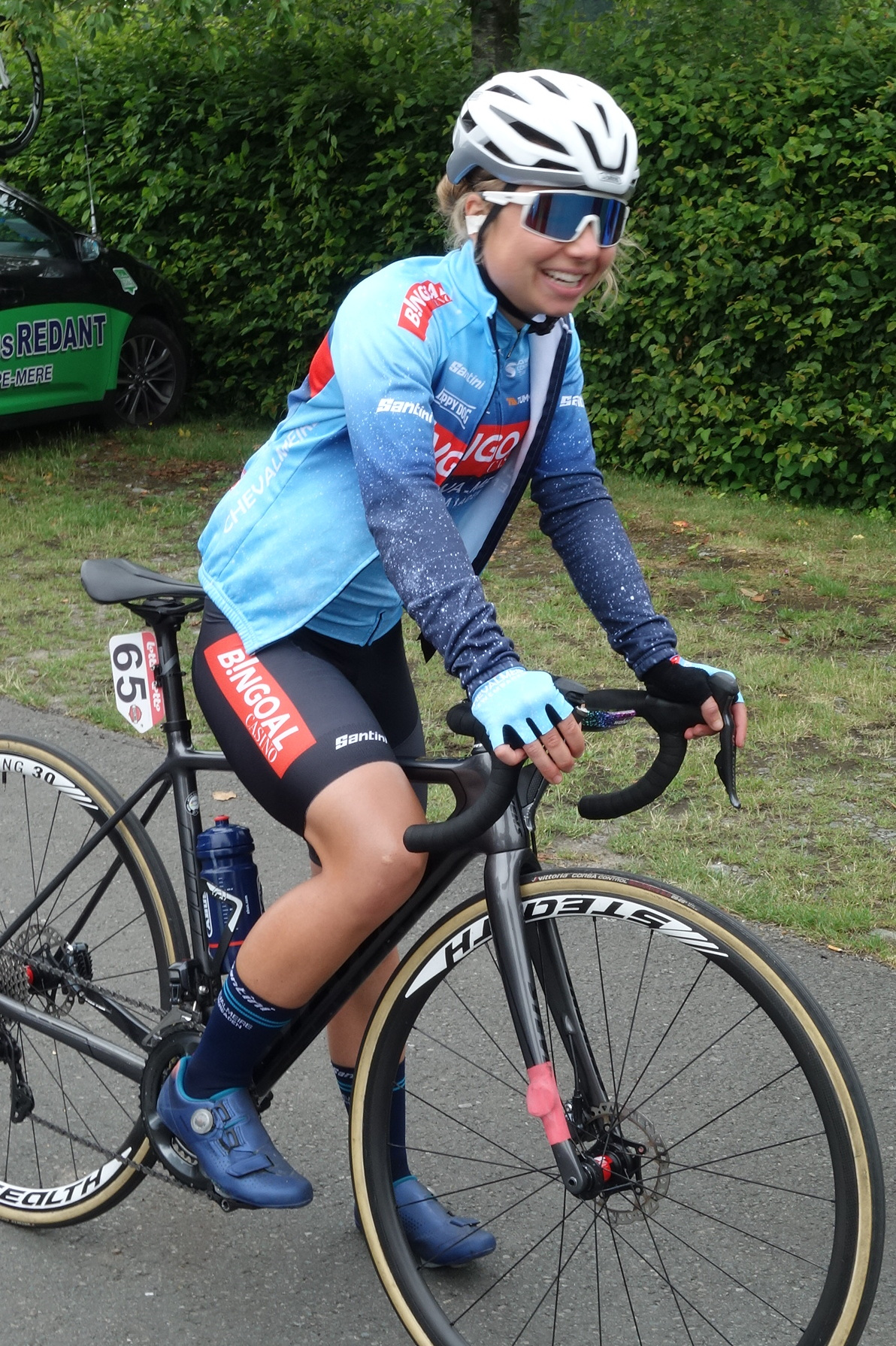
- Ghekiere in 2021

Personal information
- Born: 14 May 1996 (age 30) Izegem, Belgium
- Height: 1.63 m (5 ft 4 in)
- Weight: 52 kg (115 lb)

Cycling career
- Sport: Cycling
- Current team: AG Insurance–Soudal
- Discipline: Road
- Role: Rider

Professional teams
- 2021: Bingoal Casino–Chevalmeire
- 2022: Plantur–Pura
- 2023–: AG Insurance–Soudal–Quick-Step

Major wins
- Major Tours Tour de France Mountains classification (2024) 1 individual stage (2024) Giro d'Italia Mountains classification (2024) Stage races Setmana Ciclista Valenciana (2023) One-day races and Classics National Road Race Championships (2025)

Justine Ghekiere (born 14 May 1996) is a Belgian cyclist, who currently rides for UCI Women's WorldTeam AG Insurance–Soudal. She was on the Belgium team that supported Lotte Kopecky to her two wins in the 2023 and 2024 UCI Road World Championships in Glasgow, Scotland resp. Zurich, Switzerland and she was on the Belgium team that supported Lotte Kopecky to her bronze medal at the 2024 Summer Olympics in Paris, France.

In 2024, Ghekiere won the mountains classification at both the Tour de France Femmes and the Giro d'Italia Women.

In 2025 she won her biggest victory to date finishing first in the Belgian National Road Race Championships.

== Personal life ==
Ghekiere worked as a fitness instructor and personal trainer when the COVID-19 pandemic struck in 2020. With fitness studios closed in Belgium, she took part in and won a Zwift challenge to ride the most distance in one week where the prize was a fitness test with a coach in her native Belgium. Her test results were so impressive that the coach sent them to a number of prospective cycling teams and she was offered a first contract with the Bingoal Casino–Chevalmeire team.

== Major results ==
2022
2nd Grand Prix de Wallonie
9th À travers les Hauts-de-France
10th Overall Thüringen Ladies Tour

1st Mountains classification

2023
1st Overall Setmana Ciclista Valenciana

1st Mountains classification

5th Durango-Durango Emakumeen Saria
8th Trofeo Alfredo Binda
2024
Tour de France

1st Mountains classification
1st Stage 7
Combativity award Stage 4

1st Mountains classification, Giro d'Italia
5th Grand Prix de Wallonie
7th Road race, UCI World Championships
2025
1st Road race, National Road Championships
6th Overall Tour Down Under
2026
9th Overall UAE Tour
