= Clara Emond =

Canadian cyclist

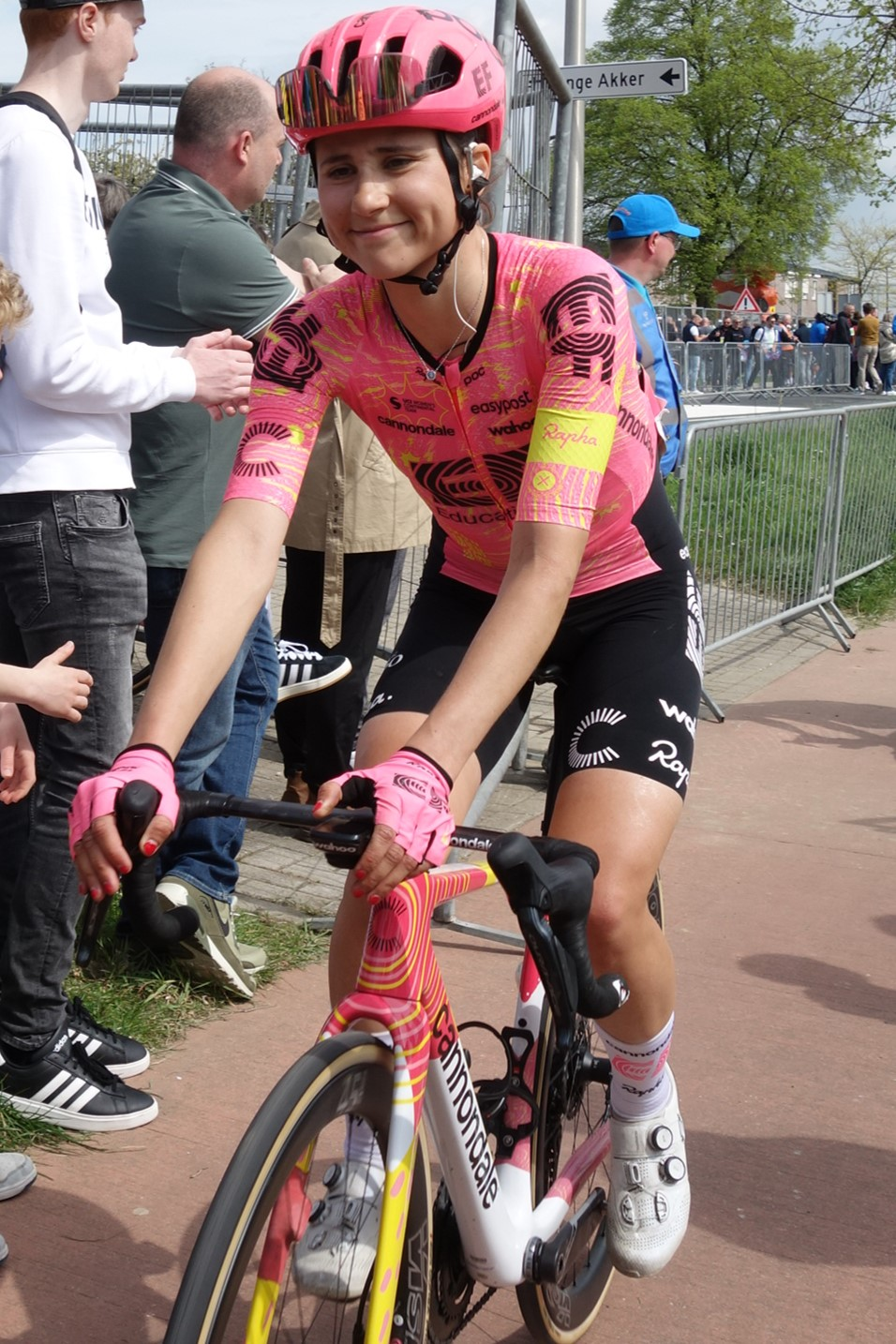

Personal information
- Full name: Clara Emond
- Born: 5 February 1997 (age 29) Saint-Ferréol-les-Neiges, Quebec Canada

Cycling career
- Sport: Cycling
- Current team: EF Education–Oatly
- Discipline: Road
- Role: Rider
- Rider type: Climbing specialist

Professional teams
- 2022: Emotional.fr–Tornatech–GSC Blagnac
- 2023: Arkéa Pro Cycling Team
- 2024–: EF Education–Cannondale

Clara Emond (born 5 February 1997) is a lawyer and Canadian professional racing cyclist, who rides for UCI Women's Continental Team EF Education–Oatly.

== Career ==
Emond trained as a lawyer and passed the bar, but began a professional cycling career in 2022 after being invited to join the Canadian team Emotional.fr–Tornatech–GSC Blagnac VS31. Emond joined the French UCI Women's Continental Team Arkéa Pro Cycling Team for the 2023 season, and placed second in the general classification at the 2023 Vuelta Extremadura Féminas while also securing the mountains classification. In 2024, Emond joined the American team EF Education–Cannondale, and won Stage 4 of the Giro d'Italia Women in a 90 km breakaway, her highest profile victory to date.

== Major results ==
2022
8th La Périgord Ladies
2023
2nd Overall Vuelta Extremadura Féminas

1st Mountains classification
1st Stage 1 (TTT)

3rd La Périgord Ladies
2024
1st Stage 4 Giro d'Italia
3rd Overall Trofeo Ponente in Rosa
2025
4th Maryland Cycling Classic Women
