= EF Education–Oatly =

American cycling team

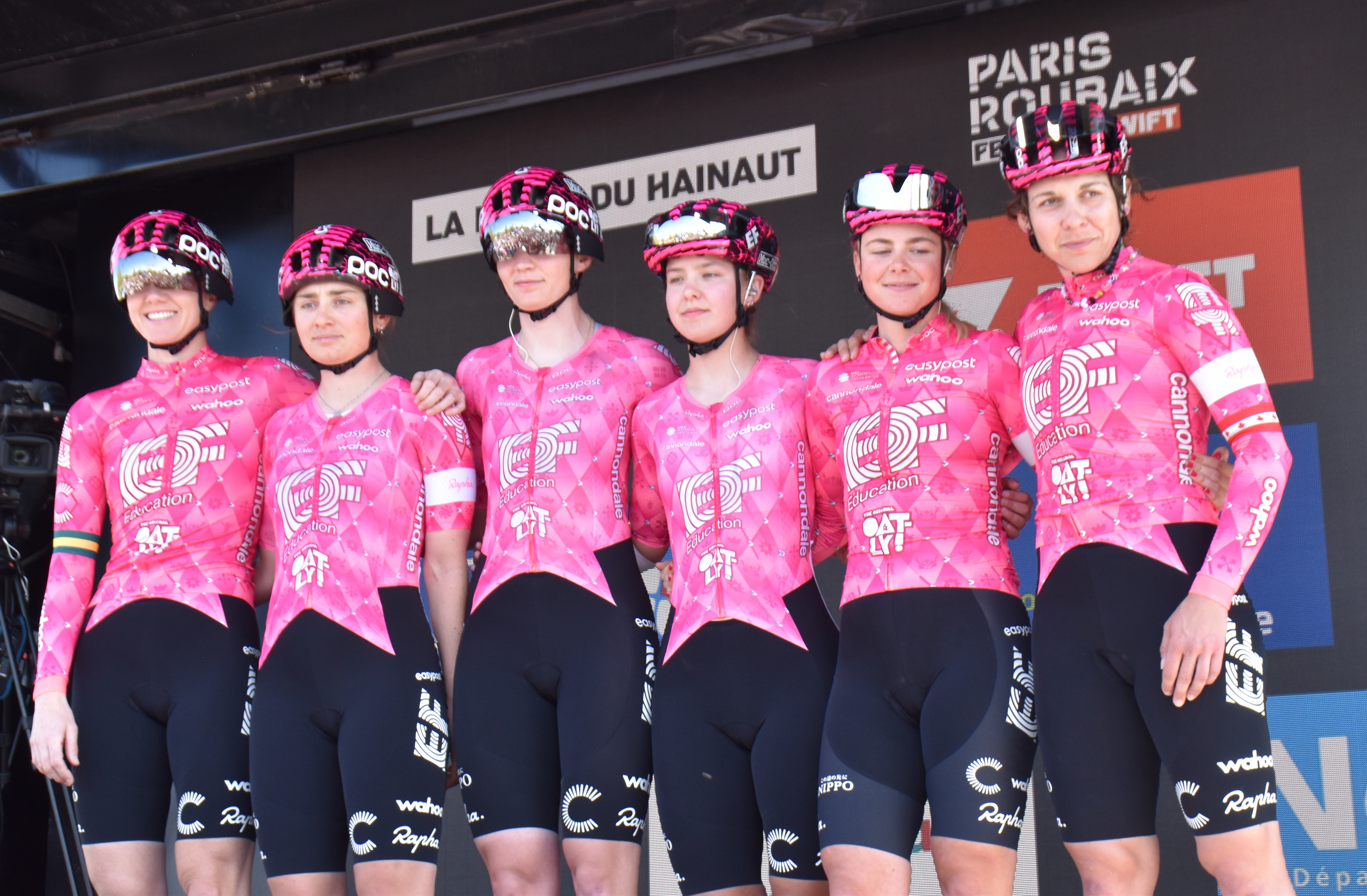
- At Paris-Roubaix in 2025

Team information
- UCI code: EFO
- Registered: United States
- Founded: 2023
- Discipline: Road
- Status: UCI Women's Continental Team (2024); UCI Women's ProTeam (2025–)

Key personnel
- General manager: Esra Tromp

Team name history
- 2024 2024 2025–: EF Education–Cannondale; EF–Oatly–Cannondale; EF Education–Oatly

EF Education–Oatly is a women's professional cycling team founded ahead of the 2024 season. The team is based in the United States and competes in elite road bicycle racing. The team's title sponsors are Swedish-Swiss education company EF Education First and Swedish oat milk company Oatly.

== Team history ==
In June 2023 EF Education announced a new women's team, EF Education–Cannondale. This was announced after both SVB and Tibco stopped their sponsorship of the EF Education–Tibco–SVB team. In August, Veronica Ewers, one of the EF Education–Tibco–SVB riders, was announced as signing for the new team. In June 2024, the team announced that the Swedish food company Oatly would become a sponsor and changed its name to EF–Oatly–Cannondale.

From 2025, the team has become a UCI Women's ProTeam.

== Team roster ==
As of January 19, 2025.

Rider	Date of birth
Nina Berton (LUX)	August 3, 2001 (age 25)
Letizia Borghesi (ITA)	October 16, 1998 (age 27)
Kim Cadzow (NZL)	December 18, 2001 (age 24)
Henrietta Christie (NZL)	January 23, 2002 (age 24)
Clara Emond (CAN)	February 5, 1997 (age 29)
Veronica Ewers (USA)	September 1, 1994 (age 32)
Kristen Faulkner (USA)	December 18, 1992 (age 33)
Lotta Henttala (FIN)	June 28, 1989 (age 37)

Rider	Date of birth
Alison Jackson (CAN)	December 14, 1988 (age 37)
Cédrine Kerbaol (FRA)	May 15, 2001 (age 25)
Nina Kessler (NED)	July 4, 1988 (age 38)
Mirre Knaven (NED)	August 18, 2004 (age 22)
Sarah Roy (AUS)	February 27, 1986 (age 40)
Noemi Rüegg (SUI)	April 19, 2001 (age 25)
Magdeleine Vallieres (CAN)	August 10, 2001 (age 25)
Babette van der Wolf (NED)	April 29, 2004 (age 22)
Alexandra Volstad (CAN)	January 3, 2006 (age 20)

== Major wins ==
2024
Trofeo Felanitx–Colònia de Sant Jordi (Ses Salines), Noemi Rüegg
Trofeo Palma, Magdeleine Vallieres
New Zealand New Zealand Time Trial Championships, Kim Cadzow
Omloop van het Hageland, Kristen Faulkner
Overall Trofeo Ponente in Rosa, Kim Cadzow

Stage 1, Kim Cadzow
Stages 2 & 3, Kristen Faulkner

Stage 2 La Vuelta Feminina, Alison Jackson
Stage 4 La Vuelta Feminina, Kristen Faulkner
Stage 1 Vuelta a Burgos Feminas, Lotta Henttala
United States United States Road Race Championships, Kristen Faulkner
Switzerland Switzerland Road Race Championships, Noemi Rüegg
Stage 4 Giro d'Italia Women, Clara Emond
Olympic Road Race, Kristen Faulkner
2025
Overall Women's Tour Down Under, Noemi Rüegg

Stage 2, Noemi Rüegg

Trofeo Marratxi-Felanitx, Lotta Henttala
New Zealand New Zealand Time Trial Championships, Kim Cadzow
New Zealand New Zealand Road Race Championships, Kim Cadzow
Overall Gracia, Alison Jackson

Stage 2, Alison Jackson

United States United States Road Race Championships, Kristen Faulkner
2026
Overall Women's Tour Down Under, Noemi Rüegg

Stage 3, Noemi Rüegg

== National, continental and world champions ==
2024
New Zealand Time Trial, Kim Cadzow
USA Road Race, Kristen Faulkner
Swiss Road Race, Noemi Rüegg
Olympic Road Race, Kristen Faulkner
2025
New Zealand Time Trial, Kim Cadzow
New Zealand Road Race, Kim Cadzow
USA Road Race, Kristen Faulkner
2025 UCI Road World Championships Road Race, Magdaleine Vallieres Mill
