= Neve Bradbury =

Australian cyclist (born 2002)

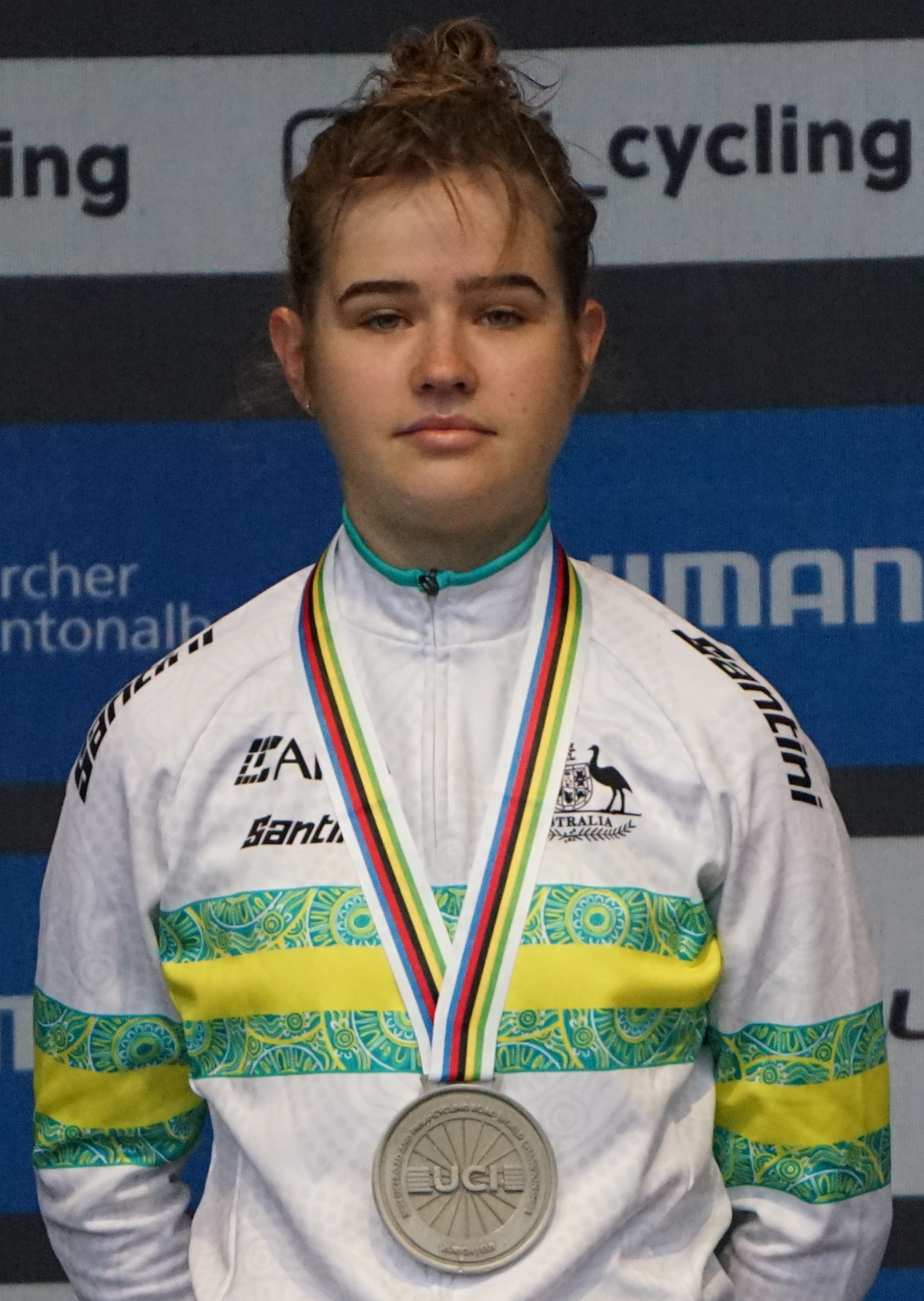
- Bradbury at the 2024 UCI Road World Championships

Personal information
- Born: 11 April 2002 (age 24) Melbourne, Australia
- Weight: 50 kg (110 lb)

Cycling career
- Sport: Cycling
- Current team: Canyon//SRAM
- Discipline: Road
- Role: Rider

Professional team
- 2021–: Canyon//SRAM

Major wins
- Major Tours Giro d'Italia Young rider classification (2024) 1 individual stage (2024)
Medal record
Women's road bicycle racing
Representing Australia
World Championships
Silver medal – second place	2024 Zurich	Under-23 road race

Neve Bradbury (born 11 April 2002) is an Australian professional racing cyclist, who currently rides for UCI Women's WorldTeam Canyon//SRAM.

== History ==
In 2020, Bradbury won the Zwift Academy, an indoor cycling talent identification programme – subsequently signing a contract with UCI Women's WorldTeam Canyon//SRAM for the 2021 season.

In 2024, Bradbury won her first UCI Women's World Tour stage at the 2024 Tour de Suisse Women. She then finished 3rd at the 2024 Giro d'Italia Women, winning stage 7 on the Blockhaus climb, as well as the winning the young rider classification. Bradbury then extended her contract with Canyon//SRAM to the 2027 season.

== Education ==
In 2022, Bradbury was studying for a Bachelor of Exercise and Sport Science at Deakin University.

== Major results ==
2019
Oceania Junior Road Championships

3rd Road race
7th Time trial

2021
2nd Road race, National Under-23 Road Championships
2022
5th Overall Tour of Scandinavia
10th Overall Giro Donne
2023
5th Overall Tour Féminin International des Pyrénées
7th Overall Thüringen Ladies Tour

1st Young rider classification

2024
National Under-23 Road Championships

1st Road race
3rd Time trial

2nd Overall Tour de Suisse

1st Young rider classification
1st Stage 3

2nd Overall UAE Tour

1st Young rider classification

3rd Overall Giro d'Italia

1st Young rider classification
1st Stage 7

3rd Overall Tour Down Under
UCI World Championships

2nd Under-23 road race

2025
8th Overall Women's Tour Down Under
2026
National Road Championships

3rd Road race
4th Criterium
