= Fenix–Premier Tech =

Belgian cycling team

Team information
- UCI code: CIM (2020–2021); PLP (2021–2022); FED (2023–2024); FDC (2025–present)
- Registered: Belgium
- Founded: 2020
- Discipline: Road
- Status: UCI Women's Continental Team (2020–2022); UCI Women's WorldTeam (2023–)
- Bicycles: Canyon
- Components: Shimano

Key personnel
- General manager: Philip Roodhooft
- Team manager: Christoph Roodhooft

Team name history
- 2020–2021; 2021–2022; 2023–2025; 2026–: Ciclismo Mundial (CIM); Plantur–Pura (PLP); Fenix–Deceuninck; Fenix–Premier Tech
Fenix–Premier Tech jersey
Jersey

Fenix–Premier Tech is a women's professional road bicycle racing team based in Belgium, that was formed in 2020. It became a UCI Women's WorldTeam in 2023. It is the sister team of UCI WorldTeam Alpecin–Premier Tech.

== History ==
In May 2020, Alpecin–Fenix announced the launch of a Women's road team, aimed at providing racing opportunities for their cyclocross stars all year round.

The following March, following sponsorship from German haircare company Dr. Wolff and its Plantur caffeine shampoo brand, and Dutch architectural materials provider Pura NFC by Trespa, the team became known as Plantur–Pura. From 2023, Italian interior design materials company Fenix began sponsoring the team. From 2026, the team has been sponsored by Canadian horticultural company PremierTech, joining Fenix.

== Team roster ==
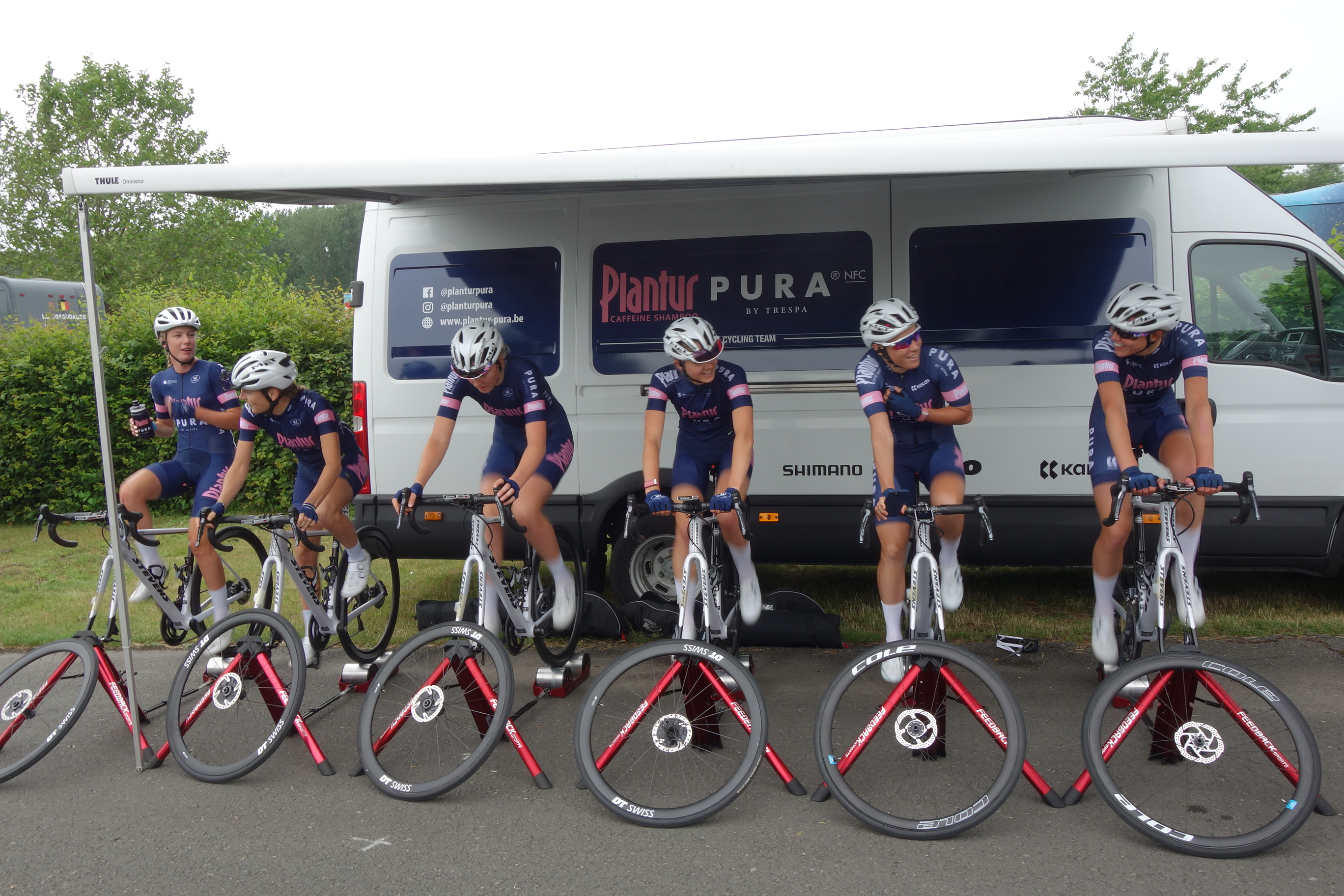
The team in 2021 at the Lotto Belgium Tour.

As of 17 January 2025.

Rider	Date of birth
Ceylin del Carmen Alvarado (NED)	6 August 1998 (age 28)
Sara Casasola (ITA)	29 November 1999 (age 26)
Millie Couzens (GBR)	29 October 2003 (age 22)
Julie de Wilde (BEL)	8 December 2002 (age 23)
Yara Kastelijn (NED)	9 August 1997 (age 29)
Evy Kuijpers (NED)	15 February 1995 (age 31)
Flora Perkins (GBR)	16 September 2003 (age 22)
Puck Pieterse (NED)	13 May 2002 (age 24)
Pauliena Rooijakkers (NED)	12 May 1993 (age 33)

Rider	Date of birth
Carina Schrempf (AUT)	16 October 1994 (age 31)
Christina Schweinberger (AUT)	29 October 1996 (age 29)
Marthe Truyen (BEL)	30 September 1999 (age 26)
Aniek van Alphen (NED)	1 February 1999 (age 27)
Inge van der Heijden (NED)	12 August 1999 (age 27)
Xaydée Van Sinaey (BEL)	16 May 2005 (age 21)
Cecilia van Zuthem (NED)	27 November 2003 (age 22)
Annemarie Worst (NED)	19 December 1995 (age 30)

== Major results ==
2021
Baal Cyclo-cross, Ceylin Alvarado
Hamme-Zogge Cyclo-cross, Ceylin Alvarado
Overijse Cyclo-cross, Ceylin Alvarado
Lille Cyclo-cross, Ceylin Alvarado
Brussels, Cyclo-cross, Ceylin Alvarado
UCI Ranking Cyclo-cross, Ceylin Alvarado
Vlaams-Brabant Provincial Time Trial Championships, Kiona Crabbé
Nederhasselt, Julie De Wilde
Beringen Cyclo-cross, Yara Kastelijn
Meulebeke Cyclo-cross, Sanne Cant
Iowa City Cyclo-cross, Manon Bakker
2023
Stage 4 Tour de France Femmes, Yara Kastelijn

== World, Continental & National champions ==
2021
Belgium Cyclo-cross,Sanne Cant
European Track (Team pursuit), Laura Süßemilch
World Track (Team pursuit), Laura Süßemilch

2022
Austria Time Trial, Christina Schweinberger
Belgium Road, Kim De Baat
