= 2025 Tour of Guangxi (women's race) =

2025 UCI Women's World Tour, race 27 of 27

Race details
- Dates: 19 October 2025
- Stages: 1
- Distance: 108.5 km (67.4 mi)
- Winning time: 2h 49' 34"

Results
	Winner	Anna Henderson (GBR)	(Lidl–Trek)
	Second	Caroline Andersson (SWE)	(Liv AlUla Jayco)
	Third	Usoa Ostolaza (ESP)	(Laboral Kutxa–Fundación Euskadi)

The 2025 Tour of Guangxi was the 6th edition of the Tour of Guangxi road cycling one day race and the final event of the 2025 UCI Women's World Tour. It was held on 19 October.

== Teams ==
Five UCI Women's WorldTeams and twelve UCI Women's Continental Teams made up the seventeen teams that participated in the race.

UCI Women's WorldTeams

- UAE Team ADQ
- Lidl–Trek
- Liv AlUla Jayco
- Human Powered Health
- Roland Le Dévoluy

UCI Women's Continental Teams

- Laboral Kutxa–Fundación Euskadi
- VolkerWessels Women Cyclingteam
- Team Coop–Repsol
- BePink–Imatra–Bongioanni
- Thailand Women's Cycling Team
- Lotto Ladies
- Eneicat–CMTeam
- Aromitalia 3T Vaiano
- Born to Win BTC City Ljubljana Zhiraf
- China Liv Pro Cycling
- Li Ning Star Ladies
- Team Dukla Praha

== Results ==
Result
Rank	Rider	Team	Time
1	Anna Henderson (GBR)	Lidl–Trek	2h 49' 34"
2	Caroline Andersson (SWE)	Liv AlUla Jayco	+ 0"
3	Usoa Ostolaza (ESP)	Laboral Kutxa–Fundación Euskadi	+ 59"
4	Marina Komina	Li Ning Star Ladies	+ 59"
5	Elynor Bäckstedt (GBR)	UAE Team ADQ	+ 59"
6	Riejanne Markus (NED)	Lidl–Trek	+ 59"
7	Iurani Blanco (ESP)	Human Powered Health	+ 59"
8	Karin Söderqvist (SWE)	Team Coop–Repsol	+ 59"
9	Marina Garau (ESP)	BePink–Imatra–Bongioanni	+ 2' 19"
10	Giulia Giuliani (ITA)	Roland Le Dévoluy	+ 2' 19"
