= 2025 Itzulia Women =

Cycling race

2025 UCI Women's World Tour, race 16 of 27

Race details
- Dates: 16–18 May 2025
- Stages: 3
- Distance: 377.4 km (234.5 mi)
- Winning time: 9h 55' 44"

Results
Jersey awarded to the overall winner	Winner	Demi Vollering (NED)	(FDJ–Suez)
	Second	Mischa Bredewold (NED)	(Team SD Worx–Protime)
	Third	Sarah van Dam (CAN)	(Ceratizit Pro Cycling)
Jersey awarded to the points classification winner	Points	Mischa Bredewold (NED)	(Team SD Worx–Protime)
Jersey awarded to the mountains classification winner	Mountains	Demi Vollering (NED)	(FDJ–Suez)
Jersey awarded to the youth classification winner	Youth	Antonia Niedermaier (GER)	(Canyon//SRAM zondacrypto)
	Team	(Germany) Canyon//SRAM zondacrypto	

The 2025 Itzulia Women was a Spanish women's road cycle stage race that was held in the Basque Country from 16 to 18 May. It was the fourth edition of Itzulia Women, and the 16th event in the 2025 UCI Women's World Tour.

The race was won by Dutch rider Demi Vollering of FDJ–Suez for the third time, with Vollering winning the final stage to secure her victory. Vollering also won the mountains classification for the third time. Mischa Bredewold of Team SD Worx–Protime finished second, after winning the first two stages – Bredewold also won the points classification. Sarah Van Dam of Ceratizit Pro Cycling finished third, after gaining bonus seconds on the last stage. Antonia Niedermaier of Canyon//SRAM zondacrypto won the youth classification, with her team also winning the team classification.

== Pre-race favorites ==
Dutch rider Demi Vollering was widely seen by cycling analysts as the top favorite, having finished first or second in every previous edition of Itzulia Women, with two wins in 2022 and 2024. Team SD Worx–Protime teammates Mischa Bredewold and Anna van der Breggen were also top contenders; Bredwold finished runner-up with two stage wins in the 2024 edition, while Van der Breggen was making her debut in the race but has had significant success in other stage races. Other riders mentioned in pre-race analysis were Évita Muzic, Yara Kastelijn, Mavi Garcia, and Thalita de Jong.

== Teams ==
Fourteen UCI Women's WorldTeams, two UCI Women's ProTeams, and three UCI Women's Continental Teams took part in the race.

UCI Women's WorldTeams

- AG Insurance–Soudal
- Canyon//SRAM zondacrypto
- Ceratizit Pro Cycling
- FDJ–Suez
- Fenix–Deceuninck
- Human Powered Health
- Lidl–Trek
- Liv AlUla Jayco
- Movistar Team
- Team Picnic–PostNL
- Roland
- Team SD Worx–Protime
- UAE Team ADQ
- Visma–Lease a Bike

UCI Women's ProTeams

- Laboral Kutxa–Fundación Euskadi
- Winspace Orange Seal

UCI Women's Continental Teams

- BePink–Imatra–Bongioanni
- Eneicat–CMTeam
- Team Coop–Repsol

== Route ==
The race used the hilly landscape of the Basque Country, with stage 3 featuring the famed Jaizkibel climb (7.9km at 5.6%) used in the Clásica de San Sebastián.

Stage characteristics and winners
Stage	Date	Course	Distance	Type	Stage winner
1	16 May	Zumarraga to Agurain	148.5 km (92.3 mi)	Hilly stage	Mischa Bredewold (NED)
2	17 May	Ugao-Miraballes to Igorre	116 km (72 mi)	Hilly stage	Mischa Bredewold (NED)
3	18 May	San Sebastián to San Sebastián	112.9 km (70.2 mi)	Hilly stage	Demi Vollering (NED)
Total			377.4 km (234.5 mi)		

== Stages ==
=== Stage 1 ===
16 May 2025 — Zumarraga to Agurain, 148.5 km (92.3 mi)

Stage 1 Result
Rank	Rider	Team	Time
1	Mischa Bredewold (NED)	Team SD Worx–Protime	3h 52' 02"
2	Millie Couzens (GBR)	Fenix–Deceuninck	+ 0"
3	Margaux Vigié (FRA)	Visma–Lease a Bike	+ 0"
4	Paula Blasi (ESP)	UAE Team ADQ	+ 0"
5	Sarah Van Dam (CAN)	Ceratizit Pro Cycling	+ 0"
6	Karlijn Swinkels (NED)	UAE Team ADQ	+ 0"
7	Steffi Häberlin (SUI)	Team SD Worx–Protime	+ 0"
8	Thalita de Jong (NED)	Human Powered Health	+ 0"
9	Caroline Andersson (SWE)	Liv AlUla Jayco	+ 0"
10	Eleonora Ciabocco (ITA)	Team Picnic–PostNL	+ 0"

General classification after Stage 1
Rank	Rider	Team	Time
1	Mischa Bredewold (NED)	Team SD Worx–Protime	3h 51' 51"
2	Millie Couzens (GBR)	Fenix–Deceuninck	+ 5"
3	Margaux Vigié (FRA)	Visma–Lease a Bike	+ 7"
4	Katia Ragusa (ITA)	Human Powered Health	+ 8"
5	Julie Van de Velde (BEL)	AG Insurance–Soudal	+ 8"
6	Eva van Agt (NED)	Visma–Lease a Bike	+ 9"
7	Gaia Segato (ITA)	BePink–Imatra–Bongioanni	+ 9"
8	Morgane Coston (FRA)	Roland	+ 10"
9	Paula Blasi (ESP)	UAE Team ADQ	+ 11"
10	Sarah Van Dam (CAN)	Ceratizit Pro Cycling	+ 11"

=== Stage 2 ===
17 May 2025 — Ugao-Miraballes to Igorre, 116 km (72 mi)

Stage 2 Result
Rank	Rider	Team	Time
1	Mischa Bredewold (NED)	Team SD Worx–Protime	3h 08' 19"
2	Liane Lippert (GER)	Movistar Team	+ 0"
3	Soraya Paladin (ITA)	Canyon//SRAM zondacrypto	+ 0"
4	Sarah Van Dam (CAN)	Ceratizit Pro Cycling	+ 0"
5	Margaux Vigié (FRA)	Visma–Lease a Bike	+ 0"
6	Usoa Ostolaza (ESP)	Laboral Kutxa–Fundación Euskadi	+ 0"
7	Shirin van Anrooij (NED)	Lidl–Trek	+ 0"
8	Karlijn Swinkels (NED)	UAE Team ADQ	+ 0"
9	Eleonora Ciabocco (ITA)	Team Picnic–PostNL	+ 0"
10	Quinty Ton (NED)	Liv AlUla Jayco	+ 0"

General classification after Stage 2
Rank	Rider	Team	Time
1	Mischa Bredewold (NED)	Team SD Worx–Protime	7h 00' 00"
2	Liane Lippert (GER)	Movistar Team	+ 12"
3	Julie Van de Velde (BEL)	AG Insurance–Soudal	+ 15"
4	Margaux Vigié (FRA)	Visma–Lease a Bike	+ 17"
5	Soraya Paladin (ITA)	Canyon//SRAM zondacrypto	+ 17"
6	Demi Vollering (NED)	FDJ–Suez	+ 19"
7	Eva van Agt (NED)	Visma–Lease a Bike	+ 19"
8	Dilyxine Miermont (FRA)	Ceratizit Pro Cycling	+ 19"
9	Gaia Segato (ITA)	BePink–Imatra–Bongioanni	+ 19"
10	Marta Jaskulska (POL)	Ceratizit Pro Cycling	+ 20"

=== Stage 3 ===
18 May 2025 — San Sebastián to San Sebastián, 112.9 km (70.2 mi)

Stage 3 Result
Rank	Rider	Team	Time
1	Demi Vollering (NED)	FDJ–Suez	2h 55' 35"
2	Sarah Van Dam (CAN)	Ceratizit Pro Cycling	+ 55"
3	Justine Ghekiere (BEL)	AG Insurance–Soudal	+ 55"
4	Évita Muzic (FRA)	FDJ–Suez	+ 58"
5	Thalita de Jong (NED)	Human Powered Health	+ 58"
6	Mischa Bredewold (NED)	Team SD Worx–Protime	+ 58"
7	Amanda Spratt (AUS)	Lidl–Trek	+ 58"
8	Antonia Niedermaier (GER)	Canyon//SRAM zondacrypto	+ 58"
9	Mavi García (ESP)	Liv AlUla Jayco	+ 58"
10	Dilyxine Miermont (FRA)	Ceratizit Pro Cycling	+ 1' 17"

General classification after Stage 3 (Final)
Rank	Rider	Team	Time
1	Demi Vollering (NED)	FDJ–Suez	9h 55' 44"
2	Mischa Bredewold (NED)	Team SD Worx–Protime	+ 48"
3	Sarah Van Dam (CAN)	Ceratizit Pro Cycling	+ 1' 01"
4	Justine Ghekiere (BEL)	AG Insurance–Soudal	+ 1' 03"
5	Thalita de Jong (NED)	Human Powered Health	+ 1' 10"
6	Amanda Spratt (AUS)	Lidl–Trek	+ 1' 10"
7	Mavi García (ESP)	Liv AlUla Jayco	+ 1' 10"
8	Antonia Niedermaier (GER)	Canyon//SRAM zondacrypto	+ 1' 10"
9	Évita Muzic (FRA)	FDJ–Suez	+ 1' 10"
10	Dilyxine Miermont (FRA)	Ceratizit Pro Cycling	+ 1' 27"

== Classification leadership table ==
Classification leadership by stage
Stage	Winner	General classification	Points classification	Mountains classification	Young rider classification	Team classification
1	Mischa Bredewold	Mischa Bredewold	Mischa Bredewold	Morgane Coston	Millie Couzens	Team SD Worx–Protime
2	Mischa Bredewold	Mischa Bredewold	Mischa Bredewold	Morgane Coston	Gaia Segato	Liv AlUla Jayco
3	Demi Vollering	Demi Vollering	Mischa Bredewold	Demi Vollering	Antonia Niedermaier	Ceratizit Pro Cycling
Final		Demi Vollering	Mischa Bredewold	Demi Vollering	Antonia Niedermaier	Ceratizit Pro Cycling

== Classification standings ==
Legend
Denotes the winner of the general classification	Denotes the winner of the mountains classification
Denotes the winner of the points classification	Denotes the winner of the young rider classification

=== General classification ===
Final general classification (1-10)
Rank	Rider	Team	Time
1	Demi Vollering (NED)	FDJ–Suez	9h 55' 44"
2	Mischa Bredewold (NED)	Team SD Worx–Protime	+ 48"
3	Sarah Van Dam (CAN)	Ceratizit Pro Cycling	+ 1' 01"
4	Justine Ghekiere (BEL)	AG Insurance–Soudal	+ 1' 03"
5	Thalita de Jong (NED)	Human Powered Health	+ 1' 10"
6	Amanda Spratt (AUS)	Lidl–Trek	+ 1' 10"
7	Mavi García (ESP)	Liv AlUla Jayco	+ 1' 10"
8	Antonia Niedermaier (GER)	Canyon//SRAM zondacrypto	+ 1' 10"
9	Évita Muzic (FRA)	FDJ–Suez	+ 1' 10"
10	Dilyxine Miermont (FRA)	Ceratizit Pro Cycling	+ 1' 27"

=== Points classification ===
Final points classification (1-10)
Rank	Rider	Team	Points
1	Mischa Bredewold (NED)	Team SD Worx–Protime	68
2	Sarah Van Dam (CAN)	Ceratizit Pro Cycling	46
3	Demi Vollering (NED)	FDJ–Suez	34
4	Margaux Vigié (FRA)	Visma–Lease a Bike	28
5	Thalita de Jong (NED)	Human Powered Health	24
6	Julie Van de Velde (BEL)	AG Insurance–Soudal	20
7	Sara Martín (ESP)	Movistar Team	20
8	Justine Ghekiere (BEL)	AG Insurance–Soudal	20
9	Soraya Paladin (ITA)	Canyon//SRAM zondacrypto	20
10	Millie Couzens (GBR)	Fenix–Deceuninck	20

=== Mountains classification ===
Final mountains classification (1-10)
Rank	Rider	Team	Points
1	Demi Vollering (NED)	FDJ–Suez	20
2	Amanda Spratt (AUS)	Lidl–Trek	11
3	Justine Ghekiere (BEL)	AG Insurance–Soudal	10
4	Morgane Coston (FRA)	Roland	9
5	Julie Van de Velde (BEL)	AG Insurance–Soudal	9
6	Antonia Niedermaier (GER)	Canyon//SRAM zondacrypto	9
7	Mischa Bredewold (NED)	Team SD Worx–Protime	7
8	Gaia Segato (ITA)	BePink–Imatra–Bongioanni	5
9	Eva van Agt (NED)	Visma–Lease a Bike	3
10	Célia Le Mouel (FRA)	Ceratizit Pro Cycling	3

=== Young rider classification ===
Final young rider classification (1-10)
Rank	Rider	Team	Time
1	Antonia Niedermaier (GER)	Canyon//SRAM zondacrypto	9h 56' 54"
2	Maud Oudeman (NED)	Visma–Lease a Bike	+ 37"
3	Isabella Holmgren (CAN)	Lidl–Trek	+ 37"
4	Gaia Segato (ITA)	BePink–Imatra–Bongioanni	+ 1' 22"
5	Stina Kagevi (SWE)	Team Coop–Repsol	+ 1' 35"
6	Eleonora Ciabocco (ITA)	Team Picnic–PostNL	+ 1' 36"
7	Nicole Steinmetz (USA)	Eneicat–CMTeam	+ 1' 58"
8	Carlotta Cipressi (ITA)	Human Powered Health	+ 3' 49"
9	Alena Ivanchenko	UAE Team ADQ	+ 3' 49"
10	Rosita Reijnhout (NED)	Visma–Lease a Bike	+ 3' 49"

=== Teams classification ===
Final teams classification (1-10)
Rank	Team	Time
1	(Germany) Ceratizit Pro Cycling	29h 52' 34"
2	(Belgium) AG Insurance–Soudal	+ 6"
3	(France) FDJ–Suez	+ 59"
4	(Germany) Canyon//SRAM zondacrypto	+ 1' 08"
5	(Australia) Liv AlUla Jayco	+ 1' 20"
6	(Norway) Team Coop–Repsol	+ 2' 31"
7	(United States) Lidl–Trek	+ 2' 34"
8	(Netherlands) Visma–Lease a Bike	+ 3' 58"
9	(Spain) Laboral Kutxa–Fundación Euskadi	+ 4' 45"
10	(Spain) Movistar Team	+ 6' 48"
