= 2025 Tour of Chongming Island =

2025 UCI Women's World Tour, race 26 of 27

Race details
- Dates: 14-16 October
- Stages: 3
- Distance: 348.6 km (216.6 mi)
- Winning time: 8h 02' 16"

Results
Jersey awarded to the overall winner	Winner	Anne Knijnenburg (NED)	(VolkerWessels Women Cyclingteam)
	Second	Sofie Van Rooijen (NED)	(UAE Team ADQ)
	Third	Tamara Dronova	(Roland Le Dévoluy)
Jersey awarded to the points classification winner	Points	Sofie Van Rooijen (NED)	(UAE Team ADQ)
Jersey awarded to the mountains classification winner	Mountains	Anne Knijnenburg (NED)	(VolkerWessels Women Cyclingteam)
Jersey awarded to the youth classification winner	Youth	Yelizaveta Sklyarova (KAZ)	(Born to Win BTC City Ljubljana Zhiraf)
	Team	(Australia) Liv AlUla Jayco	

The 2025 Tour of Chongming Island was the 16th edition of the Tour of Chongming Island road cycling stage race, and the 26th event of the 2025 UCI Women's World Tour. It began on 14 October in Chongming and finished on 16 October, also in Chongming.

== Teams ==
Five UCI Women's WorldTeams and twelve UCI Women's Continental Teams made up the seventeen teams that participated in the race.

UCI Women's WorldTeams

- UAE Team ADQ
- Lidl–Trek
- Liv AlUla Jayco
- Human Powered Health
- Roland Le Dévoluy

UCI Women's Continental Teams

- Laboral Kutxa–Fundación Euskadi
- VolkerWessels Women Cyclingteam
- Team Coop–Repsol
- BePink–Imatra–Bongioanni
- Thailand Women's Cycling Team
- Lotto Ladies
- Eneicat–CMTeam
- Aromitalia 3T Vaiano
- Born to Win BTC City Ljubljana Zhiraf
- China Liv Pro Cycling
- Li Ning Star Ladies
- Team Dukla Praha

== Route ==
Stage characteristics and winners
Stage	Date	Course	Distance	Type	Stage winner
1	14 October	Chongming to Chongming	108.6 km (67.5 mi)	Flat stage	Georgia Baker (AUS)
2	15 October	Shanghai to Chongming	128.6 km (79.9 mi)	Flat stage	Sofie Van Rooijen (NED)
3	17 October	Chongming to Chongming	111.4 km (69.2 mi)	Flat stage	Josie Talbot (AUS)
Total			348.6 km (216.6 mi)		

== Stages ==
=== Stage 1 ===
14 October — Chongming to Chongming, 108.6 km (67.5 mi)

Stage 1 Result
Rank	Rider	Team	Time
1	Georgia Baker (AUS)	Liv AlUla Jayco	2h 30' 55"
2	Sofie Van Rooijen (NED)	UAE Team ADQ	+ 0"
3	Mia Griffin (IRE)	Roland Le Dévoluy	+ 0"
4	Barbora Němcová (CZE)	Team Dukla Praha	+ 0"
5	Lonneke Uneken (NED)	VolkerWessels Women Cyclingteam	+ 0"
6	Vittoria Grassi (ITA)	BePink–Imatra–Bongioanni	+ 0"
7	Elisa Balsamo (ITA)	Lidl–Trek	+ 0"
8	Lani Wittevrongel (BEL)	Lotto Ladies	+ 0"
9	Argiro Milaki (GRE)	Aromitalia 3T Vaiano	+ 0"
10	Anne Van Rooijen (NED)	VolkerWessels Women Cyclingteam	+ 0"

General classification after Stage 1
Rank	Rider	Team	Time
1	Georgia Baker (AUS)	Liv AlUla Jayco	2h 30' 45"
2	Sofie Van Rooijen (NED)	UAE Team ADQ	+ 4"
3	Tamara Dronova	Roland Le Dévoluy	+ 4"
4	Mia Griffin (IRE)	Roland Le Dévoluy	+ 6"
5	Yelizaveta Sklyarova (KAZ)	Born to Win BTC City Ljubljana Zhiraf	+ 7"
6	Yanina Kuskova (UZB)	Laboral Kutxa–Fundación Euskadi	+ 8"
7	Laura Lizette Sander (EST)	Team Coop–Repsol	+ 9"
8	Barbora Němcová (CZE)	Team Dukla Praha	+ 10"
9	Lonneke Uneken (NED)	VolkerWessels Women Cyclingteam	+ 10"
10	Vittoria Grassi (ITA)	BePink–Imatra–Bongioanni	+ 10"

=== Stage 2 ===
15 October — Shanghai to Chongming, 128.6 km (79.9 mi)

Stage 2 Result
Rank	Rider	Team	Time
1	Sofie Van Rooijen (NED)	UAE Team ADQ	2h 57' 09"
2	Mia Griffin (IRE)	Roland Le Dévoluy	+ 0"
3	Elisa Balsamo (ITA)	Lidl–Trek	+ 0"
4	Cristina Tonetti (ITA)	Laboral Kutxa–Fundación Euskadi	+ 0"
5	Georgia Baker (AUS)	Liv AlUla Jayco	+ 0"
6	Lonneke Uneken (NED)	VolkerWessels Women Cyclingteam	+ 0"
7	Kathrin Schweinberger (AUT)	Human Powered Health	+ 0"
8	Kaja Rysz (POL)	Roland Le Dévoluy	+ 0"
9	Valentina Basilico (ITA)	Eneicat–CMTeam	+ 0"
10	Laura Tomasi (ITA)	Laboral Kutxa–Fundación Euskadi	+ 0"

General classification after Stage 2
Rank	Rider	Team	Time
1	Sofie Van Rooijen (NED)	UAE Team ADQ	5h 27' 45"
2	Georgia Baker (AUS)	Liv AlUla Jayco	+ 8"
3	Mia Griffin (IRE)	Roland Le Dévoluy	+ 9"
4	Elisa Balsamo (ITA)	Lidl–Trek	+ 13"
5	Tamara Dronova	Roland Le Dévoluy	+ 13"
6	Yelizaveta Sklyarova (KAZ)	Born to Win BTC City Ljubljana Zhiraf	+ 16"
7	Anne Knijnenburg (NED)	VolkerWessels Women Cyclingteam	+ 16"
8	Yanina Kuskova (UZB)	Laboral Kutxa–Fundación Euskadi	+ 17"
9	Emma Norsgaard (DEN)	Lidl–Trek	+ 17"
10	Dominika Włodarczyk (POL)	UAE Team ADQ	+ 18"

=== Stage 3 ===
16 October — Chongming to Chongming, 111.4 km (69.2 mi)

Stage 3 Result
Rank	Rider	Team	Time
1	Josie Talbot (AUS)	Liv AlUla Jayco	2h 34' 19"
2	Riejanne Markus (NED)	Lidl–Trek	+ 0"
3	Anne Knijnenburg (NED)	VolkerWessels Women Cyclingteam	+ 0"
4	Karlijn Swinkels (NED)	UAE Team ADQ	+ 0"
5	Tamara Dronova	Roland Le Dévoluy	+ 0"
6	Mieke Docx (BEL)	Lotto Ladies	+ 0"
7	Iurani Blanco (ESP)	Human Powered Health	+ 0"
8	Quinty Ton (NED)	Liv AlUla Jayco	+ 0"
9	Daniela Campos (POR)	Eneicat–CMTeam	+ 0"
10	Georgia Baker (AUS)	Liv AlUla Jayco	+ 15"

General classification after Stage 3
Rank	Rider	Team	Time
1	Anne Knijnenburg (NED)	VolkerWessels Women Cyclingteam	8h 02' 16"
2	Sofie van Rooijen (NED)	UAE Team ADQ	+ 1"
3	Tamara Dronova	Roland Le Dévoluy	+ 1"
4	Riejanne Markus (NED)	Lidl–Trek	+ 1"
5	Mieke Docx (BEL)	Lotto Ladies	+ 7"
6	Karlijn Swinkels (NED)	UAE Team ADQ	+ 7"
7	Quinty Ton (NED)	Liv AlUla Jayco	+ 7"
8	Daniela Campos (POR)	Eneicat–CMTeam	+ 7"
9	Elisa Balsamo (ITA)	Lidl–Trek	+ 8"
10	Georgia Baker (AUS)	Liv AlUla Jayco	+ 9"

== Classification leadership table ==
Classification leadership by stage
Stage	Winner	General classification	Points classification	Mountains classification	Young rider classification	Team classification
1	Georgia Baker	Georgia Baker	Georgia Baker	Anne Knijnenburg	Yelizaveta Sklyarova	Roland Le Dévoluy
2	Sofie Van Rooijen	Sofie Van Rooijen	Sofie Van Rooijen	Anne Knijnenburg	Yelizaveta Sklyarova	Roland Le Dévoluy
3	Josie Talbot	Anne Knijnenburg	Sofie Van Rooijen	Anne Knijnenburg	Yelizaveta Sklyarova	Liv AlUla Jayco
Final		Anne Knijnenburg	Sofie Van Rooijen	Anne Knijnenburg	Yelizaveta Sklyarova	Liv AlUla Jayco

== Classification standings ==
Legend
Denotes the winner of the general classification	Denotes the winner of the young rider classification
Denotes the winner of the points classification	Denotes the winner of the mountains classification

=== General classification ===
Final general classification (1–10)
Rank	Rider	Team	Time
1	Anne Knijnenburg (NED)	VolkerWessels Women Cyclingteam	8h 02' 16"
2	Sofie Van Rooijen (NED)	UAE Team ADQ	+ 1"
3	Tamara Dronova	Roland Le Dévoluy	+ 1"
4	Riejanne Markus (NED)	Lidl–Trek	+ 1"
5	Mieke Docx (BEL)	Lotto Ladies	+ 7"
6	Karlijn Swinkels (NED)	UAE Team ADQ	+ 7"
7	Quinty Ton (NED)	Liv AlUla Jayco	+ 7"
8	Daniela Campos (POR)	Eneicat–CMTeam	+ 7"
9	Elisa Balsamo (ITA)	Lidl–Trek	+ 8"
10	Georgia Baker (AUS)	Liv AlUla Jayco	+ 9"

=== Points classification ===
Final general classification (1–10)
Rank	Rider	Team	Points
1	Sofie Van Rooijen (NED)	UAE Team ADQ	34
2	Elisa Balsamo (ITA)	Lidl–Trek	30
3	Mia Griffin (IRE)	Roland Le Dévoluy	27
4	Georgia Baker (AUS)	Liv AlUla Jayco	25
5	Tamara Dronova	Roland Le Dévoluy	16
6	Anne Knijnenburg (NED)	VolkerWessels Women Cyclingteam	15
7	Josie Talbot (AUS)	Liv AlUla Jayco	14
8	Riejanne Markus (NED)	Lidl–Trek	12
9	Lonneke Uneken (NED)	VolkerWessels Women Cyclingteam	11
10	Karlijn Swinkels (NED)	UAE Team ADQ	8

=== Mountains classification ===
Final mountains classification
Rank	Rider	Team	Points
1	Anne Knijnenburg (NED)	VolkerWessels Women Cyclingteam	2
2	Meis Poland (NED)	VolkerWessels Women Cyclingteam	1

=== Young rider classification ===
Final young rider classification (1–10)
Rank	Rider	Team	Time
1	Yelizaveta Sklyarova (KAZ)	Born to Win BTC City Ljubljana Zhiraf	8h 02' 35"
2	Laura Lizette Sander (EST)	Team Coop–Repsol	+ 2"
3	Lani Wittevrongel (BEL)	Lotto Ladies	+ 3"
4	Barbora Němcová (CZE)	Team Dukla Praha	+ 3"
5	Vittoria Grassi (ITA)	BePink–Imatra–Bongioanni	+ 3"
6	Virginia Iaccarino (ITA)	Aromitalia 3T Vaiano	+ 3"
7	Elisabeth Ebras (EST)	BePink–Imatra–Bongioanni	+ 3"
8	Andrea Casagranda (ITA)	BePink–Imatra–Bongioanni	+ 3"
9	Valentina Zanzi (ITA)	Aromitalia 3T Vaiano	+ 3"
10	Valentina Basilico (ITA)	Eneicat–CMTeam	+ 3"

=== Team classification ===
Final team classification (1–10)
Rank	Team	Time
1	(Australia) Liv AlUla Jayco	24h 07' 24"
2	(Switzerland) Roland Le Dévoluy	+ 15"
3	(Netherlands) VolkerWessels Women Cyclingteam	+ 15"
4	(United Arab Emirates) UAE Team ADQ	+ 15"
5	(Belgium) Lotto Ladies	+ 15"
6	(United States) Lidl–Trek	+ 15"
7	(Spain) Eneicat–CMTeam	+ 15"
8	(United States) Human Powered Health	+ 15"
9	(Spain) Laboral Kutxa–Fundación Euskadi	+ 0"
10	(Italy) Aromitalia 3T Vaiano	+ 0"
