= 2025 UCI Women's World Tour =

Series of women's road cycling races

- Tenth edition of the UCI Women's World Tour

Details
- Dates: 17 January – 19 October 2025
- Location: Europe; Oceania; Asia
- Races: 27

The 2025 UCI Women's World Tour was a competition with twenty-seven road cycling events throughout the 2025 women's cycling season. The competition began with the Women's Tour Down Under from 17 to 19 January, and finished with the Tour of Guangxi on 19 October. It was the tenth edition of the UCI Women's World Tour – launched by the Union Cycliste Internationale (UCI) in 2016 – but for the first time was not a ranking competition in its own right, with the rankings having been removed from the UCI's Road Race regulations.

At the end of the season, Dutch rider Demi Vollering of FDJ–Suez led the overall road world rankings ahead of Dutch rider Lorena Wiebes of Team SD Worx–Protime (who won five World Tour events, the most of any rider) and Swiss rider Marlen Reusser of Movistar Team.

== Events ==
The initial race calendar for the 2025 season was announced in June 2024, with twenty-nine races initially scheduled. The calendar was similar to 2024, with the scheduled return of the Tour of Scandinavia following a hiatus in 2024 due to a lack of funding. Organisers of the Tour de France Femmes announced that the race would be extended to nine days in length, becoming the longest event on the calendar.

Following the announcement, the RideLondon Classique was cancelled by organisers, as it was not possible to run the race on the June date offered by the UCI. In July 2024, the Ronde van Drenthe was removed from the calendar as a result of economic reasons. In October 2024, the final calendar was announced with the addition of two new events – the previously rumoured women's edition of Milan–San Remo (last held in 2005), and a new one-day race in Denmark, the Copenhagen Sprint. Other rumoured events such as promotion of the Thüringen Ladies Tour from the UCI Women's ProSeries did not occur.

In January 2025, it was announced that the Tour of Scandinavia would not be revived due to lack of interest from sponsors and host broadcasters, reducing the calendar to twenty-seven races.

Races in the 2025 UCI Women's World Tour
Race	Date	First	Second	Third
(Australia) Women's Tour Down Under	17–19 January	Noemi Rüegg (SUI)	Silke Smulders (NED)	Mie Bjørndal Ottestad (NOR)
(Australia) Cadel Evans Great Ocean Road Race	1 February	Ally Wollaston (NZL)	Karlijn Swinkels (NED)	Noemi Rüegg (SUI)
(United Arab Emirates) UAE Tour Women	6–9 February	Elisa Longo Borghini (ITA)	Silvia Persico (ITA)	Kimberley Le Court (MRI)
(Belgium) Omloop Het Nieuwsblad	1 March	Lotte Claes (BEL)	Aurela Nerlo (POL)	Demi Vollering (NED)
(Italy) Strade Bianche Donne	8 March	Demi Vollering (NED)	Anna van der Breggen (NED)	Pauline Ferrand-Prévot (FRA)
(Italy) Trofeo Alfredo Binda-Comune di Cittiglio	16 March	Elisa Balsamo (ITA)	Blanka Vas (HUN)	Cat Ferguson (GBR)
(Italy) Milan–San Remo Women	22 March	Lorena Wiebes (NED)	Marianne Vos (NED)	Noemi Rüegg (SUI)
(Belgium) Classic Brugge–De Panne	27 March	Lorena Wiebes (NED)	Chiara Consonni (ITA)	Elisa Balsamo (ITA)
(Belgium) Gent–Wevelgem	30 March	Lorena Wiebes (NED)	Elisa Balsamo (ITA)	Charlotte Kool (NED)
(Belgium) Tour of Flanders	6 April	Lotte Kopecky (BEL)	Pauline Ferrand-Prévot (FRA)	Liane Lippert (GER)
(France) Paris–Roubaix Femmes	12 April	Pauline Ferrand-Prévot (FRA)	Letizia Borghesi (ITA)	Lorena Wiebes (NED)
(Netherlands) Amstel Gold Race	20 April	Mischa Bredewold (NED)	Ellen van Dijk (NED)	Puck Pieterse (NED)
(Belgium) La Flèche Wallonne Femmes	23 April	Puck Pieterse (NED)	Demi Vollering (NED)	Elisa Longo Borghini (ITA)
(Belgium) Liège–Bastogne–Liège Femmes	27 April	Kimberley Le Court (MRI)	Puck Pieterse (NED)	Demi Vollering (NED)
(Spain) La Vuelta Femenina	4–10 May	Demi Vollering (NED)	Marlen Reusser (SUI)	Anna van der Breggen (NED)
(Spain) Itzulia Women	16–18 May	Demi Vollering (NED)	Mischa Bredewold (NED)	Sarah Van Dam (CAN)
(Spain) Vuelta a Burgos Feminas	22–25 May	Marlen Reusser (SUI)	Elisa Longo Borghini (ITA)	Yara Kastelijn (NED)
(United Kingdom) Tour of Britain Women	5–8 June	Ally Wollaston (NZL)	Cat Ferguson (GBR)	Karlijn Swinkels (NED)
(Switzerland) Tour de Suisse Women	12–15 June	Marlen Reusser (SUI)	Demi Vollering (NED)	Katarzyna Niewiadoma (POL)
(Denmark) Copenhagen Sprint	21 June	Lorena Wiebes (NED)	Elisa Balsamo (ITA)	Chiara Consonni (ITA)
(Italy) Giro d'Italia Women	6–13 July	Elisa Longo Borghini (ITA)	Marlen Reusser (SUI)	Sarah Gigante (AUS)
Tour de France Femmes	26 July – 3 August	Pauline Ferrand-Prévot (FRA)	Demi Vollering (NED)	Katarzyna Niewiadoma (POL)
(Switzerland) Tour de Romandie Féminin	15–17 August	Elise Chabbey (SUI)	Urška Žigart (SLO)	Yara Kastelijn (NED)
(France) Classic Lorient Agglomération	30 August	Mischa Bredewold (NED)	Marianne Vos (NED)	Eline Jansen (NED)
(Netherlands) Simac Ladies Tour	2–7 September	Lorena Wiebes (NED)	Elisa Balsamo (ITA)	Megan Jastrab (USA)
(China) Tour of Chongming Island	14–16 October	Anne Knijnenburg (NED)	Sofie van Rooijen (NED)	Tamara Dronova
(China) Tour of Guangxi	19 October	Anna Henderson (GBR)	Caroline Andersson (SWE)	Usoa Ostolaza (ESP)

== 2025 UCI Women's WorldTeams ==
The fifteen Women's WorldTeams were automatically invited to compete in events, with the top two UCI Women's ProTeams listed on the 2024 UCI World Ranking (EF Education–Oatly and VolkerWessels Women Cyclingteam) also invited automatically. Other Continental women's teams were invited by the organisers of each race.

- AG Insurance–Soudal
- Canyon//SRAM Zondacrypto
- Ceratizit Pro Cycling
- FDJ-Suez
- Fenix–Deceuninck
- Human Powered Health
- Lidl–Trek
- Liv AlUla Jayco
- Movistar Team
- Roland Le Dévoluy
- Team Picnic–PostNL
- Team SD Worx–Protime
- UAE Team ADQ
- Uno-X Mobility
- Visma–Lease a Bike

== Changes for 2025 ==
The individual women's elite classification and youth classification (where the leader of each wore a distinctive jersey) was abolished, with the UCI women's road world rankings superseding them as the official rankings table for the sport. A second tier of women's teams was added below the UCI Women's WorldTeams, with seven UCI Women's ProTeams.
