= 2026 Vuelta a Burgos Feminas =

Cycling race

2026 UCI Women's World Tour, race 18 of 26

Race details
- Dates: 21-24 May 2026
- Stages: 4
- Distance: 495 km (308 mi)
- Winning time: 13h 20' 04"

Results
Jersey awarded to the overall winner	Winner	Yara Kastelijn (NED)	(Fenix–Premier Tech)
	Second	Évita Muzic (FRA)	(FDJ United–Suez)
	Third	Usoa Ostolaza (SPA)	(Laboral Kutxa–Fundación Euskadi)
Jersey awarded to the points classification winner	Points	Lorena Wiebes (NED)	(Team SD Worx–Protime)
Jersey awarded to the mountains classification winner	Mountains	Yara Kastelijn (NED)	(Fenix–Premier Tech)
Jersey awarded to the young rider classification winner	Young rider	Shirin van Anrooij (NED)	(Lidl–Trek)
	Team	(Australia) Liv AlUla Jayco	

The 2026 Vuelta a Burgos Feminas was a Spanish women's cycle stage race held in the Province of Burgos in northern Spain from 21 to 24 May. It was the 11th edition of Vuelta a Burgos Feminas, and the 18th event of the 2026 UCI Women's World Tour.

The race was won by Dutch rider Yara Kastelijn of Fenix–Premier Tech. Kastelijn also won the mountains classification. The points classification was won by Dutch rider Lorena Wiebes of Team SD Worx–Protime, the youth classification by Dutch rider Shirin van Anrooij of Lidl–Trek, and the team classification was won by Liv AlUla Jayco.

== Teams ==
Thirteen UCI Women's WorldTeams, three UCI Women's ProTeams and four UCI Women's Continental Teams made up the 20 teams who participated in the race.

UCI Women's WorldTeams

- AG Insurance–Soudal
- Canyon//SRAM Zondacrypto
- EF Education–Oatly
- FDJ United–Suez
- Fenix–Premier Tech
- Human Powered Health
- Lidl–Trek
- Liv AlUla Jayco
- Movistar Team
- Team SD Worx–Protime
- UAE Team ADQ
- Uno-X Mobility
- Visma–Lease a Bike

UCI Women's ProTeams

- Laboral Kutxa–Fundación Euskadi
- Mayenne Monbana My Pie
- St. Michel–Preference Home–Auber93

UCI Women's Continental Teams

- DAS–Hutchinson
- Hitec Products–Fluid Control
- Top Girls Fassa Bortolo
- Vini Fantini–BePink

== Route ==
Stage characteristics and winners
Stage	Date	Course	Distance	Type	Stage winner
1	21 May	Burgos	127 km (79 mi)	Hilly stage	Lorena Wiebes (NED)
2	22 May	Castrojeriz to Bodega Viña Pedrosa. Pedrosa de Duero	122 km (76 mi)	Hilly stage	Lorena Wiebes (NED)
3	23 May	Busto de Bureba to Medina de Pomar	126 km (78 mi)	Hilly stage	Mischa Bredewold (NED)
4	24 May	Gumiel de Mercado to Lagunas de Neila	120 km (75 mi)	Mountain stage	Yara Kastelijn (NED)
Total			495 km (308 mi)		

== Stages ==
=== Stage 1 ===
21 May 2026 – Burgos, 127 kilometres (79 mi)

Stage 1 result
Rank	Rider	Team	Time
1	Lorena Wiebes (NED)	Team SD Worx–Protime	3h 14' 41"
2	Chiara Consonni (ITA)	Canyon//SRAM Zondacrypto	+ 0"
3	Georgia Baker (AUS)	Liv AlUla Jayco	+ 0"
4	Margaux Vigié (FRA)	Visma–Lease a Bike	+ 0"
5	Shari Bossuyt (BEL)	AG Insurance–Soudal	+ 0"
6	Megan Jastrab (USA)	UAE Team ADQ	+ 0"
7	Cristina Tonetti (ITA)	Laboral Kutxa–Fundación Euskadi	+ 0"
8	Susanne Andersen (NOR)	Uno-X Mobility	+ 0"
9	Silvia Zanardi (ITA)	Human Powered Health	+ 0"
10	Ally Wollaston (NZL)	FDJ United–Suez	+ 0"

General classification after stage 1
Rank	Rider	Team	Time
1	Lorena Wiebes (NED)	Team SD Worx–Protime	3h 14' 31"
2	Chiara Consonni (ITA)	Canyon//SRAM Zondacrypto	+ 4"
3	Georgia Baker (AUS)	Liv AlUla Jayco	+ 6"
4	Dominika Włodarczyk (POL)	UAE Team ADQ	+ 7"
5	Alena Ivanchenko	UAE Team ADQ	+ 8"
6	Anniina Ahtosalo (FIN)	Uno-X Mobility	+ 9"
7	Margaux Vigié (FRA)	Visma–Lease a Bike	+ 10"
8	Shari Bossuyt (BEL)	AG Insurance–Soudal	+ 10"
9	Megan Jastrab (USA)	UAE Team ADQ	+ 10"
10	Cristina Tonetti (ITA)	Laboral Kutxa–Fundación Euskadi	+ 10"

=== Stage 2 ===
22 May 2026 – Castrojeriz to Bodega Viña Pedrosa. Pedrosa de Duero, 122 kilometres (76 mi)

Stage 2 result
Rank	Rider	Team	Time
1	Lorena Wiebes (NED)	Team SD Worx–Protime	3h 05' 29"
2	Elisa Balsamo (ITA)	Lidl–Trek	+ 0"
3	Ally Wollaston (NZL)	FDJ United–Suez	+ 0"
4	Agnieszka Skalniak-Sójka (POL)	Canyon//SRAM Zondacrypto	+ 0"
5	Chiara Consonni (ITA)	Canyon//SRAM Zondacrypto	+ 0"
6	Babette van der Wolf (NED)	EF Education–Oatly	+ 0"
7	Shari Bossuyt (BEL)	AG Insurance–Soudal	+ 0"
8	Millie Couzens (GBR)	Fenix–Premier Tech	+ 0"
9	Cristina Tonetti (ITA)	Laboral Kutxa–Fundación Euskadi	+ 0"
10	Margaux Vigié (FRA)	Visma–Lease a Bike	+ 0"

General classification after stage 2
Rank	Rider	Team	Time
1	Lorena Wiebes (NED)	Team SD Worx–Protime	6h 19' 50"
2	Chiara Consonni (ITA)	Canyon//SRAM Zondacrypto	+ 14"
3	Elisa Balsamo (ITA)	Lidl–Trek	+ 14"
4	Ally Wollaston (NZL)	FDJ United–Suez	+ 16"
5	Dominika Włodarczyk (POL)	UAE Team ADQ	+ 17"
6	Alena Ivanchenko	UAE Team ADQ	+ 18"
7	Shari Bossuyt (BEL)	AG Insurance–Soudal	+ 20"
8	Margaux Vigié (FRA)	Visma–Lease a Bike	+ 20"
9	Cristina Tonetti (ITA)	Laboral Kutxa–Fundación Euskadi	+ 20"
10	Megan Jastrab (USA)	UAE Team ADQ	+ 20"

=== Stage 3 ===
23 May 2026 – Busto de Bureba to Medina de Pomar, 126 kilometres (78 mi)

Stage 3 result
Rank	Rider	Team	Time
1	Mischa Bredewold (NED)	Team SD Worx–Protime	3h 23' 05"
2	Mireia Benito (SPA)	AG Insurance–Soudal	+ 0"
3	Lorena Wiebes (NED)	Team SD Worx–Protime	+ 11"
4	Ashleigh Moolman-Pasio (SAF)	AG Insurance–Soudal	+ 12"
5	Usoa Ostolaza (SPA)	Laboral Kutxa–Fundación Euskadi	+ 12"
6	Cédrine Kerbaol (FRA)	EF Education–Oatly	+ 12"
7	Shirin van Anrooij (NED)	Lidl–Trek	+ 12"
8	Maud Oudeman (NED)	Visma–Lease a Bike	+ 12"
9	Caroline Andersson (SWE)	Liv AlUla Jayco	+ 12"
10	Évita Muzic (FRA)	FDJ United–Suez	+ 12"

General classification after stage 3
Rank	Rider	Team	Time
1	Lorena Wiebes (NED)	Team SD Worx–Protime	9h 43' 02"
2	Mischa Bredewold (NED)	Team SD Worx–Protime	+ 3"
3	Mireia Benito (SPA)	AG Insurance–Soudal	+ 7"
4	Cédrine Kerbaol (FRA)	EF Education–Oatly	+ 25"
5	Usoa Ostolaza (SPA)	Laboral Kutxa–Fundación Euskadi	+ 25"
6	Caroline Andersson (SWE)	Liv AlUla Jayco	+ 25"
7	Shirin van Anrooij (NED)	Lidl–Trek	+ 25"
8	Yara Kastelijn (NED)	Fenix–Premier Tech	+ 25"
9	Amanda Spratt (AUS)	Lidl–Trek	+ 25"
10	Maud Oudeman (NED)	Visma–Lease a Bike	+ 25"

=== Stage 4 ===
24 May 2026 – Gumiel de Mercado to Lagunas de Neila, 120 kilometres (75 mi)

Stage 4 result
Rank	Rider	Team	Time
1	Yara Kastelijn (NED)	Fenix–Premier Tech	3h 36' 47"
2	Évita Muzic (FRA)	FDJ United–Suez	+ 16"
3	Usoa Ostolaza (SPA)	Laboral Kutxa–Fundación Euskadi	+ 25"
4	Mireia Benito (SPA)	AG Insurance–Soudal	+ 52"
5	Mischa Bredewold (NED)	Team SD Worx–Protime	+ 1' 01"
6	Maëva Squiban (FRA)	UAE Team ADQ	+ 1' 03"
7	Amanda Spratt (AUS)	Lidl–Trek	+ 1' 03"
8	Shirin van Anrooij (NED)	Lidl–Trek	+ 1' 03"
9	Alice Towers (GBR)	EF Education–Oatly	+ 1' 14"
10	Cédrine Kerbaol (FRA)	EF Education–Oatly	+ 1' 14"

General classification after stage 4
Rank	Rider	Team	Time
1	Yara Kastelijn (NED)	Fenix–Premier Tech	13h 20' 04"
2	Évita Muzic (FRA)	FDJ United–Suez	+ 20"
3	Usoa Ostolaza (SPA)	Laboral Kutxa–Fundación Euskadi	+ 31"
4	Mireia Benito (SPA)	AG Insurance–Soudal	+ 44"
5	Mischa Bredewold (NED)	Team SD Worx–Protime	+ 49"
6	Shirin van Anrooij (NED)	Lidl–Trek	+ 1' 13"
7	Amanda Spratt (AUS)	Lidl–Trek	+ 1' 13"
8	Cédrine Kerbaol (FRA)	EF Education–Oatly	+ 1' 24"
9	Nadia Gontova (CAN)	Liv AlUla Jayco	+ 1' 24"
10	Maud Oudeman (NED)	Visma–Lease a Bike	+ 1' 41"

== Classification leadership table ==
Classification leadership by stage
Stage	Winner	General classification	Points classification	Mountains classification	Young rider classification	Team classification
1	Lorena Wiebes	Lorena Wiebes	Lorena Wiebes	Oda Aune Gissinger	Alena Ivanchenko	Human Powered Health
2	Lorena Wiebes	Lorena Wiebes	Lorena Wiebes	Oda Aune Gissinger	Alena Ivanchenko	Human Powered Health
3	Mischa Bredewold	Lorena Wiebes	Lorena Wiebes	Oda Aune Gissinger	Shirin van Anrooij	Liv AlUla Jayco
4	Yara Kastelijn	Yara Kastelijn	Lorena Wiebes	Yara Kastelijn	Shirin van Anrooij	Liv AlUla Jayco
Final		Yara Kastelijn	Lorena Wiebes	Yara Kastelijn	Shirin van Anrooij	Liv AlUla Jayco

== Classification standings ==
Legend
Denotes the winner of the general classification	Denotes the winner of the mountains classification
Denotes the winner of the points classification	Denotes the winner of the young rider classification

=== General classification ===
Final general classification (1–10)
Rank	Rider	Team	Time
1	Yara Kastelijn (NED)	Fenix–Premier Tech	13h 20' 04"
2	Évita Muzic (FRA)	FDJ United–Suez	+ 20"
3	Usoa Ostolaza (SPA)	Laboral Kutxa–Fundación Euskadi	+ 31"
4	Mireia Benito (SPA)	AG Insurance–Soudal	+ 44"
5	Mischa Bredewold (NED)	Team SD Worx–Protime	+ 49"
6	Shirin van Anrooij (NED)	Lidl–Trek	+ 1' 13"
7	Amanda Spratt (AUS)	Lidl–Trek	+ 1' 13"
8	Cédrine Kerbaol (FRA)	EF Education–Oatly	+ 1' 24"
9	Nadia Gontova (CAN)	Liv AlUla Jayco	+ 1' 24"
10	Maud Oudeman (NED)	Visma–Lease a Bike	+ 1' 41"

=== Points classification ===
Final points classification (1–10)
Rank	Rider	Team	Points
1	Lorena Wiebes (NED)	Team SD Worx–Protime	66
2	Mischa Bredewold (NED)	Team SD Worx–Protime	37
3	Mireia Benito (SPA)	AG Insurance–Soudal	34
4	Chiara Consonni (ITA)	Canyon//SRAM Zondacrypto	32
5	Yara Kastelijn (NED)	Fenix–Premier Tech	30
6	Usoa Ostolaza (SPA)	Laboral Kutxa–Fundación Euskadi	28
7	Évita Muzic (FRA)	FDJ United–Suez	26
8	Ally Wollaston (NZL)	FDJ United–Suez	22
9	Shari Bossuyt (BEL)	AG Insurance–Soudal	21
10	Margaux Vigié (FRA)	Visma–Lease a Bike	20

=== Mountains classification ===
Final mountains classification (1–10)
Rank	Rider	Team	Points
1	Yara Kastelijn (NED)	Fenix–Premier Tech	30
2	Évita Muzic (FRA)	FDJ United–Suez	25
3	Mireia Benito (SPA)	AG Insurance–Soudal	22
4	Usoa Ostolaza (SPA)	Laboral Kutxa–Fundación Euskadi	20
5	Oda Aune Gissinger (NOR)	Hitec Products–Fluid Control	18
6	Irene Cagnazzo (ITA)	Vini Fantini–BePink	16
7	Mischa Bredewold (NED)	Team SD Worx–Protime	12
8	Caroline Andersson (SWE)	Liv AlUla Jayco	10
9	Sara Martín (SPA)	Movistar Team	10
10	Federica Venturelli (ITA)	UAE Team ADQ	10

=== Young rider classification ===
Final young rider classification (1–10)
Rank	Rider	Team	Time
1	Shirin van Anrooij (NED)	Lidl–Trek	13h 21' 17"
2	Maud Oudeman (NED)	Visma–Lease a Bike	+ 28"
3	Alice Towers (GBR)	EF Education–Oatly	+ 56"
4	Chiara Reghini (ITA)	Top Girls Fassa Bortolo	+ 1' 35"
5	Katharina Sadnik (AUT)	Visma–Lease a Bike	+ 1' 54"
6	Paula Ostiz (SPA)	Movistar Team	+ 4' 18"
7	Rosita Reijnhout (NED)	Visma–Lease a Bike	+ 4' 30"
8	Titia Ryo (FRA)	Human Powered Health	+ 5' 46"
9	Wilma Aintila (FIN)	Canyon//SRAM Zondacrypto	+ 7' 02"
10	Oda Aune Gissinger (NOR)	Hitec Products–Fluid Control	+ 7' 59"

=== Team classification ===
Final team classification (1–10)
Rank	Team	Time
1	(Australia) Liv AlUla Jayco	40h 08' 37"
2	(United States) EF Education–Oatly	+ 2' 03"
3	(Netherlands) Visma–Lease a Bike	+ 2' 06"
4	(Germany) Lidl–Trek	+ 3' 31"
5	(Belgium) Fenix–Premier Tech	+ 3' 45"
6	(Belgium) AG Insurance–Soudal	+ 5' 50"
7	(United States) Human Powered Health	+ 7' 19"
8	(Spain) Movistar Team	+ 9' 23"
9	(France) FDJ United–Suez	+ 10' 52"
10	(Spain) Laboral Kutxa–Fundación Euskadi	+ 11' 31"

== See also ==
- 2026 in women's road cycling
