= 2025 Classic Lorient Agglomération =

2025 UCI Women's World Tour, race 23 of 27

Race details
- Dates: 30 August 2025
- Stages: 1
- Distance: 166 km (103 mi)
- Winning time: 4h 22' 48"

Results
	Winner	Mischa Bredewold (NED)	(Team SD Worx–Protime)
	Second	Marianne Vos (NED)	(Visma–Lease a Bike)
	Third	Eline Jansen (NED)	(VolkerWessels Women Cyclingteam)

The 2025 Classic Lorient Agglomération–CERATIZIT was the 24th edition of the Classic Lorient Agglomération road cycling one day race, which was held on 30 August as part of the 2025 UCI Women's World Tour calendar.

At 165 kilometres (103 mi) long, the race was the longest edition yet, and included more than 2,500 metres (8,200 ft) of climbing.

== Teams ==
Fifteen UCI Women's WorldTeams and seven UCI Women's Continental Teams made up the twenty-two teams that took part in the race.

UCI Women's World Teams

- AG Insurance–Soudal
- Canyon//SRAM zondacrypto
- Ceratizit Pro Cycling
- FDJ–Suez
- Fenix–Deceuninck
- Human Powered Health
- Lidl–Trek
- Liv AlUla Jayco
- Movistar Team
- Roland Le Dévoluy
- Team Picnic–PostNL
- Team SD Worx–Protime
- UAE Team ADQ
- Uno-X Mobility
- Visma–Lease a Bike

UCI Women's Continental Teams

- Arkéa–B&B Hotels Women
- Cofidis
- EF Education–Oatly
- Laboral Kutxa–Fundación Euskadi
- St. Michel–Preference Home–Auber93
- VolkerWessels Women Cyclingteam
- Winspace Orange Seal

== Results ==
Result
Rank	Rider	Team	Time
1	Mischa Bredewold (NED)	Team SD Worx–Protime	4h 22' 48"
2	Marianne Vos (NED)	Visma–Lease a Bike	+ 0"
3	Eline Jansen (NED)	VolkerWessels Women Cyclingteam	+ 0"
4	Eleonora Gasparrini (ITA)	UAE Team ADQ	+ 0"
5	Cédrine Kerbaol (FRA)	EF Education–Oatly	+ 0"
6	Chloé Dygert (USA)	Canyon//SRAM zondacrypto	+ 0"
7	Pfeiffer Georgi (GBR)	Team Picnic–PostNL	+ 0"
8	Franziska Koch (GER)	Team Picnic–PostNL	+ 0"
9	Caroline Andersson (SWE)	Liv AlUla Jayco	+ 0"
10	Juliette Labous (FRA)	FDJ–Suez	+ 0"
