= 2024 Classic Lorient Agglomération =

2024 UCI Women's World Tour, race 23 of 27

Race details
- Dates: 24 August 2024
- Stages: 1
- Distance: 158 km (98 mi)
- Winning time: 4h 15' 46"

Results
	Winner	Mischa Bredewold (NED)	(Team SD Worx–Protime)
	Second	Chloé Dygert (USA)	(Canyon//SRAM)
	Third	Liane Lippert (GER)	(Movistar Team)

The 2024 Classic Lorient Agglomération–Trophée CERATIZIT was the 23nd edition of the Classic Lorient Agglomération road cycling one day race, which was held on 24 August 2024 as part of the 2024 UCI Women's World Tour calendar.

== Teams ==
Thirteen UCI Women's WorldTeams and eight UCI Women's Continental Teams made up the twenty-one teams took part in the race.

UCI Women's World Teams

- AG Insurance–Soudal
- Canyon//SRAM
- Ceratizit–WNT Pro Cycling
- FDJ–Suez
- Fenix–Deceuninck
- Human Powered Health
- Lidl–Trek
- Liv AlUla Jayco
- Movistar Team
- Team dsm–firmenich PostNL
- Team SD Worx–Protime
- UAE Team ADQ
- Uno-X Mobility

UCI Women's Continental Teams

- Arkéa–B&B Hotels Women
- Cofidis
- DAS–Hutchinson–Brother–UK
- EF Education–Cannondale
- Laboral Kutxa–Fundación Euskadi
- St. Michel–Mavic–Auber93
- VolkerWessels Women Cyclingteam
- Winspace

== Results ==
Result
Rank	Rider	Team	Time
1	Mischa Bredewold (NED)	Team SD Worx–Protime	4h 15' 46"
2	Chloé Dygert (USA)	Canyon//SRAM	+ 0"
3	Liane Lippert (GER)	Movistar Team	+ 4"
4	Elisa Balsamo (ITA)	Lidl–Trek	+ 9"
5	Karlijn Swinkels (NED)	UAE Team ADQ	+ 9"
6	Eleonora Gasparrini (ITA)	UAE Team ADQ	+ 9"
7	Iurani Blanco (ESP)	Laboral Kutxa–Fundación Euskadi	+ 9"
8	Letizia Borghesi (ITA)	EF Education–Cannondale	+ 9"
9	Cédrine Kerbaol (FRA)	Ceratizit–WNT Pro Cycling	+ 9"
10	Nadia Quagliotto (ITA)	Laboral Kutxa–Fundación Euskadi	+ 9"
