= 2024 Itzulia Women =

Cycling race

2024 UCI Women's World Tour, race 16 of 27

Race details
- Dates: 10–12 May 2024
- Stages: 3
- Distance: 358.9 km (223.0 mi)
- Winning time: 9h 03' 42"

Results
Jersey awarded to the overall winner	Winner	Demi Vollering (NED)	(Team SD Worx–Protime)
	Second	Mischa Bredewold (NED)	(Team SD Worx–Protime)
	Third	Juliette Labous (FRA)	(Team dsm–firmenich PostNL)
Jersey awarded to the points classification winner	Points	Demi Vollering (NED)	(Team SD Worx–Protime)
Jersey awarded to the mountains classification winner	Mountains	Demi Vollering (NED)	(Team SD Worx–Protime)
Jersey awarded to the youth classification winner	Youth	Ella Wyllie (NZL)	(Liv AlUla Jayco)
	Team	(Netherlands) Team SD Worx–Protime	

The 2024 Itzulia Women was a Spanish women's cycle stage race held in the Basque Country from 10 to 12 May. It was the third edition of Itzulia Women, and the 16th event in the 2024 UCI Women's World Tour.

The race was won by Dutch rider Demi Vollering of Team SD Worx–Protime for the second time, with Vollering also winning the points and mountains classifications. SD Worx–Protime also won the teams classification, with the team winning all three stages for the third year in a row. The youth classification was won by New Zealand rider Ella Wyllie of Liv AlUla Jayco.

== Teams ==
Ten UCI Women's WorldTeams and ten UCI Women's Continental Teams took part in the race.

UCI Women's WorldTeams

- Canyon//SRAM
- Ceratizit–WNT Pro Cycling
- FDJ–Suez
- Fenix–Deceuninck
- Lidl–Trek
- Liv AlUla Jayco
- Movistar Team
- Roland
- Team dsm–firmenich PostNL
- Team SD Worx–Protime

UCI Women's Continental Teams

- Arkéa–B&B Hotels Women
- Bepink–Bongioanni
- Cofidis
- Eneicat–CMTeam
- Isolmant–Premac–Vittoria
- Laboral Kutxa–Fundación Euskadi
- Lotto–Dstny Ladies
- St. Michel–Mavic–Auber93
- Team Coop–Repsol
- Winspace

== Route ==
The race used the hilly landscape of the Basque Country, with stage 3 featuring the famed Jaizkibel climb (7.9km at 5.6%) used in the Clásica de San Sebastián.

Stage characteristics and winners
Stage	Date	Course	Distance	Type	Stage winner
1	10 May	Vitoria-Gasteiz to Elgoibar	140 km (87 mi)	Hilly stage	Mischa Bredewold (NED)
2	11 May	Basauri to Basauri	104 km (65 mi)	Hilly stage	Mischa Bredewold (NED)
3	12 May	San Sebastián to San Sebastián	114.9 km (71.4 mi)	Hilly stage	Demi Vollering (NED)
Total			358.9 km (223.0 mi)		

== Stages ==
=== Stage 1 ===
10 May 2024 — Vitoria-Gasteiz to Elgoibar, 140 km (87 mi)

Stage 1 Result
Rank	Rider	Team	Time
1	Mischa Bredewold (NED)	Team SD Worx–Protime	3h 25' 45"
2	Arlenis Sierra (CUB)	Movistar Team	+ 0"
3	Demi Vollering (NED)	Team SD Worx–Protime	+ 0"
4	Josie Nelson (GBR)	Team dsm–firmenich PostNL	+ 0"
5	Fleur Moors (BEL)	Lidl–Trek	+ 0"
6	Olivia Baril (CAN)	Movistar Team	+ 0"
7	Amber Pate (AUS)	Liv AlUla Jayco	+ 0"
8	Thalita de Jong (NED)	Lotto–Dstny Ladies	+ 0"
9	Shirin van Anrooij (NED)	Lidl–Trek	+ 0"
10	Nadia Quagliotto (ITA)	Laboral Kutxa–Fundación Euskadi	+ 0"

General classification after Stage 1
Rank	Rider	Team	Time
1	Mischa Bredewold (NED)	Team SD Worx–Protime	3h 25' 35"
2	Arlenis Sierra (CUB)	Movistar Team	+ 4"
3	Demi Vollering (NED)	Team SD Worx–Protime	+ 6"
4	Olivia Baril (CAN)	Movistar Team	+ 7"
5	Stine Dale (NOR)	Team Coop–Repsol	+ 7"
6	Juliette Labous (FRA)	Team dsm–firmenich PostNL	+ 9"
7	Josie Nelson (GBR)	Team dsm–firmenich PostNL	+ 10"
8	Fleur Moors (BEL)	Lidl–Trek	+ 10"
9	Amber Pate (AUS)	Liv AlUla Jayco	+ 10"
10	Thalita de Jong (NED)	Lotto–Dstny Ladies	+ 10"

=== Stage 2 ===
11 May 2024 — Basauri to Basauri, 104 km (65 mi)

Stage 2 Result
Rank	Rider	Team	Time
1	Mischa Bredewold (NED)	Team SD Worx–Protime	2h 34' 37"
2	Mavi García (ESP)	Liv AlUla Jayco	+ 1"
3	Juliette Labous (FRA)	Team dsm–firmenich PostNL	+ 1"
4	Olivia Baril (CAN)	Movistar Team	+ 4"
5	Demi Vollering (NED)	Team SD Worx–Protime	+ 4"
6	Elise Chabbey (SUI)	Canyon//SRAM	+ 4"
7	Arlenis Sierra (CUB)	Movistar Team	+ 9"
8	Évita Muzic (FRA)	FDJ–Suez	+ 9"
9	Thalita de Jong (NED)	Lotto–Dstny Ladies	+ 9"
10	Ane Santesteban (ESP)	Laboral Kutxa–Fundación Euskadi	+ 9"

General classification after Stage 2
Rank	Rider	Team	Time
1	Mischa Bredewold (NED)	Team SD Worx–Protime	6h 00' 02"
2	Juliette Labous (FRA)	Team dsm–firmenich PostNL	+ 14"
3	Mavi García (ESP)	Liv AlUla Jayco	+ 15"
4	Elise Chabbey (SUI)	Canyon//SRAM	+ 18"
5	Demi Vollering (NED)	Team SD Worx–Protime	+ 19"
6	Olivia Baril (CAN)	Movistar Team	+ 21"
7	Arlenis Sierra (CUB)	Movistar Team	+ 23"
8	Marlen Reusser (SUI)	Team SD Worx–Protime	+ 27"
9	Évita Muzic (FRA)	FDJ–Suez	+ 28"
10	Thalita de Jong (NED)	Lotto–Dstny Ladies	+ 29"

=== Stage 3 ===
12 May 2024 — San Sebastián to San Sebastián, 114.9 km (71.4 mi)

Stage 3 Result
Rank	Rider	Team	Time
1	Demi Vollering (NED)	Team SD Worx–Protime	3h 03' 34"
2	Thalita de Jong (NED)	Lotto–Dstny Ladies	+ 44"
3	Mischa Bredewold (NED)	Team SD Worx–Protime	+ 44"
4	Olivia Baril (CAN)	Movistar Team	+ 44"
5	Elise Chabbey (SUI)	Canyon//SRAM	+ 44"
6	Marlen Reusser (SUI)	Team SD Worx–Protime	+ 44"
7	Juliette Labous (FRA)	Team dsm–firmenich PostNL	+ 44"
8	Cédrine Kerbaol (FRA)	Ceratizit–WNT Pro Cycling	+ 44"
9	Shirin van Anrooij (NED)	Lidl–Trek	+ 44"
10	Ella Wyllie (NZL)	Liv AlUla Jayco	+ 44"

General classification after Stage 3
Rank	Rider	Team	Time
1	Demi Vollering (NED)	Team SD Worx–Protime	9h 03' 42"
2	Mischa Bredewold (NED)	Team SD Worx–Protime	+ 34"
3	Juliette Labous (FRA)	Team dsm–firmenich PostNL	+ 52"
4	Mavi García (ESP)	Liv AlUla Jayco	+ 53"
5	Elise Chabbey (SUI)	Canyon//SRAM	+ 56"
6	Olivia Baril (CAN)	Movistar Team	+ 59"
7	Thalita de Jong (NED)	Lotto–Dstny Ladies	+ 1' 00"
8	Arlenis Sierra (CUB)	Movistar Team	+ 1' 01"
9	Marlen Reusser (SUI)	Team SD Worx–Protime	+ 1' 05"
10	Ella Wyllie (NZL)	Liv AlUla Jayco	+ 1' 05"

== Classification leadership table ==
Classification leadership by stage
Stage	Winner	General classification	Points classification	Mountains classification	Young rider classification	Team classification
1	Mischa Bredewold	Mischa Bredewold	Mischa Bredewold	Valentina Cavallar	Josie Nelson	Team SD Worx–Protime
2	Mischa Bredewold	Mischa Bredewold	Mischa Bredewold	Valentina Cavallar	Shirin van Anrooij	Team SD Worx–Protime
3	Demi Vollering	Demi Vollering	Demi Vollering	Demi Vollering	Ella Wyllie	Team SD Worx–Protime
Final		Demi Vollering	Demi Vollering	Demi Vollering	Ella Wyllie	Team SD Worx–Protime

== Classification standings ==
Legend
Denotes the winner of the general classification	Denotes the winner of the mountains classification
Denotes the winner of the points classification	Denotes the winner of the young rider classification

=== General classification ===
Final general classification (1–10)
Rank	Rider	Team	Time
1	Demi Vollering (NED)	Team SD Worx–Protime	9h 03' 42"
2	Mischa Bredewold (NED)	Team SD Worx–Protime	+ 34"
3	Juliette Labous (FRA)	Team dsm–firmenich PostNL	+ 52"
4	Mavi García (ESP)	Liv AlUla Jayco	+ 53"
5	Elise Chabbey (SUI)	Canyon//SRAM	+ 56"
6	Olivia Baril (CAN)	Movistar Team	+ 59"
7	Thalita de Jong (NED)	Lotto–Dstny Ladies	+ 1' 00"
8	Arlenis Sierra (CUB)	Movistar Team	+ 1' 01"
9	Marlen Reusser (SUI)	Team SD Worx–Protime	+ 1' 05"
10	Ella Wyllie (NZL)	Liv AlUla Jayco	+ 1' 05"

=== Points classification ===
Final points classification (1–10)
Rank	Rider	Team	Points
1	Demi Vollering (NED)	Team SD Worx–Protime	67
2	Mischa Bredewold (NED)	Team SD Worx–Protime	66
3	Olivia Baril (CAN)	Movistar Team	48
4	Elise Chabbey (SUI)	Canyon//SRAM	44
5	Thalita de Jong (NED)	Lotto–Dstny Ladies	39
6	Juliette Labous (FRA)	Team dsm–firmenich PostNL	35
7	Arlenis Sierra (CUB)	Movistar Team	29
8	Mavi García (ESP)	Liv AlUla Jayco	23
9	Marlen Reusser (SUI)	Team SD Worx–Protime	17
10	Évita Muzic (FRA)	FDJ–Suez	17

=== Mountains classification ===
Final mountains classification (1–10)
Rank	Rider	Team	Points
1	Demi Vollering (NED)	Team SD Worx–Protime	14
2	Valentina Cavallar (AUT)	Arkéa–B&B Hotels Women	12
3	Eleonora Ciabocco (ITA)	Team dsm–firmenich PostNL	11
4	Blanka Vas (HUN)	Team SD Worx–Protime	8
5	Urška Žigart (SLO)	Liv AlUla Jayco	7
6	Elise Chabbey (SUI)	Canyon//SRAM	6
7	Amanda Spratt (AUS)	Lidl–Trek	6
8	Juliette Labous (FRA)	Team dsm–firmenich PostNL	4
9	Pauliena Rooijakkers (NED)	Fenix–Deceuninck	4
10	Olivia Baril (CAN)	Movistar Team	3

=== Young rider classification ===
Final young rider classification (1–10)
Rank	Rider	Team	Time
1	Ella Wyllie (NZL)	Liv AlUla Jayco	9h 04' 47"
2	Shirin van Anrooij (NED)	Lidl–Trek	+ 2"
3	Isabella Holmgren (CAN)	Lidl–Trek	+ 2"
4	Marion Bunel (FRA)	St. Michel–Mavic–Auber93	+ 2"
5	Julie Bego (FRA)	Cofidis	+ 2"
6	Elisa Valtulini (ITA)	Bepink–Bongioanni	+ 4' 13"
7	Francesca Barale (ITA)	Team dsm–firmenich PostNL	+ 10' 00"
8	Eleonora Ciabocco (ITA)	Team dsm–firmenich PostNL	+ 10' 15"
9	Magdalene Lind (NOR)	Team Coop–Repsol	+ 13' 07"
10	Josie Nelson (GBR)	Team dsm–firmenich PostNL	+ 13' 46"

=== Teams classification ===
Final team classification (1–10)
Rank	Team	Time
1	(Netherlands) Team SD Worx–Protime	27h 13' 29"
2	(Australia) Liv AlUla Jayco	+ 50"
3	(United States) Lidl–Trek	+ 50"
4	(Spain) Movistar Team	+ 1' 42"
5	(Germany) Ceratizit–WNT Pro Cycling	+ 6' 45"
6	(Belgium) Fenix–Deceuninck	+ 6' 45"
7	(Spain) Laboral Kutxa–Fundación Euskadi	+ 9' 20"
8	(France) St. Michel–Mavic–Auber93	+ 10' 56"
9	(Germany) Canyon//SRAM	+ 11' 57"
10	(France) FDJ–Suez	+ 14' 42"

== See also ==
- 2024 in women's road cycling
