= 2023 Classic Lorient Agglomération =

Cycling race

2023 UCI Women's World Tour, race 23 of 27

Race details
- Dates: 2 September 2023
- Stages: 1
- Distance: 159.6 km (99.2 mi)
- Winning time: 4h 14' 54"

Results
	Winner	Mischa Bredewold (NED)	(SD Worx)
	Second	Marta Lach (POL)	(Ceratizit–WNT Pro Cycling)
	Third	Sofia Bertizzolo (ITA)	(UAE Team ADQ)

The 2023 Classic Lorient Agglomération–Trophée CERATIZIT was the 22nd edition of the Classic Lorient Agglomération, previously known as the GP de Plouay.

It was the 23rd round of the 2023 UCI Women's World Tour and was held on 2 September 2023, in Plouay, France.

== Teams ==
Fifteen UCI Women's WorldTeams and nine UCI Women's Continental Teams made up the twenty-four teams that participated in the race.

UCI Women's WorldTeams

- Canyon//SRAM
- EF Education–Tibco–SVB
- FDJ–Suez
- Fenix–Deceuninck
- Human Powered Health
- Israel Premier Tech Roland
- Lidl–Trek
- Liv Racing TeqFind
- Movistar Team
- SD Worx
- Team dsm–firmenich
- Team Jayco–AlUla
- Team Jumbo–Visma
- UAE Team ADQ
- Uno-X Pro Cycling Team

UCI Women's Continental Teams

- AG Insurance–Soudal–Quick-Step
- Arkéa Pro Cycling Team
- AWOL O'Shea
- Ceratizit–WNT Pro Cycling
- Cofidis
- Laboral Kutxa–Fundación Euskadi
- St. Michel–Mavic–Auber93
- Stade Rochelais Charente-Maritime
- Team Coop–Hitec Products

== Results ==
Result
Rank	Rider	Team	Time
1	Mischa Bredewold (NED)	SD Worx	4h 14' 54"
2	Marta Lach (POL)	Ceratizit–WNT Pro Cycling	+ 0"
3	Sofia Bertizzolo (ITA)	UAE Team ADQ	+ 0"
4	Ruby Roseman-Gannon (AUS)	Team Jayco–AlUla	+ 0"
5	Juliette Labous (FRA)	Team dsm–firmenich	+ 0"
6	Christina Schweinberger (AUT)	Fenix–Deceuninck	+ 0"
7	Karlijn Swinkels (NED)	Team Jumbo–Visma	+ 0"
8	Eglantine Rayer (FRA)	Team dsm–firmenich	+ 0"
9	Claire Steels (GBR)	Israel Premier Tech Roland	+ 0"
10	Elise Chabbey (SUI)	Canyon//SRAM	+ 0"
