= Classic Lorient Agglomération =

Annual women's bicycle race in France

Race details
- Date: late August
- Region: Brittany, France
- Nickname: GP de Plouay
- Discipline: Road bicycle racing
- Competition: UCI Women's World Tour
- Type: Singe-day race
- Web site: www.pco.bzh/4-jours-cic-plouay/grand-prix-lorient-agglomeration.php

History
- First edition: 2002
- Editions: 25 (as of 2026)
- First winner: Regina Schleicher (GER)
- Most wins: Lizzie Deignan (GBR); Mischa Bredewold (NED) (3 wins)
- Most recent: Elisa Balsamo (ITA)

The Classic Lorient Agglomération is an elite professional women's road bicycle race held in Plouay, France.

The race was first organized since 2002 as Grand Prix de Plouay – Bretagne, on the day of the men's race and on the same circuit. The race consists of four 26.9 km laps and two 13.9 km laps, totalling 135.4 km.

The race was part of the UCI Women's Road World Cup until 2015. In 2016, the race became part of the new UCI Women's World Tour. In 2022, the race rebranded as Classic Lorient Agglomération.

== Route ==
The course is known for its high rate of attrition, with riders rapidly dropping out of contention. The first climb starts almost immediately as the race goes over the Côte du Lézot, a one-kilometre climb with an average gradient of 6%. Next is a six-kilometre ascent up to the Chapelle Sainte-Anne des Bois marking the halfway point of the lap. After a flat section, the race addresses the Côte de Ty Marrec, which has a maximum gradient of 10%. The riders will have to tackle this 26.9 kilometre loop 4 times, before entering a last shortened 13.9 kilometre version of the loop, taking the riders over the Côte du Lézot and the Côte de Ty Marrec. The run-in to the finish is slightly downhill. The race is often won by the best sprinter of the climbers.

== Winners ==
Year	Country	Rider	Team
2002	Germany	Regina Schleicher	
2003	Great Britain	Nicole Cooke	
2004	Lithuania	Edita Pučinskaitė	
2005	Italy	Noemi Cantele	
2006	Switzerland	Nicole Brändli	
2007	Italy	Noemi Cantele	
2008	Italy	Fabiana Luperini	
2009	Great Britain	Emma Pooley	Cervélo TestTeam
2010	Great Britain	Emma Pooley	Cervélo TestTeam
2011	Netherlands	Annemiek van Vleuten	Nederland bloeit
2012	Netherlands	Marianne Vos	Rabobank Women Team
2013	Netherlands	Marianne Vos	Rabobank-Liv Giant
2014	Netherlands	Lucinda Brand	Rabobank-Liv Woman Cycling Team
2015	Great Britain	Lizzie Armitstead	Boels–Dolmans
2016	Poland	Eugenia Bujak	BTC City Ljubljana
2017	Great Britain	Lizzie Deignan	Boels–Dolmans
2018	Netherlands	Amy Pieters	Boels–Dolmans
2019	Netherlands	Anna Van der Breggen	Boels–Dolmans
2020	Great Britain	Lizzie Deignan	Trek–Segafredo
2021	Italy	Elisa Longo Borghini	Trek–Segafredo
2022	Spain	Margarita Victoria García	UAE Team ADQ
2023	Netherlands	Mischa Bredewold	SD Worx
2024	Netherlands	Mischa Bredewold	Team SD Worx–Protime
2025	Netherlands	Mischa Bredewold	Team SD Worx–Protime
2026	Italy	Elisa Balsamo	Lidl–Trek

=== Multiple winners ===
Wins	Rider	Editions
3	Lizzie Deignan (GBR)	2015, 2017, 2020
3	Mischa Bredewold (NED)	2023, 2024, 2025
2	Noemi Cantele (ITA)	2005, 2007
2	Emma Pooley (GBR)	2009, 2010
2	Marianne Vos (NED)	2012, 2013

=== Wins per country ===
Wins	Country
9	Netherlands
6	United Kingdom
5	Italy
1	Germany; Lithuania; Poland; Switzerland; Spain
