= 2025 Amstel Gold Race (women's race) =

2025 Amstel Gold Race Ladies Edition
2025 UCI Women's World Tour, race 12 of 27

Race details
- Dates: 20 April 2025
- Stages: 1
- Distance: 157.4 km (97.8 mi)
- Winning time: 4h 03' 03"

Results
	Winner	Mischa Bredewold (NED)	(Team SD Worx–Protime)
	Second	Ellen van Dijk (NED)	(Lidl–Trek)
	Third	Puck Pieterse (NED)	(Fenix–Deceuninck)

The 2025 Amstel Gold Race Ladies Edition was a Dutch road cycling one-day race that took place on 20 April 2025. It was the 11th edition of the Amstel Gold Race for women, and the 12th event of the 2025 UCI Women's World Tour.

The race was won by Dutch rider Mischa Bredewold of Team SD Worx–Protime, after a late attack on the Cauberg climb from the breakaway.

== Teams ==
Twenty-four teams took part in the race. 13 Women's WorldTeams were joined by four UCI Women's ProTeams and seven Women's continental teams.

UCI Women's WorldTeams

- AG Insurance–Soudal
- Canyon//SRAM Zondacrypto
- Ceratizit Pro Cycling
- FDJ–Suez
- Fenix–Deceuninck
- Lidl–Trek
- Liv AlUla Jayco
- Movistar Team
- Team Picnic–PostNL
- Team SD Worx–Protime
- UAE Team ADQ
- Uno-X Mobility
- Visma–Lease a Bike

UCI Women's ProTeams

- Cofidis
- EF Education–Oatly
- VolkerWessels Cycling Team
- Winspace Orange Seal

UCI Women's Continental Teams

- Aromitalia 3T Vaiano
- BePink–Imatra–Bongioanni
- Cynisca Cycling
- DAS–Hutchinson
- DD Group Pro Cycling Team
- Eneicat–CMTeam
- Team Coop–Repsol

== Result ==
Result
Rank	Rider	Team	Time
1	Mischa Bredewold (NED)	Team SD Worx–Protime	4h 03' 03"
2	Ellen van Dijk (NED)	Lidl–Trek	+ 7"
3	Puck Pieterse (NED)	Fenix–Deceuninck	+ 7"
4	Juliette Labous (FRA)	FDJ–Suez	+ 7"
5	Silvia Persico (ITA)	UAE Team ADQ	+ 9"
6	Lorena Wiebes (NED)	Team SD Worx–Protime	+ 1' 26"
7	Alison Jackson (CAN)	EF Education–Oatly	+ 1' 26"
8	Anna Henderson (GBR)	Visma–Lease a Bike	+ 1' 26"
9	Quinty Ton (NED)	Liv AlUla Jayco	+ 1' 26"
10	Mara Roldan (CAN)	Team Picnic–PostNL	+ 1' 26"
