= Olivia Baril =

Canadian racing cyclist (born 1997)

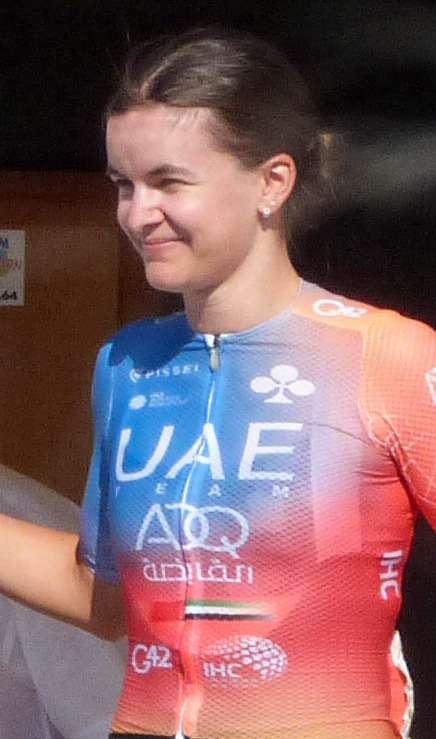
- Baril in 2023

Personal information
- Born: 10 October 1997 (age 29) Rouyn-Noranda, Canada
- Height: 1.65 m (5 ft 5 in)

Cycling career
- Sport: Cycling
- Current team: Movistar Team
- Discipline: Road
- Role: Rider

Amateur team
- 2018–2019: Macogep–Argon18–Girondins

Professional teams
- 2020: Macogep Tornatech Girondins de Bordeaux
- 2021: Massi–Tactic
- 2022: Valcar–Travel & Service
- 2023: UAE Team ADQ
- 2024–: Movistar Team

Olivia Baril (born 10 October 1997) is a Canadian professional racing cyclist, who currently rides for UCI Women's WorldTeam Movistar Team.

Baril had her first professional victory in 2022 at the Spanish race Gran Premio Ciudad de Eibar, winning the sprint ahead of Ane Santesteban. Baril also competed at the 2022 Tour de France Femmes.

== Major results ==
2019
5th White Spot / Delta Road Race
2020
6th Overall Dubai Women's Tour
2021
5th Road race, National Road Championships
2022
1st Gran Premio Ciudad de Eibar
3rd Memorial Monica Bandini
7th Overall Festival Elsy Jacobs
9th Overall Tour de Suisse Women

1st Young rider classification

2023
1st Gran Premio Ciudad de Eibar
National Road Championships

2nd Road race
2nd Time trial

4th Overall Itzulia Women
5th Overall Setmana Ciclista Valenciana
2024
National Road Championships

1st Road race
2nd Time trial

1st Women Cycling Pro Costa De Almería
4th Vuelta CV Feminas
4th Trofeo Binissalem-Andratx
6th Overall Itzulia Women
7th Overall Vuelta Extremadura Féminas

1st Stage 1

7th Trofeo Alfredo Binda-Comune di Cittiglio
