= Mischa Bredewold =

Dutch pro cyclist

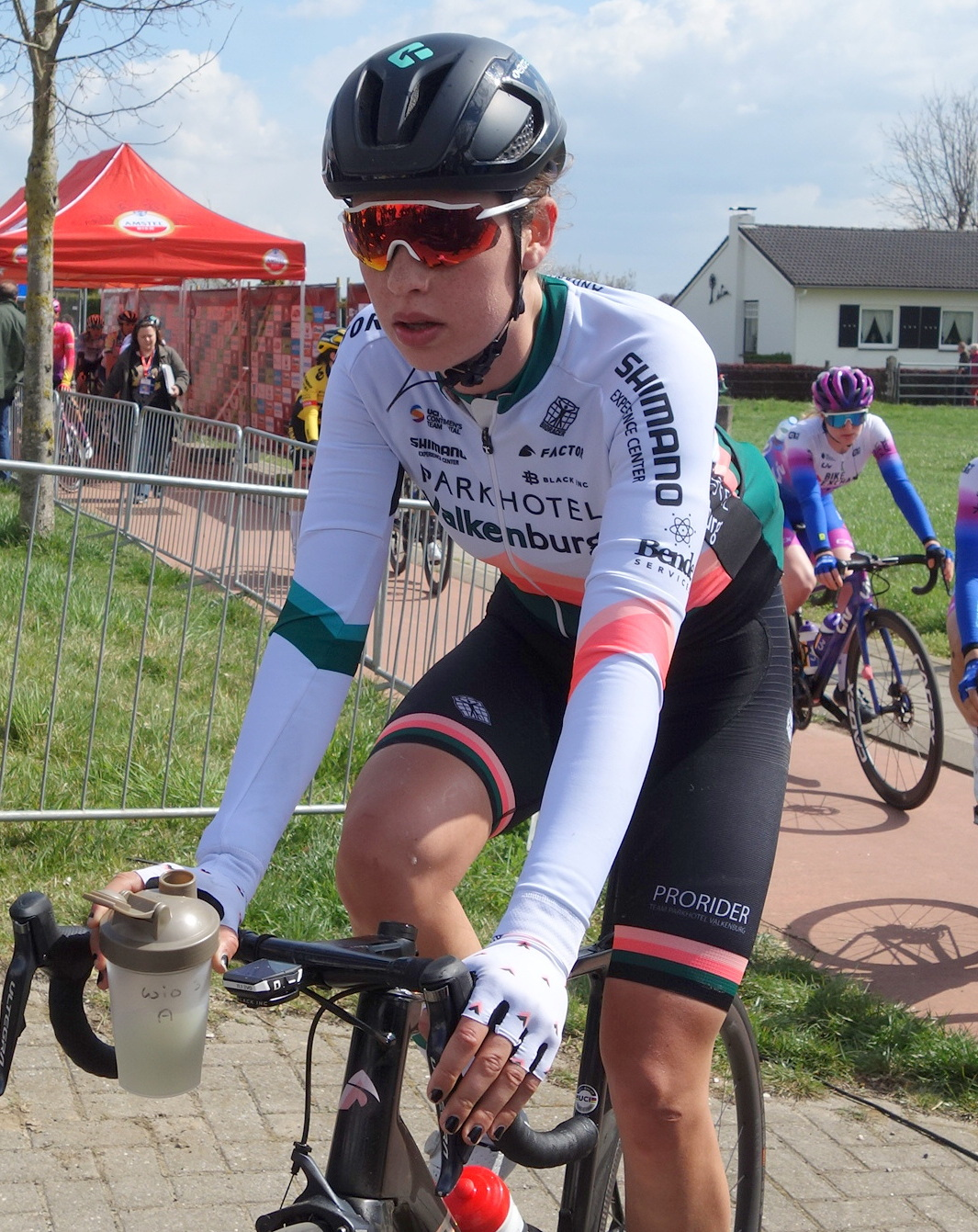
- Bredewold at the 2022 Amstel Gold Race

Personal information
- Full name: Mischa Bredewold
- Born: 20 June 2000 (age 26) Amersfoort, Netherlands
- Height: 1.81 m (5 ft 11 in)

Cycling career
- Sport: Cycling
- Current team: Team SD Worx–Protime
- Discipline: Road
- Role: Rider

Professional teams
- 2021–2023: Parkhotel Valkenburg
- 2023–: SD Worx

Major wins
- Major Tours La Vuelta Femenina 1 individual stage (2026) Stage races Itzulia Women (2026) One-day races and Classics European Road Race Championships (2023) Amstel Gold Race (2025) Classic Lorient Agglomération (2023, 2024, 2025)
Medal record
Women's road bicycle racing
Representing the Netherlands
European Championships
Gold medal – first place	2023 Drenthe	Road race
Bronze medal – third place	2025 Guilherand-Granges	Time trial

Mischa Bredewold (born 20 June 2000) is a Dutch professional racing cyclist, who currently rides for UCI Women's World Tour Team Team SD Worx–Protime.

Starting racing in 2017 as a junior, the early part of her career was heavily disrupted when she was hit by a truck while training for the Dutch junior team prior to the 2018 UCI Road World Championships. Despite three broken vertebrae, six broken ribs, a broken pelvis, and a serious brain injury – Bredewold made a full recovery, and joined the professional peloton in 2020 with NXTG Racing.

Signing for Parkhotel Valkenburg for the 2021 season, her best result of the year was the young riders classification at the Baloise Ladies Tour, with three other top 5 finishes in the young riders classifications at other races.

In 2022, she finished 3rd in the under 23 category at the Dutch National Time Trial Championships, as well as 3rd in the under 23 category European Road Championships Mixed Relay Team Time Trial. In her first Grand Tour, Bredewold came second in the young riders classification at the Tour de France Femmes, five minutes behind Shirin van Anrooij. She finished the race 21st overall. Bredewold then won the À travers les Hauts-de-France later that year.

In September 2022, it was announced that both Bredewold and Femke Markus would join SD Worx from 2023, signing a two-year deal. In 2024, Bredewold won her first two UCI Women's World Tour stages at Itzulia Women, finishing 2nd overall behind teammate Demi Vollering. In June, it was announced that her contract with Team SD Worx–Protime had been extended to 2027. In 2025, Bredewold won the Amstel Gold Race from a breakaway.

== Major results ==
2018
7th Overall Omloop van Borsele Juniors
7th Overall Healthy Ageing Tour Junior
2021
4th Overall Baloise Ladies Tour

1st Young rider classification

10th Overall Lotto Belgium Tour
2022
1st À travers les Hauts-de-France
2nd Overall Tour de la Semois

1st Points classification
1st Young rider classification
1st Stage 1

3rd Team relay, UEC European Under-23 Road Championships
3rd Time trial, National Under-23 Road Championships
3rd Leiedal Koerse
6th Overall Holland Ladies Tour

1st Young rider classification
1st Stage 6

6th Overall Bretagne Ladies Tour
2023
1st Road race, UEC European Road Championships
1st Classic Lorient Agglomération
1st Volta Limburg Classic
3rd Overall Thüringen Ladies Tour

1st Stages 1 (TTT) & 2

9th Dwars door het Hageland
2024
1st Classic Lorient Agglomération
2nd Overall Itzulia Women

1st Stages 1 & 2

2nd Road race, National Road Championships
2nd Overall Thüringen Ladies Tour

1st Stage 5 (ITT)

2nd Omloop van het Hageland
4th Dwars door het Hageland
2025
1st Amstel Gold Race
1st Classic Lorient Agglomération
1st Stage 2 Setmana Ciclista Valenciana
2nd Overall Itzulia Women

1st Points classification
1st Stages 1 & 2

3rd Time Trial, UEC European Road Championships
5th Dwars door Vlaanderen
2026
1st Overall Itzulia Women

1st Points classification
1st Stage 1

1st Stage 5 La Vuelta Femenina
5th Overall Vuelta a Burgos Feminas

1st Stage 3

9th Tour of Flanders

=== General classification results timeline ===
Major Tour results timeline
Stage race	2021	2022	2023	2024	2025	2026
La Vuelta Femenina (Note: Known as the Challenge by La Vuelta from 2020 to 2022)	—	—	—	40	33	43
Giro d'Italia Femminile	—	—	—	—	—	—
Tour de France Femmes	DNE	21	63	54	83	
Stage race results timeline
Stage race	2021	2022	2023	2024	2025	2026
The Women's Tour	24	—	—	—	—	
Holland Ladies Tour	11	6	22	—	—	
Itzulia Women	DNE	—	33	2	2	1
Tour of Scandinavia (Note: Known as the Ladies Tour of Norway until 2021)	25	21	—	NH		
Tour de Romandie Féminin	DNE	62	41	—	41	
Tour de Suisse	—	—	—	47	27	

=== Classics results timeline ===
Monuments results timeline
Monument	2021	2022	2023	2024	2026	2026
Tour of Flanders	25	23	—	24	13	9
Paris–Roubaix	OTL	58	—	—	—	—
Liège–Bastogne–Liège	—	59	45	67	46	35
Classics results timeline
Classic	2021	2022	2023	2024	2025	2026
Omloop Het Nieuwsblad	36	31	—	—	39	54
Strade Bianche	—	—	35	52	15	55
Trofeo Alfredo Binda	—	—	45	—	—	DNF
Gent–Wevelgem	88	40	—	—	78	—
Dwars door Vlaanderen	—	—	12	19	5	16
Amstel Gold Race	56	21	39	84	1	14
La Flèche Wallonne	—	—	36	—	—	71
Classic Brugge–De Panne	33	—	—	—	—	—
Ronde van Drenthe	16	40	38	36	Not held	
Open de Suède Vårgårda	NH	19	Not held			
Classic Lorient Agglomération	—	—	1	1	1	
