= 2025 Strade Bianche Donne =

Bicycle race

2025 UCI Women's World Tour, race 5 of 27

Race details
- Dates: 8 March 2025
- Stages: 1
- Distance: 136 km (85 mi)
- Winning time: 3h 49' 04"

Results
	Winner	Demi Vollering (NED)	(FDJ–Suez)
	Second	Anna van der Breggen (NED)	(Team SD Worx–Protime)
	Third	Pauline Ferrand-Prévot (FRA)	(Visma–Lease a Bike)

The 2025 Strade Bianche Donne was a road cycling one-day race that took place on 8 March 2025 in Tuscany, Italy. It was the 11th edition of the Strade Bianche Donne and the fifth event of the 2025 UCI Women's World Tour.

The race was won by Dutch rider Demi Vollering of FDJ–Suez for the second time, after attacking on the final climb into Siena.

== Route ==
The race started and finished in Siena, Italy. Taking place over 136 kilometres (85 mi), the course includes 50.3 km of 'strade bianche' gravel roads spread over thirteen sectors, with one new sector starting in Serravalle. Although taking place over a similar distance to previous editions of the race, the Serravalle sector adds an additional 10 km of 'strade bianche' gravel roads compared to the 2024 edition of the race. The race finished on the Piazza del Campo, after a steep climb up Via Santa Caterina with a maximum gradient of 16%.

== Teams ==
Twenty-four teams participated in the race, including all fifteen UCI Women's WorldTeams, four UCI Women's ProTeams, and five UCI Women's Continental Teams.

UCI Women's WorldTeams

- AG Insurance–Soudal
- Canyon//SRAM zondacrypto
- Ceratizit Pro Cycling
- FDJ–Suez
- Fenix–Deceuninck
- Human Powered Health
- Lidl–Trek
- Liv AlUla Jayco
- Movistar Team
- Roland
- Team Picnic–PostNL
- Team SD Worx–Protime
- UAE Team ADQ
- Uno-X Mobility
- Visma–Lease a Bike

UCI Women's ProTeams

- Cofidis
- EF Education–Oatly
- Laboral Kutxa–Fundación Euskadi
- VolkerWessels Cycling Team

UCI Women's Continental Teams

- Aromitalia 3T Vaiano
- BePink–Imatra–Bongioanni
- Isolmant–Premac–Vittoria
- Team Mendelspeck E-Work
- Top Girls Fassa Bortolo

== Result ==
Result
Rank	Rider	Team	Time
1	Demi Vollering (NED)	FDJ–Suez	3h 49' 04"
2	Anna van der Breggen (NED)	Team SD Worx–Protime	+ 18"
3	Pauline Ferrand-Prévot (FRA)	Visma–Lease a Bike	+ 1' 42"
4	Juliette Labous (FRA)	FDJ–Suez	+ 1' 42"
5	Mavi García (ESP)	Liv AlUla Jayco	+ 1' 47"
6	Yara Kastelijn (NED)	Fenix–Deceuninck	+ 1' 48"
7	Puck Pieterse (NED)	Fenix–Deceuninck	+ 1' 49"
8	Niamh Fisher-Black (NZL)	Lidl–Trek	+ 1' 54"
9	Noemi Rüegg (SUI)	EF Education–Oatly	+ 1' 55"
10	Silke Smulders (NED)	Liv AlUla Jayco	+ 1' 59"
