= Gumiel de Mercado =

- Municipality and town
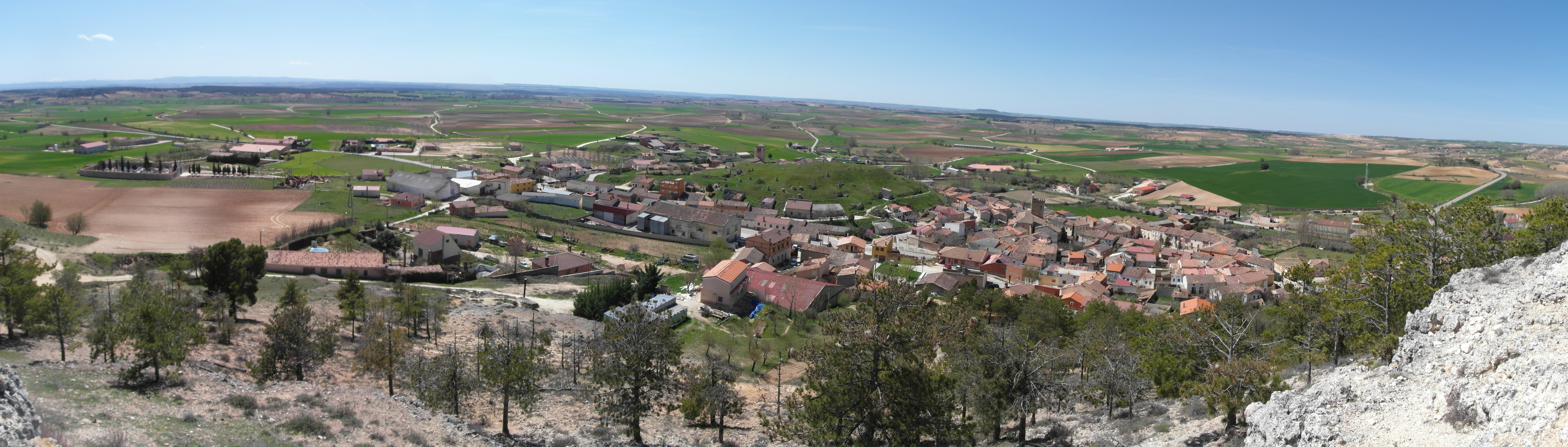
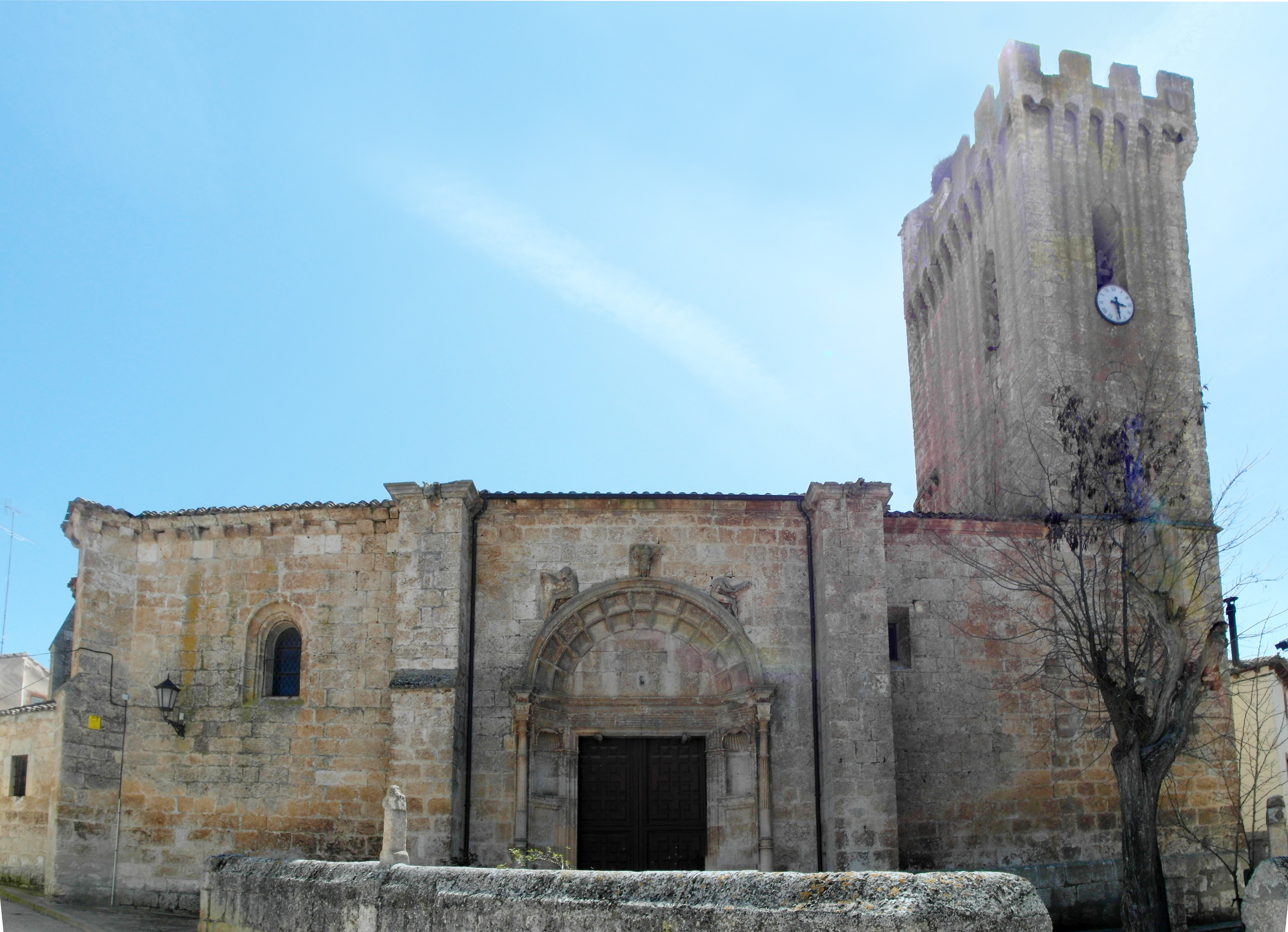
- Panoramic view of Gumiel de Mercado, 2013

- Location within Castile and León Location within Spain
- Coordinates: 41°46′N 3°48′W
- Country: Spain
- Autonomous community: Castile and León
- Province: Burgos
- Comarca: Ribera del Duero

Area
  - Total: 57.71 km^{2} (22.28 sq mi)
- Elevation: 829 m (2,720 ft)

Population (2025-01-01)
  - Total: 376
  - Density: 6.52/km^{2} (16.9/sq mi)
- Time zone: UTC+1 (CET)
  - Summer (DST): UTC+2 (CEST)
- Postal code: 09443
- Website: www.gumieldemercado.es

Gumiel de Mercado is a municipality located in the province of Burgos, Castile and León, Spain. At the 2004 census (INE) the municipality had a population of 386 inhabitants. Located 72 km from the capital and 14 km from Aranda de Duero, it has an area of 57.71 km² and is located 829 m above sea level.
