= Mieke Docx =

Belgian cyclist

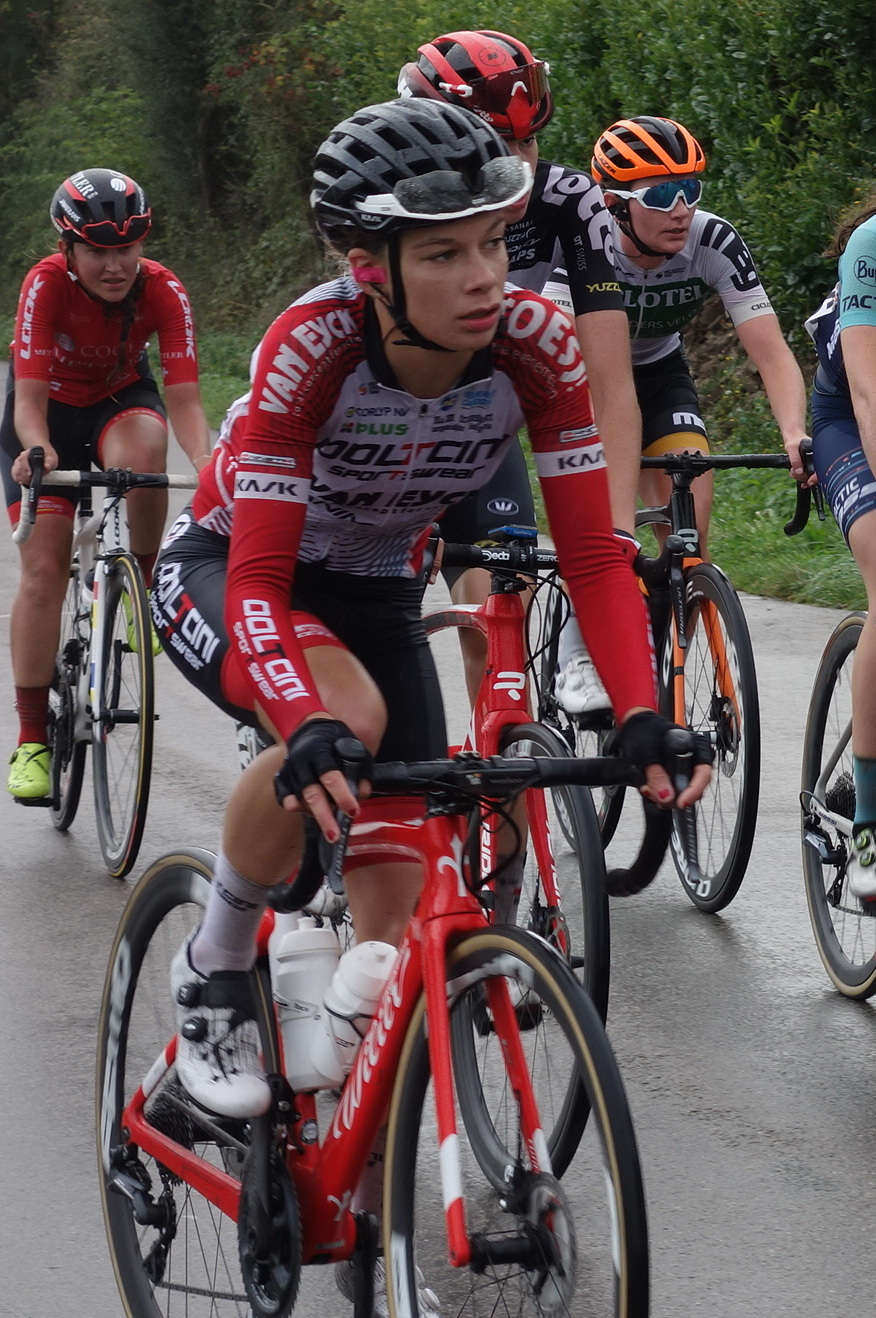
- Docx in 2020

Personal information
- Full name: Mieke Docx
- Born: 8 June 1996 (age 30)

Cycling career
- Sport: Cycling
- Current team: Doltcini–Van Eyck–Proximus
- Discipline: Road
- Role: Rider

Professional team
- 2017–: Lares–Waowdeals

Mieke Docx (born 8 June 1996) is a Belgian professional racing cyclist, who currently rides for UCI Women's Continental Team Doltcini–Van Eyck–Proximus.
