= Anne Knijnenburg =

Dutch cyclist and runner

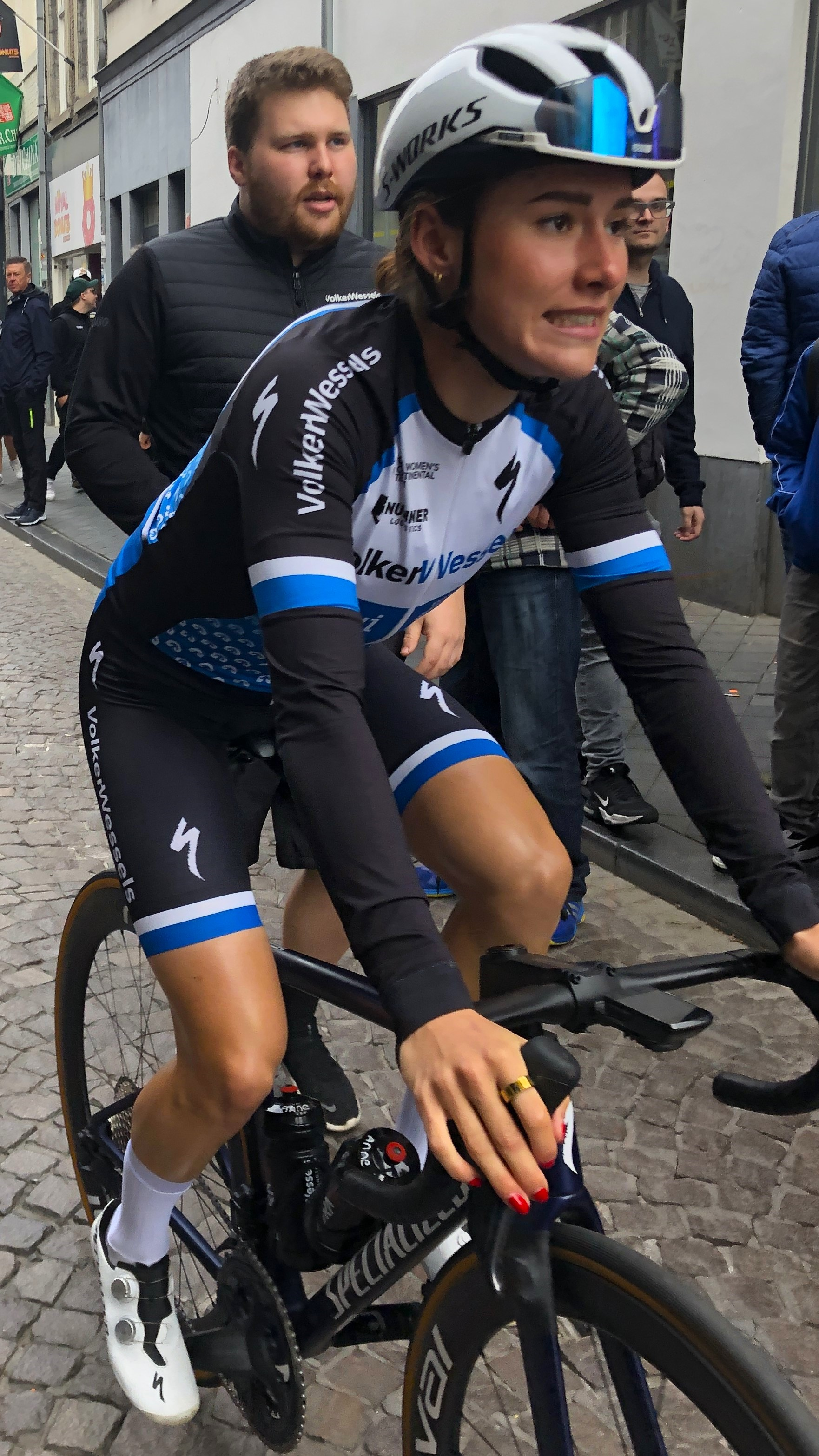
- Knijnenburg in 2024

Personal information
- Born: 11 March 2002 (age 24) Oss, Netherlands

Cycling career
- Sport: Cycling
- Current team: VolkerWessels Women Cyclingteam
- Disciplines: Road; Cyclo-cross
- Role: Rider

Amateur team
- 2023: WV Schijndel

Professional team
- 2023–: Parkhotel Valkenburg

Anne Knijnenburg (born 11 March 2002) is a Dutch cyclist and former middle-distance runner, who currently rides for UCI Women's ProTeam VolkerWessels Women Cyclingteam.

As a runner, Knijnenburg won the 1500 metres at the 2021 national indoor championships and the 800 metres at the 2022 national outdoor championships. She holds personal bests of 4:26.49 in the 1500 metres and 2:05.39 in the 800 metres.

In 2023, she won the national cross duathlon championships.

After suffering from running injuries, Knijnenburg took up cycling in 2023, initially joining club team WV Schijndel before signing with Parkhotel Valkenburg that August. In 2024, she won her first elite race in Hamme at the Cyclis Classic, before winning the mountains classification at both the Tour of Chongming Island and the Giro della Toscana Int. Femminile – Memorial Michela Fanini.

The following season, she won the overall title of the Tour of Chongming Island, an event on the UCI Women's World Tour.

== Major results ==
=== Cycling ===
2023
9th Overall Gracia–Orlová
9th La Choralis Fourmies Féminine
2024
1st Cyclis Classic
7th Tour of Guangxi
8th Overall Giro della Toscana Int. Femminile – Memorial Michela Fanini

1st Mountains classification

9th Overall Tour of Chongming Island

1st Mountains classification

2025
1st Overall Tour of Chongming Island

1st Mountains classification

2nd Région Pays de la Loire Tour
3rd Mirabelle Classic
4th Trofeo Oro in Euro
2026
UCI Gravel World Series

2nd Turnhout

8th Vuelta CV Feminas
9th Overall Giro della Toscana Int. Femminile – Memorial Michela Fanini
