= Elisa Balsamo =

Elisa Balsamo can refer to:

- Elisa Balsamo (cyclist) (born 1998), Italian road and track cyclist
- Elisa Balsamo (tennis) (born 1983), Italian tennis player
