= Nicole Steinmetz =

German-American biomedical engineer

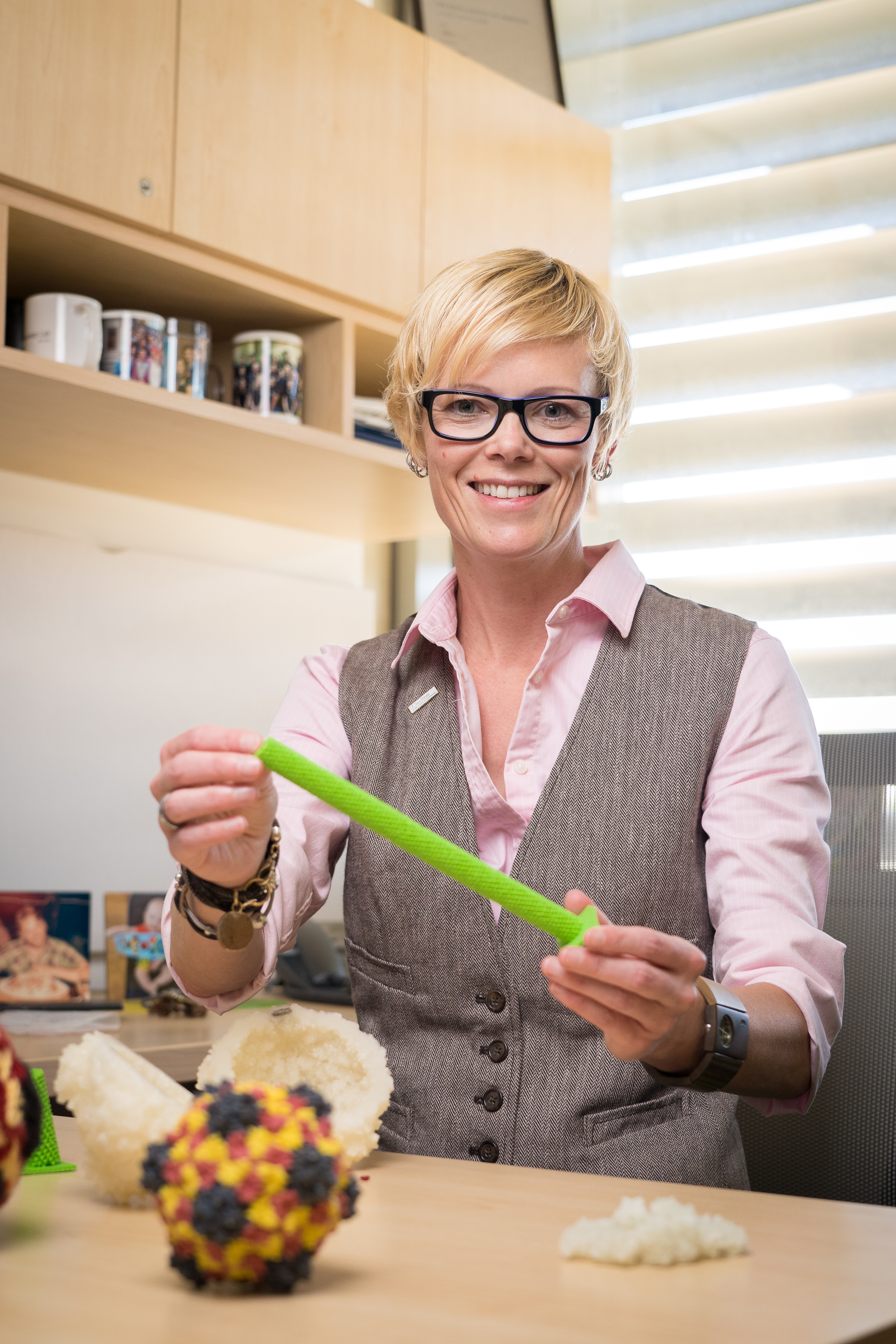
- Born: Germany
- Spouse: Jon Pokorski

Academic background
- Education: BSc, biology, Ruhr University Bochum; MSc, RWTH Aachen University; University of East Anglia (PhD)

Academic work
- Institutions: University of California, San Diego; Case Western Reserve University School of Medicine
- Website: steinmetzlab.com

Nicole F. Steinmetz is a German–American biomedical engineer. She is a Full Professor in Biomaterials at the University of California, San Diego and the Founding Director of the Center for the Aiiso Yufeng Li Family Department of Chemical and Nano Engineering. Her research earned her Fellowship nominations from the American Institute for Medical and Biological Engineering, Biomedical Engineering Society, and National Academy of Inventors. Steinmetz uses various plant viruses to assist with drug delivery, molecular imaging, and vaccines.

== Early life and education ==
Steinmetz was born and raised in Germany. She competed with the German national figure skating and rollerblading team at the German National Championships and European Championships. Steinmetz completed her Bachelor of Science degree at Ruhr University Bochum and her Master of Science degree at RWTH Aachen University. She then moved to Norwich, England for her PhD at the University of East Anglia and became a Marie Curie Early Stage Training Fellow at the John Innes Centre from 2004 to 2007.

== Career ==
Following her Fellowship at the John Innes Centre, Steinmetz moved to North America where she trained at the Scripps Research Institute as an NIH K99/R00 awardee and AHA post-doctoral fellow from 2007 until 2010. While at Scripps, she trained under M.G. Finn and analyzed the potential of viral nanoparticles drug delivery and medical diagnostics. Upon completing her second fellowship, Steinmetz joined the faculty of Case Western Reserve University as an assistant professor. In this role, she founded the Steinmetz Lab to advance medicine and materials through molecular engineering of bio-inspired nanotechnologies. In 2014, Steinmetz received two grants to manipulate plant viruses in order for them to deliver vaccines throughout the body. The following year, she was the recipient of the National Science Foundation CAREER Award (NSF) to continue her research into manipulating plant viruses. The NSF grant specifically funded her research into creating tiny sensors capable of detecting insecticides in Lake Erie or determining subtypes of human cancers. As a result of the Western African Ebola virus epidemic, she oversaw plans to reduce the risk of the virus going undetected through a bio-inspired nanomanufacturing protocol. Steinmetz's efforts were recognised in 2017 with an election to the American Institute for Medical and Biological Engineering College of Fellows. She shortly thereafter joined the faculty at the University of California, San Diego (UCSD) and was elected a Fellow of the International Association for Advanced Materials.

As a professor at UCSD, Steinmetz became the founding director of the Center for Nano-ImmunoEngineering and co-director of the Center for Engineering in Cancer. She also co-founded a biotechnology startup, called Mosaic ImmunoEngineering Inc, with Steven Fiering. During the COVID-19 pandemic, the pair began developing fridge-free COVID-19 vaccines for easier distribution. They also created and licensed the cowpea mosaic virus nanotechnology as a cancer immunotherapy. As a result of her research, Steinmetz was elected a Fellow of the National Academy of Inventors and Biomedical Engineering Society in 2022.
