= Tour Féminin International des Pyrénées =

French one-day road cycling race

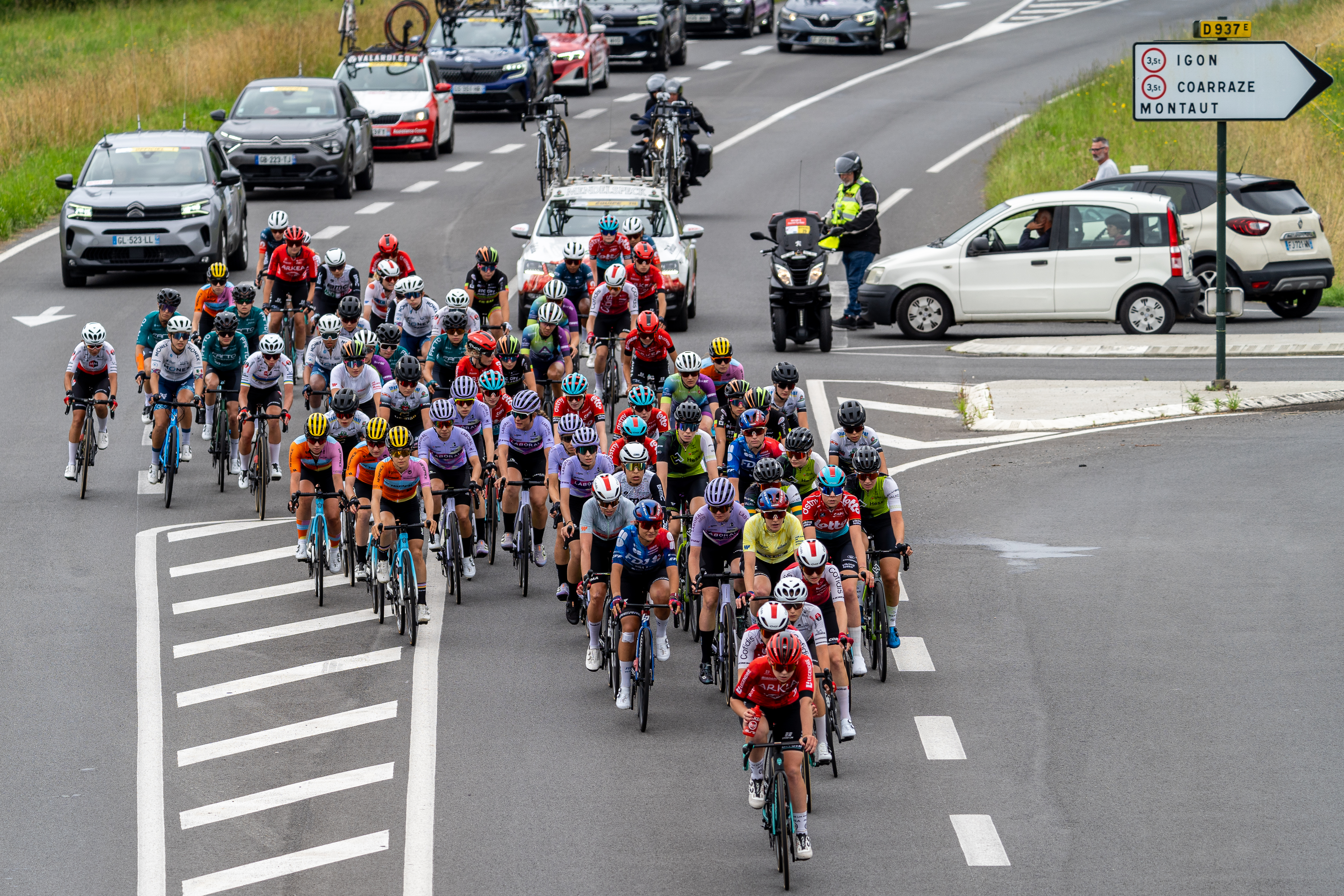
- Stage 2 of the 2024 edition

Race details
- Date: June
- Region: Pyrénées
- Discipline: Road
- Competition: UCI Women's ProSeries
- Type: Stage race
- Web site: www.cic-tfip.com

History
- First edition: 2022
- Editions: 5 (as of 2026)
- First winner: Kristabel Doebel-Hickok (USA)
- Most wins: Usoa Ostolaza (ESP) (2 wins)
- Most recent: Paula Blasi (ESP)

The Tour Féminin International des Pyrénées is an elite women's professional multi-day road bicycle race held annually in the Pyrénées mountains in France. The event was first held in 2022. Previously rated by the UCI as a 2.1 category race, the race joined the UCI ProSeries from 2026 onwards.

== Past winners ==
Year	Country	Rider	Team
2022	United States	Kristabel Doebel-Hickok	EF Education–Tibco–SVB
2023	Italy	Marta Cavalli	Arkéa–Samsic
2024	Spain	Usoa Ostolaza	Laboral Kutxa–Fundación Euskadi
2025	Spain	Usoa Ostolaza	Laboral Kutxa–Fundación Euskadi
2026	Spain	Paula Blasi	UAE Team ADQ
