= Li Ning Star Ladies =

Chinese cycling team

Team information
- UCI code: LNS (2022–)
- Registered: China
- Founded: 2022
- Discipline: Road
- Status: UCI Women's Continental Team (2022–)

Team name history
- 2022–: Li Ning Star Ladies

Li Ning Star Ladies is a Chinese women's road cycling team that was founded in 2022.

== Roster ==
As of April 1, 2022

Rider	Date of birth
Han Deng (CHN)	23 June 2001 (age 25)
Kaiyan Jiao (CHN)	8 January 2002 (age 24)
Qiao Kang (CHN)	23 April 2000 (age 26)
Mingyue Sun (CHN)	12 December 2001 (age 24)
Yanan Sun (CHN)	29 November 2000 (age 25)
Zehui Tan (CHN)	15 June 1999 (age 27)
Fangfang Zhao (CHN)	21 October 2001 (age 24)
Xueyi Zhou (CHN)	17 November 2002 (age 23)
