= Yurani Blanco =

Spanish cyclist

Personal information
- Full name: Yurani Blanco Calbet
- Born: 3 February 1998 (age 28)

Cycling career
- Sport: Cycling
- Current team: Human Powered Health
- Discipline: Road
- Role: Rider

Professional teams
- 2018–2019: Sopela Women's Team
- 2020–2021: Bizkaia–Durango
- 2022–2024: Laboral Kutxa–Fundación Euskadi
- 2025–: Human Powered Health

Yurani Blanco Calbet (born 3 February 1998) is a Spanish professional racing cyclist, who currently rides for UCI Women's WorldTeam Human Powered Health. In 2024, Blanco took her first major win at the Gran Premio Ciudad de Eibar.

== Major results ==
2015
2nd Road race, National Junior Road Championships
2019
1st Time trial, National Under-23 Road Championships
2022
3rd Road race, National Road Championships
9th Gran Premio Ciudad de Eibar
2023
5th Overall Vuelta Extremadura Féminas
5th ReVolta
8th Women Cycling Pro Costa De Almería
9th Gran Premio Ciudad de Eibar
9th Clásica de Almería
2024
1st Gran Premio Ciudad de Eibar
2nd Road race, National Road Championships
3rd Overall Tour Féminin International des Pyrénées
10th Clasica Femenina Navarra
Combativity award Stage 1 Tour de France
