= Usoa Ostolaza =

Spanish cyclist

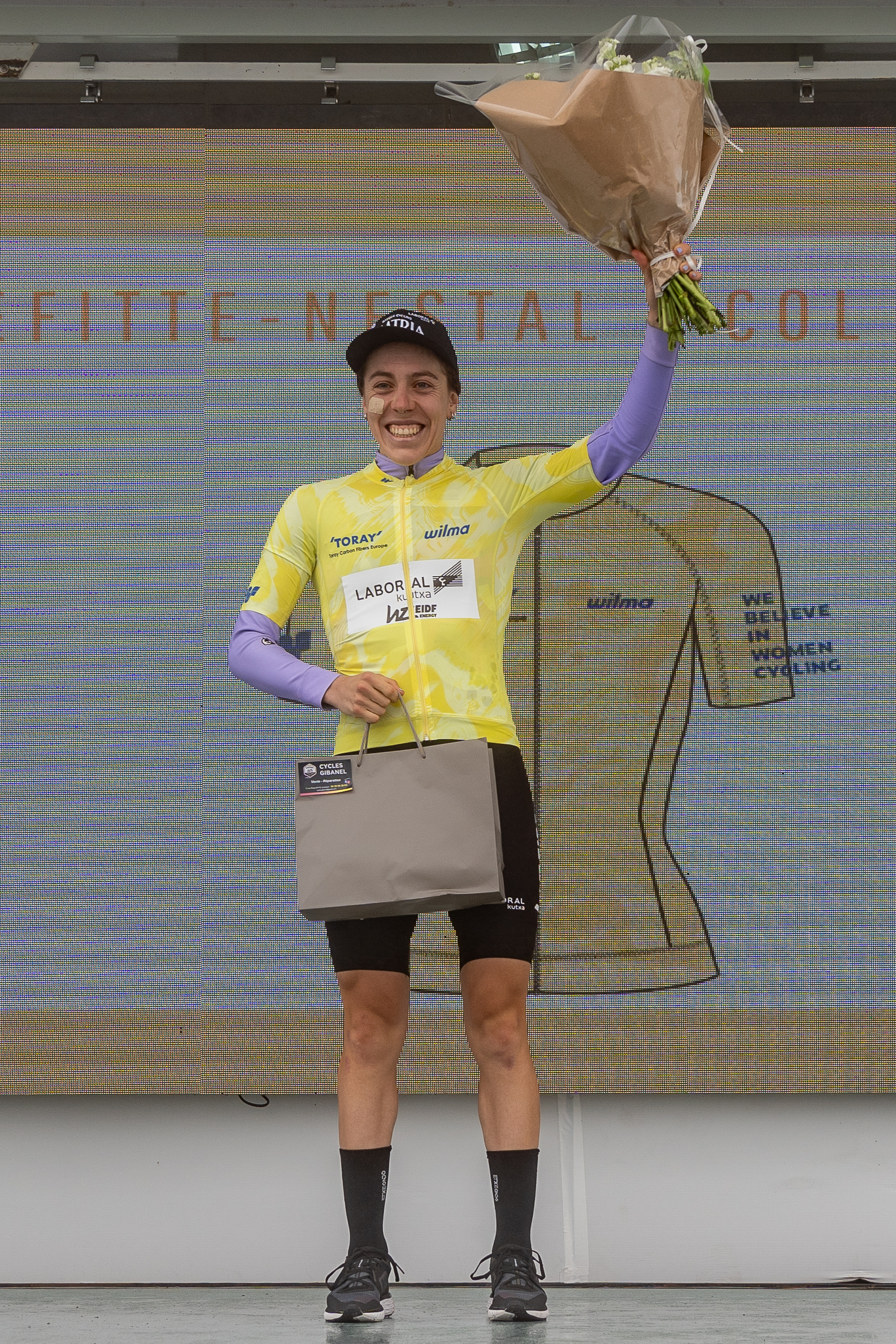
- Ostolaza in 2024

Personal information
- Full name: Usoa Ostolaza Zabala
- Born: 25 February 1998 (age 28) Zarautz, Basque Country, Spain

Cycling career
- Sport: Cycling
- Current team: Laboral Kutxa–Fundación Euskadi
- Discipline: Road
- Role: Rider

Professional team
- 2021–: Laboral Kutxa–Fundación Euskadi

Major wins
- One-day races and Classics National Road Race Championships (2024)

Usoa Ostolaza Zabala (born 25 February 1998) is a Spanish racing cyclist, who currently rides for UCI Women's Continental Team Laboral Kutxa–Fundación Euskadi. She won the Spanish National Road Race Championships in 2024.

== Major results ==
2023
6th Grand Prix de Wallonie
10th Gran Premio Ciudad de Eibar
2024
1st Road race, National Road Championships
1st Overall Tour Féminin International des Pyrénées

1st Points classification
1st Stage 2

2nd Gran Premio Ciudad de Eibar
5th Overall Vuelta Ciclista Andalucía Elite Women
2025
1st Overall Tour Féminin International des Pyrénées

1st Stage 2

2026
3rd Overall Vuelta a Burgos Feminas
4th Overall La Vuelta Femenina
7th Overall Itzulia Women
