= Caroline Andersson =

Swedish cyclist (born 2001)

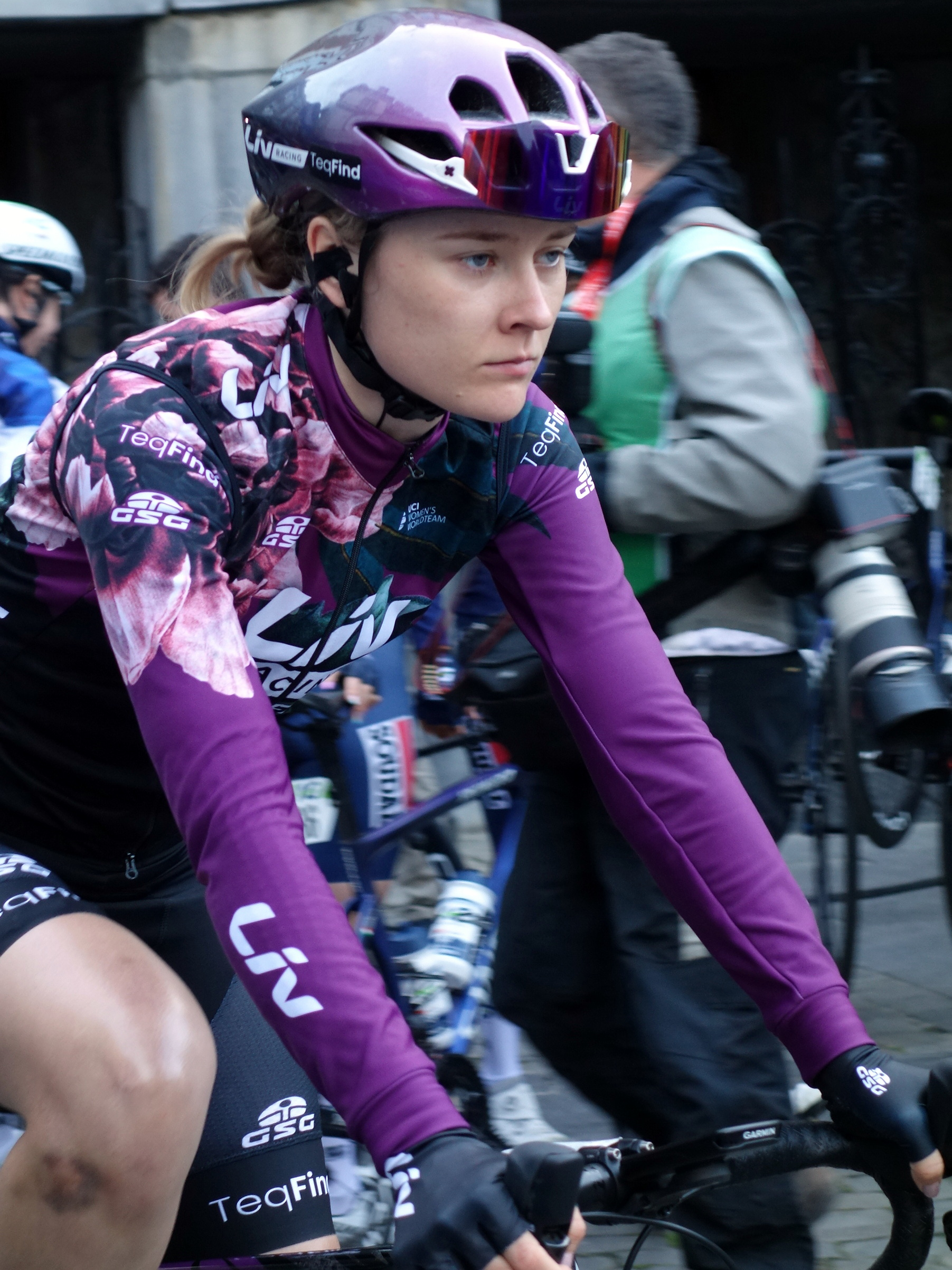
- Andersson in 2023

Personal information
- Born: 29 July 2001 (age 25) Oskarström, Sweden

Cycling career
- Sport: Cycling
- Current team: Liv AlUla Jayco
- Disciplines: Road; Cyclo-cross
- Role: Rider

Amateur team
- 2017: Team Rytger

Professional teams
- 2021–2022: Team Hitec Products
- 2023–: Team Jayco–AlUla

Caroline Andersson (born 29 July 2001) is a Swedish professional racing cyclist, who currently rides for UCI Women's WorldTour Team Liv AlUla Jayco. She finished 14th in the road race at the 2024 Summer Olympics.

== Major results ==
=== Road ===
2020
8th Road race, National Road Championships
2022
6th Road race, National Road Championships
2023
7th Road race, National Road Championships
2024
8th Road race, National Road Championships
2025
4th Clásica de Almería

=== Cyclo-cross ===
2023–2024
1st National Cyclo-cross Championships
