= Laboral Kutxa–Fundación Euskadi =

Spanish cycling team

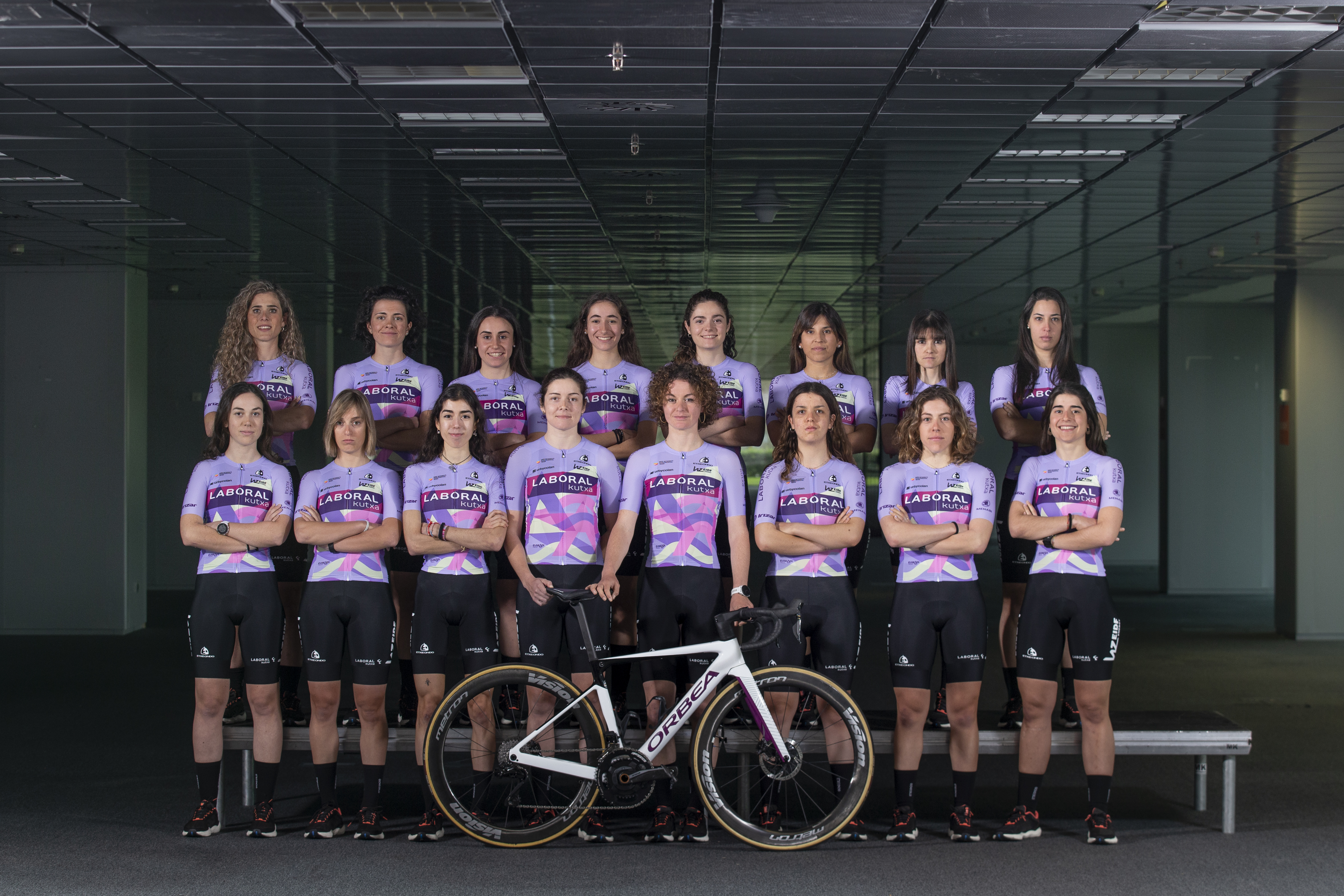

Team information
- UCI code: LKF (2019–present)
- Registered: Belgium
- Founded: 2019
- Discipline: Road
- Status: National Team (2019–2020); UCI Women's Continental Team (2021–2024); UCI Women's ProTeam (2025–present)
- Bicycles: Orbea (2019–present)

Team name history
- 2019–present: Laboral Kutxa–Fundación Euskadi

Laboral Kutxa–Fundación Euskadi is a Spanish women's road bicycle racing team, established in 2019, which participates in elite women's races.

The team is sponsored by Basque credit union Laboral Kutxa and Basque non-profit Fundación Euskadi, which encourages cycling in the Basque Country.

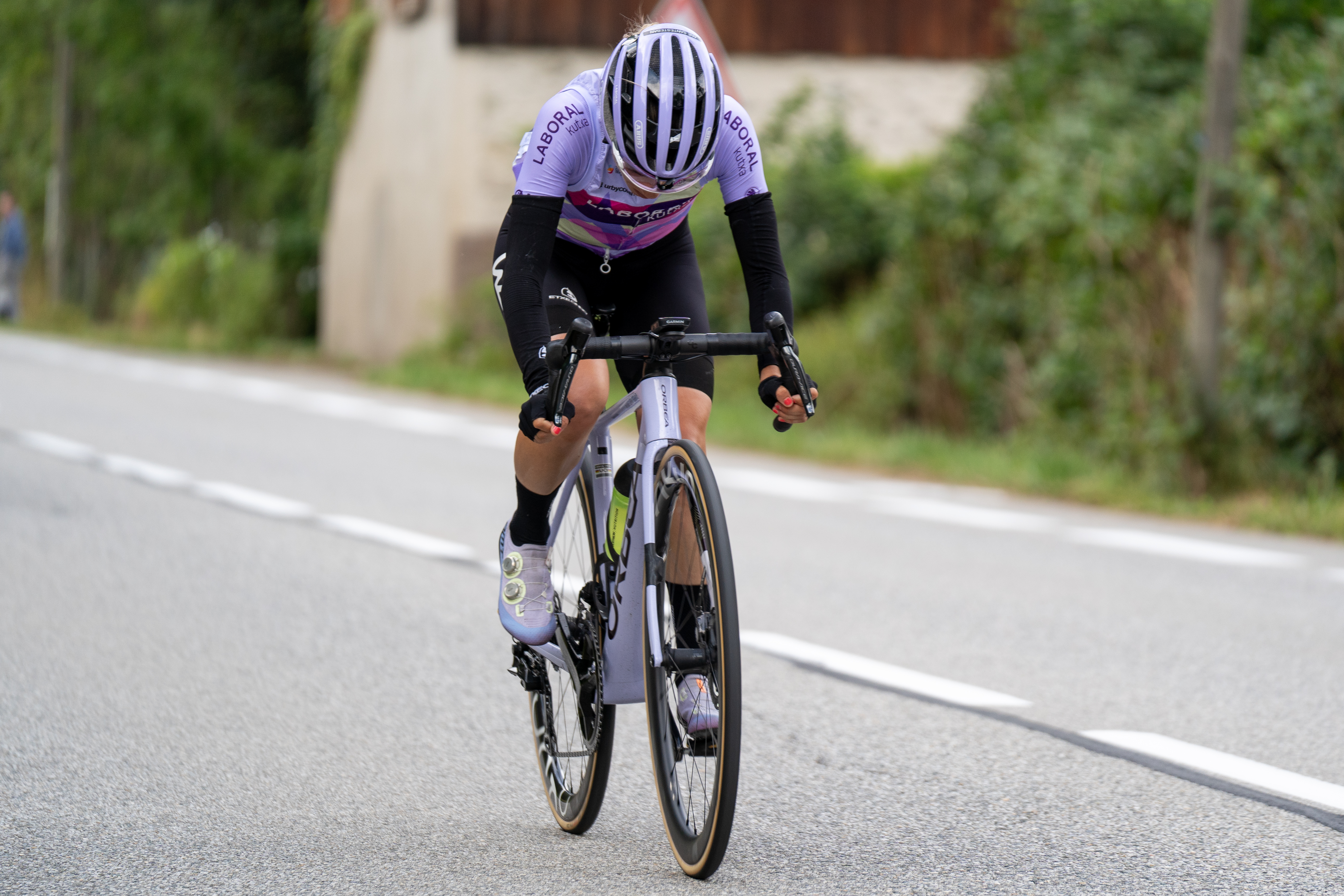
Ane SANTESTEBAN of team 'Laboral Kutxa-Fundación Euskadi' in stage 8 of the Tour de France Femmes 2024

== Team roster ==
As of 20 September 2024.

Rider	Date of birth
Naia Amondarain (ESP)	13 February 2001 (age 25)
Yurani Blanco (ESP)	3 February 1998 (age 28)
Idoia Eraso (ESP)	27 February 2002 (age 24)
Jessenia Meneses (COL)	18 June 1995 (age 31)
Usoa Ostolaza (ESP)	25 February 1998 (age 28)
Lourdes Oyarbide (ESP)	8 April 1994 (age 32)
Nadia Quagliotto (ITA)	22 March 1997 (age 29)
Marta Romeu (ESP)	21 May 1992 (age 34)
Ane Santesteban (ESP)	12 December 1990 (age 35)

Rider	Date of birth
Aileen Schweikart (GER)	27 March 1996 (age 30)
Debora Silvestri (ITA)	8 May 1998 (age 28)
Catalina Soto (CHI)	8 April 2001 (age 25)
Alba Teruel (ESP)	17 August 1996 (age 30)
Laura Tomasi (ITA)	1 July 1999 (age 27)
Cristina Tonetti (ITA)	6 July 2002 (age 24)
Eneritz Vadillo (ESP)	1 November 2004 (age 21)
Eri Yonamine (JPN)	25 April 1991 (age 35)

== Major results ==
2023
Stage 3 Vuelta Andalucia Women, Marta Romeu
2024
Stage 2 Tour Féminin des Pyrénées, Usoa Ostolaza
Tour Féminin des Pyrénées, Usoa Ostolaza

== National and continental champions ==
2021
Spain Track (Omnium), Eukene Larrarte
Spain Track (Madison), Tania Calvo
Spain Track (Madison), Eukene Larrarte
Spain Track (Individual pursuit), Tania Calvo
Spain Track (Elimination race), Eukene Larrarte
Spain Track (Scratch race), Tania Calvo
2022
Spain Track (Omnium), Tania Calvo
Spain Track (Madison), Tania Calvo
2023
Spain U23 Time Trial, Idoia Eraso
2024
Japan Road Race, Eri Yonamine
Spain Road Race, Usoa Ostolaza
2025
Asia Time Trial, Yanina Kuskova
Chile Time Trial, Catalina Anais Soto
Chile Road Race, Catalina Anais Soto
