= List of teams and cyclists in the 2022 Challenge by La Vuelta =

List of cyclists

131 riders across 22 teams took part in the 2022 Challenge by La Vuelta.

== Teams ==
UCI Women's WorldTeams

- UAE Team ADQ
- Canyon//SRAM
- EF Education–Tibco–SVB
- FDJ Suez Futuroscope
- Human Powered Health
- Liv Racing Xstra
- Movistar Team
- Roland Cogeas Edelweiss Squad
- SD Worx
- Team BikeExchange–Jayco
- Team DSM
- Team Jumbo–Visma
- Trek–Segafredo
- Uno-X Pro Cycling Team

UCI Women's Continental Teams

- Bizkaia–Durango
- Ceratizit–WNT Pro Cycling
- Laboral Kutxa–Fundación Euskadi
- Massi–Tactic
- Río Miera–Cantabria Deporte
- Soltec Team
- Team Coop–Hitec Products
- Valcar–Travel & Service

== Cyclists ==
Legend
No.	Starting number worn by the rider during the race
Pos.	Position in the general classification
Time	Deficit to the winner of the general classification
	Denotes the winner of the general classification
	Denotes the winner of the points classification
	Denotes the winner of the mountains classification
	Denotes riders that represent the winner of the team classification
DNS	Denotes a rider who did not start a stage, followed by the stage before which she withdrew
DNF	Denotes a rider who did not finish a stage, followed by the stage in which she withdrew
DSQ	Denotes a rider who was disqualified from the race, followed by the stage in which this occurred
OTL	Denotes a rider finished outside the time limit, followed by the stage in which they did so
COV	Denotes a rider who withdrawn because of COVID-19 either because she tested positive or two members of team tested positive, followed by the stage before which she withdrew
Ages correct as of Wednesday 7 September 2022, the date on which the race began

=== By starting number ===
No.	Name	Nationality	Team	Age	Pos.	Time	Ref.
1	Annemiek van Vleuten	Netherlands	Movistar Team	39	1	12h 21' 46"	
2	Katrine Aalerud	Norway	Movistar Team	27	42	+ 20' 08"	
3	Aude Biannic	France	Movistar Team	31	77	+ 36' 53"	
4	Sara Martín	Spain	Movistar Team	23	33	+ 16' 44"	
5	Emma Norsgaard	Denmark	Movistar Team	23	88	+ 43' 33"	
6	Arlenis Sierra	Cuba	Movistar Team	29	16	+ 5' 21"	
11	Demi Vollering	Netherlands	SD Worx	25	3	+ 2' 11"	
12	Niamh Fisher-Black	New Zealand	SD Worx	22	18	+ 6' 45"	
13	Lotte Kopecky	Belgium	SD Worx	26	21	+ 8' 41"	
14	Marlen Reusser	Switzerland	SD Worx	30	29	+ 12' 31"	
15	Anna Shackley	Great Britain	SD Worx	21	7	+ 3' 07"	
16	Blanka Vas	Hungary	SD Worx	21	28	+ 12' 07"	
21	Elisa Balsamo	Italy	Trek–Segafredo	24	30	+ 15' 52"	
22	Elynor Bäckstedt	Great Britain	Trek–Segafredo	20	DNS-3	–	
23	Lucinda Brand	Netherlands	Trek–Segafredo	33	57	+ 25' 52"	
24	Amalie Dideriksen	Denmark	Trek–Segafredo	26	94	+ 47' 12"	
25	Elisa Longo Borghini	Italy	Trek–Segafredo	30	2	+ 1' 44"	
26	Shirin van Anrooij	Netherlands	Trek–Segafredo	20	26	+ 11' 37"	
31	Cecilie Uttrup Ludwig	Denmark	FDJ Suez Futuroscope	27	5	+ 2' 43"	
32	Grace Brown	Australia	FDJ Suez Futuroscope	30	DNS-5	–	
33	Brodie Chapman	Australia	FDJ Suez Futuroscope	31	11	+ 3' 47"	
34	Vittoria Guazzini	Italy	FDJ Suez Futuroscope	21	40	+ 18' 31"	
35	Marie Le Net	France	FDJ Suez Futuroscope	22	64	+ 29' 46"	
36	Évita Muzic	France	FDJ Suez Futuroscope	23	43	+ 22' 08"	
41	Juliette Labous	France	Team DSM	23	9	+ 3' 35"	
42	Francesca Barale	Italy	Team DSM	19	41	+ 19' 29"	
43	Léa Curinier	France	Team DSM	21	DNF-4	–	
44	Megan Jastrab	United States	Team DSM	20	93	+ 46' 29"	
45	Liane Lippert	Germany	Team DSM	24	4	+ 2' 34"	
46	Floortje Mackaij	Netherlands	Team DSM	26	23	+ 11' 01"	
51	Katarzyna Niewiadoma	Poland	Canyon//SRAM	27	10	+ 3' 38"	
52	Alena Amialiusik		Canyon//SRAM	33	DNS-2	–	
53	Elise Chabbey	Switzerland	Canyon//SRAM	29	8	+ 3' 29"	
54	Mikayla Harvey	New Zealand	Canyon//SRAM	24	82	+ 40' 15"	
55	Pauliena Rooijakkers	Netherlands	Canyon//SRAM	29	25	+ 11' 21"	
56	Sarah Roy	Australia	Canyon//SRAM	36	51	+ 24' 11"	
61	Mavi García	Spain	UAE Team ADQ	38	13	+ 4' 09"	
62	Marta Bastianelli	Italy	UAE Team ADQ	35	48	+ 23' 50"	
63	Sofia Bertizzolo	Italy	UAE Team ADQ	25	24	+ 11' 13"	
64	Maaike Boogaard	Netherlands	UAE Team ADQ	24	65	+ 31' 01"	
65	Laura Tomasi	Italy	UAE Team ADQ	29	50	+ 24' 01"	
66	Sophie Wright	Great Britain	UAE Team ADQ	23	32	+ 16' 23"	
71	Anouska Koster	Netherlands	Team Jumbo–Visma	29	22	+ 10' 30"	
72	Carlijn Achtereekte	Netherlands	Team Jumbo–Visma	32	63	+ 29' 39"	
73	Amber Kraak	Netherlands	Team Jumbo–Visma	28	17	+ 6' 08"	
74	Linda Riedmann	Germany	Team Jumbo–Visma	19	78	+ 37' 12"	
75	Aafke Soet	Netherlands	Team Jumbo–Visma	24	DNS-2	–	
76	Karlijn Swinkels	Netherlands	Team Jumbo–Visma	23	DNS-2	–	
81	Ane Santesteban	Spain	Team BikeExchange–Jayco	31	6	+ 3' 03"	
82	Teniel Campbell	Trinidad and Tobago	Team BikeExchange–Jayco	24	92	+ 45' 45"	
83	Kristen Faulkner	United States	Team BikeExchange–Jayco	29	DNF-4	–	
84	Alexandra Manly	Australia	Team BikeExchange–Jayco	26	15	+ 4' 51"	
85	Ruby Roseman-Gannon	Australia	Team BikeExchange–Jayco	23	44	+ 22' 33"	
86	Georgia Williams	New Zealand	Team BikeExchange–Jayco	29	31	+ 16' 04"	
91	Silvia Persico	Italy	Valcar–Travel & Service	25	12	+ 3' 50"	
92	Olivia Baril	Canada	Valcar–Travel & Service	24	66	+ 31' 59"	
93	Chiara Consonni	Italy	Valcar–Travel & Service	23	85	+ 42' 27"	
94	Karolina Kumięga	Poland	Valcar–Travel & Service	23	75	+ 35' 09"	
95	Federica Damiana Piergiovanni	Italy	Valcar–Travel & Service	21	49	+ 23' 59"	
96	Elizabeth Stannard	Australia	Valcar–Travel & Service	25	34	+ 17' 01"	
101	Valerie Demey	Belgium	Liv Racing Xstra	28	62	+ 28' 37"	
102	Thalita de Jong	Netherlands	Liv Racing Xstra	28	72	+ 34' 25"	
103	Marta Jaskulska	Poland	Liv Racing Xstra	22	68	+ 33' 59"	
104	Tereza Neumanová	Czechia	Liv Racing Xstra	24	59	+ 26' 47"	
105	Sabrina Stultiens	Netherlands	Liv Racing Xstra	29	71	+ 34' 20"	
106	Quinty Ton	Netherlands	Liv Racing Xstra	24	55	+ 25' 03"	
111	Veronica Ewers	United States	EF Education–Tibco–SVB	28	14	+ 4' 48"	
112	Letizia Borghesi	Italy	EF Education–Tibco–SVB	23	46	+ 22' 53"	
113	Krista Doebel-Hickok	United States	EF Education–Tibco–SVB	33	DNF-2	–	
114	Sara Poidevin	Canada	EF Education–Tibco–SVB	26	90	+ 43' 45"	
115	Omer Shapira	Israel	EF Education–Tibco–SVB	27	53	+ 24' 45"	
116	Lauren Stephens	United States	EF Education–Tibco–SVB	35	52	+ 24' 26"	
121	Marta Lach	Poland	Ceratizit–WNT Pro Cycling	25	47	+ 23' 48"	
122	Sandra Alonso	Spain	Ceratizit–WNT Pro Cycling	24	45	+ 22' 52"	
123	Laura Asencio	France	Ceratizit–WNT Pro Cycling	24	37	+ 17' 48"	
124	Maria Giulia Confalonieri	Italy	Ceratizit–WNT Pro Cycling	29	39	+ 18' 26"	
125	Hanna Nilsson	Sweden	Ceratizit–WNT Pro Cycling	30	86	+ 42' 33"	
126	Lea Lin Teutenberg	Germany	Ceratizit–WNT Pro Cycling	23	91	+ 44' 21"	
131	Hannah Buch	Germany	Roland Cogeas Edelweiss Squad	19	102	+ 1h 07' 58"	
132	Ines Cantera	Spain	Roland Cogeas Edelweiss Squad	20	89	+ 43' 39"	
133	Léa Stern	Switzerland	Roland Cogeas Edelweiss Squad	20	DNF-2	–	
134	Petra Stiasny	Switzerland	Roland Cogeas Edelweiss Squad	20	DNF-4	–	
135	Anna Gabrielle Traxler	Canada	Roland Cogeas Edelweiss Squad	24	103	+ 1h 08' 43"	
141	Caroline Andersson	Sweden	Team Coop–Hitec Products	21	76	+ 36' 03"	
142	Ingvild Gåskjenn	Norway	Team Coop–Hitec Products	24	36	+ 17' 38"	
143	Ane Iversen	Norway	Team Coop–Hitec Products	29	DNF-5	–	
144	Josie Nelson	Great Britain	Team Coop–Hitec Products	20	35	+ 17' 22"	
145	Jessica Roberts	Great Britain	Team Coop–Hitec Products	23	DNF-5	–	
146	Nicole Steigenga	Netherlands	Team Coop–Hitec Products	24	74	+ 35' 07"	
151	Joscelin Lowden	Great Britain	Uno-X Pro Cycling Team	34	27	+ 11' 47"	
152	Marte Berg Edseth	Norway	Uno-X Pro Cycling Team	23	70	+ 34' 20"	
153	Julie Leth	Denmark	Uno-X Pro Cycling Team	30	73	+ 35' 02"	
154	Hannah Ludwig	Germany	Uno-X Pro Cycling Team	22	58	+ 26' 41"	
155	Amalie Lutro	Norway	Uno-X Pro Cycling Team	22	98	+ 56' 57"	
156	Anne Dorthe Ysland	Norway	Uno-X Pro Cycling Team	20	61	+ 28' 18"	
161	Nina Buijsman	Netherlands	Human Powered Health	24	54	+ 24' 46"	
162	Antri Christoforou	Cyprus	Human Powered Health	30	DNF-3	–	
163	Evy Kuijpers	Netherlands	Human Powered Health	27	100	+ 59' 27"	
164	Barbara Malcotti	Italy	Human Powered Health	22	38	+ 18' 25"	
165	Marit Raaijmakers	Netherlands	Human Powered Health	23	56	+ 25' 38"	
166	Eri Yonamine	Japan	Human Powered Health	31	19	+ 7' 37"	
171	Maaike Coljé	Netherlands	Massi–Tactic	25	DNF-4	–	
172	Aurela Nerlo	Poland	Massi–Tactic	24	83	+ 40' 46"	
173	Mireia Benito	Spain	Massi–Tactic	25	DNF-2	–	
174	Nathalie Eklund	Sweden	Massi–Tactic	31	DNF-4	–	
175	Miryam Maritza Núñez	Ecuador	Massi–Tactic	28	60	+ 27' 25"	
176	Andrea Ramirez	Mexico	Massi–Tactic	22	81	+ 38' 58"	
181	Lucía González	Spain	Bizkaia–Durango	32	84	+ 41' 24"	
182	Daniela Campos	Portugal	Bizkaia–Durango	20	99	+ 59' 10"	
183	Eukene Larrarte	Spain	Bizkaia–Durango	23	96	+ 49' 37"	
184	Irene Mendez	Spain	Bizkaia–Durango	30	67	+ 33' 26"	
185	Aileen Schweikart	Germany	Bizkaia–Durango	26	69	+ 34' 06"	
186	Catalina Anais Soto	Chile	Bizkaia–Durango	21	87	+ 43' 26"	
191	Anna Kiesenhofer	Austria	Soltec Team	31	20	+ 8' 12"	
192	Andrea Alzate	Colombia	Soltec Team	25	105	+ 1h 21' 26"	
193	Wendy Ducreux	Panama	Soltec Team	27	DNF-2	–	
194	Ana Vitória Magalhães	Brazil	Soltec Team	21	DNF-4	–	
195	Rocio Martín	Spain	Soltec Team	37	DNF-2	–	
196	Manuela Mureşan	Romania	Soltec Team	38	101	+ 1h 05' 14"	
201	Iurani Blanco	Spain	Laboral Kutxa–Fundación Euskadi	24	95	+ 48' 37"	
202	Tania Calvo	Spain	Laboral Kutxa–Fundación Euskadi	30	106	+ 1h 30' 21"	
203	Idoia Eraso	Spain	Laboral Kutxa–Fundación Euskadi	20	80	+ 38' 48"	
204	Ariana Gilabert	Spain	Laboral Kutxa–Fundación Euskadi	22	DNS-5	–	
205	Sandra Gutierrez	Spain	Laboral Kutxa–Fundación Euskadi	19	104	+ 1h 10' 36"	
206	Usoa Ostolaza	Spain	Laboral Kutxa–Fundación Euskadi	24	79	+ 38' 44"	
211	Carolina Esteban	Spain	Río Miera–Cantabria Deporte	21	DNF-5	–	
212	Eva Anguela	Spain	Río Miera–Cantabria Deporte	20	DNF-4	–	
213	Susana Perez	Spain	Río Miera–Cantabria Deporte	20	97	+ 50' 18"	
214	Mercedes Carmona	Spain	Río Miera–Cantabria Deporte	39	DNS-2	–	
215	Elena Perez	Spain	Río Miera–Cantabria Deporte	29	DNF-2	–	
216	Laura Tenorio	Spain	Río Miera–Cantabria Deporte	24	DNF-2	–	

=== By team ===
(Spain) Movistar Team (MOV)
No.	Rider	Pos.
1	Annemiek van Vleuten (NED)	1
2	Katrine Aalerud (NOR)	42
3	Aude Biannic (FRA)	77
4	Sara Martín (ESP)	33
5	Emma Norsgaard (DEN)	88
6	Arlenis Sierra (CUB)	16

(Netherlands) SD Worx (SDW)
No.	Rider	Pos.
11	Demi Vollering (NED)	3
12	Niamh Fisher-Black (NZL)	18
13	Lotte Kopecky (BEL)	21
14	Marlen Reusser (SUI)	29
15	Anna Shackley (GBR)	7
16	Blanka Vas (HUN)	28

(United States) Trek–Segafredo (TFS)
No.	Rider	Pos.
21	Elisa Balsamo (ITA)	30
22	Elynor Bäckstedt (GBR)	DNS-3
23	Lucinda Brand (NED)	57
24	Amalie Dideriksen (DEN)	94
25	Elisa Longo Borghini (ITA)	2
26	Shirin van Anrooij (NED)	26

(France) FDJ Suez Futuroscope (FDJ)
No.	Rider	Pos.
31	Cecilie Uttrup Ludwig (DEN)	5
32	Grace Brown (AUS)	DNS-5
33	Brodie Chapman (AUS)	11
34	Vittoria Guazzini (ITA)	40
35	Marie Le Net (FRA)	64
36	Évita Muzic (FRA)	43

(Netherlands) Team DSM (DSM)
No.	Rider	Pos.
41	Juliette Labous (FRA)	9
42	Francesca Barale (ITA)	41
43	Léa Curinier (FRA)	DNF-4
44	Megan Jastrab (USA)	93
45	Liane Lippert (GER)	4
46	Floortje Mackaij (NED)	23

(Germany) Canyon//SRAM (CSR)
No.	Rider	Pos.
51	Katarzyna Niewiadoma (POL)	10
52	Alena Amialiusik	DNS-2
53	Elise Chabbey (SUI)	8
54	Mikayla Harvey (NZL)	82
55	Pauliena Rooijakkers (NED)	25
56	Sarah Roy (AUS)	51

(Italy) UAE Team ADQ (UAD)
No.	Rider	Pos.
61	Mavi García (ESP)	13
62	Marta Bastianelli (ITA)	48
63	Sofia Bertizzolo (ITA)	24
64	Maaike Boogaard (NED)	65
65	Laura Tomasi (ITA)	50
66	Sophie Wright (GBR)	32

(Netherlands) Team Jumbo–Visma (JVW)
No.	Rider	Pos.
71	Anouska Koster (NED)	22
72	Carlijn Achtereekte (NED)	63
73	Amber Kraak (NED)	17
74	Linda Riedmann (GER)	78
75	Aafke Soet (NED)	DNS-2
76	Karlijn Swinkels (NED)	DNS-2

(Australia) Team BikeExchange–Jayco (BEX)
No.	Rider	Pos.
81	Ane Santesteban (ESP)	6
82	Teniel Campbell (TRI)	92
83	Kristen Faulkner (USA)	DNF-4
84	Alexandra Manly (AUS)	15
85	Ruby Roseman-Gannon (AUS)	44
86	Georgia Williams (NZL)	31

(Italy) Valcar–Travel & Service (VAL)
No.	Rider	Pos.
91	Silvia Persico (ITA)	12
92	Olivia Baril (CAN)	66
93	Chiara Consonni (ITA)	85
94	Karolina Kumięga (POL)	75
95	Federica Damiana Piergiovanni (ITA)	49
96	Elizabeth Stannard (AUS)	34

(Netherlands) Liv Racing Xstra (DSB)
No.	Rider	Pos.
101	Valerie Demey (BEL)	62
102	Thalita de Jong (NED)	72
103	Marta Jaskulska (POL)	68
104	Tereza Neumanová (CZE)	59
105	Sabrina Stultiens (NED)	71
106	Quinty Ton (NED)	55

(United States) EF Education–Tibco–SVB (EFE)
No.	Rider	Pos.
111	Veronica Ewers (USA)	14
112	Letizia Borghesi (ITA)	46
113	Krista Doebel-Hickok (USA)	DNF-2
114	Sara Poidevin (CAN)	90
115	Omer Shapira (ISR)	53
116	Lauren Stephens (USA)	52

(Germany) Ceratizit–WNT Pro Cycling (WNT)
No.	Rider	Pos.
121	Marta Lach (POL)	47
122	Sandra Alonso (ESP)	45
123	Laura Asencio (FRA)	37
124	Maria Giulia Confalonieri (ITA)	39
125	Hanna Nilsson (SWE)	86
126	Lea Lin Teutenberg (GER)	91

(Switzerland) Roland Cogeas Edelweiss Squad (CGS)
No.	Rider	Pos.
131	Hannah Buch (GER)	102
132	Ines Cantera (ESP)	89
133	Léa Stern (SUI)	DNF-2
134	Petra Stiasny (SUI)	DNF-4
135	Anna Gabrielle Traxler (CAN)	103

(Norway) Team Coop–Hitec Products (HPU)
No.	Rider	Pos.
141	Caroline Andersson (SWE)	76
142	Ingvild Gåskjenn (NOR)	36
143	Ane Iversen (NOR)	DNF-5
144	Josie Nelson (GBR)	35
145	Jessica Roberts (GBR)	DNF-5
146	Nicole Steigenga (NED)	74

(Norway) Uno-X Pro Cycling Team (UXT)
No.	Rider	Pos.
151	Joscelin Lowden (GBR)	27
152	Marte Berg Edseth (NOR)	70
153	Julie Leth (DEN)	73
154	Hannah Ludwig (GER)	58
155	Amalie Lutro (NOR)	98
156	Anne Dorthe Ysland (NOR)	61

(United States) Human Powered Health (HPW)
No.	Rider	Pos.
161	Nina Buijsman (NED)	54
162	Antri Christoforou (CYP)	DNF-3
163	Evy Kuijpers (NED)	100
164	Barbara Malcotti (ITA)	38
165	Marit Raaijmakers (NED)	56
166	Eri Yonamine (JPN)	19

(Spain) Massi–Tactic (MAT)
No.	Rider	Pos.
171	Maaike Coljé (NED)	DNF-4
172	Aurela Nerlo (POL)	83
173	Mireia Benito (ESP)	DNF-2
174	Nathalie Eklund (SWE)	DNF-4
175	Miryam Maritza Núñez (ECU)	60
176	Andrea Ramirez (MEX)	81

(Spain) Bizkaia–Durango (BDU)
No.	Rider	Pos.
181	Lucía González (ESP)	84
182	Daniela Campos (POR)	99
183	Eukene Larrarte (ESP)	96
184	Irene Mendez (ESP)	67
185	Aileen Schweikart (GER)	69
186	Catalina Anais Soto (CHI)	87

(Spain) Soltec Team (STC)
No.	Rider	Pos.
191	Anna Kiesenhofer (AUT)	20
192	Andrea Alzate (COL)	105
193	Wendy Ducreux (PAN)	DNF-2
194	Ana Vitória Magalhães (BRA)	DNF-4
195	Rocio Martín (ESP)	DNF-2
196	Manuela Mureşan (ROM)	101

(Spain) Laboral Kutxa–Fundación Euskadi (LKF)
No.	Rider	Pos.
201	Iurani Blanco (ESP)	95
202	Tania Calvo (ESP)	106
203	Idoia Eraso (ESP)	80
204	Ariana Gilabert (ESP)	DNS-5
205	Sandra Gutierrez (ESP)	104
206	Usoa Ostolaza (ESP)	79

(Spain) Río Miera–Cantabria Deporte (RMC)
No.	Rider	Pos.
211	Carolina Esteban (ESP)	DNF-5
212	Eva Anguela (ESP)	DNF-4
213	Susana Perez (ESP)	97
214	Mercedes Carmona (ESP)	DNS-2
215	Elena Perez (ESP)	DNF-2
216	Laura Tenorio (ESP)	DNF-2

=== By nationality ===
Country	No. of riders	Finished	Stage wins
Australia	6	5	1 (Grace Brown)
Austria	1	1	
Belgium	2	2	
Brazil	1	0	
Canada	3	3	
Chile	1	1	
Colombia	1	1	
Cuba	1	1	
Cyprus	1	0	
Czechia	1	1	
Denmark	4	4	
Ecuador	1	1	
France	6	5	
Germany	6	6	
Great Britain	6	4	
Hungary	1	1	
Israel	1	1	
Italy	13	13	2 (Elisa Balsamo, Silvia Persico)
Japan	1	1	
Mexico	1	1	
Netherlands	20	17	1 (Annemiek van Vleuten)
New Zealand	3	3	
Norway	6	5	
Panama	1	0	
Poland	5	5	
Portugal	1	1	
Romania	1	1	
Spain	22	14	
Sweden	3	2	
Switzerland	4	2	
Trinidad and Tobago	1	1	
United States	5	3	
	1	0	
Total	131	106	4
