= 2024 UCI Women's World Tour =

Series of women's road cycling races

- Ninth edition of the UCI Women's World Tour

Details
- Dates: 12 January – 20 October 2024
- Location: Europe; Oceania; Asia
- Races: 27

Champions
- Individual champion: Lotte Kopecky (Team SD Worx–Protime)
- Teams' champion: Team SD Worx–Protime

The 2024 UCI Women's World Tour was a competition that included twenty-seven road cycling events throughout the 2024 women's cycling season. It was the ninth edition of the UCI Women's World Tour, the ranking system launched by the Union Cycliste Internationale (UCI) in 2016. The competition began with the Women's Tour Down Under from 12 to 14 January, and finished with the Tour of Guangxi on 20 October.

Belgian rider Lotte Kopecky (Team SD Worx–Protime) won the individual classification with 4596 points, after a close battle with her teammate Demi Vollering throughout the season. Kopecky had six overall victories, including Strade Bianche Donne and Paris–Roubaix Femmes.

Second place went to Dutch rider Demi Vollering (Team SD Worx–Protime) with 4175 points. Vollering won four events, including La Vuelta Femenina. Third place was taken by Italian rider Elisa Longo Borghini (Lidl–Trek) with 3327 points, with Longo Borghini winning two events – Giro d'Italia Women and Tour of Flanders.

For the fourth year in a row, the teams classification was won by Team SD Worx–Protime – making it their eighth win in nine seasons. Thirteen different riders won races, with six riders holding the individual classification lead during the season. For the third year running, the youth classification was won by Dutch rider Shirin van Anrooij (Lidl–Trek), who finished 11th in the individual classification.

== Events ==
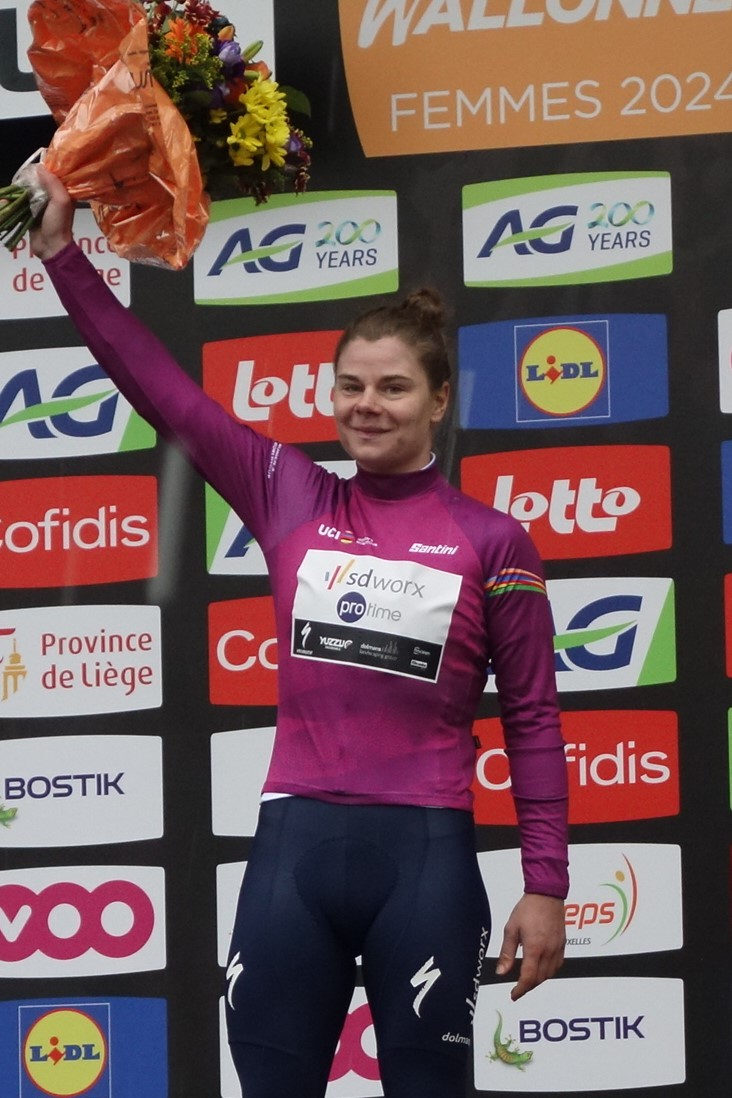
Lotte Kopecky (pictured at the La Flèche Wallonne Féminine) won the overall classification, with her team SD Worx winning the team classification

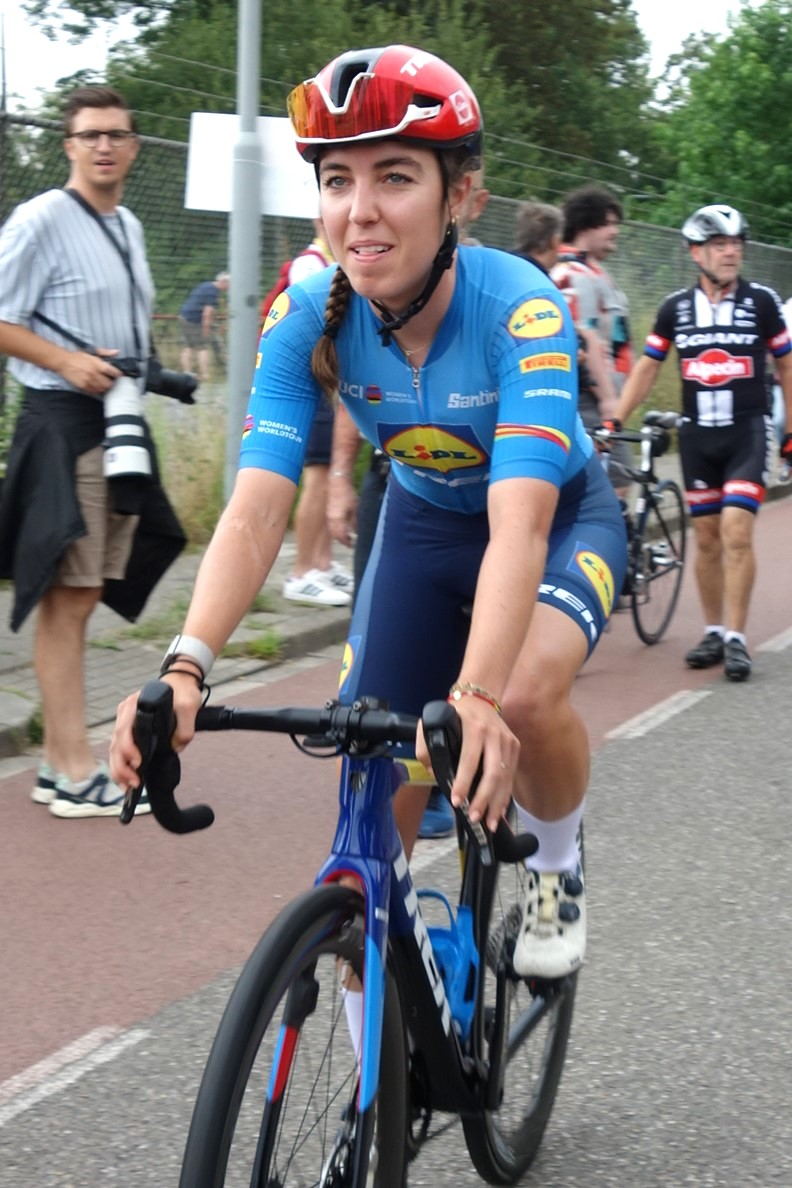
Shirin van Anrooij (pictured at Tour de France Femmes) won the youth classification

The race calendar for the 2024 season was announced in June 2023, with twenty eight races initially scheduled. The calendar was largely similar to 2023, with the dates of races moved to accommodate the 2024 Summer Olympics and 2024 Summer Paralympics. Rumoured events such as women's editions of the Giro di Lombardia or Milan–San Remo, or promotion of the Thüringen Ladies Tour to the World Tour calendar did not occur.

In January 2024, SweetSpot – the organiser and promoter of The Women's Tour – entered liquidation and the race was initially removed from the 2024 calendar. The following month, British Cycling took over the running of the race, which was to be renamed as the Tour of Britain Women, and the race returned to the calendar but over a shorter four-day itinerary. In May 2024, the Tour of Scandinavia was cancelled due to a lack of funding.

Races in the 2024 UCI Women's World Tour
| Race | Date | First | Second | Third | Leader |
|---|---|---|---|---|---|
| (Australia) Women's Tour Down Under | 12–14 January | Sarah Gigante (AUS) | Nienke Vinke (NED) | Neve Bradbury (AUS) | Sarah Gigante (AUS) |
| (Australia) Cadel Evans Great Ocean Road Race | 27 January | Rosita Reijnhout (NED) | Dominika Włodarczyk (POL) | Cecilie Uttrup Ludwig (DEN) | Dominika Włodarczyk (POL) |
| (United Arab Emirates) UAE Tour | 8–11 February | Lotte Kopecky (BEL) | Neve Bradbury (AUS) | Mavi García (ESP) | Neve Bradbury (AUS) |
| (Belgium) Omloop Het Nieuwsblad | 24 February | Marianne Vos (NED) | Lotte Kopecky (BEL) | Elisa Longo Borghini (ITA) | Lotte Kopecky (BEL) |
| (Italy) Strade Bianche Donne | 2 March | Lotte Kopecky (BEL) | Elisa Longo Borghini (ITA) | Demi Vollering (NED) | Lotte Kopecky (BEL) |
| (Netherlands) Ronde van Drenthe | 10 March | Lorena Wiebes (NED) | Elisa Balsamo (ITA) | Puck Pieterse (NED) | Lotte Kopecky (BEL) |
| (Italy) Trofeo Alfredo Binda-Comune di Cittiglio | 17 March | Elisa Balsamo (ITA) | Lotte Kopecky (BEL) | Puck Pieterse (NED) | Lotte Kopecky (BEL) |
| (Belgium) Classic Brugge–De Panne | 21 March | Elisa Balsamo (ITA) | Charlotte Kool (NED) | Daria Pikulik (POL) | Lotte Kopecky (BEL) |
| (Belgium) Gent–Wevelgem | 24 March | Lorena Wiebes (NED) | Elisa Balsamo (ITA) | Chiara Consonni (ITA) | Lotte Kopecky (BEL) |
| (Belgium) Tour of Flanders | 31 March | Elisa Longo Borghini (ITA) | Katarzyna Niewiadoma (POL) | Shirin van Anrooij (NED) | Lotte Kopecky (BEL) |
| (France) Paris–Roubaix Femmes | 6 April | Lotte Kopecky (BEL) | Elisa Balsamo (ITA) | Pfeiffer Georgi (GBR) | Lotte Kopecky (BEL) |
| (Netherlands) Amstel Gold Race | 14 April | Marianne Vos (NED) | Lorena Wiebes (NED) | Ingvild Gåskjenn (NOR) | Lotte Kopecky (BEL) |
| (Belgium) La Flèche Wallonne Femmes | 17 April | Katarzyna Niewiadoma (POL) | Demi Vollering (NED) | Elisa Longo Borghini (ITA) | Lotte Kopecky (BEL) |
| (Belgium) Liège–Bastogne–Liège Femmes | 21 April | Grace Brown (AUS) | Elisa Longo Borghini (ITA) | Demi Vollering (NED) | Lotte Kopecky (BEL) |
| (Spain) La Vuelta Femenina | 28 April – 5 May | Demi Vollering (NED) | Riejanne Markus (NED) | Elisa Longo Borghini (ITA) | Elisa Longo Borghini (ITA) |
| (Spain) Itzulia Women | 10–12 May | Demi Vollering (NED) | Mischa Bredewold (NED) | Juliette Labous (FRA) | Elisa Longo Borghini (ITA) |
| (Spain) Vuelta a Burgos Feminas | 16–19 May | Demi Vollering (NED) | Évita Muzic (FRA) | Karlijn Swinkels (NED) | Demi Vollering (NED) |
| (United Kingdom) RideLondon Classique | 24–26 May | Lorena Wiebes (NED) | Charlotte Kool (NED) | Lotte Kopecky (BEL) | Demi Vollering (NED) |
| (United Kingdom) Tour of Britain Women | 6–9 June | Lotte Kopecky (BEL) | Anna Henderson (GBR) | Christine Majerus (LUX) | Lotte Kopecky (BEL) |
| (Switzerland) Tour de Suisse Women | 15–18 June | Demi Vollering (NED) | Neve Bradbury (AUS) | Elisa Longo Borghini (ITA) | Demi Vollering (NED) |
| (Italy) Giro d'Italia Women | 7–14 July | Elisa Longo Borghini (ITA) | Lotte Kopecky (BEL) | Neve Bradbury (AUS) | Lotte Kopecky (BEL) |
| Tour de France Femmes | 12–18 August | Katarzyna Niewiadoma (POL) | Demi Vollering (NED) | Pauliena Rooijakkers (NED) | Demi Vollering (NED) |
| (France) Classic Lorient Agglomération | 24 August | Mischa Bredewold (NED) | Chloé Dygert (USA) | Liane Lippert (GER) | Demi Vollering (NED) |
| (Switzerland) Tour de Romandie Féminin | 6–8 September | Lotte Kopecky (BEL) | Demi Vollering (NED) | Gaia Realini (ITA) | Demi Vollering (NED) |
| (Netherlands) Simac Ladies Tour | 8–13 October | Lotte Kopecky (BEL) | Franziska Koch (GER) | Zoe Bäckstedt (GBR) | Lotte Kopecky (BEL) |
| (China) Tour of Chongming Island | 15–17 October | Marta Lach (POL) | Mylène de Zoete (NED) | Scarlett Souren (NED) | Lotte Kopecky (BEL) |
| (China) Tour of Guangxi | 20 October | Sandra Alonso (ESP) | Giada Borghesi (ITA) | Marta Lach (POL) | Lotte Kopecky (BEL) |

== 2024 UCI Women's WorldTeams ==
The fifteen Women's WorldTeams were automatically invited to compete in events, with the two best 2023 UCI Women's Continental Teams (Cofidis and Tashkent City Women Professional Cycling Team) also invited automatically. Other Continental women's teams were invited by the organisers of each race.

- AG Insurance–Soudal
- Canyon//SRAM
- Ceratizit–WNT Pro Cycling
- FDJ–Suez
- Fenix–Deceuninck
- Human Powered Health
- Lidl–Trek
- Liv AlUla Jayco
- Movistar Team
- Roland
- Team dsm–firmenich PostNL
- Team SD Worx–Protime
- UAE Team ADQ
- Uno-X Mobility
- Visma–Lease a Bike
