= 2024 Tour of Guangxi (women's race) =

2024 UCI Women's World Tour, race 27 of 27

Race details
- Dates: 20 October 2024
- Stages: 1
- Distance: 134.3 km (83.45 mi)
- Winning time: 3h 39' 02"

Results
| | Winner | Sandra Alonso (ESP) | (Ceratizit–WNT Pro Cycling) |
| | Second | Giada Borghesi (ITA) | (Human Powered Health) |
| | Third | Marta Lach (POL) | (Ceratizit–WNT Pro Cycling) |

The 2024 Tour of Guangxi was the 5th edition of the Tour of Guangxi road cycling one day race, which was held on 20 October 2024 as part of the 2024 UCI Women's World Tour calendar.

== Teams ==
Four UCI Women's WorldTeams, thirteen UCI Women's Continental Teams and one national team made up the eighteen teams that participated in the race.

UCI Women's WorldTeams

- UAE Team ADQ
- Ceratizit–WNT Pro Cycling
- Human Powered Health
- Roland

UCI Women's Continental Teams

- VolkerWessels Women Cyclingteam
- Laboral Kutxa–Fundación Euskadi
- Lotto–Dstny Ladies
- BTC City Ljubljana Zhiraf Ambedo
- Winspace
- Team Coop–Repsol
- Thailand Women's Cycling Team
- ARA Skip Capital
- Team Dukla Praha
- HKSI Pro Cycling Team
- China Liv Pro Cycling
- Li Ning Star Ladies
- Bodywrap LTwoo Women's Cycling Team

National teams

- China

== Results ==
Result
| Rank | Rider | Team | Time |
|---|---|---|---|
| 1 | Sandra Alonso (ESP) | Ceratizit–WNT Pro Cycling | 3h 39' 02" |
| 2 | Giada Borghesi (ITA) | Human Powered Health | + 0" |
| 3 | Marta Lach (POL) | Ceratizit–WNT Pro Cycling | + 2' 47" |
| 4 | Kathrin Schweinberger (AUT) | Ceratizit–WNT Pro Cycling | + 2' 47" |
| 5 | Tamara Dronova | Roland | + 2' 47" |
| 6 | Silvia Zanardi (ITA) | Human Powered Health | + 2' 47" |
| 7 | Anne Knijnenburg (NED) | VolkerWessels Women Cyclingteam | + 2' 47" |
| 8 | Sophie Marr (AUS) | ARA Skip Capital | + 2' 47" |
| 9 | Nadia Quagliotto (ITA) | Laboral Kutxa–Fundación Euskadi | + 2' 47" |
| 10 | Eleonora Camilla Gasparrini (ITA) | UAE Team ADQ | + 2' 47" |
