= 2023 Tour of Scandinavia =

Cycling race

2023 UCI Women's World Tour, race 22 of 27

Race details
- Dates: 23–27 August 2023
- Stages: 5
- Distance: 570.4 km (354.4 mi)
- Winning time: 14h 31' 05"

Results
Jersey awarded to the overall winner	Winner	Annemiek van Vleuten (NED)	(Movistar Team)
	Second	Cecilie Uttrup Ludwig (DEN)	(FDJ–Suez)
	Third	Amber Kraak (NED)	(Team Jumbo–Visma)
Jersey awarded to the points classification winner	Points	Cecilie Uttrup Ludwig (DEN)	(FDJ–Suez)
Jersey awarded to the mountains classification winner	Mountains	Elise Chabbey (SUI)	(Canyon//SRAM)
Jersey awarded to the young rider classification winner	Young rider	Alena Ivanchenko	(UAE Team ADQ)
Jersey awarded to the team classification winner	Team	(Belgium) Fenix–Deceuninck	

The 2023 Tour of Scandinavia was the second edition of the Tour of Scandinavia. The race took place from 23 to 27 August 2023 and was the 22nd event in the 2023 UCI Women's World Tour.

== Teams ==
Fifteen UCI Women's WorldTeams, three UCI Women's Continental Teams and one national team made up the nineteen teams that participated in the race.

UCI Women's WorldTeams

- Canyon//SRAM
- EF Education–Tibco–SVB
- FDJ–Suez
- Fenix–Deceuninck
- Human Powered Health
- Israel Premier Tech Roland
- Lidl–Trek
- Liv Racing TeqFind
- Movistar Team
- SD Worx
- Team dsm–firmenich
- Team Jayco–AlUla
- Team Jumbo–Visma
- UAE Team ADQ
- Uno-X Pro Cycling Team

UCI Women's Continental Teams

- AG Insurance–Soudal–Quick-Step
- Lifeplus Wahoo
- Team Coop–Hitec Products

National Teams

- Denmark

== Route and stages ==
Stage characteristics
Stage	Date	Course	Distance	Type	Winner
1	23 August	(Norway) Mysen to (Norway) Halden	124.6 km (77.4 mi)	Flat stage	Lorena Wiebes (NED)
2	24 August	(Norway) Vikersund to (Norway) Norefjell	150.5 km (93.5 mi)	Hilly stage	Cecilie Uttrup Ludwig (DEN)
3	25 August	(Norway) Kongsberg to (Norway) Larvik	134.9 km (83.8 mi)	Hilly stage	Lorena Wiebes (NED)
4	26 August	(Denmark) Herning to (Denmark) Herning	16.5 km (10.3 mi)	Individual time trial	Grace Brown (AUS)
5	27 August	(Denmark) Middelfart to (Denmark) Haderslev	143.9 km (89.4 mi)	Hilly stage	Cecilie Uttrup Ludwig (DEN)
Total			570.4 km (354.4 mi)		

== Stages ==
=== Stage 1 ===
23 August 2023 — Mysen to Halden, 124.6 km (77.4 mi)

Stage 1 Result
Rank	Rider	Team	Time
1	Lorena Wiebes (NED)	SD Worx	3h 19' 18"
2	Elisa Balsamo (ITA)	Lidl–Trek	+ 0"
3	Cecilie Uttrup Ludwig (DEN)	FDJ–Suez	+ 0"
4	Soraya Paladin (ITA)	Canyon//SRAM	+ 0"
5	Megan Jastrab (USA)	Team dsm–firmenich	+ 0"
6	Ingvild Gåskjenn (NOR)	Team Jayco–AlUla	+ 0"
7	Marta Jaskulska (POL)	Liv Racing TeqFind	+ 0"
8	Agnieszka Skalniak-Sójka (POL)	Canyon//SRAM	+ 0"
9	Elise Chabbey (SUI)	Canyon//SRAM	+ 0"
10	Greta Marturano (ITA)	Fenix–Deceuninck	+ 0"

General classification after Stage 1
Rank	Rider	Team	Time
1	Lorena Wiebes (NED)	SD Worx	3h 19' 08"
2	Elisa Balsamo (ITA)	Lidl–Trek	+ 4"
3	Cecilie Uttrup Ludwig (DEN)	FDJ–Suez	+ 6"
4	Soraya Paladin (ITA)	Canyon//SRAM	+ 10"
5	Megan Jastrab (USA)	Team dsm–firmenich	+ 10"
6	Ingvild Gåskjenn (NOR)	Team Jayco–AlUla	+ 10"
7	Marta Jaskulska (POL)	Liv Racing TeqFind	+ 10"
8	Agnieszka Skalniak-Sójka (POL)	Canyon//SRAM	+ 10"
9	Elise Chabbey (SUI)	Canyon//SRAM	+ 10"
10	Greta Marturano (ITA)	Fenix–Deceuninck	+ 10"

=== Stage 2 ===
24 August 2023 — Vikersund to Norefjell, 150.5 km (93.5 mi)

Stage 2 Result
Rank	Rider	Team	Time
1	Cecilie Uttrup Ludwig (DEN)	FDJ–Suez	3h 50' 28"
2	Annemiek van Vleuten (NED)	Movistar Team	+ 0"
3	Kim Cadzow (NZL)	Team Jumbo–Visma	+ 2"
4	Greta Marturano (ITA)	Fenix–Deceuninck	+ 3"
5	Liane Lippert (GER)	Movistar Team	+ 23"
6	Ane Santesteban (ESP)	Team Jayco–AlUla	+ 31"
7	Olivia Baril (CAN)	UAE Team ADQ	+ 31"
8	Amber Kraak (NED)	Team Jumbo–Visma	+ 31"
9	Ashleigh Moolman (RSA)	AG Insurance–Soudal–Quick-Step	+ 31"
10	Elise Chabbey (SUI)	Canyon//SRAM	+ 31"

General classification after Stage 2
Rank	Rider	Team	Time
1	Cecilie Uttrup Ludwig (DEN)	FDJ–Suez	7h 09' 32"
2	Annemiek van Vleuten (NED)	Movistar Team	+ 8"
3	Greta Marturano (ITA)	Fenix–Deceuninck	+ 17"
4	Liane Lippert (GER)	Movistar Team	+ 37"
5	Elise Chabbey (SUI)	Canyon//SRAM	+ 45"
6	Amber Kraak (NED)	Team Jumbo–Visma	+ 45"
7	Ashleigh Moolman (RSA)	AG Insurance–Soudal–Quick-Step	+ 45"
8	Yara Kastelijn (NED)	Fenix–Deceuninck	+ 45"
9	Olivia Baril (CAN)	UAE Team ADQ	+ 45"
10	Niamh Fisher-Black (NZL)	SD Worx	+ 45"

=== Stage 3 ===
25 August 2023 — Kongsberg to Larvik, 134.9 km (83.8 mi)

Stage 3 Result
Rank	Rider	Team	Time
1	Lorena Wiebes (NED)	SD Worx	3h 24' 26"
2	Liane Lippert (GER)	Movistar Team	+ 0"
3	Cecilie Uttrup Ludwig (DEN)	FDJ–Suez	+ 0"
4	Amber Kraak (NED)	Team Jumbo–Visma	+ 0"
5	Elise Chabbey (SUI)	Canyon//SRAM	+ 0"
6	Ashleigh Moolman (RSA)	AG Insurance–Soudal–Quick-Step	+ 0"
7	Anouska Koster (NED)	Uno-X Pro Cycling Team	+ 0"
8	Sofia Bertizzolo (ITA)	UAE Team ADQ	+ 0"
9	Megan Jastrab (USA)	Team dsm–firmenich	+ 0"
10	Greta Marturano (ITA)	Fenix–Deceuninck	+ 0"

General classification after Stage 3
Rank	Rider	Team	Time
1	Cecilie Uttrup Ludwig (DEN)	FDJ–Suez	10h 33' 54"
2	Annemiek van Vleuten (NED)	Movistar Team	+ 12"
3	Greta Marturano (ITA)	Fenix–Deceuninck	+ 21"
4	Liane Lippert (GER)	Movistar Team	+ 35"
5	Amber Kraak (NED)	Team Jumbo–Visma	+ 49"
6	Elise Chabbey (SUI)	Canyon//SRAM	+ 49"
7	Ashleigh Moolman (RSA)	AG Insurance–Soudal–Quick-Step	+ 49"
8	Olivia Baril (CAN)	UAE Team ADQ	+ 49"
9	Ricarda Bauernfeind (GER)	Canyon//SRAM	+ 49"
10	Yara Kastelijn (NED)	Fenix–Deceuninck	+ 54"

=== Stage 4 ===
26 August 2023 — Herning to Herning, 16.5 km (10.3 mi) (ITT)

Stage 4 Result
Rank	Rider	Team	Time
1	Grace Brown (AUS)	FDJ–Suez	20' 36"
2	Amber Kraak (NED)	Team Jumbo–Visma	+ 19"
3	Annemiek van Vleuten (NED)	Movistar Team	+ 23"
4	Lauretta Hanson (AUS)	Lidl–Trek	+ 31"
5	Maaike Boogaard (NED)	AG Insurance–Soudal–Quick-Step	+ 39"
6	Franziska Koch (GER)	Team dsm–firmenich	+ 39"
7	Zoe Bäckstedt (GBR)	EF Education–Tibco–SVB	+ 40"
8	Kim Cadzow (NZL)	Team Jumbo–Visma	+ 42"
9	Audrey Cordon-Ragot (FRA)	Human Powered Health	+ 45"
10	Brodie Chapman (AUS)	Lidl–Trek	+ 46"

General classification after Stage 4
Rank	Rider	Team	Time
1	Annemiek van Vleuten (NED)	Movistar Team	10h 55' 05"
2	Cecilie Uttrup Ludwig (DEN)	FDJ–Suez	+ 17"
3	Amber Kraak (NED)	Team Jumbo–Visma	+ 33"
4	Liane Lippert (GER)	Movistar Team	+ 51"
5	Grace Brown (AUS)	FDJ–Suez	+ 54"
6	Olivia Baril (CAN)	UAE Team ADQ	+ 1' 06"
7	Ricarda Bauernfeind (GER)	Canyon//SRAM	+ 1' 16"
8	Greta Marturano (ITA)	Fenix–Deceuninck	+ 1' 17"
9	Alena Ivanchenko	UAE Team ADQ	+ 1' 18"
10	Eglantine Rayer (FRA)	Team dsm–firmenich	+ 1' 25"

=== Stage 5 ===
27 August 2023 — Middelfart to Haderslev, 143.9 km (89.4 mi)

Stage 5 Result
Rank	Rider	Team	Time
1	Cecilie Uttrup Ludwig (DEN)	FDJ–Suez	3h 35' 55"
2	Lorena Wiebes (NED)	SD Worx	+ 5"
3	Elisa Balsamo (ITA)	Lidl–Trek	+ 5"
4	Tamara Dronova	Israel Premier Tech Roland	+ 5"
5	Sofia Bertizzolo (ITA)	UAE Team ADQ	+ 5"
6	Liane Lippert (GER)	Movistar Team	+ 5"
7	Letizia Borghesi (ITA)	EF Education–Tibco–SVB	+ 5"
8	Yara Kastelijn (NED)	Fenix–Deceuninck	+ 5"
9	Eglantine Rayer (FRA)	Team dsm–firmenich	+ 5"
10	Ruby Roseman-Gannon (AUS)	Team Jayco–AlUla	+ 5"

General classification after Stage 5
Rank	Rider	Team	Time
1	Annemiek van Vleuten (NED)	Movistar Team	14h 31' 05"
2	Cecilie Uttrup Ludwig (DEN)	FDJ–Suez	+ 2"
3	Amber Kraak (NED)	Team Jumbo–Visma	+ 33"
4	Liane Lippert (GER)	Movistar Team	+ 51"
5	Grace Brown (AUS)	FDJ–Suez	+ 54"
6	Olivia Baril (CAN)	UAE Team ADQ	+ 1' 06"
7	Ricarda Bauernfeind (GER)	Canyon//SRAM	+ 1' 16"
8	Alena Ivanchenko	UAE Team ADQ	+ 1' 18"
9	Eglantine Rayer (FRA)	Team dsm–firmenich	+ 1' 25"
10	Yara Kastelijn (NED)	Fenix–Deceuninck	+ 1' 40"

== Classification leadership ==
Classification leadership by stage
Stage	Winner	General classification	Points classification	Mountains classification	Young rider classification	Team classification
1	Lorena Wiebes	Lorena Wiebes	Lorena Wiebes	Elise Chabbey	Megan Jastrab	Canyon//SRAM
2	Cecilie Uttrup Ludwig	Cecilie Uttrup Ludwig	Cecilie Uttrup Ludwig	Cecilie Uttrup Ludwig	Eglantine Rayer	Fenix–Deceuninck
3	Lorena Wiebes	Cecilie Uttrup Ludwig	Cecilie Uttrup Ludwig	Elise Chabbey	Eglantine Rayer	Fenix–Deceuninck
4	Grace Brown	Annemiek van Vleuten	Cecilie Uttrup Ludwig	Elise Chabbey	Alena Ivanchenko	Fenix–Deceuninck
5	Cecilie Uttrup Ludwig	Annemiek van Vleuten	Cecilie Uttrup Ludwig	Elise Chabbey	Alena Ivanchenko	Fenix–Deceuninck
Final		Annemiek van Vleuten	Cecilie Uttrup Ludwig	Elise Chabbey	Alena Ivanchenko	Fenix–Deceuninck

== Classification standings ==
Legend
Denotes the winner of the general classification	Denotes the winner of the points classification
Denotes the winner of the mountains classification	Denotes the winner of the young rider classification

=== General classification ===
Final general classification (1–10)
Rank	Rider	Team	Time
1	Annemiek van Vleuten (NED)	Movistar Team	14h 31' 05"
2	Cecilie Uttrup Ludwig (DEN)	FDJ–Suez	+ 2"
3	Amber Kraak (NED)	Team Jumbo–Visma	+ 33"
4	Liane Lippert (GER)	Movistar Team	+ 51"
5	Grace Brown (AUS)	FDJ–Suez	+ 54"
6	Olivia Baril (CAN)	UAE Team ADQ	+ 1' 06"
7	Ricarda Bauernfeind (GER)	Canyon//SRAM	+ 1' 16"
8	Alena Ivanchenko	UAE Team ADQ	+ 1' 18"
9	Eglantine Rayer (FRA)	Team dsm–firmenich	+ 1' 25"
10	Yara Kastelijn (NED)	Fenix–Deceuninck	+ 1' 40"

=== Points classification ===
Final points classification (1–10)
Rank	Rider	Team	Points
1	Cecilie Uttrup Ludwig (DEN)	FDJ–Suez	22
2	Lorena Wiebes (NED)	SD Worx	19
3	Maggie Coles-Lyster (CAN)	Israel Premier Tech Roland	13
4	Annemiek van Vleuten (NED)	Movistar Team	9
5	Elisa Balsamo (ITA)	Lidl–Trek	9
6	Teuntje Beekhuis (NED)	Team Jumbo–Visma	8
7	Amber Kraak (NED)	Team Jumbo–Visma	8
8	Liane Lippert (GER)	Movistar Team	8
9	Grace Brown (AUS)	FDJ–Suez	7
10	Megan Jastrab (USA)	Team DSM	7

=== Mountains classification ===
Final mountains classification (1–10)
Rank	Rider	Team	Points
1	Elise Chabbey (SUI)	Canyon//SRAM	27
2	Cecilie Uttrup Ludwig (DEN)	FDJ–Suez	20
3	Olivia Baril (CAN)	UAE Team ADQ	11
4	Annemiek van Vleuten (NED)	Movistar Team	10
5	Liane Lippert (GER)	Movistar Team	10
6	Ricarda Bauernfeind (GER)	Canyon//SRAM	8
7	Niamh Fisher-Black (NZL)	SD Worx	8
8	Kim Cadzow (NZL)	Team Jumbo–Visma	8
9	Ashleigh Moolman (RSA)	AG Insurance–Soudal–Quick-Step	5
10	Hannah Ludwig (GER)	Uno-X Pro Cycling Team	5

=== Young rider classification ===
Final young rider classification (1–10)
Rank	Rider	Team	Points
1	Alena Ivanchenko	UAE Team ADQ	14h 32' 23"
2	Eglantine Rayer (FRA)	Team DSM	+ 7"
3	Ella Wyllie (NZL)	Lifeplus Wahoo	+ 1' 45"
4	Caroline Andersson (SWE)	Liv Racing TeqFind	+ 1' 46"
5	Kim Cadzow (NZL)	Team Jumbo–Visma	+ 2' 49"
6	Julia Borgström (SWE)	AG Insurance–Soudal–Quick-Step	+ 4' 42"
7	Maud Oudeman (NED)	Team Jumbo–Visma	+ 9' 29"
8	Silke Smulders (NED)	Liv Racing TeqFind	+ 12' 17"
9	Megan Jastrab (USA)	Team dsm–firmenich	+ 14' 48"
10	Eleonora Camilla Gasparrini (ITA)	UAE Team ADQ	+ 17' 15"

=== Team classification ===
Final team classification (1–10)
Rank	Team	Time
1	(Belgium) Fenix–Deceuninck	43h 38' 20"
2	(Netherlands) Team dsm–firmenich	+ 58"
3	(Spain) Movistar Team	+ 1' 53"
4	(United Arab Emirates) UAE Team ADQ	+ 1' 58"
5	(Switzerland) Israel Premier Tech Roland	+ 2' 43"
6	(Netherlands) Team Jumbo–Visma	+ 5' 32"
7	(Germany) Canyon//SRAM	+ 7' 15"
8	(France) FDJ–Suez	+ 9' 13"
9	(Australia) Team Jayco–AlUla	+ 9' 39"
10	(United States) Lidl–Trek	+ 11' 53"
