= 2024 Paris–Roubaix Femmes =

Cycling race

2024 Paris–Roubaix Femmes avec Zwift
2024 UCI Women's World Tour, race 11 of 27
- Official event poster

Race details
- Dates: 6 April 2024
- Stages: 1
- Distance: 148.5 km (92.27 mi)
- Winning time: 3h 47' 13"

Results
	Winner	Lotte Kopecky (BEL)	(Team SD Worx–Protime)
	Second	Elisa Balsamo (ITA)	(Lidl–Trek)
	Third	Pfeiffer Georgi (GBR)	(Team dsm–firmenich PostNL)

The 2024 Paris–Roubaix Femmes (officially Paris–Roubaix Femmes avec Zwift) was a French road cycling one-day race that took place on 6 April. It was the 4th edition of Paris–Roubaix Femmes and the 11th event of the 2024 UCI Women's World Tour.

Held in unseasonably warm weather, the race was won by Belgian rider Lotte Kopecky of Team SD Worx–Protime in a sprint finish, with Kopecky also retaining her lead in the UCI Women's World Tour standings. The overall average speed for the race was 39.12 kilometres per hour (24.31 mph).

== Route ==
Starting in Denain, the race finished on the velodrome in Roubaix after covering 148.5 kilometres (92.3 mi), with 29.2 kilometres (18.1 mi) of cobblestones, spread out over 17 sectors – including the famed Carrefour de l'Arbre and the Mons-en-Pévèle – both ranked at "five stars" in difficulty. The women covered the same final 17 sectors as the men's race.

Organisers maintained that they consider it "too dangerous" to include the five-star cobbled sector Trouée d'Arenberg due to its proximity to the start in Denain, having previously noted that they "do not rule out that we will pass through ... in the future".

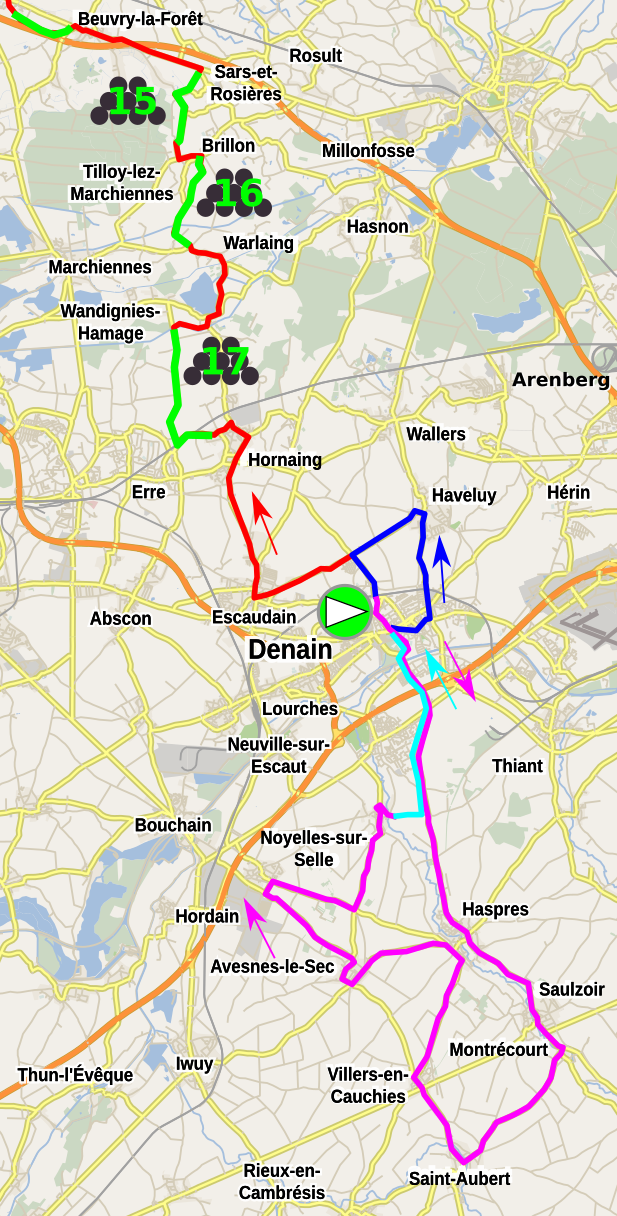
A loop south of the start in Denain before heading north

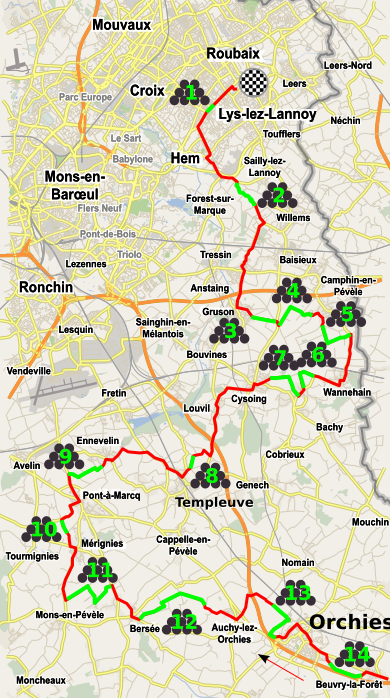
Route from Orchies to finish in Roubaix, similar to previous editions

== Teams ==
24 teams took part in the race. All 15 UCI Women's WorldTeams were automatically invited, and were joined by 9 UCI Women's Continental Teams. Cofidis received an automatic invitation as one of the two best 2023 UCI Women's Continental Teams, and the other eight teams were selected by Amaury Sport Organisation (ASO), the organisers of the race.

UCI Women's WorldTeams

- AG Insurance–Soudal
- Canyon–SRAM
- Ceratizit–WNT Pro Cycling
- FDJ–Suez
- Fenix–Deceuninck
- Human Powered Health
- Lidl–Trek
- Liv AlUla Jayco
- Movistar Team
- Roland
- Team dsm–firmenich PostNL
- Team SD Worx–Protime
- UAE Team ADQ
- Uno-X Mobility
- Visma–Lease a Bike

UCI Women's Continental Teams

- Arkéa–B&B Hotels Women
- Cofidis
- EF Education–Cannondale
- Lifeplus Wahoo
- St. Michel–Mavic–Auber93
- Team Coop–Repsol
- Team Komugi–Grand Est
- VolkerWessels Women Cyclingteam

== Race summary ==
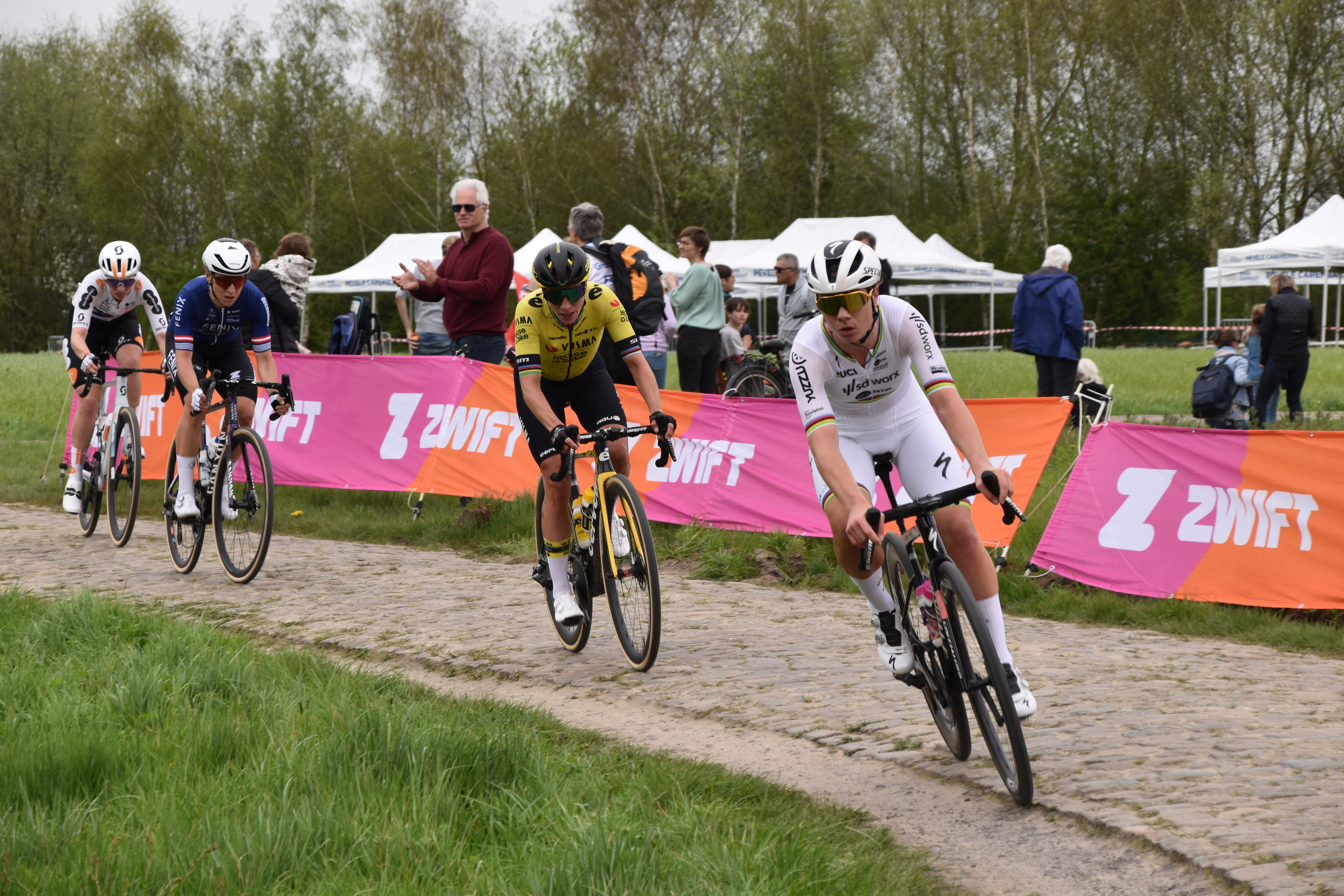
Lotte Kopecky of Team SD Worx–Protime leading the breakaway

Prior to the race, world champion Lotte Kopecky (Team SD Worx–Protime) was considered the favourite for the win, with Marianne Vos (Visma–Lease a Bike), Elisa Balsamo (Lidl–Trek) and Pfeiffer Georgi (Team dsm–firmenich PostNL) also thought to be contenders.

The race was held in unseasonably warm weather. An initial breakaway was caught within the first hour, with the peloton entering the first pavé sector together. With 54 kilometres (34 mi) remaining, Kopecky accelerated away from the peloton, followed by Vos and Georgi. Ellen van Dijk (Lidl–Trek) worked to pull them back, making a pack of 24 contenders at the head of the race at the five-star sector of pavé at Mons-en-Pévèle. Van Dijk made two unsuccessful attacks, before pulling away from the pack with Amber Kraak (FDJ–Suez) with around 22 kilometres (14 mi) remaining. Kopecky, Vos, Balsamo and Georgi soon joined, making a group of six with 10 kilometres (6.2 mi) remaining, with a lead of around 35 seconds. However, the gap fell rapidly as the group failed work together. Kopecky's teammate Lorena Wiebes led the chase group behind, discouraging attacks.

In the closing kilometres, van Dijk made efforts to keep a high pace in support of her teammate Balsamo – stabilising the time gap to the chase group behind, with the six having a lead of around 25 seconds entering the Roubaix Velodrome. In the final sprint, Vos was the first onto the finishing straight, but was overtaken by both Balsamo, Georgi and Kopecky – with Kopecky taking the win in a photo finish.

Following her victory, Kopecky stated that winning Paris–Roubaix had been her "goal of the season", and she praised her teammate Wiebes for discouraging the chasing group behind. SD-Worx expressed delight with their victory, calling it "revenge" after losing at Tour of Flanders the previous weekend. Cycling News noted that Vos once again missed out on the victory, calling it "a rare gap in her palmarès" – with Vos herself stating that "when you're riding for victory and you finish fourth, it hurts".

== Result ==
Result
Rank	Rider	Team	Time
1	Lotte Kopecky (BEL)	Team SD Worx–Protime	3h 47' 13"
2	Elisa Balsamo (ITA)	Lidl–Trek	+ 0"
3	Pfeiffer Georgi (GBR)	Team dsm–firmenich PostNL	+ 0"
4	Marianne Vos (NED)	Visma–Lease a Bike	+ 0"
5	Amber Kraak (NED)	FDJ–Suez	+ 0"
6	Ellen van Dijk (NED)	Lidl–Trek	+ 6"
7	Lorena Wiebes (NED)	Team SD Worx–Protime	+ 28"
8	Victoire Berteau (FRA)	Cofidis	+ 28"
9	Marie Le Net (FRA)	FDJ–Suez	+ 28"
10	Kimberley Le Court (MRI)	AG Insurance–Soudal	+ 28"
