= Rosita Reijnhout =

Dutch cyclist

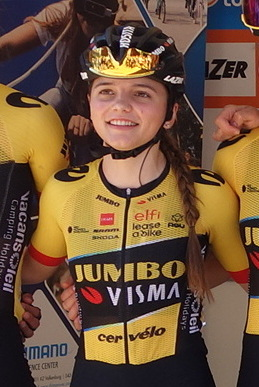
- Reijnhout in 2023

Personal information
- Born: 8 April 2004 (age 22)

Cycling career
- Sport: Cycling
- Current team: Visma–Lease a Bike
- Discipline: Road
- Role: Rider

Amateur team
- 2021–2022: Restore Cycling Team

Professional team
- 2023–: Team Jumbo–Visma

Major wins
- One-day races and Classics Great Ocean Road Race (2024)

Rosita Reijnhout (born 8 April 2004) is a Dutch professional racing cyclist, who currently rides for UCI Women's WorldTeam Visma–Lease a Bike. She won the 2024 Cadel Evans Great Ocean Road Race, an event on the UCI Women's World Tour.

== Major results ==
2021
5th Overall Bizkaikoloreak
2022
5th Road race, National Junior Road Championships
5th Overall Bizkaikoloreak
8th Course de Côtes Vresse-sur-Semois
2024
1st Cadel Evans Great Ocean Road Race
8th GP Oetingen
2026
9th Cadel Evans Great Ocean Road Race
