= Tour of Scandinavia =

Race details
- Date: August
- Region: Norway, Sweden and Denmark
- Discipline: Road
- Competition: UCI Women's World Tour
- Type: Stage race
- Web site: www.battleofthenorth.eu

History
- First edition: 2022
- Editions: 2 (as of 2023)
- Final edition: 2023
- First winner: Cecilie Uttrup Ludwig (DEN)
- Most wins: no repeat winners
- Final winner: Annemiek van Vleuten (NED)

The Tour of Scandinavia was a women's cycle stage race, that had stages in Norway, Sweden and Denmark, held in August. It was the successor of Ladies Tour of Norway and its first edition was held in 2022. Its a UCI Women's World Tour event. The race was to be called Battle of the North but due to the Russian invasion of Ukraine the organisers renamed it Tour of Scandinavia.

In May 2024, the 2024 edition of the race was cancelled due to a lack of funding. Originally planned to return in 2025, the organisers announced in January 2025 that the race would not be revived, due to lack of interest from sponsors and host broadcasters.

== Overall winners ==
Year	Winner	Second	Third
2022	Cecilie Uttrup Ludwig (DEN)	Liane Lippert (GER)	Alexandra Manly (AUS)
2023	Annemiek van Vleuten (NED)	Cecilie Uttrup Ludwig (DEN)	Amber Kraak (NED)
2024	No race due to funding.		
