= 2024 Amstel Gold Race (women's race) =

2024 Amstel Gold Race Ladies Edition
2024 UCI Women's World Tour, race 12 of 27
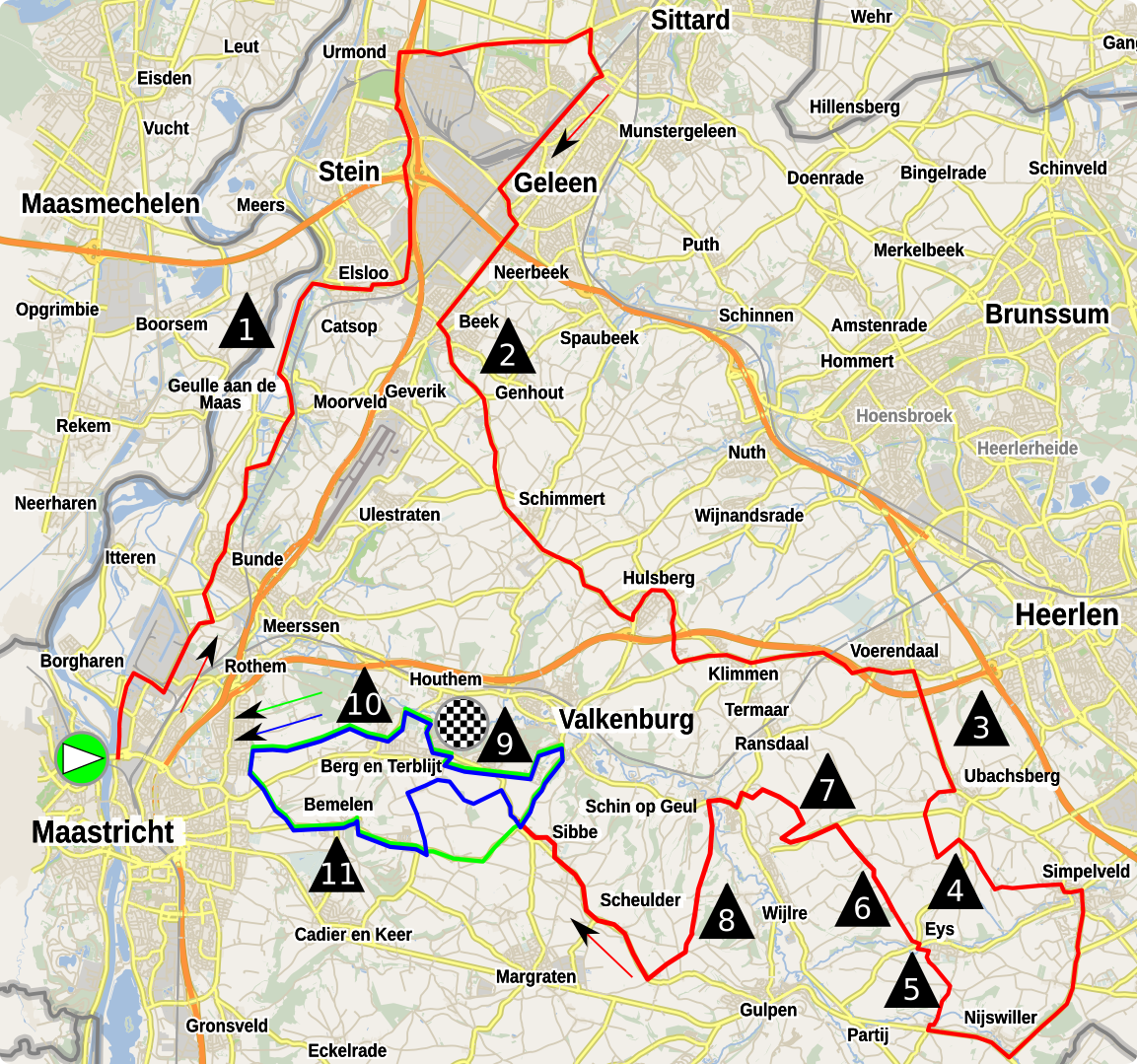
- Course map

Race details
- Dates: 14 April 2024
- Stages: 1
- Distance: 157.6 km (97.93 mi)
- Winning time: 2h 35' 02"

Results
	Winner	Marianne Vos (NED)	(Visma–Lease a Bike)
	Second	Lorena Wiebes (NED)	(Team SD Worx–Protime)
	Third	Ingvild Gåskjenn (NOR)	(Liv AlUla Jayco)

The 2024 Amstel Gold Race Ladies Edition was a Dutch road cycling one-day race held on 14 April. It was the 10th edition of the Amstel Gold Race for women, and the 12th event of the 2024 UCI Women's World Tour. The race was won by Dutch rider Marianne Vos of Visma–Lease a Bike by a bike throw, after Lorena Wiebes of Team SD Worx–Protime celebrated too early in the sprint for the finish line.

== Teams ==
Fourteen UCI Women's WorldTeams and ten UCI Women's Continental Teams competed in the race.

UCI Women's WorldTeams

- AG Insurance–Soudal
- Canyon–SRAM
- FDJ–Suez
- Fenix–Deceuninck
- Human Powered Health
- Lidl–Trek
- Liv AlUla Jayco
- Movistar Team
- Roland
- Team dsm–firmenich PostNL
- Team SD Worx–Protime
- UAE Team ADQ
- Uno-X Mobility
- Visma–Lease a Bike

UCI Women's Continental Teams

- Chevalmeire
- Cofidis
- EF Education–Cannondale
- GT Krush Rebellease
- Hess Cycling Team
- Lifeplus Wahoo
- Lotto–Dstny Ladies
- Proximus-Cyclis CT
- Team Coop–Repsol
- VolkerWessels Women Cyclingteam

== Result ==
Result
Rank	Rider	Team	Time
1	Marianne Vos (NED)	Visma–Lease a Bike	2h 35' 02"
2	Lorena Wiebes (NED)	Team SD Worx–Protime	+ 0"
3	Ingvild Gåskjenn (NOR)	Liv AlUla Jayco	+ 0"
4	Pfeiffer Georgi (GBR)	Team dsm–firmenich PostNL	+ 0"
5	Elisa Longo Borghini (ITA)	Lidl–Trek	+ 0"
6	Eleonora Camilla Gasparrini (ITA)	UAE Team ADQ	+ 0"
7	Ashleigh Moolman (RSA)	AG Insurance–Soudal	+ 0"
8	Amber Kraak (NED)	FDJ–Suez	+ 0"
9	Yara Kastelijn (NED)	Fenix–Deceuninck	+ 0"
10	Soraya Paladin (ITA)	Canyon–SRAM	+ 0"
