= 2024 Cadel Evans Great Ocean Road Race (women's race) =

Cycling race

2024 UCI Women's World Tour, race 2 of 27

Race details
- Dates: 27 January 2024
- Stages: 1
- Distance: 140.8 km (87.5 mi)
- Winning time: 3h 53' 31"

Results
	Winner	Rosita Reijnhout (NED)	(Visma–Lease a Bike)
	Second	Dominika Włodarczyk (POL)	(UAE Team ADQ)
	Third	Cecilie Uttrup Ludwig (DEN)	(FDJ–Suez)

The 2024 Cadel Evans Great Ocean Road Race - Elite Women (known as the Deakin University Elite Women's Road Race for sponsorship reasons) was an Australian road cycling one-day race that took place on 27 January. It was the 8th edition of Cadel Evans Great Ocean Road Race and the 2nd event of the 2024 UCI Women's World Tour. It was won by Dutch rider Rosita Reijnhout of Visma–Lease a Bike.

== Teams ==
Sixteen teams took part in the event, including nine UCI Women's WorldTeams, six Women's continental teams and one national team.

UCI Women's WorldTeams

- AG Insurance–Soudal
- Canyon//SRAM
- FDJ–Suez
- Human Powered Health
- Lidl–Trek
- Liv AlUla Jayco
- Team dsm–firmenich PostNL
- Visma–Lease a Bike
- UAE Team ADQ

UCI Women's Continental Teams

- ARA Skip Capital
- Lifeplus Wahoo
- St. Michel–Mavic–Auber93
- Tashkent City Women Professional Cycling Team
- Team Bridgelane WE
- Team Coop–Repsol

National Teams

- Australia

== Result ==
Result
Rank	Rider	Team	Time
1	Rosita Reijnhout (NED)	Visma–Lease a Bike	3h 53' 31"
2	Dominika Włodarczyk (POL)	UAE Team ADQ	+ 0"
3	Cecilie Uttrup Ludwig (DEN)	FDJ–Suez	+ 0"
4	Ruth Edwards (USA)	Human Powered Health	+ 5"
5	Grace Brown (AUS)	FDJ–Suez	+ 5"
6	Francesca Barale (ITA)	Team dsm–firmenich PostNL	+ 5"
7	Victorie Guilman (FRA)	St. Michel–Mavic–Auber93	+ 5"
8	Sarah Roy (AUS)	Australia	+ 5"
9	Kimberley Pienaar (MRI)	AG Insurance–Soudal	+ 5"
10	Alice Towers (GBR)	Canyon//SRAM	+ 5"
