= Alena Ivanchenko =

Russian cyclist (born 2003)

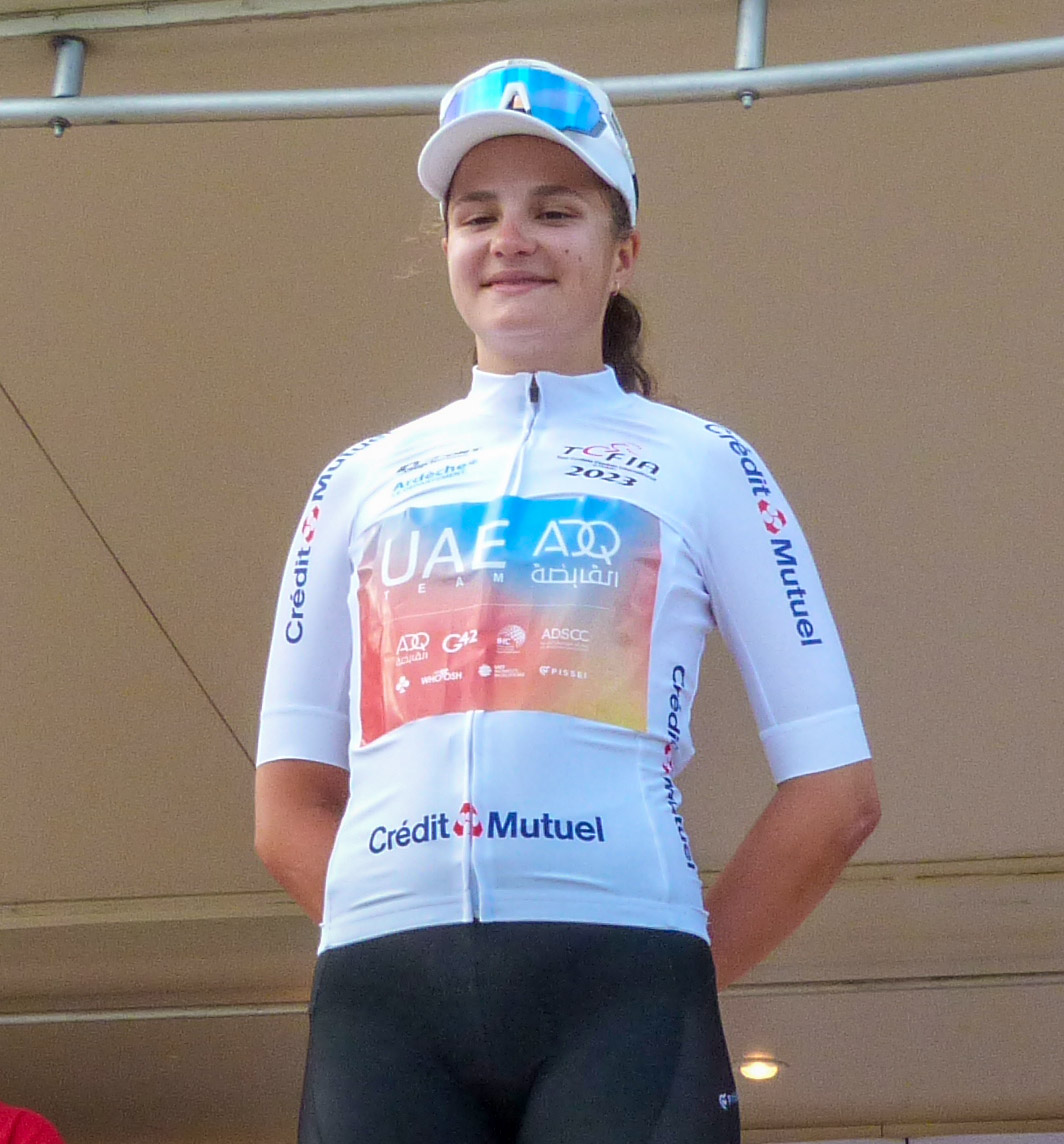
- Ivanchenko wearing the White jersey at Tour Cycliste Féminin International de l'Ardèche

Personal information
- Full name: Alena Ivanchenko
- Born: 16 November 2003 (age 22) Russia
- Height: 1.66 m (5 ft 5 in)

Cycling career
- Sport: Cycling
- Current team: UAE Team L'Imad
- Disciplines: Road; Track
- Role: Rider

Amateur team
- 2021: Lokosphinx

Professional team
- 2022–: UAE Team ADQ
Medal record
Representing Russia
Women's road cycling
World Championships
| Gold medal – first place | 2021 Flanders | Junior time trial |
Women's track cycling
European Under-23 Championships
| Gold medal – first place | 2025 Anadia | Points race |
World Junior Championships
| Gold medal – first place | 2021 Cairo | Points race |
| Gold medal – first place | 2021 Cairo | Madison |
| Gold medal – first place | 2021 Cairo | Team pursuit |
European Junior Championships
| Gold medal – first place | 2021 Apeldoorn | Points race |
| Silver medal – second place | 2021 Apeldoorn | Individual pursuit |
| Silver medal – second place | 2021 Apeldoorn | Team pursuit |

Alena Ivanchenko (born 16 November 2003) is a Russian professional racing cyclist, who rides for the UCI Women's WorldTeam UAE Team L'Imad.

== Career ==
=== Junior successes ===
Ivanchenko won three gold medals at the 2021 UCI Junior Track Cycling World Championships and the right to wear the rainbow jersey in those events for the following year. She won the Points race, Madison and was part of the Russian squad in the Team pursuit.

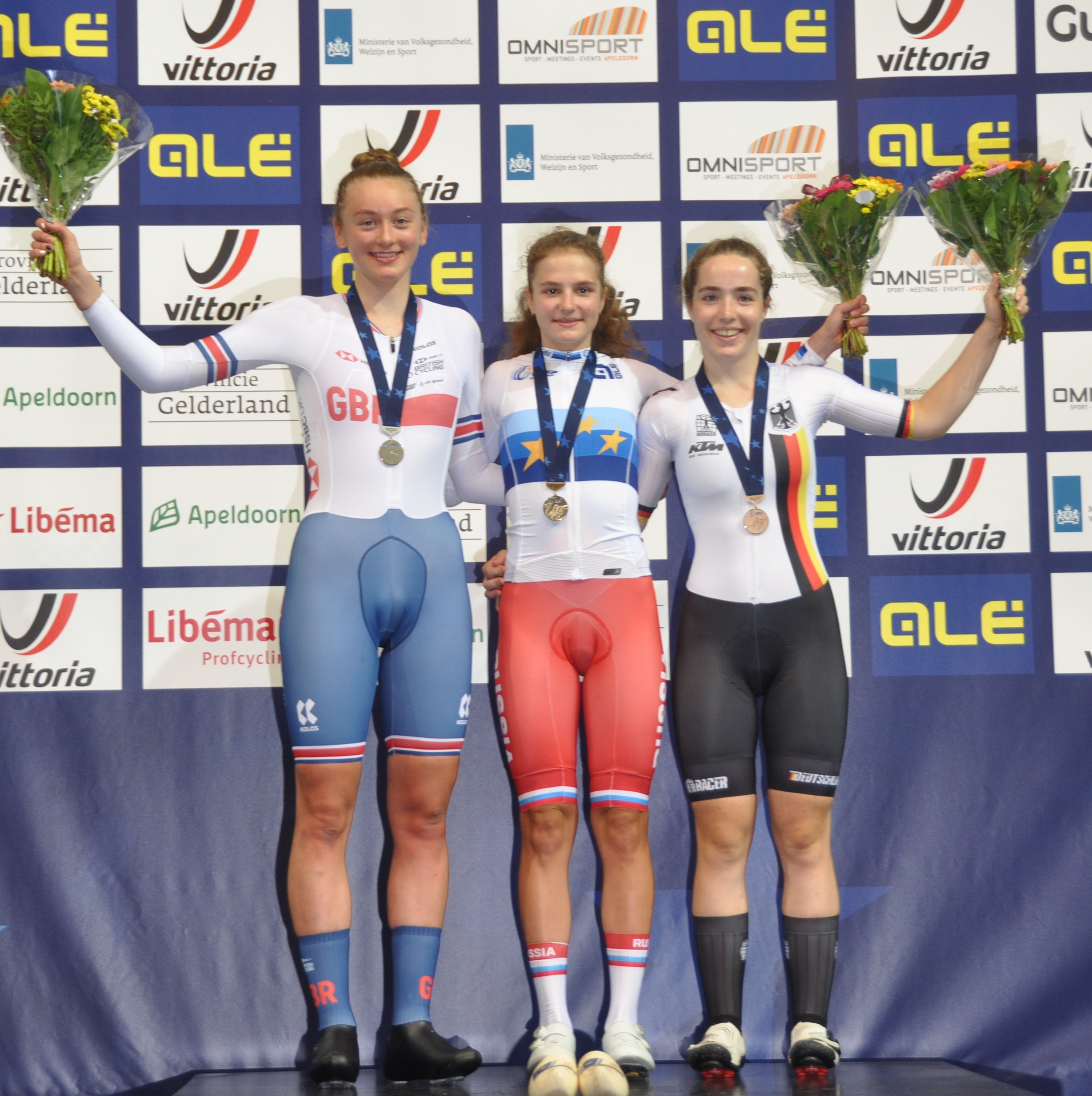
Ivanchenko winning the 2021 European Junior points race

Following the Track championships the European Road Cycling Championships were held where Ivanchenko rode in the Junior time trial and road race. She won the time trial beating German Antonia Niedermaier by 31 seconds.

Later in the year Invanchenko won the Rainbow jersey at the 2021 UCI Road World Championships in the Junior women's time trial beating Zoe Bäckstedt by 10 seconds over the 19.3 km course. During the race she almost crashed into the barriers ending her race but continued to set the best time at each checkpoint.

=== UAE Team ADQ 2022 to present ===
Following her success in 2021, Ivanchenko joined UAE Team ADQ in 2022 when the team moved up to the top division. At the end of 2022 the team confirmed that Ivanchenko would be staying at the team for the 2023 season.

Ivanchenko started her 2023 season at Le Samyn des Dames where she finished in 52. At the Grand Prix Féminin de Chambéry she rode with the UAE Development Team and finished in fifth place 1' 07" down on the winner. In early August she rode the Team pursuit at the Russian Track Championships where her team set a new national record for a 4000m team pursuit. Following her effort in the time trial in Stage 4 of the Tour of Scandinavia Ivanchenko moved into ninth overall and into the lead of the Young riders classification. Ivanchenko finished with the peloton in the final stage securing her first win at UCI Women's World Tour level, the white Young rider classification jersey. The following month at the Tour Cycliste Féminin International de l'Ardèche Ivanchenko finished ninth overall and won the young rider classification

== Major results ==
=== Road ===
2021
1st Time trial, UCI World Junior Championships
1st Time trial, UEC European Junior Championships
1st Grand Prix Velo Alanya
1st Grand Prix Gündogmus
1st Overall Manavgat Side Juniors

1st Stage 2 (ITT)

1st Overall Velo Alanya Juniors

1st Stage 2 (ITT)

2022
1st Stage 3 Bretagne Ladies Tour
7th Trofeo Oro in Euro
2023
5th Grand Prix Féminin de Chambéry
8th Overall Tour of Scandinavia

1st Young rider classification

9th Overall Tour Cycliste Féminin International de l'Ardèche

1st Young rider classification

2025
UCI World Under-23 Championships

5th Time trial
7th Road race

9th Overall Vuelta a Extremadura Femenina

=== Track ===
2020
Junior European Track Championships

1st Individual pursuit
1st Team pursuit

2021
UCI Junior Track Cycling World Championships

1st Points race
1st Madison
1st Team pursuit

1st Points race, Junior European Track Championships
2023
1st National Track cycling championships, Team Pursuit
