= Amalie Lutro =

Norwegian cyclist

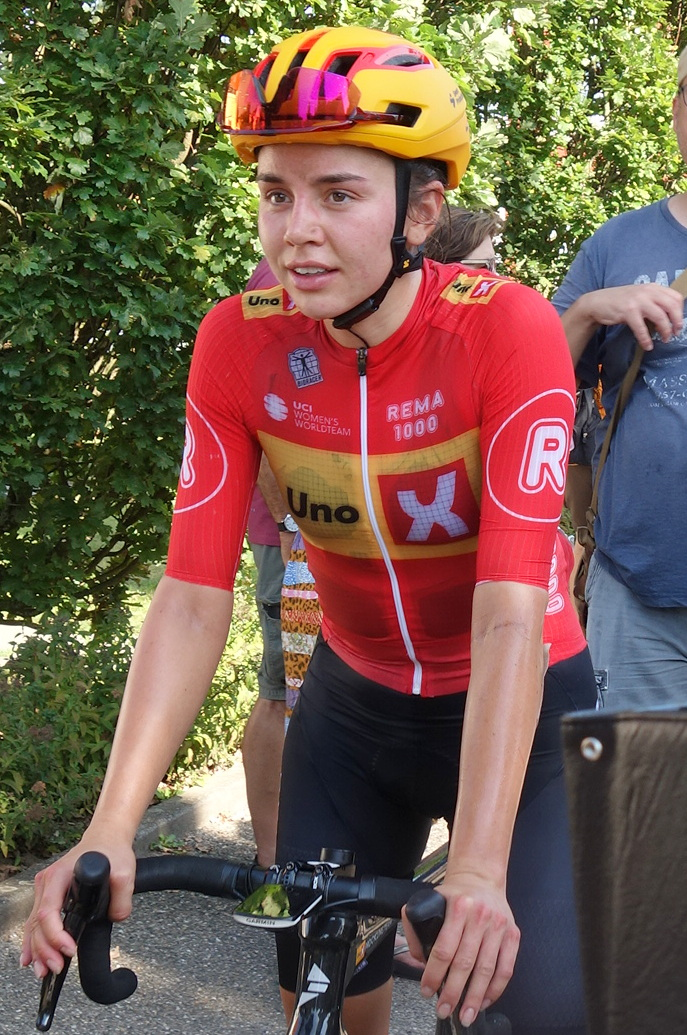
- Lutro at the 2023 Holland Ladies Tour

Personal information
- Full name: Amalie Lutro
- Born: 15 March 2000 (age 26)

Cycling career
- Sport: Cycling
- Current team: Hitec Products–Fluid Control
- Discipline: Road
- Role: Rider

Professional team
- 2019–: Hitec Products–Birk Sport

Amalie Lutro (born 15 March 2000) is a Norwegian professional racing cyclist, who currently rides for UCI Women's Continental Team Hitec Products–Fluid Control.

== Major results ==
2019
1st Stage 5 Rás na mBan
