= 2022 Challenge by La Vuelta =

2022 Ceratizit Challenge by La Vuelta
2022 UCI Women's World Tour, race 22 of 23

Race details
- Dates: 7–11 September 2022
- Stages: 5
- Winning time: 12h 21' 46"

Results
Jersey awarded to the overall winner	Winner	Annemiek van Vleuten (NED)	(Movistar Team)
	Second	Elisa Longo Borghini (ITA)	(Trek–Segafredo)
	Third	Demi Vollering (NED)	(SD Worx)
Jersey awarded to the points classification winner	Points	Silvia Persico (ITA)	(Valcar–Travel & Service)
Jersey awarded to the mountains classification winner	Mountains	Lucinda Brand (NED)	(Trek–Segafredo)
	Team	SD Worx	

The 2022 Ceratizit Challenge by La Vuelta is a women's road cycling stage race that was held in Spain from 7 to 11 September 2022. It was the eighth edition of the Ceratizit Challenge by La Vuelta and was the twenty-second event on the 2022 UCI Women's World Tour calendar. As with previous editions, the final day of the race coincided with the final day of the men's race.

== Teams ==
All fourteen UCI Women's WorldTeams and seven UCI Women's Continental Teams made up the twenty-two teams that participated in the race. Roland Cogeas Edelweiss Squad was the only team not to enter a full squad of six riders. In total, 131 riders started the race.

UCI Women's WorldTeams

- UAE Team ADQ
- Canyon//SRAM
- EF Education–Tibco–SVB
- FDJ Suez Futuroscope
- Human Powered Health
- Liv Racing Xstra
- Movistar Team
- Roland Cogeas Edelweiss Squad
- SD Worx
- Team BikeExchange–Jayco
- Team DSM
- Team Jumbo–Visma
- Trek–Segafredo
- Uno-X Pro Cycling Team

UCI Women's Continental Teams

- Bizkaia–Durango
- Ceratizit–WNT Pro Cycling
- Laboral Kutxa–Fundación Euskadi
- Massi–Tactic
- Río Miera–Cantabria Deporte
- Soltec Team
- Team Coop–Hitec Products
- Valcar–Travel & Service

== Route ==
The 2022 edition increased the number of stages to 5, with the race finishing in Madrid. Ahead of the race, 3 time Giro Donne winner Annemiek van Vleuten criticised the race for not being difficult enough, stating "if you look at the course you can conclude that the Vuelta (sic) is not yet ready to call itself a grand tour".

Stage characteristics and winners
Stage	Date	Course	Distance	Type	Winner
1	7 September	Marina de Cudeyo to Marina de Cudeyo	19.9 km (12.4 mi)	Team time trial	Trek–Segafredo
2	8 September	Colindres de Colindres	105.9 km (65.8 mi)	Mountain stage	Annemiek van Vleuten (NED)
3	9 September	Camargo to Aguilar de Campoo	96.4 km (59.9 mi)	Flat stage	Grace Brown (AUS)
4	10 September	Palencia to Segovia	160 km (99 mi)	Flat stage	Silvia Persico (ITA)
5	11 September	Madrid to Madrid	95.6 km (59.4 mi)	Flat stage	Elisa Balsamo (ITA)
Total		447.8 km (278.3 mi)			

== Stages ==
=== Stage 1 ===
7 September 2022 — Marina de Cudeyo to Marina de Cudeyo, 19.9 km (12.4 mi) (TTT)

Stage 1 result
Rank	Team	Time
1	Trek–Segafredo	23' 31"
2	Team BikeExchange–Jayco	+ 6"
3	FDJ Suez Futuroscope	+ 11"
4	SD Worx	+ 23"
5	Movistar Team	+ 25"
6	Team DSM	+ 44"
7	Canyon//SRAM	+ 59"
8	Team Jumbo–Visma	+ 1' 01"
9	Ceratizit–WNT Pro Cycling	+ 1' 21"
10	UAE Team ADQ	+ 1' 28"

General classification after stage 1
Rank	Rider	Team	Time
1	Elisa Longo Borghini (ITA)	Trek–Segafredo	23' 31"
2	Elynor Backstedt (GBR)	Trek–Segafredo	+ 0"
3	Shirin van Anrooij (NED)	Trek–Segafredo	+ 0"
4	Elisa Balsamo (ITA)	Trek–Segafredo	+ 0"
5	Georgia Williams (NZL)	Team BikeExchange–Jayco	+ 6"
6	Alexandra Manly (AUS)	Team BikeExchange–Jayco	+ 6"
7	Kristen Faulkner (USA)	Team BikeExchange–Jayco	+ 6"
8	Ane Santesteban (ESP)	Team BikeExchange–Jayco	+ 6"
9	Ruby Roseman-Gannon (AUS)	Team BikeExchange–Jayco	+ 6"
10	Grace Brown (AUS)	FDJ Suez Futuroscope	+ 11"

=== Stage 2 ===
8 September 2022 — Colindres to Colindres, 106.5 km (66.2 mi)

Stage 2 Result
Rank	Rider	Team	Time
1	Annemiek van Vleuten (NED)	Movistar Team	2h 56' 30"
2	Elisa Longo Borghini (ITA)	Trek–Segafredo	+ 2' 16"
3	Liane Lippert (GER)	Team DSM	+ 2' 16"
4	Demi Vollering (NED)	SD Worx	+ 2' 16"
5	Cecilie Uttrup Ludwig (DEN)	FDJ Suez Futuroscope	+ 2' 50"
6	Katarzyna Niewiadoma (POL)	Canyon//SRAM	+ 2' 50"
7	Silvia Persico (ITA)	Valcar–Travel & Service	+ 2' 50"
8	Elise Chabbey (SUI)	Canyon//SRAM	+ 2' 50"
9	Juliette Labous (FRA)	Team DSM	+ 2' 50"
10	Anna Shackley (GBR)	SD Worx	+ 2' 50"

General classification after Stage 2
Rank	Rider	Team	Time
1	Annemiek van Vleuten (NED)	Movistar Team	3h 20' 16"
2	Elisa Longo Borghini (ITA)	Trek–Segafredo	+ 1' 55"
3	Demi Vollering (NED)	SD Worx	+ 2' 24"
4	Ane Santesteban (ESP)	Team BikeExchange–Jayco	+ 2' 41"
5	Liane Lippert (GER)	Team DSM	+ 2' 41"
6	Cecilie Uttrup Ludwig (DEN)	FDJ Suez Futuroscope	+ 2' 46"
7	Anna Shackley (GBR)	SD Worx	+ 2' 58"
8	Juliette Labous (FRA)	Team DSM	+ 3' 19"
9	Brodie Chapman (AUS)	FDJ Suez Futuroscope	+ 3' 32"
10	Elise Chabbey (SUI)	Canyon//SRAM	+ 3' 34"

=== Stage 3 ===
9 September 2022 — Camargo to Aguilar de Campoo, 96.4 km (59.9 mi)

Stage 3 Result
Rank	Rider	Team	Time
1	Grace Brown (AUS)	FDJ Suez Futuroscope	2h 28' 37"
2	Elise Chabbey (SUI)	Canyon//SRAM	+ 0"
3	Elisa Balsamo (ITA)	Trek–Segafredo	+ 8"
4	Lotte Kopecky (BEL)	SD Worx	+ 8"
5	Arlenis Sierra (CUB)	Movistar Team	+ 8"
6	Alexandra Manly (AUS)	Team BikeExchange–Jayco	+ 8"
7	Silvia Persico (ITA)	Valcar–Travel & Service	+ 8"
8	Katarzyna Niewiadoma (POL)	Canyon//SRAM	+ 8"
9	Elisa Longo Borghini (ITA)	Trek–Segafredo	+ 8"
10	Annemiek van Vleuten (NED)	Movistar Team	+ 8"

General classification after Stage 3
Rank	Rider	Team	Time
1	Annemiek van Vleuten (NED)	Movistar Team	5h 49' 01"
2	Elisa Longo Borghini (ITA)	Trek–Segafredo	+ 1' 55"
3	Demi Vollering (NED)	SD Worx	+ 2' 24"
4	Ane Santesteban (ESP)	Team BikeExchange–Jayco	+ 2' 41"
5	Liane Lippert (GER)	Team DSM	+ 2' 41"
6	Cecilie Uttrup Ludwig (DEN)	FDJ Suez Futuroscope	+ 2' 46"
7	Anna Shackley (GBR)	SD Worx	+ 2' 58"
8	Juliette Labous (FRA)	Team DSM	+ 3' 19"
9	Elise Chabbey (SUI)	Canyon//SRAM	+ 3' 20"
10	Brodie Chapman (AUS)	FDJ Suez Futuroscope	+ 3' 32"

=== Stage 4 ===
10 September 2022 — Palencia to Segovia, 160.5 km (99.7 mi)

Stage 4 Result
Rank	Rider	Team	Time
1	Silvia Persico (ITA)	Valcar–Travel & Service	4h 11' 01"
2	Demi Vollering (NED)	SD Worx	+ 0"
3	Elisa Longo Borghini (ITA)	Trek–Segafredo	+ 0"
4	Lotte Kopecky (BEL)	SD Worx	+ 0"
5	Liane Lippert (GER)	Team DSM	+ 0"
6	Annemiek van Vleuten (NED)	Movistar Team	+ 0"
7	Cecilie Uttrup Ludwig (DEN)	FDJ Suez Futuroscope	+ 4"
8	Anouska Koster (NED)	Team Jumbo–Visma	+ 6"
9	Katarzyna Niewiadoma (POL)	Canyon//SRAM	+ 11"
10	Mavi García (ESP)	UAE Team ADQ	+ 13"

General classification after Stage 4
Rank	Rider	Team	Time
1	Annemiek van Vleuten (NED)	Movistar Team	10h 00' 02"
2	Elisa Longo Borghini (ITA)	Trek–Segafredo	+ 1' 51"
3	Demi Vollering (NED)	SD Worx	+ 2' 18"
4	Liane Lippert (GER)	Team DSM	+ 2' 41"
5	Cecilie Uttrup Ludwig (DEN)	FDJ Suez Futuroscope	+ 2' 50"
6	Ane Santesteban (ESP)	Team BikeExchange–Jayco	+ 3' 03"
7	Anna Shackley (GBR)	SD Worx	+ 3' 14"
8	Juliette Labous (FRA)	Team DSM	+ 3' 35"
9	Elise Chabbey (SUI)	Canyon//SRAM	+ 3' 36"
10	Katarzyna Niewiadoma (POL)	Canyon//SRAM	+ 3' 45"

=== Stage 5 ===
11 September 2022 — Madrid to Madrid, 96 km (60 mi)

Stage 5 Result
Rank	Rider	Team	Time
1	Elisa Balsamo (ITA)	Trek–Segafredo	2h 21' 37"
2	Lotte Kopecky (BEL)	SD Worx	+ 0"
3	Marta Bastianelli (ITA)	UAE Team ADQ	+ 0"
4	Megan Jastrab (USA)	Team DSM	+ 0"
5	Sofia Bertizzolo (ITA)	UAE Team ADQ	+ 0"
6	Maria Giulia Confalonieri (ITA)	Ceratizit–WNT Pro Cycling	+ 0"
7	Tereza Neumanová (CZE)	Liv Racing Xstra	+ 0"
8	Alexandra Manly (AUS)	Team BikeExchange–Jayco	+ 0"
9	Julie Leth (DEN)	Uno-X Pro Cycling Team	+ 0"
10	Vittoria Guazzini (ITA)	FDJ Suez Futuroscope	+ 0"

General classification after Stage 5
Rank	Rider	Team	Time
1	Annemiek van Vleuten (NED)	Movistar Team	12h 21' 46"
2	Elisa Longo Borghini (ITA)	Trek–Segafredo	+ 1' 44"
3	Demi Vollering (NED)	SD Worx	+ 2' 11"
4	Liane Lippert (GER)	Team DSM	+ 2' 34"
5	Cecilie Uttrup Ludwig (DEN)	FDJ Suez Futuroscope	+ 2' 43"
6	Ane Santesteban (ESP)	Team BikeExchange–Jayco	+ 3' 03"
7	Anna Shackley (GBR)	SD Worx	+ 3' 07"
8	Elise Chabbey (SUI)	Canyon//SRAM	+ 3' 29"
9	Juliette Labous (FRA)	Team DSM	+ 3' 35"
10	Katarzyna Niewiadoma (POL)	Canyon//SRAM	+ 3' 38"

== Classification leadership table ==
Stage	Winner	General classification	Points classification	Mountains classification	Team classification	Combativity award
1	Trek–Segafredo	Elisa Longo Borghini	not awarded	not awarded	Trek–Segafredo	not awarded
2	Annemiek van Vleuten	Annemiek van Vleuten	Annemiek van Vleuten	Lucinda Brand	Canyon//SRAM	Sarah Roy
3	Grace Brown	Annemiek van Vleuten	Annemiek van Vleuten	Lucinda Brand	SD Worx	Mavi García
4	Silvia Persico	Annemiek van Vleuten	Silvia Persico	Lucinda Brand	SD Worx	Anna Kiesenhofer
5	Elisa Balsamo	Annemiek van Vleuten	Silvia Persico	Lucinda Brand	SD Worx	Mavi García
Final		Annemiek van Vleuten	Silvia Persico	Lucinda Brand	SD Worx	not awarded

== Classification standings ==
Legend
Denotes the winner of the general classification	Denotes the winner of the team classification
Denotes the winner of the points classification	Denotes the winner of the combativity award
Denotes the winner of the mountains classification	

=== General classification ===
Final general classification (1–10)
Rank	Rider	Team	Time
1	Annemiek van Vleuten (NED)	Movistar Team	12h 21' 46"
2	Elisa Longo Borghini (ITA)	Trek–Segafredo	+ 1' 44"
3	Demi Vollering (NED)	SD Worx	+ 2' 11"
4	Liane Lippert (GER)	Team DSM	+ 2' 34"
5	Cecilie Uttrup Ludwig (DEN)	FDJ Suez Futuroscope	+ 2' 43"
6	Ane Santesteban (ESP)	Team BikeExchange–Jayco	+ 3' 03"
7	Anna Shackley (GBR)	SD Worx	+ 3' 07"
8	Elise Chabbey (SUI)	Canyon//SRAM	+ 3' 29"
9	Juliette Labous (FRA)	Team DSM	+ 3' 35"
10	Katarzyna Niewiadoma (POL)	Canyon//SRAM	+ 3' 38"

=== Points classification ===
Final points classification (1–10)
Rank	Rider	Team	Points
1	Silvia Persico (ITA)	Valcar–Travel & Service	48
2	Lotte Kopecky (BEL)	SD Worx	48
3	Elisa Longo Borghini (ITA)	Trek–Segafredo	44
4	Elisa Balsamo (ITA)	Trek–Segafredo	41
5	Annemiek van Vleuten (NED)	Movistar Team	41
6	Demi Vollering (NED)	SD Worx	34
7	Liane Lippert (GER)	Team DSM	33
8	Elise Chabbey (SUI)	Canyon//SRAM	32
9	Katarzyna Niewiadoma (POL)	Canyon//SRAM	25
10	Cecilie Uttrup Ludwig (DEN)	FDJ Suez Futuroscope	23

=== Mountains classification ===
Final mountains classification (1–10)
Rank	Rider	Team	Points
1	Lucinda Brand (NED)	Trek–Segafredo	44
2	Annemiek van Vleuten (NED)	Movistar Team	32
3	Sarah Roy (AUS)	Canyon//SRAM	22
4	Liane Lippert (GER)	Team DSM	20
5	Katarzyna Niewiadoma (POL)	Canyon//SRAM	16
6	Elisa Longo Borghini (ITA)	Trek–Segafredo	16
7	Demi Vollering (NED)	SD Worx	15
8	Arlenis Sierra (CUB)	Movistar Team	9
9	Elise Chabbey (SUI)	Canyon//SRAM	7
10	Emma Norsgaard (DEN)	Movistar Team	6

=== Team classification ===
Final team classification (1–10)
Rank	Team	Time
1	SD Worx	36h 27' 46"
2	FDJ Suez Futuroscope	+ 5' 45"
3	Team DSM	+ 6' 09"
4	Canyon//SRAM	+ 6' 38"
5	Team BikeExchange–Jayco	+ 9' 28"
6	Movistar Team	+ 10' 29"
7	Trek–Segafredo	+ 18' 49"
8	UAE Team ADQ	+ 19' 12"
9	Team Jumbo–Visma	+ 31' 48"
10	Valcar–Travel & Service	+ 32' 05"

== See also ==
- 2022 in women's road cycling
