= 2024 Tour of Flanders (women's race) =

Cycling race

2024 Ronde van Vlaanderen Elite Vrouwen
2024 UCI Women's World Tour, race 10 of 27
- Event poster with previous winners Tadej Pogačar and Lotte Kopecky

Race details
- Dates: 31 March 2024
- Stages: 1
- Distance: 163 km (101 mi)
- Winning time: 4h 16' 04"

Results
	Winner	Elisa Longo Borghini (ITA)	(Lidl–Trek)
	Second	Katarzyna Niewiadoma (POL)	(Canyon//SRAM)
	Third	Shirin van Anrooij (NED)	(Lidl–Trek)

The 2024 Ronde van Vlaanderen was a Belgian road cycling one-day race that took place on 31 March. It was the 21st edition of Tour of Flanders for Women and the 10th event of the 2024 UCI Women's World Tour. The race was won by Italian rider Elisa Longo Borghini of Lidl–Trek.

== Teams ==
Fifteen UCI Women's WorldTeams and nine UCI Women's Continental Teams took part in the race.

UCI Women's WorldTeams

- AG Insurance–Soudal
- Canyon//SRAM
- Ceratizit–WNT Pro Cycling
- FDJ–Suez
- Fenix–Deceuninck
- Human Powered Health
- Lidl–Trek
- Liv AlUla Jayco
- Movistar Team
- Roland
- Team dsm–firmenich PostNL
- Team SD Worx–Protime
- UAE Team ADQ
- Uno-X Mobility
- Visma–Lease a Bike

UCI Women's Continental Teams

- Arkéa–B&B Hotels Women
- Chevalmeire
- Cofidis
- EF Education–Cannondale
- Lifeplus Wahoo
- Lotto–Dstny Ladies
- Proximus-Cyclis CT
- Team Coop–Repsol
- VolkerWessels Women Cyclingteam

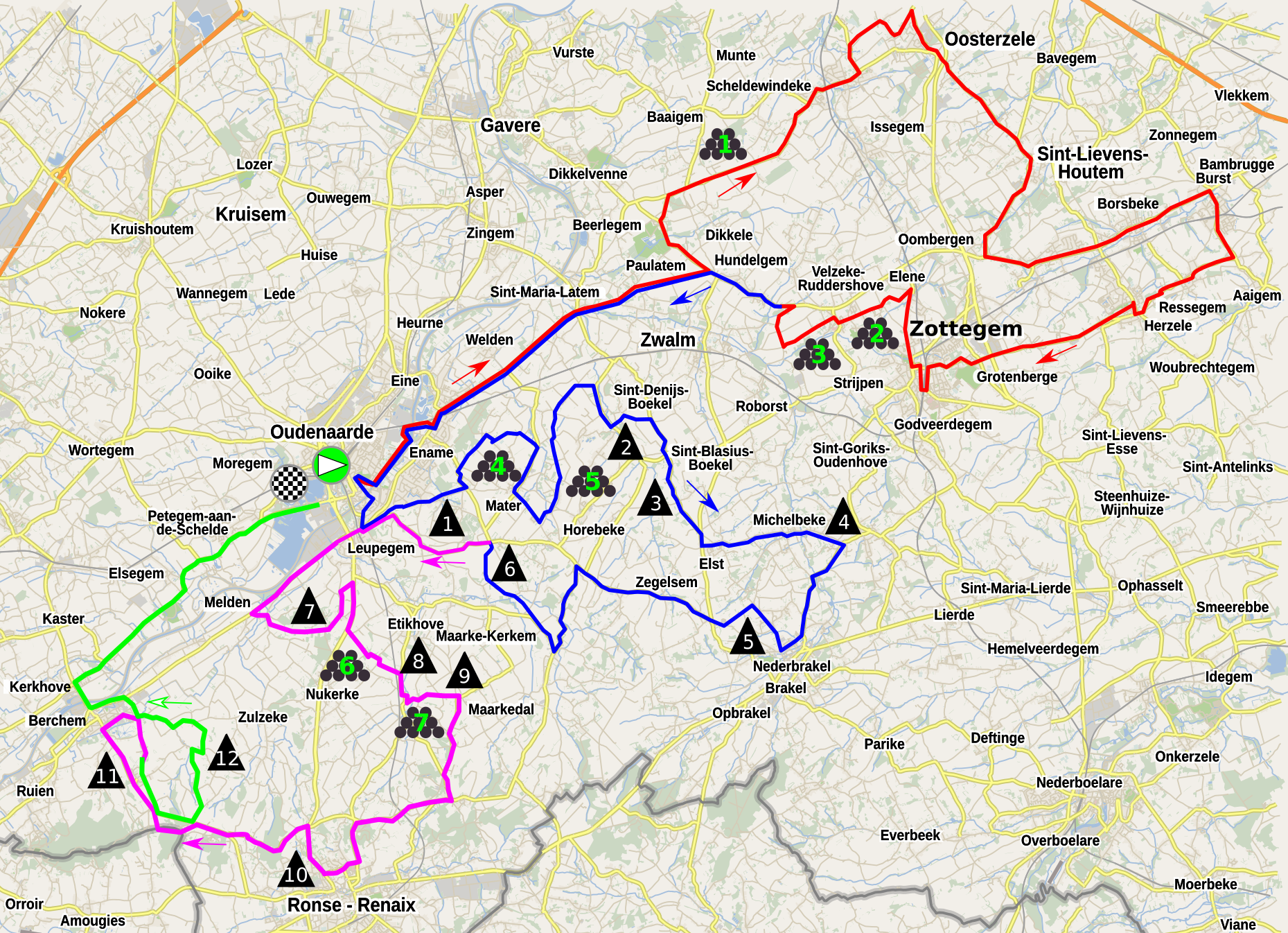
Route of 2024 Ronde van Vlaanderen Elite Vrouwen

== Result ==
Result
Rank	Rider	Team	Time
1	Elisa Longo Borghini (ITA)	Lidl–Trek	4h 16 '04"
2	Katarzyna Niewiadoma (POL)	Canyon//SRAM	+ 0"
3	Shirin van Anrooij (NED)	Lidl–Trek	+ 0"
4	Marianne Vos (NED)	Visma–Lease a Bike	+ 9"
5	Lotte Kopecky (BEL)	Team SD Worx–Protime	+ 9"
6	Puck Pieterse (NED)	Fenix–Deceuninck	+ 9"
7	Silvia Persico (ITA)	UAE Team ADQ	+ 9"
8	Demi Vollering (NED)	Team SD Worx–Protime	+ 15"
9	Letizia Paternoster (ITA)	Liv AlUla Jayco	+ 1' 40"
10	Karlijn Swinkels (NED)	UAE Team ADQ	+ 1' 40"

== See also ==
- 2024 in women's road cycling
