= Giada Borghesi =

Italian cyclist

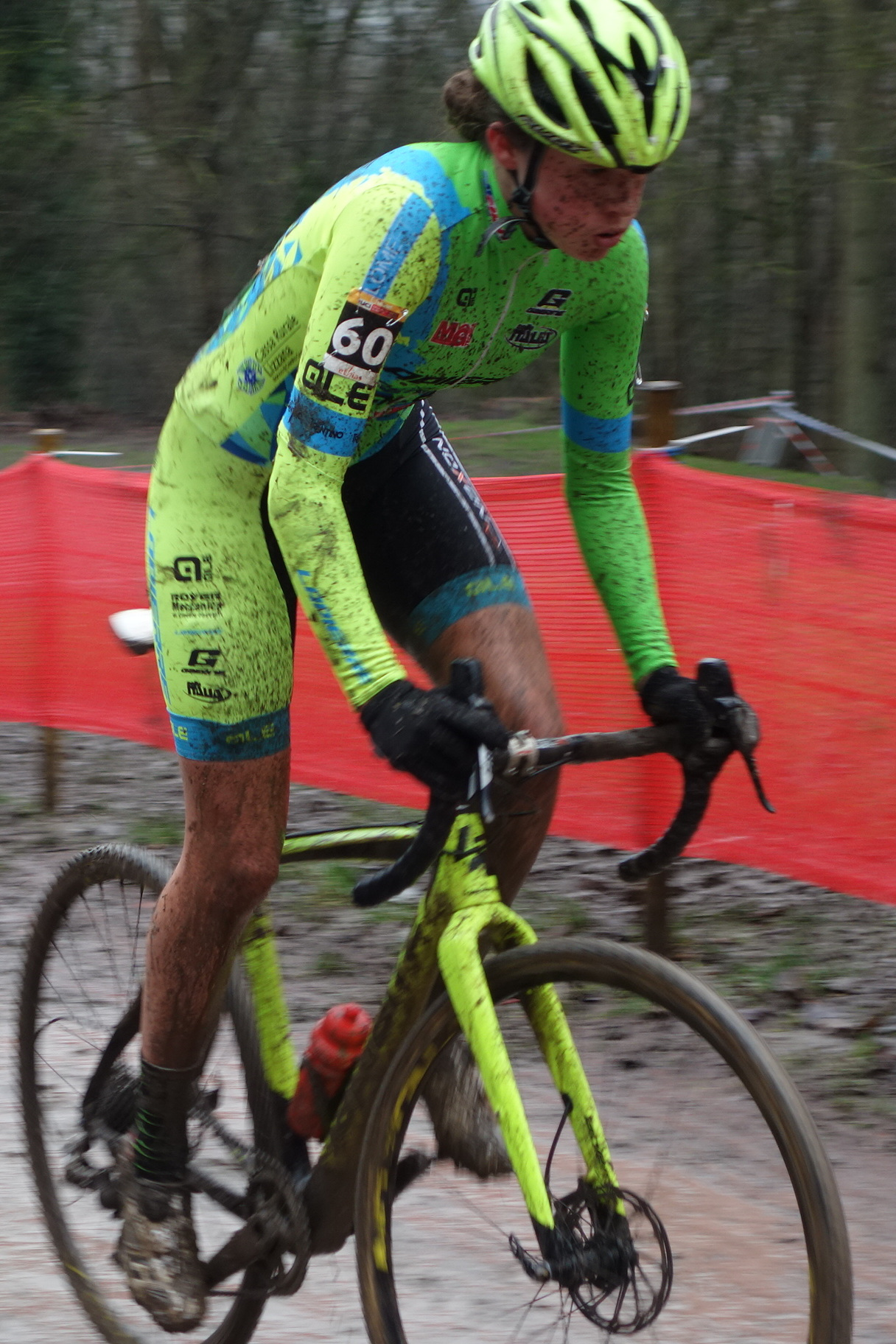
- Borghesi in 2019

Personal information
- Born: 27 November 2002 (age 23) Cles, Italy

Cycling career
- Sport: Cycling
- Current team: Human Powered Health
- Disciplines: Road; Cyclo-cross; Gravel
- Role: Rider

Professional teams
- 2021: Aromitalia–Basso Bikes–Vaiano
- 2024: BTC City Ljubljana Zhiraf Ambedo
- 2024–: Human Powered Health

Giada Borghesi (born 27 November 2002) is an Italian professional racing cyclist, who currently rides for UCI Women's WorldTeam Human Powered Health. Her older sister Letizia is also a professional cyclist.

== Major results ==
=== Road ===
2024
2nd Tour of Guangxi
3rd Overall Giro Mediterraneo Rosa

1st Stage 1

4th La Classique Morbihan
4th Grand Prix Féminin de Chambéry
5th Gran Premio della Liberazione
6th Alpes Grésivaudan Classic
6th Grand Prix du Morbihan Femmes
7th Durango-Durango Emakumeen Saria
2025
9th Grand Prix du Morbihan Féminin

=== Cyclo-cross ===
2023–2024
2nd National Under-23 Championships
3rd Mugello

=== Gravel ===
2023
UCI World Series

5th La Monsterrato

8th European Championships
2024
1st National Championships
1st Wörthersee Gravel Race
