= Amber Kraak =

Dutch cyclist (born 1994)

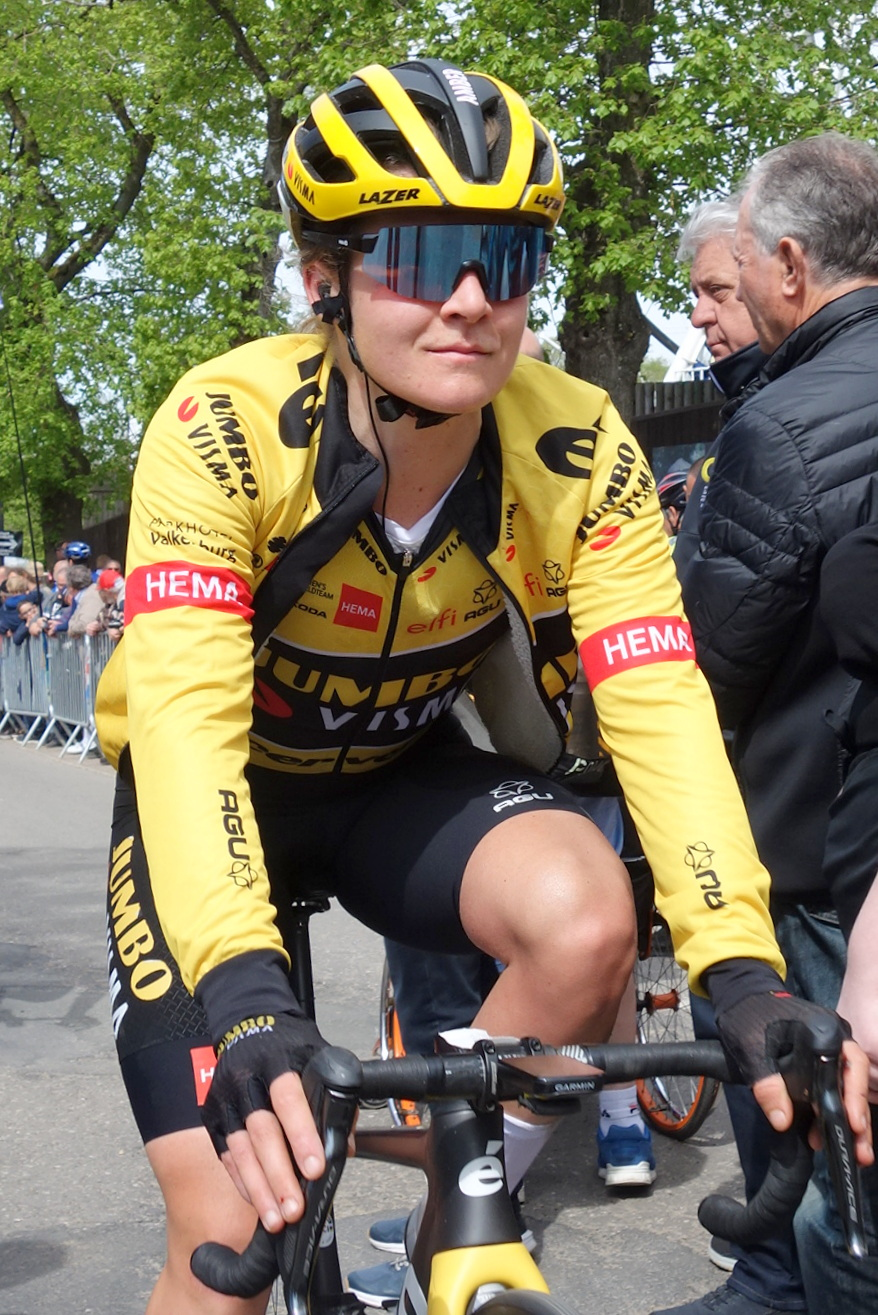
- Kraak in 2022

Personal information
- Born: 29 July 1994 (age 32) Oss, Netherlands
- Height: 1.63 m (5 ft 4 in)
- Weight: 52 kg (115 lb)

Cycling career
- Sport: Cycling
- Current team: FDJ United–Suez
- Discipline: Road
- Role: Rider

Professional teams
- 2021–2023: Team Jumbo–Visma
- 2024–: FDJ–Suez

Amber Kraak (born 29 July 1994) is a Dutch cyclist, who currently rides for UCI Women's WorldTeam FDJ United–Suez.

== Major results ==
2022
1st Mountains classification, Tour of Scandinavia
2nd Classic Lorient Agglomération
2023
1st La Périgord Ladies
1st Stage 1 (TTT) La Vuelta Femenina
3rd Overall Tour of Scandinavia
9th Overall Tour de Suisse
2024
1st Stage 4 UAE Tour
3rd Overall Bretagne Ladies Tour
4th Grand Prix de Wallonie
5th Paris–Roubaix
6th Brabantse Pijl
8th Amstel Gold Race
8th Alpes Gresivaudan Classic
8th Overall Thüringen Ladies Tour
2025
8th Le Samyn
2026
10th Cadel Evans Great Ocean Road Race
