= Sandra Alonso =

Spanish cyclist (born 1998)

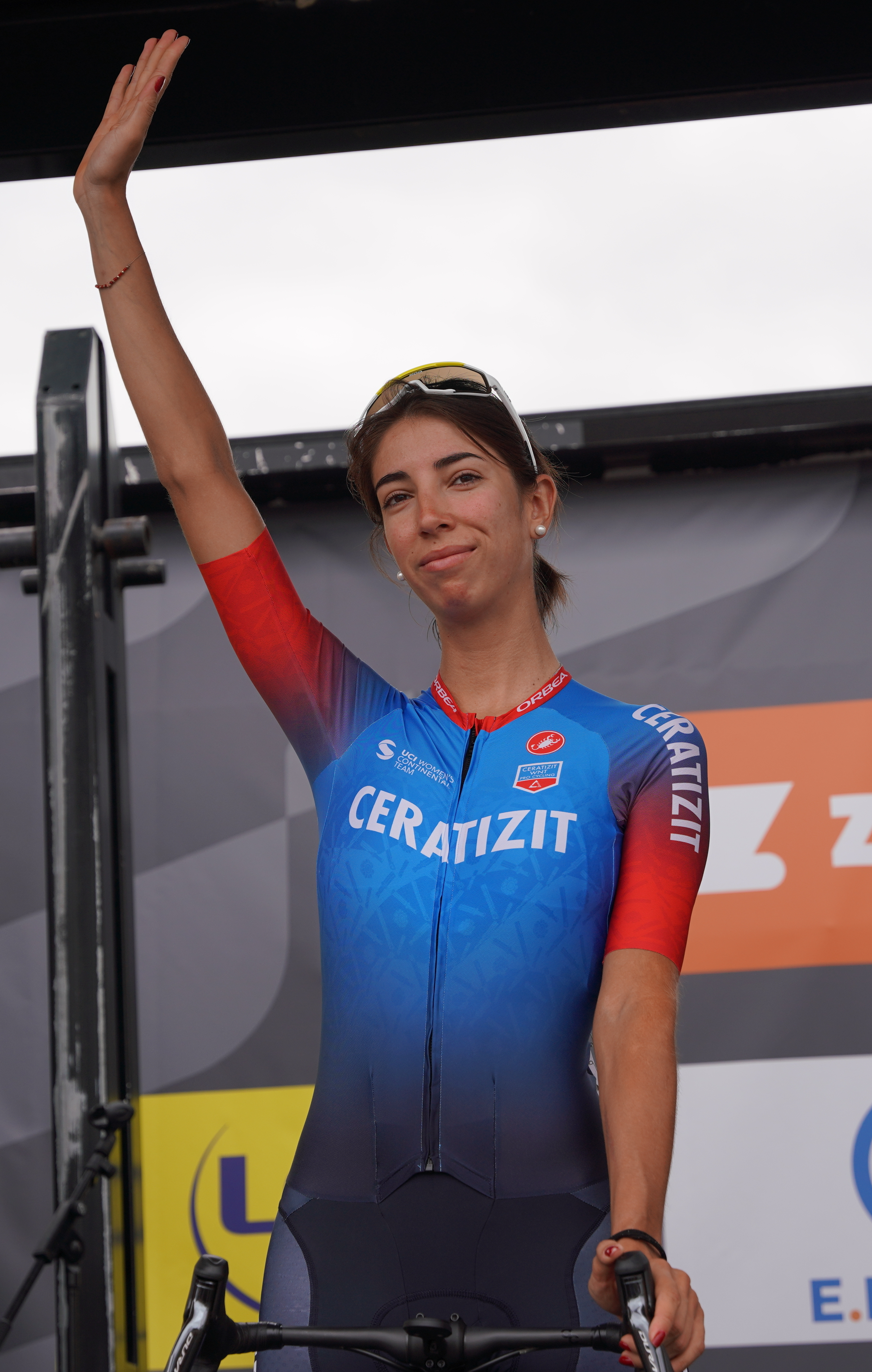

Personal information
- Full name: Sandra Alonso Domínguez
- Born: 19 August 1998 (age 28) Mexico

Cycling career
- Sport: Cycling
- Current team: Ceratizit Pro Cycling
- Discipline: Road
- Role: Rider

Amateur teams
- 2017: Bioracer–Elkar Kirolak
- 2020: Casa Dorada Women Cycling

Professional teams
- 2018–2019: Bizkaia Durango–Euskadi Murias
- 2020: Cronos–Casa Dorada
- 2021: Bizkaia–Durango
- 2022–: Ceratizit–WNT Pro Cycling
Medal record
Women's road cycling
Representing Spain
Mediterranean Games
Silver medal – second place	2026 Taranto	Time trial
Bronze medal – third place	2022 Oran	Road race

Sandra Alonso Domínguez (born 19 August 1998) is a Spanish racing cyclist, who currently rides for UCI Women's WorldTeam Ceratizit Pro Cycling.

== Major results ==
=== Road ===
2015
3rd Road race, National Junior Championships
2016
1st Torneo Euskadun junior
2nd Larrabasterra, Sopela
5th Vuelta a Valencia
8th Road race, UCI World Junior Championships
2017
4th Gran Premio comunidad de Cantabria / Trofeo villa de Noja
5th Larrabasterra, Sopela
2018
2nd Copa Espana
2nd Gran Premio comunidad de Cantabria / Trofeo villa de Noja
3rd Trofeo Ayto de Egües, Elcano
4th Trofeo ciudad de Caspe, Zaragoza
5th Gran Premio La Burundesa Sari Nagusia, Sarriguren
2019
1st Trofeo Gobierno de la Rioja, Entrena
2nd Gran Premio comunidad de Cantabria / Trofeo villa de Noja
2nd Estella, Lizarra
3rd Ciudad de Dos Hermanas, Sevilla
4th Trofeo Ayto de Egües, Elcano
9th Time trial, National Under–23 Championships
2020
1st Campeonato de Euskadi en Segura, Guipúzcoa
1st Premio Ayto Sopelana
1st Karmen Saria, Txirrindulariak
1st Challenge Murcia / Circuito Carthagena
1st stage 1 Challenge Murcia / Circuito Carthagena
3rd stage 2 Challenge Murcia / Circuito Carthagena
6th Time trial, National Championships
2021
1st Stage 2 Setmana Ciclista Valenciana
1st Classica de l'Arros / Sueca
2nd Barrundia Udalaren Saria
5th Stage 2 Vuelta a Burgos Feminas
6th Vuelta a la Comunitat Valenciana Feminas
8th Scheldeprijs
2022
National Championships

2nd Road race
3rd Time trial

3rd Road race, Mediterranean Games
5th Vuelta a la Comunitat Valenciana Feminas
10th Paris–Roubaix
10th Ronde de Mouscron
2023
National Championships

3rd Time trial
5th Road race

5th Women Cycling Pro Costa De Almería
2024
1st Tour of Guangxi
1st Stage 2 Tour de Normandie Féminin
1st Stage 6 Thüringen Ladies Tour
National Championships

2nd Time trial
7th Road race

=== Track ===
2017
1st National Championships, individual pursuit
2018
2nd National Championships, individual pursuit
2019
1st National Championships, individual pursuit
3rd National Championships, points race
3rd National Championships, 500 m
3rd National Championships, Madison
