= Ingvild Gåskjenn =

Norwegian cyclist (born 1998)

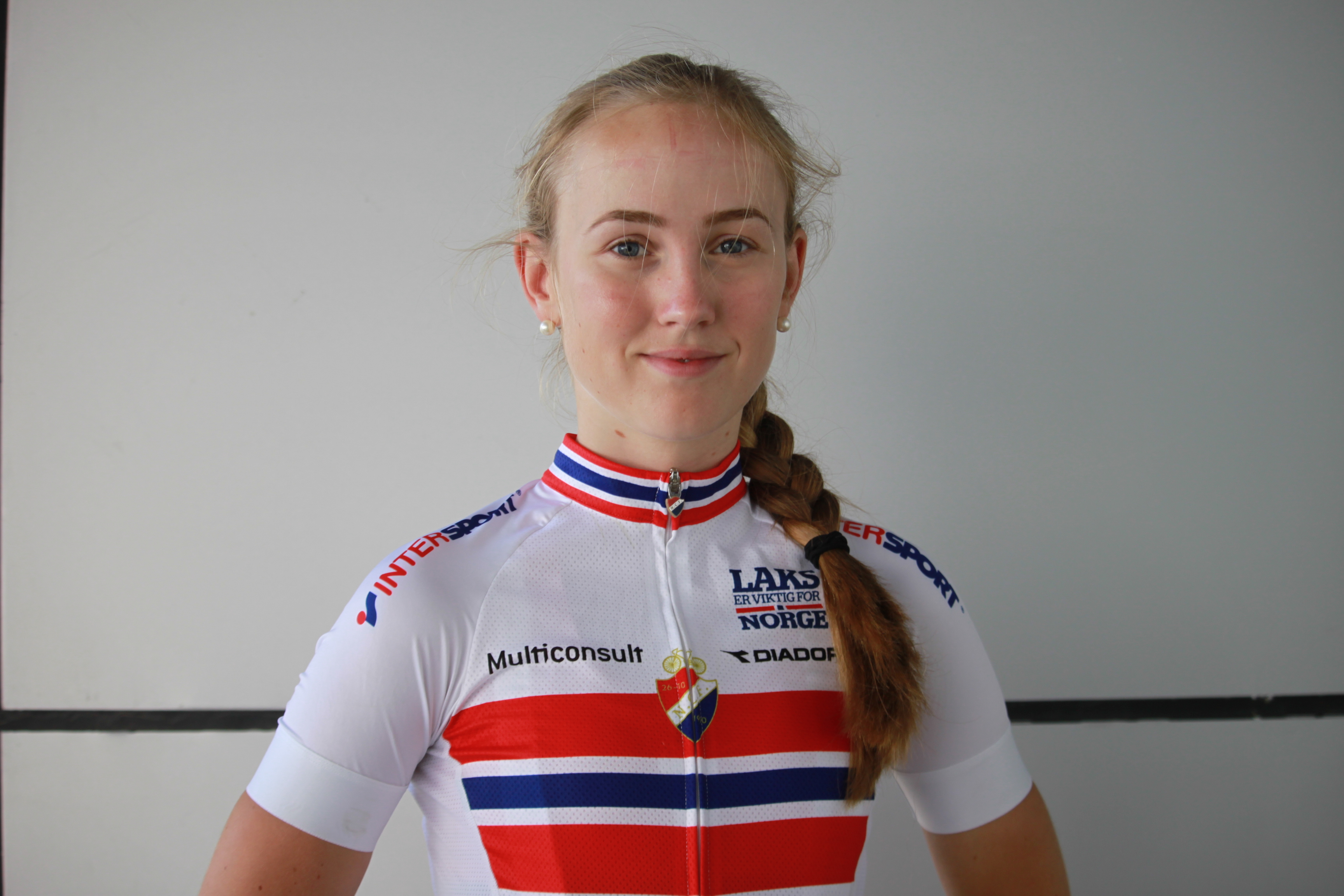
- Gåskjenn in 2016

Personal information
- Full name: Ingvild Gåskjenn
- Born: 1 July 1998 (age 28) Horten, Norway

Cycling career
- Sport: Cycling
- Current team: Uno-X Mobility
- Discipline: Road
- Role: Rider

Professional teams
- 2017–2022: Team Hitec Products
- 2023–2024: Liv AlUla Jayco
- 2025–: Uno-X Mobility

Ingvild Gåskjenn (born 1 July 1998) is a Norwegian professional racing cyclist, who currently rides for UCI Women's WorldTour Team Uno-X Mobility.

== Major results ==
2015
1st Road race, National Junior Road Championships
2016
National Junior Road Championships

2nd Road race
2nd Time trial

2018
5th Road race, National Road Championships
2019
3rd Road race, National Road Championships
3rd Overall Kreiz Breizh Elites Dames
6th Road race, UEC European Under-23 Road Championships
7th Overall Tour de Feminin
2021
3rd Road race, National Road Championships
8th Overall Kreiz Breizh Elites Dames
2022
9th Overall Tour of Uppsala
2024
3rd Amstel Gold Race
