= 2021 UCI Women's World Tour =

Series of women's road cycling races

- Sixth edition of the UCI Women's World Tour

Details
- Dates: 6 March – 23 October 2021
- Location: Europe
- Races: 18

Champions
- Individual champion: Annemiek van Vleuten (Netherlands) (Movistar Team)
- Teams' champion: SD Worx

The 2021 UCI Women's World Tour was a competition that included eighteen road cycling events throughout the 2021 women's cycling season. It was the sixth edition of the UCI Women's World Tour, the ranking system launched by the Union Cycliste Internationale (UCI) in 2016. The competition began with Strade Bianche on 6 March, and finished with the Ronde van Drenthe on 23 October.

Dutch rider Annemiek van Vleuten (Movistar Team) became the first rider to win the individual classification for a second time, taking a season-high four overall victories during the season, finishing the season with a tally of 3177 points. Second place went to another Dutch rider, as Demi Vollering (SD Worx) finished on 2563 points, having taken three overall victories in 2021, while third place on 2509 points, was two-time winner Elisa Longo Borghini of Italy, riding for Trek–Segafredo. A total of nine riders won races during the season, while the individual classification lead changed eight times between van Vleuten, Vollering, Longo Borghini, Marianne Vos (Team Jumbo–Visma) and Chantal van den Broek-Blaak (SD Worx).

The youth classification was closely-contested with just two points separating the top two riders in the classification. Honours went to Niamh Fisher-Black from New Zealand of the SD Worx team with 34 points and four victories, ahead of French rider Évita Muzic, who also won four races for FDJ Nouvelle-Aquitaine Futuroscope. Third place in the standings went to Russia's Maria Novolodskaya (A.R. Monex), who scored 22 points and one win. A total of eight riders won races during the season, with the classification lead changing six times between Fisher-Black, Muzic, Novolodskaya, Sarah Gigante (Tibco–Silicon Valley Bank) and Emma Norsgaard Jørgensen (Movistar Team). The teams classification was led from start to finish by SD Worx for their fifth win in six seasons – their first under the SD Worx name – finishing more than 3000 points clear over their closest rivals, Trek–Segafredo; SD Worx took seven wins during the season, including four consecutive race wins earned by Vollering and Anna van der Breggen between La Flèche Wallonne and La Course by Le Tour de France.

== Events ==
The race calendar for the 2021 season was announced in July 2020, with twenty-five races initially scheduled – up from twenty-one that were scheduled to be held in 2020. Two Spanish races – the Itzulia Women and the Vuelta a Burgos Feminas – were scheduled to be part of the calendar for the first time. Paris–Roubaix, which featured on the revised 2020 schedule after the suspension of racing due to the COVID-19 pandemic, also returned to the calendar, as did the RideLondon Classique after a year's absence. In September 2020, the Giro d'Italia Femminile was relegated to the 2021 UCI Women's ProSeries, being downgraded to 2.Pro status.

On 1 November 2020, La Course by Le Tour de France was moved forward three weeks from 18 July to 27 June; this was as a result of the route being contested on the second day of the 2021 Tour de France, finishing at the Mûr-de-Bretagne. On 22 February 2021, following the cancellation of the Itzulia Women stage race, race organisers OCETA announced their intention to hold the Donostia San Sebastián Klasikoa at World Tour level, on 31 July. La Course by Le Tour de France was moved forward a further day in April 2021 to 26 June, due to departmental elections to be held in Côtes-d'Armor, and consisted of a route utilising part of the opening stage of the men's race. In July, the Madrid Challenge by La Vuelta was extended from three stages to four, finishing in Santiago de Compostela on the same day as the final stage of the Vuelta a España.

2021 UCI Women's World Tour
Race	Date	First	Second	Third	Leader
(Italy) Strade Bianche	6 March	Chantal van den Broek-Blaak (NED)	Elisa Longo Borghini (ITA)	Anna van der Breggen (NED)	Chantal van den Broek-Blaak (NED)
(Italy) Trofeo Alfredo Binda-Comune di Cittiglio	21 March	Elisa Longo Borghini (ITA)	Marianne Vos (NED)	Cecilie Uttrup Ludwig (DEN)	Elisa Longo Borghini (ITA)
(Belgium) Classic Brugge–De Panne	25 March	Grace Brown (AUS)	Emma Norsgaard Jørgensen (DEN)	Jolien D'Hoore (BEL)	Elisa Longo Borghini (ITA)
(Belgium) Gent–Wevelgem	28 March	Marianne Vos (NED)	Lotte Kopecky (BEL)	Lisa Brennauer (GER)	Marianne Vos (NED)
(Belgium) Tour of Flanders	4 April	Annemiek van Vleuten (NED)	Lisa Brennauer (GER)	Grace Brown (AUS)	Elisa Longo Borghini (ITA)
(Netherlands) Amstel Gold Race	18 April	Marianne Vos (NED)	Demi Vollering (NED)	Annemiek van Vleuten (NED)	Marianne Vos (NED)
(Belgium) La Flèche Wallonne	21 April	Anna van der Breggen (NED)	Katarzyna Niewiadoma (POL)	Elisa Longo Borghini (ITA)	Marianne Vos (NED)
(Belgium) Liège–Bastogne–Liège	25 April	Demi Vollering (NED)	Annemiek van Vleuten (NED)	Elisa Longo Borghini (ITA)	Elisa Longo Borghini (ITA)
(Spain) Vuelta a Burgos Feminas	20–23 May	Anna van der Breggen (NED)	Annemiek van Vleuten (NED)	Demi Vollering (NED)	Annemiek van Vleuten (NED)
La Course by Le Tour de France	26 June	Demi Vollering (NED)	Cecilie Uttrup Ludwig (DEN)	Marianne Vos (NED)	Demi Vollering (NED)
(Spain) Donostia San Sebastián Klasikoa	31 July	Annemiek van Vleuten (NED)	Ruth Winder (USA)	Tatiana Guderzo (ITA)	Annemiek van Vleuten (NED)
Ladies Tour of Norway	12–15 August	Annemiek van Vleuten (NED)	Ashleigh Moolman (RSA)	Kristen Faulkner (USA)	Annemiek van Vleuten (NED)
(Netherlands) Simac Ladies Tour	24–29 August	Chantal van den Broek-Blaak (NED)	Marlen Reusser (SUI)	Ellen van Dijk (NED)	Annemiek van Vleuten (NED)
(France) GP de Plouay–Lorient–Agglomération Trophée Ceratizit	30 August	Elisa Longo Borghini (ITA)	Gladys Verhulst (FRA)	Kristen Faulkner (USA)	Annemiek van Vleuten (NED)
(Spain) Ceratizit Challenge by La Vuelta	2–5 September	Annemiek van Vleuten (NED)	Marlen Reusser (SUI)	Elise Chabbey (SUI)	Annemiek van Vleuten (NED)
(France) Paris–Roubaix	2 October (Note: Paris–Roubaix was scheduled for 11 April, but was postponed due to the COVID-19 pandemic in France.)	Lizzie Deignan (GBR)	Marianne Vos (NED)	Elisa Longo Borghini (ITA)	Annemiek van Vleuten (NED)
(United Kingdom) The Women's Tour	4–9 October (Note: The Women's Tour was initially scheduled for 7–12 June, but organisers requested a date change to 4–9 October due to the COVID-19 pandemic in the United Kingdom. These dates were confirmed on 18 March 2021, following an updated calendar released by the Union Cycliste Internationale (UCI).)	Demi Vollering (NED)	Juliette Labous (FRA)	Clara Copponi (FRA)	Annemiek van Vleuten (NED)
(Netherlands) Ronde van Drenthe	23 October (Note: The Ronde van Drenthe was initially scheduled for 14 March, but organisers requested a date change to October due to the COVID-19 pandemic in the Netherlands. On 18 March 2021, the race was confirmed for 23 October, following an updated calendar released by the Union Cycliste Internationale (UCI).)	Lorena Wiebes (NED)	Elena Cecchini (ITA)	Eleonora Gasparrini (ITA)	Annemiek van Vleuten (NED)

=== Cancelled and postponed events ===
On 1 November 2020, the season-opening Cadel Evans Great Ocean Road Race was cancelled due to quarantine and border restriction issues attributed to the COVID-19 pandemic. The organisers of the Ronde van Drenthe announced that they had applied to the Union Cycliste Internationale (UCI) to move the race from the assigned date of 14 March to the last weekend of October. In January 2021, both the Itzulia Women and the RideLondon Classique were cancelled as a consequence of the COVID-19 pandemic. The following month, The Women's Tour was postponed from its initial June dates due to the COVID-19 pandemic, requesting a date change to October. In March, the Tour of Chongming Island was postponed from its scheduled dates in May. On 18 March 2021, it was confirmed that The Women's Tour, the Tour of Chongming Island and the Ronde van Drenthe would all be held in October. On 1 April 2021, Paris–Roubaix was postponed to 2 October, following a surge in cases due to the COVID-19 pandemic in France. In May, the Open de Suède Vårgårda races were cancelled due to financial issues associated with the COVID-19 pandemic in Sweden. In August, the Tour of Chongming Island and the Tour of Guangxi were both cancelled at the request of their respective organisers, due to the COVID-19 pandemic.

== Points standings ==
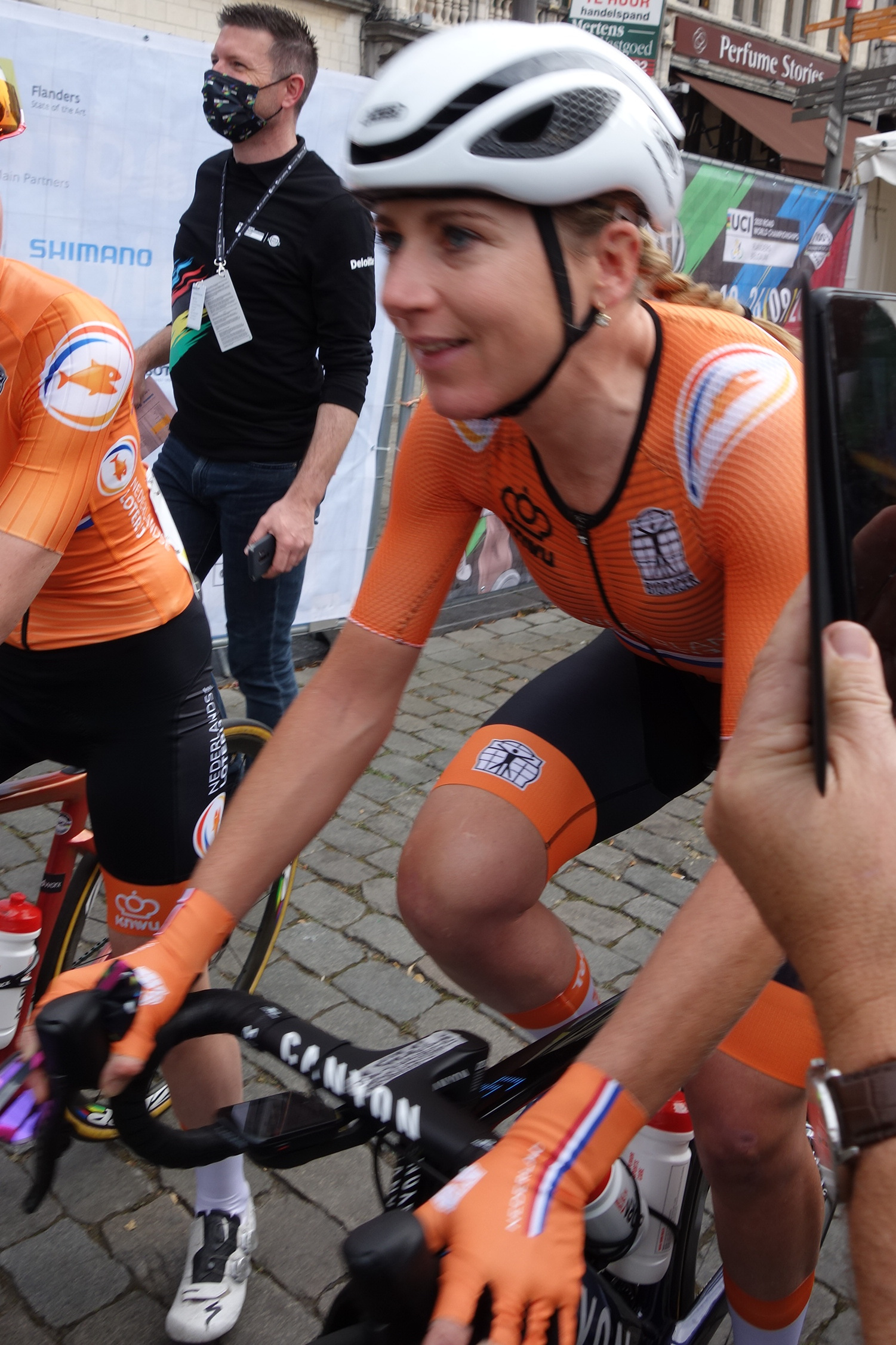
Annemiek van Vleuten (pictured at the 2021 UCI Road World Championships) won the overall classification

For the 2021 season, the point-scoring system introduced in 2020 by the Union Cycliste Internationale remained in place.

=== Individual ===
Riders tied with the same number of points were classified by number of victories, then number of second places, third places, and so on, in World Tour events and stages.

Individual rankings
Rank	Name	Team	Points
1	Annemiek van Vleuten (NED)	Movistar Team	3177
2	Demi Vollering (NED)	SD Worx	2563
3	Elisa Longo Borghini (ITA)	Trek–Segafredo	2509
4	Marianne Vos (NED)	Team Jumbo–Visma	2477
5	Cecilie Uttrup Ludwig (DEN)	FDJ Nouvelle-Aquitaine Futuroscope	1692
6	Anna van der Breggen (NED)	SD Worx	1640
7	Katarzyna Niewiadoma (POL)	Canyon//SRAM	1463
8	Marlen Reusser (SUI)	Alé BTC Ljubljana	1275
9	Chantal van den Broek-Blaak (NED)	SD Worx	1099
10	Grace Brown (AUS)	Team BikeExchange	1066
11	Elise Chabbey (SUI)	Canyon//SRAM	946
12	Kristen Faulkner (USA)	Tibco–Silicon Valley Bank	923
13	Ashleigh Moolman (RSA)	SD Worx	911
14	Lisa Brennauer (GER)	Ceratizit–WNT Pro Cycling	824
15	Elisa Balsamo (ITA)	Valcar–Travel & Service	779
16	Lotte Kopecky (BEL)	Team BikeExchange	721
17	Lizzie Deignan (GBR)	Trek–Segafredo	696
18	Juliette Labous (FRA)	Team DSM	692
19	Marta Cavalli (ITA)	FDJ Nouvelle-Aquitaine Futuroscope	692
20	Soraya Paladin (ITA)	Team BikeExchange	690
202 riders scored points

=== Youth ===
The top three riders in the final results of each World Tour event's young rider classification received points towards the standings. Six points were awarded to first place, four points to second place and two points to third place.

Youth rankings
Rank	Name	Team	Points
1	Niamh Fisher-Black (NZL)	SD Worx	34
2	Évita Muzic (FRA)	FDJ Nouvelle-Aquitaine Futuroscope	32
3	Maria Novolodskaya (RUS)	A.R. Monex	22
4	Pfeiffer Georgi (GBR)	Team DSM	12
5	Lorena Wiebes (NED)	Team DSM	10
6	Anna Shackley (GBR)	SD Worx	10
7	Franziska Koch (GER)	Team DSM	8
8	Clara Copponi (FRA)	FDJ Nouvelle-Aquitaine Futuroscope	6
9	Kata Blanka Vas (HUN)	SD Worx	6
10	Sarah Gigante (AUS)	Tibco–Silicon Valley Bank	6
11	Vittoria Guazzini (ITA)	Valcar–Travel & Service	6
12	Emma Norsgaard Jørgensen (DEN)	Movistar Team	5
13	Eleonora Gasparrini (ITA)	Valcar–Travel & Service	4
14	Abi Smith (GBR)	Tibco–Silicon Valley Bank	4
15	Marta Jaskulska (POL)	Liv Racing	4
16	Barbara Malcotti (ITA)	Valcar–Travel & Service	4
17	Shirin van Anrooij (NED)	Trek–Segafredo	4
18	Julia van Bokhoven (NED)	Parkhotel Valkenburg	4
19	Maria Martins (POR)	Drops–Le Col	2
20	India Grangier (FRA)	Stade Rochelais Charente-Maritime	2
23 riders scored points

=== Team ===
Team rankings were calculated by adding the ranking points of all the riders of a team in the table.

Rank	Team	Points	Scoring riders
1	SD Worx	8580 (Note: Credited with 8572 points by the UCI; eight race leader points missing from Chantal van den Broek-Blaak's points tally from the Holland Ladies Tour.)	13 riders Vollering (2563), van der Breggen (1640), van den Broek-Blaak (1099), (Note: Credited with 1091 points by the UCI; eight race leader points from the Holland Ladies Tour missing from van den Broek-Blaak's tally.) Moolman (911), (Note: Moolman was given a fifteen-point sanction, as per Article 2.12.007 of the UCI road racing regulations.) Pieters (687), Cecchini (435), Fisher-Black (348), D'Hoore (260), Majerus (191), Shackley (176), Vas (123), Uneken (121), Fournier (26)
2	Trek–Segafredo	5247 (Note: Credited with 5263 points by the UCI; 27th place finish at Classic Brugge–De Panne credited to Ruth Winder, instead of Kelly Van den Steen.)	11 riders Longo Borghini (2509), Deignan (696), van Dijk (528), (Note: Van Dijk was given a 50-point sanction, as per Article 2.12.007 of the UCI road racing regulations.) Winder (472), (Note: Credited with 488 points by the UCI; 27th place finish at Classic Brugge–De Panne credited to Winder, instead of Kelly Van den Steen.) Hosking (327), Cordon-Ragot (273), Brand (237), (Note: Brand was given a fifteen-point sanction, as per Article 2.12.007 of the UCI road racing regulations.) Hanson (64), Dideriksen (61), Wiles (40), van Anrooij (40)
3	Movistar Team	5043	12 riders Van Vleuten (3177), Norsgaard (568), (Note: Norsgaard was given a fifteen-point sanction, as per Article 2.12.007 of the UCI road racing regulations.) Thomas (356), Aalerud (330), Biannic (262), S. Gutiérrez (163), Erić (74), Guarischi (34), Martín (32), A. González (23), Oyarbide (16), Patiño (8)
4	FDJ Nouvelle-Aquitaine Futuroscope	3957	12 riders Uttrup Ludwig (1692), Cavalli (692), Muzic (496), Copponi (384), Fahlin (220), Chapman (196), Duval (111), Borgli (40), Grossetête (40), Le Net (38), Guilman (32), Wiel (16)
5	Team DSM	3684	10 riders Labous (692), Wiebes (630), Mackaij (502), Georgi (482), Lippert (441), Labecki (277), (Note: Labecki was given a fifteen-point sanction, as per Article 2.12.007 of the UCI road racing regulations.) Koch (256), Andersen (212), Kirchmann (176), Jastrab (16)
6	Canyon//SRAM	3388	12 riders Niewiadoma (1463), Chabbey (946), A. Barnes (419), Harvey (128), H. Barnes (100), Cromwell (88), Harris (86), Klein (59), Amialiusik (48), Ryan (24), Ludwig (16), Shapira (11) (Note: Shapira was given a five-point sanction, as per Article 2.12.007 of the UCI road racing regulations.)
7	Alé BTC Ljubljana	3364	Reusser (1275), García (644), Bastianelli (610), Guderzo (388), Bujak (196), Pintar (88), Chursina (74), Boogaard (55), Tomasi (34)
8	Team Jumbo–Visma	3319	10 riders Vos (2477), R. Markus (316), Henderson (204), A. Koster (110), Kasper (84), Beekhuis (48), K. Swinkels (32), Kraak (24), van der Burg (16), Van de Velde (8)
9	Liv Racing	3226	Kopecky (721), Paladin (690), Bertizzolo (539), Rooijakkers (404), Jackson (339), Stultiens (281), (Note: Stultiens was given a fifteen-point sanction, as per Article 2.12.007 of the UCI road racing regulations.) Korevaar (196), Jaskulska (48), Demey (8)
10	Team BikeExchange	2267	Brown (1066), Spratt (510), Roy (307), Santesteban (152), Ensing (136), Kennedy (72), Žigart (16), Campbell (8)
11	Valcar–Travel & Service	1583	12 riders Balsamo (779), Gasparrini (286), Consonni (190), Persico (88), Malcotti (48), Arzuffi (40), Pirrone (40), Guazzini (32), Sanguineti (24), Piergiovanni (24), Vigie (16), Alzini (16)
12	Ceratizit–WNT Pro Cycling	1470	Brennauer (824), Magnaldi (284), Wild (140), Leth (86), Confalonieri (64), Lach (40), Hammes (32)
13	Tibco–Silicon Valley Bank	1300	Faulkner (923), Stephens (148), Smith (87), Kessler (84), Ewers (34), Gigante (16), Yonamine (8)
14	A.R. Monex	488	Sierra (134), Novolodskaya (132), Ragusa (126), (Note: Ragusa was given a ten-point sanction, as per Article 2.12.007 of the UCI road racing regulations.) Merino (64), Salazar (16), A. Gutiérrez (8), Ramírez (8)
15	Parkhotel Valkenburg	582	Neylan (179), van der Hulst (126), Bredewold (121), (Note: Bredewold was given a fifteen-point sanction, as per Article 2.12.007 of the UCI road racing regulations.) F. Markus (84), van Bokhoven (32), van Haaften (16), Gerritse (16), Limpens (8)
16	Arkéa Pro Cycling Team	376	Verhulst (320), Jounier (32), Levenez (24)
17	Drops–Le Col	322	Lowden (131), (Note: Lowden was given a 25-point sanction, as per Article 2.12.007 of the UCI road racing regulations.) van 't Geloof (105), Moberg (38), Martins (32), Penton (16)
18	Rally Cycling	320	Koppenburg (264), Doebel-Hickok (56)
19	NXTG Racing	130	Kool (58), de Zoete (24), Borgström (16), Rijnbeek (8), Knaven (8), Bossuyt (8), Am. Sharpe (8)
20	Lotto–Soudal Ladies	128	Nilsson (48), Smulders (48), Braam (24), Vandenbulcke (8)
37 (Note: Aromitalia–Basso Bikes–Vaiano scored 8 points through a 40th place finish for Letizia Borghesi at the Trofeo Alfredo Binda-Comune di Cittiglio, but Borghesi was latterly given a 10-point sanction as per Article 2.12.007 of the UCI road racing regulations. Andy Schleck–CP NVST–Immo Losch have scored 8 points, through Mie Bjørndal Ottestad's 35th place finish overall in the Ladies Tour of Norway, although she was riding for the Norwegian national team.) teams have scored points
