= 2021 Ladies Tour of Norway =

2021 UCI Women's World Tour, race 12 of 18

Race details
- Dates: 12–15 August 2021
- Stages: 4
- Distance: 573.2 km (356.2 mi)
- Winning time: 14h 46' 31"

Results
Jersey awarded to the overall winner	Winner	Annemiek van Vleuten (NED)	(Movistar Team)
	Second	Ashleigh Moolman (RSA)	(SD Worx)
	Third	Kristen Faulkner (USA)	(Tibco–Silicon Valley Bank)
Jersey awarded to the points classification winner	Points	Alison Jackson (CAN)	(Liv Racing)
Jersey awarded to the mountains classification winner	Mountains	Nina Buijsman (NED)	(Parkhotel Valkenburg)
Jersey awarded to the youth classification winner	Youth	Niamh Fisher-Black (NZL)	(SD Worx)
	Team	SD Worx	

The 2021 Ladies Tour of Norway was the eighth edition of the Ladies Tour of Norway, a women's road cycling stage race in Norway. The event took place from 12 to 15 August 2021 and is part of the 2021 UCI Women's World Tour. This edition is expected to be the last stand-alone Ladies Tour of Norway, as the race is set to expand to a six-day tour of Scandinavia (the Battle of the North) in 2022 that will also visit Denmark and Sweden.

== Teams ==
All nine UCI Women's WorldTeams, eight UCI Women's Continental Teams, and the Norwegian national team made up the eighteen teams that participated in the race. FDJ Nouvelle-Aquitaine Futuroscope, Liv Racing, Team BikeExchange, and Tibco–Silicon Valley Bank were the only teams to not enter a full squad of six riders; these four teams each entered five riders. Of the 104 riders who started the race, 95 finished.

UCI Women's WorldTeams

- Alé BTC Ljubljana
- Canyon//SRAM
- FDJ Nouvelle-Aquitaine Futuroscope
- Liv Racing
- Movistar Team
- SD Worx
- Team BikeExchange
- Team DSM
- Trek–Segafredo

UCI Women's Continental Teams

- Bingoal Casino–Chevalmeire
- Drops–Le Col
- Parkhotel Valkenburg
- Plantur–Pura
- Team Coop–Hitec Products
- Team Jumbo–Visma
- Tibco–Silicon Valley Bank
- Valcar–Travel & Service

National Teams

- Norway

== Route ==
The 2021 Ladies Tour of Norway took place in the county of Viken in Eastern Norway, with most of the race in the Østfold region. For the first time in the race's history, it featured a mountaintop finish, with a 10-kilometre (6.2 mi) long climb to Norefjell ski resort on stage 3.

Stage characteristics and winners
Stage	Date	Course	Distance	Type	Winner
1	12 August	Halden to Sarpsborg	141.5 km (87.9 mi)	Flat stage	Kristen Faulkner (USA)
2	13 August	Askim to Mysen	145 km (90 mi)	Hilly stage	Riejanne Markus (NED)
3	14 August	Drammen to Norefjell	145.1 km (90.2 mi)	Mountain stage	Annemiek van Vleuten (NED)
4	15 August	Drøbak to Halden	141.6 km (88.0 mi)	Flat stage	Chloe Hosking (AUS)
Total			573.2 km (356.2 mi)		

== Stages ==
=== Stage 1 ===
12 August 2021 — Halden to Sarpsborg, 141.5 km (87.9 mi)

Stage 1 Result
Rank	Rider	Team	Time
1	Kristen Faulkner (USA)	Tibco–Silicon Valley Bank	3h 38' 15"
2	Susanne Andersen (NOR)	Team DSM	+ 0"
3	Alice Barnes (GBR)	Canyon//SRAM	+ 0"
4	Cecilie Uttrup Ludwig (DEN)	FDJ Nouvelle-Aquitaine Futuroscope	+ 0"
5	Femke Markus (NED)	Parkhotel Valkenburg	+ 0"
6	Lucinda Brand (NED)	Trek–Segafredo	+ 0"
7	Annemiek van Vleuten (NED)	Movistar Team	+ 0"
8	Roxane Fournier (FRA)	SD Worx	+ 0"
9	Barbara Guarischi (ITA)	Movistar Team	+ 0"
10	Sofia Bertizzolo (ITA)	Liv Racing	+ 0"

General classification after Stage 1
Rank	Rider	Team	Time
1	Kristen Faulkner (USA)	Tibco–Silicon Valley Bank	3h 38' 05"
2	Susanne Andersen (NOR)	Team DSM	+ 4"
3	Alice Barnes (GBR)	Canyon//SRAM	+ 6"
4	Cecilie Uttrup Ludwig (DEN)	FDJ Nouvelle-Aquitaine Futuroscope	+ 10"
5	Femke Markus (NED)	Parkhotel Valkenburg	+ 10"
6	Lucinda Brand (NED)	Trek–Segafredo	+ 10"
7	Annemiek van Vleuten (NED)	Movistar Team	+ 10"
8	Roxane Fournier (FRA)	SD Worx	+ 10"
9	Barbara Guarischi (ITA)	Movistar Team	+ 10"
10	Sofia Bertizzolo (ITA)	Liv Racing	+ 10"

=== Stage 2 ===
13 August 2021 — Askim to Mysen, 145 km (90 mi)

Stage 2 Result
Rank	Rider	Team	Time
1	Riejanne Markus (NED)	Team Jumbo–Visma	3h 40' 01"
2	Coryn Rivera (USA)	Team DSM	+ 2"
3	Alison Jackson (CAN)	Liv Racing	+ 2"
4	Elise Chabbey (SUI)	Canyon//SRAM	+ 2"
5	Sanne Cant (BEL)	Plantur–Pura	+ 2"
6	Lucinda Brand (NED)	Trek–Segafredo	+ 2"
7	Sarah Roy (AUS)	Team BikeExchange	+ 2"
8	Eleonora Gasparrini (ITA)	Valcar–Travel & Service	+ 2"
9	Stine Borgli (NOR)	FDJ Nouvelle-Aquitaine Futuroscope	+ 2"
10	Kristen Faulkner (USA)	Tibco–Silicon Valley Bank	+ 2"

General classification after Stage 2
Rank	Rider	Team	Time
1	Riejanne Markus (NED)	Team Jumbo–Visma	7h 18' 06"
2	Kristen Faulkner (USA)	Tibco–Silicon Valley Bank	+ 2"
3	Coryn Rivera (USA)	Team DSM	+ 6"
4	Alison Jackson (CAN)	Liv Racing	+ 8"
5	Lucinda Brand (NED)	Trek–Segafredo	+ 12"
6	Sanne Cant (BEL)	Plantur–Pura	+ 12"
7	Cecilie Uttrup Ludwig (DEN)	FDJ Nouvelle-Aquitaine Futuroscope	+ 12"
8	Elise Chabbey (SUI)	Canyon//SRAM	+ 12"
9	Sarah Roy (AUS)	Team BikeExchange	+ 12"
10	Stine Borgli (NOR)	FDJ Nouvelle-Aquitaine Futuroscope	+ 12"

=== Stage 3 ===
14 August 2021 — Drammen to Norefjell, 145.1 km (90.2 mi)

Stage 3 Result
Rank	Rider	Team	Time
1	Annemiek van Vleuten (NED)	Movistar Team	3h 52' 17"
2	Ashleigh Moolman (RSA)	SD Worx	+ 35"
3	Mavi García (ESP)	Alé BTC Ljubljana	+ 41"
4	Marlen Reusser (SUI)	Alé BTC Ljubljana	+ 44"
5	Cecilie Uttrup Ludwig (DEN)	FDJ Nouvelle-Aquitaine Futuroscope	+ 48"
6	Kristen Faulkner (USA)	Tibco–Silicon Valley Bank	+ 50"
7	Rachel Neylan (AUS)	Parkhotel Valkenburg	+ 50"
8	Niamh Fisher-Black (NZL)	SD Worx	+ 1' 01"
9	Lucinda Brand (NED)	Trek–Segafredo	+ 1' 12"
10	Juliette Labous (FRA)	Team DSM	+ 1' 12"

General classification after Stage 3
Rank	Rider	Team	Time
1	Annemiek van Vleuten (NED)	Movistar Team	11h 10' 25"
2	Ashleigh Moolman (RSA)	SD Worx	+ 39"
3	Mavi García (ESP)	Alé BTC Ljubljana	+ 47"
4	Kristen Faulkner (USA)	Tibco–Silicon Valley Bank	+ 50"
5	Marlen Reusser (SUI)	Alé BTC Ljubljana	+ 54"
6	Cecilie Uttrup Ludwig (DEN)	FDJ Nouvelle-Aquitaine Futuroscope	+ 58"
7	Rachel Neylan (AUS)	Parkhotel Valkenburg	+ 1' 00"
8	Niamh Fisher-Black (NZL)	SD Worx	+ 1' 11"
9	Riejanne Markus (NED)	Team Jumbo–Visma	+ 1' 13"
10	Lucinda Brand (NED)	Trek–Segafredo	+ 1' 22"

=== Stage 4 ===
15 August 2021 — Drøbak to Halden, 141.6 km (88.0 mi)

Stage 4 Result
Rank	Rider	Team	Time
1	Chloe Hosking (AUS)	Trek–Segafredo	3h 36' 06"
2	Coryn Rivera (USA)	Team DSM	+ 0"
3	Chiara Consonni (ITA)	Valcar–Travel & Service	+ 0"
4	Christine Majerus (LUX)	SD Worx	+ 0"
5	Sarah Roy (AUS)	Team BikeExchange	+ 0"
6	Elise Chabbey (SUI)	Canyon//SRAM	+ 0"
7	Elena Cecchini (ITA)	SD Worx	+ 0"
8	Alison Jackson (CAN)	Liv Racing	+ 0"
9	Eugénie Duval (FRA)	FDJ Nouvelle-Aquitaine Futuroscope	+ 0"
10	Emilie Moberg (NOR)	Drops–Le Col	+ 0"

General classification after Stage 4
Rank	Rider	Team	Time
1	Annemiek van Vleuten (NED)	Movistar Team	14h 46' 31"
2	Ashleigh Moolman (RSA)	SD Worx	+ 39"
3	Kristen Faulkner (USA)	Tibco–Silicon Valley Bank	+ 50"
4	Marlen Reusser (SUI)	Alé BTC Ljubljana	+ 54"
5	Cecilie Uttrup Ludwig (DEN)	FDJ Nouvelle-Aquitaine Futuroscope	+ 58"
6	Rachel Neylan (AUS)	Parkhotel Valkenburg	+ 1' 00"
7	Riejanne Markus (NED)	Team Jumbo–Visma	+ 1' 13"
8	Juliette Labous (FRA)	Team DSM	+ 1' 22"
9	Lucinda Brand (NED)	Trek–Segafredo	+ 1' 22"
10	Yara Kastelijn (NED)	Plantur–Pura	+ 1' 24"

== Classification leadership table ==
Classification leadership by stage
Stage	Winner	General classification	Points classification	Mountains classification	Young rider classification	Best Norwegian rider award (Note: The jersey for the best Norwegian rider will not be worn during the race; it will only be presented at the podium ceremony after every stage to the best placed Norwegian finisher of that stage.)	Team classification
1	Kristen Faulkner	Kristen Faulkner	Kristen Faulkner	Nina Buijsman	Anna Shackley	Susanne Andersen	Team DSM
2	Riejanne Markus	Riejanne Markus	Kristen Faulkner	Nina Buijsman	Mischa Bredewold	Stine Borgli	Team Jumbo–Visma
3	Annemiek van Vleuten	Annemiek van Vleuten	Kristen Faulkner	Nina Buijsman	Niamh Fisher-Black	Ingrid Lorvik	Alé BTC Ljubljana
4	Chloe Hosking	Annemiek van Vleuten	Alison Jackson	Nina Buijsman	Niamh Fisher-Black	Emilie Moberg	SD Worx
Final		Annemiek van Vleuten	Alison Jackson	Nina Buijsman	Niamh Fisher-Black	Not awarded	SD Worx

- On stage 2, Christine Majerus, who was second in the points classification, wore the green jersey, because first-placed Kristen Faulkner wore the gold jersey as the leader of the general classification.

== Final classification standings ==
Legend
Denotes the winner of the general classification	Denotes the winner of the young rider classification
Denotes the winner of the points classification	Denotes the winner of the best Norwegian rider award
Denotes the winner of the mountains classification	

=== General classification ===
Final general classification (1–10)
Rank	Rider	Team	Time
1	Annemiek van Vleuten (NED)	Movistar Team	14h 46' 31"
2	Ashleigh Moolman (RSA)	SD Worx	+ 39"
3	Kristen Faulkner (USA)	Tibco–Silicon Valley Bank	+ 50"
4	Marlen Reusser (SUI)	Alé BTC Ljubljana	+ 54"
5	Cecilie Uttrup Ludwig (DEN)	FDJ Nouvelle-Aquitaine Futuroscope	+ 58"
6	Rachel Neylan (AUS)	Parkhotel Valkenburg	+ 1' 00"
7	Riejanne Markus (NED)	Team Jumbo–Visma	+ 1' 13"
8	Juliette Labous (FRA)	Team DSM	+ 1' 22"
9	Lucinda Brand (NED)	Trek–Segafredo	+ 1' 22"
10	Yara Kastelijn (NED)	Plantur–Pura	+ 1' 24"

=== Points classification ===
Final points classification (1–10)
Rank	Rider	Team	Points
1	Alison Jackson (CAN)	Liv Racing	25
2	Kristen Faulkner (USA)	Tibco–Silicon Valley Bank	24
3	Riejanne Markus (NED)	Team Jumbo–Visma	11
4	Christine Majerus (LUX)	SD Worx	10
5	Coryn Rivera (USA)	Team DSM	10
6	Chloe Hosking (AUS)	Trek–Segafredo	7
7	Tanja Erath (GER)	Tibco–Silicon Valley Bank	6
8	Susanne Andersen (NOR)	Team DSM	6
9	Brodie Chapman (AUS)	FDJ Nouvelle-Aquitaine Futuroscope	4
10	Rossella Ratto (ITA)	Bingoal Casino–Chevalmeire	4

=== Mountains classification ===
Final mountains classification (1–10)
Rank	Rider	Team	Points
1	Nina Buijsman (NED)	Parkhotel Valkenburg	15
2	Julie Van de Velde (BEL)	Team Jumbo–Visma	9
3	Anna Christian (GBR)	Drops–Le Col	6
4	Rossella Ratto (ITA)	Bingoal Casino–Chevalmeire	6
5	Kristen Faulkner (USA)	Tibco–Silicon Valley Bank	5
6	Annemiek van Vleuten (NED)	Movistar Team	4
7	Aude Biannic (FRA)	Movistar Team	4
8	Tiril Jørgensen (NOR)	Norway	4
9	Ashleigh Moolman (RSA)	SD Worx	3
10	Anna Shackley (GBR)	SD Worx	3

=== Young rider classification ===
Final young rider classification (1–10)
Rank	Rider	Team	Time
1	Niamh Fisher-Black (NZL)	SD Worx	14h 47' 58"
2	Anna Shackley (GBR)	SD Worx	+ 13"
3	Shirin van Anrooij (NED)	Trek–Segafredo	+ 1' 56"
4	Mischa Bredewold (NED)	Parkhotel Valkenburg	+ 2' 07"
5	Eleonora Gasparrini (ITA)	Valcar–Travel & Service	+ 3' 36"
6	Anne Dorthe Ysland (NOR)	Team Coop–Hitec Products	+ 3' 48"
7	Wilma Olausson (SWE)	Team DSM	+ 8' 36"
8	Inge van der Heijden (NED)	Plantur–Pura	+ 10' 23"
9	Femke Gerritse (NED)	Parkhotel Valkenburg	+ 11' 08"
10	Amalie Lutro (NOR)	Team Coop–Hitec Products	+ 12' 55"

=== Team classification ===
Final team classification (1–10)
Rank	Team	Time
1	SD Worx	44h 23' 09"
2	Alé BTC Ljubljana	+ 1' 32"
3	Canyon//SRAM	+ 2' 04"
4	Team DSM	+ 4' 33"
5	Team BikeExchange	+ 8' 23"
6	Parkhotel Valkenburg	+ 8' 24"
7	Team Jumbo–Visma	+ 8' 51"
8	Norway	+ 9' 51"
9	Plantur–Pura	+ 11' 09"
10	FDJ Nouvelle-Aquitaine Futuroscope	+ 14' 13"

== See also ==
- 2021 in women's road cycling
