= 2021 Amstel Gold Race (women's race) =

2021 UCI Women's World Tour, race 6 of 18
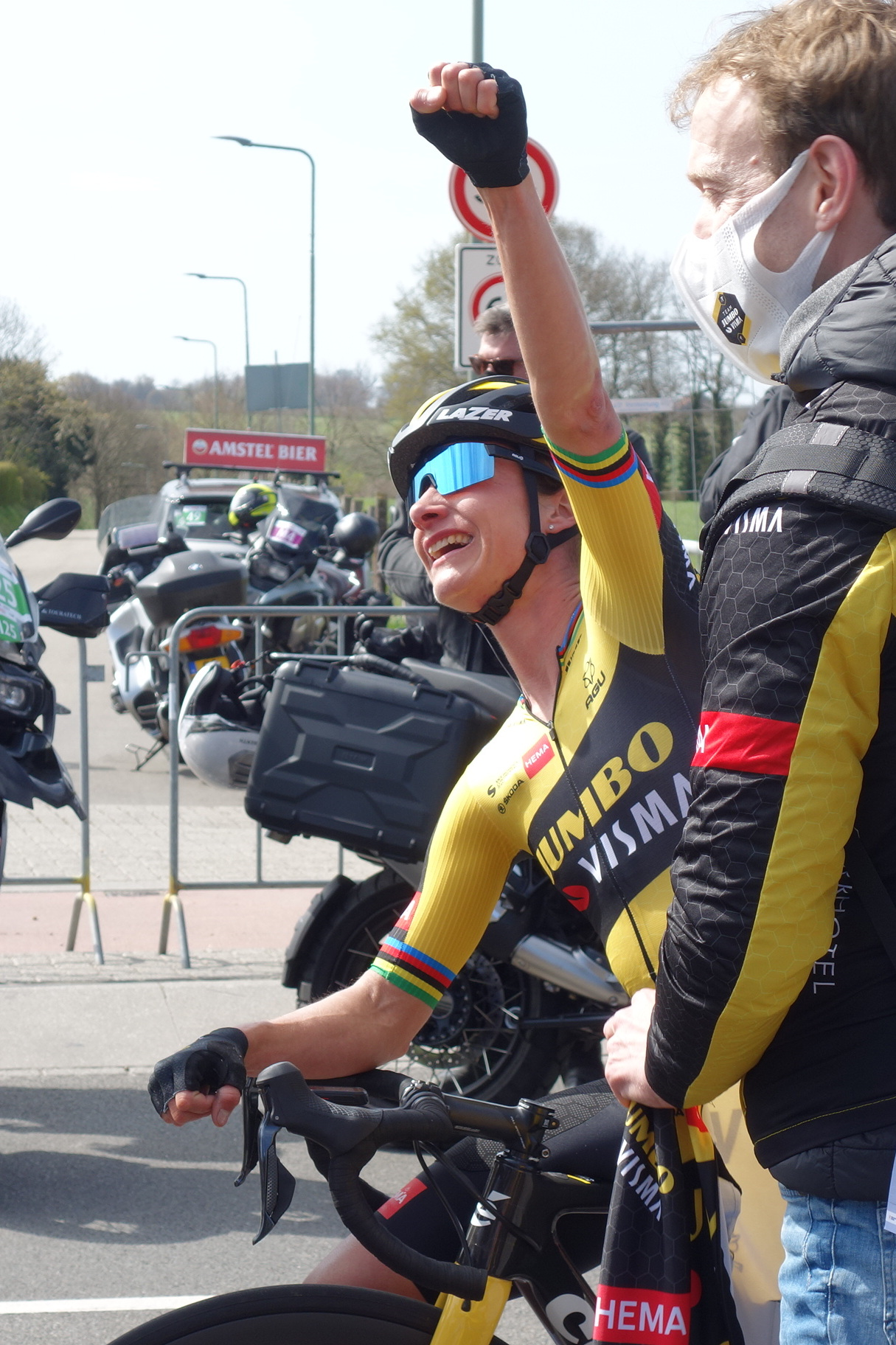
- Marianne Vos after winning the race

Race details
- Dates: 18 April 2021
- Stages: 1
- Distance: 118.3 km (73.5 mi)
- Winning time: 3h 00 '19"

Results
	Winner	Marianne Vos (NED)	(Team Jumbo–Visma)
	Second	Demi Vollering (NED)	(SD Worx)
	Third	Annemiek van Vleuten (NED)	(Movistar Team)

The seventh edition of the Amstel Gold Race for Women was a road cycling one-day race held on 18 April 2021 in the Netherlands. It was the sixth event of the 2021 UCI Women's World Tour. Due to the COVID-19 pandemic, the race was held on a 17 km circuit including the Geulhemmerberg, the Bemelerberg and the Cauberg, and the area was closed to spectators. The race was won by Marianne Vos in a sprint, after the two escapees were caught in the final 500 meters of the race.

== Teams ==
Nine UCI Women's WorldTeams and fifteen UCI Women's Continental Teams are expected to compete in the race.

UCI Women's WorldTeams

- Alé BTC Ljubljana
- Canyon//SRAM
- FDJ Nouvelle-Aquitaine Futuroscope
- Liv Racing
- Movistar Team
- SD Worx
- Team BikeExchange
- Team DSM
- Trek–Segafredo

UCI Women's Continental Teams

- A.R. Monex
- Andy Schleck–CP NVST–Immo Losch
- Bingoal Casino–Chevalmeire
- CAMS–Basso Bikes
- Ceratizit–WNT Pro Cycling
- Cogeas–Mettler–Look
- Doltcini–Van Eyck–Proximus
- GT Krush Tunap
- Team Jumbo–Visma
- Lotto–Soudal Ladies
- Multum Accountants Ladies
- NXTG Racing
- Parkhotel Valkenburg
- Tibco–Silicon Valley Bank
- Valcar–Travel & Service

== Results ==
Result
Rank	Rider	Team	Time
1	Marianne Vos (NED)	Team Jumbo–Visma	3h 00' 20"
2	Demi Vollering (NED)	SD Worx	+ 0"
3	Annemiek van Vleuten (NED)	Movistar Team	+ 0"
4	Amanda Spratt (AUS)	Team BikeExchange	+ 0"
5	Soraya Paladin (ITA)	Liv Racing	+ 0"
6	Mavi García (ESP)	Alé BTC Ljubljana	+ 0"
7	Cecilie Uttrup Ludwig (DEN)	FDJ Nouvelle-Aquitaine Futuroscope	+ 1"
8	Elisa Longo Borghini (ITA)	Trek–Segafredo	+ 1"
9	Ashleigh Moolman-Pasio (RSA)	SD Worx	+ 1"
10	Katarzyna Niewiadoma (POL)	Canyon//SRAM	+ 2"
