= 2021 Trofeo Alfredo Binda-Comune di Cittiglio =

2021 UCI Women's World Tour, race 2 of 18
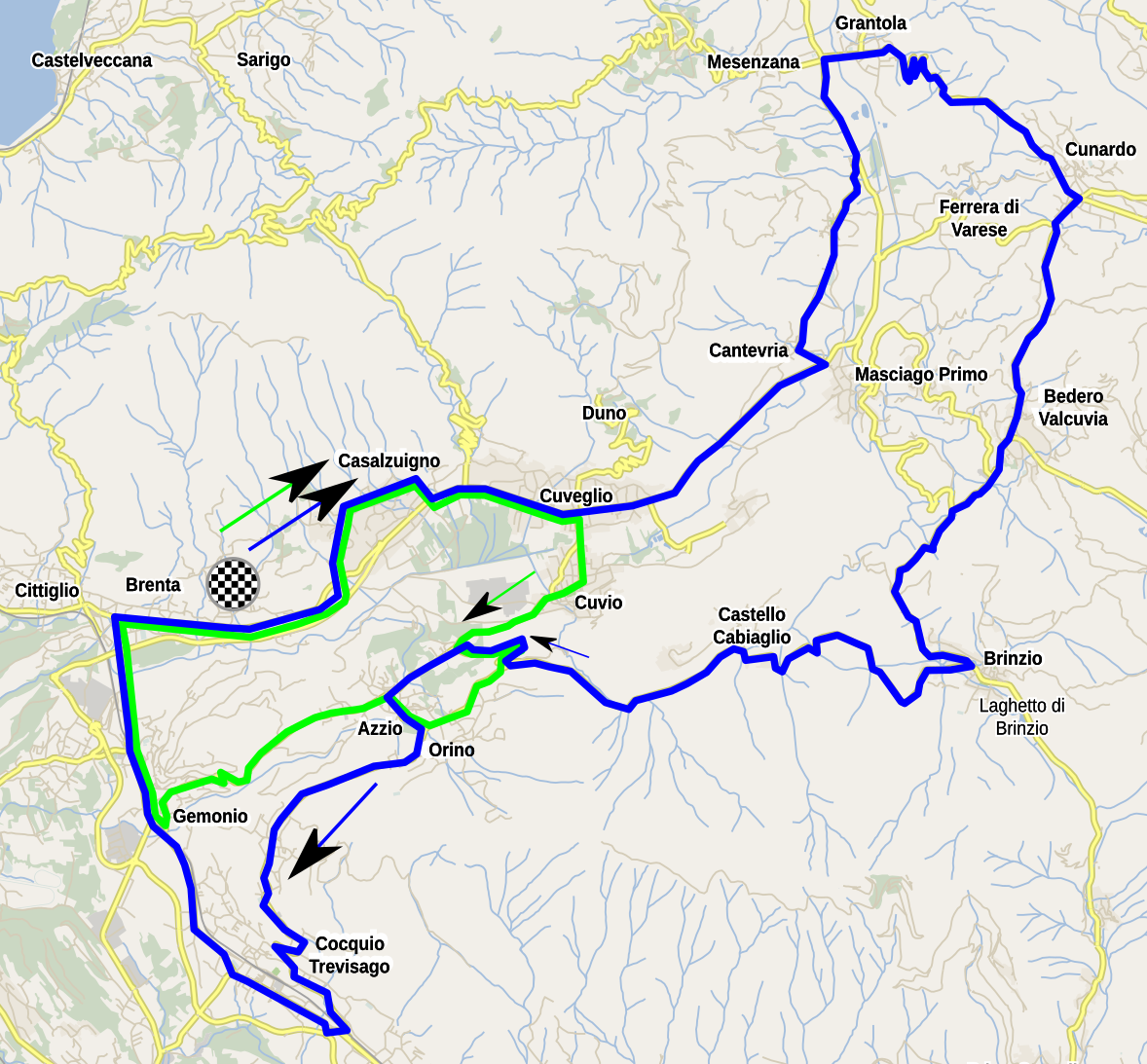

Race details
- Dates: 21 March 2021
- Stages: 1
- Distance: 141.8 km (88.1 mi)
- Winning time: 3h 43' 29"

Results
	Winner	Elisa Longo Borghini (ITA)	(Trek–Segafredo)
	Second	Marianne Vos (NED)	(Team Jumbo–Visma)
	Third	Cecilie Uttrup Ludwig (DEN)	(FDJ Nouvelle-Aquitaine Futuroscope)

The 2021 Trofeo Alfredo Binda-Comune di Cittiglio was the 45th running of the Trofeo Alfredo Binda, a women's cycling race in Italy. It was the second event of the 2021 UCI Women's World Tour season and was held on 21 March 2021. The race started in Cocquio-Trevisago and finished in Cittiglio, on the outskirts of Lago Maggiore in Northwest Italy. The event was cancelled in 2020 due to the COVID-19 pandemic.

The race was won by Italian rider Elisa Longo Borghini of Trek–Segafredo by over 90 seconds, after an attack on the penultimate lap on the Orino climb. It was Longo Borghini's second victory at Trofeo Binda, following her victory in the 2013 edition.

== Teams ==
22 teams competed in the race.

UCI Women's WorldTeams

- Alé BTC Ljubljana
- Canyon//SRAM
- FDJ Nouvelle-Aquitaine Futuroscope
- Liv Racing
- Movistar Team
- SD Worx
- Team BikeExchange
- Team DSM
- Trek–Segafredo

UCI Women's Continental Teams

- A.R. Monex
- Ceratizit–WNT Pro Cycling
- Cogeas–Mettler–Look
- Team Jumbo–Visma
- Parkhotel Valkenburg
- Tibco–Silicon Valley Bank
- Aromitalia–Basso Bikes–Vaiano
- Bepink
- Born to Win G20 Ambedo
- Isolmant–Premac–Vittoria
- Servetto–Makhymo–Beltrami TSA
- Top Girls Fassa Bortolo
- Valcar–Travel & Service

== Result ==
Final general classification

Rank	Rider	Team	Time
1	Elisa Longo Borghini (ITA)	Trek–Segafredo	3h 43' 29"
2	Marianne Vos (NED)	Team Jumbo–Visma	1' 42"
3	Cecilie Uttrup Ludwig (DEN)	FDJ Nouvelle-Aquitaine Futuroscope	s.t.
4	Katarzyna Niewiadoma (POL)	Canyon//SRAM	s.t.
5	Soraya Paladin (ITA)	Liv Racing	s.t.
6	Margarita Victoria García (ESP)	Alé BTC Ljubljana	s.t.
7	Elisa Balsamo (ITA)	Valcar–Travel & Service	2' 46"
8	Sofia Bertizzolo (ITA)	Liv Racing	s.t.
9	Emilia Fahlin (SWE)	FDJ Nouvelle-Aquitaine Futuroscope	s.t.
10	Floortje Mackaij (NED)	Team DSM	s.t.

== See also ==
- 2021 in women's road cycling
