= 2021 Gent–Wevelgem (women's race) =

Cycling race

2021 UCI Women's World Tour, race 4 of 18
- Event poster with previous winners Jolien D'Hoore and Mads Pedersen

Race details
- Dates: 28 March 2021
- Stages: 1
- Distance: 144 km (89 mi)
- Winning time: 3h 45' 08"

Results
	Winner	Marianne Vos (NED)	(Team Jumbo–Visma)
	Second	Lotte Kopecky (BEL)	(Liv Racing)
	Third	Lisa Brennauer (GER)	(Ceratizit–WNT Pro Cycling)

The tenth edition of the Gent–Wevelgem's women's race was held on Sunday 28 March 2021. It was the fourth event of the 2021 UCI Women's World Tour and was won by Marianne Vos in a sprint.

== Route ==
Due to the COVID-19 pandemic in Belgium, the race organisers ask spectators to follow the race from home and have released limited information on the course to the public before the race started.

== Teams ==
Nine UCI Women's WorldTeams and fifteen UCI Women's Continental Teams will compete in the race. Out of 144 riders that started the race there were 111 finishers.

UCI Women's WorldTeams

- Alé BTC Ljubljana
- Canyon//SRAM
- FDJ Nouvelle-Aquitaine Futuroscope
- Liv Racing
- Movistar Team
- SD Worx
- Team BikeExchange
- Team DSM
- Trek–Segafredo

UCI Women's Continental Teams

- Ceratizit–WNT Pro Cycling
- Lotto–Soudal Ladies
- A.R. Monex
- Parkhotel Valkenburg
- Valcar–Travel & Service
- Bingoal Casino–Chevalmeire
- Plantur–Pura
- Doltcini–Van Eyck–Proximus
- Multum Accountants Ladies
- Drops–Le Col
- Team Coop–Hitec Products
- NXTG Racing
- Team Rupelcleaning–Champion Lubricants
- Team Jumbo–Visma
- Tibco–Silicon Valley Bank

== Results ==
Result
Rank	Rider	Team	Time
1	Marianne Vos (NED)	Team Jumbo–Visma	3h 45' 08"
2	Lotte Kopecky (BEL)	Liv Racing	+ 0"
3	Lisa Brennauer (GER)	Ceratizit–WNT Pro Cycling	+ 0"
4	Elisa Balsamo (ITA)	Valcar–Travel & Service	+ 0"
5	Marta Bastianelli (ITA)	Alé BTC Ljubljana	+ 0"
6	Emilia Fahlin (SWE)	FDJ Nouvelle-Aquitaine Futuroscope	+ 0"
7	Kristen Faulkner (USA)	Tibco–Silicon Valley Bank	+ 0"
8	Sarah Roy (AUS)	Team BikeExchange	+ 0"
9	Emma Norsgaard Jørgensen (DEN)	Movistar Team	+ 0"
10	Lauren Stephens (USA)	Tibco–Silicon Valley Bank	+ 0"

== See also ==
- 2021 in women's road cycling
