= 2021 Holland Ladies Tour =

Women's road cycling stage race in the Netherlands

2021 UCI Women's World Tour, race 13 of 18
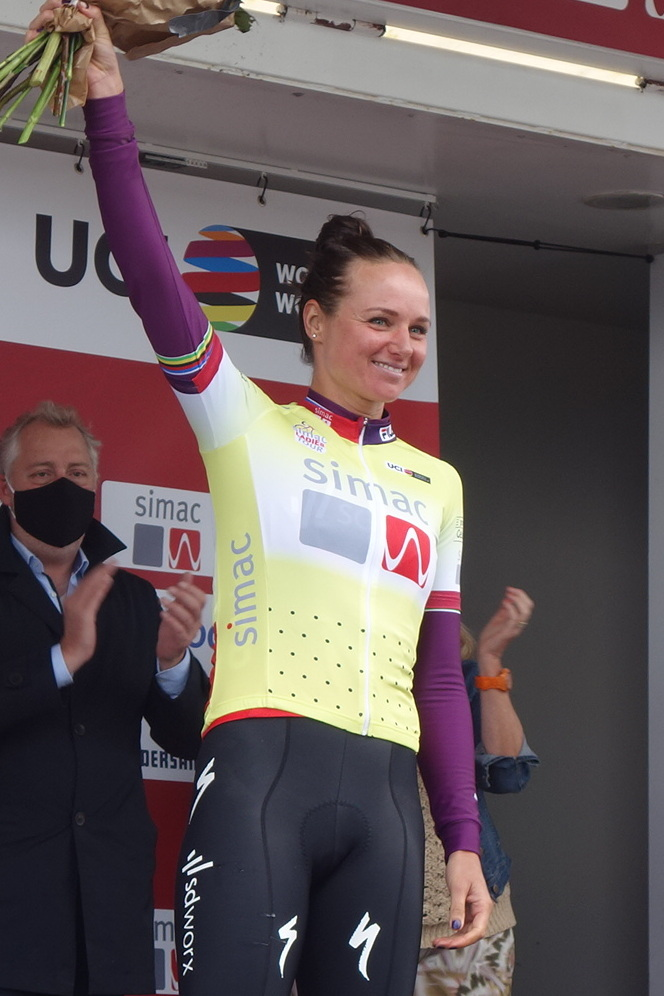
- Overall winner Chantal van den Broek-Blaak

Race details
- Dates: 24–29 August 2021
- Stages: 6
- Distance: 572.8 km (355.9 mi)
- Winning time: 14h 46" 39'

Results
Jersey awarded to the overall winner	Winner	Chantal van den Broek-Blaak (NED)	(SD Worx)
	Second	Marlen Reusser (SWI)	(Alé BTC Ljubljana)
	Third	Ellen van Dijk (NED)	(Trek–Segafredo)
Jersey awarded to the points classification winner	Points	Marianne Vos (NED)	(Team Jumbo–Visma)
Jersey awarded to the mountains classification winner	Mountains	Anouska Koster (NED)	(Team Jumbo–Visma)
Jersey awarded to the young rider classification winner	Young rider	Pfeiffer Georgi (GBR)	(Team DSM)
	Team	(Netherlands) SD Worx	

The 2021 Holland Ladies Tour, also known as the 2021 Simac Ladies Tour, is a road cycling stage race that took place in the Netherlands between 24 and 29 August 2021. It was the 23rd edition of the Holland Ladies Tour, and part of the 2021 UCI Women's World Tour.

== Teams ==
All nine UCI Women's WorldTeams and seven UCI Women's Continental Teams made up the sixteen teams that participated the race.

UCI Women's WorldTeams

- Alé BTC Ljubljana
- Canyon//SRAM
- Team DSM
- FDJ Nouvelle-Aquitaine Futuroscope
- Liv Racing
- Movistar Team
- SD Worx
- Team BikeExchange
- Trek–Segafredo

UCI Women's Continental Teams

- Ceratizit–WNT Pro Cycling
- GT Krush Tunap
- Team Jumbo–Visma
- Lotto–Soudal Ladies
- NXTG Racing
- Parkhotel Valkenburg
- Valcar–Travel & Service

== Route ==
Stage characteristics and winners
Stage	Date	Course	Distance	Type	Stage winner
P	24 August	Ede to Ede	2.4 km (1.5 mi)	Individual time trial	Marianne Vos (NED)
1	25 August	Zwolle to Hardenberg	134.8 km (83.8 mi)	Flat stage	Alison Jackson (CAN)
2	26 August	Gennep to Gennep	17.0 km (10.6 mi)	Individual time trial	Marlen Reusser (SWI)
3	27 August	Stramproy to Weert	120.3 km (74.8 mi)	Flat stage	Lonneke Uneken (NED)
4	28 August	Geleen to Sweikhuizen	148.9 km (92.5 mi)	Hilly stage	Marianne Vos (NED)
5	29 August	Arnhem to Arnhem	149.4 km (92.8 mi)	Hilly stage	Marianne Vos (NED)
Total			572.8 km (355.9 mi)		

== Stages ==
=== Prologue ===
24 August 2021 – Ede to Ede, 2.4 km (1.5 mi)

Prologue Result
Rank	Rider	Team	Time
1	Marianne Vos (NED)	Team Jumbo–Visma	3' 01"
2	Ellen van Dijk (NED)	Trek–Segafredo	+ 5"
3	Cecilie Uttrup Ludwig (DEN)	FDJ Nouvelle-Aquitaine Futuroscope	+ 6"
4	Lonneke Uneken (NED)	SD Worx	+ 6"
5	Lorena Wiebes (NED)	Team DSM	+ 7"
6	Christine Majerus (LUX)	SD Worx	+ 7"
7	Elisa Balsamo (ITA)	Valcar–Travel & Service	+ 8"
8	Lisa Klein (GER)	Canyon//SRAM	+ 8"
9	Barbara Guarischi (ITA)	Movistar Team	+ 8"
10	Charlotte Kool (NED)	NXTG Racing	+ 8"

General classification after Prologue
Rank	Rider	Team	Time
1	Marianne Vos (NED)	Team Jumbo–Visma	3' 01"
2	Ellen van Dijk (NED)	Trek–Segafredo	+ 5"
3	Cecilie Uttrup Ludwig (DEN)	FDJ Nouvelle-Aquitaine Futuroscope	+ 6"
4	Lonneke Uneken (NED)	SD Worx	+ 6"
5	Lorena Wiebes (NED)	Team DSM	+ 7"
6	Christine Majerus (LUX)	SD Worx	+ 7"
7	Elisa Balsamo (ITA)	Valcar–Travel & Service	+ 8"
8	Lisa Klein (GER)	Canyon//SRAM	+ 8"
9	Barbara Guarischi (ITA)	Movistar Team	+ 8"
10	Charlotte Kool (NED)	NXTG Racing	+ 8"

=== Stage 1 ===
25 August 2021 – Zwolle to Hardenberg, 134.8 km (83.8 mi)

Stage 1 Result
Rank	Rider	Team	Time
1	Alison Jackson (CAN)	Liv Racing	3h 18' 20"
2	Maëlle Grossetête (FRA)	FDJ Nouvelle-Aquitaine Futuroscope	+ 0"
3	Lorena Wiebes (NED)	Team DSM	+ 4"
4	Marianne Vos (NED)	Team Jumbo–Visma	+ 4"
5	Charlotte Kool (NED)	NXTG Racing	+ 4"
6	Barbara Guarischi (ITA)	Movistar Team	+ 4"
7	Emma Norsgaard Jørgensen (DEN)	Movistar Team	+ 4"
8	Elisa Balsamo (ITA)	Valcar–Travel & Service	+ 4"
9	Marta Bastianelli (ITA)	Alé BTC Ljubljana	+ 4"
10	Lonneke Uneken (NED)	SD Worx	+ 4"

General classification after Stage 1
Rank	Rider	Team	Time
1	Alison Jackson (CAN)	Liv Racing	3h 21' 25"
2	Marianne Vos (NED)	Team Jumbo–Visma	+ 0"
3	Lorena Wiebes (NED)	Team DSM	+ 3"
4	Ellen van Dijk (NED)	Trek–Segafredo	+ 5"
5	Cecilie Uttrup Ludwig (DEN)	FDJ Nouvelle-Aquitaine Futuroscope	+ 6"
6	Lonneke Uneken (NED)	SD Worx	+ 6"
7	Christine Majerus (LUX)	SD Worx	+ 7"
8	Maëlle Grossetête (FRA)	FDJ Nouvelle-Aquitaine Futuroscope	+ 8"
9	Elisa Balsamo (ITA)	Valcar–Travel & Service	+ 8"
10	Lisa Klein (GER)	Canyon//SRAM	+ 8"

=== Stage 2 ===
26 August 2021 – Gennep to Gennep, 17.0 km (10.6 mi)

Stage 1 Result
Rank	Rider	Team	Time
1	Marlen Reusser (SWI)	Alé BTC Ljubljana	20' 41"
2	Ellen van Dijk (NED)	Trek–Segafredo	+ 18"
3	Chantal van den Broek-Blaak (NED)	SD Worx	+ 41"
4	Lisa Klein (GER)	Canyon//SRAM	+ 50"
5	Emma Norsgaard Jørgensen (DEN)	Movistar Team	+ 1' 01"
6	Demi Vollering (NED)	SD Worx	+ 1' 18"
7	Sarah Roy (AUS)	Team BikeExchange	+ 1' 28"
8	Julie Leth (DEN)	Ceratizit–WNT Pro Cycling	+ 1' 30"
9	Alice Barnes (GBR)	Canyon//SRAM	+ 1' 31"
10	Anouska Koster (NED)	Team Jumbo–Visma	+ 1' 37"

General classification after Stage 2
Rank	Rider	Team	Time
1	Marlen Reusser (SWI)	Alé BTC Ljubljana	3h 42' 17"
2	Ellen van Dijk (NED)	Trek–Segafredo	+ 12"
3	Chantal van den Broek-Blaak (NED)	SD Worx	+ 39"
4	Lisa Klein (GER)	Canyon//SRAM	+ 47"
5	Emma Norsgaard Jørgensen (DEN)	Movistar Team	+ 1' 01"
6	Demi Vollering (NED)	SD Worx	+ 1' 19"
7	Alice Barnes (GBR)	Canyon//SRAM	+ 1' 29"
8	Anouska Koster (NED)	Team Jumbo–Visma	+ 1' 29"
9	Sarah Roy (AUS)	Team BikeExchange	+ 1' 31"
10	Marianne Vos (NED)	Team Jumbo–Visma	+ 1' 34"

=== Stage 3 ===
27 August 2021 – Stramproy to Weert, 120.3 km (74.8 mi)

Stage 1 Result
Rank	Rider	Team	Time
1	Lonneke Uneken (NED)	SD Worx	2h 52' 41"
2	Susanne Andersen (NOR)	Team DSM	+ 0"
3	Pfeiffer Georgi (GBR)	Team DSM	+ 0"
4	Chantal van den Broek-Blaak (NED)	SD Worx	+ 0"
5	Amy Pieters (NED)	SD Worx	+ 0"
6	Demi Vollering (NED)	SD Worx	+ 0"
7	Marta Bastianelli (ITA)	Alé BTC Ljubljana	+ 14"
8	Marianne Vos (NED)	Team Jumbo–Visma	+ 14"
9	Chiara Consonni (ITA)	Valcar–Travel & Service	+ 29"
10	Amalie Dideriksen (DEN)	Trek–Segafredo	+ 29"

General classification after Stage 3
Rank	Rider	Team	Time
1	Marlen Reusser (SWI)	Alé BTC Ljubljana	6h 35' 27"
2	Chantal van den Broek-Blaak (NED)	SD Worx	+ 10"
3	Ellen van Dijk (NED)	Trek–Segafredo	+ 12"
4	Lisa Klein (GER)	Canyon//SRAM	+ 47"
5	Demi Vollering (NED)	SD Worx	+ 50"
6	Pfeiffer Georgi (GBR)	Team DSM	+ 1' 07"
7	Marianne Vos (NED)	Team Jumbo–Visma	+ 1' 19"
8	Amy Pieters (NED)	SD Worx	+ 1' 28"
9	Anouska Koster (NED)	Team Jumbo–Visma	+ 1' 29"
10	Vittoria Guazzini (ITA)	Valcar–Travel & Service	+ 1' 37"

=== Stage 4 ===
28 August 2021 – Geleen to Sweikhuizen, 148.9 km (92.5 mi)

Stage 1 Result
Rank	Rider	Team	Time
1	Marianne Vos (NED)	Team Jumbo–Visma	4h 15' 08"
2	Katarzyna Niewiadoma (POL)	Canyon//SRAM	+ 2"
3	Chantal van den Broek-Blaak (NED)	SD Worx	+ 2"
4	Amy Pieters (NED)	SD Worx	+ 17"
5	Demi Vollering (NED)	SD Worx	+ 17"
6	Marta Bastianelli (ITA)	Alé BTC Ljubljana	+ 17"
7	Alison Jackson (CAN)	Liv Racing	+ 17"
8	Pfeiffer Georgi (GBR)	Team DSM	+ 19"
9	Eugénie Duval (FRA)	FDJ Nouvelle-Aquitaine Futuroscope	+ 19"
10	Ella Harris (NZL)	Canyon//SRAM	+ 21"

General classification after Stage 4
Rank	Rider	Team	Time
1	Chantal van den Broek-Blaak (NED)	SD Worx	10h 50' 38"
2	Marlen Reusser (SWI)	Alé BTC Ljubljana	+ 20"
3	Ellen van Dijk (NED)	Trek–Segafredo	+ 30"
4	Demi Vollering (NED)	SD Worx	+ 1' 03"
5	Marianne Vos (NED)	Team Jumbo–Visma	+ 1' 04"
6	Pfeiffer Georgi (GBR)	Team DSM	+ 1' 23"
7	Amy Pieters (NED)	SD Worx	+ 1' 42"
8	Alison Jackson (CAN)	Liv Racing	+ 2' 08"
9	Jeanne Korevaar (NED)	Liv Racing	+ 2' 30"
10	Marta Bastianelli (ITA)	Alé BTC Ljubljana	+ 2' 39"

=== Stage 5 ===
29 August 2021 – Arnhem to Arnhem, 149.4 km (92.8 mi)

Stage 1 Result
Rank	Rider	Team	Time
1	Marianne Vos (NED)	Team Jumbo–Visma	3h 55' 58"
2	Alice Barnes (GBR)	Canyon//SRAM	+ 0"
3	Amy Pieters (NED)	SD Worx	+ 0"
4	Amalie Dideriksen (DEN)	Trek–Segafredo	+ 0"
5	Alison Jackson (CAN)	Liv Racing	+ 0"
6	Pfeiffer Georgi (GBR)	Team DSM	+ 0"
7	Alicia González Blanco (ESP)	Movistar Team	+ 0"
8	Marlen Reusser (SWI)	Alé BTC Ljubljana	+ 0"
9	Clara Copponi (FRA)	FDJ Nouvelle-Aquitaine Futuroscope	+ 0"
10	Ellen van Dijk (NED)	Trek–Segafredo	+ 3"

General classification after Stage 5
Rank	Rider	Team	Time
1	Chantal van den Broek-Blaak (NED)	SD Worx	10h 50' 38"
2	Marlen Reusser (SWI)	Alé BTC Ljubljana	+ 17"
3	Ellen van Dijk (NED)	Trek–Segafredo	+ 30"
4	Marianne Vos (NED)	Team Jumbo–Visma	+ 51"
5	Demi Vollering (NED)	SD Worx	+ 1' 03"
6	Pfeiffer Georgi (GBR)	Team DSM	+ 1' 20"
7	Amy Pieters (NED)	SD Worx	+ 1' 35"
8	Alison Jackson (CAN)	Liv Racing	+ 2' 05"
9	Marta Bastianelli (ITA)	Alé BTC Ljubljana	+ 2' 39"
10	Jeanne Korevaar (NED)	Liv Racing	+ 2' 49"

== Classification leadership table ==
Stage	Winner	General classification	Points classification	Mountain classification	Young rider classification	Combativity classification
P	Marianne Vos	Marianne Vos	Marianne Vos	not awarded	Lonneke Uneken	not awarded
1	Alison Jackson	Alison Jackson	Marianne Vos	Alison Jackson	Lorena Wiebes	Alison Jackson
2	Marlen Reusser	Marlen Reusser	Ellen van Dijk	Alison Jackson	Emma Norsgaard Jørgensen	not awarded
3	Lonneke Uneken	Marlen Reusser	Marianne Vos	Alison Jackson	Pfeiffer Georgi	Daniek Hengeveld
4	Marianne Vos	Chantal van den Broek-Blaak	Marianne Vos	Alison Jackson	Pfeiffer Georgi	Anouska Koster
5	Marianne Vos	Chantal van den Broek-Blaak	Marianne Vos	Anouska Koster	Pfeiffer Georgi	Trixi Worrack
Final Classification		Chantal van den Broek-Blaak	Marianne Vos	Anouska Koster	Pfeiffer Georgi	
