= 2021 La Course by Le Tour de France =

Cycling race

2021 UCI Women's World Tour, race 10 of 18
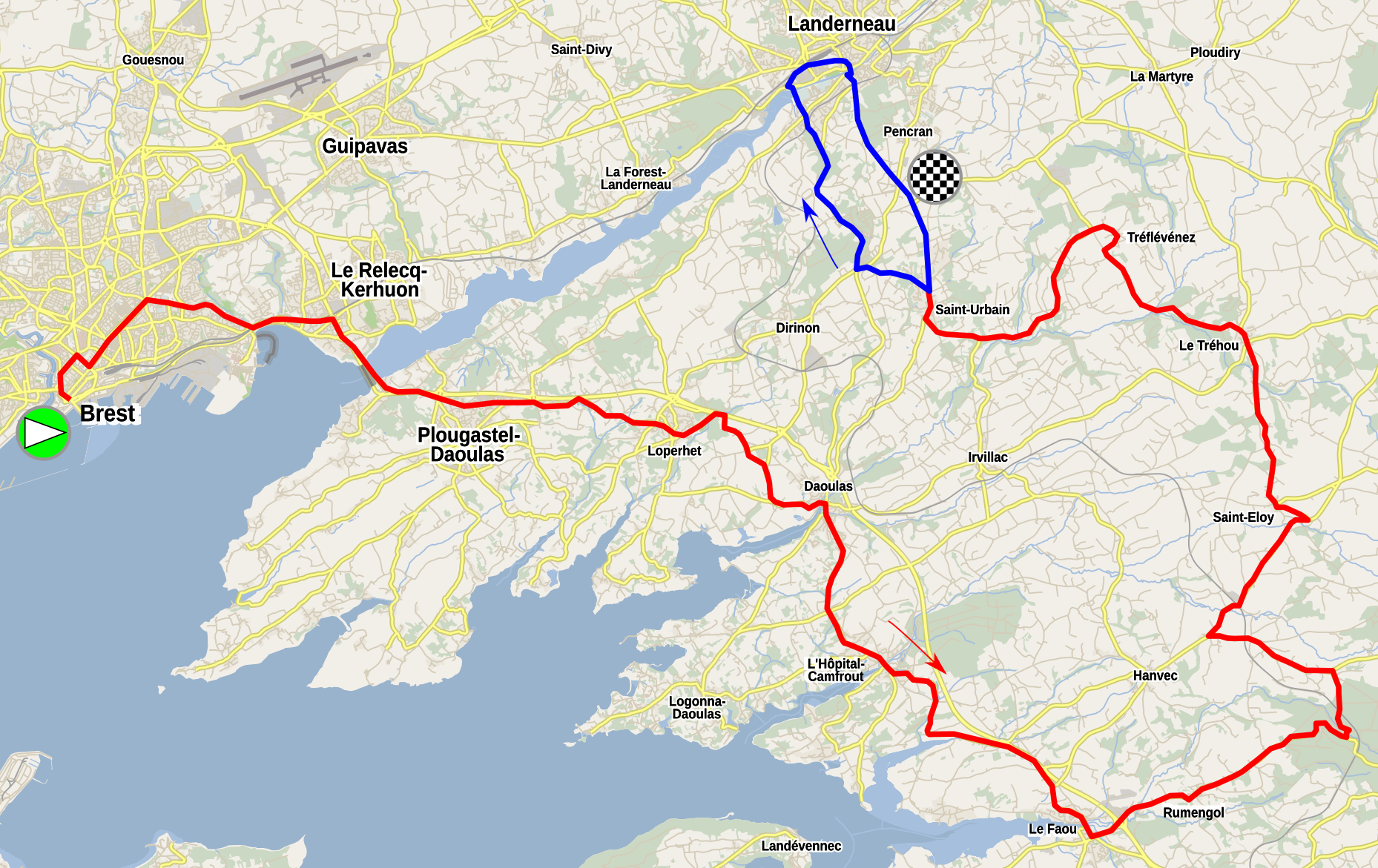

Race details
- Dates: 26 June 2021
- Stages: 1
- Distance: 107.4 km (66.7 mi)
- Winning time: 2h 50' 29"

Results
	Winner	Demi Vollering (NED)	(SD Worx)
	Second	Cecilie Uttrup Ludwig (DEN)	(FDJ Nouvelle-Aquitaine Futuroscope)
	Third	Marianne Vos (NED)	(Team Jumbo–Visma)

The 2021 La Course by Le Tour de France was the eighth edition of La Course by Le Tour de France, a women's cycling race held in France. It took place on 26 June 2021 and was the tenth event on the 2021 UCI Women's World Tour. The event was organised by ASO, which also organises the Tour de France. This was the last edition of La Course, which was replaced by Tour de France Femmes in 2022.

The race was won by Dutch rider Demi Vollering of SD Worx in a sprint finish.

== Route ==
The race started in Brest and finished at the top of the Cote de la Fosse aux Loups in Landerneau, after 3 laps of the final circuit of 14.5 km. The total distance of the race was 107.4 km. La Course was held before stage 1 of the men's 2021 Tour de France.

== Teams ==
Nine UCI Women's WorldTeams and fourteen UCI Women's Continental Teams made up the twenty-two teams that competed in the race. Each team entered six riders except for Team BikeExchange, Movistar Team, Stade Rochelais Charente-Maritime and Tibco–Silicon Valley Bank, which entered five each. Of the 127 riders in the race, only 102 finished, while a further 6 riders finished over the time limit.

UCI Women's WorldTeams

- Alé BTC Ljubljana
- Canyon//SRAM
- Liv Racing
- FDJ Nouvelle-Aquitaine Futuroscope
- Team BikeExchange
- Movistar Team
- SD Worx
- Team DSM
- Trek–Segafredo

UCI Women's Continental Teams

- Arkéa Pro Cycling Team
- A.R. Monex
- Bizkaia–Durango
- Drops–Le Col
- Massi–Tactic
- Ceratizit–WNT Pro Cycling
- Stade Rochelais Charente-Maritime
- Parkhotel Valkenburg
- Rally Cycling
- Tibco–Silicon Valley Bank
- Top Girls Fassa Bortolo
- Valcar–Travel & Service
- Team Jumbo–Visma

== Results ==
Result
Rank	Rider	Team	Time
1	Demi Vollering (NED)	SD Worx	2h 50' 29"
2	Cecilie Uttrup Ludwig (DEN)	FDJ Nouvelle-Aquitaine Futuroscope	+ 0"
3	Marianne Vos (NED)	Team Jumbo–Visma	+ 0"
4	Anna van der Breggen (NED)	SD Worx	+ 0"
5	Grace Brown (AUS)	Team BikeExchange	+ 0"
6	Katarzyna Niewiadoma (POL)	Canyon//SRAM	+ 0"
7	Soraya Paladin (ITA)	Liv Racing	+ 0"
8	Liane Lippert (GER)	Team DSM	+ 0"
9	Elizabeth Deignan (GBR)	Trek–Segafredo	+ 4"
10	Sofia Bertizzolo (ITA)	Liv Racing	+ 4"

== See also ==
- 2021 in women's road cycling
