= 2021 Classic Brugge–De Panne (women's race) =

2021 Women's Three Days of Bruges–De Panne
2021 UCI Women's World Tour, race 3 of 18
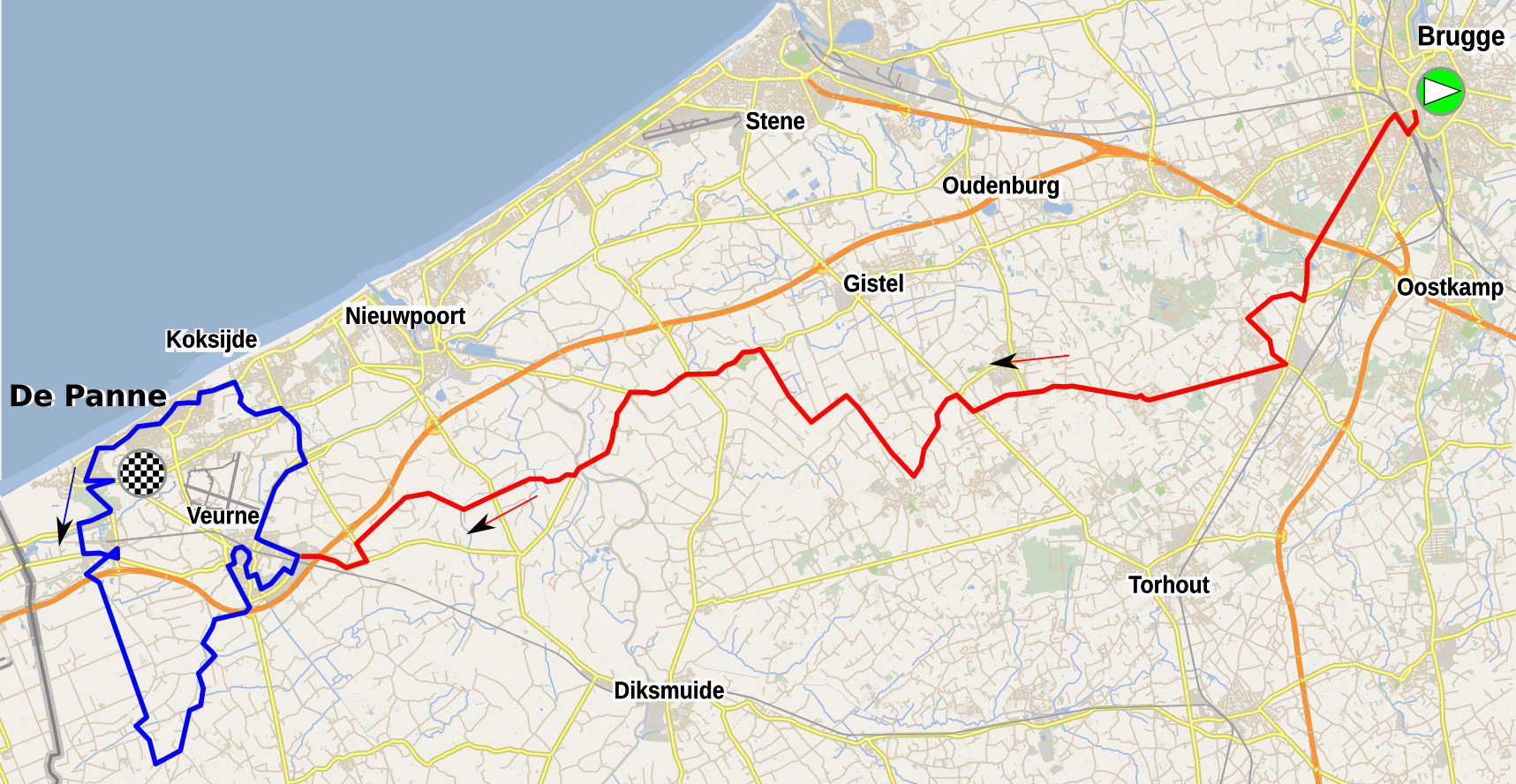

Race details
- Dates: 25 March 2021
- Stages: 1
- Distance: 158.8 km (98.7 mi)

Results
	Winner	Grace Brown (AUS)	(Team BikeExchange)
	Second	Emma Norsgaard Jørgensen (DEN)	(Movistar Team)
	Third	Jolien D'Hoore (BEL)	(SD Worx)

The fourth running of the women's event of the Three Days of Bruges–De Panne, also called Oxyclean Classic Brugge–De Panne, was held on 25 March 2021. It was the third race of the 2021 UCI Women's World Tour. The race was won by Australian rider Grace Brown of Team BikeExchange.

== Teams ==
All nine UCI Women's WorldTeams and fourteen UCI Women's Continental Teams competed in the race. Of these twenty-three teams, only two did not enter with the maximum squad of six riders: Lotto–Soudal Ladies entered five and Team Coop–Hitec Products entered four. Cogeas–Mettler–Look were expected to participate, but they withdrew shortly before the race. 106 of the 135 riders in the race finished.

UCI Women's WorldTeams

- Alé BTC Ljubljana
- Canyon//SRAM
- FDJ Nouvelle-Aquitaine Futuroscope
- Liv Racing
- Movistar Team
- SD Worx
- Team BikeExchange
- Team DSM
- Trek–Segafredo

UCI Women's Continental Teams

- A.R. Monex
- Bingoal Casino–Chevalmeire
- Ceratizit–WNT Pro Cycling
- Doltcini–Van Eyck–Proximus
- Drops–Le Col
- Lotto–Soudal Ladies
- Multum Accountants Ladies
- NXTG Racing
- Parkhotel Valkenburg
- Plantur–Pura
- Team Coop–Hitec Products
- Team Rupelcleaning–Champion Lubricants
- Top Girls Fassa Bortolo
- Valcar–Travel & Service

== Results ==
Result
Rank	Rider	Team	Time
1	Grace Brown (AUS)	Team BikeExchange	4h 03' 17"
2	Emma Norsgaard Jørgensen (DEN)	Movistar Team	+ 7"
3	Jolien D'Hoore (BEL)	SD Worx	+ 7"
4	Lotte Kopecky (BEL)	Liv Racing	+ 7"
5	Elisa Balsamo (ITA)	Valcar–Travel & Service	+ 7"
6	Kirsten Wild (NED)	Ceratizit–WNT Pro Cycling	+ 7"
7	Chloe Hosking (AUS)	Trek–Segafredo	+ 7"
8	Alice Barnes (GBR)	Canyon//SRAM	+ 7"
9	Amy Pieters (NED)	SD Worx	+ 7"
10	Julie Leth (DEN)	Ceratizit–WNT Pro Cycling	+ 7"
