= 2021 Donostia San Sebastián Klasikoa =

2021 Donostia San Sebastian Klasikoa
2021 UCI Women's World Tour, race 11 of 18

Race details
- Dates: 31 July 2021
- Stages: 1
- Distance: 139.8 km (86.9 mi)
- Winning time: 3h 53' 37"

Results
	Winner	Annemiek van Vleuten (NED)	(Movistar Team)
	Second	Ruth Winder (USA)	(Trek–Segafredo)
	Third	Tatiana Guderzo (ITA)	(Alé BTC Ljubljana)

The 2021 Donostia San Sebastian Klasikoa was a road cycling one-day race that took place on 31 July in San Sebastián, Spain. It was the second women's edition of the Clásica de San Sebastián. From 2022, the race was replaced by Itzulia Women.

The 139.8km route covered four categorised climbs, including the Jaizkibel around the 90km mark, a tough steep climb which has often played a pivotal role in deciding the men's race.

== Teams ==
Eighteen teams, each with a maximum of six riders, started the race:

UCI Women's WorldTeams

- Alé BTC Ljubljana
- Liv Racing
- FDJ Nouvelle-Aquitaine Futuroscope
- Team BikeExchange
- Movistar Team
- Trek–Segafredo

UCI Women's Continental Teams

- Ceratizit–WNT Pro Cycling
- A.R. Monex
- Valcar–Travel & Service
- Eneicat–RBH Global–Martín Villa
- Massi–Tactic
- Top Girls Fassa Bortolo
- Bizkaia–Durango
- Sopela Women's Team
- Río Miera–Cantabria Deporte
- Women Cycling Sport
- Team Farto-BTC
- Laboral Kutxa-Fundacion Euskadi

== Results ==
Result
Rank	Rider	Team	Time
1	Annemiek van Vleuten (NED)	Movistar Team	3h 53' 37"
2	Ruth Winder (USA)	Trek–Segafredo	+ 36"
3	Tatiana Guderzo (ITA)	Alé BTC Ljubljana	+ 1' 35"
4	Sabrina Stultiens (NED)	Liv Racing	s.t.
5	Evita Muzic (FRA)	FDJ Nouvelle-Aquitaine Futuroscope	s.t.
6	Brodie Chapman (AUS)	FDJ Nouvelle-Aquitaine Futuroscope	s.t.
7	Pauliena Rooijakkers (NED)	Liv Racing	+ 1' 38"
8	Audrey Cordon-Ragot (FRA)	Trek–Segafredo	+ 1' 52"
9	Erica Magnaldi (ITA)	Alé BTC Ljubljana	s.t.
10	Ellen van Dijk (NED)	Trek–Segafredo	s.t.

== See also ==
- 2021 in women's road cycling
