= Cycling at the 2024 Summer Olympics – Women's individual road race =

Women's individual road race at the Games of the XXXIII Olympiad
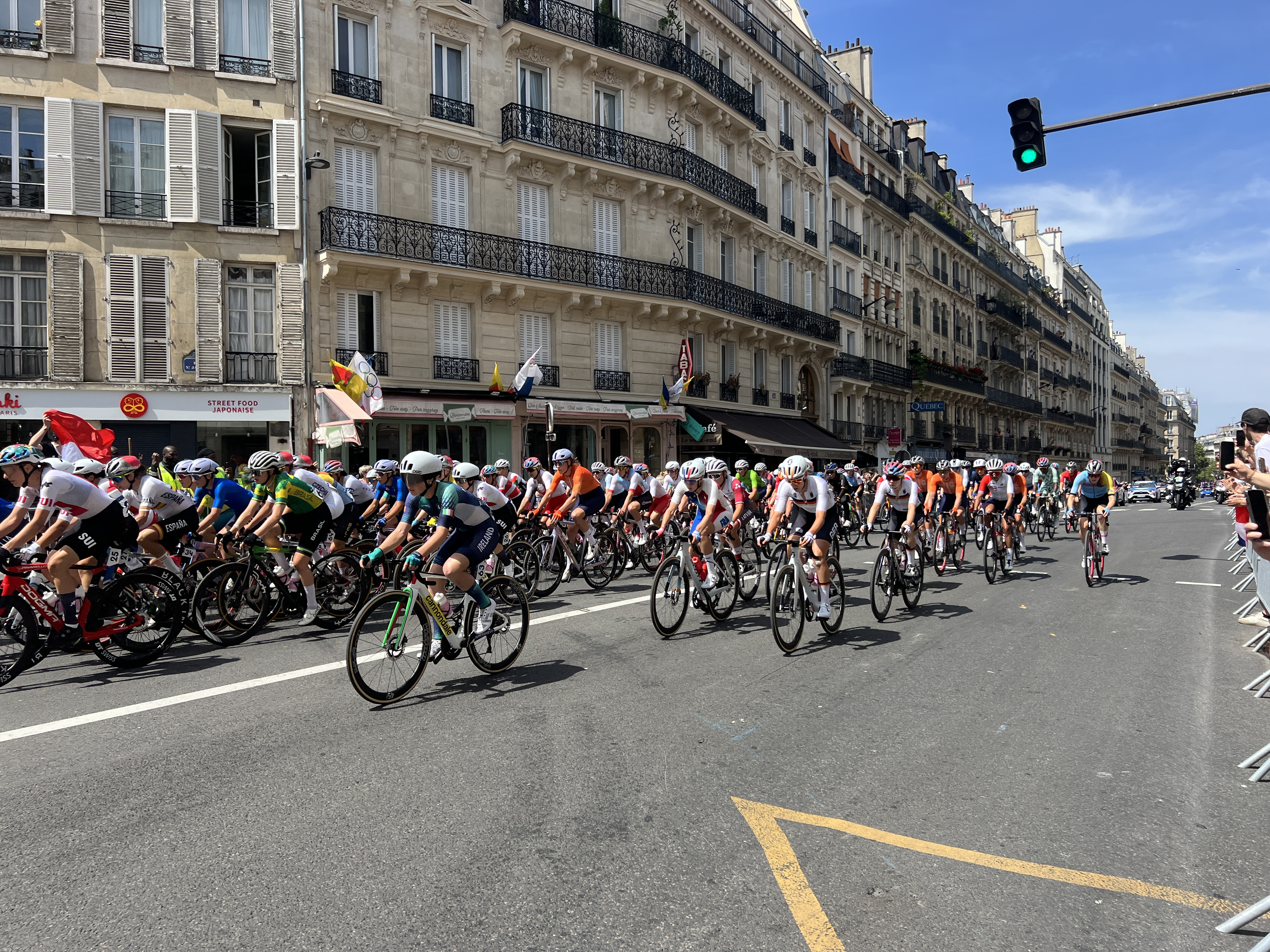
- The peloton on rue Gay-Lussac, shortly after the conclusion of the neutralised start.
- Venues: Pont d'Iéna
- Date: 4 August 2024

Medalists
1st place, gold medalist(s)		Kristen Faulkner	United States
2nd place, silver medalist(s)		Marianne Vos	Netherlands
3rd place, bronze medalist(s)		Lotte Kopecky	Belgium

The women's individual road race event at the 2024 Summer Olympics took place on 4 August 2024 on a course starting at 14:00 at Pont d'Iéna in Paris.

Kristen Faulkner, despite being a replacement in the 2024 Olympic team, became the first American to win a road racing gold in 40 years since Connie Carpenter at the road race in 1984.

== Background ==
This was the 11th appearance of the event, held every Summer Olympics since 1984.

== Competition format and course ==
The road race was a mass-start, one-day road race event over 157.6 km (97.9 mi) and 1,700 m (5,600 ft) of vertical gain. The race took in the Trocadero, Versailles and Auffargis, and then back to Paris, with two loops of the city and three climbs of Montmartre.

== Results ==
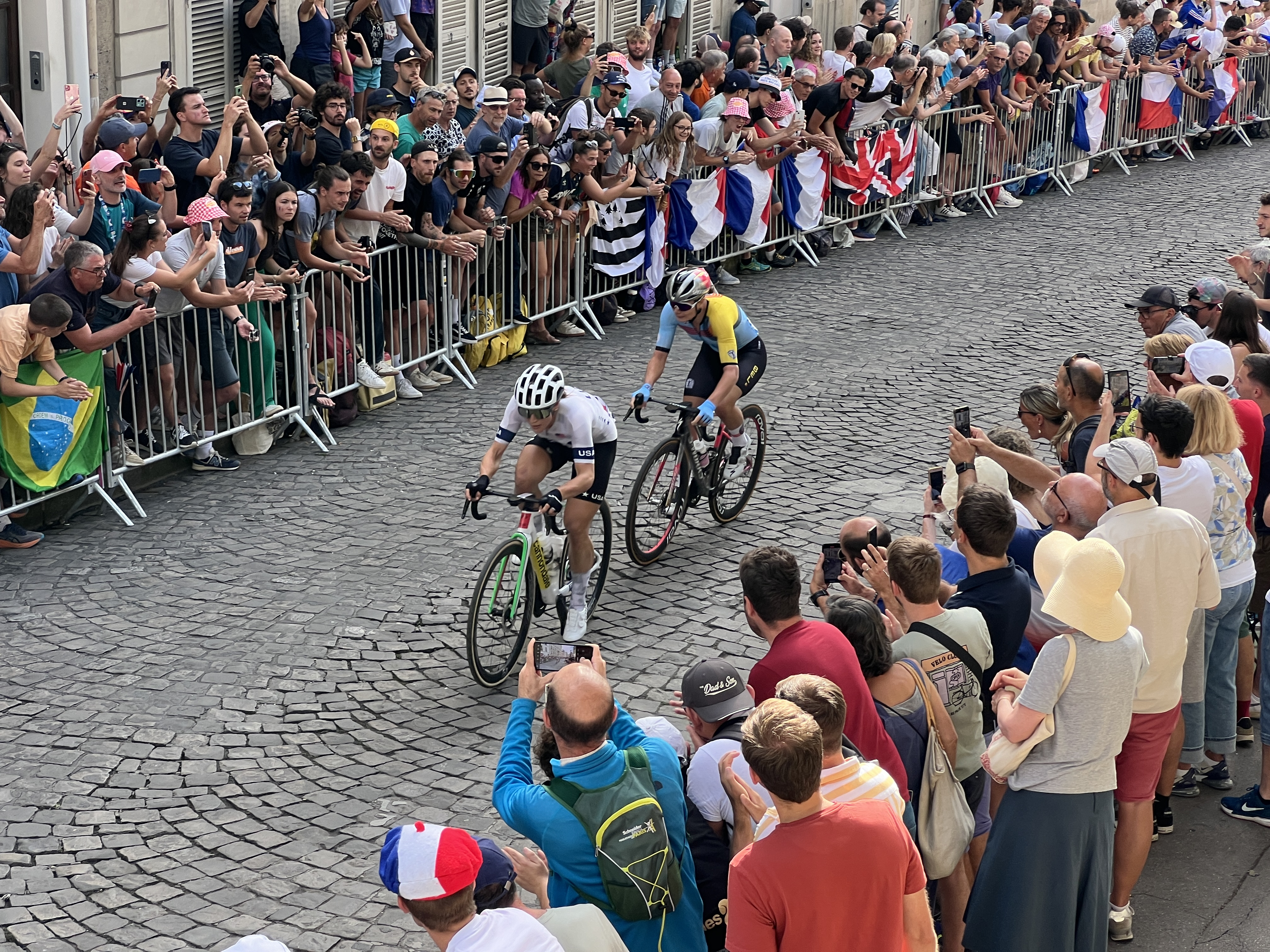
Kristen Faulker (left) and Lotte Kopecky

Rank	#	Cyclist	Nation	Time	Diff.
1st place, gold medalist(s)	33	Kristen Faulkner	United States	3:59:23	
2nd place, silver medalist(s)	9	Marianne Vos	Netherlands	4:00:21	+58
3rd place, bronze medalist(s)	3	Lotte Kopecky	Belgium	4:00:21	+58
4	73	Blanka Vas	Hungary	4:00:21	+58
5	29	Pfeiffer Georgi	Great Britain	4:00:44	+1:21
6	35	Mavi García	Spain	4:00:46	+1:23
7	26	Noemi Rüegg	Switzerland	4:01:27	+2:04
8	16	Katarzyna Niewiadoma	Poland	4:02:07	+2:44
9	13	Elisa Longo Borghini	Italy	4:02:28	+3:05
10	15	Marta Lach	Poland	4:02:50	+3:27
11	10	Lorena Wiebes	Netherlands	4:02:54	+3:31
12	28	Lizzie Deignan	Great Britain	4:02.57	+3:34
13	30	Anna Henderson	Great Britain	4:02:57	+3:34
14	71	Caroline Andersson	Sweden	4:02:57	+3:34
15	32	Chloé Dygert	United States	4:03:03	+3:40
16	37	Liane Lippert	Germany	4:03:27	+4:04
17	53	Christine Majerus	Luxembourg	4:04:23	+5:00
18	24	Elise Chabbey	Switzerland	4:04:23	+5:00
19	45	Alison Jackson	Canada	4:04:23	+5:00
20	78	Rasa Leleivytė	Lithuania	4:04:23	+5:00
21	51	Ingvild Gåskjenn	Norway	4:04:23	+5:00
22	22	Lauretta Hanson	Australia	4:04:23	+5:00
23	21	Grace Brown	Australia	4:04:23	+5:00
24	4	Justine Ghekiere	Belgium	4:04:23	+5:00
25	12	Elena Cecchini	Italy	4:04:23	+5:00
26	77	Eri Yonamine	Japan	4:04:23	+5:00
27	18	Victoire Berteau	France	4:04:23	+5:00
28	2	Christina Schweinberger	Austria	4:04:23	+5:00
29	41	Cecilie Uttrup Ludwig	Denmark	4:04:23	+5:00
30	50	Marte Berg Edseth	Norway	4:04:23	+5:00
31	43	Niamh Fisher-Black	New Zealand	4:04:23	+5:00
32	38	Antonia Niedermaier	Germany	4:04:23	+5:00
33	48	Ashleigh Moolman Pasio	South Africa	4:04:23	+5:00
34	8	Demi Vollering	Netherlands	4:04:23	+5:00
35	63	Megan Armitage	Ireland	4:06:58	+7:35
36	64	Julia Kopecký	Czech Republic	4:07:00	+7:37
37	49	Anniina Ahtosalo	Finland	4:07.04	+7:41
38	19	Audrey Cordon-Ragot	France	4:07.04	+7:41
39	23	Ruby Roseman-Gannon	Australia	4:07:12	+7:49
40	36	Franziska Koch	Germany	4:07:16	+7:53
41	81	Daniela Campos	Portugal	4:07:16	+7:53
42	59	Eugenia Bujak	Slovenia	4:07:16	+7:53
43	6	Margot Vanpachtenbeke	Belgium	4:07:16	+7:53
44	44	Olivia Baril	Canada	4:07:16	+7:53
45	17	Agnieszka Skalniak-Sójka	Poland	4:07:16	+7:53
46	20	Juliette Labous	France	4:07:16	+7:53
47	61	Tamara Dronova	Individual Neutral Athletes	4:07:16	+7:53
48	46	Arlenis Sierra	Cuba	4:07:16	+7:53
49	39	Emma Norsgaard	Denmark	4:07:16	+7:53
50	52	Paula Patiño	Colombia	4:07:16	+7:53
51	54	Yanina Kuskova	Uzbekistan	4:07:16	+7:53
52	1	Anna Kiesenhofer	Austria	4:07:16	+7:53
53	5	Julie Van de Velde	Belgium	4:07:21	+7:58
54	11	Elisa Balsamo	Italy	4:07:39	+8:16
55	14	Silvia Persico	Italy	4:07:39	+8:16
56	42	Kim Cadzow	New Zealand	4:08:14	+8:51
57	25	Elena Hartmann	Switzerland	4:08:14	+8:51
58	7	Ellen van Dijk	Netherlands	4:08:14	+8:51
59	60	Urša Pintar	Slovenia	4:08:14	+8:51
60	57	Catalina Soto	Chile	4:09:49	+10:26
61	70	Hanna Tserakh	Individual Neutral Athletes	4:10:18	+10:55
62	66	Antri Christoforou	Cyprus	4:10:20	+10:57
63	34	Mireia Benito	Spain	4:10:20	+10:57
64	65	Lee Sze Wing	Hong Kong	4:10:47	+11:24
65	27	Linda Zanetti	Switzerland	4:10:47	+11:24
66	75	Jelena Erić	Serbia	4:10:47	+11:24
67	69	Yuliia Biriukova	Ukraine	4:10:47	+11:24
68	82	Vera Looser	Namibia	4:10:47	+11:24
69	83	Anastasia Carbonari	Latvia	4:10:47	+11:24
70	55	Olga Zabelinskaya	Uzbekistan	4:10:47	+11:24
71	79	Nora Jenčušová	Slovakia	4:10:47	+11:24
72	62	Alena Ivanchenko	Individual Neutral Athletes	4:10:47	+11:24
73	80	Nguyễn Thị Thật	Vietnam	4:10:47	+11:24
74	68	Ana Vitória Magalhães	Brazil	4:10:47	+11:24
75	90	Fariba Hashimi	Afghanistan	4:10:47	+11:24
76	40	Rebecca Koerner	Denmark	4:12:22	+12:59
77	85	Rotem Gafinovitz	Israel	4:13:42	+14:19
78	67	Phetdarin Somrat	Thailand	4:13:42	+14:19
	47	Tiffany Keep	South Africa	DNF	
	56	Kimberley Le Court	Mauritius	DNF	
	58	Tang Xin	China	DNF	
	72	Song Min-ji	South Korea	DNF	
	74	Nesrine Houili	Algeria	DNF	
	76	Marcela Prieto	Mexico	DNF	
	84	Safia Al-Sayegh	United Arab Emirates	DNF	
	86	Milagro Mena	Costa Rica	DNF	
	87	Nur Aisyah Mohamad Zubir	Malaysia	DNF	
	88	Ese Ukpeseraye	Nigeria	DNF	
	89	Awa Bamogo	Burkina Faso	DNF	
	91	Yulduz Hashimi	Afghanistan	DNF	
	92	Diane Ingabire	Rwanda	DNF	
	93	Eyeru Gebru	Refugee Olympic Team	DNF	
