= Lonneke Uneken =

Dutch cyclist

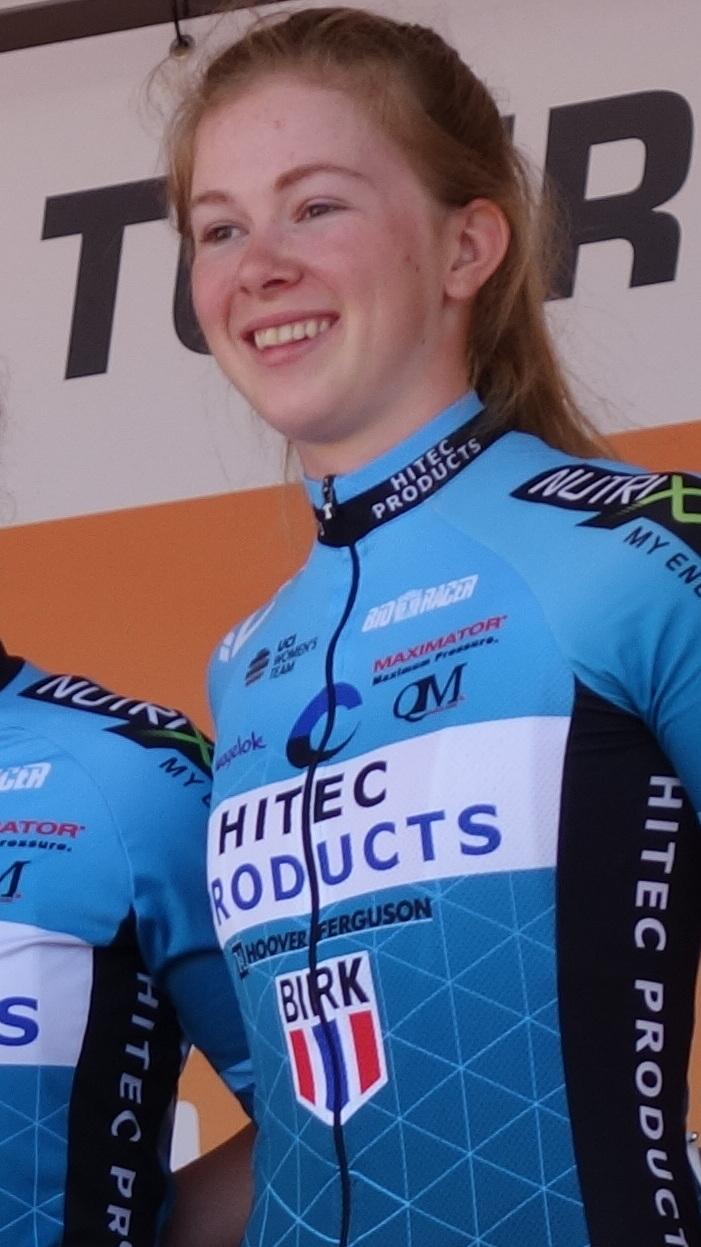
- Uneken in 2019

Personal information
- Full name: Lonneke Uneken
- Born: 2 March 2000 (age 26) Winschoten, Netherlands

Cycling career
- Sport: Cycling
- Current team: VolkerWessels Women Cyclingteam
- Discipline: Road
- Role: Rider

Professional teams
- 2019: Hitec Products–Birk Sport
- 2020–2024: Boels–Dolmans
- 2025–: VolkerWessels Women Cyclingteam
Medal record
Representing Netherlands
Women's track cycling
European Championships
Bronze medal – third place	2021 Grenchen	Points race

Lonneke Uneken (born 2 March 2000) is a Dutch professional racing cyclist, who currently rides for UCI Women's ProTeam VolkerWessels Women Cyclingteam.

== Major results ==
2017
5th Gent–Wevelgem Juniors
2018
2nd Gent–Wevelgem Juniors
3rd Overall Healthy Ageing Tour Juniors

1st Points classification
1st Stages 1 & 3

3rd Road race, National Junior Road Championships
4th Overall Watersley Ladies Challenge
2019
3rd Road race, UEC European Under-23 Road Championships
3rd Flanders Ladies Classic
5th GP Stad Roeselare Juniors
6th Omloop van de IJsseldelta
9th Road race, National Under–23 Road Championships
2020
2nd Road race, UEC European Under-23 Road Championships
7th Le Samyn des Dames
2021
1st Stage 3 Holland Ladies Tour
4th Overall Healthy Ageing Tour

1st Mountains classification
1st Stage 3

6th Drentse Acht van Westerveld
6th Dwars door het Hagel and Women
10th Overall BeNe Ladies Tour

1st Points classification
1st Stage 3

2022
1st Stage 2 Bloeizone Fryslân Tour
4th Classic Brugge–De Panne
2023
1st Stages 1 (TTT) & 4 Thüringen Ladies Tour
3rd Volta Limburg Classic
2025
10th Antwerp Port Epic
