= Kristen Faulkner =

American racing cyclist (born 1992)

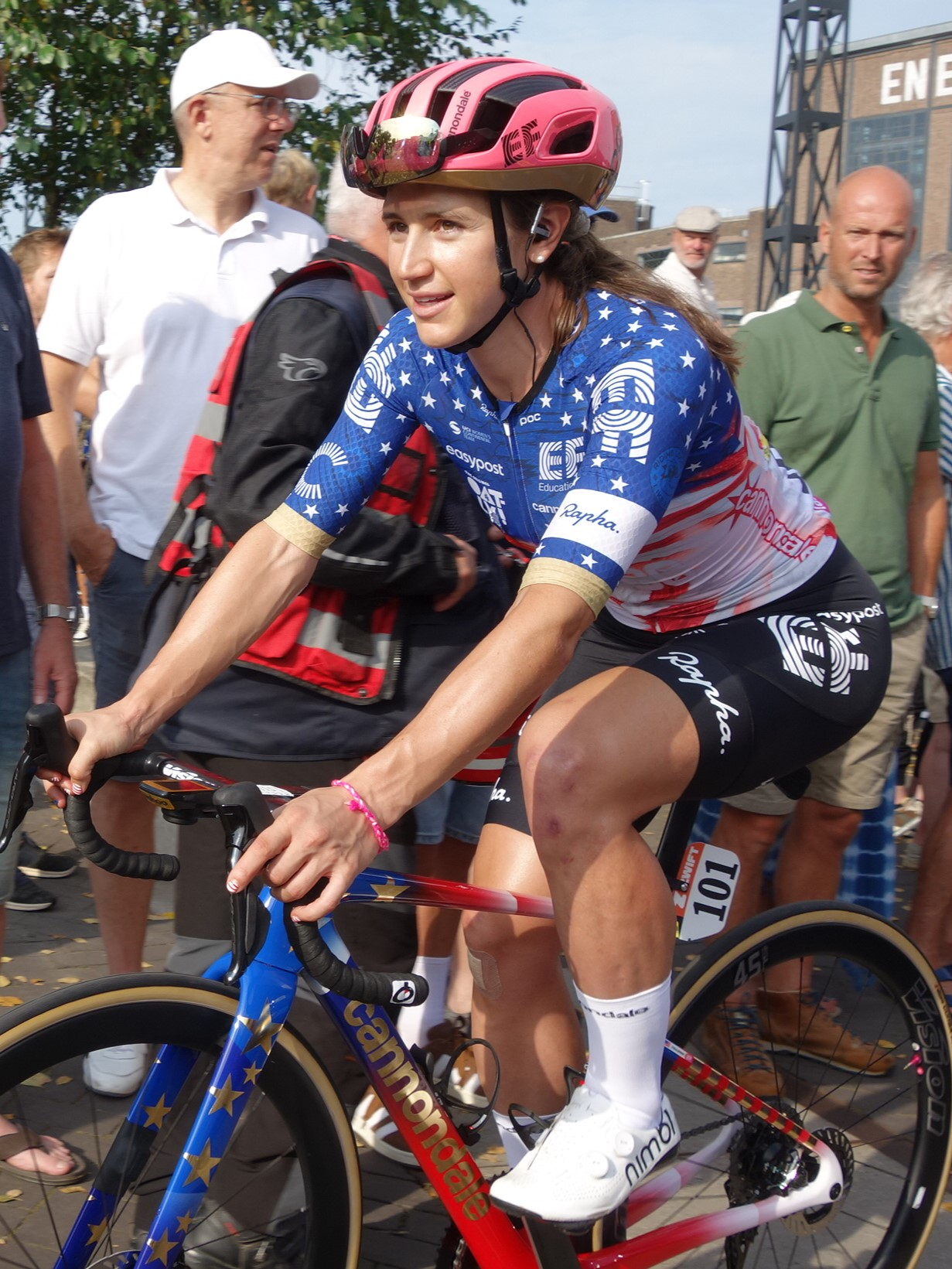
- Faulkner in 2024

Personal information
- Full name: Kristen Faulkner
- Nickname: "Faulks"
- Born: December 18, 1992 (age 33) Homer, Alaska, U.S.
- Height: 5 ft 6 in (168 cm)

Cycling career
- Sport: Cycling
- Current team: EF Education–Oatly
- Disciplines: Road and Track
- Role: Rider
- Rider type: Time-trialist (Road); Team pursuit (Track)

Amateur teams
- 2017–2018: Century Road Club Association; Dave Jordan Racing
- 2019: JLVelo
- 2019: Revolution Racing p/b Jakroo

Professional teams
- 2020–2021: Tibco–Silicon Valley Bank
- 2022–2023: Team BikeExchange–Jayco
- 2024–: EF Education–Oatly

Major wins
- Road Major Tours Giro d'Italia Mountains classification (2022) 2 individual stages (2022) La Vuelta Femenina 1 individual stage (2024) One-day races and Classics Olympic Games Road Race (2024) National Road Race Championships (2024, 2025) Track Olympic Games Team pursuit (2024)
Medal record
Representing the United States
Olympic Games
Women's Road bicycle racing
Gold medal – first place	2024 Paris	Road race
Women's Track cycling
Gold medal – first place	2024 Paris	Team pursuit
Pan American Championships
Gold medal – first place	2026 Santiago	Team pursuit
Gold medal – first place	2026 Santiago	Individual pursuit
Pan American Games
Gold medal – first place	2023 Santiago	Time trial

Kristen Faulkner (born December 18, 1992) is an American racing cyclist who rides for UCI Women's WorldTeam EF Education–Oatly. She is a two-time USA National Road Race Champion and won two gold medals in the women's individual road race and women's track cycling team pursuit at the 2024 Paris Olympics. Faulkner was the first American woman, and third female Olympian, in history to win two gold medals in two different disciplines in the same Olympic Games.

== Early life and education ==
Faulkner was born in Homer, Alaska to parents Sara and Jon Faulkner, owners and operators of a resort in the city. She grew up in the Alaskan fishing community along with four siblings, Katie, Andrew, William, and Nicholas.

Faulker attended Phillips Academy in Massachusetts, where she was a varsity runner, swimmer, and rower. She graduated from Harvard University in 2016 with a B.A in computer science, where she competed in varsity rowing. She holds the university's record for fastest 2k indoor rowing time for lightweight women.

== Career ==
Faulkner began competitive cycling in New York City in 2017 while she was working as an investment associate at Bessemer Venture Partners. She moved to the San Francisco Bay Area in 2018 and joined Team Tibco–Silicon Valley Bank in 2020. During her first year cycling professionally, she worked full-time as an investment associate at Threshold Ventures, an early stage venture capital firm in Silicon Valley. She won the women's road time trial at the 2023 Pan American Games. In October 2023, it was announced that Faulkner would join the UCI Women's Continental Team EF Education–Oatly for the 2024 season.

Faulkner had a strong start to the 2024 season with her new team. She won the Omloop van het Hageland and Stage 4 of La Vuelta Feminina. In May, she won the road race and finished second in the time trial at the United States National Road Race Championships. She was then selected to join Chloé Dygert in the road race and team pursuit at the 2024 Summer Olympics.

Faulkner, despite being a replacement on the 2024 Olympic team, was the first American to win a road racing gold medal in 40 years when she took first place in the women's road race. Faulkner finished the 158-kilometer race 58 seconds ahead of the silver and bronze medalists, who ended the race in a photo finish.

Faulkner also won the gold medal in women's team pursuit in track cycling alongside Chloé Dygert, Jennifer Valente, and Lily Williams. It was the first team track cycling gold medal in U.S. history. Faulkner became the first American woman and third female Olympian, after Leontien van Moorsel and Ester Ledecká, to win an Olympic gold medal in two different disciplines in the same Olympic Games.

== Major results ==
2020 (1 pro win)
1st Super Sweetwater, Grasshopper Adventure Series
1st Stage 4 Tour Cycliste Féminin International de l'Ardèche
2021 (1)
3rd Overall Tour of Norway

1st Stage 1

3rd GP de Plouay
7th Gent–Wevelgem
10th Tour of Flanders
2022 (3)
Giro Donne

1st Mountains classification
1st Prologue & Stage 9

2nd Overall Tour de Suisse

1st Stage 2 (ITT)

3rd Overall Itzulia Women
3rd Navarra Elite Classics
4th Emakumeen Nafarroako Klasikoa
6th UCI Road World Championships – Women's time trial
2023 (1)
1st Time trial, Pan American Games
2024 (7)
Olympic Games

1st Road race
1st Team pursuit

National Championships

1st Road race
2nd Time trial

1st Omloop van het Hageland
1st Stage 4 La Vuelta Feminina
2nd Overall Trofeo Ponente in Rosa

1st Points classification
1st Mountains classification
1st Stages 2 & 3

6th Strade Bianche
2025 (1)
National Championships

1st Road race
2nd Time trial

2026 (1)
1st Time trial, Pan American Road Championships
