= Grace Brown (cyclist) =

Australian cyclist (born 1992)

Grace Brown OAM
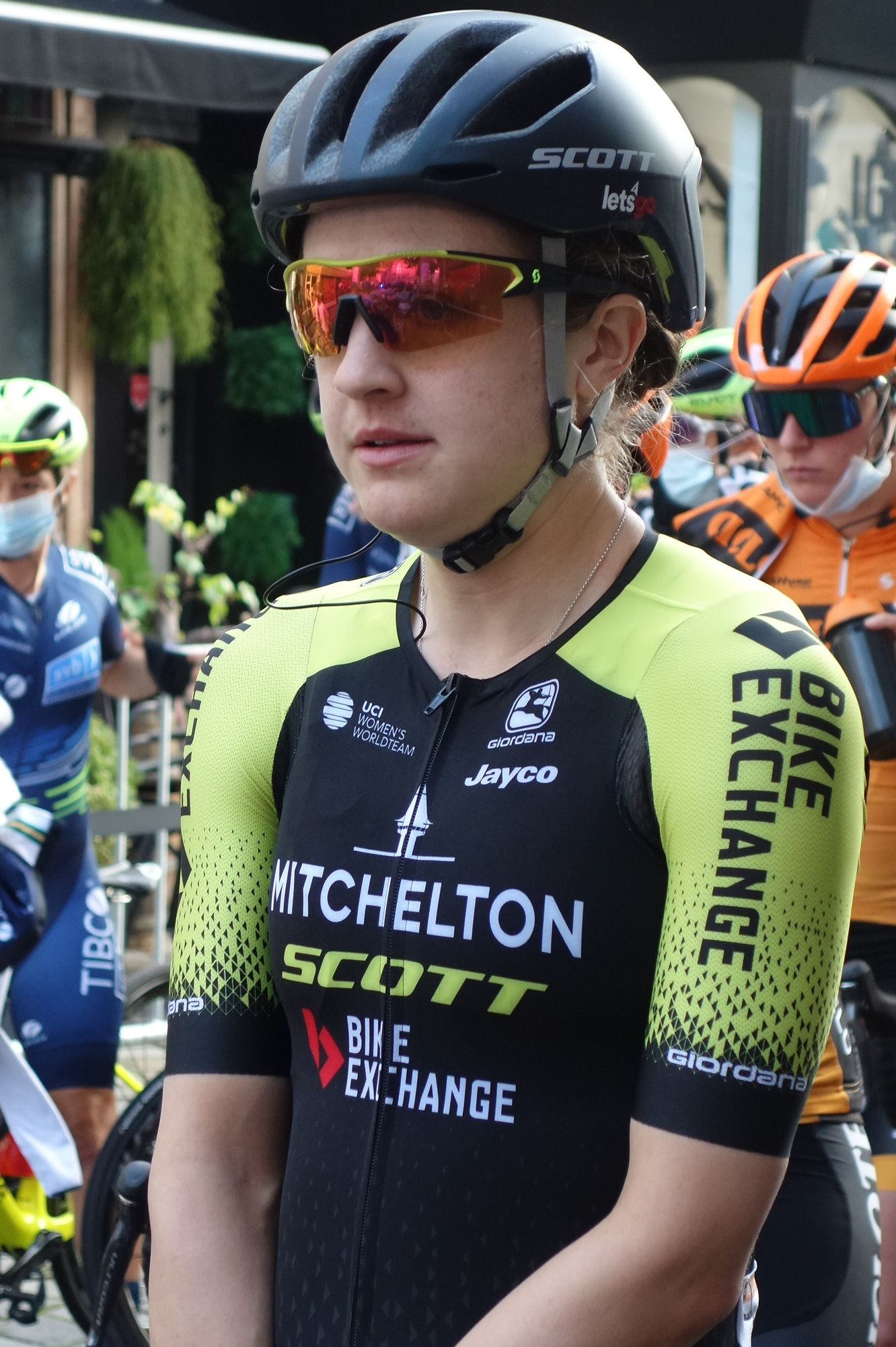
- Brown at the 2020 Flèche Wallonne

Personal information
- Nicknames: Milawa; GB
- Born: 7 July 1992 (age 34) Camperdown, Victoria, Australia
- Height: 168 cm (66 in)

Cycling career
- Sport: Cycling
- Discipline: Road
- Role: Rider
- Rider type: All-rounder

Amateur teams
- 2015–2016: St Kilda Cycling Club
- 2016: Route 33
- 2017–2018: Holden Team Gusto Racing

Professional teams
- 2018: Wiggle High5
- 2019–2021: Mitchelton–Scott
- 2022–2024: FDJ Nouvelle-Aquitaine Futuroscope

Major wins
- One-day races and Classics Olympic Games Time Trial (2024) World Time Trial Championships (2024) National Time Trial Championships (2019, 2022–2024) Liège–Bastogne–Liège (2024) Classic Brugge–De Panne (2021) Brabantse Pijl (2020)
Medal record
Representing Australia
Women's road bicycle racing
Olympic Games
Gold medal – first place	2024 Paris	Time trial
Commonwealth Games
Gold medal – first place	2022 Birmingham	Time trial
World Championships
Gold medal – first place	2024 Zurich	Time trial
Gold medal – first place	2024 Zurich	Mixed team relay
Silver medal – second place	2022 Wollongong	Time trial
Silver medal – second place	2023 Stirling	Time trial

Grace Brown (born 7 July 1992) is a former Australian road racing cyclist, specialising in road time trialling, who last rode for UCI Women's WorldTeam FDJ United–Suez. In her final year of professional cycling, Brown won the women's individual time trial event at the 2024 Paris Olympics, the same event at the 2024 UCI World Road Cycling Championships and her fourth time trial title at the Australian Road Cycling Championships. She just missed out on a medal in the Tokyo 2020 Olympics women's time trial, finishing fourth. She also competed in the women's road race where she came 47th. She also won the monument classic Liege-Bastogne-Liege Femmes in the same year, and the time trial at the 2022 Commonwealth Games.

== Career ==
=== 2015–2018 seasons ===
Brown started cycling in 2015 after previously being involved in running. She started 2018 riding for Holden Team Gusto Racing. She then joined British UCI team Wiggle High5 for the latter part of 2018 season after being selected as the recipient of the Amy Gillett Cycling Scholarship. Her first race for Wiggle High5 was the Tour of California, a UCI Women's World Tour event, that was held in mid-May.

=== 2019–2020 seasons ===
Brown joined the Mitchelton–Scott team at the start of the 2019 season. She had a good start to the 2019 season winning the Australian National Time Trial Championships and a stage at the Tour Down Under. She achieved her first major victory in Europe in the autumn of 2020 winning Brabantse Pijl in a solo breakaway. She was awarded AusCycling's Female Road Cyclist of the Year award for 2020.

=== 2021 season ===
Brown started the 2021 season in Australia with second places in both the road race and time trial at the National Championships.

Brown had strong results in the 2021 Spring classics. She achieved her first victory in the Women's World Tour at Brugge-De Panne. She was also second at Nokere Koerse and third at the Tour of Flanders. She was selected in the Australian team to compete in the road race and time trial at the Tokyo Olympics. She finished fourth in the time trial.

In August 2021 Brown signed a two-year contract with French Women's WorldTeam FDJ Nouvelle-Aquitaine Futuroscope. She ended the 2021 season early to have shoulder surgery.

=== 2024 season ===
Brown won the Liège-Bastogne-Liège Femmes in April. In June 2024 Brown announced her plan to retire from professional cycling at the end of the 2024 season and in the following month she won the Olympic time trial on very wet Parisian roads. In September, she won the time trial at the World Championships, becoming the first cyclist to win both the Olympic and World championship time trial races in the same season.

=== Post-cycling career ===
Brown was elected as president of The Cyclists' Alliance in October 2024.

Brown has worked as a commentator for SBS TV's cycling broadcasts in Australia. She also contributes a weekly podcast to SBS titled "Unclipped". In May 2025 she was named as race director for the women's version of a proposed revival of the Herald Sun Tour

== Major results ==
2017
Oceania Continental Road Championships

5th Time trial
5th Road race

2018
Oceania Continental Road Championships

1st Time trial
2nd Road race

National Road Championships

3rd Road race
4th Time trial

5th Overall Tour Down Under
9th Overall Herald Sun Tour
2019
1st Time trial, National Road Championships
1st Stage 3 Tour Down Under
8th Overall Herald Sun Tour
10th Cadel Evans Great Ocean Road Race
2020
1st Brabantse Pijl
National Road Championships

2nd Time trial
3rd Road race

2nd Liège–Bastogne–Liège
5th UCI Road World Championships – Women's time trial
2021
1st Classic Brugge–De Panne
National Road Championships

2nd Road race
2nd Time trial

2nd Nokere Koerse
3rd Tour of Flanders
4th Clasica Femenina Navarra
4th Time trial, Olympic Games
5th La Course by Le Tour de France
6th Dwars door Vlaanderen
7th Overall Vuelta a Burgos

1st Stage 1

8th Omloop Het Nieuwsblad
2022
1st Time trial, Commonwealth Games
National Road Championships

1st Time trial
2nd Road race

1st La Périgord
1st Stage 3 Ceratizit Challenge by La Vuelta
2nd UCI Road World Championships – Women's time trial
2nd Overall The Women's Tour

1st Stage 4

2nd Liège–Bastogne–Liège
3rd Classic Lorient Agglomération
3rd GP de Plumelec-Morbihan
4th La Classique Morbihan
5th Overall Setmana Ciclista Valenciana
7th Tour of Flanders
2023
National Road Championships

1st Time trial
2nd Road race

1st Overall Tour Down Under

1st Points classification
1st Stage 3

1st Overall Bretagne Ladies Tour

1st Stage 3 (ITT)

1st GP de Plumelec-Morbihan
2nd UCI Road World Championships – Women's time trial
5th Overall Tour of Scandinavia

1st Stage 4 (ITT)

6th Amstel Gold Race
6th Overall Tour féminin international des Pyrénées
2024
1st Time trial, Olympic Games
1st UCI Road World Championships – Women's time trial
1st UCI Road World Championships – Mixed team relay
National Road Championships

1st Time trial
4th Road race

1st Overall Bretagne Ladies Tour

1st Stage 1 (ITT) & 3

1st Liège–Bastogne–Liège
5th Deakin University Road Race

=== Classics results timeline ===
Monuments results timeline
Monument	2017	2018	2019	2020	2021	2022	2023	2024
Tour of Flanders	—	—	—	14	3	7	23	—
Paris–Roubaix	Did not exist			NH	—	12	13	61
Liège–Bastogne–Liège	—	—	—	2	—	2	46	1

=== Major championship results timeline ===
Event		2017	2018	2019	2020	2021	2022	2023	2024
Olympic Games	Time trial	Not held				4	Not held		1
Olympic Games	Road race	Not held				47	Not held		23
World Championships	Time trial	—	—	—	5	—	2	2	1
World Championships	Road race	—	48	—	91	—	35	24	30
Oceanian Championships	Time trial	5	1	—	Not held		—	—	—
Oceanian Championships	Road race	5	2	—	Not held		—	—	—
Commonwealth Games	Time trial	NH	—	Not held			1	Not held	
Commonwealth Games	Road race	NH	—	Not held			33	Not held	
National Championships	Time trial	—	4	1	2	2	1	1	1
National Championships	Road race	—	3	12	3	2	2	2	4

Legend
—	Did not compete
DNF	Did not finish
NH	Not held
DNE	Did not exist
