= Mavi García =

Spanish cyclist (born 1984)

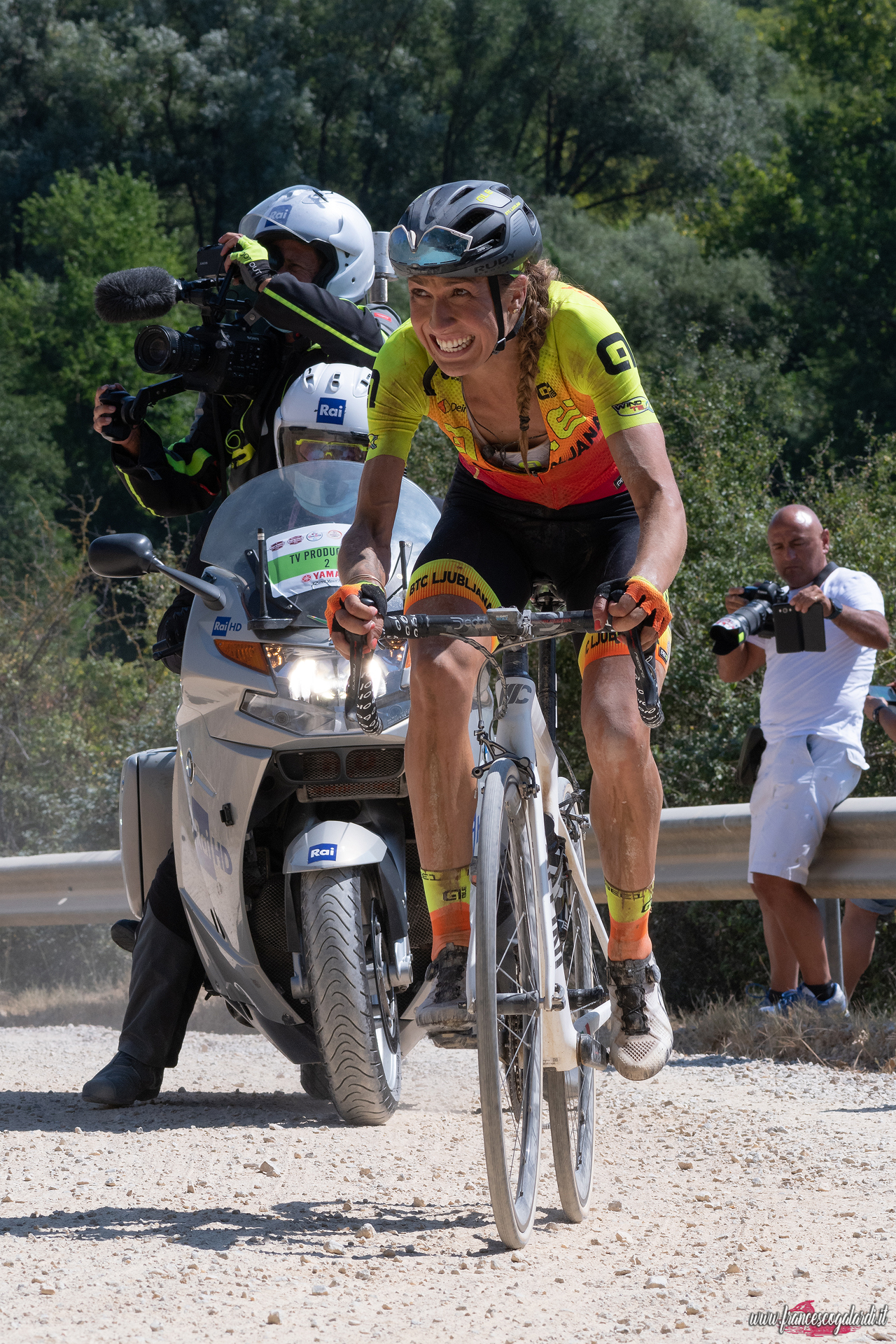
- García at the Strade Bianche 2020

Personal information
- Full name: Margarita Victoria García Cañellas
- Nickname: Mavi
- Born: 2 January 1984 (age 42) Palma de Mallorca, Spain
- Height: 173 cm (5 ft 8 in)

Cycling career
- Sport: Cycling
- Current team: UAE Team L'Imad
- Discipline: Road
- Role: Rider

Professional teams
- 2015–2017: Bizkaia–Durango
- 2018–2019: Movistar Team
- 2020–2022: Alé BTC Ljubljana
- 2023–2025: Team Jayco–AlUla
- 2026–: UAE Team L'Imad

Major wins
- Major Tours Tour de France 1 individual stage (2025) One-day races and Classics National Road Race Championships (2016, 2020, 2021, 2022, 2023) National Time Trial Championships (2018, 2020, 2021, 2022)
Medal record
Women's road bicycle racing
Representing Spain
World Championships
Bronze medal – third place	2025 Kigali	Road race

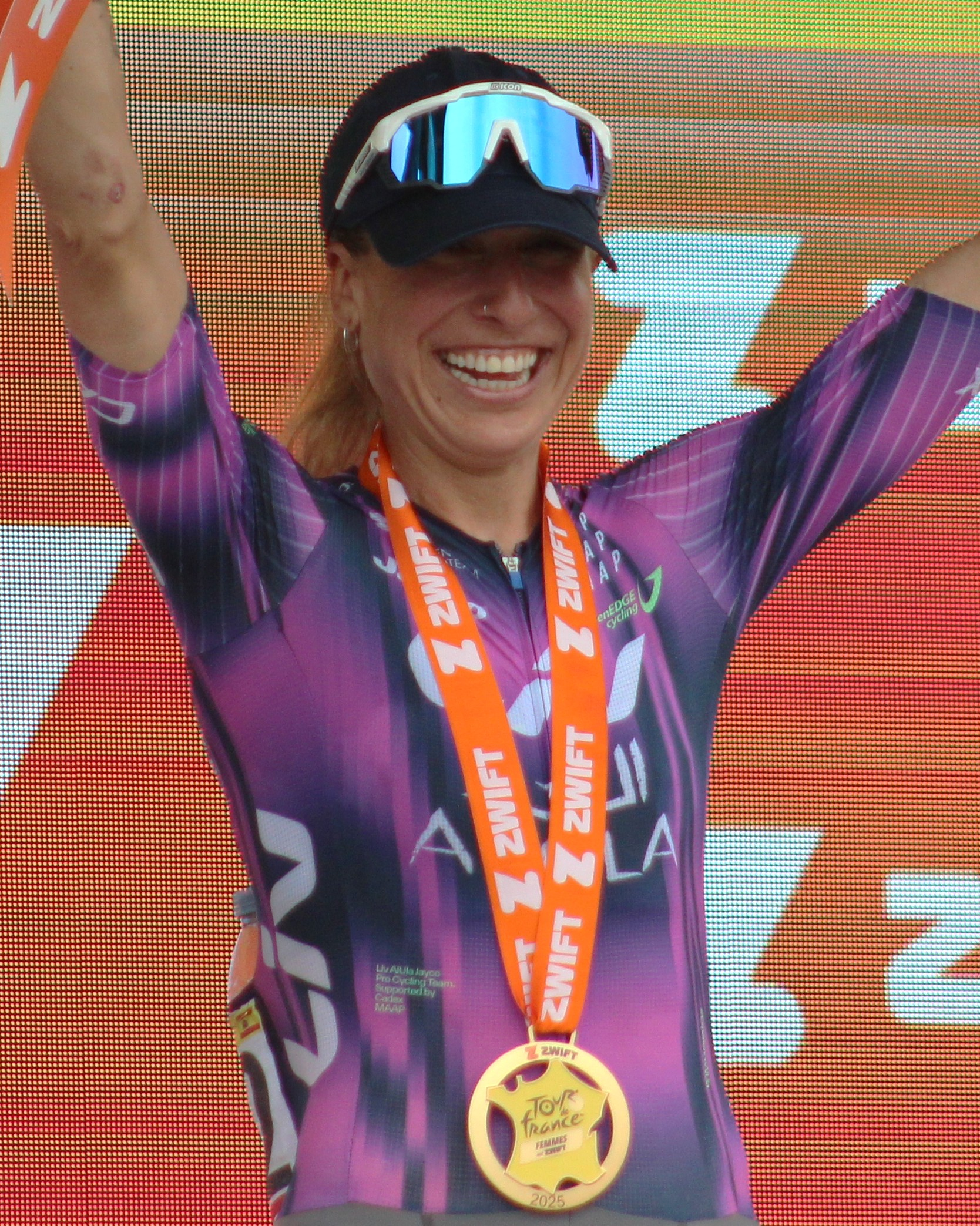
Mavi García celebrating her stage win at the 2025 Tour de France Femmes

Margarita Victoria "Mavi" García Cañellas (born 2 January 1984) is a Spanish professional racing cyclist and duathlete, who currently rides for UCI Women's WorldTeam UAE Team L'Imad. In July 2025 García won the second stage of the Tour de France, becoming the oldest woman to win a stage of the Tour de France Femmes.

== Major results ==
2015
1st Zalla
2nd Sopelana
3rd Overall Gipuzkoako Emakumeen Itzulia
4th Larrabasterra
2016
National Road Championships

1st Road race
3rd Time trial

1st Overall Vuelta a Burgos

1st Stage 1

1st Gran Premio Comunidad de Cantabria
1st Trofeo Gobierno de La Rioja
1st Trofeo Ria de Marin
1st Zizurkil-Villabona Sari Nagusia
2nd 94.7 Cycle Challenge
KZN Summer Series

2nd Queen Nandi Challenge
8th Queen Sibiya Classic

6th Overall Tour Cycliste Féminin International de l'Ardèche
2017
1st Trofeo Gobierno de La Rioja
National Road Championships

2nd Time trial
2nd Road race

2nd Gran Premio Ciudad de Alcobendas
2nd Gran Premio Costa Blanca Calpe
3rd Gran Premio Comunidad de Cantabria
5th Overall Tour Cycliste Féminin International de l'Ardèche
5th Trofeo Roldan
7th Emakumeen Aiztondo Sari Nagusia
7th Trofeo Ciudad de Caspe
9th Durango-Durango Emakumeen Saria
2018
National Road Championships

1st Time trial
3rd Road race

1st Gran Premio Comunidad de Cantabria
2nd Overall Tour Cycliste Féminin International de l'Ardèche
6th Overall Setmana Ciclista Valenciana
8th Ladies Tour of Norway TTT
9th Open de Suède Vårgårda TTT
10th La Flèche Wallonne
2019
2nd Overall Women's Tour de Yorkshire

1st Mountains Classification

2nd Grand Prix de Plumelec-Morbihan Dames
3rd Overall Vuelta a Burgos Feminas
5th Overall Emakumeen Euskal Bira
6th Overall Tour Cycliste Féminin International de l'Ardèche
10th La Flèche Wallonne
10th Mixed team relay, UCI Road World Championships
2020
National Road Championships

1st Road race
1st Time trial

2nd Strade Bianche
2nd Overall Tour Cycliste Féminin International de l'Ardèche

1st Stages 1 & 2

2nd Emakumeen Nafarroako Klasikoa
2nd Durango-Durango Emakumeen Saria
9th Overall Giro Rosa
9th Brabantse Pijl
2021
National Road Championships

1st Time trial
1st Road race

1st Giro dell'Emilia
2nd Overall Setmana Ciclista Valenciana
2nd Overall Tour Cycliste Féminin International de l'Ardèche
5th La Flèche Wallonne
6th Trofeo Alfredo Binda
6th Amstel Gold Race
2022
National Road Championships

1st Time trial
1st Road race

1st Classic Lorient Agglomération
1st Stage 3 Vuelta a Burgos Feminas
5th La Flèche Wallonne
6th Amstel Gold Race
9th Overall Setmana Ciclista Valenciana
3rd Overall Giro Donne
10th Overall Tour de France

Combativity award Stage 8

2023
National Road Championships

1st Road race
2nd Time trial

4th La Flèche Wallonne
7th Overall Giro Donne
9th Overall La Vuelta Femenina
10th Road race, UCI Road World Championships
10th Trofeo Alfredo Binda
2024
1st Overall Vuelta a Andalucía

1st Points classification
1st Stage 2

National Road Championships

3rd Road race
3rd Time trial

3rd Overall UAE Tour
4th Overall Itzulia
3rd Trofeo Palma
5th Overall Tour de Romandie
6th Road race, Olympic Games
6th Trofeo Binissalem-Andratx
2025
1st Stage 2 Tour de France
2nd Trofeo Palma
3rd Road race, UCI Road World Championships
5th Trofeo Binissalem-Andratx
5th Strade Bianche
2026
2nd Tour Down Under
