= Sofia Bertizzolo =

Italian racing cyclist (born 1997)

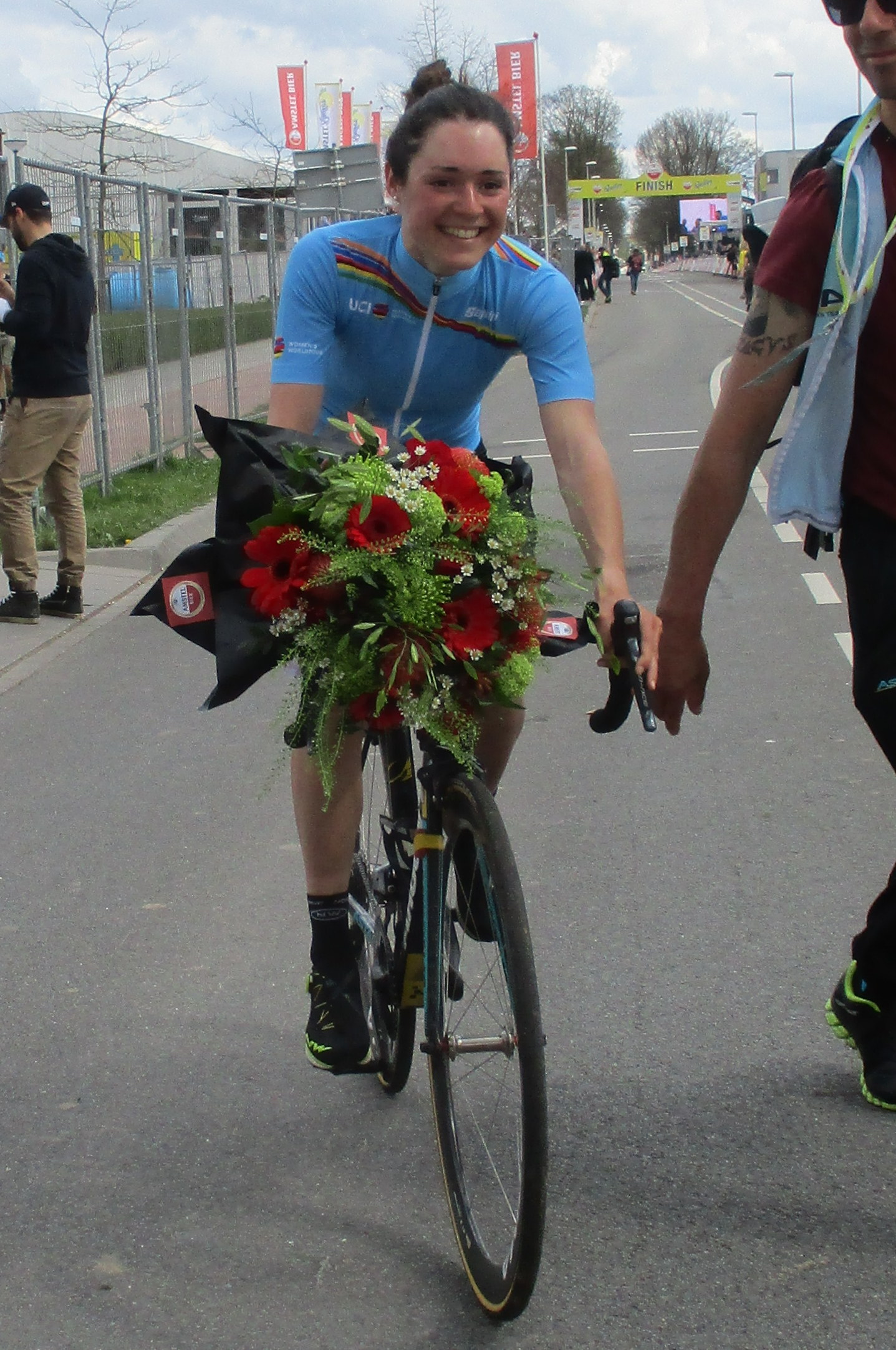
- Bertizzolo at the 2018 Amstel Gold Race

Personal information
- Full name: Sofia Bertizzolo
- Born: 21 August 1997 (age 29) Bassano del Grappa, Italy

Cycling career
- Sport: Cycling
- Current team: UAE Team L'Imad
- Discipline: Road
- Role: Rider

Amateur team
- Fiamme Oro

Professional teams
- 2016–2018: Astana
- 2019: Team Virtu Cycling
- 2020–2021: Liv Racing
- 2022–: UAE Team ADQ

Sofia Bertizzolo (born 21 August 1997) is an Italian professional racing cyclist, who currently rides for UCI Women's WorldTeam UAE Team L'Imad.

== Major results ==
2014
UEC Junior Road European Championships

1st Road race
6th Time trial

National Junior Road Championships

1st Road race
2nd Time trial

2015
1st Trofeo Da Moreno - Piccolo Trofeo Alfredo Binda
2nd Road race, National Junior Road Championships
9th Road race, UEC Junior Road Championships
2016
4th GP della Liberazione
7th Overall Giro Toscana Int. Femminile - Memorial Michela Fanini
2017
4th Gran Premio Bruno Beghelli Internazionale Donne Elite
5th Overall Vuelta Internacional Femenina a Costa Rica
8th Giro dell'Emilia Internazionale Donne Elite
2018
1st Young rider classification, UCI Women's World Tour
1st Overall Giro delle Marche in Rosa
1st Young rider classification, Giro Rosa
1st Mountains classification Festival Elsy Jacobs
2nd Road race, National Road Championships
4th Winston Salem Cycling Classic
7th Overall Giro Toscana Int. Femminile - Memorial Michela Fanini

1st Mountains classification

8th La Flèche Wallonne Féminine
2019
4th Tour of Flanders
2020
5th Three Days of Bruges–De Panne
2021
1st La Classique Morbihan
4th GP de Plouay
8th Trofeo Alfredo Binda
8th Navarra Women's Elite Classics
10th La Course by Le Tour de France
2022
1st Trofeo Oro in Euro
2nd Trofeo Alfredo Binda
3rd Giro dell'Emilia Internazionale Donne Elite
5th Overall Grand Prix Elsy Jacobs
9th Overall The Women's Tour
9th Brabantse Pijl
10th Amstel Gold Race
2023
Tour de Romandie

1st Points classification
1st Stage 1

3rd Classic Lorient Agglomération
3rd La Classique Morbihan
4th Grand Prix du Morbihan Féminin
4th Grand Prix de Wallonie
6th Konvert Koerse
7th Giro dell'Emilia Internazionale Donne Elite
9th Omloop van Borsele
2024
1st Sprints classification, Tour Down Under
2025
5th Schwalbe Women's One Day Classic
10th Copenhagen Sprint
