= Movistar Team (women's team) =

Spanish cycling team

Team information
- UCI code: MOV
- Registered: Spain
- Founded: 2017
- Discipline: Road
- Status: UCI Women's Team (2018–2019); UCI Women's World Team (2020–present)
- Bicycles: Canyon
- Components: SRAM
- Website: Team home page

Key personnel
- General manager: Sebastián Unzue
- Team manager: Pablo Lastras

Team name history
- 2018–: Movistar Team

Movistar Team is a Spanish professional road bicycle racing women's team which participates in elite women's races. The title sponsor is the Spanish mobile telephone company Telefónica, with the team riding under the name of the company's brand Movistar.

== History ==
In September 2017, Movistar Team announced it would join the likes of Team Sunweb, Orica–Scott, FDJ and Astana in the creation of a predominantly Spanish women's team aimed at developing women's cycling within Spain.

In early October 2017, the inaugural roster was announced: Mavi García, Spanish national time trial champion – Lourdes Oyarbide and Lorena Llamas joining from BZK Emakumeen Bira. Alicia González Blanco, Eider Merino Cortazar and Alba Teruel Ribes joining from Lointek and with two international athletes also joining – Aude Biannic from FDJ Nouvelle-Aquitaine Futuroscope and Małgorzata Jasińska joining the team from US-based squad, Cylance Pro Cycling. In the same week Rachel Neylan (Orica–Scott) was added to the line-up. In November Movistar announced their final tenth rider addition to the 2018 roster, from Lointek, Gloria Rodríguez.

== Team roster ==
As of 17 January 2025.

Rider	Date of birth
Olivia Baril (CAN)	10 October 1997 (age 28)
Aude Biannic (FRA)	27 March 1991 (age 35)
Jelena Erić (SRB)	15 January 1996 (age 30)
Cat Ferguson (GBR)	27 April 2006 (age 20)
Sheyla Gutiérrez (ESP)	1 January 1994 (age 32)
Liane Lippert (GER)	13 January 1998 (age 28)
Carys Lloyd (GBR)	27 April 2006 (age 20)
Floortje Mackaij (NED)	18 October 1995 (age 30)
Ana Vitória Magalhães (BRA)	24 October 2000 (age 25)

Rider	Date of birth
Sara Martín (ESP)	22 March 1999 (age 27)
Mareille Meijering (NED)	11 March 1995 (age 31)
Paula Ostiz (Note: From 1 August 2025.) (ESP)	12 January 2007 (age 19)
Paula Patiño (COL)	29 March 1997 (age 29)
Marlen Reusser (SUI)	20 September 1991 (age 34)
Laura Ruiz Pérez (ESP)	18 June 2004 (age 22)
Lucía Ruiz Pérez (ESP)	18 June 2004 (age 22)
Arlenis Sierra (CUB)	7 December 1992 (age 33)
Claire Steels (GBR)	9 November 1986 (age 39)

== Major results ==
2018
Valencian rider classification Semana Ciclista Valenciana, Alba Teruel
Trofeo Roldan, Gloria Rodríguez
Vuelta a Murcia, Gloria Rodríguez
Balmaseda, Eider Merino
Gran Premio Muniadona, Lourdes Oyarbide
2019
Mountains classification Tour de Yorkshire Women's Race, Mavi Garcia
Stage 4 Vuelta a Burgos Feminas, Lourdes Oyarbide
Team classification Emakumeen Euskal Bira
2020
La Périgord Ladies, Sheyla Gutiérrez
2021
Young rider classification Healthy Ageing Tour, Emma Norsgaard Jørgensen
Dwars door Vlaanderen, Annemiek van Vleuten
Tour of Flanders, Annemiek van Vleuten
Overall Ceratizit Festival Elsy Jacobs, Emma Norsgaard Jørgensen

Stages 1 & 2, Emma Norsgaard Jørgensen

Overall Setmana Ciclista Valenciana, Annemiek van Vleuten

Stage 1, Annemiek van Vleuten

Emakumeen Nafarroako Klasikoa, Annemiek van Vleuten
Stage 1 Thüringen Rundfahrt der Frauen, Emma Norsgaard Jørgensen
Stage 6 Giro Rosa, Emma Norsgaard Jørgensen
Olympic Time Trial, Annemiek van Vleuten
San Sebastián, Annemiek van Vleuten
Overall Ladies Tour of Norway, Annemiek van Vleuten

Stage 3, Annemiek van Vleuten

Overall Challenge by La Vuelta, Annemiek van Vleuten

Stages 2 (ITT) & 3, Annemiek van Vleuten

Overall Tour Cycliste Féminin International de l'Ardèche, Leah Thomas

Stage 2, Leah Thomas

2022
Overall Setmana Ciclista Valenciana, Annemiek van Vleuten

Stage 3, Annemiek van Vleuten

Omloop Het Nieuwsblad, Annemiek van Vleuten
Le Samyn, Emma Norsgaard Jørgensen
Liège–Bastogne–Liège, Annemiek van Vleuten
Stages 1 & 2 Vuelta Ciclista Andalucia Ruta Del Sol, Arlenis Sierra
Emakumeen Nafarroako Women's Elite Classics, Sarah Gigante
Overall Giro Donne, Annemiek van Vleuten

Stages 4 & 8, Annemiek van Vleuten

Overall Tour de France Femmes, Annemiek van Vleuten

Stages 7 & 8, Annemiek van Vleuten

Overall Challenge by La Vuelta, Annemiek van Vleuten

Stage 2, Annemiek van Vleuten

2023
Vuelta a la Comunitat Valenciana Feminas, Floortje Mackaij
Overall La Vuelta Femenina, Annemiek van Vleuten
Overall Vuelta a Andalucia Ruta Del Sol, Katrine Aalerud

Stage 4, Sara Martín

Overall Giro Donne, Annemiek van Vleuten

Stages 1, 6 & 7, Annemiek van Vleuten

Stage 5 Baloise Ladies Tour, Jelena Eric
Stage 2 Tour de France Femmes, Liane Lippert
Stage 6 Tour de France Femmes, Emma Norsgaard Jørgensen
Wilrijk Dernycriterium, Annemiek van Vleuten
Nover Wielerspektakel, Team
Overall Tour of Scandinavia, Annemiek van Vleuten
Stage 3 Tour de Romandie, Liane Lippert
Tre Valli Varesine Women, Liane Lippert
2024
Women Cycling Pro Costa De Almería, Olivia Baril

== National, continental and world champions ==
2018
France Road Race, Aude Biannic
Poland Time Trial, Małgorzata Jasińska
Spain Time Trial, Margarita Victoria Garcia
Spain Under-23 Time Trial, Alba Teruel
Poland Road Race, Małgorzata Jasińska
Spain Road Race, Eider Merino
2019
Spain Time Trial, Sheyla Gutiérrez
2020
Norway Time Trial, Katrine Aalerud
2021
Olympic Time Trial, Annemiek van Vleuten
Denmark Time Trial, Emma Norsgaard
Norway Time Trial, Katrine Aalerud
Serbia Road Race, Jelena Erić
2022
World Road Race, Annemiek van Vleuten
Panamerican Road Race, Arlenis Sierra
Denmark Time Trial, Emma Norsgaard
Serbia Road Race, Jelena Erić
2023
Denmark Time Trial, Emma Norsgaard
Serbia Time Trial, Jelena Erić
Germany Road Race, Liane Lippert
Serbia Road Race, Jelena Erić
Cuba Time Trial, Arlenis Sierra
Cuba Road Race, Arlenis Sierra
2024
Colombia Road Race, Paula Patiño
