= 2022 UCI Road World Championships – Women's road race =

Cycling race

Women's road race
2022 UCI Road World Championships
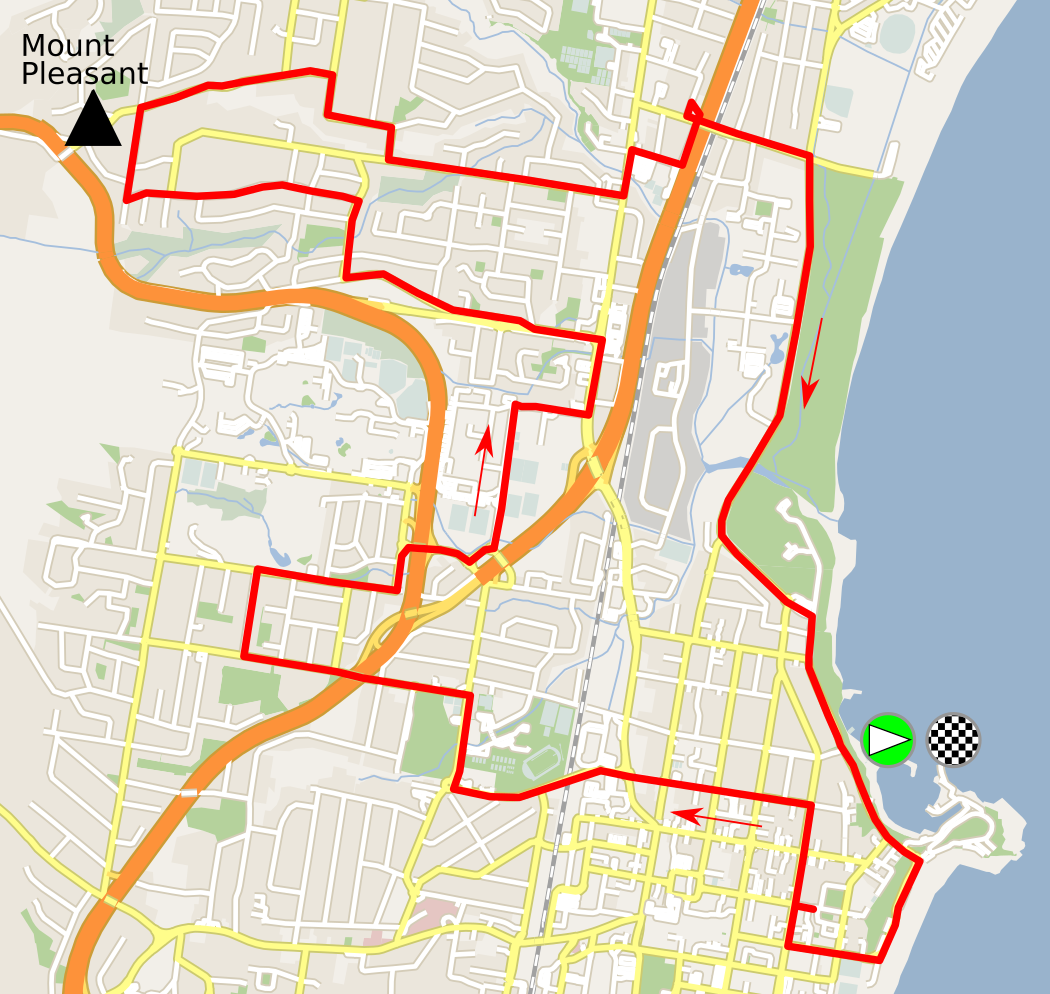

Race details
- Dates: 24 September 2022
- Stages: 1 in Wollongong, Australia
- Distance: 164.3 km (102.1 mi)
- Winning time: 4h 24' 25"

Medalists
| | Gold | Annemiek van Vleuten (NED) |
| | Silver | Lotte Kopecky (BEL) |
| | Bronze | Silvia Persico (ITA) |

The women's road race of the 2022 UCI Road World Championships was a cycling event that took place on 24 September 2022 in Wollongong, Australia. The race was won by Dutch rider Annemiek van Vleuten for the second time.

== Qualification ==
Qualification was based mainly on the UCI World Ranking by nations as of 16 August 2022.

=== UCI World Rankings ===
The following nations qualified.

| Criterium | Rank | Number of riders | | Nations |
| Criterium | Rank | To enter | To start | Nations |
|---|---|---|---|---|
| UCI World Ranking by Nations | 1–5 | 11 | 7 | Netherlands; Italy; France; United States; Belgium |
| UCI World Ranking by Nations | 6–15 | 9 | 6 | Switzerland; Poland; Denmark; Germany; Australia; United Kingdom; Spain; South Africa; New Zealand; Cuba |
| UCI World Ranking by Nations | 16–20 | 8 | 5 | Canada; Colombia; Sweden; Norway; Hungary |
| UCI World Ranking by Individuals (if not already qualified) | 1–200 | 3 | 3 | —N/a |

=== Continental champions ===
| Name | Country | Reason |
|---|---|---|
| Elisa Balsamo | Italy | Incumbent World Champion |
| Ebtissam Mohamed | Egypt | African Champion |
| Arlenis Sierra | Cuba | Panamerican Champion |
| Nguyễn Thị Thật | Vietnam | Asian Champion |
| Lorena Wiebes | Netherlands | European Champion |
| Josie Talbot | Australia | Oceanian Champion |

== Course ==
The race started in Helensburgh (about 30 km (19 mi) north of Wollongong) before tackling a 34 km (21 mi) loop around Mount Keira (climb length of 8.7 km (5.4 mi) with an average gradient of 5% and a maximum incline of 15%). The race then tackled 6 laps of the Wollongong City Circuit. This 17.7 km (11.0 mi) finishing circuit had 220 m (720 ft) of climbing elevation each lap including the Mount Pleasant climb (climb length of 1.1 km (0.68 mi) with an average gradient of 7.7%, maximum incline of 14%).

In total, the Elite Women Road Race climbed 2,433 m (7,982 ft) elevation over a race distance of 164.3 km (102.1 mi) (1 Mount Keira loop, 6x Wollongong City Circuit).

== Final classification ==
Of the race's 126 entrants, 78 riders completed the full distance of 164.3 kilometres (102.1 mi).

| Rank | Rider | Country | Time |
|---|---|---|---|
| 1 | Annemiek van Vleuten | Netherlands | 4h 24' 25" |
| 2 | Lotte Kopecky | Belgium | + 1" |
| 3 | Silvia Persico | Italy | + 1" |
| 4 | Liane Lippert | Germany | + 1" |
| 5 | Cecilie Uttrup Ludwig | Denmark | + 1" |
| 6 | Arlenis Sierra | Cuba | + 1" |
| 7 | Juliette Labous | France | + 1" |
| 8 | Katarzyna Niewiadoma | Poland | + 1" |
| 9 | Elise Chabbey | Switzerland | + 1" |
| 10 | Elisa Longo Borghini | Italy | + 1" |
| 11 | Ashleigh Moolman Pasio | South Africa | + 1" |
| 12 | Niamh Fisher-Black | New Zealand | + 1" |
| 13 | Marlen Reusser | Switzerland | +11" |
| 14 | Marianne Vos | Netherlands | + 13" |
| 15 | Alexandra Manly | Australia | + 13" |
| 16 | Pfeiffer Georgi | United Kingdom | + 13" |
| 17 | Sofia Bertizzolo | Italy | + 13" |
| 18 | Alison Jackson | Canada | + 13" |
| 19 | Justine Ghekiere | Belgium | + 13" |
| 20 | Ricarda Bauernfeind | Germany | + 13" |
| 21 | Brodie Chapman | Australia | + 13" |
| 22 | Simone Boilard | Canada | + 13" |
| 23 | Veronica Ewers | United States | + 13" |
| 24 | Ellen van Dijk | Netherlands | + 13" |
| 25 | Margarita Victoria García | Spain | + 13" |
| 26 | Anna Shackley | United Kingdom | + 13" |
| 27 | Amanda Spratt | Australia | + 1'25" |
| 28 | Paula Patiño | Colombia | + 4'50" |
| 29 | Eri Yonamine | Japan | + 4'50" |
| 30 | Ane Santesteban | Spain | + 4'50" |
| 31 | Silvia Zanardi | Italy | + 4'57" |
| 32 | Noemi Rüegg | Switzerland | + 4'57" |
| 33 | Carina Schrempf | Austria | + 4'57" |
| 34 | Julie de Wilde | Belgium | + 4'57" |
| 35 | Grace Brown | Australia | + 4'57" |
| 36 | Floortje Mackaij | Netherlands | + 4'57" |
| 37 | Olivia Baril | Canada | + 4'57" |
| 38 | Leah Thomas | United States | + 4'57" |
| 39 | Mari Hole Mohr | Norway | + 4'57" |
| 40 | Ella Wyllie | New Zealand | + 4'57" |
| 41 | Évita Muzic | France | + 4'57" |
| 42 | Urška Pintar | Slovenia | + 4'57" |
| 43 | Julie van de Velde | Belgium | + 5'01" |
| 44 | Olga Zabelinskaya | Uzbekistan | + 7'37" |
| 45 | Dominika Wlodarczyk | Poland | + 7'37" |
| 46 | Leah Kirchmann | Canada | + 7'37" |
| 47 | Riejanne Markus | Netherlands | + 7'39" |
| 48 | Elena Cecchini | Italy | + 7'39" |
| 49 | Elisa Balsamo | Italy | + 7'39" |
| 50 | Anna Henderson | United Kingdom | + 7'39" |
| 51 | Shirin van Anrooij | Netherlands | + 7'39" |
| 52 | Jelena Erić | Serbia | + 7'39" |
| 53 | Marie Le Net | France | + 7'39" |
| 54 | Omer Shapira | Israel | + 9'30" |
| 55 | Anne Dorthe Ysland | Norway | + 9'32" |
| 56 | Eugenia Bujak | Slovenia | + 9'32" |
| 57 | Romy Kasper | Germany | + 9'32" |
| 58 | Sarah Roy | Australia | + 9'54" |
| 59 | Rasa Leleivytė | Lithuania | + 9'58" |
| 60 | Marta Jaskulska | Poland | + 12'07" |
| 61 | Kristen Faulkner | United States | + 12'07" |
| 62 | Julia Borgström | Sweden | + 12'07" |
| 63 | Elena Hartmann | Switzerland | + 12'23" |
| 64 | Agnieszka Skalniak | Poland | + 12'42" |
| 65 | Špela Kern | Slovenia | + 12'42" |
| 66 | Lina Hernández | Colombia | + 12'42" |
| 67 | Ingvild Gaskjenn | Norway | + 12'42" |
| 68 | Coralie Demay | France | + 12'42" |
| 69 | Diana Peñuela | Colombia | + 12'42" |
| 70 | Elizabeth Holden | United Kingdom | + 12'42" |
| 71 | Marta Bastianelli | Italy | + 12'42" |
| 72 | Franziska Koch | Germany | + 15'51" |
| 73 | Nina Berton | Luxembourg | + 15'51" |
| 74 | Hayley Preen | South Africa | + 15'51" |
| 75 | Heidi Franz | United States | + 15'51" |
| 76 | Nathalie Eklund | Sweden | + 15'51" |
| 77 | Julie Leth | Denmark | + 15'51" |
| 78 | Kateřina Nash | Czech Republic | + 15'51" |

| Rank | Rider | Country | Time |
|---|---|---|---|
| | Jade Wiel | France | DNF |
| | Vittoria Guazzini | Italy | DNF |
| | Elynor Bäckstedt | United Kingdom | DNF |
| | Skylar Schneider | United States | DNF |
| | Gladys Verhulst | France | DNF |
| | Sara Martín | Spain | DNF |
| | Lourdes Oyarbide | Spain | DNF |
| | Aude Biannic | France | DNF |
| | Alice Towers | United Kingdom | DNF |
| | Josie Talbot | Australia | DNF |
| | Nicole Koller | Switzerland | DNF |
| | Yanina Kuskova | Uzbekistan | DNF |
| | Lea Lin Teutenberg | Germany | DNF |
| | Caroline Andersson | Sweden | DNF |
| | Emma Cecilie Bjerg | Denmark | DNF |
| | Katrine Aalerud | Norway | DNF |
| | Emma Langley | United States | DNF |
| | Mikayla Harvey | New Zealand | DNF |
| | Karolina Kumięga | Poland | DNF |
| | Nora Jenčušová | Slovakia | DNF |
| | Maryna Vernyk | Ukraine | DNF |
| | Jesse Vandenbulcke | Belgium | DNF |
| | Georgia Baker | Australia | DNF |
| | Leung Wing-yee | Hong Kong | DNF |
| | Hanna Nilsson | Sweden | DNF |
| | Maude Elaine Le Roux | South Africa | DNF |
| | Marta Lach | Poland | DNF |
| | Phetdarin Somrat | Thailand | DNF |
| | Tereza Neumanová | Czech Republic | DNF |
| | Magdeleine Vallieres | Canada | DNF |
| | Sandra Alonso | Spain | DNF |
| | Natalia Franco | Colombia | DNF |
| | Idoia Eraso | Spain | DNF |
| | Courteney Webb | South Africa | DNF |
| | Henrietta Christie | New Zealand | DNF |
| | Valentine Nzayisenga | Rwanda | DNF |
| | Mieke Kröger | Germany | DNF |
| | Daryna Nahuliak | Ukraine | DNF |
| | Rebecca Koerner | Denmark | DNF |
| | Luciana Roland | Argentina | DNF |
| | Marte Berg Edseth | Norway | DNF |
| | Lauren Stephens | United States | DNF |
| | Valerie Demey | Belgium | DNF |
| | Ana Vitória Magalhães | Brazil | DNF |
| | Nesrine Houili | Algeria | DNF |
| | Danait Tekeste | Eritrea | DNF |
| | Chaniporn Batriya | Thailand | DNF |
| | Safia Al Sayegh | United Arab Emirates | DNF |
| | Christina Schweinberger | Austria | DNS |
| | Kathrin Schweinberger | Austria | DNS |
| | Demi Vollering | Netherlands | DNS |
