= 2020 Giro Rosa =

Cycling race

2020 UCI Women's World Tour, race 5 of 11
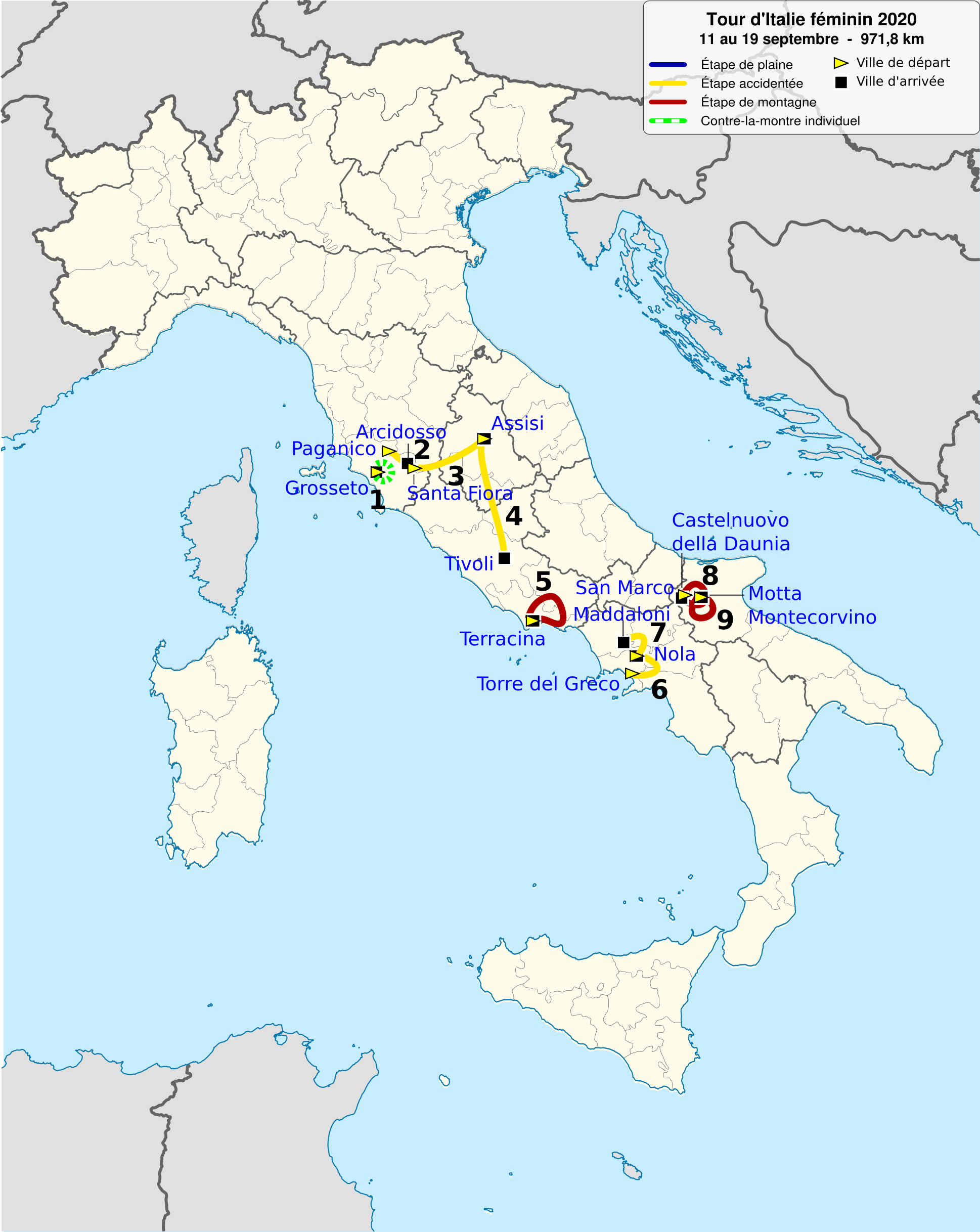
- Giro Rosa 2020 route

Race details
- Dates: 11 – 19 September 2020
- Stages: 9
- Distance: 975.8 km (606.3 mi)
- Winning time: 26h 25' 43"

Results
Jersey awarded to the overall winner	Winner	Anna van der Breggen (NED)	(Boels–Dolmans)
	Second	Katarzyna Niewiadoma (POL)	(Canyon//SRAM)
	Third	Elisa Longo Borghini (ITA)	(Trek–Segafredo)
Jersey awarded to the points classification winner	Points	Marianne Vos (NED)	(CCC - Liv)
Jersey awarded to the mountains classification winner	Mountains	Cecilie Uttrup Ludwig (DEN)	(FDJ Nouvelle-Aquitaine Futuroscope)
Jersey awarded to the young rider classification winner	Young rider	Mikayla Harvey (NZL)	(Équipe Paule Ka)
Jersey awarded to the team classification winner	Team	CCC - Liv	

The 31st women's Giro d'Italia, or Giro Rosa, was held from 11 to 19 September 2020. It is considered the most prestigious stage race of the women's calendar and of the 2020 UCI Women's World Tour. The race was originally scheduled from 26 June to 5 July, but was postponed to mid-September due to the COVID-19 pandemic in Italy and reduced to 9 stages rather than the originally planned 10.

The race was won by Anna van der Breggen for the third time.

== Route ==
The race consisted of 9 stages totalling 975.8 km (606.3 mi), which began in Grosseto on 11 September with a team time trial and finished in Motta Montecorvino on 19 September.

Stage characteristics and winners
Stage	Date	Course	Distance	Type	Winner
1	11 September	Grosseto to Grosseto	16.8 km (10.4 mi)	Team time trial	Trek–Segafredo
2	12 September	Civitella Paganico to Arcidosso	124.8 km (77.5 mi)	Hilly stage	Annemiek van Vleuten (NED)
3	13 September	Santa Fiora to Assisi	142.2 km (88.4 mi)	Hilly stage	Marianne Vos (NED)
4	14 September	Assisi to Tivoli	170.3 km (105.8 mi)	Hilly stage	Lizzy Banks (GBR)
5	15 September	Terracina to Terracina	110.3 km (68.5 mi)	Hilly stage	Marianne Vos (NED)
6	16 September	Torre del Greco to Nola	97.5 km (60.6 mi)	Flat stage	Marianne Vos (NED)
7	17 September	Nola to Maddaloni	109 km (68 mi)	Hilly stage	Lotte Kopecky (BEL)
8	18 September	Castelnuovo della Daunia to San Marco la Catola	91.5 km (56.9 mi)	Mountain stage	Elisa Longo Borghini (ITA)
9	19 September	Motta Montecorvino to Motta Montecorvino	109.9 km (68.3 mi)	Mountain stage	Évita Muzic (FRA)
Total		975.8 km (606.3 mi)			

== Teams ==
All eight UCI Women's WorldTeams, as well as fifteen UCI Women's Continental Teams, participated in the race. Each of the twenty-three teams entered six riders, for a total of 138 riders. Of 85 of these riders finished the race.

UCI Women's WorldTeams

- Alé BTC Ljubljana
- Canyon//SRAM
- CCC - Liv
- FDJ Nouvelle-Aquitaine Futuroscope
- Mitchelton–Scott
- Movistar Team
- Team Sunweb
- Trek–Segafredo

UCI Women's Continental Teams

- Aromitalia–Basso Bikes–Vaiano
- Astana
- Bepink
- Bizkaia–Durango
- Boels–Dolmans
- Ceratizit–WNT Pro Cycling
- Cogeas–Mettler–Look
- Cronos–Casa Dorada
- Équipe Paule Ka
- Eurotarget–Bianchi–Vittoria
- Lotto–Soudal Ladies
- Lviv Cycling Team
- Servetto–Piumate–Beltrami TSA
- Top Girls Fassa Bortolo
- Valcar–Travel & Service

== Stages ==
=== Stage 1 ===
11 September 2020 — Grosseto to Grosseto, 16.8 km (10.4 mi), team time trial (TTT)

Stage 1 Result
Rank	Team	Time
1	Trek–Segafredo	20' 05"
2	Boels–Dolmans	+ 3"
3	Mitchelton–Scott	+ 5"
4	Équipe Paule Ka	+ 10"
5	Team Sunweb	+ 14"
6	Canyon//SRAM	+ 16"
7	CCC - Liv	+ 42"
8	Ceratizit–WNT Pro Cycling	+ 43"
9	Alé BTC Ljubljana	+ 49"
10	Valcar–Travel & Service	+ 51"

General classification after Stage 1
Rank	Rider	Team	Time
1	Elisa Longo Borghini (ITA)	Trek–Segafredo	20' 05"
2	Ruth Winder (USA)	Trek–Segafredo	+ 0"
3	Ellen van Dijk (NED)	Trek–Segafredo	+ 0"
4	Lizzie Deignan (GBR)	Trek–Segafredo	+ 0"
5	Chantal Blaak (NED)	Boels–Dolmans	+ 3"
6	Amy Pieters (NED)	Boels–Dolmans	+ 3"
7	Jolien D'Hoore (BEL)	Boels–Dolmans	+ 3"
8	Anna van der Breggen (NED)	Boels–Dolmans	+ 3"
9	Karol-Ann Canuel (CAN)	Boels–Dolmans	+ 3"
10	Eva Buurman (NED)	Boels–Dolmans	+ 3"

=== Stage 2 ===
12 September 2020 — Civitella Paganico to Arcidosso, 124.8 km (77.5 mi)

Stage 2 Result
Rank	Rider	Team	Time
1	Annemiek van Vleuten (NED)	Mitchelton–Scott	3h 53' 20"
2	Anna van der Breggen (NED)	Boels–Dolmans	+ 1' 16"
3	Katarzyna Niewiadoma (POL)	Canyon//SRAM	+ 1' 16"
4	Cecilie Uttrup Ludwig (DEN)	FDJ Nouvelle-Aquitaine Futuroscope	+ 1' 29"
5	Ashleigh Moolman (RSA)	CCC - Liv	+ 3' 07"
6	Mavi García (ESP)	Alé BTC Ljubljana	+ 3' 07"
7	Mikayla Harvey (NZL)	Équipe Paule Ka	+ 3' 11"
8	Soraya Paladin (ITA)	CCC - Liv	+ 3' 52"
9	Erica Magnaldi (ITA)	Ceratizit–WNT Pro Cycling	+ 3' 55"
10	Amanda Spratt (AUS)	Mitchelton–Scott	+ 3' 57"

General classification after Stage 2
Rank	Rider	Team	Time
1	Annemiek van Vleuten (NED)	Mitchelton–Scott	4h 13' 20"
2	Anna van der Breggen (NED)	Boels–Dolmans	+ 1' 18"
3	Katarzyna Niewiadoma (POL)	Canyon//SRAM	+ 1' 33"
4	Cecilie Uttrup Ludwig (DEN)	FDJ Nouvelle-Aquitaine Futuroscope	+ 2' 54"
5	Mikayla Harvey (NZL)	Équipe Paule Ka	+ 3' 26"
6	Ashleigh Moolman (RSA)	CCC - Liv	+ 3' 54"
7	Mavi García (ESP)	Alé BTC Ljubljana	+ 4' 01"
8	Amanda Spratt (AUS)	Mitchelton–Scott	+ 4' 07"
9	Elise Chabbey (SUI)	Équipe Paule Ka	+ 4' 15"
10	Elisa Longo Borghini (ITA)	Trek–Segafredo	+ 4' 27"

=== Stage 3 ===
13 September 2020 — Santa Fiora to Assisi, 142.2 km (88.4 mi)

Stage 3 Result
Rank	Rider	Team	Time
1	Marianne Vos (NED)	CCC - Liv	3h 53' 34"
2	Cecilie Uttrup Ludwig (DEN)	FDJ Nouvelle-Aquitaine Futuroscope	+ 2"
3	Elisa Longo Borghini (ITA)	Trek–Segafredo	+ 5"
4	Liane Lippert (GER)	Team Sunweb	+ 8"
5	Annemiek van Vleuten (NED)	Mitchelton–Scott	+ 12"
6	Lotte Kopecky (BEL)	Lotto–Soudal Ladies	+ 13"
7	Anna van der Breggen (NED)	Boels–Dolmans	+ 16"
8	Ashleigh Moolman (RSA)	CCC - Liv	+ 16"
9	Katarzyna Niewiadoma (POL)	Canyon//SRAM	+ 16"
10	Mavi García (ESP)	Alé BTC Ljubljana	+ 19"

General classification after Stage 3
Rank	Rider	Team	Time
1	Annemiek van Vleuten (NED)	Mitchelton–Scott	8h 07' 06"
2	Anna van der Breggen (NED)	Boels–Dolmans	+ 1' 22"
3	Katarzyna Niewiadoma (POL)	Canyon//SRAM	+ 1' 37"
4	Cecilie Uttrup Ludwig (DEN)	FDJ Nouvelle-Aquitaine Futuroscope	+ 2' 38"
5	Mikayla Harvey (NZL)	Équipe Paule Ka	+ 3' 40"
6	Ashleigh Moolman (RSA)	CCC - Liv	+ 3' 58"
7	Mavi García (ESP)	Alé BTC Ljubljana	+ 4' 08"
8	Elisa Longo Borghini (ITA)	Trek–Segafredo	+ 4' 16"
9	Elise Chabbey (SUI)	Équipe Paule Ka	+ 4' 40"
10	Marianne Vos (NED)	CCC - Liv	+ 4' 53"

=== Stage 4 ===
14 September 2020 — Assisi to Tivoli, 170.3 km (105.8 mi)

Stage 4 Result
Rank	Rider	Team	Time
1	Lizzy Banks (GBR)	Équipe Paule Ka	4h 27' 21"
2	Eugenia Bujak (SLO)	Alé BTC Ljubljana	+ 7"
3	Annemiek van Vleuten (NED)	Mitchelton–Scott	+ 1' 10"
4	Elisa Longo Borghini (ITA)	Trek–Segafredo	+ 1' 22"
5	Katarzyna Niewiadoma (POL)	Canyon//SRAM	+ 1' 25"
6	Liane Lippert (GER)	Team Sunweb	+ 1' 27"
7	Cecilie Uttrup Ludwig (DEN)	FDJ Nouvelle-Aquitaine Futuroscope	+ 1' 31"
8	Mavi García (ESP)	Alé BTC Ljubljana	+ 1' 36"
9	Ashleigh Moolman (RSA)	CCC - Liv	+ 1' 42"
10	Marianne Vos (NED)	CCC - Liv	+ 1' 42"

General classification after Stage 4
Rank	Rider	Team	Time
1	Annemiek van Vleuten (NED)	Mitchelton–Scott	12h 35' 33"
2	Katarzyna Niewiadoma (POL)	Canyon//SRAM	+ 1' 56"
3	Anna van der Breggen (NED)	Boels–Dolmans	+ 2' 03"
4	Cecilie Uttrup Ludwig (DEN)	FDJ Nouvelle-Aquitaine Futuroscope	+ 3' 03"
5	Mikayla Harvey (NZL)	Équipe Paule Ka	+ 4' 21"
6	Elisa Longo Borghini (ITA)	Trek–Segafredo	+ 4' 32"
7	Ashleigh Moolman (RSA)	CCC - Liv	+ 4' 34"
8	Mavi García (ESP)	Alé BTC Ljubljana	+ 4' 38"
9	Marianne Vos (NED)	CCC - Liv	+ 5' 29"
10	Elise Chabbey (SUI)	Équipe Paule Ka	+ 5' 36"

=== Stage 5 ===
15 September 2020 — Terracina to Terracina, 110.3 km (68.5 mi)

Stage 5 Result
Rank	Rider	Team	Time
1	Marianne Vos (NED)	CCC - Liv	2h 47' 27"
2	Lotte Kopecky (BEL)	Lotto–Soudal	+ 0"
3	Lizzie Deignan (GBR)	Trek–Segafredo	+ 0"
4	Coryn Rivera (USA)	Team Sunweb	+ 0"
5	Lisa Brennauer (GER)	Ceratizit–WNT Pro Cycling	+ 0"
6	Alison Jackson (CAN)	Team Sunweb	+ 0"
7	Sandra Alonso (ESP)	Cronos–Casa Dorada	+ 0"
8	Amy Pieters (NED)	Boels–Dolmans	+ 0"
9	Jelena Erić (SRB)	Movistar Team	+ 0"
10	Vittoria Guazzini (ITA)	Valcar–Travel & Service	+ 0"

General classification after Stage 5
Rank	Rider	Team	Time
1	Annemiek van Vleuten (NED)	Mitchelton–Scott	15h 23' 00"
2	Katarzyna Niewiadoma (POL)	Canyon//SRAM	+ 1' 56"
3	Anna van der Breggen (NED)	Boels–Dolmans	+ 2' 03"
4	Cecilie Uttrup Ludwig (DEN)	FDJ Nouvelle-Aquitaine Futuroscope	+ 3' 03"
5	Mikayla Harvey (NZL)	Équipe Paule Ka	+ 4' 21"
6	Elisa Longo Borghini (ITA)	Trek–Segafredo	+ 4' 32"
7	Ashleigh Moolman (RSA)	CCC - Liv	+ 4' 34"
8	Mavi García (ESP)	Alé BTC Ljubljana	+ 4' 38"
9	Marianne Vos (NED)	CCC - Liv	+ 5' 19"
10	Elise Chabbey (SUI)	Équipe Paule Ka	+ 5' 36"

=== Stage 6 ===
16 September 2020 — Torre del Greco to Nola, 97.5 km (60.6 mi)

Stage 6 Result
Rank	Rider	Team	Time
1	Marianne Vos (NED)	CCC - Liv	2h 14' 24"
2	Hannah Barnes (GBR)	Canyon//SRAM	+ 0"
3	Lotte Kopecky (BEL)	Lotto–Soudal	+ 0"
4	Coryn Rivera (USA)	Team Sunweb	+ 0"
5	Amy Pieters (NED)	Boels–Dolmans	+ 0"
6	Arlenis Sierra (CUB)	Astana	+ 0"
7	Ilaria Sanguineti (ITA)	Valcar–Travel & Service	+ 0"
8	Giorgia Bariani (ITA)	Top Girls Fassa Bortolo	+ 0"
9	Stine Borgli (NOR)	FDJ Nouvelle-Aquitaine Futuroscope	+ 0"
10	Katarzyna Niewiadoma (POL)	Canyon//SRAM	+ 0"

General classification after Stage 6
Rank	Rider	Team	Time
1	Annemiek van Vleuten (NED)	Mitchelton–Scott	17h 37' 28"
2	Katarzyna Niewiadoma (POL)	Canyon//SRAM	+ 1' 52"
3	Anna van der Breggen (NED)	Boels–Dolmans	+ 2' 03"
4	Cecilie Uttrup Ludwig (DEN)	FDJ Nouvelle-Aquitaine Futuroscope	+ 3' 03"
5	Mikayla Harvey (NZL)	Équipe Paule Ka	+ 4' 21"
6	Elisa Longo Borghini (ITA)	Trek–Segafredo	+ 4' 32"
7	Ashleigh Moolman (RSA)	CCC - Liv	+ 4' 34"
8	Mavi García (ESP)	Alé BTC Ljubljana	+ 4' 38"
9	Marianne Vos (NED)	CCC - Liv	+ 5' 02"
10	Elise Chabbey (SUI)	Équipe Paule Ka	+ 5' 32"

=== Stage 7 ===
17 September 2020 — Nola to Maddaloni, 109 km (68 mi)

Stage 7 Result
Rank	Rider	Team	Time
1	Lotte Kopecky (BEL)	Lotto–Soudal	2h 52' 12"
2	Lizzie Deignan (GBR)	Trek–Segafredo	+ 2"
3	Katarzyna Niewiadoma (POL)	Canyon//SRAM	+ 3"
4	Marta Cavalli (ITA)	Valcar–Travel & Service	+ 3"
5	Anna van der Breggen (NED)	Boels–Dolmans	+ 3"
6	Sabrina Stultiens (NED)	CCC - Liv	+ 3"
7	Ane Santesteban (ESP)	Ceratizit–WNT Pro Cycling	+ 3"
8	Liane Lippert (GER)	Team Sunweb	+ 3"
9	Ashleigh Moolman (RSA)	CCC - Liv	+ 3"
10	Floortje Mackaij (NED)	Team Sunweb	+ 3"

General classification after Stage 7
Rank	Rider	Team	Time
1	Annemiek van Vleuten (NED)	Mitchelton–Scott	20h 29' 43"
2	Katarzyna Niewiadoma (POL)	Canyon//SRAM	+ 1' 48"
3	Anna van der Breggen (NED)	Boels–Dolmans	+ 2' 03"
4	Cecilie Uttrup Ludwig (DEN)	FDJ Nouvelle-Aquitaine Futuroscope	+ 3' 03"
5	Mikayla Harvey (NZL)	Équipe Paule Ka	+ 4' 21"
6	Elisa Longo Borghini (ITA)	Trek–Segafredo	+ 4' 32"
7	Ashleigh Moolman (RSA)	CCC - Liv	+ 4' 34"
8	Mavi García (ESP)	Alé BTC Ljubljana	+ 4' 38"
9	Marianne Vos (NED)	CCC - Liv	+ 5' 02"
10	Lizzy Banks (GBR)	Équipe Paule Ka	+ 5' 56"

=== Stage 8 ===
18 September 2020 — Castelnuovo della Daunia to San Marco la Catola, 91.5 km (56.9 mi)

Race leader Annemiek van Vleuten and points classification leader Marianne Vos were among those involved in a crash with under three kilometers to go on stage 7. As a result of injuries sustained in that crash, van Vleuten, along with teammate Amanda Spratt, were forced to abandon the race, while Vos escaped with only abrasions. Due to van Vleuten's withdrawal, second placed Katarzyna Niewiadoma wore the pink jersey on stage 8. Van Vleuten subsequently started the World Championships after surgery on her wrist. Amanda Spratt withdrew from the World Championships.

Stage 8 Result
Rank	Rider	Team	Time
1	Elisa Longo Borghini (ITA)	Trek–Segafredo	2h 33' 57"
2	Anna van der Breggen (NED)	Boels–Dolmans	+ 0"
3	Mikayla Harvey (NZL)	Équipe Paule Ka	+ 31"
4	Katrine Aalerud (NOR)	Movistar Team	+ 1' 06"
5	Cecilie Uttrup Ludwig (DEN)	FDJ Nouvelle-Aquitaine Futuroscope	+ 1' 19"
6	Katarzyna Niewiadoma (POL)	Canyon//SRAM	+ 1' 19"
7	Pauliena Rooijakkers (NED)	CCC - Liv	+ 1' 19"
8	Liane Lippert (GER)	Team Sunweb	+ 1' 31"
9	Marta Cavalli (ITA)	Valcar–Travel & Service	+ 1' 52"
10	Sofia Bertizzolo (ITA)	CCC - Liv	+ 1' 58"

General classification after Stage 8
Rank	Rider	Team	Time
1	Anna van der Breggen (NED)	Boels–Dolmans	23h 05' 37"
2	Katarzyna Niewiadoma (POL)	Canyon//SRAM	+ 1' 10"
3	Elisa Longo Borghini (ITA)	Trek–Segafredo	+ 2' 23"
4	Cecilie Uttrup Ludwig (DEN)	FDJ Nouvelle-Aquitaine Futuroscope	+ 2' 25"
5	Mikayla Harvey (NZL)	Équipe Paule Ka	+ 2' 51"
6	Ashleigh Moolman (RSA)	CCC - Liv	+ 4' 48"
7	Mavi García (ESP)	Alé BTC Ljubljana	+ 5' 58"
8	Ane Santesteban (ESP)	Ceratizit–WNT Pro Cycling	+ 6' 17"
9	Marianne Vos (NED)	CCC - Liv	+ 7' 29"
10	Lizzy Banks (GBR)	Équipe Paule Ka	+ 7' 49"

=== Stage 9 ===
19 September 2020 — Motta Montecorvino to Motta Montecorvino, 109.9 km (68.3 mi)

Stage 9 Result
Rank	Rider	Team	Time
1	Évita Muzic (FRA)	FDJ Nouvelle-Aquitaine Futuroscope	3h 16' 30"
2	Niamh Fisher-Black (NZL)	Équipe Paule Ka	+ 0"
3	Juliette Labous (FRA)	Team Sunweb	+ 0"
4	Katia Ragusa (ITA)	Astana	+ 3"
5	Ellen van Dijk (NED)	Trek–Segafredo	+ 4"
6	Erica Magnaldi (ITA)	Ceratizit–WNT Pro Cycling	+ 8"
7	Sabrina Stultiens (NED)	CCC - Liv	+ 10"
8	Eugenia Bujak (SLO)	Alé BTC Ljubljana	+ 25"
9	Arlenis Sierra (CUB)	Astana	+ 36"
10	Paula Patiño (COL)	Movistar Team	+ 42"

General classification after Stage 9
Rank	Rider	Team	Time
1	Anna van der Breggen (NED)	Boels–Dolmans	26h 25' 43"
2	Katarzyna Niewiadoma (POL)	Canyon//SRAM	+ 1' 14"
3	Elisa Longo Borghini (ITA)	Trek–Segafredo	+ 2' 20"
4	Cecilie Uttrup Ludwig (DEN)	FDJ Nouvelle-Aquitaine Futuroscope	+ 2' 22"
5	Mikayla Harvey (NZL)	Équipe Paule Ka	+ 2' 52"
6	Ashleigh Moolman (RSA)	CCC - Liv	+ 5' 02"
7	Ane Santesteban (ESP)	Ceratizit–WNT Pro Cycling	+ 6' 31"
8	Paula Patiño (COL)	Movistar Team	+ 6' 54"
9	Mavi García (ESP)	Alé BTC Ljubljana	+ 7' 06"
10	Évita Muzic (FRA)	FDJ Nouvelle-Aquitaine Futuroscope	+ 7' 47"

== Classification leadership table ==
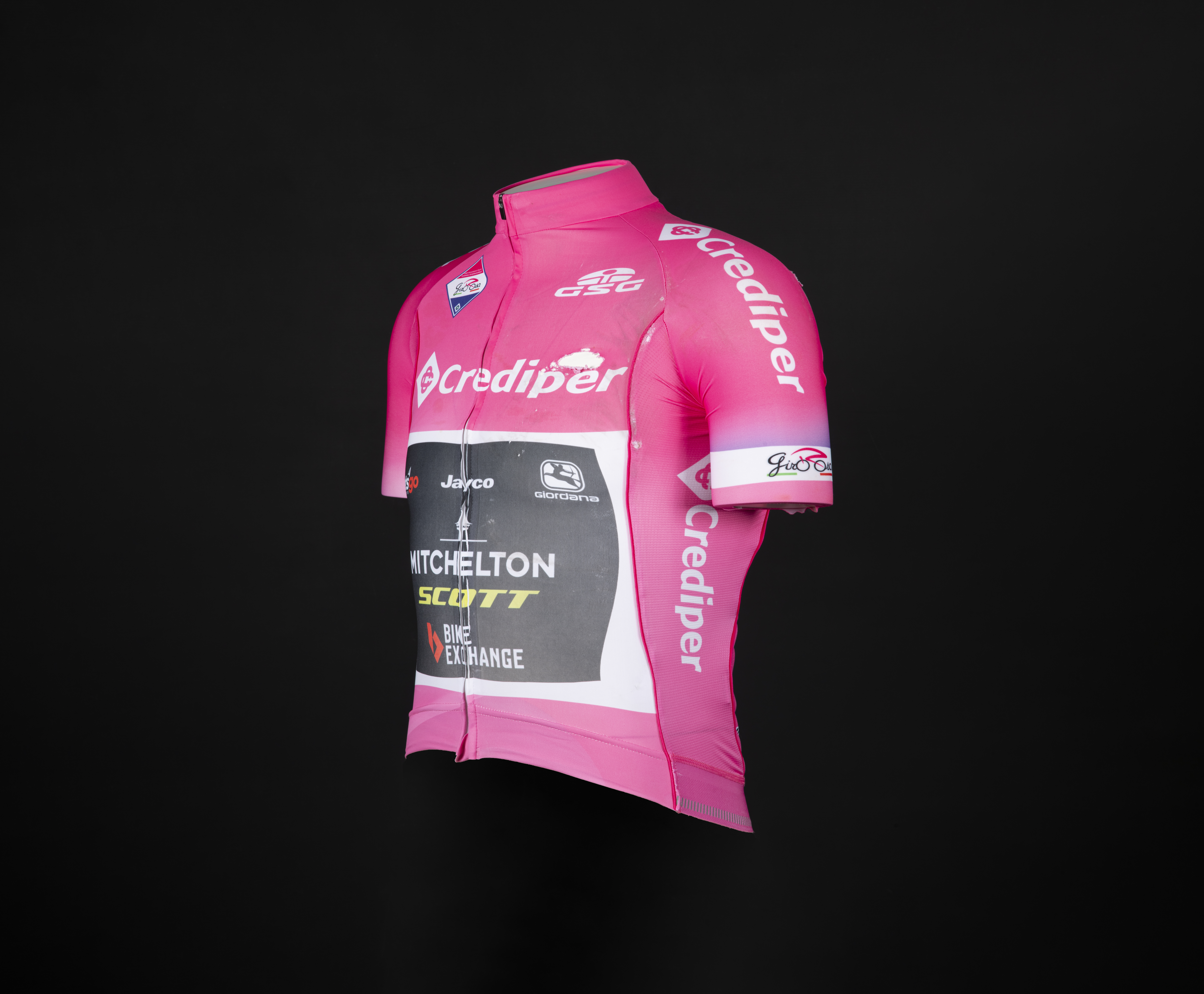
The GC leader's jersey worn by Annemiek van Vleuten (Mitchelton–Scott). (collection KOERS. Museum of Cycle Racing)

In the 2020 Giro d'Italia Femminile, five different jerseys were awarded.

The most important was the general classification (GC), which was calculated by adding each cyclist's finishing times on each stage. Time bonuses were awarded to the first three finishers on all stages with the exception of the time trials: the stage winner won a ten-second bonus, with six and four seconds for the second and third riders respectively. Bonus seconds were also awarded to the first three riders at intermediate sprints; three seconds for the winner of the sprint, two seconds for the rider in second and one second for the rider in third. The rider with the least accumulated time was the race leader, identified by a pink jersey. This classification was considered the most important of the 2020 Giro d'Italia Femminile, and the winner of the classification was considered the winner of the race.

Additionally, there was a points classification, which awarded a cyclamen jersey. In the points classification, cyclists received points for finishing in the top 10 in a stage, and unlike in the points classification in the Tour de France, the winners of all stages – with the exception of the team time trial, which awards no points towards the classification – were awarded the same number of points. For winning a stage, a rider earned 15 points, with 12 for second, 10 for third, 8 for fourth, 6 for fifth with a point fewer per place down to a single point for 10th place.

Points for the mountains classification
Position	1	2	3	4	5
Points for Category 2	7	5	3	2	1
Points for Category 3	5	4	3	2	1

There was also a mountains classification, the leadership of which was marked by a green jersey. In the mountains classification, points towards the classification were won by reaching the top of a climb before other cyclists. Each climb was categorised as either second, or third-category, with more points available for the higher-categorised climbs; however on both categories, the top five riders were awarded points. The fourth jersey represents the young rider classification, marked by a white jersey. This was decided in the same way as the general classification, but only riders born on or after 1 January 1997 were eligible to be ranked in the classification.

The fifth and final jersey represented the classification for Italian riders, marked by a blue jersey. This was decided in the same way as the general classification, but only riders born in Italy were eligible to be ranked in the classification. There was also a team classification, in which the times of the best three cyclists per team on each stage were added together; the leading team at the end of the race was the team with the lowest total time. The daily team leaders wore red dossards in the following stage.

Classification leadership by stage
Stage	Winner	General classification	Points classification	Mountains classification	Young rider classification	Italian rider classification	Teams classification
1	Trek–Segafredo	Elisa Longo Borghini	not awarded	not awarded	Emma Cecilie Norsgaard	Elisa Longo Borghini	Trek–Segafredo
2	Annemiek van Vleuten	Annemiek van Vleuten	Annemiek van Vleuten	Annemiek van Vleuten	Mikayla Harvey	Elisa Longo Borghini	CCC - Liv
3	Marianne Vos	Annemiek van Vleuten	Annemiek van Vleuten	Marianne Vos	Mikayla Harvey	Elisa Longo Borghini	CCC - Liv
4	Lizzy Banks	Annemiek van Vleuten	Annemiek van Vleuten	Cecilie Uttrup Ludwig	Mikayla Harvey	Elisa Longo Borghini	Équipe Paule Ka
5	Marianne Vos	Annemiek van Vleuten	Marianne Vos	Cecilie Uttrup Ludwig	Mikayla Harvey	Elisa Longo Borghini	Équipe Paule Ka
6	Marianne Vos	Annemiek van Vleuten	Marianne Vos	Cecilie Uttrup Ludwig	Mikayla Harvey	Elisa Longo Borghini	Équipe Paule Ka
7	Lotte Kopecky	Annemiek van Vleuten	Marianne Vos	Cecilie Uttrup Ludwig	Mikayla Harvey	Elisa Longo Borghini	CCC - Liv
8	Elisa Longo Borghini	Anna van der Breggen	Marianne Vos	Cecilie Uttrup Ludwig	Mikayla Harvey	Elisa Longo Borghini	CCC - Liv
9	Évita Muzic	Anna van der Breggen	Marianne Vos	Cecilie Uttrup Ludwig	Mikayla Harvey	Elisa Longo Borghini	CCC - Liv
Final		Anna van der Breggen	Marianne Vos	Cecilie Uttrup Ludwig	Mikayla Harvey	Elisa Longo Borghini	CCC - Liv

- On stage 2, Elena Cecchini, who was second in the Italian rider classification, wore the blue jersey, because first placed Elisa Longo Borghini wore the pink jersey as the leader of the general classification.
- On stage 3, Katarzyna Niewiadoma, who was third in the points classification, wore the violet jersey, because first placed Annemiek van Vleuten wore the pink jersey as the leader of the general classification, and second placed Anna van der Breggen wore the Dutch national jersey as the defending Dutch national road race champion. Because these riders were also the first three in the mountains classification, the green jersey was worn by fourth placed Cecilie Uttrup Ludwig.
- On stage 4, Cecilie Uttrup Ludwig, who was second in the points classification, wore the violet jersey, because first placed Annemiek van Vleuten wore the pink jersey as the leader of the general classification.
- On stage 5, Katarzyna Niewiadoma, who was third in the points classification, wore the violet jersey, because first placed Annemiek van Vleuten wore the pink jersey as the leader of the general classification, and second placed Cecilie Uttrup Ludwig wore the green jersey as the leader of the mountains classification.
- On stage 8, Katarzyna Niewiadoma, who was second in the general classification, wore the pink jersey, because first placed Annemiek van Vleuten abandoned the race after stage 7 due to injuries sustained in a crash.

== Final classification standings ==
Legend
Denotes the winner of the general classification	Denotes the winner of the mountains classification
Denotes the winner of the points classification	Denotes the winner of the young rider classification
Denotes the winner of the Italian rider classification	Denotes the winner of the teams classification

=== General classification ===
Final general classification (1–10)
Rank	Rider	Team	Time
1	Anna van der Breggen (NED)	Boels–Dolmans	26h 25' 43"
2	Katarzyna Niewiadoma (POL)	Canyon//SRAM	+ 1' 14"
3	Elisa Longo Borghini (ITA)	Trek–Segafredo	+ 2' 20"
4	Cecilie Uttrup Ludwig (DEN)	FDJ Nouvelle-Aquitaine Futuroscope	+ 2' 22"
5	Mikayla Harvey (NZL)	Équipe Paule Ka	+ 2' 52"
6	Ashleigh Moolman (RSA)	CCC - Liv	+ 5' 02"
7	Ane Santesteban (ESP)	Ceratizit–WNT Pro Cycling	+ 6' 31"
8	Paula Patiño (COL)	Movistar Team	+ 6' 54"
9	Mavi García (ESP)	Alé BTC Ljubljana	+ 7' 06"
10	Évita Muzic (FRA)	FDJ Nouvelle-Aquitaine Futuroscope	+ 7' 47"

=== Points classification ===
Final points classification (1–10)
Rank	Rider	Team	Points
1	Marianne Vos (NED)	CCC - Liv	46
2	Anna van der Breggen (NED)	Boels–Dolmans	34
3	Katarzyna Niewiadoma (POL)	Canyon//SRAM	34
4	Elisa Longo Borghini (ITA)	Trek–Segafredo	33
5	Cecilie Uttrup Ludwig (DEN)	FDJ Nouvelle-Aquitaine Futuroscope	30
6	Lizzie Deignan (GBR)	Trek–Segafredo	22
7	Liane Lippert (GER)	Team Sunweb	19
8	Coryn Rivera (USA)	Team Sunweb	16
9	Évita Muzic (FRA)	FDJ Nouvelle-Aquitaine Futuroscope	15
10	Lizzy Banks (GBR)	Équipe Paule Ka	15

=== Mountains classification ===
Final mountains classification (1–10)
Rank	Rider	Team	Points
1	Cecilie Uttrup Ludwig (DEN)	FDJ Nouvelle-Aquitaine Futuroscope	40
2	Elisa Longo Borghini (ITA)	Trek–Segafredo	28
3	Katia Ragusa (ITA)	Astana	24
4	Marianne Vos (NED)	CCC - Liv	17
5	Maria Novolodskaya (RUS)	Cogeas–Mettler–Look	12
6	Anna van der Breggen (NED)	Boels–Dolmans	12
7	Liane Lippert (GER)	Team Sunweb	7
8	Évita Muzic (FRA)	FDJ Nouvelle-Aquitaine Futuroscope	5
9	Mikayla Harvey (NZL)	Équipe Paule Ka	5
10	Pauliena Rooijakkers (NED)	CCC - Liv	5

=== Young rider classification ===
Final young rider classification (1–10)
Rank	Rider	Team	Time
1	Mikayla Harvey (NZL)	Équipe Paule Ka	26h 28' 35"
2	Évita Muzic (FRA)	FDJ Nouvelle-Aquitaine Futuroscope	+ 4' 55"
3	Liane Lippert (GER)	Team Sunweb	+ 5' 35"
4	Marta Cavalli (ITA)	Valcar–Travel & Service	+ 5' 54"
5	Maria Novolodskaya (RUS)	Cogeas–Mettler–Look	+ 12' 16"
6	Niamh Fisher-Black (NZL)	Équipe Paule Ka	+ 13' 08"
7	Juliette Labous (FRA)	Team Sunweb	+ 14' 00"
8	Debora Silvestri (ITA)	Top Girls Fassa Bortolo	+ 16' 32"
9	Sara Casasola (ITA)	Servetto–Piumate–Beltrami TSA	+ 27' 06"
10	Maaike Boogaard (NED)	Alé BTC Ljubljana	+ 39' 24"

=== Italian rider classification ===
Final Italian rider classification (1–10)
Rank	Rider	Team	Time
1	Elisa Longo Borghini (ITA)	Trek–Segafredo	26h 28' 03"
2	Marta Cavalli (ITA)	Valcar–Travel & Service	+ 6' 26"
3	Katia Ragusa (ITA)	Astana	+ 7' 22"
4	Soraya Paladin (ITA)	CCC - Liv	+ 9' 08"
5	Erica Magnaldi (ITA)	Ceratizit–WNT Pro Cycling	+ 9' 58"
6	Tatiana Guderzo (ITA)	Alé BTC Ljubljana	+ 14' 08"
7	Debora Silvestri (ITA)	Top Girls Fassa Bortolo	+ 17' 04"
8	Elena Franchi (ITA)	Eurotarget–Bianchi–Vittoria	+ 18' 26"
9	Sara Casasola (ITA)	Servetto–Piumate–Beltrami TSA	+ 27' 38"
10	Sofia Bertizzolo (ITA)	CCC - Liv	+ 28' 20"

=== Teams classification ===
Final teams classification (1–10)
Rank	Team	Time
1	CCC - Liv	78h 50' 19"
2	Équipe Paule Ka	+ 43"
3	FDJ Nouvelle-Aquitaine Futuroscope	+ 10' 45"
4	Boels–Dolmans	+ 23' 05"
5	Trek–Segafredo	+ 25' 14"
6	Alé BTC Ljubljana	+ 26' 21"
7	Team Sunweb	+ 26' 36"
8	Canyon//SRAM	+ 32' 36"
9	Mitchelton–Scott	+ 38' 07"
10	Ceratizit–WNT Pro Cycling	+ 38' 09"

== Prize money ==
The prize money for the Giro Rosa 2020 will be divided as follows (all in Euros):

Finish place	Team Time Trial (stage 1)	Stage	General classification
1	1200	665	1330
2	800	400	800
3	600	280	560
4	500	255	510
5	400	240	480
6		215	430
7		180	360
8		155	310
9		155	310
10		155	310
11 to 15		100	200
16 to 20		70	140
Total	3500	3550	7100

There are additional prizes for classification winners.

	General classification	Points classification	Mountains classification	Young rider classification	Teams classification
1	5000	500	1000	1000	1000
2	1000	300	500	not awarded	500
3	1000	250	300	not awarded	500

== See also ==
- 2020 in women's road cycling
