= 2022 Paris–Roubaix Femmes =

Cycling race

2022 Paris–Roubaix Femmes avec Zwift
2022 UCI Women's World Tour, race 8 of 23
- Official event poster

Race details
- Dates: 16 April 2022
- Stages: 1
- Distance: 124.7 km (77.5 mi)
- Winning time: 3h 10' 54"

Results
	Winner	Elisa Longo Borghini (ITA)	(Trek–Segafredo)
	Second	Lotte Kopecky (BEL)	(SD Worx)
	Third	Lucinda Brand (NED)	(Trek–Segafredo)

The 2022 Paris–Roubaix Femmes (officially Paris–Roubaix Femmes avec Zwift) was a French road cycling one-day race that took place on 16 April 2022. It was the 2nd edition of Paris–Roubaix Femmes and the 8th event of the 2022 UCI Women's World Tour. The race was won by the Italian champion Elisa Longo Borghini, after a solo break with around 30 kilometres remaining, the second win by a long solo break in succession, after Lizzie Deignan's inaugural edition triumph in 2021.

== Route ==
The route used a near identical course to the first edition, with the only change being an additional starting circuit in Denain. The race finished on the velodrome in Roubaix after covering 124.7 kilometres (77.5 mi), with 29.2 kilometres (18.1 mi) of cobblestones, spread out over 17 sectors – including the famed Carrefour de l'Arbre and the Mons-en-Pévèle – both ranked at "five stars" in difficulty. The women covered the same final 17 sectors as the men's race.

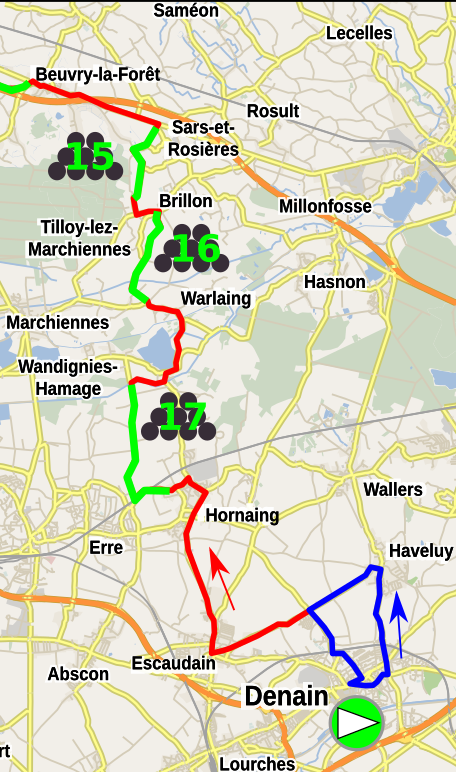
Start in Denain, before heading north

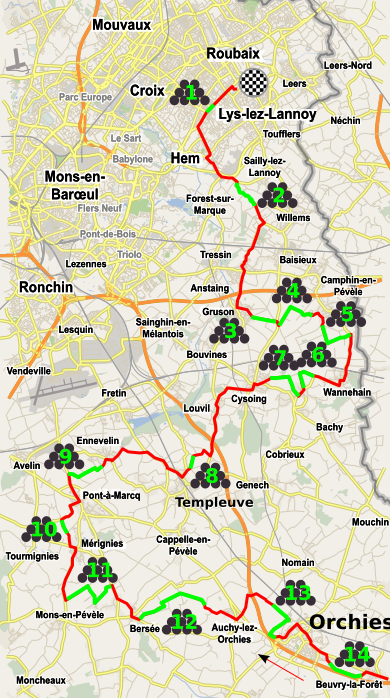
Route from Orchies to finish in Roubaix

== Teams ==
24 teams took part in the race. All 14 UCI Women's WorldTeams were automatically invited, and were joined by 10 UCI Women's Continental Teams. The three best 2021 UCI Women's Continental Teams (Ceratizit–WNT Pro Cycling, Parkhotel Valkenburg and Valcar–Travel & Service) received an automatic invitation, and the other seven teams were selected by Amaury Sport Organisation (ASO), the organisers of the race.

UCI Women's WorldTeams

- Canyon//SRAM
- EF Education–Tibco–SVB
- FDJ Nouvelle-Aquitaine Futuroscope
- Human Powered Health
- Liv Racing Xstra
- Movistar Team
- Roland Cogeas Edelweiss Squad
- Team BikeExchange–Jayco
- Team DSM
- Team Jumbo–Visma
- SD Worx
- Trek–Segafredo
- UAE Team ADQ
- Uno-X Pro Cycling Team

UCI Women's Continental Teams

- Ceratizit–WNT Pro Cycling
- Parkhotel Valkenburg
- Valcar–Travel & Service
- Le Col–Wahoo
- AG Insurance–NXTG
- Plantur–Pura
- Arkéa–Samsic
- Stade Rochelais Charente-Maritime
- Cofidis Women Team
- St Michel–Auber93

== Summary ==
Prior to the race, Amaury Sport Organisation announced that the race would be sponsored by Zwift for the next 4 years, and that the prize money for the winner would be substantially increased from €1,535 to €20,000, following criticism of the disparity between the men's and women's races.

2021 winner Lizzie Deignan did not defend her title, as she did not take part in the 2022 season so that she could look after her second child. Pre-race favourite Marianne Vos pulled out in the morning before the start after testing positive for COVID-19. Unlike the 2021 edition, the race was held in warm, sunny conditions in the traditional April slot in the calendar.

During the race, Elisa Balsamo was disqualified, after the use of a 'sticky bottle' to return to the peloton following a puncture with 48 km to go. With around 35 km to go, a breakaway of Lotte Kopecky, Marta Bastianelli and Lucinda Brand was caught by the peloton. A counter attack by Elisa Longo Borghini of Trek–Segafredo on the Templeuve sector of Pavé allowed her to go clear, eventually gaining a gap of around 40 seconds. Although a small group of riders gave chase, Borghini made it to Roubaix alone, and was able to celebrate in the Roubaix Velodrome before crossing the line - the second win for the Trek-Segafredo team in the race. Kopecky won the sprint finish of the chasing group to take second place.

== Result ==
Result
Rank	Rider	Team	Time
1	Elisa Longo Borghini (ITA)	Trek–Segafredo	3h 10' 54"
2	Lotte Kopecky (BEL)	SD Worx	+ 23"
3	Lucinda Brand (NED)	Trek–Segafredo	+ 23"
4	Elise Chabbey (SUI)	Canyon//SRAM	+ 23"
5	Marta Cavalli (ITA)	FDJ Nouvelle-Aquitaine Futuroscope	+ 23"
6	Floortje Mackaij (NED)	Team DSM	+23"
7	Ellen van Dijk (NED)	Trek–Segafredo	+ 23"
8	Chantal van den Broek-Blaak (NED)	SD Worx	+ 32"
9	Pfeiffer Georgi (GBR)	Team DSM	+ 2' 22"
10	Sandra Alonso (ESP)	Bizkaia–Durango	+ 2' 22"
