= 2022 La Flèche Wallonne Femmes =

Cycling race

2022 UCI Women's World Tour, race 9 of 23
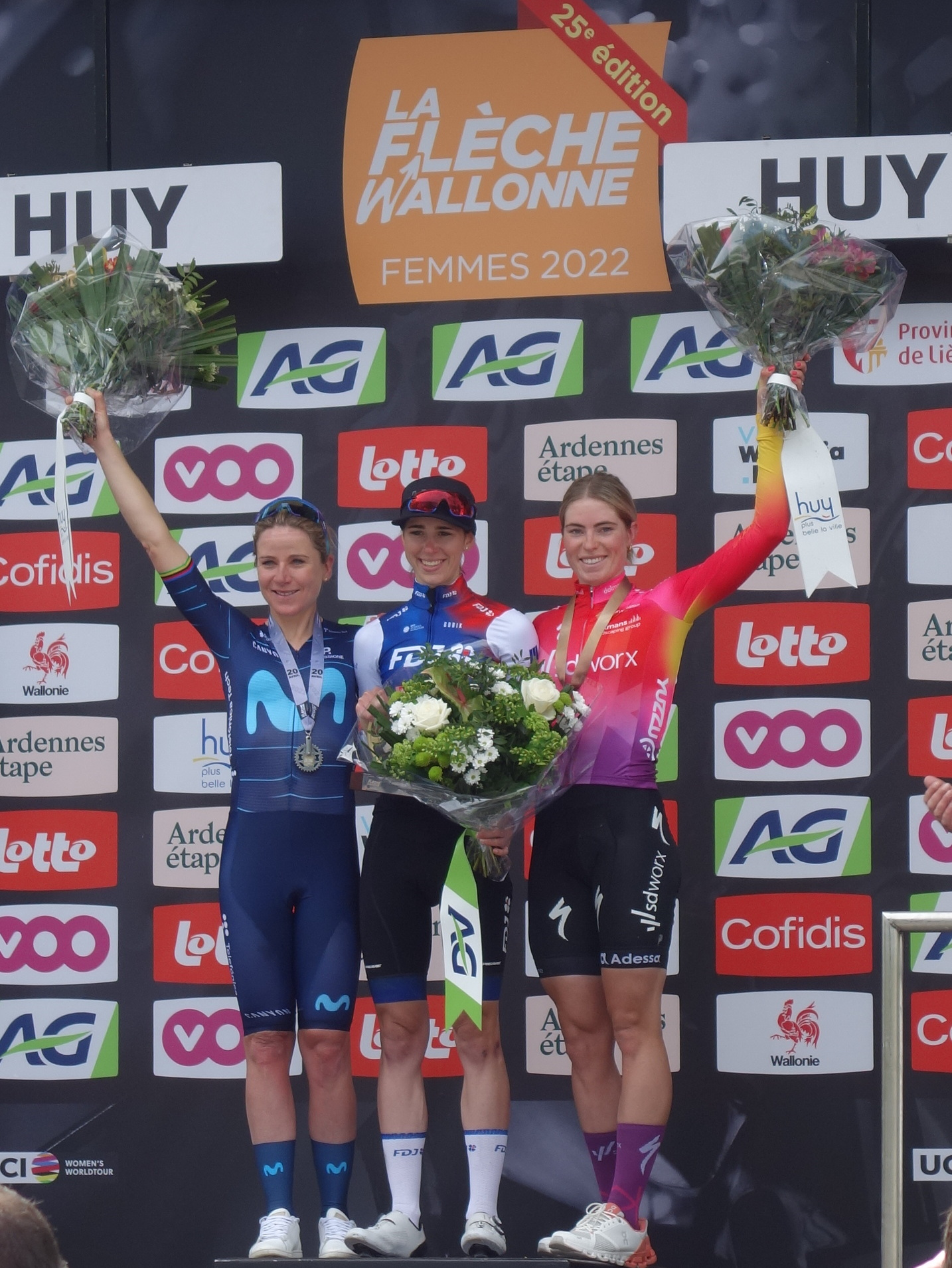
- Podium of the race

Race details
- Dates: 20 April 2022
- Stages: 1
- Distance: 133.4 km (82.9 mi)
- Winning time: 3h 38' 37"

Results
	Winner	Marta Cavalli (ITA)	(FDJ Nouvelle-Aquitaine Futuroscope)
	Second	Annemiek van Vleuten (NED)	(Movistar Team)
	Third	Demi Vollering (NED)	(SD Worx)

The 2022 La Flèche Wallonne Femmes was a Belgian road cycling one-day race that took place on 20 April 2022. It was the 25th edition of La Flèche Wallonne Femmes and the 9th event of the 2022 UCI Women's World Tour. Italian Marta Cavalli won the race for the first time.

== Route ==
The race started and finished in Huy, with the finish line on the top of the final ascent of the Mur de Huy - one of three ascents of the Mur on the route. The race covered the same final 90km as the men's race, totalling 130.2 km. There were 8 categorised climbs:

- 65 km: Côte de Cherave – 1.5 km climb at 7.6%
- 71 km: Mur de Huy – 1.3 km climb at 9.6%
- 84 km: Côte d'Ereffe – 2.1 km climb at 4.6%
- 96.5 km: Côte de Cherave – 1.5 km climb at 7.6%
- 102 km: Mur de Huy – 1.3 km climb at 9.6%
- 111.1 km: Côte d'Ereffe – 2.1 km climb at 4.6%
- 127.5 km: Côte de Cherave – 1.5 km climb at 7.6%
- 133.4 km: Mur de Huy – 1.3 km climb at 9.4%

== Summary ==
Seven-time winner of the race Anna van der Breggen retired from the sport at the end of 2021 and therefore did not defend her 2021 title.

In the race itself, a large breakaway of 15 riders was caught before the bottom of the final ascent of the Mur de Huy. On the climb, Annemiek van Vleuten of Movistar Team attacked with 400m to go on the steepest section of the ascent. However, Marta Cavalli of FDJ Nouvelle-Aquitaine Futuroscope was able to stay with van Vleuten, and passed her with around 50 metres to go before the line, winning the 2022 edition. Behind van Vleuten in third place was Demi Vollering of SD Worx, 10 seconds behind.

== Result ==
Result
Rank	Rider	Team	Time
1	Marta Cavalli (ITA)	FDJ Nouvelle-Aquitaine Futuroscope	3h 38' 37"
2	Annemiek van Vleuten (NED)	Movistar Team	+ 0"
3	Demi Vollering (NED)	SD Worx	+ 10"
4	Ashleigh Moolman (RSA)	SD Worx	+ 17"
5	Mavi Garcia (ESP)	UAE Team ADQ	+ 21"
6	Elisa Longo Borghini (ITA)	Trek–Segafredo	+ 30"
7	Liane Lippert (GER)	Team DSM	+ 33"
8	Kristabel Doebel-Hickok (USA)	EF Education–Tibco–SVB	+ 37"
9	Yara Kastelijn (NED)	Plantur–Pura	+ 40"
10	Ane Santesteban (ESP)	Team BikeExchange–Jayco	+ 42"

== See also ==
- 2022 in women's road cycling
