= Ane Santesteban =

Spanish cyclist (born 1990)

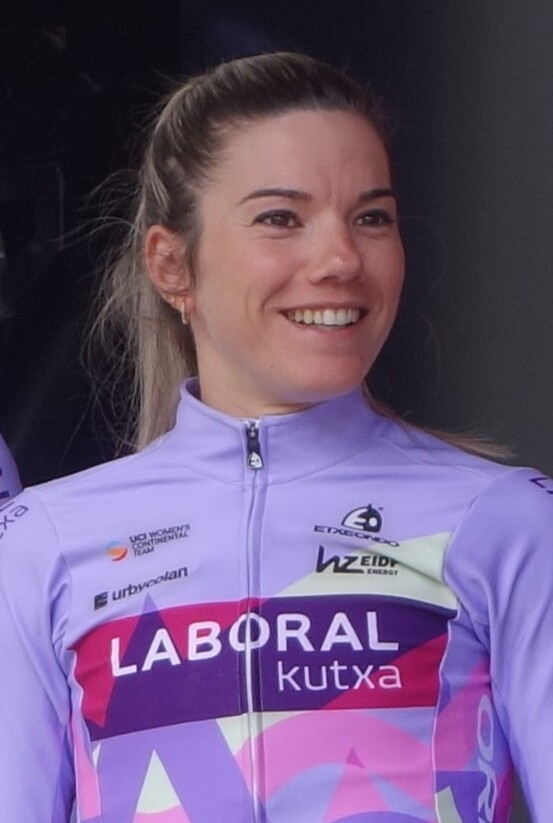
- Santesteban in 2024

Personal information
- Full name: Ane Santesteban González
- Born: 12 December 1990 (age 35) Errenteria, Basque Country, Spain

Cycling career
- Sport: Cycling
- Current team: Laboral Kutxa–Fundación Euskadi
- Discipline: Road
- Role: Rider
- Rider type: Climbing specialist

Professional teams
- 2009–2011: Debabarrena–Kirolgi
- 2012–2013: Bizkaia–Durango
- 2014: Alé–Cipollini
- 2015: Inpa Sottoli Giusfredi
- 2016–2018: Alé–Cipollini
- 2019–2020: WNT–Rotor Pro Cycling
- 2021–2023: Team BikeExchange
- 2024–: Laboral Kutxa–Fundación Euskadi
Medal record
Representing Spain
Mediterranean Games
Silver medal – second place	2018 Tarragona	Road race

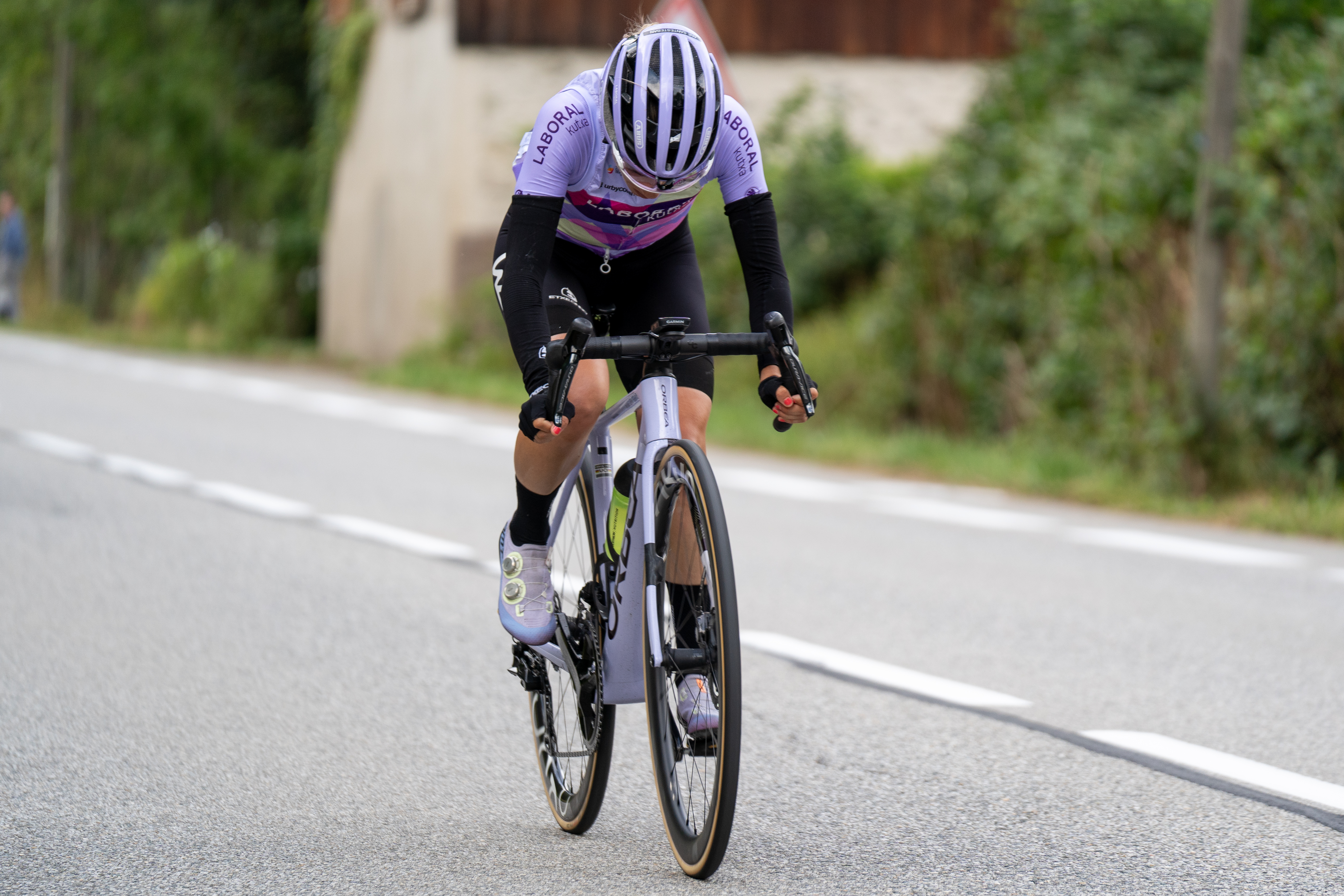
Ane Santesteban of team 'Laboral Kutxa-Fundación Euskadi' in stage 8 of the Tour de France Femmes 2024.

Ane Santesteban González (born 12 December 1990) is a Basque Spanish racing cyclist, who rides for UCI Women's ContinentalTeam Laboral Kutxa–Fundación Euskadi. She has competed in the women's road race at the UCI Road World Championships on ten occasions between 2009 and 2022, and the road race at the Olympics in 2016 and 2020.

== Major results ==
2012
3rd Road race, National Road Championships
2013
1st Road race, National Road Championships
2015
2nd Road race, National Road Championships
6th Overall Tour Cycliste Féminin International de l'Ardèche
6th Overall Giro della Toscana Int. Femminile – Memorial Michela Fanini
2016
5th Grand Prix de Plumelec-Morbihan Dames
9th Overall Gracia–Orlová
9th Durango-Durango Emakumeen Saria
10th Overall Tour Femenino de San Luis
2017
3rd Road race, National Road Championships
4th La Classique Morbihan
6th Durango-Durango Emakumeen Saria
2018
1st Basque rider classification, Emakumeen Euskal Bira
2nd Road race, Mediterranean Games
3rd Grand Prix de Plumelec-Morbihan Dames
5th Durango-Durango Emakumeen Saria
5th Giro dell'Emilia Internazionale Donne Elite
6th Overall Women's Tour de Yorkshire
9th Overall Giro Rosa
9th Overall Giro della Toscana Int. Femminile – Memorial Michela Fanini
9th La Course by Le Tour de France
2019
3rd Emakumeen Nafarroako Klasikoa
4th Grand Prix de Plumelec-Morbihan Dames
5th Overall Tour Cycliste Féminin International de l'Ardèche
7th Overall Giro della Toscana Int. Femminile – Memorial Michela Fanini
8th Overall Emakumeen Euskal Bira

1st Basque rider classification

9th La Course by Le Tour de France
2020
1st Mountains classification, Setmana Ciclista Valenciana
2nd Road race, National Road Championships
7th Overall Giro Rosa
9th Clasica Femenina Navarra
10th Durango-Durango Emakumeen Saria
2021
2nd Road race, National Road Championships
3rd Overall Tour Cycliste Féminin International de l'Ardèche
9th Emakumeen Nafarroako Klasikoa
9th Durango-Durango Emakumeen Saria
2022
2nd Clasica Femenina Navarra
2nd Gran Premio Ciudad de Eibar
3rd Tre Valli Varesine
6th Overall Challenge by La Vuelta
6th Emakumeen Nafarroako Klasikoa
9th Overall Vuelta a Burgos Feminas
10th La Flèche Wallonne
2023
2nd Durango-Durango Emakumeen Saria
5th Giro dell'Emilia Internazionale Donne Elite
8th Overall Tour de France Femmes
9th Clasica Femenina Navarra
10th Overall Giro Donne
2024
2nd Women Cycling Pro Costa De Almería
6th Grand Prix Féminin de Chambéry
9th Gran Premio Ciudad de Eibar
10th La Flèche Wallonne
10th Trofeo Palma Femina
10th Durango-Durango Emakumeen Saria
