= 2023 UAE Tour Women =

Emirati cycling race

2023 UCI Women's World Tour, race 3 of 27

Race details
- Dates: 9–12 February 2023
- Stages: 4
- Distance: 468 km (291 mi)

Results
Jersey awarded to the overall winner	Winner	Elisa Longo Borghini (ITA)	(Trek–Segafredo)
	Second	Gaia Realini (ITA)	(Trek–Segafredo)
	Third	Silvia Persico (ITA)	(UAE Team ADQ)
Jersey awarded to the points classification winner	Points	Charlotte Kool (NED)	(Team DSM)
Jersey awarded to the youth classification winner	Youth	Gaia Realini (ITA)	(Trek–Segafredo)
Jersey awarded to the sprints classification winner	Sprints	Agnieszka Skalniak-Sójka (POL)	(Canyon//SRAM)
	Team	UAE Team ADQ	

The 2023 UAE Tour Women was a road cycling stage race that took place between 9 and 12 February 2023 in the United Arab Emirates. It was the inaugural edition of the UAE Tour Women, and the third race of the 2023 UCI Women's World Tour.

The race was won by Italian rider Elisa Longo Borghini of Trek–Segafredo.

== Teams ==
Thirteen UCI Women's WorldTeams and seven UCI Women's Continental Teams took part in the race.

UCI Women's WorldTeams

- Canyon//SRAM
- FDJ–Suez
- Human Powered Health
- Liv Racing TeqFind
- Movistar Team
- Israel Premier Tech Roland
- Team Jayco–AlUla
- Team DSM
- SD Worx
- Trek–Segafredo
- UAE Team ADQ
- Uno-X Pro Cycling Team
- Fenix–Deceuninck

UCI Women's Continental Teams

- Ceratizit–WNT Pro Cycling
- Team Coop–Hitec Products
- Top Girls Fassa Bortolo
- Laboral Kutxa–Fundación Euskadi
- Bepink
- Zaaf Cycling Team
- St. Michel–Mavic–Auber93

== Route ==
The route was announced in January 2023, with three sprint stages and one mountain stage.

Stage characteristics and winners
Stage	Date	Course	Distance	Type	Stage winner
1	9 February	Port Rashid to Dubai Harbour	109 km (68 mi)	Flat stage	Charlotte Kool (NED)
2	10 February	Al Dhafra Castle to Al Mirfa	133 km (83 mi)	Flat stage	Lorena Wiebes (NED)
3	11 February	Hazza bin Zayed Stadium to Jebel Hafeet	107 km (66 mi)	Mountain stage	Elisa Longo Borghini (ITA)
4	12 February	Fatima Bint Mubarak Ladies Sports Academy to Abu Dhabi Breakwater	119 km (74 mi)	Flat stage	Charlotte Kool (NED)
Total			468 km (291 mi)		

== Result ==
The race was dominated by Trek–Segafredo, with Elisa Longo Borghini and her teammate Gaia Realini winning stage three to Jebel Hafeet by a minute ahead the peloton. Amanda Spratt of Trek–Segafredo retained the leaders jersey of the UCI Women's World Tour.

Final general classification
Rank	Rider	Team	Time
1	Elisa Longo Borghini (ITA)	Trek–Segafredo	12h 08' 48"
2	Gaia Realini (ITA)	Trek–Segafredo	+7"
3	Silvia Persico (ITA)	UAE Team ADQ	+1' 18"
4	Anna Shackley (GBR)	SD Worx	+1' 35"
5	Elise Chabbey (SUI)	Canyon//SRAM	+1' 58"
6	Mikayla Harvey (NZL)	UAE Team ADQ	+2' 02"
7	Soraya Paladin (ITA)	Canyon//SRAM	+2' 06"
8	Esmée Peperkamp (NED)	Team DSM	+2' 22"
9	Liane Lippert (GER)	Movistar Team	+2' 35"
10	Mareille Meijering (NED)	Zaaf Cycling Team	+2' 37"
