= 2021 GP de Plouay =

Cycling race

2021 UCI Women's World Tour, race 14 of 18

Race details
- Dates: 30 August 2021
- Stages: 1
- Distance: 150.2 km (93.3 mi)
- Winning time: 4h 06' 02"

Results
	Winner	Elisa Longo Borghini (ITA)	(Trek–Segafredo)
	Second	Gladys Verhulst (FRA)	(Arkéa Pro Cycling Team)
	Third	Kristen Faulkner (USA)	(Tibco–Silicon Valley Bank)

The twentieth edition of the 2021 GP de Plouay was part of the 2021 UCI Women's World Tour and was held on 30 August 2021, in Plouay, France. The race was won by Italian rider Elisa Longo Borghini of Trek–Segafredo.

== Teams ==
Riders from 15 teams took part in the race. Each team has a maximum of six riders.

UCI Women's WorldTeams

- Alé BTC Ljubljana
- Canyon//SRAM
- Liv Racing
- FDJ Nouvelle-Aquitaine Futuroscope
- Team BikeExchange
- Movistar Team
- SD Worx
- Team DSM
- Trek–Segafredo

UCI Women's Continental Teams

- Valcar–Travel & Service
- Parkhotel Valkenburg
- Arkéa Pro Cycling Team
- Tibco–Silicon Valley Bank
- Stade Rochelais Charente-Maritime
- Team Jumbo–Visma
- Massi–Tactic
- Ceratizit–WNT Pro Cycling

== Results ==
Final general classification

Rank	Rider	Team	Time
1	Elisa Longo Borghini (ITA)	Trek–Segafredo	4h 06' 02"
2	Gladys Verhulst (FRA)	Arkéa Pro Cycling Team	+ 0' 12"
3	Kristen Faulkner (USA)	Tibco–Silicon Valley Bank	+ 0' 12"
4	Sofia Bertizzolo (ITA)	Liv Racing	+ 0' 12"
5	Evita Muzic (FRA)	FDJ Nouvelle-Aquitaine Futuroscope	+ 0' 12"
6	Eugenia Bujak (SLO)	Alé BTC Ljubljana	+ 0' 12"
7	Lizzie Deignan (GBR)	Trek–Segafredo	+ 0' 12"
8	Coryn Rivera (USA)	Team DSM	+ 0' 12"
9	Ashleigh Moolman-Pasio (RSA)	SD Worx	+ 0' 12"
10	Anna Henderson (GBR)	Team Jumbo–Visma	+ 0' 12"
