= 2022 The Women's Tour =

UCI Women's World Tour, race 14 of 23
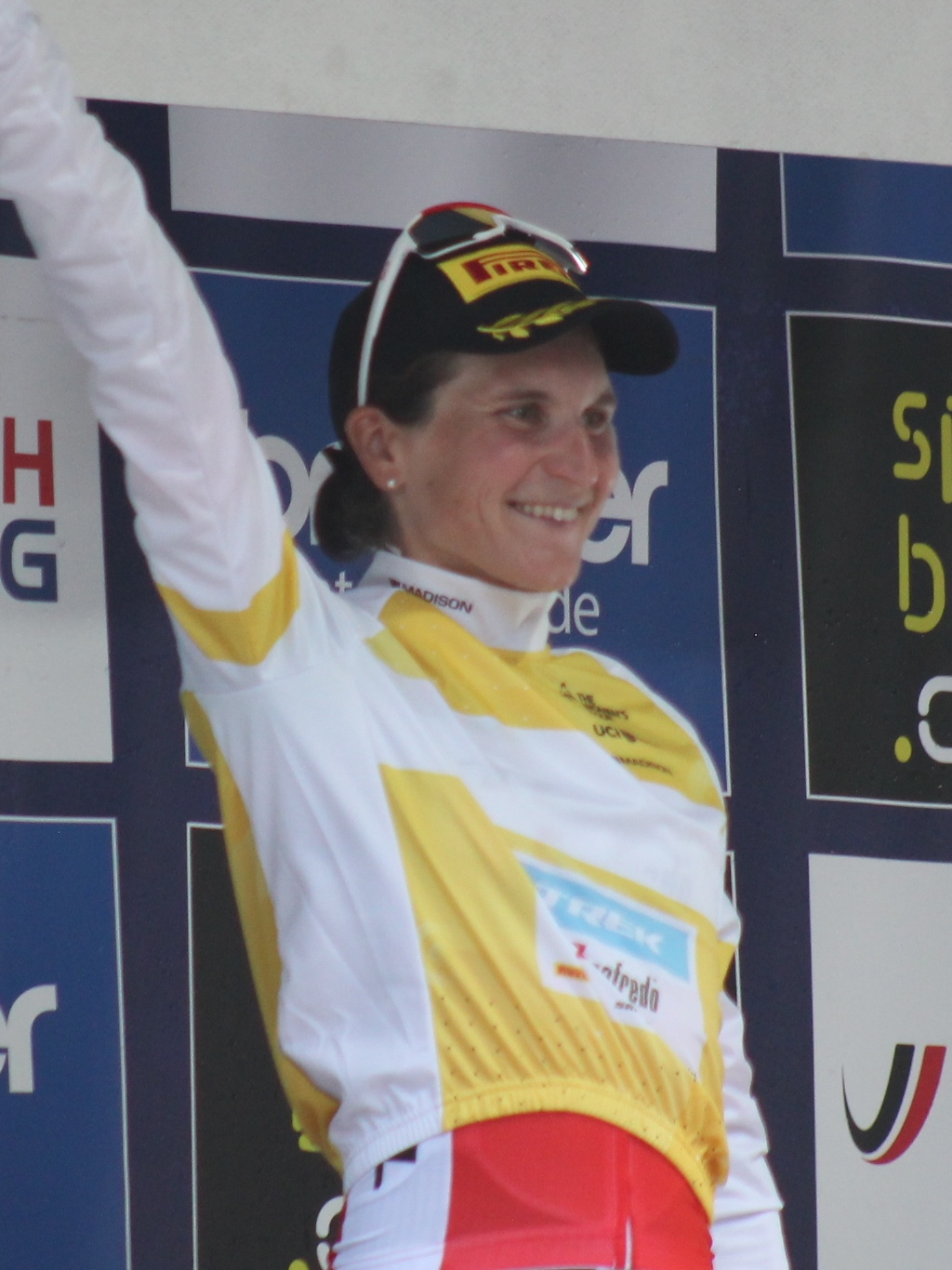
- Elisa Longo Borghini, winner of 2022 Women's Tour

Race details
- Dates: 6–11 June 2021
- Stages: 6
- Distance: 736.3 km (457.5 mi)
- Winning time: 19h 19' 07"

Results
Jersey awarded to the overall winner	Winner	Elisa Longo Borghini (ITA)	(Trek–Segafredo)
	Second	Grace Brown (AUS)	(FDJ Nouvelle-Aquitaine Futuroscope)
	Third	Katarzyna Niewiadoma (POL)	(Canyon//SRAM)
Jersey awarded to the points classification winner	Points	Lorena Wiebes (NED)	(Team DSM)
Jersey awarded to the mountains classification winner	Mountains	Elise Chabbey (SUI)	(Canyon//SRAM)
Jersey awarded to the sprints classification winner	Sprints	Maike van der Duin (NED)	(Le Col–Wahoo)
	Combativity	Grace Brown (AUS)	(FDJ Nouvelle-Aquitaine Futuroscope)
	Team	Canyon//SRAM	

The 2022 The Women's Tour was the eighth staging of The Women's Tour, a women's cycling stage race held in Great Britain. It ran from 6 to 11 June 2022, as part of the 2022 UCI Women's World Tour.

The race was won by Elisa Longo Borghini of Trek–Segafredo, by a margin of just 1 second.

== Route ==
The route was announced in spring 2022, with stage 5 having a mountain top finish on Black Mountain in the Brecon Beacons in Wales. The finish was noted to be the hardest mountain top finish of a Women's Tour, with an average gradient of 5.3%.

Stage schedule
Stage	Date	Course	Distance	Type	Winner
1	6 June	Colchester to Bury St Edmunds	142.1 km (88.3 mi)	Flat stage	Clara Copponi (FRA)
2	7 June	Harlow to Harlow	92.1 km (57.2 mi)	Flat stage	Lorena Wiebes (NED)
3	8 June	Tewkesbury to Gloucester	107.9 km (67.0 mi)	Hilly stage	Lorena Wiebes (NED)
4	9 June	Wrexham to Welshpool	144.7 km (89.9 mi)	Hilly stage	Grace Brown (AUS)
5	10 June	Pembrey Country Park to Black Mountain	106.6 km (66.2 mi)	Mountain stage	Elisa Longo Borghini (ITA)
6	11 June	Chipping Norton to Oxford	142.9 km (88.8 mi)	Flat stage	Lorena Wiebes (NED)
Total		736.3 km (457.5 mi)			

== Summary ==
97 riders from 17 teams were entered in the race, with 13 of the teams being from the UCI Women's World Tour. For the first time, all stages were broadcast live.

Elisa Longo Borghini came third in the final bunch sprint in Oxford, gaining 4 bonus seconds and taking the overall classification by just 1 second from Grace Brown. To honour journalist Richard Moore, a special award for the rider who "went above and beyond with the media" was presented to Clara Copponi.

== Classification leadership table ==
Classification leadership by stage
Stage	Winner	General classification	Points classification	Mountains classification	Sprints classification	Team classification
1	Clara Copponi	Clara Copponi	Clara Copponi (Note: On stage 2, Sofia Bertizzolo, who was second in the points classification, wore the pink jersey, because first-placed Clara Copponi wore the yellow jersey as the leader of the general classification. For the same reason, Lorena Wiebes wore the pink jersey in stage 3)	Christine Majerus	Maike van der Duin	FDJ Nouvelle-Aquitaine Futuroscope
2	Lorena Wiebes	Clara Copponi	Clara Copponi	Christine Majerus	Maike van der Duin	Canyon//SRAM
3	Lorena Wiebes	Lorena Wiebes	Lorena Wiebes (Note: On stage 4, Clara Copponi, who was second in the points classification, wore the pink jersey, because first-placed Lorena Wiebes wore the yellow jersey as the leader of the general classification.)	Christine Majerus	Maike van der Duin	Canyon//SRAM
4	Grace Brown	Grace Brown	Lorena Wiebes	Elise Chabbey	Maike van der Duin	Canyon//SRAM
5	Elisa Longo Borghini	Grace Brown	Lorena Wiebes	Elise Chabbey	Maike van der Duin	Canyon//SRAM
6	Lorena Wiebes	Elisa Longo Borghini	Lorena Wiebes	Elise Chabbey	Maike van der Duin	Canyon//SRAM
Final		Elisa Longo Borghini	Lorena Wiebes	Elise Chabbey	Maike van der Duin	Canyon–SRAM

== Result ==
Final general classification
Rank	Rider	Team	Time
1	Elisa Longo Borghini (ITA)	Trek–Segafredo	19h 19' 07"
2	Grace Brown (AUS)	FDJ Nouvelle-Aquitaine Futuroscope	+1"
3	Katarzyna Niewiadoma (POL)	Canyon//SRAM	+5"
4	Alexandra Manly (AUS)	Team BikeExchange–Jayco	+24"
5	Ashleigh Moolman Pasio (RSA)	SD Worx	+32"
6	Elise Chabbey (SUI)	Canyon//SRAM	+49"
7	Kristen Faulkner (USA)	Team BikeExchange–Jayco	+54"
8	Veronica Ewers (USA)	EF Education–Tibco–SVB	+1'45"
9	Sofia Bertizzolo (ITA)	UAE Team ADQ	+1'50"
10	Mikayla Harvey (NZL)	Canyon//SRAM	+1'56"

== See also ==
- 2022 in women's road cycling
