= 2024 Strade Bianche Donne =

Cycling race

2024 UCI Women's World Tour, race 5 of 27
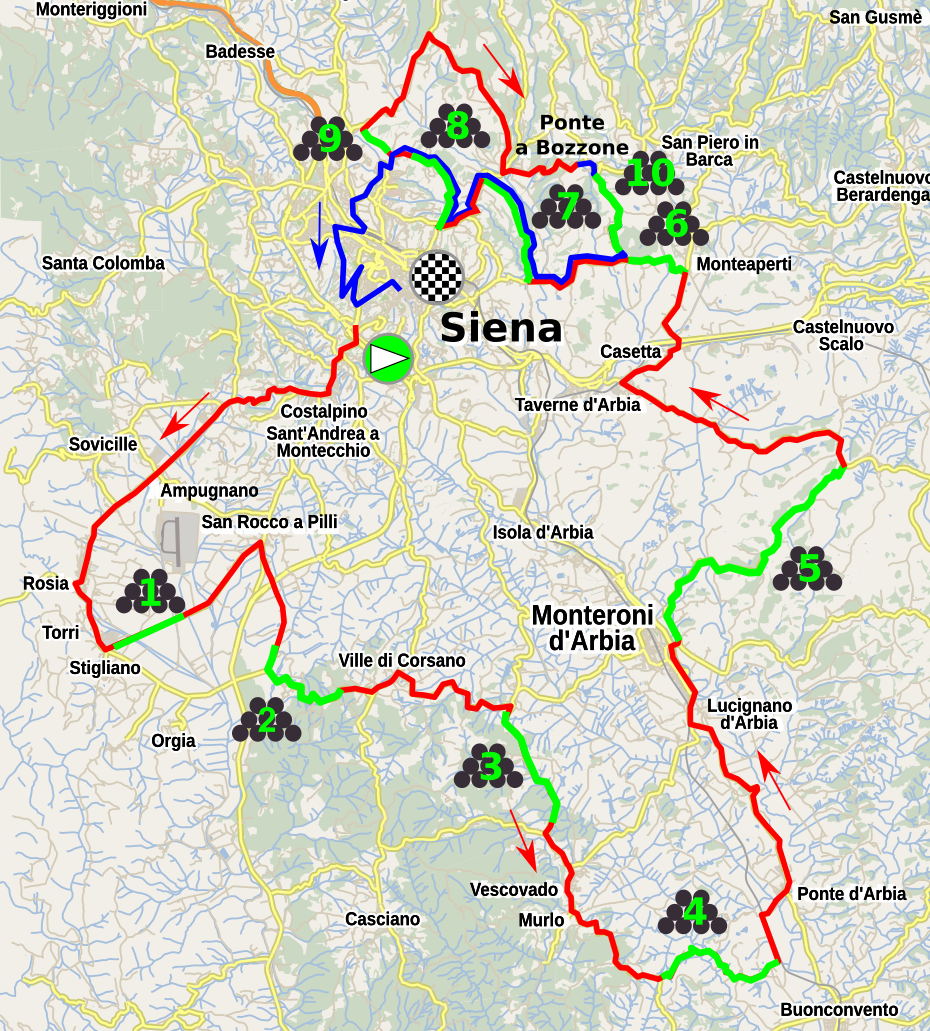

Race details
- Dates: 2 March 2024
- Stages: 1
- Distance: 137 km (85.13 mi)
- Winning time: 3h 55' 43"

Results
	Winner	Lotte Kopecky (BEL)	(Team SD Worx–Protime)
	Second	Elisa Longo Borghini (ITA)	(Lidl–Trek)
	Third	Demi Vollering (NED)	(Team SD Worx–Protime)

The 2024 Strade Bianche Donne was an Italian road cycling one-day race that took place on 2 March. It was the tenth edition of Strade Bianche Donne and the fifth event of the 2024 UCI Women's World Tour. The race was won by Belgian rider Lotte Kopecky of Team SD Worx–Protime.

== Route ==
The race starts and finishes in Siena, Italy. Taking place over 137 kilometres (85 mi) (a similar distance to previous editions of the race), the course contains 40 km of 'strade bianche' gravel roads spread over twelve sectors, four sectors over a total of 10 km more than in previous editions of the race. The final kilometre in Siena to the finish line in the Piazza del Campo has a maximum gradient of 16%.

== Teams ==
Fourteen UCI Women's WorldTeams and ten UCI Women's Continental Teams make up the twenty-four teams that will compete in the race.

UCI Women's WorldTeams

- AG Insurance–Soudal
- Canyon–SRAM
- Ceratizit–WNT Pro Cycling
- FDJ–Suez
- Fenix–Deceuninck
- Human Powered Health
- Lidl–Trek
- Liv AlUla Jayco
- Movistar Team
- Team DSM–Firmenich PostNL
- Team SD Worx–Protime
- Visma–Lease a Bike
- UAE Team ADQ
- Uno-X Mobility

UCI Women's Continental Teams

- Aromitalia 3T Vaiano
- Bepink–Bongioanni
- BTC City Ljubljana Zhiraf Ambedo
- Cofidis
- EF Education–Cannondale
- Isolmant–Premac–Vittoria
- Laboral Kutxa–Fundación Euskadi
- Tashkent City Women Professional Cycling Team
- Team Mendelspeck Ge-Man
- Top Girls Fassa Bortolo

== Result ==
Result
Rank	Rider	Team	Time
1	Lotte Kopecky (BEL)	Team SD Worx–Protime	3h 55' 43"
2	Elisa Longo Borghini (ITA)	Lidl–Trek	+ 4"
3	Demi Vollering (NED)	Team SD Worx–Protime	+ 26"
4	Katarzyna Niewiadoma (POL)	Canyon–SRAM	+ 26"
5	Shirin van Anrooij (NED)	Lidl–Trek	+ 40"
6	Kristen Faulkner (USA)	EF Education–Cannondale	+ 41"
7	Riejanne Markus (NED)	Visma–Lease a Bike	+ 1' 01"
8	Elise Chabbey (SUI)	Canyon–SRAM	+ 1' 54"
9	Marianne Vos (NED)	Visma–Lease a Bike	+ 1' 54"
10	Évita Muzic (FRA)	FDJ–Suez	+ 1' 54"
