= Elisa Longo Borghini =

Italian racing cyclist (born 1991)

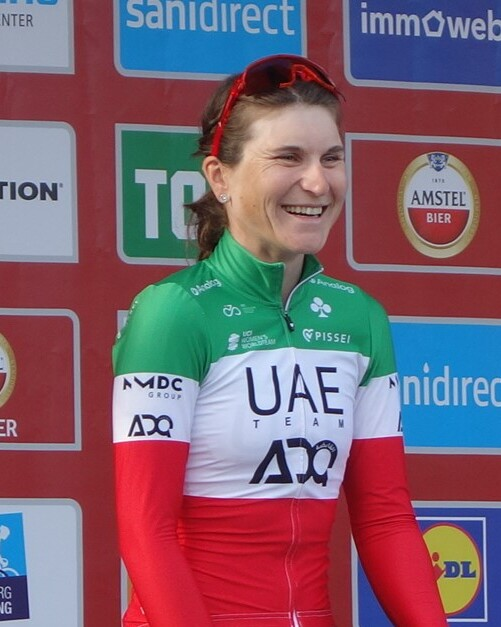
- Longo Borghini in 2025

Personal information
- Born: 10 December 1991 (age 34) Verbania, Italy
- Height: 1.70 m (5 ft 7 in)
- Weight: 59 kg (130 lb)

Cycling career
- Sport: Cycling
- Current team: UAE Team L'Imad
- Discipline: Road
- Role: Rider
- Rider type: All-rounder

Professional teams
- 2011: Top Girls–Fassa Bortolo
- 2012–2014: Hitec Products–Mistral Home
- 2015–2018: Wiggle–Honda
- 2019–2023: Trek–Segafredo
- 2023–2024: Lidl–Trek
- 2025–: UAE Team ADQ

Major wins
- Major Tours Giro d'Italia General classification (2024, 2025) Mountains classification (2016) Young rider classification (2012) 4 individual stages (2020, 2023, 2024, 2026) Stage races La Route de France (2015) Tour de Bretagne (2014) Trophée d'Or Féminin (2014) Emakumeen Euskal Bira (2019) The Women's Tour (2022) UAE Tour (2023, 2025, 2026) One-day races and Classics National Road Race Championships (2017, 2020, 2021, 2023, 2024, 2025, 2026) National Time Trial Championships (2014, 2016, 2017, 2020–2023) Trofeo Alfredo Binda (2013, 2021) Tour of Flanders (2015, 2024) Paris–Roubaix (2022) Strade Bianche (2017) Brabantse Pijl (2024, 2025) Dwars door Vlaanderen (2025) GP de Plouay (2021)
Medal record
Women's road bicycle racing
Representing Italy
Olympic Games
Bronze medal – third place	2016 Rio de Janeiro	Road race
Bronze medal – third place	2020 Tokyo	Road race
World Championships
Silver medal – second place	2022 Wollongong	Mixed team relay
Bronze medal – third place	2012 Valkenburg	Road race
Bronze medal – third place	2020 Imola	Road race
Bronze medal – third place	2021 Flanders	Mixed team relay
Bronze medal – third place	2024 Zurich	Road race
Bronze medal – third place	2024 Zurich	Mixed team relay
European Championships
Gold medal – first place	2021 Trentino	Mixed team relay
Silver medal – second place	2020 Plouay	Road race
Bronze medal – third place	2016 Plumelec	Road race

Elisa Longo Borghini (born 10 December 1991) is an Italian professional road cyclist, who rides for UCI Women's WorldTeam UAE Team L'Imad.

Longo Borghini is a two-time winner of the Giro d'Italia Women (2024 and 2025), as well as two bronze medals in the road race at the Summer Olympic Games, taking third-place finishes in Rio de Janeiro and Tokyo. She has also won three bronze medals in the equivalent event at the UCI Road World Championships, doing so in 2012 and 2020 and 2024. She has won several races often considered classics of women's cycling, including: Trofeo Alfredo Binda in 2013 and 2021, Tour of Flanders in 2015 and 2024, Strade Bianche in 2017, and Paris–Roubaix Femmes in 2022.

== Career ==
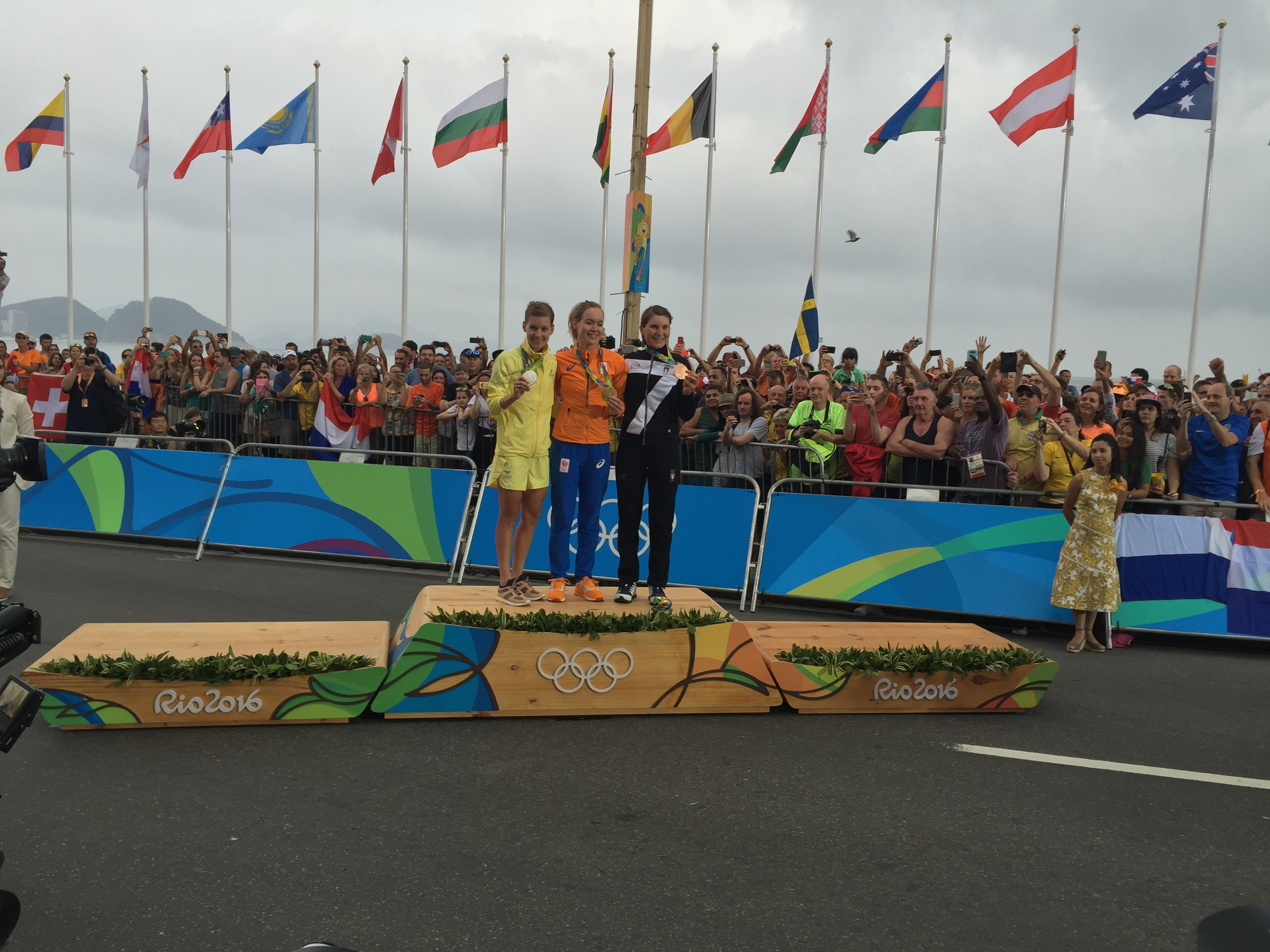
Longo Borghini after winning bronze in the women's road race at the 2016 Summer Olympics

Longo Borghini turned professional in 2011, joining the Top Girls Fassa Bortolo team. In 2012, she rode in the road race at the 2012 UCI Road World Championships in Valkenburg, where she won the bronze medal.

In 2013, she won her first major title at the Trofeo Alfredo Binda-Comune di Cittiglio. In 2014, she won her first national championship by winning the time trial.

=== Wiggle–Honda ===
On 30 September 2014 it was announced she would ride for Wiggle–Honda in the 2015 season.

In 2015, she won her first cycling monument, winning the Tour of Flanders. In 2016, she won a bronze medal at the individual road race at the Olympic Games in Rio de Janeiro. She won the national time trial championship for the second time.

In 2017, she won Strade Bianche Women and finished 2nd at the Giro Rosa, as well as winning the Italian rider classification for the third time. She also became national time trial champion for the third time, winning the road race as well.

=== Trek–Segafredo ===
In August 2018 Longo Borghini confirmed that she would be joining the new Trek–Segafredo team for 2019, after the Wiggle team had announced their demise.

In 2020, she became the Italian national champion after winning both the road race and time trial at the national championships. She finished 3rd at the Giro Rosa, winning the Italian rider classification for the sixth time. She also rode in the road race at the 2020 UCI Road World Championships in Imola, where she won the bronze medal.

In 2021, she won Trofeo Alfredo Binda for the second time, with two 3rd places at Paris–Roubaix Femmes and Liège–Bastogne–Liège Femmes. In July 2021, she competed in the 137-kilometre (85-mile)-long women's Olympic road race in Tokyo, and won the bronze medal. She followed an attack by Annemiek van Vleuten with 2.1 kilometres (1.3 miles) to go, with Van Vleuten securing second place and Longo Borghini securing third place. She also won the road race and time trial at the national championships for the second year in a row. She also rode in the mixed team relay at the 2021 UCI Road World Championships in Flanders, where she won the bronze medal.

In 2022, she won her second cycling monument, winning Paris–Roubaix Femmes. In July 2022, she was named as one of the pre-race favourites for the first edition of the Tour de France Femmes. She ultimately finished the race in sixth place overall. She then won The Women's Tour by just one second, as well as winning the time trial at the national championships for the third year in a row. She rode in the mixed team relay at the 2022 UCI Road World Championships in Wollongong, where she won the silver medal.

In 2023, Longo Borghini won the UAE Tour Women at the start of the year. In the Giro Donne, she was considered a favourite prior to the race. However, she crashed out of the race on stage 5 while 2nd overall. The Trek–Segafredo team rebranded as Lidl–Trek prior to the Tour de France Femmes, where once again she was considered a favourite. However she withdrew from the race before stage 7 due to illness while 4th overall.

In July 2024, Longo Borghini become the first home winner of the Women's Giro d'Italia since 2008. In August, she skipped Tour de France Femmes due to the lingering effects of a training crash.

=== Team UAE ADQ ===
In February 2025, Longo Borghini won the UAE Tour, her second victory in the event, and she also won stage 3.

== Personal life ==
Longo Borghini is the daughter of cross country skier Guidina Dal Sasso. Her older brother Paolo Longo Borghini also competed professionally as a cyclist, between 2004 and 2014. In 2023 she married fellow cyclist Jacopo Mosca, who rides for the men's Lidl–Trek team.

== Major results ==
2011
5th Omloop Het Nieuwsblad
UEC European Under-23 Road Championships

6th Road race
8th Time trial

10th Omloop van het Hageland
2012
1st Trofeo Oro in Euro
2nd Time trial, National Road Championships
3rd Road race, UCI Road World Championships
3rd Time trial, UEC European Under-23 Road Championships
3rd Omloop van het Hageland
3rd Gooik–Geraardsbergen–Gooik
3rd GP de Plouay
5th Overall Thüringen Rundfahrt

1st Young rider classification
1st Mountains classification
1st Stage 5

6th Overall Holland Ladies Tour
7th Omloop Het Nieuwsblad
7th Le Samyn
9th Overall Giro d'Italia

1st Young rider classification

2013
1st Trofeo Alfredo Binda
2nd Time trial, National Road Championships
2nd Overall Tour of Zhoushan Island
2nd Overall Emakumeen Euskal Bira

1st Mountains classification
1st Stage 4

2nd La Flèche Wallonne
3rd Chrono des Nations
4th Overall Giro del Trentino
4th Le Samyn
4th Tour of Flanders
4th Durango-Durango Emakumeen Saria
6th Ronde van Gelderland
8th Road race, UCI Road World Championships
9th Omloop van het Hageland
2014
1st Time trial, National Road Championships
1st Trophée d'Or

1st Mountains classification
1st Stage 4

1st Overall Tour de Bretagne

1st Mountains classification
1st Prologue & Stage 3

2nd Grand Prix de Plumelec-Morbihan
3rd Cholet Pays de Loire
3rd La Flèche Wallonne
3rd Gooik–Geraardsbergen–Gooik
4th Tour of Flanders
5th Overall Giro d'Italia

1st Italian rider classification

5th Durango-Durango Emakumeen Saria
6th Overall Holland Ladies Tour

1st Young rider classification

6th Trofeo Alfredo Binda
7th Ronde van Gelderland
7th GP de Plouay
7th Chrono Champenois-Trophée Européen
8th Le Samyn
10th Omloop van het Hageland
2015
1st Overall La Route de France

1st Stages 3 & 5

1st Tour of Flanders
1st Giro dell'Emilia
2nd Road race, National Road Championships
2nd Philadelphia Cycling Classic
3rd Strade Bianche
4th Road race, UCI Road World Championships
4th Trofeo Alfredo Binda
5th Overall Holland Ladies Tour
5th Marianne Vos Classic
5th Holland Hills Classic
8th Overall Giro d'Italia

1st Italian rider classification

9th GP de Plouay
2016
National Road Championships

1st Time trial
2nd Road race

1st Giro dell'Emilia
1st Mountains classification, Giro d'Italia
2nd Durango-Durango Emakumeen Saria
2nd Philadelphia Cycling Classic
Olympic Games

3rd Road race
5th Time trial

UEC European Road Championships

3rd Road race
7th Time trial

3rd Overall The Women's Tour
4th Overall Emakumeen Euskal Bira
4th Strade Bianche
5th Overall Festival Luxembourgeois du cyclisme féminin Elsy Jacobs
5th Tour of Flanders
5th La Flèche Wallonne
9th Overall Belgium Tour
9th GP de Plouay
2017
National Road Championships

1st Time trial
1st Road race

1st Strade Bianche
2nd Overall Giro d'Italia

1st Italian rider classification

3rd La Course by Le Tour de France
4th Ronde van Drenthe
4th Gooik–Geraardsbergen–Gooik
5th Omloop Het Nieuwsblad
5th Amstel Gold Race
9th Trofeo Alfredo Binda
9th Liège–Bastogne–Liège
10th Overall The Women's Tour
10th Tour of Flanders
2018
1st Road race, Mediterranean Games
3rd Strade Bianche
4th Durango-Durango Emakumeen Saria
5th Overall Emakumeen Euskal Bira
6th Overall The Women's Tour

1st Mountains classification

6th Time trial, UEC European Road Championships
7th Tour of Guangxi
8th Overall Madrid Challenge by La Vuelta
9th UCI Road World Championships – Women's time trial
9th Overall Tour de Yorkshire
10th Overall Giro Rosa

1st Italian rider classification

10th Trofeo Alfredo Binda
2019
1st Overall Emakumeen Euskal Bira

1st Points classification
1st Mountains classification
1st Stage 4

1st Vårgårda West Sweden TTT
2nd Giro dell'Emilia
3rd Team relay, UEC European Road Championships
3rd Time trial, National Road Championships
5th Road race, UCI Road World Championships
5th Overall Herald Sun Tour
5th Cadel Evans Great Ocean Road Race
6th La Course by Le Tour de France
8th Overall Giro Rosa

1st Italian rider classification

8th Dwars door Vlaanderen
9th Liège–Bastogne–Liège
10th Overall The Women's Tour
2020
National Road Championships

1st Time trial
1st Road race

2nd Road race, UEC European Road Championships
2nd Overall UCI Women's World Tour
2nd Overall Challenge by La Vuelta
2nd Clasica Femenina Navarra
3rd Road race, UCI Road World Championships
3rd Overall Giro Rosa

1st Italian rider classification
1st Stages 1 (TTT) & 8
Held after Stage 1

3rd Durango-Durango Emakumeen Saria
4th Emakumeen Nafarroako Klasikoa
5th Strade Bianche
5th La Flèche Wallonne
6th La Course by Le Tour de France
7th Three Days of Bruges–De Panne
8th Tour of Flanders
10th Gent–Wevelgem
2021
1st Team relay, UEC European Road Championships
National Road Championships

1st Time trial
1st Road race

1st GP de Plouay
1st Trofeo Alfredo Binda
1st Stage 1 (TTT) Giro Rosa
2nd Strade Bianche
Olympic Games

3rd Road race
10th Time trial

3rd Team relay, UCI Road World Championships
3rd Paris–Roubaix
3rd La Flèche Wallonne
3rd Liège–Bastogne–Liège
3rd Emakumeen Nafarroako Klasikoa
4th Tour of Flanders
7th Overall Challenge by La Vuelta
8th Amstel Gold Race
10th Omloop Het Nieuwsblad
2022
1st Time trial, National Road Championships
1st Overall The Women's Tour

1st Stage 5

1st Paris–Roubaix
1st Tre Valli Varesine
1st Giro dell'Emilia
UCI Road World Championships

2nd Team relay
10th Road race

2nd Overall Challenge by La Vuelta

1st Stage 1 (TTT)

3rd Overall Tour de Romandie
4th Overall Giro Donne
5th Liège–Bastogne–Liège
6th Overall Tour de France
6th La Flèche Wallonne
8th Strade Bianche
2023
National Road Championships

1st Time trial
1st Road race

1st Overall UAE Tour

1st Stage 3

2nd Liège–Bastogne–Liège
3rd Overall Tour de Suisse
3rd Tour of Flanders
10th Omloop Het Nieuwsblad
2024
National Road Championships

1st Road race
2nd Time trial

1st Overall Giro d'Italia

1st Stage 1 (ITT)

1st Tour of Flanders
1st Brabantse Pijl
1st Giro dell'Emilia
1st Trofeo Oro in Euro
2nd Liège–Bastogne–Liège
UCI Road World Championships

3rd Road race
3rd Team relay

3rd Overall La Vuelta Femenina
3rd Overall Tour de Suisse
3rd Omloop Het Nieuwsblad
3rd La Flèche Wallonne
5th Amstel Gold Race
6th Dwars door Vlaanderen
Olympic Games

8th Time trial
9th Road race

2025
National Road Championships

1st Road race
2nd Time trial

1st Overall Giro d'Italia
1st Overall UAE Tour

1st Stage 3

1st Brabantse Pijl
1st Dwars door Vlaanderen
1st Tre Valli Varesine
1st Trofeo Tessile & Moda
3rd La Flèche Wallonne
10th Road race, UEC European Championships
10th Trofeo Alfredo Binda
2026
National Road Championships

1st Road race
1st Time trial

1st Overall UAE Tour

1st Stage 4

1st Team relay
3rd 2026 UCI Road World Championships – Women's road race
3rd Overall Tour de France
4th UCI Road World Championships – Women's time trial
4th Overall Giro d'Italia

1st Stage 9

8th Tour of Flanders
9th Overall Tour de Suisse

1st Stage 2

=== General classification results timeline ===
Major Tours	2011	2012	2013	2014	2015	2016	2017	2018	2019	2020	2021	2022	2023	2024	2025	2026
La Vuelta Femenina	Race did not exist												—	3	—	—
Giro d'Italia Femminile	18	9	—	5	8	11	2	10	8	3	14	4	DNF	1	1	4
Tour de France Femmes	Race did not exist											6	DNF	—	DNF	3
Stage race	2011	2012	2013	2014	2015	2016	2017	2018	2019	2020	2021	2022	2023	2024	2025	2026
Emakumeen Euskal Bira	17	—	2	—	—	4	—	5	1	Race no longer exists						
Trophée d'Or Féminin	11	—	—	1	—	Race no longer exists										
Tour de Bretagne Féminin	—	—	—	1	—	—	Not held		—	Not held		—	—	—	NH	—
La Route de France	NH	—	—	—	1	—	Race no longer exists									
The Women's Tour	Race did not exist			25	20	3	10	6	10	NH	—	1	NH	—	—	—
Challenge by La Vuelta	Race did not exist				One day race			8	—	2	7	2	Replaced			
UAE Tour Women	Race did not exist												1	7	1	1

=== Classics results timeline ===
Monument	2011	2012	2013	2014	2015	2016	2017	2018	2019	2020	2021	2022	2023	2024	2025	2026
Milan–San Remo	Not held														11	—
Tour of Flanders	52	23	4	4	1	5	10	—	17	8	4	33	3	1	DNF	8
Paris–Roubaix	Race did not exist									NH	3	1	21	—	—	—
Liège–Bastogne–Liège	Race did not exist						9	DNF	9	25	3	5	2	2	48	—
Classic	2011	2012	2013	2014	2015	2016	2017	2018	2019	2020	2021	2022	2023	2024	2025	2026
Omloop Het Nieuwsblad	5	7	12	27	17	16	5	11	37	—	10	43	10	3	—	—
Strade Bianche	Race did not exist				3	4	1	3	—	5	2	8	—	2	55	4
Ronde van Drenthe	24	20	—	16	25	69	4	—	—	NH	—	—	—	Race no longer exists		
Trofeo Alfredo Binda	25	25	1	6	4	—	9	10	33	NH	1	12	—	—	10	16
Gent–Wevelgem	DNE	—	—	—	—	15	42	72	77	10	33	43	—	33	65	—
Dwars door Vlaanderen	—	—	—	—	—	—	—	—	8	NH	30	25	11	6	1	22
Brabantse Pijl	Race did not exist					—	—	—	—	—	—	—	—	1	1	—
Amstel Gold Race	Race did not exist						5	12	14	NH	8	—	28	5	35	—
La Flèche Wallonne	14	76	2	3	18	5	—	11	20	5	3	6	17	3	3	—
Open de Suède Vårgårda	38	—	—	—	17	—	—	—	DNF	Not held		—	Race no longer exists			
GP de Plouay	19	3	DNF	7	9	9	34	12	37	29	1	59	—	51	21	—

=== Major championships results timeline ===
Event		2011	2012	2013	2014	2015	2016	2017	2018	2019	2020	2021	2022	2023	2024	2025	2026
Olympic Games	Time trial	NH	—	Not held			5	Not held				10	Not held		8	Not held	
Olympic Games	Road race	NH	—	Not held			3	Not held				3	Not held		9	Not held	
World Championships	Time trial	32	15	13	15	—	—	18	9	17	—	—	—	—	—	—	4
World Championships	Road race	57	3	8	14	4	89	DNF	13	5	3	17	10	—	3	15	3
World Championships	Team relay	Did not exist								4	NH	3	2	—	3	—	1
World Championships	Team time trial	NH	8	13	—	4	—	—	—	Race no longer exists							
European Championships	Road race	Elite races did not exist					3	20	15	17	2	32	—	—	—	10	4
European Championships	Time trial	Elite races did not exist					7	17	6	—	—	—	—	—	—	—	4
European Championships	Team relay	Did not exist								1	—	3	NH	—	—	—	2
National Championships	Time trial	—	2	2	1	—	1	1	9	3	1	1	1	1	2	2	1
National Championships	Road race	9	13	DNF	6	2	2	1	12	11	1	1	19	1	1	1	1

Legend
—	Did not compete
DNF	Did not finish
DNE	Did not exist
NH	Not held
