= 2026 Strade Bianche Donne =

Bicycle race

2026 UCI Women's World Tour, race 5 of 26

Race details
- Dates: 7 March 2026
- Stages: 1
- Distance: 133 km (83 mi)
- Winning time: 3h 35' 42"

Results
	Winner	Elise Chabbey (SUI)	(FDJ United–Suez)
	Second	Katarzyna Niewiadoma-Phinney (POL)	(Canyon//SRAM Zondacrypto)
	Third	Franziska Koch (GER)	(FDJ United–Suez)

The 2026 Strade Bianche Donne was a road cycling one-day race that took place on 7 March 2026 in Tuscany, Italy. It was the 12th edition of the Strade Bianche Donne and the fifth event of the 2026 UCI Women's World Tour.

The race was won by Swiss rider Elise Chabbey of FDJ United–Suez for the first time, beating Katarzyna Niewiadoma-Phinney and Franziska Koch in a close finish in Siena.

== Route ==
The race started and finished in Siena, Italy. Taking place over 131 kilometres (81 mi), the course includes 31.7 km (19.7 mi) of 'strade bianche' gravel roads spread over eleven sectors. The course is 5 km (3.1 mi) shorter than the 2025 edition of the race, with two fewer gravel sectors. The race finished on the Piazza del Campo, after a steep climb up Via Santa Caterina with a maximum gradient of 16%.

== Teams ==
Twenty-one teams participated in the race, including thirteen UCI Women's WorldTeams, three UCI Women's ProTeams, and five UCI Women's Continental Teams.

UCI Women's WorldTeams

- AG Insurance–Soudal
- Canyon//SRAM Zondacrypto
- EF Education–Oatly
- FDJ United–Suez
- Fenix–Premier Tech
- Lidl–Trek
- Liv AlUla Jayco
- Movistar Team
- Team Picnic–PostNL
- Team SD Worx–Protime
- UAE Team ADQ
- Uno-X Mobility
- Visma–Lease a Bike

UCI Women's ProTeams

- Ma Petite Entreprise
- St. Michel–Preference Home–Auber93
- VolkerWessels Women Cyclingteam

UCI Women's Continental Teams

- Aromitalia Vaiano
- Isolmant–Premac–Vittoria
- Team Mendelspeck E-Work
- Top Girls Fassa Bortolo
- Vini Fantini–BePink

== Result ==
Result
Rank	Rider	Team	Time
1	Elise Chabbey (SUI)	FDJ United–Suez	3h 35' 42"
2	Katarzyna Niewiadoma-Phinney (POL)	Canyon//SRAM Zondacrypto	+ 0"
3	Franziska Koch (GER)	FDJ United–Suez	+ 0"
4	Elisa Longo Borghini (ITA)	UAE Team ADQ	+ 3"
5	Magdeleine Vallieres (CAN)	EF Education–Oatly	+ 6"
6	Puck Pieterse (NED)	Fenix–Premier Tech	+ 16"
7	Marianne Vos (NED)	Visma–Lease a Bike	+ 34"
8	Monica Trinca Colonel (ITA)	Liv AlUla Jayco	+ 37"
9	Shirin van Anrooij (NED)	Lidl–Trek	+ 1' 21"
10	Niamh Fisher-Black (NZL)	Lidl–Trek	+ 1' 47"
