= 2025 Dwars door Vlaanderen for Women =

Cycling race

2025 UCI Women's ProSeries
- Event poster with previous winners Matteo Jorgenson and Marianne Vos

Race details
- Dates: 2 April 2025
- Stages: 1
- Distance: 128.5 km (79.8 mi)
- Winning time: 3h 12' 49"

Results
	Winner	Elisa Longo Borghini (ITA)	(UAE Team ADQ)
	Second	Lotte Kopecky (BEL)	(Team SD Worx–Protime)
	Third	Elisa Balsamo (ITA)	(Lidl–Trek)

The 2025 Dwars door Vlaanderen for Women was a road cycling one-day race that took place on 2 April 2025 in Belgium. It was the 13th edition of the women's race of Dwars door Vlaanderen. The race was won by Italian Elisa Longo Borghini, who rode solo for the final 30 kilometres (19 mi) to take her 50th career victory.

== Teams ==
Thirteen UCI Women's WorldTeams, five UCI Women's ProTeams, and six UCI Women's Continental Teams took part in the race.

UCI Women's WorldTeams

- AG Insurance–Soudal
- Canyon//SRAM zondacrypto
- FDJ–Suez
- Fenix–Deceuninck
- Human Powered Health
- Lidl–Trek
- Liv AlUla Jayco
- Movistar Team
- Team Picnic–PostNL
- Team SD Worx–Protime
- UAE Team ADQ
- Uno-X Mobility
- Visma–Lease a Bike

UCI Women's ProTeams

- Arkéa–B&B Hotels Women
- Cofidis
- St. Michel–Preference Home–Auber93
- Winspace Orange Seal

UCI Women's Continental Teams

- BePink–Imatra–Bongioanni
- DD Group Pro Cycling Team
- DAS–Hutchinson
- Lotto Ladies
- Team Coop–Repsol
- Hess Cycling Team

== Result ==
Result
Rank	Rider	Team	Time
1	Elisa Longo Borghini (ITA)	UAE Team ADQ	03h 12' 49"
2	Lotte Kopecky (BEL)	Team SD Worx–Protime	+ 29"
3	Elisa Balsamo (ITA)	Lidl–Trek	+ 29"
4	Puck Pieterse (NED)	Fenix–Deceuninck	+ 29"
5	Mischa Bredewold (NED)	Team SD Worx–Protime	+ 29"
6	Liane Lippert (GER)	Movistar Team	+ 29"
7	Vittoria Guazzini (ITA)	FDJ–Suez	+ 29"
8	Maria Giulia Confalonieri (ITA)	Uno-X Mobility	+ 29"
9	Elise Chabbey (SUI)	FDJ–Suez	+ 29"
10	Marte Berg Edseth (NOR)	Uno-X Mobility	+ 29"
