= 2019 Emakumeen Euskal Bira =

2019 UCI Women's World Tour, race 12 of 23

Race details
- Dates: 22 – 25 May 2018
- Stages: 4
- Winning time: 12h 21' 41"

Results
Jersey awarded to the overall winner	Winner	Elisa Longo Borghini (ITA)
	Second	Amanda Spratt (AUS)
	Third	Soraya Paladin (ITA)
Jersey awarded to the points classification winner	Points	Elisa Longo Borghini (ITA)
Jersey awarded to the mountains classification winner	Mountains	Elisa Longo Borghini (ITA)
Jersey awarded to the youth classification winner	Youth	Evita Muzic (FRA)

The 32nd running of the Emakumeen Euskal Bira was held from 22 to 25 May 2019. Raced over four stages in the Basque Country, it was one of two women's cycling events at World Tour level in Spain, together with La Madrid Challenge. It was the 12th event of the 2019 UCI Women's World Tour.

== Schedule ==
List of stages
Stage	Date	Course	Distance	Type	Winner
1	22 May	Iurreta to Iurreta	101 km (62.8 mi)	Flat stage	Jolien D'Hoore (BEL)
2	23 May	Aduna to Villabona-Amasa	111 km (69.0 mi)	Hilly stage	Amanda Spratt (AUS)
3	24 May	Murgia to Santa Teodosia	97 km (60.3 mi)	Intermediate stage	Tayler Wiles (USA)
4	25 May	Oñati to Oñati	156 km (96.9 mi)	Hilly stage	Elisa Longo Borghini (ITA)
Total			465 km (288.9 mi)		

== Teams ==
Twenty teams, each with a maximum of six riders, will start the race:

Professional women's teams

- Boels–Dolmans
- Canyon//SRAM
- Mitchelton–Scott
- Trek–Segafredo
- FDJ Nouvelle-Aquitaine Futuroscope
- Bigla Pro Cycling
- Alé–Cipollini
- Team Virtu Cycling
- WNT–Rotor Pro Cycling
- Bepink
- Valcar–Cylance
- Movistar Team
- BTC City Ljubljana
- Biehler Pro Cycling
- Bizkaia–Durango
- Eneicat
- Health Mate–Cyclelive Team
- Massi–Tactic
- Servetto–Piumate–Beltrami TSA
- Sopela Women's Team

== Leadership classification ==
Stage	Winner	General classification	Points classification	Mountains classification	Sprints classification	Young rider classification	Basque rider classification	Team classification
1	Jolien D'Hoore	Jolien D'Hoore	Jolien D'Hoore	Elisa Longo Borghini	Tanja Erath	Sandra Alonso Dominguez	Ane Santesteban	Mitchelton-Scott
2	Amanda Spratt	Amanda Spratt	Amanda Spratt	Elisa Longo Borghini	Tanja Erath	Sofia Bertizzolo	Ane Santesteban	Mitchelton-Scott
3	Tayler Wiles	Amanda Spratt	Amanda Spratt	Elisa Longo Borghini	Tanja Erath	Evita Muzic	Ane Santesteban	
4	Elisa Longo Borghini	Elisa Longo Borghini	Elisa Longo Borghini	Elisa Longo Borghini	Tanja Erath	Evita Muzic	Ane Santesteban	Movistar
Final classification		Elisa Longo Borghini	Elisa Longo Borghini	Elisa Longo Borghini	Tanja Erath	Evita Muzic	Ane Santesteban	Movistar

== See also ==
- 2019 in women's road cycling
