= Elise Chabbey =

Swiss cyclist and canoeist

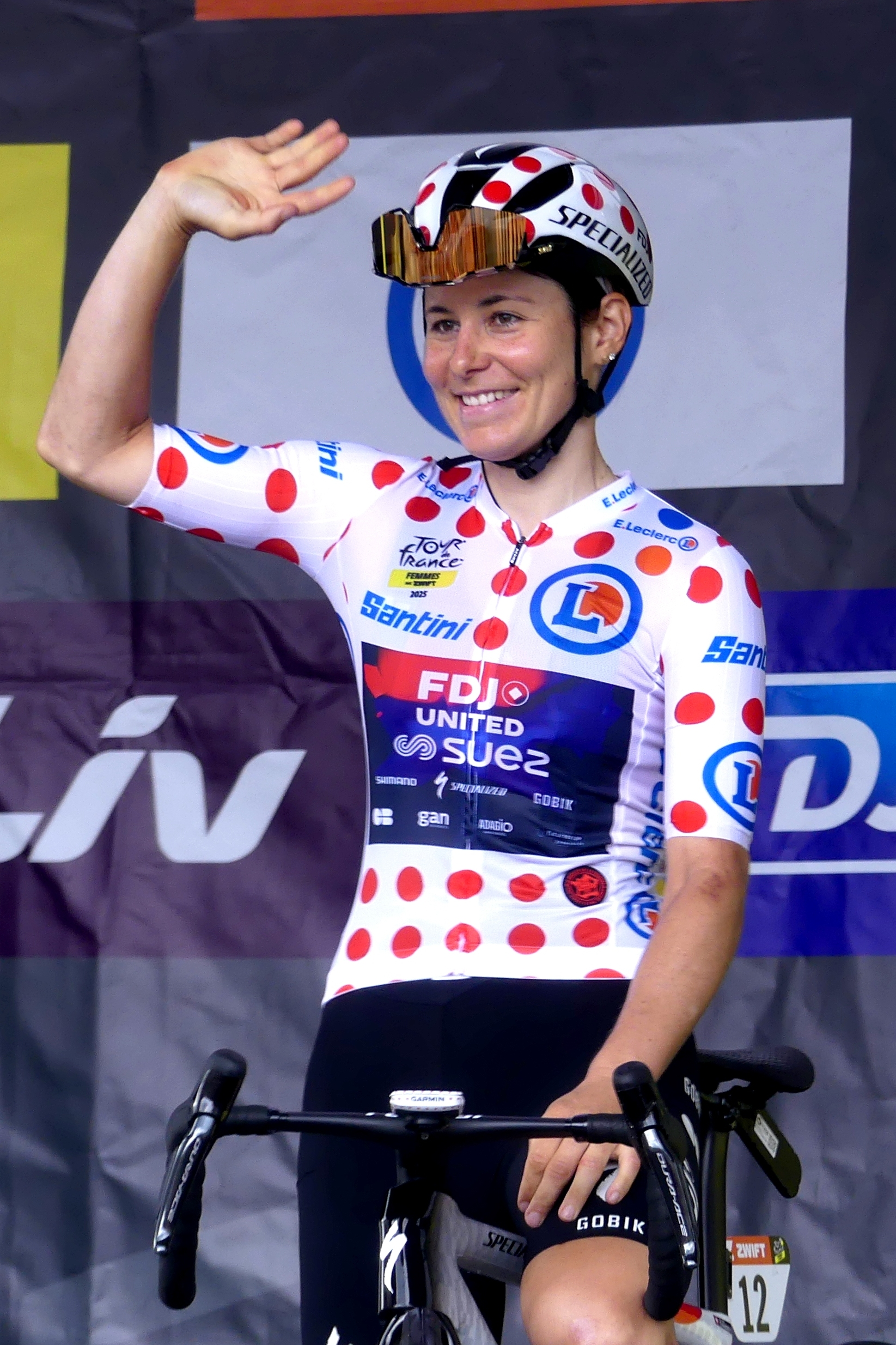
- Chabbey at the 2025 Tour de France Femmes

Personal information
- Full name: Elise Chabbey
- Born: 24 April 1993 (age 33) Geneva, Switzerland

Cycling career
- Sport: Cycling
- Current team: FDJ United–Suez
- Discipline: Road
- Role: Rider
- Rider type: All-rounder

Professional teams
- 2018: Cogeas
- 2019–2020: Bigla Pro Cycling
- 2021–2024: Canyon//SRAM
- 2025–: FDJ–Suez

Major wins
- Major Tours Tour de France Mountains classification (2025) Stage races Tour de Romandie (2025) One-day races and Classics National Road Race Championships (2020) Strade Bianche (2026)
Medal record
Women's road bicycle racing
Representing Switzerland
World Championships
Gold medal – first place	2022 Wollongong	Mixed team relay
Gold medal – first place	2023 Glasgow	Mixed team relay

Elise Chabbey (born 24 April 1993) is a Swiss road racing cyclist, who currently rides for UCI Women's WorldTeam FDJ United–Suez. She won the mixed team relay alongside her Swiss teammates at the UCI Road World Championships in 2022 and 2023. In 2025, Chabbey won the polka-dot jersey of the Queen of the Mountains classification at the Tour de France Femmes. In March 2026, she won the Strade Bianche Donne.

== Career ==
At the 2012 Summer Olympics she competed as a slalom canoer in the K-1 event, finishing 20th in the heats, failing to qualify for the semifinals. Retiring from canoe slalom, she entered medical school in 2014, starting to cycle after an injury prevented her from running.

Chabbey started her professional cycling career in 2018, joining the Cogeas team. In 2019, she joined Bigla Pro Cycling. During the COVID-19 pandemic in 2020, Chabbey worked full-time for three months at the University Hospital of Geneva – having completed her medical degree in October 2019. Later in 2020, Chabbey won the road race at the Swiss National Road Race Championships. For the 2021 season, Chabbey joined the Canyon//SRAM team on a two-year contract, following the disbandment of Équipe Paule Ka. At the 2021 Tour de Suisse Women, she finished 2nd overall, beaten by Lizzie Deignan by just 1 second.

In 2022, she and her Swiss teammates won gold in the mixed team relay at the 2022 UCI Road World Championships in Wollongong, New South Wales, Australia. In 2023, she and her Swiss teammates defended their mixed team relay title at the 2023 UCI Road World Championships in Scotland.

In 2025, Chabbey joined the French team FDJ-Suez. At the 2025 Tour de France Femmes, Chabbey won the polka-dot jersey of the Queen of the Mountains classification, leading the competition from start to finish. In August, she won the Tour de Romandie Féminin, the first stage race victory of her career.

In March 2026, Chabbey won Strade Bianche Donne in a sprint finish. In July 2026, Chabbey announced that she was pregnant and would miss the remainder of the season.

== Major results ==
2017
5th Road race, National Road Championships
2019
National Road Championships

2nd Road race
3rd Time trial

5th Overall Tour of Scotland
2020
National Road Championships

1st Road race
2nd Time trial

2nd Team relay, UEC European Road Championships
2021
2nd Overall Tour de Suisse

1st Stage 1

2nd Road race, National Road Championships
3rd Overall Challenge by La Vuelta
4th Ronde van Drenthe
7th Durango-Durango Emakumeen Saria
9th Overall The Women's Tour

1st Mountains classification

9th GP Oetingen
10th Overall Giro Rosa
2022
UCI Road World Championships

1st Team relay
9th Road race

3rd Dwars door Vlaanderen
4th Paris–Roubaix
5th Road race, National Road Championships
6th Strade Bianche
6th Overall The Women's Tour
6th Mont Ventoux Dénivelé Challenge
6th Classic Lorient Agglomération
7th Overall Setmana Ciclista Valenciana
7th Trofeo Alfredo Binda
7th Durango-Durango Emakumeen Saria
8th Overall Challenge by La Vuelta
8th Overall Kreiz Breizh Elites
2023
UCI Road World Championships

1st Team relay
7th Road race

3rd Road race, National Road Championships
4th Brabantse Pijl
5th Overall Tour de Suisse

1st Mountains classification

5th Overall UAE Tour
5th Liège–Bastogne–Liège
6th Road race, UEC European Road Championships
9th La Flèche Wallonne
10th Classic Lorient Agglomération
2024
1st Mountains classification, Tour de Suisse
4th Liège–Bastogne–Liège
4th Overall Vueltta a Burgos
5th Overall Itzulia Women
5th Road race, National Road Championships
7th Overall Setmana Ciclista Valenciana
8th Strade Bianche
2025
1st Overall Tour de Romandie

1st Stage 2

1st Mountains classification, Tour de France
2nd Grand Prix du Morbihan
4th Road race, UCI Road World Championships
5th Overall Tour Down Under
7th Tour of Flanders
7th Paris–Roubaix
9th Dwars door Vlaanderen
2026
1st Strade Bianche
7th Liège–Bastogne–Liège
