= Évita Muzic =

French cyclist

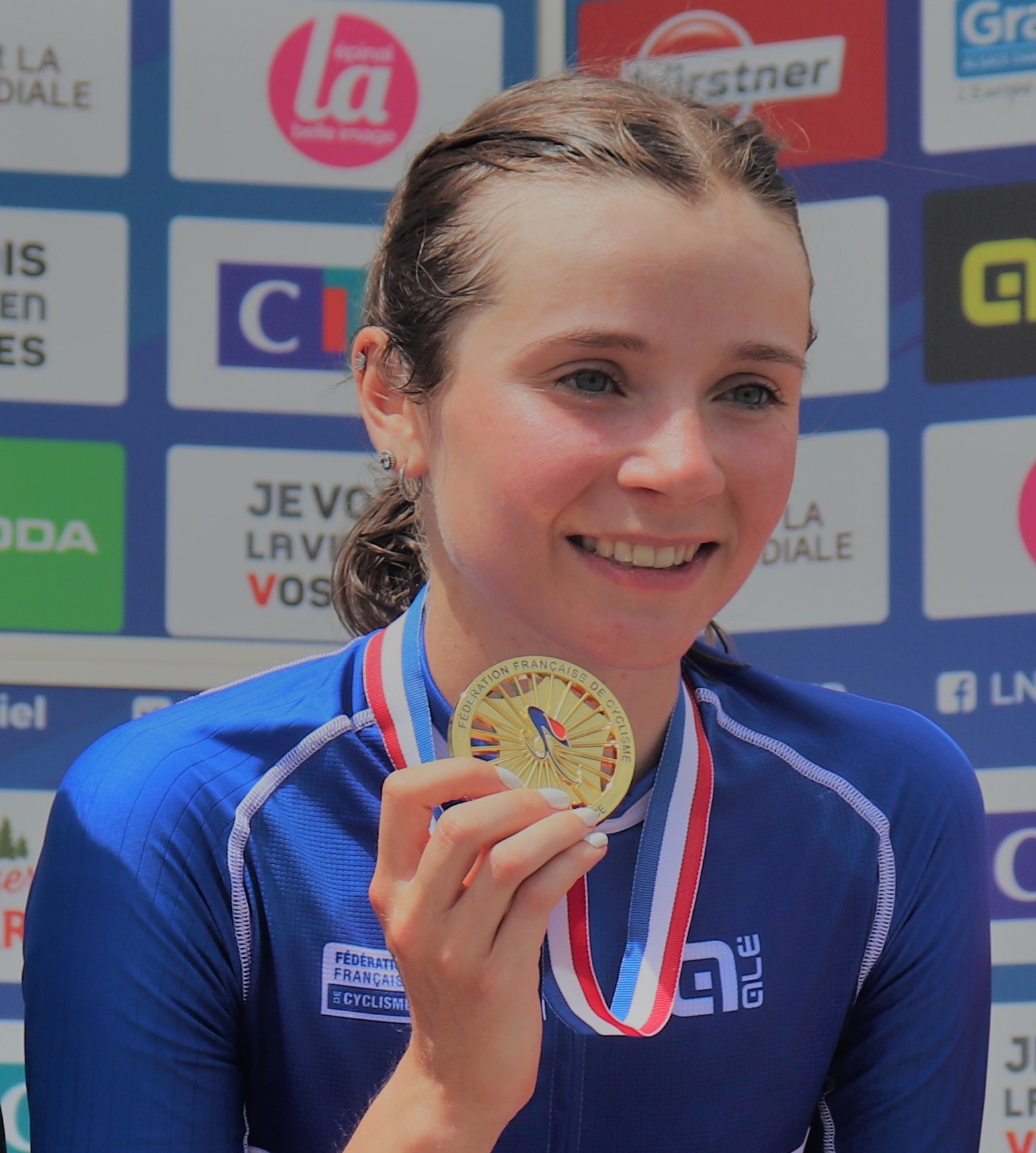
- Muzic in 2021

Personal information
- Full name: Évita Muzic
- Born: 26 May 1999 (age 27) Lons-le-Saunier, France

Cycling career
- Sport: Cycling
- Current team: FDJ United–Suez
- Disciplines: Road; Cyclo-cross
- Role: Rider

Amateur teams
- 2007–2010: Guidon Bletteranois FC
- 2011–2015: AS Bisontine
- 2016: VCC Morteau-Montbenoît

Professional team
- 2018–: FDJ Nouvelle-Aquitaine Futuroscope

Major wins
- Major Tours Giro d'Italia 1 individual stage (2020) La Vuelta Femenina 1 individual stage (2024) One-day races and Classics National Road Race Championships (2021)
Medal record
Representing France
European Championships
Bronze medal – third place	2021 Trentino	Under-23 road race

Évita Muzic (born 26 May 1999) is a French professional racing cyclist, who currently rides for UCI Women's WorldTeam FDJ United–Suez. She won the 2021 French National Road Race Championships.

== Major results ==
2019
National Under-23 Road Championships

1st Road race
3rd Time trial

1st Young rider classification Emakumeen Euskal Bira
1st Young rider classification, Tour Cycliste Féminin International de l'Ardèche
3rd La Périgord Ladies
2020
1st Stage 9 Giro Rosa
2021
1st Road race, National Road Championships
3rd Road race, UEC European Under-23 Road Championships
5th GP de Plouay
5th Donostia San Sebastián Klasikoa
2022
1st Alpes Gresivaudan Classic
2nd Overall Vuelta a Burgos

1st Young rider classification

3rd Mont Ventoux Dénivelé Challenge
6th Overall Tour de Romandie
8th Overall Tour de France
9th Grand Prix de Chambéry
2023
1st Alpes Gresivaudan Classic
3rd Grand Prix de Chambéry
5th Road race, National Road Championships
5th Overall Tour Cycliste Féminin International de l'Ardèche
5th La Flèche Wallonne
6th Overall La Vuelta Femenina
6th Overall Itzulia Women
8th Giro dell'Emilia
2024
2nd Overall Vuelta a Burgos
2nd Durango-Durango Emakumeen Saria
2nd Grand Prix de Chambéry
2nd Alpes Grésivaudan Classic
4th Overall Tour de France
4th La Flèche Wallonne
4th Road race, National Road Championships
5th Overall La Vuelta Femenina

1st Stage 6

9th Trofeo Alfredo Binda
10th Strade Bianche
2025
10th Overall Tour de France
2026
2nd Overall Vuelta a Burgos Feminas
6th Overall Itzulia Women
10th Overall La Vuelta Femenina
