= Mikayla Harvey =

New Zealand cyclist (born 1998)

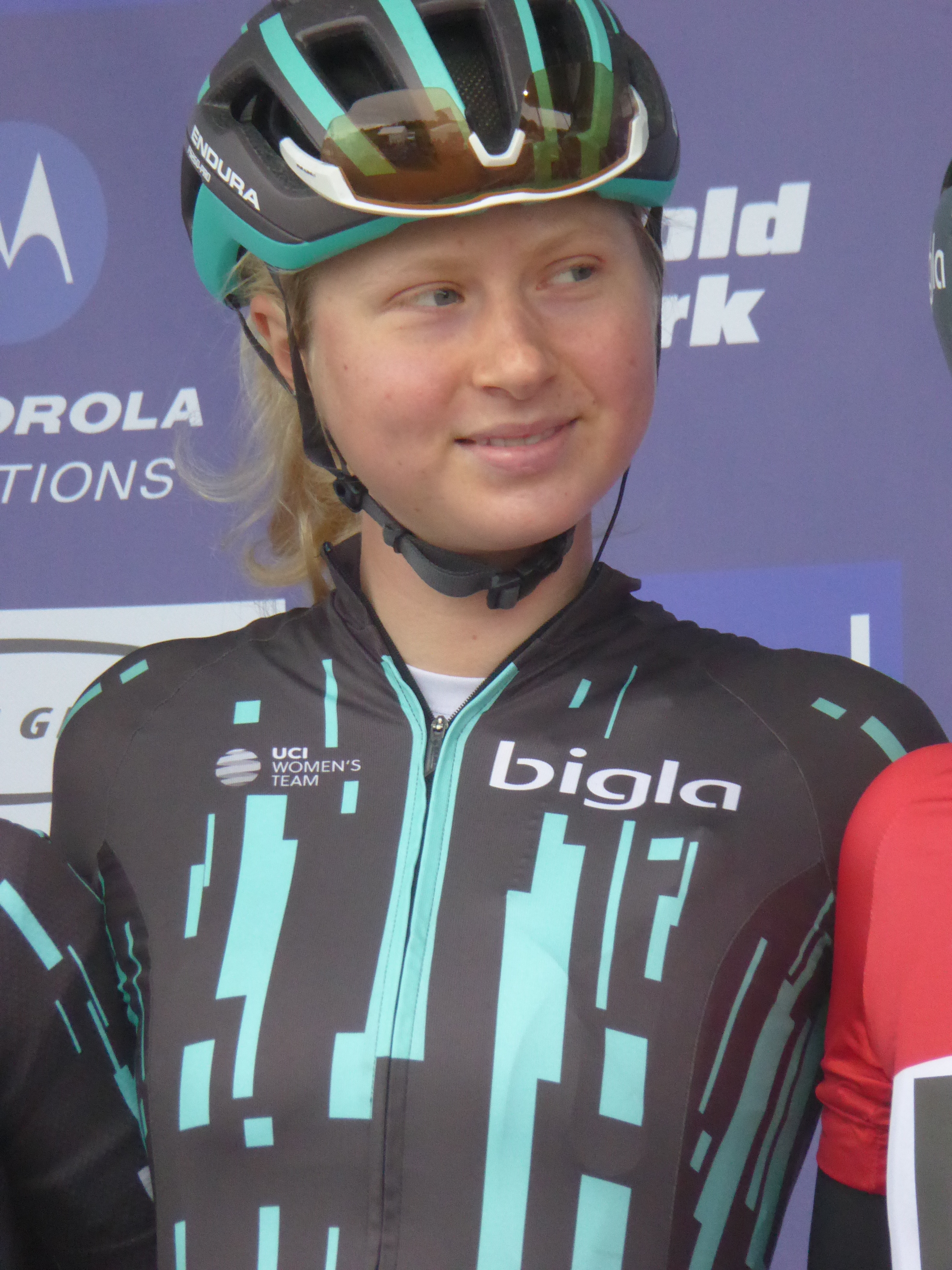
- Harvey at the 2019 Women's Tour of Scotland

Personal information
- Full name: Mikayla Harvey
- Nickname: Maca
- Born: 7 September 1998 (age 28) Howick, New Zealand
- Height: 1.71 m (5 ft 7 in)

Cycling career
- Sport: Cycling
- Current team: Team SD Worx–Protime
- Discipline: Road
- Role: Rider

Amateur team
- 2017: Mike Greer Homes

Professional teams
- 2017–2018: Team Illuminate
- 2019–2020: Bigla Pro Cycling
- 2021–2022: Canyon//SRAM
- 2023–2024: UAE Team ADQ
- 2025–: Team SD Worx–Protime

Mikayla Harvey (born 7 September 1998) is a New Zealand road racing cyclist, who rides for UCI Women's WorldTeam Team SD Worx–Protime. During her career, Harvey has taken one professional victory – the third stage individual time trial at the 2019 Tour de Bretagne Féminin – and won the young rider classification at the 2020 Giro Rosa.

== Career ==
Harvey joined Bigla Pro Cycling at the start of the 2019 season, having rode for Team Illuminate for the previous two seasons. She took her first professional victory when she won the third stage of that year's Tour de Bretagne Féminin, an individual time trial. She finished fifth overall and won the white jersey for best young rider at the 2020 Giro Rosa.

In December 2020, Harvey signed a two-year contract with Canyon//SRAM, from the 2021 season. Her best placing over her two seasons with the team was fifth-place finishes at both the Gran Premio Ciudad de Eibar, and the Tour de Suisse Women – also winning the young rider classification in Switzerland. She joined UAE Team ADQ for the 2023 season, recording a sixth-place finish at the 2023 UAE Tour Women and a second-place finish at the 2024 New Zealand National Time Trial Championships.

Harvey signed with Team SD Worx–Protime for the 2025 season, signing a two-year contract.

== Major results ==
2015
1st Road race, National Junior Road Championships
2016
Oceania Junior Road Championships

1st Time trial
2nd Road race

2017
1st Time trial, National Under-23 Road Championships
Oceania Road Cycling Championships

2nd Under-23 time trial
9th Road race

2018
Oceania Road Cycling Championships

1st Under-23 road race
1st Under-23 time trial
3rd Road race

2nd Time trial, National Under-23 Road Championships
9th Overall Panorama Guizhou International Women's Road Cycling Race
2019
1st Stage 3 (ITT) Tour de Bretagne Féminin
4th Time trial, National Under-23 Road Championships
2020
2nd Time trial, National Under-23 Road Championships
5th Overall Giro d'Italia Femminile

1st Young rider classification

7th La Flèche Wallonne Femmes
2021
5th Overall Tour de Suisse Women

1st Young rider classification

5th Gran Premio Ciudad de Eibar
6th Emakumeen Nafarroako Klasikoa
2022
9th Overall Grand Prix Elsy Jacobs
10th Overall The Women's Tour
2023
6th Overall UAE Tour Women
2024
2nd Time trial, National Road Championships
4th Road race, National Road Championships
2026
2nd New Zealand National Road Race Championships
2nd New Zealand National Time Trial Championships
