= 2026 UCI Women's ProSeries =

- Seventh edition of the UCI Women's ProSeries

Details
- Dates: 21 January – 6 October 2026
- Location: Europe; Australia
- Races: 19

The 2026 UCI Women's ProSeries is the seventh season of the second-tier UCI Women's ProSeries road cycling tour, a competition with nineteen road cycling events throughout the 2026 women's cycling season. The tour sits below the UCI Women's World Tour but above the UCI Class 1 and Class 2 races. The competition began with the Women's Down Under Classic on 21 January, and will finish with the Tre Valli Varesine on 6 October.

== Events ==
20 races were originally part of the 2026 season, 17 one-day races (1.Pro) and 3 stage races (2.Pro). Of these 20 events, two races were to be held outside Europe, with two one-day races in Australia at the start of the season.

In January 2026, the Surf Coast Classic was cancelled a day before the event, owing to a high risk of bushfires in the local area.

Races in the 2026 UCI Women's ProSeries
Race	Date	Winner	Team	Ref.
(Australia) Women's Tour Down Under One Day Race	21 January	Maggie Coles-Lyster (CAN)	Human Powered Health	
(Australia) Surf Coast Classic	28 January	Cancelled		
(Spain) Vuelta CV Feminas	8 February	Liane Lippert (GER)	Movistar Team	
(Spain) Setmana Ciclista Valenciana	12–15 February	Demi Vollering (NED)	FDJ United–Suez	
(Spain) Clasica de Almeria	22 February	Federica Venturelli (ITA)	UAE Team ADQ	
(Belgium) Ixina GP Oetingen	11 March	Lorena Wiebes (NED)	Team SD Worx–Protime	
(Belgium) Nokere Koerse	18 March	Lotte Kopecky (BEL)	Team SD Worx–Protime	
(Belgium) Scheldeprijs	8 April	Charlotte Kool (NED)	Fenix–Premier Tech	
(Belgium) Brabantse Pijl	17 April	Célia Gery (FRA)	FDJ United–Suez	
(Spain) Clasica Femenina Navarra	13 May	Cat Ferguson (GBR)	Movistar Team	
(Belgium) Antwerp Port Epic Ladies	24 May	Femke Markus (NED)	Team SD Worx–Protime	
Tour of Norway Women	30 May–1 June	Cancelled		
(France) Tour Féminin International des Pyrénées	12–14 June	Paula Blasi (ESP)	UAE Team ADQ	
(Germany) Thüringen Women Cycling Challenge	21 June	Marit Raaijmakers (NED)	Human Powered Health	
(Poland) Tour de Pologne Women	24–26 July	Lorena Wiebes (NED)	Team SD Worx–Protime	
(Belgium) GP Lucien Van Impe	20 August	Charlotte Kool (NED)	Fenix–Premier Tech	
(France) Pointe du Raz Ladies Classic	6 September	Nina Berton (LUX)	EF Education–Oatly	
(France) La Choralis Fourmies Féminine	13 September	Lorena Wiebes (NED)	Team SD Worx–Protime	
(Germany) Women's Cycling Grand Prix Stuttgart & Region	13 September	Dominika Włodarczyk (POL)	UAE Team L'Imad	
(Italy) Giro dell'Emilia Internazionale Donne Elite	3 October	Alessia Vigilia (ITA)	Uno-X Mobility	
(Italy) Tre Valli Varesine	6 October	Eleonora Gasparrini (ITA)	UAE Team L'Imad	
