= 2025 UCI Women's ProSeries =

- Sixth edition of the UCI Women's ProSeries

Details
- Dates: 26 January – 7 October 2025
- Location: Europe; Australia
- Races: 14

The 2025 UCI Women's ProSeries was the sixth season of the second-tier UCI Women's ProSeries road cycling tour, a competition with fourteen road cycling events throughout the 2025 women's cycling season. The tour sits below the UCI Women's World Tour but above the UCI Class 1 and Class 2 races. The competition began with the Women's Down Under Classic on 26 January, and finished with the Tre Valli Varesine on 7 October.

== Events ==
The 2025 season consisted of 14 races, of which 13 were one-day races (1.Pro) and 1 was a stage race (2.Pro). Of these 14 events, the only non-European event was the season-opening Women's Down Under Classic one-day race in Australia.

In January 2025, it was announced that Veenendaal–Veenendaal (which would have been held on 23 May) had been cancelled owing to a lack of available police, because of the NATO summit at The Hague. In March 2025, organisers of Thüringen Ladies Tour announced that the 2025 edition had been cancelled after funding from the Thuringia state government was stopped.

Races in the 2025 UCI Women's ProSeries
Race	Date	Winner	Team	Ref.
(Australia) Women's Down Under Classic	26 January	Clara Copponi (FRA)	Lidl–Trek	
(Spain) Vuelta CV Feminas	9 February	Linda Zanetti (SUI)	Uno-X Mobility	
(Spain) Setmana Ciclista Valenciana	13–16 February	Demi Vollering (NED)	FDJ–Suez	
(Belgium) Ixina GP Oetingen	12 March	Julie De Wilde (BEL)	Fenix–Deceuninck	
(Belgium) Nokere Koerse	19 March	Marta Lach (POL)	Team SD Worx–Protime	
(Belgium) Dwars door Vlaanderen	2 April	Elisa Longo Borghini (ITA)	UAE Team ADQ	
(Belgium) Brabantse Pijl	18 April	Elisa Longo Borghini (ITA)	UAE Team ADQ	
(Spain) Clasica Femenina Navarra	14 May	Cat Ferguson (GBR)	Movistar Team	
(Netherlands) Veenendaal–Veenendaal	23 May	Cancelled		
(Belgium) Antwerp Port Epic Ladies	7 June	Susanne Andersen (NOR)	Uno-X Mobility	
(Germany) Thüringen Ladies Tour	17–22 June	Cancelled		
(France) La Choralis Fourmies Féminine	14 September	Lorena Wiebes (NED)	Team SD Worx–Protime	
(Germany) Women's Cycling Grand Prix Stuttgart & Region	14 September	Eleonora Gasparrini (ITA)	UAE Team ADQ	
(Italy) Giro dell'Emilia Internazionale Donne Elite	4 October	Kimberley Le Court (MRI)	AG Insurance–Soudal	
(Spain) Gran Premio Ciudad de Eibar	5 October	Debora Silvestri (ITA)	Laboral Kutxa–Fundación Euskadi	
(Italy) Tre Valli Varesine	7 October	Elisa Longo Borghini (ITA)	UAE Team ADQ	
