= 2024 UCI Women's ProSeries =

- Fifth edition of the UCI Women's ProSeries

Details
- Dates: 13 February – 8 October 2024
- Location: Europe
- Races: 10

The 2024 UCI Women's ProSeries was the fifth season of the second-tier UCI Women's ProSeries road cycling tour, a competition with ten road cycling events throughout the 2024 women's cycling season. The tour sits below the UCI Women's World Tour but above the UCI Class 1 and Class 2 races. The competition began with the Setmana Ciclista Valenciana in February, and finished with the Tre Valli Varesine on 8 October.

== Events ==
The 2024 season consisted of 10 races, of which 8 are one-day races (1.Pro) and 2 are stage races (2.Pro). All races were held in Europe.

Races in the 2024 UCI Women's ProSeries
Race	Date	Winner	Team	Ref.
(Spain) Vuelta a Mallorca	30 January–1 February	Cancelled		
(Spain) Setmana Ciclista Valenciana	13–16 February	Marlen Reusser (SUI)	Team SD Worx–Protime	
(Belgium) Nokere Koerse	13 March	Lotte Kopecky (BEL)	Team SD Worx–Protime	
(Belgium) Dwars door Vlaanderen	27 March	Marianne Vos (NED)	Visma–Lease a Bike	
(Belgium) Brabantse Pijl	10 April	Elisa Longo Borghini (ITA)	Lidl–Trek	
(Spain) Clasica Femenina Navarra	15 May	Hannah Ludwig (GER)	Cofidis	
(Spain) Gran Premio Ciudad de Eibar	26 May	Yurani Blanco (ESP)	Laboral Kutxa–Fundación Euskadi	
(Germany) Thüringen Ladies Tour	25–30 June	Ruth Edwards (USA)	Human Powered Health	
(Germany) Women's Cycling Grand Prix Stuttgart & Region	15 September	Eleonora Gasparrini (ITA)	UAE Team ADQ	
(Italy) Giro dell'Emilia Internazionale Donne Elite	5 October	Elisa Longo Borghini (ITA)	Lidl–Trek	
(Italy) Tre Valli Varesine	8 October	Cédrine Kerbaol (FRA)	Ceratizit–WNT Pro Cycling	
