= 2023 UCI Women's ProSeries =

- Fourth edition of the UCI Women's ProSeries

Details
- Dates: 16 February – 30 September 2023
- Location: Europe
- Races: 8

The 2023 UCI Women's ProSeries was the fourth season of the second-tier UCI Women's ProSeries road cycling tour, a competition with eight road cycling events throughout the 2023 women's cycling season. The tour sits below the UCI Women's World Tour but above the UCI Class 1 and Class 2 races. The competition began with the Setmana Ciclista-Volta Comunitat Valenciana Fèmines in February, and finished with the Giro dell'Emilia Internazionale Donne Elite in September.

== Events ==
The 2023 season consisted of 8 races, of which 5 are one-day races (1.Pro) and 3 are stage races (2.Pro). All races were held in Europe. The Omloop Het Nieuwsblad and Tour de Suisse races moved to the UCI Women's World Tour, with two Spanish races joining the calendar.

Races in the 2023 UCI Women's ProSeries
Race	Date	Winner	Team	Ref.
(Spain) Setmana Ciclista-Volta Comunitat Valenciana Fèmines	16–19 February	Justine Ghekiere (BEL)	AG Insurance–Soudal–Quick-Step	
(Belgium) Nokere Koerse	15 March	Lotte Kopecky (BEL)	SD Worx	
(Belgium) Dwars door Vlaanderen	29 March	Demi Vollering (NED)	SD Worx	
(Belgium) Brabantse Pijl	12 April	Silvia Persico (ITA)	UAE Team ADQ	
(Luxembourg) Grand Prix Elsy Jacobs	29–30 April	Ally Wollaston (NZL)	AG Insurance–Soudal–Quick-Step	
(Spain) Clasica Femenina Navarra	10 May	Riejanne Markus (NED)	Team Jumbo–Visma	
(Germany) Thüringen Ladies Tour	23–28 June	Lotte Kopecky (BEL)	SD Worx	
(Italy) Giro dell'Emilia Internazionale Donne Elite	30 September	Cecilie Uttrup Ludwig (DEN)	FDJ–Suez	
