= UCI Women's ProSeries =

Women's elite road cycling tour

- Current season, competition or edition: 2026 UCI Women's ProSeries
- Sport: Road bicycle racing
- Founded: 2020
- Country: Europe and Australia

The UCI ProSeries is the second tier women's elite road cycling tour. It was inaugurated in 2020. The series is placed below the UCI Women's World Tour, but above the various 1.1/2.1 and 1.2/2.2 races. As of 2026, the tour consists of 20 races in Europe and Australia, of which 17 are one-day races (1.Pro) and 3 are stage races (2.Pro).

== History ==
In January 2019, the Union Cycliste Internationale (UCI) announced that from 2020, a second tier of professional cycle races would be held below the existing UCI World Tour and UCI Women's World Tour races – the UCI ProSeries. Women's ProSeries races would have to "abide by improved organisational standards" including a level of television production.

In 2020, the inaugural UCI ProSeries calendar consisted of 8 events, of which only 2 ran due to the COVID-19 pandemic. In 2021, the number of events expanded, but again the COVID-19 pandemic led to multiple cancellations, with only 6 events running. Some races (such as Omloop Het Nieuwsblad, Dwars door Vlaanderen and Women's Tour Down Under) have subsequently moved to the UCI Women's World Tour.

In 2021, the Giro d'Italia Women was run as a UCI ProSeries event due to the lack of live television coverage during the 2020 edition of the race. The Giro returned to the UCI Women's World Tour in 2022.

In 2026, the calendar grew substantially, gaining 7 new events including two additional stage races.

== Events ==
Current events (as of the 2026 season)
One day events	Stage races
Women's Tour Down Under One Day Race	Setmana Ciclista Valenciana
Surf Coast Classic	Tour Féminin International des Pyrénées
Vuelta CV Feminas	Tour de Pologne Women
Clasica de Almeria	
Ixina GP Oetingen	
Nokere Koerse	
Brabantse Pijl	
Scheldeprijs	
Clasica Femenina Navarra	
Antwerp Port Epic Ladies	
Women Cycling Day	
GP Lucien Van Impe	
Pointe du Raz Ladies Classic	
La Choralis Fourmies Féminine	
Women's Cycling Grand Prix Stuttgart & Region	
Giro dell'Emilia Internazionale Donne Elite	
Tre Valli Varesine	

== Winners by race ==
=== 2020–2025 ===
Year	2020	2021	2022	2023	2024	2025
(Australia) Women's Tour Down Under	(United States) Winder (1/2)	Cancelled		Part of UCI Women's World Tour
(Australia) Women's Tour Down Under One Day Race	Not part of UCI ProSeries					(France) Copponi
(Belgium) Omloop Het Nieuwsblad	Not part of UCI ProSeries	(Netherlands) van der Breggen (1/2)	(Netherlands) van Vleuten	Part of UCI Women's World Tour
(Spain) Setmana Ciclista Valenciana	Not part of UCI ProSeries					(Switzerland) Zanetti
(Spain) Vuelta CV Feminas	Not part of UCI ProSeries			(Belgium) Ghekiere	(Switzerland) Reusser	(Netherlands) Vollering (3/4)
(Belgium) GP Oetingen	Not part of UCI ProSeries					(Belgium) De Wilde
(Belgium) Nokere Koerse	Not part of UCI ProSeries	(Netherlands) Pieters	(Netherlands) Wiebes (1/5)	(Belgium) Kopecky (1/4)	(Belgium) Kopecky (3/4)	(Poland) Lach
(Belgium) Dwars door Vlaanderen	Not part of UCI ProSeries		(Italy) Consonni	(Netherlands) Vollering (2/4)	(Netherlands) Vos	(Italy) Longo Borghini (4/6)
(Belgium) Brabantse Pijl	Not part of UCI ProSeries		(Netherlands) Vollering (1/4)	(Italy) Persico	(Italy) Longo Borghini (2/6)	(Italy) Longo Borghini (5/6)
(Luxembourg) Festival Elsy Jacobs	Cancelled	(Denmark) Norsgaard	(Italy) Bastianelli	(New Zealand) Wollaston	Not part of UCI ProSeries
(Spain) Vuelta a Burgos Feminas	Cancelled		Part of UCI Women's World Tour
(Spain) Clasica Femenina Navarra	Not part of UCI ProSeries			(Netherlands) R Markus	(Germany) Ludwig	(United Kingdom) Ferguson (1/2)
(Italy) Gran Premio Ciudad de Eibar	Not part of UCI ProSeries				(Spain) Blanco	(Italy) Silvestri
(Belgium) Antwerp Port Epic	Not part of UCI ProSeries			Not part of UCI ProSeries		(Norway) Andersen
(Germany) Thüringen Rundfahrt der Frauen	Cancelled	(Netherlands) Brand (1/2)	(Australia) Manly	(Belgium) Kopecky (2/4)	(United States) Winder (2/2)	Cancelled
(Italy) Giro d'Italia Femminile	Not part of UCI ProSeries	(Netherlands) van der Breggen (2/2)	Part of UCI Women's World Tour
(Switzerland) Tour de Suisse Women	Not part of UCI ProSeries		(Netherlands) Brand (2/2)	Part of UCI Women's World Tour
(Spain) Donostia San Sebastian Emakumeen Klasikoa	Cancelled	Part of UCI Women's World Tour	Replaced by Itzulia Women
(United Kingdom) RideLondon Classique	Cancelled		Part of UCI Women's World Tour
(France) La Choralis Fourmies Féminine	Not part of UCI ProSeries	Cancelled	Not part of UCI ProSeries			(Netherlands) Wiebes (2/5)
(Germany) Women's Cycling Grand Prix Stuttgart & Region	Not Held			Not part of UCI ProSeries	(Italy) Gasparrini (1/2)	(Italy) Gasparrini (2/2)
(Italy) Giro dell'Emilia Internazionale Donne Elite	(Denmark) Uttrup Ludwig (1/2)	(Spain) García	(Italy) Longo Borghini (1/6)	(Denmark) Uttrup Ludwig (2/2)	(Italy) Longo Borghini (3/6)	(Mauritius) Le Court
(Italy) Tre Valli Varesine	Not part of UCI ProSeries				(France) Kerbaol	(Italy) Longo Borghini (6/6)
(Italy) Gran Premio Bruno Beghelli Internazionale Donne Elite	Cancelled			Not held

=== 2026– ===
Year	2026
(Australia) Women's Tour Down Under One Day Race	(Canada) Coles-Lyster
(Australia) Surf Coast Classic	Cancelled
(Spain) Vuelta CV Feminas	(Germany) Lippert
(Spain) Setmana Ciclista Valenciana	(Netherlands) Vollering (4/4)
(Spain) Clásica de Almería	(Italy) Venturelli
(Belgium) GP Oetingen	(Netherlands) Wiebes (3/5)
(Belgium) Nokere Koerse	(Belgium) Kopecky (4/4)
(Belgium) Scheldeprijs	(Netherlands) Kool (1/2)
(Belgium) Brabantse Pijl	(France) Gery
(Spain) Clasica Femenina Navarra	(United Kingdom) Ferguson (2/2)
(Belgium) Antwerp Port Epic Ladies	(Netherlands) F Markus
(France) Tour Féminin International des Pyrénées	(Spain) Blasi
(Germany) Women Cycling Day	(Netherlands) Raaijmakers
(Poland) Tour de Pologne Women	(Netherlands) Wiebes (4/5)
(Belgium) GP Lucien Van Impe	(Netherlands) Kool (2/2)
(France) Pointe du Raz Ladies Classic	(Luxembourg) Berton
(France) La Choralis Fourmies Féminine	(Netherlands) Wiebes (5/5)
(Germany) Women's Cycling Grand Prix Stuttgart & Region	(Poland) Włodarczyk
(Italy) Giro dell'Emilia Internazionale Donne Elite
(Italy) Tre Valli Varesine

=== Most race wins ===
Rank	Cyclist	Wins
1	(Italy) Elisa Longo Borghini	6
2	(Netherlands) Lorena Wiebes	5
3	(Belgium) Lotte Kopecky	4
3	(Netherlands) Demi Vollering	4
5	(Netherlands) Anna van der Breggen	2
5	(Netherlands) Lucinda Brand	2
5	(United Kingdom) Cat Ferguson	2
5	(Italy) Eleonora Gasparrini	2
5	(Denmark) Cecilie Uttrup Ludwig	2
5	(United States) Ruth Winder	2

Victories by team
Rank	Team	No of wins	Riders
1	Team SD Worx–Protime	15	Kopecky (4), Wiebes (4), van der Breggen (2), Vollering (2), Lach (1), F. Markus (1), Pieters (1)
2	UAE Team L'Imad	11	Longo Borghini (3), Gasparrini (2), Bastianelli (1), Blasi (1), García (1), Persico (1), Venturelli (1), Włodarczyk (1)
3	Lidl–Trek	7	Longo Borghini (3), Brand (2), Copponi (1), Winder (1)
4	Movistar Team	6	Ferguson (2), Lippert (1), Norsgaard (1), Reusser (1), van Vleuten (1)
5	FDJ United–Suez	5	Uttrup Ludwig (2), Vollering (2), Gery (1)
6	AG Insurance–Soudal	3	Le Court (1), Ghekiere (1), Wollaston (1)
6	Fenix–Premier Tech	3	De Wilde (1), Kool (1)
6	Human Powered Health	3	Coles-Lyster (1), Raaijmakers (1), Winder (1)
9	Laboral Kutxa–Fundación Euskadi	2	Blanco (1), Silvestri (1)
9	Uno-X Mobility	2	Andersen (1), Zanetti (1)
9	Visma–Lease a Bike	2	R Markus (1), Vos (1)
13	Ceratizit Pro Cycling	1	Kerbaol (1)
13	Cofidis	1	Ludwig (1)
13	EF Education–Oatly	1	Berton (1)
13	Liv AlUla Jayco	1	Manly (1)
13	Team Picnic–PostNL	1	Wiebes (1)
13	Valcar–Travel & Service	1	Consonni (1)

Victories by nation
Rank	Team	No of wins	Riders
1	Netherlands	21	Wiebes (5), Vollering (4), Brand (2), Kool (2), van der Breggen (2), F. Markus (1), R Markus (1), Pieters (1), Raaijmakers (1), van Vleuten (1), Vos (1)
2	Italy	13	Longo Borghini (6), Gasparrini (2), Bastianelli (1),Consonni (1), Persico (1), Silvestri (1), Venturelli (1)
3	Belgium	6	Kopecky (4), De Wilde (1), Ghekiere (1)
4	Denmark	3	Uttrup Ludwig (2), Norsgaard (1)
4	France	3	Copponi (1), Gery (1), Kerbaol (1)
4	Spain	3	Blanco (1), Blasi (1), García (1)
7	Germany	2	Lippert (1), Ludwig (1)
7	United Kingdom	2	Ferguson (2)
7	Poland	2	Lach (1), Włodarczyk (1)
7	Switzerland	2	Reusser (1), Zanetti (1)
7	United States	2	Winder (2)
12	Australia	1	Manly (1)
12	Canada	1	Coles-Lyster (1)
12	Luxembourg	1	Berton (1)
12	Mauritius	1	Le Court (1)
12	New Zealand	1	Wollaston (1)
12	Norway	1	Andersen (1)

== See also ==
- UCI race classifications
