= 2021 Giro Rosa =

Italian cycling race

2021 UCI Women's ProSeries, race 5 of 7
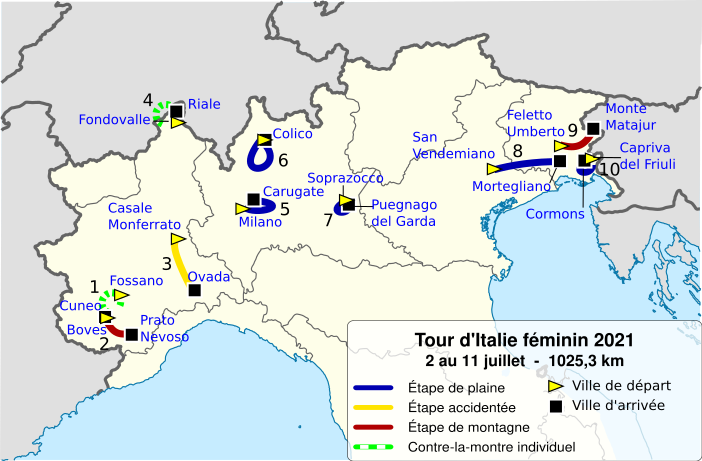

Race details
- Dates: 2–11 July 2021
- Stages: 10
- Distance: 1,022.7 km (635.5 mi)
- Winning time: 27h 00' 55"

Results
Jersey awarded to the overall winner	Winner	Anna van der Breggen (NED)	(SD Worx)
	Second	Ashleigh Moolman (RSA)	(SD Worx)
	Third	Demi Vollering (NED)	(SD Worx)
Jersey awarded to the points classification winner	Points	Anna van der Breggen (NED)	(SD Worx)
Jersey awarded to the mountains classification winner	Mountains	Lucinda Brand (NED)	(Trek–Segafredo)
Jersey awarded to the young rider classification winner	Young rider	Niamh Fisher-Black (NZL)	(SD Worx)
Jersey awarded to the team classification winner	Team	SD Worx	

The 2021 Giro d'Italia Donne (commonly known as the Giro Rosa) was the 32nd edition of the Giro d'Italia Femminile women's road cycling stage race. The race started on 2 July and finished on 9 July and, as the longest and one of the most prestigious races on the women's calendar, included ten stages covering over 1,000 kilometres (620 mi) across northern Italy.

After the COVID-19 pandemic pushed the 2020 edition back to September, the 2021 edition saw the Giro Rosa return to its usual July timeslot. Despite that, the UCI demoted the race from the UCI Women's World Tour after the 2020 season, with the move being attributed to race organizers failing to provide the minimum of 45 minutes of live television coverage required for all top-tier Women's WorldTour races. As a result, this edition will be the race's first as a UCI Women's ProSeries event. However, with the race under new management, race organizers sought to adhere to the UCI's requirements and return the race to the UCI Women's World Tour in 2022.

The race was won by defending champion Anna van der Breggen for the fourth time.

== Teams ==
All nine UCI Women's WorldTeams, along with fifteen UCI Women's Continental Teams, participated in the race. Each team began the race with a squad of six riders, for a total of 144 riders. Of these riders, 92 finished.

UCI Women's WorldTeams

- Alé BTC Ljubljana
- Canyon//SRAM
- FDJ Nouvelle-Aquitaine Futuroscope
- Liv Racing
- Movistar Team
- SD Worx
- Team BikeExchange
- Team DSM
- Trek–Segafredo

UCI Women's Continental Teams

- A.R. Monex
- Arkéa Pro Cycling Team
- Aromitalia–Basso Bikes–Vaiano
- Bepink
- Bizkaia–Durango
- Born to Win G20 Ambedo
- Ceratizit–WNT Pro Cycling
- Isolmant–Premac–Vittoria
- Lotto–Soudal Ladies
- Rally Cycling
- Servetto–Makhymo–Beltrami TSA
- Team Jumbo–Visma
- Tibco–Silicon Valley Bank
- Top Girls Fassa Bortolo
- Valcar–Travel & Service

== Route ==
After the 2020 edition was reduced to nine stages, the 2021 edition saw the Giro Rosa return to its usual ten-stage length. On 5 May 2021, race organizers revealed the host start and finish locations of each stage, with stage lengths and routes released during a press conference on 4 June. On 2 July, the race kicked off from Fossano, Piedmont, with a team time trial, which featured as the opening stage for the fifth consecutive edition since its implementation in 2017. The race then continued through Piedmont and travelled east through Liguria, Lombardy, and Veneto before finishing in Cormons, Friuli-Venezia Giulia, on 11 July.

Stage characteristics and winners
Stage	Date	Course	Distance	Type	Winner
1	2 July	Fossano to Cuneo	26.7 km (16.6 mi)	Team time trial	Trek–Segafredo
2	3 July	Boves to Prato Nevoso	100.1 km (62.2 mi)	Mountain stage	Anna van der Breggen (NED)
3	4 July	Casale Monferrato to Ovada	135 km (84 mi)	Hilly stage	Marianne Vos (NED)
4	5 July	Formazza (Fondovalle) to Riale di Formazza Cascata del Toce	11.2 km (7.0 mi)	Mountain time trial	Anna van der Breggen (NED)
5	6 July	Milan to Carugate	120.1 km (74.6 mi)	Flat stage	Lorena Wiebes (NED)
6	7 July	Colico to Colico (Lake Como)	155 km (96 mi)	Flat stage	Emma Norsgaard Jørgensen (DEN)
7	8 July	Sporazocco di Gavardo to Puegnago del Garda	109.6 km (68.1 mi)	Hilly stage	Marianne Vos (NED)
8	9 July	San Vendemiano to Mortegliano	129.4 km (80.4 mi)	Flat stage	Lorena Wiebes (NED)
9	10 July	Feletto Umberto to Monte Matajur	122.6 km (76.2 mi)	Mountain stage	Ashleigh Moolman (RSA)
10	11 July	Capriva del Friuli to Cormons	113 km (70 mi)	Hilly stage	Coryn Rivera (USA)
Total			1,022.7 km (635.5 mi)		

== Stages ==
=== Stage 1 ===
2 July 2021 — Fossano to Cuneo, 26.7 km (16.6 mi) (TTT)

Stage 1 Result
Rank	Team	Time
1	Trek–Segafredo	33' 40"
2	SD Worx	+ 8"
3	Alé BTC Ljubljana	+ 40"
4	Canyon//SRAM	+ 46"
5	Movistar Team	+ 55"
6	Team Jumbo–Visma	+ 1' 16"
7	Ceratizit–WNT Pro Cycling	+ 1' 18"
8	Tibco–Silicon Valley Bank	+ 1' 19"
9	Team DSM	+ 1' 23"
10	Team BikeExchange	+ 1' 31"

General classification after Stage 1
Rank	Rider	Team	Time
1	Ruth Winder (USA)	Trek–Segafredo	33' 40"
2	Ellen van Dijk (NED)	Trek–Segafredo	+ 0"
3	Elisa Longo Borghini (ITA)	Trek–Segafredo	+ 0"
4	Lizzie Deignan (GBR)	Trek–Segafredo	+ 0"
5	Ashleigh Moolman (RSA)	SD Worx	+ 8"
6	Demi Vollering (NED)	SD Worx	+ 8"
7	Anna van der Breggen (NED)	SD Worx	+ 8"
8	Niamh Fisher-Black (NZL)	SD Worx	+ 8"
9	Elena Cecchini (ITA)	SD Worx	+ 8"
10	Mavi García (ESP)	Alé BTC Ljubljana	+ 40"

=== Stage 2 ===
3 July 2021 — Boves to Prato Nevoso, 100.1 km (62.2 mi)

Stage 2 Result
Rank	Rider	Team	Time
1	Anna van der Breggen (NED)	SD Worx	2h 58' 31"
2	Ashleigh Moolman (RSA)	SD Worx	+ 1' 22"
3	Demi Vollering (NED)	SD Worx	+ 1' 51"
4	Marta Cavalli (ITA)	FDJ Nouvelle-Aquitaine Futuroscope	+ 1' 53"
5	Erica Magnaldi (ITA)	Ceratizit–WNT Pro Cycling	+ 2' 30"
6	Gaia Realini (ITA)	Isolmant–Premac–Vittoria	+ 2' 36"
7	Mavi García (ESP)	Alé BTC Ljubljana	+ 3' 00"
8	Amanda Spratt (AUS)	Team BikeExchange	+ 3' 05"
9	Tatiana Guderzo (ITA)	Alé BTC Ljubljana	+ 3' 26"
10	Juliette Labous (FRA)	Team DSM	+ 3' 29"

General classification after Stage 2
Rank	Rider	Team	Time
1	Anna van der Breggen (NED)	SD Worx	3h 32' 09"
2	Ashleigh Moolman (RSA)	SD Worx	+ 1' 26"
3	Demi Vollering (NED)	SD Worx	+ 1' 57"
4	Lizzie Deignan (GBR)	Trek–Segafredo	+ 3' 31"
5	Mavi García (ESP)	Alé BTC Ljubljana	+ 3' 42"
6	Erica Magnaldi (ITA)	Ceratizit–WNT Pro Cycling	+ 3' 50"
7	Tatiana Guderzo (ITA)	Alé BTC Ljubljana	+ 4' 08"
8	Niamh Fisher-Black (NZL)	SD Worx	+ 4' 18"
9	Amanda Spratt (AUS)	Team BikeExchange	+ 4' 38"
10	Juliette Labous (FRA)	Team DSM	+ 4' 54"

=== Stage 3 ===
4 July 2021 — Casale Monferrato to Ovada, 135 km (84 mi)

Stage 3 Result
Rank	Rider	Team	Time
1	Marianne Vos (NED)	Team Jumbo–Visma	3h 31' 24"
2	Lucinda Brand (NED)	Trek–Segafredo	+ 0"
3	Liane Lippert (GER)	Team DSM	+ 0"
4	Elise Chabbey (SUI)	Canyon//SRAM	+ 0"
5	Lisa Brennauer (GER)	Ceratizit–WNT Pro Cycling	+ 3' 18"
6	Coryn Rivera (USA)	Team DSM	+ 3' 18"
7	Emma Norsgaard Jørgensen (DEN)	Movistar Team	+ 3' 18"
8	Marta Bastianelli (ITA)	Alé BTC Ljubljana	+ 3' 18"
9	Ilaria Sanguineti (ITA)	Valcar–Travel & Service	+ 3' 18"
10	Marta Lach (POL)	Ceratizit–WNT Pro Cycling	+ 3' 18"

General classification after Stage 3
Rank	Rider	Team	Time
1	Anna van der Breggen (NED)	SD Worx	7h 15' 56"
2	Ashleigh Moolman (RSA)	SD Worx	+ 1' 21"
3	Demi Vollering (NED)	SD Worx	+ 1' 57"
4	Elise Chabbey (SUI)	Canyon//SRAM	+ 2' 36"
5	Lizzie Deignan (GBR)	Trek–Segafredo	+ 3' 31"
6	Mavi García (ESP)	Alé BTC Ljubljana	+ 3' 42"
7	Erica Magnaldi (ITA)	Ceratizit–WNT Pro Cycling	+ 3' 50"
8	Tatiana Guderzo (ITA)	Alé BTC Ljubljana	+ 4' 08"
9	Niamh Fisher-Black (NZL)	SD Worx	+ 4' 18"
10	Amanda Spratt (AUS)	Team BikeExchange	+ 4' 33"

=== Stage 4 ===
5 July 2021 — Formazza (Fondovalle) to Riale di Formazza Cascata del Toce, 11.2 km (7.0 mi) (ITT)

Stage 4 Result
Rank	Rider	Team	Time
1	Anna van der Breggen (NED)	SD Worx	24' 57"
2	Demi Vollering (NED)	SD Worx	+ 1' 06"
3	Grace Brown (AUS)	Team BikeExchange	+ 1' 17"
4	Ashleigh Moolman (RSA)	SD Worx	+ 1' 30"
5	Marta Cavalli (ITA)	FDJ Nouvelle-Aquitaine Futuroscope	+ 1' 55"
6	Juliette Labous (FRA)	Team DSM	+ 2' 14"
7	Katrine Aalerud (NOR)	Movistar Team	+ 2' 15"
8	Lizzie Deignan (GBR)	Trek–Segafredo	+ 2' 22"
9	Gaia Realini (ITA)	Isolmant–Premac–Vittoria	+ 2' 22"
10	Elisa Longo Borghini (ITA)	Trek–Segafredo	+ 2' 38"

General classification after Stage 4
Rank	Rider	Team	Time
1	Anna van der Breggen (NED)	SD Worx	7h 40' 53"
2	Ashleigh Moolman (RSA)	SD Worx	+ 2' 51"
3	Demi Vollering (NED)	SD Worx	+ 3' 03"
4	Lizzie Deignan (GBR)	Trek–Segafredo	+ 5' 53"
5	Elise Chabbey (SUI)	Canyon//SRAM	+ 6' 12"
6	Erica Magnaldi (ITA)	Ceratizit–WNT Pro Cycling	+ 6' 35"
7	Mavi García (ESP)	Alé BTC Ljubljana	+ 6' 57"
8	Juliette Labous (FRA)	Team DSM	+ 7' 03"
9	Niamh Fisher-Black (NZL)	SD Worx	+ 7' 22"
10	Tatiana Guderzo (ITA)	Alé BTC Ljubljana	+ 7' 24"

=== Stage 5 ===
6 July 2021 — Milan to Carugate, 120.1 km (74.6 mi)

Stage 5 Result
Rank	Rider	Team	Time
1	Lorena Wiebes (NED)	Team DSM	2h 49' 15"
2	Emma Norsgaard Jørgensen (DEN)	Movistar Team	+ 0"
3	Marianne Vos (NED)	Team Jumbo–Visma	+ 0"
4	Lucinda Brand (NED)	Trek–Segafredo	+ 0"
5	Marta Bastianelli (ITA)	Alé BTC Ljubljana	+ 0"
6	Maria Giulia Confalonieri (ITA)	Ceratizit–WNT Pro Cycling	+ 0"
7	Sofia Bertizzolo (ITA)	Liv Racing	+ 0"
8	Eleonora Gasparrini (ITA)	Valcar–Travel & Service	+ 0"
9	Maria Vittoria Sperotto (ITA)	A.R. Monex	+ 0"
10	Coryn Rivera (USA)	Team DSM	+ 0"

General classification after Stage 5
Rank	Rider	Team	Time
1	Anna van der Breggen (NED)	SD Worx	10h 30' 08"
2	Ashleigh Moolman (RSA)	SD Worx	+ 2' 51"
3	Demi Vollering (NED)	SD Worx	+ 3' 03"
4	Lizzie Deignan (GBR)	Trek–Segafredo	+ 5' 53"
5	Elise Chabbey (SUI)	Canyon//SRAM	+ 6' 12"
6	Erica Magnaldi (ITA)	Ceratizit–WNT Pro Cycling	+ 6' 35"
7	Mavi García (ESP)	Alé BTC Ljubljana	+ 6' 57"
8	Juliette Labous (FRA)	Team DSM	+ 7' 01"
9	Niamh Fisher-Black (NZL)	SD Worx	+ 7' 22"
10	Tatiana Guderzo (ITA)	Alé BTC Ljubljana	+ 7' 24"

=== Stage 6 ===
7 July 2021 — Colico to Colico (Lake Como), 155 km (96 mi)

Stage 6 Result
Rank	Rider	Team	Time
1	Emma Norsgaard Jørgensen (DEN)	Movistar Team	3h 41' 39"
2	Coryn Rivera (USA)	Team DSM	+ 0"
3	Marianne Vos (NED)	Team Jumbo–Visma	+ 0"
4	Marta Bastianelli (ITA)	Alé BTC Ljubljana	+ 0"
5	Lisa Brennauer (GER)	Ceratizit–WNT Pro Cycling	+ 0"
6	Lucinda Brand (NED)	Trek–Segafredo	+ 0"
7	Ilaria Sanguineti (ITA)	Valcar–Travel & Service	+ 0"
8	Sofia Bertizzolo (ITA)	Liv Racing	+ 0"
9	Maria Vittoria Sperotto (ITA)	A.R. Monex	+ 0"
10	Elena Cecchini (ITA)	SD Worx	+ 0"

General classification after Stage 6
Rank	Rider	Team	Time
1	Anna van der Breggen (NED)	SD Worx	14h 11' 47"
2	Ashleigh Moolman (RSA)	SD Worx	+ 2' 51"
3	Demi Vollering (NED)	SD Worx	+ 3' 03"
4	Lizzie Deignan (GBR)	Trek–Segafredo	+ 5' 53"
5	Elise Chabbey (SUI)	Canyon//SRAM	+ 6' 12"
6	Erica Magnaldi (ITA)	Ceratizit–WNT Pro Cycling	+ 6' 35"
7	Mavi García (ESP)	Alé BTC Ljubljana	+ 6' 57"
8	Juliette Labous (FRA)	Team DSM	+ 7' 01"
9	Niamh Fisher-Black (NZL)	SD Worx	+ 7' 22"
10	Tatiana Guderzo (ITA)	Alé BTC Ljubljana	+ 7' 24"

=== Stage 7 ===
8 July 2021 — Sporazocco di Gavardo to Puegnago del Garda, 109.6 km (68.1 mi)

Stage 7 Result
Rank	Rider	Team	Time
1	Marianne Vos (NED)	Team Jumbo–Visma	2h 48' 31"
2	Elisa Longo Borghini (ITA)	Trek–Segafredo	+ 0"
3	Anna van der Breggen (NED)	SD Worx	+ 0"
4	Demi Vollering (NED)	SD Worx	+ 0"
5	Soraya Paladin (ITA)	Liv Racing	+ 0"
6	Juliette Labous (FRA)	Team DSM	+ 0"
7	Marta Cavalli (ITA)	FDJ Nouvelle-Aquitaine Futuroscope	+ 0"
8	Ashleigh Moolman (RSA)	SD Worx	+ 0"
9	Ilaria Sanguineti (ITA)	Valcar–Travel & Service	+ 0"
10	Mavi García (ESP)	Alé BTC Ljubljana	+ 0"

General classification after Stage 7
Rank	Rider	Team	Time
1	Anna van der Breggen (NED)	SD Worx	17h 00' 14"
2	Ashleigh Moolman (RSA)	SD Worx	+ 2' 55"
3	Demi Vollering (NED)	SD Worx	+ 3' 07"
4	Lizzie Deignan (GBR)	Trek–Segafredo	+ 5' 56"
5	Elise Chabbey (SUI)	Canyon//SRAM	+ 6' 27"
6	Erica Magnaldi (ITA)	Ceratizit–WNT Pro Cycling	+ 6' 39"
7	Mavi García (ESP)	Alé BTC Ljubljana	+ 7' 01"
8	Juliette Labous (FRA)	Team DSM	+ 7' 05"
9	Tatiana Guderzo (ITA)	Alé BTC Ljubljana	+ 7' 28"
10	Niamh Fisher-Black (NZL)	SD Worx	+ 7' 50"

=== Stage 8 ===
9 July 2021 — San Vendemiano to Mortegliano, 129.4 km (80.4 mi)

Stage 8 Result
Rank	Rider	Team	Time
1	Lorena Wiebes (NED)	Team DSM	3h 10' 01"
2	Emma Norsgaard Jørgensen (DEN)	Movistar Team	+ 0"
3	Maria Vittoria Sperotto (ITA)	A.R. Monex	+ 0"
4	Lisa Brennauer (GER)	Ceratizit–WNT Pro Cycling	+ 0"
5	Marianne Vos (NED)	Team Jumbo–Visma	+ 0"
6	Marta Bastianelli (ITA)	Alé BTC Ljubljana	+ 0"
7	Elena Cecchini (ITA)	SD Worx	+ 0"
8	Sofia Bertizzolo (ITA)	Liv Racing	+ 0"
9	Ilaria Sanguineti (ITA)	Valcar–Travel & Service	+ 0"
10	Lucinda Brand (NED)	Trek–Segafredo	+ 0"

General classification after Stage 8
Rank	Rider	Team	Time
1	Anna van der Breggen (NED)	SD Worx	20h 10' 15"
2	Ashleigh Moolman (RSA)	SD Worx	+ 2' 55"
3	Demi Vollering (NED)	SD Worx	+ 3' 07"
4	Lizzie Deignan (GBR)	Trek–Segafredo	+ 5' 56"
5	Elise Chabbey (SUI)	Canyon//SRAM	+ 6' 27"
6	Erica Magnaldi (ITA)	Ceratizit–WNT Pro Cycling	+ 6' 39"
7	Mavi García (ESP)	Alé BTC Ljubljana	+ 7' 01"
8	Juliette Labous (FRA)	Team DSM	+ 7' 05"
9	Tatiana Guderzo (ITA)	Alé BTC Ljubljana	+ 7' 28"
10	Niamh Fisher-Black (NZL)	SD Worx	+ 7' 50"

=== Stage 9 ===
10 July 2021 — Feletto Umberto to Monte Matajur, 122.6 km (76.2 mi)

Stage 9 Result
Rank	Rider	Team	Time
1	Ashleigh Moolman (RSA)	SD Worx	3h 52' 35"
2	Demi Vollering (NED)	SD Worx	+ 1' 26"
3	Anna van der Breggen (NED)	SD Worx	+ 1' 26"
4	Marta Cavalli (ITA)	FDJ Nouvelle-Aquitaine Futuroscope	+ 1' 39"
5	Lizzie Deignan (GBR)	Trek–Segafredo	+ 2' 14"
6	Mavi García (ESP)	Alé BTC Ljubljana	+ 2' 27"
7	Juliette Labous (FRA)	Team DSM	+ 2' 37"
8	Tatiana Guderzo (ITA)	Alé BTC Ljubljana	+ 2' 46"
9	Niamh Fisher-Black (NZL)	SD Worx	+ 2' 56"
10	Évita Muzic (FRA)	FDJ Nouvelle-Aquitaine Futuroscope	+ 3' 25"

General classification after Stage 9
Rank	Rider	Team	Time
1	Anna van der Breggen (NED)	SD Worx	24h 04' 12"
2	Ashleigh Moolman (RSA)	SD Worx	+ 1' 23"
3	Demi Vollering (NED)	SD Worx	+ 3' 05"
4	Lizzie Deignan (GBR)	Trek–Segafredo	+ 6' 48"
5	Mavi García (ESP)	Alé BTC Ljubljana	+ 8' 06"
6	Marta Cavalli (ITA)	FDJ Nouvelle-Aquitaine Futuroscope	+ 8' 09"
7	Juliette Labous (FRA)	Team DSM	+ 8' 20"
8	Tatiana Guderzo (ITA)	Alé BTC Ljubljana	+ 8' 52"
9	Niamh Fisher-Black (NZL)	SD Worx	+ 9' 24"
10	Gaia Realini (ITA)	Isolmant–Premac–Vittoria	+ 10' 33"

=== Stage 10 ===
11 July 2021 — Capriva del Friuli to Cormons, 113 km (70 mi)

Stage 10 Result
Rank	Rider	Team	Time
1	Coryn Rivera (USA)	Team DSM	2h 56' 40"
2	Lizzie Deignan (GBR)	Trek–Segafredo	+ 0"
3	Elise Chabbey (SUI)	Canyon//SRAM	+ 3"
4	Anna van der Breggen (NED)	SD Worx	+ 3"
5	Emma Norsgaard Jørgensen (DEN)	Movistar Team	+ 23"
6	Liane Lippert (GER)	Team DSM	+ 23"
9	Ilaria Sanguineti (ITA)	Valcar–Travel & Service	+ 23"
5	Anouska Koster (NED)	Team Jumbo–Visma	+ 23"
8	Sofia Bertizzolo (ITA)	Liv Racing	+ 23"
3	Alexis Ryan (USA)	Canyon//SRAM	+ 23"

General classification after Stage 10
Rank	Rider	Team	Time
1	Anna van der Breggen (NED)	SD Worx	27h 00' 55"
2	Ashleigh Moolman (RSA)	SD Worx	+ 1' 43"
3	Demi Vollering (NED)	SD Worx	+ 3' 25"
4	Lizzie Deignan (GBR)	Trek–Segafredo	+ 6' 39"
5	Mavi García (ESP)	Alé BTC Ljubljana	+ 8' 26"
6	Marta Cavalli (ITA)	FDJ Nouvelle-Aquitaine Futuroscope	+ 8' 29"
7	Juliette Labous (FRA)	Team DSM	+ 8' 40"
8	Tatiana Guderzo (ITA)	Alé BTC Ljubljana	+ 9' 12"
9	Niamh Fisher-Black (NZL)	SD Worx	+ 9' 44"
10	Elise Chabbey (SUI)	Canyon//SRAM	+ 10' 42"

== Classification leadership table ==
In the 2021 Giro d'Italia Donne, five different jerseys were awarded.

The most important was the general classification (GC), which was calculated by adding each cyclist's finishing times on each stage. Time bonuses were awarded to the first three finishers on all stages with the exception of the time trials: the stage winner won a ten-second bonus, with six and four seconds for the second and third placed riders, respectively. Bonus seconds were also awarded to the first three riders at intermediate sprints; three seconds for the winner of the sprint, two seconds for the rider in second, and one second for the rider in third. The rider with the least accumulated time after each stage was the race leader, identified by the pink jersey. This classification was considered the most important of the race, and the winner of the classification was considered the winner of the race.

Additionally, there was a points classification, for which cyclists received points for finishing in the top 10 of each stage. For winning a stage, a rider earned 15 points, with 12 for second, 10 for third, 8 for fourth, 6 for fifth, with a point fewer per place down to a single point for 10th place. The rider with the most accumulated points after each stage was identified by the cyclamen jersey.

Points for the mountains classification
Position	1	2	3	4	5
Points for Category 1	13	11	9	7	5
Points for Category 2	7	5	3	2	1
Points for Category 3	5	4	3	2	1

There was also a mountains classification, the leadership of which was marked by a green jersey. In the mountains classification, points were won by being one of the first five riders to reach the top of a climb. Each climb was categorised as either first, second, or third-category, with more points available for the higher-categorised climbs. Of the 18 categorised climbs in the race, a majority were third-category climbs; only two climbs were marked as first-category, with there only being one second-category climb.

The young rider and the Italian rider classifications were decided in the same way as the general classification. However, only riders born on or after 1 January 1998 were eligible to be ranked in the former, while only riders born in Italy were eligible to be ranked in the latter classification. The leader of the young rider classification wore a white jersey. The leader of the Italian rider classification was awarded a blue jersey, but this jersey was not worn during the race.

There was also a team classification, for which the times of the best three cyclists per team on each stage were added together; the leading team at the end of each stage and at the race was the team with the lowest total time. Riders of the team classification leaders wore red dossards on the following stage.

Classification leadership by stage
Stage	Winner	General classification	Points classification	Mountains classification	Young rider classification	Italian rider classification	Team classification
1	Trek–Segafredo	Ruth Winder	Not awarded	Not awarded	Niamh Fisher-Black	Elisa Longo Borghini	Trek–Segafredo
2	Anna van der Breggen	Anna van der Breggen	Anna van der Breggen	Anna van der Breggen	Niamh Fisher-Black	Erica Magnaldi	SD Worx
3	Marianne Vos	Anna van der Breggen	Anna van der Breggen	Elise Chabbey	Niamh Fisher-Black	Erica Magnaldi	SD Worx
4	Anna van der Breggen	Anna van der Breggen	Anna van der Breggen	Elise Chabbey	Niamh Fisher-Black	Erica Magnaldi	SD Worx
5	Lorena Wiebes	Anna van der Breggen	Anna van der Breggen	Elise Chabbey	Niamh Fisher-Black	Erica Magnaldi	SD Worx
6	Emma Norsgaard Jørgensen	Anna van der Breggen	Marianne Vos	Elise Chabbey	Niamh Fisher-Black	Erica Magnaldi	SD Worx
7	Marianne Vos	Anna van der Breggen	Marianne Vos	Lucinda Brand	Niamh Fisher-Black	Erica Magnaldi	SD Worx
8	Lorena Wiebes	Anna van der Breggen	Marianne Vos	Lucinda Brand	Niamh Fisher-Black	Erica Magnaldi	SD Worx
9	Ashleigh Moolman	Anna van der Breggen	Anna van der Breggen	Lucinda Brand	Niamh Fisher-Black	Marta Cavalli	SD Worx
10	Coryn Rivera	Anna van der Breggen	Anna van der Breggen	Lucinda Brand	Niamh Fisher-Black	Marta Cavalli	SD Worx
Final		Anna van der Breggen	Anna van der Breggen	Lucinda Brand	Niamh Fisher-Black	Marta Cavalli	SD Worx

- For stage 2, per the race regulations, Ashleigh Moolman, the first-placed rider of the second-placed team (SD Worx), was assigned the cyclamen jersey of the leader of the points classification, and Mavi García, the first-placed rider of the third-placed team (Alé BTC Ljubljana), was assigned the green jersey of the leader of the mountains classification. However, neither rider was deemed to be officially leading those respective classifications, as no points had been awarded on stage 1 for either classification.
- On stage 3, Ashleigh Moolman, who was second in the points classification, wore the cyclamen jersey, because first placed Anna van der Breggen wore the pink jersey as the leader of the general classification. Because van der Breggen and Moolman were also first and second, respectively, in the mountains classification, Demi Vollering, who was third in that classification, wore the green jersey.
- On stages 4 and 6, Marianne Vos, who was second in the points classification, wore the cyclamen jersey, because first placed Anna van der Breggen wore the pink jersey as the leader of the general classification. For the same reason, Demi Vollering wore the cyclamen jersey on stage 5.
- On stage 9, Emma Norsgaard Jørgensen, who was second in the points classification, wore the cyclamen jersey, because first placed Marianne Vos pulled out prior to the stage to focus on the Olympic Games. On stage 10, Norsgaard Jørgensen continued wearing the cyclamen jersey, because first placed Anna van der Breggen wore the pink jersey as the leader of the general classification.

== Final classification standings ==
Legend
Denotes the winner of the general classification	Denotes the winner of the mountains classification
Denotes the winner of the points classification	Denotes the winner of the young rider classification
Denotes the winner of the Italian rider classification	Denotes the winner of the team classification

=== General classification ===
Final general classification (1–10)
Rank	Rider	Team	Time
1	Anna van der Breggen (NED)	SD Worx	27h 00' 55"
2	Ashleigh Moolman (RSA)	SD Worx	+ 1' 43"
3	Demi Vollering (NED)	SD Worx	+ 3' 25"
4	Lizzie Deignan (GBR)	Trek–Segafredo	+ 6' 39"
5	Mavi García (ESP)	Alé BTC Ljubljana	+ 8' 26"
6	Marta Cavalli (ITA)	FDJ Nouvelle-Aquitaine Futuroscope	+ 8' 29"
7	Juliette Labous (FRA)	Team DSM	+ 8' 40"
8	Tatiana Guderzo (ITA)	Alé BTC Ljubljana	+ 9' 12"
9	Niamh Fisher-Black (NZL)	SD Worx	+ 9' 44"
10	Elise Chabbey (SUI)	Canyon//SRAM	+ 10' 42"

=== Points classification ===
Final points classification (1–10)
Rank	Rider	Team	Points
1	Anna van der Breggen (NED)	SD Worx	58
2	Emma Norsgaard Jørgensen (DEN)	Movistar Team	49
3	Demi Vollering (NED)	SD Worx	42
4	Ashleigh Moolman (RSA)	SD Worx	38
5	Coryn Rivera (USA)	Team DSM	33
6	Lorena Wiebes (NED)	Team DSM	30
7	Marta Cavalli (ITA)	FDJ Nouvelle-Aquitaine Futuroscope	26
8	Lucinda Brand (NED)	Trek–Segafredo	26
9	Marta Bastianelli (ITA)	Alé BTC Ljubljana	22
10	Lizzie Deignan (GBR)	Trek–Segafredo	21

=== Mountains classification ===
Final mountains classification (1–10)
Rank	Rider	Team	Points
1	Lucinda Brand (NED)	Trek–Segafredo	47
2	Ashleigh Moolman (RSA)	SD Worx	31
3	Anna van der Breggen (NED)	SD Worx	29
4	Elise Chabbey (SUI)	Canyon//SRAM	29
5	Elisa Longo Borghini (ITA)	Trek–Segafredo	26
6	Demi Vollering (NED)	SD Worx	25
7	Liane Lippert (GER)	Team DSM	18
8	Coryn Rivera (USA)	Team DSM	16
9	Marta Cavalli (ITA)	FDJ Nouvelle-Aquitaine Futuroscope	16
10	Elisa Longo Borghini (ITA)	Trek–Segafredo	12

=== Young rider classification ===
Final young rider classification (1–10)
Rank	Rider	Team	Time
1	Niamh Fisher-Black (NZL)	SD Worx	27h 10' 39"
2	Gaia Realini (ITA)	Isolmant–Premac–Vittoria	+ 1' 09"
3	Évita Muzic (FRA)	FDJ Nouvelle-Aquitaine Futuroscope	+ 1' 55"
4	Barbara Malcotti (ITA)	Valcar–Travel & Service	+ 15' 04"
5	Silke Smulders (NED)	Lotto–Soudal Ladies	+ 21' 07"
6	Léa Curinier (FRA)	Arkéa Pro Cycling Team	+ 25' 02"
7	Lorena Wiebes (NED)	Team DSM	+ 37' 21"
8	Camilla Alessio (ITA)	Bepink	+ 42' 24"
9	Maria Novolodskaya (RUS)	A.R. Monex	+ 43' 23"
10	Emma Norsgaard Jørgensen (DEN)	Movistar Team	+ 47' 23"

=== Italian rider classification ===
Final Italian rider classification (1–10)
Rank	Rider	Team	Time
1	Marta Cavalli (ITA)	FDJ Nouvelle-Aquitaine Futuroscope	27h 09' 24"
2	Tatiana Guderzo (ITA)	Alé BTC Ljubljana	+ 43"
3	Gaia Realini (ITA)	Isolmant–Premac–Vittoria	+ 2' 24"
4	Erica Magnaldi (ITA)	Ceratizit–WNT Pro Cycling	+ 3' 30"
5	Elisa Longo Borghini (ITA)	Trek–Segafredo	+ 6' 36"
6	Barbara Malcotti (ITA)	Valcar–Travel & Service	+ 16' 19"
7	Soraya Paladin (ITA)	Liv Racing	+ 22' 04"
8	Nadia Quagliotto (ITA)	Bepink	+ 22' 24"
9	Alice Maria Arzuffi (ITA)	Valcar–Travel & Service	+ 24' 31"
10	Greta Marturano (ITA)	Top Girls Fassa Bortolo	+ 26' 19"

=== Team classification ===
Final team classification (1–10)
Rank	Team	Time
1	SD Worx	80h 01' 01"
2	FDJ Nouvelle-Aquitaine Futuroscope	+ 24' 32"
3	Trek–Segafredo	+ 32' 03"
4	Team DSM	+ 36' 55"
5	Canyon//SRAM	+ 38' 46"
6	Ceratizit–WNT Pro Cycling	+ 47' 36"
7	Alé BTC Ljubljana	+ 48' 34"
8	Liv Racing	+ 56' 11"
9	Team BikeExchange	+ 1h 09' 49"
10	Valcar–Travel & Service	+ 1h 22' 20"

== See also ==
- 2021 in women's road cycling
