= 2021 UCI Women's ProSeries =

- Second edition of the UCI Women's ProSeries

Details
- Dates: 27 February – 3 October 2021
- Location: Europe
- Races: 7

The 2021 UCI Women's ProSeries was the second season of the second-tier UCI Women's ProSeries road cycling tour, which sits below the UCI Women's World Tour but above the UCI Class 1 and Class 2 races.

The 2021 season initially consisted of eight events, of which four were one-day races (1.Pro) and stage races (2.Pro). Of these eight events, the only non-European event was the season-opening Women's Tour Down Under stage race in Australia. However, on 1 November 2020, it was cancelled due to the COVID-19 pandemic, leaving only the seven remaining European races.

The most notable event on the calendar was the Giro Rosa stage race. Though it is usually one of the most prestigious events in the women's calendar, it was demoted from the UCI Women's World Tour after the 2020 season, with the move being attributed to race organizers failing to provide the minimum of 45 minutes of live television coverage required for all top-tier Women's WorldTour races.

== Events ==
Races in the 2021 UCI Women's ProSeries
Race	Date	Winner	Team	Ref.
(Australia) Women's Tour Down Under	14–17 January	Cancelled		
(Belgium) Omloop Het Nieuwsblad	27 February	Anna van der Breggen (NED)	SD Worx	
(Belgium) Nokere Koerse	17 March	Amy Pieters (NED)	SD Worx	
(Luxembourg) Festival Elsy Jacobs	30 April – 2 May	Emma Norsgaard Jørgensen (DEN)	Movistar Team	
(Germany) Thüringen Ladies Tour	25–30 May	Lucinda Brand (NED)	Trek–Segafredo	
(Italy) Giro Rosa	2–11 July	Anna van der Breggen (NED)	SD Worx	
(Italy) Giro dell'Emilia Internazionale Donne Elite	2 October	Mavi García (ESP)	Alé BTC Ljubljana	
