= 2021 Festival Elsy Jacobs =

2021 UCI Women's ProSeries, race 3 of 7

Race details
- Dates: 30 April – 2 May 2021
- Stages: 2 + Prologue
- Distance: 232.6 km (144.5 mi)
- Winning time: 6h 05' 00"

Results
Jersey awarded to the overall winner	Winner	Emma Norsgaard Jørgensen (DEN)	(Movistar Team)
	Second	Leah Kirchmann (CAN)	(Team DSM)
	Third	Maria Giulia Confalonieri (ITA)	(Ceratizit–WNT Pro Cycling)
Jersey awarded to the points classification winner	Points	Emma Norsgaard Jørgensen (DEN)	(Movistar Team)
Jersey awarded to the mountains classification winner	Mountains	Thalita de Jong (NED)	(Bingoal Casino–Chevalmeire)
Jersey awarded to the youth classification winner	Youth	Emma Norsgaard Jørgensen (DEN)	(Movistar Team)
	Team	Team Jumbo–Visma	

The 2021 Festival Luxembourgeois du cyclisme féminin Elsy Jacobs (known as the Ceratizit Festival Elsy Jacobs for sponsorship reasons) was a women's road cycling stage race that was held in Luxembourg from 30 April to 2 May 2021. It was the 13th edition of the Festival Elsy Jacobs and the first as a category 2.Pro event in the UCI Women's ProSeries after its promotion after the 2019 season and the cancellation of the 2020 edition of the race.

== Teams ==
Eight of the nine UCI Women's WorldTeams and ten UCI Women's Continental Teams made up the eighteen teams that participated the race. Each team entered a full squad of six riders, but two Alé BTC Ljubljana riders had to pull out prior to the start of the race. This left 106 riders who started the race, of which 67 finished.

UCI Women's WorldTeams

- Alé BTC Ljubljana
- Canyon//SRAM
- FDJ Nouvelle-Aquitaine Futuroscope
- Liv Racing
- Movistar Team
- SD Worx
- Team DSM
- Trek–Segafredo

UCI Women's Continental Teams

- Andy Schleck–CP NVST–Immo Losch
- Bingoal Casino–Chevalmeire
- Ceratizit–WNT Pro Cycling
- Drops–Le Col
- Massi–Tactic
- Parkhotel Valkenburg
- Stade Rochelais Charente-Maritime
- Team Jumbo–Visma
- Valcar–Travel & Service
- WCC Team

== Route ==
Stage characteristics and winners
Stage	Date	Course	Distance	Type	Winner
P	30 April	Cessange to Cessange	2.2 km (1.4 mi)	Individual time trial	Lorena Wiebes (NED)
1	1 May	Steinfort to Steinfort	125.1 km (77.7 mi)	Hilly stage	Emma Norsgaard Jørgensen (DEN)
2	2 May	Garnich to Garnich	105.3 km (65.4 mi)	Hilly stage	Emma Norsgaard Jørgensen (DEN)
Total			232.6 km (144.5 mi)		

== Stages ==
=== Prologue ===
30 April 2021 — Cessange to Cessange, 2.2 km (1.4 mi) (ITT)

Prologue Result
Rank	Rider	Team	Time
1	Lorena Wiebes (NED)	Team DSM	3' 12"
2	Leah Kirchmann (CAN)	Team DSM	+ 3"
3	Karlijn Swinkels (NED)	Team Jumbo–Visma	+ 3"
4	Thalita de Jong (NED)	Bingoal Casino–Chevalmeire	+ 5"
5	Lonneke Uneken (NED)	SD Worx	+ 5"
6	Anouska Koster (NED)	Team Jumbo–Visma	+ 5"
7	Ruth Winder (USA)	Trek–Segafredo	+ 6"
8	Christine Majerus (LUX)	SD Worx	+ 6"
9	Riejanne Markus (NED)	Team Jumbo–Visma	+ 7"
10	Emma Norsgaard Jørgensen (DEN)	Movistar Team	+ 7"

General classification after Prologue
Rank	Rider	Team	Time
1	Lorena Wiebes (NED)	Team DSM	3' 12"
2	Leah Kirchmann (CAN)	Team DSM	+ 3"
3	Karlijn Swinkels (NED)	Team Jumbo–Visma	+ 3"
4	Thalita de Jong (NED)	Bingoal Casino–Chevalmeire	+ 5"
5	Lonneke Uneken (NED)	SD Worx	+ 5"
6	Anouska Koster (NED)	Team Jumbo–Visma	+ 5"
7	Ruth Winder (USA)	Trek–Segafredo	+ 6"
8	Christine Majerus (LUX)	SD Worx	+ 6"
9	Riejanne Markus (NED)	Team Jumbo–Visma	+ 7"
10	Emma Norsgaard Jørgensen (DEN)	Movistar Team	+ 7"

=== Stage 1 ===
1 May 2021 — Steinfort to Steinfort, 125.1 km (77.7 mi)

Stage 1 Result
Rank	Rider	Team	Time
1	Emma Norsgaard Jørgensen (DEN)	Movistar Team	3h 14' 06"
2	Maria Giulia Confalonieri (ITA)	Ceratizit–WNT Pro Cycling	+ 0"
3	Leah Kirchmann (CAN)	Team DSM	+ 2"
4	Elise Chabbey (SUI)	Canyon//SRAM	+ 2"
5	Juliette Labous (FRA)	Team DSM	+ 2"
6	Christine Majerus (LUX)	SD Worx	+ 2"
7	Karlijn Swinkels (NED)	Team Jumbo–Visma	+ 2"
8	Ruth Winder (USA)	Trek–Segafredo	+ 2"
9	Riejanne Markus (NED)	Team Jumbo–Visma	+ 2"
10	Pauliena Rooijakkers (NED)	Liv Racing	+ 2"

General classification after Stage 1
Rank	Rider	Team	Time
1	Emma Norsgaard Jørgensen (DEN)	Movistar Team	3h 17' 15"
2	Leah Kirchmann (CAN)	Team DSM	+ 4"
3	Karlijn Swinkels (NED)	Team Jumbo–Visma	+ 8"
4	Maria Giulia Confalonieri (ITA)	Ceratizit–WNT Pro Cycling	+ 10"
5	Thalita de Jong (NED)	Bingoal Casino–Chevalmeire	+ 10"
6	Lonneke Uneken (NED)	SD Worx	+ 10"
7	Anouska Koster (NED)	Team Jumbo–Visma	+ 10"
8	Ruth Winder (USA)	Trek–Segafredo	+ 11"
9	Christine Majerus (LUX)	SD Worx	+ 11"
10	Riejanne Markus (NED)	Team Jumbo–Visma	+ 12"

=== Stage 2 ===
2 May 2021 — Garnich to Garnich, 105.3 km (65.4 mi)

Stage 2 Result
Rank	Rider	Team	Time
1	Emma Norsgaard Jørgensen (DEN)	Movistar Team	2h 47' 55"
2	Maria Giulia Confalonieri (ITA)	Ceratizit–WNT Pro Cycling	+ 0"
3	Sofia Bertizzolo (ITA)	Liv Racing	+ 0"
4	Silvia Persico (ITA)	Valcar–Travel & Service	+ 0"
5	Marie Le Net (FRA)	FDJ Nouvelle-Aquitaine Futuroscope	+ 0"
6	Thalita de Jong (NED)	Bingoal Casino–Chevalmeire	+ 0"
7	Leah Kirchmann (CAN)	Team DSM	+ 0"
8	Juliette Labous (FRA)	Team DSM	+ 0"
9	Karlijn Swinkels (NED)	Team Jumbo–Visma	+ 0"
10	Valerie Demey (BEL)	Liv Racing	+ 0"

General classification after Stage 2
Rank	Rider	Team	Time
1	Emma Norsgaard Jørgensen (DEN)	Movistar Team	6h 05' 00"
2	Leah Kirchmann (CAN)	Team DSM	+ 14"
3	Maria Giulia Confalonieri (ITA)	Ceratizit–WNT Pro Cycling	+ 14"
4	Karlijn Swinkels (NED)	Team Jumbo–Visma	+ 18"
5	Thalita de Jong (NED)	Bingoal Casino–Chevalmeire	+ 20"
6	Anouska Koster (NED)	Team Jumbo–Visma	+ 20"
7	Ruth Winder (USA)	Trek–Segafredo	+ 21"
8	Christine Majerus (LUX)	SD Worx	+ 21"
9	Riejanne Markus (NED)	Team Jumbo–Visma	+ 22"
10	Juliette Labous (FRA)	Team DSM	+ 23"

== Classification leadership table ==
Classification leadership by stage
Stage	Winner	General classification	Points classification	Mountains classification	Young rider classification	Team classification
P	Lorena Wiebes	Lorena Wiebes	Lorena Wiebes	Not awarded	Lorena Wiebes	Team DSM
1	Emma Norsgaard Jørgensen	Emma Norsgaard Jørgensen	Emma Norsgaard Jørgensen	Kathrin Hammes	Emma Norsgaard Jørgensen	Team DSM
2	Emma Norsgaard Jørgensen	Emma Norsgaard Jørgensen	Emma Norsgaard Jørgensen	Thalita de Jong	Emma Norsgaard Jørgensen	Team Jumbo–Visma
Final		Emma Norsgaard Jørgensen	Emma Norsgaard Jørgensen	Thalita de Jong	Emma Norsgaard Jørgensen	Team Jumbo–Visma

- On stage 2, Leah Kirchmann, who was second in the points classification, wore the green jersey, because first placed Lorena Wiebes wore the yellow jersey as the leader of the general classification. For the same reason, Karlijn Swinkels, who was second in the young rider classification, wore the white jersey.
- On stage 3, Kirchmann and Swinkels continued to wear their respective jerseys, but with Emma Norsgaard Jørgensen as the leader of the general classification.

== Final classification standings ==
Legend
Denotes the winner of the general classification	Denotes the winner of the mountains classification
Denotes the winner of the points classification	Denotes the winner of the young rider classification

=== General classification ===
Final general classification (1–10)
Rank	Rider	Team	Time
1	Emma Norsgaard Jørgensen (DEN)	Movistar Team	6h 05' 00"
2	Leah Kirchmann (CAN)	Team DSM	+ 14"
3	Maria Giulia Confalonieri (ITA)	Ceratizit–WNT Pro Cycling	+ 14"
4	Karlijn Swinkels (NED)	Team Jumbo–Visma	+ 18"
5	Thalita de Jong (NED)	Bingoal Casino–Chevalmeire	+ 20"
6	Anouska Koster (NED)	Team Jumbo–Visma	+ 20"
7	Ruth Winder (USA)	Trek–Segafredo	+ 21"
8	Christine Majerus (LUX)	SD Worx	+ 21"
9	Riejanne Markus (NED)	Team Jumbo–Visma	+ 22"
10	Juliette Labous (FRA)	Team DSM	+ 23"

=== Points classification ===
Final points classification (1–10)
Rank	Rider	Team	Points
1	Emma Norsgaard Jørgensen (DEN)	Movistar Team	30
2	Maria Giulia Confalonieri (ITA)	Ceratizit–WNT Pro Cycling	24
3	Leah Kirchmann (CAN)	Team DSM	20
4	Karlijn Swinkels (NED)	Team Jumbo–Visma	12
5	Juliette Labous (FRA)	Team DSM	11
6	Sofia Bertizzolo (ITA)	Liv Racing	10
7	Thalita de Jong (NED)	Bingoal Casino–Chevalmeire	9
8	Elise Chabbey (SUI)	Canyon//SRAM	8
9	Silvia Persico (ITA)	Valcar–Travel & Service	8
10	Lorena Wiebes (NED)	Team DSM	8

=== Mountains classification ===
Final mountains classification (1–10)
Rank	Rider	Team	Points
1	Thalita de Jong (NED)	Bingoal Casino–Chevalmeire	31
2	Kathrin Hammes (GER)	Ceratizit–WNT Pro Cycling	18
3	Dani Christmas (GBR)	Drops–Le Col	7
4	Mischa Bredewold (NED)	Parkhotel Valkenburg	5
5	Christine Majerus (LUX)	SD Worx	3
6	Mikayla Harvey (NZL)	Canyon//SRAM	3
7	Riejanne Markus (NED)	Team Jumbo–Visma	1
8	Sofia Bertizzolo (ITA)	Liv Racing	1
9	Niamh Fisher-Black (NZL)	SD Worx	1
10	Julia van Bokhoven (NED)	Parkhotel Valkenburg	1

=== Young rider classification ===
Final young rider classification (1–10)
Rank	Rider	Team	Time
1	Emma Norsgaard Jørgensen (DEN)	Movistar Team	6h 05' 00"
2	Karlijn Swinkels (NED)	Team Jumbo–Visma	+ 18"
3	Juliette Labous (FRA)	Team DSM	+ 23"
4	Sofia Bertizzolo (ITA)	Liv Racing	+ 26"
5	Niamh Fisher-Black (NZL)	SD Worx	+ 33"
6	Marie Le Net (FRA)	FDJ Nouvelle-Aquitaine Futuroscope	+ 34"
7	Mikayla Harvey (NZL)	Canyon//SRAM	+ 36"
8	Anna Shackley (GBR)	SD Worx	+ 37"
9	Shirin van Anrooij (NED)	Trek–Segafredo	+ 44"
10	Elisa Balsamo (ITA)	Valcar–Travel & Service	+ 48"

=== Team classification ===
Final team classification (1–10)
Rank	Team	Time
1	Team Jumbo–Visma	18h 16' 02"
2	SD Worx	+ 7"
3	Team DSM	+ 14"
4	Liv Racing	+ 20"
5	Trek–Segafredo	+ 45"
6	Canyon//SRAM	+ 49"
7	Movistar Team	+ 1' 06"
8	FDJ Nouvelle-Aquitaine Futuroscope	+ 1' 56"
9	Ceratizit–WNT Pro Cycling	+ 3' 11"
10	Parkhotel Valkenburg	+ 3' 48"

== See also ==
- 2021 in women's road cycling
