= 2021 Thüringen Ladies Tour =

2021 UCI Women's ProSeries, race 4 of 7

Race details
- Dates: 25–30 May 2021
- Stages: 6
- Distance: 672.6 km (417.9 mi)
- Winning time: 17h 53' 35"

Results
| Jersey awarded to the overall winner | Winner | Lucinda Brand (NED) | (Trek–Segafredo) |
| | Second | Lotte Kopecky (BEL) | (Belgium) |
| | Third | Emma Norsgaard Jørgensen (DEN) | (Movistar Team) |
| Jersey awarded to the mountains classification winner | Mountains | Kathrin Hammes (GER) | (Ceratizit–WNT Pro Cycling) |
| Jersey awarded to the young rider classification winner | Young rider | Emma Norsgaard Jørgensen (DEN) | (Movistar Team) |
| Jersey awarded to the sprints classification winner | Sprints | Lotte Kopecky (BEL) | (Belgium) |
| | Team | Trek–Segafredo | |

The 2021 Thüringen Ladies Tour (known as the Internationale LOTTO Thüringen Ladies Tour for sponsorship reasons) was the 32nd edition of the Thüringen Ladies Tour, a women's road cycling stage race being held between 25 and 30 May 2021 in the state of Thuringia in central Germany. Given the cancellation of the 2020 edition, this edition was the first since its promotion after the 2019 season to a category 2.Pro event in the UCI Women's ProSeries.

== Teams ==
Six of the nine UCI Women's WorldTeams, six UCI Women's Continental Teams, three national teams, and two elite amateur domestic teams made up the seventeen teams that participated in the race. Five teams chose not to field the maximum allowed squad of six riders; these teams were FDJ Nouvelle-Aquitaine Futuroscope, Maxx–Solar Lindig, Team Jumbo–Visma, Tibco–Silicon Valley Bank, and Trek–Segafredo, and they each entered five riders. 97 riders started the race, of which 83 finished.

UCI Women's WorldTeams

- Canyon//SRAM
- FDJ Nouvelle-Aquitaine Futuroscope
- Movistar Team
- SD Worx
- Team DSM
- Trek–Segafredo

UCI Women's Continental Teams

- Andy Schleck–CP NVST–Immo Losch
- Arkéa Pro Cycling Team
- Ceratizit–WNT Pro Cycling
- Team Coop–Hitec Products
- Team Jumbo–Visma
- Tibco–Silicon Valley Bank

National Teams

- Belgium
- Germany
- Netherlands

Elite Amateur Domestic Teams

- Maxx–Solar Lindig
- RSG Gießen Biehle

== Route ==
Stage characteristics and winners
| Stage | Date | Course | Distance | Type | Stage winner |
|---|---|---|---|---|---|
| 1 | 25 May | Schmölln to Schmölln | 88.9 km (55.2 mi) | Flat stage | Emma Norsgaard Jørgensen (DEN) |
| 2 | 26 May | Gera to Gera | 125.1 km (77.7 mi) | Flat stage | Lorena Wiebes (NED) |
| 3 | 27 May | Schleiz to Schleiz | 116.5 km (72.4 mi) | Hilly stage | Lucinda Brand (NED) |
| 4 | 28 May | Dörtendorf to Dörtendorf | 101.0 km (62.8 mi) | Hilly stage | Lotte Kopecky (BEL) |
| 5 | 29 May | Weimar to Weimar | 143.3 km (89.0 mi) | Hilly stage | Lucinda Brand (NED) |
| 6 | 30 May | Gotha to Gotha | 97.8 km (60.8 mi) | Flat stage | Lorena Wiebes (NED) |
| Total | | | 672.6 km (417.9 mi) | | |

== Stages ==
=== Stage 1 ===
25 May 2021 – Schmölln to Schmölln, 88.9 km (55.2 mi)

Stage 1 Result
| Rank | Rider | Team | Time |
|---|---|---|---|
| 1 | Emma Norsgaard Jørgensen (DEN) | Movistar Team | 2h 17' 42" |
| 2 | Lucinda Brand (NED) | Trek–Segafredo | + 0" |
| 3 | Lotte Kopecky (BEL) | Belgium | + 0" |
| 4 | Anna Henderson (GBR) | Team Jumbo–Visma | + 0" |
| 5 | Amy Pieters (NED) | SD Worx | + 0" |
| 6 | Tiffany Cromwell (AUS) | Canyon//SRAM | + 0" |
| 7 | Liane Lippert (GER) | Team DSM | + 0" |
| 8 | Kristen Faulkner (USA) | Tibco–Silicon Valley Bank | + 4" |
| 9 | Kathrin Hammes (GER) | Ceratizit–WNT Pro Cycling | + 4" |
| 10 | Emilia Fahlin (SWE) | FDJ Nouvelle-Aquitaine Futuroscope | + 7" |

General classification after Stage 1
| Rank | Rider | Team | Time |
|---|---|---|---|
| 1 | Emma Norsgaard Jørgensen (DEN) | Movistar Team | 2h 17' 32" |
| 2 | Lucinda Brand (NED) | Trek–Segafredo | + 4" |
| 3 | Lotte Kopecky (BEL) | Belgium | + 6" |
| 4 | Anna Henderson (GBR) | Team Jumbo–Visma | + 7" |
| 5 | Amy Pieters (NED) | SD Worx | + 7" |
| 6 | Tiffany Cromwell (AUS) | Canyon//SRAM | + 10" |
| 7 | Liane Lippert (GER) | Team DSM | + 10" |
| 8 | Lizzie Deignan (GBR) | Trek–Segafredo | + 13" |
| 9 | Kristen Faulkner (USA) | Tibco–Silicon Valley Bank | + 14" |
| 10 | Kathrin Hammes (GER) | Ceratizit–WNT Pro Cycling | + 14" |

=== Stage 2 ===
26 May 2021 – Gera to Gera, 125.1 km (77.7 mi)

Stage 2 Result
| Rank | Rider | Team | Time |
|---|---|---|---|
| 1 | Lorena Wiebes (NED) | Team DSM | 3h 24' 12" |
| 2 | Emma Norsgaard Jørgensen (DEN) | Movistar Team | 2h 17' 32" |
| 3 | Christine Majerus (LUX) | SD Worx | + 1" |
| 4 | Alexis Ryan (USA) | Canyon//SRAM | + 1" |
| 5 | Lotte Kopecky (BEL) | Belgium | + 1" |
| 6 | Anna Henderson (GBR) | Team Jumbo–Visma | + 1" |
| 7 | Lucinda Brand (NED) | Trek–Segafredo | + 1" |
| 8 | Susanne Andersen (NOR) | Team DSM | + 1" |
| 9 | Gladys Verhulst (FRA) | Arkéa Pro Cycling Team | + 1" |
| 10 | Clara Copponi (FRA) | FDJ Nouvelle-Aquitaine Futuroscope | + 1" |

General classification after Stage 2
| Rank | Rider | Team | Time |
|---|---|---|---|
| 1 | Emma Norsgaard Jørgensen (DEN) | Movistar Team | 5h 41' 36" |
| 2 | Lotte Kopecky (BEL) | Belgium | + 10" |
| 3 | Lucinda Brand (NED) | Trek–Segafredo | + 12" |
| 4 | Anna Henderson (GBR) | Team Jumbo–Visma | + 16" |
| 5 | Amy Pieters (NED) | SD Worx | + 16" |
| 6 | Liane Lippert (GER) | Team DSM | + 17" |
| 7 | Tiffany Cromwell (AUS) | Canyon//SRAM | + 19" |
| 8 | Lizzie Deignan (GBR) | Trek–Segafredo | + 21" |
| 9 | Kristen Faulkner (USA) | Tibco–Silicon Valley Bank | + 23" |
| 10 | Kathrin Hammes (GER) | Ceratizit–WNT Pro Cycling | + 23" |

=== Stage 3 ===
27 May 2021 – Schleiz to Schleiz, 116.5 km (72.4 mi)

Stage 3 Result
| Rank | Rider | Team | Time |
|---|---|---|---|
| 1 | Lucinda Brand (NED) | Trek–Segafredo | 3h 18' 52" |
| 2 | Emma Norsgaard Jørgensen (DEN) | Movistar Team | + 2" |
| 3 | Lotte Kopecky (BEL) | Belgium | + 2" |
| 4 | Amy Pieters (NED) | SD Worx | + 2" |
| 5 | Emilia Fahlin (SWE) | FDJ Nouvelle-Aquitaine Futuroscope | + 2" |
| 6 | Lisa Brennauer (GER) | Ceratizit–WNT Pro Cycling | + 2" |
| 7 | Kristen Faulkner (USA) | Tibco–Silicon Valley Bank | + 2" |
| 8 | Liane Lippert (GER) | Team DSM | + 2" |
| 9 | Lizzie Deignan (GBR) | Trek–Segafredo | + 2" |
| 10 | Tiffany Cromwell (AUS) | Canyon//SRAM | + 2" |

General classification after Stage 3
| Rank | Rider | Team | Time |
|---|---|---|---|
| 1 | Emma Norsgaard Jørgensen (DEN) | Movistar Team | 9h 00' 24" |
| 2 | Lucinda Brand (NED) | Trek–Segafredo | + 6" |
| 3 | Lotte Kopecky (BEL) | Belgium | + 12" |
| 4 | Amy Pieters (NED) | SD Worx | + 22" |
| 5 | Liane Lippert (GER) | Team DSM | + 23" |
| 6 | Tiffany Cromwell (AUS) | Canyon//SRAM | + 25" |
| 7 | Lizzie Deignan (GBR) | Trek–Segafredo | + 27" |
| 8 | Kristen Faulkner (USA) | Tibco–Silicon Valley Bank | + 29" |
| 9 | Emilia Fahlin (SWE) | FDJ Nouvelle-Aquitaine Futuroscope | + 30" |
| 10 | Audrey Cordon-Ragot (FRA) | Trek–Segafredo | + 41" |

=== Stage 4 ===
28 May 2021 – Dörtendorf to Dörtendorf, 101.0 km (62.8 mi)

Stage 4 Result
| Rank | Rider | Team | Time |
|---|---|---|---|
| 1 | Lotte Kopecky (BEL) | Belgium | 2h 29' 43" |
| 2 | Lucinda Brand (NED) | Trek–Segafredo | + 0" |
| 3 | Liane Lippert (GER) | Team DSM | + 0" |
| 4 | Emilia Fahlin (SWE) | FDJ Nouvelle-Aquitaine Futuroscope | + 0" |
| 5 | Marta Cavalli (ITA) | FDJ Nouvelle-Aquitaine Futuroscope | + 6" |
| 6 | Emma Norsgaard Jørgensen (DEN) | Movistar Team | + 6" |
| 7 | Amy Pieters (NED) | SD Worx | + 10" |
| 8 | Christine Majerus (LUX) | SD Worx | + 16" |
| 9 | Tiffany Cromwell (AUS) | Canyon//SRAM | + 17" |
| 10 | Lisa Brennauer (GER) | Ceratizit–WNT Pro Cycling | + 17" |

General classification after Stage 4
| Rank | Rider | Team | Time |
|---|---|---|---|
| 1 | Lucinda Brand (NED) | Trek–Segafredo | 11h 30' 07" |
| 2 | Lotte Kopecky (BEL) | Belgium | + 2" |
| 3 | Emma Norsgaard Jørgensen (DEN) | Movistar Team | + 6" |
| 4 | Liane Lippert (GER) | Team DSM | + 19" |
| 5 | Amy Pieters (NED) | SD Worx | + 29" |
| 6 | Emilia Fahlin (SWE) | FDJ Nouvelle-Aquitaine Futuroscope | + 30" |
| 7 | Tiffany Cromwell (AUS) | Canyon//SRAM | + 42" |
| 8 | Kristen Faulkner (USA) | Tibco–Silicon Valley Bank | + 51" |
| 9 | Lizzie Deignan (GBR) | Trek–Segafredo | + 57" |
| 10 | Christine Majerus (LUX) | SD Worx | + 58" |

=== Stage 5 ===
29 May 2021 – Weimar to Weimar, 143.3 km (89.0 mi)

Stage 5 Result
| Rank | Rider | Team | Time |
|---|---|---|---|
| 1 | Lucinda Brand (NED) | Trek–Segafredo | 3h 55' 08" |
| 2 | Lorena Wiebes (NED) | Team DSM | + 6" |
| 3 | Emma Norsgaard Jørgensen (DEN) | Movistar Team | + 6" |
| 4 | Alexis Ryan (USA) | Canyon//SRAM | + 6" |
| 5 | Anna Henderson (GBR) | Team Jumbo–Visma | + 6" |
| 6 | Lisa Brennauer (GER) | Ceratizit–WNT Pro Cycling | + 6" |
| 7 | Emilia Fahlin (SWE) | FDJ Nouvelle-Aquitaine Futuroscope | + 6" |
| 8 | Lotte Kopecky (BEL) | Belgium | + 6" |
| 9 | Léa Curinier (FRA) | Arkéa Pro Cycling Team | + 6" |
| 10 | Amy Pieters (NED) | SD Worx | + 6" |

General classification after Stage 5
| Rank | Rider | Team | Time |
|---|---|---|---|
| 1 | Lucinda Brand (NED) | Trek–Segafredo | 15h 25' 05" |
| 2 | Lotte Kopecky (BEL) | Belgium | + 17" |
| 3 | Emma Norsgaard Jørgensen (DEN) | Movistar Team | + 18" |
| 4 | Liane Lippert (GER) | Team DSM | + 35" |
| 5 | Amy Pieters (NED) | SD Worx | + 45" |
| 6 | Emilia Fahlin (SWE) | FDJ Nouvelle-Aquitaine Futuroscope | + 46" |
| 7 | Tiffany Cromwell (AUS) | Canyon//SRAM | + 58" |
| 8 | Lizzie Deignan (GBR) | Trek–Segafredo | + 1' 13" |
| 9 | Christine Majerus (LUX) | SD Worx | + 1' 14" |
| 10 | Valerie Demey (BEL) | Belgium | + 1' 23" |

=== Stage 6 ===
30 May 2021 – Gotha to Gotha, 97.8 km (60.8 mi)

Stage 6 Result
| Rank | Rider | Team | Time |
|---|---|---|---|
| 1 | Lorena Wiebes (NED) | Team DSM | 2h 28' 28" |
| 2 | Lotte Kopecky (BEL) | Belgium | + 0" |
| 3 | Emilia Fahlin (SWE) | FDJ Nouvelle-Aquitaine Futuroscope | + 2" |
| 4 | Jolien D'Hoore (BEL) | SD Worx | + 2" |
| 5 | Alexis Ryan (USA) | Canyon//SRAM | + 2" |
| 6 | Lucinda Brand (NED) | Trek–Segafredo | + 2" |
| 7 | Gladys Verhulst (FRA) | Arkéa Pro Cycling Team | + 2" |
| 8 | Emma Norsgaard Jørgensen (DEN) | Movistar Team | + 2" |
| 9 | Zsófia Szabó (HUN) | Andy Schleck–CP NVST–Immo Losch | + 2" |
| 10 | Anna Henderson (GBR) | Team Jumbo–Visma | + 2" |

General classification after Stage 6
| Rank | Rider | Team | Time |
|---|---|---|---|
| 1 | Lucinda Brand (NED) | Trek–Segafredo | 17h 53' 35" |
| 2 | Lotte Kopecky (BEL) | Belgium | + 9" |
| 3 | Emma Norsgaard Jørgensen (DEN) | Movistar Team | + 18" |
| 4 | Liane Lippert (GER) | Team DSM | + 40" |
| 5 | Emilia Fahlin (SWE) | FDJ Nouvelle-Aquitaine Futuroscope | + 42" |
| 6 | Amy Pieters (NED) | SD Worx | + 50" |
| 7 | Tiffany Cromwell (AUS) | Canyon//SRAM | + 1' 03" |
| 8 | Christine Majerus (LUX) | SD Worx | + 1' 19" |
| 9 | Lizzie Deignan (GBR) | Trek–Segafredo | + 1' 26" |
| 10 | Valerie Demey (BEL) | Belgium | + 1' 28" |

== Classification leadership table ==
Classification leadership by stage
| Stage | Winner | General classification | Sprints classification | Mountains classification | Young rider classification | Most active rider award | Amateur rider classification | Team classification |
|---|---|---|---|---|---|---|---|---|
| 1 | Emma Norsgaard Jørgensen | Emma Norsgaard Jørgensen | Emma Norsgaard Jørgensen | Liane Lippert | Emma Norsgaard Jørgensen | Lizzie Deignan | Katharina Fox | Trek–Segafredo |
| 2 | Lorena Wiebes | Emma Norsgaard Jørgensen | Emma Norsgaard Jørgensen | Kathrin Hammes | Emma Norsgaard Jørgensen | Katharina Fox | Helena Bieber | Trek–Segafredo |
| 3 | Lucinda Brand | Emma Norsgaard Jørgensen | Emma Norsgaard Jørgensen | Kathrin Hammes | Emma Norsgaard Jørgensen | Katharina Fox | Helena Bieber | Trek–Segafredo |
| 4 | Lotte Kopecky | Lucinda Brand | Lotte Kopecky | Kathrin Hammes | Emma Norsgaard Jørgensen | Kristen Faulkner | Beate Zanner | Trek–Segafredo |
| 5 | Lucinda Brand | Lucinda Brand | Lucinda Brand | Kathrin Hammes | Emma Norsgaard Jørgensen | Lisa Klein | Beate Zanner | Trek–Segafredo |
| 6 | Lorena Wiebes | Lucinda Brand | Lotte Kopecky | Kathrin Hammes | Emma Norsgaard Jørgensen | Karlijn Swinkels | Beate Zanner | Trek–Segafredo |
| Final | | Lucinda Brand | Lotte Kopecky | Kathrin Hammes | Emma Norsgaard Jørgensen | Not awarded | Beate Zanner | Trek–Segafredo |

- On stage 2, Anna Henderson, who was second in the sprints classification, wore the pink jersey, because first placed Emma Norsgaard Jørgensen wore the gold jersey as the leader of the general classification. For the same reason, Lorena Wiebes, who was second in the young rider classification, wore the red jersey, and Lucinda Brand, who finished second on stage 1, wore the black-and-white stage winner's jersey.
- On stage 3, Clara Copponi, who was third in the young rider classification, wore the red jersey, because first placed Emma Norsgaard Jørgensen wore the gold jersey as the leader of the general classification, and second placed Lorena Wiebes wore the black-and-white stage winner's jersey.
- On stage 3, Katharina Fox, who was third in the sprints classification, wore the pink jersey, because first placed Emma Norsgaard Jørgensen wore the gold jersey as the leader of the general classification and second placed Lotte Kopecky wore the Belgian national champion's jersey as the defending Belgian national road race champion. Because Fox was also the most active rider, Ella Harris, who was deemed the second most active rider on that stage, wore the blue-and-white jersey.
- On stage 4, Lucinda Brand, who was third in the sprints classification, wore the pink jersey, because first placed Emma Norsgaard Jørgensen wore the gold jersey as the leader of the general classification and second placed Lotte Kopecky wore the Belgian national champion's jersey as the defending Belgian national road race champion. As a result, Amy Pieters, who finished fourth on stage 3 behind Brand, Norsgaard Jørgensen, and Kopecky, wore the black-and-white stage winner's jersey.
- On stage 4, Léa Curinier, who was second in the young rider classification, wore the red jersey, because first placed Emma Norsgaard Jørgensen wore the gold jersey as the leader of the general classification.
- On stage 5, Liane Lippert, who was third on stage 4, wore the black-and-white stage winner's jersey, because first placed Lotte Kopecky wore the pink jersey as the leader of the sprints classification, and second placed Lucinda Brand wore the gold jersey as the leader of the general classification.
- On stage 6, Lorena Wiebes, who was fourth in the sprints classification, wore the pink jersey, because first placed Lucinda Brand wore the gold jersey as the leader of the general classification, second placed Emma Norsgaard Jørgensen wore the red jersey as the leader of the young rider classification, and third placed Lotte Kopecky wore the Belgian national champion's jersey as the defending Belgian national road race champion. Because Brand was also the winner of stage 5, while Wiebes and Norsgaard Jørgensen finished second and third, respectively, Alexis Ryan, who finished fourth on stage 5, wore the black-and-white stage winner's jersey.

== Final classification standings ==
Legend
| Denotes the winner of the general classification | Denotes the winner of the most active rider award |
| Denotes the winner of the sprints classification | Denotes the winner of the stage |
| Denotes the winner of the mountains classification | Denotes the winner of the amateur rider classification |
| Denotes the winner of the young rider classification | |

=== General classification ===
Final general classification (1–10)
| Rank | Rider | Team | Time |
|---|---|---|---|
| 1 | Lucinda Brand (NED) | Trek–Segafredo | 17h 53' 35" |
| 2 | Lotte Kopecky (BEL) | Belgium | + 9" |
| 3 | Emma Norsgaard Jørgensen (DEN) | Movistar Team | + 18" |
| 4 | Liane Lippert (GER) | Team DSM | + 40" |
| 5 | Emilia Fahlin (SWE) | FDJ Nouvelle-Aquitaine Futuroscope | + 42" |
| 6 | Amy Pieters (NED) | SD Worx | + 50" |
| 7 | Tiffany Cromwell (AUS) | Canyon//SRAM | + 1' 03" |
| 8 | Christine Majerus (LUX) | SD Worx | + 1' 19" |
| 9 | Lizzie Deignan (GBR) | Trek–Segafredo | + 1' 26" |
| 10 | Valerie Demey (BEL) | Belgium | + 1' 28" |

=== Sprints classification ===
Final sprints classification (1–10)
| Rank | Rider | Team | Points |
|---|---|---|---|
| 1 | Lotte Kopecky (BEL) | Belgium | 22 |
| 2 | Lucinda Brand (NED) | Trek–Segafredo | 19 |
| 3 | Emma Norsgaard Jørgensen (DEN) | Movistar Team | 19 |
| 4 | Lorena Wiebes (NED) | Team DSM | 15 |
| 5 | Amy Pieters (NED) | SD Worx | 9 |
| 6 | Emilia Fahlin (SWE) | FDJ Nouvelle-Aquitaine Futuroscope | 8 |
| 7 | Katharina Fox (GER) | RSG Gießen Biehle | 6 |
| 8 | Anna Henderson (GBR) | Team Jumbo–Visma | 6 |
| 9 | Lizzie Deignan (GBR) | Trek–Segafredo | 5 |
| 10 | Lisa Klein (GER) | Canyon//SRAM | 5 |

=== Mountains classification ===
Final mountains classification (1–10)
| Rank | Rider | Team | Points |
|---|---|---|---|
| 1 | Kathrin Hammes (GER) | Ceratizit–WNT Pro Cycling | 26 |
| 2 | Liane Lippert (GER) | Team DSM | 16 |
| 3 | Ella Harris (NZL) | Canyon//SRAM | 12 |
| 4 | Amy Pieters (NED) | SD Worx | 11 |
| 5 | Lisa Klein (GER) | Canyon//SRAM | 10 |
| 6 | Helena Bieber (GER) | RSG Gießen Biehle | 10 |
| 7 | Chantal van den Broek-Blaak (NED) | SD Worx | 8 |
| 8 | Kirsten Wild (NED) | Ceratizit–WNT Pro Cycling | 6 |
| 9 | Lucinda Brand (NED) | Trek–Segafredo | 5 |
| 10 | Lizzie Deignan (GBR) | Trek–Segafredo | 5 |

=== Young rider classification ===
Final young rider classification (1–10)
| Rank | Rider | Team | Time |
|---|---|---|---|
| 1 | Emma Norsgaard Jørgensen (DEN) | Movistar Team | 17h 53' 53" |
| 2 | Léa Curinier (FRA) | Arkéa Pro Cycling Team | + 2' 24" |
| 3 | Hannah Ludwig (GER) | Canyon//SRAM | + 3' 30" |
| 4 | Neve Bradbury (AUS) | Canyon//SRAM | + 7' 02" |
| 5 | Anne Dorthe Ysland (NOR) | Team Coop–Hitec Products | + 7' 26" |
| 6 | Lorena Wiebes (NED) | Team DSM | + 7' 55" |
| 7 | Clara Copponi (FRA) | FDJ Nouvelle-Aquitaine Futuroscope | + 9' 57" |
| 8 | Pfeiffer Georgi (GBR) | Team DSM | + 10' 25" |
| 9 | Lonneke Uneken (NED) | SD Worx | + 11' 33" |
| 10 | Katharina Hechler (GER) | Germany | + 14' 38" |

=== Amateur rider classification ===
Final amateur rider classification (1–6)
| Rank | Rider | Team | Time |
|---|---|---|---|
| 1 | Beate Zanner (GER) | Maxx–Solar Lindig | 18h 18' 30" |
| 2 | Helena Bieber (GER) | RSG Gießen Biehle | + 12' 41" |
| 3 | Katharina Fox (GER) | RSG Gießen Biehle | + 29' 08" |
| 4 | Lisa Fischer (GER) | Maxx–Solar Lindig | + 33' 52" |
| 5 | Hannah Fandel (GER) | Maxx–Solar Lindig | + 34' 48" |
| 6 | Bianca Bernhard (GER) | Maxx–Solar Lindig | + 48' 43" |

=== Team classification ===
Final team classification (1–10)
| Rank | Team | Time |
|---|---|---|
| 1 | Trek–Segafredo | 53h 46' 18" |
| 2 | SD Worx | + 1' 16" |
| 3 | Canyon//SRAM | + 1' 18" |
| 4 | Belgium | + 5' 35" |
| 5 | Team DSM | + 7' 34" |
| 6 | FDJ Nouvelle-Aquitaine Futuroscope | + 7' 51" |
| 7 | Arkéa Pro Cycling Team | + 9' 08" |
| 8 | Ceratizit–WNT Pro Cycling | + 9' 29" |
| 9 | Movistar Team | + 18' 50" |
| 10 | Team Coop–Hitec Products | + 21' 14" |

== See also ==
- 2021 in women's road cycling
