= Hannah Ludwig =

German cyclist (born 2000)

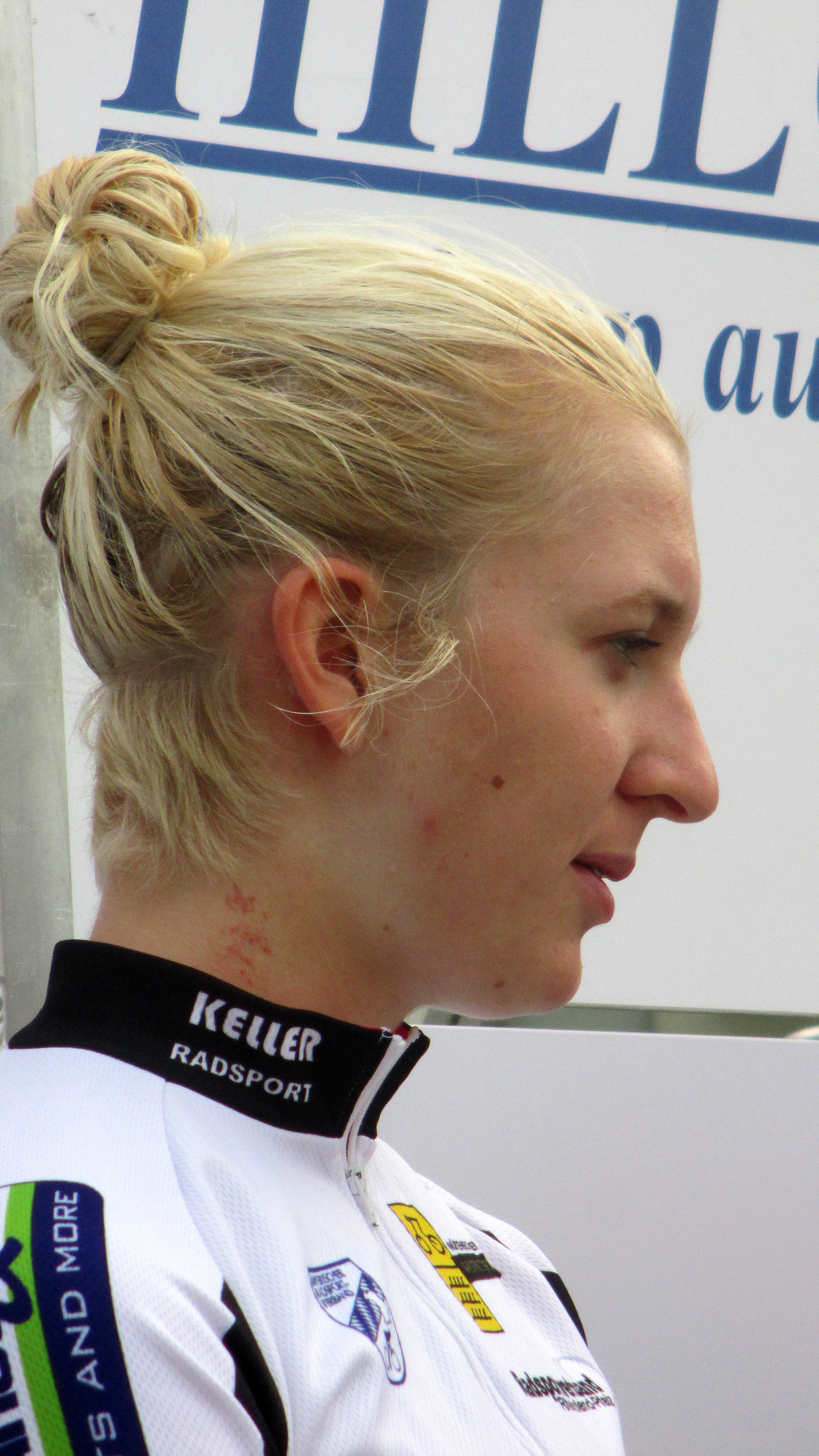
- Ludwig in 2018

Personal information
- Full name: Hannah Ludwig
- Born: 15 February 2000 (age 26)

Cycling career
- Sport: Cycling
- Current team: Canyon//SRAM
- Discipline: Road
- Role: Rider

Amateur team
- 2013–2018: RSC Stahlroß Wittlich

Professional teams
- 2019–21: Canyon//SRAM
- 2022–23: Uno-X Pro Cycling Team
- 2024–: Cofidis

Hannah Ludwig (born 15 February 2000) is a German professional racing cyclist, who currently rides for UCI Women's Continental Team Cofidis. In 2024, Ludwig took her first major win at the Clasica Femenina Navarra.

== Major results ==
2017
2nd Time trial, National Junior Road Championships
4th Time trial, UCI World Junior Road Championships
5th Time trial, UEC European Junior Road Championships
10th Overall Healthy Ageing Tour Juniors
2018
1st Time trial, National Junior Road Championships
UEC European Junior Road Championships

2nd Time trial
3rd Road race

3rd Overall EPZ Omloop van Borsele
10th Time trial, UCI WorldJunior Road Championships
2019
1st Time trial, UEC European Under–23 Road Championships
4th Time trial, National Road Championships
6th Overall BeNe Ladies Tour

1st Young rider classification

2020
1st Time trial, UEC European Under–23 Road Championships
9th Trophée des Grimpeuses
2021
2nd Time trial, UEC European Under–23 Road Championships
6th Overall Baloise Ladies Tour
6th Overall Setmana Ciclista Valenciana
2024
1st Clasica Femenina Navarra
10th Overall Tour Féminin International des Pyrénées

=== General classification results timeline ===
Major Tour results timeline
Stage race	2019	2020	2021	2022	2023	2024
La Vuelta Femenina (Note: Known as the Challenge by La Vuelta from 2020 to 2022)	—	13	26	58	—	—
Giro d'Italia Femminile	—	—	—	DNF	49	45
Tour de France Femmes	Race did not exist			106	71	23
Stage race results timeline
Stage race	2019	2020	2021	2022	2023	2024
Grand Prix Elsy Jacobs	—	NH	37	28	21	NH
Tour de Normandie Féminin	Race did not exist				—	47
Bretagne Ladies Tour	—	Not held		—	—	11
RideLondon Classique	—	Not held		—	—	—
Itzulia Women	Not held			—	—	51
UAE Tour	Not held				14	12
Tour of Scandinavia	—	NH	—	—	30	NH
Tour of Britain Women	—	NH	—	57	NH	—

==== Classics results timeline ====
Monuments results timeline
Monument	2019	2020	2021	2022	2023	2024
Tour of Flanders	—	—	—	—	—	—
Paris–Roubaix	DNE		—	—	—	—
Liège–Bastogne–Liège	91	48	—	45	92	DNF
Classics results timeline
Classic	2019	2020	2021	2022	2023	2024
Omloop Het Nieuwsblad	—	DNF	—	—	—	—
Strade Bianche	OTL	—	—	DNF	—	—
Ronde van Drenthe	—	—	41	—	—	—
Nokere Koerse	—	NH	DNF	73	76	—
Classic Brugge–De Panne	—	52	91	63	—	—
Trofeo Alfredo Binda	—	—	—	—	—	—
Gent–Wevelgem	—	—	—	DNF	—	—
Amstel Gold Race	—	—	—	47	61	79
La Flèche Wallonne	72	—	—	46	60	44
Cadel Evans Great Ocean Road Race	—	32	NH		—	—
Tour of Guangxi	28	NH			—	
GP de Plouay	43	—	DNF	—	86	

==== Major championship results timeline ====
Event		2019	2020	2021	2022	2023	2024
Olympic Games	Time trial	NH		—	Not held		—
Olympic Games	Road race	NH		41	Not held		—
World Championships	Time trial	—	—	—	—	—	
World Championships	Road race	—	—	—	—	—	
World Championships	Mixed team relay	—	NH	—	—	—	
European Championships	Time trial	—	—	—	—	—	
European Championships	Road race	—	—	—	—	69	
European Championships	Mixed team relay	—	—	NH	—	—	
National Championships	Time trial	4	NH	3	3	9	10
National Championships	Road race	12	NH	5	11	9	6

Legend
—	Did not compete
DNF	Did not finish
NH	Not held
