= 2024 Dwars door Vlaanderen for Women =

Cycling race

2024 UCI Women's ProSeries
- Event poster with previous winners Christophe Laporte and Demi Vollering

Race details
- Dates: 27 March 2024
- Stages: 1
- Distance: 114 km (71 mi)
- Winning time: 2h 52' 08"

Results
	Winner	Marianne Vos (NED)	(Visma–Lease a Bike)
	Second	Shirin van Anrooij (NED)	(Lidl–Trek)
	Third	Letizia Paternoster (ITA)	(Liv AlUla Jayco)

The 2024 Dwars door Vlaanderen for Women was a road cycling one-day race that took place on 27 March 2024 in Belgium. It was the 12th edition of the women's race of Dwars door Vlaanderen. The race was won by Dutch rider Marianne Vos of Visma–Lease a Bike.

== Teams ==
Fourteen UCI Women's WorldTeams and ten UCI Women's Continental Teams took part in the race.

UCI Women's WorldTeams

- AG Insurance–Soudal
- Ceratizit–WNT Pro Cycling
- FDJ–Suez
- Fenix–Deceuninck
- Human Powered Health
- Lidl–Trek
- Liv AlUla Jayco
- Movistar Team
- Roland
- Team dsm–firmenich PostNL
- Team SD Worx–Protime
- UAE Team ADQ
- Uno-X Mobility
- Visma–Lease a Bike

UCI Women's Continental Teams

- Arkéa–B&B Hotels Women
- St. Michel–Mavic–Auber93
- Bepink–Bongioanni
- Chevalmeire
- Cofidis
- Lifeplus Wahoo
- Lotto–Dstny Ladies
- Proximus-Cyclis CT
- Team Coop–Repsol
- VolkerWessels Women Cyclingteam

== Results ==
Result
Rank	Rider	Team	Time
1	Marianne Vos (NED)	Visma–Lease a Bike	2h 52' 08"
2	Shirin van Anrooij (NED)	Lidl–Trek	+ 0"
3	Letizia Paternoster (ITA)	Liv AlUla Jayco	+ 19"
4	Lotte Kopecky (BEL)	Team SD Worx–Protime	+ 19"
5	Puck Pieterse (NED)	Fenix–Deceuninck	+ 19"
6	Elisa Longo Borghini (ITA)	Lidl–Trek	+ 19"
7	Chiara Consonni (ITA)	UAE Team ADQ	+ 51"
8	Arlenis Sierra (CUB)	Movistar Team	+ 51"
9	Lucinda Brand (NED)	Lidl–Trek	+ 51"
10	Julie De Wilde (BEL)	Fenix–Deceuninck	+ 51"
