= GP Lucien Van Impe =

Women's cycling race in Belgium

Race details
- Date: August
- Region: Belgium
- Discipline: Road
- Competition: UCI Women's ProSeries
- Type: One-day race
- Web site: gplucienvanimpe.be

History
- First edition: 2023
- Editions: 4 (as of 2026)
- First winner: Katrijn De Clercq (BEL)
- Most wins: No repeat winners
- Most recent: Charlotte Kool (NED)

The GP Lucien Van Impe is a one-day road cycling race held annually in Erpe-Mere, Belgium. It was first held in 2023 as a local race before being classified by the Union Cycliste Internationale (UCI) as a 1.2 race in 2024 and 1.1 race in 2025. In 2026, the race was promoted to the UCI Women's ProSeries.

The race is named for Lucien Van Impe, the winner of the 1976 Tour de France and a significant figure in the region. The race course typically features both short steep hills and a flat finish, giving opportunities for a variety of riders.

== Winners ==
Year	Country	Rider	Team
2023	Belgium	Katrijn De Clercq	Lotto–Dstny Ladies
2024	Netherlands	Evy Kuijpers	Fenix–Deceuninck
2025	Netherlands	Lorena Wiebes	Team SD Worx–Protime
2025	Netherlands	Charlotte Kool	Fenix–Premier Tech
