= MerXem Classic =

Race details
- Date: August
- Region: Belgium
- Discipline: Road
- Web site: www.karakterkoersen.be

History
- First edition: 2019
- Editions: 2 (as of 2022)
- First winner: Lotte Kopecky (BEL)
- Most recent: Eleonora Gasparrini (ITA)

MerXem Classic is an elite women's professional one-day road bicycle race held in Belgium; as of 2022 it is rated by the UCI as a 1.1 race.

The race was annulled in 2020 and 2021 due to COVID-19.

== Past winners ==
Year	Country	Rider	Team
2018	Netherlands	Lorena Wiebes	Parkhotel Valkenburg
2019	Belgium	Lotte Kopecky	Lotto–Soudal Ladies
2020	No race due to COVID-19 pandemic		
2021	No race due to COVID-19 pandemic		
2022	Italy	Eleonora Gasparrini	Valcar–Travel & Service
