= Surf Coast Classic =

Australian one-day road cycling race

Race details
- Date: Late January
- Discipline: Road
- Competition: UCI Oceania Tour (2020–25); UCI ProSeries (2026–); UCI Women's ProSeries
- Type: one-day
- Web site: cadelevansgreatoceanroadrace.com.au/mens-surf-coast-classic/overview/

History (men)
- First edition: 2020
- Editions: 3 (as of 2026)
- First winner: Sam Bennett (IRL)
- Most wins: No repeat winners
- Most recent: Tobias Lund Andresen (DEN)

History (women)
- First edition: 2020
- Editions: 3
- First winner: Brodie Chapman (AUS)
- Most wins: No repeat winners
- Most recent: Ally Wollaston (NZL)

Surf Coast Classic is a one-day cycling race held in Australia since 2020 initially called Race Torquay. The race is held a few days before the Cadel Evans Great Ocean Road Race. The men's race was rated as a 1.1 event on the UCI Oceania Tour, before being upgraded to 1.Pro event. In 2024 the race was renamed as the Geelong Classic for Women and Surf Coast Classic for men.

In 2026, the men's race and women's race moved to the UCI ProSeries and UCIWomen's ProSeries respectively. The 2026 races were cancelled at the last minute, owing to a high risk of bushfires.

== Winners ==
=== Men's race ===
Year	Country	Rider	Team
2020	Ireland	Sam Bennett	Deceuninck–Quick-Step
2021	No race due to COVID-19 pandemic in Australia		
2022	No race due to COVID-19 pandemic in Australia		
2023	No race due to clash with Australia Day		
2024	Eritrea	Biniam Girmay	Intermarché–Wanty
2025	Denmark	Tobias Lund Andresen	Team Picnic–PostNL
2026	No race due to risk of Bushfires		

=== Women's race ===
Year	Country	Rider	Team
2020	Australia	Brodie Chapman	FDJ Nouvelle-Aquitaine Futuroscope
2021	No race due to COVID-19 pandemic in Australia		
2022	No race due to COVID-19 pandemic in Australia		
2023	No race due to clash with Australia Day		
2024	Italy	Sofia Bertizzolo	UAE Team ADQ
2025	New Zealand	Ally Wollaston	FDJ–Suez
2026	No race due to risk of Bushfires		
