= Marta Lach =

Polish cyclist (born 1997)

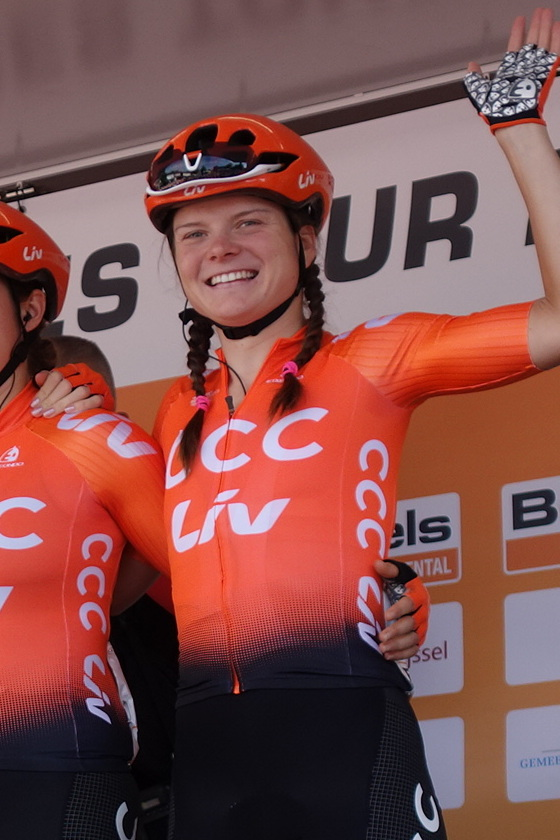
- Marta Lach at the 2019 Holland Ladies Tour

Personal information
- Full name: Marta Lach
- Born: 26 May 1997 (age 29)

Cycling career
- Sport: Cycling
- Current team: Team SD Worx–Protime
- Discipline: Road
- Role: Rider
- Rider type: All rounder

Professional teams
- 2019–2020: CCC - Liv
- 2021–2024: Ceratizit–WNT Pro Cycling
- 2025–: Team SD Worx–Protime

Marta Lach (born 26 May 1997) is a Polish professional racing cyclist, who currently rides for UCI Women's WorldTeam Team SD Worx–Protime.

In 2020, she become Polish National Road Race Champion. In 2021, Lach joined Ceratizit–WNT Pro Cycling. In 2024, Lach won her first UCI Women's World Tour event, the Tour of Chongming Island. In 2025, Lach joined Team SD Worx–Protime, having signed a three year deal with the team.

== Personal life ==
She comes from Głębowice and she is studying in University School of Physical Education in Kraków. She has a younger brother, Michał, who is an amateur cyclist.

== Major results ==
2014
1st Road race, National Junior Road Championships
2017
4th SwissEver GP Cham-Hagendorn
2019
1st Stage 1 Festival Elsy Jacobs
2nd Road race, UEC European Under-23 Road Championships
National Road Championships

2nd Road race
5th Under-23 time trial

3rd Clasica Femenina Navarra
10th Brabantse Pijl
2020
1st Road race, National Road Championships
7th GP de Plouay-Lorient
2021
1st La Picto–Charentaise
4th La Périgord Ladies
5th Time trial, National Road Championships
9th Grand Prix International d'Isbergues
2022
1st Stage 3 Tour de Romandie
2nd Time trial, National Road Championships
2nd Overall Thüringen Ladies Tour
2nd Trofeo Oro in Euro
10th Overall Bretagne Ladies Tour

1st Stage 5

2023
1st Grand Prix de Wallonie
1st La Choralis Fourmies Féminine
2nd Time trial, National Road Championships
2nd Classic Lorient Agglomération
4th À travers les Hauts-de-France
6th Paris–Roubaix
6th Overall Thüringen Ladies Tour
6th Tour of Guangxi
8th Overall Bretagne Ladies Tour

1st Mountains classification
1st Stage 1

9th Danilith Nokere Koerse
Combativity award Stage 1 Tour de France
2024
1st Festival Elsy Jacobs Luxembourg
1st Festival Elsy Jacobs Garnich
1st Overall Tour of Chongming Island

1st Points classification
1st Stages 2 & 3

National Road Championships

2nd Time trial
4th Road race

2nd La Classique Morbihan
3rd Grand Prix du Morbihan Féminin
3rd Tour of Guangxi
4th Trofeo Palma Femina
5th Overall Thüringen Ladies Tour
5th Grand Prix Stuttgart & Region
10th Road race, Olympic Games
2025
1st Mountains Classification Tour de Suisse
1st Nokere Koerse
1st Festival Elsy Jacobs Garnich
