= Valerie Demey =

Belgian cyclist (born 1994)

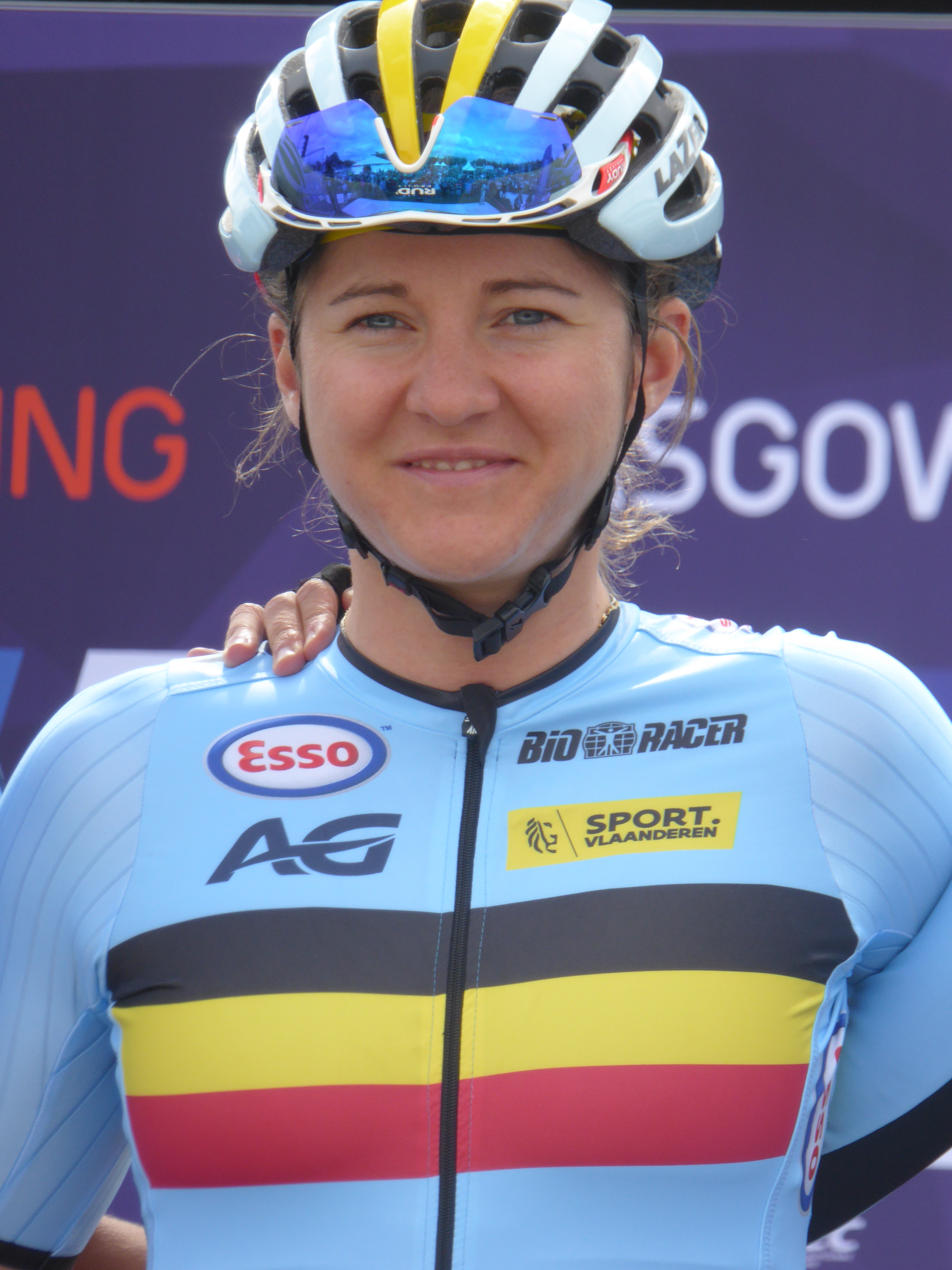
- Demey at the 2018 European Road Cycling Championships.

Personal information
- Full name: Valerie Demey
- Born: 17 January 1994 (age 32) Bruges, Belgium

Cycling career
- Sport: Cycling
- Discipline: Road
- Role: Rider

Professional teams
- 2016–2017: Sport Vlaanderen–Guill D'or
- 2018: Lotto–Soudal Ladies
- 2019–2023: Liv Racing TeqFind
- 2024–2025: VolkerWessels Women Cyclingteam

Managerial team
- 2026: Fenix–Premier Tech

Valerie Demey (born 17 January 1994) is a Belgian professional racing cyclist, who last rode for UCI Women's WorldTeam VolkerWessels Women Cyclingteam. She was among the many openly LGBT athletes who competed at the 2020 Summer Olympics. Since 2026, she has been an assistant sports director at Fenix–Premier Tech.

== Major results ==
2016
10th Erondegemse Pijl
2017
4th Dwars door de Westhoek
6th Flanders Diamond Tour
6th Time trial, National Road Championships
2018
2nd Road race, National Road Championships
9th Grand Prix International d'Isbergues
9th Overall Omloop van het Hageland
2019
8th Postnord UCI WWT Vårgårda West Sweden TTT
9th Mixed team relay, Road World Championships
2020
6th Grote Prijs Euromat
8th Time trial, National Road Championships
2021
7th Omloop van de Westhoek
9th Dwars door de Westhoek
10th Overall Thüringen Ladies Tour
2022
8th Omloop van het Hageland

== See also ==
- List of 2016 UCI Women's Teams and riders
