= La Choralis Fourmies Féminine =

Race details
- Date: September
- Region: Fourmies, France
- Discipline: Road
- Competition: UCI Women's ProSeries
- Type: One-day race
- Web site: grandprixdefourmies.com

History
- First edition: 2019
- Editions: 6 (as of 2026)
- First winner: Nguyễn Thị Thật (VIE)
- Most wins: Lorena Wiebes (NED) (2 wins)
- Most recent: Lorena Wiebes (NED)

La Choralis Fourmies Féminine is an annual, professional women's one-day cycling race in Fourmies, France. It was first held in 2019 as a category 1.2 race, before upgrading to 1.1 status in 2024, and then joining the UCI Women's ProSeries for 2025. The race is one of several late season races that are held in France.

== Winners ==
Year	Country	Rider	Team
2019	Vietnam	Thị Thật Nguyễn	Lotto–Soudal Ladies
2020	No race		
2021	Great Britain	Pfeiffer Georgi	Team DSM
2022	France	Clara Copponi	FDJ Suez Futuroscope
2023	Poland	Marta Lach	Ceratizit–WNT Pro Cycling
2024	Italy	Silvia Zanardi	Human Powered Health
2025	Netherlands	Lorena Wiebes	Team SD Worx–Protime
2026	Netherlands	Lorena Wiebes	Team SD Worx–Protime
