= Pointe du Raz Ladies Classic =

Women's cycling race in France

Race details
- Date: May
- Region: France
- Local name: Pointe du Raz Ladies Classic (French)
- Discipline: Road
- Type: One-day race
- Web site: pointeduraz-ladiesclassic.bzh/en/accueil-english/

History
- First edition: 2025
- Editions: 2 (as of 2026)
- First winner: Paula Blasi (SPA)
- Most wins: No repeat winners
- Most recent: Nina Berton (LUX)

The Pointe du Raz Ladies Classic is a one-day road cycling race held annually in France. It was first held in 2023 as a local race, before elevation to a 1.1 classification by the Union Cycliste Internationale in 2025, then joining the UCI Women's ProSeries in 2026.

The first professional edition took place on a 143 kilometres (89 mi) course, with 88 kilometres (55 mi) of off-road gravel sectors. Spanish rider Paula Blasi won with a solo attack in the final kilometers. The following year, Nina Berton out-sprinted Blasi after catching her and Celia Gery in the final 50 metres (160 ft).

== Winners ==
Year	Country	Rider	Team
2025	Spain	Paula Blasi	UAE Team ADQ
2026	Luxembourg	Nina Berton	EF Education–Oatly
