= 2021 Ronde van Drenthe (women's race) =

2021 UCI Women's World Tour, race 18 of 18
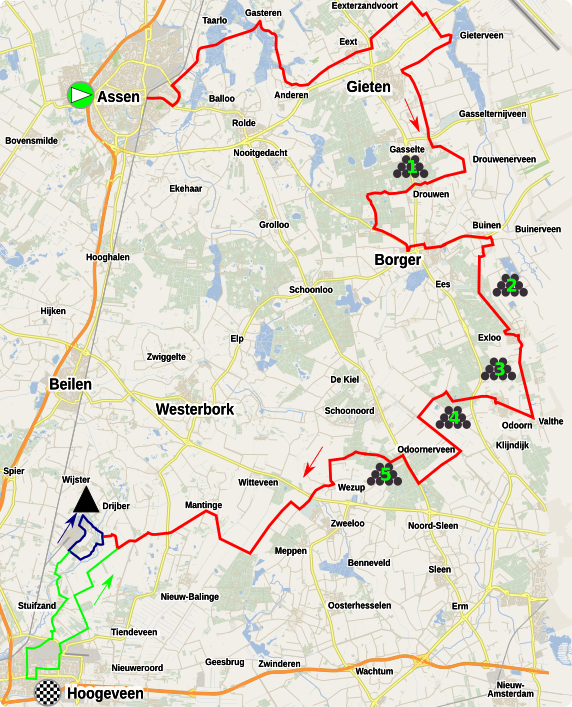

Race details
- Dates: 23 October 2021
- Stages: 1
- Distance: 159.1 km (98.86 mi)

Results
	Winner	Lorena Wiebes (NED)	(Team DSM)
	Second	Elena Cecchini (ITA)	(SD Worx)
	Third	Eleonora Gasparrini (ITA)	(Valcar–Travel & Service)

The 14th edition of the Ronde van Drenthe, a women's cycling race in the Netherlands, was held on 23 October 2021. The race was won by Dutch rider Lorena Wiebes of Team DSM in a sprint finish.

== Result ==
Result
Rank	Rider	Team	Time
1	Lorena Wiebes (NED)	Team DSM	4h 03' 31"
2	Elena Cecchini (ITA)	SD Worx	+ 0"
3	Eleonora Gasparrini (ITA)	Valcar–Travel & Service	+ 0"
4	Elise Chabbey (SUI)	Canyon–SRAM	+ 0"
5	Floortje Mackaij (NED)	Team DSM	+ 0"
6	Pfeiffer Georgi (GBR)	Team DSM	+ 0"
7	Chiara Consonni (ITA)	Team DSM	+ 6"
8	Franziska Koch (GER)	Team DSM	+1' 15"
9	Chiara Consonni (ITA)	Valcar–Travel & Service	+1' 15"
10	Nina Kessler (NED)	Tibco–Silicon Valley Bank	+1' 15"
