= GP Oetingen =

Belgian one-day road cycling race

Race details
- Date: March
- Region: Pajottenland, Belgium
- Discipline: Road
- Competition: 1.1 (2021–2024); UCI Women's ProSeries (2025–)
- Web site: www.gooiksportief.be

History
- First edition: 2021
- Editions: 5 (as of 2025)
- First winner: Elisa Balsamo (ITA)
- Most wins: Lorena Wiebes (NED) (3 wins)
- Most recent: Lorena Wiebes (NED)

The GP Oetingen is an elite women's professional one-day road bicycle race held annually in the Pajottenland region of Belgium. The event was first held in 2022, and is part of the UCI Women's ProSeries. The 2023 edition was postponed until August due to snowfall.

== Past winners ==
Year	Country	Rider	Team
2021	Italy	Elisa Balsamo	Valcar–Travel & Service
2022	Netherlands	Lorena Wiebes	Team DSM
2023	Canada	Simone Boilard	St. Michel–Mavic–Auber93
2024	Netherlands	Lorena Wiebes	Team SD Worx–Protime
2025	Belgium	Julie De Wilde	Fenix–Deceuninck
2026	Netherlands	Lorena Wiebes	Team SD Worx–Protime
