= Women's Tour Down Under One Day Race =

Australian one-day road cycling race

Race details
- Date: January
- Region: Adelaide, Australia
- Discipline: Road
- Competition: UCI Women's ProSeries (2025-present)
- Type: One-day race
- Organiser: Events South Australia
- Web site: tourdownunder.com.au

History
- First edition: 2023
- Editions: 4
- First winner: Ally Wollaston (NZL)
- Most wins: No repeat winners
- Most recent: Maggie Coles-Lyster (CAN)

The Women’s Tour Down Under One Day Race is a women's professional one-day road bicycle race held annually in Adelaide, Australia. The event first took place in 2023 as the Women's Down Under Criterium, albeit outside of the UCI calendar. In 2025, the race joined the UCI Women's ProSeries, as the Women's One Day Classic.

In 2026, the race rebranded as Women’s Tour Down Under One Day Race, as it is organised by the same group as the Women's Tour Down Under.

== Past winners ==
Year	Country	Rider	Team
2023	New Zealand	Ally Wollaston	AG Insurance–Soudal–Quick-Step
2024	Netherlands	Nienke Veenhoven	Visma–Lease a Bike
2025	France	Clara Copponi	Lidl–Trek
2026	Canada	Maggie Coles-Lyster	Human Powered Health
