= Eleonora Gasparrini =

Italian cyclist (born 2002)

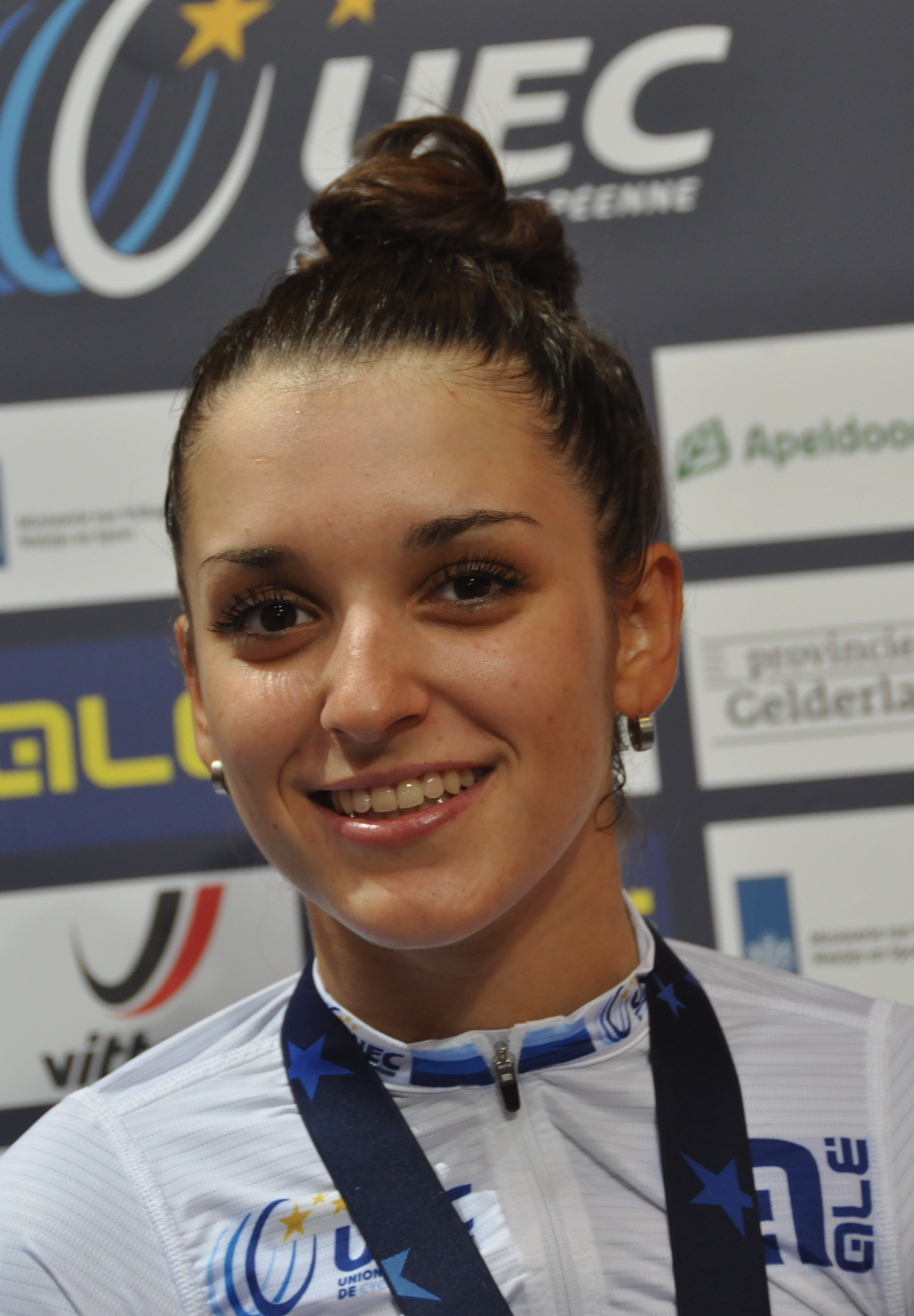
- Gasparrini in 2021

Personal information
- Full name: Eleonora Camilla Gasparrini
- Born: 25 March 2002 (age 24) Turin, Italy
- Height: 1.66 m (5 ft 5 in)

Cycling career
- Sport: Cycling
- Current team: UAE Team L'Imad
- Disciplines: Road, Track
- Role: Rider

Professional teams
- 2021–2022: Valcar–Travel & Service
- 2023–: UAE Team ADQ
Medal record
Women's road bicycle racing
Representing Italy
European Championships
Bronze medal – third place	2024 Limburg	Under-23 road race

Eleonora Camilla Gasparrini (born 25 March 2002) is an Italian professional track and road cyclist, who currently rides for UCI Women's World Team UAE Team L'Imad.

Gasparrini won the junior road race at the 2020 European Road Championships. At elite level, she had a podium finish in the 2021 Ronde van Drenthe. Gasparrini also rode in the 2022 Tour de France Femmes.

As a track cyclist, she won the team pursuit event at the 2021 and 2022 European Under-23 Track Championships.

== Major results ==
=== Road ===
2019
National Junior Championships

1st Road race
1st Time trial

2020
1st Road race, UEC European Junior Championships
2021
3rd Ronde van Drenthe
3rd Drentse 8 van Westerveld
5th Grand Prix du Morbihan Féminin
7th Tre Valli Varesine
2022
1st MerXem Classic
3rd Overall Tour de la Semois
4th Ronde de Mouscron
5th Road race, National Championships
9th GP Eco-Struct
2023
1st Stage 2 Tour de Suisse
4th Overall RideLondon Classique

1st Young rider classification

4th Clasica Femenina Navarra
6th Dwars door het Hageland
7th Overall Setmana Ciclista Valenciana

1st Young rider classification

9th Road race, UEC European Under-23 Championships
2024
1st Grand Prix Stuttgart & Region
1st La Classique Morbihan
1st Trofeo Binissalem-Andratx
3rd Road race, UEC European Under-23 Championships
3rd Road race, National Championships
3rd Gran Premio della Liberazione
4th Tre Valli Varesine
6th Amstel Gold Race
6th Classic Lorient Agglomération
7th Grand Prix du Morbihan Féminin
8th Overall RideLondon Classique

1st Young rider classification

10th Tour of Guangxi
2025
1st Grand Prix du Morbihan Féminin
4th Tre Valli Varesine
6th Omloop Het Nieuwsblad
8th Trofeo Palma Femina
10th Trofeo Binissalem-Andratx
2026
1st Tre Valli Varesine
3rd Milan–San Remo Women
