= Thüringen Women Cycling Challenge =

Women's road bike race in Thuringia, Germany

Lotto Thüringen Women Cycling Challenge
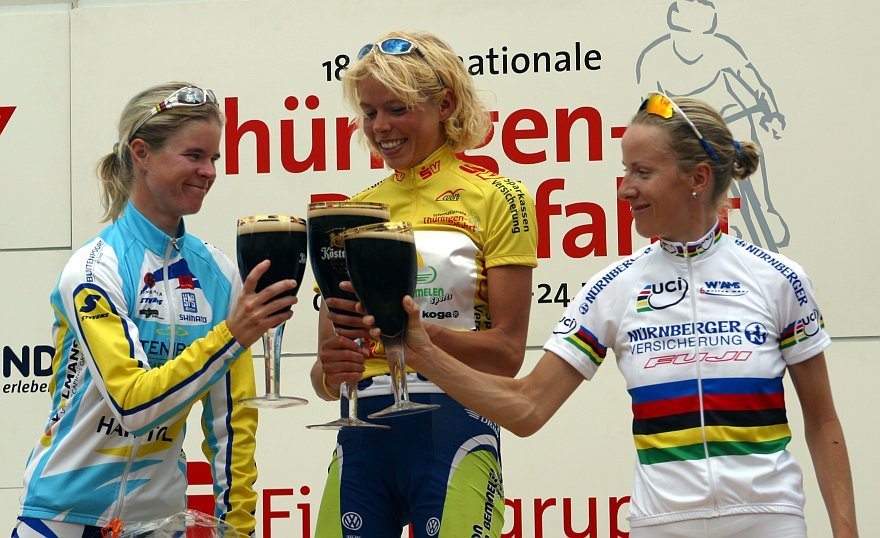
- Podium of the 2005 event: Susanne Ljungskog, Theresa Senff and Judith Arndt

Race details
- Date: Mid-July
- Region: Thuringia, Germany
- Discipline: Road
- Competition: UCI Women's ProSeries
- Type: One-day race
- Organiser: TRF Thüringer Sportmarketing GmbH
- Race director: Vera Hohlfeld
- Web site: www.thueringenrundfahrt-frauen.de

History
- First edition: 1986
- Editions: 37 (as of 2026)
- First winner: Hanna Chmelarova (CSK)
- Most wins: Judith Arndt (GER); Emma Johansson (SWE) (3 wins)
- Most recent: Marit Raaijmakers (NED)

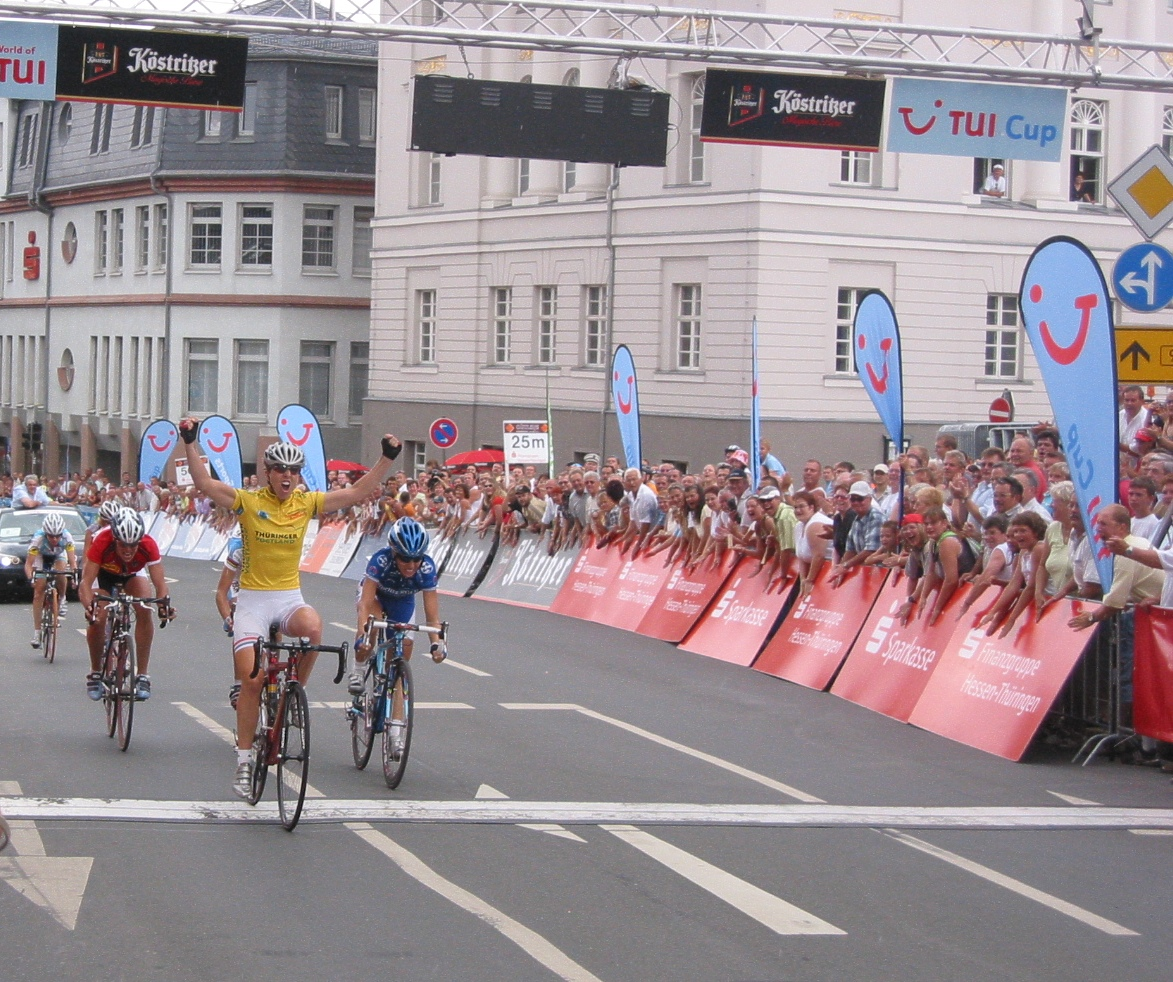
Nicole Cooke secured the overall title in 2006 by winning the final stage in Zeulenroda-Triebes

The Lotto Thüringen Women Cycling Challenge is a one-day women's cycling race held every July in the German state of Thuringia. The race is part of the UCI Women's ProSeries. The title sponsor is LOTTO Thüringen, the state lottery of Thuringia.

From 1986 until 2024, the Thüringen Rundfahrt der Frauen or Thüringen Ladies Tour women's stage race was held every July. It was rated a class 2.Pro event by the Union Cycliste Internationale (UCI), before joining the UCI Women's ProSeries in 2021. Following a loss of sponsorship and withdrawal of state funding, the 2025 edition of the race was cancelled.

== History ==
=== Stage race (Thüringen Rundfahrt der Frauen) ===
A stage race was first held in 1986 in what was then East Germany, and was consistently held from 1992 – with only the 2020 event cancelled owing to the COVID-19 pandemic. Organisers noted their desire to be part of the UCI Women's World Tour in future, and provided live television coverage of the event from 2022.

In March 2025, organisers announced that the 2025 edition of the race had been cancelled after €200,000 in funding from the Thuringia state government was stopped. In May 2025, organisers noted that the stage race would not return, citing "irreparable damage to trust with state authorities" and a loss of sponsorship.

=== One-day race (Thüringen Women Cycling Challenge) ===
In 2026, organisers announced they would hold a one-day race in the city of Gera in Thuringia in July 2026. The 123 kilometres (76 mi) long course included six laps of a finishing circuit that included a 1.6 km (0.99 mi) climb with an average gradient of 6.2%. Organisers also noted they wished to expand the race to multiple stages in future.

== Winners ==
=== Stage race ===
Year	Distance (km)	Stages	Winner
1986	210		Hanna Chmelarova (CSK)
1987	295		Petra Roßner (GDR)
1988	398		Tea Vikstedt-Nyman (FIN)
1989	410		Vanessa van Dijk (NED)
1990–1991	Event not held		
1992	374		Alena Barillova (CSK)
1993	335		Lenka Ilavská (SVK)
1994	394		Alison Dunlap (USA)
1995	406		Laura Charameda (USA)
1996	465		Ina-Yoko Teutenberg (GER)
1997	553		Alessandra Cappellotto (ITA)
1998	523		Edita Pučinskaitė (LIT)
1999	664		Hanka Kupfernagel (GER)
2000	618		Valentyna Karpenko (UKR)
2001	634		Mirjam Melchers (NED)
2002	634		Zoulfia Zabirova (RUS)
2003	566		Valentina Polkhanova (RUS)
2004	588	6	Zoulfia Zabirova (RUS)
2005	583	6	Theresa Senff (GER)
2006	594	6	Nicole Cooke (GBR)
2007	593	6	Judith Arndt (GER)
2008	553	6	Judith Arndt (GER)
2009	587	6	Linda Villumsen (DEN)
2010	615	6	Olga Zabelinskaya (RUS)
2011	590	7	Emma Johansson (SWE)
2012	578	6	Judith Arndt (GER)
2013	633	7	Emma Johansson (SWE)
2014	595	6	Evelyn Stevens (USA)
2015	595	7	Emma Johansson (SWE)
2016	672.6	7	Elena Cecchini (ITA)
2017	553.9	6	Lisa Brennauer (GER)
2018	559.8	7	Lisa Brennauer (GER)
2019	545.7	6	Kathrin Hammes (GER)
2020	No race due to COVID-19 pandemic		
2021	672.6	6	Lucinda Brand (NED)
2022	695.8	6	Alexandra Manly (AUS)
2023	695.8	6	Lotte Kopecky (BEL)
2024	630.6	6	Ruth Winder (USA)
2025	Race cancelled		

=== One day race ===
Year	Rider	Team
2026	Marit Raaijmakers (NED)	Human Powered Health
