= Grand Prix Stuttgart & Region =

German one-day road cycling race

Women's Cycling Grand Prix Stuttgart & Region
Race details
- Date: September
- Region: Baden-Wuerttemberg, Germany
- Discipline: Road
- Competition: UCI Women's ProSeries
- Type: One-day race
- Web site: www.stuttgart.wcgp.de

History
- First edition: 2023
- Editions: 4 (as of 2026)
- First winner: Elena Pirrone (ITA)
- Most wins: Eleonora Gasparrini (ITA) (2 wins)
- Most recent: Dominika Włodarczyk (POL)

The Women's Cycling Grand Prix Stuttgart & Region is an elite women's professional one-day road bicycle race held annually in Baden-Wuerttemberg, Germany. The race first took place in 2023 as a UCI category 1.2 race, before joining the UCI Women's ProSeries in 2024.

== Past winners ==
Year	Country	Rider	Team
2023	Italy	Elena Pirrone	Israel Premier Tech Roland
2024	Italy	Eleonora Gasparrini	UAE Team ADQ
2025	Italy	Eleonora Gasparrini	UAE Team ADQ
2026	Poland	Dominika Włodarczyk	UAE Team L'Imad
