= Giro dell'Emilia Internazionale Donne Elite =

Italian one-day road cycling race

Race details
- Date: October
- Region: Emilia, Italy
- Discipline: Road
- Competition: UCI Women's ProSeries
- Type: One-day race
- Organiser: GS Emilia
- Web site: www.gsemilia.it

History
- First edition: 2014
- Editions: 13 (as of 2026)
- First winner: Rosella Ratto (ITA)
- Most wins: Elisa Longo Borghini (ITA) (4 wins)
- Most recent: Alessia Vigilia (ITA)

The Giro dell'Emilia Internazionale Donne Elite is a women's cycle race which takes place in October in the historic region of Emilia in Italy. It is the women's race of the Giro dell'Emilia – a longstanding event on the men's cycling calendar that was first held in 1909. The race is one of the autumn classics, alongside the Tre Valli Varesine race.

The race was first held in 2014, becoming a UCI 1.1 race in 2015. Since 2020, the race has been part of the UCI Women's ProSeries.

== Overall winners ==
Year	Country	Rider	Team
2014	Italy	Rosella Ratto	Estado de Mexico Faren
2015	Italy	Elisa Longo Borghini	Italy (national team)
2016	Italy	Elisa Longo Borghini	Wiggle High5
2017	Italy	Tatiana Guderzo	Italy (national team)
2018	Lithuania	Rasa Leleivytė	Aromitalia Vaiano
2019	Netherlands	Demi Vollering	Parkhotel Valkenburg
2020	Denmark	Cecilie Uttrup Ludwig	FDJ Nouvelle-Aquitaine Futuroscope
2021	Spain	Margarita Victoria García	Alé BTC Ljubljana
2022	Italy	Elisa Longo Borghini	Trek–Segafredo
2023	Denmark	Cecilie Uttrup Ludwig	FDJ–Suez
2024	Italy	Elisa Longo Borghini	Lidl–Trek
2025	Mauritius	Kim Le Court	AG Insurance–Soudal
2026	Italy	Alessia Vigilia	Uno-X Mobility
