= Clásica Féminas de Navarra =

Road bicycle race in Spain

Race details
- Date: May
- Region: Spain
- English name: Navarra Women's Elite Classic
- Discipline: Road
- Competition: UCI 1.2 (2019); 1.1 (2020–2022); UCI Women's ProSeries (2023–)
- Type: Road Race
- Web site: womens.vueltanavarra.com

History
- First edition: 2019
- Editions: 7 (as of 2025)
- First winner: Sarah Roy (AUS)
- Most wins: No repeat winners
- Most recent: Cat Ferguson (GBR)

The Clásica Féminas de Navarra is an annual professional road bicycle race for women in the Navarra region of Spain. First held in 2019, the race joined the UCI Women's ProSeries in 2023.

The race route usually involves sharp, steep climbs in and around Pamplona, with a steep finish into the city.

== Winners ==
Year	Country	Rider	Team
2019	Australia	Sarah Roy	Mitchelton–Scott
2020	Netherlands	Annemiek van Vleuten	Mitchelton–Scott
2021	Cuba	Arlenis Sierra	A.R. Monex
2022	United States	Veronica Ewers	EF Education–Tibco–SVB
2023	Netherlands	Riejanne Markus	Team Jumbo–Visma
2024	Germany	Hannah Ludwig	Cofidis
2025	Great Britain	Cat Ferguson	Movistar Team
