= Setmana Ciclista Valenciana =

Race details
- Date: Feb-March
- Region: Spain
- Discipline: Road
- Competition: UCI 2.2 (2017–2020); UCI 2.1 (2021–2022); UCI 2.Pro (2023–)
- Type: Stage race
- Organiser: Federacio Ciclisme Comunitat Valenciana

History
- First edition: 2017
- Editions: 10 (as of 2026)
- First winner: Cecilie Uttrup Ludwig (DEN)
- Most wins: Annemiek van Vleuten (NED); Demi Vollering (NED) (2 wins each)
- Most recent: Demi Vollering (NED)

The Setmana Ciclista Valenciana is an annual professional road bicycle race for women in Spain.

== Winners ==
Year	Country	Rider	Team
2017	Denmark	Cecilie Uttrup Ludwig	Cervélo–Bigla Pro Cycling
2018	Great Britain	Hannah Barnes	Canyon//SRAM
2019	Germany	Clara Koppenburg	WNT–Rotor Pro Cycling
2020	Netherlands	Anna van der Breggen	Boels–Dolmans
2021	Netherlands	Annemiek Van Vleuten	Movistar Team
2022	Netherlands	Annemiek Van Vleuten	Movistar Team
2023	Belgium	Justine Ghekiere	AG Insurance–Soudal–Quick-Step
2024	Switzerland	Marlen Reusser	Team SD Worx–Protime
2025	Netherlands	Demi Vollering	FDJ–Suez
2026	Netherlands	Demi Vollering	FDJ United–Suez

== Classification leaders jerseys ==
Classification	2017	2018	2019	2020	2021	2022
General						
Sprints						
Mountains						
Youth						
Valencian						
