= Holland Hills Classic =

Dutch one-day road cycling race

- Logo of the event

Race details
- Date: May
- Region: Limburg, The Netherlands
- Discipline: Road race
- Type: Single day race
- Organiser: Stichting Holland Ladies Tour
- Race director: Thijs Rondhuis
- Web site: www.hollandhillsclassic.eu

History
- First edition: 2004
- Editions: 13
- Final edition: 2016
- First winner: Mirjam Melchers (NED)
- Most wins: Marianne Vos (NED) (3 wins)
- Final winner: Lizzie Armitstead (GBR)

The Holland Hills Classic was a women's elite professional road bicycle race held annually between 2004 and 2016 in Limburg, the Netherlands. The race was categorised as a 1.1 UCI category race, and was organised by the Stichting Holland Ladies Tour, who also organised the Holland Ladies Tour.

== Sponsorship ==
For sponsorship reasons the race held the official titles of the Gulpen Hills Classic between 2004 and 2007, the Valkenburg Hills Classic in 2010, the Parkhotel Rooding Classic in 2011, the Parkhotel Valkenburg Hills Classic in 2012 and the Boels Rental Hills Classic from 2013 until 2016.

== History ==
In its first four years, the race was held in August with the start and finish in Gulpen. From 2008 to 2013, the start and finish were held in Valkenburg aan de Geul and in 2011 the race moved to the spring. From 2014, the start was in Sittard and the finish was on top of the Geulhemmerberg hill in Berg en Terblijt.

In September 2016, shortly after the organisers of the Amstel Gold Race announced their inaugural women's race for 2017 on mainly the same parcours, in the same region and in the same part of the season, the main sponsor Boels Rental and race director Thijs Rondhuis said there would not be a Hills Classic in 2017.

== Past winners ==
Year	First	Second	Third
2004	Mirjam Melchers (NED)	Leontien van Moorsel (NED)	Arenda Grimberg (NED)
2005	Anita Valen De Vries (NOR)	Trixi Worrack (GER)	Arenda Grimberg (NED)
2006	Theresa Senff (GER)	Marianne Vos (NED)	Suzanne de Goede (NED)
2007	Marianne Vos (NED)	Susanne Ljungskog (SWE)	Andrea Graus (AUT)
2008	Larissa Kleinmann (GER)	Elisabeth Braam (NED)	Vera Koedooder (NED)
2009	Marianne Vos (NED)	Petra Dijkman (NED)	Emma Johansson (SWE)
2010	Grace Verbeke (BEL)	Chantal Blaak (NED)	Iris Slappendel (NED)
2011	Marianne Vos (NED)	Marieke van Wanroij (NED)	Jessie Daams (BEL)
2012	Annemiek van Vleuten (NED)	Marianne Vos (NED)	Sharon Laws (GBR)
2013	Ashleigh Moolman (RSA)	Annemiek van Vleuten (NED)	Lizzie Armitstead (GBR)
2014	Emma Johansson (SWE)	Ellen van Dijk (NED)	Amy Pieters (NED)
2015	Lizzie Armitstead (GBR)	Emma Johansson (SWE)	Katarzyna Niewiadoma (POL)
2016	Lizzie Armitstead (GBR)	Annemiek van Vleuten (NED)	Ashleigh Moolman (RSA)
