= Cycling at the 2016 Summer Olympics – Women's individual road race =

Women's cycling road race at the Games of the XXXI Olympiad
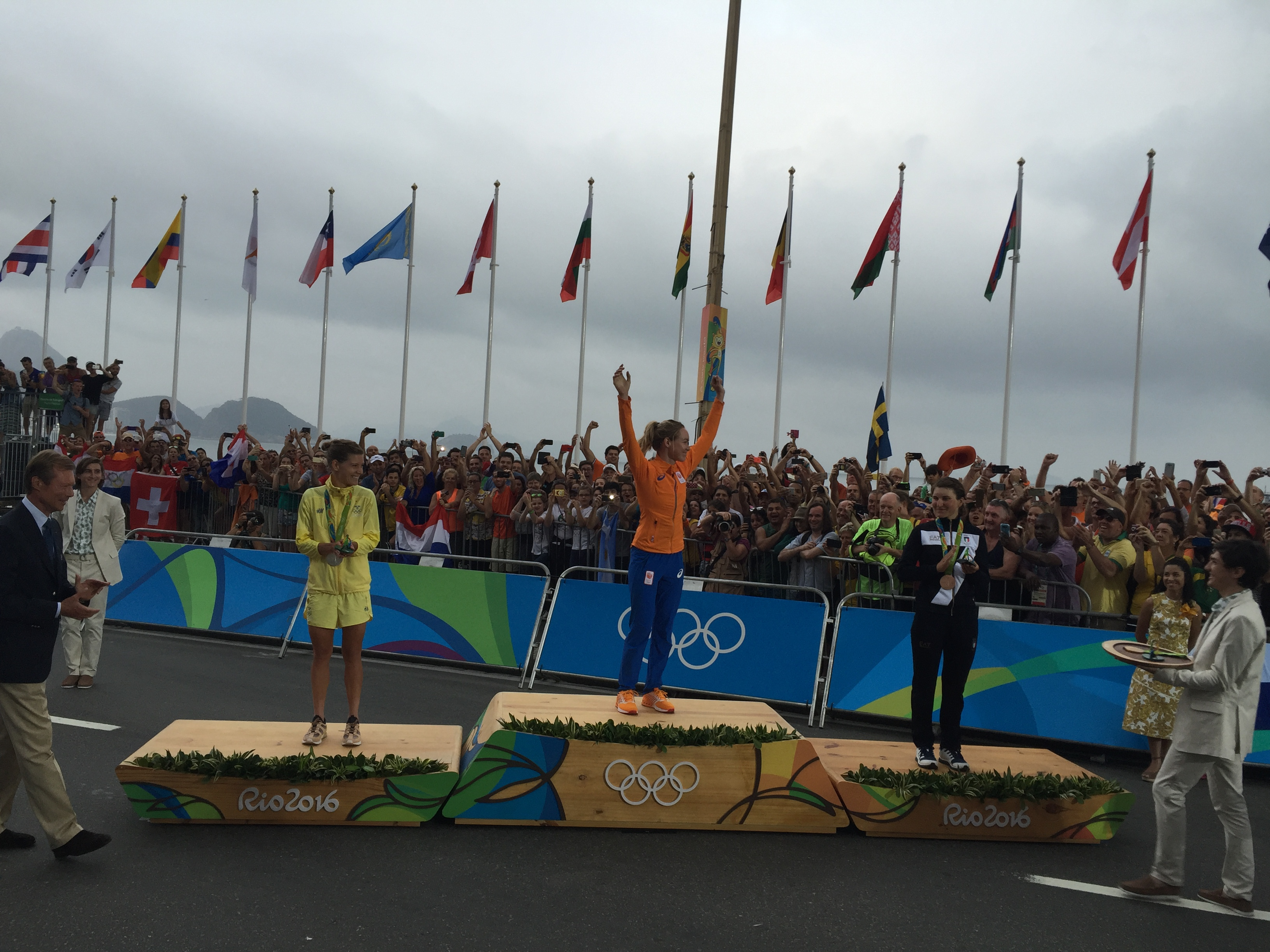
- The podium of the event
- Venue: Fort Copacabana; 141 km (87.6 mi)
- Date: 7 August 2016
- Competitors: 68 from 39 nations
- Winning time: 3:51:27

Medalists
| 1st place, gold medalist(s) | | Anna van der Breggen | Netherlands |
| 2nd place, silver medalist(s) | | Emma Johansson | Sweden |
| 3rd place, bronze medalist(s) | | Elisa Longo Borghini | Italy |

The women's road race was one of 18 cycling events of the 2016 Olympic Games in Rio de Janeiro. The event was held on 7 August 2016 at Fort Copacabana and was won by Anna van der Breggen from the Netherlands.

During the race, Dutch rider Annemiek van Vleuten crashed on the steep descent from Vista Chinesa while leading the race, just 12 kilometres (7.5 miles) from the finish. The crash knocked her unconscious, and she was hospitalised with three lumbar spinal fractures and a severe concussion. Van Vleuten recovered, and returned to competition a month later.

== Course ==
The women's course was 141 km (87.6 mi) long. Starting at Fort Copacabana, the peloton headed west to pass through Ipanema, Barra, and Reserva Maripendi Beaches via the coastal road leading to the 24.8 km (15.4 mi) Pontal / Grumari circuit loop. After two laps of the Grumari sector 49.6 km (30.8 mi), the course returned east via the same coastal road to enter the Vista Chinesa circuit loop at Gávea for one lap of the 25.7 km (16.0 mi) circuit before finishing back at Fort Copacabana. As with all road races during the Olympic Games, law enforcement escorted the athletes to keep them and bystanders safe during the competition. The Brazilian Federal Highway Police (PRF) were assigned the duty to escort the athletes during the 2016 Olympics.

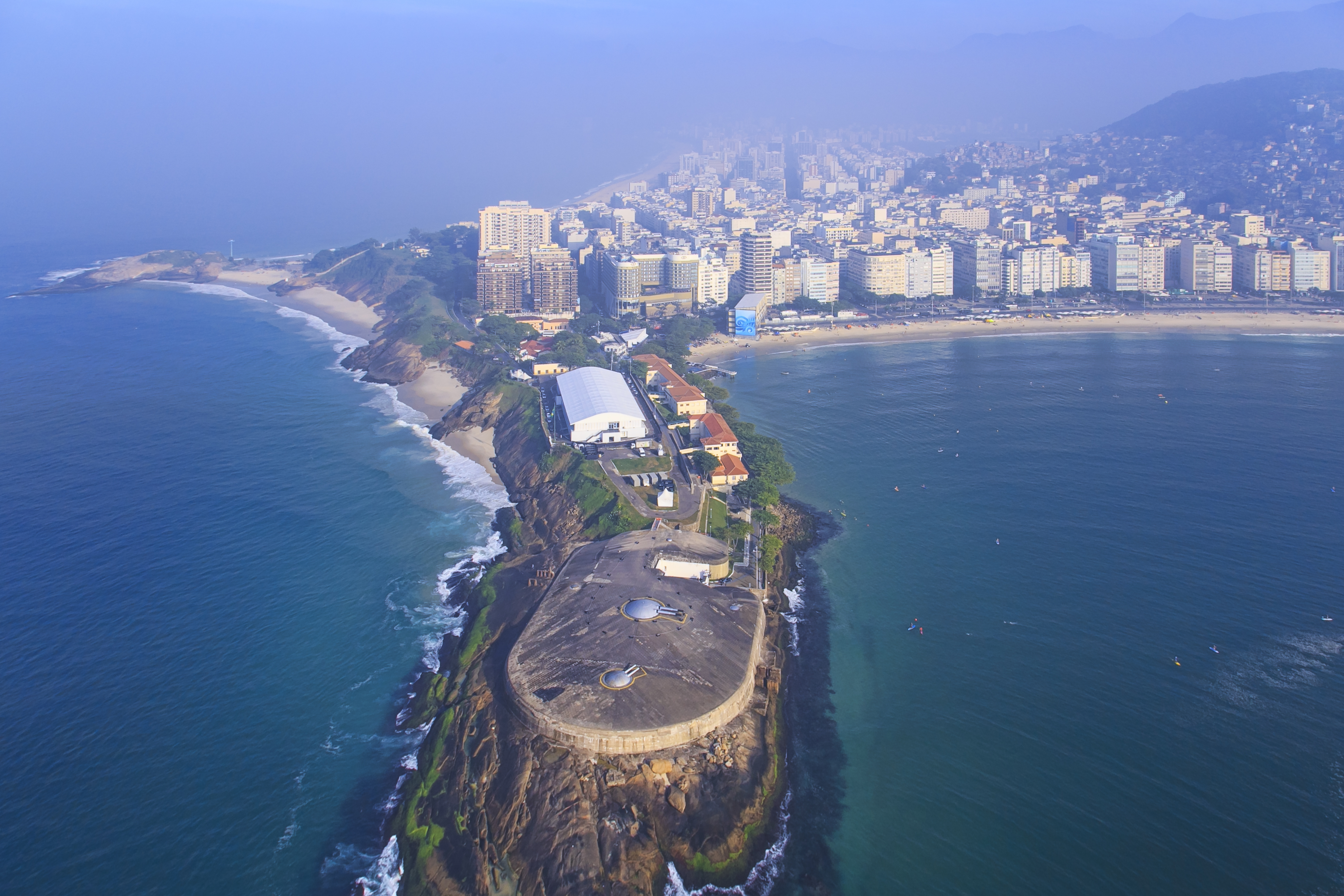
Forte de Copacabana The venue of the race

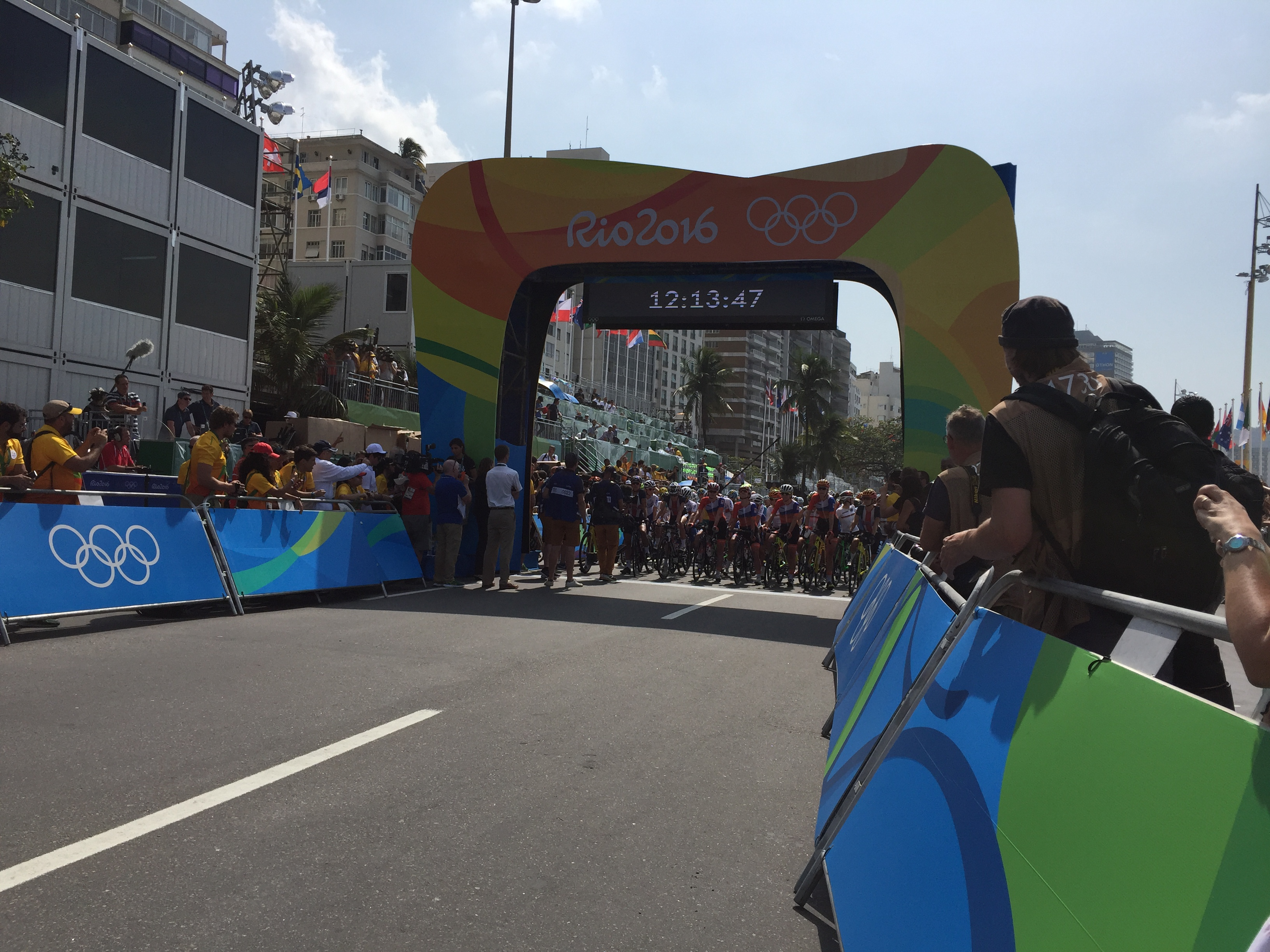
The start/finish (The start pictured)

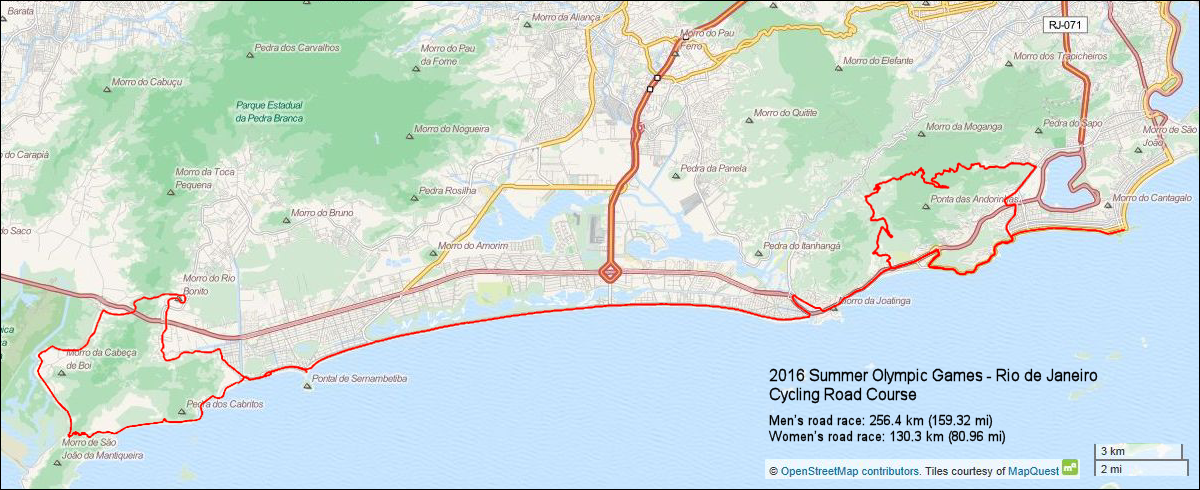
2016 Olympic Cycling Women's Road Course: 141 km

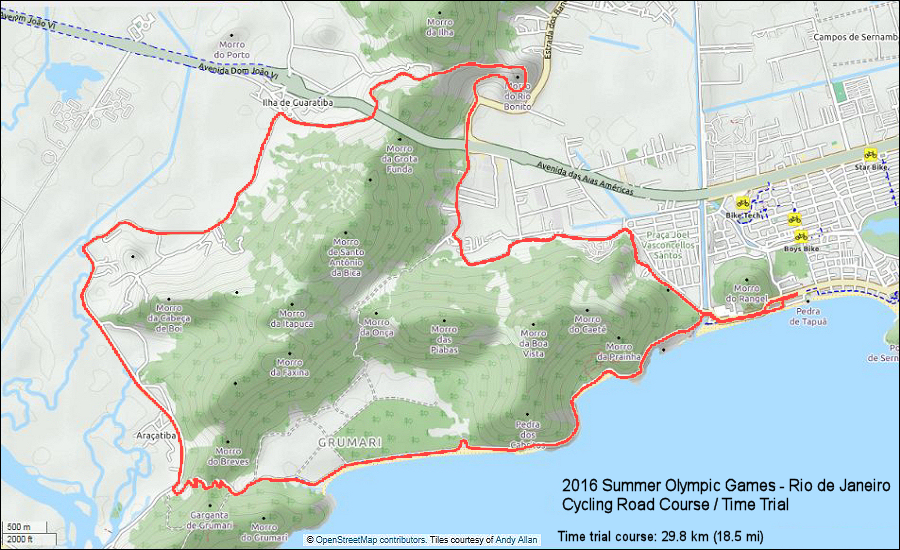
2016 Olympic Cycling Grumari Circuit: 24.8 km

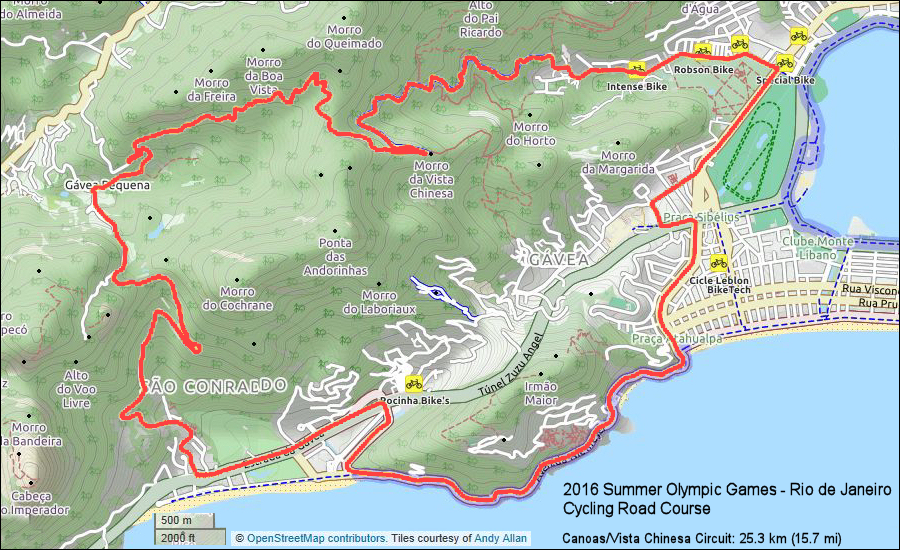
2016 Olympic Cycling Vista Chinesa Circuit: 25.7 km

== Start list ==
The following NOCs had qualified riders to compete in the road race event. The following riders were confirmed by their respective NOCs.

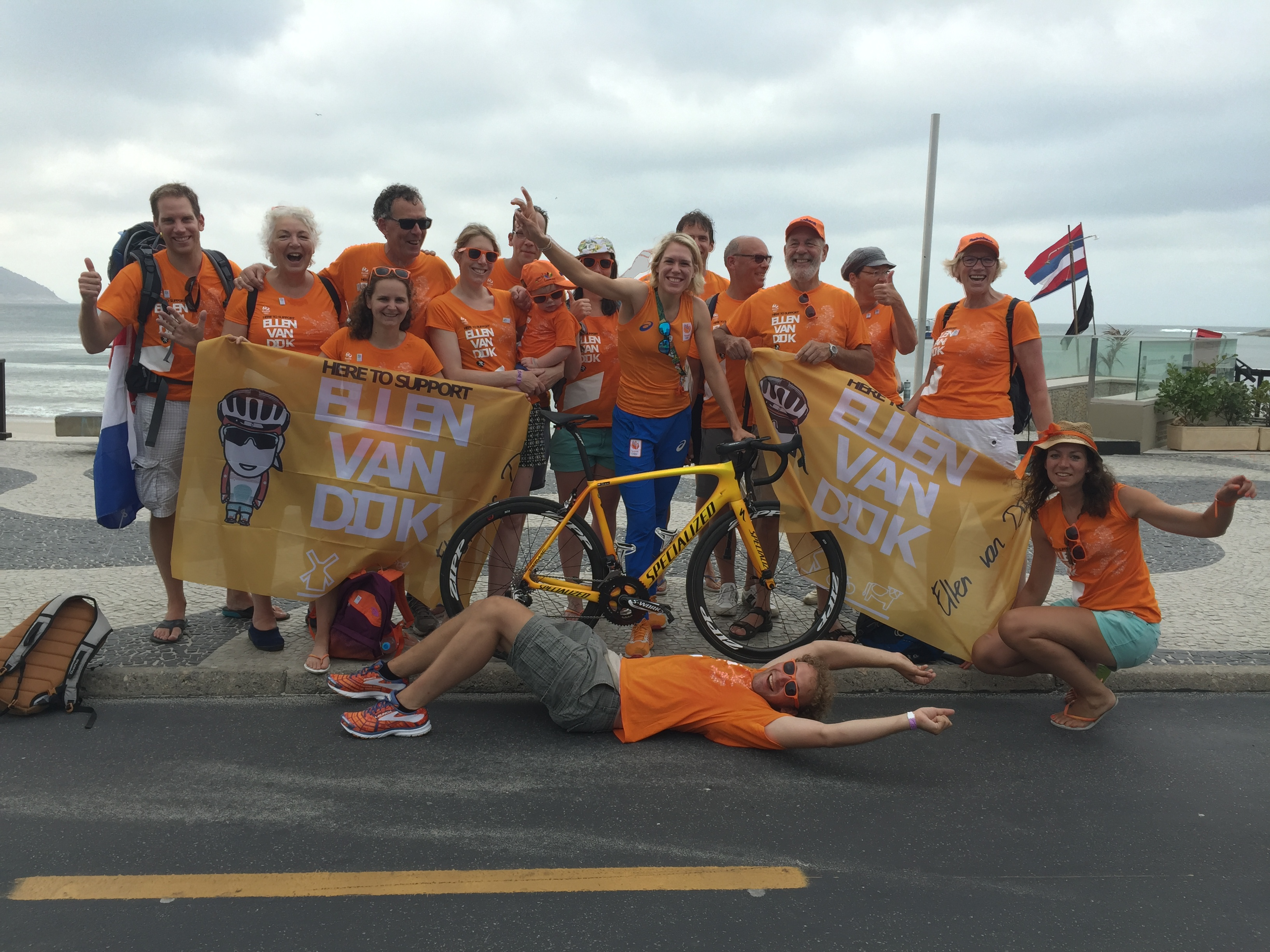
Dutch cyclist Ellen van Dijk and her fans

| NOC | # Athletes | Confirmed Athletes | Ref |
|---|---|---|---|
| Australia | 4 | Gracie Elvin; Katrin Garfoot; Rachel Neylan; Amanda Spratt | * |
| Austria | 1 | Martina Ritter | * |
| Azerbaijan | 1 | Olena Pavlukhina | * |
| Belgium | 3 | Ann-Sophie Duyck; Lotte Kopecky; Anisha Vekemans | |
| Belarus | 1 | Alena Amialiusik | * |
| Brazil | 2 | Clemilda Fernandes; Flávia Oliveira | |
| Canada | 3 | Karol-Ann Canuel; Leah Kirchmann; Tara Whitten | * |
| Chile | 1 | Paola Muñoz Grandon | * |
| Colombia | 1 | Ana Cristina Sanabria Sánchez | * |
| Cuba | 1 | Arlenis Sierra | * |
| Cyprus | 1 | Antri Christoforou | * |
| Spain | 1 | Ane Santesteban | |
| Finland | 1 | Lotta Lepistö | |
| France | 2 | Pauline Ferrand-Prévot; Audrey Cordon | |
| Great Britain | 3 | Lizzie Armitstead; Nikki Harris; Emma Pooley | * |
| Germany | 4 | Lisa Brennauer; Romy Kasper; Claudia Lichtenberg; Trixi Worrack | * |
| Israel | 1 | Shani Bloch | * |
| Italy | 4 | Elisa Longo Borghini; Giorgia Bronzini; Tatiana Guderzo; Elena Cecchini | * |
| Japan | 1 | Eri Yonamine | * |
| South Korea | 1 | Ah Reum Na | * |
| Lithuania | 1 | Daiva Tušlaitė | * |
| Luxembourg | 2 | Christine Majerus; Chantal Hoffmann | * |
| Mexico | 1 | Carolina Rodriguez Gutierrez | * |
| Namibia | 1 | Vera Adrian | * |
| Netherlands | 4 | Marianne Vos; Anna van der Breggen; Ellen van Dijk; Annemiek van Vleuten | |
| Norway | 1 | Vita Heine | * |
| New Zealand | 1 | Linda Villumsen | * |
| Poland | 3 | Katarzyna Niewiadoma; Małgorzata Jasińska; Anna Plichta | * |
| South Africa | 2 | Ashleigh Moolman; An-Li Kachelhoffer | * |
| Russia | 1 | Olga Zabelinskaya | * |
| Slovenia | 1 | Polona Batagelj | * |
| Switzerland | 1 | Jolanda Neff | |
| Sweden | 3 | Emma Johansson; Sara Mustonen; Emilia Fahlin | |
| Thailand | 1 | Jutatip Maneephan | * |
| Chinese Taipei | 1 | Huang Ting-ying | * |
| Ukraine | 1 | Hanna Solovey | * |
| United States | 4 | Mara Abbott; Kristin Armstrong; Megan Guarnier; Evelyn Stevens | * |
| Venezuela | 1 | Jennifer Cesar | * |

* ref:

Over time limit (OTL)
Under UCI regulations for one-day road races (article 2.3.039), "Any rider finishing in a time exceeding that of the winner by more than 5% shall not be placed".

== Result ==
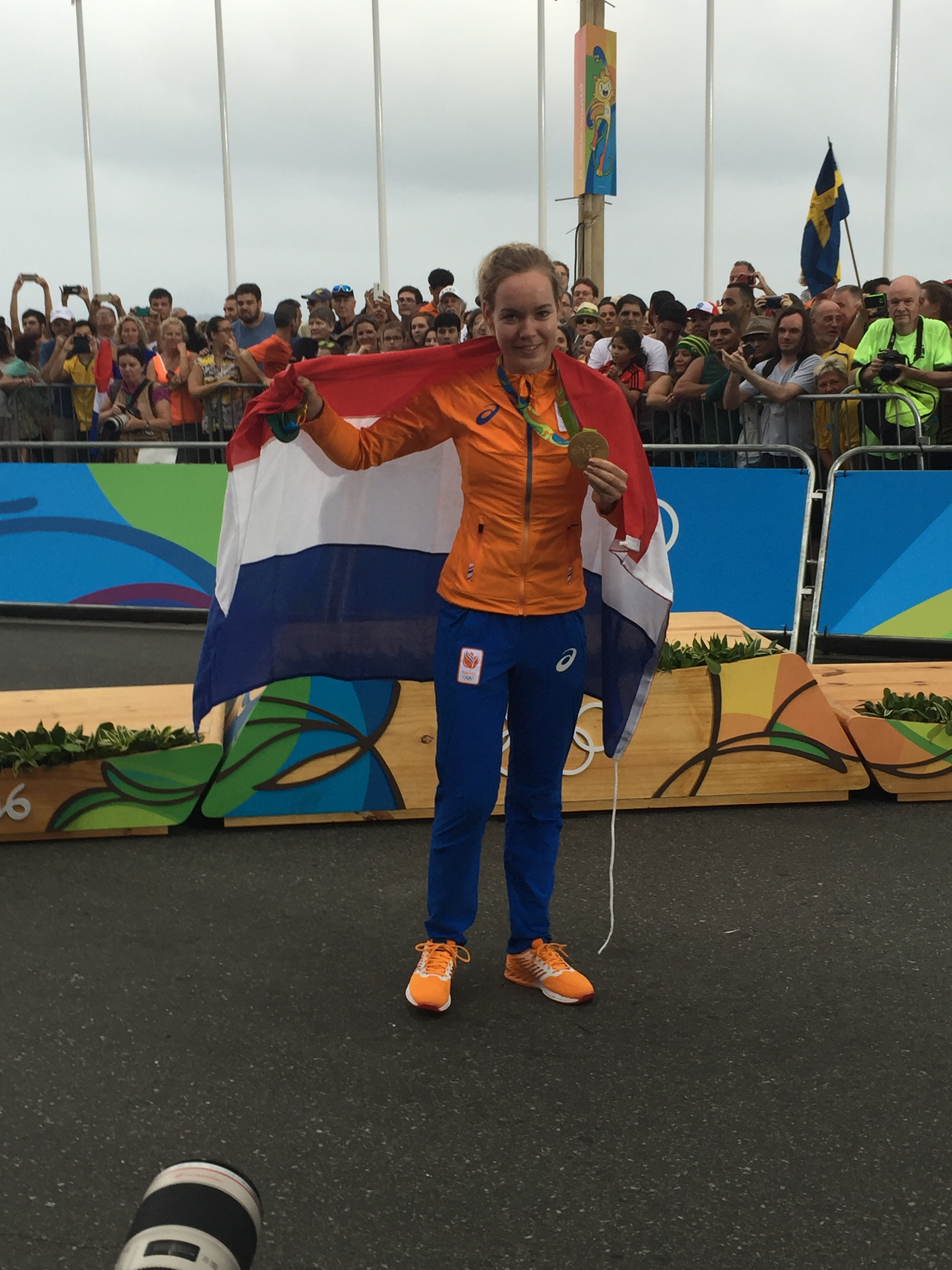
Winner Anna van der Breggen

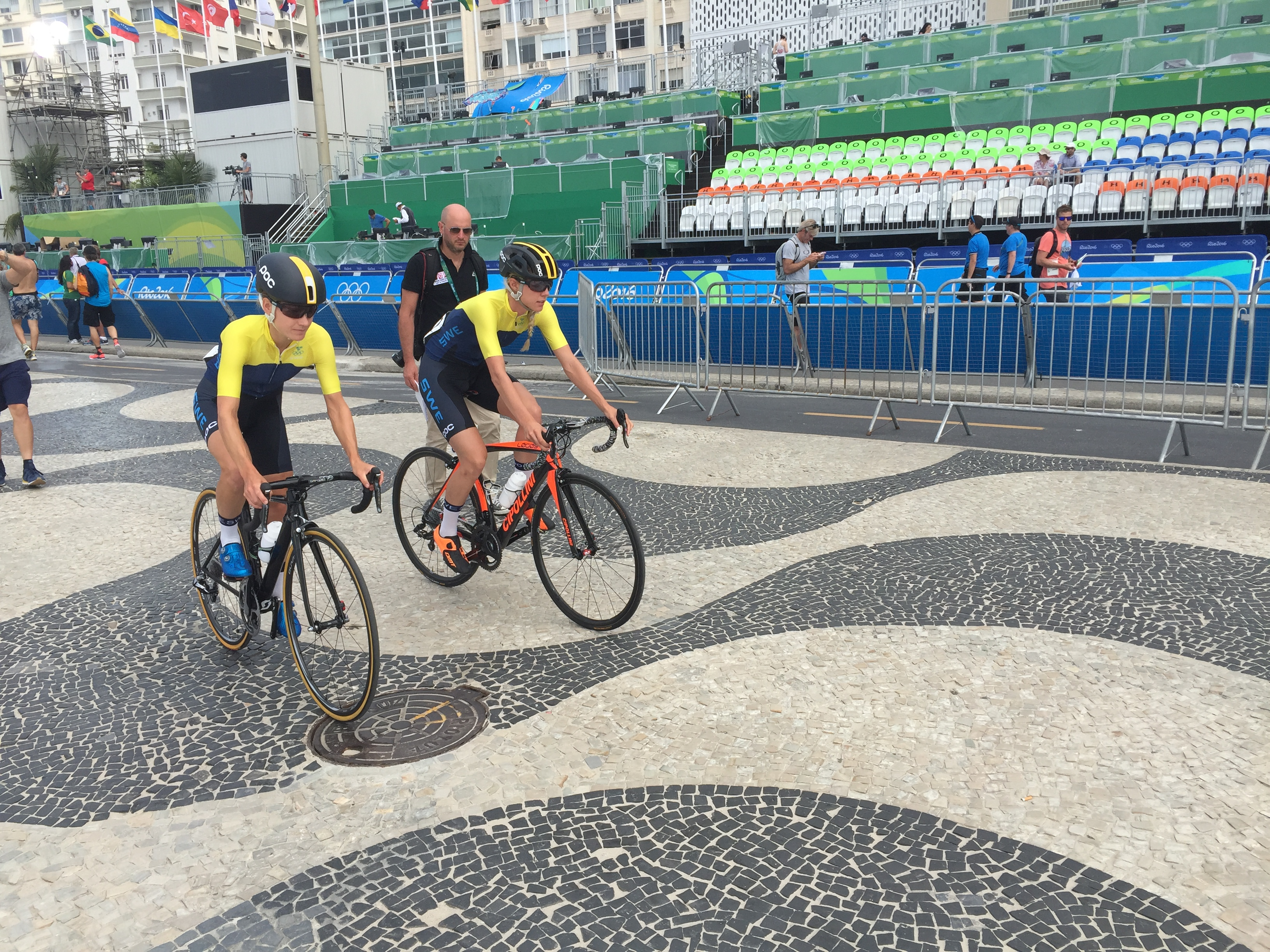
Emma Johansson (left) finished second

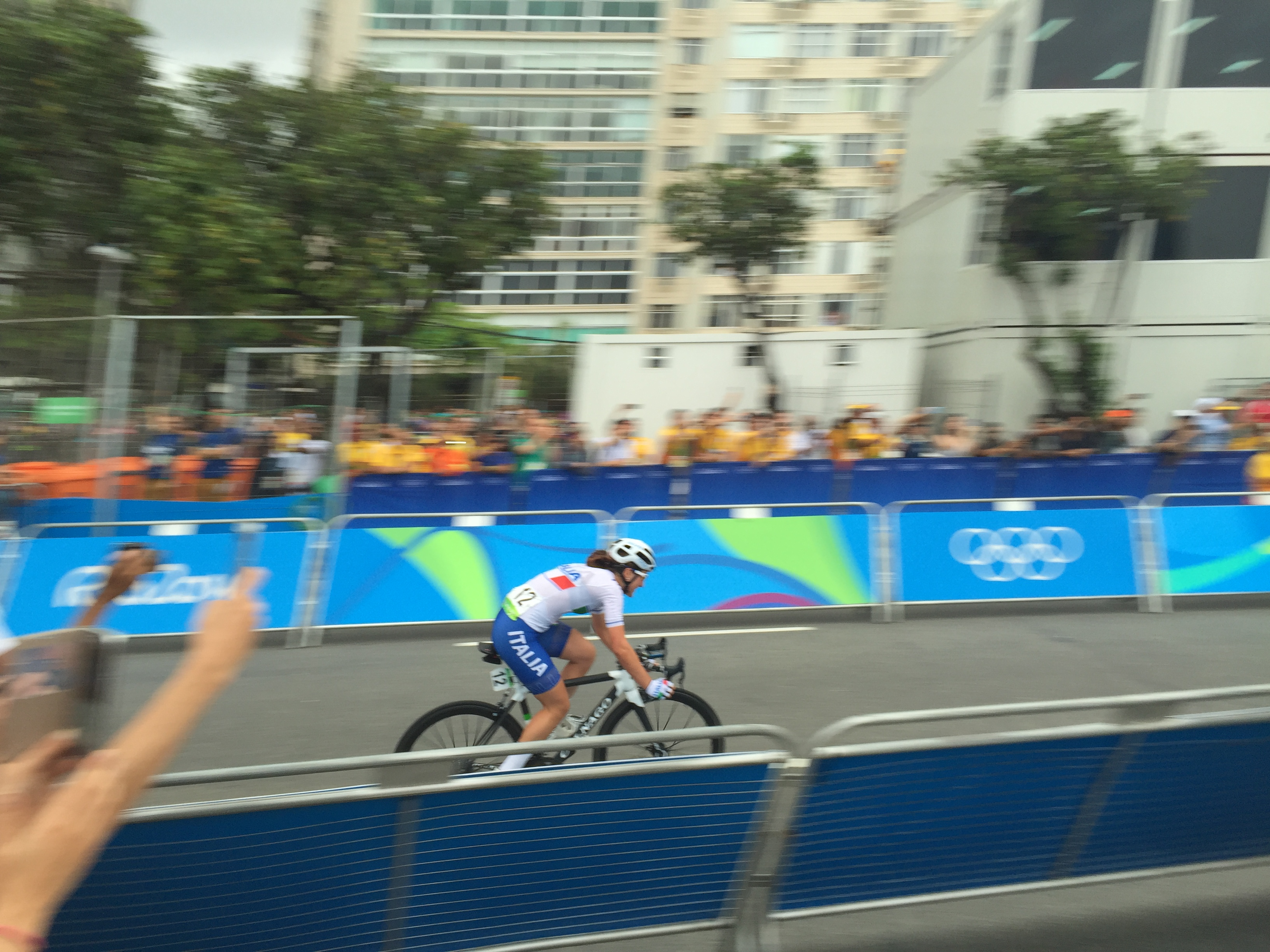
Elisa Longo Borghini finished third

Final results
| Rank | Rider | Time |
|---|---|---|
| 1st place, gold medalist(s) | Anna van der Breggen (NED) | 3h 51' 27" |
| 2nd place, silver medalist(s) | Emma Johansson (SWE) | s.t. |
| 3rd place, bronze medalist(s) | Elisa Longo Borghini (ITA) | s.t. |
| 4 | Mara Abbott (USA) | + 4" |
| 5 | Lizzie Armitstead (GBR) | + 20" |
| 6 | Katarzyna Niewiadoma (POL) | s.t. |
| 7 | Flávia Oliveira (BRA) | s.t. |
| 8 | Jolanda Neff (SUI) | s.t. |
| 9 | Marianne Vos (NED) | + 1' 14" |
| 10 | Ashleigh Moolman-Pasio (RSA) | s.t. |
Final Classification (11– 50)
| 11 | Megan Guarnier (USA) | s.t. |
| 12 | Evelyn Stevens (USA) | + 1' 16" |
| 13 | Alena Amialiusik (BLR) | + 2' 16" |
| 14 | Tatiana Guderzo (ITA) | + 2' 19" |
| 15 | Amanda Spratt (AUS) | + 4' 09" |
| 16 | Olga Zabelinskaya (RUS) | + 4' 25" |
| 17 | Eri Yonamine (JPN) | + 4' 56" |
| 18 | Christine Majerus (LUX) | + 5' 07" |
| 19 | Lisa Brennauer (GER) | s.t. |
| 20 | Elena Cecchini (ITA) | s.t. |
| 21 | Ellen van Dijk (NED) | s.t. |
| 22 | Rachel Neylan (AUS) | s.t. |
| 23 | Linda Villumsen (NZL) | s.t. |
| 24 | Małgorzata Jasińska (POL) | s.t. |
| 25 | Karol-Ann Canuel (CAN) | s.t. |
| 26 | Pauline Ferrand-Prévot (FRA) | s.t. |
| 27 | Emilia Fahlin (SWE) | + 6' 36" |
| 28 | Arlenis Sierra (CUB) | s.t. |
| 29 | Anisha Vekemans (BEL) | s.t. |
| 30 | Na Ah-reum (KOR) | s.t. |
| 31 | Claudia Lichtenberg (GER) | s.t. |
| 32 | Polona Batagelj (SLO) | s.t. |
| 33 | Vita Heine (NOR) | + 7' 07" |
| 34 | Daiva Tušlaitė (LTU) | s.t |
| 35 | Olena Pavlukhina (AZE) | + 7' 38" |
| 36 | Hanna Solovey (UKR) | + 9' 35" |
| 37 | Audrey Cordon (FRA) | + 9' 37" |
| 38 | Leah Kirchmann (CAN) | + 10' 02" |
| 39 | An-Li Kachelhoffer (RSA) | s.t. |
| 40 | Ana Sanabria (COL) | s.t. |
| 41 | Anna Plichta (POL) | s.t. |
| 42 | Giorgia Bronzini (ITA) | + 10' 06" |
| 43 | Trixi Worrack (GER) | s.t. |
| 44 | Romy Kasper (GER) | + 10' 40" |
| 45 | Lotte Kopecky (BEL) | s.t. |
| 46 | Martina Ritter (AUT) | s.t. |
| 47 | Ane Santesteban (ESP) | + 11' 32" |
| 48 | Shani Bloch (ISR) | s.t. |
| 49 | Gracie Elvin (AUS) | + 11' 34" |
| 50 | Jennifer Cesar (VEN) | + 11' 51" |
| 51 | Lotta Lepistö (FIN) | + 12' 07" |
| 52 | Nikki Harris (GBR) | s.t. |
| 53 | Emma Pooley (GBR) | + 17' 45" |
Over time limit
| – | Clemilda Fernandes (BRA) | OTL |
| – | Antri Christoforou (CYP) | OTL |
Did not finish
| – | Annemiek van Vleuten (NED) | DNF |
| – | Kristin Armstrong (USA) | DNF |
| – | Katrin Garfoot (AUS) | DNF |
| – | Tara Whitten (CAN) | DNF |
| – | Sara Mustonen (SWE) | DNF |
| – | Ann-Sophie Duyck (BEL) | DNF |
| – | Chantal Hoffmann (LUX) | DNF |
| – | Carolina Rodríguez (MEX) | DNF |
| – | Paola Muñoz (CHI) | DNF |
| – | Jutatip Maneephan (THA) | DNF |
| – | Vera Adrian (NAM) | DNF |
| – | Milagro Mena (CRC) | DNF |
Disqualified
| – | Huang Ting-ying (TPE) | DSQ |
