= Lizzie Deignan =

English track and road racing cyclist

Lizzie Deignan MBE
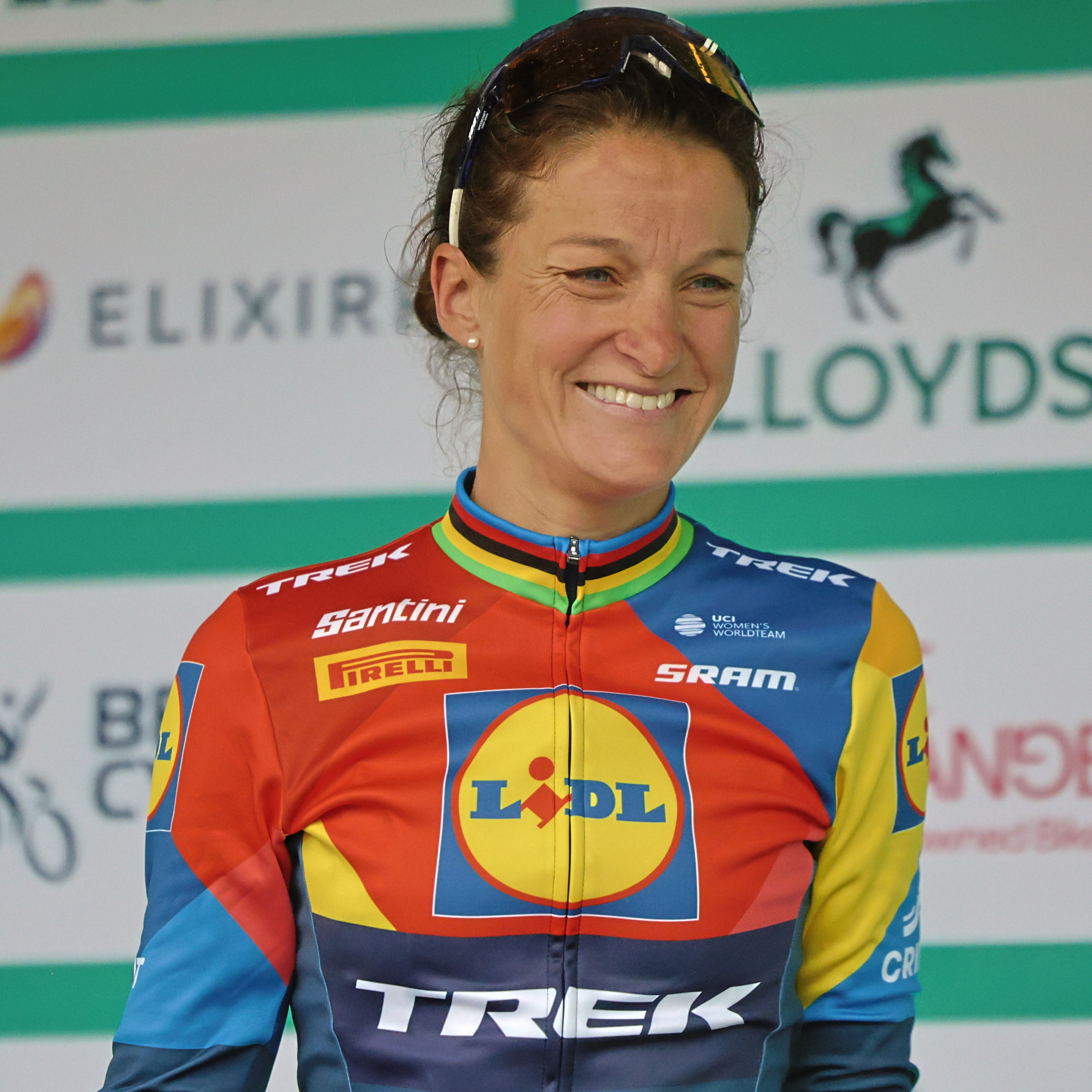
- Deignan in 2025

Personal information
- Full name: Elizabeth Mary Deignan
- Nicknames: Lizzie, Queen Lizzie
- Born: Elizabeth Mary Armitstead; 18 December 1988 (age 37) Otley, West Yorkshire, England
- Height: 1.68 m (5 ft 6 in)
- Weight: 57 kg (126 lb)

Cycling career
- Sport: Cycling
- Current team: Lidl–Trek
- Disciplines: Road; Track
- Role: Retired
- Rider type: All-rounder

Amateur teams
- 2006: Raleigh ERV
- 2007: Global Racing Team
- 2008–2009: 100% ME

Professional teams
- 2008: Team Halfords Bikehut
- 2009: Lotto–Belisol Ladiesteam
- 2010–2011: Cervélo TestTeam
- 2012: AA Drink–leontien.nl
- 2013–2018: Boels–Dolmans
- 2019–2025: Trek–Segafredo

Major wins
- Stage races The Women's Tour (2016, 2019) Ladies Tour of Qatar (2015) One-day races and Classics World Road Race Championships (2015) National Road Race Championships (2011, 2013, 2015, 2017) Ronde van Drenthe (2014) Trofeo Alfredo Binda (2015, 2016) The Philadelphia Cycling Classic (2015) GP de Plouay (2015, 2017, 2020) Strade Bianche (2016) Tour of Flanders (2016) Omloop Het Nieuwsblad (2016) Boels Rental Hills Classic (2015, 2016) Tour de Yorkshire (2017) Liège–Bastogne–Liège (2020) La Course by Le Tour de France (2020) Paris–Roubaix (2021) Other UCI Women's Road World Cup Overall (2014, 2015)
Medal record
Women's road cycling
Representing Great Britain
Olympic Games
Silver medal – second place	2012 London	Road race
World Championships
Gold medal – first place	2015 Richmond	Road race
Representing England
Commonwealth Games
Gold medal – first place	2014 Glasgow	Road race
Silver medal – second place	2010 Delhi	Road race
Representing Boels–Dolmans
World Championships
Gold medal – first place	2016 Doha	Team time trial
Silver medal – second place	2015 Richmond	Team time trial
Women's track cycling
Representing Great Britain
World Championships
Gold medal – first place	2009 Pruszków	Team pursuit
Silver medal – second place	2009 Pruszków	Scratch
Silver medal – second place	2010 Ballerup	Team pursuit
Silver medal – second place	2010 Ballerup	Omnium
Bronze medal – third place	2009 Pruszków	Points race

Elizabeth Mary Deignan MBE (née Armitstead; born 18 December 1988) is an English track and road racing cyclist, who last rode professionally for UCI Women's WorldTeam Lidl–Trek. She was the 2015 World road race champion. She is regarded as the best British female road cyclist of her generation, scoring a total of 43 UCI race wins.

Deignan is also the 2014 Commonwealth Games road race champion and a twice winner of the season-long UCI Women's Road World Cup, winning the overall competition in 2014 and the final edition in 2015. At the 2012 Summer Olympics, Deignan won the silver medal in the road race. She has won the British National Road Race Championships four times, in 2011, 2013, 2015 and 2017.

In 2021, Deignan won the first ever Paris–Roubaix Femmes to add to victories in the women's versions of Tour of Flanders and Liège–Bastogne–Liège, becoming the first woman to win a 'triple crown' of all women's Monument classics. Twice winner of The Women's Tour, the most important stage race for women in the UK, she has also won Strade Bianche Donne, La Course by Le Tour de France and the Trofeo Alfredo Binda-Comune di Cittiglio.

Prior to her road career, Deignan won a total of five medals at the UCI Track Cycling World Championships in 2009 and 2010, including a gold medal in team pursuit in 2009 with Joanna Rowsell and Wendy Houvenaghel.

== Early life ==
Deignan was born in the market town of Otley in West Yorkshire, where she attended Prince Henry's Grammar School, a state comprehensive school. She took up cycling in 2004 after British Cycling's Olympic Talent Team visited the school. She is a graduate of British Cycling's Olympic Podium Programme.

== Career ==
=== 2005–2009: Track years ===
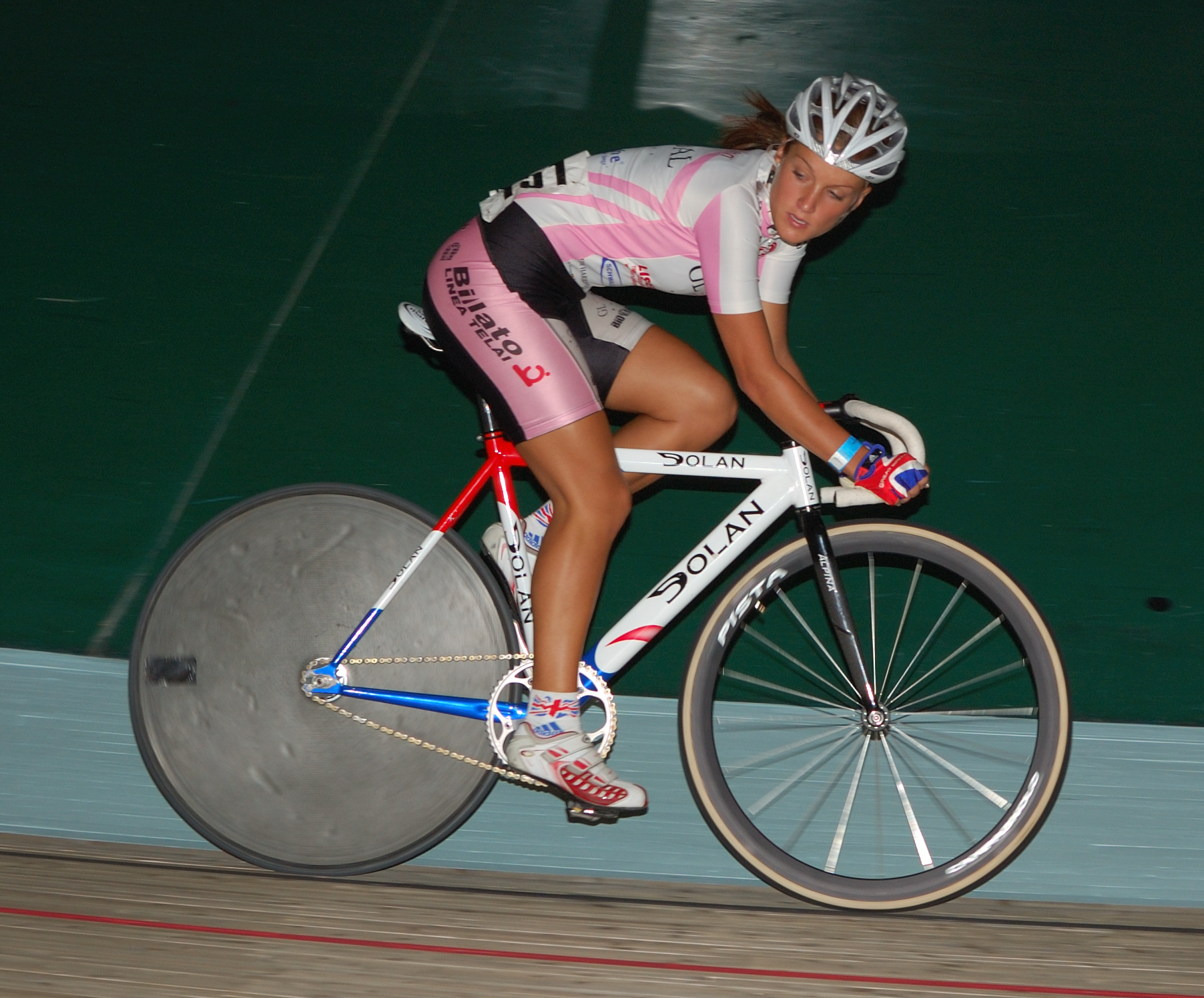
Deignan at the Manchester round of the 2007 Revolution series

Deignan won a silver medal in the scratch race at the Junior World Track Championships in 2005, she was under-23 European Scratch Race Champion in 2007 and 2008, and came second in the Points Race in 2007. In the 2008–09 UCI Track Cycling World Cup Classics, she took a total of seven gold medals after competing in three of the five meetings.

Deignan was a member of the gold medal-winning team pursuit squad at the 2009 UCI Track Cycling World Championships, her second appearance at a senior world championship event. She also competed in the scratch race, where despite being brought down in the closing stages of the race, she jumped back on to claim the silver medal. She completed the championships with a full set of medals, winning bronze in the points race whilst riding with her right wrist numb and strapped up – she was only able to move her forefinger and thumb.

=== 2009–2011: Move to road ===
Alongside her breakthrough in the velodrome, Deignan was also making progress in road racing: in 2008 she was part of the team which delivered Nicole Cooke to the road race gold at the World Championships in Varese, Italy, and the following year she joined the Lotto–Belisol Ladiesteam cycling team and rode a number of top level road races. She won the under 23 category of the British National Road Race Championships and the silver medal in the senior category after some controversy. That season she also took a stage of the Tour de l'Ardèche and won the youth classification of the Giro d'Italia. During the winter of 2009–10, Deignan returned to the track, taking two golds at the Manchester round of the 2009–10 UCI Track Cycling World Cup Classics and two silvers at the 2010 UCI Track Cycling World Championships. In 2010, she rode for Cervélo TestTeam. That year she won three more stages of the Tour de l'Ardèche and a silver medal in the road race at the 2010 Commonwealth Games in Delhi. Deignan decided to stay with the franchise in its new guise as Garmin–Cervélo throughout 2011. That year she clinched the first of four elite British road titles, holding off Cooke, Sharon Laws and Emma Pooley to win in Stamfordham.

=== 2012 ===
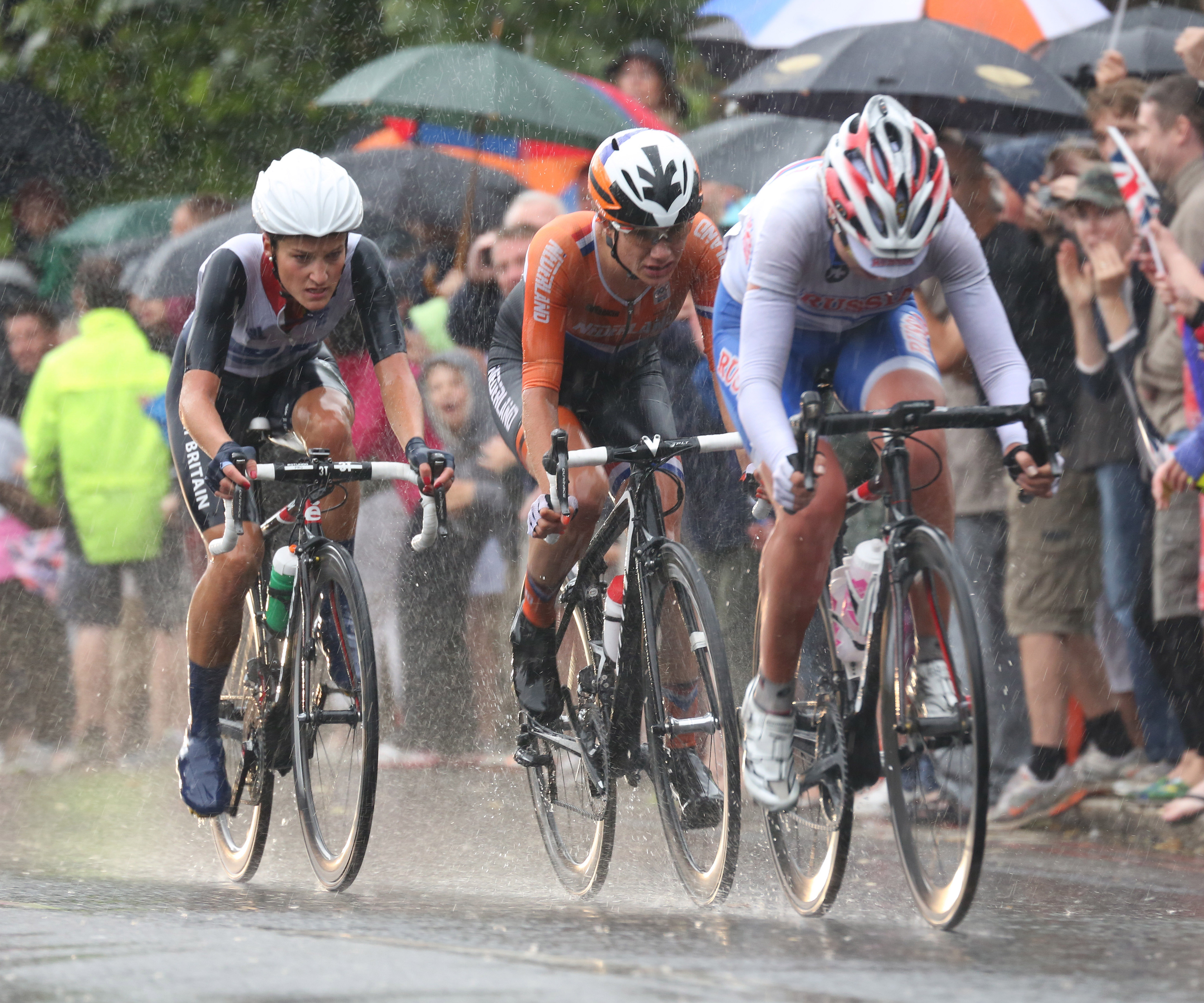
Deignan (left) during the road race at the 2012 Summer Olympics

Following the discontinuation of the Garmin–Cervélo women's team, Deignan rode for the AA Drink–leontien.nl team in 2012. Deignan built the whole of her campaign around the 2012 Summer Olympics, taking spring classics wins at the Omloop van het Hageland and Gent–Wevelgem: at the Games themselves, she would go on to win the silver medal in the road race at the Olympics, behind Marianne Vos, in doing so becoming the first Briton to win a medal at the 2012 Games.

=== 2013 ===
Having had to move teams in the past two seasons due to teams disbanding, Deignan signed for the Boels–Dolmans team for the 2013 season. Her 2013 season was affected by a recurring stomach illness which was eventually diagnosed as a symptom of a hiatal hernia. Even with her well documented medical concerns, Deignan emerged victorious at the British National Road Race Championships in Glasgow – claiming her second white, red and blue jersey.

=== 2014 ===
In April 2014, it was announced that Deignan had renewed her contract with Boels–Dolmans until the end of 2016. Deignan enjoyed a career-best year, starting with a win at the Omloop van het Hageland. A week later she also won the first World Cup race of the season, the Ronde van Drenthe, after teammate Ellen van Dijk closed a significant gap for her in the final kilometres of the race. At the third World Cup race, the Tour of Flanders, she finished second behind van Dijk. Deignan took part in the inaugural La Course by Le Tour de France in Paris on 27 July 2014, but crashed with 1 kilometre (0.62 miles) to the finish. A week later she won the women's road race at the Commonwealth Games. Armitstead, overhauled Emma Pooley with 7 kilometres (4.3 miles) to go to win her first major gold medal. Deignan won the UCI Women's Road World Cup with a race to spare on 24 August 2014. An 8th-place finish in the Open de Suède Vårgårda was enough to secure the overall title.

=== 2015 ===
For the 2015 season, Deignan stated again her intention to build towards the UCI Road World Championships. She claimed the first overall win of her career taking the Ladies Tour of Qatar stage race, as well as winning two stages. Deignan then went on to take victories at the one day World Cup races Trofeo Alfredo Binda-Comune di Cittiglio and Philadelphia Cycling Classic, along with the Holland Hills Classic.

In June, Deignan was forced to pull out of The Women's Tour after colliding with a group of photographers seconds after winning the first stage of the tour in Suffolk. However, ten days later she had recovered sufficiently to win convincingly the British National Road Race Championships for the third time taking her to the top of the UCI world rankings. In August, she sprinted to victory in the final World Cup race of the season, the GP de Plouay, to retain her World Cup title ahead of her main challenger, Anna van der Breggen.

To cap her best season to date, on 26 September, Deignan won the World Championships road race in Richmond, Virginia, USA, beating van der Breggen in a sprint from a small group of nine riders at the finish line, becoming the fourth British woman to win the world road race title after Beryl Burton, Mandy Jones and Nicole Cooke.

=== 2016 ===
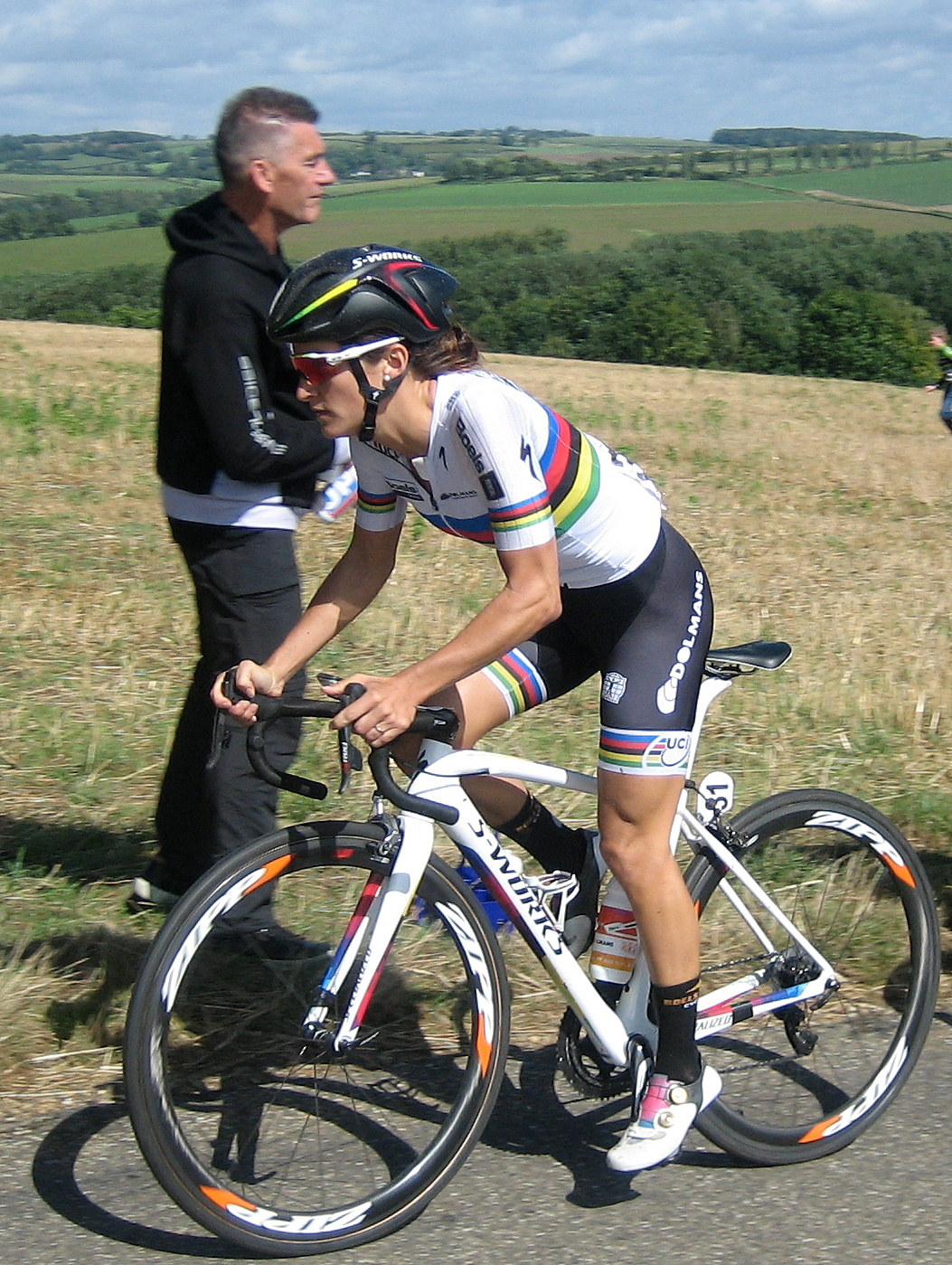
Deignan wearing the world champion rainbow jersey in 2016

Deignan's stated aim for the 2016 season was the road race at the Olympic Games, and she started the season as she had finished off the previous one, securing a number of one day race wins, as well as a General classification victory, breaking any curse of the rainbow jersey. Deignan took four victories in the inaugural UCI Women's World Tour; Strade Bianche, Trofeo Alfredo Binda, Tour of Flanders and the overall title at The Women's Tour. Deignan also took victories in the Holland Hills Classic and Omloop Het Nieuwsblad. At the Games, she finished just outside the medals in fifth place.

==== Missed drugs tests ====
In 2016, Deignan avoided a ban from cycling that would have prevented her from competing in the Olympic Games. The charges against her were that she missed three drugs tests within a 12-month period (20 August 2015, 5 October 2015 and 9 June 2016), an offence that could have led to a four-year ban. However, at the Court of Arbitration for Sport, Deignan argued that the first missed test was not a fault of her own but rather that of the testing authorities. She accepted the other two instances. The CAS agreed with her on the first count, and it was declared not to have been a missed test, clearing her to compete. The decision has drawn criticism from various quarters.

In a 5 August 2016 interview, she said she believes that people will doubt her status as a clean sportsperson forever. World squash champion James Willstrop wrote in defence of Deignan, arguing that the complexity of testing procedures can easily lead to missed tests and noting that she had 16 clean tests in 2016.

=== 2017 ===
Deignan endured a difficult start to her 2017 season: after finishing third at Strade Bianche, she fell ill, which hampered her training. However, her form picked up for the Ardennes classics, finishing second to team-mate van der Breggen in the Amstel Gold Race, La Flèche Wallonne Féminine and Liège–Bastogne–Liège. She subsequently took her first win of the season on home ground at the Tour de Yorkshire in April, crossing the line solo almost a minute ahead of her nearest rivals. She took another solo win at the British National Championships on the Isle of Man in June, attacking from a small group with two laps of the 6.7-kilometre (4.2-mile) finishing circuit remaining alongside Katie Archibald and Hannah Barnes: the trio caught and passed race leader Elinor Barker with 5 kilometres (3.1 miles) to go, with Deignan breaking away immediately afterwards to take her fourth senior national road race title.

The following month, she finished second at La Course by Le Tour de France, finishing behind winner Annemiek van Vleuten on the Col d'Izoard: she stated that she was "surprised" by her performance, having never enjoyed success on a mountaintop finish before. In August she took her first World Tour win of the season at the GP de Plouay – Bretagne, breaking away from rivals alongside Pauline Ferrand-Prévot on the final climb, before outsprinting Ferrand-Prévot to cross the finish line first. She became the third woman to win the race twice, alongside Vos and Pooley. However, the remainder of her season was disrupted shortly afterwards after being struck with appendicitis whilst competing in the Holland Ladies Tour.

=== 2021 ===
Deignan was chosen to be part of the UK's cycling squad at the postponed 2020 Tokyo Olympics where she contested the road race with Anna Shackley as a teammate. The race finished with an unexpected winner in Anna Kiesenhofer of Austria, with Deignan finding the conditions humid and difficult. She finished 11th in the race.

In early October, she went on to win the Paris–Roubaix Femmes with a solo breakaway of more than 80 kilometres (50 miles), a victory described by commentators as one of the greatest Roubaix rides of all time. Deignan therefore became the first woman to win a 'triple crown' of all women's Monument classics, having won the 2016 Tour of Flanders for Women, and the 2020 Liège–Bastogne–Liège Femmes.

=== 2022 ===
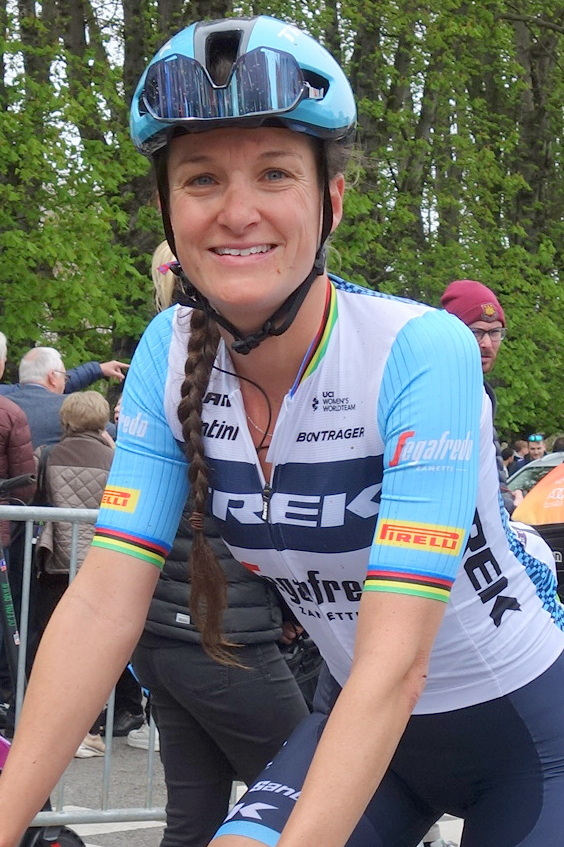
Deignan at the 2023 Liège–Bastogne–Liège Femmes

In February, Deignan announced that she would sit out the 2022 season, as she was pregnant with her second child. She also announced she had signed a contract extension with Trek–Segafredo to return to racing in 2023.

=== 2024 ===
In June, Deignan won the Mountains classification in the Tour of Britain Women having held the position from stage one to the end of the four-day race. She was selected to represent Great Britain at the Paris Olympics, finishing 12th in what was her fourth Games appearance. On 15 November, Deignan announced she would retire at the end of the 2025 season.

=== 2025 ===
In May, Deignan won the stage 1 team time trial at La Vuelta Femenina with her Lidl–Trek teammates. In July, Deignan announced that she was pregnant with her third child, and was therefore retiring from professional cycling with immediate effect.

== Personal life ==
She married fellow professional road racing cyclist Philip Deignan in Otley on 17 September 2016. The couple have two children: a daughter, born in September 2018, and a son, born in September 2022.

She splits her time between Otley and Monaco. Deignan has been a pescetarian for ethical reasons since the age of ten.

== Career achievements ==
=== Major results ===
==== Road ====
2006
1st National Criterium Championships
1st WCRA Criterium Championships
2007
1st National Criterium Championships
5th Omloop van Borsele
6th Road race, UEC European Under-23 Championships
9th Omloop door Middag-Humsterland
2008 (1 pro win)
1st Boezinge–Kampioenschap van Vlaanderen
2009 (1)
1st Road race, National Under-23 Championships
1st Young rider classification, Giro d'Italia Femminile
2nd Road race, National Championships
3rd Overall Tour de l'Ardèche

1st Points classification
1st Stage 6

8th Omloop van Borsele
8th Chrono Champenois
9th Tour de Berne
2010 (5)
1st Road race, National Under-23 Championships
1st Stage 1 Tour de l'Aude
2nd Road race, Commonwealth Games
2nd Road race, National Championships
4th Overall La Route de France

1st Stage 6

4th Overall Tour de l'Ardèche

1st Points classification
1st Stages 3, 4 & 5

5th Emakumeen Saria
7th Overall Ster Zeeuwsche Eilanden
7th Grand Prix Elsy Jacobs
9th Road race, UCI World Championships
2011 (3)
1st Road race, National Championships
Thüringen Rundfahrt

1st Points classification
1st Stage 6

1st Stage 1 Tour of Chongming Island
2nd Tour of Chongming Island World Cup
3rd Open de Suède Vårgårda TTT
4th Omloop van Borsele
6th GP Ciudad de Valladolid
7th Road race, UCI World Championships
7th GP Stad Roeselare
10th Ronde van Drenthe
2012 (1)
1st Omloop van het Hageland
1st Gent–Wevelgem
Olympic Games

2nd Road race
10th Time trial

2nd Road race, National Championships
3rd Novilon Euregio Cup
4th Overall Thüringen Rundfahrt
4th Gooik–Geraardsbergen–Gooik
4th Durango-Durango Emakumeen Saria
6th Overall Ster Zeeuwsche Eilanden
8th GP Stad Roeselare
10th Omloop Het Nieuwsblad
2013 (1)
National Championships

1st Road race
2nd Time trial

2nd Holland Hills Classic
2nd Ridderronde Maastricht
3rd Overall Holland Ladies Tour

1st Sprints classification
1st Combination classification

6th Overall La Route de France
7th Overall Energiewacht Tour
7th Ronde van Drenthe
9th Tour of Flanders
2014 (4)
1st Overall UCI World Cup
1st Road race, Commonwealth Games
1st Omloop van het Hageland
1st Ronde van Drenthe
1st Otley Grand Prix
2nd Overall Thüringen Rundfahrt

1st Points classification
1st Mountains classification
1st Stage 1

2nd Trofeo Alfredo Binda
2nd Tour of Flanders
2nd La Flèche Wallonne
2nd Durango-Durango Emakumeen Saria
3rd Road race, National Championships
3rd Drentse 8
3rd Omloop Het Nieuwsblad
3rd RideLondon Grand Prix
3rd Open de Suède Vårgårda TTT
7th Road race, UCI World Championships
8th Open de Suède Vårgårda
8th GP de Plouay
2015 (10)
UCI World Championships

1st Road race
2nd Team time trial

1st Overall UCI World Cup
1st Road race, National Championships
1st Overall Tour of Qatar

1st Points classification
1st Stages 3 & 4

1st Trofeo Alfredo Binda
1st Holland Hills Classic
1st Philadelphia Cycling Classic
1st GP de Plouay
1st Stage 1 The Women's Tour
2nd Strade Bianche
3rd Omloop Het Nieuwsblad
3rd Crescent Vårgårda TTT
4th La Course by Le Tour de France
7th Ronde van Drenthe
8th Tour of Flanders
2016 (7)
UCI World Championships

1st Team time trial
4th Road race

1st Overall The Women's Tour

1st British rider classification
1st Stage 3

1st Omloop Het Nieuwsblad
1st Strade Bianche
1st Trofeo Alfredo Binda
1st Tour of Flanders
1st Holland Hills Classic
1st Crescent Vårgårda TTT
1st Stage 2 (TTT) Holland Ladies Tour
5th Road race, Olympic Games
2017 (3)
1st Road race, National Championships
1st Tour de Yorkshire
1st GP de Plouay
1st Stage 1 (TTT) Giro Rosa
2nd La Course by Le Tour de France
2nd Amstel Gold Race
2nd La Flèche Wallonne
2nd Liège–Bastogne–Liège
3rd Strade Bianche
2019 (2)
1st Overall The Women's Tour

1st Points classification
1st British rider classification
1st Stage 5

7th Overall Holland Ladies Tour
7th Liège–Bastogne–Liège
2020 (3)
1st Overall UCI World Tour
1st Liège–Bastogne–Liège
1st GP de Plouay
1st La Course by Le Tour de France
1st Stage 1 (TTT) Giro Rosa
4th La Flèche Wallonne
6th Road race, UCI World Championships
8th Gent–Wevelgem
9th Emakumeen Nafarroako Klasikoa
2021 (2)
1st Overall Tour de Suisse

1st Points classification
1st Mountains classification

1st Paris–Roubaix
4th Overall Giro Rosa

1st Stage 1 (TTT)

7th GP de Plouay
9th Overall Thüringen Ladies Tour
9th La Course by Le Tour de France
2023
3rd Overall RideLondon Classique
6th Road race, UCI World Championships
2024
1st Stage 1 (TTT) La Vuelta Femenina
3rd Road race, National Championships
7th Overall Tour of Britain

1st Mountains classification

===== Classics results timeline =====
Classic	2009	2010	2011	2012	2013	2014	2015	2016	2017	2018	2019	2020	2021	2022	2023	2024
Omloop Het Nieuwsblad	—	—	—	10	36	3	3	1	—	—	—	—	111	—	—	44
Strade Bianche	Race did not exist						2	1	3	—	—	37	—	—	—	27
Ronde van Drenthe	—	—	10	17	7	1	7	DNF	—	—	—	NH	—	—	—	—
Trofeo Alfredo Binda	—	—	—	—	DNF	2	1	1	39	—	—	NH	12	—	—	DNF
Gent–Wevelgem	Race did not exist			1	—	—	—	17	—	—	—	8	17	—	—	—
Tour of Flanders	—	—	—	34	9	2	8	1	17	—	—	DNF	18	—	—	DNF
Paris–Roubaix	Race did not exist											NH	1	—	—	—
Amstel Gold Race	Not held								2	—	19	NH	—	—	—	—
La Flèche Wallonne	22	—	47	—	12	2	21	28	2	—	23	4	—	—	88	—
Liège–Bastogne–Liège	Race did not exist								2	—	7	1	—	—	63	—
GP de Plouay	20	49	71	—	24	8	1	66	1	—	—	1	7	—	—	83
Open de Suède Vårgårda	—	—	14	—	DNF	8	19	62	35	—	46	Not held		—	Not held	

Legend
—	Did not compete
DNF	Did not finish
IP	In progress
NH	Not held

==== Track ====
2005
National Junior Championships

1st Points race
2nd 500m time trial
3rd Scratch

2nd Scratch, UCI World Junior Championships
2006
2nd Scratch, National Championships
National Junior Championships

2nd Points race
2nd Individual pursuit
3rd Scratch
3rd 500m time trial

2007
UEC European Under-23 Championships

1st Scratch
2nd Points race

2008
UEC European Under-23 Championships

1st Scratch
1st Team pursuit
2nd Points race

UCI World Cup Classics

1st Points race, Manchester
1st Scratch, Manchester
1st Team pursuit, Manchester
1st Scratch, Melbourne
1st Team pursuit, Melbourne

2009
UCI World Championships

1st Team pursuit
2nd Scratch
3rd Points race

2008–09 UCI World Cup Classics, Copenhagen

1st Scratch
1st Team pursuit

2009–10 UCI World Cup Classics, Manchester

1st Team pursuit
1st Points race

2010
UCI World Championships

2nd Team pursuit
2nd Omnium

2011
National Championships

1st Points race
1st Scratch

2015
Revolution Series

1st Points race, Manchester
1st Points race, Glasgow
3rd Scratch, Glasgow

=== Awards and honours ===
In 2015, Deignan was nominated for the 2015 BBC Sports Personality of the Year Award, following her world championship victory; she finished tenth, with approximately 22,000 of the 1.009 million votes cast.

Deignan was appointed Member of the Order of the British Empire (MBE) in the 2023 New Year Honours for services to cycling.

Her name is one of those featured on the sculpture Ribbons, unveiled in 2024.
