= 2014 Omloop van het Hageland =

Race details
- Dates: 9 March 2014
- Stages: 1
- Distance: 122.3 km (76.0 mi)
- Winning time: 3h 15' 43"

Results
	Winner	Lizzie Armitstead (GBR)	(Boels–Dolmans)
	Second	Emma Johansson (SWE)	(Orica–AIS)
	Third	Audrey Cordon (FRA)	(Hitec Products UCK)

The 2014 Omloop van het Hageland was the tenth running of the women's Omloop van het Hageland, a women's bicycle race in Belgium. It was held on 9 March 2014, over a distance of 122.3 kilometres (76.0 miles) around Tielt-Winge. It was rated by the UCI as a 1.2 category race. The race was won by British rider Lizzie Armitstead of the Boels–Dolmans.

== Results ==
	Cyclist	Team	Time
1	Lizzie Armitstead (GBR)	Boels–Dolmans	3h 15' 43"
2	Emma Johansson (SWE)	Orica–AIS	s.t.
3	Audrey Cordon (FRA)	Hitec Products UCK	+ 4"
4	Thalita de Jong (NED)	Rabobank-Liv Woman Cycling Team	+ 4"
5	Sofie De Vuyst (BEL)	Futurumshop.nl–Zannata	+ 4"
6	Annemiek van Vleuten (NED)	Rabobank-Liv Woman Cycling Team	+ 4"
7	Jessie Daams (BEL)	Boels–Dolmans	+ 4"
8	Amanda Spratt (AUS)	Orica–AIS	+ 7"
9	Katarzyna Niewiadoma (POL)	Rabobank-Liv Woman Cycling Team	+ 9"
10	Elisa Longo Borghini (ITA)	Hitec Products UCK	+ 9"
