= 2016 Holland Hills Classic =

2016 Boels Rental Hills Classic
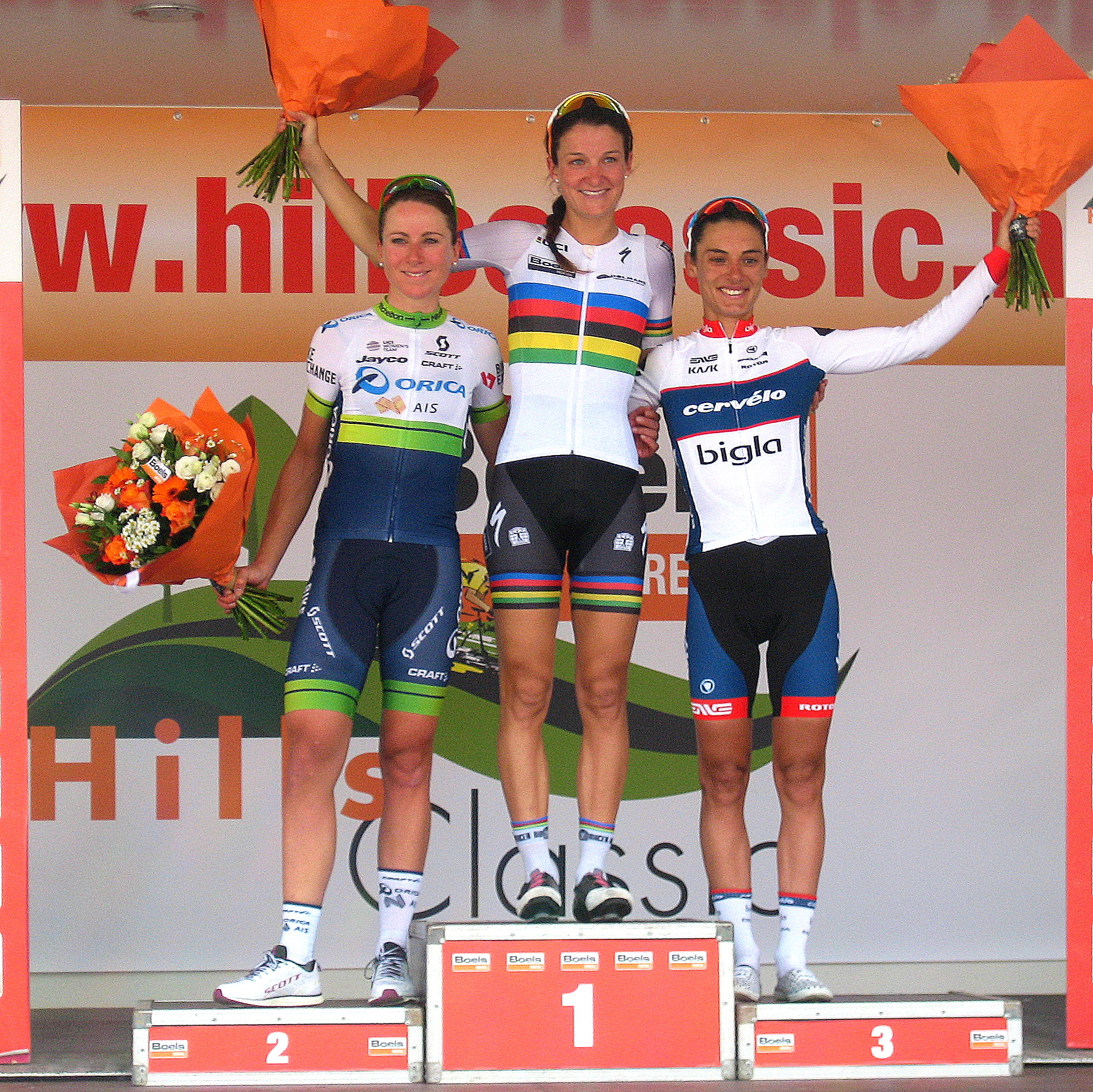
- Podium: 2 Van Vleuten, 1 Armitstead, 3 Moolman

Race details
- Dates: 27 May 2016
- Stages: 1
- Distance: 131.4 km (81.6 mi)
- Winning time: 3h 26' 38"

Results
	Winner	Lizzie Armitstead (GBR)	(Boels–Dolmans)
	Second	Annemiek van Vleuten (NED)	(Orica–AIS)
	Third	Ashleigh Moolman (RSA)	(Cervélo–Bigla Pro Cycling)

The 2016 Boels Rental Hills Classic is a one-day women's cycle race held in the Netherlands, from Sittard to Berg en Terblijt over 131.4 km on 27 May 2016. The race had a UCI rating of 1.1.

== Results ==
Result
Rank	Rider	Team	Time
1	Lizzie Armitstead (GBR)	Boels–Dolmans	3h 26' 38"
2	Annemiek van Vleuten (NED)	Orica–AIS	+ 0"
3	Ashleigh Moolman (RSA)	Cervélo–Bigla Pro Cycling	+ 0"
4	Marianne Vos (NED)	Rabobank-Liv Woman Cycling Team	+ 20"
5	Ellen van Dijk (NED)	Boels–Dolmans	+ 20"
6	Tatiana Guderzo (ITA)	Team Hitec Products	+ 2' 01"
7	Alice Maria Arzuffi (ITA)	Lensworld–Zannata	+ 2' 10"
8	Katrin Garfoot (AUS)	Orica–AIS	+ 2' 23"
9	Emma Johansson (SWE)	Wiggle High5	+ 2' 23"
10	Cecilie Uttrup Ludwig (DEN)	Team BMS BIRN	+ 2' 23"

== See also ==
- 2016 in women's road cycling
