= 2013 Holland Hills Classic =

2013 Boels Rental Hills Classic
KNWU Topcompetition

Race details
- Dates: 24 May 2013
- Stages: 1
- Distance: 120 km (75 mi)
- Winning time: 3h 11' 42"

Results
	Winner	Ashleigh Moolman (RSA)	(Lotto–Belisol Ladies)
	Second	Annemiek van Vleuten (NED)	(Rabobank-Liv Giant)
	Third	Lizzie Armitstead (GBR)	(Boels–Dolmans Cycling Team)

The 2013 Boels Rental Hills Classic is the 10th running of the Holland Hills Classic, a women's cycling event in Limburg the Netherlands. The race is a 1.2 UCI category race and will be held over a distance of 120 kilometres (74.6 miles) with the start and finish in Sittard on 24 May 2013.

== Results ==
	Cyclist	Team	Time
1	Ashleigh Moolman (RSA)	Lotto–Belisol Ladies	3h 11' 42"
2	Annemiek van Vleuten (NED)	Rabobank-Liv Giant	s.t.
3	Lizzie Armitstead (GBR)	Boels–Dolmans Cycling Team	s.t.
4	Anna van der Breggen (NED)	Sengers Ladies Cycling Team	s.t.
5	Ellen van Dijk (NED)	Specialized–lululemon	s.t.
6	Emma Johansson (SWE)	Orica–AIS	s.t.
7	Rossella Ratto (ITA)	Hitec Products UCK	s.t.
8	Jessie Daams (BEL)	Boels–Dolmans Cycling Team	s.t.
9	Sabrina Stultiens (NED)	Rabobank-Liv Giant	s.t.
10	Lucinda Brand (NED)	Rabobank-Liv Giant	s.t.

== See also ==
- 2013 in women's road cycling
