= 2016 Omloop Het Nieuwsblad (women's race) =

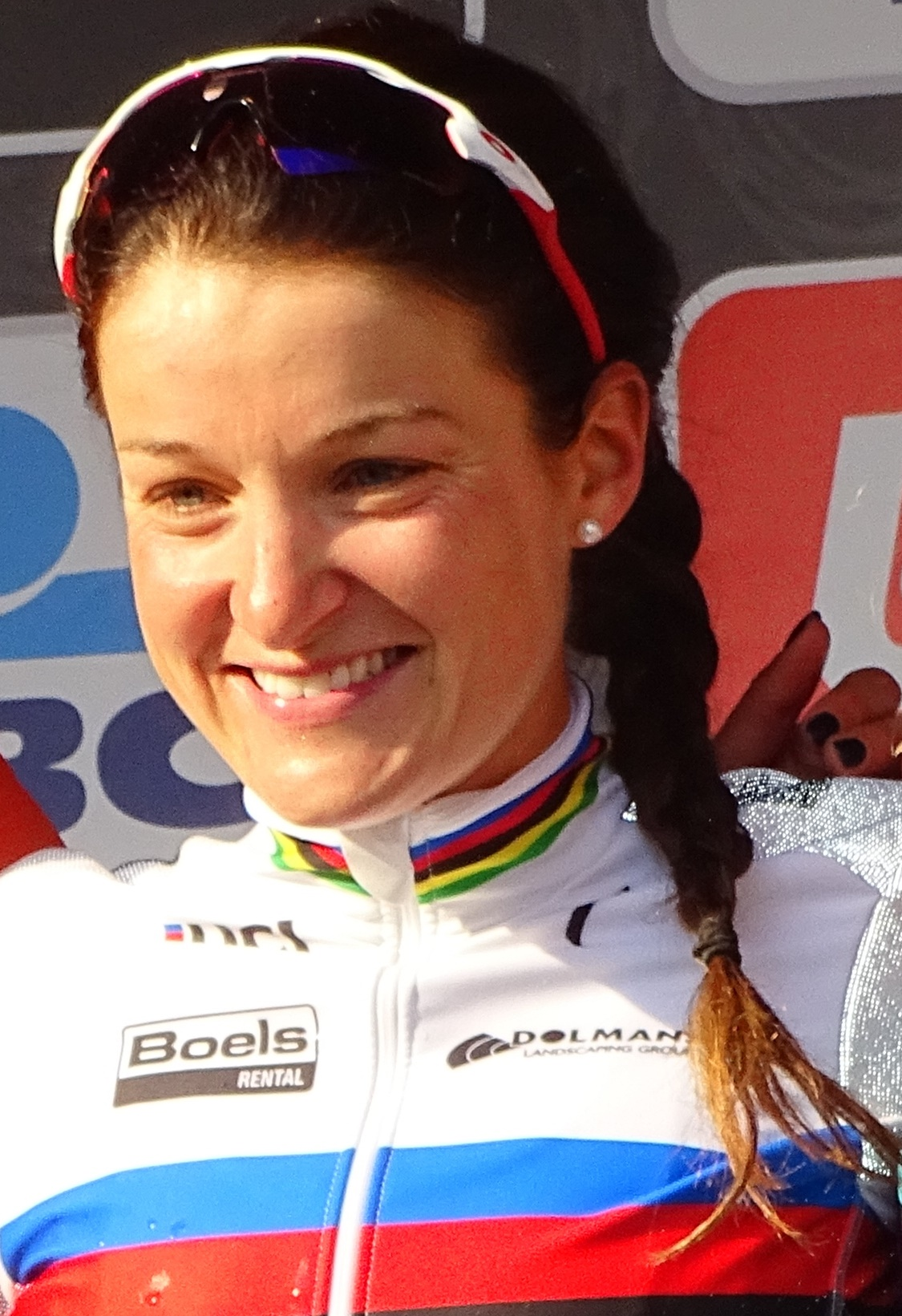
- Lizzie Armitstead won the race in the rainbow jersey

Race details
- Dates: 27 February 2016
- Stages: 1
- Distance: 124 km (77 mi)

Results
	Winner	Lizzie Armitstead (GBR)	(Boels–Dolmans)
	Second	Chantal Blaak (NED)	(Boels–Dolmans)
	Third	Tiffany Cromwell (AUS)	(Canyon–SRAM)

The 2016 Omloop Het Nieuwsblad was the 11th edition of the women's Omloop Het Nieuwsblad road cycling one-day race which was held on 27 February. The race started and finished in Ghent, addressing several climbs in the Flemish Ardennes and covering 123 kilometres (76 mi) in the province of East Flanders.

The race was won by the ruling world champion, Britain's Lizzie Armitstead, after a solo breakaway. Chantal Blaak won the sprint for second place ahead of Tiffany Cromwell. Armitstead's win marked the first time a world champion had graced the top step of the podium at the Belgian Semi-Classic.

== Race ==
Nearly 200 riders set out for the 123 km. A nervous but inactive first half gave way to non-stop attacks over the climbs and cobbles in the second half of the race. Jessie Daams (Lotto Soudal Ladies) rode away from the peloton for a short-lived solo effort and got a maximum advantage of 30 seconds over the peloton heading into the Wolvenberg. 40 km from the finish, the peloton pulled back Daams. On the Molenberg, Ellen van Dijk went away and opened the race again. She was caught on the Paddestraat cobbles.

Romy Kasper (Boels-Dolmans) led a trio of riders, part of a fragmented reduced bunch, just beyond the Paddestraat. Ten kilometres later with 20 km remaining, Armitstead and Elvin rode away. The duo stretched out their advantage to 45 seconds but Armitstead was doing most of the work. When Armitstead stopped cycling hard, they rode at a low speed for a while. When there was a slight drag in the road, Armitstead attacked and rode away from Gracie. Behind Armitstead, the chase was disorganised. Rabo-Liv and Wiggle High5 eventually collaborated on the front, but their efforts were not enough to close the gap. Future attacks proved unnecessary. Armitstead maintained her advantage all the way to the line. Behind her, Chantal Blaak delivered a one-two for Boels-Dolmans as she beat Tiffany Cromwell (Canyon-SRAM) in a reduced bunch sprint. The 22-rider chase group finished 29 seconds behind Armitstead.

== Aftermath ==
Ellen van Dijk crashed during the race. She finished the race in arrears due to a bike change. After the race at the hospital it appears she had one broken and some bruised ribs.

== Results ==
Final general classification
Rank	Rider	Team	Time
1	Lizzie Deignan (GBR)	Boels–Dolmans	3h 23' 05"
2	Chantal van den Broek-Blaak (NED)	Boels–Dolmans	+ 29"
3	Tiffany Cromwell (AUS)	Canyon//SRAM	+ 29"
4	Leah Kirchmann (CAN)	Team Liv–Plantur	+ 29"
5	Shelley Olds (USA)	Cylance Pro Cycling	+ 29"
6	Lucinda Brand (NED)	Rabobank-Liv Woman Cycling Team	+ 29"
7	Chloe Hosking (AUS)	Wiggle High5	+ 29"
8	Sarah Roy (AUS)	Orica–AIS	+ 29"
9	Susanna Zorzi (ITA)	Lotto–Soudal Ladies	+ 29"
10	Carmen Small (USA)	Cervélo–Bigla Pro Cycling	+ 29"

== See also ==
- 2016 in women's road cycling
