= 2015 GP de Plouay =

2015 GP de Plouay–Bretagne
2015 UCI Women's Road World Cup, race 10 of 10

Race details
- Dates: 29 August 2015
- Stages: 1
- Distance: 121.5 km (75.5 mi)
- Winning time: 3h 09' 26"

Results
	Winner	Lizzie Armitstead (GBR)	(Boels–Dolmans)
	Second	Emma Johansson (SWE)	(Orica–AIS)
	Third	Pauline Ferrand-Prévot (FRA)	(Rabobank-Liv Woman Cycling Team)

The 2015 GP de Plouay featured as the tenth and final round of the 2015 UCI Women's Road World Cup. It was held on 29 August 2015, in Plouay, France. Lizzie Armitstead (Boels–Dolmans) won, beating Emma Johansson (Orica–AIS) and Pauline Ferrand-Prévot (Rabobank-Liv Woman Cycling Team).

== Results ==
Result
Rank	Rider	Team	Time
1	Lizzie Armitstead (GBR)	Boels–Dolmans	3h 09' 26"
2	Emma Johansson (SWE)	Orica–GreenEDGE	+ 0"
3	Pauline Ferrand-Prévot (FRA)	Rabobank-Liv Woman Cycling Team	+ 0"
4	Ashleigh Moolman (RSA)	Bigla Pro Cycling Team	+ 0"
5	Claudia Lichtenberg (GER)	Team Liv–Plantur	+ 0"
6	Anna van der Breggen (NED)	Rabobank-Liv Woman Cycling Team	+ 0"
7	Elena Cecchini (ITA)	Lotto–Soudal Ladies	+ 0"
8	Evelyn Stevens (cyclist) (USA)	Boels–Dolmans	+ 0"
9	Elisa Longo Borghini (ITA)	Wiggle–Honda	+ 0"
10	Rasa Leleivytė (25x17px)		+ 38"
Source: ProCyclingStats

== World Cup Standings ==
Final individual ranking after 10 of 10 World Cup races
Rank	Rider	Team	Points
1	Lizzie Armitstead (GBR)	Boels–Dolmans	364
2	Anna van der Breggen (NED)	Rabobank-Liv Woman Cycling Team	385
3	Jolien D'Hoore (BEL)	Wiggle–Honda	391
4	Elisa Longo Borghini (ITA)	Wiggle–Honda	320
5	Lucinda Brand (NED)	Rabobank-Liv Woman Cycling Team	297
6	Pauline Ferrand-Prévot (FRA)	Rabobank-Liv Woman Cycling Team	175
7	Alena Amialiusik (BLR)	Velocio–SRAM	255
8	Giorgia Bronzini (ITA)	Wiggle–Honda	230
9	Ashleigh Moolman (RSA)	Bigla Pro Cycling Team	182
10	Annemiek van Vleuten (NED)	Bigla Pro Cycling Team	226
Source: Union Cycliste Internationale
