= Boels Rental =

Dutch equipment rental company

- Type: Private
- Founder: Pierre Boels Sr.
- Headquarters: Sittard, Netherlands
- Number of locations: 830
- Area served: 27 countries (Europe)
- Key people: Pierre Boels Jr. (Chief Executive Officer and Owner); René Olsthoorn (Chief Financial Officer); Reiant Mulder (Chief Operations Officer); Guy Cremer (Director Fleet Operations)
- Services: equipment rental
- Revenue: ▲€1,552,731,000 (2023); €1,469,753,000 (2022)
- Operating income: ▲€1,558,975,000 (2023); €1,474,901,000 (2022)
- Net income: ▼€69,295,000 (2023); €100,871,000 (2022)
- Total assets: ▲€2,908,794,000 (2023); €2,611,430 (2022)
- Total equity: ▲€515,578,000 (2023); €508,571,000 (2022)
- Owner: Pierre Boels Jr.
- Number of employees: 8,500
- Website: boels.com

Boels Rental (Dutch pronunciation: [buːls]) is an equipment rental company based in Sittard, Netherlands. According to its annual financial report and own website, as of 2024, the company has over 8,500 employees and over 830 branches in 27 European countries. Boels has over 865,000 rental items in its range.

== History ==
The family business was founded in 1977 by Pierre Boels Sr. and has been managed by his son Pierre Boels Jr. since 1996.

The company has been characterized by growth and numerous company takeovers since its founding. In 2020, the Scandinavian rental company Cramo was acquired for around 614 million euros. The takeover made Boels the second largest construction rental company in Europe.

In 2024, the Dutch aerial work platform (AWP) specialist Riwal was acquired, expanding the machine park by 20,000 items to a total of over 55,000 AWPs. The Riwal takeover also gave Boels locations in France and Spain for the first time, as well as its first non-European locations in India, Kazakhstan, UAE and Qatar.

== Sponsoring ==
From 2012 to 2020, Boels was (together with Dolmans Landscaping) title sponsor of the Boels–Dolmans Cycling Team, an UCI women's road cycling team. Key riders for the team included world champion and 2016 Olympic champion Anna van der Breggen and former world champions Chantal Blaak and Amalie Dideriksen. From 2013 Boels was also main sponsor of the Boels Ladies Tour and the Ardennes classics La Flèche Wallonne and Liège–Bastogne–Liège.
