= Vista Chinesa =

Coordinates: 22°58′23.37″S 43°14′59.12″W

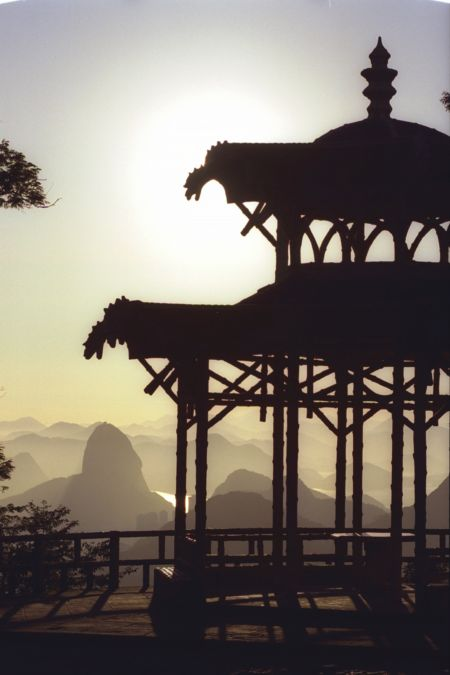
Vista Chinesa

The Vista Chinesa (Chinese Belvedere) is one of the belvederes of Rio de Janeiro, at the topmost of one of the roads that connect the Jardim Botânico area to the Parque Nacional & Floresta da Tijuca, known as the Estrada da Vista Chinesa.

== Tijuca National Park ==
Estrada da Vista Chinesa skirts the Mesa do Imperador viewpoint and at the Morro da Vista Chinesa (380m/1247ft) runs into Estrada Dona Castorina. From the top of the hill there are views of the Municipal Park, the botanical garden and a long stretch of the south coast.

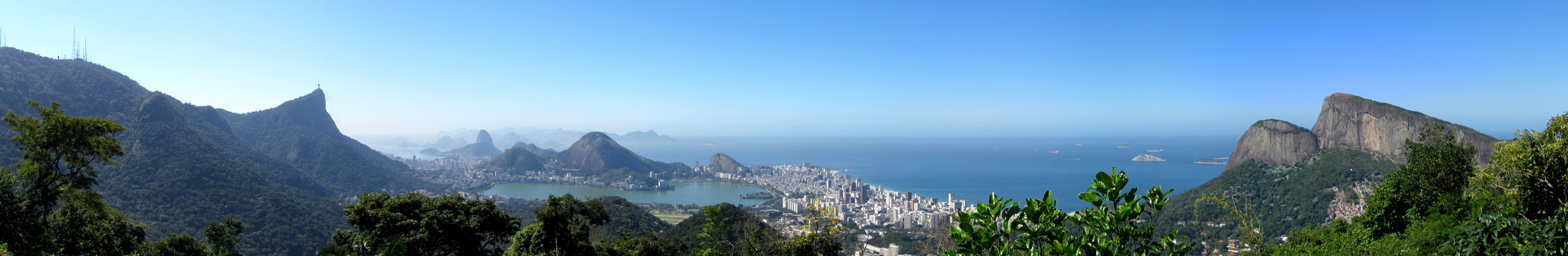
The south zone of Rio de Janeiro as seen from Vista Chinesa

== 2016 Summer Olympics ==
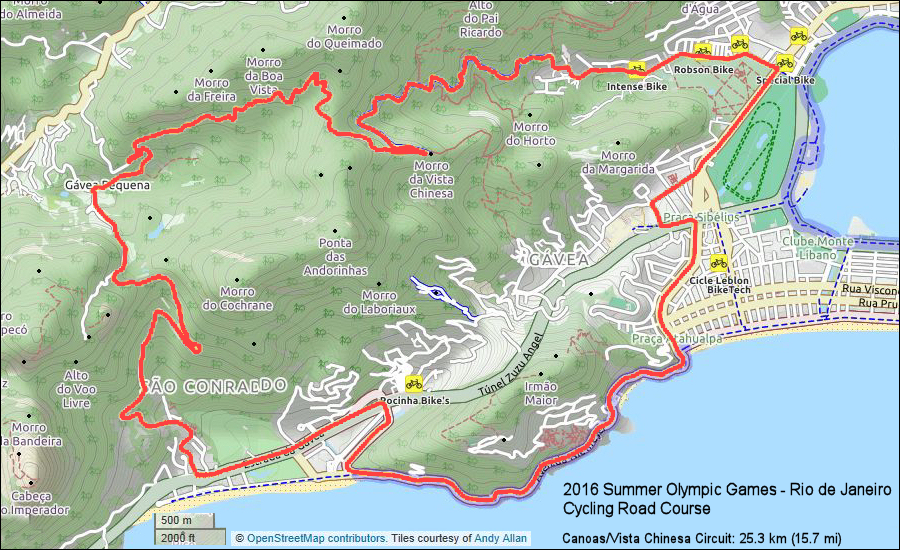

The men's and women's 2016 Olympic cycling road course started at Fort Copacabana and included the Vista Chinesa Circuit. This course sector features 2 of the 4 climbs in the 2016 route layout. The circuit ran clockwise from the Estr. da Gávea, first for the Canoas climb (Estr. das Canoas), then the Vista Chinesa climb (Estr. da Vista Chinesa) before descending back to Av. Niemeyer (the coastal stretch which connects the circuit to the main route).

The men's road race included three laps of the 25.7 km (15.9 mi) circuit for a total of 77.1 km of the 241.5 km race distance. The women's competition had one lap as part of their 141 km race distance.
