= List of teams and cyclists in the 2026 Giro d'Italia Women =

List of cyclists

The following is a list of teams and riders that participated in the 2026 Giro d'Italia Women.

== Teams ==
Twenty-one teams took part in the race. The teams were announced on 15 April 2026. All fourteen UCI Women's WorldTeams were automatically invited. They were joined by two UCI Women's ProTeams and five UCI Women's Continental Teams.

UCI Women's WorldTeams

- AG Insurance–Soudal
- Canyon//SRAM
- EF Education–Oatly
- FDJ United–Suez
- Fenix–Premier Tech
- Human Powered Health
- Lidl–Trek
- Liv AlUla Jayco
- Movistar Team
- Team Picnic–PostNL
- Team SD Worx–Protime
- UAE Team ADQ
- Uno-X Mobility
- Visma–Lease a Bike

UCI Women's Pro Teams

- Laboral Kutxa–Fundación Euskadi
- St. Michel–Preference Home–Auber93

UCI Women's Continental Teams

- Aromitalia Vaiano
- Isolmant–Premac–Vittoria
- Team Mendelspeck E-Work
- Top Girls Fassa Bortolo
- Vini Fantini–BePink

== Cyclists ==
Legend
No.	Starting number worn by the rider during the Giro
Pos.	Position in the general classification
Time	Deficit to the winner of the general classification
‡	Denotes riders born on or after 1 January 2004 eligible for the young rider classification
General classification	Denotes the winner of the general classification
Points classification	Denotes the winner of the points classification
Mountains classification	Denotes the winner of the mountains classification
Young rider classification	Denotes the winner of the young rider classification (eligibility indicated by ‡)
DNS	Denotes a rider who did not start a stage, followed by the stage before which she withdrew
DNF	Denotes a rider who did not finish a stage, followed by the stage in which she withdrew
DSQ	Denotes a rider who was disqualified from the race, followed by the stage in which this occurred
OTL	Denotes a rider finished outside the time limit, followed by the stage in which they did so
Ages correct as of Saturday 30 May 2026, the date on which the Giro began

=== By starting number ===
No.	Name	Nationality	Team	Age	Pos.	Time
1	Elisa Longo Borghini	Italy	UAE Team ADQ	34	4	+ 2' 44"
2	Alena Amialiusik	Belarus	UAE Team ADQ	37	50	+ 1h 08' 49"
3	Mavi García	Spain	UAE Team ADQ	42	20	+ 30' 18"
4	Eleonora Camilla Gasparrini	Italy	UAE Team ADQ	24	36	+ 50' 50"
5	Lara Gillespie	Ireland	UAE Team ADQ	25	57	+ 1h 15' 58"
6	Erica Magnaldi	Italy	UAE Team ADQ	33	28	+ 38' 06"
7	Silvia Persico	Italy	UAE Team ADQ	28	32	+ 47' 07"
11	Urška Žigart	Slovenia	AG Insurance–Soudal	29	8	+ 12' 39"
12	Mireia Benito	Spain	AG Insurance–Soudal	29	16	+ 23' 48"
13	Lore De Schepper ‡	Belgium	AG Insurance–Soudal	20	10	+ 13' 29"
14	Justine Ghekiere	Belgium	AG Insurance–Soudal	30	43	+ 1h 02' 41"
15	Ilse Pluimers	Netherlands	AG Insurance–Soudal	24	70	+ 1h 27' 22"
16	Julie Van De Velde	Belgium	AG Insurance–Soudal	32	51	+ 1h 10' 27"
17	Gladys Verhulst-Wild	France	AG Insurance–Soudal	29	97	+ 1h 43' 27"
21	Irene Affolati	Italy	Aromitalia Vaiano	24	DNF-9	–
22	Fanny Bonini	Italy	Aromitalia Vaiano	22	DNF-8	–
23	Maya Kingma	Netherlands	Aromitalia Vaiano	30	24	+ 35' 24"
24	Eleonora La Bella ‡	Italy	Aromitalia Vaiano	20	DNF-8	–
25	Argiro Milaki	Greece	Aromitalia Vaiano	33	DSQ-5	–
26	Valentina Venerucci	San Marino	Aromitalia Vaiano	32	DNF-8	–
27	Petra Zsankó	Hungary	Aromitalia Vaiano	25	100	+ 1h 47' 03"
31	Antonia Niedermaier	Germany	Canyon//SRAM	23	2	+ 30"
32	Chiara Consonni	Italy	Canyon//SRAM	26	64	+ 1h 22' 13"
33	Justyna Czapla ‡	Germany	Canyon//SRAM	22	62	+ 1h 20' 28"
34	Anastasiya Kolesava	Belarus	Canyon//SRAM	25	73	+ 1h 28' 49"
35	Cecilie Uttrup Ludwig	Denmark	Canyon//SRAM	30	18	+ 26' 49"
36	Soraya Paladin	Italy	Canyon//SRAM	33	76	+ 1h 31' 09"
37	Maike van der Duin	Netherlands	Canyon//SRAM	24	107	+ 1h 56' 38"
41	Magdeleine Vallieres	Canada	EF Education–Oatly	24	12	+ 14' 54"
42	Nina Berton	Luxembourg	EF Education–Oatly	24	66	+ 1h 24' 49"
43	Kristen Faulkner	United States	EF Education–Oatly	33	DNF-9	–
44	Stina Kagevi ‡	Sweden	EF Education–Oatly	20	63	+ 1h 21' 04"
45	Mirre Knaven ‡	Netherlands	EF Education–Oatly	21	71	+ 1h 28' 37"
46	Alexis Magner	United States	EF Education–Oatly	31	105	+ 1h 52' 39"
47	Alexandra Volstad ‡	Canada	EF Education–Oatly	20	106	+ 1h 54' 18"
51	Demi Vollering	Netherlands	FDJ United–Suez	29	1	29h 54' 19"
52	Célia Gery ‡	France	FDJ United–Suez	20	29	+ 41' 48"
53	Lauren Dickson	Great Britain	FDJ United–Suez	26	11	+ 13' 41"
54	Vittoria Guazzini	Italy	FDJ United–Suez	25	85	+ 1h 36' 24"
55	Amber Kraak	Netherlands	FDJ United–Suez	31	46	+ 1h 06' 03"
56	Eva van Agt	Netherlands	FDJ United–Suez	29	68	+ 1h 25' 40"
57	Ally Wollaston	New Zealand	FDJ United–Suez	25	77	+ 1h 31' 27"
61	Charlotte Kool	Netherlands	Fenix–Premier Tech	27	DNS-9	–
62	Millie Couzens	Great Britain	Fenix–Premier Tech	22	65	+ 1h 23' 37"
63	Mylène de Zoete	Netherlands	Fenix–Premier Tech	27	111	+ 2h 05' 59"
64	Evy Kuijpers	Netherlands	Fenix–Premier Tech	31	110	+ 2h 04' 44"
65	Flora Perkins	Great Britain	Fenix–Premier Tech	22	89	+ 1h 38' 57"
66	Christina Schweinberger	Austria	Fenix–Premier Tech	29	78	+ 1h 32' 04"
67	Marthe Truyen	Belgium	Fenix–Premier Tech	26	88	+ 1h 38' 45"
71	Barbara Malcotti	Italy	Human Powered Health	26	31	+ 43' 33"
72	Nina Buijsman	Netherlands	Human Powered Health	28	19	+ 28' 25"
73	Carlotta Cipressi	Italy	Human Powered Health	22	45	+ 1h 05' 58"
74	Maggie Coles-Lyster	Canada	Human Powered Health	27	95	+ 1h 42' 28"
75	Thalita de Jong	Netherlands	Human Powered Health	32	34	+ 49' 22"
76	Marit Raaijmakers	Netherlands	Human Powered Health	26	101	+ 1h 47' 25"
77	Lily Williams	United States	Human Powered Health	31	75	+ 1h 30' 56"
81	Anita Baima ‡	Italy	Isolmant–Premac–Vittoria	19	DSQ-5	–
82	Giulia Bisso	Italy	Isolmant–Premac–Vittoria	38	60	+ 1h 19' 28"
83	Lara Crestanello	Italy	Isolmant–Premac–Vittoria	24	108	+ 1h 58' 59"
84	Valeria Curnis	Italy	Isolmant–Premac–Vittoria	31	DNF-8	–
85	Chantal Pegolo ‡	Italy	Isolmant–Premac–Vittoria	19	DNF-9	–
86	Martina Silvestri	Italy	Isolmant–Premac–Vittoria	23	DNF-8	–
87	Valentina Zanzi ‡	Italy	Isolmant–Premac–Vittoria	21	DNF-5	–
91	Naia Amondarain	Spain	Laboral Kutxa–Fundación Euskadi	25	74	+ 1h 29' 13"
92	Yuliia Biriukova	Ukraine	Laboral Kutxa–Fundación Euskadi	28	39	+ 55' 27"
93	Sara Fiorin	Italy	Laboral Kutxa–Fundación Euskadi	22	DNF-8	–
94	Tiril Jørgensen	Norway	Laboral Kutxa–Fundación Euskadi	25	30	+ 43' 03"
95	Debora Silvestri	Italy	Laboral Kutxa–Fundación Euskadi	28	38	+ 52' 04"
96	Cristina Tonetti	Italy	Laboral Kutxa–Fundación Euskadi	23	98	+ 1h 44' 43"
97	Marjolein van 't Geloof	Netherlands	Laboral Kutxa–Fundación Euskadi	30	114	+ 2h 08' 29"
101	Niamh Fisher-Black	New Zealand	Lidl–Trek	25	5	+ 3' 26"
102	Elisa Balsamo	Italy	Lidl–Trek	28	58	+ 1h 16' 59"
103	Lucinda Brand	Netherlands	Lidl–Trek	36	27	+ 36' 43"
104	Isabella Holmgren ‡	Canada	Lidl–Trek	21	7	+ 7' 10"
105	Fleur Moors ‡	Belgium	Lidl–Trek	20	82	+ 1h 34' 07"
106	Amanda Spratt	Australia	Lidl–Trek	38	44	+ 1h 02' 48"
107	Shirin van Anrooij	Netherlands	Lidl–Trek	24	DNS-4	–
111	Monica Trinca Colonel	Italy	Liv AlUla Jayco	27	15	+ 22' 50"
112	Caroline Andersson	Sweden	Liv AlUla Jayco	24	37	+ 51' 52"
113	Georgia Baker	Australia	Liv AlUla Jayco	31	DNF-8	–
114	Nadia Gontova	Canada	Liv AlUla Jayco	25	17	+ 25' 33"
115	Silke Smulders	Netherlands	Liv AlUla Jayco	25	DNF-9	–
116	Quinty Ton	Netherlands	Liv AlUla Jayco	27	42	+ 1h 00' 28"
117	Matilde Vitillo	Italy	Liv AlUla Jayco	25	69	+ 1h 26' 17"
121	Marlen Reusser	Switzerland	Movistar Team	34	13	+ 16' 50"
122	Francesca Barale	Italy	Movistar Team	23	47	+ 1h 07' 18"
123	Aude Biannic	France	Movistar Team	35	53	+ 1h 12' 31"
124	Cat Ferguson ‡	Great Britain	Movistar Team	20	DNF-1	–
125	Ana Vitória Magalhães	Brazil	Movistar Team	25	33	+ 47' 24"
126	Mareille Meijer	Netherlands	Movistar Team	31	80	+ 1h 33' 47"
127	Arlenis Sierra	Cuba	Movistar Team	33	72	+ 1h 28' 38"
131	Clara Emond	Canada	St. Michel–Preference Home–Auber93	29	DNF-5	–
132	Alicia González	Spain	St. Michel–Preference Home–Auber93	31	104	+ 1h 52' 19"
133	Alison Jackson	Canada	St. Michel–Preference Home–Auber93	37	99	+ 1h 46' 47"
134	Karolina Kumięga	Poland	St. Michel–Preference Home–Auber93	27	DNF-2	–
135	Émilie Morier	France	St. Michel–Preference Home–Auber93	29	22	+ 33' 17"
136	Solène Muller	France	St. Michel–Preference Home–Auber93	22	49	+ 1h 08' 18"
137	Caroline Wreszin	United States	St. Michel–Preference Home–Auber93	24	84	+ 1h 35' 53"
141	Camilla Bezzone ‡	Italy	Team Mendelspeck E-Work	19	115	+ 2h 22' 34"
142	Eleonora Deotto ‡	Italy	Team Mendelspeck E-Work	18	113	+ 2h 08' 09"
143	Giulia Giuliani	Italy	Team Mendelspeck E-Work	23	59	+ 1h 19' 01"
144	Ilaria Marinetto ‡	Italy	Team Mendelspeck E-Work	19	DNF-8	–
145	Katelyn Nicholson	Australia	Team Mendelspeck E-Work	26	DNF-8	–
146	Sara Segala ‡	Italy	Team Mendelspeck E-Work	18	OTL-4	–
147	Giorgia Serena ‡	Italy	Team Mendelspeck E-Work	22	DNF-8	–
151	Rachele Barbieri	Italy	Team Picnic–PostNL	29	96	+ 1h 42' 30"
152	Robyn Clay	Great Britain	Team Picnic–PostNL	22	109	+ 1h 59' 50"
153	Pfeiffer Georgi	Great Britain	Team Picnic–PostNL	25	61	+ 1h 19' 41"
154	Gaia Masetti	Italy	Team Picnic–PostNL	24	102	+ 1h 49' 03"
155	Josie Nelson	Great Britain	Team Picnic–PostNL	24	92	+ 1h 41' 40"
156	Mara Roldan ‡	Canada	Team Picnic–PostNL	22	DNS-4	–
157	Becky Storrie	Great Britain	Team Picnic–PostNL	27	54	+ 1h 13' 04"
161	Anna van der Breggen	Netherlands	Team SD Worx–Protime	36	3	+ 1' 37"
162	Valentina Cavallar	Austria	Team SD Worx–Protime	25	9	+ 13' 12"
163	Elena Cecchini	Italy	Team SD Worx–Protime	34	87	+ 1h 37' 32"
164	Femke Gerritse	Netherlands	Team SD Worx–Protime	25	55	+ 1h 14' 35"
165	Barbara Guarischi	Italy	Team SD Worx–Protime	35	DNF-9	–
166	Mikayla Harvey	New Zealand	Team SD Worx–Protime	27	DNS-4	–
167	Lorena Wiebes	Netherlands	Team SD Worx–Protime	27	DSQ-1	–
171	Marion Bunel ‡	Netherlands	Visma–Lease a Bike	21	26	+ 36' 23"
172	Viktória Chladoňová ‡	Slovakia	Visma–Lease a Bike	19	23	+ 34' 34"
173	Femke de Vries	Netherlands	Visma–Lease a Bike	32	6	+ 5' 07"
174	Daniek Hengeveld	Netherlands	Visma–Lease a Bike	23	67	+ 1h 25' 32"
175	Rosita Reijnhout ‡	Netherlands	Visma–Lease a Bike	22	25	+ 36' 11"
176	Nienke Veenhoven ‡	Netherlands	Visma–Lease a Bike	22	DNF-8	–
177	Margaux Vigié	France	Visma–Lease a Bike	30	DNS-7	–
181	Elisa De Vallier ‡	Italy	Top Girls Fassa Bortolo	21	94	+ 1h 42' 19"
182	Sara Luccon ‡	Italy	Top Girls Fassa Bortolo	20	93	+ 1h 42' 04"
183	Marta Pavesi ‡	Italy	Top Girls Fassa Bortolo	20	103	+ 1h 51' 31"
184	Chiara Reghini	Italy	Top Girls Fassa Bortolo	23	41	+ 57' 58"
185	Irma Siri ‡	Italy	Top Girls Fassa Bortolo	19	DNF-8	–
186	Sharon Spimi	Italy	Top Girls Fassa Bortolo	29	86	+ 1h 36' 30"
187	Alessia Zambelli ‡	Italy	Top Girls Fassa Bortolo	20	91	+ 1h 40' 57"
191	Susanne Andersen	Norway	Uno-X Mobility	27	112	+ 2h 06' 10"
192	Teuntje Beekhuis	Netherlands	Uno-X Mobility	30	90	+ 1h 40' 02"
193	Marthe Berg Edseth	Norway	Uno-X Mobility	27	48	+ 1h 07' 23"
194	Sigrid Ytterhus Haugset	Norway	Uno-X Mobility	27	14	+ 19' 13"
195	Mie Bjørndal Ottestad	Norway	Uno-X Mobility	28	21	+ 32' 11"
196	Alessia Vigilia	Italy	Uno-X Mobility	26	52	+ 1h 11' 32"
197	Linda Zanetti	Switzerland	Uno-X Mobility	24	DNF-8	–
201	Gaia Segato ‡	Italy	Vini Fantini–BePink	22	35	+ 49' 51"
202	Sofia Arici	Italy	Vini Fantini–BePink	23	40	+ 56' 45"
203	Andrea Casagranda ‡	Italy	Vini Fantini–BePink	21	79	+ 1h 32' 51"
204	Marina Garau	Spain	Vini Fantini–BePink	23	81	+ 1h 34' 03"
205	Fariba Hashimi	Afghanistan	Vini Fantini–BePink	23	56	+ 1h 15' 44"
206	Nora Jenčušová	Slovakia	Vini Fantini–BePink	24	DNF-8	–
207	Irene Cagnazzo ‡	Italy	Vini Fantini–BePink	20	83	+ 1h 34' 55"

=== By team ===
(United Arab Emirates) UAE Team ADQ (UAD)
No.	Rider	Pos.
1	Elisa Longo Borghini (ITA)	4
2	Alena Amialiusik (BLR)	50
3	Mavi García (ESP)	20
4	Eleonora Camilla Gasparrini (ITA)	36
5	Lara Gillespie (IRL)	57
6	Erica Magnaldi (ITA)	28
7	Silvia Persico (ITA)	32

(Belgium) AG Insurance–Soudal (AGS)
No.	Rider	Pos.
11	Urška Žigart (SLO)	8
12	Mireia Benito (ESP)	16
13	Lore De Schepper (BEL)	10
14	Justine Ghekiere (BEL)	43
15	Ilse Pluimers (NED)	70
16	Julie Van De Velde (BEL)	51
17	Gladys Verhulst-Wild (FRA)	97

(Italy) Aromitalia Vaiano (VAI)
No.	Rider	Pos.
21	Irene Affolati (ITA)	DNF-9
22	Fanny Bonini (ITA)	DNF-8
23	Maya Kingma (NED)	24
24	Eleonora La Bella (ITA)	DNF-8
25	Argiro Milaki (GRE)	DSQ-5
26	Valentina Venerucci (SMR)	DNF-8
27	Petra Zsankó (HUN)	100

(Germany) Canyon//SRAM (CSZ)
No.	Rider	Pos.
31	Antonia Niedermaier (GER)	2
32	Chiara Consonni (ITA)	64
33	Justyna Czapla (GER)	62
34	Anastasiya Kolesava (BLR)	73
35	Cecilie Uttrup Ludwig (DEN)	18
36	Soraya Paladin (ITA)	76
37	Maike van der Duin (NED)	107

(United States) EF Education–Oatly (EFO)
No.	Rider	Pos.
41	Magdeleine Vallieres (CAN)	12
42	Nina Berton (LUX)	66
43	Kristen Faulkner (USA)	DNF-9
44	Stina Kagevi (SWE)	63
45	Mirre Knaven (NED)	71
46	Alexis Magner (USA)	105
47	Alexandra Volstad (CAN)	106

(France) FDJ United–Suez (TFS)
No.	Rider	Pos.
51	Demi Vollering (NED)	1
52	Célia Gery (FRA)	29
53	Lauren Dickson (GBR)	11
54	Vittoria Guazzini (ITA)	85
55	Amber Kraak (NED)	46
56	Eva van Agt (NED)	68
57	Ally Wollaston (NZL)	77

(Belgium) Fenix–Premier Tech (FPC)
No.	Rider	Pos.
61	Charlotte Kool (NED)	DNS-9
62	Millie Couzens (GBR)	65
63	Mylène de Zoete (NED)	111
64	Evy Kuijpers (NED)	110
65	Flora Perkins (GBR)	89
66	Christina Schweinberger (AUT)	78
67	Marthe Truyen (BEL)	88

(United States) Human Powered Health (HPH)
No.	Rider	Pos.
71	Barbara Malcotti (ITA)	31
72	Nina Buijsman (NED)	19
73	Carlotta Cipressi (ITA)	45
74	Maggie Coles-Lyster (CAN)	95
75	Thalita de Jong (NED)	34
76	Marit Raaijmakers (NED)	101
77	Lily Williams (USA)	75

(Italy) Isolmant–Premac–Vittoria (SBT)
No.	Rider	Pos.
81	Anita Baima (ITA)	DSQ-5
82	Giulia Bisso (ITA)	60
83	Lara Crestanello (ITA)	108
84	Valeria Curnis (ITA)	DNF-8
85	Chantal Pegolo (ITA)	DNF-9
86	Martina Silvestri (ITA)	DNF-8
87	Valentina Zanzi (ITA)	DNF-5

(Spain) Laboral Kutxa–Fundación Euskadi (LKF)
No.	Rider	Pos.
91	Naia Amondarain (ESP)	74
92	Yuliia Biriukova (UKR)	39
93	Sara Fiorin (ITA)	DNF-8
94	Tiril Jørgensen (NOR)	30
95	Debora Silvestri (ITA)	38
96	Cristina Tonetti (ITA)	98
97	Marjolein van 't Geloof (NED)	114

(Germany) Lidl–Trek (LTK)
No.	Rider	Pos.
101	Niamh Fisher-Black (NZL)	5
102	Elisa Balsamo (ITA)	58
103	Lucinda Brand (NED)	27
104	Isabella Holmgren (CAN)	7
105	Fleur Moors (BEL)	82
106	Amanda Spratt (AUS)	44
107	Shirin van Anrooij (NED)	DNS-4

(Australia) Liv AlUla Jayco (LIV)
No.	Rider	Pos.
111	Monica Trinca Colonel (ITA)	15
112	Caroline Andersson (SWE)	37
113	Georgia Baker (AUS)	DNF-8
114	Nadia Gontova (CAN)	17
115	Silke Smulders (NED)	DNF-9
116	Quinty Ton (NED)	42
117	Matilde Vitillo (ITA)	69

(Spain) Movistar Team (MOV)
No.	Rider	Pos.
121	Marlen Reusser (SUI)	13
122	Francesca Barale (ITA)	47
123	Aude Biannic (FRA)	53
124	Cat Ferguson (GBR)	DNF-1
125	Ana Vitória Magalhães (BRA)	33
126	Mareille Meijer (NED)	80
127	Arlenis Sierra (CUB)	72

(France) St. Michel–Preference Home–Auber93 (AUB)
No.	Rider	Pos.
131	Clara Emond (CAN)	DNF-5
132	Alicia González (ESP)	104
133	Alison Jackson (CAN)	99
134	Karolina Kumięga (POL)	DNF-2
135	Émilie Morier (FRA)	22
136	Solène Muller (FRA)	49
137	Caroline Wreszin (USA)	84

(Italy) Team Mendelspeck E-Work (MDS)
No.	Rider	Pos.
141	Camilla Bezzone (ITA)	115
142	Eleonora Deotto (ITA)	113
143	Giulia Giuliani (ITA)	59
144	Ilaria Marinetto (ITA)	DNF-8
145	Katelyn Nicholson (AUS)	DNF-8
146	Sara Segala (ITA)	OTL-4
147	Giorgia Serena (ITA)	DNF-8

(Netherlands) Team Picnic–PostNL (TPP)
No.	Rider	Pos.
151	Rachele Barbieri (ITA)	96
152	Robyn Clay (GBR)	109
153	Pfeiffer Georgi (GBR)	61
154	Gaia Masetti (ITA)	102
155	Josie Nelson (GBR)	92
156	Mara Roldan (CAN)	DNS-4
157	Becky Storrie (GBR)	54

(Netherlands) Team SD Worx–Protime (SDW)
No.	Rider	Pos.
161	Anna van der Breggen (NED)	3
162	Valentina Cavallar (AUT)	9
163	Elena Cecchini (ITA)	87
164	Femke Gerritse (NED)	55
165	Barbara Guarischi (ITA)	DNF-9
166	Mikayla Harvey (NZL)	DNS-4
167	Lorena Wiebes (NED)	DSQ-1

(Netherlands) Visma–Lease a Bike (TVL)
No.	Rider	Pos.
171	Marion Bunel (FRA)	26
172	Viktória Chladoňová (SVK)	23
173	Femke de Vries (NED)	6
174	Daniek Hengeveld (NED)	67
175	Rosita Reijnhout (NED)	25
176	Nienke Veenhoven (NED)	DNF-8
177	Margaux Vigié (FRA)	DNS-7

(Italy) Top Girls Fassa Bortolo (TOP)
No.	Rider	Pos.
181	Elisa De Vallier (ITA)	94
182	Sara Luccon (ITA)	93
183	Marta Pavesi (ITA)	103
184	Chiara Reghini (ITA)	41
185	Irma Siri (ITA)	DNF-8
186	Sharon Spimi (ITA)	86
187	Alessia Zambelli (ITA)	91

(Norway) Uno-X Mobility (UXM)
No.	Rider	Pos.
191	Susanne Andersen (NOR)	112
192	Teuntje Beekhuis (NED)	90
193	Marte Berg Edseth (NOR)	48
194	Sigrid Ytterhus Haugset (NOR)	14
195	Mie Bjørndal Ottestad (NOR)	21
196	Alessia Vigilia (ITA)	52
197	Linda Zanetti (SUI)	DNF-8

(Italy) Vini Fantini–BePink (BPK)
No.	Rider	Pos.
201	Gaia Segato (ITA)	35
202	Sofia Arici (ITA)	40
203	Andrea Casagranda (ITA)	79
204	Marina Garau (ESP)	81
205	Fariba Hashimi (AFG)	56
206	Nora Jenčušová (SVK)	DNF-8
207	Irene Cagnazzo (ITA)	83

=== By nationality ===
Country	No. of riders	Finished	Stage wins
Afghanistan	1	1	
Australia	3	1	
Austria	2	2	
Belarus	2	2	
Belgium	5	5	
Brazil	1	1	
Canada	8	6	
Cuba	1	1	
Denmark	1	1	
France	7	6	1 (Célia Gery)
Germany	2	2	
Great Britain	8	7	
Greece	1	0	
Hungary	1	1	
Ireland	1	1	
Italy	48	34	5 (Elisa Balsamo x4, Elisa Longo Borghini)
Luxembourg	1	1	
Netherlands	27	22	3 (Anna van der Breggen, Demi Vollering x2)
New Zealand	3	2	
Norway	5	5	
Poland	1	0	
San Marino	1	0	
Slovakia	2	1	
Slovenia	1	1	
Spain	5	5	
Sweden	2	2	
Switzerland	2	1	
Ukraine	1	1	
United States	4	3	
Total	147	115	9
