= 2026 Giro d'Italia Women, Stage 1 to Stage 9 =

Stage of cycling race

The 2026 Giro d'Italia Women was the 37th edition of the Giro d'Italia Women, a women's road cycling stage race in Italy. The race took place from 30 May to 7 June 2026.

== Classification standings ==
Legend
| Denotes the leader of the general classification | Denotes the leader of the mountains classification |
| Denotes the leader of the points classification | Denotes the leader of the young rider classification |

== Stage 1 ==
30 May 2026 — Cesenatico to Ravenna, 139 km (86 mi)

The first stage was to Ravenna in the Emilia-Romagna region, with Lorena Wiebes (Team SD Worx–Protime) winning the stage in a sprint finish ahead of Elisa Balsamo (Lidl–Trek). Wiebes was later disqualified from the race as her bike was 20 grams (0.044 lb) under the weight limit of 6.8 kilograms (15 lb). Balsamo was awarded the stage win instead, and therefore led the GC.

Stage 1 Result
| Rank | Rider | Team | Time |
|---|---|---|---|
| 1 | Elisa Balsamo (ITA) | Lidl–Trek | 3h 18' 22" |
| 2 | Lara Gillespie (IRL) | UAE Team ADQ | + 0" |
| 3 | Chiara Consonni (ITA) | Canyon//SRAM | + 0" |
| 4 | Georgia Baker (AUS) | Liv AlUla Jayco | + 0" |
| 5 | Charlotte Kool (NED) | Fenix–Premier Tech | + 0" |
| 6 | Linda Zanetti (SUI) | Uno-X Mobility | + 0" |
| 7 | Gladys Verhulst-Wild (FRA) | AG Insurance–Soudal | + 0" |
| 8 | Célia Gery (FRA) | FDJ United–Suez | + 0" |
| 9 | Lily Williams (USA) | Human Powered Health | + 0" |
| 10 | Alessia Zambelli (ITA) | Top Girls Fassa Bortolo | + 0" |

General classification after Stage 1
| Rank | Rider | Team | Time |
|---|---|---|---|
| 1 | Elisa Balsamo (ITA) | Lidl–Trek | 3h 18' 12" |
| 2 | Lara Gillespie (IRL) | UAE Team ADQ | + 4" |
| 3 | Chiara Consonni (ITA) | Canyon//SRAM | + 6" |
| 4 | Georgia Baker (AUS) | Liv AlUla Jayco | + 10" |
| 5 | Charlotte Kool (NED) | Fenix–Premier Tech | + 10" |
| 6 | Linda Zanetti (SUI) | Uno-X Mobility | + 10" |
| 7 | Gladys Verhulst-Wild (FRA) | AG Insurance–Soudal | + 10" |
| 8 | Célia Gery (FRA) | FDJ United–Suez | + 10" |
| 9 | Lily Williams (USA) | Human Powered Health | + 10" |
| 10 | Alessia Zambelli (ITA) | Top Girls Fassa Bortolo | + 10" |

== Stage 2 ==
31 May 2026 — Roncade H-Farm to Caorle, 146 km (91 mi)

The race moved to the Veneto region, with the second stage finishing in Caorle. Balsamo won the stage in a sprint finish, retaining her lead in the GC, with a 20 second lead over most of the peloton thanks to bonus seconds.

Stage 2 Result
| Rank | Rider | Team | Time |
|---|---|---|---|
| 1 | Elisa Balsamo (ITA) | Lidl–Trek | 3h 57' 49" |
| 2 | Lara Gillespie (IRL) | UAE Team ADQ | + 0" |
| 3 | Chiara Consonni (ITA) | Canyon//SRAM | + 0" |
| 4 | Charlotte Kool (NED) | Fenix–Premier Tech | + 0" |
| 5 | Barbara Guarischi (ITA) | Team SD Worx–Protime | + 0" |
| 6 | Arlenis Sierra (CUB) | Movistar Team | + 0" |
| 7 | Maggie Coles-Lyster (CAN) | Human Powered Health | + 0" |
| 8 | Alessia Zambelli (ITA) | Top Girls Fassa Bortolo | + 0" |
| 9 | Nienke Veenhoven (NED) | Visma–Lease a Bike | + 0" |
| 10 | Linda Zanetti (SUI) | Uno-X Mobility | + 0" |

General classification after Stage 2
| Rank | Rider | Team | Time |
|---|---|---|---|
| 1 | Elisa Balsamo (ITA) | Lidl–Trek | 7h 15' 51" |
| 2 | Lara Gillespie (IRL) | UAE Team ADQ | + 8" |
| 3 | Chiara Consonni (ITA) | Canyon//SRAM | + 12" |
| 4 | Charlotte Kool (NED) | Fenix–Premier Tech | + 20" |
| 5 | Linda Zanetti (SUI) | Uno-X Mobility | + 20" |
| 6 | Georgia Baker (AUS) | Liv AlUla Jayco | + 20" |
| 7 | Alessia Zambelli (ITA) | Top Girls Fassa Bortolo | + 20" |
| 8 | Arlenis Sierra (CUB) | Movistar Team | + 20" |
| 9 | Gladys Verhulst-Wild (FRA) | AG Insurance–Soudal | + 20" |
| 10 | Cristina Tonetti (ITA) | Laboral Kutxa–Fundación Euskadi | + 20" |

== Stage 3 ==
1 June 2026 — Bibione to Buja, 154 km (96 mi)

The third stage was a hilly course, finishing in Buja in the Friuli-Venezia Giulia region. On the climbs, GC contenders split the peloton, with a smaller group heading to the finish. In the uphill sprint to the finish line, Balsamo won her third stage ahead of Lily Williams (Human Powered Health) and Femke Gerritse (Team SD Worx–Protime). Balsamo maintained her lead in the GC, now around 30 seconds over most of the peloton.

Stage 3 Result
| Rank | Rider | Team | Time |
|---|---|---|---|
| 1 | Elisa Balsamo (ITA) | Lidl–Trek | 3h 43' 43" |
| 2 | Lily Williams (USA) | Human Powered Health | + 0" |
| 3 | Femke Gerritse (NED) | Team SD Worx–Protime | + 0" |
| 4 | Elisa Longo Borghini (ITA) | UAE Team ADQ | + 0" |
| 5 | Silvia Persico (ITA) | UAE Team ADQ | + 0" |
| 6 | Pfeiffer Georgi (GBR) | Team Picnic–PostNL | + 0" |
| 7 | Marlen Reusser (SUI) | Movistar Team | + 0" |
| 8 | Célia Gery (FRA) | FDJ United–Suez | + 0" |
| 9 | Cecilie Uttrup Ludwig (DEN) | Canyon//SRAM | + 0" |
| 10 | Émilie Morier (FRA) | St. Michel–Preference Home–Auber93 | + 0" |

General classification after Stage 3
| Rank | Rider | Team | Time |
|---|---|---|---|
| 1 | Elisa Balsamo (ITA) | Lidl–Trek | 10h 59' 24" |
| 2 | Lily Williams (USA) | Human Powered Health | + 24" |
| 3 | Elisa Longo Borghini (ITA) | UAE Team ADQ | + 30" |
| 4 | Margaux Vigié (FRA) | Visma–Lease a Bike | + 30" |
| 5 | Célia Gery (FRA) | FDJ United–Suez | + 30" |
| 6 | Anna van der Breggen (NED) | Team SD Worx–Protime | + 30" |
| 7 | Niamh Fisher-Black (NZL) | Lidl–Trek | + 30" |
| 8 | Silvia Persico (ITA) | UAE Team ADQ | + 30" |
| 9 | Demi Vollering (NED) | FDJ United–Suez | + 30" |
| 10 | Lauren Dickson (GBR) | FDJ United–Suez | + 30" |

== Stage 4 ==
2 June 2026 — Belluno to Nevegal, 12.7 km (7.9 mi) (ITT)

The fourth stage of the race was a 12.7 km-long (7.9 mi) individual time trial from Belluno to Nevegal in the Veneto region. The uphill course included a 7.4 km (4.6 mi) climb with an average gradient of 8.2% and a maximum gradient of 14%. The fastest time of 31 minutes 38 minutes was set by Anna van der Breggen, with Marlen Reusser in second place, 1 minute 4 seconds behind. Demi Vollering finished third, six seconds slower. Van der Breggen therefore took the lead in the GC, with Balsamo falling to 56th overall. Van der Breggen last wore the maglia rosa of the leaders jersey on her way to victory at the 2021 edition of the race.

Stage 4 Result
| Rank | Rider | Team | Time |
|---|---|---|---|
| 1 | Anna van der Breggen (NED) | Team SD Worx–Protime | 31' 38" |
| 2 | Marlen Reusser (SUI) | Movistar Team | + 1' 04" |
| 3 | Demi Vollering (NED) | FDJ United–Suez | + 1' 10" |
| 4 | Antonia Niedermaier (GER) | Canyon//SRAM | + 1' 26" |
| 5 | Monica Trinca Colonel (ITA) | Liv AlUla Jayco | + 1' 31" |
| 6 | Lauren Dickson (GBR) | FDJ United–Suez | + 1' 38" |
| 7 | Femke de Vries (NED) | Visma–Lease a Bike | + 1' 39" |
| 8 | Elisa Longo Borghini (ITA) | UAE Team ADQ | + 1' 51" |
| 9 | Urška Žigart (SLO) | AG Insurance–Soudal | + 1' 54" |
| 10 | Isabella Holmgren (CAN) | Lidl–Trek | + 1' 55" |

General classification after Stage 4
| Rank | Rider | Team | Time |
|---|---|---|---|
| 1 | Anna van der Breggen (NED) | Team SD Worx–Protime | 11h 31' 32" |
| 2 | Marlen Reusser (SUI) | Movistar Team | + 1' 04" |
| 3 | Demi Vollering (NED) | FDJ United–Suez | + 1' 10" |
| 4 | Antonia Niedermaier (GER) | Canyon//SRAM | + 1' 26" |
| 5 | Monica Trinca Colonel (ITA) | Liv AlUla Jayco | + 1' 31" |
| 6 | Lauren Dickson (GBR) | FDJ United–Suez | + 1' 38" |
| 7 | Femke de Vries (NED) | Visma–Lease a Bike | + 1' 39" |
| 8 | Elisa Longo Borghini (ITA) | UAE Team ADQ | + 1' 51" |
| 9 | Urška Žigart (SLO) | AG Insurance–Soudal | + 1' 54" |
| 10 | Isabella Holmgren (CAN) | Lidl–Trek | + 1' 55" |

== Stage 5 ==
3 June 2026 — Longarone to Santo Stefano di Cadore, 138 km (86 mi)

The fifth stage remained in the Veneto region, with a 138 km (86 mi) mountain stage in the Dolomites with 4 categorised climbs including the 1st category Passo Tre Croci. On the last climb of the day, Vollering, van der Breggen, Antonia Niedermaier (Canyon//SRAM) and Isabella Holmgren (Lidl–Trek) formed a group of four riders. By the top of the climb, they had an advantage of 40 seconds over Longo Borghini and Niamh Fisher-Black (Lidl–Trek), with Reusser 15 seconds further behind. Descending to the finish, the gap tightened however the group of four stayed away. Vollering took her first Giro d'Italia Women stage win by outsprinting van der Breggen and Niedermaier. Van der Breggen maintained her lead in the GC, with Vollering gaining 10 seconds to move to second overall. Reusser finished 53 seconds behind Vollering, falling to fifth overall – thereby elevating Niedermaier moved to third overall.

Stage 5 Result
| Rank | Rider | Team | Time |
|---|---|---|---|
| 1 | Demi Vollering (NED) | FDJ United–Suez | 4h 23' 47" |
| 2 | Anna van der Breggen (NED) | Team SD Worx–Protime | + 0" |
| 3 | Antonia Niedermaier (GER) | Canyon//SRAM | + 0" |
| 4 | Isabella Holmgren (CAN) | Lidl–Trek | + 2" |
| 5 | Elisa Longo Borghini (ITA) | UAE Team ADQ | + 15" |
| 6 | Niamh Fisher-Black (NZL) | Lidl–Trek | + 15" |
| 7 | Marlen Reusser (SUI) | Movistar Team | + 53" |
| 8 | Magdeleine Vallieres (CAN) | EF Education–Oatly | + 53" |
| 9 | Femke de Vries (NED) | Visma–Lease a Bike | + 53" |
| 10 | Lore De Schepper (BEL) | AG Insurance–Soudal | + 56" |

General classification after Stage 5
| Rank | Rider | Team | Time |
|---|---|---|---|
| 1 | Anna van der Breggen (NED) | Team SD Worx–Protime | 15h 55' 13" |
| 2 | Demi Vollering (NED) | FDJ United–Suez | + 1' 00" |
| 3 | Antonia Niedermaier (GER) | Canyon//SRAM | + 1' 24" |
| 4 | Isabella Holmgren (CAN) | Lidl–Trek | + 2' 01" |
| 5 | Marlen Reusser (SUI) | Movistar Team | + 2' 03" |
| 6 | Elisa Longo Borghini (ITA) | UAE Team ADQ | + 2' 12" |
| 7 | Niamh Fisher-Black (NZL) | Lidl–Trek | + 2' 33" |
| 8 | Femke de Vries (NED) | Visma–Lease a Bike | + 2' 38" |
| 9 | Monica Trinca Colonel (ITA) | Liv AlUla Jayco | + 3' 21" |
| 10 | Urška Žigart (SLO) | AG Insurance–Soudal | + 3' 26" |

== Stage 6 ==
4 June 2026 — Ala to Brescello, 155 km (96 mi)

The sixth stage of the race took riders south to Brescello in the Emilia-Romagna region on a flat route. Despite crosswinds on the stage, Balsamo won her fourth stage of the race in a sprint finish – further extending their lead in the points classification. Van der Breggen maintained her lead in the GC.

Stage 6 Result
| Rank | Rider | Team | Time |
|---|---|---|---|
| 1 | Elisa Balsamo (ITA) | Lidl–Trek | 3h 54' 02" |
| 2 | Maggie Coles-Lyster (CAN) | Human Powered Health | + 0" |
| 3 | Georgia Baker (AUS) | Liv AlUla Jayco | + 0" |
| 4 | Célia Gery (FRA) | FDJ United–Suez | + 0" |
| 5 | Chiara Consonni (ITA) | Canyon//SRAM | + 0" |
| 6 | Gladys Verhulst-Wild (FRA) | AG Insurance–Soudal | + 0" |
| 7 | Lara Gillespie (IRL) | UAE Team ADQ | + 0" |
| 8 | Lily Williams (USA) | Human Powered Health | + 0" |
| 9 | Alessia Zambelli (ITA) | Top Girls Fassa Bortolo | + 0" |
| 10 | Alexandra Volstad (CAN) | EF Education–Oatly | + 0" |

General classification after Stage 6
| Rank | Rider | Team | Time |
|---|---|---|---|
| 1 | Anna van der Breggen (NED) | Team SD Worx–Protime | 19h 49' 15" |
| 2 | Demi Vollering (NED) | FDJ United–Suez | + 1' 00" |
| 3 | Antonia Niedermaier (GER) | Canyon//SRAM | + 1' 24" |
| 4 | Isabella Holmgren (CAN) | Lidl–Trek | + 2' 01" |
| 5 | Marlen Reusser (SUI) | Movistar Team | + 2' 03" |
| 6 | Elisa Longo Borghini (ITA) | UAE Team ADQ | + 2' 12" |
| 7 | Niamh Fisher-Black (NZL) | Lidl–Trek | + 2' 33" |
| 8 | Femke de Vries (NED) | Visma–Lease a Bike | + 2' 38" |
| 9 | Monica Trinca Colonel (ITA) | Liv AlUla Jayco | + 3' 21" |
| 10 | Urška Žigart (SLO) | AG Insurance–Soudal | + 3' 26" |

== Stage 7 ==
5 June 2026 — Sorbolo Mezzani to Salice Terme, 165 km (103 mi)

The seventh stage was the longest of the race at 165 km (103 mi) in length, taking the riders westwards to Salice Terme in Lombardy, with one climb at Pietragavina located 32 km (20 mi) from the finish. With 56 km (35 mi) to go, a large crash involved van der Breggen and Reusser, however they returned to the peloton and did not lose any time. On the descent from the Pietragavina climb, the breakaway included Longo Borghini, who aimed to gain time from her GCrivals. At the finish, the breakaway held off the chasing peloton with Célia Gery (FDJ United–Suez) beating Lucinda Brand (Lidl–Trek) and Chantal Pegolo (Isolmant–Premac–Vittoria) in a sprint finish. Longo Borghini gained five seconds, but remained over 2 minutes behind van der Breggen.

Stage 7 Result
| Rank | Rider | Team | Time |
|---|---|---|---|
| 1 | Célia Gery (FRA) | FDJ United–Suez | 3h 51' 13" |
| 2 | Lucinda Brand (NED) | Lidl–Trek | + 0" |
| 3 | Chantal Pegolo (ITA) | Isolmant–Premac–Vittoria | + 0" |
| 4 | Alison Jackson (CAN) | St. Michel–Preference Home–Auber93 | + 0" |
| 5 | Elisa Longo Borghini (ITA) | UAE Team ADQ | + 3" |
| 6 | Gaia Segato (ITA) | Vini Fantini–BePink | + 3" |
| 7 | Lara Gillespie (IRL) | UAE Team ADQ | + 8" |
| 8 | Chiara Consonni (ITA) | Canyon//SRAM | + 8" |
| 9 | Millie Couzens (GBR) | Fenix–Premier Tech | + 8" |
| 10 | Josie Nelson (GBR) | Team Picnic–PostNL | + 8" |

General classification after Stage 7
| Rank | Rider | Team | Time |
|---|---|---|---|
| 1 | Anna van der Breggen (NED) | Team SD Worx–Protime | 23h 40' 36" |
| 2 | Demi Vollering (NED) | FDJ United–Suez | + 1' 00" |
| 3 | Antonia Niedermaier (GER) | Canyon//SRAM | + 1' 24" |
| 4 | Isabella Holmgren (CAN) | Lidl–Trek | + 2' 01" |
| 5 | Marlen Reusser (SUI) | Movistar Team | + 2' 03" |
| 6 | Elisa Longo Borghini (ITA) | UAE Team ADQ | + 2' 07" |
| 7 | Niamh Fisher-Black (NZL) | Lidl–Trek | + 2' 33" |
| 8 | Femke de Vries (NED) | Visma–Lease a Bike | + 2' 38" |
| 9 | Monica Trinca Colonel (ITA) | Liv AlUla Jayco | + 3' 21" |
| 10 | Urška Žigart (SLO) | AG Insurance–Soudal | + 3' 26" |

== Stage 8 ==
6 June 2026 — Rivoli to ~~Sestriere~~ Colle delle Finestre, ~~101 km (63 mi)~~ 77.4 km (48.1 mi)

The eighth stage of the race was considered to be the queen stage, originally planned to be 101 km (63 mi) from Rivoli to Sestriere in the Piedmont region. The stage would feature two climbs, the Colle delle Finestre (18.5 km (11.5 mi) in length with an average gradient of 9.2%, with the final 8 km (5.0 mi) of the climb on gravel roads) and the ascent to the finish at Sestriere.

On the climb to Colle delle Finestre, a GC group including Vollering, van der Breggen, Holmgren and Niedermaier slowly reduced the lead of the breakaway until they were at the front of the race. With 7.5 km (4.7 mi) of the climb remaining, organisers announced that the stage would be shortened for safety reasons, finishing around 1 km (0.62 mi) from the summit of the Colle delle Finestre. Organisers noted an "unstable sheet of ice that could fall onto the road" and that the top of the climb had previously been blocked by an avalanche. The stage would therefore be 77.4 km (48.1 mi) in length. As riders were made aware of the shortened route, Vollering attacked several times with only van der Breggen, Holmgren and Niedermaier able to follow with around 5.5 km (3.4 mi) to go. After a flurry of attacks, van der Breggen set the pace at the front approaching the finish – with Vollering attacking in the final to take the stage win ahead of Holmgren and Niedermaier. Van de Breggen maintained her lead in the GC, however bonus seconds meant that her lead over Vollering had been cut to 49 seconds.

Stage 8 Result
| Rank | Rider | Team | Time |
|---|---|---|---|
| 1 | Demi Vollering (NED) | FDJ United–Suez | 2h 27' 47" |
| 2 | Isabella Holmgren (CAN) | Lidl–Trek | + 1" |
| 3 | Antonia Niedermaier (GER) | Canyon//SRAM | + 1" |
| 4 | Anna van der Breggen (NED) | Team SD Worx–Protime | + 1" |
| 5 | Femke de Vries (NED) | Visma–Lease a Bike | + 53" |
| 6 | Marlen Reusser (SUI) | Movistar Team | + 56" |
| 7 | Lauren Dickson (GBR) | FDJ United–Suez | + 1' 09" |
| 8 | Elisa Longo Borghini (ITA) | UAE Team ADQ | + 1' 38" |
| 9 | Niamh Fisher-Black (NZL) | Lidl–Trek | + 1' 46" |
| 10 | Valentina Cavallar (AUT) | Team SD Worx–Protime | + 2' 17" |

General classification after Stage 8
| Rank | Rider | Team | Time |
|---|---|---|---|
| 1 | Anna van der Breggen (NED) | Team SD Worx–Protime | 26h 08' 24" |
| 2 | Demi Vollering (NED) | FDJ United–Suez | + 49" |
| 3 | Antonia Niedermaier (GER) | Canyon//SRAM | + 1' 20" |
| 4 | Isabella Holmgren (CAN) | Lidl–Trek | + 1' 55" |
| 5 | Marlen Reusser (SUI) | Movistar Team | + 2' 58" |
| 6 | Femke de Vries (NED) | Visma–Lease a Bike | + 3' 30" |
| 7 | Elisa Longo Borghini (ITA) | UAE Team ADQ | + 3' 44" |
| 8 | Niamh Fisher-Black (NZL) | Lidl–Trek | + 4' 18" |
| 9 | Urška Žigart (SLO) | AG Insurance–Soudal | + 5' 48" |
| 10 | Valentina Cavallar (AUT) | Team SD Worx–Protime | + 6' 41" |

== Stage 9 ==
7 June 2026 — Saluzzo to Saluzzo, 143 km (89 mi)

The ninth stage of the race started and finished in Saluzzo in the Piedmont region. The 143 km (89 mi) course included three categorised climbs, followed by a "punchy finale" into the finish in Saluzzo.

Niedermaier attacked with around 80 km (50 mi) to go, followed by Longo Borghini and Fisher-Black. Niedermaier gained a substantial lead of over two minutes, thereby taking the virtual lead in the GC. On the Colletta di Brondello climb, Vollering attacked, distancing her rival van der Breggen and joining the group of Niedermaier, Longo Borghini and Fisher-Black with around 30 km (19 mi) remaining. Vollering had a lead over van der Breggen of over a minute, thereby taking the virtual GC lead. As the group of four pushed towards the finish, van der Breggen continued to lose time. Approaching the finish, Vollering knew overall victory had been secured, so let the other three riders fight for the win – with Longo Borghini beating a long sprint by Fisher-Black to take the stage win. Van der Breggen finished the stage 2 minutes 23 seconds behind Vollering, and therefore fell to third overall behind Niedermaier.

Stage 9 Result
| Rank | Rider | Team | Time |
|---|---|---|---|
| 1 | Elisa Longo Borghini (ITA) | UAE Team ADQ | 3h 45' 09" |
| 2 | Niamh Fisher-Black (NZL) | Lidl–Trek | + 0" |
| 3 | Antonia Niedermaier (GER) | Canyon//SRAM | + 2" |
| 4 | Demi Vollering (NED) | FDJ United–Suez | + 3" |
| 5 | Femke de Vries (NED) | Visma–Lease a Bike | + 2' 23" |
| 6 | Anna van der Breggen (NED) | Team SD Worx–Protime | + 2' 23" |
| 7 | Sigrid Ytterhus Haugset (NOR) | Uno-X Mobility | + 5' 59" |
| 8 | Lauren Dickson (GBR) | FDJ United–Suez | + 5' 59" |
| 9 | Isabella Holmgren (CAN) | Lidl–Trek | + 6' 01" |
| 10 | Magdeleine Vallieres (CAN) | EF Education–Oatly | + 6' 01" |

General classification after Stage 9
| Rank | Rider | Team | Time |
|---|---|---|---|
| 1 | Demi Vollering (NED) | FDJ United–Suez | 29h 54' 19" |
| 2 | Antonia Niedermaier (GER) | Canyon//SRAM | + 30" |
| 3 | Anna van der Breggen (NED) | Team SD Worx–Protime | + 1' 37" |
| 4 | Elisa Longo Borghini (ITA) | UAE Team ADQ | + 2' 44" |
| 5 | Niamh Fisher-Black (NZL) | Lidl–Trek | + 3' 26" |
| 6 | Femke de Vries (NED) | Visma–Lease a Bike | + 5' 07" |
| 7 | Isabella Holmgren (CAN) | Lidl–Trek | + 7' 10" |
| 8 | Urška Žigart (SLO) | AG Insurance–Soudal | + 12' 39" |
| 9 | Valentina Cavallar (AUT) | Team SD Worx–Protime | + 13' 12" |
| 10 | Lore De Schepper (BEL) | AG Insurance–Soudal | + 13' 29" |
