= 2026 Itzulia Women =

Cycling race

2026 UCI Women's World Tour, race 17 of 26

Race details
- Dates: 15–17 May 2026
- Stages: 3
- Distance: 390.4 km (242.6 mi)
- Winning time: 10h 15' 56"

Results
Jersey awarded to the overall winner	Winner	Mischa Bredewold (NED)	(Team SD Worx–Protime)
	Second	Yara Kastelijn (NED)	(Fenix–Premier Tech)
	Third	Lauren Dickson (GBR)	(FDJ United–Suez)
Jersey awarded to the points classification winner	Points	Mischa Bredewold (NED)	(Team SD Worx–Protime)
Jersey awarded to the mountains classification winner	Mountains	Yara Kastelijn (NED)	(Fenix–Premier Tech)
Jersey awarded to the young rider classification winner	Young rider	Ema Comte (FRA)	(Cofidis)
	Team	(France) FDJ United–Suez	

The 2026 Itzulia Women was a Spanish women's road cycle stage race that was held in the Basque Country from 15 to 17 May. It was the fifth edition of Itzulia Women, and the 17th event in the 2026 UCI Women's World Tour.

The race was won by Dutch rider Mischa Bredewold of Team SD Worx–Protime. Bredewold also took the points classification. Second overall was Dutch rider Yara Kastelijn of Fenix–Premier Tech, who also took the mountains classification. Third overall was British rider Lauren Dickson of FDJ United–Suez. The youth classification was won by Ema Comte of Cofidis, with the team classification won by FDJ United–Suez.

== Teams ==
Thirteen UCI Women's WorldTeams, four UCI Women's ProTeams, and two UCI Women's Continental Teams took part in the race.

UCI Women's WorldTeams

- AG Insurance–Soudal
- Canyon//SRAM Zondacrypto
- EF Education–Oatly
- FDJ United–Suez
- Fenix–Premier Tech
- Human Powered Health
- Lidl–Trek
- Liv AlUla Jayco
- Movistar Team
- Team SD Worx–Protime
- Team Picnic–PostNL
- UAE Team ADQ
- Uno-X Mobility

UCI Women's ProTeams

- Cofidis
- Laboral Kutxa–Fundación Euskadi
- Ma Petite Entreprise
- St. Michel–Preference Home–Auber93

UCI Women's Continental Teams

- Hitec Products–Fluid Control
- Vini Fantini–BePink

== Route ==
Stage characteristics and winners
Stage	Date	Course	Distance	Type	Stage winner
1	16 May	Zarautz to Zarautz	121.3 km (75.4 mi)	Hilly stage	Mischa Bredewold (NED)
2	17 May	Abadiño to Amorebieta-Etxano	138 km (86 mi)	Hilly stage	Dominika Włodarczyk (POL)
3	18 May	San Sebastián to San Sebastián	131.1 km (81.5 mi)	Hilly stage	Dominika Włodarczyk (POL)
Total			390.4 km (242.6 mi)		

== Stages ==
=== Stage 1 ===
15 May 2026 — Zarautz to Zarautz, 121.3 km (75.4 mi)

Stage 1 Result
Rank	Rider	Team	Time
1	Mischa Bredewold (NED)	Team SD Worx–Protime	3h 30' 35"
2	Yara Kastelijn (NED)	Fenix–Premier Tech	+ 0"
3	Riejanne Markus (NED)	Lidl–Trek	+ 0"
4	Lauren Dickson (GBR)	FDJ United–Suez	+ 0"
5	Antonia Niedermaier (GER)	Canyon//SRAM Zondacrypto	+ 2"
6	Liane Lippert (GER)	Movistar Team	+ 18"
7	Usoa Ostolaza (ESP)	Laboral Kutxa–Fundación Euskadi	+ 18"
8	Dominika Włodarczyk (POL)	UAE Team ADQ	+ 18"
9	Ricarda Bauernfeind (GER)	Lidl–Trek	+ 18"
10	Letizia Borghesi (ITA)	AG Insurance–Soudal	+ 18"

General classification after Stage 1
Rank	Rider	Team	Time
1	Mischa Bredewold (NED)	Team SD Worx–Protime	3h 30' 22"
2	Yara Kastelijn (NED)	Fenix–Premier Tech	+ 7"
3	Riejanne Markus (NED)	Lidl–Trek	+ 8"
4	Lauren Dickson (GBR)	FDJ United–Suez	+ 11"
5	Antonia Niedermaier (GER)	Canyon//SRAM Zondacrypto	+ 15"
6	Évita Muzic (FRA)	FDJ United–Suez	+ 28"
7	Juliette Berthet (FRA)	FDJ United–Suez	+ 29"
8	Liane Lippert (GER)	Movistar Team	+ 31"
9	Usoa Ostolaza (ESP)	Laboral Kutxa–Fundación Euskadi	+ 31"
10	Dominika Włodarczyk (POL)	UAE Team ADQ	+ 31"

=== Stage 2 ===
16 May 2026 — Abadiño to Amorebieta-Etxano, 138 km (86 mi)

Stage 2 Result
Rank	Rider	Team	Time
1	Dominika Włodarczyk (POL)	UAE Team ADQ	3h 46' 47"
2	Mischa Bredewold (NED)	Team SD Worx–Protime	+ 0"
3	Shirin van Anrooij (NED)	Lidl–Trek	+ 0"
4	Liane Lippert (GER)	Movistar Team	+ 0"
5	Letizia Borghesi (ITA)	AG Insurance–Soudal	+ 0"
6	Usoa Ostolaza (ESP)	Laboral Kutxa–Fundación Euskadi	+ 0"
7	Caroline Andersson (SWE)	Liv AlUla Jayco	+ 0"
8	Yara Kastelijn (NED)	Fenix–Premier Tech	+ 0"
9	Émilie Morier (FRA)	St. Michel–Preference Home–Auber93	+ 0"
10	Riejanne Markus (NED)	Lidl–Trek	+ 0"

General classification after Stage 2
Rank	Rider	Team	Time
1	Mischa Bredewold (NED)	Team SD Worx–Protime	7h 17' 00"
2	Yara Kastelijn (NED)	Fenix–Premier Tech	+ 16"
3	Riejanne Markus (NED)	Lidl–Trek	+ 17"
4	Lauren Dickson (GBR)	FDJ United–Suez	+ 20"
5	Antonia Niedermaier (GER)	Canyon//SRAM Zondacrypto	+ 24"
6	Dominika Włodarczyk (POL)	UAE Team ADQ	+ 30"
7	Liane Lippert (GER)	Movistar Team	+ 36"
8	Évita Muzic (FRA)	FDJ United–Suez	+ 37"
9	Juliette Berthet (FRA)	FDJ United–Suez	+ 38"
10	Usoa Ostolaza (ESP)	Laboral Kutxa–Fundación Euskadi	+ 39"

=== Stage 3 ===
17 May 2026 — San Sebastián to San Sebastián, 131.1 km (81.5 mi)

Stage 3 Result
Rank	Rider	Team	Time
1	Dominika Włodarczyk (POL)	UAE Team ADQ	2h 59' 01"
2	Évita Muzic (FRA)	FDJ United–Suez	+ 0"
3	Lauren Dickson (GBR)	FDJ United–Suez	+ 0"
4	Usoa Ostolaza (ESP)	Laboral Kutxa–Fundación Euskadi	+ 0"
5	Yara Kastelijn (NED)	Fenix–Premier Tech	+ 0"
6	Mischa Bredewold (NED)	Team SD Worx–Protime	+ 0"
7	Juliette Berthet (FRA)	FDJ United–Suez	+ 0"
8	Antonia Niedermaier (GER)	Canyon//SRAM Zondacrypto	+ 0"
9	Riejanne Markus (NED)	Lidl–Trek	+ 0"
10	Ricarda Bauernfeind (GER)	Lidl–Trek	+ 0"

General classification after Stage 3
Rank	Rider	Team	Time
1	Mischa Bredewold (NED)	Team SD Worx–Protime	10h 15' 56"
2	Yara Kastelijn (NED)	Fenix–Premier Tech	+ 21"
3	Lauren Dickson (GBR)	FDJ United–Suez	+ 21"
4	Riejanne Markus (NED)	Lidl–Trek	+ 22"
5	Antonia Niedermaier (GER)	Canyon//SRAM Zondacrypto	+ 29"
6	Évita Muzic (FRA)	FDJ United–Suez	+ 36"
7	Usoa Ostolaza (ESP)	Laboral Kutxa–Fundación Euskadi	+ 43"
8	Juliette Berthet (FRA)	FDJ United–Suez	+ 43"
9	Dominika Włodarczyk (POL)	UAE Team ADQ	+ 44"
10	Ricarda Bauernfeind (GER)	Lidl–Trek	+ 45"

== Classification leadership table ==
Classification leadership by stage
Stage	Winner	General classification	Points classification	Mountains classification	Young rider classification	Team classification
1	Mischa Bredewold	Mischa Bredewold	Mischa Bredewold	Yara Kastelijn	Ema Comte	FDJ United–Suez
2	Dominika Włodarczyk	Mischa Bredewold	Mischa Bredewold	Yara Kastelijn	Ema Comte	FDJ United–Suez
3	Dominika Włodarczyk	Mischa Bredewold	Mischa Bredewold	Yara Kastelijn	Ema Comte	FDJ United–Suez
Final		Mischa Bredewold	Mischa Bredewold	Yara Kastelijn	Ema Comte	FDJ United–Suez

== Classification standings ==
Legend
Denotes the winner of the general classification	Denotes the winner of the mountains classification
Denotes the winner of the points classification	Denotes the winner of the young rider classification

=== General classification ===
Final general classification (1–10)
Rank	Rider	Team	Time
1	Mischa Bredewold (NED)	Team SD Worx–Protime	10h 15' 56"
2	Yara Kastelijn (NED)	Fenix–Premier Tech	+ 21"
3	Lauren Dickson (GBR)	FDJ United–Suez	+ 21"
4	Riejanne Markus (NED)	Lidl–Trek	+ 22"
5	Antonia Niedermaier (GER)	Canyon//SRAM Zondacrypto	+ 29"
6	Évita Muzic (FRA)	FDJ United–Suez	+ 36"
7	Usoa Ostolaza (ESP)	Laboral Kutxa–Fundación Euskadi	+ 43"
8	Juliette Berthet (FRA)	FDJ United–Suez	+ 43"
9	Dominika Włodarczyk (POL)	UAE Team ADQ	+ 44"
10	Ricarda Bauernfeind (GER)	Lidl–Trek	+ 45"

=== Points classification ===
Final points classification (1–10)
Rank	Rider	Team	Points
1	Mischa Bredewold (NED)	Team SD Worx–Protime	91
2	Dominika Włodarczyk (POL)	UAE Team ADQ	57
3	Liane Lippert (GER)	Movistar Team	56
4	Usoa Ostolaza (ESP)	Laboral Kutxa–Fundación Euskadi	41
5	Yara Kastelijn (NED)	Fenix–Premier Tech	40
6	Évita Muzic (FRA)	FDJ United–Suez	39
7	Lauren Dickson (GBR)	FDJ United–Suez	36
8	Riejanne Markus (NED)	Lidl–Trek	33
9	Letizia Borghesi (ITA)	AG Insurance–Soudal	27
10	Antonia Niedermaier (GER)	Canyon//SRAM Zondacrypto	20

=== Mountains classification ===
Final mountains classification (1–10)
Rank	Rider	Team	Points
1	Yara Kastelijn (NED)	Fenix–Premier Tech	33
2	Antonia Niedermaier (GER)	Canyon//SRAM Zondacrypto	20
3	Lauren Dickson (GBR)	FDJ United–Suez	8
4	Steffi Häberlin (SUI)	Team SD Worx–Protime	8
5	Nikola Nosková (CZE)	Cofidis	6
6	Soraya Paladin (ITA)	Canyon//SRAM Zondacrypto	6
7	Nina Berton (LUX)	EF Education–Oatly	5
8	Léa Curinier (FRA)	FDJ United–Suez	4
9	Megan Arens (NED)	Team Picnic–PostNL	4
10	Loes Adegeest (NED)	Lidl–Trek	4

=== Young rider classification ===
Final young rider classification (1–10)
Rank	Rider	Team	Time
1	Ema Comte (FRA)	Cofidis	10h 18' 42"
2	Talia Appleton (AUS)	Liv AlUla Jayco	+ 6' 38"
3	Megan Arens (NED)	Team Picnic–PostNL	+ 8' 47"
4	Paula Ostiz (ESP)	Movistar Team	+ 10' 17"
5	Justyna Czapla (GER)	Canyon//SRAM Zondacrypto	+ 12' 58"
6	Mirre Knaven (NED)	EF Education–Oatly	+ 19' 57"
7	Stina Kagevi (SWE)	EF Education–Oatly	+ 20' 06"
8	Wilma Aintila (FIN)	Canyon//SRAM Zondacrypto	+ 28' 12"
9	Eglantine Rayer (FRA)	FDJ United–Suez	+ 29' 02"
10	Mara Roldan (CAN)	Team Picnic–PostNL	+ 31' 01"

=== Team classification ===
Final team classification (1–10)
Rank	Team	Time
1	(France) FDJ United–Suez	30h 49' 45"
2	(Germany) Lidl–Trek	+ 9' 20"
3	(Netherlands) Team SD Worx–Protime	+ 9' 35"
4	(Spain) Laboral Kutxa–Fundación Euskadi	+ 14' 37"
5	(United States) Human Powered Health	+ 18' 14"
6	(Belgium) Fenix–Premier Tech	+ 18' 17"
7	(Belgium) AG Insurance–Soudal	+ 28' 08"
8	(Australia) Liv AlUla Jayco	+ 29' 06"
9	(Spain) Movistar Team	+ 34' 05"
10	(United States) EF Education–Oatly	+ 40' 40"
