= 2026 Giro d'Italia Women =

Italian cycling race

2026 UCI Women's World Tour, race 19 of 26

Race details
- Dates: 30 May – 7 June 2026
- Stages: 9
- Distance: 1,130.1 km (702.2 mi)
- Winning time: 29h 54' 19"

Results
Jersey awarded to the overall winner	Winner	Demi Vollering (NED)	(FDJ United–Suez)
	Second	Antonia Niedermaier (GER)	(Canyon//SRAM)
	Third	Anna van der Breggen (NED)	(Team SD Worx–Protime)
Jersey awarded to the points classification winner	Points	Elisa Balsamo (ITA)	(Lidl–Trek)
Jersey awarded to the mountains classification winner	Mountains	Demi Vollering (NED)	(FDJ United–Suez)
Jersey awarded to the young rider classification winner	Young rider	Isabella Holmgren (CAN)	(Lidl–Trek)
	Team	(Germany) Lidl–Trek	

The 2026 Giro d'Italia Women was the 37th edition of the Giro d'Italia Women, a women's road cycling stage race in Italy, and the 19th event of the 2026 UCI Women's World Tour calendar. The race started on 30 May and finished on 7 June. The race was organised by RCS Sport, which also organises the men's Giro d'Italia.

The race moved to June from its traditional July date – and started on the same weekend as the finish of the men's race. The race previously had to compete for attention with the more famous men's Tour de France, and organisers had previously stated that they wished to move the calendar position of the race, so that the race is not overshadowed. Compared to other races in the UCI Women's World Tour, more ranking points are now awarded at the Giro d'Italia Women, Tour de France Femmes and the Vuelta Femenina – elevating these races in status.

The race was won by Dutch rider Demi Vollering (FDJ United–Suez) for the first time, after a strong performance on the final stage overcame a deficit of just under a minute. Vollering won two stages on her way to victory, becoming only the second woman after Annemiek van Vleuten to win all three Grand Tours. Second overall was German rider Antonia Niedermaier (Canyon//SRAM), who performed strongly throughout the race, finishing in the top 5 on four stages. Third overall was Dutch rider Anna van der Breggen (Team SD Worx–Protime), who led the race for four stages, after winning the mountainous individual time trial on stage 4.

In the race's other classifications, the mountains classification was won by Vollering, and the points classification was won by Italian rider Elisa Balsamo (Lidl–Trek), who won 4 stages. Her main rival Lorena Wiebes was disqualified from the race on stage 1 due to an underweight bike. The young rider classification was won by Canadian rider Isabella Holmgren (Lidl–Trek), who finished 7th overall after finishing in the top 10 on four stages. Lidl–Trek won the teams classification.

== Teams ==
Twenty-one teams participated in the race. All fourteen UCI Women's WorldTeams were automatically invited. They were joined by two UCI Women's ProTeams and five UCI Women's Continental Teams.

UCI Women's WorldTeams

- AG Insurance–Soudal
- Canyon//SRAM
- EF Education–Oatly
- FDJ United–Suez
- Fenix–Premier Tech
- Human Powered Health
- Lidl–Trek
- Liv AlUla Jayco
- Movistar Team
- Team Picnic–PostNL
- Team SD Worx–Protime
- UAE Team ADQ
- Uno-X Mobility
- Visma–Lease a Bike

UCI Women's Pro Teams

- Laboral Kutxa–Fundación Euskadi
- St. Michel–Preference Home–Auber93

UCI Women's Continental Teams

- Aromitalia Vaiano
- Isolmant–Premac–Vittoria
- Team Mendelspeck E-Work
- Top Girls Fassa Bortolo
- Vini Fantini–BePink

== Route and stages ==
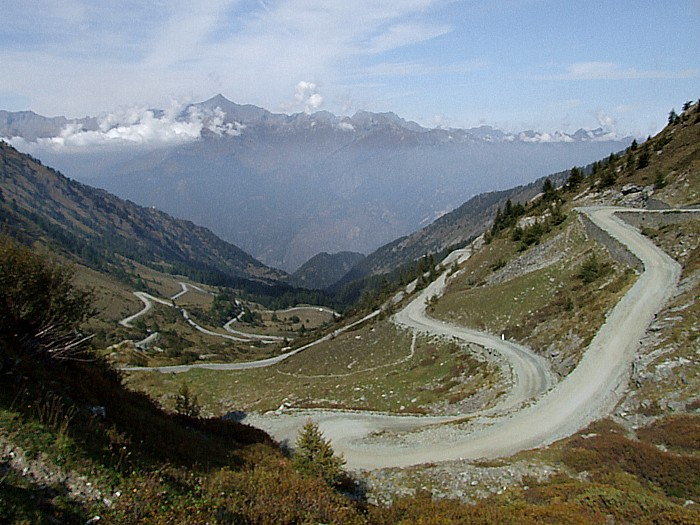
Stage 8 finished at the top of Colle delle Finestre, after an avalanche shortened the stage

In December 2025, the route was announced by organisers RCS Sport. It comprised nine days of racing with nine stages, covering a total of 1,153.7 kilometres (716.9 mi) with 12,500 metres (41,000 ft) of elevation gain. The race started in Cesenatico, Emilia-Romagna in northern Italy, before heading north through the Veneto and Friuli-Venezia Giulia regions, before heading west through the Trentino, Lombardy and Piedmont regions. The race finished in Saluzzo, Piedmont.

The race had two summit finishes, with an uphill time trial between Belluno and Nevegal in the Veneto region on stage 4, and a summit finish in Sestriere following the classic climb of Colle delle Finestre on stage 8. The Colle delle Finestre climb is 18.5 km (11.5 mi) in length with an average gradient of 9.2%, with the final 8 km (5.0 mi) of the climb on gravel roads. As the highest climb of the race, the first rider to pass Colle delle Finestre (2,178 metres (7,146 ft)) was awarded the "Cima Alfonsina Strada" – a prize named after Italian cyclist Alfonsina Strada, who took part in the men's Giro d'Italia in 1924.

The race returned to 9 stages in length, and was the longest edition of the Giro d'Italia Women since the 2001 edition of the race. As with previous editions, the route required a waiver from the Union Cycliste Internationale, as Women's WorldTour races have a maximum race length of six days.

Reacting to the route, Rouleur stated that the "iconic climb" of Colle delle Finestre "makes clear just how demanding this route is" and that "pink jersey may not be decided until the very last minute" owing to the "mountainous back-loaded route". Cycling News called the route "really tough", summarising that a "lowkey start builds to a big crescendo with the Colle delle Finestre, a tough stage in the Dolomites, and a challenging uphill [time trial]". 2024 and 2025 winner Elisa Longo Borghini stated that she "really [likes] the route" and that "we needed an iconic climb like the Colle delle Finestre", and it "will decide the 2026 Giro Women".

Stage characteristics
Stage	Date	Course	Distance	Type	Winner
1	30 May	Cesenatico to Ravenna	139 km (86 mi)	Flat stage	Elisa Balsamo (ITA)
2	31 May	Roncade H-Farm to Caorle	146 km (91 mi)	Flat stage	Elisa Balsamo (ITA)
3	1 June	Bibione to Buja	154 km (96 mi)	Hilly stage	Elisa Balsamo (ITA)
4	2 June	Belluno to Nevegal	12.7 km (7.9 mi)	Individual time trial	Anna van der Breggen (NED)
5	3 June	Longarone to Santo Stefano di Cadore	138 km (86 mi)	Mountain stage	Demi Vollering (NED)
6	4 June	Ala to Brescello	155 km (96 mi)	Flat stage	Elisa Balsamo (ITA)
7	5 June	Sorbolo Mezzani to Salice Terme	165 km (103 mi)	Hilly stage	Célia Gery (FRA)
8	6 June	Rivoli to ~~Sestriere~~ Colle delle Finestre	~~101 km (63 mi)~~ 77.4 km (48.1 mi)	Mountain stage	Demi Vollering (NED)
9	7 June	Saluzzo to Saluzzo	143 km (89 mi)	Mountain stage	Elisa Longo Borghini (ITA)
Total			1,130.1 km (702.2 mi)		

== Race overview ==
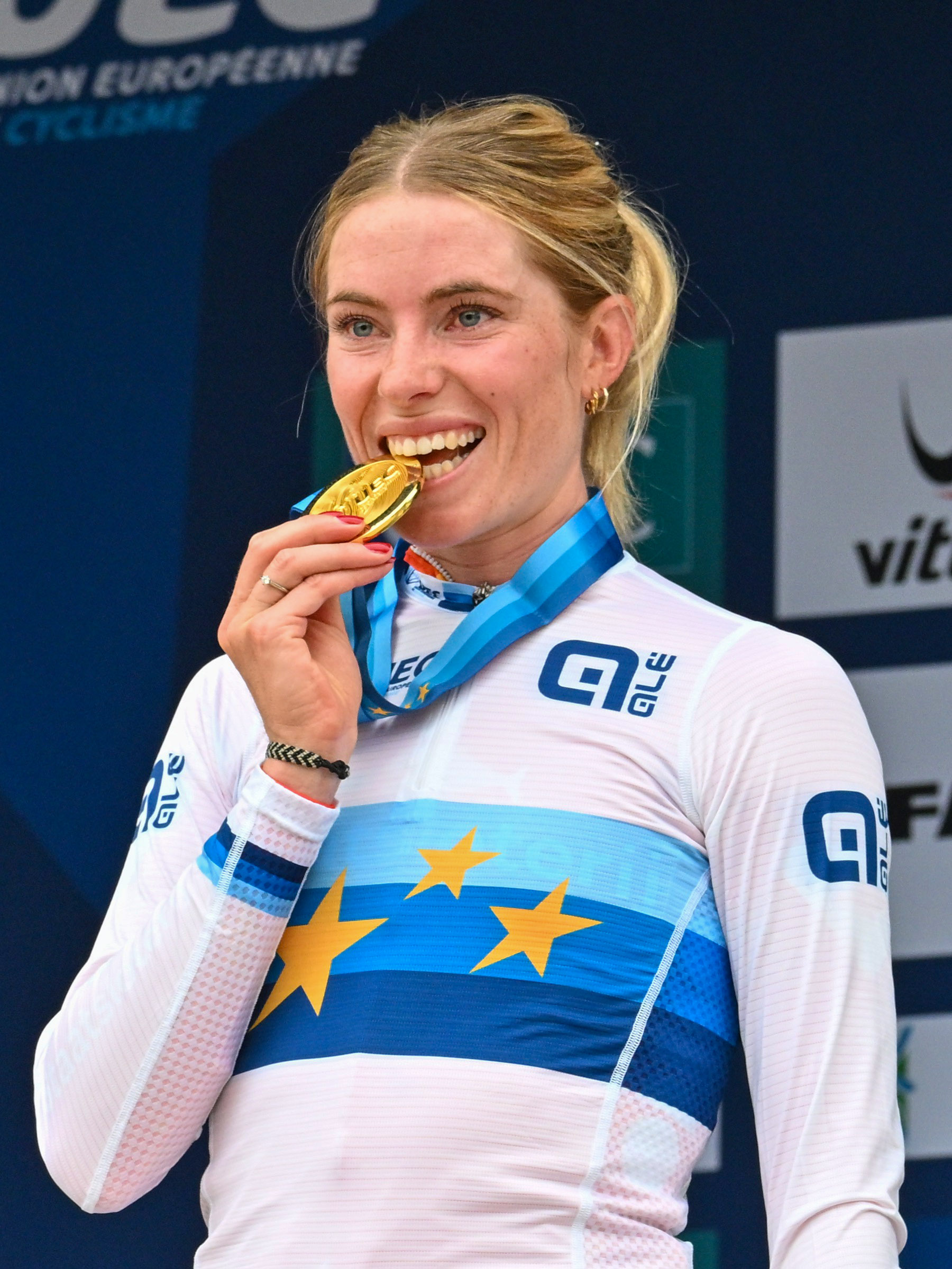
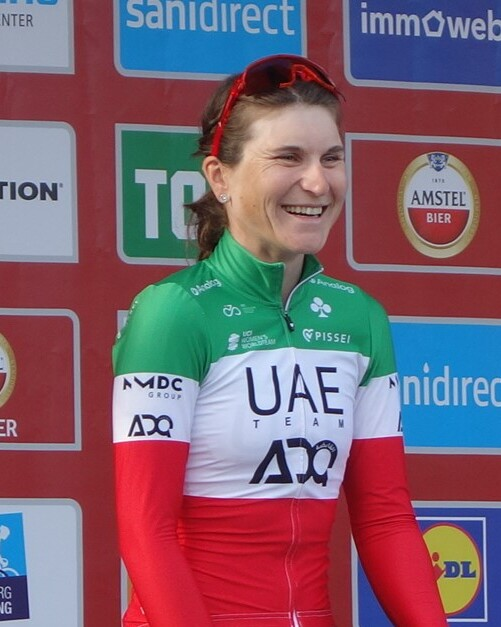
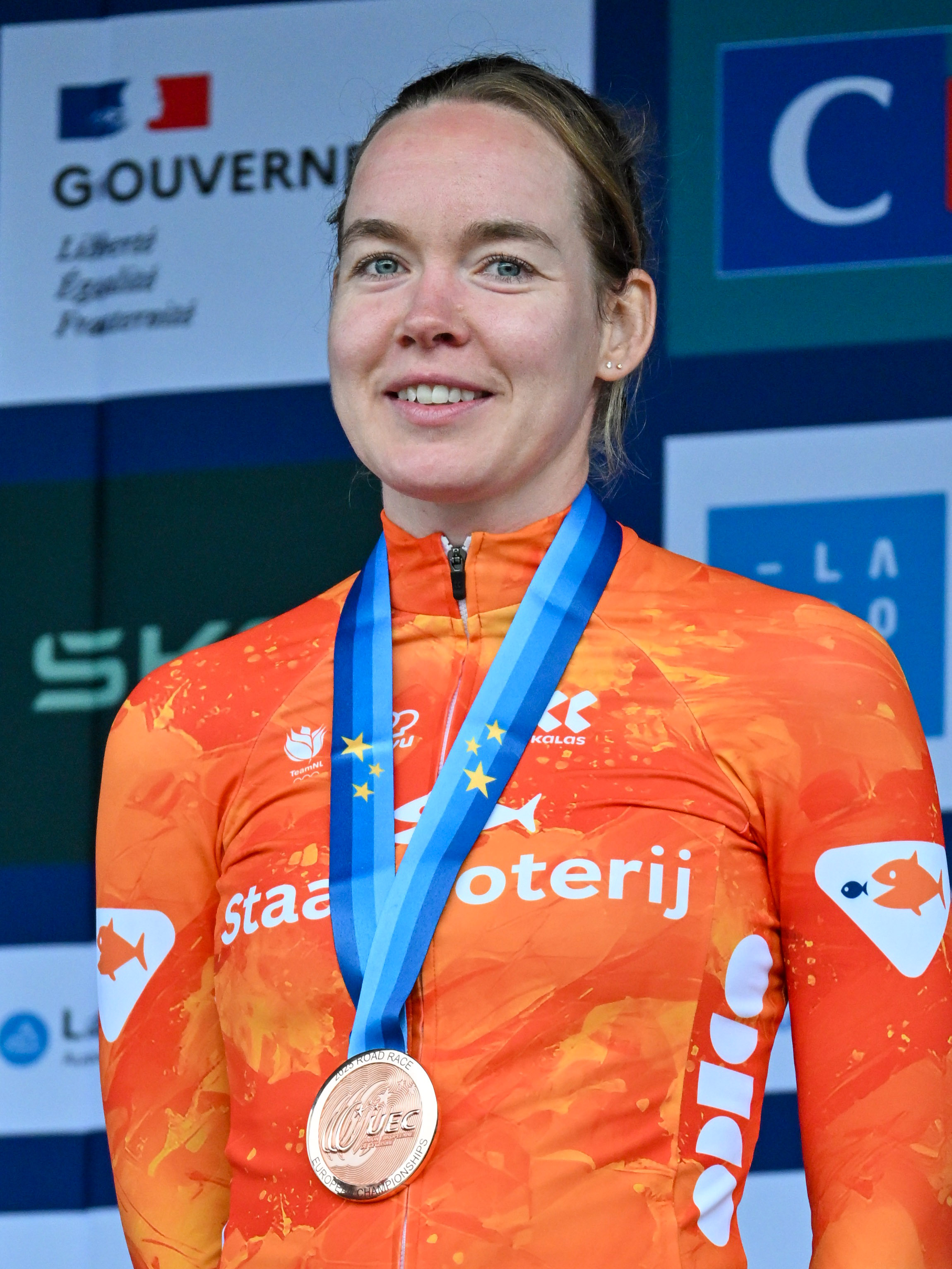
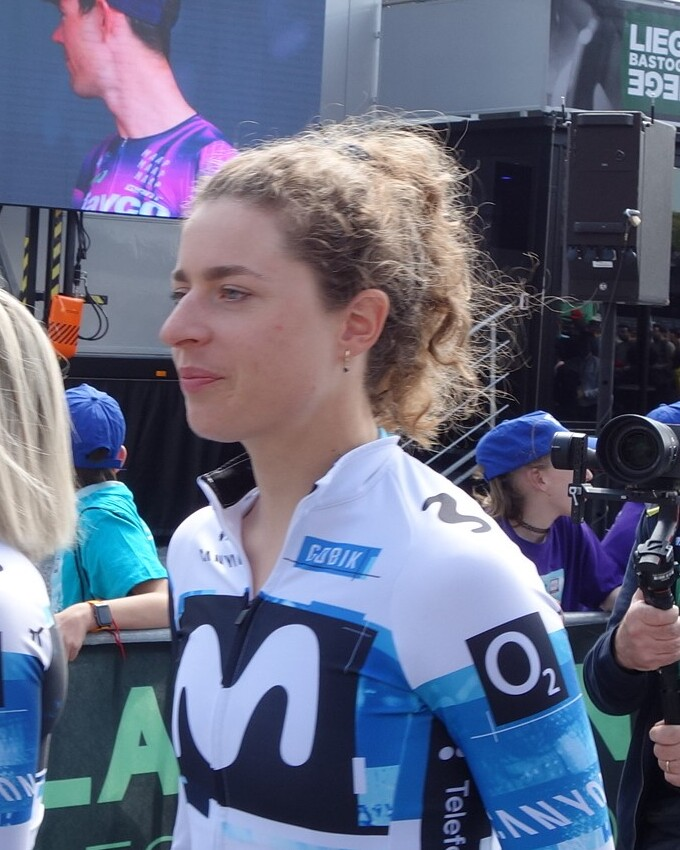
(left to right) Demi Vollering, Elisa Longo Borghini, Anna van der Breggen and Marlen Reusser were considered contenders for the general classification (GC)

Prior to the start of the race, Demi Vollering (FDJ United–Suez) was considered favourite for the overall victory. Other contenders for the general classification (GC) included 2024 and 2025 Giro d'Italia Women winner Elisa Longo Borghini (UAE Team ADQ), four-time Giro d'Italia Women winner Anna van der Breggen (Team SD Worx–Protime) and world time trial champion Marlen Reusser (Movistar Team). Cycling News considered that the race would have "one of its biggest GC battles in recent history", owing to the greater gap between the Giro d'Italia Women and the Tour de France Femmes.

=== Initial stages and mountain time trial ===
The first stage was to Ravenna in the Emilia-Romagna region, with Lorena Wiebes (Team SD Worx–Protime) winning the stage in a sprint finish ahead of Elisa Balsamo (Lidl–Trek). Wiebes was later disqualified from the race as her bike was 20 grams (0.044 lb) under the weight limit of 6.8 kilograms (15 lb). Balsamo was awarded the stage win instead, and therefore led the GC. Team SD Worx–Protime called Wiebes disqualification "an exceptionally severe sanction" as there was no advantage to an underweight bike on a sprint stage and that Wiebes' bike was identical to that used throughout the season. Team SD Worx–Protime subsequently considered legal action against the Union Cycliste Internationale, cycling's governing body.

The race moved to the Veneto region, with the second stage finishing in Caorle. Balsamo won the stage in a sprint finish, retaining her lead in the GC, with a 20 second lead over most of the peloton thanks to bonus seconds.

The third stage was a hilly course, finishing in Buja in the Friuli-Venezia Giulia region. On the climbs, GC contenders split the peloton, with a smaller group heading to the finish. In the uphill sprint to the finish line, Balsamo won her third stage ahead of Lily Williams (Human Powered Health) and Femke Gerritse (Team SD Worx–Protime). Balsamo maintained her lead in the GC, now around 30 seconds over most of the peloton.

The fourth stage of the race was a 12.7 km-long (7.9 mi) individual time trial from Belluno to Nevegal in the Veneto region. The uphill course included a 7.4 km (4.6 mi) climb with an average gradient of 8.2% and a maximum gradient of 14%. The fastest time of 31 minutes 38 minutes was set by Anna van der Breggen, with Marlen Reusser in second place, 1 minute 4 seconds behind. Demi Vollering finished third, six seconds slower. Van der Breggen therefore took the lead in the GC, with Balsamo falling to 56th overall. Van der Breggen last wore the maglia rosa of the leaders jersey on her way to victory at the 2021 edition of the race.

The fifth stage remained in the Veneto region, with a 138 km (86 mi) mountain stage in the Dolomites with 4 categorised climbs including the 1st category Passo Tre Croci. On the last climb of the day, Vollering, van der Breggen, Antonia Niedermaier (Canyon//SRAM) and Isabella Holmgren (Lidl–Trek) formed a group of four riders. By the top of the climb, they had an advantage of 40 seconds over Longo Borghini and Niamh Fisher-Black (Lidl–Trek), with Reusser 15 seconds further behind. Descending to the finish, the gap tightened however the group of four stayed away. Vollering took her first Giro d'Italia Women stage win by outsprinting van der Breggen and Niedermaier. Van der Breggen maintained her lead in the GC, with Vollering gaining 10 seconds to move to second overall. Reusser finished 53 seconds behind Vollering, falling to fifth overall – thereby elevating Niedermaier moved to third overall.

The sixth stage of the race took riders south to Brescello in the Emilia-Romagna region on a flat route. Despite crosswinds on the stage, Balsamo won her fourth stage of the race in a sprint finish – further extending their lead in the points classification. Van der Breggen maintained her lead in the GC.

=== Stages in the mountains ===
The seventh stage was the longest of the race at 165 km (103 mi) in length, taking the riders westwards to Salice Terme in Lombardy, with one climb at Pietragavina located 32 km (20 mi) from the finish. With 56 km (35 mi) to go, a large crash involved van der Breggen and Reusser, however they returned to the peloton and did not lose any time. On the descent from the Pietragavina climb, the breakaway included Longo Borghini, who aimed to gain time from her GC rivals. At the finish, the breakaway held off the chasing peloton with Célia Gery (FDJ United–Suez) beating Lucinda Brand (Lidl–Trek) and Chantal Pegolo (Isolmant–Premac–Vittoria) in a sprint finish. Longo Borghini gained five seconds, but remained over 2 minutes behind van der Breggen.

The eighth stage was considered to be the queen stage of the race, originally planned to be 101 km (63 mi) from Rivoli to Sestriere in the Piedmont region. The stage would feature two climbs, the Colle delle Finestre (18.5 km (11.5 mi) in length with an average gradient of 9.2%, with the final 8 km (5.0 mi) of the climb on gravel roads) and the ascent to the finish at Sestriere.

On the climb to Colle delle Finestre, a GC group including Vollering, van der Breggen, Holmgren and Niedermaier slowly reduced the lead of the breakaway until they were at the front of the race. With 7.5 km (4.7 mi) of the climb remaining, organisers announced that the stage would be shortened for safety reasons, finishing around 1 km (0.62 mi) from the summit of the Colle delle Finestre. Organisers noted an "unstable sheet of ice that could fall onto the road" and that the top of the climb had previously been blocked by an avalanche. The stage would therefore be 77.4 km (48.1 mi) in length. As riders were made aware of the shortened route, Vollering attacked several times with only van der Breggen, Holmgren and Niedermaier able to follow with around 5.5 km (3.4 mi) to go. After a flurry of attacks, van der Breggen set the pace at the front approaching the finish – with Vollering attacking in the final to take the stage win ahead of Holmgren and Niedermaier. Van de Breggen maintained her lead in the GC, however bonus seconds meant that her lead over Vollering had been cut to 49 seconds.

The ninth stage of the race started and finished in Saluzzo in the Piedmont region. The 143 km (89 mi) course included three categorised climbs, followed by a "punchy finale" into the finish in Saluzzo.

Niedermaier attacked with around 80 km (50 mi) to go, followed by Longo Borghini and Fisher-Black. Niedermaier gained a substantial lead of over two minutes, thereby taking the virtual lead in the GC. On the Colletta di Brondello climb, Vollering attacked, distancing her rival van der Breggen and joining the group of Niedermaier, Longo Borghini and Fisher-Black with around 30 km (19 mi) remaining. Vollering had a lead over van der Breggen of over a minute, thereby taking the virtual GC lead. As the group of four pushed towards the finish, van der Breggen continued to lose time. Approaching the finish, Vollering knew overall victory had been secured, so let the other three riders fight for the win – with Longo Borghini beating a long sprint by Fisher-Black to take the stage win and secure 4th place overall. Van der Breggen finished the stage 2 minutes 23 seconds behind Vollering, and therefore fell to third overall behind Niedermaier.

=== Results ===
In the final general classification (GC), Demi Vollering (FDJ United–Suez) won the Giro d'Italia Women for the first time, with an advantage over Antonia Niedermaier (Canyon//SRAM) of 30 seconds. With her win, Vollering became the second woman after Annemiek van Vleuten to win all three Grand Tours. Third overall was Anna van der Breggen (Team SD Worx–Protime), who was 1 minutes 37 seconds behind Vollering.

In the race's other classifications, the mountains classification was won by Vollering ahead of Niedermaier and van der Breggen. The points classification was led from start to finish by Elisa Balsamo (Lidl–Trek), finishing with over twice as many points as her closest rival. The young rider classification was won by Isabella Holmgren (Lidl–Trek), who finished 7th overall after finishing in the top 10 on four stages. Lidl–Trek won the teams classification.

Reacting to her victory, Vollering stated that she had to "dare to lose it all" on the final stage, knowing she had missed an opportunity to take time on the shortened stage 8. Van der Breegen stated that she "sad to lose it, [but] I fought with what I could". Niedermaier expressed her delight in gaining second overall, calling it "a great Giro". Lidl–Trek celebrated their success of winning the team classification, alongside Holmgren winning the young rider classification, Balsamo winning the points classification and Fisher-Black finishing 5th overall.

== Classification leadership table ==
Classification leadership by stage
Stage	Winner	General classification	Points classification	Mountains classification	Young rider classification	Team classification
1	Elisa Balsamo	Elisa Balsamo	Elisa Balsamo (Note: On stages 2–4, Lara Gillespie, who was second in the points classification, wore the red jersey, because first placed Elisa Balsamo wore the pink jersey as the leader of the general classification.)	not awarded	Célia Gery	UAE Team ADQ
2	Elisa Balsamo	Elisa Balsamo	Elisa Balsamo	Eleonora La Bella	Alessia Zambelli	UAE Team ADQ
3	Elisa Balsamo	Elisa Balsamo	Elisa Balsamo	Anna van der Breggen (Note: On stage 5, Marlen Reusser, who was second in the mountains classification, wore the azul jersey, because first placed Anna van der Breggen wore the pink jersey as the leader of the general classification. On stages 6–8, Valentina Cavallar wore the azul jersey for the same reason.)	Célia Gery	UAE Team ADQ
4	Anna van der Breggen	Anna van der Breggen	Elisa Balsamo	Anna van der Breggen	Isabella Holmgren	FDJ United–Suez
5	Demi Vollering	Anna van der Breggen	Elisa Balsamo	Anna van der Breggen	Isabella Holmgren	AG Insurance–Soudal
6	Elisa Balsamo	Anna van der Breggen	Elisa Balsamo	Anna van der Breggen	Isabella Holmgren	AG Insurance–Soudal
7	Célia Gery	Anna van der Breggen	Elisa Balsamo	Anna van der Breggen	Isabella Holmgren	AG Insurance–Soudal
8	Demi Vollering	Anna van der Breggen	Elisa Balsamo	Demi Vollering	Isabella Holmgren	AG Insurance–Soudal
9	Elisa Longo Borghini	Demi Vollering	Elisa Balsamo	Demi Vollering	Isabella Holmgren	Lidl–Trek
Final		Demi Vollering	Elisa Balsamo	Demi Vollering	Isabella Holmgren	Lidl–Trek

== Classification standings ==
Legend
Denotes the winner of the general classification	Denotes the winner of the mountains classification
Denotes the winner of the points classification	Denotes the winner of the young rider classification

=== General classification ===
Final general classification (1–10)
Rank	Rider	Team	Time
1	Demi Vollering (NED)	FDJ United–Suez	29h 54' 19"
2	Antonia Niedermaier (GER)	Canyon//SRAM	+ 30"
3	Anna van der Breggen (NED)	Team SD Worx–Protime	+ 1' 37"
4	Elisa Longo Borghini (ITA)	UAE Team ADQ	+ 2' 44"
5	Niamh Fisher-Black (NZL)	Lidl–Trek	+ 3' 26"
6	Femke de Vries (NED)	Visma–Lease a Bike	+ 5' 07"
7	Isabella Holmgren (CAN)	Lidl–Trek	+ 7' 10"
8	Urška Žigart (SLO)	AG Insurance–Soudal	+ 12' 39"
9	Valentina Cavallar (AUT)	Team SD Worx–Protime	+ 13' 12"
10	Lore De Schepper (BEL)	AG Insurance–Soudal	+ 13' 29"

=== Points classification ===
Final points classification (1–10)
Rank	Rider	Team	Points
1	Elisa Balsamo (ITA)	Lidl–Trek	152
2	Demi Vollering (NED)	FDJ United–Suez	73
3	Célia Gery (FRA)	FDJ United–Suez	63
4	Lara Gillespie (IRL)	UAE Team ADQ	60
5	Elisa Longo Borghini (ITA)	UAE Team ADQ	55
6	Chiara Consonni (ITA)	Canyon//SRAM	49
7	Antonia Niedermaier (GER)	Canyon//SRAM	48
8	Anna van der Breggen (NED)	Team SD Worx–Protime	42
9	Lucinda Brand (NED)	Lidl–Trek	31
10	Lily Williams (USA)	Human Powered Health	30

=== Mountains classification ===
Final mountains classification (1–10)
Rank	Rider	Team	Points
1	Demi Vollering (NED)	FDJ United–Suez	67
2	Antonia Niedermaier (GER)	Canyon//SRAM	55
3	Anna van der Breggen (NED)	Team SD Worx–Protime	53
4	Isabella Holmgren (CAN)	Lidl–Trek	28
5	Valentina Cavallar (AUT)	Team SD Worx–Protime	24
6	Lauren Dickson (GBR)	FDJ United–Suez	21
7	Caroline Andersson (SWE)	Liv AlUla Jayco	21
8	Marlen Reusser (SUI)	Movistar Team	18
9	Femke de Vries (NED)	Visma–Lease a Bike	11
10	Niamh Fisher-Black (NZL)	Lidl–Trek	10

=== Young rider classification ===
Final young rider classification (1–10)
Rank	Rider	Team	Time
1	Isabella Holmgren (CAN)	Lidl–Trek	30h 01' 29"
2	Lore De Schepper (BEL)	AG Insurance–Soudal	+ 6' 19"
3	Viktória Chladoňová (SVK)	Visma–Lease a Bike	+ 27' 24"
4	Rosita Reijnhout (NED)	Visma–Lease a Bike	+ 29' 01"
5	Marion Bunel (FRA)	Visma–Lease a Bike	+ 29' 13"
6	Célia Gery (FRA)	FDJ United–Suez	+ 34' 38"
7	Gaia Segato (ITA)	Vini Fantini–BePink	+ 42' 41"
8	Justyna Czapla (GER)	Canyon//SRAM	+ 1h 13' 18"
9	Stina Kagevi (SWE)	EF Education–Oatly	+ 1h 13' 54"
10	Mirre Knaven (NED)	EF Education–Oatly	+ 1h 21' 27"

=== Team classification ===
Final team classification (1–10)
Rank	Team	Time
1	(Germany) Lidl–Trek	90h 29' 10"
2	(Belgium) AG Insurance–Soudal	+ 3' 23"
3	(France) FDJ United–Suez	+ 10' 02"
4	(Netherlands) Visma–Lease a Bike	+ 22' 38"
5	(United Arab Emirates) UAE Team ADQ	+ 24' 03"
6	(Netherlands) Team SD Worx–Protime	+ 40' 41"
7	(Australia) Liv AlUla Jayco	+ 53' 41"
8	(Germany) Canyon//SRAM	+ 56' 24"
9	(Norway) Uno-X Mobility	+ 59' 16"
10	(United States) Human Powered Health	+ 1h 02' 03"
