= St. Michel–Auber93 =

St. Michel–Auber93 may refer to:

- St. Michel–Auber93 (men's team), a professional cycling team that competes on the UCI World Tour
- St. Michel–Auber93 (women's team), a professional cycling team that competes on the UCI Women's World Tour.
