= 2026 UAE Tour Women =

Emirati cycling race

2026 UCI Women's World Tour, race 3 of 26

Race details
- Dates: 5–8 February 2026
- Stages: 4
- Distance: 533 km (331 mi)
- Winning time: 13h 06' 32"

Results
Jersey awarded to the overall winner	Winner	Elisa Longo Borghini (ITA)	(UAE Team ADQ)
	Second	Monica Trinca Colonel (ITA)	(Liv AlUla Jayco)
	Third	Femke de Vries (NED)	(Visma–Lease a Bike)
Jersey awarded to the points classification winner	Points	Lorena Wiebes (NED)	(Team SD Worx–Protime)
Jersey awarded to the young rider classification winner	Young rider	Eleonora Ciabocco (ITA)	(Team Picnic–PostNL)
Jersey awarded to the sprints classification winner	Sprints	Sara Luccon (ITA)	(Top Girls Fassa Bortolo)
	Team	(Germany) Canyon//SRAM Zondacrypto	

The 2026 UAE Tour Women was a road cycling stage race that took place between 5 and 8 February in the United Arab Emirates. It was the fourth edition of the UAE Tour Women, and the third race of the 2026 UCI Women's World Tour.

The race was won by Italian rider Elisa Longo Borghini of UAE Team ADQ for the third time.

== Teams ==
Fourteen UCI Women's WorldTeams, three UCI Women's ProTeams and three UCI Women's Continental Teams participated in the race.

- AG Insurance–Soudal
- Canyon//SRAM Zondacrypto
- EF Education–Oatly
- FDJ United–Suez
- Fenix–Premier Tech
- Human Powered Health
- Lidl–Trek
- Liv AlUla Jayco
- Movistar Team
- Team Picnic–PostNL
- Team SD Worx–Protime
- UAE Team ADQ
- Uno-X Mobility
- Visma–Lease a Bike

UCI Women's ProTeams

- Cofidis
- St. Michel–Preference Home–Auber93
- VolkerWessels Women Cyclingteam

UCI Women's Continental Teams

- Hitec Products–Fluid Control
- Top Girls Fassa Bortolo
- Vini Fantini–BePink

== Route ==
Stage characteristics and winners
Stage	Date	Course	Distance	Type	Stage winner
1	5 February	Al Mirfa to Madinat Zayed	111 km (69 mi)	Flat stage	Lorena Wiebes (NED)
2	6 February	Dubai Police Academy to Hamdan Bin Mohammed Smart University	145 km (90 mi)	Flat stage	Lorena Wiebes (NED)
3	7 February	Abu Dhabi TeamLab Phenomena to Abu Dhabi Breakwater	121 km (75 mi)	Flat stage	Lorena Wiebes (NED)
4	8 February	Al Ain Hazza Bin Zayed Stadium to Jebel Hafeet	156 km (97 mi)	Mountain stage	Elisa Longo Borghini (ITA)
Total			533 km (331 mi)		

== Stages ==
=== Stage 1 ===
5 February 2026 — Al Mirfa to Madinat Zayed, 111 km (69 mi)

Stage 1 Result
Rank	Rider	Team	Time
1	Lorena Wiebes (NED)	Team SD Worx–Protime	2h 26' 17"
2	Lara Gillespie (IRL)	UAE Team ADQ	+ 0"
3	Zoe Bäckstedt (GBR)	Canyon//SRAM Zondacrypto	+ 0"
4	Maggie Coles-Lyster (CAN)	Human Powered Health	+ 0"
5	Martina Alzini (ITA)	Cofidis	+ 0"
6	Gladys Verhulst-Wild (FRA)	AG Insurance–Soudal	+ 0"
7	Georgia Baker (AUS)	Liv AlUla Jayco	+ 0"
8	Emma Norsgaard (DEN)	Lidl–Trek	+ 0"
9	Rachele Barbieri (ITA)	Team Picnic–PostNL	+ 0"
10	Carys Lloyd (GBR)	Movistar Team	+ 0"

General classification after Stage 1
Rank	Rider	Team	Time
1	Lorena Wiebes (NED)	Team SD Worx–Protime	2h 26' 07"
2	Lara Gillespie (IRL)	UAE Team ADQ	+ 4"
3	Zoe Bäckstedt (GBR)	Canyon//SRAM Zondacrypto	+ 6"
4	Femke de Vries (NED)	Visma–Lease a Bike	+ 7"
5	Franziska Koch (GER)	FDJ United–Suez	+ 8"
6	Alison Jackson (CAN)	St. Michel–Preference Home–Auber93	+ 9"
7	Maggie Coles-Lyster (CAN)	Human Powered Health	+ 10"
8	Martina Alzini (ITA)	Cofidis	+ 10"
9	Gladys Verhulst-Wild (FRA)	AG Insurance–Soudal	+ 10"
10	Georgia Baker (AUS)	Liv AlUla Jayco	+ 10"

=== Stage 2 ===
6 February 2026 – Dubai Police Academy to Hamdan Bin Mohammed Smart University, 145 km (90 mi)

Stage 2 Result
Rank	Rider	Team	Time
1	Lorena Wiebes (NED)	Team SD Worx–Protime	3h 38' 44"
2	Chiara Consonni (ITA)	Canyon//SRAM Zondacrypto	+ 0"
3	Nienke Veenhoven (NED)	Visma–Lease a Bike	+ 0"
4	Vittoria Guazzini (ITA)	FDJ United–Suez	+ 0"
5	Lara Gillespie (IRL)	UAE Team ADQ	+ 0"
6	Amalie Dideriksen (DEN)	Cofidis	+ 0"
7	Georgia Baker (AUS)	Liv AlUla Jayco	+ 0"
8	Gladys Verhulst-Wild (FRA)	AG Insurance–Soudal	+ 0"
9	Charlotte Kool (NED)	Fenix–Premier Tech	+ 0"
10	Maggie Coles-Lyster (CAN)	Human Powered Health	+ 0"

General classification after Stage 2
Rank	Rider	Team	Time
1	Lorena Wiebes (NED)	Team SD Worx–Protime	6h 04' 41"
2	Lara Gillespie (IRL)	UAE Team ADQ	+ 14"
3	Chiara Consonni (ITA)	Canyon//SRAM Zondacrypto	+ 14"
4	Zoe Bäckstedt (GBR)	Canyon//SRAM Zondacrypto	+ 16"
5	Nienke Veenhoven (NED)	Visma–Lease a Bike	+ 16"
6	Femke de Vries (NED)	Visma–Lease a Bike	+ 17"
7	Franziska Koch (GER)	FDJ United–Suez	+ 18"
8	Alison Jackson (CAN)	St. Michel–Preference Home–Auber93	+ 19"
9	Georgia Baker (AUS)	Liv AlUla Jayco	+ 20"
10	Gladys Verhulst-Wild (FRA)	AG Insurance–Soudal	+ 20"

=== Stage 3 ===
7 February 2026 – Abu Dhabi TeamLab Phenomena to Abu Dhabi Breakwater, 121 km (75 mi)

Stage 3 Result
Rank	Rider	Team	Time
1	Lorena Wiebes (NED)	Team SD Worx–Protime	2h 48' 37"
2	Lara Gillespie (IRL)	UAE Team ADQ	+ 0"
3	Amalie Dideriksen (DEN)	Cofidis	+ 0"
4	Nienke Veenhoven (NED)	Visma–Lease a Bike	+ 0"
5	Vittoria Guazzini (ITA)	FDJ United–Suez	+ 0"
6	Chiara Consonni (ITA)	Canyon//SRAM Zondacrypto	+ 0"
7	Georgia Baker (AUS)	Liv AlUla Jayco	+ 0"
8	Charlotte Kool (NED)	Fenix–Premier Tech	+ 0"
9	Gladys Verhulst-Wild (FRA)	AG Insurance–Soudal	+ 0"
10	Maggie Coles-Lyster (CAN)	Human Powered Health	+ 0"

General classification after Stage 3
Rank	Rider	Team	Time
1	Lorena Wiebes (NED)	Team SD Worx–Protime	8h 53' 08"
2	Lara Gillespie (IRL)	UAE Team ADQ	+ 18"
3	Zoe Bäckstedt (GBR)	Canyon//SRAM Zondacrypto	+ 23"
4	Chiara Consonni (ITA)	Canyon//SRAM Zondacrypto	+ 24"
5	Franziska Koch (GER)	FDJ United–Suez	+ 25"
6	Nienke Veenhoven (NED)	Visma–Lease a Bike	+ 26"
7	Amalie Dideriksen (DEN)	Cofidis	+ 26"
8	Femke de Vries (NED)	Visma–Lease a Bike	+ 27"
9	Gladys Verhulst-Wild (FRA)	AG Insurance–Soudal	+ 28"
10	Alison Jackson (CAN)	St. Michel–Preference Home–Auber93	+ 29"

=== Stage 4 ===
8 February 2026 – Al Ain Hazza Bin Zayed Stadium to Jebel Hafeet, 156 km (97 mi)

Stage 4 Result
Rank	Rider	Team	Time
1	Elisa Longo Borghini (ITA)	UAE Team ADQ	4h 13' 04"
2	Monica Trinca Colonel (ITA)	Liv AlUla Jayco	+ 12"
3	Femke de Vries (NED)	Visma–Lease a Bike	+ 14"
4	Kimberley Le Court (MRI)	AG Insurance–Soudal	+ 57"
5	Katarzyna Niewiadoma (POL)	Canyon//SRAM Zondacrypto	+ 59"
6	Eleonora Ciabocco (ITA)	Team Picnic–PostNL	+ 1' 15"
7	Niamh Fisher-Black (NZL)	Lidl–Trek	+ 1' 19"
8	Steffi Häberlin (SUI)	Team SD Worx–Protime	+ 1' 35"
9	Justine Ghekiere (BEL)	AG Insurance–Soudal	+ 1' 37"
10	Juliette Berthet (FRA)	FDJ United–Suez	+ 1' 38"

General classification after Stage 4
Rank	Rider	Team	Time
1	Elisa Longo Borghini (ITA)	UAE Team ADQ	13h 06' 32"
2	Monica Trinca Colonel (ITA)	Liv AlUla Jayco	+ 16"
3	Femke de Vries (NED)	Visma–Lease a Bike	+ 17"
4	Kimberley Le Court (MRI)	AG Insurance–Soudal	+ 1' 07"
5	Katarzyna Niewiadoma (POL)	Canyon//SRAM Zondacrypto	+ 1' 09"
6	Eleonora Ciabocco (ITA)	Team Picnic–PostNL	+ 1' 25"
7	Niamh Fisher-Black (NZL)	Lidl–Trek	+ 1' 29"
8	Steffi Häberlin (SUI)	Team SD Worx–Protime	+ 1' 45"
9	Justine Ghekiere (BEL)	AG Insurance–Soudal	+ 1' 47"
10	Juliette Berthet (FRA)	FDJ United–Suez	+ 1' 48"

== Classification leadership table ==
Classification leadership by stage
Stage	Winner	General classification	Points classification	Sprints classification	Young rider classification	Team classification
1	Lorena Wiebes	Lorena Wiebes	Lorena Wiebes	Femke de Vries	Zoe Bäckstedt	AG Insurance–Soudal
2	Lorena Wiebes	Lorena Wiebes	Lorena Wiebes	Sara Luccon	Zoe Bäckstedt	Canyon//SRAM Zondacrypto
3	Lorena Wiebes	Lorena Wiebes	Lorena Wiebes	Franziska Koch	Zoe Bäckstedt	FDJ United–Suez
4	Elisa Longo Borghini	Elisa Longo Borghini	Lorena Wiebes	Sara Luccon	Eleonora Ciabocco	Canyon//SRAM Zondacrypto
Final		Elisa Longo Borghini	Lorena Wiebes	Sara Luccon	Eleonora Ciabocco	Canyon//SRAM zondacrypto

== Classification standings ==
Legend
Denotes the winner of the general classification	Denotes the winner of the sprints classification
Denotes the winner of the points classification	Denotes the winner of the young rider classification

=== General classification ===
Final general classification (1–10)
Rank	Rider	Team	Time
1	Elisa Longo Borghini (ITA)	UAE Team ADQ	13h 06' 32"
2	Monica Trinca Colonel (ITA)	Liv AlUla Jayco	+ 16"
3	Femke de Vries (NED)	Visma–Lease a Bike	+ 17"
4	Kimberley Le Court (MRI)	AG Insurance–Soudal	+ 1' 07"
5	Katarzyna Niewiadoma (POL)	Canyon//SRAM Zondacrypto	+ 1' 09"
6	Eleonora Ciabocco (ITA)	Team Picnic–PostNL	+ 1' 25"
7	Niamh Fisher-Black (NZL)	Lidl–Trek	+ 1' 29"
8	Steffi Häberlin (SUI)	Team SD Worx–Protime	+ 1' 45"
9	Justine Ghekiere (BEL)	AG Insurance–Soudal	+ 1' 47"
10	Juliette Berthet (FRA)	FDJ United–Suez	+ 1' 48"

=== Points classification ===
Final points classification (1–10)
Rank	Rider	Team	Points
1	Lorena Wiebes (NED)	Team SD Worx–Protime	60
2	Lara Gillespie (IRL)	UAE Team ADQ	53
3	Sara Luccon (ITA)	Top Girls Fassa Bortolo	21
4	Vittoria Guazzini (ITA)	FDJ United–Suez	21
5	Chiara Consonni (ITA)	Canyon//SRAM Zondacrypto	21
6	Nienke Veenhoven (NED)	Visma–Lease a Bike	21
7	Elisa Longo Borghini (ITA)	UAE Team ADQ	20
8	Femke de Vries (NED)	Visma–Lease a Bike	20
9	Zoe Bäckstedt (GBR)	Canyon//SRAM Zondacrypto	20
10	Franziska Koch (GER)	FDJ United–Suez	20

=== Sprints classification ===
Final sprints classification (1–10)
Rank	Rider	Team	Points
1	Sara Luccon (ITA)	Top Girls Fassa Bortolo	21
2	Franziska Koch (GER)	FDJ United–Suez	20
3	Lara Gillespie (IRL)	UAE Team ADQ	14
4	Sonia Rossetti (ITA)	Vini Fantini–BePink	13
5	Margaux Vigié (FRA)	Visma–Lease a Bike	9
6	Femke de Vries (NED)	Visma–Lease a Bike	8
7	Juliette Berthet (FRA)	FDJ United–Suez	8
8	Zoe Bäckstedt (GBR)	Canyon//SRAM Zondacrypto	8
9	Nina Berton (LUX)	EF Education–Oatly	8
10	Gladys Verhulst-Wild (FRA)	AG Insurance–Soudal	6

=== Young rider classification ===
Final young rider classification (1–10)
Rank	Rider	Team	Time
1	Eleonora Ciabocco (ITA)	Team Picnic–PostNL	13h 07' 57"
2	Zoe Bäckstedt (GBR)	Canyon//SRAM Zondacrypto	+ 1' 35"
3	Gaia Segato (ITA)	Vini Fantini–BePink	+ 2' 34"
4	Chiara Reghini (ITA)	Top Girls Fassa Bortolo	+ 3' 44"
5	Francesca Barale (ITA)	Movistar Team	+ 4' 42"
6	Kamilla Aasebø (NOR)	Uno-X Mobility	+ 6' 58"
7	Sofia Arici (ITA)	Vini Fantini–BePink	+ 8' 44"
8	Elisa De Vallier (ITA)	Top Girls Fassa Bortolo	+ 9' 16"
9	Eglantine Rayer (FRA)	FDJ United–Suez	+ 9' 42"
10	Laura Lizette Sander (EST)	Hitec Products–Fluid Control	+ 9' 50"

=== Teams classification ===
Final team classification (1–10)
Rank	Team	Time
1	(Germany) Canyon//SRAM Zondacrypto	39h 27' 24"
2	(France) FDJ United–Suez	+ 1' 32"
3	(Belgium) AG Insurance–Soudal	+ 2' 02"
4	(Netherlands) Team Picnic–PostNL	+ 3' 28"
5	(Germany) Lidl–Trek	+ 4' 45"
6	(United Arab Emirates) UAE Team ADQ	+ 6' 15"
7	(Netherlands) Visma–Lease a Bike	+ 7' 06"
8	(United States) Human Powered Health	+ 7' 38"
9	(Australia) Liv AlUla Jayco	+ 9' 12"
10	(Spain) Movistar Team	+ 9' 52"
