= Monica Trinca Colonel =

Italian cyclist (born 1999)

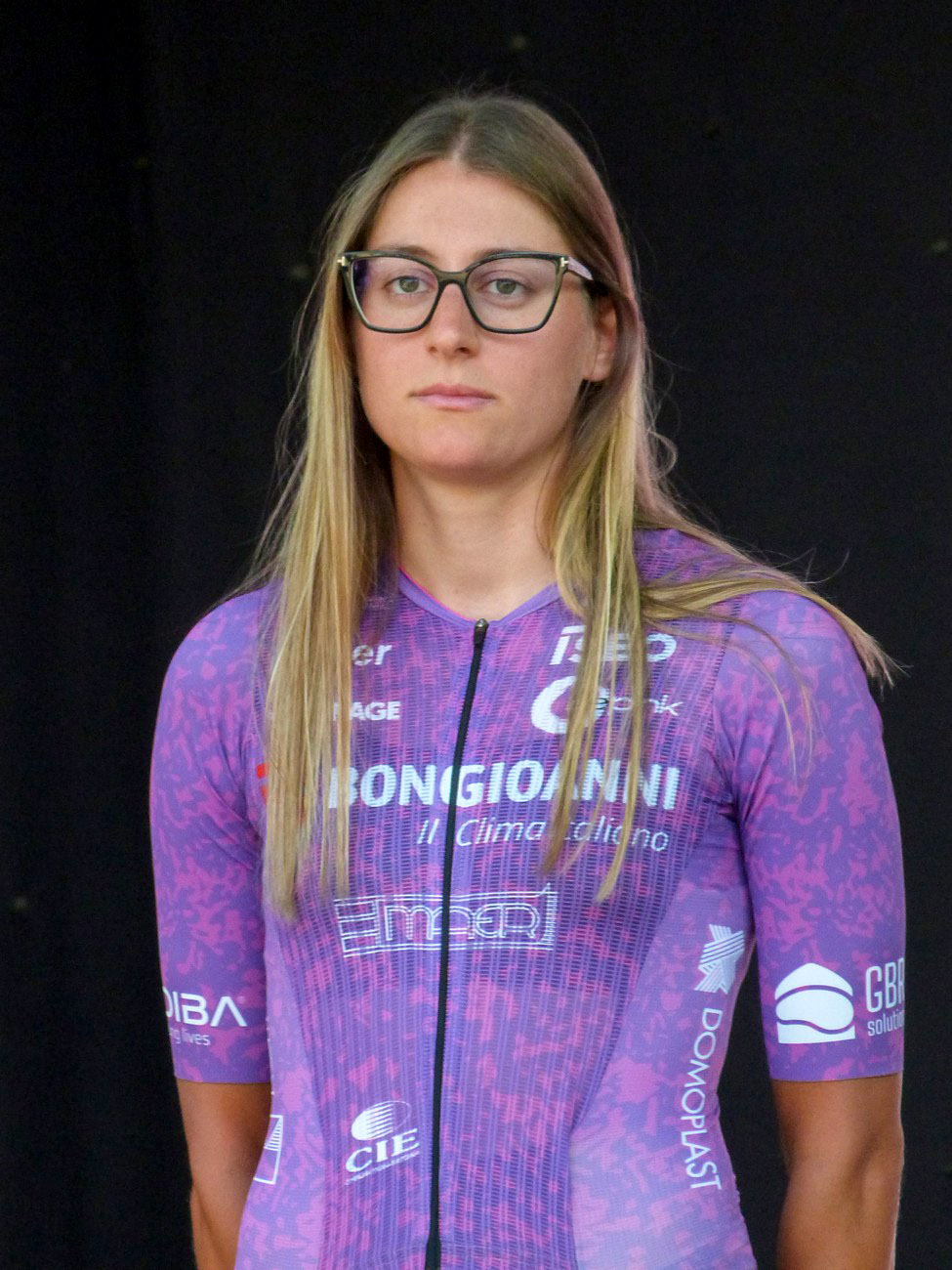
- Trinca Colonel in 2024

Personal information
- Born: 21 May 1999 (age 27) Grosotto, Italy

Cycling career
- Sport: Cycling
- Current team: Liv AlUla Jayco
- Discipline: Road
- Role: Rider

Professional teams
- 2024: Bepink–Bongioanni
- 2025–: Liv AlUla Jayco

Monica Trinca Colonel is an Italian professional cyclist, who currently rides for UCI Women's WorldTeam Liv AlUla Jayco.

Trinca Colonel was a successful racer as a junior, but stepped away from cycling at age 15. After years without racing, she returned to amateur races in 2023 while working full-time as an optometrist. She rode with Bepink–Bongioanni for the 2024 season, before signing with Liv AlUla Jayco, reaching the World Tour level after less than a year as a professional. At her debut race with her new team, the 2025 UAE Tour Women, Trinca Colonel finished in fourth overall.

In 2026, she won a historical gold medal with the italian team in the Mixed Relay TTT at the UCI Road World Championships in Montreal, Canada.

== Major results ==
2024
7th Tre Valli Varesine
7th Giro dell'Emilia
2025
National Championships

2nd Road race
5th Time trial

4th Overall UAE Tour
6th Tre Valli Varesine
6th Clasica Femenina Navarra
7th Overall La Vuelta Femenina
8th Trofeo Alfredo Binda
8th Liège–Bastogne–Liège
2026
1st Team relay, UCI Road World Championships
2nd Overall UAE Tour
7th Overall La Vuelta Femenina
8th Strade Bianche Donne

=== General classification results timeline ===
Major Tour results timeline
Stage race	2024	2025	2026
La Vuelta Femenina	26	7	7
Giro d'Italia Women	24	DNF	15
Tour de France Femmes	—	DNF	DNF

Legend
—	Did not compete
DNF	Did not finish
