= Femke de Vries =

Dutch cyclist (born 1994)

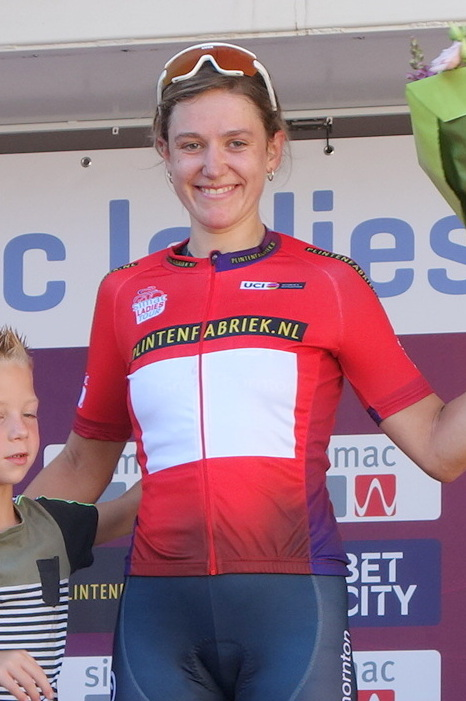
- de Vries in 2023

Personal information
- Born: 16 April 1994 (age 32) Amersfoort, Netherlands

Cycling career
- Sport: Cycling
- Current team: Visma–Lease a Bike
- Discipline: Road
- Role: Rider

Amateur team
- 2020–2021: Loving Potatoes Ladies DJR Cycling Team

Professional teams
- 2022–2024: GT Krush Tunap
- 2024–: Visma–Lease a Bike

Femke de Vries (born 16 April 1994) is a Dutch road and track cyclist, who currently rides for UCI Women's WorldTeam Visma–Lease a Bike.

== Major results ==
2022
6th Overall Gracia–Orlová
2023
8th Dwars door de Westhoek
2024
2nd Overall Tour de Feminin
8th Antwerp Port Epic
9th Overall Tour de la Semois
2025
7th Overall Setmana Ciclista Valenciana
2026
Tour de Suisse

1st Mountains classification
1st Stage 1
5th Overall

3rd Overall UAE Tour
6th Overall Giro d'Italia
