= Colle delle Finestre =

Mountain pass in Piedmont, Northern Italy

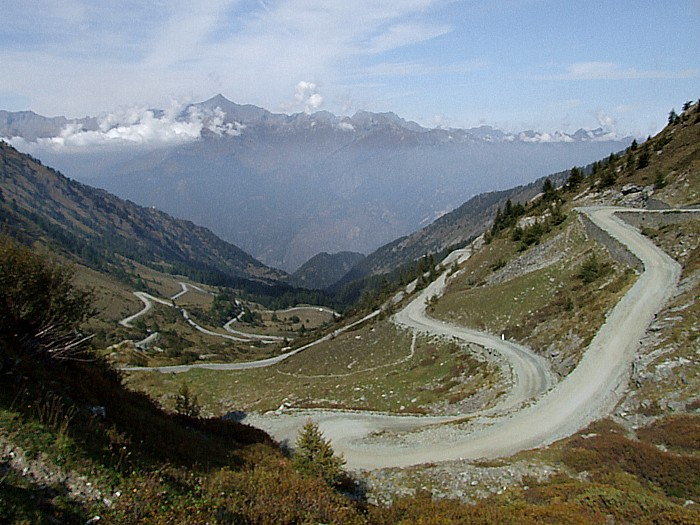

- Location within Alps
- Elevation: 2,178 metres (7,146 ft)

Third Approach
- Location: Piemonte, Italy
- Range: Alps
- Coordinates: 45°04′18.49″N 7°03′12.48″E

Colle delle Finestre (2,178 metres (7,146 ft)) is a mountain pass in the Cottian Alps, in the Italian region of Piemonte, Italy, linking the Susa Valley and Val Chisone. The road was built around 1700 to gain access to the fortresses in the area, mainly the Forte di Fenestrelle.

The road is very popular for both cyclists and motorbikes with magnificent views of the surrounding mountain ranges. It serves as a tourist attraction. From Susa, the mountain pass is 18.5 kilometres (11.5 mi) long at an average of 9.1% (elevation gain: 1,694 metres (5,558 ft)), the maximum gradient being 14%. The final 8 kilometres (5.0 mi) of road leading to the summit from the Susa end have not been asphalted.

== Giro d'Italia ==
The pass was first tackled by the Giro d'Italia in 2005. In 2018, Chris Froome attacked on the climb, gaining over three minutes over rivals and setting up his victory. In 2025, Simon Yates overturned a substantial deficit to his rivals, thereby setting up his victory in the Giro. In 2026, the pass will feature in the Giro d'Italia Women for the first time.

Year	Stage	Category	Start	Finish	Leader at the summit
2005	19	1	Savigliano	Sestriere	Danilo di Luca (ITA)
2011	20	1	Verbania	Sestriere	Vasil Kiryienka (BLR)
2015	20	Cima Coppi	Saint-Vincent	Sestriere	Mikel Landa (ESP)
2018	19	Cima Coppi	Venaria Reale	Bardonecchia (Jafferau)	Chris Froome (GBR)
2025	20	Cima Coppi	Verrès	Sestriere	Chris Harper (AUS)

== See also ==
- List of highest paved roads in Europe
- List of mountain passes
- Cycling Details for Colle delle Finestre
