= Valentina Cavallar =

Austrian cyclist and former rower

- Cavallar in 2025

Personal information
- Born: 7 March 2001 (age 25) Vienna, Austria

Cycling career
- Sport: Cycling
- Current team: Team SD Worx–Protime
- Discipline: Road
- Role: Rider

Professional teams
- 2024–2025: Arkéa–B&B Hotels Women
- 2026–: Team SD Worx–Protime

Valentina Cavallar (born 7 March 2001) is an Austrian professional cyclist and former rower, who currently rides for UCI Women's WorldTeam Team SD Worx–Protime.

As a rower, she competed in the women's lightweight double sculls event at the 2020 Summer Olympics.

In 2023, she turned to cycling, joining the Arkéa–B&B Hotels Women team in 2024. She made her Women's WorldTour debut at La Flèche Wallonne in that year, and Liège-Bastogne-Liège. Competing in the three-day Itzulia Women, Cavallar, took the polka-dot mountain jersey on stages one and two (along with the most combative rider award for stage two), but lost it on stage three to Demi Vollering (who was also the overall winner of the race). She also competed in the Tour de France Femmes 2024.

== Major results ==
2024
2nd Road race, National Championships
2nd Overall Tour Féminin International des Pyrénées
4th Alpes Gresivaudan Classic
2025 (1 pro win)
1st Alpes Gresivaudan Classic
3rd Overall Tour Féminin International des Pyrénées
8th Overall Vuelta a Burgos
2026
9th Overall Giro d'Italia
