= Niamh Fisher-Black =

New Zealand road cyclist

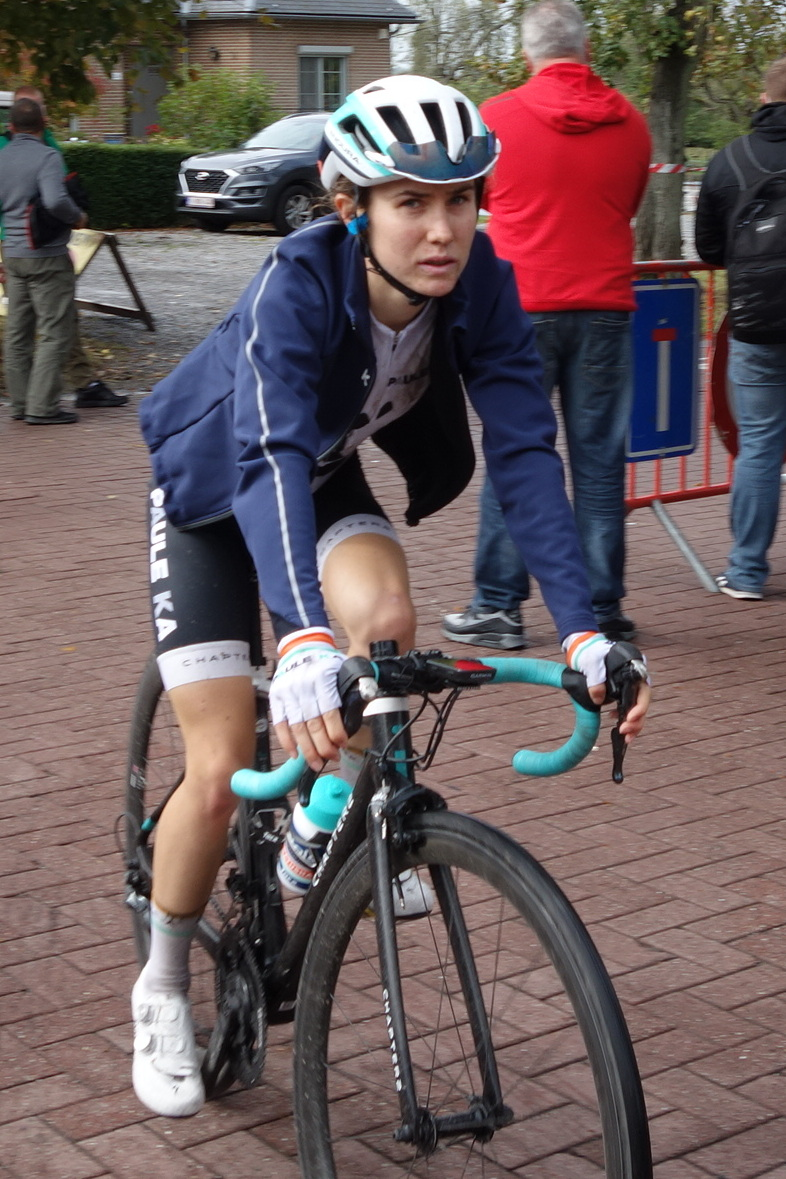
- Fisher-Black at the 2020 La Flèche Wallonne

Personal information
- Full name: Mary Niamh Fisher-Black
- Born: 12 August 2000 (age 26) Nelson, New Zealand
- Height: 1.60 m (5 ft 3 in)

Cycling career
- Sport: Cycling
- Current team: Lidl–Trek
- Disciplines: Road; Cyclo-cross
- Role: Rider

Amateur teams
- 2017–2018: Mike Greer Homes
- 2019: Torelli–Assure–Madison

Professional teams
- 2019–2020: Bigla Pro Cycling
- 2021–2024: SD Worx
- 2025–: Lidl–Trek

Major wins
- Major Tours Giro d'Italia Young rider classification (2021, 2022) 1 individual stage (2024) One-day races and Classics National Road Race Championships (2020)
Medal record
Women's road bicycle racing
Representing New Zealand
World Championships
| Gold medal – first place | 2022 Wollongong | Under-23 road race |
| Silver medal – second place | 2025 Kigali | Road race |

Niamh Fisher-Black (born 12 August 2000) is a New Zealand professional racing cyclist, who currently rides for UCI Women's WorldTeam Lidl–Trek. She won the gold medal in the under-23 road race at the 2022 World Championships and the silver medal in the elite women's road race at the 2025 World Championships.

== Early life and education ==
Fisher-Black is the older sister of fellow racing cyclist Finn Fisher-Black, and was educated at Nelson College for Girls.

== Career ==
=== 2022 ===
Fisher-Black paid her own way to the 2022 road cycling world championships in Wollongong, Australia as Cycling New Zealand could not afford to meet the costs due to "a lack of government funding and the loss of key sponsors". In the 164 km road race, she was the first placed under-23 rider and 12th overall. She became the first under-23 world women's champion. Fisher-Black said of the win “I wasn't aware straightaway at first when I crossed the line [that I'd won the under-23 race]." “The rainbow jersey, very few people have one and it’s the pinnacle of cycling so it’s super special to have...I think I showed I was the strongest under-23 rider on the day and nothing can take away from that.”

=== 2023 ===
In June 2023, Fisher-Black won the final stage of the Tour de Suisse Women. She said, of the victory, "Winning is the very best feeling...Finally I could throw my hands in the air myself. This is what you live for as a cyclist". She was named as the lead rider for Team SD Worx in the women's Giro d'Italia.

=== 2025 ===
In September 2025, Fisher-Black became the first New Zealander to stand on the podium at the elite road race at the UCI World Championships when she came second in Kigali, Rwanda. She said of the race: “It didn’t really feel like we were racing, the race didn’t feel hard at all...Once I saw I was in a position to win I knew where my strong points were and tried...But Magdeleine [Vallieres], I didn’t even anticipate that she would try on the cobbles but she rode away from me and I have to give it to her, she was the strongest rider.” Fisher-Black had to fund herself to attend, as Cycling New Zealand was not in a position to fund riders to attend the world championships.

== Major results ==
2016
1st National Junior CX Championships
2017
1st National Junior CX Championships
3rd Road race, National Junior Road Championships
2018
9th Road race, Oceania Junior Road Championships
2019
4th Road race, National Junior Road Championships
9th Gravel and Tar
2020
1st Road race, National Road Championships
National Under-23 Road Championships

1st Road race
3rd Time trial

1st Gravel and Tar
2021
1st Young rider classification, Vuelta a Burgos
1st Young rider classification, Tour of Norway
9th Overall Giro Rosa

1st Young rider classification

2022
1st Road race, UCI Road World Under-23 Championships
1st Young rider classification, Grand Prix Elsy Jacobs
5th Overall Giro Donne

1st Young rider classification

5th Durango-Durango Emakumeen Saria
7th Overall Itzulia Tour

1st Young rider classification

2023
8th Gravel World Championships
8th Overall Tour de Suisse

1st Young rider classification
1st Stage 4

9th Overall Giro Donne
10th Liège–Bastogne–Liège
2024
3rd Overall Setmana Ciclista Valenciana

1st Stage 3

4th Overall Tour de Romandie
7th Overall La Vuelta Femenina
10th Overall Giro d'Italia

1st Stage 3

2025
2nd Road race, UCI Road World Championships
National Road Championships

2nd Road race
5th Time trial

4th Overall Tour de Suisse
5th Overall Tour de France

Combativity award Stage 8

6th Overall La Vuelta Femenina
7th Liège–Bastogne–Liège
7th Cadel Evans Great Ocean Road Race
8th Strade Bianche
9th La Flèche Wallonne
9th Tre Valli Varesine
2026
2nd Overall Faun Tour Femmes

1st Mountains Classification

5th Overall Giro d'Italia
5th Giro dell'Appennino Donne
7th Overall UAE Tour
8th La Flèche Wallonne
10th Strade Bianche
10th Overall Tour de France Femmes
