= Lauren Dickson =

Scottish cyclist (born 2000)

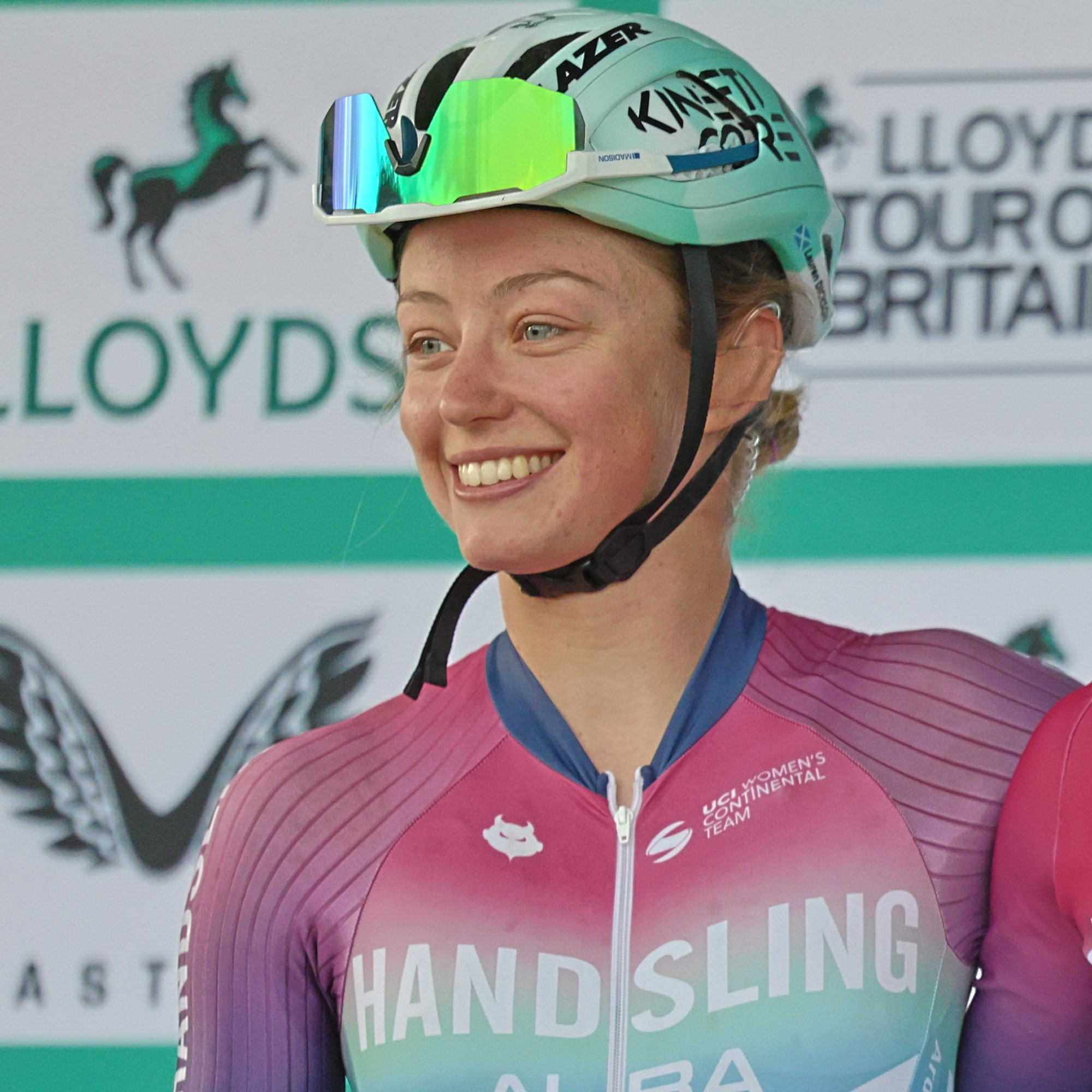
- Dickson in 2025

Personal information
- Born: 26 April 2000 (age 26)

Cycling career
- Sport: Cycling
- Current team: FDJ United–Suez
- Discipline: Road
- Role: Rider

Professional teams
- 2024–2025: Handsling Alba Development Road Team
- 2026–: FDJ–Suez

Lauren Dickson (born 26 April 2000) is a British cyclist from Scotland who rides for UCI Women's World Tour FDJ–Suez.

== Career ==
From Scotland, Dickson started as a junior runner before an injury in 2019 led her to compete in duathlon and triathlon before focusing on road race cycling from 2024. That year, she secured podium finishes at the Lancaster Grand Prix where she finished second riding for Edinburgh RC, and the Ryedale Grasscrete Grand Prix where she finished second after gaining a mid-season contract with Alba Development RT. She also claimed a victory at the Scottish National Hill Climb Championship.

She won the Lincoln Grand Prix and placed third overall at the Tour of Norway. Riding for the Handsling Alba Development Road Team she finished seventeenth overall on her World Tour debut at the 2025 Tour of Britain Women. In June 2025, she had a top-ten finish at the British National Time Trial Championships. Later that year she signed a two-year contract with FDJ–Suez, the number one ranked team on the UCI Women's World Tour.

On 13 September 2026, Dickson claimed her first professional win with victory on stage four of the Faun Tour Femmes. In October, she had top-ten finish in the time-trial at the 2026 European Road Championships in Ljubljana, Slovenia, placing eighth overall.

== Major results ==
2026
3rd Overall Itzulia Women

== Personal life ==
From Edinburgh, she has been in a relationship with fellow cyclist Sean Flynn since they were both in high school.
