= Stina Kagevi =

Swedish cyclist

- Kagevi in 2024

Personal information
- Born: 28 August 2005 (age 21) Stockholm, Sweden

Cycling career
- Sport: Cycling
- Current team: EF Education–Oatly
- Disciplines: Road; Cyclo-cross
- Role: Rider

Professional teams
- 2024–2025: Team Coop–Repsol
- 2026–: EF Education–Oatly
Medal record
Representing Sweden
Women's road bicycle racing
European Championships
Silver medal – second place	2023 Drenthe	Junior time trial

Stina Kagevi (born 28 August 2005) is a Swedish professional racing cyclist, who currently rides for UCI Women's WorldTeam EF Education–Oatly.

== Major results ==
2022
National Junior Road Championships

1st Road race
2nd Time trial

2023
National Junior Road Championships

1st Road race
1st Time trial

2nd Time trial, UEC European Junior Road Championships
2024
1st Stage 1 (ITT) Tour de Pologne Women
3rd Time trial, National Road Championships
5th Time trial, UEC European Under-23 Road Championships
7th Overall Volta a Portugal

1st Stage 5 (ITT)

8th Overall Vuelta a Extremadura Femenina
2025
1st Time trial, National Road Championships
5th Time trial, UEC European Under-23 Road Championships
10th Overall Vuelta a Extremadura Femenina
