= Mirre Knaven =

Dutch cyclist (born 2004)

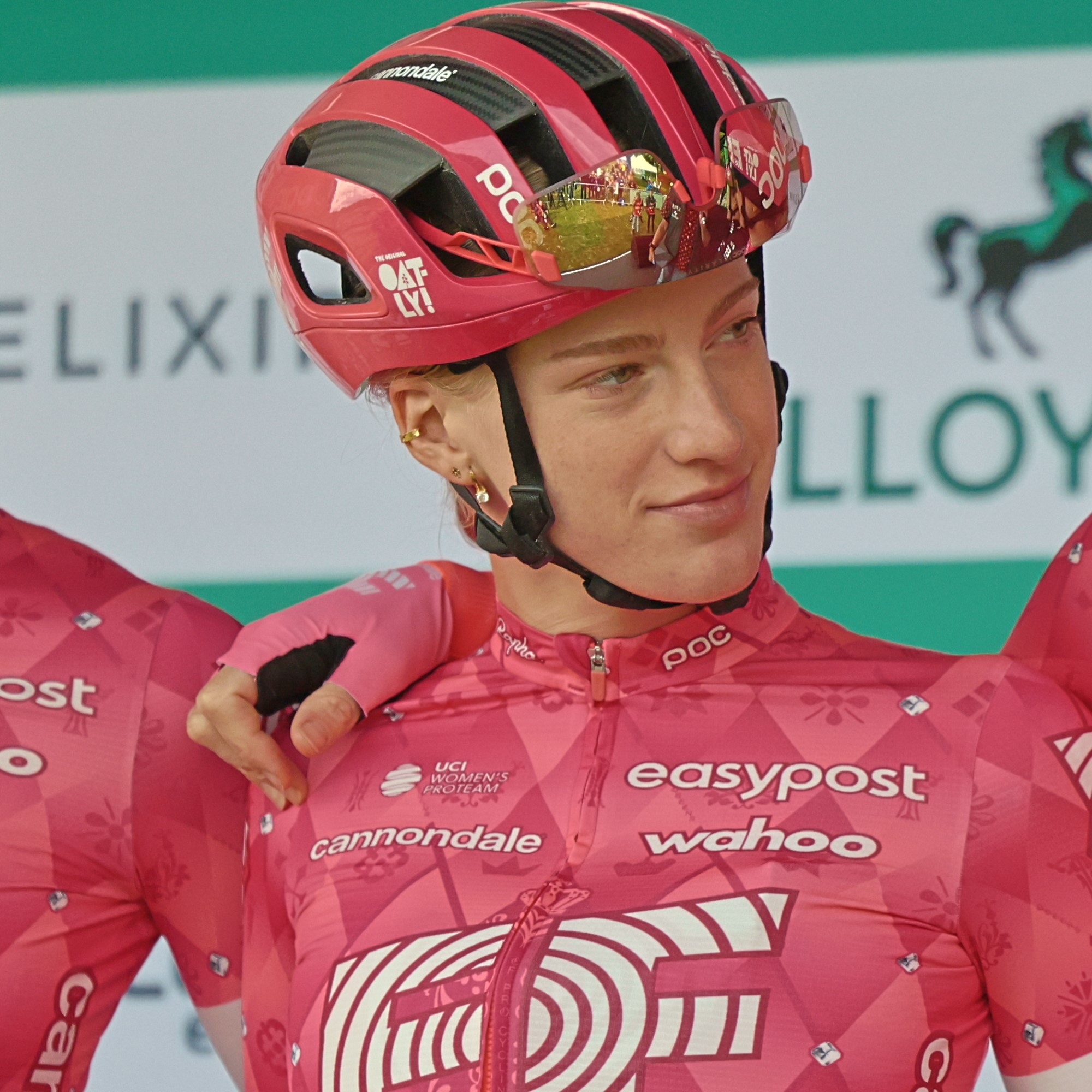
- Knaven at the 2025 Tour of Britain Women

Personal information
- Born: 18 August 2004 (age 22)

Cycling career
- Sport: Cycling
- Current team: EF Education–Oatly
- Disciplines: Road; Cyclo-cross
- Role: Rider

Professional teams
- 2023–2024: AG Insurance–NXTG U23
- 2024–: EF Education–Cannondale

Mirre Knaven (born 18 August 2004) is a Dutch professional racing cyclist, who currently rides for the UCI Women's ProTeam EF Education–Oatly.

== Career ==
Knaven is the daughter of Servais Knaven, the winner of the 2001 Paris-Roubaix, and Natascha den Ouden, a three-time cyclocross champion. Originally a gymnast, she transitioned to biking in her teenage years.

She achieved her first win at the Gracia–Orlová in 2024, winning a sprint and also being named best young rider. She went on to win the final stage of the Tour de Feminin later that year, along with the Queen Of The Mountains jersey.

She then joined EF Pro Cycling in 2024, debuting at the Thuringen Ladies Tour. This put her under the management of both her father and mother.

== Major results ==
2021
2nd Time trial, National Junior Road Championships
2022
2nd Time trial, National Junior Road Championships
5th Overall Omloop van Borsele Juniors
2023
3rd GP Eco-Struct
5th Trofee Maarten Wynants
2024
Tour de Feminin

1st Mountains classification
1st Stage 4

2nd Overall Gracia–Orlová

1st Points classification
1st Young rider classification
1st Stage 2

4th Trofee Maarten Wynants
5th Scheldeprijs
7th SPAR Flanders Diamond Tour
8th Omloop van Borsele
