= St. Michel–Preference Home–Auber93 (women's team) =

French cycling team

St Michel–Preference Home–Auber93
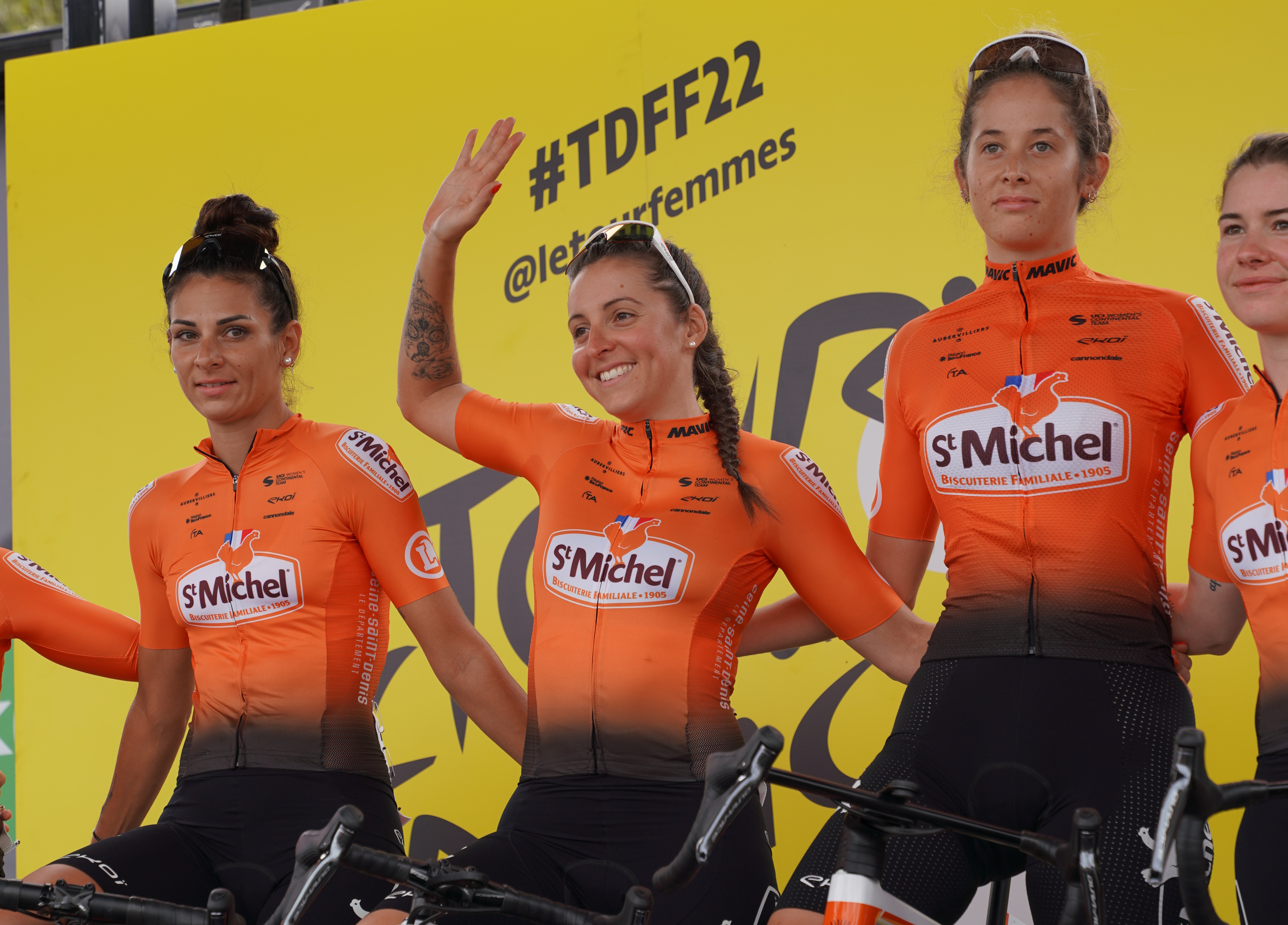
- Riders at the 2022 Tour de France Femmes

Team information
- UCI code: AUB (2012–)
- Registered: France
- Founded: 2012
- Discipline: Road
- Status: National (2012–2021); UCI Women's Continental Team (2022–2024); UCI Women's ProTeam (2025–)

Team name history
- 2012–2014 2015 2016 2017 2018–2022 2023–2024 2025–: BigMat–Auber93; Auber93; HP BTP–Auber93; CM Aubervilliers 93; St Michel–Auber93; St. Michel–Mavic–Auber93; St Michel–Preference Home–Auber93

St Michel–Preference Home–Auber93 is a French women's road cycling team that was founded in 2012, before registering with the UCI for the 2022 season. In 2025, the team became one of seven UCI Women's ProTeams, the second tier of professional women's teams. The team has taken part in all five editions of the Tour de France Femmes, having been invited by the organisers.

The team is sponsored by French biscuit maker Saint-Michel and property developer Preference Home. Auber93 references the founding of the men's team in Aubervilliers, Île-de-France in 1993.

== Major results ==
2012
Wanze, Roxane Fournier
Stage 3 Tour de Bretagne, Roxane Fournier
2013
Stage 4 Tour de Bretagne, Roxane Fournier
2022
Stage 7 Tour Cycliste Féminin International de l'Ardèche, Coralie Demay
2023
GP Oetingen, Simone Boilard
2024
Alpes Gresivaudan Classic, Marion Bunel

== World, continental & national champions ==
2015
European Cyclocross (Masters 30–34), Alna Burato
European Cyclocross (Masters 40–44), Karine Temporelli
2016
European Cyclocross (Masters 30–34), Alna Burato
European Cyclocross (Masters 40–44), Karine Temporelli
World Cyclocross (Masters 30–34), Alna Burato
World Cyclocross (Masters 40–44), Karine Temporelli
2019
France Junior Track (Individual pursuit), Kristina Nenadovic
2021
France Track (Individual pursuit), Kristina Nenadovic
