= List of teams and cyclists in the 2026 Tour de France Femmes =

List of cyclists

The following is a list of teams and riders that will participate in the 2026 Tour de France Femmes.

== Teams ==
Twenty-one teams will take part in the race, one fewer than in previous editions. The teams were announced on 18 February 2026. All 14 UCI Women's WorldTeams were automatically invited. They were joined by seven UCI Women's ProTeams selected by ASO, the organisers of the Tour.

=== UCI Women's WorldTeams ===
- AG Insurance–Soudal
- Canyon//SRAM
- EF Education–Oatly
- FDJ United–Suez
- Fenix–Premier Tech
- Human Powered Health
- Lidl–Trek
- Liv AlUla Jayco
- Movistar Team
- Team Picnic–PostNL
- Team SD Worx–Protime
- UAE Team L'Imad
- Uno-X Mobility
- Visma–Lease a Bike

=== UCI Women's ProTeams ===
- Cofidis
- Laboral Kutxa–Fundación Euskadi
- Lotto–Intermarché Ladies
- Ma Petite Entreprise
- Mayenne Monbana My Pie
- St. Michel–Preference Home–Auber93
- VolkerWessels Women Cyclingteam

== Cyclists ==
Legend
No.	Starting number worn by the rider during the Tour
Pos.	Position in the general classification
Time	Deficit to the winner of the general classification
‡	Denotes riders born on or after 1 January 2003 eligible for the young rider classification
General classification	Denotes the winner of the general classification
Points classification	Denotes the winner of the points classification
Mountains classification	Denotes the winner of the mountains classification
Young rider classification	Denotes the winner of the young rider classification (eligibility indicated by ‡)
Team classification	Denotes riders that represent the winner of the team classification
Super-combativity award	Denotes the winner of the super-combativity award
DNS	Denotes a rider who did not start a stage, followed by the stage before which she withdrew
DNF	Denotes a rider who did not finish a stage, followed by the stage in which she withdrew
DSQ	Denotes a rider who was disqualified from the race, followed by the stage in which this occurred
OTL	Denotes a rider finished outside the time limit, followed by the stage in which they did so
Ages correct as of Saturday 1 August 2026, the date on which the Tour begins

=== By starting number ===
No.	Name	Nationality	Team	Age	Pos.	Time	Ref.
1	Pauline Ferrand-Prévot	France	Visma–Lease a Bike	34	DNS-8	–	
2	Marion Bunel ‡	France	Visma–Lease a Bike	21	35	+ 1h 13' 25"	
3	Femke de Vries	Netherlands	Visma–Lease a Bike	32	12	+ 24' 08"	
4	Daniek Hengeveld ‡	Netherlands	Visma–Lease a Bike	23	78	+ 2h 07' 20"	
5	Lieke Nooijen	Netherlands	Visma–Lease a Bike	25	53	+ 1h 41' 01"	
6	Sarah Van Dam	Canada	Visma–Lease a Bike	24	24	+ 53' 07"	
7	Marianne Vos	Netherlands	Visma–Lease a Bike	39	DNF-9	–	
11	Demi Vollering	Netherlands	FDJ United–Suez	29	1	30h 54' 51"	
12	Juliette Berthet	France	FDJ United–Suez	27	15	+ 28' 12"	
13	Célia Gery ‡	France	FDJ United–Suez	20	21	+ 44' 08"	
14	Franziska Koch	Germany	FDJ United–Suez	26	41	+ 1h 23' 13"	
15	Amber Kraak	Netherlands	FDJ United–Suez	32	73	+ 2h 01' 56"	
16	Marie Le Net	France	FDJ United–Suez	26	96	+ 2h 26' 23"	
17	Évita Muzic	France	FDJ United–Suez	27	52	+ 1h 40' 10"	
21	Katarzyna Niewiadoma-Phinney	Poland	Canyon//SRAM	31	2	+ 1' 18"	
22	Zoe Bäckstedt ‡	Great Britain	Canyon//SRAM	21	50	+ 1h 34' 15"	
23	Chiara Consonni	Italy	Canyon//SRAM	27	101	+ 2h 36' 45"	
24	Rosa Klöser	Germany	Canyon//SRAM	30	43	+ 1h 26' 21"	
25	Antonia Niedermaier ‡	Germany	Canyon//SRAM	23	4	+ 5' 10"	
26	Soraya Paladin	Italy	Canyon//SRAM	33	74	+ 2h 02' 07"	
27	Agnieszka Skalniak-Sójka	Poland	Canyon//SRAM	29	55	+ 1h 42' 56"	
31	Dominika Włodarczyk	Poland	UAE Team L'Imad	25	7	+ 7' 53"	
32	Paula Blasi ‡	Spain	UAE Team L'Imad	23	5	+ 6' 13"	
33	Brodie Chapman	Australia	UAE Team L'Imad	35	DNS-2	–	
34	Mavi García	Spain	UAE Team L'Imad	42	20	+ 41' 50"	
35	Elisa Longo Borghini	Italy	UAE Team L'Imad	34	3	+ 4' 19"	
36	Silvia Persico	Italy	UAE Team L'Imad	29	56	+ 1h 43' 04"	
37	Maëva Squiban	France	UAE Team L'Imad	24	22	+ 45' 45"	
41	Anna van der Breggen	Netherlands	Team SD Worx–Protime	36	DNS-7	–	
42	Mischa Bredewold	Netherlands	Team SD Worx–Protime	26	46	+ 1h 30' 27"	
43	Valentina Cavallar	Austria	Team SD Worx–Protime	25	DNS-9	–	
44	Elena Cecchini	Italy	Team SD Worx–Protime	34	104	+ 2h 38' 22"	
45	Lotte Kopecky	Belgium	Team SD Worx–Protime	30	40	+ 1h 20' 15"	
46	Nienke Vinke ‡	Netherlands	Team SD Worx–Protime	22	11	+ 22' 56"	
47	Lorena Wiebes	Netherlands	Team SD Worx–Protime	27	65	+ 1h 48' 57"	
51	Marlen Reusser	Switzerland	Movistar Team	34	14	+ 25' 57"	
52	Francesca Barale ‡	Italy	Movistar Team	23	85	+ 2h 10' 57"	
53	Ana Vitória Magalhães	Brazil	Movistar Team	25	75	+ 2h 03' 37"	
54	Liane Lippert	Germany	Movistar Team	28	44	+ 1h 27' 22"	
55	Sara Martín	Spain	Movistar Team	27	84	+ 2h 10' 44"	
56	Paula Ostiz ‡	Spain	Movistar Team	19	51	+ 1h 36' 08"	
57	Arlenis Sierra	Cuba	Movistar Team	33	99	+ 2h 33' 46"	
61	Elisa Balsamo	Italy	Lidl–Trek	28	57	+ 1h 43' 10"	
62	Loes Adegeest	Netherlands	Lidl–Trek	29	60	+ 1h 45' 15"	
63	Lucinda Brand	Netherlands	Lidl–Trek	37	36	+ 1h 13' 34"	
64	Niamh Fisher-Black	New Zealand	Lidl–Trek	25	10	+ 15' 14"	
65	Isabella Holmgren ‡	Canada	Lidl–Trek	21	8	+ 9' 12"	
66	Riejanne Markus	Netherlands	Lidl–Trek	31	27	+ 54' 16"	
67	Amanda Spratt	Australia	Lidl–Trek	38	30	+ 57' 54"	
71	Kimberley Le Court-Pienaar	Mauritius	AG Insurance–Soudal	30	9	+ 14' 04"	
72	Mireia Benito	Spain	AG Insurance–Soudal	29	42	+ 1h 24' 51"	
73	Letizia Borghesi	Italy	AG Insurance–Soudal	27	DNF-9	–	
74	Shari Bossuyt	Belgium	AG Insurance–Soudal	25	86	+ 2h 14' 59"	
75	Lore De Schepper ‡	Belgium	AG Insurance–Soudal	20	62	+ 1h 46' 14"	
76	Justine Ghekiere	Belgium	AG Insurance–Soudal	30	25	+ 53' 15"	
77	Urška Žigart	Slovenia	AG Insurance–Soudal	29	48	+ 1h 31' 19"	
81	Magdeleine Vallieres	Canada	EF Education–Oatly	24	18	+ 36' 18"	
82	Nina Berton	Luxembourg	EF Education–Oatly	24	68	+ 1h 53' 28"	
83	Henrietta Christie	New Zealand	EF Education–Oatly	24	82	+ 2h 09' 07"	
84	Kristen Faulkner	United States	EF Education–Oatly	33	26	+ 54' 02"	
85	Cédrine Kerbaol	France	EF Education–Oatly	25	6	+ 6' 41"	
86	Noemi Rüegg	Switzerland	EF Education–Oatly	25	17	+ 33' 20"	
87	Alice Towers ‡	Great Britain	EF Education–Oatly	23	61	+ 1h 46' 12"	
91	Puck Pieterse	Netherlands	Fenix–Premier Tech	24	23	+ 51' 43"	
92	Sara Casasola	Italy	Fenix–Premier Tech	26	33	+ 1h 07' 59"	
93	Lotte Claes	Belgium	Fenix–Premier Tech	33	63	+ 1h 47' 49"	
94	Millie Couzens ‡	Great Britain	Fenix–Premier Tech	22	77	+ 2h 06' 34"	
95	Yara Kastelijn	Netherlands	Fenix–Premier Tech	28	DNF-6	–	
96	Charlotte Kool	Netherlands	Fenix–Premier Tech	27	OTL-7	–	
97	Christina Schweinberger	Austria	Fenix–Premier Tech	29	DNS-2	–	
101	Titia Ryo ‡	France	Human Powered Health	21	47	+ 1h 30' 27"	
102	Nina Buijsman	Netherlands	Human Powered Health	28	16	+ 28' 22"	
103	Carlotta Cipressi ‡	Italy	Human Powered Health	23	80	+ 2h 08' 32"	
104	Thalita de Jong	Netherlands	Human Powered Health	32	13	+ 24' 41"	
105	Barbara Malcotti	Italy	Human Powered Health	26	DNS-6	–	
106	Marit Raaijmakers	Netherlands	Human Powered Health	27	89	+ 2h 18' 17"	
107	Lily Williams	United States	Human Powered Health	32	69	+ 1h 55' 08"	
111	Monica Trinca Colonel	Italy	Liv AlUla Jayco	27	DNS-6	–	
112	Mackenzie Coupland ‡	Australia	Liv AlUla Jayco	20	88	+ 2h 17' 53"	
113	Nadia Gontova	Canada	Liv AlUla Jayco	25	31	+ 59' 34"	
114	Jeanne Korevaar	Netherlands	Liv AlUla Jayco	29	59	+ 1h 43' 44"	
115	Letizia Paternoster	Italy	Liv AlUla Jayco	27	76	+ 2h 06' 11"	
116	Ruby Roseman-Gannon	Australia	Liv AlUla Jayco	27	87	+ 2h 16' 46"	
117	Silke Smulders	Netherlands	Liv AlUla Jayco	25	64	+ 1h 48' 46"	
121	Eleonora Ciabocco ‡	Italy	Team Picnic–PostNL	22	DNF-6	–	
122	Robyn Clay ‡	Great Britain	Team Picnic–PostNL	22	114	+ 2h 55' 19"	
123	Lucie Fityus	Australia	Team Picnic–PostNL	25	112	+ 2h 50' 32"	
124	Pfeiffer Georgi	Great Britain	Team Picnic–PostNL	25	71	+ 1h 57' 20"	
125	Mia Griffin	Ireland	Team Picnic–PostNL	27	115	+ 2h 59' 53"	
126	Gaia Masetti	Italy	Team Picnic–PostNL	24	38	+ 1h 15' 35"	
127	Josie Nelson	Great Britain	Team Picnic–PostNL	24	81	+ 2h 09' 03"	
131	Émilie Morier	France	St. Michel–Preference Home–Auber93	29	19	+ 39' 06"	
132	Heidi Franz	United States	St. Michel–Preference Home–Auber93	31	DNS-9	–	
133	Alicia González Blanco	Spain	St. Michel–Preference Home–Auber93	31	DNF-9	–	
134	India Grangier	France	St. Michel–Preference Home–Auber93	26	DNF-5	–	
135	Alison Jackson	Canada	St. Michel–Preference Home–Auber93	37	DNF-9	–	
136	Solène Muller ‡	France	St. Michel–Preference Home–Auber93	22	34	+ 1h 11' 59"	
137	Caroline Wreszin	United States	St. Michel–Preference Home–Auber93	25	111	+ 2h 50' 08"	
141	Malwina Mul ‡	Poland	Cofidis	22	54	+ 1h 42' 37"	
142	Julie Bego ‡	France	Cofidis	21	83	+ 2h 09' 26"	
143	Ema Comte ‡	France	Cofidis	21	58	+ 1h 43' 13"	
144	Amalie Dideriksen	Denmark	Cofidis	30	93	+ 2h 24' 51"	
145	Victorie Guilman	France	Cofidis	30	108	+ 2h 40' 41"	
146	Hannah Ludwig	Germany	Cofidis	26	DNS-5	–	
147	Nikola Nosková	Czechia	Cofidis	29	DNF-9	–	
151	Usoa Ostolaza	Spain	Laboral Kutxa–Fundación Euskadi	28	70	+ 1h 55' 11"	
152	Naia Amondarain	Spain	Laboral Kutxa–Fundación Euskadi	25	109	+ 2h 41' 33"	
153	Yuliia Biriukova	Ukraine	Laboral Kutxa–Fundación Euskadi	28	92	+ 2h 22' 52"	
154	Idoia Eraso	Spain	Laboral Kutxa–Fundación Euskadi	24	106	+ 2h 39' 09"	
155	Arianna Fidanza	Italy	Laboral Kutxa–Fundación Euskadi	31	102	+ 2h 36' 53"	
156	Paula Patiño	Colombia	Laboral Kutxa–Fundación Euskadi	29	DNS-9	–	
157	Debora Silvestri	Italy	Laboral Kutxa–Fundación Euskadi	28	29	+ 54' 52"	
161	Quinty Schoens	Netherlands	VolkerWessels Women Cyclingteam	27	66	+ 1h 50' 28"	
162	Anneke Dijkstra	Netherlands	VolkerWessels Women Cyclingteam	29	110	+ 2h 47' 26"	
163	Malou Eisen	Netherlands	VolkerWessels Women Cyclingteam	25	97	+ 2h 29' 38"	
164	Eline Jansen	Netherlands	VolkerWessels Women Cyclingteam	24	94	+ 2h 25' 15"	
165	Laura Molenaar	Netherlands	VolkerWessels Women Cyclingteam	24	DNF-2	–	
166	Maud Rijnbeek ‡	Netherlands	VolkerWessels Women Cyclingteam	23	103	+ 2h 37' 43"	
167	Sophie von Berswordt	Netherlands	VolkerWessels Women Cyclingteam	30	DNF-9	–	
171	Katrine Aalerud	Norway	Uno-X Mobility	31	DNS-7	–	
172	Teuntje Beekhuis	Netherlands	Uno-X Mobility	30	DNS-5	–	
173	Marte Berg Edseth	Norway	Uno-X Mobility	27	67	+ 1h 50' 43"	
174	Sigrid Ytterhus Haugset	Norway	Uno-X Mobility	27	28	+ 54' 26"	
175	Anouska Koster	Netherlands	Uno-X Mobility	32	72	+ 1h 58' 11"	
176	Laura Tomasi	Italy	Uno-X Mobility	27	DNF-1	–	
177	Alessia Vigilia	Italy	Uno-X Mobility	26	105	+ 2h 38' 22"	
181	Sandrine Tas	Belgium	Lotto–Intermarché Ladies	30	90	+ 2h 18' 23"	
182	Dina Boels ‡	Belgium	Lotto–Intermarché Ladies	21	DNF-3	–	
183	Elisabeth Ebras ‡	Estonia	Lotto–Intermarché Ladies	22	DNF-2	–	
184	Romina Hinojosa ‡	Mexico	Lotto–Intermarché Ladies	23	113	+ 2h 53' 42"	
185	Marieke Meert	Belgium	Lotto–Intermarché Ladies	26	DNF-2	–	
186	Linda Riedmann ‡	Germany	Lotto–Intermarché Ladies	23	79	+ 2h 07' 55"	
187	Sterre Vervloet ‡	Belgium	Lotto–Intermarché Ladies	22	DNF-2	–	
191	Clémence Latimier ‡	France	Ma Petite Entreprise	22	37	+ 1h 15' 05"	
192	Noémie Abgrall	France	Ma Petite Entreprise	26	100	+ 2h 35' 11"	
193	Laura Asencio	France	Ma Petite Entreprise	28	32	+ 1h 02' 58"	
194	Alison Avoine	France	Ma Petite Entreprise	26	OTL-1	–	
195	Morgane Coston	France	Ma Petite Entreprise	35	DNF-9	–	
196	Célia Le Mouël	France	Ma Petite Entreprise	26	49	+ 1h 33' 07"	
197	Océane Mahé	France	Ma Petite Entreprise	24	45	+ 1h 28' 21"	
201	Karolina Perekitko	Poland	Mayenne Monbana My Pie	27	39	+ 1h 18' 23"	
202	Marine Allione	France	Mayenne Monbana My Pie	25	95	+ 2h 26' 02"	
203	Alice Coutinho	France	Mayenne Monbana My Pie	25	DNS-9	–	
204	Kiara Lylyk ‡	Canada	Mayenne Monbana My Pie	22	DNS-7	–	
205	Fiona Mangan	Ireland	Mayenne Monbana My Pie	30	91	+ 2h 21' 48"	
206	Natalie Quinn	United States	Mayenne Monbana My Pie	24	98	+ 2h 33' 03"	
207	Constance Valentin	France	Mayenne Monbana My Pie	28	107	+ 2h 39' 44"	

=== By team ===
(Netherlands) Visma–Lease a Bike (TVL)
No.	Rider	Pos.
1	Pauline Ferrand-Prévot (FRA)	DNS-8
2	Marion Bunel (FRA)	67
3	Femke de Vries (NED)	12
4	Daniek Hengeveld (NED)	78
5	Lieke Nooijen (NED)	53
6	Sarah Van Dam (CAN)	24
7	Marianne Vos (NED)	DNF-9
Directeur sportif: Rutger Tijssen, Jos van Emden

(France) FDJ United–Suez (TFS)
No.	Rider	Pos.
11	Demi Vollering (NED)	1
12	Juliette Berthet (FRA)	15
13	Célia Gery (FRA)	21
14	Franziska Koch (GER)	41
15	Amber Kraak (NED)	73
16	Marie Le Net (FRA)	96
17	Évita Muzic (FRA)	52
Directeur sportif: Nicolas Maire, Lars Boom

(Germany) Canyon//SRAM (CSR)
No.	Rider	Pos.
21	Katarzyna Niewiadoma-Phinney (POL)	2
22	Zoe Bäckstedt (GBR)	50
23	Chiara Consonni (ITA)	101
24	Rosa Klöser (GER)	43
25	Antonia Niedermaier (GER)	4
26	Soraya Paladin (ITA)	74
27	Agnieszka Skalniak-Sójka (POL)	55
Directeur sportif: Rolf Aldag, Adam Szabó

(United Arab Emirates) UAE Team L'Imad (UAD)
No.	Rider	Pos.
31	Dominika Włodarczyk (POL)	7
32	Paula Blasi (ESP)	5
33	Brodie Chapman (AUS)	DNS-2
34	Mavi García (ESP)	20
35	Elisa Longo Borghini (ITA)	3
36	Silvia Persico (ITA)	56
37	Maëva Squiban (FRA)	22
Directeur sportif: Cherie Pridham, Michele Devoti

(Netherlands) Team SD Worx–Protime (SDW)
No.	Rider	Pos.
41	Anna van der Breggen (NED)	DNS-7
42	Mischa Bredewold (NED)	46
43	Valentina Cavallar (AUT)	DNS-9
44	Elena Cecchini (ITA)	104
45	Lotte Kopecky (BEL)	40
46	Nienke Vinke (NED)	40
47	Lorena Wiebes (NED)	65
Directeur sportif: Christian Kos, Danny Stam

(Spain) Movistar Team (MOV)
No.	Rider	Pos.
51	Marlen Reusser (SUI)	14
52	Francesca Barale (ITA)	85
53	Ana Vitória Magalhães (BRA)	75
54	Liane Lippert (GER)	44
55	Sara Martín (ESP)	84
56	Paula Ostiz (ESP)	51
57	Arlenis Sierra (CUB)	99
Directeur sportif: Kelvin Dekker, Jorge Sanz

(Germany) Lidl–Trek (LTK)
No.	Rider	Pos.
61	Elisa Balsamo (ITA)	57
62	Loes Adegeest (NED)	60
63	Lucinda Brand (NED)	36
64	Niamh Fisher-Black (NZL)	10
65	Isabella Holmgren (CAN)	8
66	Riejanne Markus (NED)	27
67	Amanda Spratt (AUS)	30
Directeur sportif: Ina-Yoko Teutenberg, Dirk Baldinger

(Belgium) AG Insurance–Soudal (AGS)
No.	Rider	Pos.
71	Kimberley Le Court-Pienaar (MRI)	9
72	Mireia Benito (ESP)	42
73	Letizia Borghesi (ITA)	DNF-9
74	Shari Bossuyt (BEL)	86
75	Lore De Schepper (BEL)	62
76	Justine Ghekiere (BEL)	25
77	Urška Žigart (SVN)	48
Directeur sportif: Jolien D'Hoore, Fien Delbaere

(United States) EF Education–Oatly (EFO)
No.	Rider	Pos.
81	Magdeleine Vallieres (CAN)	18
82	Nina Berton (LUX)	68
83	Henrietta Christie (NZL)	82
84	Kristen Faulkner (USA)	26
85	Cédrine Kerbaol (FRA)	6
86	Noemi Rüegg (SUI)	17
87	Alice Towers (GBR)	61
Directeur sportif: Carmen Small, Huub Duyn

(Belgium) Fenix–Premier Tech (FPC)
No.	Rider	Pos.
91	Puck Pieterse (NED)	23
92	Sara Casasola (ITA)	33
93	Lotte Claes (BEL)	63
94	Millie Couzens (GBR)	77
95	Yara Kastelijn (NED)	DNF-6
96	Charlotte Kool (NED)	OTL-7
97	Christina Schweinberger (AUT)	DNS-2
Directeur sportif: Kris Wouters, Rik Van Slycke

(United States) Human Powered Health (HPH)
No.	Rider	Pos.
101	Titia Ryo (FRA)	47
102	Nina Buijsman (NED)	16
103	Carlotta Cipressi (ITA)	80
104	Thalita de Jong (NED)	13
105	Barbara Malcotti (ITA)	DNS-6
106	Marit Raaijmakers (NED)	89
107	Lily Williams (USA)	69
Directeur sportif: Magnus Bäckstedt, Clark Sheehan

(Australia) Liv AlUla Jayco (LIV)
No.	Rider	Pos.
111	Monica Trinca Colonel (ITA)	DNS-6
112	Mackenzie Coupland (AUS)	88
113	Nadia Gontova (CAN)	31
114	Jeanne Korevaar (NED)	59
115	Letizia Paternoster (ITA)	76
116	Ruby Roseman-Gannon (AUS)	87
117	Silke Smulders (NED)	64
Directeur sportif: Wim Stroetinga, Jessica Allen

(Netherlands) Team Picnic–PostNL (TPP)
No.	Rider	Pos.
121	Eleonora Ciabocco (ITA)	DNF-6
122	Robyn Clay (GBR)	114
123	Lucie Fityus (AUS)	112
124	Pfeiffer Georgi (GBR)	71
125	Mia Griffin (IRL)	115
126	Gaia Masetti (ITA)	38
127	Josie Nelson (GBR)	81
Directeur sportif: Callum Ferguson, Rudie Kemna

(France) St. Michel–Preference Home–Auber93 (AUB)
No.	Rider	Pos.
131	Émilie Morier (FRA)	19
132	Heidi Franz (USA)	DNS-9
133	Alicia González Blanco (ESP)	DNF-9
134	India Grangier (FRA)	DNF-5
135	Alison Jackson (CAN)	DNF-9
136	Solène Muller (FRA)	34
137	Caroline Wreszin (USA)	111
Directeur sportif: Tony Hurel, Léonard Cosnier

(France) Cofidis (CWT)
No.	Rider	Pos.
141	Malwina Mul (POL)	54
142	Julie Bego (FRA)	83
143	Ema Comte (FRA)	58
144	Amalie Dideriksen (DEN)	93
145	Victorie Guilman (FRA)	108
146	Hannah Ludwig (GER)	DNS-5
147	Nikola Nosková (CZE)	DNF-9
Directeur sportif: Gaëtan Lemoine, Arthur Quilliec

(Spain) Laboral Kutxa–Fundación Euskadi (LKF)
No.	Rider	Pos.
151	Usoa Ostolaza (ESP)	70
152	Naia Amondarain (ESP)	109
153	Yuliia Biriukova (UKR)	92
154	Idoia Eraso (ESP)	106
155	Arianna Fidanza (ITA)	102
156	Paula Patiño (COL)	DNS-9
157	Debora Silvestri (ITA)	29
Directeur sportif: Ion Lazkano, Peio Goikoetxea

(Netherlands) VolkerWessels Women Cyclingteam (VWT)
No.	Rider	Pos.
161	Quinty Schoens (NED)	66
162	Anneke Dijkstra (NED)	110
163	Malou Eisen (NED)	97
164	Eline Jansen (NED)	94
165	Laura Molenaar (NED)	DNF-2
166	Maud Rijnbeek (NED)	103
167	Sophie von Berswordt (NED)	DNF-9
Directeur sportif: Bart Faes, Marieke van Wanroij

(Norway) Uno-X Mobility (UXM)
No.	Rider	Pos.
171	Katrine Aalerud (NED)	DNS-7
172	Teuntje Beekhuis (NED)	DNS-5
173	Marte Berg Edseth (NOR)	67
174	Sigrid Ytterhus Haugset (NOR)	28
175	Anouska Koster (NED)	72
176	Laura Tomasi (ITA)	DNF-1
177	Alessia Vigilia (ITA)	105
Directeur sportif: Anna Badegruber, Martin Vestby

(Belgium) Lotto–Intermarché Ladies (LIL)
No.	Rider	Pos.
181	Sandrine Tas (BEL)	90
182	Dina Boels (BEL)	DNF-3
183	Elisabeth Ebras (EST)	DNF-2
184	Romina Hinojosa (MEX)	113
185	Marieke Meert (BEL)	DNF-2
186	Linda Riedmann (GER)	79
187	Sterre Vervloet (BEL)	DNF-2
Directeur sportif: Grace Verbeke, Zico Waeytens

(France) Ma Petite Entreprise (MPE)
No.	Rider	Pos.
191	Clémence Latimier (FRA)	37
192	Noémie Abgrall (FRA)	100
193	Laura Asencio (FRA)	32
194	Alison Avoine (FRA)	OTL-1
195	Morgane Coston (FRA)	DNF-9
196	Célia Le Mouël (FRA)	49
197	Océane Mahé (FRA)	45
Directeur sportif: Damien Baucheron, Gaël Le Bellec

(France) Mayenne Monbana My Pie (MMM)
No.	Rider	Pos.
201	Karolina Perekitko (POL)	39
202	Marine Allione (FRA)	95
203	Alice Coutinho (FRA)	DNS-9
204	Kiara Lylyk (CAN)	DNS-7
205	Fiona Mangan (IRL)	91
206	Natalie Quinn (USA)	98
207	Constance Valentin (FRA)	107
Directeur sportif: Franck Renimel, Jean-Christophe Barbotin

=== By nationality ===
Country	No. of riders	Finished	Stage wins
Australia	5	4	
Austria	2	0	
Belgium	9	6	
Brazil	1	1	
Canada	6	4	
Colombia	1	0	
Cuba	1	1	
Czechia	1	0	
Denmark	1	1	
Estonia	1	0	
France	25	20	
Germany	6	5	
Great Britain	6	6	
Ireland	2	2	
Italy	19	14	
Luxembourg	1	1	
Mauritius	1	1	1 (Kimberley Le Court-Pienaar)
Mexico	1	1	
Netherlands	30	23	5 (Demi Vollering x3, Lorena Wiebes x2)
New Zealand	2	2	
Norway	3	2	1 (Sigrid Ytterhus Haugset)
Poland	5	5	1 (Katarzyna Niewiadoma-Phinney)
Slovenia	1	1	
Spain	9	8	
Switzerland	2	2	1 (Marlen Reusser)
Ukraine	1	1	
United States	5	4	
Total	147	115	9
