= 2026 Tour de France Femmes, Stage 1 to Stage 9 =

The 2026 Tour de France Femmes (officially Tour de France Femmes avec Zwift) was the fifth edition of the Tour de France Femmes. The race took place from 1 to 9 August 2026.

== Overview ==
Stage characteristics
| Stage | Date | Course | Distance | Type | Winner |
|---|---|---|---|---|---|
| 1 | 1 August | Lausanne (Switzerland) to Lausanne (Switzerland) | 138 km (86 mi) | Flat stage | Lorena Wiebes (NED) |
| 2 | 2 August | Aigle (Switzerland) to Geneva (Switzerland) | 147.9 km (91.9 mi) | Flat stage | Lorena Wiebes (NED) |
| 3 | 3 August | Geneva (Switzerland) to Poligny | 156.5 km (97.2 mi) | Hilly stage | Sigrid Ytterhus Haugset (NOR) |
| 4 | 4 August | Gevrey-Chambertin to Dijon | 21 km (13 mi) | Individual time trial | Marlen Reusser (SUI) |
| 5 | 5 August | Mâcon to Belleville-en-Beaujolais | 140 km (87 mi) | Hilly stage | Demi Vollering (NED) |
| 6 | 6 August | Montbrison to Tournon-sur-Rhône | 153.4 km (95.3 mi) | Hilly stage | Kimberley Le Court-Pienaar (MRI) |
| 7 | 7 August | La Voulte-sur-Rhône to Mont Ventoux | 146.8 km (91.2 mi) | Mountain stage | Katarzyna Niewiadoma-Phinney (POL) |
| 8 | 8 August | Sisteron to Nice | 171.9 km (106.8 mi) | Flat stage | Demi Vollering (NED) |
| 9 | 9 August | Nice to Nice | 99.2 km (61.6 mi) | Mountain stage | Demi Vollering (NED) |
| Total | | | 1,174.7 km (729.9 mi) | | |

== Classification standings ==
Legend
| Denotes the leader of the General classification | Denotes the leader of the Mountains classification |
| Denotes the leader of the Points classification | Denotes the leader of the Young rider classification |
| Denotes the leader of the Team classification | Denotes the winner of the Combativity award |

== Stage 1 ==
1 August 2026 – Lausanne (Switzerland) to Lausanne (Switzerland), 138 km (86 mi)

The first stage of the race took place in Switzerland (the host of the Grand Départ), with a 137 km (85 mi) course that started and finished in Lausanne. The stage featured four categorised climbs, including the fourth-category Côte Saint-Francois climb to the finish in Lausanne (2.6 km with an average gradient of 4.6%).

On the stage, a four-rider breakaway was soon established, including Océane Mahé (Ma Petite Entreprise). They opened up a 4 minute gap to the peloton, with Alison Jackson (St. Michel–Preference Home–Auber93) attempting but failing to bridge across. Crashes occurred in the peloton, with Laura Tomasi (Uno-X Mobility) having to abandon the race after a crash with 80 km (50 mi) to go. At the intermediate sprint, Charlotte Kool (Fenix–Premier Tech) took the remaining points behind the breakaway. With 50 km (31 mi) remaining, the peloton picked up speed and the gap to the break fell on the climbs. On the descent to Lake Geneva, Marlen Reusser (Movistar Team) crashed after her teammate Arlenis Sierra overshot a corner. Both remounted their bike and chased back onto the peloton. With 20 km (12 mi) to the finish, the gap to the break fell to under a minute, and they were caught with 6 km (3.7 mi) to go as the race entered Lausanne.

On the Côte Saint-Francois climb to the finish, Kimberley Le Court-Pineaar (AG Insurance–Soudal) attacked on the steepest section, but was unable to escape. As the peloton rapidly reduced in size on the climb, several attacks were made, with Demi Vollering (FDJ United–Suez) attempting an attack with 750 m (2,460 ft) to go. However, Lorena Wiebes (Team SD Worx–Protime) had been able to follow the riders up the climb, and on the flat to the finish pushed on to take her sixth Tour stage win and second yellow jersey of her career.

Wiebes took the yellow jersey of the general classification (GC), with bonus seconds at the finish line giving her a lead of 4 seconds over Le Court-Pineaar and 6 seconds over Vollering. Wiebes also took the lead in the points classification with her stage win. Mahé took the polka dot jersey of the Queen of the Mountains (QoM) classification, following her day in the breakaway. Paula Blasi (UAE Team L'Imad) took the white jersey of the young rider classification, albeit with the same time as Isabella Holmgren (Lidl–Trek) and Antonia Niedermaier (Canyon//SRAM).

Stage 1 Result
| Rank | Rider | Team | Time |
|---|---|---|---|
| 1 | Lorena Wiebes (NED) | Team SD Worx–Protime | 3h 29' 11" |
| 2 | Kimberley Le Court-Pienaar (MRI) | AG Insurance–Soudal | + 0" |
| 3 | Demi Vollering (NED) | FDJ United–Suez | + 0" |
| 4 | Puck Pieterse (NED) | Fenix–Premier Tech | + 0" |
| 5 | Noemi Rüegg (SUI) | EF Education–Oatly | + 0" |
| 6 | Elisa Longo Borghini (ITA) | UAE Team L'Imad | + 0" |
| 7 | Katarzyna Niewiadoma-Phinney (POL) | Canyon//SRAM | + 0" |
| 8 | Pauline Ferrand-Prévot (FRA) | Visma–Lease a Bike | + 0" |
| 9 | Cédrine Kerbaol (FRA) | EF Education–Oatly | + 0" |
| 10 | Marlen Reusser (SUI) | Movistar Team | + 0" |

General classification after Stage 1
| Rank | Rider | Team | Time |
|---|---|---|---|
| 1 | Lorena Wiebes (NED) | Team SD Worx–Protime | 3h 29' 11" |
| 2 | Kimberley Le Court-Pienaar (MRI) | AG Insurance–Soudal | + 4" |
| 3 | Demi Vollering (NED) | FDJ United–Suez | + 6" |
| 4 | Puck Pieterse (NED) | Fenix–Premier Tech | + 10" |
| 5 | Noemi Rüegg (SUI) | EF Education–Oatly | + 10" |
| 6 | Elisa Longo Borghini (ITA) | UAE Team L'Imad | + 10" |
| 7 | Katarzyna Niewiadoma-Phinney (POL) | Canyon//SRAM | + 10" |
| 8 | Pauline Ferrand-Prévot (FRA) | Visma–Lease a Bike | + 10" |
| 9 | Cédrine Kerbaol (FRA) | EF Education–Oatly | + 10" |
| 10 | Marlen Reusser (SUI) | Movistar Team | + 10" |

== Stage 2 ==
2 August 2026 – Aigle (Switzerland) to Geneva (Switzerland), 147.9 km (91.9 mi)

The second stage of the race also took place in Switzerland, taking riders on a 149 km (93 mi) course from Aigle to Geneva. The stage featured five categorised climbs, including three at third-category.

It took some time for the breakaway to be established, with the peloton passing over the first two categorised climbs uneventfully. A five-rider break was established with 98 km (61 mi) to go in the stage. By the intermediate sprint, the gap was nearly 3 minutes, with Wiebes taking the remaining points following the breakaway. On the remaining climbs, the breakaway fell apart and the gap to the peloton fell to 40 seconds. Eight riders attempted another break, but were unable to pull away from the peloton.

With under 40 km (25 mi) remaining in the stage, Riejanne Markus (Lidl–Trek) bridged across to the remnants of the break, and built up a lead of around a minute. Behind Markus, there was some confusion in the peloton when Nienke Vinke (Team SD Worx–Protime) took a wrong turn while at the front. At 15 km (9.3 mi) to go, Markus had a lead of 40 seconds as the peloton gave chase. Markus limited her losses, with 30 seconds with 6 km (3.7 mi) to go. The peloton chased furiously, realising that Markus had the potential to make it to the line. Wiebes' teammate Lotte Kopecky (Team SD Worx–Protime) led the chase, with the gap falling to under 15 seconds and then to just five seconds at the flamme rouge with 1 km (0.62 mi) to go as Markus was caught. In the final sprint, no one could compete with the speed of Wiebes, who took her second stage win of the Tour.

There were no changes to the classifications, with Wiebes remaining in the yellow jersey of the GC, and extending her lead in the points classification to 81 points ahead of Le Court-Pineaar. Mahé and Blasi remained in the polka dot and white jerseys of the mountains and young rider classifications, respectively.

Stage 2 Result
| Rank | Rider | Team | Time |
|---|---|---|---|
| 1 | Lorena Wiebes (NED) | Team SD Worx–Protime | 3h 42' 08" |
| 2 | Elisa Balsamo (ITA) | Lidl–Trek | + 0" |
| 3 | Marianne Vos (NED) | Visma–Lease a Bike | + 0" |
| 4 | Shari Bossuyt (BEL) | AG Insurance–Soudal | + 0" |
| 5 | Letizia Paternoster (ITA) | Liv AlUla Jayco | + 0" |
| 6 | Josie Nelson (GBR) | Team Picnic–PostNL | + 0" |
| 7 | Zoe Bäckstedt (GBR) | Canyon//SRAM | + 0" |
| 8 | Noemi Rüegg (SUI) | EF Education–Oatly | + 0" |
| 9 | Malwina Mul (POL) | Cofidis | + 0" |
| 10 | Linda Riedmann (GER) | Lotto–Intermarché Ladies | + 0" |

General classification after Stage 2
| Rank | Rider | Team | Time |
|---|---|---|---|
| 1 | Lorena Wiebes (NED) | Team SD Worx–Protime | 7h 10' 59" |
| 2 | Kimberley Le Court-Pienaar (MRI) | AG Insurance–Soudal | + 14" |
| 3 | Demi Vollering (NED) | FDJ United–Suez | + 16" |
| 4 | Noemi Rüegg (SUI) | EF Education–Oatly | + 20" |
| 5 | Elisa Longo Borghini (ITA) | UAE Team L'Imad | + 20" |
| 6 | Cédrine Kerbaol (FRA) | EF Education–Oatly | + 20" |
| 7 | Katarzyna Niewiadoma-Phinney (POL) | Canyon//SRAM | + 20" |
| 8 | Puck Pieterse (NED) | Fenix–Premier Tech | + 20" |
| 9 | Pauline Ferrand-Prévot (FRA) | Visma–Lease a Bike | + 20" |
| 10 | Marlen Reusser (SUI) | Movistar Team | + 20" |

== Stage 3 ==
3 August 2026 – Geneva (Switzerland) to Poligny, 156.5 km (97.2 mi)

The third stage of the race took the riders northwards into France, with a hilly 157 km (98 mi) stage in the Jura Mountains from Geneva to Poligny. The stage featured four categorised climbs, including the first-category climb of the Col de la Faucille (11.4 km with an average gradient of 6.3%) after the start of the stage. The fourth-category climb of Côte de Chaux-Champagny – located 24 km (15 mi) from the finish – had bonus seconds available on the summit.

The stage started with the first-category climb of the Col de la Faucille, with several riders including Wiebes and Mahé dropped by the peloton. At the summit, Puck Pieterse (Fenix–Premier Tech) took maximum mountain points, before taking the lead in the mountains classification later in the stage after gaining further points on the Côte de Lajoux.

A breakaway group of 10 formed after the Col de la Faucille, having a gap of around 30 seconds with 110 km (68 mi) to go. Sigrid Ytterhus Haugset (Uno-X Mobility) attacked from the peloton, bridging the gap to the break and then attacking solo on the Col de la Savine. At the summit, Haugset had a 35 second lead over the peloton, who had caught the break. With 75 km (47 mi) remaining, Haugset had a lead of 90 seconds, as Kopecky attacked from the peloton to chase Haugset.

By the intermediate sprint with 55 km (34 mi) remaining, the gap from Haugset to the peloton was over 5 minutes, with Kopecky riding solo unable to reduce the gap to Haugset. On the final climb of Côte de Chaux-Champagny, Kopecky cut the gap to Haugset to around 30 seconds, with the peloton still nearly 4 minutes behind. GC contenders including Le Court-Pineaar and Katarzyna Niewiadoma-Phinney (Canyon//SRAM) attempted attacks on the climb, reducing the gap to Haugset to 2 minutes 20 seconds. Le Court-Pineaar took the remaining bonus seconds, as the GC group realised they would not catch Kopecky or Haugset before the finish.

In the run to the finish, Kopecky pushed on, reducing the gap to Haugset to 12 seconds with 11 km (6.8 mi) to go. However she suffered cramps in the heat, and was unable to catch Haugset before the line. Haugset therefore took the stage win by 1 minute 24 seconds over Kopecky, taking the yellow jersey thanks to her 88 km (55 mi) solo attack. A group of 38 riders including the GC contenders finished 2 minutes 48 seconds behind Haugset, with Marianne Vos (Visma–Lease a Bike) outsprinting Le Court-Pineaar to deny her the remaining bonus seconds on the line.

Haugset had a lead of 2 minutes 2 seconds on GC ahead of Le Court-Pineaar, with Vollering third overall 4 seconds further back. Wiebes remained in the green jersey of the points classification, with her lead cut to 56 points. Pieterse took the polka dot jersey of the mountains classification, with a lead of 4 points. Blasi remained in the lead of the young rider classification, with Holmgren and Niedermaier still equal on time.

Stage 3 Result
| Rank | Rider | Team | Time |
|---|---|---|---|
| 1 | Sigrid Ytterhus Haugset (NOR) | Uno-X Mobility | 4h 05' 59" |
| 2 | Lotte Kopecky (BEL) | Team SD Worx–Protime | + 1' 24" |
| 3 | Marianne Vos (NED) | Visma–Lease a Bike | + 2' 48" |
| 4 | Usoa Ostolaza (ESP) | Laboral Kutxa–Fundación Euskadi | + 2' 48" |
| 5 | Kimberley Le Court-Pienaar (MRI) | AG Insurance–Soudal | + 2' 48" |
| 6 | Noemi Rüegg (SUI) | EF Education–Oatly | + 2' 48" |
| 7 | Célia Gery (FRA) | FDJ United–Suez | + 2' 48" |
| 8 | Cédrine Kerbaol (FRA) | EF Education–Oatly | + 2' 48" |
| 9 | Malwina Mul (POL) | Cofidis | + 2' 48" |
| 10 | Monica Trinca Colonel (ITA) | Liv AlUla Jayco | + 2' 48" |

General classification after Stage 3
| Rank | Rider | Team | Time |
|---|---|---|---|
| 1 | Sigrid Ytterhus Haugset (NOR) | Uno-X Mobility | 11h 17' 56" |
| 2 | Kimberley Le Court-Pienaar (MRI) | AG Insurance–Soudal | + 2' 02" |
| 3 | Demi Vollering (NED) | FDJ United–Suez | + 2' 06" |
| 4 | Noemi Rüegg (SUI) | EF Education–Oatly | + 2' 10" |
| 5 | Marianne Vos (NED) | Visma–Lease a Bike | + 2' 10" |
| 6 | Cédrine Kerbaol (FRA) | EF Education–Oatly | + 2' 10" |
| 7 | Elisa Longo Borghini (ITA) | UAE Team L'Imad | + 2' 10" |
| 8 | Katarzyna Niewiadoma-Phinney (POL) | Canyon//SRAM | + 2' 10" |
| 9 | Puck Pieterse (NED) | Fenix–Premier Tech | + 2' 10" |
| 10 | Pauline Ferrand-Prévot (FRA) | Visma–Lease a Bike | + 2' 10" |

== Stage 4 ==
4 August 2026 – Gevrey-Chambertin to Dijon, 21 km (13 mi) (ITT)

The fourth stage of the race was an individual time trial from Gevrey-Chambertin to Dijon, over a 21 km (13 mi) course. Before the halfway point, the course featured a steep climb – Lacets de Marsannay (1.8 km with an average gradient of 6.9%).

Lotte Claes (Fenix–Premier Tech) was the first rider to set a time under 28 min 30 s, before Lieke Nooijen (Visma–Lease a Bike) beat her time by 51 seconds after a fast descent. One of the favourites for the time trial – Zoe Bäckstedt (Canyon//SRAM) – set similar times to Nooijen on the first half of the course, but lost time on the descent, finishing 16 seconds slower.

GC contenders then tackled the course, with both Blasi and Anna van der Breggen (Team SD Worx–Protime) setting times over a minute behind Nooijen. Time trial specialist Reusser was initially 20 seconds faster than Nooijen at the intermediate split, but lost time on the descent. Despite this, Reusser beat Nooijen by 4 seconds, setting a time of 27 min 30 s. Pauline Ferrand-Prévot (Visma–Lease a Bike) set a time 2 min 13 s slower than Reusser, with French media calling the performance "catastrophic".

Acknowledging that the time trial wasn't their speciality, Niewiadoma-Phinney nevertheless set a time 1 min 9 s slower than Reusser to secure 6th overall. Elisa Longo Borghini (UAE Team L'Imad) was on track to set a fast time, but had a mechanical and needed to change her bike – eventually finishing 1 min 3 s slower than Reusser, placing 5th overall. Both Cédrine Kerbaol (EF Education–Oatly) and Vollering gained time on the descent, finishing 18 seconds and 54 seconds behind Reusser respectively. Riding last on the stage as the yellow jersey holder, Haugset set a time over 3 minutes slower than Reusser, losing her lead and falling to 4th overall.

Reusser therefore took the lead in GC, with Vollering in 2nd place overall 14 seconds behind and Kerbaol 3rd overall, 54 s behind. Ferrand-Prévot was the biggest GC contender to lose time, falling to 14th overall, 2 min 13 seconds behind Reusser. Reusser was delighted with her win and the yellow jersey, calling it "Project Dijon" and expressing desire to win the Tour. Wiebes and Pieterse remained in the green and polka dot jerseys of the points and mountains classifications, and Blasi's performance gave her a 31 second lead in the young rider classification ahead of Niedermaier.

Stage 4 Result
| Rank | Rider | Team | Time |
|---|---|---|---|
| 1 | Marlen Reusser (SUI) | Movistar Team | 27' 30" |
| 2 | Lieke Nooijen (NED) | Visma–Lease a Bike | + 4" |
| 3 | Demi Vollering (NED) | FDJ United–Suez | + 18" |
| 4 | Zoe Bäckstedt (GBR) | Canyon//SRAM | + 20" |
| 5 | Mischa Bredewold (NED) | Team SD Worx–Protime | + 45" |
| 6 | Kristen Faulkner (USA) | EF Education–Oatly | + 54" |
| 7 | Cédrine Kerbaol (FRA) | EF Education–Oatly | + 54" |
| 8 | Lotte Claes (BEL) | Fenix–Premier Tech | + 55" |
| 9 | Riejanne Markus (NED) | Lidl–Trek | + 1' 01" |
| 10 | Elisa Longo Borghini (ITA) | UAE Team L'Imad | + 1' 03" |

General classification after Stage 4
| Rank | Rider | Team | Time |
|---|---|---|---|
| 1 | Marlen Reusser (SUI) | Movistar Team | 11h 47' 36" |
| 2 | Demi Vollering (NED) | FDJ United–Suez | + 14" |
| 3 | Cédrine Kerbaol (FRA) | EF Education–Oatly | + 54" |
| 4 | Sigrid Ytterhus Haugset (NOR) | Uno-X Mobility | + 56" |
| 5 | Elisa Longo Borghini (ITA) | UAE Team L'Imad | + 1' 03" |
| 6 | Katarzyna Niewiadoma-Phinney (POL) | Canyon//SRAM | + 1' 09" |
| 7 | Paula Blasi (ESP) | UAE Team L'Imad | + 1' 12" |
| 8 | Anna van der Breggen (NED) | Team SD Worx–Protime | + 1' 17" |
| 9 | Antonia Niedermaier (GER) | Canyon//SRAM | + 1' 43" |
| 10 | Femke de Vries (NED) | Visma–Lease a Bike | + 1' 47" |

== Stage 5 ==
5 August 2026 – Mâcon to Belleville-en-Beaujolais, 140 km (87 mi)

The fifth stage of the race headed south from Mâcon to Belleville-en-Beaujolais, with a hilly 140 km (87 mi) route in the Massif Central. The stage featured eight categorised climbs (including three at second-category) with a total of 2,850 m (9,350 ft) of elevation gain. The second-category climb of Mont Brouilly (3 km with an average gradient of 7.7%) was located around 10 km (6.2 mi) from the finish. Bonus seconds were available at the base of the climb.

Pieterse took the mountain points over the first 3 climbs as the peloton stayed together despite attempts at a breakaway. Wiebes took the remaining points at the intermediate sprint behind a solo break attempt by Carlotta Cipressi (Human Powered Health). Pieterse again took the mountain points at the summit of the next climb after the peloton reformed, before joining the 19-rider break that formed on the descent, with several riders who hoped for a breakaway victory.

On the next two climbs, Pieterse again took the mountain points to consolidate her lead in the classification as the gap from the peloton to the break grew to nearly 2 minutes with 50 km (31 mi) remaining in the stage. FDJ United–Suez then increased the pace, with Évita Muzic and Célia Gery working to cut the gap to the breakaway. On the third-category Col de Durbize climb, the peloton began to fell apart as Vollering put in several accelerations. With 30 km (19 mi) remaining, Vollering attacked again on the steepest section of the climb, with Ferrand-Prévot, van der Breggen, Longo Borghini, Blasi and Kerbaol all dropped.

Vollering then used her FDJ United–Suez teammates Franziska Koch and Juliette Berthet from the disintegrating breakaway to pull away from the dropped GC contenders. On the final climb of Mont Brouilly, Vollering overtook the remainder of the breakaway, before attacking again with 10 km (6.2 mi) to go, with only Reusser and Niewiadoma-Phinney able to follow. In the sprint finish, Niewiadoma-Phinney attempted a long attack with 400 m (1,300 ft) to go, but Vollering caught her before the line to take her first stage win of the Tour. Vollering therefore cut Reusser's GC lead to 12 seconds, with Niewiadoma-Phinney moving into 3rd overall, 1 min 17 s behind Reusser.

Wiebes maintained the green jersey of the points competition with a 63 point lead, Pieterse remained in the polka dot jersey of the mountains classification with a 23 point lead, and Niedermaier moved into the lead of the young rider classification after Blasi lost nearly 3 and a half minutes. After the stage, Ferrand-Prévot admitted that her chances of defending her title were "over" and that "my rivals are clearly superior", with a gap of over 5 minutes between herself and Reusser.

Stage 5 Result
| Rank | Rider | Team | Time |
|---|---|---|---|
| 1 | Demi Vollering (NED) | FDJ United–Suez | 3h 53' 54" |
| 2 | Marlen Reusser (SUI) | Movistar Team | + 0" |
| 3 | Katarzyna Niewiadoma-Phinney (POL) | Canyon//SRAM | + 0" |
| 4 | Dominika Włodarczyk (POL) | UAE Team L'Imad | + 20" |
| 5 | Isabella Holmgren (CAN) | Lidl–Trek | + 45" |
| 6 | Antonia Niedermaier (GER) | Canyon//SRAM | + 45" |
| 7 | Nienke Vinke (NED) | Team SD Worx–Protime | + 1' 12" |
| 8 | Femke de Vries (NED) | Visma–Lease a Bike | + 1' 12" |
| 9 | Thalita de Jong (NED) | Human Powered Health | + 1' 12" |
| 10 | Niamh Fisher-Black (NZL) | Lidl–Trek | + 1' 15" |

General classification after Stage 5
| Rank | Rider | Team | Time |
|---|---|---|---|
| 1 | Marlen Reusser (SUI) | Movistar Team | 15h 41' 18" |
| 2 | Demi Vollering (NED) | FDJ United–Suez | + 12" |
| 3 | Katarzyna Niewiadoma-Phinney (POL) | Canyon//SRAM | + 1' 17" |
| 4 | Antonia Niedermaier (GER) | Canyon//SRAM | + 2' 40" |
| 5 | Dominika Włodarczyk (POL) | UAE Team L'Imad | + 2' 54" |
| 6 | Elisa Longo Borghini (ITA) | UAE Team L'Imad | + 2' 58" |
| 7 | Isabella Holmgren (CAN) | Lidl–Trek | + 3' 05" |
| 8 | Femke de Vries (NED) | Visma–Lease a Bike | + 3' 11" |
| 9 | Cédrine Kerbaol (FRA) | EF Education–Oatly | + 3 '41" |
| 10 | Paula Blasi (ESP) | UAE Team L'Imad | + 3' 51" |

== Stage 6 ==
6 August 2026 – Montbrison to Tournon-sur-Rhône, 153.4 km (95.3 mi)

The sixth stage of the race continued south, heading from Montbrison to Tournon-sur-Rhône over a hilly 153 km (95 mi) route in the Massif Central. The stage featured six categorised climbs, including one at second-category. Bonus seconds were available with 9 km (5.6 mi) remaining, prior to the descent to the finish line.

A breakaway formed after 25 km (16 mi), with Nikola Nosková (Cofidis) taking mountains points on the next three climbs as the break built a lead around 2 minutes. The break were then caught on the penultimate climb of the day – the second-category Col de Lalouvesc – before Gery attacked on the descent with 34 km (21 mi) to go. A strong group of riders including Longo Borghini, Pieterse and Kerbaol broke from the peloton to chase Gery, becoming a group of six with 30 km (19 mi) to go. Onto the last climb of the day, the group had a 30 second lead over a reduced peloton containing GC contenders. Pieterse then took the mountain points at the top of the climb, extending her lead in the mountains classification to 26 points.

After the climb, Le Court-Pienaar and Markus attacked from the peloton on a false flat and joined the group of six, with Le Court-Pienaar taking the bonus seconds with 9 km (5.6 mi) before the descent to the finish. With 5 km (3.1 mi) remaining, it was clear that the GC contenders were unwilling to chase and the group would contest the stage win. Multiple attacks then occurred in the final kilometres however the group reformed over and over again. In the sprint finish, Le Court-Pienaar attacked with 300 m (980 ft) to go, taking her second career stage win at the Tour, and moving into 9th overall on GC. After finishing with the group of eight, Longo Borghini moved into 4th overall, albeit nearly two and a half minutes behind Reusser. GC contenders finished the stage 28 seconds behind the group. Reacting to her win, Le Court-Piennar stated that "winning a stage in a Tour de France is very special. People don’t really remember top 10 or top five riders in Tour, but they do remember stage winners".

Stage 6 Result
| Rank | Rider | Team | Time |
|---|---|---|---|
| 1 | Kimberley Le Court-Pienaar (MRI) | AG Insurance–Soudal | 4h 01' 48" |
| 2 | Cédrine Kerbaol (FRA) | EF Education–Oatly | + 0" |
| 3 | Puck Pieterse (NED) | Fenix–Premier Tech | + 0" |
| 4 | Sarah Van Dam (CAN) | Visma–Lease a Bike | + 0" |
| 5 | Célia Gery (FRA) | FDJ United–Suez | + 0" |
| 6 | Liane Lippert (GER) | Movistar Team | + 0" |
| 7 | Elisa Longo Borghini (ITA) | UAE Team L'Imad | + 2" |
| 8 | Riejanne Markus (NED) | Lidl–Trek | + 5" |
| 9 | Dominika Włodarczyk (POL) | UAE Team L'Imad | + 28" |
| 10 | Noemi Rüegg (SUI) | EF Education–Oatly | + 28" |

General classification after Stage 6
| Rank | Rider | Team | Time |
|---|---|---|---|
| 1 | Marlen Reusser (SUI) | Movistar Team | 19h 43' 34" |
| 2 | Demi Vollering (NED) | FDJ United–Suez | + 12" |
| 3 | Katarzyna Niewiadoma-Phinney (POL) | Canyon//SRAM | + 1' 17" |
| 4 | Elisa Longo Borghini (ITA) | UAE Team L'Imad | + 2' 28" |
| 5 | Antonia Niedermaier (GER) | Canyon//SRAM | + 2' 40" |
| 6 | Dominika Włodarczyk (POL) | UAE Team L'Imad | + 2' 54" |
| 7 | Isabella Holmgren (CAN) | Lidl–Trek | + 3' 05" |
| 8 | Cédrine Kerbaol (FRA) | EF Education–Oatly | + 3' 07" |
| 9 | Kimberley Le Court-Pienaar (MRI) | AG Insurance–Soudal | + 3' 26" |
| 10 | Paula Blasi (ESP) | UAE Team L'Imad | + 3' 51" |

== Stage 7 ==
7 August 2026 – La Voulte-sur-Rhône to Mont Ventoux, 146.8 km (91.2 mi)

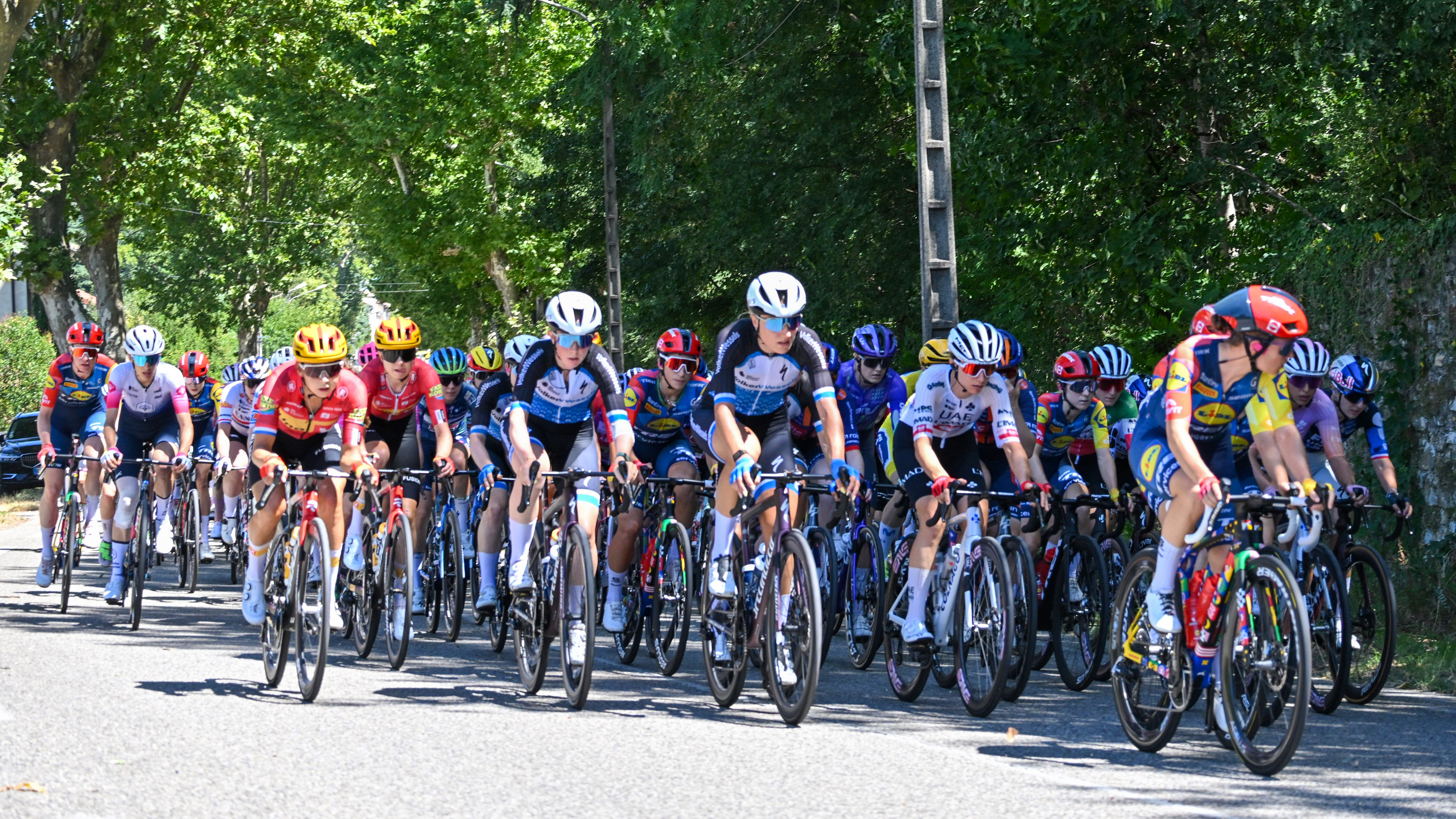
Peloton prior to the start of the stage

Considered to be the queen stage of the race, stage seven took riders 144 km (89 mi) from La Voulte-sur-Rhône to a summit finish at Mont Ventoux at an elevation of 1,910 m (6,270 ft). The hors catégorie climb of Mont Ventoux is 15.7 km in length with an average gradient of 8.8%. The stage had a total of 3,565 m (11,696 ft) of elevation gain, with three other climbs featuring on the route. Mont Ventoux had previously been tackled by the women's professional peloton at the 2006 Grande Boucle Féminine Internationale, 2022 Mont Ventoux Dénivelé Challenge and the 2016 Tour Cycliste Féminin International de l'Ardèche.

Prior to the start of the stage, van der Breggen abandoned the race, after losing 13 minutes on stage 6. Pieterse took the mountain points at the first two climbs, extending her lead to 34 points and securing victory in the mountains classification if she finished the Tour. A break of 11 riders formed after 70 km (43 mi), building a gap of around 90 seconds. On the second-category climb of Col de Suzette, the peloton reduced the gap to the breakaway as riders fell off and were caught.

As the hors catégorie climb of Mont Ventoux began with 15.7 km (9.8 mi) to go in the stage, FDJ United–Suez set a fast pace led by Gery, Berthet and Koch. Le Court-Pienaar and Ferrand-Prévot were dropped, as the GC group reduced to just 14 riders. Several attacks were attempted, with just 9 riders remaining at the front with 11.2 km (7.0 mi). Vollering attacked, with Reusser and Niewiadoma-Phinney following her. Niedermaier, Blasi, Longo Borghini and Kerbaol formed a chase group behind them, around 20 seconds behind the trio with 10 km (6.2 mi) to go.

Niewiadoma-Phinney then attacked with just less than 10 km (6.2 mi) to the summit, quickly pulling out a 10 second lead. By Chalet Reynard, she had pulled out a lead of a minute ahead of Vollering and Reusser, with the chase group another 20 seconds behind. Niewiadoma-Phinney continued to increase her advantage as Vollering and Reusser did not work together to chase. Passing the flamme rouge, she had a lead of nearly 2 minutes and was able to celebrate her first stage win at the Tour. Vollering then attacked Reusser in the final 600m, quickly pulling at an advantage of 30 seconds as she finished 1 min 16 s behind Niewiadoma-Phinney. Longo Borghini finished third, 26 second further back and Reusser was fourth, another 4 seconds back. Niedermaier extended her lead in the young rider classification to over a minute ahead of Blasi.

Owing to her stage win, Niewiadoma-Phinney took the yellow jersey with a lead of 15 seconds ahead of Vollering, with Reusser falling to third overall, 24 seconds further back. Niewiadoma-Phinney was delighted with her win, stating that "it means the world to me to get the yellow jersey by winning on the Ventoux". Looking forward to the final 2 stages, she expected "a massive fight for everything – points, bonus seconds, everything – because the gap is so small".

Stage 7 Result
| Rank | Rider | Team | Time |
|---|---|---|---|
| 1 | Katarzyna Niewiadoma-Phinney (POL) | Canyon//SRAM | 4h 22' 53" |
| 2 | Demi Vollering (NED) | FDJ United–Suez | + 1' 16" |
| 3 | Elisa Longo Borghini (ITA) | UAE Team L'Imad | + 1' 42" |
| 4 | Marlen Reusser (SUI) | Movistar Team | + 1' 46" |
| 5 | Paula Blasi (ESP) | UAE Team L'Imad | + 1' 48" |
| 6 | Antonia Niedermaier (GER) | Canyon//SRAM | + 1' 48" |
| 7 | Cédrine Kerbaol (FRA) | EF Education–Oatly | + 2' 01" |
| 8 | Dominika Włodarczyk (POL) | UAE Team L'Imad | + 3' 26" |
| 9 | Kimberley Le Court-Pienaar (MRI) | AG Insurance–Soudal | + 3' 58" |
| 10 | Isabella Holmgren (CAN) | Lidl–Trek | + 4' 11" |

General classification after Stage 7
| Rank | Rider | Team | Time |
|---|---|---|---|
| 1 | Katarzyna Niewiadoma-Phinney (POL) | Canyon//SRAM | 24h 07' 34" |
| 2 | Demi Vollering (NED) | FDJ United–Suez | + 15" |
| 3 | Marlen Reusser (SUI) | Movistar Team | + 39" |
| 4 | Elisa Longo Borghini (ITA) | UAE Team L'Imad | + 2' 59" |
| 5 | Antonia Niedermaier (GER) | Canyon//SRAM | + 3' 21" |
| 6 | Cédrine Kerbaol (FRA) | EF Education–Oatly | + 4' 01" |
| 7 | Paula Blasi (ESP) | UAE Team L'Imad | + 4' 32" |
| 8 | Dominika Włodarczyk (POL) | UAE Team L'Imad | + 5' 13" |
| 9 | Isabella Holmgren (CAN) | Lidl–Trek | + 6' 09" |
| 10 | Kimberley Le Court-Pienaar (MRI) | AG Insurance–Soudal | + 6' 17" |

== Stage 8 ==
8 August 2026 – Sisteron to Nice, 171.9 km (106.8 mi)

The longest stage of the race at 171.9 km (106.8 mi), the eighth stage from Sisteron to Nice was a transition stage exiting the French Alps. Four categorised climbs featured on the route, with the fourth-category climbs of Côte de Colomars (1.4 km with an average gradient of 5.4%) and Côte de la Ginestière (2.5 km with an average gradient of 4.4%) located in the final 20 km (12 mi) of the stage. The stage finish was on the Promenade des Anglais in Nice.

Prior to the start of the stage, Ferrand-Prévot abandoned the race due to illness. A two-rider breakaway of Maëva Squiban (UAE Team L'Imad) and Loes Adegeest (Lidl–Trek) hoped to escape to the finish and take the stage win, having a 5 minute gap with 50 km (31 mi) to go. On the Côte de Colomars, Zoe Bäckstedt (Canyon//SRAM) set a high pace to reduce the gap to the break to around a minute. However on the descent, Squiban crashed heavily with around 15 km (9.3 mi) to go.

On the final climb 7.7 km (4.8 mi) before the finish, FDJ United–Suez set a fast pace at the front of the peloton, catching Adegeest. Vollering then attacked on the steep slopes, opening a small gap ahead of her GC contenders. Niewiadoma-Phinney and Longo Borghini quickly gave chase. With 6 km (3.7 mi) from the top of the climb to the finish line, Vollering pushed on, taking her second stage win of the Tour by 17 seconds and taking the yellow jersey by 8 seconds.

Following the stage, Niewiadoma-Phinney criticised FDJ United–Suez, stating that "Gery, on purpose, just blocked me to the barriers" at the start of the final climb. Despite appeals to the race commissaires by Canyon//SRAM, no action was taken against Gery or FDJ United–Suez. Vollering looked forward to the final stage, stating "tomorrow I start in yellow and I will do everything in my power to keep it".

Stage 8 Result
| Rank | Rider | Team | Time |
|---|---|---|---|
| 1 | Demi Vollering (NED) | FDJ United–Suez | 4h 02' 39" |
| 2 | Elisa Longo Borghini (ITA) | UAE Team L'Imad | + 17" |
| 3 | Katarzyna Niewiadoma-Phinney (POL) | Canyon//SRAM | + 17" |
| 4 | Kimberley Le Court-Pienaar (MRI) | AG Insurance–Soudal | + 38" |
| 5 | Lotte Kopecky (BEL) | Team SD Worx–Protime | + 38" |
| 6 | Dominika Włodarczyk (POL) | UAE Team L'Imad | + 38" |
| 7 | Sarah Van Dam (CAN) | Visma–Lease a Bike | + 38" |
| 8 | Noemi Rüegg (SUI) | EF Education–Oatly | + 38" |
| 9 | Paula Blasi (ESP) | UAE Team L'Imad | + 38" |
| 10 | Cédrine Kerbaol (FRA) | EF Education–Oatly | + 38" |

General classification after Stage 8
| Rank | Rider | Team | Time |
|---|---|---|---|
| 1 | Demi Vollering (NED) | FDJ United–Suez | 28h 10' 18" |
| 2 | Katarzyna Niewiadoma-Phinney (POL) | Canyon//SRAM | + 8" |
| 3 | Marlen Reusser (SUI) | Movistar Team | + 1' 12" |
| 4 | Elisa Longo Borghini (ITA) | UAE Team L'Imad | + 3' 05" |
| 5 | Antonia Niedermaier (GER) | Canyon//SRAM | + 3' 54" |
| 6 | Cédrine Kerbaol (FRA) | EF Education–Oatly | + 4' 34" |
| 7 | Paula Blasi (ESP) | UAE Team L'Imad | + 5' 05" |
| 8 | Dominika Włodarczyk (POL) | UAE Team L'Imad | + 5' 46" |
| 9 | Kimberley Le Court-Pienaar (MRI) | AG Insurance–Soudal | + 6' 50" |
| 10 | Isabella Holmgren (CAN) | Lidl–Trek | + 7' 54" |

== Stage 9 ==
9 August 2026 – Nice to Nice, 99.2 km (61.6 mi)

The final stage of the race started and finished in Nice, with a 99 km (62 mi) circuit that tackled the Col d'Èze four times. The first three ascents of the Col d'Èze (7.7 km with an average gradient of 5.9%) were ranked as second-category climbs. On the final lap, a shorter and steeper ascent of the Col d'Èze via the Chemin des Vinaigriers (6 km with an average gradient of 7.6%) was tackled (ranked as a first-category climb), before a descent to the finish on the Promenade des Anglais in Nice.

Several attacks occurred on the first lap, to no avail. Wiebes won the intermediate sprint, securing her green jersey of the points classification. On the second time up the Col d'Èze, Backstedt rode strongly to reduce the group to just 11 riders, with Cycling News calling her performance "a climbing time trial". On the descent, Reusser crashed heavily and took several minutes to remount her bike, eventually continuing to ride – albeit with the gruppetto. On the third lap, Holmgren attacked, establishing a minute lead at the top of the climb. On the final lap, Holmgren had a 30 second advantage going into the steeper ascent of the Col d'Èze. She was caught, as Niewiadoma-Phinney and Vollering then attempted attacks to escape solo. The pair then led the race ahead of a GC group including Longo Borghini, Niedermaier and Blasi.

With 800 m (2,600 ft) to the top of the Col d'Èze, Vollering attacked decisively and Niewiadoma-Phinney was unable to follow. Summitting the climb in the lead, Vollering then rode down the 15 km (9.3 mi) descent to the finish at pace – crossing the finishing line on the Promenade des Anglais 1 min 4 s ahead of Niewiadoma-Phinney, taking her second Tour de France Femmes victory. Longo Borghini finished 1 min 14 s behind Vollering, taking 3rd overall from Reusser – who finished 24 minutes behind Vollering and fell to 14th overall following her crash. Wiebes, Pieterse, Niedermaier all finished the stage safely to confirm their classification victories.

Stage 9 Result
| Rank | Rider | Team | Time |
|---|---|---|---|
| 1 | Demi Vollering (NED) | FDJ United–Suez | 2h 44' 43" |
| 2 | Paula Blasi (ESP) | UAE Team L'Imad | + 1' 04" |
| 3 | Katarzyna Niewiadoma-Phinney (POL) | Canyon//SRAM | + 1' 04" |
| 4 | Niamh Fisher-Black (NZL) | Lidl–Trek | + 1'04" |
| 5 | Antonia Niedermaier (GER) | Canyon//SRAM | + 1' 06" |
| 6 | Isabella Holmgren (CAN) | Lidl–Trek | + 1' 08" |
| 7 | Elisa Longo Borghini (ITA) | UAE Team L'Imad | + 1' 04" |
| 8 | Femke de Vries (NED) | Visma–Lease a Bike | + 1' 57" |
| 9 | Dominika Włodarczyk (POL) | UAE Team L'Imad | + 1' 57" |
| 10 | Cédrine Kerbaol (FRA) | EF Education–Oatly | + 1' 57" |

Final general classification
| Rank | Rider | Team | Time |
|---|---|---|---|
| 1 | Demi Vollering (NED) | FDJ United–Suez | 30h 54' 51" |
| 2 | Katarzyna Niewiadoma-Phinney (POL) | Canyon//SRAM | + 1' 18" |
| 3 | Elisa Longo Borghini (ITA) | UAE Team L'Imad | + 4' 19" |
| 4 | Antonia Niedermaier (GER) | Canyon//SRAM | + 5' 10" |
| 5 | Paula Blasi (ESP) | UAE Team L'Imad | + 6' 13" |
| 6 | Cédrine Kerbaol (FRA) | EF Education–Oatly | + 6' 41" |
| 7 | Dominika Włodarczyk (POL) | UAE Team L'Imad | + 7' 53" |
| 8 | Isabella Holmgren (CAN) | Lidl–Trek | + 9' 12" |
| 9 | Kimberley Le Court-Pienaar (MRI) | AG Insurance–Soudal | + 14' 04" |
| 10 | Niamh Fisher-Black (NZL) | Lidl–Trek | + 15' 14" |
