= Robyn Clay =

British cyclist (born 2003)

Personal information
- Born: 13 October 2003 (age 23)

Cycling career
- Sport: Cycling
- Current team: Team Picnic–PostNL
- Discipline: Road
- Role: Rider

Robyn Clay (born 13 October 2003) is a is an English professional racing cyclist, who currently rides for UCI Women's WorldTeam Team Picnic–PostNL.

== Early and personal life ==
She is from Leeds in West Yorkshire. Her father Jon Clay was a successful cyclist, winner of a silver medal in the individual pursuit at the 1998 Commonwealth Games and a bronze medallist at the 2000 Olympic Games in the team pursuit, and her mother is former elite rider Danielle Davis.

== Career ==
Clay rode as a member of Otley Cycle Club prior to joining the Pro-Noctis Heidi Kjeldsen 200 Degrees Coffee road team for the 2023 season. She won the Lincoln Grand Prix in May 2023.

After recovering from an Achilles injury and a broken collarbone, Clay had her first UCI win at the Tour de Feminin in Czechia riding for DAS–Hutchinson in 2025, and rode for the team at the 2025 Tour of Britain Women.

In June 2025, she finished runner-up in the women's U23 race at the British National Time Trial Championships to Millie Couzens. She recorded five race wins in 2025, including both the National Road and National Circuit Series, and the inaugural Rapha Super-League. At the conclusion of the 2025 season she signed for UCI Women's WorldTeam Team Picnic–PostNL.

Clay was picked as part of a seven rider team to ride the 2026 Tour de France Femmes avec Zwift.
