= Cherie Pridham =

English sports manager

Cherie Pridham (born May 22, 1971) is the sports director for the Lotto-Soudal (also known as Lotto Dstny) cycling team. She is the first woman, on the men's world cycling tour to hold that role, and the first woman to achieve a World Tour victory at Tirreno-Adriatico in March 2021.

== Career ==
Pridham started bike racing in South Africa and rode her first Tour de l'Aude Cycliste Féminin when she was 19 years old. Her pro cycling career spanned eight Tours de l'Aude Cycliste Féminin and two Giri d'Italia Femminile (formerly known as the Giro Rosa), until her professional racing career was cut short due to injuries sustained from a hit and run accident in 2006.

In 2006, Pridham began managing professional cycling teams by joining a junior development team called the Merlin Development Squad. This squad became a Senior squad in 2007, in 2008 the team became Pearl Izumi- Planet X-High 5. In 2009, Cherie took charge of the Plowman Craven Race Team. In September 2010, she was approached by Raleigh UK to take on managing that team. As owner of Cherie Pridham Racing, she is also the longest serving UCI Continental level team manager, and the only female manager, in the UK. In 2018, Team Raleigh changed its name to Vitus Pro Cycling Team. On November 19, 2020 the Vitus Pro Cycling p/b Brother UK team announced that they will be closing down their men's racing team due to uncertain economic climate and a difficult sponsorship environment.

After a brief stoppage of world tour racing due to the global COVID-19 pandemic, professional cycling restarted and Pridham and her ISN team participated in the Tirreno-Adriatico UCI World Tour race that was held March 10–16, 2021 in Italy, with Mads Würtz Schmidt winning the 6th stage.

On October 07, 2021, Pridham joined the Lotto-Soudal cycling team as sports director, beginning with the 2022 season. She acted as sports director for her first Grand Tour at the 2022 Giro d'Italia.

== Awards ==
2019: Women's Participation in Sport award, Derby Telegraph Sports
