= Col d'Èze =

Mountain pass in France

Coordinates: 43°44′02″N 7°20′48″E

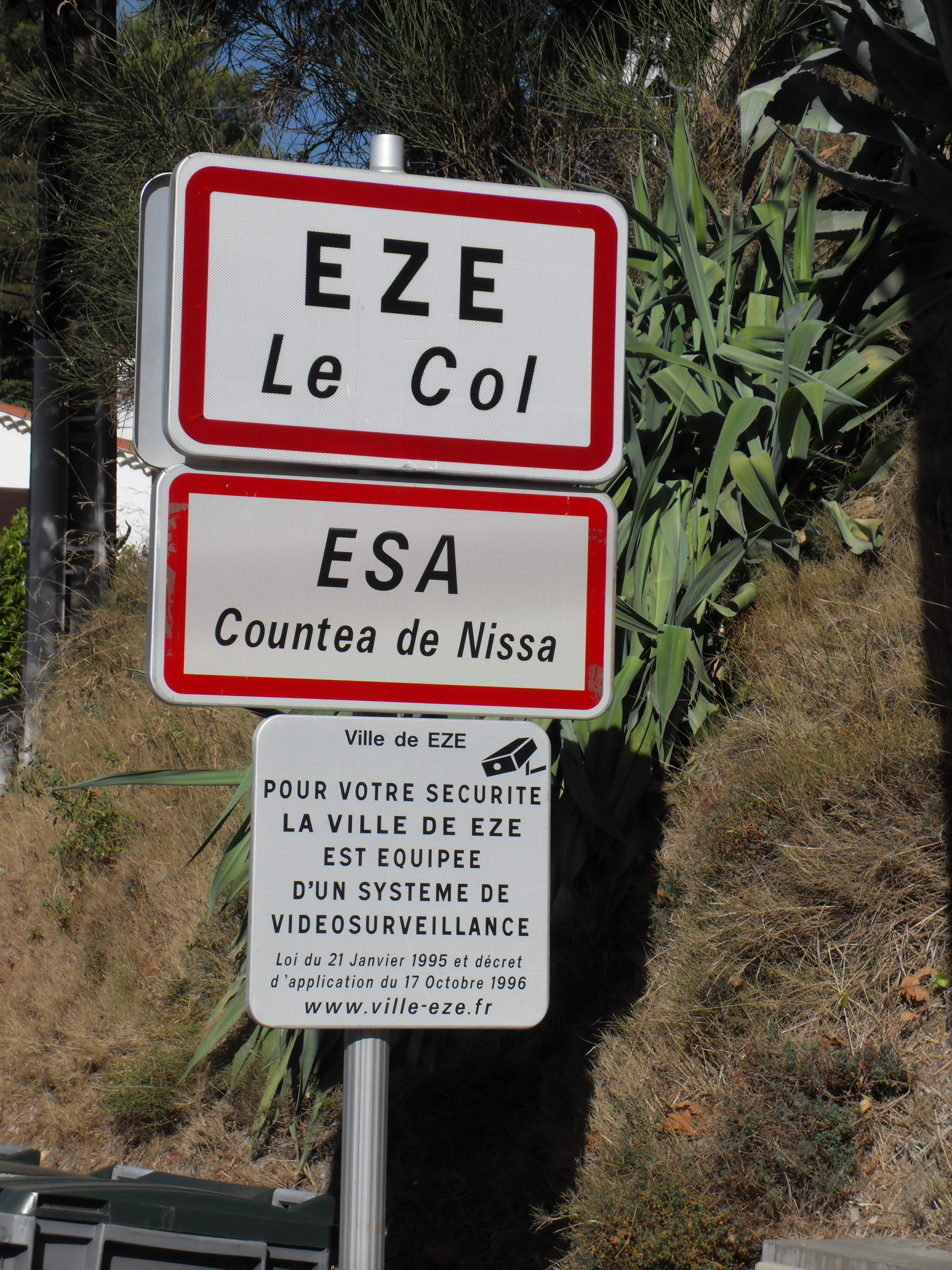
- Location: Alpes-Maritimes, France
- Start: Nice (France)
- Gain in altitude: 490 m (1,610 ft)
- Length of climb: 9.6 km (6.0 mi)
- Maximum elevation: 507 m (1,663 ft)
- Average gradient: 4.7 %
- Maximum gradient: 8 %

The Col d'Èze is a mountain pass in the Alpes-Maritimes department of France. It is located between Nice and Monaco, near to La Trinité.

== Cycling ==
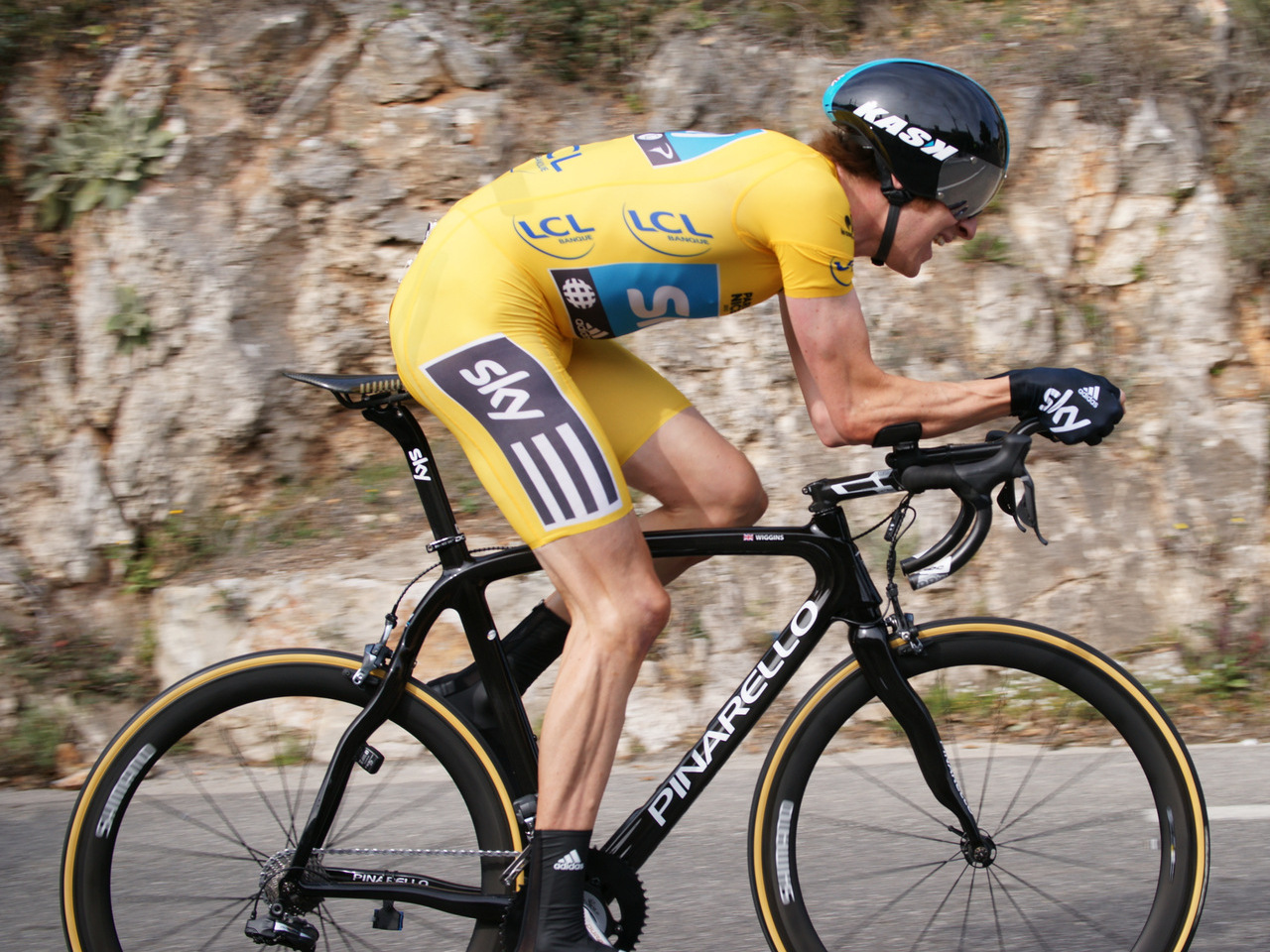
Bradley Wiggins riding the Col d'Eze time trial on the final stage of the 2012 Paris–Nice, which he won, setting a climbing record and claiming the race general classification.

The pass is particularly well known for its frequent inclusion in the Paris–Nice road cycling stage race, where it has often formed the final decisive stage of the race. From 1969 to 1995 the race finished with a time trial up the Col d'Èze, except in 1977 when landslides had blocked the road. The Col d'Èze is a 9 km climb, starting from Nice and climbing to 507 m altitude. It is named after the village of Èze, part of the municipality of Nice. Sean Kelly won the Col d'Èze time trial five times in his seven-year dominance.

In 1996, the finish was moved back to the Promenade des Anglais because of the low number of spectators on Col d'Eze and to take advantage of funding from the city of Nice. From 1998 to 2011, the final stage was a road race – usually on a hilly terrain with the climbs of the Col d'Èze and La Turbie - starting and ending in Nice. In recent years the race often returns to a final Col d'Eze time trial stage. Bradley Wiggins set a new climbing record in 2012 of 19' 12" on his way to overall victory.

The mountain was also climbed during the 1953 Tour de France (ranked as a 2nd category mountain). In the 2020 Tour de France, it was again given category 2 status.

The mountain will be featured on the final stage, Stage 9, of the 2026 Tour de France Femmes, as the mountain (again as a category 2 climb) will be climbed four times before finishing on the Promenade des Anglais.
