= Sigrid Ytterhus Haugset =

Norwegian cyclist (born 1999)

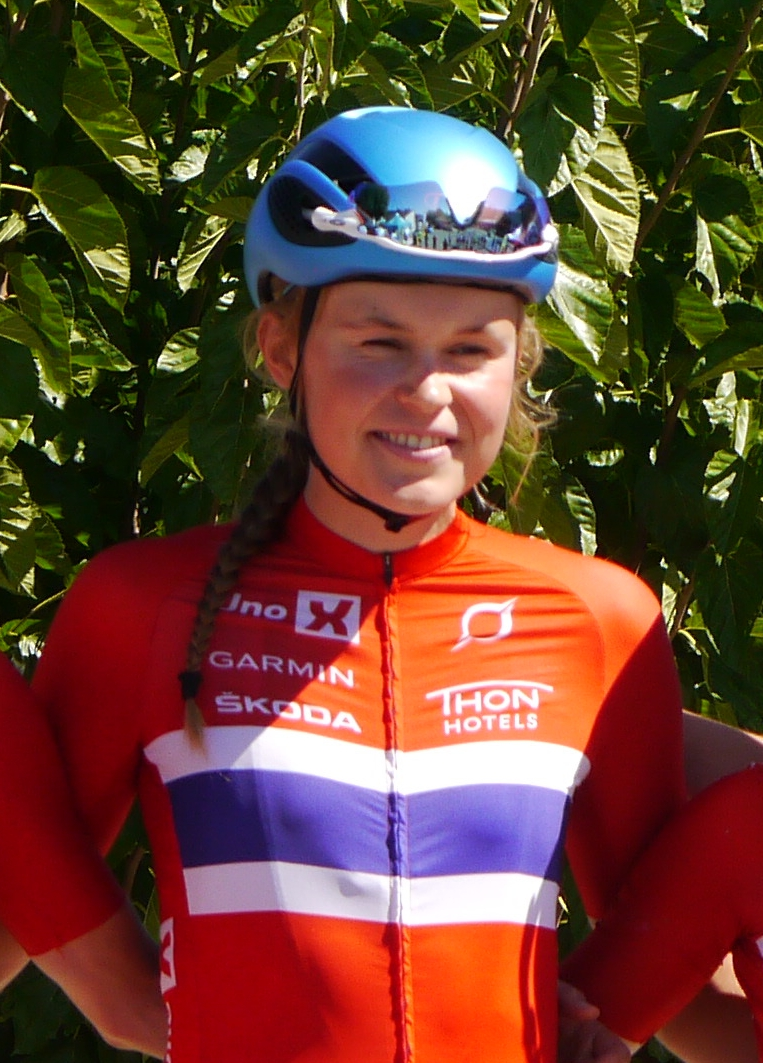
- Ytterhus Haugset in 2022

Personal information
- Born: 1 March 1999 (age 27) Berkåk, Norway

Cycling career
- Sport: Cycling
- Current team: Uno-X Mobility
- Discipline: Road
- Role: Rider

Professional teams
- 2022–2025: Team Coop–Hitec Products
- 2026–: Uno-X Mobility

Major wins
- Major Tours Tour de France 1 individual stage (2026) One-day races and Classics National Road Race Championships (2026)

Sigrid Ytterhus Haugset (born 1 March 1999) is a Norwegian cyclist, who currently rides for UCI Women's WorldTeam Uno-X Mobility.

== Career ==
Ytterhus Haugset had a strong start to the 2025 season before missing two months due to crashing at Paris–Roubaix. Despite breaking her hip, she finished the race in 71st.

In 2026 she signed with Uno-X Mobility. She made her debut for the team at Trofeo Marratxi-Felanitx, finishing fourth.

== Major results ==
2023
3rd Time trial, National Road Championships
2024
3rd Time trial, National Road Championships
2025
3rd Time trial, National Road Championships
2026
National Road Championships

1st Road race
2nd Time trial

Tour de France

1st Stage 3
Held after Stage 3
Combativity award Stage 3
