= 2026 Tour de France Femmes =

Women's cycling race

2026 UCI Women's World Tour, race 22 of 26
- Route of the 2026 Tour de France Femmes

Race details
- Dates: 1–9 August 2026
- Stages: 9
- Distance: 1,174.7 km (729.9 mi)
- Winning time: 30h 54' 51"

Results
| Jersey awarded to the overall winner | Winner | Demi Vollering (NED) | (FDJ United–Suez) |
| | Second | Katarzyna Niewiadoma-Phinney (POL) | (Canyon//SRAM) |
| | Third | Elisa Longo Borghini (ITA) | (UAE Team L'Imad) |
| Jersey awarded to the points classification winner | Points | Lorena Wiebes (NED) | (Team SD Worx–Protime) |
| Jersey awarded to the mountains classification winner | Mountains | Puck Pieterse (NED) | (Fenix–Premier Tech) |
| Jersey awarded to the young rider classification winner | Young rider | Antonia Niedermaier (GER) | (Canyon//SRAM) |
| Jersey awarded to the combativity classification winner | Combativity | Katarzyna Niewiadoma-Phinney (POL) | (Canyon//SRAM) |
| Jersey awarded to the team classification winner | Team | (United Arab Emirates) UAE Team L'Imad | |

The 2026 Tour de France Femmes (officially Tour de France Femmes avec Zwift) was the fifth edition of the Tour de France Femmes. The race took place from 1 August to 9 August 2026, part of the 2026 UCI Women's World Tour. The race was organised by the Amaury Sport Organisation (ASO), which also organises the men's Tour de France. From 2026, more ranking points were awarded at the Tour, the Giro d'Italia Women and the Vuelta Femenina – elevating the races in status compared to other races in the UCI Women's World Tour.

The race was won by Dutch rider Demi Vollering (FDJ United–Suez) for the second time. Her margin of victory was over a minute, after she performed strongly in the individual time trial on stage 4, won the hilly stage 5, limited her time losses on the climb to Mont Ventoux before winning the final two stages. Second place overall was 2024 winner Katarzyna Niewiadoma-Phinney (Canyon//SRAM), who also took the combativity award, after she won stage 7 on Mont Ventoux, and fighting for the overall victory on the final two stages. Elisa Longo Borghini (UAE Team L'Imad) finished third overall, after the winner of the individual time trial Marlen Reusser (Movistar Team) fell to 14th overall after a crash on the final stage.

In the race's other classifications, Lorena Wiebes (Team SD Worx–Protime) won the green jersey of the points classification for the second year in succession. Puck Pieterse (Fenix–Premier Tech) took the polka-dot jersey as the winner of the Queen of the Mountains classification. Antonia Niedermaier (Canyon//SRAM) took the white jersey as the winner of the young riders classification after finishing 4th overall, which was awarded to the best-placed rider under the age of 24. UAE Team L'Imad won the team classification as the team with the lowest aggregate time among their three best-placed riders.

The race was praised by the media, who considered it to be one of the most exciting and competitive editions of the race, praising the rivalry between Vollering and Niewiadoma-Phinney. The Guardian and The Wall Street Journal argued that the race offered more compelling racing than the men's Tour, and there were calls for a longer race in future, as well as greater live television coverage.

== Teams ==
Twenty-one teams took part in the race, one fewer than in previous editions. The teams were announced on 18 February 2026. All 14 UCI Women's WorldTeams were automatically invited. They were joined by seven UCI Women's ProTeams selected by ASO, the organisers of the Tour. A total of 147 riders from 27 nationalities started the race, with the Netherlands having the largest contingent (30 riders).

UCI Women's WorldTeams

- AG Insurance–Soudal
- Canyon//SRAM
- EF Education–Oatly
- FDJ United–Suez
- Fenix–Premier Tech
- Human Powered Health
- Lidl–Trek
- Liv AlUla Jayco
- Movistar Team
- Team Picnic–PostNL
- Team SD Worx–Protime
- UAE Team L'Imad
- Uno-X Mobility
- Visma–Lease a Bike

UCI Women's ProTeams

- Cofidis
- Laboral Kutxa–Fundación Euskadi
- Lotto–Intermarché Ladies
- Ma Petite Entreprise
- Mayenne Monbana My Pie
- St. Michel–Preference Home–Auber93
- VolkerWessels Women Cyclingteam

== Route and stages ==
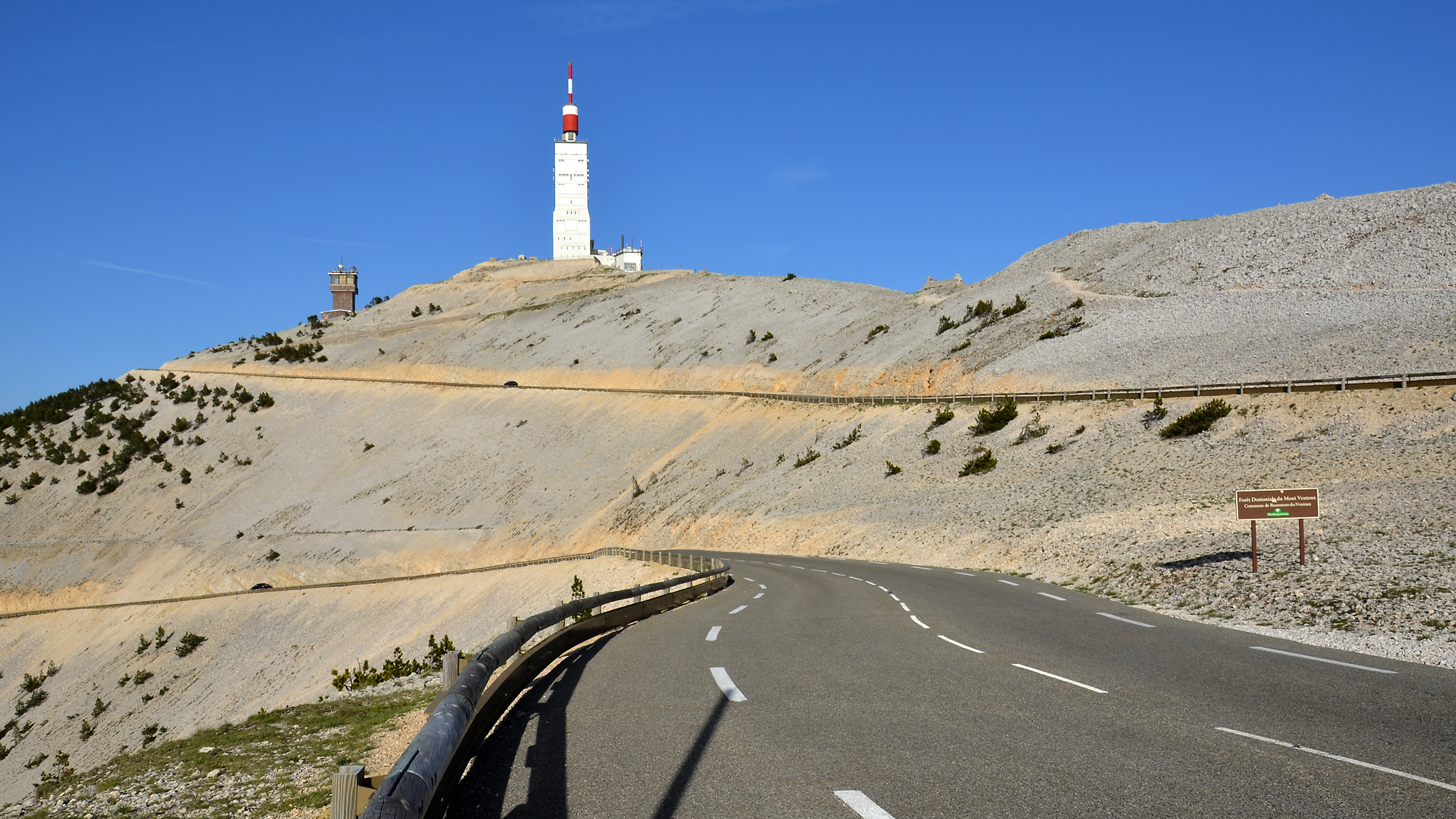
Stage 7 had a summit finish at Mont Ventoux, at an elevation of 1,910 m (6,270 ft)

In June 2025, it was announced that 2026 edition would have a Grand Départ in Switzerland. The race started in August – a week after the men's race, with ASO choosing to avoid an overlap with the men's race to allow for resources to be shared between the two races. The Guardian noted that the "new stand-alone date for the Femmes reveals how quickly the race has established itself and how popular it has become, particularly after the win of France’s Pauline Ferrand-Prévot". Prior to the route announcement, Le Dauphiné libéré reported rumours that the race would visit Mont Ventoux for the first time, with Ici reporting that Dijon would host a time trial.

In October 2025, the full route was announced by race director Marion Rousse. The route has nine days of racing with nine stages, covering a total of 1,175 km (730 mi) with 18,795 metres (61,663 ft) of elevation gain – the longest distance and most elevation gain of any Tour de France Femmes. The first three stages will take place in Switzerland, before heading north for an individual time trial finishing in Dijon. The route then heads south towards the Mediterranean, with the queen stage on stage 7 having a summit finish at Mont Ventoux, at an elevation of 1,910 m (6,270 ft). Mont Ventoux has previously been tackled by the women's professional peloton at the 2006 Grande Boucle Féminine Internationale, 2022 Mont Ventoux Dénivelé Challenge and the 2016 Tour Cycliste Féminin International de l'Ardèche. The final stage will be a circuit around Nice, with four ascents of the Col d'Èze before a finish on the Promenade des Anglais. Climbs were categorised from category 4 (the easiest) to hors catégorie (the most difficult), with Mont Ventoux the only hors catégorie climb on the route.

Reacting to the route, L'Équipe considered that the route was the toughest so far, Velo stated that the route offered "something for each type of rider", whereas Escape Collective thought that there was "no real opportunities for the sprinters". The Athletic stated that the race "reaches new heights on Ventoux", with L'Équipe considered that "the women's Tour continues its momentum of discovering legendary climbs" with the inclusion on Mont Ventoux. Sporza considered that the final stage in Nice would be "incredibly tough" and that the Tour would remain exciting "until the very end". Rousse called the route "mischievous", noting that there were difficulties on every single stage. Rousse hoped the time trial on stage 4 would allow riders like Marlen Reusser to gain time, enhancing the battle for the general classification.

Defending champion Ferrand-Prévot stated that the route was "super nice" and "beautiful", adding that she was "ready to put in the work on the time trial". 2024 winner Katarzyna Niewiadoma-Phinney stated that she “definitely [likes] the course", and that " the time trial [...] stood out to me the most". French rider Marion Bunel stated she thought the "route [was] made for Pauline".

Stage characteristics
| Stage | Date | Course | Distance | Type | Winner |
|---|---|---|---|---|---|
| 1 | 1 August | Lausanne (Switzerland) to Lausanne (Switzerland) | 138 km (86 mi) | Flat stage | Lorena Wiebes (NED) |
| 2 | 2 August | Aigle (Switzerland) to Geneva (Switzerland) | 147.9 km (91.9 mi) | Flat stage | Lorena Wiebes (NED) |
| 3 | 3 August | Geneva (Switzerland) to Poligny | 156.5 km (97.2 mi) | Hilly stage | Sigrid Ytterhus Haugset (NOR) |
| 4 | 4 August | Gevrey-Chambertin to Dijon | 21 km (13 mi) | Individual time trial | Marlen Reusser (SUI) |
| 5 | 5 August | Mâcon to Belleville-en-Beaujolais | 140 km (87 mi) | Hilly stage | Demi Vollering (NED) |
| 6 | 6 August | Montbrison to Tournon-sur-Rhône | 153.4 km (95.3 mi) | Hilly stage | Kimberley Le Court-Pienaar (MRI) |
| 7 | 7 August | La Voulte-sur-Rhône to Mont Ventoux | 146.8 km (91.2 mi) | Mountain stage | Katarzyna Niewiadoma-Phinney (POL) |
| 8 | 8 August | Sisteron to Nice | 171.9 km (106.8 mi) | Flat stage | Demi Vollering (NED) |
| 9 | 9 August | Nice to Nice | 99.2 km (61.6 mi) | Mountain stage | Demi Vollering (NED) |
| Total | | | 1,174.7 km (729.9 mi) | | |

== Race overview ==
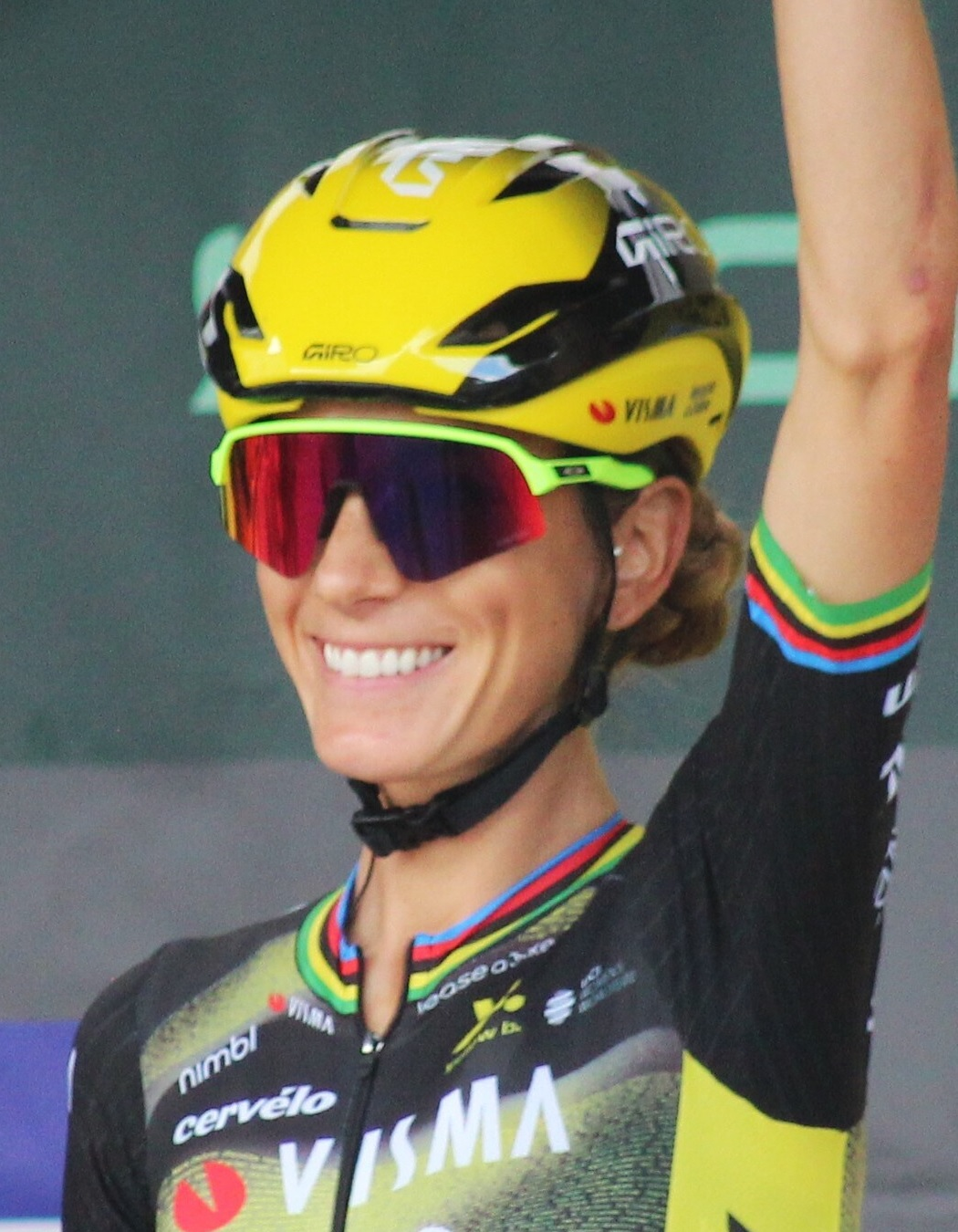
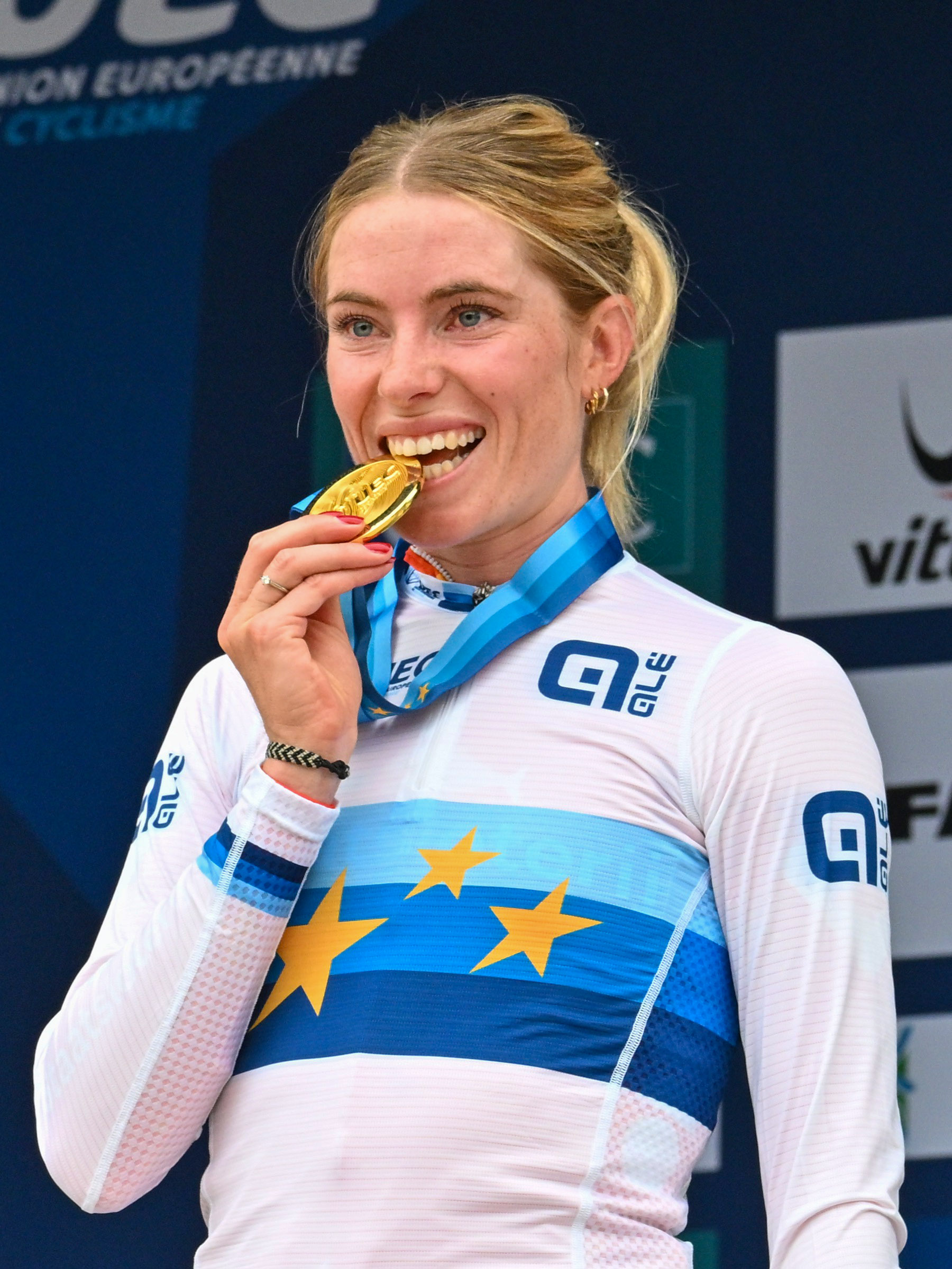
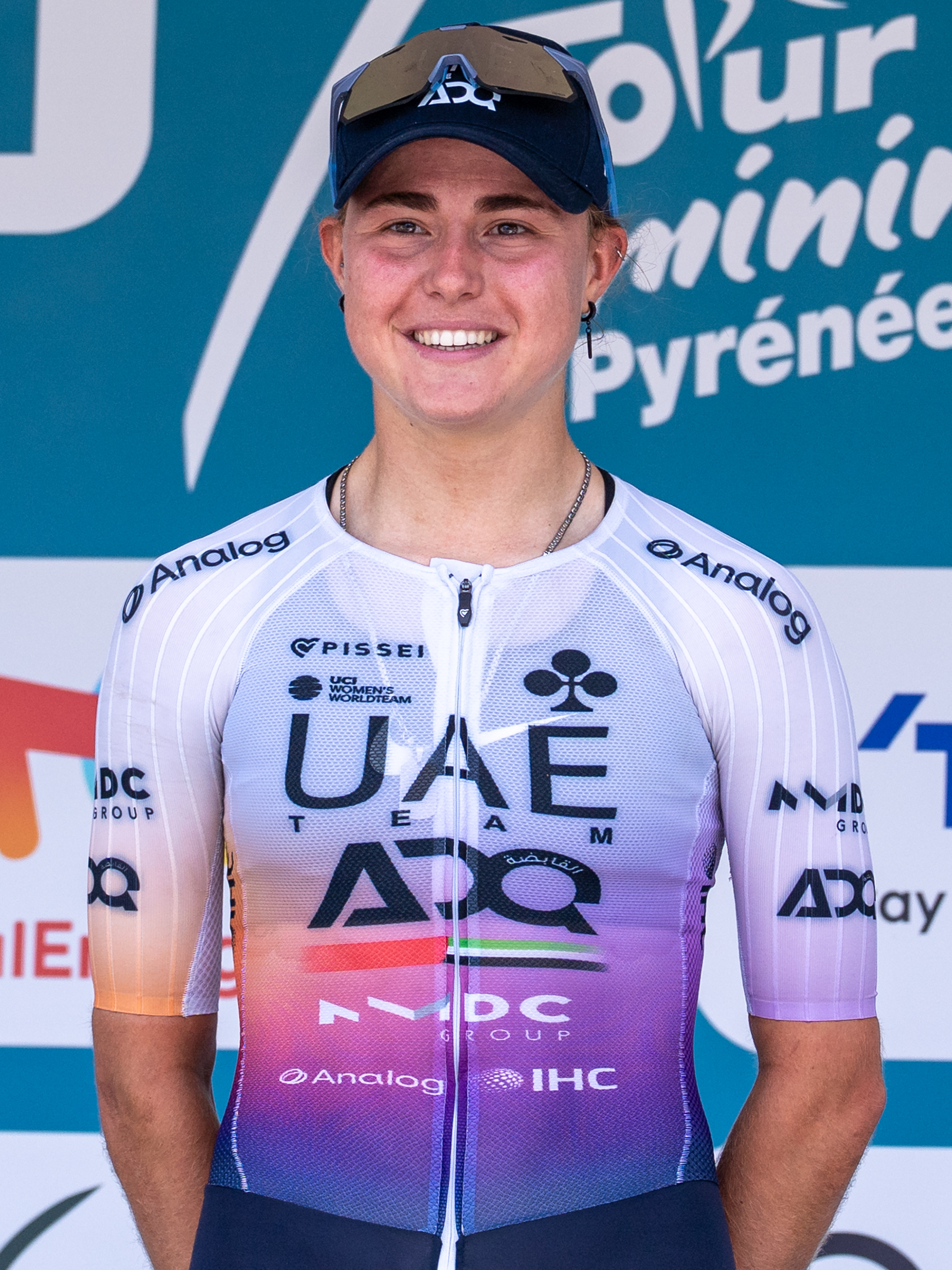
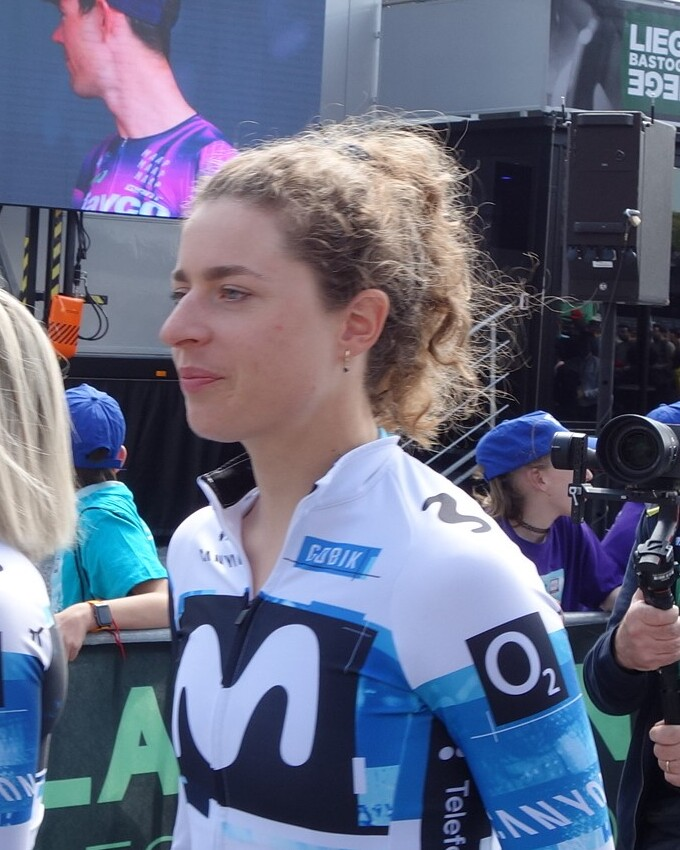
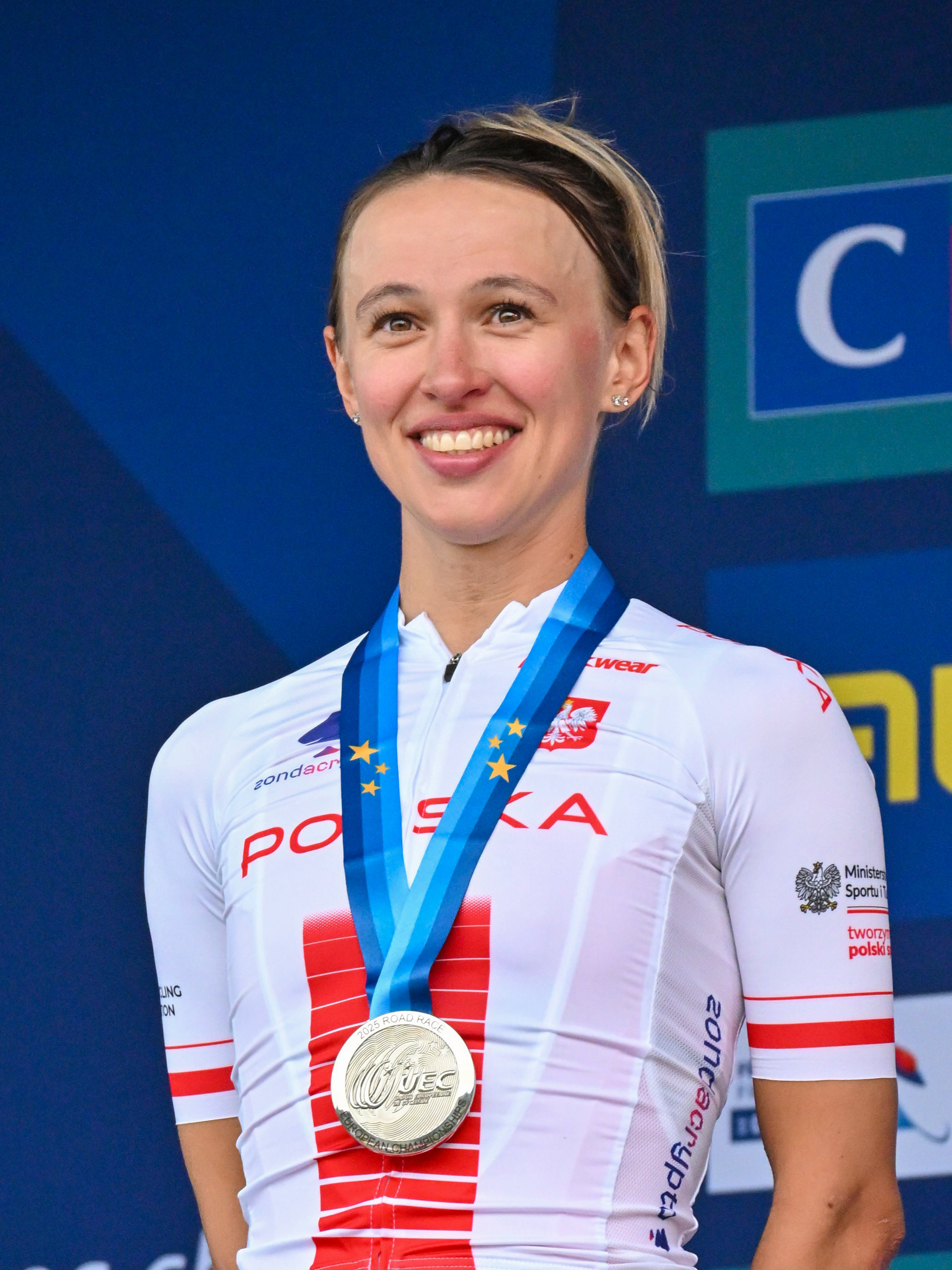
(left to right) Pauline Ferrand-Prévot, Demi Vollering, Paula Blasi, Marlen Reusser and Katarzyna Niewiadoma-Phinney were considered contenders for the general classification (GC)

Ahead of the race, a large number of riders were considered to be contenders for the general classification (GC), with no clear favourite. Contenders included defending champion Pauline Ferrand-Prévot, 2023 winner Demi Vollering (following her victory at the Giro d'Italia Women), Paula Blasi (following her victory at La Vuelta Femenina), Marlen Reusser (following her victory at Tour de Suisse Women) and 2024 winner Katarzyna Niewiadoma-Phinney (following strong performances in the spring classics and at the Tour de Suisse Women). Other contenders for GC included Elisa Longo Borghini, Anna van der Breggen, Kimberley Le Court-Pienaar and Niamh Fisher-Black.

Lorena Wiebes and Marianne Vos were considered favourites for the points classification for best sprinter; Blasi, Marion Bunel, Antonia Niedermaier and Isabella Holmgren were considered favourites for the young rider classification for best rider under the age of 24.

Media considered that the race would be "uncontrollable", with a large number of GC contenders and stages where different riders could lose or gain time. It was considered that the key stages would be the individual time trial in Dijon on stage 4, the summit finish to Mont Ventoux on stage 7 and the multiple ascents of the Col d'Èze on the final stage to Nice. UAE Team L'Imad noted that Longo Borghini and Dominika Włodarczyk (who finished 4th overall at the 2025 edition) would be leading their team, rather than La Vuelta Femenina winner Blasi. Media noted that this was likely due to Blasi's rumoured move to Movistar Team for 2027. The prize fund was €265,000 (compared to €2.5 million for the men's tour), with €50,000 for the winner of the general classification – making it one of the richest races in women's cycling.

=== Grand Départ in Switzerland ===
Stage 1 took place in Switzerland (the host of the Grand Départ), starting and finishing in Lausanne with a final climb to the finish 2.6 km (1.6 mi) in length with an average gradient of 4.6%. A four-rider breakaway including Océane Mahé (Ma Petite Entreprise) took the majority of the points in the Queen of the Mountains (QoM) classification, with Mahé securing the jersey at the end of the day. On the descent to Lake Geneva, Marlen Reusser (Movistar Team) crashed after her teammate Arlenis Sierra overshot a corner. Both remounted their bike and chased back onto the peloton. The break was caught with 6 km (3.7 mi) remaining as the race entered Lausanne. On the Côte Saint-Francois climb to the finish, Kimberley Le Court-Pienaar (AG Insurance–Soudal) attacked on the steepest section, but was unable to escape. As the peloton rapidly reduced in size on the climb, several attacks were made, including by Demi Vollering (FDJ United–Suez). However, Lorena Wiebes (Team SD Worx–Protime) had been able to follow, and pushed on the final flat to the line to take her sixth Tour stage win and second yellow jersey of her career. Bonus seconds at the finish line gave Wiebes a lead of 4 seconds over Le Court-Pienaar and 6 seconds over Vollering. Wiebes also took the lead in the points classification. Paula Blasi (UAE Team L'Imad) took the white jersey of the young rider classification.

The peloton in Vionnaz during stage 2

Stage 2 was a flat course from Aigle to Geneva. With under 40 km (25 mi) remaining, Riejanne Markus (Lidl–Trek) bridged across to the remnants of a breakaway, and built up a lead of around a minute. Markus limited her losses, with a 30 second lead with 6 km (3.7 mi) to go. The peloton chased furiously, realising that Markus had the potential to make it to the line. Wiebes' teammate Lotte Kopecky (Team SD Worx–Protime) led the chase, with the gap falling to under 15 seconds and then to just five seconds at the flamme rouge with 1 km (0.62 mi) to go as Markus was caught. In the final sprint, no one could compete with the speed of Wiebes, who took her second stage win of the Tour. There were no changes to the classifications, with Wiebes extending her lead in the points classification to 81 points ahead of Le Court-Pienaar.

=== Jura, individual time trial in Dijon and the Massif Central ===
Stage 3 took the riders northwards into France, with a hilly stage in the Jura Mountains to Poligny. Puck Pieterse (Fenix–Premier Tech) took maximum mountain points on the first-category climb of the Col de la Faucille, taking the lead in the mountains classification later in the stage. Sigrid Ytterhus Haugset (Uno-X Mobility) attacked solo from the peloton with 88 km (55 mi) remaining, building a lead of 5 minutes as Kopecky attacked to chase Haugset. On the climb of Côte de Chaux-Champagny, the gap between Kopecky and Haugset was around 30 seconds, with the peloton nearly 4 minutes behind. GC contenders attempted attacks on the climb, reducing the gap to Haugset to 2 minutes 20 seconds, before they realised they would not catch the pair. In the run to the finish, Kopecky reduced the gap to Haugset to 12 seconds with 11 km (6.8 mi) to go. However she suffered cramps in the heat, and was unable to catch her before the line. Haugset therefore took the stage win by 1 min 24 s over Kopecky, taking the yellow jersey, giving her a lead of just over 2 minutes on GC ahead of Le Court-Pienaar. A group of 38 riders including the GC contenders finished 2 min 48 s behind Haugset, with Marianne Vos (Visma–Lease a Bike) outsprinting Le Court-Pienaar to deny her the remaining bonus seconds. In the other classifications, Pieterse took the polka dot jersey of the mountains classification and Wiebes and Blasi remained in the lead of the points and young rider classifications respectively.

Stage 4 was an individual time trial to Dijon, over a 21 km (13 mi) course. Lotte Claes (Fenix–Premier Tech) was the first rider to set a time under 28 min 30 s, before Lieke Nooijen (Visma–Lease a Bike) beat her time by 51 seconds after a fast descent. One of the favourites for the time trial – Zoe Bäckstedt (Canyon//SRAM) – set similar times to Nooijen, but lost time on the descent, finishing 16 seconds slower. GC contenders then tackled the course, with both Blasi and Anna van der Breggen (Team SD Worx–Protime) setting times over a minute behind Nooijen. Time trial specialist Reusser set a time of 27 min 30 s, beating Nooijen by 4 seconds. Pauline Ferrand-Prévot (Visma–Lease a Bike) set a time 2 min 13 s slower than Reusser, with French media calling the performance "catastrophic". Acknowledging that the time trial wasn't their speciality, Katarzyna Niewiadoma-Phinney (Canyon//SRAM) nevertheless set a time 1 min 9 s slower than Reusser to secure 6th overall. Elisa Longo Borghini (UAE Team L'Imad) was on track to set a fast time, but had a mechanical and needed to change her bike – eventually finishing 1 min 3 s slower than Reusser. Vollering set a fast time, 18 seconds slower than Reusser to take 2nd overall on GC. Riding last on the stage as the yellow jersey holder, Haugset set a time over 3 minutes slower than Reusser, losing her lead and falling to 4th overall. Reusser therefore took the lead in GC, expressing delight with her win following her "Project Dijon" plan to win the stage. Ferrand-Prévot was the biggest GC contender to lose time, falling to 14th overall, 2 min 13 s behind Reusser.

Stage 5 headed south, with a hilly route in the Massif Central with eight categorised climbs. Pieterse took mountain points at the first six categorised climbs to extend her lead in the mountains classification. With the gap from the peloton to the break around 2 minutes with 50 km (31 mi) to go, FDJ United–Suez increased the pace of the peloton. On the third-category Col de Durbize climb, the peloton fell apart as Vollering accelerated, with GC contenders Ferrand-Prévot, Van der Breggen, Longo Borghini and Blasi all dropped. After overtaking the remainder of the breakaway, Vollering attacked again on the final climb of Mont Brouilly, with only Reusser and Niewiadoma-Phinney able to follow. In the sprint finish, Niewiadoma-Phinney attempted am attack with 400 m (1,300 ft) to go, but Vollering caught her before the line to take her first stage win of the Tour. Vollering therefore cut Reusser's GC lead to 12 seconds, with Niewiadoma-Phinney moving into 3rd overall, 1 min 17 s behind Reusser. Wiebes maintained the green jersey of the points competition, Pieterse remained in the polka dot jersey of the mountains classification and Antonia Niedermaier (Canyon//SRAM) moved into the lead of the young rider classification after Blasi lost nearly 3 and a half minutes. After the stage, Ferrand-Prévot admitted that her chances of defending her title were "over" and that "my rivals are clearly superior", with a gap of over 5 minutes between herself and Reusser.

Stage 6 continued south, another hilly stage in the Massif Central with six categorised climbs. An early break was caught on the penultimate climb of the day, before Célia Gery (FDJ United–Suez) attacked on the descent with 34 km (21 mi) to go. A strong group of riders including Longo Borghini and Pieterse broke from the peloton to chase Gery, becoming a group of six with 30 km (19 mi) to go. Onto the last climb of the day, the group had a 30 second lead over a reduced peloton. Pieterse then took the points at the top of the climb, extending her lead in the mountains classification. After the climb, Le Court-Pienaar and Markus attacked from the peloton on a false flat and joined the group of six, with Le Court-Pienaar taking the bonus seconds available with 9 km (5.6 mi) to the finish. With 5 km (3.1 mi) remaining, it was clear that the GC contenders were unwilling to chase and the group of eight would contest the stage win. Multiple attacks were attempted in the final kilometres to no avail. In the sprint finish, Le Court-Pienaar attacked with 300 m (980 ft) to go, taking her second career stage win at the Tour, and moving into 9th overall on GC. Longo Borghini moved into 4th overall, albeit nearly two and a half minutes behind Reusser. Reacting to her win, Le Court-Pienaar stated that "people don’t really remember top 10 or top five riders in Tour, but they do remember stage winners".

=== Ventoux and Nice ===
==== Mont Ventoux ====
Stage 7 was considered to be the queen stage of the race, taking riders 144 km (89 mi) to a summit finish at Mont Ventoux at an elevation of 1,910 m (6,270 ft). The hors catégorie climb of Mont Ventoux is 15.7 km (9.8 mi) in length with an average gradient of 8.8%.

Prior to the start of the stage, Van der Breggen abandoned the race, after losing 13 minutes on stage 6. Pieterse took the mountain points at the first two climbs, extending her lead and securing victory in the classification if she finished the Tour. As the climb of Mont Ventoux began, FDJ United–Suez set a fast pace. Le Court-Pienaar and Ferrand-Prévot were dropped, as the GC group reduced to just 14 riders. With around 11 km (6.8 mi) to go, Vollering attacked, with Reusser and Niewiadoma-Phinney able to follow. Niedermaier, Blasi, Longo Borghini and Cédrine Kerbaol formed a chase group behind them.

Niewiadoma-Phinney then attacked with just less than 10 km (6.2 mi) to the summit, quickly pulling out a 10 second lead. By Chalet Reynard, her lead was around a minute, with the chase group another 20 seconds behind. Niewiadoma-Phinney continued to increase her advantage as Vollering and Reusser did not work together to chase on the climb. Passing the flamme rouge, she had a lead of nearly 2 minutes and was able to celebrate her first stage win at the Tour. Vollering then attacked Reusser in the final 600m, gaining 30 seconds to finish 1 min 16 s behind Niewiadoma-Phinney. Longo Borghini finished third, 26 seconds further back and Reusser was fourth, another 4 seconds back. Niedermaier extended her lead in the young rider classification to over a minute ahead of Blasi.

Owing to her stage win, Niewiadoma-Phinney took the yellow jersey with a lead of 15 seconds ahead of Vollering, with Reusser falling to 3rd overall, 24 seconds further back. Niewiadoma-Phinney stated that "it means the world to me to get the yellow jersey by winning on the Ventoux". Looking forward to the final 2 stages, she expected "a massive fight [...] – points, bonus seconds, everything – because the gap is so small".

==== Final two stages ====
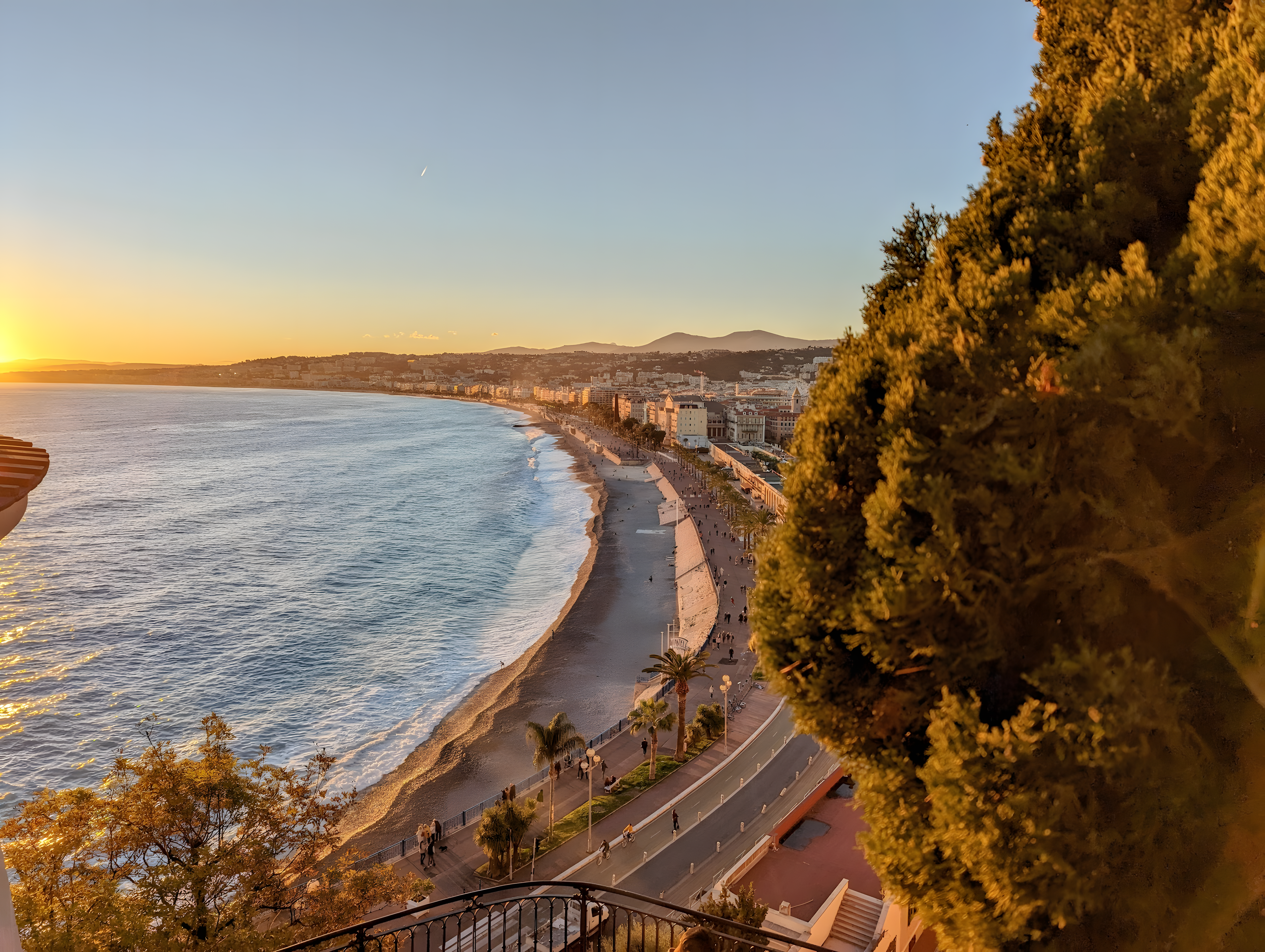
The final two stages finished on the Promenade des Anglais in Nice

Stage 8 headed south out of the French Alps to the city of Nice over a hilly course. It was the longest stage of the race at 171.9 km (106.8 mi) in length. Prior to the start of the stage, Ferrand-Prévot abandoned the race due to illness. A two-rider breakaway of Maëva Squiban (UAE Team L'Imad) and Loes Adegeest (Lidl–Trek) hoped to escape to the finish and take the stage win, however Squiban crashed heavily on the descent of the Côte de Colomars with around 15 km (9.3 mi) to go. On the final climb 7.7 km (4.8 mi) before the finish, FDJ United–Suez set a fast pace at the front of the peloton, before Vollering attacked on the steep slopes. She opened a small gap ahead of her GC contenders, with Niewiadoma-Phinney and Longo Borghini quickly giving chase. With 6 km (3.7 mi) from the top of the climb to the finish line, Vollering pushed on, taking her second stage win of the Tour by 17 seconds and taking the yellow jersey by 8 seconds. Following the stage, Niewiadoma-Phinney criticised FDJ United–Suez, stating that "Gery, on purpose, just blocked me to the barriers" at the start of the final climb. Despite appeals to the race commissaires by Canyon//SRAM, no action was taken against Gery or FDJ United–Suez. Vollering looked forward to the final stage, stating "tomorrow I start in yellow and I will do everything in my power to keep it".

Stage 9 was a circuit race in Nice, tackling the Col d'Èze four times. On the final lap, a shorter and steeper route was taken, before a descent to the finish on the Promenade des Anglais in Nice. Several attacks occurred on the first lap, to no avail. Wiebes came third in the intermediate sprint, securing her green jersey of the points classification. On the second time up the Col d'Èze, Backstedt rode strongly to reduce the group to just 11 riders, with Cycling News calling her performance "a climbing time trial". On the descent, Reusser crashed heavily and took several minutes to remount her bike, eventually continuing to ride – albeit with the gruppetto. On the third lap, Isabella Holmgren (Lidl–Trek) attacked, establishing a minute lead at the top of the climb. On the final lap, Holmgren had a 30 second advantage going into the steeper ascent of the Col d'Èze. She was caught, as Niewiadoma-Phinney and Vollering then attempted attacks to escape solo. The pair then led the race ahead of a GC group including Longo Borghini, Niedermaier and Blasi.

With 800 m (2,600 ft) to the top of the Col d'Èze, Vollering attacked decisively and Niewiadoma-Phinney was unable to follow. Summitting the climb in the lead, Vollering then rode down the 15 km (9.3 mi) descent to the finish at pace – crossing the finishing line on the Promenade des Anglais 1 min 4 s ahead of Niewiadoma-Phinney, taking her second Tour de France Femmes victory. Longo Borghini finished 1 min 14 s behind Vollering, taking 3rd overall from Reusser – who finished 24 minutes behind Vollering and fell to 14th overall following her crash. Wiebes, Pieterse, Niedermaier all finished the stage safely to confirm their classification victories.

=== Results ===
In the final general classification (GC), Demi Vollering (FDJ United–Suez) won the Tour de France Femmes for the second time, with an advantage over 2024 winner Katarzyna Niewiadoma-Phinney (Canyon//SRAM) of around a minute. Niewiadoma-Phinney also took the combativity award, following her stage win on Ventoux and rivalry with Vollering throughout the race. Third overall was Elisa Longo Borghini (UAE Team L'Imad), nearly four and a half minutes behind Vollering.

In the race's other classifications, Lorena Wiebes (Team SD Worx–Protime) won the green jersey of the points classification for the second year in succession. Wiebes had 181 points, 29 more than Vollering in second place. Puck Pieterse (Fenix–Premier Tech) took the polka-dot jersey as the winner of the Queen of the Mountains (QoM) classification. Pieterse had 55 points, 25 more than Vollering in second place. Antonia Niedermaier (Canyon//SRAM) took the white jersey as the winner of the young riders classification after finishing 4th overall, which was awarded to the best-placed rider under the age of 24. UAE Team L'Imad won the team classification as the team with the lowest aggregate time among their three best-placed riders. Out of the 147 starters, 115 finished the event.

Vollering was delighted with her win, stating that "it's not only the dream to win in yellow here, to win a second Tour de France, but it's the dream to live this life, to work hard together with people with a lot of passion". Vollering noted she had spoken to Niewiadoma-Phinney regarding the incident on stage 8, explaining that "we really didn't want to block her on purpose" and that "it was all good in the end. I think it was good that we had a talk together". She expressed that she wanted to make clear that her and her team "deserve to win a beautiful Tour de France Femmes, with humility and with pride". Accepting her second place, Niewiadoma-Phinney was positive about her performance, stating she "felt stronger than in any other edition" and [Demi] motivates me to come back even stronger". Media noted that she had finished on the podium at all five editions of the Tour de France Femmes. UAE Team L'Imad were delighted with their performance, with a victory in the team classification, and Longo Borghini, Blasi and Dominika Włodarczyk finishing 3rd, 5th and 7th overall. The directeur sportif of Movistar Team expressed that Reusser and the team were sad to lose third place on the final stage, noting "today we lost big, but you can only lose big if you first have something".

== Classification leadership ==
Classification leadership by stage
| Stage | Winner | General classification | Points classification | Mountains classification | Young rider classification | Team classification | Combativity award |
|---|---|---|---|---|---|---|---|
| 1 | Lorena Wiebes | Lorena Wiebes | Lorena Wiebes (Note: For stages 2 and 3, the rider in third place in the points classification wore the green jersey, as Lorena Wiebes led the general classification, so was wearing the yellow jersey, and second placed Kimberley Le Court-Pienaar was obligated to wear the Mauritian national champion's jersey. On stage 2, the green jersey was worn by Idoia Eraso and on stage 3 by Elisa Balsamo.) | Océane Mahé | Paula Blasi | UAE Team L'Imad | Nikola Nosková |
| 2 | Lorena Wiebes | Lorena Wiebes | Lorena Wiebes | Océane Mahé | Paula Blasi | UAE Team L'Imad | Riejanne Markus |
| 3 | Sigrid Ytterhus Haugset | Sigrid Ytterhus Haugset | Lorena Wiebes | Puck Pieterse | Paula Blasi | Team SD Worx–Protime | Sigrid Ytterhus Haugset |
| 4 | Marlen Reusser | Marlen Reusser | Lorena Wiebes | Puck Pieterse | Paula Blasi | Team SD Worx–Protime | no award |
| 5 | Demi Vollering | Marlen Reusser | Lorena Wiebes | Puck Pieterse | Antonia Niedermaier | UAE Team L'Imad | Demi Vollering |
| 6 | Kimberley Le Court-Pienaar | Marlen Reusser | Lorena Wiebes | Puck Pieterse | Antonia Niedermaier | UAE Team L'Imad | Célia Gery |
| 7 | Katarzyna Niewiadoma-Phinney | Katarzyna Niewiadoma-Phinney | Lorena Wiebes | Puck Pieterse | Antonia Niedermaier | UAE Team L'Imad | Katarzyna Niewiadoma-Phinney |
| 8 | Demi Vollering | Demi Vollering | Lorena Wiebes | Puck Pieterse | Antonia Niedermaier | UAE Team L'Imad | Loes Adegeest |
| 9 | Demi Vollering | Demi Vollering | Lorena Wiebes | Puck Pieterse | Antonia Niedermaier | UAE Team L'Imad | Isabella Holmgren |
| Final | | Demi Vollering | Lorena Wiebes | Puck Pieterse | Antonia Niedermaier | UAE Team L'Imad | Katarzyna Niewiadoma-Phinney |

== Classification standings ==
Legend
| Denotes the winner of the general classification | Denotes the winner of the mountains classification |
| Denotes the winner of the points classification | Denotes the winner of the young rider classification |
| Denotes the winner of the team classification | Denotes the winner of the combativity award |

=== General classification ===
Final general classification (1–10)
| Rank | Rider | Team | Time |
|---|---|---|---|
| 1 | Demi Vollering (NED) | FDJ United–Suez | 30h 54' 51" |
| 2 | Katarzyna Niewiadoma-Phinney (POL) | Canyon//SRAM | + 1' 18" |
| 3 | Elisa Longo Borghini (ITA) | UAE Team L'Imad | + 4' 19" |
| 4 | Antonia Niedermaier (GER) | Canyon//SRAM | + 5' 10" |
| 5 | Paula Blasi (ESP) | UAE Team L'Imad | + 6' 13" |
| 6 | Cédrine Kerbaol (FRA) | EF Education–Oatly | + 6' 41" |
| 7 | Dominika Włodarczyk (POL) | UAE Team L'Imad | + 7' 53" |
| 8 | Isabella Holmgren (CAN) | Lidl–Trek | + 9' 12" |
| 9 | Kimberley Le Court-Pienaar (MRI) | AG Insurance–Soudal | + 14' 04" |
| 10 | Niamh Fisher-Black (NZL) | Lidl–Trek | + 15' 14" |

=== Points classification ===
Final points classification (1–10)
| Rank | Rider | Team | Points |
|---|---|---|---|
| 1 | Lorena Wiebes (NED) | Team SD Worx–Protime | 181 |
| 2 | Demi Vollering (NED) | FDJ United–Suez | 152 |
| 3 | Lotte Kopecky (BEL) | Team SD Worx–Protime | 120 |
| 4 | Kimberley Le Court-Pienaar (MRI) | AG Insurance–Soudal | 107 |
| 5 | Katarzyna Niewiadoma-Phinney (POL) | Canyon//SRAM | 103 |
| 6 | Elisa Longo Borghini (ITA) | UAE Team L'Imad | 96 |
| 7 | Noemi Rüegg (SUI) | EF Education–Oatly | 94 |
| 8 | Cédrine Kerbaol (FRA) | EF Education–Oatly | 84 |
| 9 | Dominika Włodarczyk (POL) | UAE Team L'Imad | 78 |
| 10 | Marlen Reusser (SUI) | Movistar Team | 72 |

=== Mountains classification ===
Final mountains classification (1–10)
| Rank | Rider | Team | Points |
|---|---|---|---|
| 1 | Puck Pieterse (NED) | Fenix–Premier Tech | 55 |
| 2 | Demi Vollering (NED) | FDJ United–Suez | 30 |
| 3 | Katarzyna Niewiadoma-Phinney (POL) | Canyon//SRAM | 28 |
| 4 | Maëva Squiban (FRA) | UAE Team L'Imad | 19 |
| 5 | Paula Blasi (ESP) | UAE Team L'Imad | 14 |
| 6 | Elisa Longo Borghini (ITA) | UAE Team L'Imad | 13 |
| 7 | Sara Casasola (ITA) | Fenix–Premier Tech | 12 |
| 8 | Sigrid Ytterhus Haugset (NOR) | Uno-X Mobility | 11 |
| 9 | Antonia Niedermaier (GER) | Canyon//SRAM | 10 |
| 10 | Marlen Reusser (SUI) | Movistar Team | 10 |

=== Young rider classification ===
Final young rider classification (1–10)
| Rank | Rider | Team | Time |
|---|---|---|---|
| 1 | Antonia Niedermaier (GER) | Canyon//SRAM | 31h 00' 01" |
| 2 | Paula Blasi (ESP) | UAE Team L'Imad | + 1' 03" |
| 3 | Isabella Holmgren (CAN) | Lidl–Trek | + 4' 02" |
| 4 | Nienke Vinke (NED) | Team SD Worx–Protime | + 17' 46" |
| 5 | Célia Gery (FRA) | FDJ United–Suez | + 38' 58" |
| 6 | Solène Muller (FRA) | St. Michel–Preference Home–Auber93 | + 1h 06' 49" |
| 7 | Marion Bunel (FRA) | Visma–Lease a Bike | + 1h 08' 15" |
| 8 | Clémence Latimier (FRA) | Ma Petite Entreprise | + 1h 09' 55" |
| 9 | Titia Ryo (FRA) | Human Powered Health | + 1h 25' 17" |
| 10 | Zoe Bäckstedt (GBR) | Canyon//SRAM | + 1h 29' 05" |

=== Team classification ===
Final team classification (1–10)
| Rank | Team | Time |
|---|---|---|
| 1 | (United Arab Emirates) UAE Team L'Imad | 93h 02' 51" |
| 2 | (Germany) Lidl–Trek | + 48' 11" |
| 3 | (France) FDJ United–Suez | + 48' 26" |
| 4 | (United States) EF Education–Oatly | + 54' 24" |
| 5 | (Germany) Canyon//SRAM | + 1h 06' 35" |
| 6 | (Netherlands) Visma–Lease a Bike | + 1h 07' 11" |
| 7 | (Belgium) AG Insurance–Soudal | + 1h 44' 25" |
| 8 | (United States) Human Powered Health | + 1h 52' 59" |
| 9 | (Netherlands) Team SD Worx–Protime | + 2h 06' 11" |
| 10 | (France) Ma Petite Entreprise | + 2h 41' 18" |

== Reaction ==
Media praised the race, with The Independent calling the Tour "dramatic, cathartic, and magnified by moments of individual virtuosity", Velo stating that the race was the "most competitive Tour de France Femmes yet" and Cycling News stated that "in its fifth year of existence [the race] somehow just keeps getting better", calling it "one of the best, if not the best, editions [...] in terms of excitement, intrigue and competition".

Some media expressed that the race had been better than the men's Tour, with The Guardian stating that "in the era of Pogacar, it is the Tour de France Femmes that offers the most compelling racing". The Wall Street Journal commented that the "men’s Tour de France was kind of an anti-climactic snooze. [...] the Tour de France Femmes wasn’t snoozy in the least. It felt like a karate kick to the head: Nine days of thrilling racing that included multiple lead changes, the shocking disintegration of the defending champ, one of the greatest climbing performances in the sport’s history, and a fragile 8-second gap between the two leaders heading into the final day." There were several requests for the race to be made longer and have more live television coverage, with Kerbaol stating that "expanding it to two weeks would be a great step". Le Parisien reported that race director Marion Rousse was pushing both ASO and France Télévisions to cover more of the race live. Noting the week gap between the men's Tour, race director Marion Rousse stated that "the race now forms part of people's daily lives" and that the variety of stages enhanced the quality of the racing.

There was praise for Vollering, with L'Équipe calling her victory an "indisputable triumph" and The Independent stating "it was tour de force by the sport’s premier stage racer, the deserving first winner of a landmark second [Tour]". Cycling News noted that the next generation of riders demonstrated "standout performances", praising Gery, Niedermaier, Blasi, and Holmgren. Cyclist noted that Longo Borghini had demonstrated that she was the leader of the UAE Team L'Imad team, and that Niedermaier had "outshone [Blasi] on the biggest stage".

== Broadcasting ==
As with previous editions, live television coverage was provided by France Télévisions in conjunction with the European Broadcasting Union. At least two and a half hours of each stage was broadcast live, with stages 5 and 9 shown from start to finish.

In France, France 2 reported that 3.5 million viewers watched the final stage to Nice, and a peak of 5.1 million viewers watched stage 7 to Mont Ventoux. An average of 2.6 million viewers watched the race during the week, slightly less than in 2025 – however the share of the total audience increased to 32.9%. In the Netherlands, NOS reported that the Ventoux stage had more viewers than all but two stages of the men's race. In Australia, SBS reported a total TV reach of 1.5 million viewers on stage 9.
