= 2025 Tour de Romandie Féminin =

2025 UCI Women's World Tour, race 23 of 27

Race details
- Dates: 15-17 August 2025
- Stages: 3
- Distance: 249.7 km (155.2 mi)
- Winning time: 6h 53' 02"

Results
| Jersey awarded to the overall winner | Winner | Elise Chabbey (SUI) | (FDJ–Suez) |
| | Second | Urška Žigart (SLO) | (AG Insurance–Soudal) |
| | Third | Yara Kastelijn (NED) | (Fenix–Deceuninck) |
| Jersey awarded to the points classification winner | Points | Paula Blasi (ESP) | (UAE Team ADQ) |
| Jersey awarded to the mountains classification winner | Mountains | Claire Steels (GBR) | (Movistar Team) |
| Jersey awarded to the youth classification winner | Youth | Paula Blasi (ESP) | (UAE Team ADQ) |
| | Team | (Belgium) AG Insurance–Soudal | |

The 2025 Tour de Romandie Féminin was the 4th edition of the Tour de Romandie Féminin road cycling stage race, which was part of the 2025 UCI Women's World Tour. It began on 15 August in Huémoz and finished on 17 August in Aigle.

The race was won by Swiss rider Elise Chabbey of FDJ–Suez. Five teams did not take part in the race, following a refusal to participate in a GPS tracking technology test.

== Teams ==
Fourteen UCI Women's WorldTeams and two UCI Women's Continental Teams made up the original sixteen teams scheduled to participate in the race. Before stage 1 commenced, UCI announced that five teams would not be taking part in the race due to a refusal to participate in a GPS tracking technology test.

UCI Women's WorldTeams

- AG Insurance–Soudal
- ~~Canyon//SRAM zondacrypto~~
- FDJ–Suez
- Fenix–Deceuninck
- ~~Lidl–Trek~~
- Movistar Team
- Liv AlUla Jayco
- Roland Le Dévoluy
- ~~Team Picnic–PostNL~~
- Team SD Worx–Protime
- UAE Team ADQ
- Uno-X Mobility
- ~~Visma–Lease a Bike~~
- VolkerWessels Cycling Team

UCI Continental Teams

- ~~EF Education–Oatly~~
- NEXETIS

== Route ==
Stage characteristics and winners
| Stage | Date | Course | Distance | Type | Stage winner |
|---|---|---|---|---|---|
| 1 | 15 August | Huémoz to Villars-sur-Ollon | 4.4 km (2.7 mi) | Mountain stage | Paula Blasi (ESP) |
| 2 | 16 August | Conthey to La Tzoumaz | 123.2 km (76.6 mi) | Mountain stage | Elise Chabbey (SUI) |
| 3 | 17 August | Aigle to Aigle | 122.1 km (75.9 mi) | Hilly stage | Blanka Vas (HUN) |
| Total | | | 249.7 km (155.2 mi) | | |

== Stages ==
=== Stage 1 ===
15 August — Huémoz to Villars-sur-Ollon, 4.4 km (2.7 mi)

Stage 1 Result
| Rank | Rider | Team | Time |
|---|---|---|---|
| 1 | Paula Blasi (ESP) | UAE Team ADQ | 11' 17.69" |
| 2 | Urška Žigart (SLO) | AG Insurance–Soudal | + 17.06" |
| 3 | Juliette Labous (FRA) | FDJ–Suez | + 18.6" |
| 4 | Yara Kastelijn (NED) | Fenix–Deceuninck | + 25.27" |
| 5 | Erica Magnaldi (ITA) | UAE Team ADQ | + 27.99" |
| 6 | Steffi Häberlin (SUI) | Team SD Worx–Protime | + 29.42" |
| 7 | Mareille Meijering (NED) | Movistar Team | + 29.64" |
| 8 | Alena Ivanchenko | UAE Team ADQ | + 30.23" |
| 9 | Elise Chabbey (SUI) | FDJ–Suez | + 32.04" |
| 10 | Mikayla Harvey (NZL) | Team SD Worx–Protime | + 32.06" |

General classification after Stage 1
| Rank | Rider | Team | Time |
|---|---|---|---|
| 1 | Paula Blasi (ESP) | UAE Team ADQ | 11' 17" |
| 2 | Urška Žigart (SLO) | AG Insurance–Soudal | + 17" |
| 3 | Juliette Labous (FRA) | FDJ–Suez | + 18" |
| 4 | Yara Kastelijn (NED) | Fenix–Deceuninck | + 25" |
| 5 | Erica Magnaldi (ITA) | UAE Team ADQ | + 28" |
| 6 | Steffi Häberlin (SUI) | Team SD Worx–Protime | + 30" |
| 7 | Mareille Meijering (NED) | Movistar Team | + 30" |
| 8 | Alena Ivanchenko | UAE Team ADQ | + 30" |
| 9 | Elise Chabbey (SUI) | FDJ–Suez | + 32" |
| 10 | Mikayla Harvey (NZL) | Team SD Worx–Protime | + 32" |

=== Stage 2 ===
16 August — Conthey to La Tzoumaz, 123.2 km (76.6 mi)

Stage 2 Result
| Rank | Rider | Team | Time |
|---|---|---|---|
| 1 | Elise Chabbey (SUI) | FDJ–Suez | 3h 29' 52" |
| 2 | Urška Žigart (SLO) | AG Insurance–Soudal | + 3" |
| 3 | Yara Kastelijn (NED) | Fenix–Deceuninck | + 6" |
| 4 | Mireia Benito (ESP) | AG Insurance–Soudal | + 1' 02" |
| 5 | Steffi Häberlin (SUI) | Team SD Worx–Protime | + 1' 10" |
| 6 | Paula Blasi (ESP) | UAE Team ADQ | + 1' 12" |
| 7 | Ella Wyllie (NZL) | Liv AlUla Jayco | + 1' 31" |
| 8 | Juliette Labous (FRA) | FDJ–Suez | + 1' 34" |
| 9 | Ginia Caluori (SUI) | NEXETIS | + 1' 38" |
| 10 | Erica Magnaldi (ITA) | UAE Team ADQ | + 2' 07" |

General classification after Stage 2
| Rank | Rider | Team | Time |
|---|---|---|---|
| 1 | Urška Žigart (SLO) | AG Insurance–Soudal | 3h 41' 23" |
| 2 | Elise Chabbey (SUI) | FDJ–Suez | + 8" |
| 3 | Yara Kastelijn (NED) | Fenix–Deceuninck | + 13" |
| 4 | Paula Blasi (ESP) | UAE Team ADQ | + 58" |
| 5 | Steffi Häberlin (SUI) | Team SD Worx–Protime | + 1' 26" |
| 6 | Mireia Benito (ESP) | AG Insurance–Soudal | + 1' 30" |
| 7 | Juliette Labous (FRA) | FDJ–Suez | + 1' 39" |
| 8 | Ella Wyllie (NZL) | Liv AlUla Jayco | + 2' 08" |
| 9 | Ginia Caluori (SUI) | NEXETIS | + 2' 16" |
| 10 | Erica Magnaldi (ITA) | UAE Team ADQ | + 2' 21" |

=== Stage 3 ===
17 August — Aigle to Aigle, 122.1 km (75.9 mi)

Stage 3 Result
| Rank | Rider | Team | Time |
|---|---|---|---|
| 1 | Blanka Vas (HUN) | Team SD Worx–Protime | 3h 11' 35" |
| 2 | Paula Blasi (ESP) | UAE Team ADQ | s.t. |
| 3 | Elise Chabbey (SUI) | FDJ–Suez | s.t. |
| 4 | Steffi Häberlin (SUI) | Team SD Worx–Protime | + 11" |
| 5 | Caroline Andersson (SWE) | Liv AlUla Jayco | s.t. |
| 6 | Yara Kastelijn (NED) | Fenix–Deceuninck | s.t. |
| 7 | Paula Patiño (COL) | Movistar Team | s.t. |
| 8 | Mischa Bredewold (NED) | Team SD Worx–Protime | s.t. |
| 9 | Erica Magnaldi (ITA) | UAE Team ADQ | s.t. |
| 10 | Urška Žigart (SLO) | AG Insurance–Soudal | s.t. |

General classification after Stage 3
| Rank | Rider | Team | Time |
|---|---|---|---|
| 1 | Elise Chabbey (SUI) | FDJ–Suez | 6h 53' 02" |
| 2 | Urška Žigart (SLO) | AG Insurance–Soudal | + 7" |
| 3 | Yara Kastelijn (NED) | Fenix–Deceuninck | + 20" |
| 4 | Paula Blasi (ESP) | UAE Team ADQ | + 48" |
| 5 | Steffi Häberlin (SUI) | Team SD Worx–Protime | + 1' 33" |
| 6 | Mireia Benito (ESP) | AG Insurance–Soudal | + 1' 37" |
| 7 | Juliette Labous (FRA) | FDJ–Suez | + 1' 46" |
| 8 | Ella Wyllie (NZL) | Liv AlUla Jayco | + 2' 15" |
| 9 | Ginia Caluori (SUI) | NEXETIS | + 2' 23" |
| 10 | Erica Magnaldi (ITA) | UAE Team ADQ | + 2' 28" |

== Classification leadership table ==
Classification leadership by stage
| Stage | Winner | General classification | Points classification | Mountains classification | Young rider classification | Team classification |
|---|---|---|---|---|---|---|
| 1 | Paula Blasi | Paula Blasi | Paula Blasi | Paula Blasi | Paula Blasi | UAE Team ADQ |
| 2 | Elise Chabbey | Urška Žigart | Urška Žigart | Urška Žigart | Paula Blasi | AG Insurance–Soudal |
| 3 | Blanka Vas | Elise Chabbey | Paula Blasi | Claire Steels | Paula Blasi | AG Insurance–Soudal |
| Final | | Elise Chabbey | Paula Blasi | Claire Steels | Paula Blasi | AG Insurance - Soudal Team |

== Classification standings ==
Legend
| Denotes the winner of the general classification | Denotes the winner of the mountains classification |
| Denotes the winner of the points classification | Denotes the winner of the young rider classification |

=== General classification ===
Final general classification (1–10)
| Rank | Rider | Team | Time |
|---|---|---|---|
| 1 | Elise Chabbey (SUI) | FDJ–Suez | 6h 53' 02" |
| 2 | Urška Žigart (SLO) | AG Insurance–Soudal | + 7" |
| 3 | Yara Kastelijn (NED) | Fenix–Deceuninck | + 20" |
| 4 | Paula Blasi (ESP) | UAE Team ADQ | + 48" |
| 5 | Steffi Häberlin (SUI) | Team SD Worx–Protime | + 1' 33" |
| 6 | Mireia Benito (ESP) | AG Insurance–Soudal | + 1' 37" |
| 7 | Juliette Labous (FRA) | FDJ–Suez | + 1' 46" |
| 8 | Ella Wyllie (NZL) | Liv AlUla Jayco | + 2' 15" |
| 9 | Ginia Caluori (SUI) | NEXETIS | + 2' 23" |
| 10 | Erica Magnaldi (ITA) | UAE Team ADQ | + 2' 28" |

=== Points classification ===
Final points classification (1–10)
| Rank | Rider | Team | Points |
|---|---|---|---|
| 1 | Paula Blasi (ESP) | UAE Team ADQ | 75 |
| 2 | Claire Steels (GBR) | Movistar Team | 75 |
| 3 | Elise Chabbey (SUI) | FDJ–Suez | 59 |
| 4 | Urška Žigart (SLO) | AG Insurance–Soudal | 57 |
| 5 | Yara Kastelijn (NED) | Fenix–Deceuninck | 55 |
| 6 | Blanka Vas (HUN) | Team SD Worx–Protime | 50 |
| 7 | Steffi Häberlin (SUI) | Team SD Worx–Protime | 50 |
| 8 | Juliette Labous (FRA) | FDJ–Suez | 39 |
| 9 | Erica Magnaldi (ITA) | UAE Team ADQ | 32 |
| 10 | Mireia Benito (ESP) | AG Insurance–Soudal | 28 |

=== Mountains classification ===
Final mountains classification (1–10)
| Rank | Rider | Team | Points |
|---|---|---|---|
| 1 | Claire Steels (GBR) | Movistar Team | 24 |
| 2 | Urška Žigart (SLO) | AG Insurance–Soudal | 19 |
| 3 | Yara Kastelijn (NED) | Fenix–Deceuninck | 17 |
| 4 | Morgane Coston (FRA) | Roland Le Dévoluy | 15 |
| 5 | Paula Blasi (ESP) | UAE Team ADQ | 13 |
| 6 | Elise Chabbey (SUI) | FDJ–Suez | 13 |
| 7 | Laura Stigger (AUT) | Team SD Worx–Protime | 7 |
| 8 | Ashleigh Moolman (RSA) | AG Insurance–Soudal | 6 |
| 9 | Steffi Häberlin (SUI) | Team SD Worx–Protime | 4 |
| 10 | Juliette Labous (FRA) | FDJ–Suez | 4 |

=== Young rider classification ===
Final young rider classification (1–10)
| Rank | Rider | Team | Time |
|---|---|---|---|
| 1 | Paula Blasi (ESP) | UAE Team ADQ | 6h 53' 50" |
| 2 | Ella Wyllie (NZL) | Liv AlUla Jayco | + 1' 27" |
| 3 | Ginia Caluori (SUI) | NEXETIS | + 1' 35" |
| 4 | Caroline Andersson (SWE) | Liv AlUla Jayco | + 3' 31" |
| 5 | Petra Stiasny (SUI) | Roland Le Dévoluy | + 4' 39" |
| 6 | Laura Molenaar (NED) | VolkerWessels Cycling Team | + 6' 12" |
| 7 | Solbjørk Minke Anderson (DEN) | Uno-X Mobility | + 6' 37" |
| 8 | Alena Ivanchenko (25x17px) | UAE Team ADQ | + 8' 07" |
| 9 | Jasmin Liechti (SUI) | NEXETIS | + 8' 08" |
| 10 | Lea Huber (SUI) | NEXETIS | + 10' 48" |

=== Team classification ===
Final team classification (1–10)
| Rank | Team | Time |
|---|---|---|
| 1 | (Belgium) AG Insurance–Soudal | 20h 48' 15" |
| 2 | (France) FDJ–Suez | + 2' 24" |
| 3 | (Australia) Liv AlUla Jayco | + 2' 49" |
| 4 | (United Arab Emirates) UAE Team ADQ | + 3' 08" |
| 5 | (Netherlands) Team SD Worx–Protime | + 5' 05" |
| 6 | (Spain) Movistar Team | + 13' 37" |
| 7 | (Switzerland) NEXETIS | + 13' 46" |
| 8 | (Netherlands) VolkerWessels Cycling Team | + 17' 23" |
| 9 | (Switzerland) Roland Le Dévoluy | + 21' 28" |
| 10 | (Belgium) Fenix–Deceuninck | + 30' 01" |
