= 2026 Tour of Britain Women =

2026 UCI Women's World Tour, race 23 of 27
- Podium, with overall winner Kimberley Le Court-Pienaar in centre

Race details
- Dates: 19–23 August 2025
- Stages: 5
- Distance: 636.2 km (395.3 mi)
- Winning time: 17h 02' 04"

Results
| Jersey awarded to the overall winner | Winner | Kim Le Court-Pienaar (MRI) | (AG Insurance–Soudal) |
| | Second | Lorena Wiebes (NED) | (Team SD Worx–Protime) |
| | Third | Liane Lippert (GER) | (Movistar Team) |
| Jersey awarded to the points classification winner | Points | Lorena Wiebes (NED) | (Team SD Worx–Protime) |
| Jersey awarded to the mountains classification winner | Mountains | Lauren Dickson (GBR) | (FDJ United–Suez) |
| Jersey awarded to the young rider classification winner | Young rider | Fleur Moors (BEL) | (Lidl–Trek) |
| | Team | (Germany) Lidl–Trek | |

The 2026 Tour of Britain Women was a British women's cycle stage race held in Great Britain as part of the UCI Women's World Tour. It took place between 19 and 23 August, the race was the eleventh edition of the Tour of Britain Women (named the Women's Tour prior to 2024). This edition mostly took place in North West England and Wales, with the final stage taking place in the Midlands.

The race was won by Mauritian rider Kimberley Le Court-Pienaar of AG Insurance–Soudal by nineteen seconds ahead of Dutch rider Lorena Wiebes of Team SD Worx–Protime, after Le Court-Pienaar won the queen stage to the Great Orme on stage 3 by 13 seconds. Wiebes also took the points classification, having won four of the five stages in sprint finishes. Third overall was German rider Liane Lippert of Movistar Team, who gained time by finishing 2nd behind Le Court-Pienaar on stage 3. British rider Lauren Dickson of FDJ United–Suez won the mountains classification. The young rider classification was won by Belgian rider Fleur Moors of Lidl–Trek. Lidl–Trek also won the team competition.

== Teams ==
Nineteen teams took part: thirteen UCI Women's WorldTeams, five UCI Women's Continental Teams and the Great Britain national team.

UCI Women's WorldTeams

- AG Insurance–Soudal
- Canyon//SRAM
- Fenix–Premier Tech
- FDJ United–Suez
- Human Powered Health
- Lidl–Trek
- Liv AlUla Jayco
- Movistar Team
- Team Picnic–PostNL
- Team SD Worx–Protime
- Visma–Lease a Bike
- UAE Team L'Imad
- Uno-X Mobility

UCI Women's Continental Teams

- DAS–Hutchinson
- Handsling Alba Development Road Team
- Hitec Products–Fluid Control
- O'Shea Redchilli Bikes
- Smurfit Westrock Cycling Team

National Teams

- Great Britain

== Route and stages ==
The host venues were in June 2026. Cockermouth hosted the start and finish for the first stage which took the riders in a loop around Cumbria. The second stage headed to Lancashire while the following two stages took place in North and Mid Wales. The final stage happened in Warwickshire in the Midlands.

Stage characteristics
| Stage | Date | Course | Distance | Type | Stage winner |
|---|---|---|---|---|---|
| 1 | 19 August | Cockermouth to Cockermouth | 158.9 km (98.7 mi) | Hilly stage | Lorena Wiebes (NED) |
| 2 | 20 August | Clitheroe to Blackpool | 110.5 km (68.7 mi) | Hilly stage | Lorena Wiebes (NED) |
| 3 | 21 August | Mold to The Great Orme | 104.7 km (65.1 mi) | Hilly stage | Kim Le Court-Pienaar (MRI) |
| 4 | 22 August | Llanidloes to Hay-on-Wye | 138.3 km (85.9 mi) | Hilly stage | Lorena Wiebes (NED) |
| 5 | 23 August | Royal Leamington Spa to Royal Leamington Spa | 123.8 km (76.9 mi) | Hilly stage | Lorena Wiebes (NED) |
| Total | | | 437.7 km (272.0 mi) | | |

== Stages ==
=== Stage 1 ===
19 August 2026 — Cockermouth to Cockermouth, 158.9 km (98.7 mi)

Stage 1 Result
| Rank | Rider | Team | Time |
|---|---|---|---|
| 1 | Lorena Wiebes (NED) | Team SD Worx–Protime | 4h 03' 09" |
| 2 | Chiara Consonni (ITA) | Canyon//SRAM | + 0" |
| 3 | Josie Nelson (GBR) | Team Picnic–PostNL | + 0" |
| 4 | Quinty Ton (NED) | Liv AlUla Jayco | + 0" |
| 5 | Caroline Andersson (SWE) | Liv AlUla Jayco | + 0" |
| 6 | Letizia Borghesi (ITA) | AG Insurance–Soudal | + 0" |
| 7 | Karlijn Swinkels (NED) | UAE Team L'Imad | + 0" |
| 8 | Liane Lippert (GER) | Movistar Team | + 0" |
| 9 | Mischa Bredewold (NED) | Team SD Worx–Protime | + 0" |
| 10 | Fleur Moors (BEL) | Lidl–Trek | + 0" |

General classification after Stage 1
| Rank | Rider | Team | Time |
|---|---|---|---|
| 1 | Lorena Wiebes (NED) | Team SD Worx–Protime | 4h 02' 59" |
| 2 | Chiara Consonni (ITA) | Canyon//SRAM | +4" |
| 3 | Karlijn Swinkels (NED) | UAE Team L'Imad | + 5" |
| 4 | Josie Nelson (GBR) | Team Picnic–PostNL | + 6" |
| 5 | Mischa Bredewold (NED) | Team SD Worx–Protime | + 7" |
| 6 | Kim Le Court-Pienaar (MRI) | AG Insurance–Soudal | + 8" |
| 7 | Quinty Ton (NED) | Liv AlUla Jayco | + 10" |
| 8 | Caroline Andersson (SWE) | Liv AlUla Jayco | + 10" |
| 9 | Letizia Borghesi (ITA) | AG Insurance–Soudal | + 10" |
| 10 | Liane Lippert (GER) | Movistar Team | + 10" |

=== Stage 2 ===
20 August 2026 — Clitheroe to Blackpool, 110.5 km (68.7 mi)

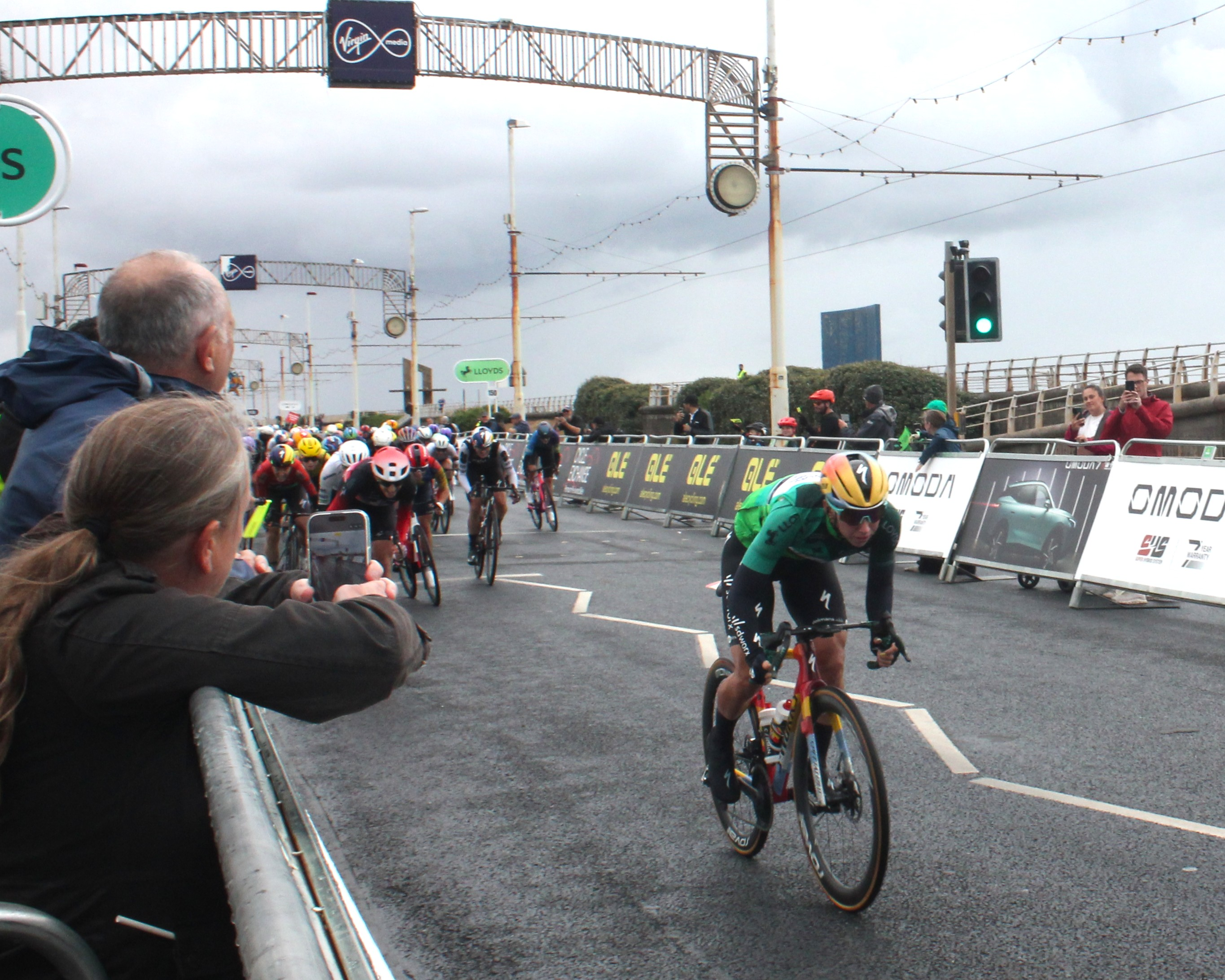
Lorena Wiebes (Team SD Worx–Protime) sprinting towards the finish line in Blackpool

Stage 2 Result
| Rank | Rider | Team | Time |
|---|---|---|---|
| 1 | Lorena Wiebes (NED) | Team SD Worx–Protime | 3h 29' 26" |
| 2 | Maggie Coles-Lyster (CAN) | Human Powered Health | + 0" |
| 3 | Kim Le Court-Pienaar (MRI) | AG Insurance–Soudal | + 0" |
| 4 | Nienke Veenhoven (NED) | Visma–Lease a Bike | + 0" |
| 5 | Lara Gillespie (IRE) | UAE Team L'Imad | + 0" |
| 6 | Chiara Consonni (ITA) | Canyon//SRAM | + 0" |
| 7 | Clara Copponi (FRA) | Lidl–Trek | + 0" |
| 8 | Teuntje Beekhuis (NED) | Uno-X Mobility | + 0" |
| 9 | Ally Wollaston (NZ) | FDJ United–Suez | + 0" |
| 10 | Juliana Londoño (COL) | Team Picnic–PostNL | + 0" |

General classification after Stage 2
| Rank | Rider | Team | Time |
|---|---|---|---|
| 1 | Lorena Wiebes (NED) | Team SD Worx–Protime | 7h 32' 15" |
| 2 | Chiara Consonni (ITA) | Canyon//SRAM | +14" |
| 3 | Kim Le Court-Pienaar (MRI) | AG Insurance–Soudal | + 14" |
| 4 | Karlijn Swinkels (NED) | UAE Team L'Imad | + 15" |
| 5 | Josie Nelson (GBR) | Team Picnic–PostNL | + 16" |
| 6 | Mischa Bredewold (NED) | Team SD Worx–Protime | + 17" |
| 7 | Fleur Moors (BEL) | Lidl–Trek | + 20" |
| 8 | Juliana Londoño (COL) | Team Picnic–PostNL | + 20" |
| 9 | Liane Lippert (GER) | Movistar Team | + 20" |
| 10 | Anna Morris (GBR) | AG Insurance–Soudal | + 20" |

=== Stage 3 ===
21 August 2026 — Mold to The Great Orme, 104.7 km (65.1 mi)

Peloton passing through Trefriw on stage 3

Stage 3 Result
| Rank | Rider | Team | Time |
|---|---|---|---|
| 1 | Kim Le Court-Pienaar (MRI) | AG Insurance–Soudal | 2h 46' 10" |
| 2 | Liane Lippert (GER) | Movistar Team | + 13" |
| 3 | Caroline Andersson (SWE) | Liv AlUla Jayco | + 20" |
| 4 | Femke de Vries (NED) | Visma–Lease a Bike | + 21" |
| 5 | Cecilie Uttrup Ludwig (DEN) | Canyon//SRAM | + 23" |
| 6 | Lauren Dickson (GBR) | FDJ United–Suez | + 26" |
| 7 | Mischa Bredewold (NED) | Team SD Worx–Protime | + 28" |
| 8 | Karlijn Swinkels (NED) | UAE Team L'Imad | + 28" |
| 9 | Eleonora Gasparrini (ITA) | UAE Team L'Imad | + 32" |
| 10 | Lorena Wiebes (NED) | Team SD Worx–Protime | + 37" |

General classification after Stage 3
| Rank | Rider | Team | Time |
|---|---|---|---|
| 1 | Kim Le Court-Pienaar (MRI) | AG Insurance–Soudal | 10h 18' 26" |
| 2 | Liane Lippert (GER) | Movistar Team | + 26" |
| 3 | Lorena Wiebes (NED) | Team SD Worx–Protime | +35" |
| 4 | Caroline Andersson (SWE) | Liv AlUla Jayco | +35" |
| 5 | Femke de Vries (NED) | Visma–Lease a Bike | + 40" |
| 6 | Karlijn Swinkels (NED) | UAE Team L'Imad | + 42" |
| 7 | Mischa Bredewold (NED) | Team SD Worx–Protime | + 42" |
| 8 | Cecilie Uttrup Ludwig (DEN) | Canyon//SRAM | + 42" |
| 9 | Lauren Dickson (GBR) | FDJ United–Suez | + 45" |
| 10 | Eleonora Gasparrini (ITA) | UAE Team L'Imad | + 51" |

=== Stage 4 ===
22 August 2026 — Llanidloes to Hay-on-Wye, 138.3 km (85.9 mi)

Stage 4 Result
| Rank | Rider | Team | Time |
|---|---|---|---|
| 1 | Lorena Wiebes (NED) | Team SD Worx–Protime | 3h 41' 13" |
| 2 | Liane Lippert (GER) | Movistar Team | + 0" |
| 3 | Kim Le Court-Pienaar (MRI) | AG Insurance–Soudal | + 0" |
| 4 | Kate Courtney (USA) | FDJ United–Suez | + 0" |
| 5 | Pfeiffer Georgi (GBR) | Team Picnic–PostNL | + 0" |
| 6 | Karlijn Swinkels (NED) | UAE Team L'Imad | + 0" |
| 7 | Femke de Vries (NED) | Visma–Lease a Bike | + 0" |
| 8 | Millie Couzens (GBR) | Fenix–Premier Tech | + 0" |
| 9 | Fleur Moors (BEL) | Lidl–Trek | + 0" |
| 10 | Josie Talbot (AUS) | Liv AlUla Jayco | + 0" |

General classification after Stage 4
| Rank | Rider | Team | Time |
|---|---|---|---|
| 1 | Kim Le Court-Pienaar (MRI) | AG Insurance–Soudal | 13h 59' 35" |
| 2 | Liane Lippert (GER) | Movistar Team | + 24" |
| 3 | Lorena Wiebes (NED) | Team SD Worx–Protime | +29" |
| 4 | Caroline Andersson (SWE) | Liv AlUla Jayco | +39" |
| 5 | Femke de Vries (NED) | Visma–Lease a Bike | + 44" |
| 6 | Karlijn Swinkels (NED) | UAE Team L'Imad | + 46" |
| 7 | Mischa Bredewold (NED) | Team SD Worx–Protime | + 46" |
| 8 | Cecilie Uttrup Ludwig (DEN) | Canyon//SRAM | + 46" |
| 9 | Josie Nelson (GBR) | Team Picnic–PostNL | + 56" |
| 10 | Riejanne Markus (NED) | Lidl–Trek | + 1' 06" |

=== Stage 5 ===
23 August 2026 — Royal Leamington Spa to Royal Leamington Spa, 123.8 km (76.9 mi)

Stage 5 Result
| Rank | Rider | Team | Time |
|---|---|---|---|
| 1 | Lorena Wiebes (NED) | Team SD Worx–Protime | 3h 02' 29" |
| 2 | Lara Gillespie (IRE) | UAE Team L'Imad | + 0" |
| 3 | Chiara Consonni (ITA) | Canyon//SRAM | + 0" |
| 4 | Zoe Bäckstedt (GBR) | Canyon//SRAM | + 0" |
| 5 | Pfeiffer Georgi (GBR) | Team Picnic–PostNL | + 0" |
| 6 | Nienke Veenhoven (NED) | Visma–Lease a Bike | + 0" |
| 7 | Josie Nelson (GBR) | Team Picnic–PostNL | + 0" |
| 8 | Caroline Andersson (SWE) | Liv AlUla Jayco | + 0" |
| 9 | Millie Couzens (GBR) | Fenix–Premier Tech | + 0" |
| 10 | Maggie Coles-Lyster (CAN) | Human Powered Health | + 0" |

General classification after Stage 5
| Rank | Rider | Team | Time |
|---|---|---|---|
| 1 | Kim Le Court-Pienaar (MRI) | AG Insurance–Soudal | 17h 02' 04" |
| 2 | Lorena Wiebes (NED) | Team SD Worx–Protime | +19" |
| 3 | Liane Lippert (GER) | Movistar Team | + 24" |
| 4 | Caroline Andersson (SWE) | Liv AlUla Jayco | +39" |
| 5 | Femke de Vries (NED) | Visma–Lease a Bike | + 44" |
| 6 | Karlijn Swinkels (NED) | UAE Team L'Imad | + 46" |
| 7 | Mischa Bredewold (NED) | Team SD Worx–Protime | + 46" |
| 8 | Cecilie Uttrup Ludwig (DEN) | Canyon//SRAM | + 46" |
| 9 | Josie Nelson (GBR) | Team Picnic–PostNL | + 56" |
| 10 | Riejanne Markus (NED) | Lidl–Trek | + 1' 06" |

== Classification leadership table ==
Classification leadership by stage
| Stage | Winner | General classification | Points classification | Mountains classification | Young rider classification | Team classification | Combativity award |
|---|---|---|---|---|---|---|---|
| 1 | Lorena Wiebes | Lorena Wiebes | Lorena Wiebes | Audrey De Keersmaeker | Fleur Moors | Team SD Worx–Protime | Audrey De Keersmaeker |
| 2 | Lorena Wiebes | Lorena Wiebes | Lorena Wiebes | Steffi Häberlin | Fleur Moors | Team SD Worx–Protime | Katrine Aalerud |
| 3 | Kim Le Court-Pienaar | Kim Le Court-Pienaar | Kim Le Court-Pienaar | Lauren Dickson | Fleur Moors | Lidl–Trek | Kim Le Court-Pienaar |
| 4 | Lorena Wiebes | Kim Le Court-Pienaar | Lorena Wiebes | Lauren Dickson | Fleur Moors | Lidl–Trek | Fleur Moors |
| 5 | Lorena Wiebes | Kim Le Court-Pienaar | Lorena Wiebes | Lauren Dickson | Fleur Moors | Lidl–Trek | Alice Towers |
| Final | | Kim Le Court-Pienaar | Lorena Wiebes | Lauren Dickson | Fleur Moors | Lidl-Trek | Fleur Moors |

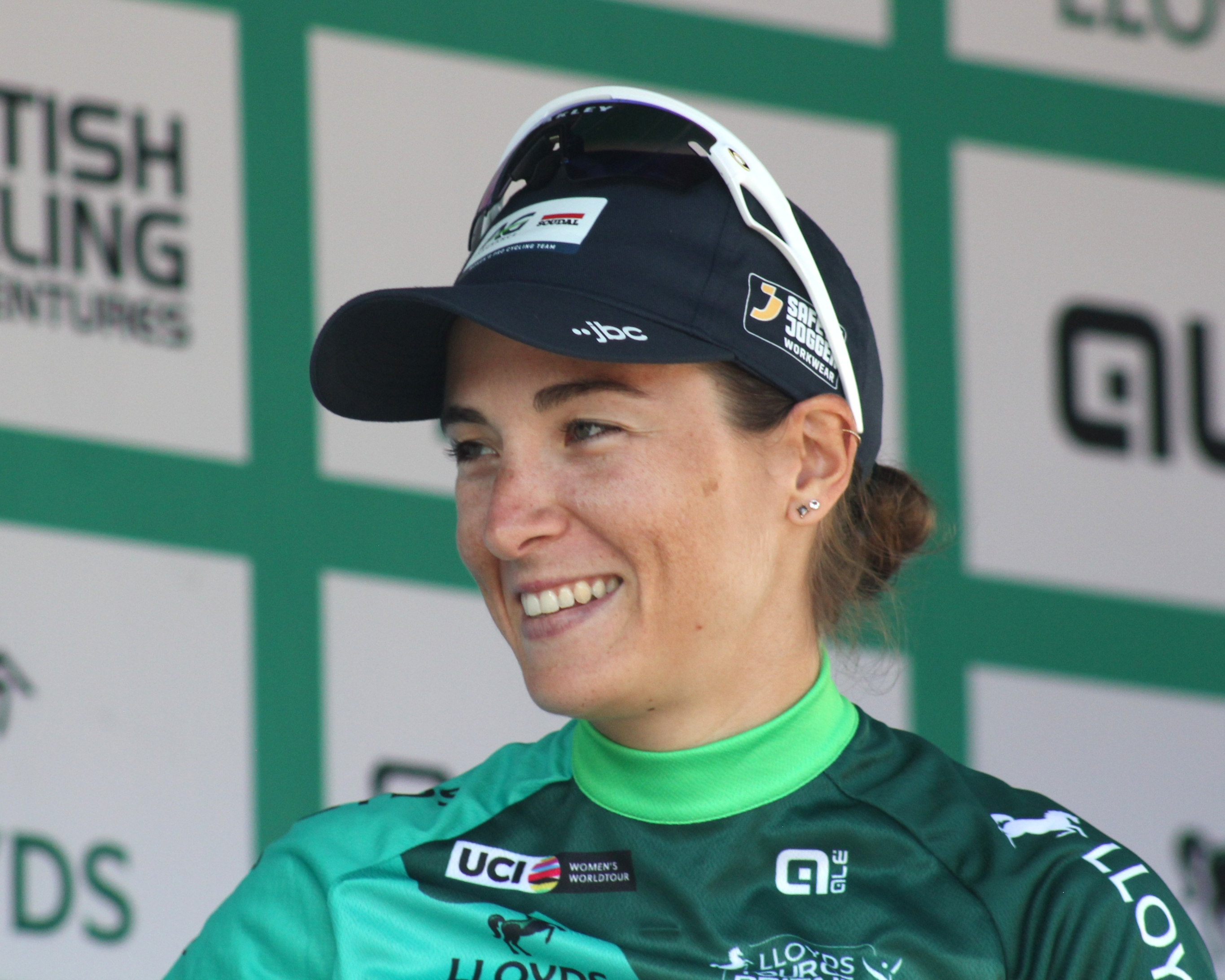
Kim Le Court
(General)

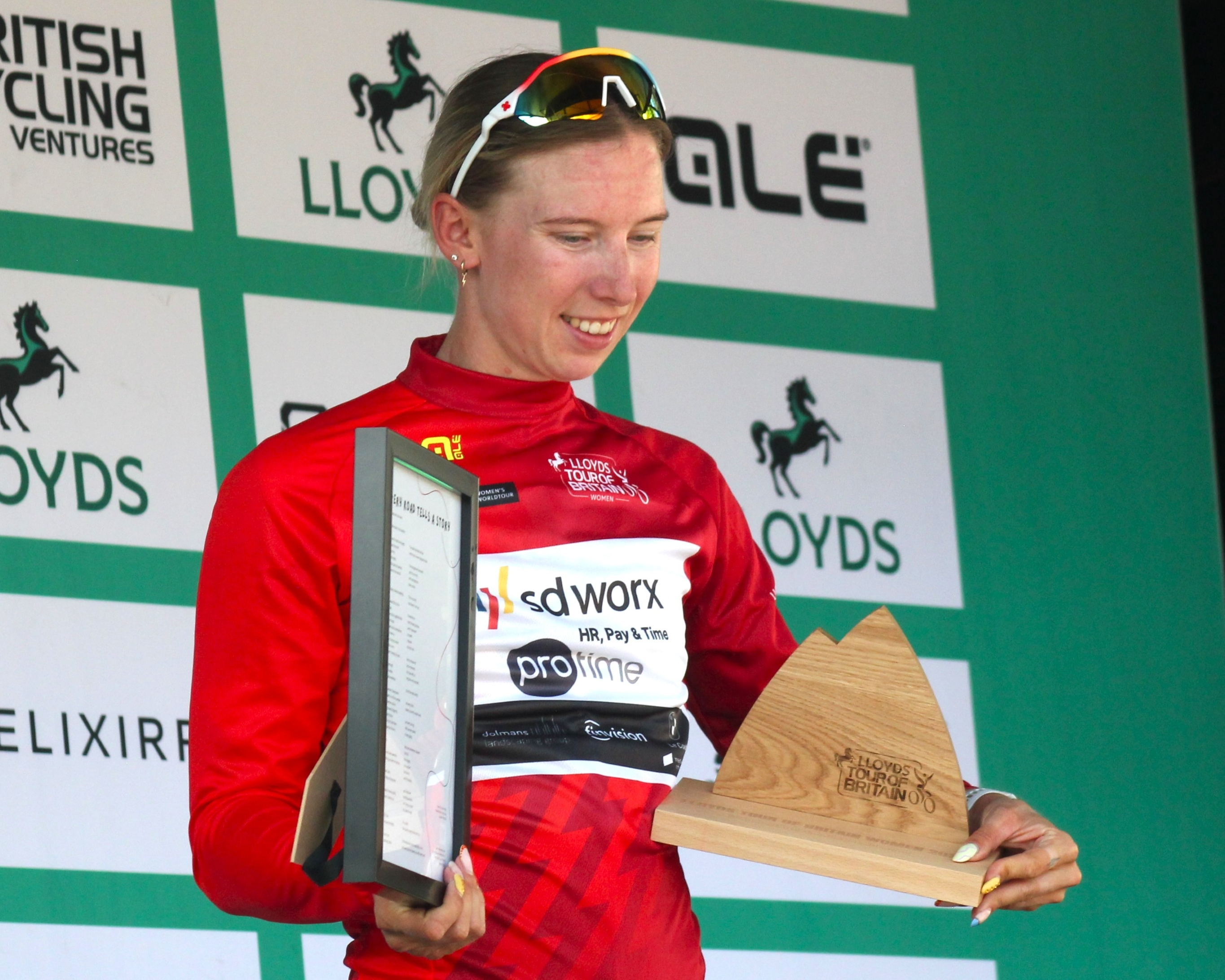
Lorena Wiebes
(Points)

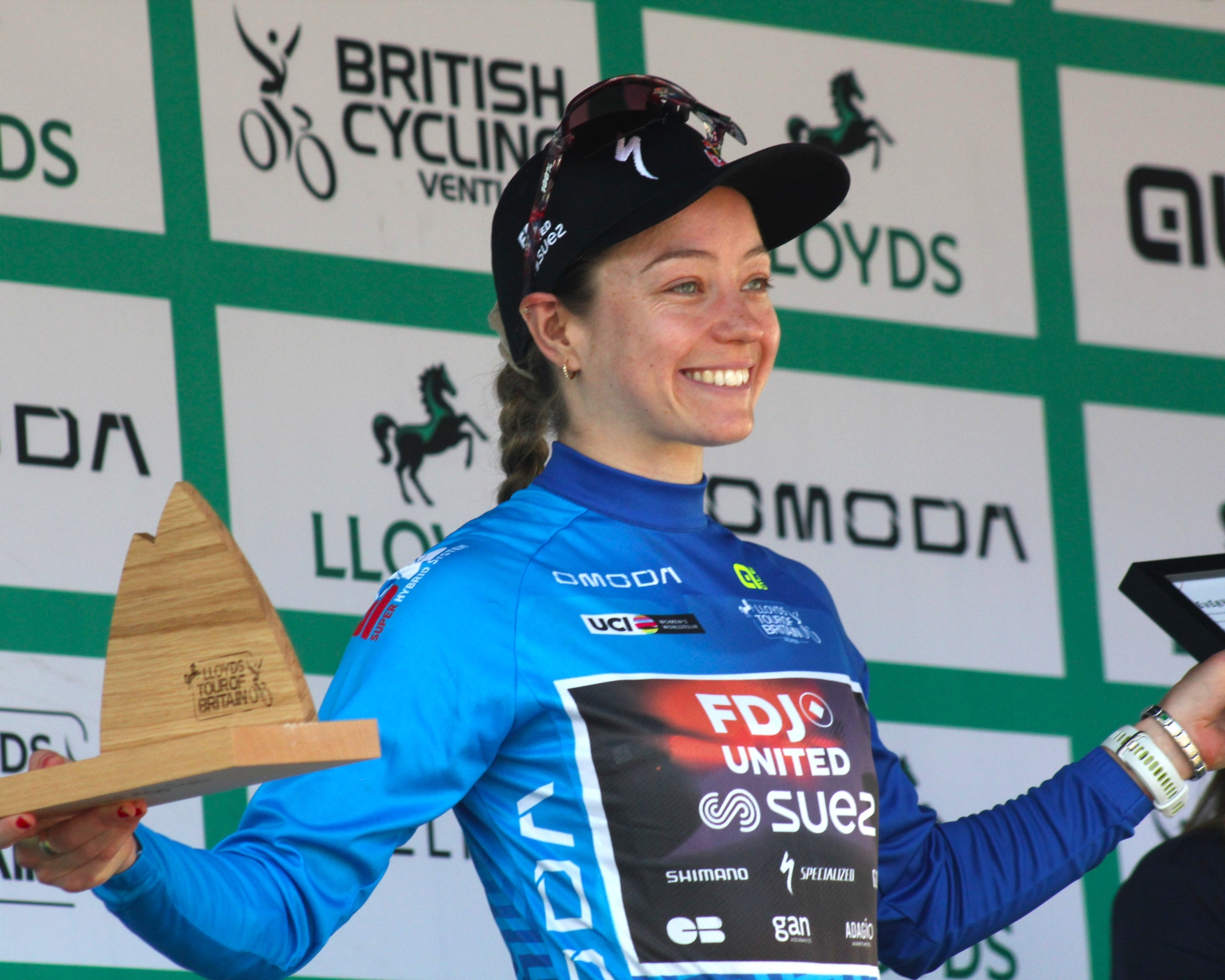
Lauren Dickson
(Mountains)

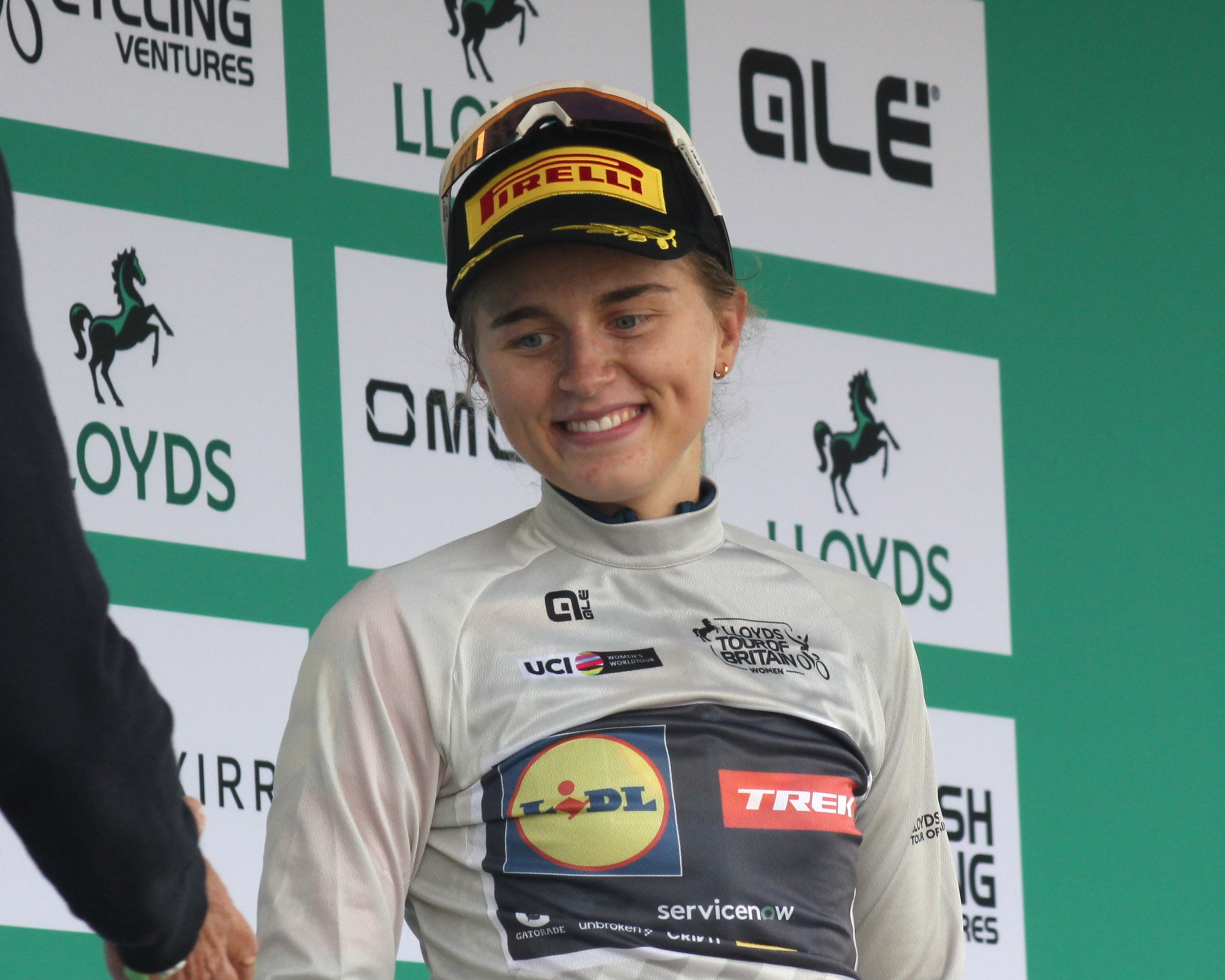
Fleur Moors
(Young rider, Combativity)

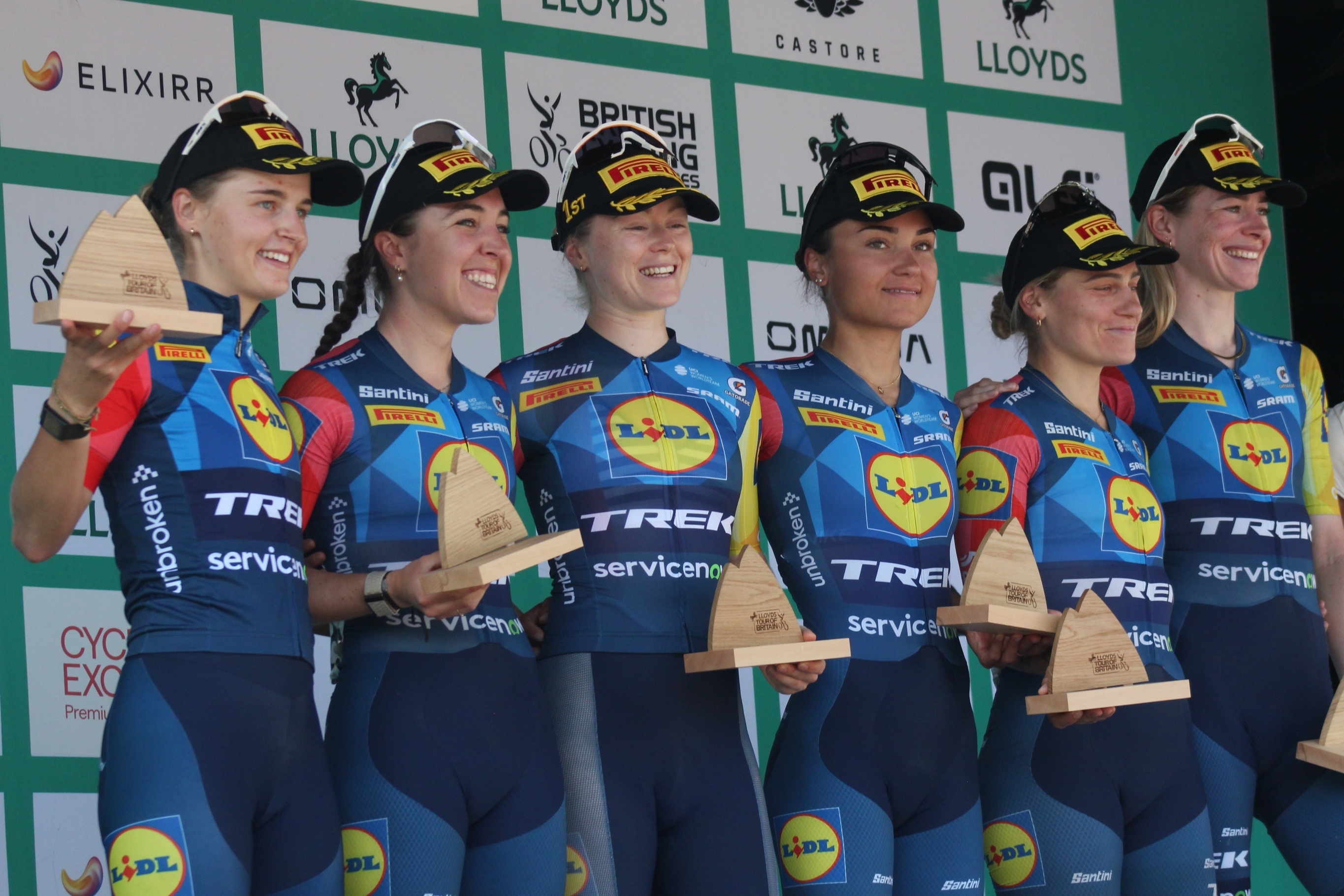
Lidl–Trek
(Team)

== Classification standings ==
Legend
| Denotes the winner of the general classification | Denotes the winner of the mountains classification |
| Denotes the winner of the points classification | Denotes the winner of the young rider classification |

=== General classification ===
Final general classification (1–10)
| Rank | Rider | Team | Time |
|---|---|---|---|
| 1 | Kim Le Court-Pienaar (MRI) | AG Insurance–Soudal | 17h 02' 04" |
| 2 | Lorena Wiebes (NED) | Team SD Worx–Protime | +19" |
| 3 | Liane Lippert (GER) | Movistar Team | + 24" |
| 4 | Caroline Andersson (SWE) | Liv AlUla Jayco | +39" |
| 5 | Femke de Vries (NED) | Visma–Lease a Bike | + 44" |
| 6 | Karlijn Swinkels (NED) | UAE Team L'Imad | + 46" |
| 7 | Mischa Bredewold (NED) | Team SD Worx–Protime | + 46" |
| 8 | Cecilie Uttrup Ludwig (DEN) | Canyon//SRAM | + 46" |
| 9 | Josie Nelson (GBR) | Team Picnic–PostNL | + 56" |
| 10 | Riejanne Markus (NED) | Lidl–Trek | + 1' 06" |

=== Points classification ===
Result
| Rank | Rider | Team | Points |
|---|---|---|---|
| 1 | Lorena Wiebes (NED) | Team SD Worx–Protime | 106 |
| 2 | Kim Le Court-Pienaar (MRI) | AG Insurance–Soudal | 69 |
| 3 | Liane Lippert (GER) | Movistar Team | 39 |
| 4 | Chiara Consonni (ITA) | Canyon//SRAM | 36 |
| 5 | Lara Gillespie (IRE) | UAE Team L'Imad | 31 |
| 6 | Karlijn Swinkels (NED) | UAE Team L'Imad | 29 |
| 7 | Mischa Bredewold (NED) | Team SD Worx–Protime | 23 |
| 8 | Maggie Coles-Lyster (CAN) | Human Powered Health | 22 |
| 9 | Caroline Andersson (SWE) | Liv AlUla Jayco | 21 |
| 10 | Josie Nelson (GBR) | Team Picnic–PostNL | 16 |

=== Mountains classification ===
Result
| Rank | Rider | Team | Points |
|---|---|---|---|
| 1 | Lauren Dickson (GBR) | FDJ United–Suez | 36 |
| 2 | Kim Le Court-Pienaar (MRI) | AG Insurance–Soudal | 27 |
| 3 | Kate Courtney (USA) | FDJ United–Suez | 21 |
| 4 | Fleur Moors (BEL) | Lidl–Trek | 19 |
| 5 | Eva van Agt (NED) | FDJ United–Suez | 16 |
| 6 | Mischa Bredewold (NED) | Team SD Worx–Protime | 16 |
| 7 | Liane Lippert (GER) | Movistar Team | 15 |
| 8 | Caroline Andersson (SWE) | Liv AlUla Jayco | 15 |
| 9 | Audrey De Keersmaeker (BEL) | Team Picnic–PostNL | 10 |
| 10 | Sara Martín (ESP) | Movistar Team | 10 |

=== Young rider classification ===
Result
| Rank | Rider | Team | Time |
|---|---|---|---|
| 1 | Fleur Moors (BEL) | Lidl–Trek | 17h 03' 18" |
| 2 | Juliana Londoño (COL) | Team Picnic–PostNL | + 8' 41" |
| 3 | Imogen Wolff (GBR) | Visma–Lease a Bike | + 10' 56" |
| 4 | Justyna Czapla (GER) | Canyon//SRAM | + 11' 11" |
| 5 | Julia Kopecký (CZE) | Team SD Worx–Protime | + 15' 44" |
| 6 | Morven Yeoman (GBR) | DAS–Hutchinson | + 16' 29" |
| 7 | Lucía Ruiz Pérez (ESP) | Movistar Team | + 17' 20" |
| 8 | Zoe Bäckstedt (GBR) | Canyon//SRAM | + 19' 30" |
| 9 | Oda Aune Gissinger (NOR) | Hitec Products–Fluid Control | + 24' 51" |
| 10 | Febe Jooris (BEL) | UAE Team L'Imad | + 26' 57" |

=== Team classification ===
Result
| Rank | Team | Time |
|---|---|---|
| 1 | (Germany) Lidl–Trek | 51h 09' 50" |
| 2 | (France) FDJ United–Suez | + 3' 58" |
| 3 | (United Arab Emirates) UAE Team ADQ | + 5' 00" |
| 4 | (Netherlands) Team Picnic–PostNL | + 5' 02" |
| 5 | (Spain) Movistar Team | + 7' 25" |
| 6 | (Norway) Uno-X Mobility | + 8' 58" |
| 7 | (Netherlands) Visma–Lease a Bike | + 10' 34" |
| 8 | (Netherlands) Team SD Worx–Protime | + 11' 34" |
| 9 | (Germany) Canyon//SRAM | + 17' 04" |
| 10 | (Australia) Liv AlUla Jayco | + 18' 37" |

== See also ==
- 2026 in women's road cycling
