= 2026 Amstel Gold Race (women's race) =

2026 Amstel Gold Race Ladies Edition
2026 UCI Women's World Tour, race 13 of 26

Race details
- Dates: 19 April 2026
- Stages: 1
- Distance: 158.1 km (98.2 mi)
- Winning time: 4h 02' 15"

Results
	Winner	Paula Blasi (ESP)	(UAE Team ADQ)
	Second	Katarzyna Niewiadoma-Phinney (POL)	(Canyon//SRAM Zondacrypto)
	Third	Demi Vollering (NED)	(FDJ United–Suez)

The 2026 Amstel Gold Race Ladies Edition was a Dutch road cycling one-day race that took place on 19 April 2026. It was the 12th edition of the Amstel Gold Race for women, and the 13th event of the 2026 UCI Women's World Tour.

The race was won by Spanish rider Paula Blasi of UAE Team ADQ in a solo victory, after a late attack on the Cauberg. It was Blasi's first victory in the UCI Women's World Tour.

== Teams ==
Twenty-one teams took part in the race. 14 Women's WorldTeams were joined by four UCI Women's ProTeams and three Women's continental teams.

UCI Women's WorldTeams

- AG Insurance–Soudal
- Canyon//SRAM Zondacrypto
- EF Education–Oatly
- FDJ United–Suez
- Fenix–Premier Tech
- Human Powered Health
- Lidl–Trek
- Liv AlUla Jayco
- Movistar Team
- Team Picnic–PostNL
- Team SD Worx–Protime
- UAE Team ADQ
- Uno-X Mobility
- Visma–Lease a Bike

UCI Women's ProTeams

- Lotto–Intermarché Ladies
- Mayenne Monbana My Pie
- St. Michel–Preference Home–Auber93
- VolkerWessels Cycling Team

UCI Women's Continental Teams

- Aromitalia Vaiano
- Citymesh–Customm Pro Cycling Team
- DAS–Hutchinson

== Result ==
Result
Rank	Rider	Team	Time
1	Paula Blasi (ESP)	UAE Team ADQ	4h 02' 15"
2	Katarzyna Niewiadoma-Phinney (POL)	Canyon//SRAM Zondacrypto	+ 27"
3	Demi Vollering (NED)	FDJ United–Suez	+ 27"
4	Letizia Paternoster (ITA)	Liv AlUla Jayco	+ 43"
5	Noemi Rüegg (SUI)	EF Education–Oatly	+ 43"
6	Karlijn Swinkels (NED)	UAE Team ADQ	+ 43"
7	Sarah Van Dam (CAN)	Visma–Lease a Bike	+ 43"
8	Riejanne Markus (NED)	Lidl–Trek	+ 43"
9	Anna van der Breggen (NED)	Team SD Worx–Protime	+ 43"
10	Puck Pieterse (NED)	Fenix–Premier Tech	+ 43"
