= 2025 Liège–Bastogne–Liège Femmes =

Cycling race

2025 UCI Women's World Tour, race 14 of 27

Race details
- Dates: 27 April 2025
- Stages: 1
- Distance: 152.9 km (95.0 mi)
- Winning time: 4h 15' 42"

Results
	Winner	Kimberley Le Court (MRI)	(AG Insurance–Soudal)
	Second	Puck Pieterse (NED)	(Fenix–Deceuninck)
	Third	Demi Vollering (NED)	(FDJ–Suez)

The 2025 Liège–Bastogne–Liège Femmes was a Belgian road cycling one-day race that took place on 27 April. It was the 9th edition of Liège–Bastogne–Liège Femmes and the 14th event of the 2025 UCI Women's World Tour. It was the finale of the Ardennes classics, following the Amstel Gold Race Ladies Edition and La Flèche Wallonne Femmes.

The race was won by Mauritian national champion Kimberley Le Court of AG Insurance–Soudal in a sprint finish of 4 breakaway riders.

== Route ==
The route was 152.9 kilometres (95.0 mi) long, following the second half of the men's course from Bastogne to Liège, and featured 10 classified climbs.

== Pre-race favorites ==
In pre-race analysis, Dutch rider Demi Vollering and Italian champion Elisa Longo Borghini were identified as top favorites. Vollering had two previous wins at the race (2021 and 2023), and strong recent form with a second-place finish at La Flèche Wallonne Femmes. Longo Borghini was coming off a win at Brabantse Pijl and has twice been runner-up at Liège–Bastogne–Liège. Reigning world champion Lotte Kopecky, winner of numerous other classics, has cited the race as a key objective, but some analysts have doubted whether she is suited to the longer climbs of Liège. Puck Pieterse, coming off a win at La Flèche Wallonne, and Pauline Ferrand-Prévot, winner of Paris–Roubaix were also considered strong contenders. Other riders mentioned in pre-race coverage included Anna van der Breggen, Kasia Niewiadoma, Juliette Labous, and Liane Lippert.

== Result ==
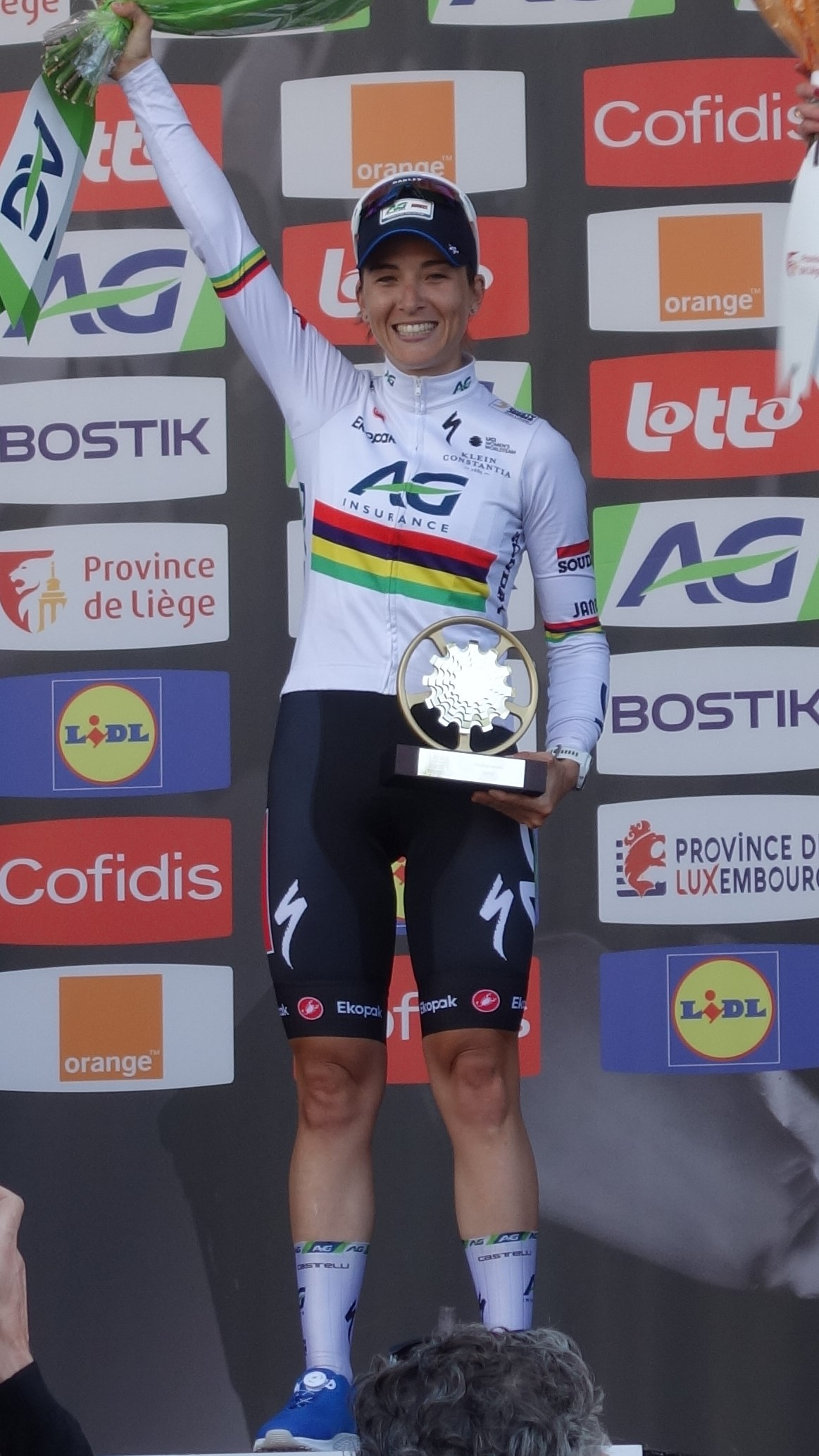
Kimberley Le Court on the podium.

Result
Rank	Rider	Team	Time
1	Kimberley Le Court (MRI)	AG Insurance–Soudal	4h 15' 42"
2	Puck Pieterse (NED)	Fenix–Deceuninck	+ 0"
3	Demi Vollering (NED)	FDJ–Suez	+ 0"
4	Cédrine Kerbaol (FRA)	EF Education–Oatly	+ 0"
5	Lotte Kopecky (BEL)	Team SD Worx–Protime	+ 24"
6	Marlen Reusser (SUI)	Movistar Team	+ 24"
7	Niamh Fisher-Black (NZL)	Lidl–Trek	+ 24"
8	Monica Trinca Colonel (ITA)	Liv AlUla Jayco	+ 24"
9	Katarzyna Niewiadoma (POL)	Canyon//SRAM zondacrypto	+ 24"
10	Yara Kastelijn (NED)	Fenix–Deceuninck	+ 24"
