= Steffi Häberlin =

Swiss cyclist

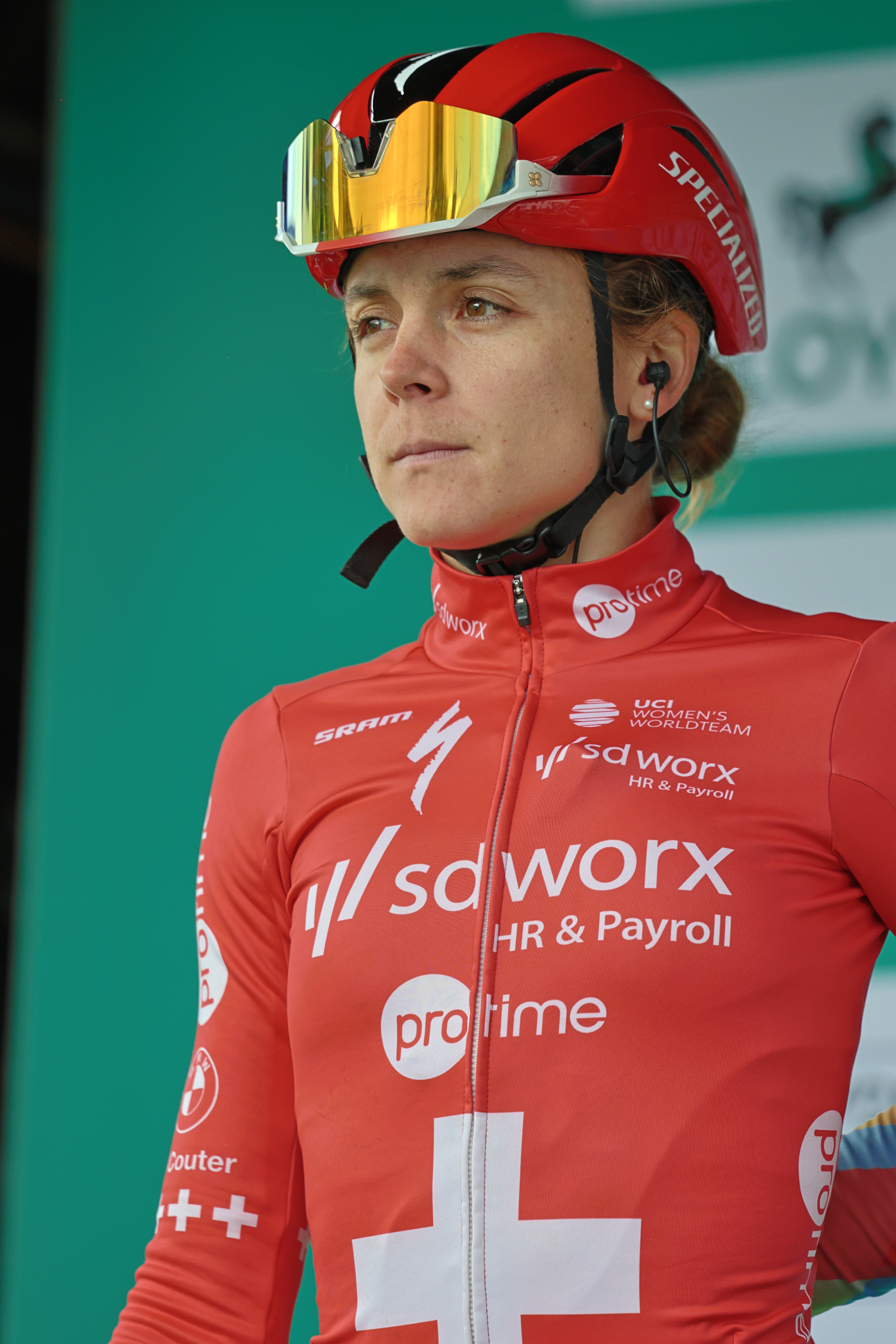
- Häberlin at the 2026 Tour of Britain Women

Personal information
- Born: 11 December 1997 (age 28) Münsterlingen, Switzerland
- Height: 1.64 m (5 ft 5 in)

Cycling career
- Sport: Cycling
- Current team: Team SD Worx–Protime
- Disciplines: Road; Mountain biking
- Role: Rider

Professional teams
- 2021: Thomus RN Swiss Bike Team (MTB)
- 2022: BIXS Performance Racing (MTB)
- 2023–2024: Team BMC (MTB)
- 2025–: Team SD Worx–Protime (road)

Major wins
- One-day races and Classics National Road Race Championships (2025, 2026)

Steffi Häberlin (born 11 December 1997) is a Swiss professional racing cyclist, who rides for UCI Women's WorldTeam Team SD Worx–Protime. Häberlin is a two-time winner of both the Swiss National Road Race Championships, and the marathon cross-country at the Swiss National Mountain Bike Championships.

== Major results ==
=== Mountain bike ===
2020
1st Marathon, National Championships
2021
2nd Marathon, UEC European Championships
2022
1st Marathon, National Championships
2023
3rd Short track, National Championships
2024
3rd Short track, National Championships

=== Road ===
2020
5th Road race, National Championships
2024
1st Leo Wirth Gedächtnissrennen
1st Bergrennen Silenen-Amsteg-Bristen
2025 (1 pro win)
National Championships

1st Road race
4th Time trial

5th Overall Tour de Romandie
8th Festival Elsy Jacobs à Garnich
2026 (1)
National Championships

1st Road race
2nd Time trial

2nd Festival Elsy Jacobs à Luxembourg
6th Overall Tour de Suisse
8th Overall UAE Tour
