= 2025 Tour of Britain Women =

2025 UCI Women's World Tour, race 18 of 27
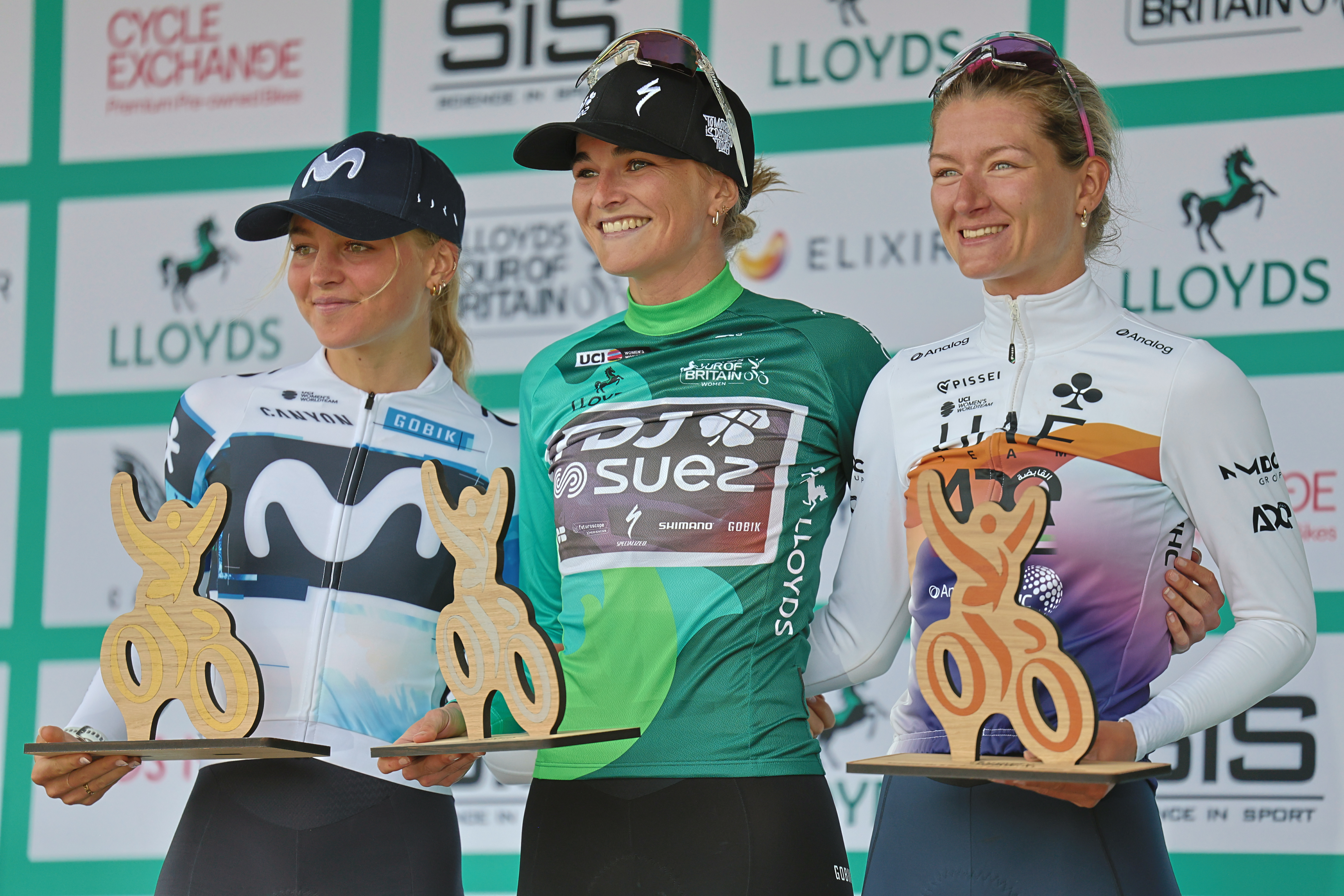
- Final podium with race winner Ally Wollaston in centre

Race details
- Dates: 5–8 June 2025
- Stages: 4
- Distance: 437.7 km (272.0 mi)
- Winning time: 10h 36' 45"

Results
Jersey awarded to the overall winner	Winner	Ally Wollaston (NZL)	(FDJ–Suez)
	Second	Cat Ferguson (GBR)	(Movistar Team)
	Third	Karlijn Swinkels (NED)	(UAE Team ADQ)
Jersey awarded to the points classification winner	Points	Cat Ferguson (GBR)	(Movistar Team)
Jersey awarded to the mountains classification winner	Mountains	Dominika Włodarczyk (POL)	(UAE Team ADQ)
Jersey awarded to the young rider classification winner	Young rider	Cat Ferguson (GBR)	(Movistar Team)
	Team	(France) FDJ–Suez	

The 2025 Tour of Britain Women was a British women's cycle stage race held in Great Britain as part of the UCI Women's World Tour. Taking place between 5 and 8 June, the race was the tenth edition of the Tour of Britain Women (named the Women's Tour prior to 2024). For this edition, the first two stages took place in North East England and the latter two in Scotland.

The race was won by New Zealand rider Ally Wollaston of FDJ–Suez by four seconds ahead of British rider Cat Ferguson of Movistar Team. Ferguson took the points and youth classifications, as well as winning stage 3. Dutch rider Karlijn Swinkels of UAE Team ADQ finished third overall. The mountains classification was won by Polish rider Dominika Włodarczyk of UAE Team ADQ, with the team classification won by FDJ–Suez.

== Teams ==
Nineteen teams took part: twelve UCI Women's WorldTeams, one UCI Women's ProTeam, five UCI Women's Continental Teams and the Great Britain national team. Fifteen teams started with six riders and four teams with five riders, totalling 110 riders at the start of the race.

UCI Women's WorldTeams

- AG Insurance–Soudal
- Canyon//SRAM Zondacrypto
- Ceratizit Pro Cycling
- FDJ–Suez
- Lidl–Trek
- Liv AlUla Jayco
- Movistar Team
- Team Picnic–PostNL
- Team SD Worx–Protime
- Visma–Lease a Bike
- UAE Team ADQ
- Uno-X Mobility

UCI Women's ProTeams

- EF Education–Oatly

UCI Women's Continental Teams

- CJ O'Shea Racing
- DAS–Hutchinson
- Handsling Alba Development Road Team
- Hess Cycling Team
- Smurfit Westrock Cycling Team

National Teams

- Great Britain

== Route and stages ==
The route was announced in May 2025. The first two stages took place in North East England and the second two in Scotland. Stage 2 finished in Saltburn-by-the-Sea on the 300 metre long Saltburn Bank climb with an average gradient of 11%, as previously used at the British National Road Race Championships.

Stage characteristics
Stage	Date	Course	Distance	Type	Stage winner
1	5 June	Dalby Forest to Redcar	85.6 km (53.2 mi)	Hilly stage	Kimberley Le Court (MRI)
2	6 June	Hartlepool to Saltburn-by-the-Sea	119.4 km (74.2 mi)	Hilly stage	Mara Roldan (CAN)
3	7 June	Kelso to Kelso	148.7 km (92.4 mi)	Hilly stage	Cat Ferguson (GBR)
4	8 June	Glasgow to Glasgow	84.0 km (52.2 mi)	Flat stage	Lorena Wiebes (NED)
Total			437.7 km (272.0 mi)		

== Race summary ==
Prior to the event, media tipped Kimberley Le Court (AG Insurance–Soudal), Kristen Faulkner (EF Education–Oatly), and Lorena Wiebes (Team SD Worx–Protime) for victory. British hopes included Cat Ferguson (Movistar Team) and Anna Henderson (Lidl–Trek). The race was broadcast live on YouTube, BBC iPlayer and Discovery+.

Stage 1 was in the North East of England, taking riders from Dalby Forest to Redcar over a 85.6 km (53.2 mi) route with two classified climbs. Le Court beat Faulkner in a sprint finish after the pair escaped the peloton with 30 km (19 mi) remaining. Lorena Wiebes (Team SD Worx–Protime) won the peloton sprint behind to come home third. Le Court led the race overall by five seconds ahead of Faulkner and Wiebes.

Stage 2 was also held in the North East, beginning in Hartlepool and ending in Saltburn-by-the-Sea. The 119.4 km (74.2 mi) route had two classified climbs, as well as two unclassified ascents of the 300-metre-long Saltburn Bank climb with an average gradient of 11%. Canadian rider Mara Roldan (Team Picnic–PostNL) escaped the peloton with 14 km (8.7 mi) remaining, winning the stage ahead of chasers including Riejanne Markus (Lidl–Trek), Ally Wollaston (FDJ–Suez) and Ferguson. Faulkner took the overall race lead by four seconds, ahead of Markus and Ferguson. Faulkner also took the lead in the mountains classification.

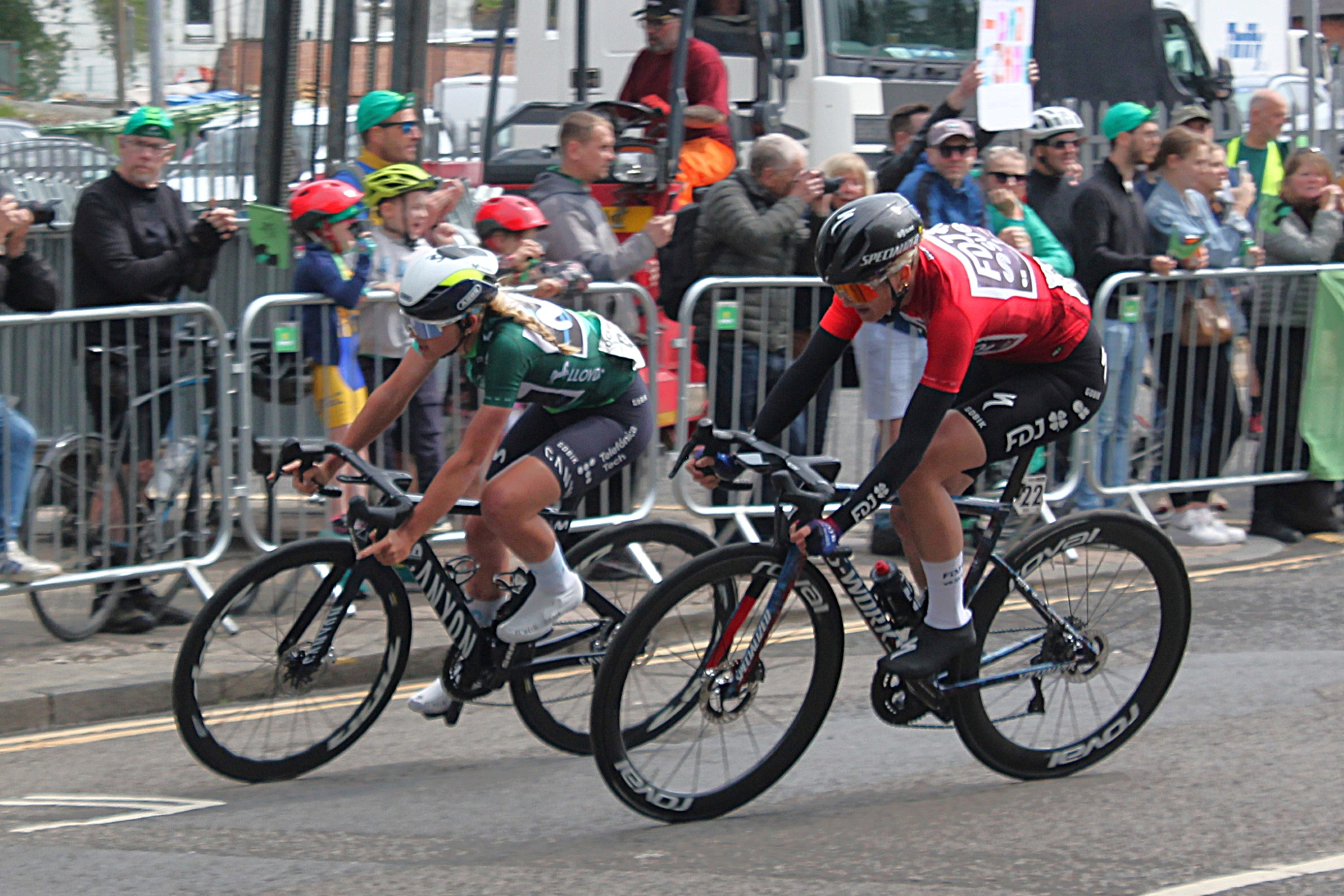
Cat Ferguson and Ally Wollaston sprint for bonus seconds on the final stage

Stage 3 took the riders to Scotland and a looping 148.7 km (92.4 mi) route around Kelso in the Scottish Borders with five classified climbs. The stage was marred by heavy rain, with multiple riders crashing – Le Court and Roldan abandoned the race as a consequence, and Faulkner fell out of contention of the general classification. The stage itself was won by Ferguson from a small group of Wollaston, Josie Nelson (Team Picnic–PostNL) and Karlijn Swinkels (UAE Team ADQ) – with Ferguson taking the overall race lead by three seconds ahead of Wollaston and Swinkels. Dominika Włodarczyk (UAE Team ADQ) took the lead in the mountains classification.

Stage 4 took place in the city of Glasgow, around ten laps of a 8.4 km (5.2 mi) course totalling 84.0 km (52.2 mi) in length, with a finish in Glasgow Green. All three intermediate sprints were won by Wollaston, gaining enough bonus seconds to draw level with Ferguson in the virtual general classification prior to the finish. In the final sprint, Wiebes beat Charlotte Kool (Team Picnic–PostNL) to win the stage – Wollaston finished third on the stage, thereby taking the overall race victory by four seconds ahead of Ferguson. Swinkels finished in third place overall. In the other classifications, Ferguson won the points and youth classifications, with the mountains classification won by Włodarczyk, and the team classification won by FDJ–Suez.

== Stages ==
=== Stage 1 ===
5 June 2025 — Dalby Forest to Redcar, 85.6 km (53.2 mi)

Stage 1 Result
Rank	Rider	Team	Time
1	Kimberley Le Court (MRI)	AG Insurance–Soudal	1h 59' 18"
2	Kristen Faulkner (USA)	EF Education–Oatly	+ 0"
3	Lorena Wiebes (NED)	Team SD Worx–Protime	+ 5"
4	Linda Zanetti (SUI)	Uno-X Mobility	+ 5"
5	Cat Ferguson (GBR)	Movistar Team	+ 5"
6	Millie Couzens (GBR)	Great Britain	+ 5"
7	Megan Jastrab (USA)	Team Picnic–PostNL	+ 5"
8	Ally Wollaston (NZL)	FDJ–Suez	+ 5"
9	Quinty Ton (NED)	Liv AlUla Jayco	+ 5"
10	Sarah Van Dam (CAN)	Ceratizit Pro Cycling	+ 5"

General classification after Stage 1
Rank	Rider	Team	Time
1	Kimberley Le Court (MRI)	AG Insurance–Soudal	1h 59' 05"
2	Kristen Faulkner (USA)	EF Education–Oatly	+ 5"
3	Lorena Wiebes (NED)	Team SD Worx–Protime	+ 14"
4	Karlijn Swinkels (NED)	UAE Team ADQ	+ 17"
5	Linda Zanetti (SUI)	Uno-X Mobility	+ 18"
6	Cat Ferguson (GBR)	Movistar Team	+ 18"
7	Millie Couzens (GBR)	Great Britain	+ 18"
8	Megan Jastrab (USA)	Team Picnic–PostNL	+ 18"
9	Ally Wollaston (NZL)	FDJ–Suez	+ 18"
10	Quinty Ton (NED)	Liv AlUla Jayco	+ 18"

=== Stage 2 ===
6 June 2025 — Hartlepool to Saltburn-by-the-Sea, 119.4 km (74.2 mi)

Stage 2 Result
Rank	Rider	Team	Time
1	Mara Roldan (CAN)	Team Picnic–PostNL	2h 57' 38"
2	Riejanne Markus (NED)	Lidl–Trek	+ 12"
3	Ally Wollaston (NZL)	FDJ–Suez	+ 18"
4	Megan Jastrab (USA)	Team Picnic–PostNL	+ 18"
5	Cat Ferguson (GBR)	Movistar Team	+ 18"
6	Karlijn Swinkels (NED)	UAE Team ADQ	+ 18"
7	Cecilie Uttrup Ludwig (DEN)	Canyon//SRAM Zondacrypto	+ 18"
8	Sarah Van Dam (CAN)	Ceratizit Pro Cycling	+ 18"
9	Kristen Faulkner (USA)	EF Education–Oatly	+ 18"
10	Quinty Ton (NED)	Liv AlUla Jayco	+ 22"

General classification after Stage 2
Rank	Rider	Team	Time
1	Kristen Faulkner (USA)	EF Education–Oatly	4h 57' 03"
2	Riejanne Markus (NED)	Lidl–Trek	+ 4"
3	Ally Wollaston (NZL)	FDJ–Suez	+ 12"
4	Cat Ferguson (GBR)	Movistar Team	+ 14"
5	Karlijn Swinkels (NED)	UAE Team ADQ	+ 14"
6	Megan Jastrab (USA)	Team Picnic–PostNL	+ 16"
7	Sarah Van Dam (CAN)	Ceratizit Pro Cycling	+ 16"
8	Cecilie Uttrup Ludwig (DEN)	Canyon//SRAM Zondacrypto	+ 16"
9	Quinty Ton (NED)	Liv AlUla Jayco	+ 20"
10	Anna Henderson (GBR)	Lidl–Trek	+ 20"

=== Stage 3 ===
7 June 2025 — Kelso to Kelso, 148.7 km (92.4 mi)

Stage 3 Result
Rank	Rider	Team	Time
1	Cat Ferguson (GBR)	Movistar Team	3h 42' 37"
2	Josie Nelson (GBR)	Team Picnic–PostNL	+ 0"
3	Ally Wollaston (NZL)	FDJ–Suez	+ 0"
4	Karlijn Swinkels (NED)	UAE Team ADQ	+ 0"
5	Eleonora Gasparrini (ITA)	UAE Team ADQ	+ 3"
6	Millie Couzens (GBR)	Great Britain	+ 38"
7	Quinty Ton (NED)	Liv AlUla Jayco	+ 38"
8	Imogen Wolff (GBR)	Visma–Lease a Bike	+ 38"
9	Sarah Van Dam (CAN)	Ceratizit Pro Cycling	+ 38"
10	Charlotte Kool (NED)	Team Picnic–PostNL	+ 38"

General classification after Stage 3
Rank	Rider	Team	Time
1	Cat Ferguson (GBR)	Movistar Team	8h 39' 42"
2	Ally Wollaston (NZL)	FDJ–Suez	+ 3"
3	Karlijn Swinkels (NED)	UAE Team ADQ	+ 12"
4	Riejanne Markus (NED)	Lidl–Trek	+ 40"
5	Sarah Van Dam (CAN)	Ceratizit Pro Cycling	+ 52"
6	Megan Jastrab (USA)	Team Picnic–PostNL	+ 52"
7	Cecilie Uttrup Ludwig (DEN)	Canyon//SRAM Zondacrypto	+ 52"
8	Quinty Ton (NED)	Liv AlUla Jayco	+ 56"
9	Anna Henderson (GBR)	Lidl–Trek	+ 56"
10	Millie Couzens (GBR)	Great Britain	+ 59"

=== Stage 4 ===
8 June 2025 — Glasgow to Glasgow, 84.0 km (52.2 mi)

Stage 4 Result
Rank	Rider	Team	Time
1	Lorena Wiebes (NED)	Team SD Worx–Protime	1h 57' 13"
2	Charlotte Kool (NED)	Team Picnic–PostNL	+ 0"
3	Ally Wollaston (NZL)	FDJ–Suez	+ 0"
4	Chiara Consonni (ITA)	Canyon//SRAM Zondacrypto	+ 0"
5	Babette van der Wolf (NED)	EF Education–Oatly	+ 0"
6	Anna Henderson (GBR)	Lidl–Trek	+ 0"
7	Cat Ferguson (GBR)	Movistar Team	+ 0"
8	Célia Gery (FRA)	FDJ–Suez	+ 0"
9	Linda Zanetti (SUI)	Uno-X Mobility	+ 0"
10	Nienke Veenhoven (NED)	Visma–Lease a Bike	+ 0"

General classification after Stage 4
Rank	Rider	Team	Time
1	Ally Wollaston (NZL)	FDJ–Suez	10h 36' 45"
2	Cat Ferguson (GBR)	Movistar Team	+ 4"
3	Karlijn Swinkels (NED)	UAE Team ADQ	+ 22"
4	Riejanne Markus (NED)	Lidl–Trek	+ 50"
5	Sarah Van Dam (CAN)	Ceratizit Pro Cycling	+ 1' 01"
6	Cecilie Uttrup Ludwig (DEN)	Canyon//SRAM Zondacrypto	+ 1' 02"
7	Megan Jastrab (USA)	Team Picnic–PostNL	+ 1' 02"
8	Anna Henderson (GBR)	Lidl–Trek	+ 1' 06"
9	Quinty Ton (NED)	Liv AlUla Jayco	+ 1' 06"
10	Millie Couzens (GBR)	Great Britain	+ 1' 09"

== Classification leadership table ==
Classification leadership by stage
Stage	Winner	General classification	Points classification	Mountains classification	Young rider classification	Team classification	Combativity award (Note: Combativity awards for each stage were fan-voted; the overall winner was chosen by the race director.)
1	Kimberley Le Court	Kimberley Le Court	Kimberley Le Court	Kimberley Le Court	Cat Ferguson	Movistar Team	Kimberley Le Court
2	Mara Roldan	Kristen Faulkner	Kristen Faulkner	Kristen Faulkner	Cat Ferguson	FDJ–Suez	Tiffany Keep
3	Cat Ferguson	Cat Ferguson	Cat Ferguson	Dominika Włodarczyk	Cat Ferguson	FDJ–Suez	Lizzie Deignan
4	Lorena Wiebes	Ally Wollaston	Cat Ferguson	Dominika Włodarczyk	Cat Ferguson	FDJ–Suez	Cat Ferguson
Final		Ally Wollaston	Cat Ferguson	Dominika Włodarczyk	Cat Ferguson	FDJ–Suez	Kristen Faulkner

== Classification standings ==
Legend
Denotes the winner of the general classification	Denotes the winner of the mountains classification
Denotes the winner of the points classification	Denotes the winner of the young rider classification

=== General classification ===
Final general classification (1–10)
Rank	Rider	Team	Time
1	Ally Wollaston (NZL)	FDJ–Suez	10h 36' 45"
2	Cat Ferguson (GBR)	Movistar Team	+ 4"
3	Karlijn Swinkels (NED)	UAE Team ADQ	+ 22"
4	Riejanne Markus (NED)	Lidl–Trek	+ 50"
5	Sarah Van Dam (CAN)	Ceratizit Pro Cycling	+ 1' 01"
6	Cecilie Uttrup Ludwig (DEN)	Canyon//SRAM Zondacrypto	+ 1' 02"
7	Megan Jastrab (USA)	Team Picnic–PostNL	+ 1' 02"
8	Anna Henderson (GBR)	Lidl–Trek	+ 1' 06"
9	Quinty Ton (NED)	Liv AlUla Jayco	+ 1' 06"
10	Millie Couzens (GBR)	Great Britain	+ 1' 09"

=== Points classification ===
Final points classification (1–10)
Rank	Rider	Team	Points
1	Cat Ferguson (GBR)	Movistar Team	79
2	Ally Wollaston (NZL)	FDJ–Suez	79
3	Lorena Wiebes (NED)	Team SD Worx–Protime	42
4	Kristen Faulkner (USA)	EF Education–Oatly	37
5	Karlijn Swinkels (NED)	UAE Team ADQ	23
6	Charlotte Kool (NED)	Team Picnic–PostNL	19
7	Riejanne Markus (NED)	Lidl–Trek	18
8	Josie Nelson (GBR)	Team Picnic–PostNL	18
9	Megan Jastrab (USA)	Team Picnic–PostNL	16
10	Célia Gery (FRA)	FDJ–Suez	16

=== Mountains classification ===
Final mountains classification (1–10)
Rank	Rider	Team	Points
1	Dominika Włodarczyk (POL)	UAE Team ADQ	26
2	Cecilie Uttrup Ludwig (DEN)	Canyon//SRAM Zondacrypto	24
3	Kristen Faulkner (USA)	EF Education–Oatly	20
4	Karlijn Swinkels (NED)	UAE Team ADQ	19
5	Lauren Dickson (GBR)	Handsling Alba Development Road Team	19
6	Eleonora Camilla Gasparrini (ITA)	UAE Team ADQ	18
7	Célia Gery (FRA)	FDJ–Suez	17
8	Amber Kraak (NED)	FDJ–Suez	16
9	Anouska Koster (NED)	Uno-X Mobility	15
10	Cat Ferguson (GBR)	Movistar Team	13

=== Young rider classification ===
Final young rider classification (1–10)
Rank	Rider	Team	Time
1	Cat Ferguson (GBR)	Movistar Team	10h 36' 49"
2	Millie Couzens (GBR)	Great Britain	+ 1' 05"
3	Imogen Wolff (GBR)	Visma–Lease a Bike	+ 2' 53"
4	Linda Riedmann (GER)	Visma–Lease a Bike	+ 2' 55"
5	Grace Lister (GBR)	Hess Cycling Team	+ 3' 11"
6	Flora Perkins (GBR)	Great Britain	+ 5' 48"
7	Zoe Bäckstedt (GBR)	Canyon//SRAM Zondacrypto	+ 7' 04"
8	Célia Gery (FRA)	FDJ–Suez	+ 7' 55"
9	Robyn Clay (GBR)	DAS–Hutchinson	+ 8' 05"
10	Ella Maclean-Howell (GBR)	Great Britain	+ 8' 18"

=== Team classification ===
Final team classification (1–10)
Rank	Team	Time
1	(France) FDJ–Suez	31h 53' 45"
2	(Netherlands) Team Picnic–PostNL	+ 3' 49"
3	(United States) Lidl–Trek	+ 4' 07"
4	(United Arab Emirates) UAE Team ADQ	+ 8' 12"
5	(Spain) Movistar Team	+ 11' 08"
6	(United Kingdom) Great Britain	+ 11' 53"
7	(Germany) Canyon//SRAM Zondacrypto	+ 12' 47"
8	(Australia) Liv AlUla Jayco	+ 16' 32"
9	(Germany) Ceratizit Pro Cycling	+ 16' 41"
10	(Netherlands) Visma–Lease a Bike	+ 17' 52"
