= Kimberley Le Court =

Mauritian cyclist (born 1996)

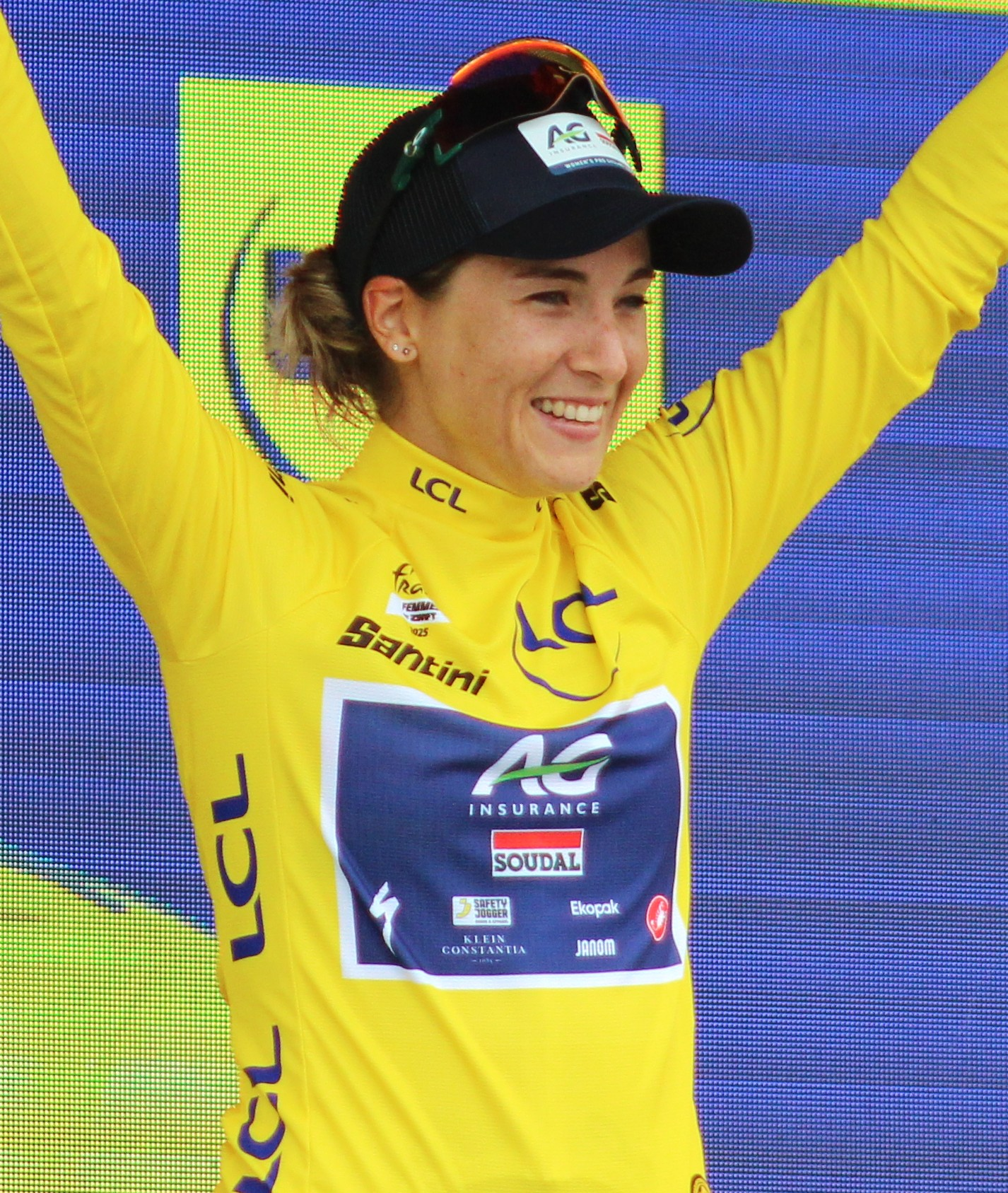
- Le Court at the 2025 Tour de France Femmes

Personal information
- Full name: Mary Patricia Kimberley Le Court de Billot
- Born: 23 March 1996 (age 30) Curepipe, Mauritius
- Height: 1.68 m (5 ft 6 in)
- Weight: 56 kg (123 lb)

Cycling career
- Sport: Cycling
- Current team: AG Insurance–Soudal
- Disciplines: Road; Mountain biking
- Role: Rider

Amateur teams
- 2016: Time Freight
- 2018–2023: Demacon Ladies

Professional teams
- 2015: Matrix Fitness Pro Cycling
- 2016: Bizkaia–Durango
- 2024–: AG Insurance–Soudal

Major wins
- Mountain bike Cape Epic (2023) Road Major Tours Tour de France 2 individual stages (2025, 2026) Giro d'Italia 1 individual stage (2024) Stage races Tour of Britain (2026) One-day races and Classics Liège–Bastogne–Liège (2025)

Kimberley Le Court Pienaar (born Mary Patricia Kimberley Le Court de Billot; 23 March 1996), known as Kim Le Court, is a Mauritian professional racing cyclist who rides for UCI Women's WorldTeam AG Insurance–Soudal. She has won the Mauritius road race national championships four times in 2016, 2019, 2024 and 2025, and won the time trial national championship twice in 2024 and 2025. In 2025 Le Court became the first African cyclist to lead the race and wear the yellow jersey in the Tour de France Femmes, and the first African cyclist to win a stage of the Tour after winning stage 5. In the 2025 Tour de France Femmes, she obtained the yellow jersey after stage 2, becoming the first female African cyclist in wearing it. In the 2026 Tour de France Femmes, she finished in 9th position overall and won stage 6, becoming the first African to win two stages of the Tour. In the 2026 Tour of Britain Women, Kim Le Court won the third stage and ranked first overall, winning her first UCI Women’s WorldTour (2.WWT) and the Mauritian national champion becoming at the same time, the first-ever African rider to win the overall title in the event's history.

== Early life and education ==
Mary Patricia Kimberley Le Court de Billot was born on 23 March 1996 in Curepipe, Mauritius, to a Mauritian father of French descent and a Scottish mother. Her brother Olivier is also a road racing cyclist.

== Career ==
Le Court represented Mauritius at the 2019 African Games in cycling, winning two medals: gold in the women's cross-country marathon and the bronze in the women's cross-country Olympic event. Le Court has won the Mauritius road race national championships five times in 2016, 2019, 2024, 2025 and 2026 and won the time trial national championship three times in 2024, 2025 and 2026.

In 2024, Le Court signed with AG Insurance–Soudal, reportedly after contacting every UCI Women's World Tour team asking for an opportunity. Later that year, she won stage 8 at the Giro d'Italia Women, her first stage win at the UCI Women's World Tour.

Kim Le Court rides for UCI Women's WorldTeam AG Insurance–Soudal. In 2025, Le Court won Liège–Bastogne–Liège Femmes, finishing first in a sprint of 4 breakaway riders. In the Tour de France Femmes, she obtained the yellow jersey after stage 2, becoming the first female African cyclist to wear it.

== Major results ==
2015
African Games

1st Road race
8th Time trial

2016
1st Road race, National Road Championships
3rd Road race, African Road Championships
2017
2nd Road race, African Road Championships
2018
9th Road race, African Road Championships
2019
African Games

1st Cross-country marathon
3rd Cross-country
6th Road race

1st Road race, National Road Championships
8th Road race, African Road Championships
2022
African Road Championships

1st Team relay
2nd Team time trial
2nd Road race

5th Cross-country, Commonwealth Games
2023
African Road Championships

1st Team relay
1st Team time trial
3rd Time trial
10th Road race

1st Overall Cape Epic (with Vera Looser)
2024
National Road Championships

1st Road race
1st Time trial

1st Stage 8 Giro d'Italia
9th Classic Brugge–De Panne
9th Cadel Evans Great Ocean Road Race
10th Paris–Roubaix
2025
National Road Championships

1st Road race
1st Time trial

1st Liège–Bastogne–Liège
1st Giro dell'Emilia
Tour de France

1st Stage 5
Held after Stages 2 & 5–7

1st Stage 1 Tour of Britain
3rd Overall UAE Tour
5th Tour of Flanders
8th Road race, UCI Road World Championships
9th Trofeo Alfredo Binda
2026
National Road Championships

1st Road race
1st Time trial

Tour de France

9th Overall
1st Stage 6

Tour of Britain

1st Overall
1st Stage 3

4th Overall UAE Tour
4th Overall Tour de Suisse

== Personal life ==
Le Court moved from Mauritius to South Africa, from South Africa to Europe, and then back to South Africa, before ending up with her current cycling team.

Le Court married South African mountain biker Ian Pienaar in autumn 2023.
