= ReVolta =

Women's cycling race in Catalonia, Spain

reVolta
Race details
- Region: Catalunya
- Discipline: Road
- Type: Single day race
- Organiser: Volta Ciclista a Catalunya
- Race director: Rubèn Peris i Latorre
- Web site: www.voltacatalunya.cat/ca/revolta

History
- First edition: 2018
- Editions: 4 (as of 2023)
- First winner: Lauren Stephens (USA)
- Most recent: Claire Steels (GBR)

The reVolta was an annual professional women's road bicycle racing event in Catalonia, Spain.

First held in 2018, it was initially organised on the same day as the last stage of the Volta a Catalunya. However, as there is another -more important- race scheduled on the same date, it has since been organised independently. American cyclist Lauren Stephens won the first edition.

It was replaced in 2024 by the women's Volta a Catalunya Femenina, a stage race.

== History ==
reVolta's first edition was held March 25, 2018, the same date that the men's Volta a Catalunya's last stage was scheduled. 118 cyclists started the race, which would last 45 minutes plus an extra lap at a 3.85 km circuit around the Montjuïc mountain, in Barcelona. Doing so, the event would take advantage of the infrastructure and TV coverage from the men's event. Lauren Stephens (Cylance ProCycling) became the first winner, followed by local riders Lorena Llamas (Movistar Team) and Sofia Rodríguez (Sopela Women Team).

Even though it was supposed to be organised annually, due to several issues, the 2019 and 2020 editions were not held. In 2019, there was another race scheduled on the same date of the last stage of the Volta 2019 (31 March 2019). The 2020 edition, scheduled by July 12, was cancelled due to the COVID-19 pandemic.

On January 11, 2021, it was announced that the second reVolta edition would be scheduled next May 30, 2021, around Sant Cugat del Vallès. Katrine Aalerud (Movistar Team) became its second winner.

== Winners ==
Year	Rider	Team
2018	Lauren Stephens (USA)	Cylance Pro Cycling
2019	Not organised	
2020	Cancelled due to COVID-19 pandemic	
2021	Katrine Aalerud (NOR)	Movistar Team
2022	Clara Koppenburg (GER)	Cofidis
2023	Claire Steels (GBR)	Israel Premier Tech Roland

=== Wins per country ===
Wins	Country
1	United States
1	Norway
1	Germany
1	United Kingdom
