= Volta a Catalunya Femenina =

Women's cycling race in Catalonia, Spain

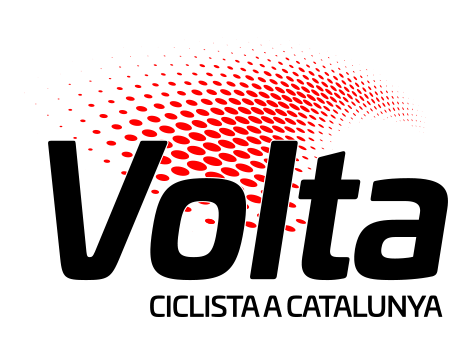

Race details
- Date: June
- Region: Catalonia, Spain
- English name: Tour of Catalonia Women
- Discipline: Road
- Type: Stage race
- Web site: voltacatalunyafemenina.cat

History
- First edition: 2024
- Editions: 3 (as of 2026)
- First winner: Marianne Vos (NED)
- Most wins: No repeat winners
- Most recent: Paula Blasi (SPA)

The Volta a Catalunya Femenina is a road cycling race held annually in Catalonia, Spain. It was first held in 2024 as a counterpart to the men's Volta a Catalunya. It is classified as a 2.1 race by the Union Cycliste Internationale.

== History ==
The men's Volta a Catalunya was first held in 1911, and is currently held as a UCI World Tour race as one of the major tune up races for the Giro d'Italia and Tour de France. The first women's equivalent was the ReVolta, a one-day race held on the final day of the men's race, usually in March. In 2024, the ReVolta was replace by the Volta a Catalunya Femenina, a three-stage race classified as 2.1. The organizers intend the race to eventually serve as a warm-up for major women's stage races like the Giro d'Italia Women and Tour de France Femmes.

Marianne Vos won the first edition in 2024, after winning the second stage summit finish on La Molina. In 2026, Paula Blasi became the first Catalan rider, male or female, to win the Volta a Catalunya since Joaquim Rodríguez in 2014.

== Winners ==
Year	Country	Rider	Team
2024	Netherlands	Marianne Vos	Visma–Lease a Bike
2025	Netherlands	Demi Vollering	FDJ–Suez
2026	Spain	Paula Blasi	UAE Team ADQ
