= Mara Roldan =

Canadian cyclist (born 2004)

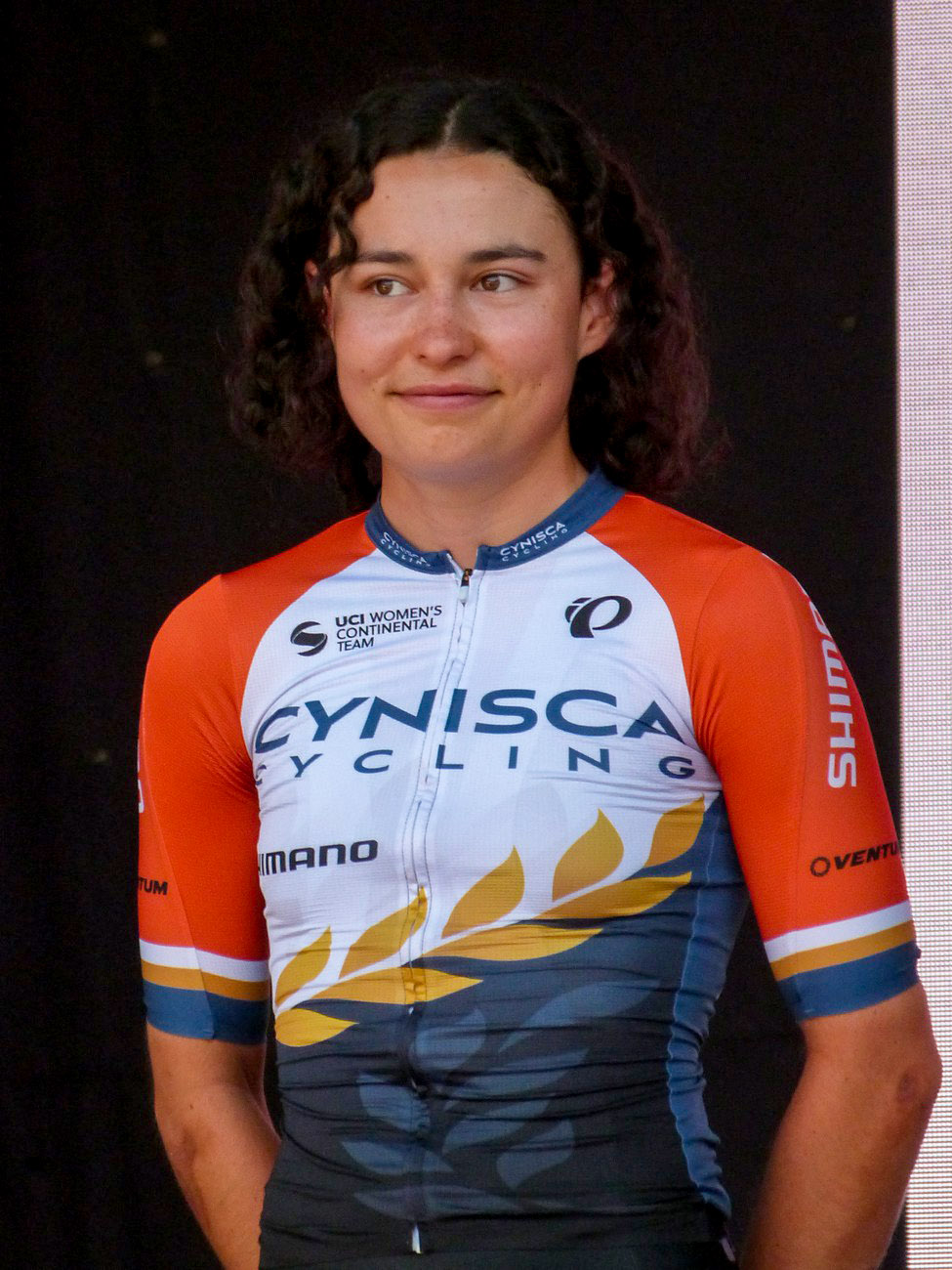
- Roldan in 2024

Personal information
- Full name: Mara Roldan
- Born: 7 April 2004 (age 22) Whitehorse, Canada

Cycling career
- Sport: Cycling
- Current team: Team Picnic–PostNL
- Discipline: Road
- Role: Rider

Professional teams
- 2023–2024: Cynisca Cycling
- 2025–: Team Picnic–PostNL

Mara Roldan is a Canadian professional cyclist, who currently rides for UCI Women's WorldTeam Team Picnic–PostNL.

Roldan focused primarily on mountain biking as a junior, transitioning in 2019 with the goal of riding at the 2019 Western Canada Summer Games. She is a U23 Canadian time trial champion, and placed third in the elite women's road race in 2024. In 2025, Roldan joined Team Picnic–PostNL on a three year contract. In June 2025, she won her first UCI Women's World Tour stage at the Tour of Britain Women, winning stage 2 after a 14 kilometre solo attack. The next day she was involved in a crash that broke her femur.

== Major results ==
2024
Redlands Bicycle Classic

1st Stages 1 & 5

1st Stage 2 Volta a Portugal Feminina
2025
1st Stage 2 Tour of Britain
10th Amstel Gold Race
