= O'Shea Redchilli Bikes =

British cycling team

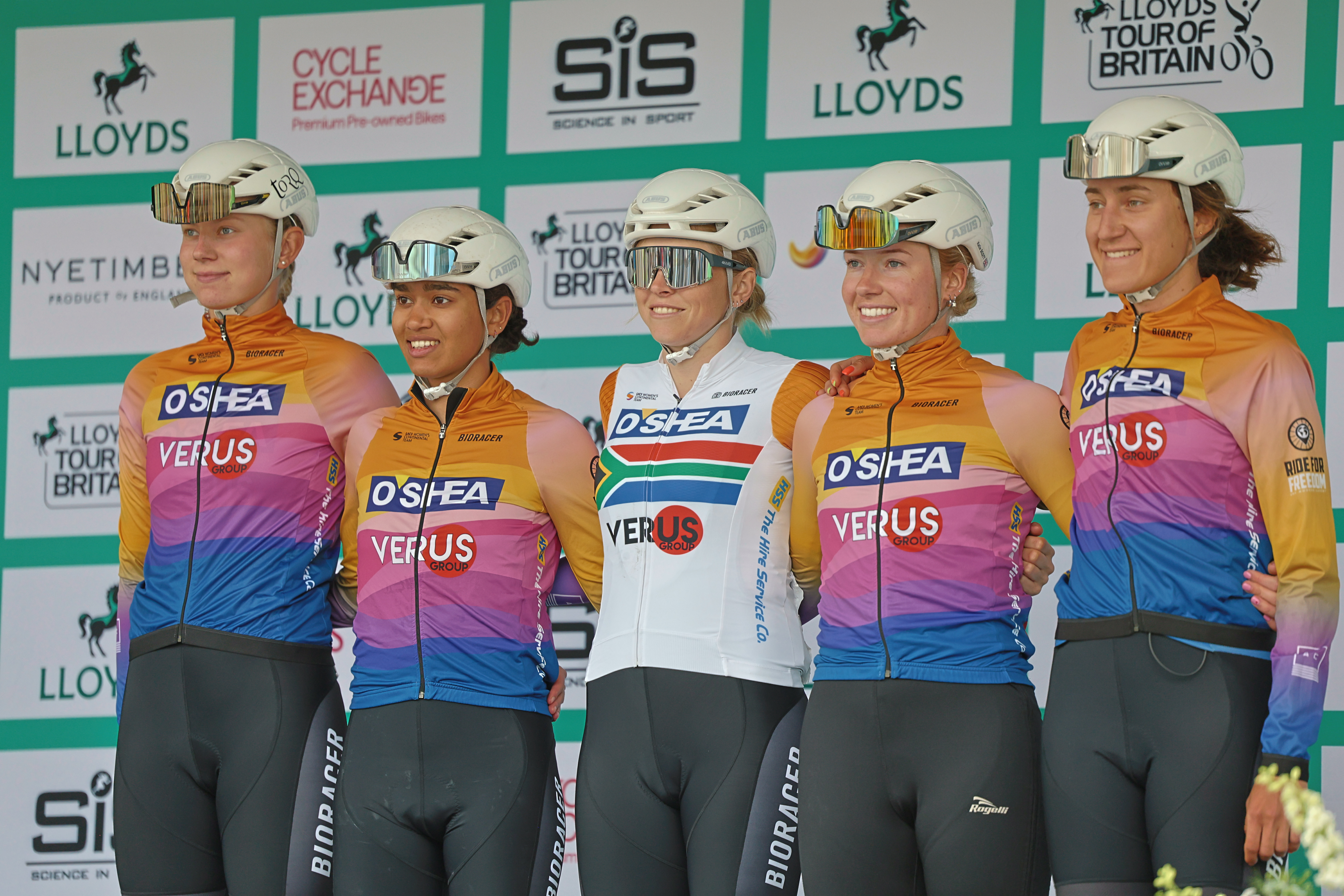
- The team at the 2025 Tour of Britain Women

Team information
- UCI code: AWO (2021–)
- Registered: Great Britain
- Founded: 2017
- Discipline: Road
- Status: UCI Women's Continental Team (2021–present)
- Bicycles: Redchilli Bikes
- Website: Team home page

Key personnel
- Team manager: Pat Hayes

Team name history
- 2017; 2018; 2019; 2020; 2021–2023; 2024; 2025; 2026–: Liv–AWOL; Admiral–Liv–AWOL; Liv–AWOL–Spok'd; AWOL Worx; AWOL O'Shea; Doltcini O'Shea; CJ O'Shea Racing; O'Shea Redchilli Bikes

O'Shea Redchilli Bikes (UCI team code: AWO) is a British women's road bicycle racing team, established in 2016. Since 2021, the team has been registered as a UCI Women's Continental Team which participates in elite women's races. The team took part in the Tour of Britain Women in both 2024, 2025 and 2026. The team is registered with the Mouvement pour un cyclisme crédible (MPCC).

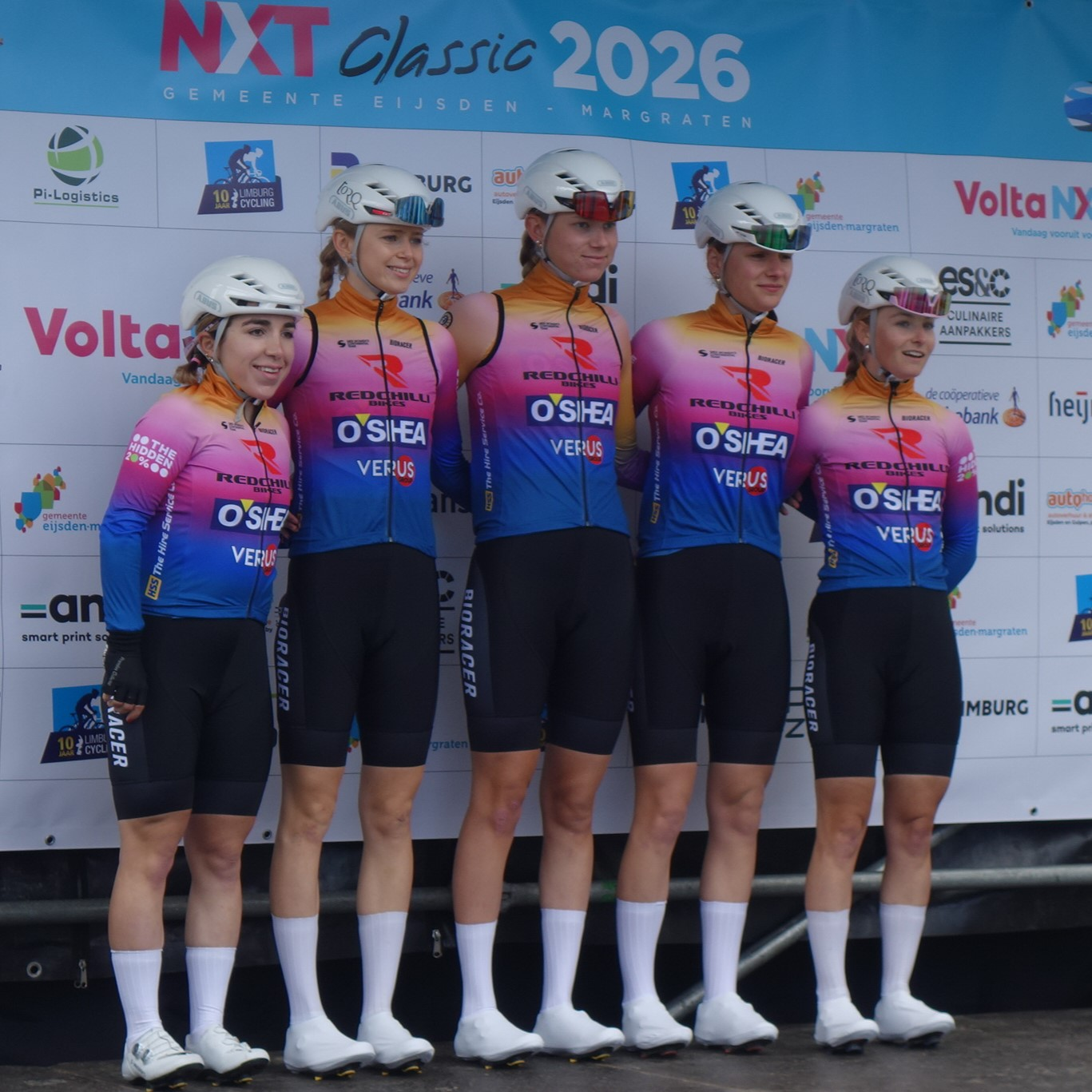
The team at the 2026 NXT Classic Women

== National champions ==
2021
Ireland Track (Scratch race), Autumn Collins
2023
Ireland TT, Kelly Murphy

2025
South Africa Road Race Championships, S'annara Grove
