= Paula Blasi =

Spanish cyclist

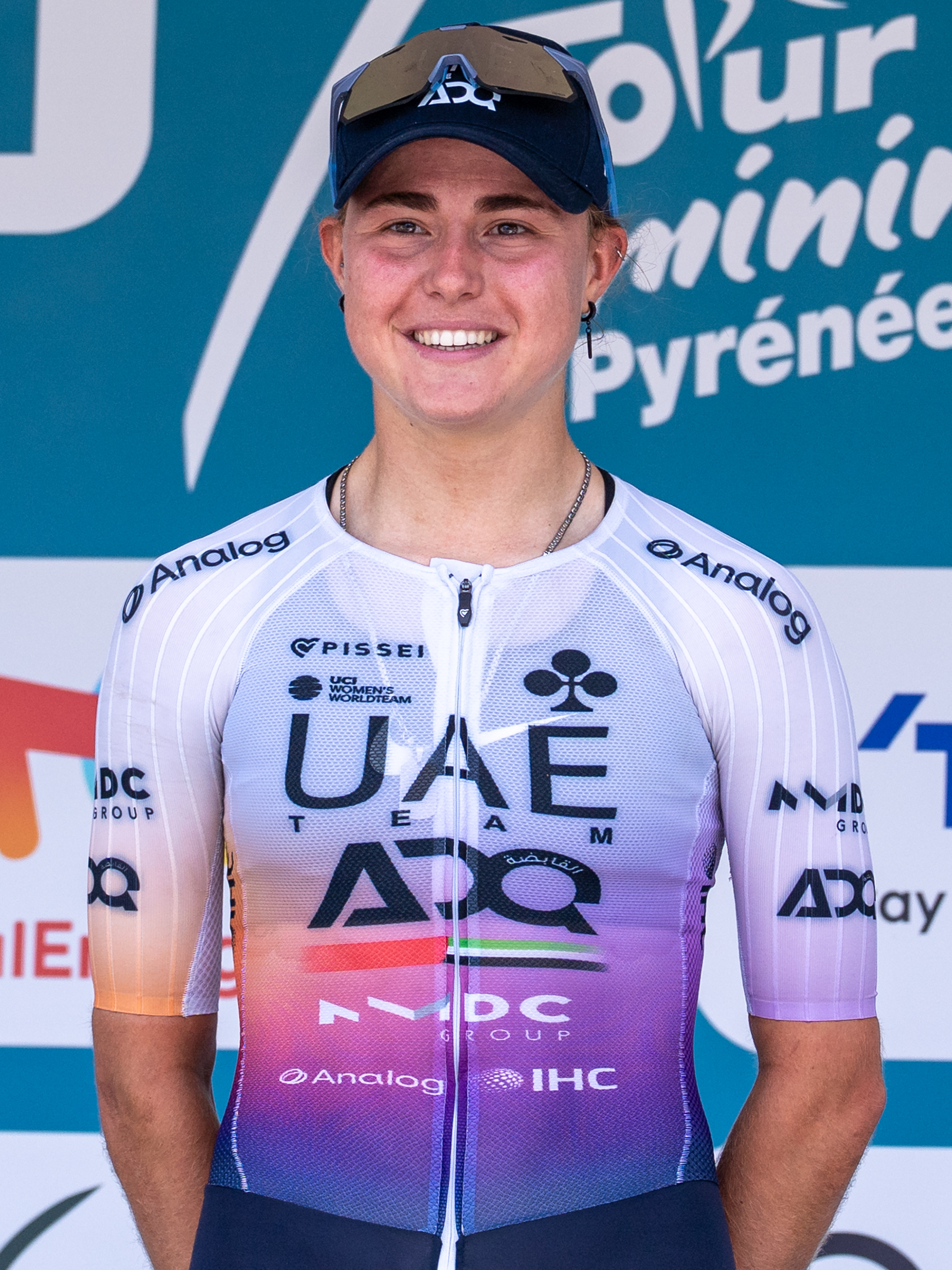
- Blasi in 2026

Personal information
- Full name: Paula Blasi Cairol
- Born: 19 February 2003 (age 23) Esplugues de Llobregat, Spain
- Height: 1.71 m (5 ft 7 in)
- Weight: 57 kg (126 lb)

Cycling career
- Sport: Cycling
- Current team: UAE Team L'Imad
- Discipline: Road
- Role: Rider

Amateur team
- 2024: Massi–Baix Ter

Professional teams
- 2025: UAE Development Team
- 2025–: UAE Team ADQ

Major wins
- Major Tours La Vuelta Femenina General classification (2026) Mountains classification (2026) Stage races Volta a Catalunya (2026) One-day races and Classics Amstel Gold Race (2026)
Medal record
Representing Spain
Women's road bicycle racing
World Championships
Bronze medal – third place	2025 Kigali	Under-23 road race
European Championships
Gold medal – first place	2025 Guilherand-Granges	Under-23 road race

Paula Blasi Cairol (born 19 February 2003) is a Spanish racing cyclist, who currently rides for UCI Women's WorldTeam UAE Team L'Imad.

Blasi began her athletic career in middle-distance running, as well as the duathlon and triathlon. After an injury in February 2024 forced her to stop running, she could only train on her bike and decided to join a cycling club at the age of 21. She immediately achieved numerous podium places in national races. After winning the Catalan road and time trial championships, she placed seventh in the Spanish time trial championships. In the second half of the season, she finished fourth overall in the Tour de l'Avenir and the Giro della Toscana Int. Femminile – Memorial Michela Fanini, where she was also the best young rider. These results allowed her to sign with the UAE Development Team in 2025, before stepping up to UAE Team ADQ in May after taking wins at the Gran Premio della Liberazione and the Pointe du Raz Ladies Classic.

In 2026, Blasi won her first major race, winning the Amstel Gold Race in a solo victory after a late attack. Three weeks later, she won the overall and mountains classifications of La Vuelta after finishing second in the last two mountain stages.

== Major results ==
2024
Catalonia Road Championships

1st Road race
1st Time trial

1st Overall Volta Ciclista a Osona

1st Stage 2

1st Trofeu Speed Republik
2nd GP Léon
4th Overall Giro della Toscana

1st Young rider classification

4th Overall Tour de l'Avenir
2025 (4 pro wins)
UEC European Under-23 Road Championships

1st Road race
10th Time trial

1st La Périgord Ladies
1st Gran Premio della Liberazione
1st Pointe du Raz Ladies Classic
1st Campionat Sabadell Femeni
3rd Road race, UCI Road World Under-23 Championships
3rd Time trial, National Road Championships
4th Overall Tour de Romandie

1st Points classification
1st Young rider classification
1st Stage 1 (ITT)

5th Overall Tour Féminin International des Pyrénées

1st Young rider classification

5th The Traka 200
6th Overall Tour de l'Avenir
6th Grand Prix Féminin de Chambéry
7th Volta NXT Classic
2026 (2)
1st Overall La Vuelta Femenina

1st Mountains classification

1st Overall Volta a Catalunya Femenina

1st Mountains classification
1st Youth classification
1st Stage 2

1st Overall Tour Féminin International des Pyrénées

1st Mountains classification
1st Stage 2

1st Amstel Gold Race
1st Durango-Durango Emakumeen Saria
3rd Overall Tour Down Under

1st Mountains classification

3rd La Flèche Wallonne
5th Liège–Bastogne–Liège
5th Clásica de Almería
8th Tour Down Under One Day Race
9th Trofeo Oro in Euro
9th Brabantse Pijl
Tour de France

Held after Stages 1–4
