= Claire Steels =

British cyclist

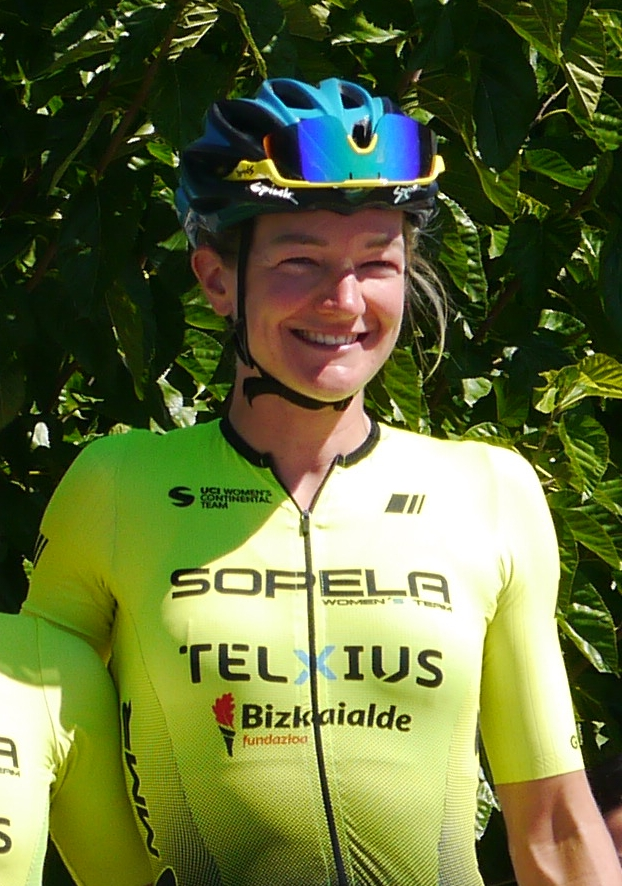
- Claire Steels at TCFIA 2022.

Personal information
- Born: 9 November 1986 (age 39)

Cycling career
- Sport: Cycling
- Current team: Movistar Team
- Discipline: Road
- Role: Rider

Professional teams
- 2020–2022: Sopela Women's Team
- 2023: Israel Premier Tech Roland
- 2024–: Movistar Team

Claire Steels (born 9 November 1986) is a British professional racing cyclist, who currently rides for UCI Women's WorldTeam Movistar Team.

Steels grew up in the market town of Bourne, Lincolnshire in the United Kingdom. After completing education at Bourne Grammar School and University of Hull. Steels became a British professional racing cyclist, who currently rides for UCI Women's World Tour Team, Roland Le Dévoluy.

In 2019, Steels took the overall classification, and a time trial stage win, at Rás na mBan.

Steels competed in the 2023 edition of the British National Road Race Championships. After finding herself in a front group of nine riders, she attacked on Skelton Green to reduce the selection to seven. When eventual winner Pfeiffer Georgi attacked from the group on the final descent of the race, Steels was able to move away from the remaining riders, finishing as runner-up.

== Major results ==
2019
1st Overall Rás na mBan

1st Stage 4

2021
9th Grand Prix Féminin de Chambéry
2022
5th La Périgord Ladies
8th Overall Tour Cycliste Féminin International de l'Ardèche
2023
1st ReVolta
2nd Road race, National Road Championships
3rd Durango-Durango Emakumeen Saria
6th Overall Tour de Suisse
9th Trofeo Alfredo Binda
2024
2nd Time trial, National Road Championships
