= AG Insurance–Soudal =

Belgian cycling team

Team information
- UCI code: APB (2019); NXG (2020–2022); AGS (2023–)
- Registered: Netherlands (2019–2022); Belgium (2023–)
- Founded: 2019
- Status: National (2019); UCI Women's Continental Team (2020–2023); UCI Women's WorldTour Team (2024–2025)
- Bicycles: Specialized
- Website: Team home page

Key personnel
- General manager: Jürgen Foré
- Team manager: Jolien D'Hoore

Team name history
- 2019 2020–2021 2022 2022 2023 2024–: Rogelli–Gyproc–APB; NXTG Racing; NXTG by Experza; AG Insurance–NXTG; AG Insurance–Soudal–Quick-Step; AG Insurance–Soudal
AG Insurance–Soudal jersey
Jersey

AG Insurance–Soudal is a Belgian women's road bicycle racing team which participates in elite women's races. The team was established in 2019.

== Sponsors ==
The team is sponsored by two Belgian companies – AG Insurance and Soudal, a building material & chemical company.

== Team roster ==
As of 30 July 2025.

Rider	Date of birth
Fauve Bastiaenssen (BEL)	22 October 1997 (age 28)
Mireia Benito (ESP)	20 January 1996 (age 30)
Julia Borgström (SWE)	9 June 2001 (age 25)
Shari Bossuyt (BEL)	5 September 2000 (age 26)
Alana Castrique (BEL)	25 June 1996 (age 30)
Lore De Schepper (BEL)	3 March 2003 (age 23)
Justine Ghekiere (BEL)	14 May 1996 (age 30)
Sarah Gigante (AUS)	6 October 2000 (age 25)
Marthe Goossens (BEL)	12 February 2000 (age 26)
Kimberley Le Court (MRI)	23 June 1996 (age 30)
Anya Louw (AUS)	16 October 2000 (age 25)
Alexandra Manly (AUS)	28 February 1996 (age 30)
Gaia Masetti (ITA)	28 April 2001 (age 25)
Ashleigh Moolman-Pasio (RSA)	9 December 1985 (age 40)
Ilse Pluimers (NED)	29 May 2001 (age 25)
Nicole Steigenga (NED)	27 January 1998 (age 28)
Julie Van De Velde (BEL)	2 June 1993 (age 33)
Gladys Verhulst-Wild (FRA)	30 January 1997 (age 29)
Urška Žigart (SLO)	4 December 1996 (age 29)

== Major results ==
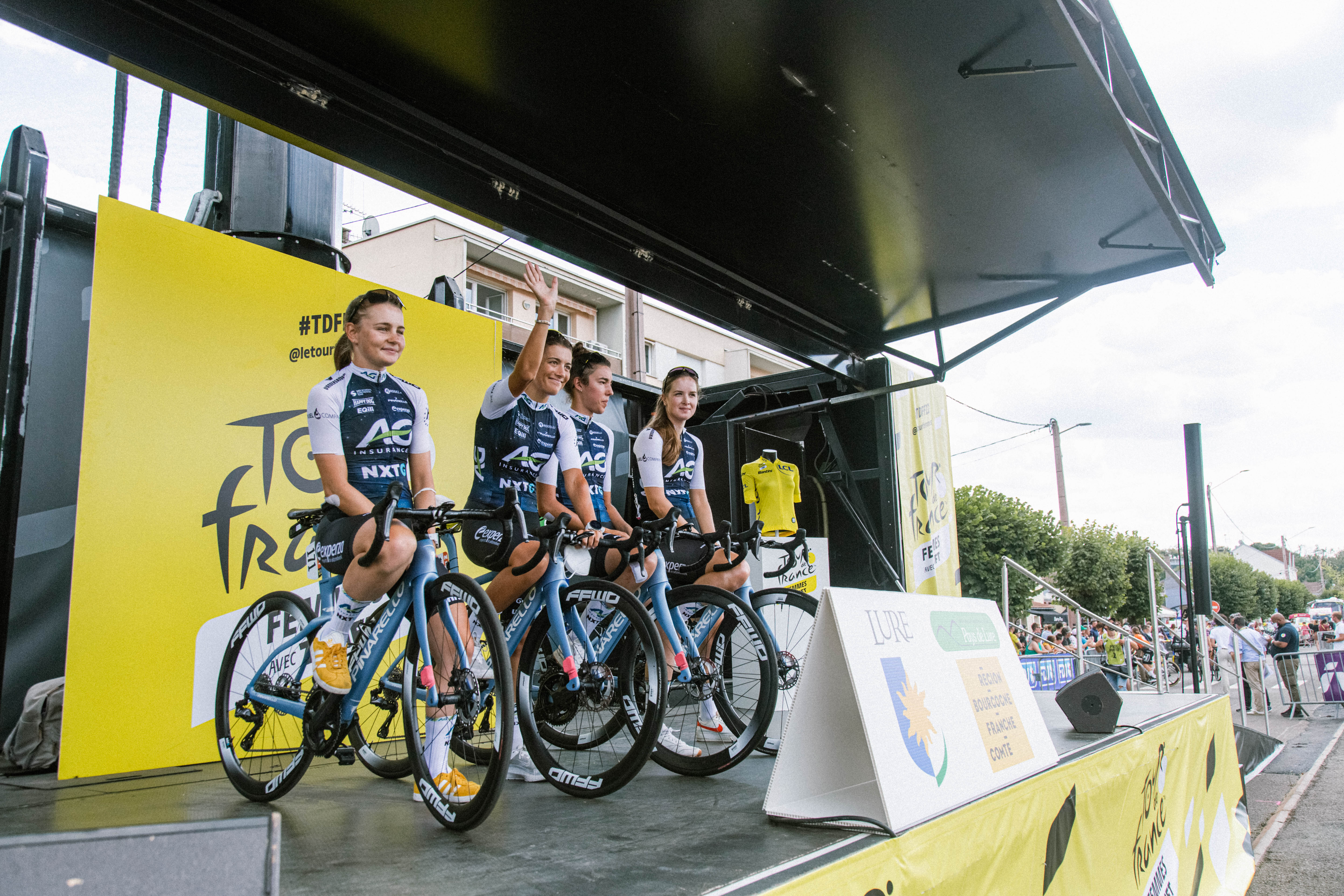
Four members of the team at the 2022 Tour de France Femmes.

2021
Stage 2a Baloise Ladies Tour, Charlotte Kool
Belgium U23 Time Trial Championships, Shari Bossuyt
Stage 2 (ITT) Watersley Women's Challenge, Shari Bossuyt
Grand Prix d'Isbergues, Charlotte Kool
2022
Belgium U23 Time Trial Championships, Britt Knaven
Grand Prix du Morbihan Féminin, Ally Wollaston
Stage 1 Belgium Tour, Ally Wollaston
Stage 2 Watersley Women's Challenge, Maud Rijnbeek
2024
Overall Tour Down Under, Sarah Gigante

1st Stage 1, Ally Wollaston
1st Stage 3, Sarah Gigante

Volta Ciclista a Catalunya Femenina

Points classification, Ally Wollaston
Mountains classification, Justine Ghekiere
1st Stages 1 & 3, Ally Wollaston

1st Stage 8 Giro d'Italia Women, Kim Le Court
Giro d'Italia Women Mountains Classification, Justine Ghekiere
1st Stage 7 Tour de France. Justine Ghekiere
Tour de France Mountains Classification, Justine Ghekiere
2025
1st Liège–Bastogne–Liège, Kim Le Court
1st Stage 1 Tour of Norway, Justine Ghekiere
1st Stage 1 Tour of Britain, Kim Le Court
Giro d'Italia Women Mountains Classification, Sarah Gigante
1st Stage 4 Giro d'Italia Women, Sarah Gigante
1st Stage 7 Giro d'Italia Women, Sarah Gigante
1st Stage 5 Tour de France, Kim Le Court

== Continental & national champions ==
2022
New Zealand Criterium, Ally Wollaston
Netherlands Track (Omnium), Mylène De Zoete
Oceania Track (Team Pursuit), Ally Wollaston
Oceania Track (Madison), Ally Wollaston
Oceania Track (Scratch Race), Ally Wollaston
Belgium U23 Time Trial, Britt Knaven
2023
New Zealand Criterium, Ally Wollaston
New Zealand U23 Time Trial, Ally Wollaston
New Zealand Road Race, Ally Wollaston
Estonia Time Trial, Laura Lizette Sander
2024
Spain Time Trial, Mireia Benito
Mauritius Time Trial, Kimberley Le Court
Mauritius Road Race, Kimberley Le Court
2025
Belgian National Road Race Championships, Justine Ghekiere
Spanish National Time Trial Championships, Mireia Benito
Mauritian National Road Race Championships, Kim Le Court
Mauritian National Time Trial Championships, Kim Le Court

== AG Insurance–NXTG U23 ==
AG Insurance–NXTG U23
Team information
- Registered: Belgium (2023–)
- Founded: 2023
- Status: UCI Women's Continental Team (2023–)
- Bicycles: Specialized

Team name history
- 2023–: AG Insurance–NXTG U23

AG Insurance–NXTG U23 is a Belgian women's road bicycle racing development team. The team was established in 2023.

== National Champions ==
2023
Belgium U23 Time Trial, Febe Jooris
Estonia Time Trial, Laura Lizette Sander
Estonia Road Race, Laura Lizette Sander
