= List of teams and cyclists in the 2025 La Vuelta Femenina =

List of cyclists

The following is a list of teams and cyclists who are participating in the 2025 La Vuelta Femenina.

Thirteen UCI Women's WorldTeams, four UCI Women's Pro Teams and four UCI Women's Continental Teams made up the 21 teams that participated in the race.

UCI Women's WorldTeams

- AG Insurance–Soudal
- Canyon//SRAM Zondacrypto
- FDJ–Suez
- Fenix–Deceuninck
- Human Powered Health
- Lidl–Trek
- Liv AlUla Jayco
- Movistar Team
- Team Picnic–PostNL
- Team SD Worx–Protime
- UAE Team ADQ
- Uno-X Mobility
- Visma–Lease a Bike

UCI Women's Pro Teams

- Arkéa–B&B Hotels Women
- Cofidis
- EF Education–Oatly
- Laboral Kutxa–Fundación Euskadi

UCI Women's Continental Teams

- BePink–Imatra–Bongioanni
- Eneicat–CMTeam
- Lotto Ladies
- Team Coop–Repsol

== Cyclists ==
Legend
No.	Starting number worn by the rider during the race
Pos.	Position in the general classification
Time	Deficit to the winner of the general classification
	Denotes the winner of the general classification
	Denotes the winner of the points classification
	Denotes the winner of the mountains classification
	Denotes riders that represent the winner of the team classification
	Denotes the winner of the combativity award
DNS	Denotes a rider who did not start a stage, followed by the stage before which she withdrew
DNF	Denotes a rider who did not finish a stage, followed by the stage in which she withdrew
DSQ	Denotes a rider who was disqualified from the race, followed by the stage in which this occurred
OTL	Denotes a rider finished outside the time limit, followed by the stage in which they did so
Ages correct as of Sunday 4 May 2025, the date on which the race began

=== By starting number ===
No.	Name	Nationality	Team	Age	Pos.	Time	Ref.
1	Demi Vollering	Netherlands	FDJ–Suez	28	1	19h 41' 32"	
2	Juliette Labous	France	FDJ–Suez	26	5	+ 3' 24"	
3	Évita Muzic	France	FDJ–Suez	25	10	+ 5' 41"	
4	Loes Adegeest	Netherlands	FDJ–Suez	28	DNF-4	–	
5	Vittoria Guazzini	Italy	FDJ–Suez	24	84	+ 57' 35"	
6	Ally Wollaston	New Zealand	FDJ–Suez	24	52	+ 36' 50"	
7	Marie Le Net	France	FDJ–Suez	25	79	+ 53' 40"	
11	Anna van der Breggen	Netherlands	Team SD Worx–Protime	35	3	+ 1' 16"	
12	Mischa Bredewold	Netherlands	Team SD Worx–Protime	24	33	+ 21' 13"	
13	Elena Cecchini	Italy	Team SD Worx–Protime	32	78	+ 53' 31"	
14	Femke Gerritse	Netherlands	Team SD Worx–Protime	23	55	+ 39' 07"	
15	Mikayla Harvey	New Zealand	Team SD Worx–Protime	26	42	+ 28' 06"	
16	Femke Markus	Netherlands	Team SD Worx–Protime	28	58	+ 41' 29"	
17	Lisa van Belle	Netherlands	Team SD Worx–Protime	21	82	+ 55' 10"	
21	Erica Magnaldi	Italy	UAE Team ADQ	32	23	+ 12' 10"	
22	Lara Gillespie	Ireland	UAE Team ADQ	24	70	+ 48' 36"	
23	Elizabeth Holden	Great Britain	UAE Team ADQ	27	DNF-5	–	
24	Alena Ivanchenko		UAE Team ADQ	21	47	+ 31' 47"	
25	Greta Marturano	Italy	UAE Team ADQ	26	DNS-4	–	
26	Maëva Squiban	France	UAE Team ADQ	23	61	+ 41' 49"	
31	Emma Norsgaard	Denmark	Lidl–Trek	25	75	+ 53' 20"	
32	Elizabeth Deignan	Great Britain	Lidl–Trek	36	DNF-7	–	
33	Niamh Fisher-Black	New Zealand	Lidl–Trek	24	6	+ 3' 25"	
34	Anna Henderson	Great Britain	Lidl–Trek	26	37	+ 23' 47"	
35	Riejanne Markus	Netherlands	Lidl–Trek	30	13	+ 6' 07"	
36	Ellen van Dijk	Netherlands	Lidl–Trek	38	59	+ 41' 29"	
37	Shirin van Anrooij	Netherlands	Lidl–Trek	23	20	+ 9' 18"	
41	Cédrine Kerbaol	France	EF Education–Oatly	23	4	+ 2' 34"	
42	Letizia Borghesi	Italy	EF Education–Oatly	26	62	+ 44' 39"	
43	Henrietta Christie	New Zealand	EF Education–Oatly	23	71	+ 50' 02"	
44	Kristen Faulkner	United States	EF Education–Oatly	32	50	+ 34' 16"	
45	Sarah Roy	Australia	EF Education–Oatly	39	DNF-7	–	
46	Magdeleine Vallieres	Canada	EF Education–Oatly	23	30	+ 16' 34"	
47	Babette van der Wolf	Netherlands	EF Education–Oatly	21	DNF-7	–	
51	Neve Bradbury	Australia	Canyon//SRAM Zondacrypto	23	DNF-7	–	
52	Justyna Czapla	Germany	Canyon//SRAM Zondacrypto	21	72	+ 51' 18"	
53	Chloé Dygert	United States	Canyon//SRAM Zondacrypto	28	DNS-3	–	
54	Anastasiya Kolesava		Canyon//SRAM Zondacrypto	24	99	+ 1h 08' 48"	
55	Katarzyna Niewiadoma	Poland	Canyon//SRAM Zondacrypto	30	11	+ 5' 57"	
56	Agnieszka Skalniak-Sójka	Poland	Canyon//SRAM Zondacrypto	28	53	+ 37' 27"	
57	Maike van der Duin	Netherlands	Canyon//SRAM Zondacrypto	23	DNF-7	–	
61	Mavi García	Spain	Liv AlUla Jayco	41	18	+ 8' 07"	
62	Georgia Baker	Australia	Liv AlUla Jayco	30	DNS-3	–	
63	Jeanne Korevaar	Netherlands	Liv AlUla Jayco	28	67	+ 47' 26"	
64	Amber Pate	Australia	Liv AlUla Jayco	30	76	+ 53' 25"	
65	Josie Talbot	Australia	Liv AlUla Jayco	28	57	+ 40' 17"	
66	Monica Trinca Colonel	Italy	Liv AlUla Jayco	25	7	+ 4' 07"	
67	Letizia Paternoster	Italy	Liv AlUla Jayco	25	80	+ 54' 21"	
71	Yara Kastelijn	Netherlands	Fenix–Deceuninck	27	8	+ 5' 20"	
72	Ceylin del Carmen Alvarado	Netherlands	Fenix–Deceuninck	26	65	+ 45' 48"	
73	Millie Couzens	Great Britain	Fenix–Deceuninck	21	87	+ 58' 19"	
74	Flora Perkins	Great Britain	Fenix–Deceuninck	21	69	+ 48' 14"	
75	Pauliena Rooijakkers	Netherlands	Fenix–Deceuninck	31	29	+ 16' 15"	
76	Carina Schrempf	Austria	Fenix–Deceuninck	30	DNS-4	–	
77	Aniek van Alphen	Netherlands	Fenix–Deceuninck	26	106	+ 1h 20' 01"	
81	Marianne Vos	Netherlands	Visma–Lease a Bike	37	40	+ 26' 32"	
82	Pauline Ferrand-Prévot	France	Visma–Lease a Bike	33	DNS-5	–	
83	Femke de Vries	Netherlands	Visma–Lease a Bike	31	51	+ 36' 03"	
84	Marion Bunel	France	Visma–Lease a Bike	20	24	+ 12' 50"	
85	Maud Oudeman	Netherlands	Visma–Lease a Bike	21	35	+ 21' 23"	
86	Viktória Chladoňová	Slovakia	Visma–Lease a Bike	18	36	+ 21' 47"	
87	Imogen Wolff	Great Britain	Visma–Lease a Bike	19	66	+ 46' 47"	
91	Katrine Aalerud	Norway	Uno-X Mobility	30	19	+ 8' 20"	
92	Susanne Andersen	Norway	Uno-X Mobility	26	102	+ 1h 15' 13"	
93	Solbjørk Minke Anderson	Denmark	Uno-X Mobility	20	DNS-6	–	
94	Ingvild Gåskjenn	Norway	Uno-X Mobility	26	49	+ 34' 14"	
95	Anouska Koster	Netherlands	Uno-X Mobility	31	DNF-7	–	
96	Mie Bjørndal Ottestad	Norway	Uno-X Mobility	27	27	+ 14' 28"	
97	Linda Zanetti	Switzerland	Uno-X Mobility	23	DNS-7	–	
101	Olivia Baril	Canada	Movistar Team	27	94	+ 1h 04' 23"	
102	Cat Ferguson	Great Britain	Movistar Team	19	64	+ 45' 22"	
103	Ana Vitória Magalhães	Brazil	Movistar Team	24	48	+ 32' 25"	
104	Liane Lippert	Germany	Movistar Team	27	41	+ 27' 15"	
105	Sara Martín	Spain	Movistar Team	26	77	+ 53' 26"	
106	Mareille Meijering	Netherlands	Movistar Team	30	14	+ 7' 03"	
107	Marlen Reusser	Switzerland	Movistar Team	33	2	+ 1' 01"	
111	Ashleigh Moolman	South Africa	AG Insurance–Soudal	39	15	+ 7' 28"	
112	Mireia Benito	Spain	AG Insurance–Soudal	28	DNS-1	–	
113	Julia Borgström	Sweden	AG Insurance–Soudal	23	74	+ 52' 22"	
114	Justine Ghekiere	Belgium	AG Insurance–Soudal	28	34	+ 21' 15"	
115	Marthe Goossens	Belgium	AG Insurance–Soudal	23	88	+ 58' 42"	
116	Nicole Steigenga	Netherlands	AG Insurance–Soudal	27	83	+ 55' 23"	
117	Julie Van de Velde	Belgium	AG Insurance–Soudal	31	56	+ 39' 17"	
121	Thalita de Jong	Netherlands	Human Powered Health	31	16	+ 7' 49"	
122	Romy Kasper	Germany	Human Powered Health	36	DNF-7	–	
123	Barbara Malcotti	Italy	Human Powered Health	25	22	+ 10' 29"	
124	Mona Mitterwallner	Austria	Human Powered Health	23	DNS-4	–	
125	Marit Raaijmakers	Netherlands	Human Powered Health	25	28	+ 15' 20"	
126	Lily Williams	United States	Human Powered Health	30	DNF-7	–	
127	Silvia Zanardi	Italy	Human Powered Health	25	100	+ 1h 09' 10"	
131	Nienke Vinke	Netherlands	Team Picnic–PostNL	20	9	+ 5' 40"	
132	Eleonora Ciabocco	Italy	Team Picnic–PostNL	21	17	+ 7' 53"	
133	Pfeiffer Georgi	Great Britain	Team Picnic–PostNL	24	43	+ 28' 41"	
134	Megan Jastrab	United States	Team Picnic–PostNL	23	60	+ 41' 35"	
135	Franziska Koch	Germany	Team Picnic–PostNL	24	32	+ 19' 16"	
136	Josie Nelson	Great Britain	Team Picnic–PostNL	23	98	+ 1h 08' 40"	
137	Mara Roldan	Canada	Team Picnic–PostNL	21	25	+ 13' 47"	
141	Ane Santesteban	Spain	Laboral Kutxa–Fundación Euskadi	34	63	+ 45' 06"	
142	Yuliia Biriukova	Ukraine	Laboral Kutxa–Fundación Euskadi	27	31	+ 16' 52"	
143	Arianna Fidanza	Italy	Laboral Kutxa–Fundación Euskadi	30	DNS-7	–	
144	Usoa Ostolaza	Spain	Laboral Kutxa–Fundación Euskadi	27	12	+ 5' 57"	
145	Debora Silvestri	Italy	Laboral Kutxa–Fundación Euskadi	26	DNF-7	–	
146	Alba Teruel	Spain	Laboral Kutxa–Fundación Euskadi	28	DNF-7	–	
147	Laura Tomasi	Italy	Laboral Kutxa–Fundación Euskadi	25	DNS-4	–	
151	Valentina Cavallar	Austria	Arkéa–B&B Hotels Women	24	26	+ 14' 08"	
152	Laura Asencio	France	Arkéa–B&B Hotels Women	26	DNS-4	–	
153	Maaike Coljé	Netherlands	Arkéa–B&B Hotels Women	28	86	+ 57' 57"	
154	Michaela Drummond	New Zealand	Arkéa–B&B Hotels Women	27	DNF-7	–	
155	Emma Fahlin	Sweden	Arkéa–B&B Hotels Women	36	DNF-4	–	
156	Titia Ryo	France	Arkéa–B&B Hotels Women	20	38	+ 25' 08"	
157	Maurène Trégouët	France	Arkéa–B&B Hotels Women	21	109	+ 1h 26' 32"	
161	Martina Alzini	Italy	Cofidis	28	95	+ 1h 04' 56"	
162	Marion Borras	France	Cofidis	27	105	+ 1h 19' 08"	
163	Eugenia Bujak	Slovenia	Cofidis	35	89	+ 59' 53"	
164	Amalie Dideriksen	Denmark	Cofidis	28	93	+ 1h 04' 02"	
165	Špela Kern	Slovenia	Cofidis	35	DNF-5	–	
166	Clara Koppenburg	Germany	Cofidis	29	91	+ 1h 03' 11"	
167	Nikola Nosková	Czechia	Cofidis	27	73	+ 52' 11"	
171	Stine Dale	Norway	Team Coop–Repsol	26	DNS-6	–	
172	India Grangier	France	Team Coop–Repsol	25	45	+ 30' 11"	
173	Tiril Jørgensen	Norway	Team Coop–Repsol	24	39	+ 26' 13"	
174	Stina Kagevi	Sweden	Team Coop–Repsol	19	21	+ 10' 19"	
175	Magdalene Lind	Norway	Team Coop–Repsol	22	DNS-7	–	
176	Laura Lizette Sander	Estonia	Team Coop–Repsol	20	DNS-3	–	
177	Aidi Gerde Tuisk	Estonia	Team Coop–Repsol	23	112	+ 1h 41' 16"	
181	Nora Jenčušová	Slovakia	BePink–Imatra–Bongioanni	23	103	+ 1h 17' 26"	
182	Andrea Casagranda	Italy	BePink–Imatra–Bongioanni	20	90	+ 1h 00' 09"	
183	Marina Garau	Spain	BePink–Imatra–Bongioanni	22	111	+ 1h 34' 46"	
184	Linda Laporta	Italy	BePink–Imatra–Bongioanni	25	DNF-7	–	
185	Aileen Schweikart	Germany	BePink–Imatra–Bongioanni	29	44	+ 29' 59"	
186	Meike Uiterwijk Winkel	Netherlands	BePink–Imatra–Bongioanni	25	97	+ 1h 05' 42"	
187	Elisa Valtulini	Italy	BePink–Imatra–Bongioanni	20	81	+ 54' 35"	
191	Ariana Gilabert	Spain	Eneicat–CMTeam	25	54	+ 38' 06"	
192	Ainara Albert	Spain	Eneicat–CMTeam	21	104	+ 1h 17' 31"	
193	Andrea Alzate	Colombia	Eneicat–CMTeam	28	108	+ 1h 25' 38"	
194	Daniela Campos	Portugal	Eneicat–CMTeam	23	DNF-7	–	
195	Angie Mariana Lodoño	Colombia	Eneicat–CMTeam	19	96	+ 1h 05' 13"	
196	Claudia San Justo	Spain	Eneicat–CMTeam	21	110	+ 1h 27' 46"	
197	Nicole Steinmetz	United States	Eneicat–CMTeam	21	68	+ 47' 47"	
201	Audrey De Keersmaeker	Belgium	Lotto Ladies	25	DNS-5	–	
202	Maureen Arens	Netherlands	Lotto Ladies	22	107	+ 1h 21' 28"	
203	Dina Boels	Belgium	Lotto Ladies	20	101	+ 1h 10' 30"	
204	Esmée Gielkens	Belgium	Lotto Ladies	23	DNF-5	–	
205	Romina Hinojosa	Mexico	Lotto Ladies	22	46	+ 31' 19"	
206	Lea Lin Teutenberg	Germany	Lotto Ladies	25	92	+ 1h 03' 57"	
207	Anna van Wersch	Netherlands	Lotto Ladies	23	85	+ 57' 41"	

=== By team ===
(France) FDJ–Suez (TFS)
No.	Rider	Pos.
1	Demi Vollering (NED)	1
2	Juliette Labous (FRA)	5
3	Évita Muzic (FRA)	10
4	Loes Adegeest (NED)	DNF-4
5	Vittoria Guazzini (ITA)	84
6	Ally Wollaston (NZL)	52
7	Marie Le Net (FRA)	79

(Netherlands) Team SD Worx–Protime (SDW)
No.	Rider	Pos.
11	Anna van der Breggen (NED)	3
12	Mischa Bredewold (NED)	34
13	Elena Cecchini (ITA)	78
14	Femke Gerritse (NED)	55
15	Mikayla Harvey (NZL)	42
16	Femke Markus (NED)	58
17	Lisa van Belle (NED)	82

(United Arab Emirates) UAE Team ADQ (UAD)
No.	Rider	Pos.
21	Erica Magnaldi (ITA)	23
22	Lara Gillespie (IRL)	70
23	Elizabeth Holden (GBR)	DNF-5
24	Alena Ivanchenko	47
25	Greta Marturano (ITA)	DNS-4
26	Maëva Squiban (FRA)	61

(United States) Lidl–Trek (LTK)
No.	Rider	Pos.
31	Emma Norsgaard (DEN)	75
32	Elizabeth Deignan (GBR)	DNF-7
33	Niamh Fisher-Black (NZL)	6
34	Anna Henderson (GBR)	37
35	Riejanne Markus (NED)	13
36	Ellen van Dijk (NED)	59
37	Shirin van Anrooij (NED)	20

(United States) EF Education–Oatly (EFO)
No.	Rider	Pos.
41	Cédrine Kerbaol (FRA)	4
42	Letizia Borghesi (ITA)	62
43	Henrietta Christie (NZL)	71
44	Kristen Faulkner (USA)	50
45	Sarah Roy (AUS)	DNF-7
46	Magdeleine Vallieres (CAN)	30
47	Babette van der Wolf (NED)	DNF-7

(Germany) Canyon//SRAM Zondacrypto (CSZ)
No.	Rider	Pos.
51	Neve Bradbury (AUS)	DNF-7
52	Justyna Czapla (GER)	72
53	Chloé Dygert (USA)	DNS-3
54	Anastasiya Kolesava	99
55	Katarzyna Niewiadoma (POL)	11
56	Agnieszka Skalniak-Sójka (POL)	53
57	Maike van der Duin (NED)	DNF-7

(Australia) Liv AlUla Jayco (LIV)
No.	Rider	Pos.
61	Mavi García (ESP)	18
62	Georgia Baker (AUS)	DNS-3
63	Jeanne Korevaar (NED)	67
64	Amber Pate (AUS)	76
65	Josie Talbot (AUS)	57
66	Monica Trinca Colonel (ITA)	7
67	Letizia Paternoster (ITA)	80

(Belgium) Fenix–Deceuninck (FDC)
No.	Rider	Pos.
71	Yara Kastelijn (NED)	8
72	Ceylin del Carmen Alvarado (NED)	65
73	Millie Couzens (GBR)	87
74	Flora Perkins (GBR)	69
75	Pauliena Rooijakkers (NED)	29
76	Carina Schrempf (AUT)	DNS-4
77	Aniek van Alphen (NED)	106

(Netherlands) Visma–Lease a Bike (TVL)
No.	Rider	Pos.
81	Marianne Vos (NED)	40
82	Pauline Ferrand-Prévot (FRA)	DNS-5
83	Femke de Vries (NED)	51
84	Marion Bunel (FRA)	24
85	Maud Oudeman (NED)	35
86	Viktória Chladoňová (SVK)	36
87	Imogen Wolff (GBR)	66

(Norway) Uno-X Mobility (UXM)
No.	Rider	Pos.
91	Katrine Aalerud (NOR)	19
92	Susanne Andersen (NOR)	102
93	Solbjørk Minke Anderson (DEN)	DNS-6
94	Ingvild Gåskjenn (NOR)	49
95	Anouska Koster (NED)	DNF-7
96	Mie Bjørndal Ottestad (NOR)	27
97	Linda Zanetti (SUI)	DNS-7

(Spain) Movistar Team (MOV)
No.	Rider	Pos.
101	Olivia Baril (CAN)	94
102	Cat Ferguson (GBR)	64
103	Ana Vitória Magalhães (BRA)	48
104	Liane Lippert (GER)	41
105	Sara Martín (ESP)	77
106	Mareille Meijering (NED)	14
107	Marlen Reusser (SUI)	2

(Belgium) AG Insurance–Soudal (AGS)
No.	Rider	Pos.
111	Ashleigh Moolman (RSA)	15
112	Mireia Benito (ESP)	DNS-1
113	Julia Borgström (SWE)	74
114	Justine Ghekiere (BEL)	34
115	Marthe Goossens (BEL)	88
116	Nicole Steigenga (NED)	83
117	Julie Van de Velde (BEL)	56

(United States) Human Powered Health (HPH)
No.	Rider	Pos.
121	Thalita de Jong (NED)	16
122	Romy Kasper (GER)	DNF-7
123	Barbara Malcotti (ITA)	22
124	Mona Mitterwallner (AUT)	DNS-4
125	Marit Raaijmakers (NED)	28
126	Lily Williams (USA)	DNF-7
127	Silvia Zanardi (ITA)	100

(Netherlands) Team Picnic–PostNL (TPP)
No.	Rider	Pos.
131	Nienke Vinke (NED)	9
132	Eleonora Ciabocco (ITA)	17
133	Pfeiffer Georgi (GBR)	43
134	Megan Jastrab (USA)	60
135	Franziska Koch (GER)	32
136	Josie Nelson (GBR)	98
137	Mara Roldan (CAN)	25

(Spain) Laboral Kutxa–Fundación Euskadi (LKF)
No.	Rider	Pos.
141	Ane Santesteban (ESP)	63
142	Yuliia Biriukova (UKR)	31
143	Arianna Fidanza (ITA)	DNS-7
144	Usoa Ostolaza (ESP)	12
145	Debora Silvestri (ITA)	DNF-7
146	Alba Teruel (ESP)	DNF-7
147	Laura Tomasi (ITA)	DNS-4

(France) Arkéa–B&B Hotels Women (ARK)
No.	Rider	Pos.
151	Valentina Cavallar (AUT)	26
152	Laura Asencio (FRA)	DNS-4
153	Maaike Coljé (NED)	86
154	Michaela Drummond (NZL)	DNF-7
155	Emilia Fahlin (SWE)	DNF-4
156	Titia Ryo (FRA)	38
157	Maurène Trégouët (FRA)	109

(France) Cofidis (CWT)
No.	Rider	Pos.
161	Martina Alzini (ITA)	95
162	Marion Borras (FRA)	105
163	Eugenia Bujak (SLO)	89
164	Amalie Dideriksen (DEN)	93
165	Špela Kern (SLO)	DNF-5
166	Clara Koppenburg (GER)	91
167	Nikola Nosková (CZE)	73

(Norway) Team Coop–Repsol (REP)
No.	Rider	Pos.
171	Stine Dale (NOR)	DNS-6
172	India Grangier (FRA)	45
173	Tiril Jørgensen (NOR)	39
174	Stina Kagevi (SWE)	21
175	Magdalene Lind (NOR)	DNS-7
176	Laura Lizetta Sander (EST)	DNS-3
177	Aidi Gerde Tuisk (EST)	112

(Italy) BePink–Imatra–Bongioanni (BPK)
No.	Rider	Pos.
181	Nora Jenčušová (SVK)	103
182	Andrea Casagranda (ITA)	90
183	Marina Garau (ESP)	111
184	Linda Laporta (ITA)	DNF-7
185	Aileen Schweikart (GER)	44
186	Meike Uiterwijk Winkel (NED)	97
187	Elisa Valtulini (ITA)	81

(Spain) Eneicat–CMTeam (EIC)
No.	Rider	Pos.
191	Ariana Gilabert (ESP)	54
192	Ainara Albert (ESP)	104
193	Andrea Alzate (COL)	108
194	Daniela Campos (POR)	DNF-7
195	Angie Mariana Londoño (COL)	96
196	Claudia San Justo (ESP)	110
197	Nicole Steinmetz (USA)	68

(Belgium) Lotto Ladies (LOL)
No.	Rider	Pos.
201	Audrey De Keersmaeker (BEL)	DNS-5
202	Maureen Arens (NED)	107
203	Dina Boels (BEL)	101
204	Esmée Gielkens (BEL)	DNF-5
205	Romina Hinojosa (MEX)	46
206	Lea Lin Teutenberg (GER)	92
207	Anna van Wersch (NED)	85

=== By nationality ===
Country	No. of riders	Finished	Stage wins
Australia	5	2	
Austria	3	1	
Belgium	6	4	
Brazil	1	1	
Canada	3	3	
Colombia	2	2	
Czechia	1	1	
Denmark	3	2	
Estonia	2	1	
France	12	10	
Germany	7	6	
Great Britain	9	7	
Ireland	1	1	
Italy	17	12	
Mexico	1	1	
Netherlands	30	26	6 (Femke Gerritse, Anna van der Breggen, Demi Vollering x2, Marianne Vos x2)
New Zealand	5	4	
Norway	7	5	
Poland	2	2	
Portugal	1	0	
Slovakia	2	2	
Slovenia	2	1	
South Africa	1	1	
Spain	10	8	
Sweden	3	2	
Switzerland	2	1	
Ukraine	1	1	
United States	5	3	
	2	2	
Total	146	112	6
