= 2025 La Vuelta Femenina =

Women's cycling race in Spain

2025 UCI Women's World Tour, race 15 of 27
- Route of the 2025 La Vuelta Femenina

Race details
- Dates: 4 – 10 May
- Stages: 7
- Distance: 748 km (465 mi)
- Winning time: 19h 41' 32"

Results
Jersey awarded to the overall winner	Winner	Demi Vollering (NED)	(FDJ–Suez)
	Second	Marlen Reusser (SUI)	(Movistar Team)
	Third	Anna van der Breggen (NED)	(Team SD Worx–Protime)
Jersey awarded to the points classification winner	Points	Marianne Vos (NED)	(Visma–Lease a Bike)
Jersey awarded to the mountains classification winner	Mountains	Demi Vollering (NED)	(FDJ–Suez)
Jersey awarded to the combativity classification winner	Combativity	Anna van der Breggen (NED)	(Team SD Worx–Protime)
Jersey awarded to the team classification winner	Team	(France) FDJ–Suez	

The 2025 La Vuelta Femenina (officially La Vuelta Femenina by Carrefour.es) was the third edition of La Vuelta Femenina, a cycling stage race that took place in Spain. The race took place from 4 to 10 May, and was the 15th event in the 2025 UCI Women's World Tour.

The general classification was won by Dutch rider Demi Vollering of FDJ–Suez for the second time, with Vollering winning both mountain stages on her way to victory. The mountains classification was also won by Vollering for the second time. Second place in the general classification was taken by Marlen Reusser of Movistar Team, with Anna van der Breggen of Team SD Worx–Protime taking third place.

The points classification was won by Marianne Vos of Visma–Lease a Bike for the third year in succession, with Vos also winning stages 2 and 6. The teams classification was won by FDJ–Suez.

== Teams ==
Thirteen UCI Women's WorldTeams, four UCI Women's Pro Teams and four UCI Women's Continental Teams made up the 21 teams that participated in the race.

UCI Women's WorldTeams

- AG Insurance–Soudal
- Canyon//SRAM Zondacrypto
- FDJ–Suez
- Fenix–Deceuninck
- Human Powered Health
- Lidl–Trek
- Liv AlUla Jayco
- Movistar Team
- Team Picnic–PostNL
- Team SD Worx–Protime
- UAE Team ADQ
- Uno-X Mobility
- Visma–Lease a Bike

UCI Women's Pro Teams

- Arkéa–B&B Hotels Women
- Cofidis
- EF Education–Oatly
- Laboral Kutxa–Fundación Euskadi

UCI Women's Continental Teams

- BePink–Imatra–Bongioanni
- Eneicat–CMTeam
- Lotto Ladies
- Team Coop–Repsol

== Route ==
The route was announced in March 2025. Starting in Barcelona in Catalonia, the route heads westwards across Spain to finish in Asturias. The route was one day and 119 km (74 mi) shorter than the 2024 edition, however the final stage was considered to be more challenging than previous editions, with a summit finish at Cotobello – a 10km climb at an average gradient of 8%.

Stage characteristics
Stage	Date	Course	Distance	Type	Winner
1	4 May	Barcelona	8 km (5.0 mi)	Team time trial	(United States) Lidl–Trek
2	5 May	Molins de Rei to Sant Boi de Llobregat	99 km (62 mi)	Hilly stage	Marianne Vos (NED)
3	6 May	Barbastro to Huesca	132 km (82 mi)	Flat stage	Femke Gerritse (NED)
4	7 May	Pedrola to Borja	111 km (69 mi)	Medium-mountain stage	Anna van der Breggen (NED)
5	8 May	Golmayo to Lagunas de Neila	120 km (75 mi)	Mountain stage	Demi Vollering (NED)
6	9 May	Becerril de Campos to Baltanás	126 km (78 mi)	Flat stage	Marianne Vos (NED)
7	10 May	La Robla to Cotobello	152 km (94 mi)	Mountain stage	Demi Vollering (NED)
Total			748 km (465 mi)		

== Classification leadership table ==
Stage	Winner	General classification	Points classification	Mountains classification	Team classification	Combativity award
1	Lidl–Trek	Ellen van Dijk	not awarded	not awarded	Lidl–Trek	Anna Henderson
2	Marianne Vos	Letizia Paternoster	Marianne Vos	Ane Santesteban	Lidl–Trek	Elena Cecchini
3	Femke Gerritse	Femke Gerritse	Marianne Vos	Ane Santesteban	Lidl–Trek	Maaike Coljé
4	Anna van der Breggen	Femke Gerritse	Marianne Vos	Évita Muzic	Team SD Worx–Protime	India Grangier
5	Demi Vollering	Demi Vollering	Marianne Vos	Demi Vollering (Note: On stages 6 & 7, Évita Muzic, who was second in the mountains classification, wore the polkadot jersey, because first-placed Demi Vollering wore the red jersey as the general classification leader.)	FDJ–Suez	Arianna Fidanza
6	Marianne Vos	Demi Vollering	Marianne Vos	Demi Vollering	FDJ–Suez	Nicole Steigenga
7	Demi Vollering	Demi Vollering	Marianne Vos	Demi Vollering	FDJ–Suez	Anna van der Breggen
Final		Demi Vollering	Marianne Vos	Demi Vollering	FDJ–Suez	Anna van der Breggen

== Classification standings ==
Legend
Denotes the winner of the general classification	Denotes the winner of the team classification
Denotes the winner of the points classification	Denotes the winner of the combativity award
Denotes the winner of the mountains classification	

=== General classification ===
Final general classification (1–10)
Rank	Rider	Team	Time
1	Demi Vollering (NED)	FDJ–Suez	19h 41' 32"
2	Marlen Reusser (SUI)	Movistar Team	+ 1' 01"
3	Anna van der Breggen (NED)	Team SD Worx–Protime	+ 1' 16"
4	Cédrine Kerbaol (FRA)	EF Education–Oatly	+ 2' 34"
5	Juliette Labous (FRA)	FDJ–Suez	+ 3' 24"
6	Niamh Fisher-Black (NZL)	Lidl–Trek	+ 3' 25"
7	Monica Trinca Colonel (ITA)	Liv AlUla Jayco	+ 4' 07"
8	Yara Kastelijn (NED)	Fenix–Deceuninck	+ 5' 20"
9	Nienke Vinke (NED)	Team Picnic–PostNL	+ 5' 40"
10	Évita Muzic (FRA)	FDJ–Suez	+ 5' 41"

=== Points classification ===
Final points classification (1–10)
Rank	Rider	Team	Points
1	Marianne Vos (NED)	Visma–Lease a Bike	245
2	Demi Vollering (NED)	FDJ–Suez	149
3	Femke Gerritse (NED)	Team SD Worx–Protime	132
4	Marlen Reusser (SUI)	Movistar Team	96
5	Anna van der Breggen (NED)	Team SD Worx–Protime	91
6	Cédrine Kerbaol (FRA)	EF Education–Oatly	83
7	Mischa Bredewold (NED)	Team SD Worx–Protime	60
8	Letizia Paternoster (ITA)	Liv AlUla Jayco	57
9	Monica Trinca Colonel (ITA)	Liv AlUla Jayco	50
10	Agnieszka Skalniak-Sójka (POL)	Canyon//SRAM Zondacrypto	46

=== Mountains classification ===
Final mountains classification (1–10)
Rank	Rider	Team	Points
1	Demi Vollering (NED)	FDJ–Suez	48
2	Marlen Reusser (SUI)	Movistar Team	37
3	Évita Muzic (FRA)	FDJ–Suez	36
4	Femke de Vries (NED)	Visma–Lease a Bike	22
5	Anna van der Breggen (NED)	Team SD Worx–Protime	20
6	Justine Ghekiere (BEL)	AG Insurance–Soudal	18
7	Niamh Fisher-Black (NZL)	Lidl–Trek	16
8	Cédrine Kerbaol (FRA)	EF Education–Oatly	12
9	Juliette Labous (FRA)	FDJ–Suez	12
10	Ane Santesteban (ESP)	Laboral Kutxa–Fundación Euskadi	10

=== Team classification ===
Final team classification (1–10)
Rank	Team	Time
1	(France) FDJ–Suez	58h 54' 57"
2	(United States) Lidl–Trek	+ 9' 09"
3	(Netherlands) Team Picnic–PostNL	+ 17' 39"
4	(Netherlands) Visma–Lease a Bike	+ 23' 01"
5	(United States) Human Powered Health	+ 23' 34"
6	(Spain) Movistar Team	+ 24' 43"
7	(Australia) Liv AlUla Jayco	+ 37' 01"
8	(Netherlands) Team SD Worx–Protime	+ 37' 02"
9	(Spain) Laboral Kutxa–Fundación Euskadi	+ 40' 14"
10	(United States) EF Education–Oatly	+ 41' 52"
