= 2025 La Vuelta Femenina, Stage 1 to Stage 7 =

Cycling race stages

The 2025 La Vuelta Femenina (officially La Vuelta Femenina by Carrefour.es) is the third edition of La Vuelta Femenina, a cycling stage race currently taking place in Spain. The race is taking place from 4 to 10 May 2025, and is the 15th event in the 2025 UCI Women's World Tour.

== Classification standings ==
Legend
Denotes the leader of the general classification	Denotes the leader of the team classification
Denotes the leader of the points classification	Denotes the winner of the combativity award
Denotes the leader of the mountains classification	

== Stage 1 ==
4 May 2025 — Barcelona, 8 km (5.0 mi) (TTT)

Stage 1 Result
Rank	Team	Time
1	(United States) Lidl–Trek	9' 30"
2	(Netherlands) Team SD Worx–Protime	+ 3"
3	(Australia) Liv AlUla Jayco	+ 3"
4	(France) FDJ–Suez	+ 6"
5	(Germany) Canyon//SRAM Zondacrypto	+ 8"
6	(Netherlands) Team Picnic–PostNL	+ 9"
7	(Spain) Movistar Team	+ 16"
8	(United States) EF Education–Oatly	+ 16"
9	(United States) Human Powered Health	+ 20"
10	(Netherlands) Visma–Lease a Bike	+ 21"

General classification after Stage 1
Rank	Rider	Team	Time
1	Ellen van Dijk (NED)	Lidl–Trek	9' 30"
2	Riejanne Markus (NED)	Lidl–Trek	+ 0"
3	Niamh Fisher-Black (NZL)	Lidl–Trek	+ 0"
4	Anna Henderson (GBR)	Lidl–Trek	+ 0"
5	Shirin van Anrooij (NED)	Lidl–Trek	+ 0"
6	Mischa Bredewold (NED)	Team SD Worx–Protime	+ 3"
7	Anna van der Breggen (NED)	Team SD Worx–Protime	+ 3"
8	Femke Gerritse (NED)	Team SD Worx–Protime	+ 3"
9	Femke Markus (NED)	Team SD Worx–Protime	+ 3"
10	Georgia Baker (AUS)	Liv AlUla Jayco	+ 3"

== Stage 2 ==
5 May 2025 — Molins de Rei to Sant Boi de Llobregat, 99 km (62 mi)

Stage 2 Result
Rank	Rider	Team	Time
1	Marianne Vos (NED)	Visma–Lease a Bike	2h 35' 13"
2	Letizia Paternoster (ITA)	Liv AlUla Jayco	+ 0"
3	Letizia Borghesi (ITA)	EF Education–Oatly	+ 0"
4	Anna Henderson (GBR)	Lidl–Trek	+ 0"
5	Monica Trinca Colonel (ITA)	Liv AlUla Jayco	+ 0"
6	Ally Wollaston (NZL)	FDJ–Suez	+ 0"
7	Franziska Koch (GER)	Team Picnic–PostNL	+ 0"
8	Katarzyna Niewiadoma (POL)	Canyon//SRAM Zondacrypto	+ 0"
9	Cédrine Kerbaol (FRA)	EF Education–Oatly	+ 0"
10	Laura Tomasi (ITA)	Laboral Kutxa–Fundación Euskadi	+ 0"

General classification after Stage 2
Rank	Rider	Team	Time
1	Letizia Paternoster (ITA)	Liv AlUla Jayco	2h 44' 40"
2	Femke Gerritse (NED)	Team SD Worx–Protime	+ 2"
3	Anna Henderson (GBR)	Lidl–Trek	+ 3"
4	Niamh Fisher-Black (NZL)	Lidl–Trek	+ 3"
5	Riejanne Markus (NED)	Lidl–Trek	+ 3"
6	Shirin van Anrooij (NED)	Lidl–Trek	+ 3"
7	Monica Trinca Colonel (ITA)	Liv AlUla Jayco	+ 6"
8	Anna van der Breggen (NED)	Team SD Worx–Protime	+ 6"
9	Mischa Bredewold (NED)	Team SD Worx–Protime	+ 6"
10	Mavi García (ESP)	Liv AlUla Jayco	+ 6"

== Stage 3 ==
6 May 2025 — Barbastro to Huesca, 132 km (82 mi)

Stage 3 Result
Rank	Rider	Team	Time
1	Femke Gerritse (NED)	Team SD Worx–Protime	3h 23' 24"
2	Marianne Vos (NED)	Visma–Lease a Bike	+ 0"
3	Linda Zanetti (SUI)	Uno-X Mobility	+ 0"
4	Mischa Bredewold (NED)	Team SD Worx–Protime	+ 0"
5	Megan Jastrab (USA)	Team Picnic–PostNL	+ 0"
6	Vittoria Guazzini (ITA)	FDJ–Suez	+ 0"
7	Letizia Paternoster (ITA)	Liv AlUla Jayco	+ 0"
8	Katarzyna Niewiadoma (POL)	Canyon//SRAM Zondacrypto	+ 0"
9	Cat Ferguson (GBR)	Movistar Team	+ 0"
10	Agnieszka Skalniak-Sójka (POL)	Canyon//SRAM Zondacrypto	+ 0"

General classification after Stage 3
Rank	Rider	Team	Time
1	Femke Gerritse (NED)	Team SD Worx–Protime	6h 07' 50"
2	Marianne Vos (NED)	Visma–Lease a Bike	+ 12"
3	Letizia Paternoster (ITA)	Liv AlUla Jayco	+ 12"
4	Anna Henderson (GBR)	Lidl–Trek	+ 17"
5	Riejanne Markus (NED)	Lidl–Trek	+ 17"
6	Niamh Fisher-Black (NZL)	Lidl–Trek	+ 17"
7	Monica Trinca Colonel (ITA)	Liv AlUla Jayco	+ 20"
8	Mischa Bredewold (NED)	Team SD Worx–Protime	+ 20"
9	Anna van der Breggen (NED)	Team SD Worx–Protime	+ 20"
10	Mavi García (ESP)	Liv AlUla Jayco	+ 20"

== Stage 4 ==
7 May 2025 — Pedrola to Borja, 111 km (69 mi)

Stage 4 Result
Rank	Rider	Team	Time
1	Anna van der Breggen (NED)	Team SD Worx–Protime	2h 49' 55"
2	Marianne Vos (NED)	Visma–Lease a Bike	+ 12"
3	Demi Vollering (NED)	FDJ–Suez	+ 12"
4	Monica Trinca Colonel (ITA)	Liv AlUla Jayco	+ 12"
5	Cédrine Kerbaol (FRA)	EF Education–Oatly	+ 12"
6	Liane Lippert (GER)	Movistar Team	+ 12"
7	Femke Gerritse (NED)	Team SD Worx–Protime	+ 12"
8	Marlen Reusser (SUI)	Movistar Team	+ 12"
9	Katarzyna Niewiadoma (POL)	Canyon//SRAM Zondacrypto	+ 12"
10	Riejanne Markus (NED)	Lidl–Trek	+ 12"

General classification after Stage 4
Rank	Rider	Team	Time
1	Femke Gerritse (NED)	Team SD Worx–Protime	8h 57' 51"
2	Anna van der Breggen (NED)	Team SD Worx–Protime	+ 4"
3	Marianne Vos (NED)	Visma–Lease a Bike	+ 10"
4	Demi Vollering (NED)	FDJ–Suez	+ 12"
5	Riejanne Markus (NED)	Lidl–Trek	+ 23"
6	Niamh Fisher-Black (NZL)	Lidl–Trek	+ 23"
7	Monica Trinca Colonel (ITA)	Liv AlUla Jayco	+ 26"
8	Mischa Bredewold (NED)	Team SD Worx–Protime	+ 26"
9	Mavi García (ESP)	Liv AlUla Jayco	+ 26"
10	Evita Muzic (FRA)	FDJ–Suez	+ 29"

== Stage 5 ==
8 May 2025 — Golmayo to Lagunas de Neila, 120 km (75 mi)

Stage 5 Result
Rank	Rider	Team	Time
1	Demi Vollering (NED)	FDJ–Suez	3h 19' 57"
2	Marlen Reusser (SUI)	Movistar Team	+ 24"
3	Anna van der Breggen (NED)	Team SD Worx–Protime	+ 56"
4	Pauliena Rooijakkers (NED)	Fenix–Deceuninck	+ 1' 10"
5	Usoa Ostolaza (ESP)	Laboral Kutxa–Fundación Euskadi	+ 1' 20"
6	Cédrine Kerbaol (FRA)	EF Education–Oatly	+ 1' 23"
7	Marion Bunel (FRA)	Visma–Lease a Bike	+ 1' 27"
8	Juliette Labous (FRA)	FDJ–Suez	+ 1' 51"
9	Riejanne Markus (NED)	Lidl–Trek	+ 1' 53"
10	Valentina Cavallar (AUT)	Arkéa–B&B Hotels Women	+ 2' 01"

General classification after Stage 5
Rank	Rider	Team	Time
1	Demi Vollering (NED)	FDJ–Suez	12h 17' 59"
2	Anna van der Breggen (NED)	Team SD Worx–Protime	+ 45"
3	Marlen Reusser (SUI)	Movistar Team	+ 46"
4	Cédrine Kerbaol (FRA)	EF Education–Oatly	+ 1' 49"
5	Riejanne Markus (NED)	Lidl–Trek	+ 2' 05"
6	Juliette Labous (FRA)	FDJ–Suez	+ 2' 09"
7	Niamh Fisher-Black (NZL)	Lidl–Trek	+ 2' 19"
8	Usoa Ostolaza (ESP)	Laboral Kutxa–Fundación Euskadi	+ 2' 26"
9	Monica Trinca Colonel (ITA)	Liv AlUla Jayco	+ 2' 35"
10	Yara Kastelijn (NED)	Fenix–Deceuninck	+ 2' 57"

== Stage 6 ==
9 May 2025 — Becerril de Campos to Baltanás, 126 km (78 mi)

Stage 6 Result
Rank	Rider	Team	Time
1	Marianne Vos (NED)	Visma–Lease a Bike	3h 00' 09"
2	Mischa Bredewold (NED)	Team SD Worx–Protime	+ 0"
3	Ally Wollaston (NZL)	FDJ–Suez	+ 0"
4	Lara Gillespie (IRL)	UAE Team ADQ	+ 0"
5	Nicole Steigenga (NED)	AG Insurance–Soudal	+ 0"
6	Agnieszka Skalniak-Sójka (POL)	Canyon//SRAM Zondacrypto	+ 0"
7	Cat Ferguson (GBR)	Movistar Team	+ 0"
8	Megan Jastrab (USA)	Team Picnic–PostNL	+ 0"
9	Usoa Ostolaza (ESP)	Laboral Kutxa–Fundación Euskadi	+ 0"
10	Imogen Wolff (GBR)	Visma–Lease a Bike	+ 0"

General classification after Stage 6
Rank	Rider	Team	Time
1	Demi Vollering (NED)	FDJ–Suez	15h 18' 08"
2	Anna van der Breggen (NED)	Team SD Worx–Protime	+ 45"
3	Marlen Reusser (SUI)	Movistar Team	+ 46"
4	Cédrine Kerbaol (FRA)	EF Education–Oatly	+ 1' 49"
5	Riejanne Markus (NED)	Lidl–Trek	+ 2' 05"
6	Juliette Labous (FRA)	FDJ–Suez	+ 2' 09"
7	Niamh Fisher-Black (NZL)	Lidl–Trek	+ 2' 19"
8	Usoa Ostolaza (ESP)	Laboral Kutxa–Fundación Euskadi	+ 2' 26"
9	Monica Trinca Colonel (ITA)	Liv AlUla Jayco	+ 2' 35"
10	Yara Kastelijn (NED)	Fenix–Deceuninck	+ 2' 57"

== Stage 7 ==
10 May 2025 — La Robla to Cotobello, 152 km (94 mi)

Stage 7 Result
Rank	Rider	Team	Time
1	Demi Vollering (NED)	FDJ–Suez	4h 23' 34"
2	Marlen Reusser (SUI)	Movistar Team	+ 11"
3	Anna van der Breggen (NED)	Team SD Worx–Protime	+ 25"
4	Cédrine Kerbaol (FRA)	EF Education–Oatly	+ 35"
5	Niamh Fisher-Black (NZL)	Lidl–Trek	+ 56"
6	Juliette Labous (FRA)	FDJ–Suez	+ 1' 05"
7	Monica Trinca Colonel (ITA)	Liv AlUla Jayco	+ 1' 22"
8	Évita Muzic (FRA)	FDJ–Suez	+ 1' 42"
9	Marion Bunel (FRA)	Visma–Lease a Bike	+ 1' 52"
10	Nienke Vinke (NED)	Team Picnic–PostNL	+ 2' 06"

General classification after Stage 7
Rank	Rider	Team	Time
1	Demi Vollering (NED)	FDJ–Suez	19h 41' 32"
2	Marlen Reusser (SUI)	Movistar Team	+ 1' 01"
3	Anna van der Breggen (NED)	Team SD Worx–Protime	+ 1' 16"
4	Cédrine Kerbaol (FRA)	EF Education–Oatly	+ 2' 34"
5	Juliette Labous (FRA)	FDJ–Suez	+ 3' 24"
6	Niamh Fisher-Black (NZL)	Lidl–Trek	+ 3' 25"
7	Monica Trinca Colonel (ITA)	Liv AlUla Jayco	+ 4' 07"
8	Yara Kastelijn (NED)	Fenix–Deceuninck	+ 5' 20"
9	Nienke Vinke (NED)	Team Picnic–PostNL	+ 5' 40"
10	Évita Muzic (FRA)	FDJ–Suez	+ 5' 41"
