= Baltanás =

Municipality in the province of Palencia, Spain

Coordinates: 41°56′N 4°15′W

- municipality
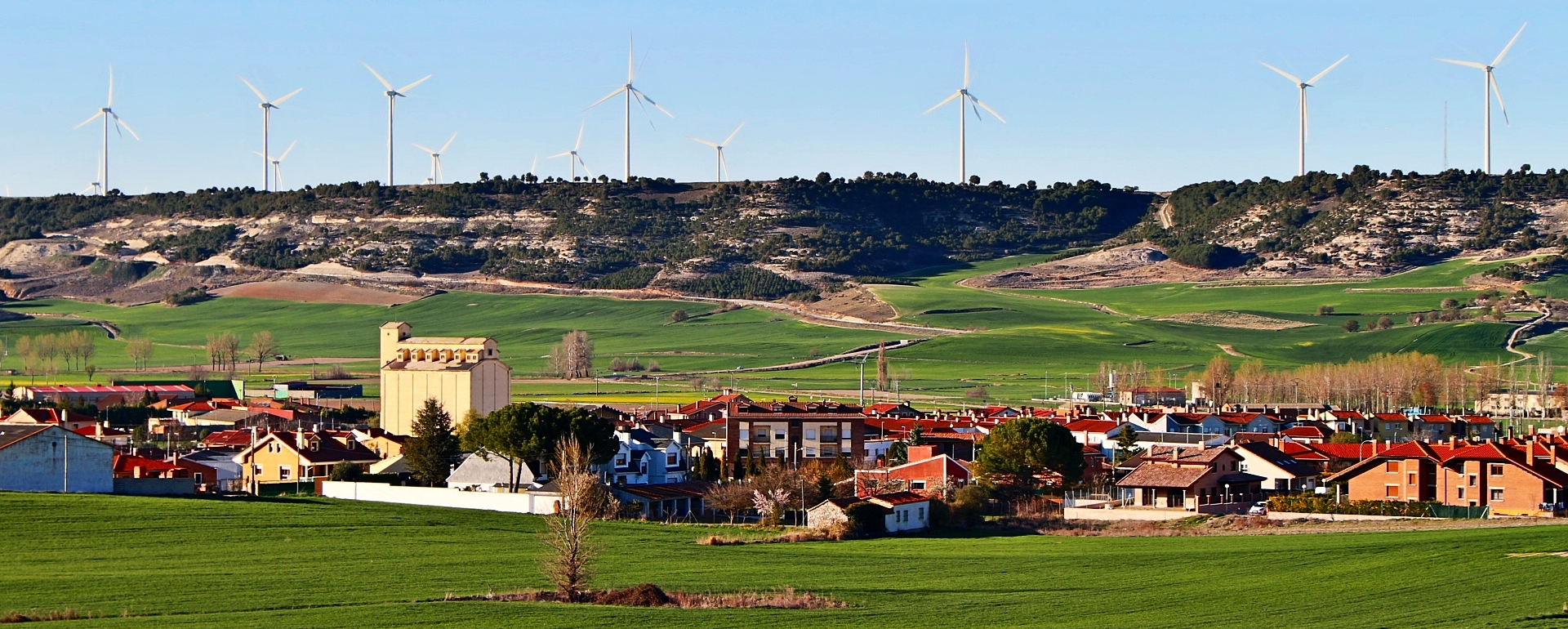

- Flag Coat of arms
- Interactive map of Baltanás
- Country: Spain
- Autonomous community: Castile and León
- Province: Palencia
- Municipality: Baltanás

Government
  - Mayoress: María José de la Fuente Fombellida

Area
  - Total: 158.85 km^{2} (61.33 sq mi)
- Elevation: 780 m (2,560 ft)

Population (2025-01-01)
  - Total: 1,226
  - Density: 7.718/km^{2} (19.99/sq mi)
- Time zone: UTC+1 (CET)
  - Summer (DST): UTC+2 (CEST)
- Website: www.baltanas.es

Baltanás is a municipality located in the province of Palencia, Castile and León, Spain. According to the 2021 census (INE), the municipality had a population of 1,219 inhabitants.

== Etymology ==
The name Baltanás is derived from the evolution of Valle de Atanasio (Atanasio Valley). During the reign of Alfonso VII, in the year 1135, it was commonly named "Valle de Valtanás". In the year 1145 the word "valley" disappeared. Later, over time, the initial "V" was replaced by a "B", becoming the current toponym, "Baltanás".

== History ==
The population was of approximately 3000 inhabitants before the Spanish Civil War, and was reduced considerably during that period. Unemployment and lack of food made numbers dwindle even further during the 1950s. In 2005, bodies from fallen Civil War soldiers were recovered in the area known as "El Portillo". It still serves as a centre of activity for the El Cerrato Shire's service sector, in the Aranda de Duero-Palencia highway.

The Catholic monarchs named it head of the Cerrato Merindad, an attribute that it maintains today. It continues to be the historic capital of the region of El Cerrato. Since 1974 the municipality includes the towns of Baltanás and Valdecañas de Cerrato, the latter hamlet built by decree dated February 21, 1974.

== Description ==
The town occupies an area of 158.85 km^{2}. It is the historical capital of the comarca of El Cerrato, located in the southeast of the province of Palencia. Its relief is the result of the erosion of several river valleys, and it is composed of several moors. Its climate is continental, characterized by extreme temperatures both in winter and summer.

Regarding architecture, there is a predominance of single-family homes of one or two floor, with aligned façades that form blocks. There is a great number of squares, and the most important one is Plaza de España, where the town hall is located. It also has some parks, of which the largest is called La Carolina.

== Cultural heritage ==
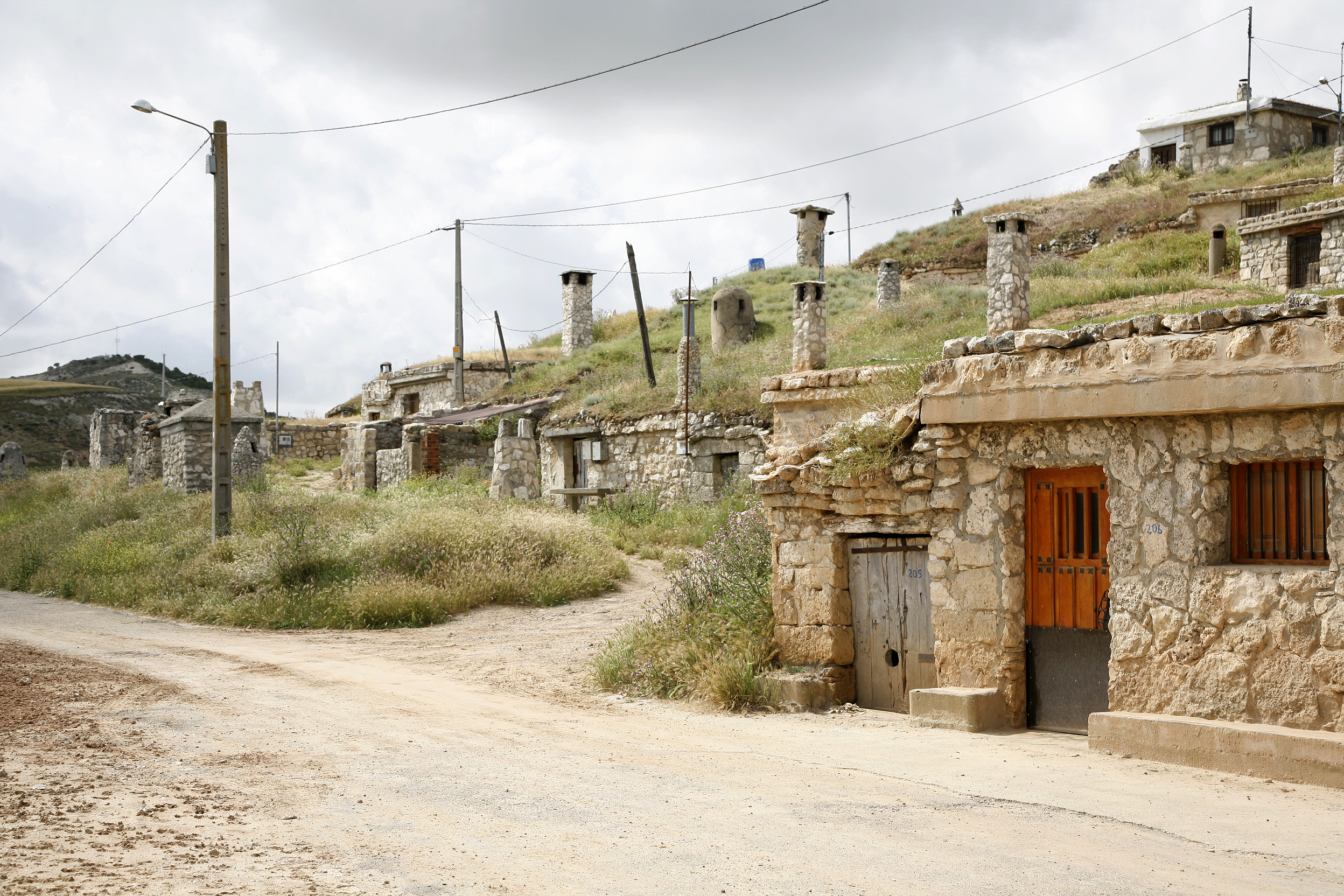
Wineries in Baltanás

Among its ethnological heritage, the Baltanás wineries are noteworthy. It is a complex made up of 374 underground cellars where wine is traditionally made and stored. They are located on a hill known as Cerro del Castillo. It is said that the famous Catalan architect Antoni Gaudí visited Baltanás and was inspired by its cellars to create the chimneys of his famous house known as La Pedrera.

== Gallery ==
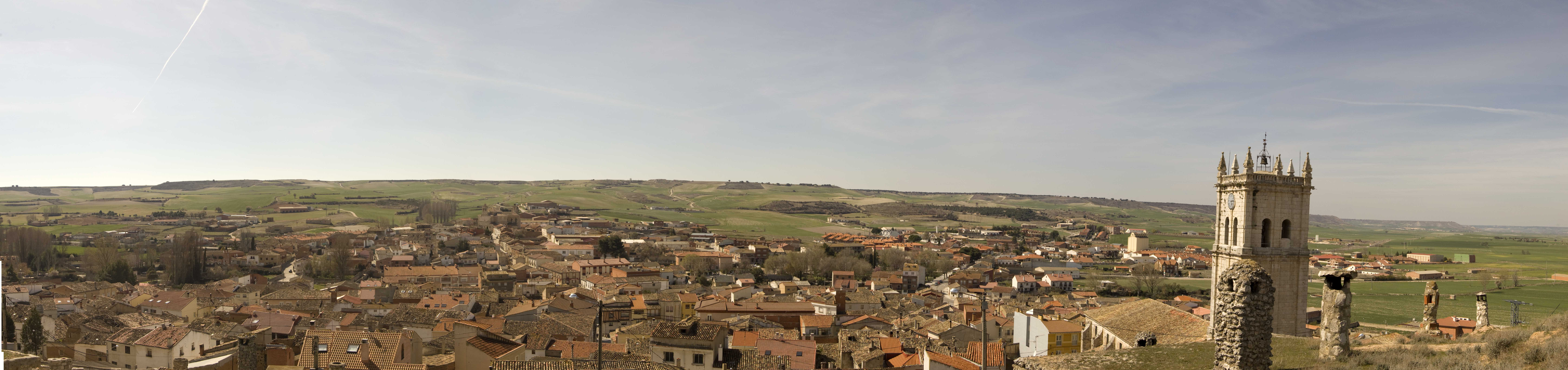
Panoramic view of Baltanás

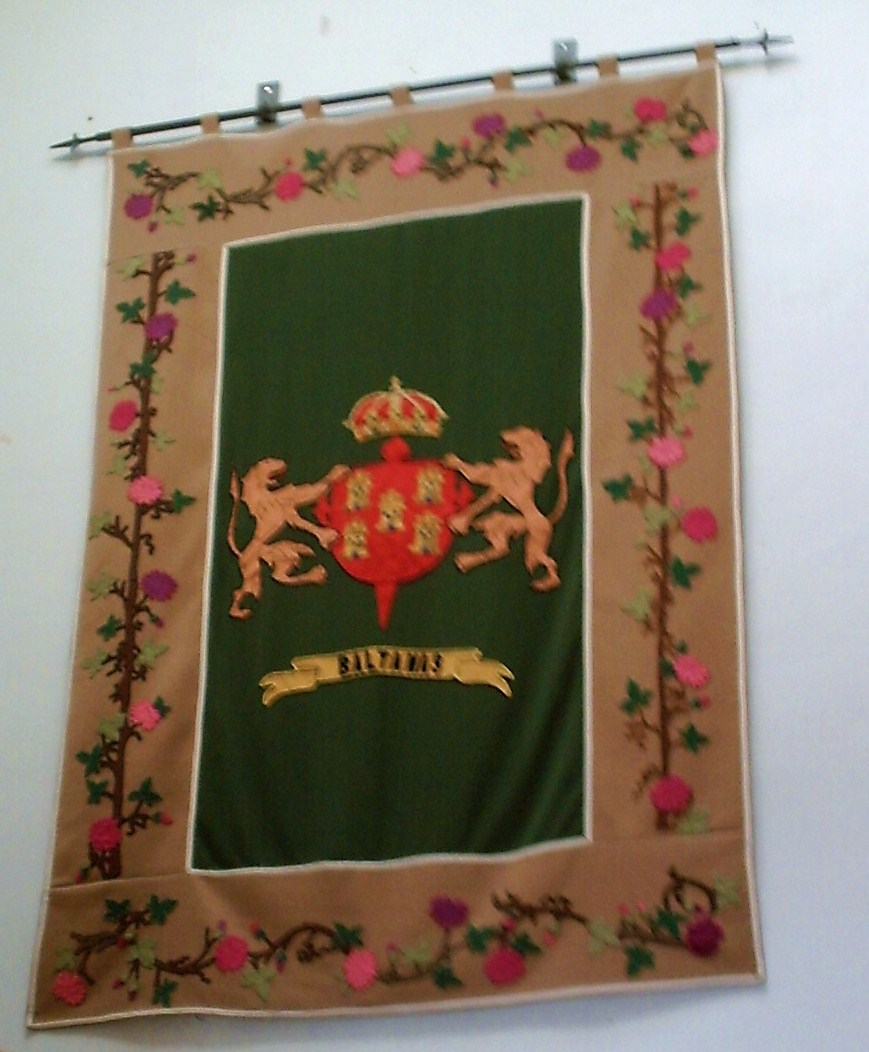
Baltanás shield at the Town Hall

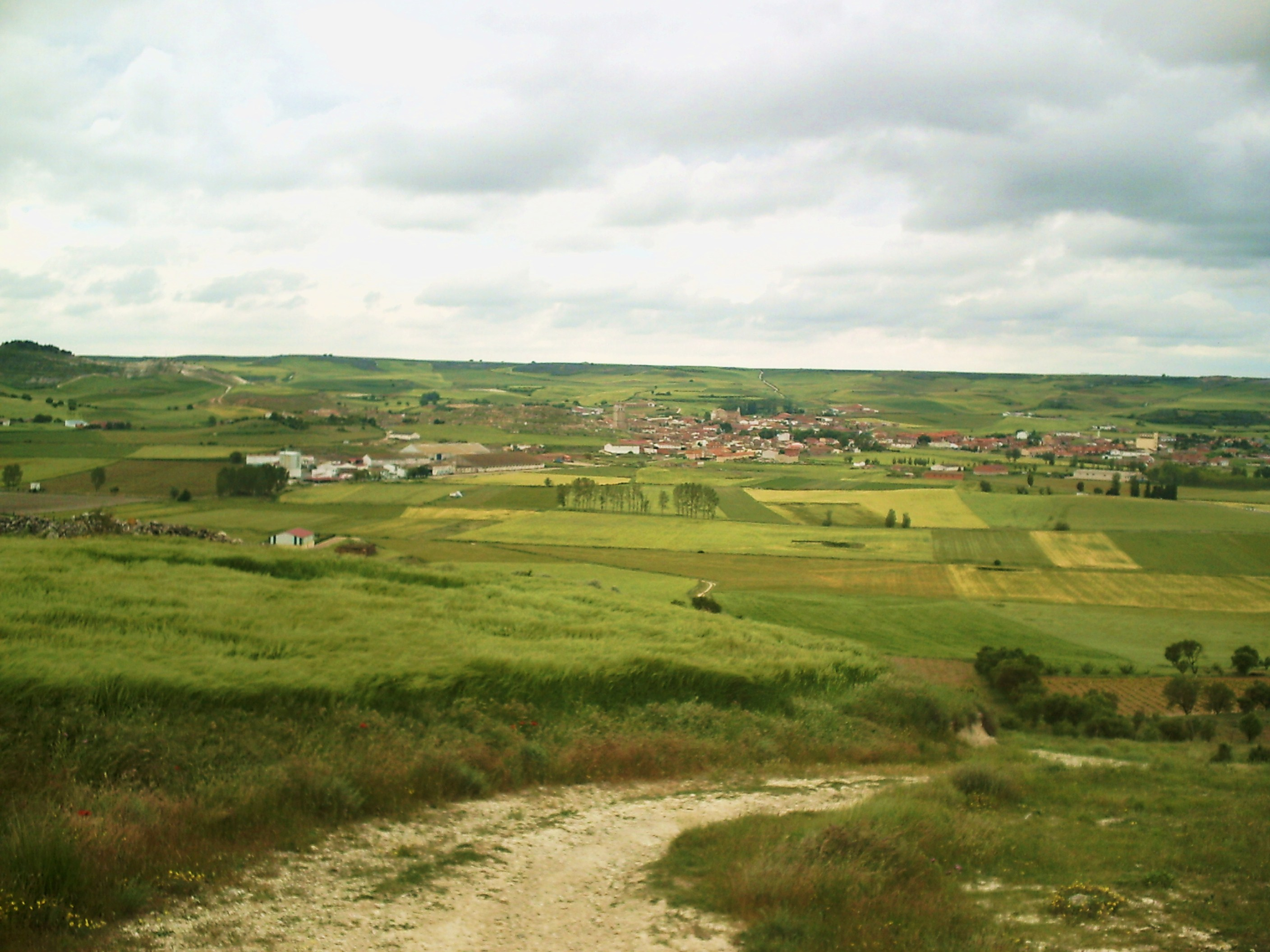
Panoramic view

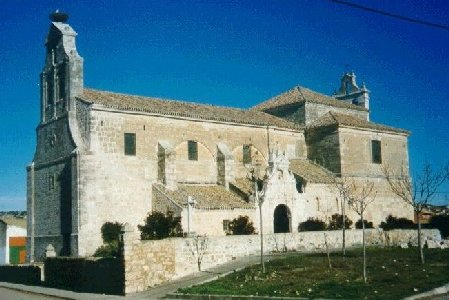
Virgin of Revilla Church

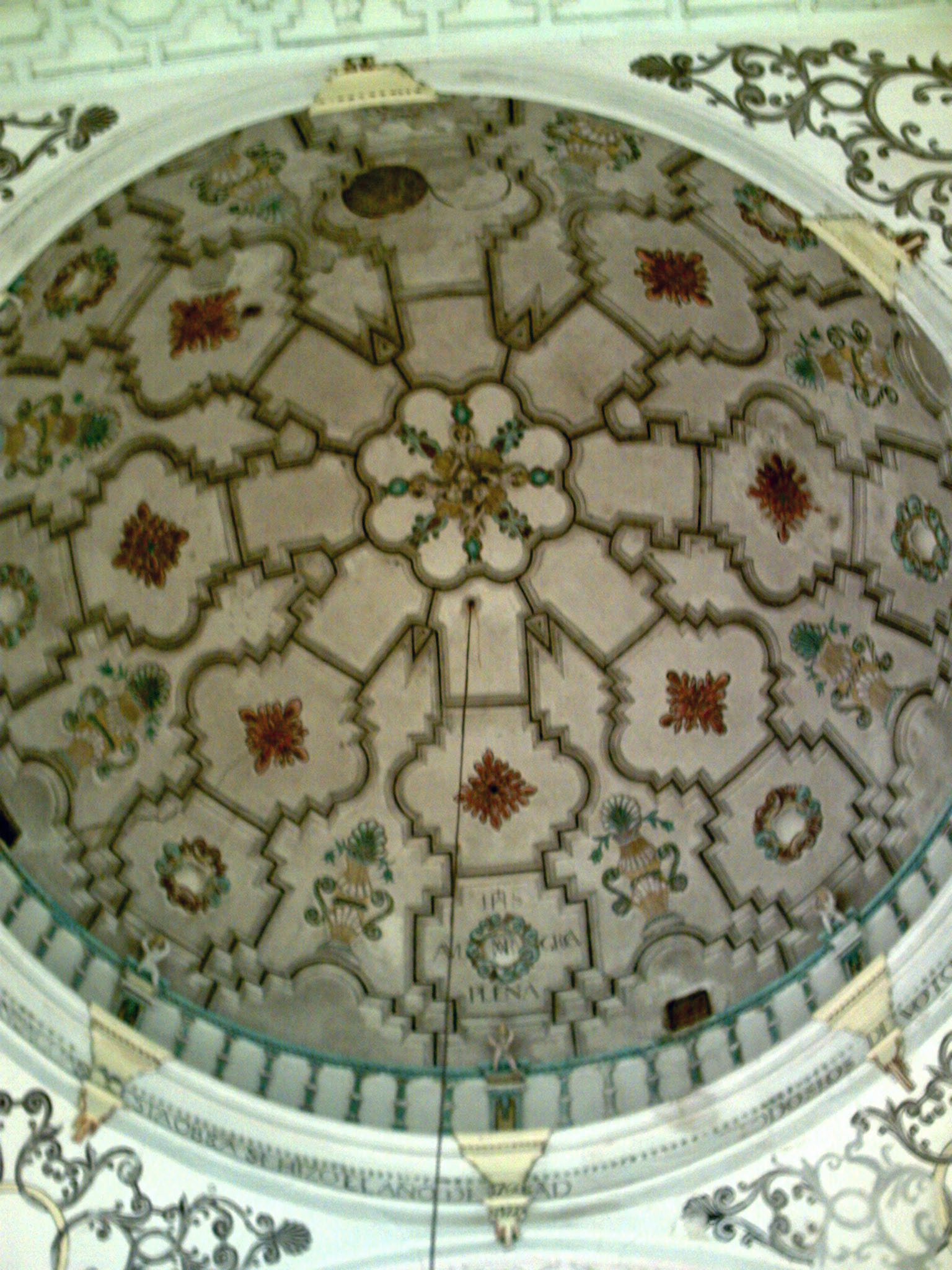
Virgin of Revilla Church's dome

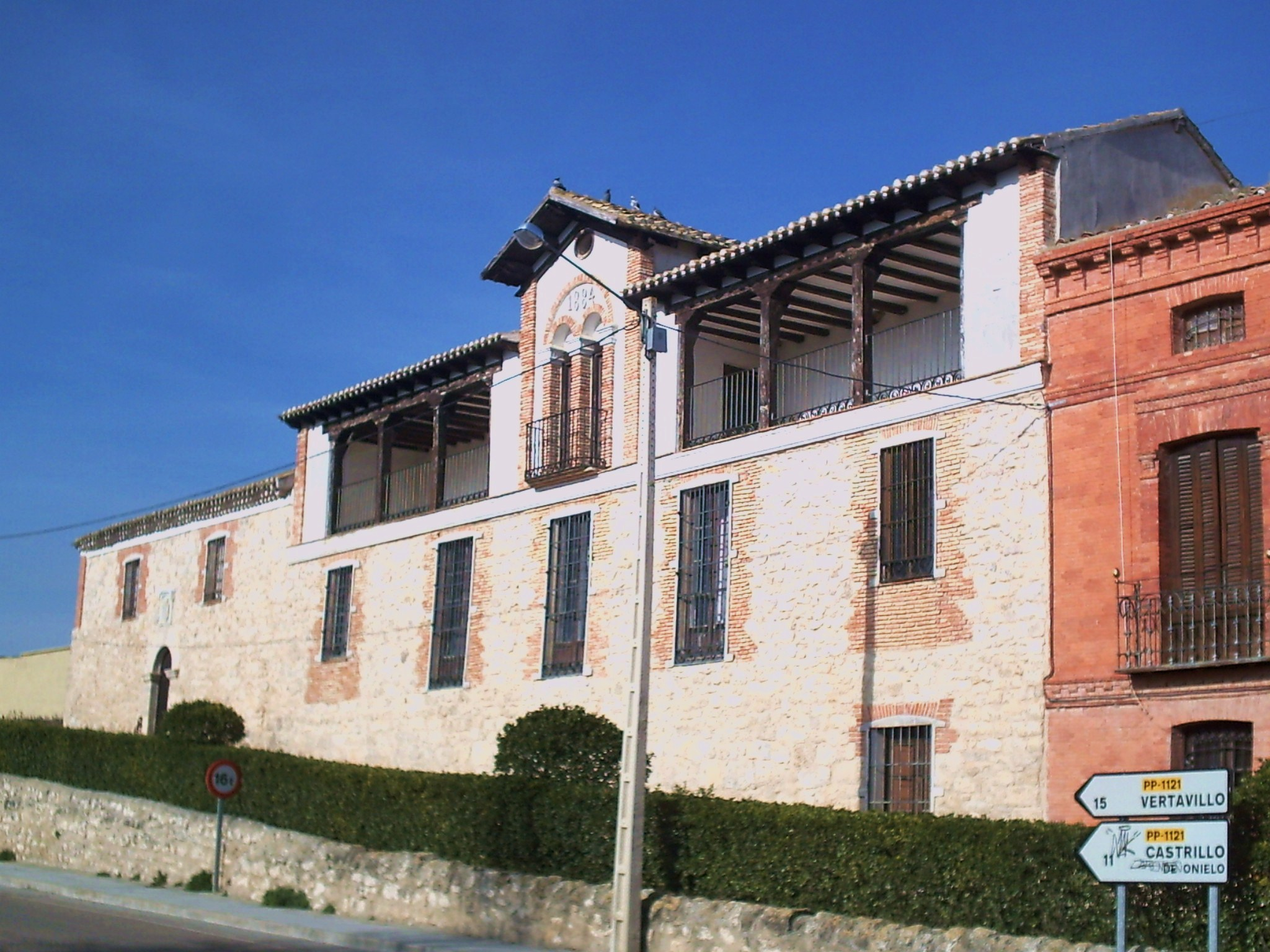
Monument House, b. 1884

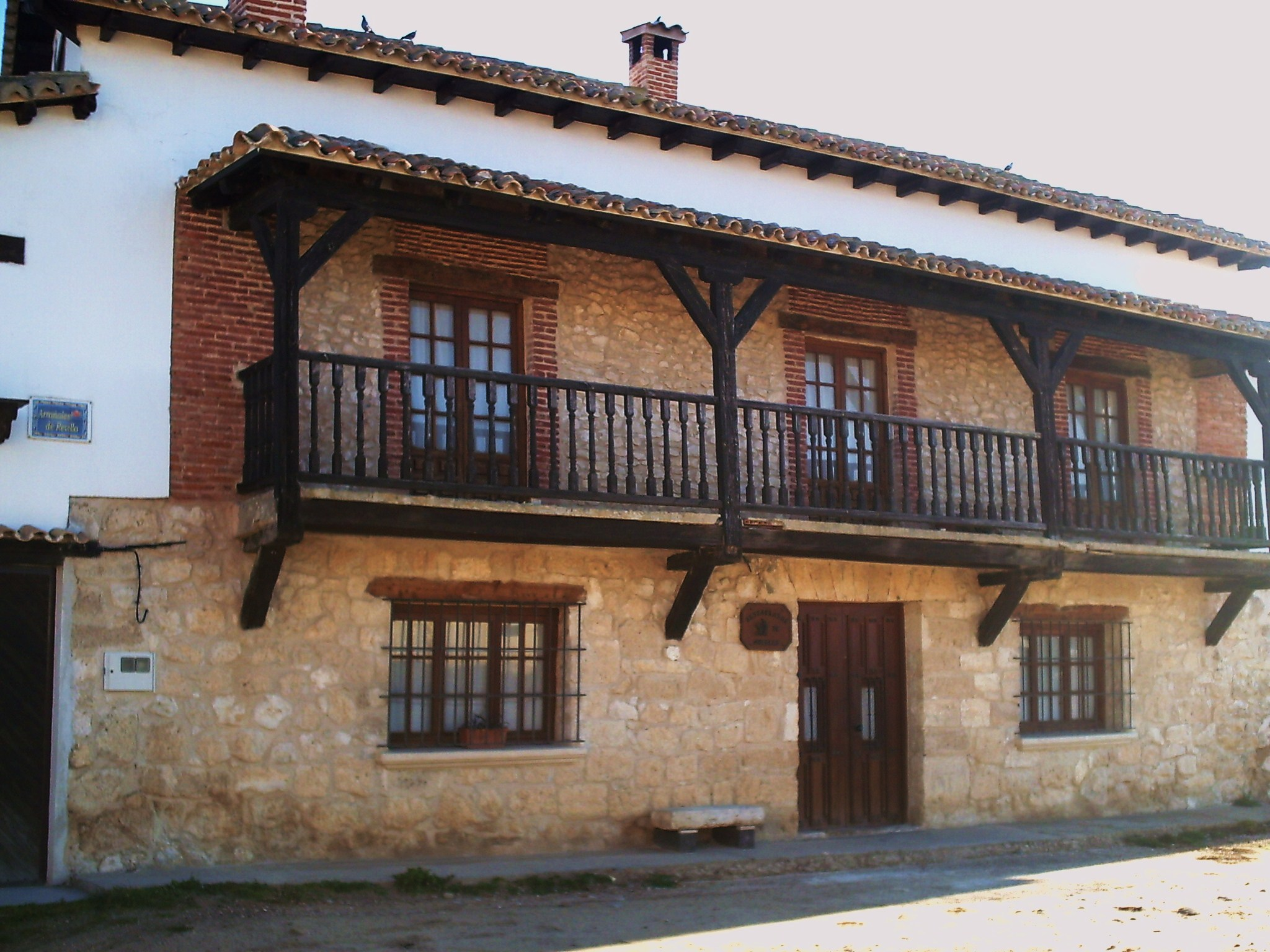
Traditional balcony

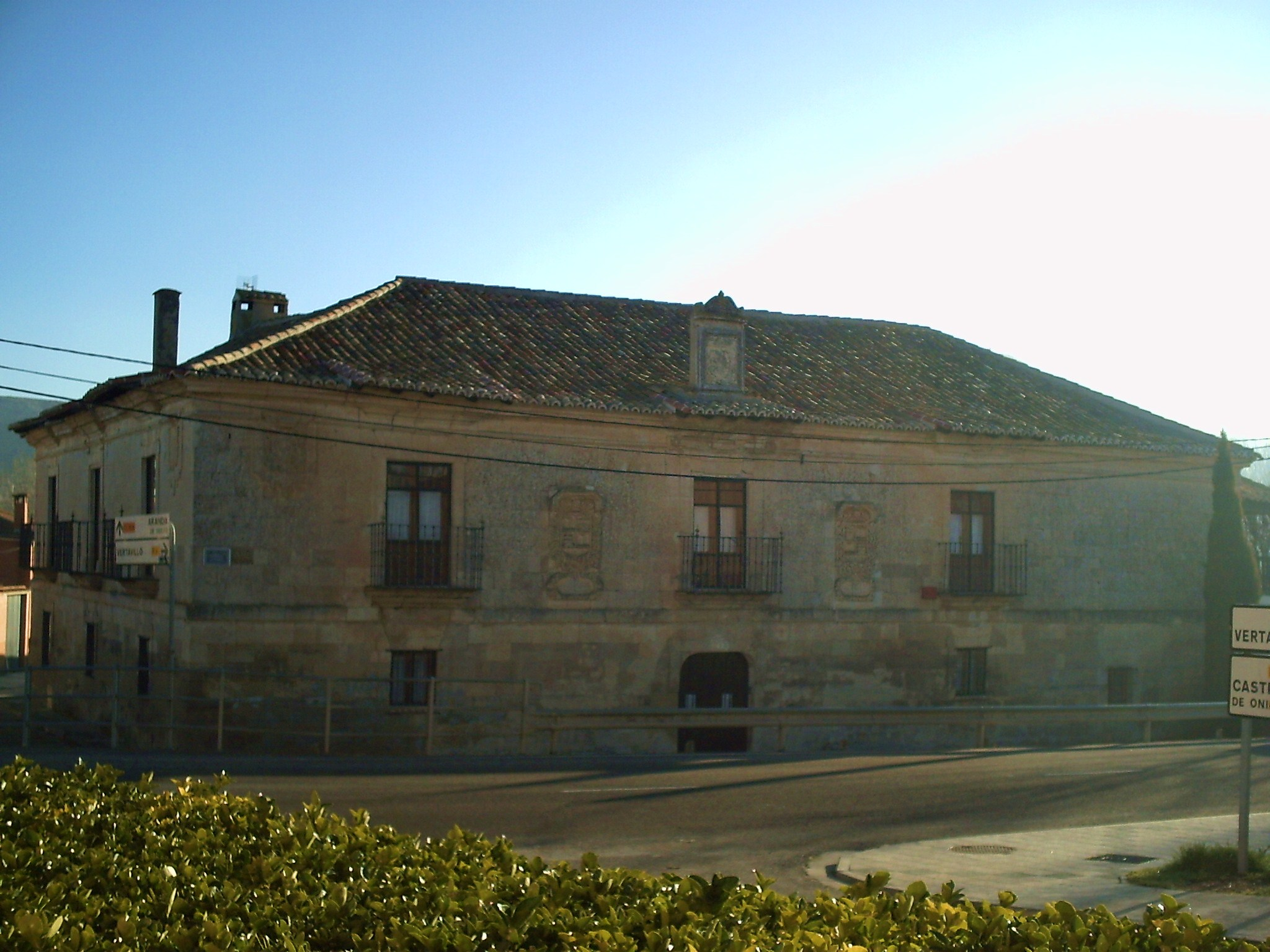
Monument House

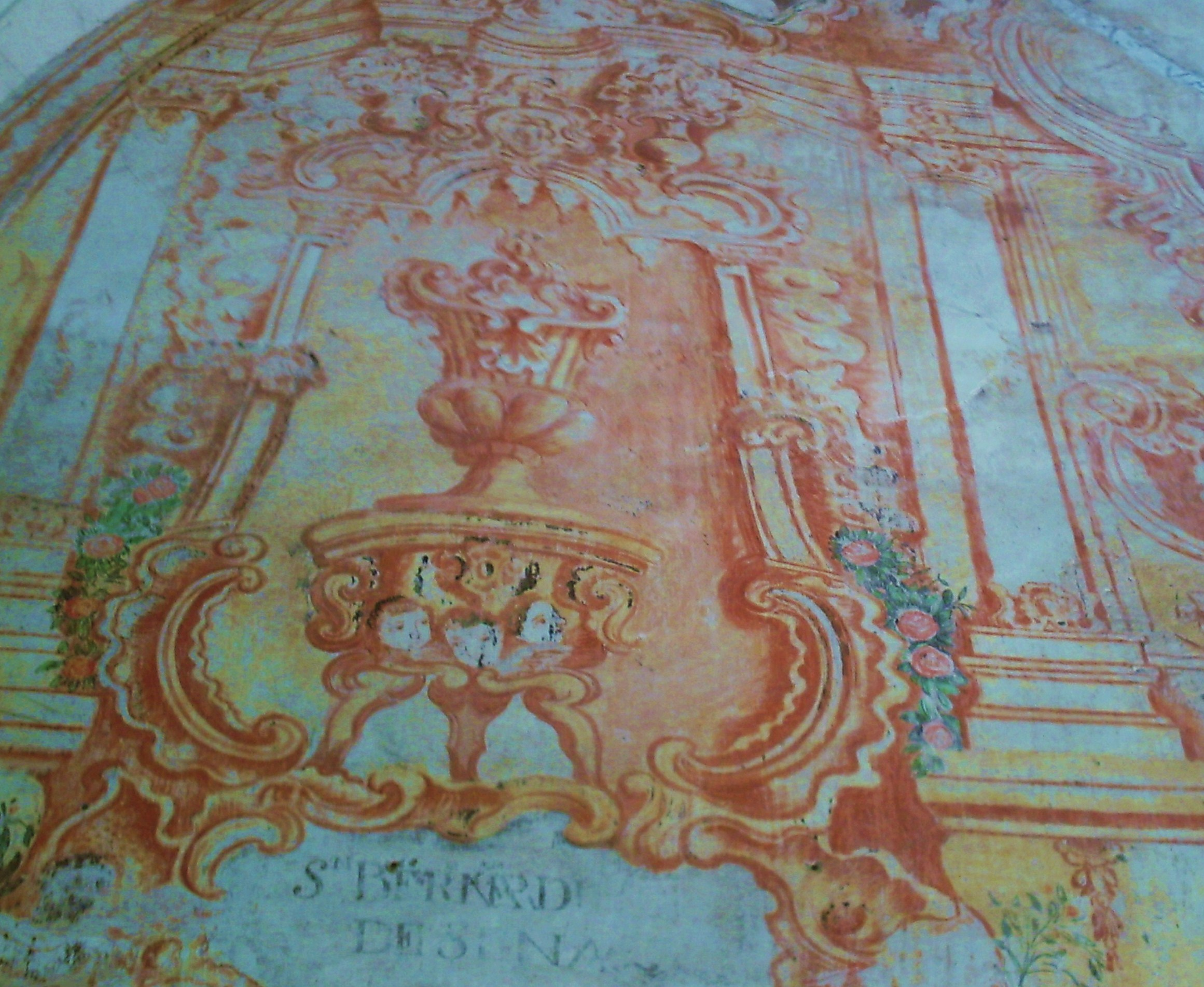
Ceiling painting at Monument House

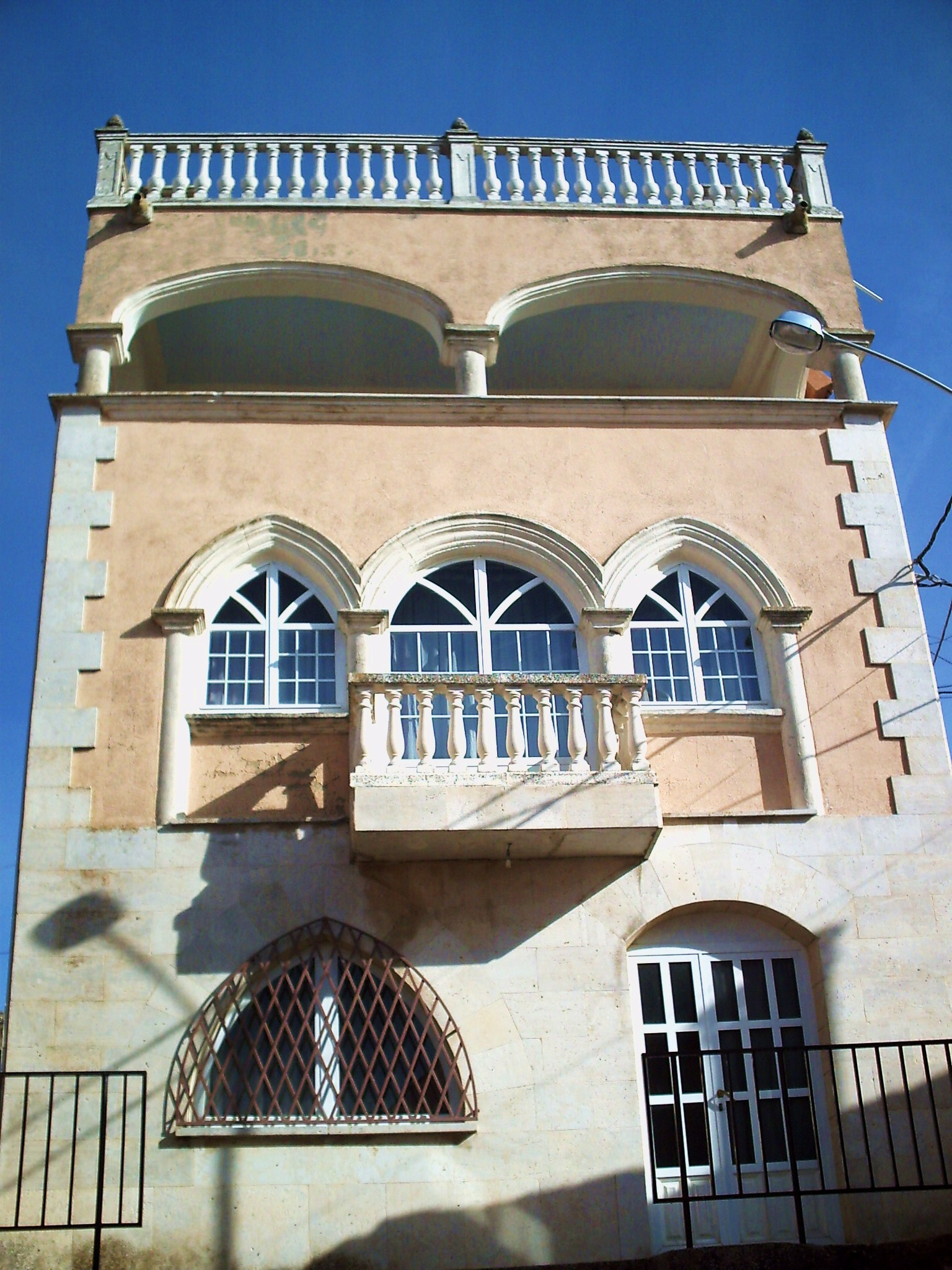
Traditional House

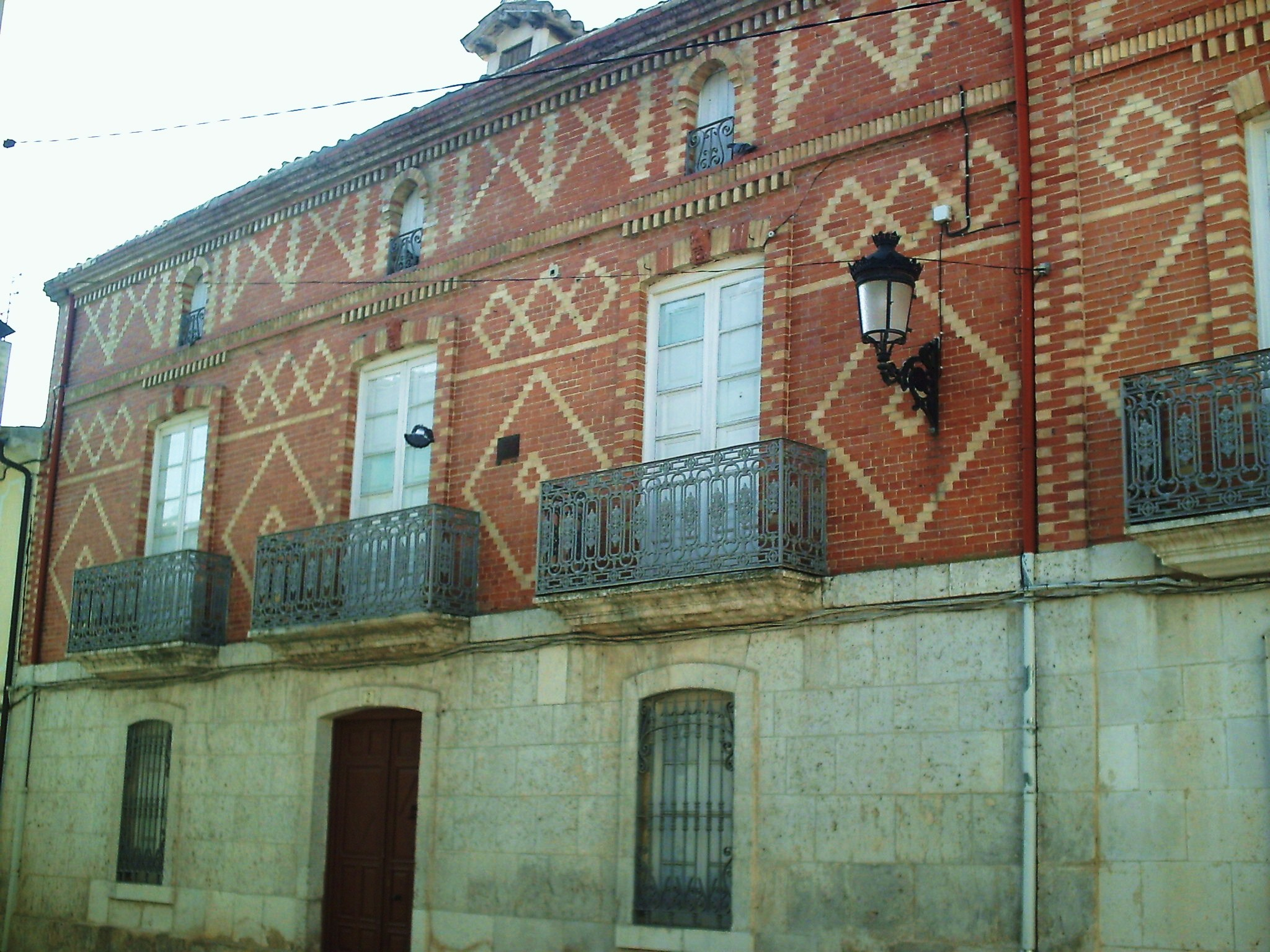
Monument House

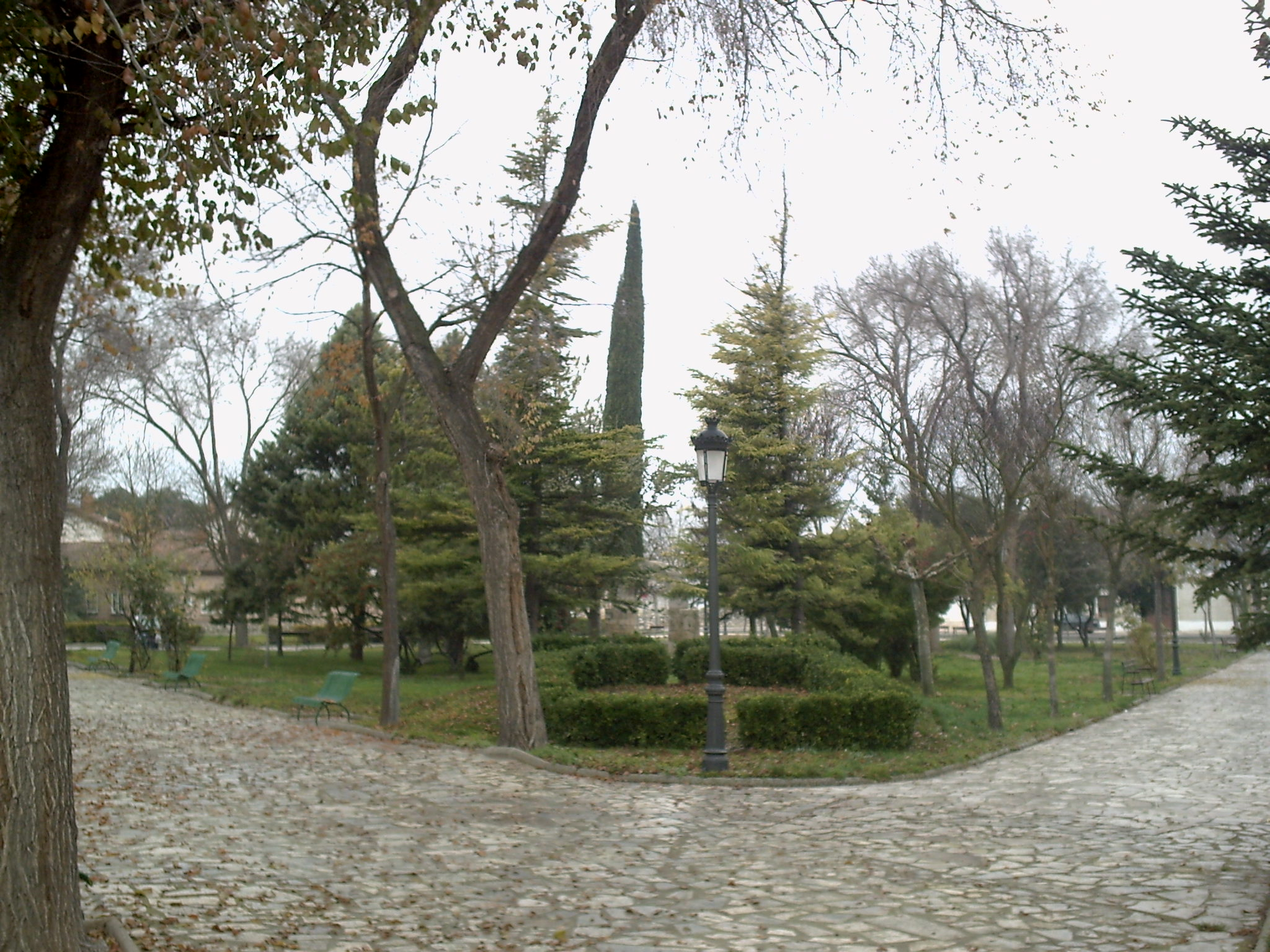
Winter at "La Carolina", Baltanás

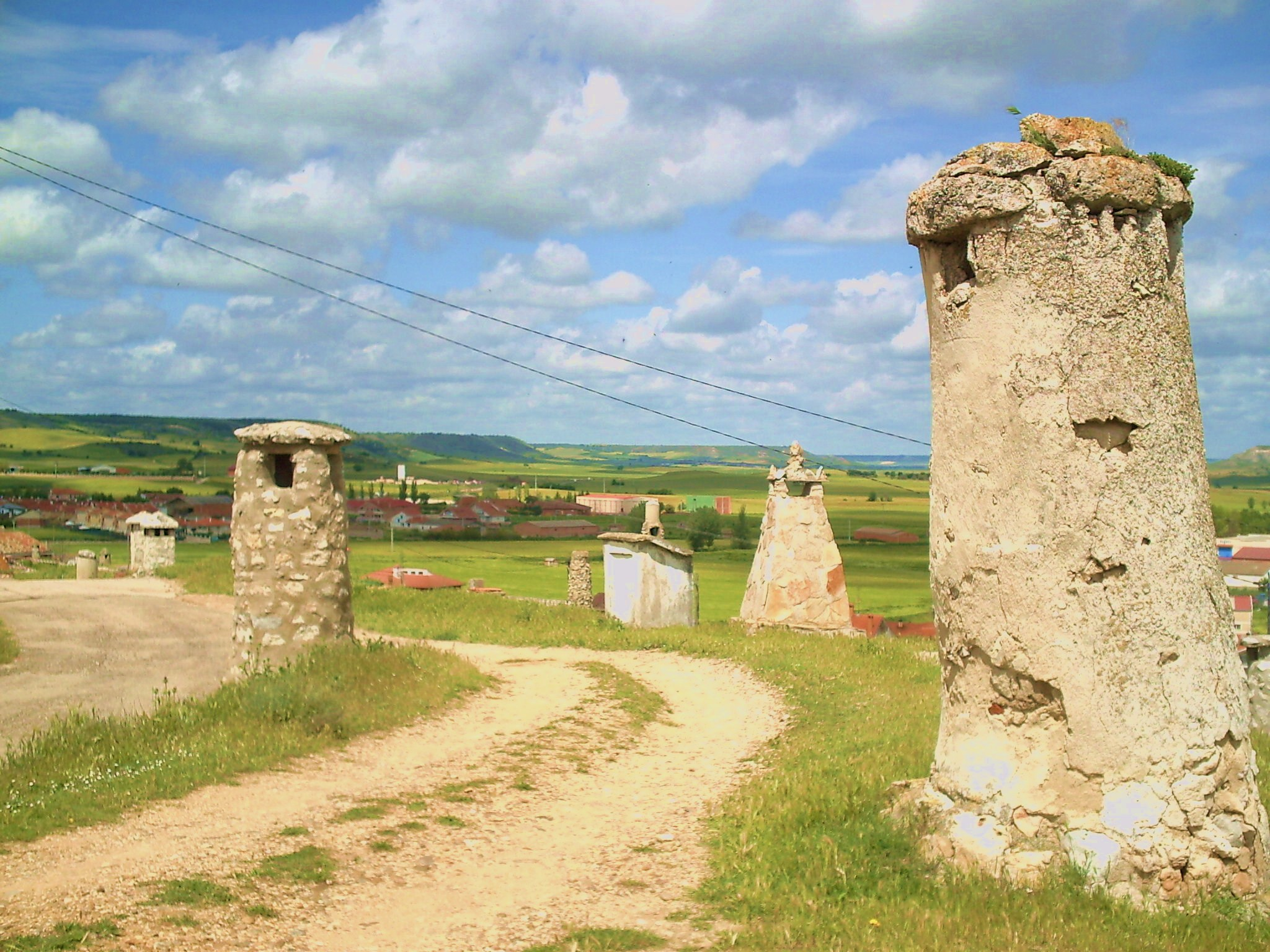

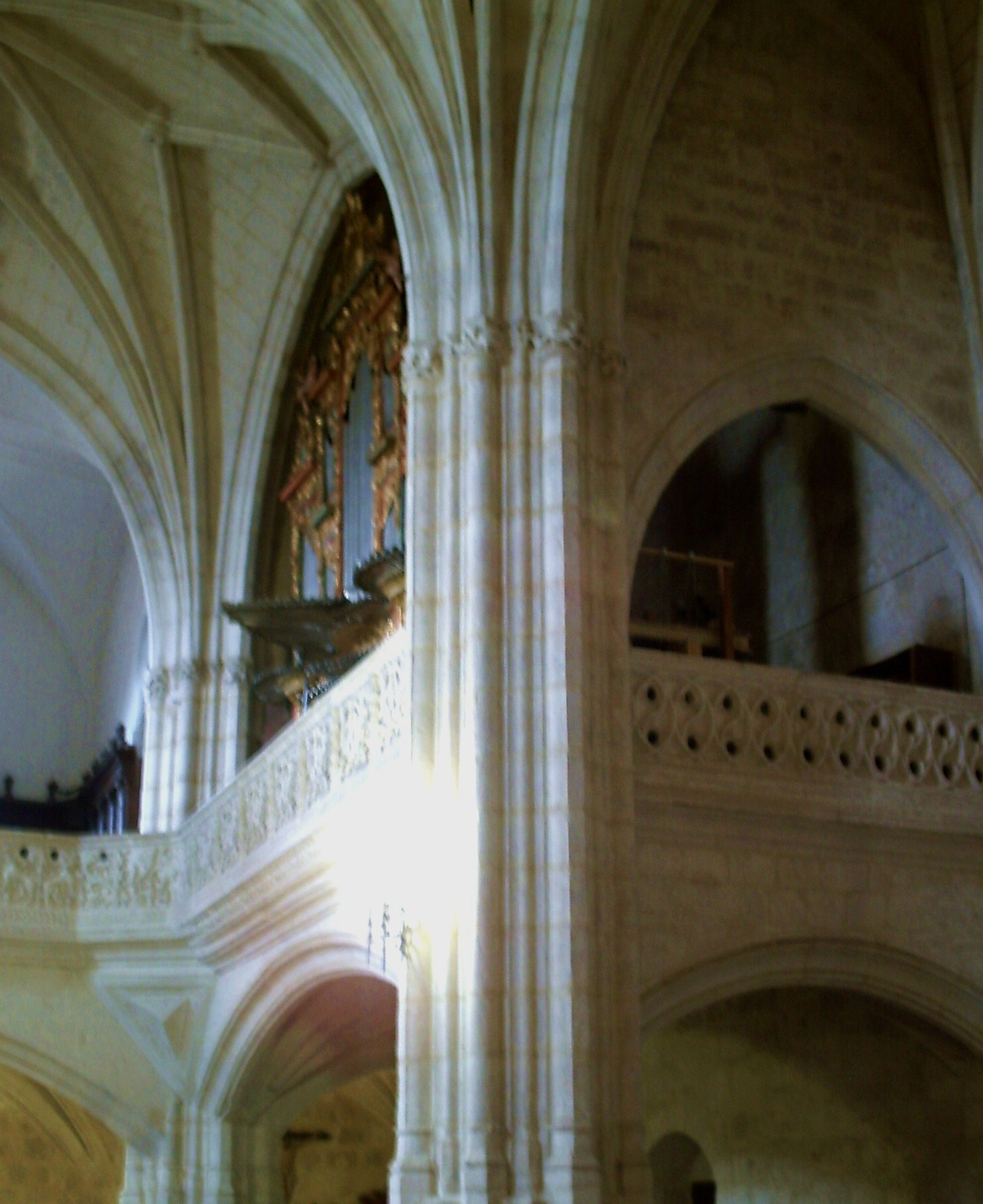
San Millán Church's organ

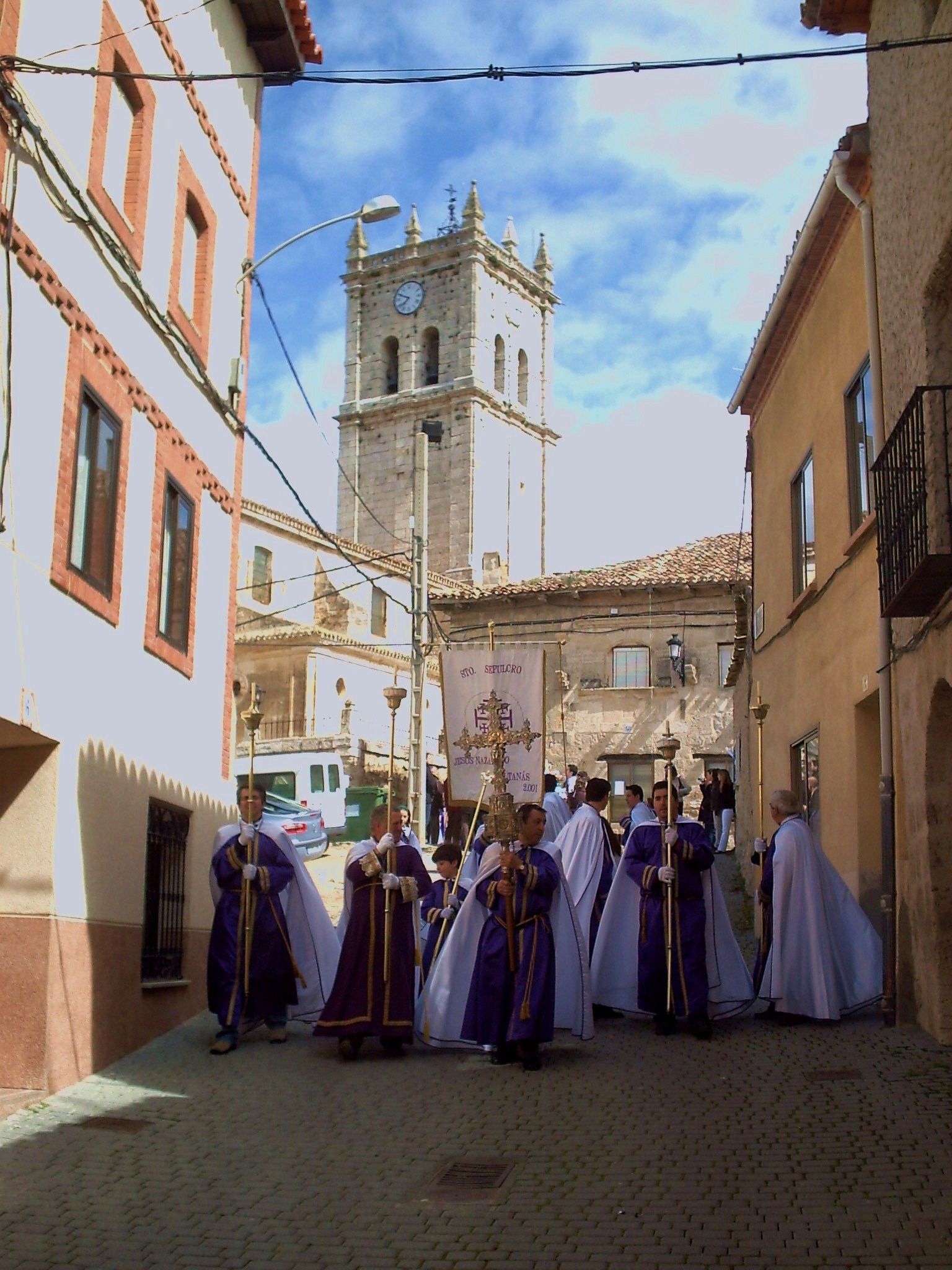
Holy Week celebrations
