= Golmayo =

- Municipality
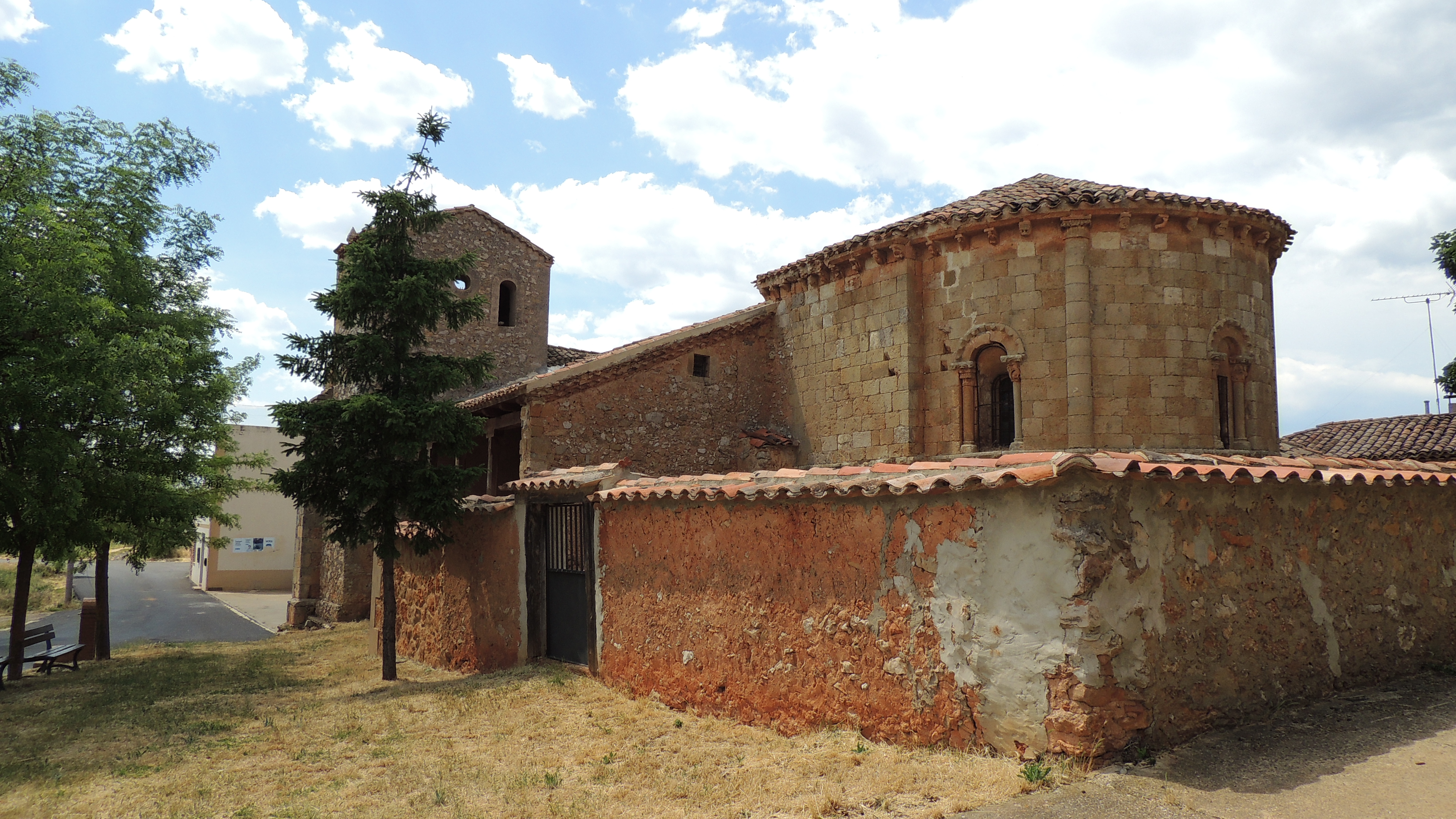

- Location within Castile and León Location within Spain
- Coordinates: 41°46′00″N 2°31′00″W
- Country: Spain
- Autonomous community: Castile and León
- Province: Province of Soria

Government
  - Mayor: Benito Serrano (PP)

Area
  - Total: 190 km^{2} (73 sq mi)
  - Land: 190 km^{2} (73 sq mi)
  - Water: 0.00 km^{2} (0 sq mi)

Population (2025-01-01)
  - Total: 3,085
  - Density: 16/km^{2} (42/sq mi)
- Time zone: UTC+1 (CET)
  - Summer (DST): UTC+2 (CEST)
- Website: Official website

Golmayo is a municipality in the Province of Soria, in the autonomous community of Castile and León, Spain. The municipality lies at an altitude of 1,025 metres (3,363 ft) and covers an area of 190 square kilometres (73 sq mi).

== Demography ==
The municipality's estimated population was 1,527 in 2006, 1,688 in 2007 and 1,815 in 2008, of which 961 were male and 854 female. The population density is 9.56.

Golmayo is now the province's 9th largest municipality by population. In 1996 it was the 19th. Due to its proximity to the provincial capital of Soria, of which it is becoming a suburb, Golmayo had the fastest growth rate of the province in the period from 1998 to 2008, when it gained 932 inhabitants, a growth of 209%. This is in contrast to the province of Soria as a whole, which has had a negative population trend during the last decades: 165 out of the 193 municipalities of the province have actually lost population since the mid-nineties and the overall result for the province of Soria has been a 1.9% increase in population in the twelve years to 2008.

== Local administration ==
The mayor of Golmayo is Mr. Félix Cubillo Romera of the Partido Popular. This party has four councillors in the town's ayuntamiento while the "Agrupación Municipal Independiente de Golmayo", has three and the Partido Socialista Obrero Español has two.

== Elections ==
In the 2008 Spanish General Election, the ruling Partido Socialista Obrero Español received 47.7% of the vote in Golmayo, the Partido Popular received 42.1%, and Izquierda Unida received 3.1%.
