= Femke Gerritse =

Dutch cyclist

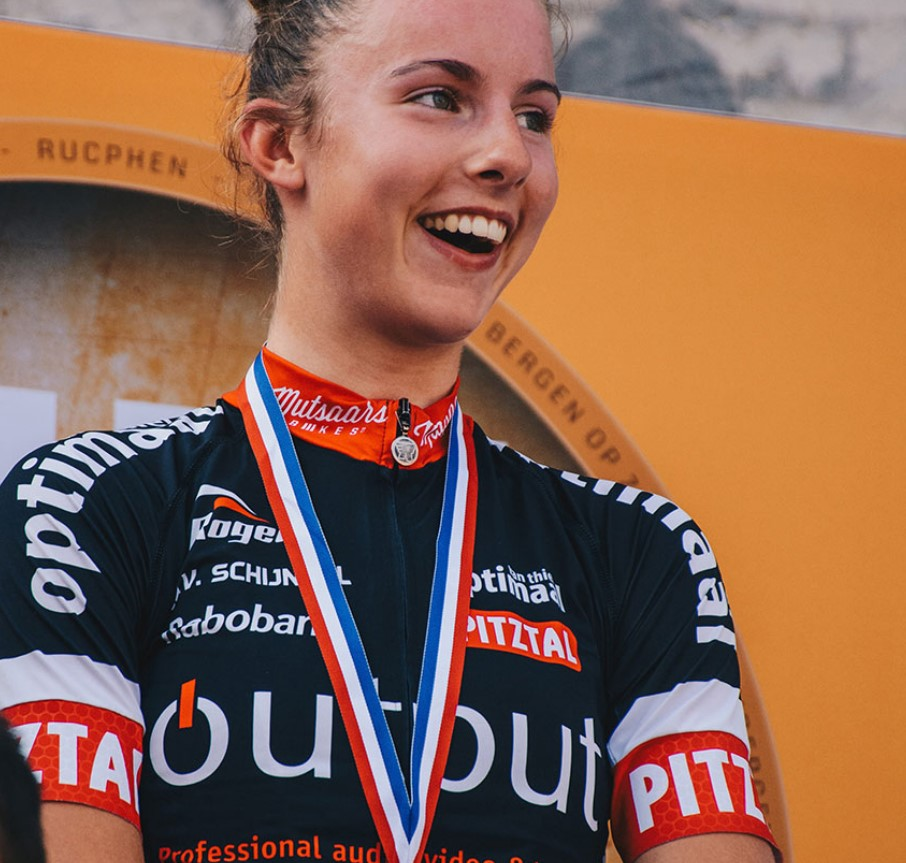

Personal information
- Full name: Femke Gerritse
- Born: May 14, 2001 (age 25) Rosmalen, Netherlands
- Height: 1.72 m (5 ft 8 in)
- Weight: 59 kg (130 lb)

Cycling career
- Sport: Cycling
- Current team: Team SD Worx–Protime
- Discipline: Road
- Role: Rider
- Rider type: Climber

Professional teams
- 2021–2023: Parkhotel Valkenburg
- 2024–: Team SD Worx–Protime

Major wins
- Major Tours La Vuelta Femenina 1 individual stage (2025)

Femke Gerritse (pronounced [ˈfɛmkə ˈɣɛrɪtsə]; born 14 May 2001) is a Dutch professional racing cyclist, who currently rides for UCI Women's WorldTeam Team SD Worx–Protime.

In 2019, she won the Dutch national junior women's road race. In 2021, she signed with Parkhotel Valkenburg. In 2022, she came third overall in the Thüringen Ladies Tour, winning the white jersey of best placed young rider. Later that year, Gerritse led the mountains classification at the Tour de France Femmes for four stages.

== Major results ==
2018
3rd Time trial, National Junior Road Championships
8th Watersley Ladies Challenge
2019
1st Road race, National Junior Road Championships
1st Stage 1 Watersley Ladies Challenge
2nd Overall EPZ Omloop van Borsele
3rd Overall Healthy Ageing Tour Junior

1st Stage 2

2021
4th Overall Watersley Women's Challenge

1st Stage 3

5th Road race, National Junior Road Championships
2022
3rd Overall Thüringen Ladies Tour

1st Young rider classification

3rd Team relay, UEC European Under-23 Road Championships
6th Trofeo Oro in Euro
8th Overall Watersley Women's Challenge
Tour de France

Held after Stages 3–6

2023
4th Overall Festival Elsy Jacobs
5th Kreiz Breizh Elites
7th Overall AG Tour de la Semois
8th Tre Valli Varesine
10th Grand Prix Stuttgart & Region
2024
4th Brabantse Pijl
4th Festival Elsy Jacobs Luxembourg
6th Festival Elsy Jacobs Garnich
2025
1st Omloop van het Hageland
