= India Grangier =

French cyclist

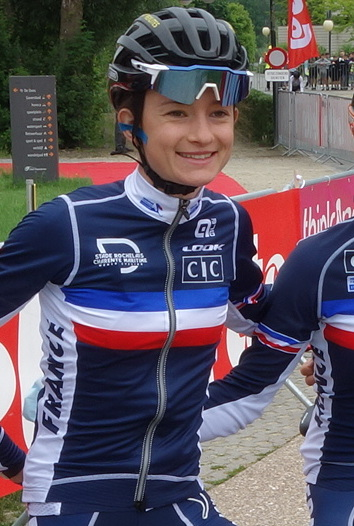
- India Grangier in 2021

Personal information
- Full name: India Grangier
- Born: 5 January 2000 (age 26) Redon, France
- Height: 1.68 m (5 ft 6 in)

Cycling career
- Sport: Cycling
- Current team: Hitec Products–Fluid Control
- Discipline: Road
- Role: Rider
- Rider type: Climber

Amateur teams
- 2017: VC Pays de Langon
- 2018: DN 17 Nouvelle Aquitaine

Professional teams
- 2019–2022: Charente-Maritime Women Cycling
- 2023–: Team Coop–Hitec Products

India Grangier (born 5 January 2000) is a French professional racing cyclist, who currently rides for UCI Women's Continental Team Hitec Products–Fluid Control. Grangier was previously a member of Charente-Maritime Women Cycling from 2018 to 2022.

== Major results ==
2018
9th GP Sofie Goos
2020
4th Road race, National Under-23 Road Championships
2021
1st Road race, National Under-23 Road Championships
9th Grand Prix du Morbihan Féminin
2024
1st Overall Volta a Portugal Feminina

1st Mountains classification
1st Stage 4

5th Ladies Tour of Estonia
